= 2016–17 Northern Football League =

The 2016–17 season was the 119th in the history of Northern Football League, a football competition in England. The league has operated two divisions in the English football league system, Division One at step 5, and Division Two at step 6.

== Division One ==
Northern Football League Division One
- Season: 2016–17
- Champions: South Shields
- Promoted: South Shields
- Relegated: Chester-le-Street Town; West Allotment Celtic
- Matches: 462
- Goals: 1,880 (4.07 per match)

Division One featured 19 clubs which competed in the division last season, along with three new clubs, promoted from Division Two:

- Chester-le-Street Town
- Ryhope Colliery Welfare
- South Shields

Two teams – Bishop Auckland and South Shields applied for promotion to step 4 for the 2017–18 season.

=== Division One table ===
Pos	Team	Pld	W	D	L	GF	GA	GD	Pts	Promotion or relegation
1	South Shields	42	34	6	2	127	35	+92	108	Promoted to the Northern Premier League
2	Morpeth Town	42	32	5	5	136	56	+80	101	
3	North Shields	42	32	5	5	107	39	+68	101	
4	Shildon	42	29	7	6	112	52	+60	94	
5	Marske United	42	22	6	14	103	75	+28	72	
6	Whitley Bay	42	19	13	10	88	70	+18	70	
7	Consett	42	19	8	15	105	81	+24	65	
8	Bishop Auckland	42	18	10	14	88	67	+21	64	
9	Newton Aycliffe	42	19	7	16	78	76	+2	64	
10	Newcastle Benfield	42	16	10	16	101	71	+30	58	
11	Sunderland RCA	42	16	9	17	85	79	+6	57	
12	Penrith	42	17	6	19	67	89	−22	57	
13	Jarrow Roofing BCA	42	14	12	16	83	90	−7	54	
14	Seaham Red Star	42	15	6	21	78	81	−3	51	
15	Dunston UTS	42	14	6	22	77	96	−19	48	
16	Ashington	42	13	8	21	73	90	−17	47	
17	Ryhope Colliery Welfare	42	11	10	21	82	129	−47	43	
18	West Auckland Town	42	11	3	28	60	120	−60	36	
19	Washington	42	10	5	27	67	111	−44	35	
20	Guisborough Town	42	10	7	25	70	124	−54	34 (Note: On 2 October Guisborough Town have been deducted 3 points for fielding an ineligible player.)	
21	Chester-le-Street Town	42	6	5	31	51	127	−76	23	Relegated to Division Two
22	West Allotment Celtic	42	6	4	32	42	122	−80	22	Relegated to Division Two

Source: fchd
Rules for classification: 1) Points; 2) Goal difference; 3) Number of goals scored; 4) Number of matches won; 5) Head-to-head results

== Division Two ==
Northern Football League Division Two
- Season: 2016–17
- Champions: Stockton Town
- Promoted: Billingham Synthonia; Stockton Town; Team Northumbria
- Matches: 420
- Goals: 1,554 (3.7 per match)

Division Two featured 17 clubs which competed in the division last season, along with five new clubs:

- Bedlington Terriers, relegated from Division One
- Blyth Town, promoted from the Northern Football Alliance
- Durham City, relegated from Division One
- Norton & Stockton Ancients, relegated from Division One
- Stockton Town, promoted from the Wearside League

=== Division Two table ===
Pos	Team	Pld	W	D	L	GF	GA	GD	Pts	Promotion
1	Stockton Town	40	28	9	3	111	37	+74	93	Promoted to Division One
2	Team Northumbria	40	28	5	7	98	37	+61	89	Promoted to Division One
3	Billingham Synthonia	40	26	8	6	89	37	+52	86	Promoted to Division One
4	Heaton Stannington	40	25	4	11	87	44	+43	79	
5	Billingham Town	40	23	9	8	109	42	+67	78	
6	Whickham	40	20	9	11	83	51	+32	69	
7	Easington Colliery	40	20	9	11	84	61	+23	69	
8	Blyth Town	40	20	8	12	96	56	+40	68	
9	Northallerton Town	40	17	11	12	90	68	+22	62	
10	Durham City	40	18	7	15	73	63	+10	61	
11	Hebburn Town	40	18	7	15	57	59	−2	61	
12	Bedlington Terriers	40	16	6	18	76	90	−14	54	
13	Tow Law Town	40	15	8	17	68	66	+2	53	
14	Brandon United	40	9	10	21	46	89	−43	37	
15	Alnwick Town	40	10	6	24	72	113	−41	36	
16	Thornaby	40	9	7	24	55	102	−47	34	
17	Crook Town	40	10	4	26	60	115	−55	34	
18	Willington	40	9	5	26	40	94	−54	32	
19	Darlington Railway Athletic	40	9	4	27	61	126	−65	31	
20	Ryton & Crawcrook Albion	40	7	9	24	46	93	−47	30	
21	Esh Winning	40	7	7	26	53	111	−58	28	
22	Norton & Stockton Ancients (Note: Norton & Stockton Ancients withdrew from the league on 9 December, club record W=9 D=1 L=8 GF=38 GA=33 expunged.)	0	0	0	0	0	0	0	0	Resigned from the league

Source: fchd
Rules for classification: 1) Points; 2) Goal difference; 3) Number of goals scored; 4) Number of matches won; 5) Head-to-head results
