= 2026–27 Northern Premier League =

The 2026–27 season is the 59th season of the Northern Premier League. The league consists of four divisions, the Premier Division at Step 3 of the National League System, and the West, East and Midlands divisions at Step 4.

== Premier Division ==
Northern Premier League Premier Division
- Season: 2026-27

The Premier Division consists of 22 teams, 15 from the previous season and seven new teams.

=== Team changes ===
To the Premier Division

Promoted from Division One East

- Emley
- Redcar Athletic

Promoted from Division One West

- Avro
- Bury

Relegated from the National League North

- Alfreton Town
- Curzon Ashton

Transferred from the Southern League Premier Division Central

- Quorn

From the Premier Division

Promoted to the National League North

- Hebburn Town
- Hednesford Town

Transferred to the Southern League Premier Division Central

- Rushall Olympic

Relegated to Division One East

- Stocksbridge Park Steels
- Morpeth Town

Relegated to Division One West

- Prescot Cables

Club folded

- Widnes

=== Premier Division table ===
| Pos | Team | Pld | W | D | L | GF | GA | GD | Pts | Promotion, qualification or relegation |
|---|---|---|---|---|---|---|---|---|---|---|
| 1 | Redcar Athletic | 20 | 12 | 6 | 2 | 45 | 21 | +24 | 42 | Promotion to the National League North |
| 2 | Cleethorpes Town | 20 | 13 | 3 | 4 | 39 | 15 | +24 | 42 | Qualification for the play-off semi-finals (Note: Six teams play for one spot and promotion to the National League North) |
| 3 | Curzon Ashton | 19 | 13 | 1 | 5 | 35 | 18 | +17 | 40 | Qualification for the play-off semi-finals |
| 4 | Warrington Rylands 1906 | 20 | 11 | 4 | 5 | 42 | 29 | +13 | 37 | Qualification for the play-off quarter-finals |
| 5 | Guiseley | 17 | 11 | 3 | 3 | 38 | 17 | +21 | 36 | Qualification for the play-off quarter-finals |
| 6 | Avro | 19 | 11 | 2 | 6 | 46 | 34 | +12 | 35 | Qualification for the play-off quarter-finals |
| 7 | Gainsborough Trinity | 19 | 10 | 2 | 7 | 36 | 28 | +8 | 32 | Qualification for the play-off quarter-finals |
| 8 | Bury | 18 | 9 | 3 | 6 | 38 | 25 | +13 | 30 | |
| 9 | Workington | 19 | 9 | 3 | 7 | 32 | 29 | +3 | 30 | |
| 10 | Warrington Town | 18 | 8 | 5 | 5 | 31 | 26 | +5 | 29 | |
| 11 | Stockton Town | 20 | 7 | 3 | 10 | 31 | 33 | −2 | 24 | |
| 12 | Quorn | 19 | 6 | 6 | 7 | 38 | 43 | −5 | 24 | |
| 13 | Lancaster City | 20 | 7 | 3 | 10 | 24 | 35 | −11 | 24 | |
| 14 | Alfreton Town | 19 | 7 | 2 | 10 | 23 | 28 | −5 | 23 | |
| 15 | Emley | 19 | 6 | 5 | 8 | 21 | 31 | −10 | 23 | |
| 16 | Hyde United | 19 | 6 | 3 | 10 | 22 | 35 | −13 | 21 | |
| 17 | Ashton United | 19 | 5 | 5 | 9 | 23 | 26 | −3 | 20 | |
| 18 | Whitby Town | 20 | 6 | 2 | 12 | 26 | 53 | −27 | 20 | |
| 19 | Leek Town | 18 | 4 | 6 | 8 | 35 | 40 | −5 | 18 | Relegation to Step 4 |
| 20 | FC United of Manchester | 19 | 3 | 7 | 9 | 27 | 33 | −6 | 16 | Relegation to Step 4 |
| 21 | Ilkeston Town | 20 | 4 | 1 | 15 | 14 | 42 | −28 | 13 | Relegation to Step 4 |
| 22 | Bamber Bridge | 19 | 2 | 5 | 12 | 18 | 43 | −25 | 11 | Relegation to Step 4 |

Updated to match(es) played on 21 November 2026. Source: NPL official site
Rules for classification: 1) points; 2) goal difference; 3) number of goals scored; 4) number of matches won; 5) head-to-head results

=== Results table ===
| Home \ Away | ALF | ASH | AVR | BAM | BRY | CLE | CUR | EML | UOM | GAI | GUI | HYD | ILK | LNC | LEE | QRN | RED | STN | WRY | WRT | WHI | WRK |
|---|---|---|---|---|---|---|---|---|---|---|---|---|---|---|---|---|---|---|---|---|---|---|
| Alfreton Town | — | | 3–0 | | 2–3 | | 0–3 | 2–1 | 1–0 | 2–1 | 1–0 | 4–0 | | | | | | | 1–2 | 1–1 | | |
| Ashton United | 0–0 | — | | | | 0–1 | | | | 1–2 | | | 1–1 | 4–1 | | | 1–2 | | 1–2 | 0–1 | 2–0 | |
| Avro | | 3–2 | — | | | | | | | | 0–1 | | | 5–3 | 4–4 | 2–1 | | 5–3 | | 0–3 | 3–1 | 4–1 |
| Bamber Bridge | 1–0 | 1–0 | 1–6 | — | 0–1 | 0–1 | | | 1–1 | | | 4–4 | | | | 2–4 | | | | 0–1 | | 1–2 |
| Bury | | | 2–2 | | — | 1–0 | 3–2 | 4–0 | | | | | 7–0 | 0–1 | 5–3 | | 2–2 | | 1–0 | | | 1–2 |
| Cleethorpes Town | 2–1 | | 1–0 | 2–0 | | — | 1–3 | | 3–2 | | | 1–0 | | | | | 1–1 | 1–3 | 3–0 | | 6–0 | |
| Curzon Ashton | 1–0 | 2–0 | | 2–2 | | | — | | 1–0 | | 1–2 | 2–0 | 1–0 | | 2–1 | | 3–1 | | | | | |
| Emley | | 1–1 | | 2–0 | | | 2–1 | — | | 1–2 | 0–4 | 0–2 | 1–2 | 1–0 | | | | | | | 2–1 | 1–3 |
| FC United of Manchester | | | 3–4 | | | | | 1–1 | — | 0–3 | | | | 0–0 | 1–1 | 1–1 | | | 3–3 | 4–1 | 4–2 | 1–2 |
| Gainsborough Trinity | | | 0–2 | 1–1 | 0–1 | 0–3 | 0–3 | | | — | | 4–0 | 3–1 | 1–3 | | | | 4–1 | | | | 2–0 |
| Guiseley | | 4–1 | | | 3–2 | 2–1 | | | | | — | | | 1–2 | 4–1 | 4–1 | | 3–0 | | 1–2 | | |
| Hyde United | | | 0–1 | | 2–1 | | | 0–0 | 1–0 | | | — | | | | 2–2 | 4–2 | 2–1 | 1–3 | | 1–3 | |
| Ilkeston Town | | | 2–0 | | | 0–3 | | | 0–2 | | 0–2 | 1–0 | — | | | 0–2 | 0–5 | 1–0 | 0–1 | 1–2 | | |
| Lancaster City | | 1–3 | | | | 0–2 | 0–2 | | | | | 1–2 | 2–1 | — | 1–2 | 2–2 | | 1–0 | 1–0 | | | 0–3 |
| Leek Town | | 2–2 | | 4–1 | | | | 1–2 | | | | 2–1 | 3–2 | | — | | | | 3–3 | 1–2 | 1–2 | |
| Quorn | 4–0 | 2–2 | 0–4 | | 5–4 | 0–5 | | | | 2–2 | | | | | | — | 1–1 | 2–3 | | 3–2 | 3–6 | 3–0 |
| Redcar Athletic | 3–1 | | 3–1 | 4–0 | 0–0 | | | 0–0 | 3–2 | | 2–2 | | | 3–1 | 3–2 | | — | | | 2–0 | | |
| Stockton Town | 2–0 | 0–1 | | 5–2 | 1–0 | | 0–1 | 1–3 | 2–2 | | | | 2–1 | | 1–1 | | 0–2 | — | | | | |
| Warrington Rylands 1906 | | | | 3–1 | | | 5–1 | 4–1 | 3–0 | 3–1 | 1–1 | | | | | 1–0 | 0–5 | 1–1 | — | | 5–1 | |
| Warrington Town | | | | | | 1–1 | 0–4 | 2–2 | | 1–2 | | 3–0 | | 2–2 | | | | | | — | | 2–2 |
| Whitby Town | 1–4 | | | 0–0 | | | 1–0 | | | 2–6 | 0–2 | | 2–0 | 1–2 | 1–1 | | | 0–5 | | 0–5 | — | |
| Workington | 3–0 | 0–1 | | | | 1–1 | | | | 1–2 | 2–2 | | 3–1 | | 3–2 | | 0–1 | | 3–2 | | 1–2 | — |

Updated to match(es) played on 21 November 2026. Source: NPL official site
Legend: Blue = home team win; Yellow = draw; Red = away team win.

=== Top goalscorers ===
Updated 21 November 2026

| Rank | Player | Club | Goals |
|---|---|---|---|
| 1 | (England) Adam Boyes | Redcar Athletic | 15 |
| 2 | (England) Harrison Wood | Warrington Rylands 1906 | 14 |
| 3 | (England) Harry Salt | Avro | 13 |
| 4 | (England) Josh Walker | Cleethorpes Town | 13 |
| 5 | (England) Luke Hunter | Workington | 11 |
| 6 | (England) Callum Hickman | Whitby Town | 10 |
| 6 | (Italy) Benito Lowe | Avro | 10 |
| 8 | (England) Jesse Friend | Quorn | 9 |
| 8 | (England) Jack Griffiths | Leek Town | 9 |
| 8 | (England) Cameron Wilson | Guiseley | 9 |

=== Stadia and locations ===
2026–27 Premier Division teams
Locations of Northern Premier League 2026–27 Premier Division teams (Greater Manchester)

| Club | Location | Ground | Capacity |
|---|---|---|---|
| Alfreton Town | Alfreton | North Street | 3,600 |
| Ashton United | Ashton-under-Lyne | Hurst Cross | 4,500 |
| Avro | Oldham | Whitebank Stadium | 1,500 |
| Bamber Bridge | Bamber Bridge | Irongate | 2,642 |
| Bury | Bury | Gigg Lane | 12,500 |
| Cleethorpes Town | Grimsby | Clee Road | 1,000 |
| Curzon Ashton | Ashton-under-Lyne | Tameside Stadium | 4,000 |
| Emley | Emley | Fantastic Media Welfare Ground | 2,000 |
| FC United of Manchester | Manchester (Moston) | Broadhurst Park | 4,400 |
| Gainsborough Trinity | Gainsborough | The Northolme | 4,304 |
| Guiseley | Guiseley | Nethermoor Park | 4,000 |
| Hyde United | Hyde | Ewen Fields | 4,250 |
| Ilkeston Town | Ilkeston | New Manor Ground | 3,029 |
| Lancaster City | Lancaster | The Giant Axe | 3,500 |
| Leek Town | Leek | Harrison Park | 3,600 |
| Quorn | Quorn | Farley Way Stadium | 1,477 |
| Redcar Athletic | Redcar | Green Lane | 1,000 |
| Stockton Town | Stockton | Bishopton Road West | 2,200 |
| Warrington Rylands 1906 | Warrington | Gorsey Lane | 1,345 |
| Warrington Town | Warrington | Cantilever Park | 2,500 |
| Whitby Town | Whitby | Turnbull Ground | 3,500 |
| Workington | Workington | Borough Park | 3,101 |

== Division One East ==
Northern Premier League Division One East
- Season: 2026–27

Division One East consists of 22 teams, 16 from the previous season and 6 new teams.

=== Team changes ===
To Division One East

Promoted from the Northern Counties East League Premier Division

- Beverley Town
- Liversedge

Promoted from the Northern League Division One

- Guisborough Town
- West Auckland Town

Relegated from the Premier Division

- Morpeth Town
- Stocksbridge Park Steels

From Division One East

Promoted to the Premier Division

- Emley
- Redcar Athletic

Relegated to the Northern League Division One

- Bishop Auckland
- Blyth Town
- Newton Aycliffe

Voluntary Demotion to Step 7

- Brighouse Town

=== Division One East table ===
| Pos | Team | Pld | W | D | L | GF | GA | GD | Pts | Promotion, qualification or relegation |
|---|---|---|---|---|---|---|---|---|---|---|
| 1 | Bradford (Park Avenue) | 20 | 15 | 5 | 0 | 52 | 16 | +36 | 50 | Promotion to the Premier Division |
| 2 | Dunston | 19 | 15 | 3 | 1 | 39 | 12 | +27 | 48 | Qualification for the play-off semi-finals |
| 3 | Liversedge | 21 | 11 | 3 | 7 | 36 | 28 | +8 | 36 | Qualification for the play-off semi-finals |
| 4 | Blyth Spartans | 19 | 11 | 2 | 6 | 30 | 24 | +6 | 35 | Qualification for the play-off quarter-finals |
| 5 | Morpeth Town | 21 | 9 | 7 | 5 | 24 | 16 | +8 | 34 | Qualification for the play-off quarter-finals |
| 6 | Lincoln United | 21 | 10 | 4 | 7 | 37 | 33 | +4 | 34 | Qualification for the play-off quarter-finals |
| 7 | Matlock Town | 19 | 10 | 3 | 6 | 41 | 27 | +14 | 33 | Qualification for the play-off quarter-finals |
| 8 | Pontefract Collieries | 20 | 9 | 6 | 5 | 37 | 24 | +13 | 33 | |
| 9 | Silsden | 20 | 9 | 4 | 7 | 30 | 28 | +2 | 31 | |
| 10 | Garforth Town | 20 | 8 | 6 | 6 | 36 | 27 | +9 | 30 | |
| 11 | West Auckland Town | 21 | 8 | 4 | 9 | 30 | 30 | 0 | 28 | |
| 12 | Consett | 19 | 8 | 3 | 8 | 38 | 29 | +9 | 27 | |
| 13 | Heaton Stannington | 19 | 7 | 4 | 8 | 23 | 27 | −4 | 25 | |
| 14 | Ossett United | 20 | 6 | 6 | 8 | 27 | 26 | +1 | 24 | |
| 15 | North Ferriby | 20 | 6 | 5 | 9 | 25 | 34 | −9 | 23 | |
| 16 | Bridlington Town | 17 | 6 | 4 | 7 | 24 | 26 | −2 | 22 | |
| 17 | Guisborough Town | 18 | 6 | 4 | 8 | 23 | 29 | −6 | 22 | |
| 18 | Ashington | 19 | 4 | 5 | 10 | 27 | 34 | −7 | 17 | |
| 19 | Beverley Town | 19 | 5 | 2 | 12 | 14 | 30 | −16 | 17 | Relegation to Step 5 |
| 20 | Grimsby Borough | 20 | 5 | 2 | 13 | 25 | 43 | −18 | 17 | Relegation to Step 5 |
| 21 | Hallam | 19 | 2 | 3 | 14 | 9 | 42 | −33 | 9 | Relegation to Step 5 |
| 22 | Stocksbridge Park Steels | 19 | 1 | 3 | 15 | 11 | 53 | −42 | 6 | Relegation to Step 5 |

Updated to match(es) played on 21 November 2026. Source: NPL official site
Rules for classification: 1) points; 2) goal difference; 3) number of goals scored; 4) number of matches won; 5) head-to-head results

=== Results table ===
| Home \ Away | ASH | BEV | BLY | BPA | BRI | CON | DUN | GAR | GRI | GUI | HAL | HEA | LIN | LIV | MAT | MOR | NOR | OSS | PON | SIL | SPS | WAT |
|---|---|---|---|---|---|---|---|---|---|---|---|---|---|---|---|---|---|---|---|---|---|---|
| Ashington | — | 3–1 | | | 1–3 | 1–2 | 1–1 | 2–1 | | | | | | | | 1–1 | | 3–1 | 1–2 | 1–2 | | |
| Beverley Town | | — | | | | | 1–3 | 0–1 | 0–2 | | | 0–1 | 0–2 | 0–1 | | 1–0 | | 2–1 | 1–1 | | 2–0 | |
| Blyth Spartans | | 5–1 | — | | | | 1–1 | 1–0 | | | | 2–1 | 1–0 | | 3–2 | 1–0 | 1–0 | 3–0 | | | 3–1 | |
| Bradford (Park Avenue) | 4–1 | 2–2 | 4–0 | — | | | | 1–1 | 7–1 | | 4–1 | | 3–1 | 2–1 | | | 3–2 | | | 2–0 | | |
| Bridlington Town | | | 1–1 | 0–1 | — | | | 0–2 | | | 1–1 | | | 1–3 | | 1–1 | 3–1 | | | | | 3–0 |
| Consett | | 2–0 | 6–2 | 1–1 | | — | | | | | 4–0 | | 1–2 | 3–1 | 4–6 | | 3–2 | | | 1–1 | 4–0 | |
| Dunston | | | 2–1 | | | 1–0 | — | 1–3 | 4–0 | 1–0 | 1–0 | | 3–2 | | | | | | 2–0 | 3–1 | | 4–0 |
| Garforth Town | | 1–2 | | | | 2–2 | | — | | | | | 2–2 | | 2–2 | 2–0 | 2–0 | 2–3 | 1–1 | | 4–1 | 1–0 |
| Grimsby Borough | 3–0 | | 0–2 | | 1–2 | 1–2 | | 3–3 | — | 0–0 | 3–0 | | | 0–3 | 2–5 | | | | | 0–2 | | |
| Guisborough Town | 1–0 | | 0–1 | 1–3 | | 2–0 | | 2–0 | | — | 2–0 | 2–1 | 2–2 | | | 1–2 | | | | | 4–0 | |
| Hallam | 2–1 | | | | | | | 0–3 | | | — | | 0–2 | 1–3 | 1–1 | | | | 0–3 | 0–2 | | |
| Heaton Stannington | 2–1 | | | 1–6 | | | 0–1 | | 2–0 | 1–1 | 1–2 | — | | 2–1 | | | | 1–0 | | | 2–0 | |
| Lincoln United | 1–4 | | | | 3–0 | | | | 0–2 | | 3–0 | 2–1 | — | | | 1–1 | 2–1 | 3–1 | 1–1 | | | 3–2 |
| Liversedge | 1–1 | | 1–0 | | 1–0 | | 0–0 | 4–3 | | 4–1 | | | 5–2 | — | | 0–1 | 1–2 | | | 3–0 | 3–2 | |
| Matlock Town | | 2–0 | | 0–1 | 2–4 | | 0–2 | | 3–2 | | | 3–0 | | 2–0 | — | | | | 3–1 | 2–2 | | 0–2 |
| Morpeth Town | 1–1 | | | 0–2 | | 2–1 | | | 3–1 | | 2–0 | 0–0 | | | 0–2 | — | 2–0 | | | | 4–0 | 2–0 |
| North Ferriby | | 1–0 | | | | | 0–2 | | | 3–2 | 1–0 | 2–2 | | | 0–3 | | — | | 3–2 | 2–1 | 2–2 | 2–2 |
| Ossett United | | | | 1–1 | 3–1 | 1–0 | 1–3 | | | 2–2 | 0–0 | | | | 1–0 | 0–0 | 1–1 | — | | | | 2–0 |
| Pontefract Collieries | | | 2–1 | | 1–1 | 2–1 | | | 3–1 | 5–0 | | 1–4 | | 5–0 | | 0–0 | 0–0 | 2–0 | — | | | |
| Silsden | | 0–1 | 2–1 | 1–3 | 4–2 | | | | | 4–0 | | 0–0 | 3–1 | | | | | 2–1 | 3–2 | — | 0–0 | |
| Stocksbridge Park Steels | 2–2 | | | 1–2 | 0–1 | | 1–4 | | 1–0 | | | | 0–2 | | 0–3 | | | 0–8 | | | — | 0–3 |
| West Auckland Town | 3–2 | 2–0 | | 0–0 | | 2–1 | | | 1–3 | | 5–1 | 3–1 | | 0–0 | | 1–2 | | 0–0 | 1–3 | 3–0 | | — |

Updated to match(es) played on 21 November 2026. Source: NPL official site
Legend: Blue = home team win; Yellow = draw; Red = away team win.

=== Top goalscorers ===
Updated 21 November 2026

| Rank | Player | Club | Goals |
|---|---|---|---|
| 1 | (England) Liam Moran | Lincoln United | 13 |
| 2 | (England) Robbie Fox | Bradford Park Avenue | 12 |
| 3 | (Netherlands) Jed Abbey | Matlock Town | 11 |
| 4 | (England) Dan Lanning | Blyth Spartans | 10 |
| 5 | (England) Nic Bollado | Dunston | 9 |
| 5 | (England) Marcus Carver | Bradford Park Avenue | 9 |
| 5 | (Northern Ireland) Conor Washington | Matlock Town | 9 |
| 8 | (England) Mutty Al-Jahadhmy | Garforth Town | 8 |
| 8 | (England) Donny Holdsworth | Consett | 8 |
| 8 | (England) Fin o'Gorman | West Auckland Town | 8 |
| 8 | (England) Isaac Walker | Consett | 8 |

=== Stadia and locations ===
Locations of Northern Premier League 2026–27 Division One East teams
Locations of Northern Premier League 2025–26 Premier Division teams (West Yorkshire)

| Team | Location | Stadium | Capacity |
|---|---|---|---|
| Ashington | Ashington | Woodhorn Lane | 2,000 |
| Beverley Town | Beverley | Norwood Recreation Ground | 1,500 |
| Blyth Spartans | Blyth | Croft Park | 4,435 |
| Bradford (Park Avenue) | Bradford | Horsfall Stadium | 3,500 |
| Bridlington Town | Bridlington | Queensgate | 3,000 |
| Consett | Consett | Belle View Stadium | 3,770 |
| Dunston | Dunston | Wellington Road | 2,500 |
| Garforth Town | Garforth | Wheatley Park | 3,000 |
| Grimsby Borough | Grimsby | Bradley Football Centre | 1,250 |
| Guisborough Town | Guisborough | King George V Ground | 3,500 |
| Hallam | Crosspool | Sandygate | 1,665 |
| Heaton Stannington | High Heaton | The Willow Park | 2,000 |
| Lincoln United | Lincoln | Ashby Avenue | 2,714 |
| Liversedge | Liversedge | Clayborn | 2,000 |
| Matlock Town | Matlock | Causeway Lane | 2,400 |
| Morpeth Town | Morpeth | Craik Park | 1,500 |
| North Ferriby | North Ferriby | The Dransfield Stadium | 3,000 |
| Ossett United | Ossett | Ingfield | 3,280 |
| Pontefract Collieries | Pontefract | Harratt Nissan Stadium | 1,200 |
| Silsden | Silsden | Keighley Road Stadium | 1,500 |
| Stocksbridge Park Steels | Stocksbridge | Bracken Moor | 3,500 |
| West Auckland Town | West Auckland | Darlington Road | 2,000 |

== Division One Midlands ==
Northern Premier League Division One Midlands
- Season: 2026–27

Division One Midlands consists of 22 teams, 16 from the previous season and 6 new teams.

=== Team changes ===
To Division One Midlands

Promoted from the United Counties League Premier Division North

- Boston Town
- Grantham Town

Promoted from the United Counties League Premier Division South

- Coventry United
- Nuneaton Town

Relegated from the Southern League Premier Division Central

- Barwell
- St Ives Town

From Division One Midlands

Promoted to the Southern League Premier Division Central

- Anstey Nomads
- Racing Club Warwick

Transferred to Division One West

- Lichfield City

Relegated to the United Counties League Premier Division South

- Coventry Sphinx
- Rugby Town
- St Neots Town

=== Division One Midlands table ===
| Pos | Team | Pld | W | D | L | GF | GA | GD | Pts | Promotion, qualification or relegation |
|---|---|---|---|---|---|---|---|---|---|---|
| 1 | Wellingborough Town | 19 | 17 | 2 | 0 | 53 | 20 | +33 | 53 | Promotion to the Southern League Premier Division Central |
| 2 | Sutton Coldfield Town | 19 | 12 | 3 | 4 | 41 | 27 | +14 | 39 | Qualification for the play-off semi-finals |
| 3 | Loughborough Students | 20 | 11 | 3 | 6 | 45 | 28 | +17 | 36 | Qualification for the play-off semi-finals |
| 4 | Mickleover | 19 | 10 | 4 | 5 | 30 | 24 | +6 | 34 | Qualification for the play-off quarter-finals |
| 5 | Carlton Town | 20 | 9 | 5 | 6 | 31 | 31 | 0 | 32 | Qualification for the play-off quarter-finals |
| 6 | Shepshed Dynamo | 20 | 8 | 7 | 5 | 41 | 25 | +16 | 31 | Qualification for the play-off quarter-finals |
| 7 | Nuneaton Town | 19 | 10 | 1 | 8 | 31 | 22 | +9 | 31 | Qualification for the play-off quarter-finals |
| 8 | Belper Town | 19 | 8 | 6 | 5 | 25 | 18 | +7 | 30 | |
| 9 | Boldmere St Michaels | 20 | 8 | 5 | 7 | 30 | 30 | 0 | 29 | |
| 10 | Coventry United | 20 | 8 | 4 | 8 | 27 | 33 | −6 | 28 | |
| 11 | Rugby Borough | 20 | 8 | 3 | 9 | 30 | 37 | −7 | 27 | |
| 12 | AFC Rushden & Diamonds | 17 | 6 | 8 | 3 | 31 | 23 | +8 | 26 | |
| 13 | Bedworth United | 19 | 7 | 5 | 7 | 24 | 19 | +5 | 26 | |
| 14 | Basford United | 19 | 8 | 2 | 9 | 38 | 37 | +1 | 26 | |
| 15 | Grantham Town | 20 | 6 | 6 | 8 | 35 | 37 | −2 | 24 | |
| 16 | Boston Town | 20 | 6 | 6 | 8 | 29 | 38 | −9 | 24 | |
| 17 | Barwell | 20 | 5 | 7 | 8 | 26 | 27 | −1 | 22 | |
| 18 | Coleshill Town | 20 | 4 | 8 | 8 | 33 | 39 | −6 | 20 | |
| 19 | Corby Town | 20 | 3 | 8 | 9 | 24 | 40 | −16 | 17 | Relegation to Step 5 |
| 20 | Long Eaton United | 19 | 3 | 4 | 12 | 25 | 40 | −15 | 13 | Relegation to Step 5 |
| 21 | Bourne Town | 17 | 3 | 3 | 11 | 26 | 42 | −16 | 12 | Relegation to Step 5 |
| 22 | St Ives Town | 20 | 2 | 2 | 16 | 19 | 57 | −38 | 8 | Relegation to Step 5 |

Updated to match(es) played on 21 November 2026. Source: NPL official site
Rules for classification: 1) points; 2) goal difference; 3) number of goals scored; 4) number of matches won; 5) head-to-head results

=== Results table ===
| Home \ Away | R&D | BAR | BAS | BED | BEL | BSM | BOS | BOU | CAR | COL | COR | CVU | GRA | LEU | LOU | MIC | NUN | RUG | SHD | SIT | SCT | WEL |
|---|---|---|---|---|---|---|---|---|---|---|---|---|---|---|---|---|---|---|---|---|---|---|
| AFC Rushden & Diamonds | — | 0–0 | | 0–0 | | | | | | 0–0 | | | | | | 3–1 | 3–2 | 5–0 | 1–1 | | | |
| Barwell | 1–1 | — | 0–1 | | | | | | | 1–1 | 4–0 | 0–2 | 3–1 | | | | 1–0 | 1–1 | 0–3 | | 3–0 | |
| Basford United | | | — | 0–1 | 2–1 | | | 4–2 | | | 1–1 | | 2–4 | | 1–4 | 1–2 | | 6–1 | 0–1 | 5–1 | | 1–5 |
| Bedworth United | | 1–1 | | — | | | 0–2 | 6–1 | 1–1 | 0–0 | | 2–0 | 2–1 | 3–0 | | | | 1–2 | 1–0 | | | |
| Belper Town | 1–2 | | | 2–1 | — | 1–0 | | | 1–0 | | | 0–1 | 1–1 | | 2–1 | | | 0–2 | | | 2–4 | |
| Boldmere St Michaels | 1–1 | 2–1 | 1–3 | 1–0 | | — | | | 5–0 | | | 3–1 | | 1–3 | 0–4 | | 2–1 | | | 1–0 | | |
| Boston Town | | 3–2 | 1–2 | | 0–3 | 1–1 | — | 1–1 | | 2–2 | 2–1 | | | | 2–1 | | | 3–2 | | | | 0–2 |
| Bourne Town | | 2–2 | | | 1–2 | 1–1 | | — | | | 3–0 | 1–2 | | | | 2–3 | | | 1–3 | 4–3 | | 2–3 |
| Carlton Town | 4–2 | 3–2 | | | | 0–2 | 2–1 | 4–1 | — | 1–0 | | | | 3–2 | | | 0–2 | | | | 1–2 | 0–0 |
| Coleshill Town | | | 4–2 | 0–1 | 1–1 | 3–3 | | 1–0 | | — | 3–4 | | | 2–2 | | | | 1–3 | 1–5 | | 0–2 | |
| Corby Town | 3–3 | | | 2–1 | 0–0 | 2–2 | 1–3 | | 0–0 | | — | 1–2 | | | | 2–0 | | | 0–0 | | | 1–4 |
| Coventry United | 1–0 | | 1–3 | | | | 0–0 | | 0–3 | | | — | 1–1 | | 0–3 | 1–2 | | | 2–2 | | 4–1 | |
| Grantham Town | 2–3 | | | | | | 2–2 | | 2–2 | 2–3 | 2–0 | 3–0 | — | 3–1 | | | | 0–1 | 1–0 | 1–1 | | |
| Long Eaton United | 3–5 | | 0–0 | | 1–1 | | 4–1 | | | | | 0–1 | | — | 0–1 | | 0–2 | | 2–2 | 3–1 | | 1–4 |
| Loughborough Students | 1–0 | 3–0 | | 3–1 | 0–0 | | | 3–0 | 2–2 | | 3–3 | | 2–4 | | — | | | 3–2 | | | | |
| Mickleover | | 1–1 | | | | 2–0 | 2–0 | | | 1–1 | | | 2–0 | 2–0 | 0–6 | — | 2–1 | | | 4–0 | | |
| Nuneaton Town | | | | | 1–2 | | 2–1 | | | 3–2 | 0–0 | 3–1 | 5–0 | | 3–1 | 1–3 | — | | | | | 0–1 |
| Rugby Borough | | | 5–3 | | | 1–0 | | 1–2 | 0–2 | | | 4–4 | | 2–0 | | 1–1 | 0–2 | — | | 2–0 | 0–1 | 0–2 |
| Shepshed Dynamo | | | | | 0–0 | 1–3 | 5–1 | | 4–0 | | | | | 3–2 | | 1–1 | 1–2 | | — | 6–0 | 0–4 | 3–3 |
| St Ives Town | 2–2 | 1–3 | | | 0–5 | | | | 2–3 | 1–4 | 3–1 | 1–3 | | | 1–2 | | 0–1 | | | — | 1–0 | |
| Sutton Coldfield Town | | | 2–1 | 1–1 | | | 3–3 | | | | 4–2 | | 3–3 | 3–1 | 3–2 | 2–1 | 2–0 | | | 3–0 | — | |
| Wellingborough Town | | 1–0 | | 2–1 | | 4–1 | | 3–2 | | 5–4 | | | 3–2 | | 4–0 | 1–0 | | | | 4–1 | 2–1 | — |

Updated to match(es) played on 21 November 2026. Source: NPL official site
Legend: Blue = home team win; Yellow = draw; Red = away team win.

=== Top goalscorers ===
Updated 21 November 2026

| Rank | Player | Club | Goals |
|---|---|---|---|
| 1 | (England) Louis Czerwak | Grantham Town | 13 |
| 2 | (Zambia) Kash Kasukumya | Loughborough Students | 12 |
| 3 | (England) Jack O'Connor | Wellingborough Town | 11 |
| 4 | (England) Reece Gibson | Sutton Coldfield Town | 10 |
| 4 | (England) Charlie Manners | Coleshill Town | 10 |
| 6 | (England) Zacorie Allen | Bourne Town | 9 |
| 6 | (Antigua and Barbuda) Zayn Hakeem | Wellingborough Town | 9 |
| 6 | (England) Harry Limb | Boston Town | 9 |
| 6 | (England) Ayomide Abdul-Awwal Lekuti | Sutton Coldfield Town | 9 |
| 6 | (England) Manni Norkett | Mickleover | 9 |

=== Stadia and locations ===
Locations of Northern Premier League 2026–27 Division One Midlands teams

| Team | Location | Stadium | Capacity |
|---|---|---|---|
| AFC Rushden & Diamonds | Rushden | Hayden Road | 2,955 |
| Barwell | Barwell | Kirkby Road | 2,500 |
| Basford United | Nottingham (Basford) | Greenwich Avenue | 1,600 |
| Bedworth United | Bedworth | The Oval | 2,900 |
| Belper Town | Belper | Christchurch Meadow | 2,650 |
| Boldmere St Michaels | Boldmere | Trevor Brown Memorial Ground | 2,500 |
| Boston Town | Boston | Tattershall Road | 6,000 |
| Bourne Town | Bourne | Abbey Lawn | 2,000 |
| Carlton Town | Carlton | Bill Stokeld Stadium | 1,968 |
| Coleshill Town | Coleshill | Pack Meadow | 2,000 |
| Corby Town | Corby | Steel Park | 3,893 |
| Coventry United | Coventry | Nick Newbold Stadium | 4,000 |
| Grantham Town | Grantham | South Kesteven Sports Stadium | 7,500 |
| Long Eaton United | Long Eaton | Grange Park | 1,500 |
| Loughborough Students | Loughborough | Loughborough University Stadium | 3,300 |
| Mickleover | Mickleover | Station Road | 1,500 |
| Nuneaton Town | Nuneaton | The Oval | 4,614 |
| Rugby Borough | Rugby | Kilsby Lane | 1,000 |
| Shepshed Dynamo | Shepshed | The Dovecote Stadium | 2,500 |
| St Ives Town | St Ives | Westwood Road | 2,000 |
| Sutton Coldfield Town | Sutton Coldfield | Coles Lane | 2,000 |
| Wellingborough Town | Wellingborough | Dog & Duck Football Ground | 5,000 |

== Division One West ==
Northern Premier League Division One West
- Season: 2026–27

Division One West consists of 22 teams, 16 from the previous season and 6 new teams.

=== Team changes ===
To Division One West

Promoted from the Midland League Premier Division

- 1874 Northwich
- Hanley Town

Promoted from the North West Counties League Premier Division

- Padiham
- Wythenshawe

Relegated from the Premier Division

- Prescot Cables

Transferred from Division One Midlands

- Lichfield City

From Division One West

Promoted to the Premier Division

- Avro
- Bury

Relegated to the Midland League Premier Division

- Darlaston Town (1874)
- Sporting Khalsa
- Wythenshawe Town

Relegated to the North West Counties League Premier Division

- Trafford

=== Division One West table ===
| Pos | Team | Pld | W | D | L | GF | GA | GD | Pts | Promotion, qualification or relegation |
|---|---|---|---|---|---|---|---|---|---|---|
| 1 | Bootle | 18 | 15 | 2 | 1 | 45 | 12 | +33 | 47 | Promotion to the Premier Division |
| 2 | Stafford Rangers | 17 | 12 | 1 | 4 | 35 | 20 | +15 | 37 | Qualification for the play-off semi-finals |
| 3 | Wythenshawe | 20 | 11 | 4 | 5 | 38 | 27 | +11 | 37 | Qualification for the play-off semi-finals |
| 4 | Hanley Town | 19 | 11 | 2 | 6 | 39 | 24 | +15 | 35 | Qualification for the play-off quarter-finals |
| 5 | Mossley | 20 | 11 | 2 | 7 | 36 | 27 | +9 | 35 | Qualification for the play-off quarter-finals |
| 6 | Prescot Cables | 20 | 10 | 4 | 6 | 35 | 25 | +10 | 34 | Qualification for the play-off quarter-finals |
| 7 | Atherton Collieries | 18 | 10 | 3 | 5 | 32 | 26 | +6 | 33 | Qualification for the play-off quarter-finals |
| 8 | Clitheroe | 18 | 10 | 3 | 5 | 30 | 24 | +6 | 33 | |
| 9 | Witton Albion | 18 | 10 | 2 | 6 | 40 | 25 | +15 | 32 | |
| 10 | Shifnal Town | 20 | 9 | 1 | 10 | 31 | 39 | −8 | 28 | |
| 11 | Nantwich Town | 20 | 7 | 5 | 8 | 36 | 31 | +5 | 26 | |
| 12 | Stalybridge Celtic | 19 | 7 | 5 | 7 | 34 | 33 | +1 | 26 | |
| 13 | Runcorn Linnets | 20 | 6 | 6 | 8 | 32 | 37 | −5 | 24 | |
| 14 | Lower Breck | 20 | 7 | 3 | 10 | 37 | 44 | −7 | 24 | |
| 15 | Padiham | 21 | 6 | 6 | 9 | 33 | 42 | −9 | 24 | |
| 16 | Newcastle Town | 20 | 7 | 2 | 11 | 34 | 32 | +2 | 23 | |
| 17 | Congleton Town | 20 | 6 | 5 | 9 | 30 | 30 | 0 | 23 | |
| 18 | Kidsgrove Athletic | 19 | 7 | 2 | 10 | 19 | 27 | −8 | 23 | |
| 19 | Chasetown | 20 | 5 | 6 | 9 | 34 | 41 | −7 | 21 | Relegation to Step 5 |
| 20 | Vauxhall Motors | 20 | 4 | 6 | 10 | 25 | 43 | −18 | 18 | Relegation to Step 5 |
| 21 | 1874 Northwich | 21 | 2 | 5 | 14 | 20 | 44 | −24 | 11 | Relegation to Step 5 |
| 22 | Lichfield City | 20 | 2 | 3 | 15 | 18 | 60 | −42 | 9 | Relegation to Step 5 |

Updated to match(es) played on 21 November 2026. Source: NPL official site
Rules for classification: 1) points; 2) goal difference; 3) number of goals scored; 4) number of matches won; 5) head-to-head results

=== Results table ===
| Home \ Away | 18N | ATC | BOO | CHA | CLI | CON | HAN | KGA | LIC | LWB | MOS | NAN | NEW | PAD | PRE | RUN | SHI | STR | SBC | VHM | WIT | WYT |
|---|---|---|---|---|---|---|---|---|---|---|---|---|---|---|---|---|---|---|---|---|---|---|
| 1874 Northwich | — | | | 2–0 | | 1–1 | | 0–1 | | 4–2 | | 0–3 | 0–1 | 2–2 | 0–1 | | | | 2–2 | 1–1 | | 1–2 |
| Atherton Collieries | 1–1 | — | | | | 0–4 | 1–0 | | | 2–0 | 2–4 | | | 0–1 | 3–1 | | | | | 1–2 | 4–1 | |
| Bootle | 6–3 | 1–1 | — | | | | | 1–0 | | | | 2–0 | 4–2 | | | 3–1 | 3–0 | | 2–0 | | | |
| Chasetown | | | 1–3 | — | | 1–1 | 2–4 | 1–2 | 3–2 | | | | | 2–0 | 3–4 | | | | 2–2 | | 3–1 | 1–5 |
| Clitheroe | 3–0 | | | 3–2 | — | 3–4 | | | | 0–1 | 0–4 | | | | | 1–1 | | | 2–1 | 2–0 | 3–1 | |
| Congleton Town | | | 0–1 | | | — | | | 0–1 | | 3–0 | | 2–1 | 4–3 | 0–2 | | 1–2 | 0–1 | | 1–1 | | 0–0 |
| Hanley Town | 3–0 | | 1–0 | | 2–3 | | — | 2–1 | | | | 1–0 | 3–2 | 4–0 | 1–2 | | | | | 2–1 | | 3–0 |
| Kidsgrove Athletic | | | | 0–2 | 1–1 | 2–1 | | — | 2–0 | 1–1 | | 1–4 | | 1–0 | | | 0–1 | | | | | 0–2 |
| Lichfield City | | 0–0 | 1–1 | | 1–2 | | 1–5 | | — | | 1–4 | | 1–5 | | | | 1–1 | 0–3 | 0–5 | | 1–6 | |
| Lower Breck | | 6–1 | 0–4 | 2–1 | | | 2–2 | | 4–1 | — | 1–3 | | | | 0–1 | | 2–0 | 5–3 | | | | |
| Mossley | 3–2 | | 0–3 | 3–0 | 0–1 | | 2–1 | | | | — | 1–1 | 2–1 | | 3–2 | 0–1 | | | | | 1–0 | |
| Nantwich Town | | 1–2 | | 2–2 | | 4–0 | | | | 3–2 | | — | | 3–0 | 1–3 | 3–1 | | 0–1 | | | 0–3 | 2–2 |
| Newcastle Town | 1–0 | 0–3 | | 1–1 | 0–2 | | | 2–0 | | 4–1 | | 1–1 | — | | | 3–0 | | 0–2 | | 2–3 | | |
| Padiham | 2–0 | | 0–1 | | | | | | 6–1 | 4–0 | 1–1 | | 0–5 | — | 3–1 | 2–2 | 1–4 | 0–4 | 1–1 | | | |
| Prescot Cables | | | | | 1–0 | | | 0–1 | 5–0 | | | | 2–0 | 1–1 | — | 1–1 | 2–0 | | | 1–1 | 1–2 | 1–1 |
| Runcorn Linnets | 4–0 | 1–2 | 0–2 | 1–1 | | 2–2 | 3–2 | | 2–0 | 3–2 | | | | | | — | | | 4–2 | 2–2 | | |
| Shifnal Town | 3–1 | 3–4 | | 1–4 | 1–2 | | 1–2 | | 4–2 | | 0–4 | 3–2 | | | | | — | | 2–1 | | 0–4 | |
| Stafford Rangers | 2–0 | 0–1 | | | 2–2 | | | 2–1 | | | 3–0 | 3–1 | | | | 3–2 | 0–4 | — | | | | 3–1 |
| Stalybridge Celtic | | 0–4 | | | | 1–0 | 1–1 | 3–1 | | 2–2 | | 0–2 | | | 4–3 | | | 3–1 | — | | | 0–1 |
| Vauxhall Motors | | | 0–4 | 2–2 | | 1–5 | | 2–4 | 2–1 | | 2–1 | 3–3 | | | | | 0–1 | 0–2 | 1–3 | — | | |
| Witton Albion | | | 2–4 | | | 3–1 | | 2–0 | | 2–0 | | | 1–0 | 1–1 | | 5–1 | | | 2–3 | 3–1 | — | 1–1 |
| Wythenshawe | | | | | 2–0 | | 2–0 | | 0–3 | 3–4 | 2–0 | | 4–3 | 4–5 | | 1–0 | 3–0 | | | 2–0 | | — |

Updated to match(es) played on 21 November 2026. Source: NPL official site
Legend: Blue = home team win; Yellow = draw; Red = away team win.
For upcoming matches, an "a" indicates there is an article about the rivalry between the two participants.

=== Top goalscorers ===
Updated 21 November 2026

| Rank | Player | Club | Goals |
|---|---|---|---|
| 1 | (England) Charlie Frost | Mossley | 15 |
| 1 | (England) Ben Hodkinson | Bootle | 15 |
| 1 | (England) Lewis Porter | Hanley Town | 15 |
| 4 | (England) Freddy Garbutt | Witton Albion | 13 |
| 4 | (England) Luca Whitney | Newcastle Town | 13 |
| 6 | (England) Sam Burns | Lower Breck | 12 |
| 6 | (England) Luke Gill | Lower Breck | 12 |
| 8 | (England) Jack Price | Padiham | 10 |
| 9 | (England) Matthew Hearsey | Chasetown | 9 |
| 9 | (England) Ben Kershaw | Mossley | 9 |
| 9 | (Sweden) Joel Mumbongo | Wythenshawe | 9 |

=== Stadia and locations ===
Locations of Northern Premier League 2026–27 Division One West teams in the North West
Locations of Northern Premier League 2026–27 Premier Division teams (Greater Manchester)
Locations of Northern Premier League 2026–27 Division One West teams in the West Midlands

| Team | Location | Stadium | Capacity |
|---|---|---|---|
| 1874 Northwich | Barnton | The Offside Trust Stadium | 3,000 |
| Atherton Collieries | Atherton | Alder Street | 2,500 |
| Bootle | Bootle | New Bucks Park | 2,500 |
| Chasetown | Burntwood | The Scholars Ground | 3,000 |
| Clitheroe | Clitheroe | EcoGiants Stadium | 2,000 |
| Congleton Town | Congleton | Cleric Stadium | 1,500 |
| Hanley Town | Stoke-on-Trent | Potteries Park | 1,300 |
| Kidsgrove Athletic | Kidsgrove | The Autonet Insurance Stadium | 2,000 |
| Lichfield City | Lichfield | City Ground | 1,500 |
| Lower Breck | Liverpool (Anfield) | Anfield Sports and Community Centre | 1,000 |
| Mossley | Mossley | Seel Park | 4,000 |
| Nantwich Town | Nantwich | The Weaver Stadium | 3,500 |
| Newcastle Town | Newcastle-under-Lyme | Lyme Valley Stadium | 4,000 |
| Padiham | Padiham | Arbories Memorial Sports Ground | 1,688 |
| Prescot Cables | Prescot | IP Truck Parts Stadium | 2,070 |
| Runcorn Linnets | Runcorn | APEC Taxis Stadium | 1,600 |
| Shifnal Town | Shifnal | Acoustafoam Stadium | 1,500 |
| Stafford Rangers | Stafford | Marston Road | 4,150 |
| Stalybridge Celtic | Stalybridge | Bower Fold | 6,500 |
| Vauxhall Motors | Ellesmere Port | Rivacre Park | 3,300 |
| Witton Albion | Northwich | Wincham Park | 4,813 |
| Wythenshawe | Wythenshawe | Hollyhedge Park | 1,000 |
