= 1994–95 Northern Football League =

The 1994–95 Northern Football League season was the 97th in the history of Northern Football League, a football competition in England.

== Division One ==
Northern Football League Division One
- Season: 1994–95
- Champions: Tow Law Town
- Relegated: Northallerton Town; Prudhoe Town
- Matches: 380
- Goals: 1,301 (3.42 per match)

Division One featured 17 clubs which competed in the division last season, along with three new clubs, promoted from Division Two:

- Bedlington Terriers
- Peterlee Newtown
- Prudhoe East End, who also changed name to Prudhoe Town

Also, Newcastle Blue Star changed name to RTM Newcastle.

=== League table ===
Pos	Team	Pld	W	D	L	GF	GA	GD	Pts	Promotion or relegation
1	Tow Law Town	38	28	6	4	105	39	+66	90	
2	Billingham Synthonia	38	23	7	8	99	35	+64	76	
3	Whitby Town	38	22	10	6	88	45	+43	76	
4	Bedlington Terriers	38	21	12	5	72	35	+37	75	
5	RTM Newcastle	38	21	9	8	93	42	+51	72	
6	Guisborough Town	38	19	11	8	79	48	+31	68	
7	Durham City	38	17	12	9	75	45	+30	63	
8	Dunston Federation Brewery	38	16	12	10	70	62	+8	60	
9	Consett	38	15	11	12	74	55	+19	56	
10	Shildon	38	12	13	13	57	63	−6	49	
11	Hebburn	38	14	9	15	57	68	−11	48 (Note: Hebburn were deducted three points.)	Demoted to Division Two
12	West Auckland Town	38	13	8	17	47	61	−14	47	
13	Seaham Red Star	38	14	6	18	72	72	0	45 (Note: Seaham Red Star were deducted three points.)	
14	Peterlee Newtown	38	12	9	17	62	80	−18	45	
15	Murton	38	10	5	23	48	89	−41	35	
16	Chester-le-Street Town	38	8	7	23	57	99	−42	31	
17	Ferryhill Athletic	38	9	6	23	34	80	−46	30 (Note: Ferryhill Athletic were deducted three points.)	
18	Eppleton Colliery Welfare	38	8	4	26	38	97	−59	28	
19	Northallerton Town	38	9	3	26	35	93	−58	27 (Note: Northallerton Town were deducted three points.)	Relegated to Division Two
20	Prudhoe Town	38	6	6	26	39	93	−54	24	Relegated to Division Two

Source: fchd
Rules for classification: 1) points; 2) goal difference; 3) number of goals scored.

== Division Two ==
Northern Football League Division Two
- Season: 1994–95
- Champions: Whickham
- Promoted: Whickham; Crook Town; Stockton
- Matches: 380
- Goals: 1,463 (3.85 per match)

Division Two featured 16 clubs which competed in the division last season, along with four new clubs.

- Clubs relegated from Division One:
  - Brandon United
  - Stockton
- Plus:
  - Hartlepool Town, joined from the Wearside Football League
  - Morpeth Town, joined from the Northern Football Alliance

=== League table ===
Pos	Team	Pld	W	D	L	GF	GA	GD	Pts	Promotion or relegation
1	Whickham	38	26	10	2	103	37	+66	88	Promoted to Division One
2	Crook Town	38	26	6	6	102	40	+62	84	Promoted to Division One
3	Stockton	38	26	5	7	116	49	+67	77 (Note: Stockton were deducted six points.)	Promoted to Division One
4	Brandon United	38	21	9	8	77	39	+38	72	
5	Billingham Town	38	23	4	11	95	50	+45	70 (Note: Billingham Town were deducted three points.)	
6	Hartlepool Town	38	22	9	7	91	50	+41	69 (Note: Harltepool Town were deducted six points.)	Resigned from the league
7	Ashington	38	19	2	17	77	66	+11	59	
8	Evenwood Town	38	17	8	13	72	63	+9	59	
9	Washington	38	17	9	12	74	55	+19	57 (Note: Washington were deducted three points.)	
10	Easington Colliery	38	15	10	13	55	51	+4	55	
11	Willington	38	17	3	18	62	61	+1	54	
12	Shotton Comrades	38	15	8	15	86	83	+3	53	
13	Esh Winning	38	15	7	16	78	88	−10	52	
14	Morpeth Town	38	13	6	19	69	67	+2	45	
15	Ryhope Community	38	12	9	17	55	62	−7	45	
16	Norton & Stockton Ancients	38	13	4	21	71	83	−12	43	
17	Alnwick Town	38	10	6	22	61	88	−27	33 (Note: Alnwick Town were deducted three points.)	
18	Darlington Cleveland Social	38	4	5	29	37	140	−103	17	
19	Horden Colliery Welfare	38	3	3	32	42	151	−109	12	
20	Langley Park	38	3	3	32	40	140	−100	9 (Note: Langley Park were deducted three points.)	Club folded

Source: fchd
Rules for classification: 1) points; 2) goal difference; 3) number of goals scored.
