= 2017–18 Wearside Football League =

Wearside Football League
- Season: 2017–18
- Champions: Redcar Athletic
- Promoted: Cleator Moor Celtic

The 2017–18 Wearside Football League season is the 126th in the history of Wearside Football League, a football competition in England.

Wearside Football League consists of 18 clubs.

The following 3 clubs left the Wearside League before the season -

- Jarrow – promoted to Northern League Division Two
- Seaham Red Star Reserves - folded
- Ashbrooke Belford House - folded

The following club joined the Wearside League before the season -

- Hebburn Town Reserves

== League table ==
Pos	Team	Pld	W	D	L	GF	GA	GD	Pts	Promotion, qualification or relegation
1	Redcar Athletic (C, P)	32	25	5	2	98	32	+66	80	Promotion to Northern League Division Two
2	Cleator Moor Celtic (P)	32	25	4	3	112	26	+86	79	Promotion to the North West Counties League Division One North
3	Sunderland West End	32	20	6	6	105	42	+63	66	
4	Hebburn Town Reserves	32	20	4	8	74	38	+36	64	
5	Boldon CA	32	19	7	6	68	43	+25	64	
6	Richmond Town	32	16	5	11	73	49	+24	53	
7	Silksworth Colliery Welfare	32	15	5	12	70	54	+16	50	
8	Wolviston	32	16	2	14	73	64	+9	50	
9	Hartlepool	32	14	5	13	80	55	+25	47	
10	Gateshead Leam Rangers	32	12	5	15	46	64	−18	41	
11	Darlington Reserves	32	12	4	16	76	63	+13	40	
12	Harton and Westoe CW	32	8	7	17	49	83	−34	31	
13	Annfield Plain	32	8	2	22	38	102	−64	26	
14	Stokesley Sports Club	32	7	4	21	56	112	−56	25	
15	South Shields Reserves	32	8	0	24	50	106	−56	24	
16	Windscale	32	6	5	21	46	107	−61	23	
17	Coxhoe Athletic	32	4	4	24	42	116	−74	16	
18	Prudhoe Town (R)	0	0	0	0	0	0	0	0	Resigned from the league as of 14/03/2018

Updated to match(es) played on 18 May 2018. Source: Wearside Football League table
Rules for classification: 1) Points; 2) Goal difference; 3) Number of goals scored; 4) Number of matches won; 5) Head-to-head results
(C) Champions; (P) Promoted; (R) Relegated
