= 2018–19 Northern Football League =

Northern Football League
- Season: 2018–19

The 2018–19 season was the 121st in the history of the Northern Football League, a football competition in England. The league has operated two divisions in the English football league system, Division One at step 5, and Division Two at step 6.

== Division One ==
Northern Football League Division One
- Season: 2018–19
- Champions: Dunston UTS
- Promoted: Dunston UTS
- Matches: 306
- Goals: 1,143 (3.74 per match)

After Team Northumbria resigned from the league and disbanded during the close season, Division One featured 16 clubs which competed in the division last season, along with three new clubs, promoted from Division Two:

- Blyth
- Hebburn Town
- Whickham

=== Division One table ===
Pos	Team	Pld	W	D	L	GF	GA	GD	Pts	Promotion or relegation
1	Dunston UTS	34	26	5	3	79	30	+49	83	Promoted to the Northern Premier League
2	Hebburn Town	34	19	9	6	85	62	+23	66	
3	Bishop Auckland	34	18	8	8	84	53	+31	62	
4	Consett	34	18	7	9	80	58	+22	61	
5	Sunderland RCA	34	19	4	11	69	47	+22	61	
6	Shildon	34	16	8	10	62	46	+16	56	
7	Stockton Town	34	16	6	12	85	56	+29	54	
8	West Auckland Town	34	14	11	9	62	40	+22	53	
9	North Shields	34	16	4	14	58	55	+3	52	
10	Newcastle Benfield	34	15	6	13	59	65	−6	51	
11	Ryhope Colliery Welfare	34	14	5	15	64	70	−6	47	
12	Newton Aycliffe	34	9	9	16	49	66	−17	36	
13	Whitley Bay	34	9	7	18	58	88	−30	34	
14	Seaham Red Star	34	9	6	19	56	87	−31	33	
15	Guisborough Town	34	8	7	19	56	69	−13	31	
16	Ashington	34	7	8	19	44	65	−21	29	
17	Whickham	34	6	7	21	54	86	−32	25	
18	Penrith	34	5	7	22	39	100	−61	22	Reprieved from relegation
19	Blyth	0	0	0	0	0	0	0	0 (Note: Blyth resigned from the league due to a lack of support and permanent home ground. Club record W=4 D=0 L=0 expunged.)	Club folded, record expunged

Source: NL website
Rules for classification: 1) Points; 2) Goal difference; 3) Number of goals scored; 4) Number of matches won; 5) Head-to-head results

=== Stadia and locations ===
Location of Division One clubs

Club	Stadium	Capacity
Ashington	Woodhorn Lane	
Blyth	Woodhorn Lane	
Bishop Auckland	Heritage Park	1,950
Consett	Belle View Stadium	
Dunston UTS	Wellington Road	2,500
Guisborough Town	King George V Ground	
Hebburn Town	Hebburn Sports & Social Ground	
Newcastle Benfield	Sam Smith’s Park	2,000
Newton Aycliffe	Moore Lane Park	
North Shields	Ralph Gardner Park	1,500
Penrith	Frenchfield Stadium	1,500
Ryhope Colliery Welfare	Ryhope Recreation Ground	
Seaham Red Star	Seaham Town Park	
Shildon	Dean Street	2,000
Stockton Town	Bishopton Road West	1,800
Sunderland RCA	Meadow Park	1,500
West Auckland Town	Darlington Road	2,000
Whickham	Glebe Sports Ground	4,000
Whitley Bay	Hillheads Park	4,500

== Division Two ==
Northern Football League Division Two
- Season: 2018–19
- Champions: Billingham Town
- Promoted: Billingham Town; Thornaby; Northallerton Town
- Matches: 380
- Goals: 1,386 (3.65 per match)

Division Two featured 16 clubs which competed in the division last season, along with four new clubs:

- Billingham Synthonia, relegated from Division One
- Birtley Town, promoted from the Northern Alliance
- Redcar Athletic, promoted from the Wearside League
- Washington, relegated from Division One

=== Division Two table ===
Pos	Team	Pld	W	D	L	GF	GA	GD	Pts	Promotion or relegation
1	Billingham Town	38	29	6	3	106	37	+69	93	Promoted to Division One
2	Thornaby	38	29	4	5	98	37	+61	91	Promoted to Division One
3	Northallerton Town	38	23	6	9	86	55	+31	75	Promoted to Division One
4	Heaton Stannington	38	20	6	12	76	48	+28	66	
5	Chester-le-Street Town	38	18	8	12	66	57	+9	62	
6	West Allotment Celtic	38	18	6	14	71	58	+13	60	
7	Redcar Athletic	38	15	11	12	86	66	+20	56	
8	Willington	38	15	11	12	70	57	+13	56	
9	Crook Town	38	16	8	14	82	70	+12	56	
10	Billingham Synthonia	38	15	10	13	65	52	+13	55	
11	Jarrow	38	14	10	14	63	71	−8	52	
12	Ryton & Crawcrook Albion	38	14	9	15	57	61	−4	51	
13	Birtley Town	38	13	9	16	62	73	−11	48	
14	Bedlington Terriers	38	13	7	18	79	96	−17	46	
15	Tow Law Town	38	11	10	17	62	72	−10	43	
16	Easington Colliery	38	12	7	19	75	91	−16	43	
17	Esh Winning	38	10	10	18	63	81	−18	40	
18	Washington	38	9	2	27	46	86	−40	29	
19	Brandon United	38	6	8	24	43	95	−52	26	Reprieved from relegation
20	Durham City	38	5	2	31	30	123	−93	17	Reprieved from relegation

Source: NL website
Rules for classification: 1) Points; 2) Goal difference; 3) Number of goals scored; 4) Number of matches won; 5) Head-to-head results

=== Stadia and locations ===
Location of Division Two clubs

Club	Stadium	Capacity
Bedlington Terriers	Welfare Park	3,000
Billingham Synthonia	Norton Sports Complex	1,970
Billingham Town	Bedford Terrace	3,000
Birtley Town	Birtley Sports Complex	
Brandon United	Welfare Ground	
Chester-le-Street Town	Moor Park	
Crook Town	The Sir Tom Cowie Millfield Ground	1,500
Easington Colliery	Welfare Park	
Esh Winning	West Terrace	3,500
Heaton Stannington	Grounsell Park	
Jarrow	Perth Green	
Northallerton Town	Calvert Stadium	
Redcar Athletic	Green Lane	
Ryton & Crawcrook Albion	Kingsley Park	1,500
Thornaby	Teesdale Park	5,000
Tow Law Town	Ironworks Road	3,000
Washington	Nissan Sports and Leisure Complex	1,000
West Allotment Celtic	Druid Park	
Willington	Hall Lane	
Durham City	Hall Lane	
