= 2026–27 FA Trophy =

2025–26 football tournament

FA Trophy
Football Association Trophy

Tournament details
- Country: England; Wales
- Dates: Qualifying rounds: 15 August 2026 – 26 September 2026; Competition Proper: 24 October 2026 – 16 May 2027
- Teams: 336

The 2026–27 FA Trophy (known for sponsorship reasons as the 2026–27 Isuzu FA Trophy) is the 58th edition of the FA Trophy, an annual football competition for teams at levels 5–8 of the English football league system.

Southend United are the defending champions, having won the 2025–26 edition.

== Format and eligibility ==
The calendar and entries were announced by The Football Association on 5 June 2026.

Southend United are the reigning champions for the 2025–26 season, having defeated Wealdstone 0–0 (4–2 p) in the 2026 FA Trophy final at Wembley Stadium.

| Round | Main Date | Number of Fixtures | Clubs Remaining | New Entries This Round | Losing Club | Winning Club |
| Preliminary round | 15 August 2026 | 16 | 336 → 320 | 32 | £400 | £1,500 |
| First round qualifying | 29 August 2026 | 80 | 320 → 240 | 144 | £400 | £1,500 |
| Second round qualifying | 12 September 2026 | 40 | 240 → 200 | none | £575 | £2,250 |
| Third round qualifying | 26 September 2026 | 64 | 200 → 136 | 88 | £625 | £2,450 |
| First round proper | 24 October 2026 | 32 | 136 → 104 | none | £775 | £3,000 |
| Second round proper | 14 November 2026 | 40 | 104 → 64 | 48 | £1,000 | £3,750 |
| Third round proper | 12 December 2026 | 32 | 64 → 32 | 24 | £1,250 | £4,500 |
| Fourth round proper | 16 January 2027 | 16 | 32 → 16 | none | £1,500 | £5,250 |
| Fifth round proper | 6 February 2027 | 8 | 16 → 8 | none | £1,750 | £6,000 |
| Quarter-finals | 6 March 2027 | 4 | 8 → 4 | none | £2,000 | £7,500 |
| Semi-finals | 3 April 2027 | 2 | 4 → 2 | none | £5,000 | £15,000 |
| Final | 16 May 2027 | 1 | 2 → 1 | none | £30,000 | £60,000 |

== Preliminary round ==
The draw for the preliminary round was made on 3 July 2026.

Number of teams per tier still in competition
| Tier 5 | Tier 6 | Tier 7 | Tier 8 | Total |
|---|---|---|---|---|
| 24 / 24 | 48 / 48 | 88 / 88 | 176 / 176 | 336 / 336 |

| Tie | Home team | Score | Away team | Att. |
Saturday 15 August 2026
| 11 | Hayes & Yeading United (8) | 2–2 (4–1 p) | Jersey Bulls (8) | 159 |
Match played at Hayes & Yeading United
| 1 | Congleton Town (8) | 1–0 | Beverley Town (8) | 411 |
| 2 | Pontefract Collieries (8) | 2-1 | Clitheroe (8) | 275 |
| 3 | Boldmere St Michaels (8) | 2–0 | Long Eaton United (8) | 128 |
| 4 | Sporting Club Inkberrow (8) | 1–4 | Barwell (8) | 138 |
| 5 | Haringey Borough (8) | 2–1 | Biggleswade Town (8) | 230 |
| 6 | Buckhurst Hill (8) | 0–1 | Welwyn Garden City (8) | 125 |
| 7 | Hadley (8) | 0–2 | Stotfold (8) | 132 |

| Tie | Home team | Score | Away team | Att. |
|---|---|---|---|---|
| 8 | Felixstowe & Walton United (8) | 0–2 | Mulbarton Wanderers (8) | 300 |
| 9 | Cobham (8) | 0–3 | Egham Town (8) | 116 |
| 10 | South Park (8) | 2–1 | Broadbridge Heath (8) | 129 |
| 13 | Herne Bay (8) | 3–2 | Harrow Borough (8) | 269 |
| 14 | Deal Town (8) | 1–1 (4–2 p) | Hartley Wintney (8) | 391 |
| 15 | Paulton Rovers (8) | 0–2 | Slimbridge (8) | 132 |
| 16 | AFC Stoneham (8) | 2–2 (5–4 p) | Barnstaple Town (8) | 121 |
Sunday 16 August 2026
| 12 | Merstham (8) | 3–2 | Ashford Town (Middlesex) (8) | 131 |

== First qualifying round ==
The draw for the first qualifying round was made on 3 July 2026.

Number of teams per tier still in competition
| Tier 5 | Tier 6 | Tier 7 | Tier 8 | Total |
|---|---|---|---|---|
| 24 / 24 | 48 / 48 | 88 / 88 | 160 / 176 | 320 / 336 |

| Tie | Home team | Score | Away team | Att. |
Friday 28 August 2026
| 2 | Prescot Cables (8) | 4–1 | Vauxhall Motors (8) | 426 |
| 10 | Garforth Town (8) | 2–2 (4–5 p) | Bridlington Town (8) | 348 |
| 40 | Potters Bar Town (8) | 2–1 | Barton Rovers (8) | 147 |
| 53 | Ascot United (8) | 3–0 | Margate (8) | 174 |
| 56 | AFC Portchester (8) | 1–3 | Whitstable Town (8) | 121 |
Match was played at Chichester City.
| 61 | Aylesbury United (8) | 6–4 | Sittingbourne (8) | 144 |
| 68 | Littlehampton Town (8) | 2–2 (6–7 p) | Raynes Park Vale (8) | 149 |
| 69 | Steyning Town (8) | 1–1 (2–4 p) | Moneyfields (8) | 130 |
Saturday 29 August 2026
| 1 | Liversedge (8) | 0–5 | Bootle (8) | 247 |
| 3 | Hallam (8) | 3–3 (5–3 p) | Mossley (8) | 243 |
Match was played at Mossley.
| 4 | Stocksbridge Park Steels (8) | 1–2 | Runcorn Linnets (8) | 177 |
| 5 | Heaton Stannington (8) | 0–1 | Wythenshawe (8) | 411 |
| 6 | Padiham (8) | 0–7 | Pontefract Collieries (8) | 175 |
| 7 | Guisborough Town (8) | 3–2 | Ossett United (8) | 317 |
| 8 | Congleton Town (8) | 4–1 | Atherton Collieries (8) | 346 |
| 9 | Lower Breck (8) | 4–0 | North Ferriby (8) | 142 |
| 11 | Stalybridge Celtic (8) | 2–1 | Bradford (Park Avenue) (8) | 437 |
| 12 | Blyth Spartans (8) | 2–0 | 1874 Northwich (8) | 608 |
| 13 | Morpeth Town (8) | 2–0 | Witton Albion (8) | 217 |
| 14 | Silsden (8) | 3–2 | Consett (8) | 133 |
| 15 | Ashington (8) | 3–1 | West Auckland Town (8) | 303 |
| 16 | Grimsby Borough (8) | 0–1 | Dunston (8) | 86 |
| 17 | Newcastle Town (8) | 0–3 | Bourne Town (8) | 114 |
| 18 | Lincoln United (8) | 1–1 (2–4 p) | Nuneaton Town (8) | 210 |
| 19 | Chasetown (8) | 3–1 | AFC Rushden & Diamonds (8) | 236 |
| 20 | Hanley Town (8) | 2–0 | Coleshill Town (8) | 109 |
| 21 | Carlton Town (8) | 2–3 | Shepshed Dynamo (8) | 130 |
| 22 | Loughborough Students (8) | 1–0 | Barwell (8) | 95 |
| 23 | Corby Town (8) | 0–2 | Stafford Rangers (8) | 341 |
| 24 | Boldmere St Michaels (8) | 1–1 (5–4 p) | St Ives Town (8) | 90 |
| 25 | Grantham Town (8) | 1–3 | Mickleover (8) | 181 |
| 26 | Lichfield City (8) | 0–5 | Matlock Town (8) | 192 |
| 27 | Coventry United (8) | 1–3 | Kidsgrove Athletic (8) | 153 |
Match was played at Kidsgrove Athletic.
| 28 | Basford United (8) | 0–0 (1–3 p) | Bedworth United (8) | 105 |
| 29 | Shifnal Town (8) | 4–2 | Rugby Borough (8) | 105 |
| 30 | Worcester Raiders (8) | 1–2 | Sutton Coldfield Town (8) | 109 |
| 31 | Wellingborough Town (8) | 2–1 | Belper Town (8) | 136 |
| 32 | Boston Town (8) | 1–2 | Nantwich Town (8) | 156 |
| 33 | Fakenham Town (8) | 2–1 | Wroxham (8) | 205 |

| Tie | Home team | Score | Away team | Att. |
|---|---|---|---|---|
| 34 | Concord Rangers (8) | 1–1 (4–2 p) | Witham Town (8) | 166 |
| 35 | Winslow United (8) | A–A | Milton Keynes Irish (8) | 150 |
Match was abandoned 0–0 at 21 minutes due to a waterlogged pitch.
| 36 | Haringey Borough (8) | 2–2 (5–6 p) | Newmarket Town (8) | 177 |
| 37 | Little Oakley (8) | 2–2 (1–4 p) | Biggleswade (8) | 81 |
| 38 | Waltham Abbey (8) | 2–0 | Bowers & Pitsea (8) | 171 |
| 39 | Stotfold (8) | 0–3 | Gorleston (8) | 95 |
| 41 | Cambridge City (8) | 1–1 (4–3 p) | Redbridge (8) | 321 |
| 42 | AFC Sudbury (8) | 3–1 | Lowestoft Town (8) | 135 |
| 43 | Welwyn Garden City (8) | 3–0 | Mulbarton Wanderers (8) | 136 |
| 44 | Walthamstow (8) | 3–2 | Leverstock Green (8) | 165 |
| 45 | Canvey Island (8) | 4–1 | Grays Athletic (8) | 277 |
| 46 | Tilbury (8) | 0–0 (3–4 p) | Hertford Town (8) | 129 |
| 47 | Hashtag United (8) | 3–1 | Royston Town (8) | 103 |
| 48 | Ware (8) | 1–1 (5–4 p) | Brightlingsea Regent (8) | 155 |
| 49 | London Lions (8) | 0–2 | Takeley (8) | 58 |
| 50 | Beaconsfield Town (8) | 1–1 (4–5 p) | Sheppey United (8) | 94 |
| 51 | Peacehaven & Telscombe (8) | 2–1 | Merstham (8) | 239 |
| 52 | Marlow (8) | 0–4 | Hayes & Yeading United (8) | 151 |
| 54 | Bognor Regis Town (8) | 3–0 | South Park (Reigate) (8) | 313 |
| 55 | Windsor & Eton (8) | 0–2 | Southall (8) | 274 |
| 57 | Flackwell Heath (8) | 0–3 | Faversham Town (8) | 145 |
| 58 | AFC Croydon Athletic (8) | 3–2 | Sevenoaks Town (8) | 83 |
| 59 | Punjab United (8) | 0–2 | Horley Town (8) | 100 |
| 60 | Westfield (8) | 1–2 | Egham Town (8) | 113 |
| 62 | Erith Town (8) | 1–1 (5–4 p) | Cray Valley (PM) (8) | 120 |
| 63 | Crowborough Athletic (8) | 2–4 | Ashford United (8) | 262 |
| 64 | Binfield (8) | 2–4 | Deal Town (8) | 101 |
| 65 | Eastbourne Town (8) | 1–0 | Bedfont Sports Club (8) | 67 |
| 66 | Herne Bay | 3–3 (4–2 p) | Kingstonian (8) | 287 |
| 67 | Hastings United (8) | 2–1 | Hendon (8) | 576 |
| 70 | Bishop's Cleeve (8) | 1–3 | Bristol Manor Farm (8) | 133 |
| 71 | Hartpury (8) | 4–1 | Exmouth Town (8) | 112 |
Match was played at Gloucester City.
| 72 | Swindon Supermarine (8) | 0–1 | Slimbridge (8) | 182 |
| 73 | Portland United (8) | 3–1 | Hungerford Town (8) | 160 |
| 74 | Bideford (8) | 1–2 | Tiverton Town (8) | 272 |
| 75 | AFC Stoneham (8) | 2–0 | Shaftesbury (8) | 114 |
| 76 | Willand Rovers (8) | 2–1 | Falmouth Town (8) | 154 |
| 77 | Weymouth (8) | 5–1 | Melksham Town (8) | 712 |
| 78 | Larkhall Athletic (8) | 2–1 | Dorchester Town (8) | 130 |
| 79 | Westbury United (8) | 0–1 | Thame United (8) | 184 |
| 80 | Didcot Town (8) | 1–1 (4–3 p) | Winchester City (8) | 236 |
Wednesday 2 September 2026
| 35 | Winslow United (8) | 3–3 (5–3 p) | Milton Keynes Irish (8) | 227 |

== Second qualifying round ==
The draw for the second qualifying round was made on 1 September 2026.

Number of teams per tier still in competition
| Tier 5 | Tier 6 | Tier 7 | Tier 8 | Total |
|---|---|---|---|---|
| 24 / 24 | 48 / 48 | 88 / 88 | 80 / 176 | 240 / 336 |

| Tie | Home team | Score | Away team | Att. |
Saturday 12 September 2026
| 6 | Wythenshawe (8) | 0–4 | Blyth Spartans (8) | 236 |
| 1 | Bridlington Town (8) | 3–2 | Congleton Town (8) | 191 |
| 3 | Silsden (8) | 1–5 | Bootle (8) | 158 |
| 4 | Ashington (8) | 1–1 (3–4 p) | Guisborough Town (8) | 365 |
| 5 | Stalybridge Celtic (8) | 3–2 | Lower Breck (8) | 433 |
| 7 | Pontefract Collieries (8) | 1–1 (4–5 p) | Prescot Cables (8) | 327 |
| 8 | Morpeth Town (8) | 0–1 | Dunston (8) | 371 |
| 9 | Mickleover (8) | 2–1 | Sutton Coldfield Town (8) | 293 |
| 10 | Loughborough Students (8) | 4–3 | Chasetown (8) | 122 |
| 11 | Nantwich Town (8) | 2–3 | Wellingborough Town (8) | 283 |
| 12 | Matlock Town (8) | 5–1 | Nuneaton Town (8) | 519 |
| 13 | Bourne Town (8) | 3–2 | Hanley Town (8) | 325 |
| 14 | Shifnal Town (8) | 3–0 | Shepshed Dynamo (8) | 108 |
| 15 | Boldmere St Michaels (8) | 1–3 | Bedworth United (8) | 101 |
| 16 | Kidsgrove Athletic (8) | 0–3 | Stafford Rangers (8) | 371 |
| 17 | Newmarket Town (8) | 5–2 | Gorleston (8) | 168 |
| 18 | Ware (8) | 2–0 | AFC Sudbury (8) | 264 |
| 19 | Fakenham Town (8) | 0–2 | Waltham Abbey (8) | 120 |
| 20 | Winslow United (8) | 5–0 | Concord Rangers (8) | 176 |
| 21 | Welwyn Garden City (8) | 2–1 | Walthamstow (8) | 192 |

| Tie | Home team | Score | Away team | Att. |
|---|---|---|---|---|
| 22 | Canvey Island (8) | 3–2 | Cambridge City (8) | 371 |
| 23 | Potters Bar Town (8) | 2–5 | Biggleswade (8) | 145 |
| 24 | Hashtag United (8) | 3–1 | Hertford Town (8) | 194 |
| 25 | Takeley (8) | 2–0 | Aylesbury United (8) | 139 |
| 26 | Erith Town (8) | 2–0 | Eastbourne Town (8) | 81 |
| 27 | Herne Bay (8) | 0–1 | Southall (8) | 310 |
| 28 | Hayes & Yeading United (8) | 3–1 | Peacehaven & Telscombe (8) | 147 |
| 29 | AFC Croydon Athletic (8) | 3–0 | Raynes Park Vale (8) | 118 |
| 30 | Whitstable Town (8) | 0–0 (5–6 p) | Egham Town (8) | 337 |
| 31 | Ascot United (8) | 1–3 | Ashford United (8) | 161 |
| 32 | Deal Town (8) | 3–0 | Sheppey United (8) | 419 |
| 33 | Faversham Town (8) | 6–2 | Horley Town (8) | 290 |
| 34 | Hastings United (8) | 1–1 (6–5 p) | Bognor Regis Town (8) | 675 |
| 35 | Portland United (8) | 0–2 | Thame United (8) | 166 |
| 36 | Bristol Manor Farm (8) | 2–2 (7–8 p) | Moneyfields (8) | 161 |
| 37 | Hartpury (8) | 2–2 (3–4 p) | Weymouth (8) | 462 |
Match was played at Weymouth.
| 38 | Slimbridge (8) | 2–3 | Willand Rovers (8) | 118 |
| 39 | AFC Stoneham (8) | 0–4 | Didcot Town (8) | 107 |
| 40 | Tiverton Town (8) | 3–0 | Larkhall Athletic (8) | 180 |
Sunday 13 September 2026
| 2 | Hallam (8) | 1–1 (5-3 p) | Runcorn Linnets (8) | 394 |

== Third qualifying round ==
The draw for the third qualifying round was made on 14 September 2026.

Number of teams per tier still in competition
| Tier 5 | Tier 6 | Tier 7 | Tier 8 | Total |
|---|---|---|---|---|
| 24 / 24 | 48 / 48 | 88 / 88 | 40 / 176 | 200 / 336 |

| Tie | Home team | Score | Away team | Att. |
Friday 25 September 2026
| 50 | Biggleswade (8) | 1–3 | Three Bridges (7) | 118 |
| 29 | Aveley (7) | 3–1 | Ware (8) | 212 |
Saturday 26 September 2026
| 1 | Warrington Town (7) | 3–5 | Ashton United (7) | 437 |
| 2 | Hyde United (7) | 2–0 | FC United (7) | 1,005 |
| 3 | Workington (7) | 4–2 | Blyth Spartans (8) | 623 |
| 4 | Guisborough Town (8) | 0–1 | Redcar Athletic (7) | 997 |
| 5 | Dunston (8) | 0–2 | Avro (7) | 263 |
| 6 | Bury (7) | 3–3 (6–5 p) | Gainsborough Trinity (7) | 1,933 |
| 7 | Cleethorpes Town (7) | 5–1 | Lancaster City (7) | 206 |
| 8 | Guiseley (7) | 4–2 | Bamber Bridge (7) | 552 |
| 9 | Warrington Rylands (7) | 3–0 | Stockton Town (7) | 153 |
| 10 | Hallam (8) | 1–1 (2–4 p) | Prescot Cables (8) | 699 |
| 11 | Bridlington Town (8) | 3–0 | Whitby Town (7) | 441 |
| 12 | Bootle (8) | 5–0 | Emley (7) | 439 |
| 13 | Curzon Ashton (7) | 3–1 | Stalybridge Celtic (8) | 715 |
| 14 | Alvechurch (7) | 1–2 | Bourne Town (8) | 263 |
| 15 | Rushall Olympic (7) | 1–3 | Stourbridge (7) | 202 |
| 16 | Bedworth United (8) | 0–1 | Redditch United (7) | 270 |
| 17 | Stamford (7) | 1–2 | Loughborough Students (8) | 235 |
| 18 | Worcester City (7) | 0–2 | Leek Town (7) | 334 |
| 19 | Matlock Town (8) | 0–4 | Kettering Town (7) | 628 |
| 20 | Evesham United (7) | 3–1 | Stratford Town (7) | 392 |
| 21 | Ilkeston Town (7) | 1–3 | Anstey Nomads (7) | 405 |
| 22 | Quorn (7) | 4–2 | Leamington (7) | 422 |
| 23 | Peterborough Sports (7) | 1–3 | Banbury United (7) | 228 |
| 24 | Racing Club Warwick (7) | 0–1 | Bromsgrove Sporting (7) | 583 |
| 25 | Gloucester City (7) | 4–0 | Stafford Rangers (8) | 533 |
| 26 | Alfreton Town (7) | 2–1 | Shifnal Town (8) | 229 |
| 27 | Mickleover (8) | 1–0 | Malvern Town (7) | 408 |
| 28 | Halesowen Town (7) | 2–0 | Wellingborough Town (8) | 914 |
| 30 | Cheshunt (7) | 1–1 (4–5 p) | Cray Wanderers (7) | 198 |
| 32 | Leatherhead (7) | 2–2 (6–5 p) | Ramsgate (7) | 583 |
| 33 | Berkhamsted (7) | 3–1 | Chatham Town (7) | 415 |

| Tie | Home team | Score | Away team | Att. |
|---|---|---|---|---|
| 34 | Maldon & Tiptree (7) | 0–2 | Egham Town (8) | 240 |
| 35 | Eastbourne Borough (7) | 4–2 | Welwyn Garden City (8) | 569 |
| 36 | Takeley (8) | 2–0 | Hitchin Town (7) | 244 |
| 37 | Hanwell Town (7) | 2–4 | Enfield Town (7) | 483 |
| 38 | Waltham Abbey (8) | 7–1 | AFC Croydon Athletic (8) | 212 |
| 39 | Newmarket Town (8) | 2–1 | Leighton Town (7) | 229 |
| 40 | Real Bedford (7) | 0–3 | Wingate & Finchley (7) | 311 |
| 41 | Ashford United (8) | 0–0 (5–6 p) | Deal Town (8) | 544 |
| 42 | Stanway Rovers (7) | 0–2 | Faversham Town (8) | 148 |
| 43 | Welling United (7) | 2–2 (4–5 p) | Chertsey Town (7) | 614 |
| 44 | Brentwood Town (7) | 3–3 (2–4 p) | Hashtag United (8) | 587 |
| 45 | Uxbridge (7) | 2–1 | Lewes (7) | 332 |
| 46 | AFC Whyteleafe (7) | 1–4 | Whitehawk (7) | 98 |
| 47 | Burgess Hill Town (7) | 6–2 | Winslow United (8) | 490 |
| 48 | Hanworth Villa (7) | 3–2 | Bishop's Stortford (7) | 323 |
| 49 | Hayes & Yeading United (8) | 1–1 (3–4 p) | Erith Town (8) | 114 |
| 51 | St Albans City (7) | 4–1 | Bury Town (7) | 1,106 |
| 52 | Canvey Island (8) | 0–3 | Needham Market (7) | 322 |
| 53 | Hastings United (8) | 2–1 | Dulwich Hamlet (7) | 1,348 |
| 54 | Leiston (7) | 0–3 | Dartford (7) | 283 |
| 55 | Frome Town (7) | 1–1 (4–2 p) | Willand Rovers (8) | 339 |
| 56 | Plymouth Parkway (7) | 0–3 | Bath City (7) | 400 |
| 57 | Moneyfields (8) | 1–3 | Wimborne Town (7) | 212 |
| 58 | Didcot Town (8) | 1–0 | Bracknell Town (7) | 344 |
| 59 | Havant & Waterlooville (7) | 2–3 | Taunton Town (7) | 347 |
| 60 | Poole Town (7) | 1–0 | Basingstoke Town (7) | 605 |
| 61 | Yate Town (7) | 0–0 (4–5 p) | Sholing (7) | 243 |
| 62 | Chippenham Town (7) | 2–2 (2–4 p) | Weymouth (8) | 487 |
| 63 | Thame United (8) | 1–2 | Chichester City (7) | 112 |
| 64 | Tiverton Town (8) | 1–3 | Gosport Borough (7) | 236 |
Sunday 27 September 2026
| 31 | Southall (8) | 2–2 (3–4 p) | Carshalton Athletic (7) | 152 |

== First round proper ==
Number of teams per tier still in competition
| Tier 5 | Tier 6 | Tier 7 | Tier 8 | Total |
|---|---|---|---|---|
| 24 / 24 | 48 / 48 | 47 / 88 | 17 / 176 | 136 / 336 |

The draw for the first round was made on 28 September 2026.

| Tie | Home team | Score | Away team | Att. |
Saturday 24 October 2026
| 1 | Warrington Rylands (7) | 1–3 | Guiseley (7) | 179 |
| 2 | Bury (7) | 3–0 | Prescot Cables (8) | 1,970 |
| 3 | Workington (7) | P–P | Cleethorpes Town (7) | |
| 4 | Leek Town (7) | 4–1 | Bootle (8) | 345 |
| 5 | Ashton United (7) | 1–0 | Redcar Athletic (7) | 172 |
| 6 | Bridlington Town (8) | 2–2 (4–3 p) | Curzon Ashton (7) | 305 |
| 7 | Avro (7) | 2–1 | Hyde United (7) | 344 |
| 8 | Redditch United (7) | 2–2 (4–2 p) | Gloucester City (7) | 340 |
| 9 | Mickleover (8) | 1–2 | Alfreton Town (7) | 452 |
| 10 | Anstey Nomads (7) | 0–1 | Bromsgrove Sporting (7) | 194 |
| 11 | Evesham United (7) | 0–4 | Halesowen Town (7) | 365 |
| 12 | Loughborough Students (8) | 0–2 | Stourbridge (7) | 531 |
| 13 | Bourne Town (8) | 1–0 | Banbury United (7) | 302 |
| 14 | Kettering Town (7) | 6–2 | Quorn (7) | 525 |
| 15 | Egham Town (8) | 0–3 | Uxbridge (7) | 182 |
| 16 | Erith Town (8) | 3–3 (3–4 p) | Burgess Hill Town (7) | 120 |
| 17 | Leatherhead (7) | 2–2 (1–2 p) | Eastbourne Borough (7) | 442 |

| Tie | Home team | Score | Away team | Att. |
|---|---|---|---|---|
| 18 | Dartford (7) | 3–2 | Three Bridges (7) | 421 |
| 19 | Whitehawk (7) | 3–3 (5–4 p) | St Albans City (7) | 113 |
| 20 | Aveley (7) | 2–1 | Carshalton Athletic (7) | 128 |
| 21 | Enfield Town (7) | 5–1 | Hanworth Villa (7) | 373 |
| 22 | Needham Market (7) | 0–2 | Wingate & Finchley (7) | 212 |
| 23 | Hastings United (8) | 2–3 | Waltham Abbey (8) | 649 |
| 24 | Berkhamsted (7) | 1–2 | Cray Wanderers (7) | 313 |
| 25 | Faversham Town (8) | 0–1 | Newmarket Town (8) | 251 |
| 26 | Deal Town (8) | 1–3 | Hashtag United (8) | 393 |
| 27 | Takeley (8) | 0–4 | Chertsey Town (7) | 239 |
| 28 | Weymouth (8) | 3–2 | Sholing (7) | 517 |
| 29 | Didcot Town (8) | 2–1 | Poole Town (7) | 244 |
| 30 | Taunton Town (7) | 1–4 | Wimborne Town (7) | 360 |
| 31 | Gosport Borough (7) | 0–1 | Chichester City (7) | 143 |
| 32 | Bath City (7) | 0–0 (4–3 p) | Frome Town (7) | 1,126 |
Tuesday 27 October 2026
| 3 | Workington (7) | 3–2 | Cleethorpes Town (7) | 404 |

== Second round proper ==
Number of teams per tier still in competition
| Tier 5 | Tier 6 | Tier 7 | Tier 8 | Total |
|---|---|---|---|---|
| 24 / 24 | 48 / 48 | 25 / 88 | 7 / 176 | 104 / 336 |

The draw for the second round was made on 26 October 2026.

| Tie | Home team | Score | Away team | Att. |
Saturday 14 November 2026
| 1 | Hebburn Town (6) | 2–0 | Guiseley (7) | 451 |
| 2 | Ashton United (7) | 6–2 | Workington (7) | 232 |
| 3 | Bridlington Town (8) | 1–0 | Macclesfield (6) | 833 |
| 4 | Spennymoor Town (6) | 0–0 (4–5 p) | Scarborough Athletic (6) | 685 |
| 5 | Radcliffe (6) | 1–2 | Marine (6) | |
| 6 | Avro (7) | 4–1 | Chester (6) | 532 |
| 7 | Darlington (6) | 4–0 | Bury (7) | 1,717 |
| 8 | Alfreton Town (7) | 0–1 | Southport (6) | 509 |
| 9 | Chorley (6) | 1–2 | Buxton (6) | |
| 10 | Worksop Town (6) | 0–1 | South Shields (6) | 541 |
| 11 | Leek Town (7) | 0–1 | Morecambe (6) | 604 |
| 12 | Bourne Town (8) | 0–2 | Bromsgrove Sporting (7) | 526 |
| 13 | Bedford Town (6) | 1–1 (4–5 p) | Chesham United (6) | 519 |
| 14 | Wingate & Finchley (7) | 2–2 (5–6 p) | Hashtag United (8) | 221 |
| 15 | Braintree Town (6) | 2–3 | Kettering Town (7) | 407 |
| 16 | King's Lynn Town (6) | 1–0 | Stourbridge (7) | 690 |
| 17 | Halesowen Town (7) | 4–0 | Redditch United (7) | 1,256 |
| 18 | AFC Telford United (6) | 1–1 (6–5 p) | Chelmsford City (6) | 1,031 |
| 19 | Hednesford Town (6) | 1–0 | Hemel Hempstead Town (6) | |
| 20 | Hereford (6) | 1–2 | Brackley Town (6) | 1,392 |

| Tie | Home team | Score | Away team | Att. |
|---|---|---|---|---|
| 21 | Newmarket Town (8) | 1–4 | Oxford City (6) | 655 |
| 22 | Merthyr Town (6) | 4–1 | Harborough Town (6) | 479 |
| 23 | Billericay Town (6) | 3–1 | Waltham Abbey (8) | 849 |
| 24 | Enfield Town (7) | 0–0 (3–4 p) | Spalding United (6) | 561 |
| 25 | Dagenham & Redbridge (6) | 1–1 (5–3 p) | Dorking Wanderers (6) | 1,129 |
| 26 | Walton & Hersham (6) | 3–2 | Aveley (7) | 465 |
| 27 | Farnham Town (6) | 1–2 | Ebbsfleet United (6) | 835 |
| 28 | Folkestone Invicta (6) | 1–3 | Cray Wanderers (7) | 655 |
| 29 | Weymouth (8) | 1–0 | Hampton & Richmond Borough (6) | 780 |
| 30 | Dartford (7) | 1–1 (5–4 p) | AFC Totton (6) | 572 |
| 31 | Horsham (6) | 1–0 | Torquay United (6) | 966 |
| 32 | Didcot Town (8) | 0–2 | Slough Town (6) | 661 |
| 33 | Maidstone United (6) | 2–2 (3–5 p) | Maidenhead United (6) | 1,297 |
| 34 | Whitehawk (7) | 0–2 | Tonbridge Angels (6) | 298 |
| 35 | Wimborne Town (7) | 0–0 (3–4 p) | Uxbridge (7) | 627 |
| 36 | Bath City (7) | 0–1 | Truro City (6) | 1,245 |
| 37 | Eastbourne Borough (7) | 2–1 | Chertsey Town (7) | 703 |
| 38 | Dover Athletic (6) | 3–0 | Burgess Hill Town (7) | |
| 39 | Salisbury (6) | 4–0 | Chichester City (7) | 832 |
| 40 | Weston-super-Mare (6) | 0–0 (3–2 p) | Farnborough (6) | 438 |

== Third round proper ==
Number of teams per tier still in competition
| Tier 5 | Tier 6 | Tier 7 | Tier 8 | Total |
|---|---|---|---|---|
| 24 / 24 | 28 / 48 | 9 / 88 | 3 / 176 | 64 / 336 |

The draw for the third round proper was made on 16 November 2026. Teams were split to create 14 ties for the northern section and 18 ties for the southern section.

| Tie | Home team | Score | Away team | Att. |
Saturday 12 December 2026
| 1 (N) | Scunthorpe United (5) | – | Hebburn Town (6) | |
| 2 (N) | Hartlepool United (5) | – | Ashton United (7) | |
| 3 (N) | Carlisle United (5) | – | Southport (6) | |
| 4 (N) | Darlington (6) | – | Harrogate Town (5) | |
| 5 (N) | Morecambe (6) | – | Tamworth (5) | |
| 6 (N) | Altrincham (5) | – | Buxton (6) | |
| 7 (N) | Barrow (5) | – | Avro (7) | |
| 8 (N) | Scarborough Athletic (6) | – | Kettering Town (7) | |
| 9 (N) | Bridlington Town (8) | – | South Shields (6) | |
| 10 (N) | Halesowen Town (7) | – | Hednesford Town (6) | |
| 11 (N) | Gateshead (5) | – | AFC Telford United (6) | |
| 12 (N) | Boston United (5) | – | Marine (6) | |
| 13 (N) | Spalding United (6) | – | King's Lynn Town (6) | |
| 14 (N) | AFC Fylde (5) | – | FC Halifax Town (5) | |

| Tie | Home team | Score | Away team | Att. |
|---|---|---|---|---|
| 1 (S) | Weston-super-Mare (6) | – | Ebbsfleet United (6) | |
| 2 (S) | Chesham United (6) | – | Wealdstone (5) | |
| 3 (S) | Merthyr Town (6) | – | Woking (5) | |
| 4 (S) | Dagenham & Redbridge (6) | – | Sutton United (5) | |
| 5 (S) | Horsham (6) | – | Hashtag United (8) | |
| 6 (S) | Cray Wanderers (7) | – | Maidenhead United (6) | |
| 7 (S) | Truro City (6) | – | Walton & Hersham (6) | |
| 8 (S) | Oxford City (6) | – | Eastbourne Borough (7) | |
| 9 (S) | Slough Town (6) | – | Billericay Town (6) | |
| 10 (S) | Boreham Wood (5) | – | Salisbury (6) | |
| 11 (S) | Southend United (5) | – | Dartford (7) | |
| 12 (S) | Worthing (5) | – | Forest Green Rovers (5) | |
| 13 (S) | Aldershot Town (5) | – | Solihull Moors (5) | |
| 14 (S) | Weymouth (8) | – | Uxbridge (7) | |
| 15 (S) | Eastleigh (5) | – | Bromsgrove Sporting (7) | |
| 16 (S) | Tonbridge Angels (6) | – | Yeovil Town (5) | |
| 17 (S) | Hornchurch (5) | – | Kidderminster Harriers (5) | |
| 18 (S) | Dover Athletic (6) | – | Brackley Town (6) | |
