= Penrith A.F.C. =

Association football club in England

Penrith FC
- Full name: Penrith Football Club
- Nickname: The Bonny Blues
- Founded: 1894
- Ground: Frenchfield Park Stadium, Penrith
- Capacity: 1,500
- Coordinates: 54°39′28″N 2°42′51″W
- Manager: Danny Grainger (interim)
- League: Northern League Division One
- 2025–26: Northern League Division One, 12th of 19
Home colours	Away colours

Penrith Association Football Club are a football club based in Penrith, Cumbria, England.

They play in the Northern League Division One and their home games take place at the Frenchfield Park Stadium.

The club moto is RES-NON-VERBA which is the Latin phrase that translated means "actions speak louder than words" or "deeds not words" and features on the club crest.

The team are also known as "The Bonny Blues" as the home strip features a blue shirt with blue shorts and blue socks; the away colours are a yellow shirt with yellow shorts and socks.

== History ==
Founded in 1894.[1] They originally joined the North Eastern League in 1907–08 and are currently members of the Northern Football League Division One.

The club joined the Northern Football League in 1947 and were runners up to Stanley United in the 1961-62 season.

Penrith have had many managers over the years with Alan Ashman being the most famous, Ashman left the club in February 1963 to join Carlisle United followed by West Bromwich Albion, where he won the FA Cup in 1968 beating Everton FC in the Final played at Wembley Stadium.

The team spent 35 years in the Northern Football League until moving to the North West Counties Football League for the 1982-83 season.

A five-season spell in the North West Counties Football League (including finishing as league runners-up to Stalybridge Celtic in the 1983-84 season) saw them in a position to join the Northern Premier League when they expanded to form a Second Division in 1987.

The move to the Northern Premier League did not prove successful, and by 1990 they were relegated back to the North West Counties League, where they stayed for seven seasons before returning once more to the Northern Football League, fifteen years after originally leaving that league.

In 1981–82, they had their best FA Cup run, reaching the Second Round, beating Football League club Chester City FC 1-0 at their Southend Road ground in the First Round before losing 3-0 at Belle Vue against Doncaster Rovers who at the time were managed by former Leeds United and Scotland captain Billy Bremner.

The club have reached the FA Cup First Round twice since beating Chester City, only to lose 2-0 against Hull City in 1983 and 9-0 to Burnley FC in 1984, both ties being played at Southend Road.

The 2002-03 season saw the club winning the Northern Football League Division Two Championship, finishing three points ahead of nearest rivals Horden Colliery Welfare.

In 2007, they changed their name to Penrith Town, but a merger a year later with Northern Football Alliance club Penrith United saw the old name resurrected for the merged club, since then the club have continued to play in The Northern Football League.

In 2008 the club saw its ground at Southend Road earmarked for development with a new stadium built at Frenchfield Park, the first home game at the club's new home being played on 4 August 2009.

Penrith’s most recent success being in the 2009-10 season when beating Carlisle based team Gillford Park FC 6-0 in the Cumberland Senior Cup Final.

The club have reached the Third Round of the FA Vase on five occasions the most recent being in 2016-17 when losing 3-0 to Atherton Collieries at the Frenchfield Park Stadium.

In October 2021 the club announced the appointment of former Jamaica international Chris Humphrey as manager at Frenchfield Park, Humphrey had a successful playing career at Hibernian FC and Motherwell FC in Scotland as well as Shrewsbury Town and Preston North End in England.

In May 2022 the club appointed former Carlisle United player Darren Edmondson as manager, Edmondson had a distinguished Football League career making 214 appearances and scoring 8 goals for the Cumbrian club.

Following Edmondson's departure in May 2025 to join Workington AFC, Penrith announced the re-appointment of Jim Nichols for a second spell as first team manager, eight years after leaving the club at the end of the 2016-17 season.

Since moving to the Frenchfield Park Stadium the club has carried out significant improvements to the facilities and in June 2023 work began to create a new 3G artificial pitch making it a very modern and picturesque stadium.

The current capacity of Frenchfield Park Stadium is around 1,500 and has room for future expansion should the club ever require it.

== Senior Coaching Staff ==
As of 8 October 2026

Position	Name
Interim First Team Manager	Danny Grainger
Assistant First Team Manager	Richard Prokas
First Team Goalkeeper Coach	Jordan Carrigan
Physiotherapist	Natalie Broad
Reserve Team Manager	Mark Bell
Academy Manager	Wayne Rebanks
Ladies Team Manager	Jamie Fitzwilliam
Ladies Development Manager	Simon Savage

== Current Squad ==
As of 01 May 2025

Note: Flags indicate national team as defined under FIFA eligibility rules; some limited exceptions apply. Players may hold more than one non-FIFA nationality.

No.	Pos.	Nation	Player
—	GK	ENG	Craig Hunter
—	GK	ENG	Aaran Taylor
—	DF	ENG	Matthew Bell
—	DF	ENG	Matthew Coombe
—	DF	ENG	Ronan Irving
—	DF	ENG	Kevin McKenna
—	DF	ENG	Andrew Murray-Jones
—	DF	ENG	Jack Piele
—	MF	ENG	James Bell
—	MF	ENG	Luke Brown
—	MF	ENG	Kingsley Grandison

No.	Pos.	Nation	Player
—	MF	ENG	Connor Hammell
—	MF	ENG	Robbie Hebson
—	MF	ENG	Luke Hunter
—	MF	ENG	Luke Moore
—	MF	ENG	Will Morrey
—	MF	ENG	Matthew Moynan (captain)
—	MF	ENG	Matthew Story
—	MF	ENG	Oliver Rafferty
—	FW	ENG	Jonny Murray
—	FW	ENG	D J Taylor
—	FW	ENG	Matthew Williamson

== Season-by-Season ==
Season	League	Division	Pos	Played	Won	Drew	Lost	GF	GA	GD	Points	FA Cup	FA Vase
2014/15	Northern Football League	Division One	14th	42	15	11	16	68	74	-6	56	Extra Preliminary Round, losing to Newcastle Benfield	First Qualifying Round, losing to Colne
2015/16	Northern Football League	Division One	14th	42	14	10	18	67	75	-8	52	Extra Preliminary Round, losing to Jarrow Roofing Boldon	First Qualifying Round, losing to Bridlington Town
2016/17	Northern Football League	Division One	12th	42	17	6	19	67	89	-22	57	Preliminary Round, losing to Dunston UTS	Third Round, losing to Atherton Collieries
2017/18	Northern Football League	Division One	17th	42	15	3	24	71	85	-14	48	Preliminary Round, losing to Whitley Bay	Second Qualifying Round, losing to Tow Law Town
2018/19	Northern Football League	Division One	18th	34	5	7	22	39	100	-61	22	Extra Preliminary Round, losing to Albion Sports	Second Qualifying Round, losing to Charnock Richard
2019/20	Northern Football League	Division One	†	29	5	5	19	32	69	-37	20	Extra Preliminary Round, losing to Seaham Red Star	First Qualifying Round, losing to Guisborough Town
2020/21	Northern Football League	Division One	†	11	3	0	8	15	34	-19	9	Preliminary Round, losing to West Allotment Celtic	First Round, losing to Sunderland Ryhope Colliery Welfare
2021/22	Northern Football League	Division One	19th	38	10	5	23	47	89	-42	35	Extra Preliminary Round, losing to Guisborough Town	First Round, losing to Prestwich Heys
2022/23	Northern Football League	Division One	14th	38	11	8	19	45	64	-19	41	Extra Preliminary Round, losing to West Allotment Celtic	First Qualifying Round, losing to Horden Community Welfare
2023/24	Northern Football League	Division One	15th	38	13	2	23	82	89	-7	41	Preliminary Round, losing to Consett	Second Qualifying Round, losing to Ryton & Crawcrook Albion
2024/25	Northern Football League	Division One	17th	42	15	3	24	57	76	-19	48	Preliminary Round, losing to Crook Town	Second Qualifying Round, losing to Padiham
2025/26	Northern Football League	Division One	12th	36	11	9	16	69	67	+2	42	Extra Preliminary Round, losing to Pickering Town	First Qualifying Round, losing to Campion

† Season curtailed due to coronavirus pandemic.

== Recent Previous Managers ==
2002-2008	David Heslop
2008-2012	Richard Prokas & James Tose
2012-2012	Brian Williams
2012-2016	Matthew Henney
2016-2017	Jim Nichols
2017-2018	Kyle May
2018-2019	Andrew Coyles
2019-2021	David Hewson
2021-2022	Chris Humphrey
2022-2025	Darren Edmondson
2025-2026	Jim Nichols

== Honours ==
Penrith's honours
Competition		Position	Season
Northern League	Division One	Runners-up	1961–62
Northern League	Division Two	Champions	2002–03
North West Counties League	Premier Division	Runners-up	1983–84
Cumberland Senior Cup		Champions	2000–01, 2005–06, 2009–10
Cumberland Senior Cup		Runners-up	1991–92, 1994–95, 2003–04, 2007–08, 2008–09, 2016–17, 2017–18, 2018–19, 2022–23

== Records ==
- FA Cup
  - Second Round 1981–82
- FA Trophy
  - First Round 1980–81, 1982–83
- FA Vase
  - Third Round 1991–92, 1993–94, 2008–09, 2009–10, 2016–17
