= 1956–57 Northern Football League =

The 1956–57 Northern Football League season was the 59th in the history of the Northern Football League, a football competition in Northern England.

== Clubs ==
Northern League
- Season: 1956–57
- Champions: Billingham Synthonia
- Matches: 182
- Goals: 816 (4.48 per match)

The league featured 14 clubs which competed in the last season, no new clubs joined the league this season.

=== League table ===
Pos	Team	Pld	W	D	L	GF	GA	GR	Pts
1	Billingham Synthonia	26	20	2	4	66	37	1.784	42
2	West Auckland Town	26	16	2	8	79	52	1.519	34
3	Bishop Auckland	26	13	7	6	76	48	1.583	33
4	Ferryhill Athletic	26	14	4	8	63	48	1.313	32
5	Willington	26	13	6	7	60	48	1.250	32
6	Crook Town	26	13	5	8	67	62	1.081	31
7	Durham City	26	12	5	9	58	50	1.160	29
8	Shildon	26	11	3	12	60	56	1.071	25
9	Stanley United	26	9	6	11	48	54	0.889	24
10	Evenwood Town	26	8	5	13	58	78	0.744	21
11	Penrith	26	8	3	15	41	65	0.631	19
12	South Bank	26	8	2	16	49	57	0.860	18
13	Whitby Town	26	5	4	17	54	84	0.643	14
14	Tow Law Town	26	3	4	19	37	77	0.481	10

Rules for classification: 1) points; 2) goal ratio.
