= 2017–18 Northern Football League =

The 2017–18 season was the 120th in the history of Northern Football League, a football competition in England. The league has operated two divisions in the English football league system, Division One at step 5, and Division Two at step 6.

The constitution for Step 5 and Step 6 divisions for 2017–18 was announced on 26 May 2017, and fixtures were released on 3 June 2017.

== Division One ==
Northern Football League Division One
- Season: 2017–18
- Champions: Marske United
- Promoted: Marske United; Morpeth Town
- Relegated: Billingham Synthonia; Washington
- Matches: 462
- Goals: 1,727 (3.74 per match)

Division One featured 19 clubs which competed in the division last season, along with three new clubs, promoted from Division Two:

- Billingham Synthonia
- Stockton Town
- Team Northumbria

=== Division One table ===
Pos	Team	Pld	W	D	L	GF	GA	GD	Pts	Promotion or relegation
1	Marske United	42	32	6	4	102	31	+71	102	Promoted to the Northern Premier League (Note: 12 of the 14 runners-up at Step 5 were to have been promoted to Step 4. However, with resignations and mergers in leagues above, all fourteen runners-up were promoted.)
2	Morpeth Town	42	30	7	5	117	52	+65	97	Promoted to the Northern Premier League
3	Shildon	42	24	8	10	93	55	+38	80	
4	Sunderland RCA	42	24	7	11	96	54	+42	79	
5	West Auckland Town	42	23	9	10	107	64	+43	78	
6	Stockton Town	42	23	2	17	91	72	+19	71	
7	Newcastle Benfield	42	22	5	15	90	71	+19	71	
8	North Shields	42	21	6	15	103	73	+30	69	
9	Consett	42	21	5	16	93	83	+10	68	
10	Dunston UTS	42	19	6	17	77	68	+9	63	
11	Ryhope Colliery Welfare	42	19	3	20	85	87	−2	60	
12	Ashington	42	16	11	15	80	67	+13	59	
13	Team Northumbria	42	17	5	20	64	70	−6	56	Resigned from the league
14	Newton Aycliffe	42	13	13	16	53	58	−5	52	
15	Guisborough Town	42	15	10	17	70	82	−12	52 (Note: Guisborough Town were deducted three points for fielding a player while under suspension.)	
16	Whitley Bay	42	15	6	21	73	91	−18	51	
17	Penrith	42	15	3	24	71	85	−14	48	
18	Seaham Red Star	42	12	7	23	57	90	−33	43	
19	Bishop Auckland	42	13	4	25	68	112	−44	43	
20	Jarrow Roofing BCA	42	11	6	25	70	102	−32	39	Resigned from the league
21	Washington	42	4	6	32	39	132	−93	18	Relegated to Division Two
22	Billingham Synthonia	42	2	7	33	28	128	−100	13	Relegated to Division Two

Source: fchd
Rules for classification: 1) Points; 2) Goal difference; 3) Number of goals scored; 4) Number of matches won; 5) Head-to-head results

== Division Two ==
Northern Football League Division Two
- Season: 2017–18
- Champions: Blyth
- Promoted: Blyth; Hebburn Town; Whickham
- Relegated: Alnwick Town; Darlington Railway Athletic
- Matches: 420
- Goals: 1,495 (3.56 per match)

Division Two featured 18 clubs which competed in the division last season, along with three new clubs:

- Chester-le-Street Town, relegated from Division One
- Jarrow, promoted from the Wearside League
- West Allotment Celtic, relegated from Division One

Also, Blyth Town changed name to Blyth.

=== Division Two table ===
Pos	Team	Pld	W	D	L	GF	GA	GD	Pts	Promotion or relegation
1	Blyth	40	26	8	6	95	39	+56	86	Promoted to Division One
2	Hebburn Town	40	24	9	7	85	37	+48	81	Promoted to Division One
3	Whickham	40	25	5	10	80	52	+28	80	Promoted to Division One
4	Northallerton Town	40	25	4	11	99	64	+35	79	
5	Heaton Stannington	40	21	9	10	86	57	+29	72	
6	Thornaby	40	21	5	14	85	53	+32	68	
7	Willington	40	20	7	13	65	49	+16	67	
8	Tow Law Town	40	19	7	14	88	70	+18	64	
9	Billingham Town	40	17	10	13	81	60	+21	61	
10	Easington Colliery	40	16	9	15	78	75	+3	57	
11	Durham City	40	14	9	17	73	79	−6	51	
12	Jarrow	40	13	11	16	56	69	−13	50	
13	Esh Winning	40	14	8	18	76	90	−14	50	
14	Chester-le-Street Town	40	13	10	17	58	71	−13	49	
15	West Allotment Celtic	40	13	6	21	64	86	−22	45	
16	Bedlington Terriers	40	14	5	21	63	70	−7	44 (Note: Bedlington Terriers were deducted three points for fielding a player registered after the deadline.)	
17	Ryton & Crawcrook Albion	40	12	8	20	53	76	−23	44	
18	Crook Town	40	12	6	22	62	104	−42	42	
19	Brandon United	40	8	9	23	56	88	−32	33	
20	Darlington Railway Athletic	40	9	4	27	41	90	−49	31	Relegated to the Wearside League
21	Alnwick Town	40	6	7	27	51	116	−65	25	Relegated to the Northern Football Alliance

Source: fchd
Rules for classification: 1) Points; 2) Goal difference; 3) Number of goals scored; 4) Number of matches won; 5) Head-to-head results
