= Northallerton Town F.C. =

Association football club in England

Coordinates: 54°19′39.86″N 1°27′14.44″W

Northallerton Town
- Full name: Northallerton Town Football Club
- Nicknames: Town, The Ally
- Founded: 1895
- Ground: Calvert Stadium, Northallerton
- Chairman: Jason Bleanch
- Manager: Jamie Poole
- League: Northern League Division One
- 2025–26: Northern League Division One, 19th of 19
| Home colours | Away colours |

Northallerton Town Football Club is a football club based in Northallerton, North Yorkshire, England. They are currently members of the Northern League Division One and play at the Calvert Stadium.

== History ==
The club was founded in 1895. They originally played in the Allertonshire League, before moving onto the Vale of Mowbray League and the Ripon & District League, before then becoming members of the Teesside League in 1972. However, they left the Teesside League in 1974, transferring to the North Yorkshire League. The club later joined the Darlington & District League and then the Harrogate & District League. In 1982 they moved up to the newly-formed Division Two of the Northern League. After finishing as runners-up in Division Two in 1989–90, the club were promoted to Division One. In 1993–94 they won the Northern League Cup.

Northallerton Town folded during the summer of 1994 and were reformed as Northallerton Football Club. The 1994–95 season saw them finish second-from-bottom of Division One, resulting in relegation to Division Two. However, they were Division Two champions in 1996–97 and were promoted back to Division One. In 1998 the club reverted to their previous name after being relegated back to Division Two at the end of the 1997–98 season. The club were Division Two runners-up in 2005–06, resulting in promotion to Division One. In 2008–09 they finished bottom of Division One and were relegated back to Division Two. The club won the league's Ernest Armstrong Memorial Cup in 2011–12, and went on to win the trophy again in 2015–16, 2016–17 and 2018–19.

In 2018–19 Northallerton finished third in Division Two and were promoted to Division One. They finished second-from-bottom of Division One in 2025–26, but were reprieved from relegation.

== Ground ==
The club played at the Bluestone Ground until 1974 when it was compulsorily purchased by North Yorkshire County Council. The council provided the club with a new ground on Ainderby Road, which was later renamed the Calvert Stadium. In the early 1990s a 150-seat stand and a covered terrace with a capacity of 400 were built, with terracing also installed behind both goals.

In 2019 the club signed a 25-year lease on the ground, allowing them to invest in new facilities and floodlighting.

== Honours ==
- Northern League
  - Division Two champions 1996–97
  - Ernest Armstrong Memorial Cup winners 2011–12, 2015–16, 2016–17, 2018–19

== Records ==
- Best FA Cup performance: Fourth qualifying round, 1992–93, 1993–94
- Best FA Trophy performance: Third round, 1992–93
- Best FA Vase performance: Fourth round, 2002–03
- Record attendance: 710 vs Darlington 1883, friendly match, 16 July 2012

== See also ==
- Northallerton Town F.C. players
- Northallerton Town F.C. managers
