= Chester-le-Street Town F.C. =

Association football club in County Durham, England

Coordinates: 54°50′09.2″N 1°35′12.5″W

Chester-le-Street Town
- Full name: Chester-le-Street Town Football Club
- Nickname: The Cestrians
- Founded: 1972
- Ground: Moor Park, Chester-le-Street
- Chairman: Joe Burlison
- Manager: Lee Haldane
- League: Northern League Division Two
- 2024–25: Northern League Division Two, 16th of 22
Home colours	Away colours

Chester-le-Street Town Football Club is a football club based in Chester-le-Street, County Durham, England. They are currently members of the Northern League Division Two and play at Moor Park.

== History ==
The original Chester-le-Street Town joined the North Eastern League in 1920. The league gained a second division in 1926, and the club were relegated to Division Two at the end of the 1926–27 season. They finished bottom of Division Two in 1929–30 and 1930–31, and again in 1932–33. After finishing bottom of Division Two for a fourth time in 1934–35, the club transferred to the Wearside League. However, they spent only one season in the Wearside League, leaving after finishing bottom of the table.

The modern club was founded in 1972 as Chester-le-Street Garden Farm, named after the pub in which it was founded. They initially played in the Newcastle City Amateur League, before moving to the Washington League in 1974, and then joining the Wearside League in 1977. In 1978 the club adopted its current name. They won the Wearside League in 1980–81, and after finishing as runners-up in 1982–83, they moved up to Division Two of the Northern League. The club won Division Two at the first attempt, earning promotion to Division One.

Chester-le-Street were relegated back to Division Two at the end of the 1988–89 season, but returned to Division One after finishing third in Division Two in 1991–92. Another relegation in 1996–97 was followed by winning the Division Two title, making an immediate return to Division One. They were relegated again at the end of the 2009–10. After finishing third in Division Two in 2015–16 the club were promoted back to Division One. However, they were relegated back to Division Two at the end of the following season after finishing second-from-bottom in Division One. In 2017–18 the club won the league's Ernest Armstrong Cup, beating Ryton & Crawcrook Albion 2–0 in the final.

== Ground ==
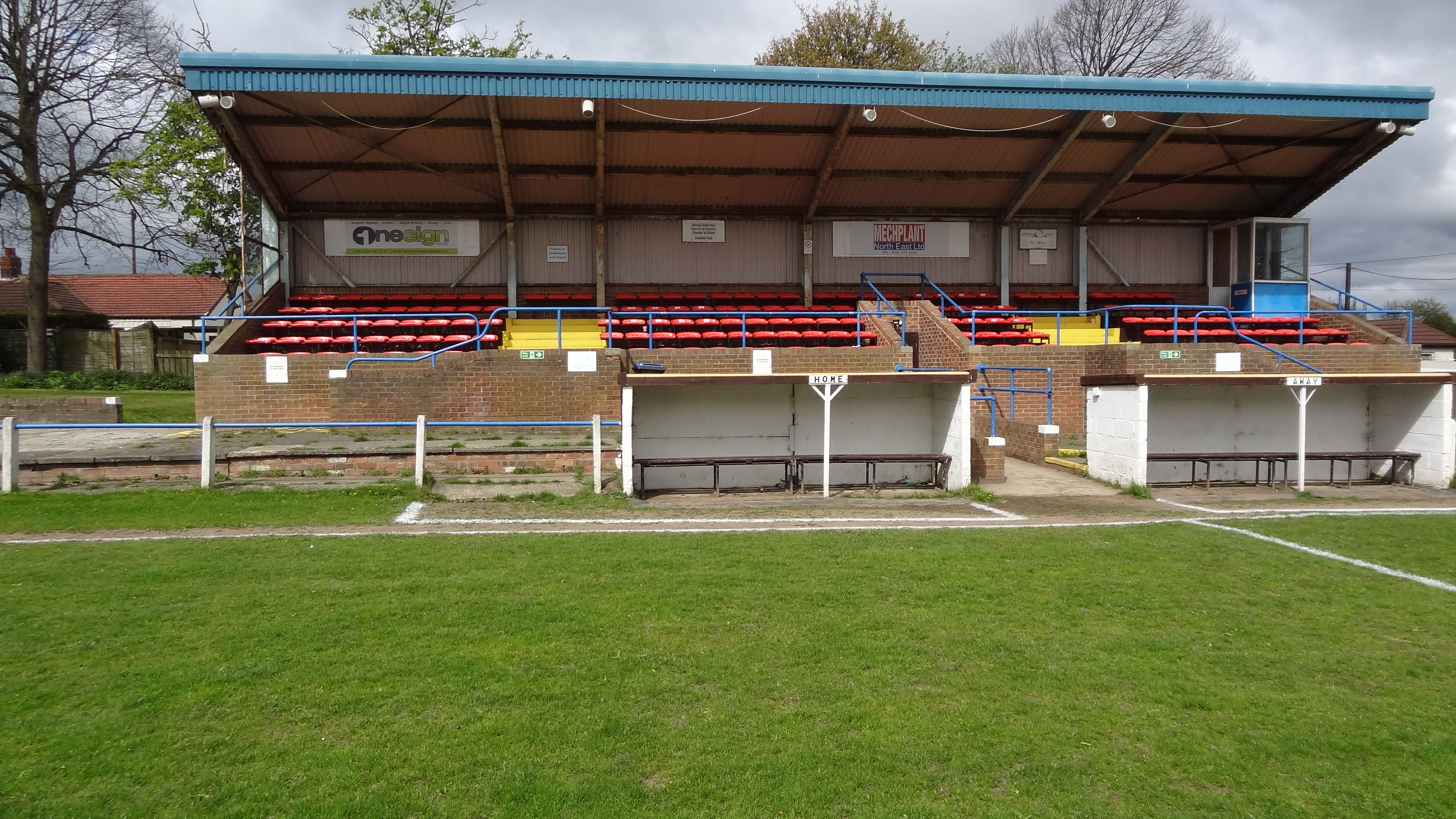
Main Stand at Moor Park

The modern club initially played at Low Fell in nearby Gateshead as they were unable to find anywhere to play in Chester-le-Street. Between 1973 and 1977 they played at the Riverside in Chester-le-Street, before moving to the Sacriston Colliery Welfare ground and then to their current Moor Park ground in 1978. The ground includes a 200-seat stand and a 500-capacity covered terrace.

== Honours ==
- Northern League
  - Division Two champions 1983–84, 1997–98
  - Ernest Armstrong Cup winners 2017–18
- Wearside League
  - Champions 1980–81
- Monkwearmouth Cup
  - Winners 1980–81, 1981–82

== Records ==
- Best FA Cup performance: Fourth qualifying round, 1986–87
- Best FA Trophy performance: Second qualifying round, 1985–86, 1993–94
- Best FA Vase performance: Fifth round, 1984–85

== See also ==
- Chester-le-Street Town F.C. players
- Chester-le-Street Town F.C. managers
