= Blyth Town F.C. =

Coordinates: 55°6′20.86″N 1°31′9.9″W

Blyth Town
- Full name: Blyth Town Football Club
- Nickname: Town
- Founded: 1995
- Ground: South Newsham Playing Fields, Blyth
- Chairman: Scott Douglas
- Manager: Mick Connor
- League: Northern League Division One
- 2025–26: Northern Premier League Division One East, 20th of 22 (relegated)
Home colours	Away colours

Blyth Town Football Club is a football club based in Blyth, Northumberland, England. They are currently members of Northern League Division One, the eighth tier of English football, and play at the South Newsham Playing Fields.

== History ==
The original Blyth Town was established in 1995 as a junior club, initially having three boys teams. They gradually expanded to more age groups, and added both men's and women's adult teams in 2002, with the men's team entering Division Two of the Northern Alliance. The club won Division Two at the first attempt, earning promotion to Division One. In 2004–05 they finished as Division One runners-up and were promoted to the Premier Division. The club were Premier Division champions in 2013–14, and the following season saw them win the treble of the Premier Division, Challenge Cup and George Dobbins League Cup.

In 2015, the first team broke away from the main club to become a separate organisation. After winning the Premier Division and Challenge Cup again in 2015–16, they were promoted to Division Two of the Northern League. In 2017 the breakaway club was renamed Blyth AFC. The 2017–18 season saw them win the Division Two title, earning promotion to Division One. Despite winning their first four league games of the 2018–19 season, the club resigned from the league and folded on 28 August 2018 due to a lack of support and permanent home ground.

After the breakaway club was renamed Blyth AFC, the original Blyth Town were admitted to Division Two of the Northern Alliance for the 2017–18 season. After a fifth-place finish in their first season, they were promoted to Division One. The following season saw them win the Division One title, resulting in promotion to the Premier Division. In 2020–21 the club were promoted to Division Two of the Northern League. They entered the FA Vase for the first time in 2021–22. The 2023–24 season saw the club win Division Two of the Northern League, earning promotion to Division One. In 2024–25 they finished fifth in Division One, before going on to beat Shildon 2–1 in the play-off semi-finals and then defeat Newcastle Blue Star on penalties in the final to secure promotion to Division One East of the Northern Premier League.

The following season saw Blyth finish third-from-bottom of Division One East, resulting in relegation back to Division One of the Northern League.

== Ground ==
The club originally played at the South Newsham Playing Fields. They applied for permission to build a 150-seat stand and install floodlights in 2014, but the application was rejected by local councillors. However, the rejection was overturned after the club appealed. In February 2018 the breakaway club moved to Woodhorn Lane in Ashington due to issues with the pitch at South Newsham Playing Fields. The original club remained at South Newsham Playing Fields.

== Honours ==
=== Blyth Town ===
- Northern League
  - Division Two champions 2023–24
- Northern Alliance
  - Premier Division champions 2013–14, 2014–15
  - Division One champions 2018–19
  - Division Two champions 2002–03
  - Challenge Cup winners 2014–15
  - George Dobbins League Cup winners 2014–15

=== Blyth AFC ===
- Northern League
  - Division Two champions 2017–18
- Northern Alliance
  - Premier Division champions 2015–16
  - Challenge Cup winners 2015–16

== Records ==
- Best FA Cup performance: Preliminary round, 2018–19
- Best FA Trophy performance: First qualifying round, 2025–26
- Best FA Vase performance: Fourth round, 2023–24
- Record attendance: 1,105 vs Blyth Spartans, Northumberland Senior Cup semi-final, 2016–17
- Most goals: Gary Day, 34
