= Billingham Synthonia F.C. =

Association football club in England

Coordinates: 54.5705°N 1.3396°W

Billingham Synthonia
- Full name: Billingham Synthonia Football Club
- Nickname: The Synners
- Founded: 1923
- Ground: Bishopton Road West, Stockton-on-Tees
- Chairman: Paul Dolan
- Manager: Ross James
- League: Northern League Division Two
- 2025–26: Northern League Division Two, 19th of 22
- Website: synners.co.uk
Home colours	Away colours

Billingham Synthonia Football Club is a football club based in Stockton-on-Tees, England. Nicknamed the "Synners", they are currently members of the Northern League Division Two and play at Bishopton Road West in Stockton-on-Tees.

== History ==
The club was established in 1923 and was named after an agricultural fertiliser, Synthonia being a contraction of "synthetic ammonia", a product manufactured by ICI, with which the club was affiliated. They initially played in the South Bank & District League, later joining the Teesside League. They won the Teesside League Cup in 1934–35, the league title in 1936–37 and the League Cup for a second time in 1938–39.

In 1945 the club joined the Northern League. They reached the first round of the FA Cup for the first time in 1948–49, losing 5–0 to Crewe Alexandra at Gresty Road. The following season saw them finish as Northern League runners-up and reach the first round of the FA Cup again, this time losing 3–0 at Stockport County. After finishing as runners-up again in 1950–51, a season in which they did not concede a goal during their home league matches, the 1951–52 season saw them win the League Cup with a 1–0 win over Tow Law Town in a replay, finish as runners-up for the third consecutive season and reach the FA Cup first round for a third time, losing 5–0 at Scunthorpe & Lindsey United. They won the Northern League for the first time in 1956–57, a season which also saw another FA Cup first round appearance, resulting in a 6–1 defeat at Carlisle United. The following season they reached the first round again, losing 5–2 at Boston United.

In 1985–86 the club were relegated to Division Two after finishing second-from-bottom of Division One. However, they made an immediate return to Division One by winning Division Two at the first attempt. The 1987–88 season saw a second League Cup win with a 2–1 defeat of Shildon in the final, as well as another FA Cup first round appearance – a 4–2 loss to Halifax Town in a home match played at Hartlepool United's Victoria Park. They went on to win back-to-back Division One titles in 1988–89 and 1989–90; The 1989–90 season also saw a third League Cup win, beating Whitby Town 5–2 in the final, as well as a seventh appearance in the FA Cup first round, this time losing 1–0 at Lincoln City.

A fourth Northern League title was won in 1995–96. In 2006–07 Billingham reached the semi-finals of the FA Vase; after beating AFC Totton 2–1 away from home, they lost the home leg 2–1, with Totton winning the penalty shootout 5–4. At the end of the 2014–15 season they were relegated to Division Two after finishing in the Division One relegation zone. A third-place finish in 2016–17 saw them promoted back to Division One. However, in 2017–18 the club finished bottom of Division One and were relegated back to Division Two.

== Ground ==
The club initially played at Belasis Lane, which was part of the ICI sports complex. The first ground was on the south side of the road, with the club moving to one on the north side of the road prior to joining the Northern League in 1945. The Belasis Lane ground saw the first floodlit game in northern England on 11 November 1952 when Billingham defeated an RAF team 8–4 in front of a crowd of 3,000. In 1958 they moved to Central Avenue; the new ground was opened on 6 September 1958 by Lord Derby, with the first game ending in a 2–2 draw against Bishop Auckland; the crowd of 4,200 remains the club's record attendance. In the same year, the stadium was used for an England 'B' international athletics meeting; the stadium's 2,000 capacity cantilever stand was the longest in the country at the time. Central Avenue was also used by the Billingham Athletics club and hosted Middlesbrough reserve matches until 2011

In April 2017 the club left Central Avenue due to the cost of upgrading works, initially agreeing to use the Norton Sports Complex in Norton for two seasons, which was later extended until 2022. In April 2022 the club announced that home matches in 2022–23 would be played at Stokesley Sports Club. They relocated to Stockton Town's Bishopton Road West ground in 2024.

== Honours ==
- Northern League
  - Division One champions 1956–57, 1988–89, 1989–90, 1995–96
  - Division Two champions 1986–87
  - League Cup winners 1951–52, 1987–88, 1989–90
- Teesside League
  - Champions 1936–37
  - League Cup winners 1934–35, 1938–39
- Durham Challenge Cup
  - Winners 1988–89, 1990–91, 2008–09, 2009–10
- North Riding Senior Cup
  - Winners 1966–67, 1971–72, 1978–79

== Records ==
- Best FA Cup performance: First round, 1948–49, 1949–50, 1951–52, 1956–57, 1957–58, 1987–88, 1989–90
- Best FA Amateur Cup performance: Quarter-finals, 1948–49
- Best FA Trophy performance: Quarter-finals, 1993–94
- Best FA Vase performance: Semi-finals, 2006–07
- Biggest victory: 12–0 vs Brandon United, Northern League Division Two, 4 November 2023
- Most appearances: Andy Harbron, 648 (1977–1996)
- Most goals: Tony Hetherington, 243 (1964–1979)
  - Most goals in one match: Arthur Rhodes, 8 vs South Bank, 25 December 1945
- Record attendance: 4,200 vs Bishop Auckland, 6 September 1958

== See also ==
- Billingham Synthonia F.C. players
- Billingham Synthonia F.C. managers
