= Morpeth Town A.F.C. =

Association football club in England

Coordinates: 55°09′22″N 1°42′31″W

Morpeth Town
- Full name: Morpeth Town Association Football Club
- Nickname: The Highwaymen
- Founded: 1909
- Ground: Craik Park, Morpeth
- Capacity: 2,100 (200 seated)
- Chairman: Ken Beattie
- Manager: Craig Lynch
- League: Northern Premier League Division One East
- 2025–26: Northern Premier League Premier Division, 20th of 21 (relegated)
- Website: morpethtownfc.com
| Home colours | Away colours |

Morpeth Town Association Football Club is a football club based in Morpeth, Northumberland, England. They are currently members of the Northern Premier League Division One East and play at Craik Park.

== History ==
The club was established in 1909. They joined the Northern Alliance in 1936 and were runners-up in 1937–38, before winning the league's Challenge Cup in 1938–39. During the 1939–40 season, which saw the league reorganised into a wartime competition, the club were runners-up in the North Division and then finished third in the combined competition. After the league resumed following the war, Morpeth finished bottom of the Northern Alliance in 1949–50, 1951–52 and 1953–54. They were subsequently runners-up in 1965–66, 1973–74 and 1981–82, as well as winning the Northumberland Benevolent Bowl in 1978–79.

In 1983–84 Morpeth were Northern Alliance champions. They were runners-up the following season and then won both the Challenge Cup and the Northumberland Benevolent Bowl in 1985–86. After winning the league's Subsidiary Cup in 1986–87, the club were champions again in 1993–94, earning promotion to Division Two of the Northern League. They won the division in their second season in the league and were promoted to Division One. The club won the Northumberland Senior Cup in 2006–07, beating Blyth Spartans 3–2 in the final. They finished second from bottom of Division One in 2009–10 and were relegated to Division Two. The following season saw them finish bottom of Division Two, although the club avoided being relegated back to the Northern Alliance. In 2012–13 they finished third in Division Two and were promoted back to Division One.

The 2015–16 season saw Morpeth reach the final of the FA Vase at Wembley Stadium, where they defeated Hereford 4–1 to win the competition. The club went on to finish as runners-up in Division One of the Northern League the following season, also winning the Cleator Cup. After finishing as runners-up again in 2017–18, they were promoted to Division One East of the Northern Premier League. The following season saw them win Division One East, earning promotion to the Premier Division. They also won the Northumberland Senior Cup for the second time, defeating North Shields 2–1 in the final after extra time. The club won the Senior Cup again in 2022–23, beating Blyth Spartans 2–0 in the final.

In 2025–26 Morpeth finished second-from-bottom of the Premier Division and were relegated back to Division One East.

== Ground ==
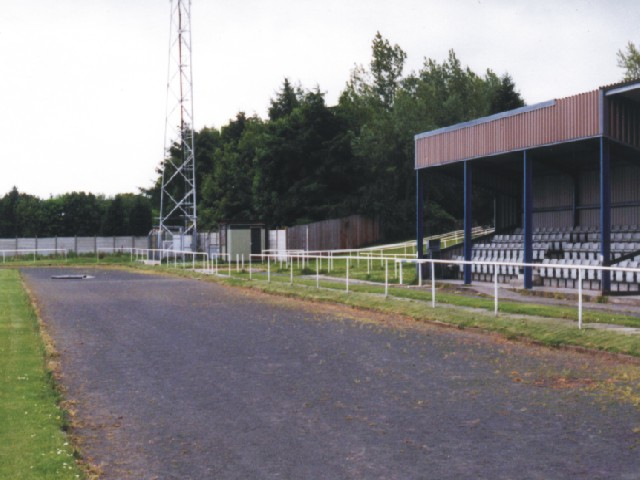
Craik Park

The club initially played at Stobhill Cricket Field, before moving to Storey Park in 1954. In 1994 they relocated to Craik Park, named for W and R Craik, who had been the club's secretaries between 1920 and 1985. Craik Park had been built in 1972 as an athletics venue with a 6-lane cinder track, which was used for training by Morpeth Harriers & AC. After the football club moved to the ground, they built a 100-seat stand and a new clubhouses, as well as erecting floodlights.

Over time the cinder running track has been removed. In 2021 the club installed an artificial grass pitch.

== Honours ==
- FA Vase
  - Winners 2015–16
- Northern Premier League
  - Division One East champions 2018–19
- Northern League
  - Division Two champions 1995–96
  - Cleator Cup winners 2016–17
- Northern Alliance
  - Champions 1983–84, 1993–94
  - Challenge Cup winners 1938–39, 1985–86, 1993–94
  - Subsidiary Cup winners 1986–87
- Northumberland Senior Cup
  - Winners 2006–07, 2018–19, 2022–23
- Northumberland Benevolent Bowl
  - Winners 1978–79, 1985–86

== Records ==
- Best FA Cup performance: Fourth qualifying round, 1998–99, 2021–22
- Best FA Trophy performance: Fifth round, 2021–22
- Best FA Vase performance: Winners, 2015–16

== See also ==
- Morpeth Town A.F.C. players
- Morpeth Town A.F.C. managers
