= Redcar Athletic F.C. =

Association football club in England

Coordinates: 54°36′10.1″N 1°02′19.9″W

Redcar Athletic
- Full name: Redcar Athletic Football Club
- Nickname: The Steelmen
- Founded: 1993
- Ground: Green Lane, Redcar
- Chairman: Kev Fryett
- Manager: Carl Jarrett
- League: Northern Premier League Premier Division
- 2025–26: Northern Premier League Division One East, 1st of 22 (promoted)

Redcar Athletic Football Club is a football club based in Redcar, North Yorkshire. The club are currently members of the Northern Premier League Premier Division.

== History ==
The club was established in 1993 as Teesside Athletic and initially played in the Teesside League. In 2005 they joined the Wearside League, and in 2010 the club's name was changed to Redcar Athletic.

Redcar have finished as Wearside League runners-up on three occasions before finally clinching their first championship in 2018, enabling them to win promotion to Division Two of the Northern League. In 2021 the club were promoted to Division One based on their results in the abandoned 2019–20 and 2020–21 seasons. The club won the Northern League Division One title in the 2024–25 season.

The 2025–26 season saw the club promoted to step 3 for the first time in the club's history, winning the Northern Premier League Division One East title.

== Ground ==
The club currently play at Green Lane in Redcar.

== Current squad ==
As of 19 August 2026

Note: Flags indicate national team as defined under FIFA eligibility rules; some limited exceptions apply. Players may hold more than one non-FIFA nationality.

No.	Pos.	Nation	Player
—	GK	ENG	Josh Mazfari
—	GK	ENG	Lewis McDonald
—	DF	ENG	Ciaran Banks
—	DF	ENG	Kevin Burgess
—	DF	ENG	Nathan Guru
—	DF	ENG	Danni Lay
—	DF	ENG	Mitchell Parkinson
—	DF	ENG	Danny Rowe
—	DF	ENG	Connor Smith
—	MF	ENG	JJ Bartliff
—	MF	ENG	Glen Butterworth

No.	Pos.	Nation	Player
—	MF	ENG	Owen Burns
—	MF	ENG	Oscar Fletcher
—	MF	ENG	Lewis Hawkins
—	MF	ENG	Curtis Round
—	MF	ENG	McCartney Woodhouse
—	FW	ROU	Andrei Ardelean
—	FW	ENG	Adam Boyes
—	FW	ENG	Bradley Fewster
—	FW	ENG	Louis Johnson
—	FW	ENG	Luke Spalding

== Honours ==
Redcar Athletic's honours
Type	Competition		Season
League	Northern Premier League	Division One East	2025–26
League	Northern League	Division One	2024–25
League	Wearside League		2017–18
Cup	Monkwearmouth Cup		2005–06, 2016–17
Cup	Shipowners Cup		2008–09
Cup	League Cup		2006–07
Cup	Total Sport Alan Hood Memorial Cup		2016–17

== Records ==
- Best FA Cup performance: Second Qualifying Round, 2026–27
- Best FA Trophy performance First Round Proper 2026–27
- Best FA Vase performance: Third round, 2024–25
- Record home attendance: 1,781 vs. Hartlepool United, pre-season friendly, 25 July 2023

== See also ==
- Redcar Town F.C.
