= Ryhope Colliery Welfare F.C. =

Association football club in England

Coordinates: 54°52′13.7418″N 1°22′51.4632″W

Ryhope Colliery Welfare
- Full name: Ryhope Colliery Welfare Football Club
- Nickname: The Colliery Welfare
- Founded: 1892
- Ground: Ryhope Recreation Park
- League: Wearside League Division Three
Home colours	Away colours

Ryhope Colliery Welfare Football Club is an association football club based in Ryhope, Sunderland, in England. They are currently members of the Wearside League Division Three and play at Ryhope Recreation Park.

== History ==
The club was founded by coal miners in Ryhope in 1892. It was not until 1927–28 that it won its first league title. However the club enjoyed most of its success in the 1960s, winning the Wearside Football League on four occasions, the Monkwearmouth Charity Cup twice as well as the Sunderland Shipowners Cup and League Challenge Cup during the decade. In the 1967–68 season, the team reached the First Round Proper of the FA Cup for the only time in its history, losing 1–0 at home to then Football League Division 4 side Workington. The club's next successful season was 1977–78, finishing 3rd in the league, winning the League Cup with the season culminating in winning the Durham Challenge Cup for the only time in the club's history. Between the 1988–89 and 1991–92 seasons, the club was known as Vaux Ryhope after a merger with Sporting Club Vaux (previously South Hetton FC).

In season 2009–10 under the guidance of newly appointed manager Martin Swales, Ryhope won the Monkwearmouth Charity Cup for the first time in 44 years, as well as being runners up in the league their highest position also for 44 years.

Season 2010–11 however was the most successful in the club's history, winning all four competitions the Wearside League Title, Sunderland Shipowners Cup, Monkwearmouth Charity Cup and League Cup. This was only the third time in the history of the League that this has been achieved by a club.

However, in season 2011–12 Ryhope repeated the feat of the previous season winning all four competitions and gained promotion to the Northern League for the first time in its history. It ended the season having only been defeated once in its last 70 Wearside League and cup games.

The team continued its success in season 2012–13 finishing runners up to Crook Town and gaining promotion to the Northern League 1st Division at its first attempt, losing only three games and scoring 147 league goals. However, due to off the field ground grading issues, rather than making the step up the club was relegated back to the Wearside League. It was a decision taken by the Northern League Management Committee and endorsed by the FA.

Season 2013–14 saw the team back in the Wearside League and finish runners up to Stockton Town and with the ground issues solved the team again was promoted to the Northern League 2nd division for the season 2014–15.

After finishing 6th in season 2014–15 the club finished runners up to South Shields in the 2015–16 season thus gaining promotion to the Northern League Division 1 under the guidance of managerial duo Gary Pearson and Stuart Gooden.

Over the next couple of seasons Ryhope CW established themselves as a stable Division 1 club. Building consistency both on and off the pitch. With Gooden parting ways with the club, Chris McCabe was brought in as joint manager alongside Pearson. Under the joint management, Ryhope CW progressed to the 3rd Round of the Buildbase FA Vase for the first time in the club's history during the 2020–21 season.

Despite on the field success, and a victory in the Durham Challenge Cup in 2022, the club struggled to maintain itself in the Northern League, and after finishing fifth in the Northern League first division they resigned from the competition in June 2022. The club folded sometime later.

In 2026 the club was resurrected and joined the Wearside League.

== Honours ==
- Wearside League
  - Champions 1927–28, 1961–62, 1962–63, 1963–64, 1965–66, 2010–11, 2011–12
  - League Challenge Cup winners 1963–64, 1977–78, 2010–11, 2011–12
- Monkwearmouth Charity Cup
  - Winners 1965–66, 1966–67, 2009–10, 2010–11, 2011–12, 2013–14
- Sunderland Shipowners Cup
  - Winners 1961–62, 2010–11, 2011–12
- Durham Challenge Cup
  - Winners 1977–78, 2022

== Records ==
- Best FA Cup performance: First round, 1967–68
- Best FA Vase performance: Third round, 2020–21
