= Hebburn Town F.C. =

Association football club in England

Coordinates: 54°58′07″N 1°31′26″W

Hebburn Town
- Full name: Hebburn Town Football Club
- Nickname: The Hornets
- Founded: 1912
- Ground: Hebburn Sports & Social Ground, Hebburn
- Capacity: 3553
- Chairman: Vin Pearson
- Manager: Daniel Moore
- League: National League North
- 2025–26: Northern Premier League Premier Division, 1st of 21 (promoted)
- Website: www.hebburntownfc.com
Home colours	Away colours	Third colours

Hebburn Town Football Club is a football club based in Hebburn, Tyne and Wear, England. The club are currently members of the National League North and play at Hebburn Sports & Social Ground, currently known as The Trustmark Group Stadium for sponsorship purposes.

== History ==
The club was founded in 1912 as a works team for the Reyrolles company. Playing under the company name, they joined Division Two of the Jarrow and District Junior League. After World War I they joined Division One of South Shields Combination League, before switching to the Tyneside Combination in 1923. They joined the Tyneside League in 1927, and were league champions in 1938–39. During World War II they joined the Northern Combination in 1941, and after winning the Durham Challenge Cup in 1942–43, they won the league title in 1943–44. The club then joined the North Eastern League for the 1944–45 season, before returning to the Northern Combination in 1945. The club remained in the Combination until rejoining a relaunched North Eastern League in 1959.

In 1960 Reyrolles joined the Wearside League, and were league champions in 1966–67. In 1986 they were renamed Hebburn Reyrolles, before changing their name to Hebburn in 1988. In 1989 they moved up to Division Two of the Northern League, and after finishing fourth in 1991–92, a season that also saw them win the Durham Challenge Cup for a second time, they were promoted to Division One. Despite finishing eleventh in 1994–95 the club were relegated back to Division Two due to issues with their ground. They were promoted again after finishing third in 1999–00 and then adopted their current name. However, they finished in the bottom two in their first season back in Division One and were relegated again.

A third-place finish in Division Two in 2011–12 saw Hebburn promoted to Division One. However, they were relegated back to Division Two at the end of the 2013–14 season. In 2017–18 the club were Division Two runners-up, resulting in promotion to Division One. In 2019–20 they won the FA Vase, beating Consett 3–2 in a match that was delayed until May 2021 due to the COVID-19 pandemic. After the 2020–21 season was also curtailed, the club were promoted to Division One East of the Northern Premier League. They won the Northern League's JR Cleator Cup in July 2021, defeating West Auckland Town 3–1 in the final. The 2022–23 season saw Hebburn finish third in Division One East, qualifying for the promotion play-offs and going on to lose 3–2 on penalties to Long Eaton United in the semi-finals after a 2–2 draw. In the same season the club won the Durham Challenge Cup for a third time, defeating Spennymoor Town on penalties in the final. The following season saw Hebburn win the Division One East title, earning promotion to the Premier Division. In 2025–26 they were Premier Division champions and were promoted to the National League North.

== Playing Squad ==
Note: Flags indicate national team as defined under FIFA eligibility rules; some limited exceptions apply. Players may hold more than one non-FIFA nationality.

No.	Pos.	Nation	Player
28	GK	ENG	Aidan Harris (On loan)
2	DEF	ENG	Aidan Heywood (Captain)
3	DEF	ENG	Dan Myers
4	DEF	ENG	Jack Donaghy (Vice Captain)
5	DEF	ENG	Matthew Elsdon
6	MID	ENG	Ethan Wood
7	MID	ENG	Matty Cornish
8	MID	ENG	Robert Briggs
9	ATT	WAL	Jake Charles
10	MID	ENG	Liam Murray
11	ATT	ENG	Tom Allan

No.	Pos.	Nation	Player
12	ATT	ENG	Josh Donaldson (On loan)
13	GK	ENG	Samuel Taylor
14	ATT	ENG	Campbell Darcy (On Loan)
15	DEF	ENG	Elliot Forbes
16	MID	ENG	Alfie Henderson
17	MID	POR	Joao Gomes
18	DEF	ENG	Coban Bird (On loan)
19	DEF	ENG	Joe Oliver
20	MID	ENG	Joe Maher
22	MID	ENG	Tom Archibald
23	DEF	ENG	Daniel Moore (Player/Manager)
24	MID	ENG	Marc Forster
25	MID	ENG	Harvey Scott
27	MID	ENG	Jaydon Jones (On loan)

As of November 2026

== Honours ==
- Northern Premier League
  - Premier Division champions 2025–26
  - Division One East champions 2023–24
- FA Vase
  - Winners 2019–20
- Northern League
  - JR Cleator Cup winners 2021
- Wearside League
  - Champions 1966–67
- Northern Combination
  - Champions 1943–44
- Tyneside League
  - Champions 1938–39
- Durham Challenge Cup
  - Winners 1942–43, 1991–92, 2022–23

== Records ==
- Best FA Cup performance: Fourth qualifying round, 2011–12
- Best FA Trophy performance: Third round, 2026–27
- Best FA Vase performance: Winners, 2019–20
- Record attendance: 1,705 vs Plymouth Parkway, FA Vase quarter-finals, 29 February 2020
- Biggest win: 13–0 vs Birtley Town, Northern League League Cup, 1 October 2019
- Heaviest defeat: 10–3

== See also ==
- Hebburn Town F.C. players
- Hebburn Town F.C. managers
