= Dunston F.C. =

Association football club in England

Coordinates: 54°57′19.591″N 1°39′2.099″W

- Full name: Dunston UTS Football Club
- Nickname: The Fed
- Founded: 1975
- Ground: Wellington Road, Gateshead
- Capacity: 2,500 (150 seated)
- Chairman: Tony Cleugh & Billy Irwin
- Manager: Jon McDonald
- League: Northern Premier League Division One East
- 2025–26: Northern Premier League Division One East, 4th of 22
Home colours	Away colours

Dunston Football Club is a football club based in the Dunston area of Gateshead, Tyne and Wear, England. They are currently members of the Northern Premier League Division One East and play at the UTS Stadium.

== History ==
The club was established as a works team by John Thompson and other HMSO employees in 1975 and were originally known as Whickham Sports. They initially played in the Newcastle City Amateur League, before moving up to the Northern Amateur League, where they won the league and League Cup double in 1977–78. In 1980 they joined the Northern Combination and in 1982 the club was renamed Dunston Mechanics. They went on to win the League Cup in 1983–84 and the league and League Cup double in 1986–87. At the end of the season they were renamed Dunston Federation Brewery and moved up to the Wearside League.

Dunston won back-to-back Wearside League titles in 1988–89 and 1989–90. After finishing as runners-up and winning the League Cup in 1990–91, the club were promoted to Division Two of the Northern League. In the club's second season in Division Two, they won the title, earning promotion to Division One. After winning three successive League Cups in 1997–98, 1998–99 and 1999–2000, the club finished as Division One runners-up in 2000–01. They went on to win back-to-back doubles of the Division One title and the League Cup in 2003–04 and 2004–05. In 2007 the club was renamed Dunston Federation after the brewery withdrew its sponsorship, before becoming Dunston UTS in 2009 as part of a sponsorship deal with UTS Engineering. In 2011–12 the club reached the final of the FA Vase, beating West Auckland Town 2–0 in the final at Wembley Stadium. They won the League Cup in 2017–18 with a 1–0 win against Bishop Auckland in the final.

In 2018–19 Dunston were Division One champions for a third time, earning promotion to Division One North West of the Northern Premier League, at which point they were renamed Dunston Football Club. League reorganisation saw them placed in Division One East for the 2021–22 season. They finished third in the division in 2023–24, qualifying for the promotion play-offs. After beating Pontefract Collieries 2–0 in the semifinals, they lost the final against Stockton Town on penalties. The following season saw them finish as runners-up in Division One East. In the subsequent play-offs they defeated Emley 1–0 in the semi-finals before losing the final against Stocksbridge Park Steels on penalties.

== Ground ==
After success in the Newcastle City Amateur League, the club leased land from Gateshead Metropolitan Borough Council, which was to become the Wellington Road ground. It was renamed the UTS Stadium as part of the sponsorship deal that saw the club renamed in 2009. The ground currently has a capacity of 2,500, of which 150 is seated and 400 covered.

== Current squad ==
As of 19 August 2026

Note: Flags indicate national team as defined under FIFA eligibility rules; some limited exceptions apply. Players may hold more than one non-FIFA nationality.

No.	Pos.	Nation	Player
—	GK	ENG	Olly Marshall
—	DF	ENG	Craig Baxter
—	DF	ENG	Tom Devitt
—	DF	ENG	Chris McDonald
—	DF	ENG	Harvey Neary
—	DF	ENG	Dan Stephenson
—	DF	ENG	Jude Swailes
—	MF	ENG	Rory Edwards
—	MF	ENG	Fin Neary
—	MF	ENG	Rory Edwards

No.	Pos.	Nation	Player
—	MF	ENG	JJ O'Donnell
—	MF	ENG	Michael Pearson
—	MF	ENG	Ben Ramsey
—	MF	ENG	David Robinson
—	MF	ENG	Callum Ross
—	MF	ENG	Wil Shaw
—	MF	ENG	Matty Taylor
—	MF	ENG	Phil Turnbull
—	MF	ENG	Dan Turner
—	FW	ENG	Nic Bollado

== Honours ==
- FA Vase
  - Winners 2011–12
- Northern League
  - Division One champions 2003–04, 2004–05, 2018–19
  - Division Two champions 1992–93
  - League Cup winners 1997–98, 1998–99, 1999–2000, 2003–04, 2004–05, 2017–18
  - Cleator Cup winners 1999–2000, 2000–01, 2003–04, 2004–05, 2005–06, 2018–19
- Wearside League
  - Champions 1988–89, 1989–90
  - League Cup winners 1990–91
- Northern Combination
  - Champions 1986–87
  - League Cup winners 1983–84, 1986–87
- Northern Amateur League
  - Champions 1977–78
  - League Cup winners 1977–78, 1978–79
  - League Shield winners 1978–79, 1979–80

== Records ==
- Best FA Cup performance: Fourth qualifying round, 2003–04, 2018–19
- Best FA Trophy performance: Second round, 2025–26
- Best FA Vase performance: Winners, 2011–12
- Record attendance: 2,520 vs Gateshead, FA Cup fourth qualifying round, 20 October 2018

== See also ==
- Dunston UTS F.C. players
- Dunston UTS F.C. managers
