= Darlington F.C. league record by opponent =

Darlington Football Club, an English association football club based in Darlington, County Durham, was founded in 1883. For their first six years, there was no league football, so matches were arranged on an occasional basis, supplemented by cup competitions organised at both local and national level. In 1889, Darlington joined the newly formed Northern League, and moved into the North-Eastern League in 1908. They were founder members of the Football League Third Division North in 1921, and spent two seasons in the Second Division in the mid-1920s. Thereafter, they remained in the lower divisions of the Football League until 1989, when they were relegated for one season to the Football Conference. After another 20 years in the Football League, they were again relegated to the Conference. Two years later, financial issues stemming from administration forced a demotion of four divisions and a change of name: Darlington 1883 was chosen. Five years later, after three promotions, they reverted to their original name.

Darlington's record against each club faced in first-team league competition is summarised below. The opening match of the inaugural Northern League season pitted them against Newcastle East End, their first Football League match was against Halifax Town, and they met their 258th and most recent different league opponent, Needham Market, for the first time in the 2024–25 National League North season. The team that Darlington have played most in league competition is Hartlepool United, whom they first met in 1908 in the North-Eastern League. The 152 encounters between the teams have produced 59 wins and 62 defeats, which are club records. Rochdale have drawn 38 league meetings with Darlington, which is more than any other opponent.

All statistics are correct up to and including the match played against Needham Market on 26 April 2025, the final day of the 2024–25 regular season.

== Key ==
- The table includes results of matches played by Darlington (under that name and as Darlington 1883) in the Northern League, the North-Eastern League, the Football League, the National League and predecessors, and the Northern Premier League. Matches from the abandoned 1939–40 Football League season are excluded, as are promotion play-offs and matches in the various wartime competitions.
- The name used for each opponent is the name they had when Darlington most recently played a league match against them. Results against each opponent include results against that club under any former name. For example, results against Leyton Orient include matches played against Orient (1966–1987) and Clapton Orient (before 1945).
- The columns headed "First" and "Last" contain the first and most recent seasons in which Darlington played league matches against each opponent.
- P = matches played; W = matches won; D = matches drawn; L = matches lost; Win % = percentage of total matches won
- Clubs with this background and marked † in the "Opponent" column are Darlington's divisional rivals in the current season, the 2022–23 National League North.
- Clubs with this background and marked ‡ in the "Opponent" column are defunct. Reserve or "A" teams that Darlington faced in the early years of their history are classed as defunct because they no longer compete in the English football league system.

== All-time league record ==
Darlington F.C. league record by opponent
Opponent	Home				Away				Total				Win %	First	Last	Notes
Opponent	P	W	D	L	P	W	D	L	P	W	D	L	Win %	First	Last	Notes
Accrington Stanley ‡	29	20	5	4	29	1	4	24	58	21	9	28	36.21	1921–22	1960–61	
Accrington Stanley	4	3	1	0	4	2	0	2	8	5	1	2	62.50	2006–07	2009–10	
AFC Bournemouth	15	5	4	6	15	3	3	9	30	8	7	15	26.67	1966–67	2009–10	(Note: AFC Bournemouth statistics include matches played against Bournemouth & Boscombe Athletic.)
AFC Fylde	3	1	1	1	4	1	0	3	7	2	1	4	28.57	2016–17	2022–23	(Note: Because of the COVID-19 pandemic, the 2020–21 National League North season was declared null and void in February 2021. Darlington had played only 11 matches, which included one against this opponent.)
AFC Telford United	8	5	0	3	7	2	2	3	15	7	2	6	46.67	2011–12	2022–23	
AFC Wimbledon	1	0	1	0	1	1	0	0	2	1	1	0	50.00	2010–11	2010–11	(Note: A year after its 2003 relocation to Milton Keynes, Wimbledon F.C. was rebranded as Milton Keynes Dons. It renounced all claims to Wimbledon's history in 2007, since when it has regarded itself as a new club founded in 2004.)
Aldershot ‡	24	10	6	8	24	10	7	7	48	20	13	15	41.67	1958–59	1990–91	
Aldershot Town	2	1	0	1	2	0	0	2	4	1	0	3	25.00	2008–09	2009–10	
Alfreton Town †	9	3	2	4	10	4	5	1	19	7	7	5	36.84	2011–12	2024–25	
Altrincham	4	2	0	2	5	1	4	0	9	3	4	2	33.33	1989–90	2019–20	(Note: Because of the COVID-19 pandemic, the 2019–20 National League season was suspended in mid-March 2020. Six weeks later, the clubs voted to end the regular season programme with immediate effect; Darlington's last nine matches, which included one against this opponent, remained unplayed.)
Ashington	10	9	1	0	10	4	1	5	20	13	2	5	65.00	1914–15	2012–13	
Ashton United	2	1	1	0	2	1	1	0	4	2	2	0	50.00	2015–16	2018–19	
Bamber Bridge	2	2	0	0	2	2	0	0	4	4	0	0	100.00	2013–14	2014–15	
Banbury United	2	1	0	1	2	0	1	1	4	1	1	2	25.00	2022–23	2023–24	
Barnet	14	6	2	6	14	3	4	7	28	9	6	13	32.14	1989–90	2009–10	
Barnsley	16	4	7	5	16	1	4	11	32	5	11	16	15.63	1925–26	1978–79	
Barrow	41	21	7	13	41	9	13	19	82	30	20	32	36.59	1921–22	2011–12	
Barwell	1	1	0	0	1	0	0	1	2	1	0	1	50.00	2015–16	2015–16	
Bath City	2	1	1	0	2	0	1	1	4	1	2	1	25.00	2010–11	2011–12	
Bedlington Terriers	1	1	0	0	1	1	0	0	2	2	0	0	100.00	2012–13	2012–13	
Bedlington United ‡	1	1	0	0	1	1	0	0	2	2	0	0	100.00	1920–21	1920–21	
Billingham Synthonia	1	1	0	0	1	1	0	0	2	2	0	0	100.00	2012–13	2012–13	
Billingham Town	1	1	0	0	1	1	0	0	2	2	0	0	100.00	2012–13	2012–13	
Birmingham City	1	0	1	0	1	0	0	1	2	0	1	1	0.00	1991–92	1991–92	
Birtley ‡	1	0	1	0	1	1	0	0	2	1	1	0	50.00	1889–90	1889–90	
Bishop Auckland	17	10	3	4	17	6	4	7	34	16	7	11	47.06	1889–90	2012–13	(Note: Bishop Auckland statistics include matches played against Auckland Town.)
Bishop's Stortford	1	0	0	1	1	0	0	1	2	0	0	2	0.00	2023–24	2023–24	
Blackpool	10	2	3	5	10	2	3	5	20	4	6	10	20.00	1925–26	2000–01	
Blyth Spartans	12	10	2	0	11	5	4	2	23	15	6	2	65.22	1913–14	2023–24	
Bolton Wanderers	4	2	0	2	4	1	1	2	8	3	1	4	37.50	1985–86	1991–92	
Boston United	12	9	1	2	13	3	3	7	25	12	4	9	48.00	1989–90	2023–24	
Brackley Town †	8	1	3	4	9	2	1	6	17	3	4	10	17.65	2016–17	2024–25	
Bradford City	38	18	8	12	38	8	5	25	76	26	13	37	34.21	1925–26	2009–10	
Bradford Park Avenue	28	14	6	8	26	8	5	13	54	22	11	21	40.74	1922–23	2022–23	
Bradford Park Avenue reserves ‡	1	1	0	0	1	0	0	1	2	1	0	1	50.00	1908–09	1908–09	
Braintree Town	1	1	0	0	1	0	0	1	2	1	0	1	50.00	2011–12	2011–12	
Brentford	17	5	4	8	17	4	3	10	34	9	7	18	26.47	1962–63	2008–09	
Brighouse Town	1	1	0	0	1	1	0	0	2	2	0	0	100.00	2014–15	2014–15	
Brighton & Hove Albion	8	4	1	3	8	2	2	4	16	6	3	7	37.50	1963–64	2000–01	
Bristol City	4	0	3	1	4	0	2	2	8	0	5	3	0.00	1982–83	1986–87	
Bristol Rovers	9	2	4	3	9	2	1	6	18	4	5	9	22.22	1966–67	2006–07	
Burnley	3	2	1	0	3	1	0	2	6	3	1	2	50.00	1987–88	1990–91	
Burscough	2	1	0	1	2	1	1	0	4	2	1	1	50.00	2013–14	2014–15	
Burton Albion	1	1	0	0	1	1	0	0	2	2	0	0	100.00	2009–10	2009–10	
Bury	24	8	7	9	24	5	7	12	48	13	14	21	27.08	1957–58	2009–10	
Buxton †	4	2	1	1	4	0	0	4	8	2	1	5	25.00	2015–16	2024–25	
Cambridge United	17	6	7	4	17	5	0	12	34	11	7	16	32.35	1970–71	2011–12	
Cammell Laird	1	1	0	0	1	1	0	0	2	2	0	0	100.00	2013–14	2013–14	
Cardiff City	9	5	2	2	9	3	2	4	18	8	4	6	44.44	1985–86	2000–01	
Carlisle United	50	26	10	14	50	16	16	18	100	42	26	32	42.00	1910–11	2005–06	
Carlisle United reserves ‡	2	2	0	0	2	2	0	0	4	4	0	0	100.00	1908–09	1909–10	
Celtic Nation ‡	1	1	0	0	1	1	0	0	2	2	0	0	100.00	2012–13	2012–13	
Chelsea	2	0	2	0	2	0	1	1	4	0	3	1	0.00	1925–26	1926–27	
Cheltenham Town	8	6	1	1	8	2	4	2	16	8	5	3	50.00	1989–90	2010–11	
Chester †	6	4	0	2	6	1	2	3	12	5	2	5	41.67	2018–19	2024–25	(Note: Chester City statistics include Football League matches played against the club under its former name of Chester. The Chester F.C. founded in 2010 is a different club.)
Chester City ‡	52	24	16	12	52	16	10	26	104	40	26	38	38.46	1931–32	2008–09	
Chester-le-Street ‡	1	1	0	0	1	1	0	0	2	2	0	0	100.00	1920–21	1920–21	
Chesterfield	38	18	11	9	38	5	12	21	76	23	23	30	30.26	1921–22	2000–01	
Chorley †	8	3	3	2	8	1	2	5	16	4	5	7	25.00	1989–90	2024–25	
Clitheroe	2	1	1	0	2	1	0	1	4	2	1	1	50.00	2013–14	2014–15	
Colchester United	22	11	4	7	22	7	3	12	44	18	7	19	40.91	1961–62	1997–98	
Colwyn Bay	1	1	0	0	1	1	0	0	2	2	0	0	100.00	2015–16	2015–16	
Consett	1	1	0	0	1	1	0	0	2	2	0	0	100.00	2012–13	2012–13	
Coventry City	1	0	0	1	1	0	1	0	2	0	1	1	0.00	1958–59	1958–59	
Crawley Town	1	0	1	0	1	0	0	1	2	0	1	1	0.00	2010–11	2010–11	
Crewe Alexandra	57	28	15	14	57	10	18	29	114	38	33	43	33.33	1921–22	2009–10	
Crook Town	12	11	0	1	12	5	4	3	24	16	4	4	66.67	1896–97	1907–08	
Crystal Palace	3	0	1	2	3	0	0	3	6	0	1	5	0.00	1958–59	1960–61	
Curzon Ashton †	8	1	1	6	10	3	2	5	18	4	3	11	22.22	2013–14	2024–25	
Dagenham & Redbridge	3	1	0	2	3	2	0	1	6	3	0	3	50.00	2007–08	2009–10	
Darlington St Augustine's ‡	16	11	2	3	16	11	5	0	32	22	7	3	68.75	1889–90	1907–08	
Derby County	4	3	1	0	4	1	2	1	8	4	3	1	50.00	1925–26	1985–86	
Doncaster Rovers	47	19	15	13	47	15	5	27	94	34	20	40	36.17	1923–24	2003–04	
Droylsden	1	1	0	0	1	0	0	1	2	1	0	1	50.00	2014–15	2014–15	
Dunston UTS	1	1	0	0	1	1	0	0	2	2	0	0	100.00	2012–13	2012–13	
Durham City	8	6	2	0	8	3	2	3	16	9	4	3	56.25	1919–20	2012–13	
Eastbourne Borough	1	1	0	0	1	0	1	0	2	1	1	0	50.00	2010–11	2010–11	
Ebbsfleet	1	0	0	1	1	1	0	0	2	1	0	1	50.00	2011–12	2011–12	
Elswick Rangers ‡	1	1	0	0	1	0	0	1	2	1	0	1	50.00	1889–90	1889–90	
Enfield ‡	1	1	0	0	1	1	0	0	2	2	0	0	100.00	1989–90	1989–90	
Exeter City	30	17	8	5	30	8	9	13	60	25	17	18	41.67	1958–59	2008–09	
Farnborough Town	1	0	1	0	1	0	0	1	2	0	1	1	0.00	1989–90	1989–90	
Farsley Celtic †	7	4	2	1	8	3	0	5	14	6	2	6	42.86	2013–14	2024–25	(Note: Farsley Celtic statistics include matches played against Farsley.)
FC Halifax Town	1	1	0	0	1	0	1	0	2	1	1	0	50.00	2016–17	2016–17	
F.C. United of Manchester	3	3	0	0	3	3	0	0	6	6	0	0	100.00	2016–17	2018–19	
Fisher Athletic ‡	1	1	0	0	1	1	0	0	2	2	0	0	100.00	1989–90	1989–90	
Fleetwood Town	2	1	0	1	2	0	1	1	4	1	1	2	25.00	2010–11	2011–12	
Forest Green Rovers	2	1	1	0	2	0	1	1	4	1	2	1	25.00	2010–11	2011–12	
Frickley Athletic	1	1	0	0	1	0	0	1	2	1	0	1	50.00	2015–16	2015–16	
Fulham	7	2	2	3	7	0	1	6	14	2	3	9	14.29	1925–26	1996–97	
Gainsborough Trinity	2	2	0	0	2	0	1	1	4	2	1	1	50.00	2016–17	2017–18	
Gateshead ‡	34	19	7	8	34	11	9	14	68	30	16	22	44.12	1908–09	1959–60	(Note: Gateshead A.F.C. statistics include matches played against South Shields Adelaide and South Shields.)
Gateshead	4	1	1	2	3	0	2	1	7	1	3	3	14.29	2010–11	2021–22	
Gateshead Town ‡	4	3	1	0	4	3	1	0	8	6	2	0	75.00	1911–12	1914–15	
Gillingham	18	6	8	4	18	3	4	11	36	9	12	15	25.00	1958–59	2008–09	
Gloucester City	5	3	2	0	5	3	1	1	10	6	3	1	60.00	2016–17	2023–24	
Grangetown Athletic ‡	7	2	1	4	7	1	1	5	14	3	2	9	21.43	1901–02	1907–08	
Grantham Town	1	1	0	0	1	1	0	0	2	2	0	0	100.00	2015–16	2015–16	
Grimsby Town	26	9	8	9	26	11	4	11	52	20	12	20	38.46	1921–22	2011–12	
Guisborough Town	1	1	0	0	1	0	0	1	2	1	0	1	50.00	2012–13	2012–13	
Guiseley	3	1	1	1	4	2	0	2	6	2	1	3	33.33	2018–19	2021–22	
Halesowen Town	1	1	0	0	1	1	0	0	2	2	0	0	100.00	2015–16	2015–16	
Halifax Town	50	29	9	12	50	13	13	24	100	42	22	36	42.00	1921–22	2001–02	
Harrogate Railway Athletic	2	1	1	0	2	2	0	0	4	3	1	0	75.00	2013–14	2014–15	
Harrogate Town	2	1	0	1	2	1	0	1	4	2	0	2	50.00	2016–17	2017–18	
Hartlepool United	76	35	18	23	76	24	13	39	152	59	31	62	38.82	1908–09	2006–07	(Note: Hartlepool United statistics include matches played against Hartlepools United and Hartlepool.)
Hayes & Yeading United	2	0	1	1	2	0	0	2	4	0	1	3	0.00	2010–11	2011–12	
Hebburn Argyle ‡	7	5	2	0	7	2	1	4	14	7	3	4	50.00	1908–09	1914–15	
Hebburn Town	1	1	0	0	1	1	0	0	2	2	0	0	100.00	2012–13	2012–13	
Hereford †	6	4	2	0	6	2	2	2	12	6	4	2	50.00	2018–19	2024–25	
Hereford United ‡	19	9	5	5	19	3	9	7	38	12	14	12	31.58	1972–73	2009–10	
Histon	1	1	0	0	1	1	0	0	2	2	0	0	100.00	2010–11	2010–11	
Houghton Rovers ‡	5	3	1	1	5	5	0	0	10	8	1	1	80.00	1912–13	1920–21	
Howden-le-Wear ‡	2	2	0	0	2	1	0	1	4	3	0	1	75.00	1894–95	1895–96	
Huddersfield Town	8	3	1	4	8	1	1	6	16	4	2	10	25.00	1908–09	2003–04	
Hull City	24	7	4	13	24	7	5	12	48	14	9	25	29.17	1925–26	2003–04	
Hyde United	1	0	0	1	1	1	0	0	2	1	0	1	50.00	2015–16	2015–16	
Ilkeston ‡	1	1	0	0	1	0	1	0	2	1	1	0	50.00	2015–16	2015–16	
Jarrow	7	7	0	0	7	2	2	3	14	9	2	3	64.29	1910–11	1920–21	(Note: Jarrow statistics include matches played against Jarrow Croft and Palmers (Jarrow).)
Kendal Town	2	2	0	0	2	1	0	1	4	3	0	1	75.00	2013–14	2014–15	
Kettering Town	6	3	2	1	5	2	3	0	11	5	5	1	45.45	1989–90	2022–23	
Kidderminster Harriers †	16	7	2	7	15	3	5	7	31	10	7	14	32.26	1989–90	2024–25	
King's Lynn Town †	3	1	0	2	4	1	0	3	7	2	0	5	28.57	2019–20	2024–25	
Lancaster City	2	1	0	1	2	0	2	0	4	1	2	1	25.00	2013–14	2014–15	
Leadgate Park	5	5	0	0	5	2	1	2	10	7	1	2	70.00	1896–97	1907–08	
Leamington †	5	1	4	0	6	2	1	3	11	3	5	3	27.27	2017–18	2024–25	
Leyton Orient	17	8	6	3	17	3	3	11	34	11	9	14	32.35	1925–26	2005–06	(Note: Leyton Orient statistics include matches played against Clapton Orient and Orient.)
Lincoln City	55	24	20	11	55	10	13	32	110	34	33	43	30.91	1921–22	2011–12	
Luton Town	7	3	3	1	7	1	0	6	14	4	3	7	28.57	1965–66	2011–12	
Macclesfield Town	13	5	4	4	13	3	5	5	26	8	9	9	30.77	1989–90	2009–10	
Maidstone United ‡	1	0	1	0	1	1	0	0	2	1	1	0	50.00	1990–91	1990–91	
Manchester City	1	0	1	0	1	0	0	1	2	0	1	1	0.00	1926–27	1926–27	
Mansfield Town	45	22	10	13	45	7	9	29	90	29	19	42	32.22	1989–90	2011–12	
Marine †	2	1	0	1	2	1	1	0	4	2	1	1	50.00	2015–16	2024–25	
Marske United	1	1	0	0	1	1	0	0	2	2	0	0	100.00	2012–13	2012–13	
Matlock Town	1	1	0	0	1	1	0	0	2	2	0	0	100.00	2015–16	2015–16	
Merthyr Tydfil ‡	1	0	1	0	1	0	1	0	2	0	2	0	0.00	1989–90	1989–90	
Mickleover Sports	1	1	0	0	1	1	0	0	2	2	0	0	100.00	2015–16	2015–16	
Middlesbrough	14	5	1	8	14	0	3	11	28	5	4	19	17.86	1889–90	1986–87	
Middlesbrough A ‡	13	8	2	3	13	1	4	8	26	9	6	11	34.62	1902–03	1920–21	
Middlesbrough Ironopolis ‡	3	1	0	2	3	0	0	3	6	1	0	5	16.67	1890–91	1892–93	
Millwall	5	1	1	3	5	2	1	2	10	3	2	5	30.00	1958–59	1964–65	
Milton Keynes Dons	2	1	0	1	2	0	0	2	4	1	0	3	25.00	2006–07	2007–08	
Morecambe	3	0	2	1	3	1	0	2	6	1	2	3	16.67	2007–08	2009–10	
Mossley	2	2	0	0	2	2	0	0	4	4	0	0	100.00	2013–14	2014–15	
Nantwich Town	1	1	0	0	1	1	0	0	2	2	0	0	100.00	2015–16	2015–16	
Needham Market †	1	1	0	0	1	1	0	0	2	2	0	0	100.00	2024–25	2024–25	
Nelson	7	5	0	2	7	1	2	4	14	6	2	6	42.86	1921–22	1930–31	
New Brighton ‡	19	16	0	3	19	3	5	11	38	19	5	14	50.00	1923–24	1950–51	
New Mills	2	2	0	0	2	2	0	0	4	4	0	0	100.00	2013–14	2014–15	
Newcastle Benfield	1	1	0	0	1	1	0	0	2	2	0	0	100.00	2012–13	2012–13	
Newcastle City ‡	4	4	0	0	4	2	1	1	8	6	1	1	75.00	1911–12	1914–15	
Newcastle East End ‡	4	1	1	2	4	0	0	4	8	1	1	6	12.50	1889–90	1892–93	
Newcastle United A ‡	13	4	5	4	13	3	2	8	26	7	7	12	26.92	1902–03	1920–21	
Newcastle West End ‡	3	1	0	2	3	0	0	3	6	1	0	5	16.67	1889–90	1891–92	
Newport County	22	13	3	6	22	2	5	15	44	15	8	21	34.09	1962–63	2011–12	
Newton Aycliffe	1	1	0	0	1	0	0	1	2	1	0	1	50.00	2012–13	2012–13	
North Ferriby United ‡	1	1	0	0	1	0	1	0	2	1	1	0	50.00	2017–18	2017–18	
North Shields Athletic	7	6	1	0	7	2	1	4	14	8	2	4	57.14	1908–09	1914–15	
North Skelton Rovers ‡	2	2	0	0	2	2	0	0	4	4	0	0	100.00	1893–94	1894–95	
Northampton Town	29	12	9	8	29	6	9	14	58	18	18	22	31.03	1958–59	2009–10	
Northwich Victoria	3	1	0	2	3	1	1	1	6	2	1	3	33.33	1989–90	2014–15	
Norton & Stockton Ancients ‡	1	1	0	0	1	1	0	0	2	2	0	0	100.00	2012–13	2012–13	
Nottingham Forest	2	1	1	0	2	0	0	2	4	1	1	2	25.00	1925–26	1926–27	
Notts County	17	7	3	7	17	2	7	8	34	9	10	15	26.47	1926–27	2009–10	
Nuneaton Town	3	0	1	2	3	1	1	1	6	1	2	3	16.67	2016–17	2018–19	
Oldham Athletic	25	9	8	8	25	4	6	15	50	13	14	23	26.00	1925–26	1988–89	
Ossett Albion	2	2	0	0	2	2	0	0	4	4	0	0	100.00	2013–14	2014–15	
Ossett Town	2	2	0	0	2	2	0	0	4	4	0	0	100.00	2013–14	2014–15	
Oxford City †	1	0	1	0	1	0	1	0	2	0	2	0	0.00	2024–25	2024–25	
Oxford United	9	5	1	3	9	3	1	5	18	8	2	8	44.44	1962–63	2005–06	
Padiham	2	2	0	0	2	2	0	0	4	4	0	0	100.00	2013–14	2014–15	
Penrith	1	1	0	0	1	1	0	0	2	2	0	0	100.00	2012–13	2012–13	
Peterborough Sports †	3	2	1	0	3	1	0	2	6	3	1	2	50.00	2022–23	2024–25	
Peterborough United	24	12	9	3	24	6	9	9	48	18	18	12	37.50	1906–61	2007–08	
Plymouth Argyle	6	3	0	3	6	2	2	2	12	5	2	5	41.67	1985–86	2001–02	
Port Vale	21	9	8	4	21	4	4	13	42	13	12	17	30.95	1925–26	2009–10	
Portsmouth	4	2	1	1	4	0	1	3	8	2	2	4	25.00	1925–26	1979–80	
Prescot Cables	2	1	1	0	2	1	1	0	4	2	2	0	50.00	2013–14	2014–15	
Preston North End	6	0	2	4	6	1	2	3	12	1	4	7	8.33	1925–26	1995–96	
Queens Park Rangers	1	0	1	0	1	0	0	1	2	0	1	1	0.00	1966–67	1966–67	
Radcliffe †	3	2	1	0	3	2	1	0	5	3	2	0	60.00	2013–14	2024–25	(Note: Radcliffe statistics include matches played against Radcliffe Borough.)
Ramsbottom United	2	1	0	1	2	1	0	1	4	2	0	2	50.00	2013–14	2015–16	
Reading	12	4	2	6	12	1	1	10	24	5	3	16	20.83	1926–27	1991–92	
Rochdale	69	39	15	15	69	12	23	34	138	51	38	49	36.96	1921–22	2009–10	
Rotherham United	30	18	10	2	30	11	7	12	60	29	17	14	48.33	1923–24	2009–10	
Runcorn ‡	1	0	1	0	1	0	0	1	2	0	1	1	0.00	1989–90	1989–90	
Rushall Olympic †	3	1	2	0	3	0	1	2	6	1	3	2	16.67	2015–16	2024–25	
Rushden & Diamonds ‡	5	2	3	0	5	1	1	3	10	3	4	3	30.00	2001–02	2010–11	
Salford City	5	1	2	2	5	3	0	2	10	4	2	4	40.00	2013–14	2017–18	
Saltburn ‡	1	0	1	0	1	1	0	0	2	1	1	0	50.00	1907–08	1907–08	
Saltburn Swifts ‡	1	1	0	0	1	1	0	0	2	2	0	0	100.00	1895–96	1895–96	
Scarborough ‡	18	12	2	4	18	8	2	8	36	20	4	12	55.56	1900–01	1998–99	
Scarborough Athletic †	4	2	0	2	4	2	0	2	8	4	0	4	50.00	2014–15	2024–25	
Scotswood	2	2	0	0	2	1	0	1	4	3	0	1	75.00	1919–20	1920–21	
Scunthorpe United †	41	21	12	8	41	8	8	25	81	28	20	33	34.57	1950–51	2024–25	
Seaham Harbour ‡	6	6	0	0	6	4	2	0	12	10	2	0	83.33	1908–09	1913–14	(Note: Seaham Harbour statistics include matches played against Seaham White Star.)
Sheffield United	3	1	0	2	3	0	1	2	6	1	1	4	16.67	1891–92	1981–82	
Sheffield Wednesday	1	1	0	0	1	0	0	1	2	1	0	1	50.00	1925–26	1925–26	
Shildon	14	12	2	0	14	6	4	4	28	18	6	4	64.29	1903–04	2012–13	(Note: Shildon statistics include matches played against Shildon Athletic.)
Shrewsbury Town	19	9	5	5	19	4	5	10	38	13	10	15	34.21	1950–51	2009–10	
Skelmersdale United	1	1	0	0	1	0	1	0	2	1	1	0	50.00	2015–16	2015–16	
South Bank	17	10	2	5	17	3	2	12	34	13	4	17	38.24	1889–90	1907–08	
South Shields †	3	1	2	0	3	3	0	0	6	4	2	0	66.67	2012–13	2024–25	
South Shields reserves ‡	2	1	0	1	2	0	1	1	4	1	1	2	25.00	1919–20	1920–21	(Note: This is the reserve team of the club later known as Gateshead A.F.C., but is listed as South Shields reserves because Darlington only faced them under that name, before the club's move to Gateshead.)
Southampton	2	1	0	1	2	0	0	2	4	1	0	3	25.00	1925–26	1926–27	
Southend United	16	6	5	5	16	2	5	9	32	8	10	14	25.00	1967–68	2004–05	
Southport †	52	28	10	14	51	9	11	31	102	36	21	45	35.29	1921–22	2024–25	
Spennymoor Town †	10	4	4	2	9	3	3	3	19	7	7	5	36.84	2012–13	2024–25	
Spennymoor United ‡	12	9	3	0	12	4	1	7	24	13	4	7	54.17	1905–06	1920–21	
Stafford Rangers	1	1	0	0	1	1	0	0	2	2	0	0	100.00	1989–90	1989–90	
Stalybridge Celtic	3	3	0	0	3	1	0	2	6	4	0	2	66.67	1921–22	2016–17	
Stamford	1	1	0	0	1	1	0	0	2	2	0	0	100.00	2015–16	2015–16	
Stockport County	58	27	12	19	58	7	14	37	116	34	26	56	29.31	1921–22	2018–19	
Stockton ‡	19	11	4	4	19	2	4	13	38	13	8	17	34.21	1889–90	1907–08	
Stockton St John's ‡	4	3	0	1	4	2	0	2	8	5	0	3	62.50	1899–1900	1902–03	
Stoke City	2	0	0	2	2	0	0	2	4	0	0	4	0.00	1925–26	1991–92	
Stourbridge	1	0	1	0	1	0	0	1	2	0	1	1	0.00	2015–16	2015–16	
Sunderland A ‡	13	7	3	3	13	4	1	8	26	11	4	11	42.31	1902–03	1920–21	
Sunderland Albion ‡	2	2	0	0	2	0	0	2	4	2	0	2	50.00	1890–91	1891–92	
Sunderland Royal Rovers ‡	7	7	0	0	7	5	0	2	14	12	0	2	85.71	1908–09	1914–15	
Sunderland RCA	1	1	0	0	1	1	0	0	2	2	0	0	100.00	2012–13	2012–13	
Sutton Coldfield Town	1	1	0	0	1	1	0	0	2	2	0	0	100.00	2015–16	2015–16	
Sutton United	1	1	0	0	1	0	0	1	2	1	0	1	50.00	1989–90	1989–90	
Swansea City	22	11	9	2	22	2	7	13	44	13	16	15	29.55	1925–26	2004–05	(Note: Swansea City statistics include matches played against Swansea Town.)
Swindon Town	6	4	1	1	6	1	1	4	12	5	2	5	41.67	1966–67	2006–07	
Tamworth	5	3	0	2	5	0	2	3	10	3	2	5	30.00	2010–11	2023–24	
Team Northumbria	1	1	0	0	1	0	0	1	2	1	0	1	50.00	2012–13	2012–13	
Telford United ‡	1	0	1	0	1	1	0	0	2	1	1	0	50.00	1989–90	1989–90	
Thornaby Utopians ‡	2	2	0	0	2	1	0	1	4	3	0	1	75.00	1899–1900	1900–01	
Torquay United	39	14	12	13	39	10	9	20	78	24	21	33	30.77	1958–59	2009–10	
Tow Law	6	6	0	0	6	3	1	2	12	9	1	2	75.00	1894–95	1899–1900	
Tranmere Rovers	41	20	6	15	41	11	7	23	82	31	13	38	37.80	1921–22	1998–89	
Wakefield ‡	1	1	0	0	1	1	0	0	2	2	0	0	100.00	2013–14	2013–14	
Wallsend ‡	9	8	0	1	9	6	1	2	18	14	1	3	77.78	1908–09	1920–21	(Note: Wallsend statistics include matches played against Wallsend Park Villa.)
Walsall	20	8	5	7	20	1	8	11	40	9	13	18	22.50	1921–22	2006–07	
Warrington Town †	4	2	2	0	4	3	1	0	8	5	3	0	62.50	2013–14	2024–25	
Watford	6	2	3	1	6	0	2	4	12	2	5	5	16.67	1958–59	1997–88	
Welling United	1	1	0	0	1	1	0	0	2	2	0	0	100.00	1989–90	1989–90	
West Auckland Town	1	1	0	0	1	0	0	1	2	1	0	1	50.00	2012–13	2012–13	
West Bromwich Albion	1	0	0	1	1	0	0	1	2	0	0	2	0.00	1991–92	1991–92	
West Hartlepool ‡	8	5	1	2	8	5	1	2	16	10	2	4	62.50	1900–01	1907–08	
West Stanley ‡	9	8	0	1	9	4	0	5	18	12	0	6	66.67	1908–09	1920–21	
Whitby Town	5	3	1	1	5	4	0	1	10	7	1	2	70.00	1893–94	2015–16	(Note: Whitby Town statistics include matches played against Whitby.)
Whitley Bay	1	1	0	0	1	1	0	0	2	2	0	0	100.00	2012–13	2012–13	
Wigan Athletic	11	5	4	2	11	1	3	7	22	6	7	9	27.27	1978–79	1996–97	
Wigan Borough ‡	8	7	0	1	8	1	3	4	16	8	3	5	50.00	1921–22	1930–31	
Wimbledon ‡	4	2	1	1	4	0	2	2	8	2	3	3	25.00	1977–78	1982–83	
Wingate Albion	4	3	1	0	4	3	1	0	8	6	2	0	75.00	1909–10	1912–13	
Wolverhampton Wanderers	5	2	2	1	5	0	0	5	10	2	2	6	20.00	1923–24	1987–88	
Worcester City	1	1	0	0	1	0	1	0	2	1	1	0	50.00	2016–17	2016–17	
Workington ‡	1	1	0	0	1	0	1	0	2	1	1	0	50.00	1910–11	1910–11	
Workington reserves ‡	2	1	1	0	2	1	0	1	4	2	1	1	50.00	1908–09	1909–10	
Workington	25	14	8	3	25	6	7	12	50	20	15	15	40.00	1951–52	2015–16	
Wrexham	47	25	14	8	47	6	11	30	94	31	25	38	32.98	1921–22	2011–12	
Wycombe Wanderers	7	3	2	2	7	2	2	3	14	5	4	5	35.71	1989–90	2008–09	
Yeovil Town	3	3	0	0	3	1	1	1	6	4	1	1	66.67	1989–90	2004–05	
York City	55	29	13	13	55	7	15	33	110	36	28	46	32.73	1929–30	2021–22	

== Sources ==
- Hunt, Brian (1989). Northern Goalfields. Official Centenary History of the Northern League 1889–1989. Skol Northern League Management Committee. ISBN 0-9514597-1-6.
- Tweddle, Frank (2000). The Definitive Darlington F.C. Nottingham: SoccerData. ISBN 978-1-899468-15-7.
