= 1898–99 Northern Football League =

Northern League
- Season: 1898–99

The 1898–99 Northern Football League season was the tenth in the history of the Northern Football League, a football competition in Northern England.

== Division One ==
Northern League Division One
- Season: 1898–99
- Champions: Bishop Auckland
- Matches: 72
- Goals: 246 (3.42 per match)

The division featured 9 clubs which competed in the last season, no new clubs joined the league this season.

=== League table ===
Pos	Team	Pld	W	D	L	GF	GA	GR	Pts	Promotion or relegation
1	Bishop Auckland	16	9	7	0	35	16	2.188	25	
2	Darlington	16	10	3	3	50	29	1.724	23	
3	Middlesbrough	16	7	4	5	29	27	1.074	18	Promoted to the Football League Division Two
4	South Bank	16	6	6	4	20	21	0.952	18	
5	Darlington St Augustine's	16	5	5	6	19	23	0.826	15	
6	Leadgate Park	16	4	4	8	25	30	0.833	12	Left the league
7	Stockton	16	4	4	8	25	31	0.806	12	
8	Tow Law	16	3	6	7	18	25	0.720	12	
9	Crook Town	16	4	1	11	25	44	0.568	9	

== Division Two ==
Northern League Division Two
- Season: 1898–99
- Champions: Stockton St. John's
- Promoted: Stockton St. John's; Thornaby Utopians
- Matches: 86
- Goals: 291 (3.38 per match)

The division featured 4 clubs which competed in the last season, along with six new clubs:

- Scarborough
- Stockton St. John's
- Stockton Vulcan
- Thornaby
- Thornaby Utopians
- West Hartlepool

=== League table ===
Pos	Team	Pld	W	D	L	GF	GA	GR	Pts	Promotion or relegation
1	Stockton St. John's	18	11	5	2	38	11	3.455	27	Promoted to the Division One
2	Thornaby Utopians	18	10	4	4	45	21	2.143	24	Promoted to the Division One
3	Thornaby	18	10	1	7	42	28	1.500	21	
4	Brotton	17	9	2	6	33	22	1.500	20 (Note: Four games were not played during the season: Howden-le-Wear v Brotton; Scarborough v Shildon United; Shildon United v Scarborough; Stockton Vulcan v Loftus)	
5	Stockton Vulcan	17	10	0	7	29	30	0.967	20	
6	Shildon United	16	7	1	8	21	20	1.050	15	
7	West Hartlepool	18	6	1	11	23	48	0.479	13	
8	Scarborough	16	5	1	10	21	37	0.568	11	
9	Loftus	17	4	3	10	18	41	0.439	11	
10	Howden-le-Wear	17	4	2	11	21	33	0.636	10	Left the league
