= 1902–03 Northern Football League =

The 1902–03 Northern Football League season was the fourteenth in the history of the Northern Football League, a football competition in Northern England.

== Clubs ==
Northern League
- Season: 1902–03
- Champions: Newcastle United A
- Matches: 156
- Goals: 571 (3.66 per match)

The league featured 10 clubs which competed in the last season, along with three new clubs:

- Middlesbrough A
- Newcastle United A
- Sunderland A

=== League table ===
Pos	Team	Pld	W	D	L	GF	GA	GR	Pts
1	Newcastle United A	24	22	0	2	100	14	7.143	42 (Note: Newcastle United A deducted two points for fielding an ineligible player.)
2	Sunderland A	24	18	4	2	93	22	4.227	40
3	Middlesbrough A	24	13	7	4	66	30	2.200	33
4	Bishop Auckland	24	13	3	8	57	35	1.629	29
5	Stockton	24	9	5	10	35	38	0.921	23
6	Darlington	24	10	3	11	34	50	0.680	23
7	South Bank	24	8	6	10	30	44	0.682	22
8	Crook Town	24	9	4	11	27	41	0.659	22
9	Grangetown Athletic	24	8	4	12	34	47	0.723	20
10	Stockton St. John's	24	6	5	13	24	52	0.462	15 (Note: Stockton St. John's deducted two points for fielding an ineligible player.)
11	Scarborough	24	5	4	15	23	69	0.333	14
12	Darlington St Augustine's	24	4	5	15	21	58	0.362	13
13	West Hartlepool	24	3	6	15	27	71	0.380	12
