= 1907–08 Northern Football League =

The 1907–08 Northern Football League season was the nineteenth in the history of the Northern Football League, a football competition in Northern England.

A Championship Play-Off between South Bank and Stockton, who finished the season level on points, was played on 19 September 1908 at the home ground of Darlington St. Augustine's. South Bank were declared League Champions after a 2–0 victory.

== Clubs ==
Northern League
- Season: 1907–08
- Champions: South Bank
- Matches: 132
- Goals: 476 (3.61 per match)

The league featured 11 clubs which competed in the last season, along with one new club:

- Saltburn

=== League table ===
Pos	Team	Pld	W	D	L	GF	GA	GR	Pts	Promotion or relegation
1	South Bank	22	15	3	4	53	26	2.038	33	Qualified for the championship match
2	Stockton	22	13	7	2	49	21	2.333	33	Qualified for the championship match
3	Crook Town	22	12	4	6	40	33	1.212	28	
4	West Hartlepool	22	10	4	8	40	32	1.250	24	
5	Spennymoor United	22	11	2	9	39	36	1.083	24	Joined North Eastern League
6	Bishop Auckland	22	9	4	9	40	36	1.111	22	
7	Darlington St Augustine's	22	9	3	10	32	39	0.821	21	
8	Saltburn	22	9	2	11	46	47	0.979	20	
9	Darlington	22	9	2	11	39	41	0.951	20	Joined North Eastern League
10	Leadgate Park	22	6	4	12	33	43	0.767	16	
11	Grangetown Athletic	22	3	7	12	21	52	0.404	13	
12	Scarborough	22	5	0	17	44	70	0.629	10	

== Championship match ==
- 19 September 1908: South Bank 2–0 Stockton
