= 1905–06 Northern Football League =

The 1905–06 Northern Football League season was the seventeenth in the history of the Northern Football League, a football competition in Northern England.

A championship match between the Professional Champions, Sunderland A, and the Amateur Champions, Bishop Auckland, was played on 28 April 1906. The match was a 1–1 draw.

== Clubs ==
Northern League
- Season: 1905–06
- Champions: Sunderland A (Professional Champions); Bishop Auckland (Amateur Champions)
- Matches: 182
- Goals: 647 (3.55 per match)

The league featured 13 clubs which competed in the last season, along with one new club:

- Spennymoor United

=== League table ===
Pos	Team	Pld	W	D	L	GF	GA	GR	Pts	Promotion or relegation
1	Sunderland A	26	21	3	2	90	21	4.286	45	Qualified for the championship match and then founder member of North Eastern League
2	Newcastle United A	26	19	4	3	92	14	6.571	42	Founder member of North Eastern League
3	Bishop Auckland	26	15	3	8	45	39	1.154	33	Qualified for the championship match
4	Darlington	26	12	7	7	47	47	1.000	31	
5	Middlesbrough A	26	12	5	9	59	30	1.967	29	Founder member of North Eastern League
6	South Bank	26	13	2	11	49	35	1.400	28	
7	Shildon Athletic	26	11	6	9	40	45	0.889	28	
8	Spennymoor United	26	8	6	12	34	34	1.000	22	
9	Grangetown Athletic	26	9	2	15	37	43	0.860	20	
10	Stockton	26	7	5	14	32	54	0.593	19	
11	Crook Town	26	7	5	14	33	57	0.579	19	
12	West Hartlepool	26	7	5	14	49	65	0.754	17 (Note: West Hartlepool deducted two points for fielding an ineligible player.)	
13	Scarborough	26	7	2	17	24	93	0.258	16	
14	Darlington St Augustine's	26	3	7	16	16	70	0.229	13	

== Championship match ==
- 28 April 1906: Sunderland A 1–1 Bishop Auckland
