= 1908–09 Northern Football League =

The 1908–09 Northern Football League season was the twentieth in the history of the Northern Football League, a football competition in Northern England.

A Championship Play-Off between Bishop Auckland and South Bank, who finished the season level on points, was played on 27 November 1909 at the home ground of Darlington St Augustine's. Bishop Auckland were declared League Champions after a 4–2 victory.

== Clubs ==
Northern League
- Season: 1908–09
- Champions: Bishop Auckland
- Matches: 132
- Goals: 539 (4.08 per match)

The league featured 10 clubs which competed in the last season, along with two new clubs:

- West Auckland
- York City

=== League table ===
Pos	Team	Pld	W	D	L	GF	GA	GR	Pts	Promotion or relegation
1	Bishop Auckland	22	14	5	3	67	29	2.310	33	Qualified for the championship match
2	South Bank	22	15	3	4	61	34	1.794	33	Qualified for the championship match
3	Stockton	22	10	6	6	46	29	1.586	26	
4	Crook Town	22	10	6	6	49	40	1.225	26	
5	West Hartlepool	22	11	2	9	50	35	1.429	24	
6	Grangetown Athletic	22	9	3	10	47	53	0.887	21	
7	Darlington St Augustine's	22	8	4	10	48	52	0.923	20	
8	Scarborough	22	9	1	12	45	56	0.804	19	
9	Saltburn	22	6	6	10	33	42	0.786	18	
10	West Auckland	22	6	4	12	32	46	0.696	16	
11	York City	22	6	3	13	31	73	0.425	15	
12	Leadgate Park	22	6	1	15	30	50	0.600	13	Left the league

== Championship match ==
- 27 November 1909: Bishop Auckland 4–2 South Bank
