= 1900–01 Northern Football League =

The 1900–01 Northern Football League season was the twelfth in the history of the Northern Football League, a football competition in Northern England. The league reverted to a single division after having two divisions for the previous three seasons.

== Clubs ==
Northern League
- Season: 1900–01
- Champions: Bishop Auckland
- Matches: 110
- Goals: 386 (3.51 per match)

The league featured eight clubs which competed in the last season, along with three new clubs, promoted from last seasons's Division Two:

- Whitby
- West Hartlepool
- Scarborough

=== League table ===
Pos	Team	Pld	W	D	L	GF	GA	GR	Pts	Promotion or relegation
1	Bishop Auckland	20	12	5	3	61	22	2.773	29	
2	Darlington St Augustine's	20	10	5	5	37	25	1.480	25	
3	Darlington	20	11	2	7	55	37	1.486	24	
4	Stockton	20	8	5	7	34	25	1.360	21	
5	Crook Town	20	7	7	6	38	30	1.267	21	
6	Scarborough	20	9	3	8	25	28	0.893	21	
7	South Bank	20	9	3	8	35	45	0.778	21	
8	Thornaby Utopians	20	8	2	10	30	37	0.811	18	Left the league
9	Stockton St. John's	20	7	3	10	23	35	0.657	17	
10	West Hartlepool	20	5	5	10	31	37	0.838	15	
11	Whitby	20	2	4	14	17	65	0.262	8	Left the league
