= 1899–1900 Northern Football League =

Northern League
- Season: 1899–1900

The 1899–1900 Northern Football League season was the eleventh in the history of the Northern Football League, a football competition in Northern England.

== Division One ==
Northern League Division One
- Season: 1899–1900
- Champions: Darlington
- Matches: 72
- Goals: 243 (3.38 per match)

The division featured 7 clubs which competed in the last season, along with two new clubs, promoted from last seasons's Division Two:

- Stockton St. John's
- Thornaby Utopians

=== League table ===
Pos	Team	Pld	W	D	L	GF	GA	GR	Pts	Promotion or relegation
1	Darlington	16	12	3	1	42	16	2.625	27	
2	Stockton St. John's	16	10	3	3	32	17	1.882	23	
3	Bishop Auckland	16	9	2	5	41	21	1.952	20	
4	Darlington St Augustine's	16	7	4	5	34	27	1.259	18	
5	South Bank	16	7	3	6	18	26	0.692	17	
6	Crook Town	16	3	7	6	14	24	0.583	13	
7	Thornaby Utopians	16	3	6	7	14	25	0.560	12	
8	Tow Law	16	3	3	10	23	43	0.535	9	Left the league
9	Stockton	16	2	1	13	25	44	0.568	5	

== Division Two ==
Northern League Division Two
- Season: 1899–1900
- Champions: Whitby
- Matches: 56
- Goals: 232 (4.14 per match)

The division featured 7 clubs which competed in the last season, along with three new clubs:

- Dorman, Long & Co.
- Grangetown Athletic
- Whitby

=== League table ===
Pos	Team	Pld	W	D	L	GF	GA	GR	Pts	Promotion or relegation
1	Whitby	14	9	3	2	49	23	2.130	21	Promoted to the Northern League Division One
2	Thornaby	14	8	3	3	29	15	1.933	19	Left the league
3	Grangetown Athletic	14	7	5	2	36	24	1.500	19	Left the league
4	Loftus	14	6	2	6	23	24	0.958	14	Left the league
5	West Hartlepool	14	6	0	8	28	28	1.000	12	Promoted to the Northern League Division One
6	Scarborough	14	4	3	7	27	34	0.794	11	Promoted to the Northern League Division One
7	Stockton Vulcan	14	4	2	8	20	36	0.556	10	Left the league
8	Brotton	14	3	0	11	20	48	0.417	6	Left the league
–	Dorman, Long & Co.	0	–	–	–	–	–	—	0 (Note: Dorman, Long & Co. resigned from the league on 15 November 1899. Their record (P8 W1 D1 L6 F8 A26 P3) was expunged.)	
–	Shildon United	0	–	–	–	–	–	—	0 (Note: Shildon United resigned from the league on 13 January 1900. Their record (P5 W3 D1 L1 F13 A5 P7) was expunged.)	
