= William Chalmers (1880s footballer) =

Scottish footballer

Personal information
- Full name: William Crawford Chalmers
- Date of birth: 27 July 1860
- Place of birth: Glasgow, Scotland
- Date of death: 14 May 1940 (aged 79)
- Place of death: Rutherglen, Scotland
- Position: Goalkeeper

Senior career*
| Years | Team | Apps | (Gls) |
| 1883–1887 | Rangers | | |
| 1887–1889 | Clyde | | |
| 1890 | Birtley | | |
| 1890–1892 | Middlesbrough Ironopolis | | |
| 1892–1893 | Darwen | | |

International career
| 1885 | Scotland | 1 | (0) |
- * Club domestic league appearances and goals

William Crawford Chalmers (27 July 1860 – 14 May 1940) was a Scottish footballer who played as a goalkeeper for Rangers, Clyde, Middlesbrough Ironopolis and Scotland (gaining one cap in 1885).

== Club career ==
Chalmers played in Scotland prior to the commencement of the Scottish Football League in 1890; at Rangers, he was involved in their run to the semi-finals of the (English) FA Cup in 1886–87, the last season Scottish clubs were involved.

He moved to north-east England in his trade as a joiner around 1889 and was taken on initially by Birtley for a short spell, then by Middlesbrough Ironopolis where he won the Northern League in both seasons with the club. He was signed by Football League members Darwen in 1892 but had a knee injury which stopped him being able to play and soon led to his retirement. He returned to the Middlesbrough area and later to Scotland.

== Representative career ==
While with Clyde, Chalmers featured three times for Scotland in unofficial matches in 1889.

He also represented the Glasgow F.A. against various opposition, including against Sheffield in the annual inter-city match on four occasions; the result of his final appearance was an 8–1 win at Hampden on 19 January 1889.

== Honours ==
Clyde

- Graham Charity Cup: 1888–89

Middlesbrough Ironopolis

- Northern League: 1890–91, 1891–92
