= 1889–90 Northern Football League =

The 1889–90 Northern Football League season was the inaugural season in the history of the Northern Football League, a football competition in Northern England.

== Clubs ==
Northern League
- Season: 1889–90
- Champions: Darlington St. Augustines
- Matches: 90
- Goals: 376 (4.18 per match)

The league featured 10 clubs.

=== League table ===
| Pos | Team | Pld | W | D | L | GF | GA | GR | Pts | Promotion or relegation |
|---|---|---|---|---|---|---|---|---|---|---|
| 1 | Darlington St Augustine's | 18 | 12 | 2 | 4 | 39 | 17 | 2.294 | 26 | |
| 2 | Newcastle West End | 18 | 12 | 2 | 4 | 44 | 24 | 1.833 | 26 | |
| 3 | Stockton | 18 | 10 | 4 | 4 | 41 | 18 | 2.278 | 24 | |
| 4 | Newcastle East End | 18 | 9 | 3 | 6 | 32 | 28 | 1.143 | 21 | |
| 5 | Darlington | 18 | 7 | 6 | 5 | 46 | 20 | 2.300 | 20 | |
| 6 | Middlesbrough | 18 | 8 | 3 | 7 | 42 | 37 | 1.135 | 19 (Note: Two games involving Elswick Rangers were classified as draws: Birtley 4-1 Elswick Rangers (7 September 1889) Middlesbrough 3-2 Elswick Rangers (14 September 1889)) | |
| 7 | South Bank | 18 | 6 | 2 | 10 | 33 | 60 | 0.550 | 14 | Left the league |
| 8 | Auckland Town | 18 | 4 | 4 | 10 | 41 | 49 | 0.837 | 12 | Left the league |
| 9 | Birtley | 18 | 3 | 3 | 12 | 28 | 48 | 0.583 | 9 | Left the league |
| 10 | Elswick Rangers | 18 | 2 | 5 | 11 | 21 | 66 | 0.318 | 9 | Left the league |

Rules for classification: 1) points; 2) goal ratio.
