= 1903–04 Northern Football League =

The 1903–04 Northern Football League season was the fifteenth in the history of the Northern Football League, a football competition in Northern England.

== Clubs ==
Northern League
- Season: 1903–04
- Champions: Newcastle United A
- Matches: 156
- Goals: 608 (3.9 per match)

The league featured 13 clubs which competed in the last season, no new clubs joined the league this season.

=== League table ===
Pos	Team	Pld	W	D	L	GF	GA	GR	Pts
1	Newcastle United A	24	19	1	4	97	23	4.217	39
2	Bishop Auckland	24	17	2	5	55	27	2.037	36
3	Sunderland A	24	14	6	4	66	32	2.063	34
4	Middlesbrough A	24	12	5	7	56	32	1.750	29
5	Stockton	24	13	2	9	36	34	1.059	28
6	Darlington	24	11	3	10	48	49	0.980	25
7	Grangetown Athletic	24	10	3	11	50	49	1.020	23
8	South Bank	24	9	1	14	42	56	0.750	19
9	Darlington St Augustine's	24	8	2	14	30	58	0.517	18
10	Shildon Athletic (Note: Stockton St. John's resigned from the league on 8 October 1903. Their record (P3 W0 D0 L3 F2 A7) was transferred to Shildon Athletic.)	24	8	2	14	28	54	0.519	18
11	Scarborough	24	7	2	15	36	70	0.514	16
12	Crook Town	24	5	4	15	33	62	0.532	14
13	West Hartlepool	24	5	3	16	31	62	0.500	13
