= 1893–94 Northern Football League =

The 1893–94 Northern Football League season was the fifth in the history of the Northern Football League, a football competition in Northern England.

== Clubs ==
Northern League
- Season: 1893–94
- Champions: Middlesbrough
- Matches: 56
- Goals: 289 (5.16 per match)

The league featured 3 clubs which competed in the last season, along with five new clubs:

- South Bank
- Bishop Auckland
- Whitby
- North Skelton Rovers
- Darlington St. Augustine's

=== League table ===
Pos	Team	Pld	W	D	L	GF	GA	GR	Pts
1	Middlesbrough	14	11	1	2	51	16	3.188	23
2	Stockton	14	10	1	3	41	23	1.783	21
3	South Bank	14	8	0	6	36	34	1.059	16
4	Darlington	14	7	1	6	25	20	1.250	15
5	Bishop Auckland	14	6	0	8	41	39	1.051	12
6	Whitby	14	5	2	7	45	43	1.047	12
7	North Skelton Rovers	14	3	1	10	25	52	0.481	7
8	Darlington St Augustine's	14	3	0	11	25	62	0.403	6

Rules for classification: 1) points; 2) goal ratio.
