= 1896–97 Northern Football League =

The 1896–97 Northern Football League season was the eighth in the history of the Northern Football League, a football competition in Northern England.

== Clubs ==
Northern League
- Season: 1896–97
- Champions: Middlesbrough
- Matches: 72
- Goals: 299 (4.15 per match)

The league featured 7 clubs which competed in the last season, along with three new clubs:

- Crook Town
- Leadgate Park
- Darlington St. Augustine's

=== League table ===
Pos	Team	Pld	W	D	L	GF	GA	GR	Pts
1	Middlesbrough	16	11	4	1	36	15	2.400	26
2	Darlington	16	10	2	4	54	35	1.543	22
3	South Bank	16	10	1	5	32	25	1.280	21
4	Stockton	16	7	3	6	37	24	1.542	17
5	Tow Law	16	7	1	8	29	25	1.160	15
6	Bishop Auckland	16	6	3	7	23	34	0.676	15
7	Crook Town	16	4	2	10	35	42	0.833	10
8	Leadgate Park	16	4	1	11	27	45	0.600	9
9	Darlington St Augustine's	16	2	5	9	26	54	0.481	9
–	Saltburn Swifts	0	–	–	–	–	–	—	0 (Note: Saltburn Swifts withdrew from the league on 3 April 1897. Their record (P13 W3 D4 L6 F21 A33 P10) was expunged.)
