= James Fairbairn (footballer) =

English footballer

Personal information
- Full name: James Fairbairn
- Date of birth: Q3 1872
- Place of birth: Stockton-on-Tees, England
- Position: Forward

Senior career*
Years	Team	Apps	(Gls)
1889–1893	Stockton		
1893–1894	Middlesbrough Ironopolis	1	(0)
1894–1895	Grimsby Town	2	(2)
1895–1???	Stockton		
- * Club domestic league appearances and goals

James Fairbairn (born 1872) was an English professional footballer who played as a forward in the Football League for Middlesbrough Ironopolis and Grimsby Town.
