= 1894–95 Northern Football League =

The 1894–95 Northern Football League season was the sixth in the history of the Northern Football League, a football competition in Northern England.

== Clubs ==
Northern League
- Season: 1894–95
- Champions: Middlesbrough
- Matches: 90
- Goals: 460 (5.11 per match)

The league featured 8 clubs which competed in the last season, along with two new clubs:

- Tow Law
- Howden Rangers

=== League table ===
Pos	Team	Pld	W	D	L	GF	GA	GR	Pts	Promotion or relegation
1	Middlesbrough	18	12	5	1	58	17	3.412	29	
2	South Bank	18	11	4	3	64	23	2.783	26	
3	Tow Law	18	10	3	5	59	30	1.967	23	
4	Darlington	18	11	0	7	56	30	1.867	22	
5	Whitby	18	8	2	8	43	45	0.956	18	
6	Stockton	18	8	1	9	44	37	1.189	17	
7	Bishop Auckland	18	7	2	9	42	39	1.077	16	
8	Howden Rangers	18	6	1	11	40	56	0.714	13	
9	Darlington St Augustine's	18	5	3	10	38	66	0.576	13	Left the league
10	North Skelton Rovers	18	1	1	16	16	117	0.137	3	Left the league

Rules for classification: 1) points; 2) goal ratio.
