= 1892–93 Northern Football League =

The 1892–93 Northern Football League season was the fourth in the history of the Northern Football League, a football competition in Northern England.

== Clubs ==
Northern League
- Season: 1892–93
- Champions: Middlesbrough Ironopolis
- Matches: 30
- Goals: 122 (4.07 per match)

The league featured 6 clubs which competed in the last season, no new clubs joined the league this season.

Newcastle East End changed their name in December 1892 to Newcastle United.

=== League table ===
Pos	Team	Pld	W	D	L	GF	GA	GR	Pts	Promotion or relegation
1	Middlesbrough Ironopolis	10	9	1	0	22	6	3.667	19	Elected to the Football League Division Two
2	Newcastle United	10	5	1	4	30	19	1.579	11	Elected to the Football League Division Two
3	Sheffield United	10	4	2	4	18	16	1.125	10	Elected to the Football League Division One
4	Middlesbrough	10	4	0	6	17	17	1.000	8	
5	Stockton	10	3	1	6	24	27	0.889	7	
6	Darlington	10	2	1	7	11	37	0.297	5	

Rules for classification: 1) points; 2) goal ratio.
