= 1890–91 Northern Football League =

The 1890–91 Northern Football League season was the second in the history of the Northern Football League, a football competition in Northern England.

== Clubs ==
Northern League
- Season: 1890–91
- Champions: Middlesbrough Ironopolis
- Matches: 56
- Goals: 233 (4.16 per match)

The league featured 6 clubs which competed in the last season, along with two new clubs:

- Middlesbrough Ironopolis
- Sunderland Albion

=== League table ===
Pos	Team	Pld	W	D	L	GF	GA	GR	Pts	Promotion or relegation
1	Middlesbrough Ironopolis	14	9	2	3	37	34	1.088	20	
2	Middlesbrough	14	8	3	3	38	17	2.235	19	
3	Sunderland Albion	14	7	3	4	33	16	2.063	17	
4	Stockton	14	8	1	5	40	24	1.667	17	
5	Darlington	14	7	0	7	25	29	0.862	14	
6	Newcastle East End	14	5	2	7	25	39	0.641	12	
7	Newcastle West End	14	3	4	7	21	38	0.553	10	
8	Darlington St Augustine's	14	0	3	11	14	36	0.389	3	Left the league

Rules for classification: 1) points; 2) goal ratio.
