= 1891–92 Northern Football League =

The 1891–92 Northern Football League season was the third in the history of the Northern Football League, a football competition in Northern England.

== Clubs ==
Northern League
- Season: 1891–92
- Champions: Middlesbrough Ironopolis
- Matches: 72
- Goals: 294 (4.08 per match)

The league featured 7 clubs which competed in the last season, along with two new clubs:

- Sheffield United
- South Bank

=== League table ===
Pos	Team	Pld	W	D	L	GF	GA	GR	Pts	Promotion or relegation
1	Middlesbrough Ironopolis	16	14	1	1	49	13	3.769	29	
2	Middlesbrough	16	13	0	3	33	13	2.538	26	
3	Sheffield United	16	10	2	4	49	21	2.333	22	
4	Newcastle East End	16	9	2	5	37	20	1.850	20	
5	Stockton	16	6	2	8	31	34	0.912	14	
6	Sunderland Albion	16	5	0	11	36	38	0.947	10	Left the league
7	South Bank	16	3	2	11	21	50	0.420	8	Left the league
8	Newcastle West End	16	4	0	12	21	56	0.375	8	Left the league
9	Darlington	16	2	3	11	17	49	0.347	7	

Rules for classification: 1) points; 2) goal ratio.
