= 1895–96 Northern Football League =

The 1895–96 Northern Football League season was the seventh in the history of the Northern Football League, a football competition in Northern England.

== Clubs ==
Northern League
- Season: 1895–96
- Champions: Darlington
- Matches: 72
- Goals: 270 (3.75 per match)

The league featured 8 clubs which competed in the last season, along with one new club:

- Saltburn Swifts

Also Howden Rangers changed name to Howden-le-Wear.

=== League table ===
| Pos | Team | Pld | W | D | L | GF | GA | GR | Pts | Promotion or relegation |
|---|---|---|---|---|---|---|---|---|---|---|
| 1 | Darlington | 16 | 10 | 4 | 2 | 53 | 24 | 2.208 | 24 | |
| 2 | South Bank | 16 | 9 | 2 | 5 | 44 | 20 | 2.200 | 20 | |
| 3 | Middlesbrough | 16 | 8 | 4 | 4 | 28 | 22 | 1.273 | 20 | |
| 4 | Bishop Auckland | 16 | 7 | 3 | 6 | 42 | 32 | 1.313 | 17 | |
| 5 | Tow Law | 16 | 5 | 5 | 6 | 23 | 28 | 0.821 | 15 | |
| 6 | Whitby | 16 | 6 | 3 | 7 | 23 | 38 | 0.605 | 15 | Left the league |
| 7 | Stockton | 16 | 5 | 3 | 8 | 26 | 30 | 0.867 | 13 | |
| 8 | Howden-le-Wear | 16 | 4 | 3 | 9 | 19 | 36 | 0.528 | 11 | Left the league |
| 9 | Saltburn Swifts | 16 | 4 | 1 | 11 | 12 | 40 | 0.300 | 9 | |
