= 1989–90 Football Conference =

Football Conference
- Season: 1989–90
- Champions: Darlington (1st Football Conference title)
- Promoted to the Football League: Darlington
- Conference League Cup winners: Yeovil Town
- FA Trophy winners: Barrow
- Relegated to Level 6: Chorley, Enfield, Farnborough Town
- Matches: 462
- Goals: 1,317 (2.85 per match)
- Top goalscorer: Robbie Cooke (Kettering Town), 28
- Biggest home win: Runcorn – Enfield 9–0 (3 March 1990)
- Biggest away win: Barrow – Merthyr Tydfil 1–5 (18 April 1990); Stafford Rangers – Darlington 0–4 (21 April 1990); Telford United – Chorley 0–4 (9 December 1989); Wycombe Wanderers – Cheltenham Town 0–4 (30 December 1989); Yeovil Town – Welling United 0–4 (13 September 1989)
- Highest scoring: Runcorn – Enfield 9–0 (3 March 1990); Farnborough Town – Runcorn 6–3 (11 November 1989)
- Longest winning run: Barnet, 8 matches
- Longest unbeaten run: Darlington, 13 matches
- Longest losing run: Northwich Victoria, 6 matches
- Highest attendance: Barnet v Darlington, 5,880 (31 March 1990)
- Lowest attendance: ?
- Average attendance: 1,429 (+ 9% from previous season)

The Football Conference season of 1989–90 (known as the GM Vauxhall Conference for sponsorship reasons) was the eleventh season of the Football Conference.

== Overview ==
Darlington, relegated to the Conference from the Fourth Division a year earlier, finished the season as Conference champions and regained their Football League status at the first attempt – just as Lincoln City had done two years earlier. Coming down to the Conference from the Football League were the bottom placed Fourth Division club Colchester United.

== New teams in the league this season ==
- Barrow (promoted 1988–89)
- Darlington (relegated from the Football League 1988–89)
- Farnborough Town (promoted 1988–89)
- Merthyr Tydfil (promoted 1988–89)

== Final league table ==
Pos	Team	Pld	W	D	L	GF	GA	GD	Pts	Promotion or relegation
1	Darlington (C, P)	42	26	9	7	76	25	+51	87	Promotion to the Football League Fourth Division
2	Barnet	42	26	7	9	81	41	+40	85	
3	Runcorn	42	19	13	10	79	62	+17	70	
4	Macclesfield Town	42	17	15	10	56	41	+15	66	
5	Kettering Town	42	18	12	12	66	53	+13	66	
6	Welling United	42	18	10	14	62	50	+12	64	
7	Yeovil Town	42	17	12	13	62	54	+8	63	
8	Sutton United	42	19	6	17	68	64	+4	63	
9	Merthyr Tydfil	42	16	14	12	67	63	+4	62	
10	Wycombe Wanderers	42	17	10	15	64	56	+8	61	
11	Cheltenham Town	42	16	11	15	58	60	−2	59	
12	Telford United	42	15	13	14	56	63	−7	58	
13	Kidderminster Harriers	42	15	9	18	64	67	−3	54	
14	Barrow	42	12	16	14	51	67	−16	52	
15	Northwich Victoria	42	15	5	22	51	67	−16	50	
16	Altrincham	42	12	13	17	49	48	+1	49	
17	Stafford Rangers	42	12	12	18	50	62	−12	48	
18	Boston United	42	13	8	21	48	67	−19	47	
19	Fisher Athletic	42	13	7	22	55	78	−23	46	
20	Chorley (R)	42	13	6	23	42	67	−25	45	Relegation to the Northern Premier League Premier Division
21	Farnborough Town (R)	42	10	12	20	60	73	−13	42	Relegation to the Southern League Premier Division
22	Enfield (R)	42	10	6	26	52	89	−37	36	Relegation to the Isthmian League Premier Division

(C) Champions; (P) Promoted; (R) Relegated

== Results ==
Home \ Away	ALT	BAR	BRW	BOS	CHL	CHO	DAR	ENF	FAR	FIS	KET	KID	MAC	MER	NOR	RUN	STA	SUT	TEL	WEL	WYC	YEO
Altrincham		2–1	1–1	0–0	5–0	1–0	0–1	3–0	2–3	1–1	1–1	0–1	0–1	4–1	0–2	1–2	3–1	0–0	0–1	4–0	1–2	2–1
Barnet	1–0		1–0	1–2	4–0	5–0	0–2	2–0	4–1	4–1	4–1	2–1	0–0	4–0	1–0	2–2	1–1	4–1	2–1	1–1	2–0	1–0
Barrow	1–1	1–1		2–1	2–1	3–1	1–1	2–2	3–1	1–1	1–0	2–1	1–1	1–5	1–0	2–2	2–1	1–0	3–0	1–1	0–3	2–1
Boston United	2–3	1–2	2–1		2–1	0–1	1–3	1–0	2–2	2–0	1–2	2–3	3–0	2–2	1–3	3–2	3–0	3–1	2–2	2–1	2–0	0–1
Cheltenham Town	0–0	1–0	1–0	0–0		2–0	0–1	3–1	4–0	0–0	1–1	2–1	2–1	0–2	2–3	2–2	1–3	2–0	1–2	3–2	1–1	2–1
Chorley	2–1	1–4	0–1	0–0	0–2		0–3	2–2	1–0	2–0	2–2	1–0	0–0	1–0	1–2	0–2	1–1	3–2	1–2	4–0	1–0	3–2
Darlington	2–0	1–2	0–0	6–1	5–1	3–0		2–1	1–1	5–0	2–1	3–0	1–1	0–0	4–0	1–1	2–1	2–0	1–1	1–0	0–1	1–0
Enfield	2–1	1–3	3–0	0–1	4–2	2–0	0–3		0–0	1–2	0–3	2–1	1–1	2–0	2–0	3–2	4–1	2–3	1–2	2–3	3–5	1–1
Farnborough Town	0–0	0–1	3–0	1–0	4–0	1–3	1–0	2–3		1–1	1–1	0–1	1–2	0–1	0–1	6–3	3–3	1–3	2–1	3–1	1–1	2–4
Fisher Athletic	3–0	1–2	4–0	1–0	2–5	2–0	0–2	3–2	4–2		3–1	1–1	1–3	1–2	1–0	0–1	0–2	1–2	1–3	1–3	3–1	1–2
Kettering Town	3–0	3–2	2–0	5–0	1–0	2–1	1–3	3–2	1–1	3–0		0–2	0–0	2–0	3–0	1–1	0–0	2–0	1–1	0–1	1–0	1–0
Kidderminster Harriers	1–2	0–1	2–2	1–3	1–2	3–1	3–2	2–0	3–1	1–1	2–3		2–2	1–2	4–0	0–0	3–0	2–2	2–4	1–1	0–2	3–2
Macclesfield Town	1–0	0–1	2–1	0–0	3–0	0–0	0–0	4–0	0–0	0–1	3–1	1–2		3–2	3–1	4–0	2–2	1–1	3–0	3–2	1–0	1–2
Merthyr Tydfil	0–0	2–1	3–3	1–0	1–1	1–0	1–1	5–1	1–1	1–4	3–2	3–1	2–3		1–1	3–2	4–3	2–3	0–0	4–0	1–1	2–2
Northwich Victoria	2–3	0–2	1–0	1–0	0–0	0–1	1–0	1–0	0–2	2–1	2–2	1–2	2–0	3–1		1–1	4–3	2–3	0–2	2–3	3–0	1–4
Runcorn	0–0	2–2	4–3	3–1	2–4	3–2	2–1	9–0	3–2	4–0	3–1	2–1	2–0	1–0	2–1		3–0	1–0	3–0	0–1	2–0	1–1
Stafford Rangers	3–1	1–1	1–1	0–0	0–1	1–0	0–4	1–0	3–2	1–3	1–1	0–1	4–2	1–1	1–0	1–1		3–1	2–0	0–2	1–0	0–1
Sutton United	2–1	1–3	3–3	2–0	0–2	3–0	2–1	2–0	2–3	2–1	2–1	1–2	2–1	1–1	2–1	3–0	1–0		6–1	1–0	1–2	3–1
Telford United	1–3	1–3	3–0	4–2	0–0	0–4	0–1	1–1	4–2	3–1	1–3	1–1	1–0	1–1	2–1	2–1	0–2	1–1		0–0	4–1	1–1
Welling United	1–1	3–1	0–0	6–0	1–1	3–1	0–1	3–0	4–3	2–0	3–0	4–1	0–1	0–3	2–0	1–1	1–0	1–0	1–1		0–0	0–1
Wycombe Wanderers	1–1	1–0	4–0	1–0	0–4	4–0	0–1	1–0	1–0	6–1	2–2	3–3	1–1	1–2	3–3	5–0	2–1	3–2	1–1	1–0		1–2
Yeovil Town	0–0	3–2	2–2	2–1	1–1	2–1	0–2	3–1	0–0	2–2	0–2	3–1	0–0	4–0	1–2	1–1	0–0	3–1	1–0	0–4	4–2	

Updated to match(es) played on unknown. Source: Jack Rollin (ed.), Rothmans Football Yearbook 1990–91. Queen Anne Press, MacDonald & Co., London and Sydney, 1991.
Legend: Blue = home team win; Yellow = draw; Red = away team win.
Locations of the Football Conference teams 1989–1990
Locations of the Football Conference teams 1989–1990

== Top scorers in order of league goals ==
Rank	Player	Club	League	FA Cup	FA Trophy	League Cup	Total
1	(England) Robbie Cooke	Kettering Town	28	0	0	0	28
2	(Nigeria) Efan Ekoku	Sutton	25	0	0	0	25
3	(England) Simon Read	Farnborough Town	23	2	0	1	26
4	(England) Ian Thompson	Merthyr Tydfil	21	3	0	0	24
5	(England) John Borthwick	Darlington	19	2	0	1	22
=	(England) Mark Carter	Runcorn	19	0	2	1	22
7	(England) Mike Doherty	Runcorn	18	1	0	0	19
8	(England) Gary Bull	Barnet	17	5	0	3	25
=	(England) Andrew Clarke	Barnet	17	2	0	0	19
=	(England) Paul Furlong	Enfield	17	0	1	1	19
=	(England) Paul Gorman	Fisher Athletic	17	0	0	0	17
=	(England) Terry Robbins	Welling United	17	2	1	2	22
=	(Wales) David Webley	Merthyr Tydfil	17	2	0	0	19
14	(Scotland) Steve Burr	Macclesfield Town	16	3	2	0	21
=	(England) Kim Casey	Kidderminster Harriers	16	0	3	6	25
16	(England) Paul McKinnon	Sutton	16	1	0	3	20
=	(England) Mark West	Wycombe Wanderers	16	1	1	2	20
18	(Germany) Martin Hanchard	Northwich Victoria	14	2	0	0	16
=	(England) Mark Whitehouse	Kidderminster Harriers	14	2	3	2	21
20	(England) David Cork	Darlington	12	1	3	1	17
=	(England) Colin Cowperthwaite	Barrow	12	2	0	1	15
=	(England) Ken McKenna	Telford United	12	0	2	0	14
=	(England) Mickey Spencer	Yeovil Town	12	1	1	3	17

== Promotion and relegation ==
=== Promoted ===
- Darlington (to the Football League Fourth Division)
- Bath City (from the Southern Premier League)
- Gateshead (from the Northern Premier League)
- Slough Town (from the Isthmian League)

=== Relegated ===
- Colchester United (from the Football League Fourth Division)
- Chorley (to the Northern Premier League)
- Enfield (to the Isthmian League)
- Farnborough Town (to the Southern Premier League)
