= North Skelton Rovers F.C. =

Defunct English football club

- Full name: North Skelton Rovers Football Club
- Nicknames: Rovers, the Skeltonians
- Founded: 1884
- Dissolved: 1896
- Ground: North Skelton
- Secretary: Tom Brown

North Skelton Rovers F.C. was an association football club from North Skelton, Yorkshire, which played in the 19th century.

== History ==
The earliest record for the club is from the 1884–85 season, with one match played under the North Skelton Mines Rovers name before shortening it to North Skelton Rovers.

The club improved in the 1888–89 season to the extent that it was favoured to win the Cleveland Cup, but went down 3–2 to holders Middlesbrough in the third round after a fluke winner. It did however win the inaugural Cleveland Amateur League in 1891–92.

It moved up to more serious competition in 1893–94, joining the Northern League and entering the FA Amateur Cup. In the latter competition, after receiving a bye in the first qualifying round, it lost 4–0 in the second round to South Bank New Star. The club also struggled in League football, finishing 7th from 8 in its first season, and bottom in 1894–95, winning only four matches over the two seasons. To add insult to the injury of the latter season, the Rovers suffered the record defeat in the competition's history, going down 21–0 at South Bank in April 1895, Jack Calvey scoring ten of the goals.

The club consequently was not re-elected, and joined the Cleveland League instead for 1895–96, but matters did not improve - the club lost 11–0 to local rivals Skelton and gave up the ghost before the season's end. The Cleveland Association suspended the club after it failed to turn up to a match with Guisborough in April 1896, and no response had been received to correspondence. The club never re-emerged, although a new club of the same name started up in 1897.

== Ground ==
The club's ground never seems to have had a specific name, being referred to simply as being "at North Skelton". The club's facilities were at the Bull's Head Hotel.
