= North Eastern League =

- Founded: 1906
- First season: 1906–07
- Folded: 1964
- Country: England
- Last champions: Horden Colliery Welfare A.F.C. (2nd title)
- Most championships: Middlesbrough reserves (12 titles)

The North Eastern League was an association football league for teams in the North East of England.

The league was founded in 1906 and was initially successful, with teams defecting from the rival Northern Football Alliance to play. Although some members (such as Darlington) transferred to join the Football League Third Division North in 1921, the North Eastern League absorbed the Northern Alliance in 1925–26 and split into two divisions. The league spent nine years like this, returning to one division in 1935; clubs from the second division re-forming the Northern Football Alliance, which became a feeder to it.

As years progressed, numbers dwindled and the league initially folded in 1958 after the withdrawal of Football League clubs' reserve sides. The remaining members initially transferred to the Midland Football League before founding the Northern Counties League in 1960. The Northern Counties League was renamed the North Eastern League in 1962–63 but folded for a second time in 1964.

== Champions ==
The champions of the league were as follows:

- 1906–07 : Newcastle United Reserves
- 1907–08 : Newcastle United Reserves
- 1908–09 : Newcastle United Reserves
- 1909–10 : Spennymoor United
- 1910–11 : Newcastle United Reserves
- 1911–12 : Middlesbrough Reserves
- 1912–13 : Darlington
- 1913–14 : South Shields
- 1914–15 : South Shields
- 1915–19 : Not contested due to the First World War
- 1919–20 : Middlesbrough Reserves
- 1920–21 : Darlington
- 1921–22 : Carlisle United
- 1922–23 : Newcastle United Reserves
- 1923–24 : South Shields Reserves
- 1924–25 : Sunderland Reserves
- 1925–26 : Newcastle United Reserves
- 1926–27 : Sunderland Reserves
- 1927–28 : Sunderland Reserves
- 1928–29 : Sunderland Reserves
- 1929–30 : Sunderland Reserves
- 1930–31 : Middlesbrough Reserves
- 1931–32 : Middlesbrough Reserves
- 1932–33 : Middlesbrough Reserves
- 1933–34 : Sunderland Reserves
- 1934–35 : Middlesbrough Reserves
- 1935–36 : Blyth Spartans
- 1936–37 : Sunderland Reserves
- 1937–38 : Horden Colliery Welfare
- 1938–39 : South Shields
- 1939–46 : Not contested due to the Second World War
- 1945–46 : Spennymoor United
- 1946–47 : Middlesbrough Reserves
- 1947–48 : Sunderland Reserves
- 1948–49 : Middlesbrough Reserves
- 1949–50 : North Shields
- 1950–51 : Stockton
- 1951–52 : Middlesbrough Reserves
- 1952–53 : Sunderland Reserves
- 1953–54 : Middlesbrough Reserves
- 1954–55 : Middlesbrough Reserves
- 1955–56 : Middlesbrough Reserves
- 1956–57 : Spennymoor United
- 1957–58 : South Shields
- 1960–61 : North Shields (NCL)
- 1961–62 : Consett (NCL)
- 1962–63 : Scarborough
- 1963–64 : Horden Colliery Welfare

== Member clubs ==
During the league's existence, 82 clubs and reserve teams played in the league.

- Annfield Plain
- Ashington
- Ashington Reserves
- Bedlington United
- Birtley
- Blackhall Colliery Welfare
- Blyth Spartans
- Bradford City 'A'
- Bradford City Reserves
- Bradford Park Avenue Reserves
- Carlisle United
- Carlisle United Reserves
- Chester-le-Street Town
- Chilton Colliery Athletic
- Chopwell Institute
- Consett
- Craghead United
- Crawcrook Albion
- Crook Town
- Darlington
- Darlington Reserves
- Dipton United
- Durham City
- Durham City Reserves
- Eden Colliery Welfare
- Eppleton Colliery Welfare
- Felling Colliery
- Gateshead
- Gateshead Reserves
- Gateshead Town
- Hartlepools United
- Hartlepools United Reserves
- Hebburn Argyle
- Hexham Town
- High Fell
- Horden Colliery Welfare
- Houghton Rovers
- Huddersfield Town
- Jarrow
- Leadgate Park
- Leeds City 'A'
- Leeds City Reserves
- Mickley
- Middlesbrough Reserves
- Murton Colliery Welfare
- Newbiggin West End
- Newburn
- Newcastle City
- Newcastle East End
- Newcastle United Reserves
- North Shields
- Ouston Rovers
- Pegswood United
- Penrith
- Preston Stanley
- Redcar Albion
- Scarborough
- Scotswood
- Seaham Harbour
- Seaham White Star
- Seaton Delaval
- Shildon
- South Shields
- Spen Black & White
- Spennymoor United
- St Peters Albion
- Stakeford Albion
- Stockton
- Sunderland Reserves
- Sunderland Rovers
- Throckley Welfare
- Usworth Colliery
- Walker Celtic
- Wallsend
- Washington Colliery
- West Stanley
- West Wylam Colliery Welfare
- White-le-Head Rangers
- Whitley Bay Athletic
- Wingate Albion
- Workington
- Workington Reserves
