= Middlesbrough Ironopolis F.C. =

Former association football club in England

Middlesbrough Ironopolis
- Full name: Middlesbrough Ironopolis Football Club
- Nicknames: The Nops; The Washers
- Founded: 1889; 137 years ago
- Dissolved: 1894; 132 years ago
- Ground: Paradise Ground, Middlesbrough
- Capacity: 14,000
- 1893–94: Football League Second Division
Home colours

Middlesbrough Ironopolis Football Club was a football club based in Middlesbrough, England.

Although it was only in existence for five years, the club won three Northern League titles and two cup competitions, and once reached the FA Cup quarter-finals.

== History ==
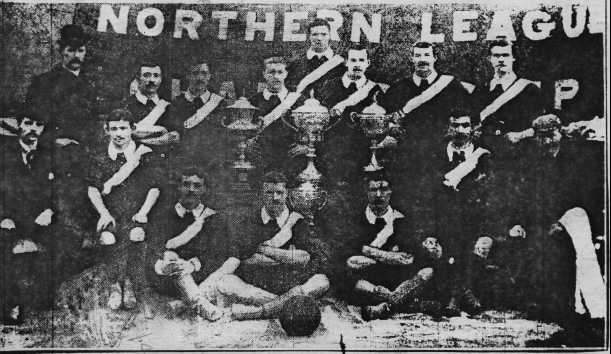
The Ironopolis team of 1892–93.

The club was formed in 1889 by some members of Middlesbrough F.C., an amateur club at the time, who wanted the town of Middlesbrough to have a professional club, as the original stayed amateur; however, once Ironopolis turned professional, Middlesbrough followed suit within a week. The team played its first ever game against Gainsborough Trinity on 14 December 1889 at home, having recruited a squad of professionals mostly from Scottish clubs, including four from Arthurlie, three from Dundee clubs Harp and Strathmore, and retaining some from Middlesbrough. The match ended in a 1–1 draw, T. Seymour scoring the new club's first goal, an equalizer just before the break.

=== League and Cup ===
Middlesbrough Ironopolis played in the Northern League from 1890 to 1893, winning three consecutive titles. In their first season, they reached the Fourth Qualifying Round of the FA Cup, losing to Darlington.

Both the Washers and Middlesbrough came to realise their only real chance of gaining promotion to the Football League was through a reunion of the two teams. On 7 May 1892, after a meeting between the two clubs, an application to join the Football League was made under the name Middlesbrough and Ironopolis Football and Athletic Club. The club received only one vote in its application to join the First Division, and did not enter the vote to join the Football League Second Division, so the two original clubs split up once more. The next season, Ironpolis had its best run in the FA Cup, losing to Preston North End in a quarter-final replay; in the original game, at the Paradise Ground, Preston played the second half with ten men due to injury, and McArthur scored a late equalizer for the home side to send the game into extra time, which could not split the sides.

Ironopolis applied to join the Second Division for the 1893–94 season, and was originally unsuccessful in the vote; however, in August 1893, Accrington resigned, and Ironpolis was invited to take its place. Competing in the league alongside them were Liverpool, Newcastle United, and Woolwich Arsenal (now known simply as Arsenal). Ironopolis finished 11th out of 15 clubs, recording wins against Small Heath (now Birmingham City), 3–0, and over Ardwick (now Manchester City) 2–0. They played in total 28 games, won 8, drew 4, lost 16, scored 37 goals, conceded 72, and finished with 20 points. The squad that season was: G. Watts; J. Elliott, Philip Bach; Thomas Seymour, Robert Chatt, R. Nicholson; J. Hill, Archibald M. Hughes, Thomas McCairns, P. Coupar, Wallace McReddie.

The club lost its stadium, the Paradise Ground, which was adjacent to Middlesbrough F.C.'s Ayresome Park, at the end of the season. Its financial position was poor, as gate receipts did not cover the cost of players' wages and the costs of travelling to fixtures in distant parts of England. In February 1894 all the professional players were served notice of the plans to liquidate the team. The club's final game was a 1–1 draw against South Bank on 30 April 1894. Ironopolis resigned from the Football League the following month and disbanded. Ironopolis and Bootle are the only two clubs to have spent a single season in the Football League.

== Seasons ==
Season	Division	P	W	D	L	F	A	Pts	Pos	FA Cup
1889–90	Middlesbrough Ironopolis played only friendly matches									
1890–91	Northern Football League	14	9	2	3	37	24	20	1st	First round
1891–92	Northern Football League	16	14	1	1	49	13	29	1st	First round
1892–93	Northern Football League	10	9	1	0	22	6	19	1st	Quarter-finals
1893–94	Football League Second Division	28	8	4	16	37	72	20	11th	Second round

== Name and colours ==
The club was formed during the late Victorian industrial boom and adopted the name "Ironopolis" (iron-city) partly to emphasise this (Middlesbrough was then a centre for iron and steel production; see Teesside Steelworks) and also to distinguish itself from the other local club, Middlesbrough F.C.

The club had three sets of colours in its brief history; initially a cardinal and green kit jersey, which had been Middlesbrough's colours in 1885–86. In 1891 it changed to cherry and white stripes (the racing colours of Alderman Weighell, who presented the club with its new shirts), and in February 1893 altered the design to cherry with a white sash, worn for the first time in an FA Cup tie with Preston North End.

== Ground ==
The club played at the Paradise Ground, a former rugby union pitch on Linthorpe Road, next to Ayresome Park; indeed part of the latter was later built over a corner of the Paradise pitch.

== Honours ==
- Northern League Division One
  - Champions: 1890–91, 1891–92, 1892–93
- FA Cup
  - Quarter-finalists: 1892–93
- Cleveland Charity Cup
  - Winners: 1889–90, 1892–93

== Sources ==
- Dave Twydell (1995). Rejected F.C. Volume 3. Yore Publications. ISBN 1-87442-726-7.
- History of Middlesbrough FC
