= Leadgate Park F.C. =

English association football club

Leadgate Park
- Full name: Leadgate Park Football Club
- Founded: c. 1889
- Dissolved: 1925
- Ground: Leadgate Park Football Enclosure
- League: North Eastern League
- 1924–25: North Eastern League, 18th
Home colours

Leadgate Park F.C. was an English association football club based in the village of Leadgate, County Durham.

== History ==
The club was founded in the late 1880s; the team was at least active in January 1889. Leadgate Park entered the FA Cup for the first time in 1892, receiving a bye in the first qualifying round in place of Sunderland Albion. However, the team was eliminated by Tow Law in the next round. The club applied for election to the Northern League in July 1895 as the number of clubs was being increased from nine to ten. However, the application was unsuccessful as Crook Town and Darlington St Augustine's were chosen to replace Howden-le-Wear. Nevertheless, Leadgate Park were accepted into the league soon afterwards, and finished eighth in the division in the 1896–97 season.

In 1899, Leadgate Park switched to the Northern Football Alliance. They played in the league for two seasons, ending each campaign in eighth place. The club was forced to return to the Northern League in 1906 when the Northern Alliance banned clubs from County Durham. Leadgate Park attained their highest league finishes in 1906–07 and 1911–12, placing fourth out of 12 teams. Competitive football was stopped in 1915 due to the outbreak of the First World War, and upon resumption of league play in 1919 Leadgate Park joined the North Eastern League. In the same season, the team reached the fifth qualifying round of the FA Cup for the first time, but were knocked out by West Stanley. The club struggled in the league over the following years, never finishing in the top half of the table. In 1925, having conceded over 100 goals in 38 matches, Leadgate Park left the North Eastern League and subsequently disbanded.

== Colours ==
The club colours were maroon and white, in stripes.

== Ground ==
The club played on Leadgate Park, to which the club added a cinder athletics track in 1918.

== Records ==
- FA Cup
  - Fifth Qualifying Round 1919–20, 1921–22, 1923–24
- FA Amateur Cup
  - Semi-finals 1896–97

== Former players ==
1. Players that have played/managed in the Football League or any foreign equivalent to this level (i.e. fully professional league).
2. Players with full international caps.
3. Players that hold a club record or have captained the club.

- (England) George Bertram
- (England) Cyril Hunter
