= Newcastle East End F.C. =

Newcastle East End
- Full name: Stanley FC, Newcastle East End Football Club, Newcastle United F.C in 1892
- Founded: 1881
- Ground: Stanley Street, Byker, Union Road, Byker, Brinkburn Street, Byker, Heaton Junction/Chillingham Road, Heaton (1882-1892), before moving to St. James Park in 1892
- Capacity: approx 10,000 (Heaton Junction/Chillingham Road)
- 1891–92: Northern League
Home colours

Newcastle East End Football Club was an English football club which briefly played in the Northern League and the FA Cup in the late 19th century. Their entire history was played out during the Victorian era in Newcastle upon Tyne until eventually adopting the name Newcastle United following the collapse of Newcastle West End, their rivals, in 1892, leaving them the only football team in Newcastle.

== History ==
The club was formed in November 1881 after local cricket side Stanley Cricket Club decided to form a footballing section. Based in the South Byker inner city part of Newcastle, the club played their first game, winning 5–0 against Elswick Leather Works reserves.

=== Name change from Stanley FC to Newcastle East End ===
Due to being confused with a side from Stanley, County Durham, the club's name was changed to Newcastle East End Football Club in October 1882. The first game played under the new name was against Hamsterley Rangers, taking place on 7 October 1882, it ended 1–0 to East End. Early players for the club included the likes of William Findlay, Alex White and Tom Watson. Originally East End played their games at Stanley Street in Byker but moved a short distance to Chillingham Road, on the border between Byker and Heaton during 1884, near to a railway network. The club became founding members of the Northern League.

East End team in 1890.

East End was the first club from Newcastle to become professional, which in 1889 was a huge step for a Northern football club. They also became a limited company in March 1890, with capital of 1,000 pounds in ten shilling notes. During the three seasons in which East End participated in the Northern League, starting in 1889–90, they finished fourth, sixth and fourth again respectively; Middlesbrough Ironopolis were the dominant side in the league at the time, winning two of those seasons' titles. East End applied to join the First Division of the Football League in 1892; along with Ironopolis they polled only one vote. Both were asked to apply for the Second Division and both declined.

The club entered into the FA Cup and participated against Sunderland Albion in a qualifying round, eventually losing 4–2. Their second attempt a year later fared slightly better as the First Round was reached in a match which they lost to Nottingham Forest.

=== Name change from Newcastle East End to Newcastle United ===
Bitter local rivals from across the city, Newcastle West End, who also competed in the Northern League, had fallen into serious financial difficulties. Newcastle West End eventually collapsed in 1892 which then led some players and backroom staff to join with East End. Newcastle East End then acquired St James' Park, as it was superior to Chillingham Road.

In December 1892, the club decided to adopt a new name for supporters as they now only had one team to support in Newcastle. Suggested names included Newcastle Rangers, Newcastle City and Newcastle United. The latter name was decided upon signifying that Newcastle now only have one team and it will unite all supporters together from their previous rivals. The name change was accepted by The Football Association on 22 December, but the name change was not legally constituted as Newcastle United Football Club Co. Ltd. until 6 September 1895.

=== Community club ===
In 1995, Newcastle East End was reformed as a community football club based at Stotts Road in Walkergate, with over 30 teams including boys, girls, men's and women's teams.

== Colours ==
Newcastle East End's second kit

The original and most common colours of the club was red shirts, with white shorts and black socks. Despite the fact that this was the kit they first wore and indeed the kit originally passed on to Newcastle United after the merger, a second kit has gained more attention in some sources.

The second kit was a brief change in colours during the mid-1880s, this kit was made up of a red and white striped shirt, with navy shorts and black socks. It is considered highly ironic in the History of Newcastle United, because the club's main rivals Sunderland used the same colours.

== See also ==
- Category:Newcastle East End F.C. players
