= Stockton St John's F.C. =

UK association football club

Stockton St John's F.C. was an association football club based in the town of Stockton-on-Tees, England. The team joined the second division of the Northern League in 1898 following the resignation of Leadgate Exiles, and won the title in their first season. Despite finishing as runners-up to Darlington in the First Division in 1899–1900, Stockton St John's subsequently struggled in the league and finished bottom of the table in 1902. Three matches into the 1903–04 campaign, the club resigned from the Northern League and were replaced by Shildon Athletic. Stockton St John's participated in the FA Cup on five occasions between 1899 and 1904, but never progressed past the first qualifying round.
