= West Hartlepool F.C. =

West Hartlepool
- Full name: West Hartlepool Amateur Football & Athletic Company Limited
- Founded: 1898
- Dissolved: 1910
- Ground: Park Road
- 1909–10: Northern League, 8th
Home colours

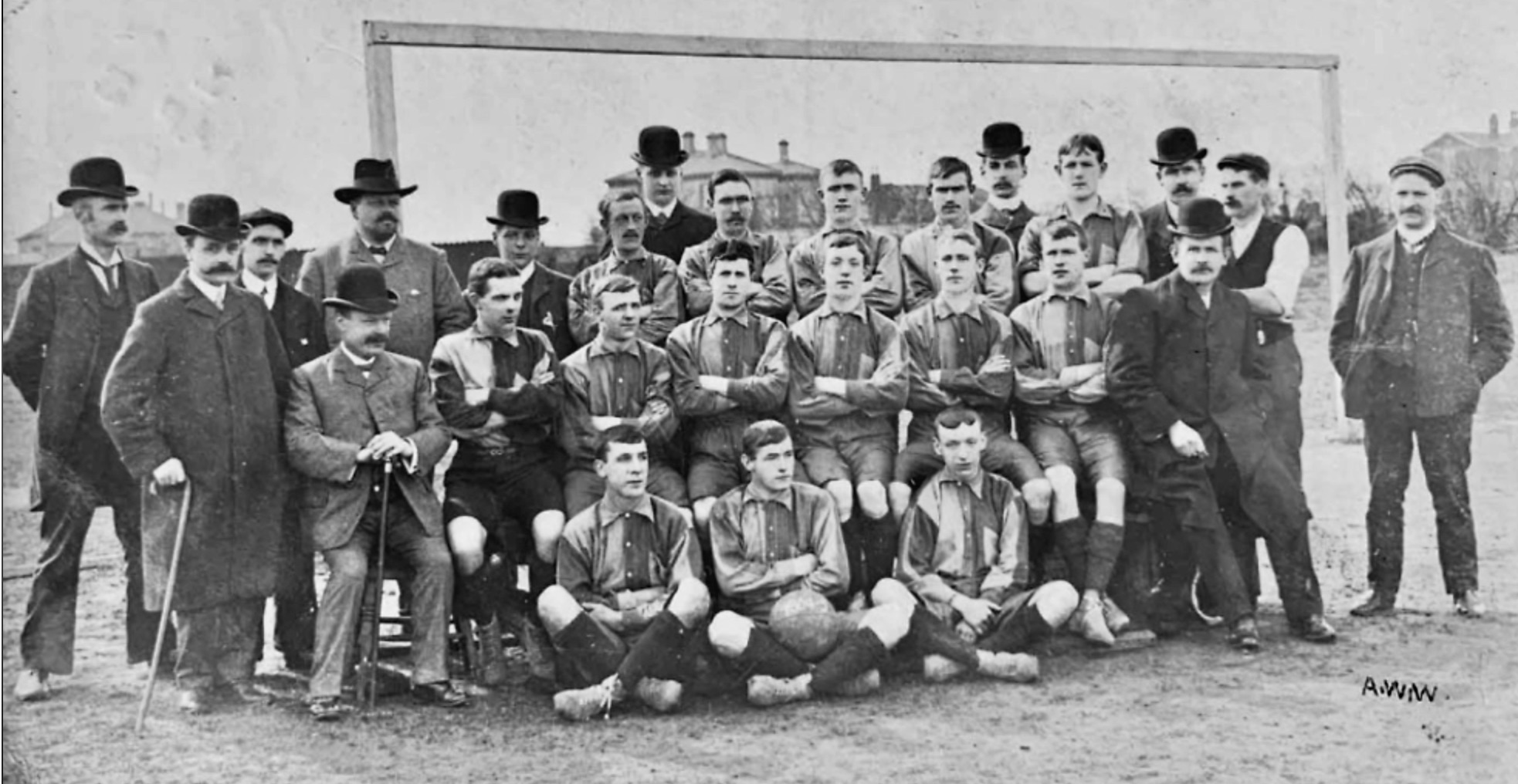
West Hartlepool F.C., 1904–05

West Hartlepool Amateur Football & Athletic Company Limited was an English football club from Hartlepool, County Durham.

== History ==
A West Hartlepool club was formed in 1880, and nearly disbanded in 1889; it seems to have collapsed after a grandstand was destroyed in a storm in 1890 as there are no records for the club afterwards.

The instant club was formed in 1898, out of the ashes of the West Hartlepool N.E.R. (North-Eastern Railway) club side, which had recently disbanded.

They joined to the Northern League in 1898, playing in Division Two for two seasons before that division was disbanded, and then admitted to the single division in 1900. They remained in that company until their demise, their highest finishing position being 4th in the 1907–08 season. They competed for a number of years in the qualifying rounds of the FA Cup, with their highlight being a run to the Fourth Qualifying Round in the 1905–06 season, when they were eliminated by Barrow. West Hartlepool took the lead against the Zaggers, Trechmann scoring from a corner, after half-an-hour, but Barrow equalized almost immediately; with the score at 2–1 late in the game, Barrow took advantage of West Hartlepool's desperate attacks to score twice from breakaways.

The club's greatest achievement occurred on 8 April 1905 when the club won the FA Amateur Cup beating Clapton, 3–2 at Shepherd's Bush, London; West Hartlepool took a two goal lead into the break, with goals from Trechmann and D. Hegarty (the latter from a quick free-kick while the London side was not ready), and Trechmann added a third after Clapton goalkeeper Wilding lost sight of a long shot. Two late Clapton goals made the score look more respectable but the game finished with the northern club on the attack.

The club folded in June 1910. All the club's assets and liabilities were taken over by Hartlepools United.

== Colours ==
The original club wore chocolate and white vertical striped shirts from 1888. By 1902 the revived club was wearing plain white shirts and by 1904 it had adopted amber and black halves, with black shorts and socks.

== Ground ==
The club played at the Park Road Ground.
