= South Bank F.C. =

Coordinates: 54°34′05.69″N 1°09′37.48″W

South Bank FC
- Full name: South Bank Football Club
- Nickname: The Bankers
- Short name: South Bank
- Founded: 1868
- Dissolved: 1999
- Ground: Normanby Road Ground
Home colours

South Bank F.C. were a football club based near Middlesbrough, England. The club claimed to have been founded in 1868, which would have made them one of the oldest football clubs in England.

== Early history ==
South Bank's claim to have been founded in 1868 would make them the oldest club in the North-East and one of the oldest in England. While the date is recognised by most football historians, there is little contemporary evidence to support it.

The club initially played friendly matches with other clubs in the Middlesbrough area. In 1885 they amalgamated with South Bank Eribus and South Bank Excelsior and in 1886 incorporated South Bank Black Watch. It was at this time that the club left their Cricket Field home, which had been criticised due to the narrowness of the playing field, to move to the Paradise Field, a site which was later to be covered by the sinter plant at British Steel’s Cleveland Works.

The 'Bankers' remained at Paradise field for a period of three years during which time they entered the FA Cup for the first time. Their first game in the competition came on 30 October 1886 when they lost 0–4 to Gainsborough Trinity in the First Round. The following year they entertained Newcastle East End and triumphed 3–2 following extra time. They then succumbed to Middlesbrough (1–4) in the Second Round.

The club became founder members of the Northern League in 1889–90 and moved to a new ground at Normanby Road. They left the Northern League after this inaugural season, returning for another season in 1891–92 before applying to join the Teesside League in 1892–93 becoming champions, . [NB: South Bank were included in the fixture list produced for the 1892-93 season of the Northern League and reports exist that they actually completed their first fixture against Middlesbrough on 3 September 1892 at their (Middlesbrough's) Linthorpe Road ground. They were soundly beaten 5-0. There are however other reports that suggest this was a "club match", a friendly in today's terms, as opposed to a Northern League match. In any event it does not count within the Northern League statistics.]

Switching again back to the Northern League in 1893–94, they also competed in the first FA Amateur Cup. They established themselves in the Northern League, finishing runners-up in 1894–95, 1895–96 and 1906–07 before finally winning their first title in 1907–08 after a play-off against Darlington St.Augustines. They then lost a title play-off the following season against Bishop Auckland. They also achieved the largest win ever recorded in the Northern League on 29 April 1895 when they hammered North Skelton Rovers 21–0.

The following years leading up to the start of World War I were one of the club’s most successful periods. Four more runners-up spots in the league (1909–10, 1910–11, 1911–12, 1913–14) were matched by success at national level, finishing runners-up in the FA Amateur Cup of 1909–10 (losing 2–1 to RMLI Gosport) before winning the same trophy in 1912–13, beating Oxford City 1–0 in a replay. A new grandstand, luxurious at the time, was also built in 1909. The structure remained largely unchanged until demolished in 1993 after fire damage.

== Inter-War Period ==
A second Northern League title, which had eluded the club before hostilities, was secured in 1919–20 after a three way play-off with Crook Town and Bishop Auckland.

The 1921–22 season proved to be one of the most eventful. Leading 2–1 in the FA Amateur Cup Final against local rivals Bishop Auckland with one two minutes remaining, the Bankers conceded a late equaliser and then had a last minute penalty saved. Bishop went on to win 5–2. Consolation came for South Bank in securing their third Northern League title in the same season.

The following two decades resulted in two more runners-up spots in 1926–27 and 1935–36, as well as the Bankers an appearance in the First Round Proper of the FA Cup in 1925–26 when they were beaten by Stockton 4–1. They also reached the semi-finals of the FA Amateur Cup in 1926–27, losing to 2–1 to Barking Town.

== Post WWII ==
The Northern League resumed operation in 1945–46 with South Bank finishing runners-up. They then won the Northern League Cup for the first time in 1947–48.

The following decades were a lean period for the club. With little success in the Northern League, crowds began to dwindle at Normanby Road. A Northern League Cup win in 1955/56 was the solitary high spot.

In 1980, the club played their first match at home under floodlights and improved their league fortunes, finishing third on three occasion in the early 1980s. The Bankers also enjoyed some cup success, just missing out on reaching the First Round Proper of the FA Cup in 1985–86 and reaching the Quarter Finals of the FA Trophy, losing 2–0 to Enfield in front of a crowd of over 3,000.

== Decline, Closure and Later Clubs ==
Disaster struck the club in 1991, when an arson attack gutted the main stand and dressing rooms. Worse was to come at the turn of the year as the thriving social club at Normanby Road was destroyed in a further arson attack. With football now completely out of the question at Normanby Road and with no revenue from the social club, it became increasingly difficult to keep the stricken club afloat and meet the players expenses. The club managed to fulfil their fixtures due to help from Middlesbrough FC, Guisborough Town FC and the Northern League.

In 1992–93, the club were unable to play at Normanby Road, playing their home fixtures first at Guisborough and then Darlington Road (Ferryhill Athletic). They finished bottom of the league with their last game in the Northern League a 0–7 trouncing by champions Whitby Town.

In the summer of 1993 the Football Association announced that the club would not be allowed to enter either the F.A. Cup or F.A. Trophy as the ground was lacking in basic facilities and was considered to be in a dangerous condition. At the same time the Northern League reluctantly suspended the club’s membership, having done their utmost to keep the club in the competition.

The club name was kept alive and in 1995 they joined Wearside League Division Two, playing their games at Mannion Park. The club were unable to attract the hard core of support which South Bank had enjoyed, mainly due to the fact that they were unable to secure a permanent base within the town. Following the sale of Mannion Park the club again found themselves without a base and resigned from the league in 1999, spelling the end for arguably the sixth oldest football league club in the country.

A team bearing the name South Bank FC now play in the Stockton Sunday League.

Even more recently another South Bank side was formed under “South Bank Albion FC” whom play in the Langbaurgh League in Middlesbrough.

== Record ==
Legend:	Northern League – Division One; Northern League – Single Division	Wearside League; Teesside League
Key:		+ Season abandoned due to WWII – 1939–40; X Not in a league; | Founded – 1868

== Honours ==
South Bank's honours
Competition	Position	Season
Northern Football League	Champions	1907–08, 1919–20, 1921–22
Northern Football League	Runners-up	1894–95, 1895–96, 1906–07, 1908–09, 1909–10, 1910–11, 1911–12, 1913–14, 1926–27, 1935–36, 1945–46
FA Amateur Cup	Champions	1912–13
FA Amateur Cup	Runners-up	1909–10, 1921–22
FA Cup	Second Round	1887–88
FA Cup	First Round	1886–87, 1887–88,1925–26
FA Trophy	Quarter-finals	1985–86
Northern League Cup	Champions	1947–48, 1955–56
Northern League Cup	Runners-up	1981–82
