= Darlington St Augustine's F.C. =

Former association football club in England

Darlington St Augustine's
- Full name: Darlington St Augustine's Football Club
- Nickname: the Saints
- Founded: 1882
- Dissolved: 1916; 110 years ago
- Ground: Chesnut Grove
- Capacity: 5,000
- President: Very Rev. Canon James Rooney
20th century colours

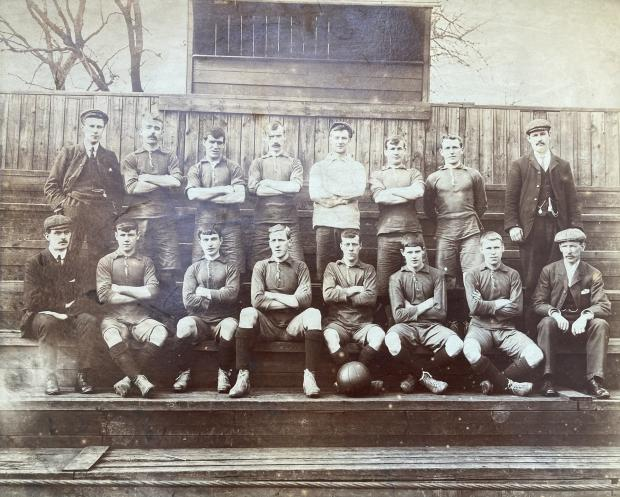
Darlington St. Augustine's F.C., 1904–05. Back row from the left: JW Gannon (honorary secretary), T Rodgers (captain), G Adams, P Murphy, H Sheardown, I Rule, R Guthrie, W Heslin (trainer). Front: J Prior, E Hanlon, W Birbeck, J Shackleton, J Payne, J Walton, F Seal, W Gannon (honorary treasurer).

Darlington St Augustine's Football Club was a football club based in Darlington, England. It was most notable for being the winner of the first Northern Football League in 1889–90.

== History ==
The club was founded in 1882 by William Nolli, a Scotsman who had moved to Darlington to run the Old Dun Cow pub. Nolli claimed to have played with Hibernian and, unable to find an association club in Darlington, he recruited players from St Augustine's Church in order to form a side. Nolli himself playing at centre-half.

Within a year the rival Darlington F.C. had been founded, and the two clubs met in the Cleveland Cup final in 1886–87; although the Saints were narrow favourites, Darlington won 4–1 in a replay after a 0–0 draw, both games taking place at Middlesbrough Ironopolis' Linthorpe Ground; the Saints being handicapped in the replay by losing its favourite forward O'Hara on the eve of the match, and conceding no less than three own goals. St Augustine's drew much support from the Irish Catholic community in the Albert Hill area near the club's Chestnut Grove ground.

However the Saints would win the competition in 1888–89, coming from behind against Redcar & Coatham to win 5–1 at Stockton, Nolli (the club captain) being carried shoulder-high on the club's return to Darlington.

Despite this success, it was not considered a big enough side to be invited in March 1889 to play in the first Northern League; it was however made first reserve, and the Saints were duly elected as members in June. The club took full advantage by importing a number of players from Scotland, and won the league on goal average from Newcastle West End. The club crucially beat West End 4–1 at home in its final match, but West End only needed a point at Darlington in its final match to take the title. However West End only turned up with 10 men, and Darlington won 3–0, to hand the Saints the title.

It was the high point for the Saints, as the expense of running an 18-match competition prevented the chances of earning money from fixtures against clubs from wider afield, and there was some doubt as to its continuing. With financial problems, the Saints had to release many players, including goalkeeper Shaw, whose replacement Sweenie was not of the appropriate standard. By the end of the season the club's attendances had gone from in the thousands to 6-700 and with still half-a-dozen matches remaining the club had run out of money - wages were £301 against gate income of £320 - and players agreed to play out the season for free. Having finished bottom of the League, the club was forced to apply for re-election, but was voted out in favour of Sheffield United.

The club re-joined the Northern League in 1893, but by this time the chief clubs had joined the Football League, and the competition had lost its primacy. It had a brief Indian summer at the turn of the century, coming 2nd in the League in 1900–01, four points behind champions Bishop Auckland after the 20 games, but 1 point ahead of Darlington; the club also won the Cleveland Cup the same season by beating the Middlesbrough A side 2–0 in the final, successfully retaining the trophy with a 1–0 final win over the same side. 1901–02 also saw the club's best run in the FA Cup, reaching the fifth and final qualifying round, but the Saints lost 4–2 at Bishop Auckland.

The Saints finished bottom of the Northern League in 1914–15, and although it played charity matches in 1915–16, it did not re-emerge after the First World War. The final reported match was a 3–1 defeat at Darlington in a match raising funds for the injured former Saints player Will Heslop.

== Colours ==
The club normally played in green and white, having plain white jerseys until December 1889, when it adopted green and white stripes. By 1890 however the club was wearing plain green.

== Ground ==
The club's ground was Chesnut Grove, off Chesnut Street, and for its first decade the club used the facilities at the Bridge Hotel.

== Honours ==
Darlington St Augustine's honours
Competition	Titles	Season
Northern League Division One	1	1889-90
Cleveland Cup	3	1888-89, 1900-01, 1901-02
