= Darlington F.C. =

Association football club in Darlington, England

- Full name: Darlington Football Club
- Nicknames: The Quakers; Darlo
- Founded: 1883; 143 years ago
- Ground: Blackwell Meadows
- Capacity: 3,300
- Coordinates: 54°30′34″N 1°33′51″W
- Major shareholder: Darlington FC Supporters Group
- Manager: Craig Elliott
- League: National League North
- 2025–26: National League North, 9th of 24
- Website: darlingtonfc.co.uk
Home colours	Away colours	Third colours

Darlington Football Club is an association football club based in Darlington, County Durham, England. As of the 2025–26 season, the team competes in the National League North, at the sixth level of English football.

The club was founded in 1883, and played its matches at Feethams. The club originally played in regionally organised leagues, and was one of the founding members of the Northern League in 1889. They were first admitted to the Football League when the Third Division North was formed in 1921. They won the Third Division North title in 1925, and their 15th place in the Second Division in 1926 remains their highest ever league finish. After their admission to the League, they spent most of their history in the bottom tier. They won the Third Division North Cup in 1934, their first victory in nationally organised cup competition. They reached the last 16 of the FA Cup twice, and the quarter-final of the League Cup once, in 1968. In the early 1990s they won successive titles, in the Conference National in 1990 and the Fourth Division in 1991. In 2011 they won the FA Trophy, defeating Mansfield Town 1–0 at Wembley Stadium.

Darlington moved to the all-seater, 25,000-capacity Darlington Arena in 2003. The cost of the stadium was a major factor in driving the club into administration in 2003, 2009, and 2012. As the fan owned club was unable to agree a creditors voluntary agreement it was expelled from the Football Association (FA). A new club was immediately formed and moved to Blackwell Meadows stadium but the FA ruled that, as a new club, it must have a different playing name from the expelled club. The name chosen was Darlington 1883, and that club was placed in the Northern League Division One, the ninth tier of English football, for the 2012–13 season. They won three promotions in four seasons before the FA approved their request to change to the traditional Darlington FC name.

The club have at times worn strips of black and white shirts, black shorts and black and white socks. The club's crest depicts Locomotion No. 1, referring to the town's railway history; as well as a stylised Quaker hat, referring to the religious movement that had a historic influence on the town, and which was the source of the team's nickname, the Quakers. The club's main rivals historically are Hartlepool United.

== History ==
=== Founding and pre-war ===
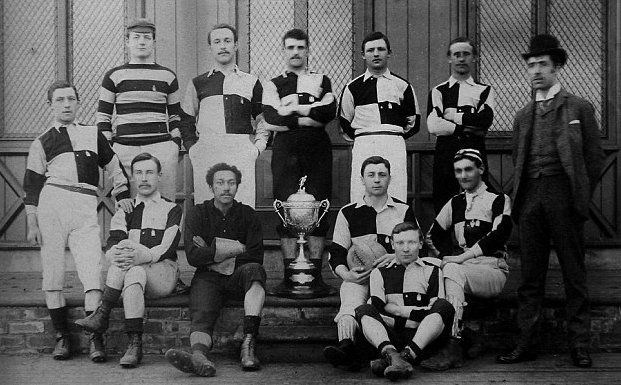
The 1887 team posing with the Cleveland Challenge Cup

In July 1883, a meeting was called in Darlington Grammar School to address concerns that so few Darlington-based football clubs were entering the major competition in the region, the Durham Challenge Cup. The meeting agreed with the view expressed by the Darlington & Stockton Times newspaper, that there was "no club, urban or rural, sufficiently powerful to worthily represent Darlington", decided to form a new club, and elected one Charles Samuel Craven, a local engineer, as secretary. Darlington Football Club duly entered the Durham Challenge Cup, reached the final in their first season, and won the trophy in 1885. The following season Darlington entered the FA Cup for the first time, only to lose 8–0 to Grimsby Town. Craven was instrumental in the formation of the Northern League in 1889. Darlington were one of the founder members, and went on to win the league title in 1896 and 1900; they reached the semi-final of the FA Amateur Cup in the same two seasons.

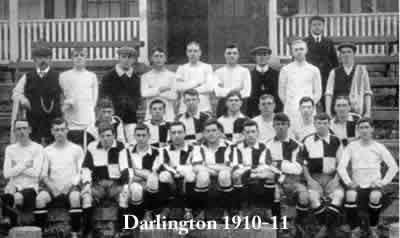
The Darlington team of the 1910–11 season, who reached the last 16 of the FA Cup

The club turned professional in 1908 and joined the North Eastern League. The 1910–11 season saw Darlington reach the last 16 of the FA Cup, progressing through five qualifying rounds to lose to Swindon Town in the third round proper, and two years later they won the North Eastern League. Ground improvements begun before the First World War left the club in financial difficulty during it; the chairman of Darlington Forge Albion financed the completion of the East Stand and cleared the debts, allowing them to continue to compete. When competitive football resumed after the war, Darlington finished second in the North Eastern League, and were champions for a second time the following year. This victory was well timed, as it coincided with the formation of the Northern Section of the Football League's Third Division, which Darlington were invited to join.

Their first season in the Third Division was a successful one and they ended up in second place. Three years later, in 1924–25, they were champions and won promotion to the Football League Second Division. The 15th-place finish in 1926 remains Darlington's best League performance, but they were relegated back to the Third Division in 1927, where they remained until the Second World War put an end to competitive football. They came as high as third in 1929–30, but twice had to apply for re-election to the League, in 1932–33 and 1936–37, after finishing in last place in the section. In 1934, they enjoyed their first success in a nationally organised cup competition, defeating Stockport County 4–3 at Old Trafford to win the Football League Third Division North Cup, and reached the final again two years later, this time losing 2–1 at home to Chester.

=== Post-war ===
Chart of Darlington's yearly table positions in the football league.

Soon after the Football Association gave permission for competitive matches to be played under floodlights, Darlington beat Carlisle United 3–1 in the first floodlit FA Cup match between Football League clubs, a replay held at St James' Park, Newcastle United's ground, in November 1955.^{[B]} The 1957–58 season saw the club equal their previous best FA Cup run, reaching the last 16 by defeating Chelsea, Football League champions only three years earlier, in the fourth round. After letting slip a three-goal lead at Stamford Bridge, Darlington won the replay 4–1 after extra time, described as "a most meritorious win, earned by a combination of sound tactics and an enthusiasm that Chelsea never equalled" by The Times' correspondent, who felt it "surprising that extra time was necessary, for Darlington always seemed to have the match well in hand". In the League, Darlington's fourth place in 1948–49 was their only top-half finish in the first twelve seasons after the war, and when the regional sections of the Third Division were merged, they were allocated to the new Fourth Division.

The Supporters' Club raised £20,000 to pay for a roof at one end of the Feethams ground and for floodlights, which were first used on 19 September 1960. Later that night, the West Stand burned down due to an electrical fault. Darlington's attendance record, of 21,023 against Bolton Wanderers in the League Cup fourth round, was set two months later. Under the management of Lol Morgan, they won promotion to the Third Division in 1966. A crowd of 16,000 watched the draw against Torquay United on the last day of the season which ensured they finished as runners-up, but they were relegated the following year.

Darlington reached the quarter-finals of the 1968 League Cup; drawn away to Brian Clough's Derby County, they took the lead, only to lose 5–4. During the 1970s the club had to apply for re-election to the League five times, and by 1982 they were facing a financial crisis which they survived thanks to fundraising efforts in the town. Three years later they won promotion by finishing third in the league under manager Cyril Knowles. Darlington spent two seasons in the Third Division; the 13th-place finish in 1986 was the highest position they achieved in the Football League since the introduction of the four-division structure in 1958, but they were relegated the following season.

Though Brian Little's appointment as manager in February 1989 was too late to stave off relegation to the Conference, he went on to lead them to successive promotions. An immediate return to the Football League as Conference champions preceded the Fourth Division title in 1990–91, but Little's departure for Leicester City was followed by relegation and a succession of short-term managers. They came close to a return to the Third Division via the play-offs in 1996; on their first visit to Wembley, against Plymouth Argyle, they were beaten by a Ronnie Mauge goal.

=== New stadium, administration and decline ===
The 1999–2000 season, the first under George Reynolds' chairmanship, was marked by Darlington becoming the first team to lose an FA Cup tie and still qualify for the next round. Manchester United's involvement in the FIFA Club World Championship meant they did not enter the FA Cup. To decide who took their place, a "lucky losers" draw was held from the 20 teams knocked out in the second round; Darlington were selected, and lost their third-round tie 2–1 to Aston Villa at Villa Park. Their second Wembley appearance came later that season, facing Peterborough United in the play-off final after automatic promotion had seemed certain earlier in the season. After a 3–0 aggregate semi-final win over Hartlepool United, Quakers missed numerous chances and were again undone by a single goal, this time from Andy Clarke.

In 2002, Darlington made unsuccessful approaches to sign international stars Paul Gascoigne and Faustino Asprilla, and moved into their new stadium, named the Reynolds Arena, in summer 2003. Reynolds had paid the club's debts when he took over, but the cost of the stadium, partly financed with high-interest loans and built without realistic expectation of filling it, drove the club into administration six months later. Reynolds resigned as a director in January 2004 with the club under threat of imminent closure. A benefit match, featuring footballers such as Gascoigne, Bryan Robson and Kenny Dalglish, played in front of a crowd of over 14,000, raised £100,000 to help ensure survival in the short term. Despite the off-field problems, David Hodgson, in his third spell as manager, and his players produced some fine performances as the team avoided relegation.

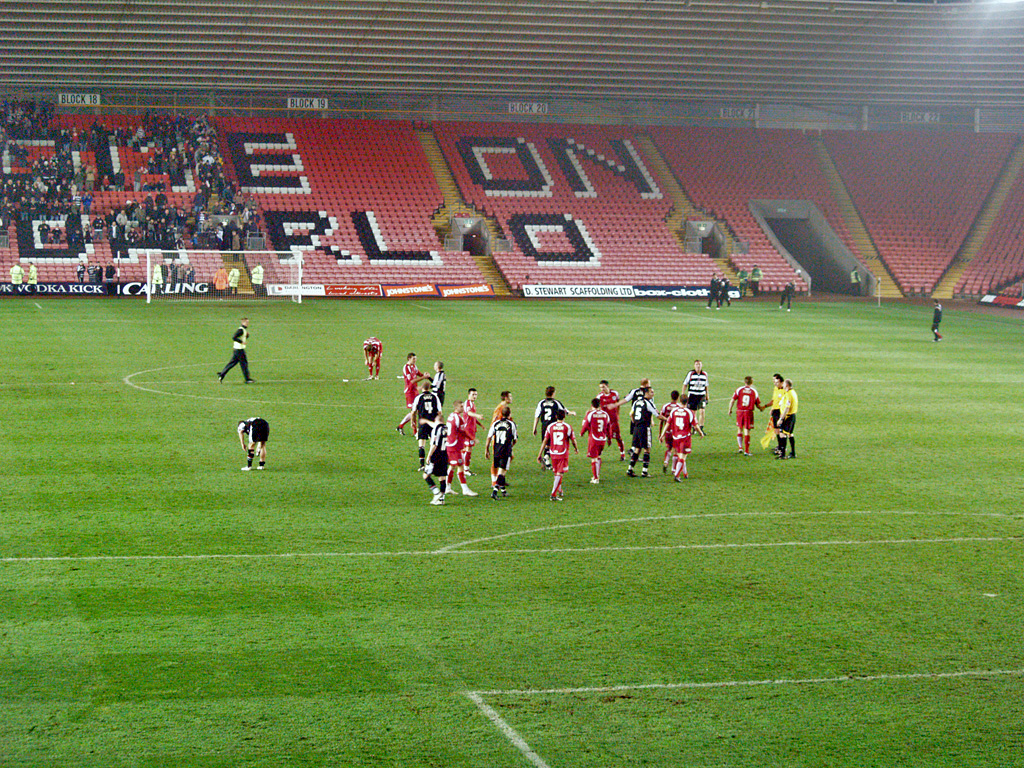
Darlington playing Bury at the Darlington Arena in 2008

At the end of the season, Reynolds was obliged to hand over control to the Sterling Consortium to bring the club out of administration, Stewart Davies taking over as chairman. He and his staff adopted a fan-friendly approach, in contrast to the abrasive Reynolds, before in 2006, the club was sold to property developer George Houghton. For four consecutive seasons, under Hodgson, sacked in 2006, and then under successor Dave Penney, the Quakers finished in the top half of the table, reaching the play-off semi-final in 2008 only to lose to Rochdale on penalties. In February 2009, Darlington again went into administration, triggering an automatic 10-point deduction, without which they would have again reached the play-offs. Fundraising efforts kept the club going, but when no buyer was found for the club by a May deadline, the administrators made the majority of the first-team squad available for transfer and cut staff numbers to a minimum. On 20 May, Houghton returned to the club as chairman, appointed former Middlesbrough boss Colin Todd as manager, and brokered an agreement which led to the club coming out of administration and ownership passing to local businessman Raj Singh and enabling it to compete in the 2009–10 season without any points deduction. Todd left the club after losing seven of his first nine games and was replaced by former Republic of Ireland manager Steve Staunton, who only won four of 23 league games.

The club were eventually relegated to the Conference, and suffered more managerial turmoil during the summer when Simon Davey and successor Ryan Kidd both left within 11 days, to leave Mark Cooper in charge. He led the club to victory in the 2011 FA Trophy final at Wembley Stadium, defeating Mansfield Town 1–0 with a goal from Chris Senior in the last minute of extra time. Following a succession of poor performances at the start of the 2011–12 season, Cooper and his assistant Richard Dryden were sacked by the club in October. A little more than two months later, Singh placed the club into administration for the third time in less than a decade. A number of players were released and allowed to join other clubs for nominal fees in January before interim manager Craig Liddle and the remaining playing staff had their contracts terminated by Darlington's administrator. Two days later, the club was spared from liquidation after a last-minute injection of funding by supporters' groups. Enough funds were raised for Darlington to complete the season, but relegation was confirmed with three matches remaining.

=== Darlington 1883 ===
On 3 May 2012, the club was taken over by DFC 1883 Ltd with the intention of moving into community ownership. Because it failed to agree a creditors voluntary agreement, the club was expelled from the Football Association and was eventually wound up in the High Court. DFC 1883 Limited immediately formed a new club. Because the club proposed to play at a ground without the required grading for the Northern Premier League, the new club was placed in the Northern League Division One, by the Football Association. Martin Gray was appointed manager. An appeal against the new club not being treated as a continuation of the old club was rejected, confirming that the club was to be treated as a new club and would not be able to play under the name Darlington F.C. The new owners opted to name the new club Darlington 1883.

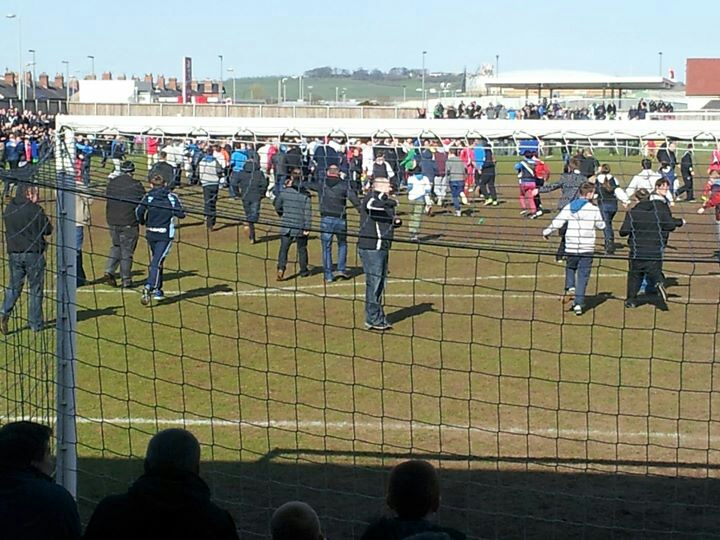
Fans celebrate winning the 2013 Northern League title.

In February 2013, the club became 100% fan- and community-owned after the Darlington Football Club Community Interest Company (DFC CIC), representing around 800 members, had taken a 52% stake; the Supporters' Club held 15%, and individual fans held the remaining 33%. The new ownership were committed to paying off debts incurred under the previous owners; five months later, the club made a final payment on tax owed to HMRC.

On the pitch, Darlington were crowned Northern League Division One champions in 2012–13 with a club record haul of 122 points, having scored 145 goals in the process, thus gaining promotion to the Northern Premier League Division One North for the 2013–14 season. The season saw them finish as Division One North runners-up, before losing in the play-off semi-final to Ramsbottom United. In 2014–15, Darlington again finished second, and this time won the play-off final 2–0 against Bamber Bridge, earning promotion to the Premier Division. Darlington clinched their second successive promotion and the 2015–16 Northern Premier League Premier Division title on 21 April 2016 after beating Whitby Town 7–1. However, the club were unable to make it three promotions in a row, as despite finishing in the National League North play-off positions in 2016–17, ground grading issues prevented their participation.

=== Return to Darlington F.C. ===
In April 2017, the FA approved the club's request to change to the traditional name of Darlington F.C. for the 2017–18 season.

In the summer of 2017, it was reported through the club website that work had begun on a new playing area and a new seated stand, following the addition of more fundraising.

In October 2017, Gray resigned as manager to join rivals York City. He was succeeded by former player Tommy Wright, with another former player Alan White as his assistant. Wright led Darlington to a 12th and 16th-place finish respectively during the two seasons he was in charge before leaving by mutual consent in April 2019.

In May 2019, Wright was succeeded by another former player Alun Armstrong who joined from Blyth Spartans. Assistant Manager Alan White also left the club in July 2019 before replacing him with another former player Darren Holloway a week later.

In Armstrong's first season as manager, Darlington qualified for the first round of the FA Cup for the first time since they were reformed in 2012, including wins all away from home against Trafford, Leamington and Tamworth. In the first round, they played away again against League Two side Walsall and the match finished 2–2 with midfielder Joe Wheatley getting a 97th-minute equaliser to get a replay at Blackwell Meadows. Darlington did then lose the first round replay 1–0 in a record crowd since their first game at Blackwell Meadows with the attendance of 3,106, which was shown in front of the BT Sport cameras.

After a 10th-place finish in the 2019–20 season, the 2020-21 campaign was disrupted by the COVID-19 pandemic. Darlington finished 13th in 2021–22 and after being top of the league in January 2023, fell to 10th in the 2022–23 season. The poor run continued into the 2023–24 season, and Armstrong was dismissed on 6 September 2023. Josh Gowling replaced Armstrong, but only lasted three months before he was dismissed after only winning three out of sixteen games during his tenure and left the club second bottom in the league. Steve Watson replaced Gowling and brought Terry Mitchell from Workington with him as his assistant manager. They guided Darlington to a 16th-place finish after being 9 points adrift from safety at one stage of the season and winning 10 out of the last 15 games of the season, completing "The Great Escape".

== Colours and badge ==
Kit suppliers and sponsors
From	Manufacturer	Shirt sponsor
1975	Umbro	
1976	Litesome	
1977	Bukta	
1979	Le Coq Sportif	
1982	Le Coq Sportif	DONN
1984	Hummel	McEwan's
1987	Hobott	United
1988	Hobott	I-S-L
1989	Jack Hatfield	I-S-L
1991	Jack Hatfield	Hutchison Telecom
1995	ICIS	Orange
1996	ICIS	Soccerdome
1997	On Time Sportswear	Darlington Building Society
1998	Biemme	Darlington Building Society
1999	Xara	Darlington Building Society
2007	Vandanel	Darlington Building Society
2009	Erreà	Darlington Building Society
2010	Erreà	The Morritt
2011	Erreà	Lakeside Care Homes

In 1888, Darlington's kit consisted of a shirt with black and white vertical stripes, black shorts and black socks. Apart from a period between the 1910s and 1936, when blue shorts were worn, the basic colours of the home kit have remained black and white. The shirt design has varied, from the 1888 vertical stripes, through hoops, plain white, and back to hoops again in the 1990s. Sponsors' names have appeared on Darlington's shirts since the 1980s. A table of kit manufacturers (since the 1970s) and shirt sponsors appears on the right.

The club badge is in the form of a shield, divided diagonally into two parts; the smaller section, to the upper right, is in the club's home colour of white, the larger is red, their traditional away colour. In the white section is a stylised Quaker hat, emblematic of the major role played by the Religious Society of Friends (Quakers) in the history of the town. The larger section depicts George Stephenson's Locomotion No 1, the steam locomotive that hauled the first train on the Stockton and Darlington Railway in 1825, representing the importance of the railway industry to the area. Across the bottom of the shield is a ribbon bearing the club's nickname, The Quakers, and the whole rests on a bed of oak leaves, symbolic of strength and endurance.

== Stadiums ==
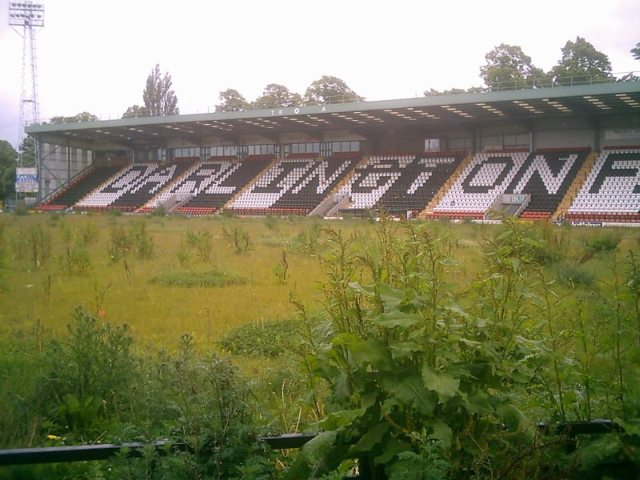
Feethams, derelict in 2005

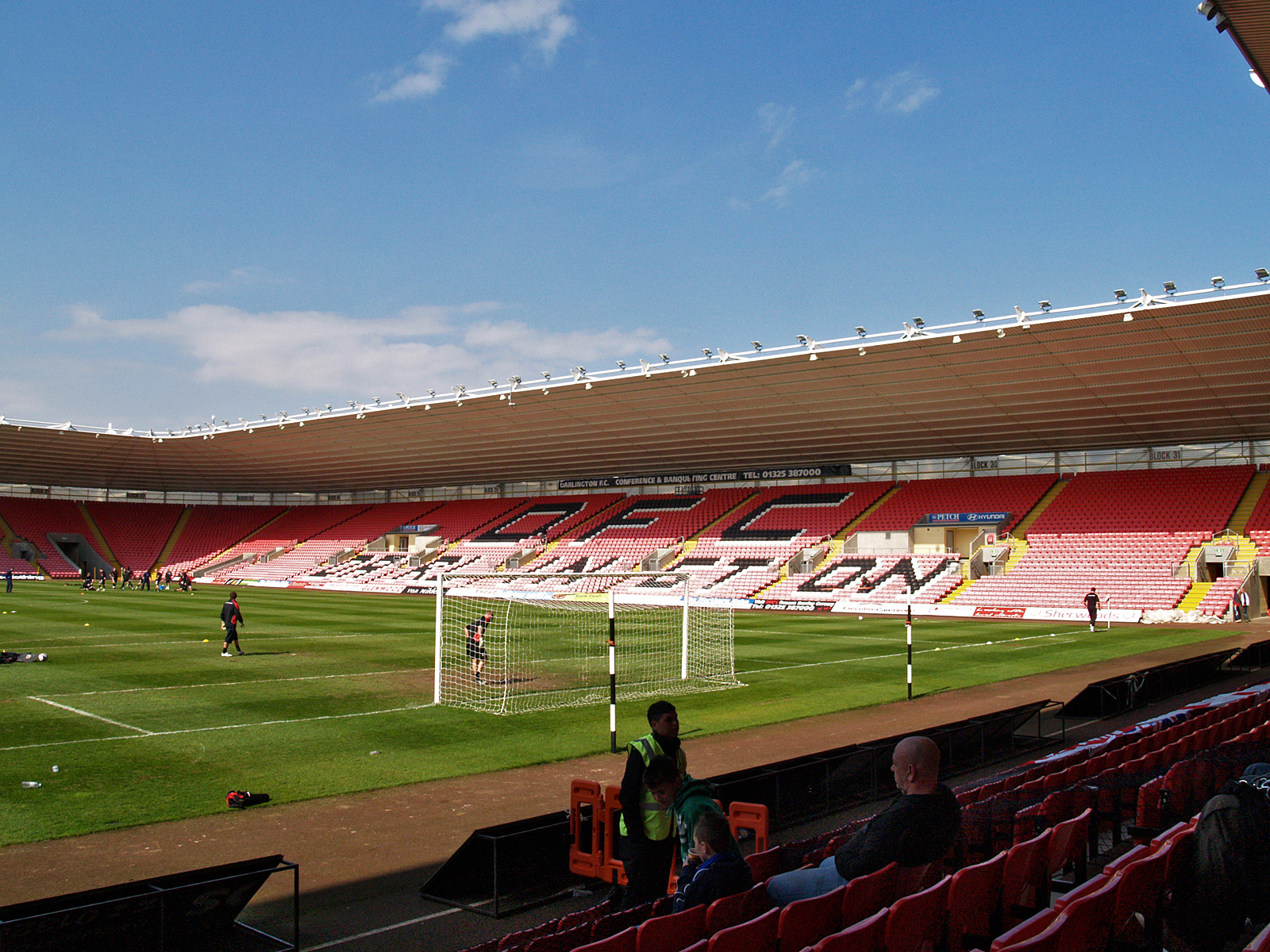
The Darlington Arena in April 2009

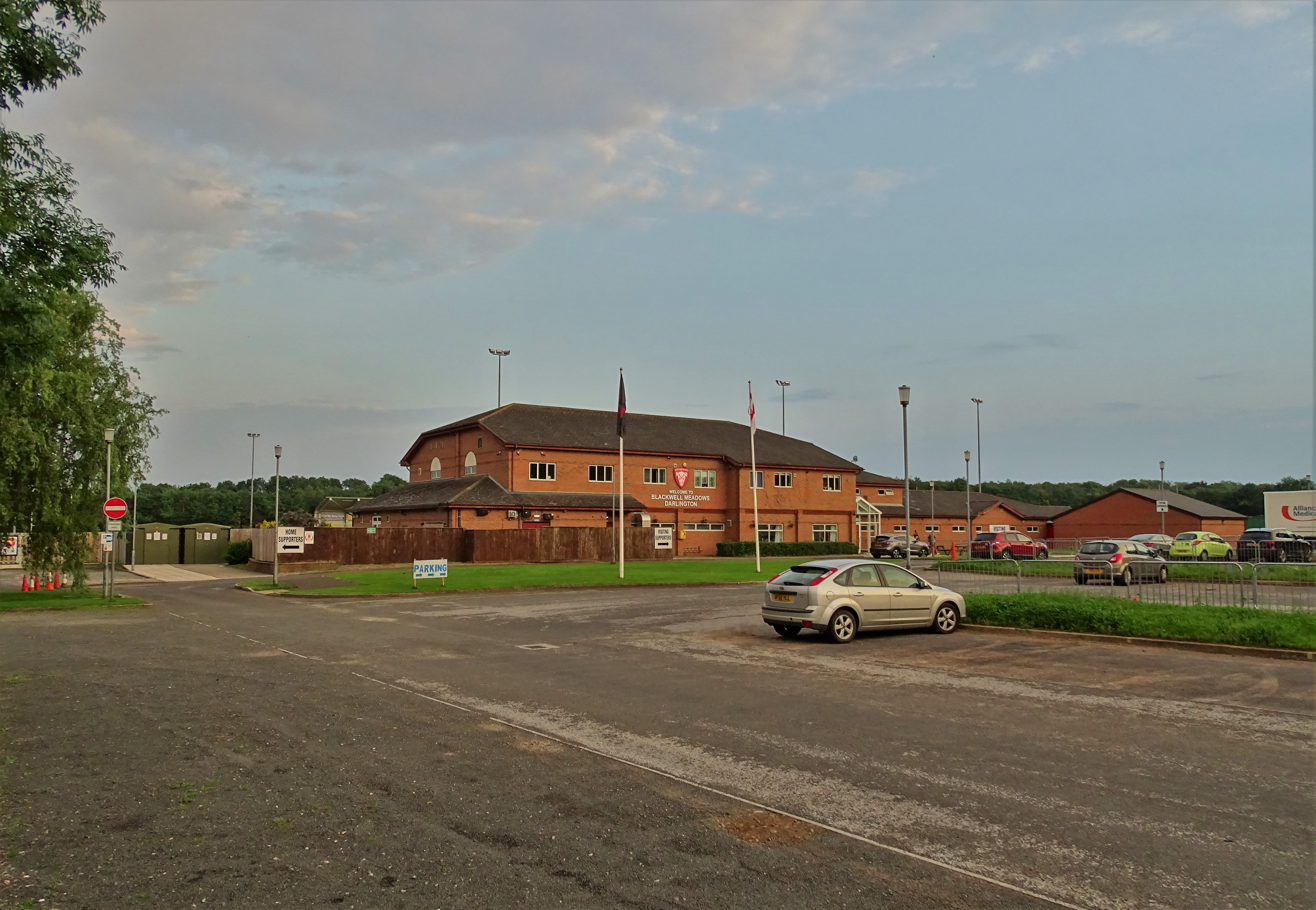
Blackwell Meadows in 2019

Feethams was originally used by Darlington Cricket Club, but began to be used for football in the 1860s. Darlington F.C. began playing there when they formed in 1883. With growing crowd figures, the ground was expanded with the construction of the West stand at the turn of the century and the Polam Lane end in 1905. In 1913, a pair of towers were built at the entrance to the ground, and in 1920, offices and changing rooms were built underneath the East stand. Floodlights were installed in September 1960, but after their first use an electrical fault gutted the West stand in a fire, prompting its rebuilding. In 1997, the East stand was demolished and rebuilt as an all-seater stand, but its cost had a major negative effect on the club's finances. George Reynolds came in to the club, paid its debts and initiated construction of a new stadium. The last match played at Feethams was a 2–2 draw with Leyton Orient on 3 May 2003. Following the closure of the ground, the floodlights were sold to Workington A.F.C. and the stadium demolished. A housing estate was planned for the cleared site. The 25,000-seat Reynolds Arena was opened in 2003, at a cost of £18 million. The first match at the new stadium was a 2–0 loss to Kidderminster Harriers on 16 August 2003. The attendance of 11,600 still stands as a record for the ground. After Reynolds left the club, the stadium had a variety of sponsored names, but it is generally known as the Darlington Arena. The capacity was restricted to just 10,000 because of county and local planning regulations,^{[A]} but attendances rarely reached 3,000, and in 2011, the club's receivers put it up for sale. In May 2012, Darlington confirmed they would no longer play at the Arena. Later that year, it was bought by Darlington Mowden Park R.F.C.

Before the stadium was sold, there was interest by the local council to build a new railway station next to the stadium as part of the Tees Valley Metro scheme to improve public access to D.F.C matches. The scheme also included better services to Darlington and Saltburn, new rollingstock, as well as possible street running to Darlington town centre. However, the rail scheme was eventually abandoned by 2011, and unlike other proposed stations in the project, Darlington Arena never received a station.

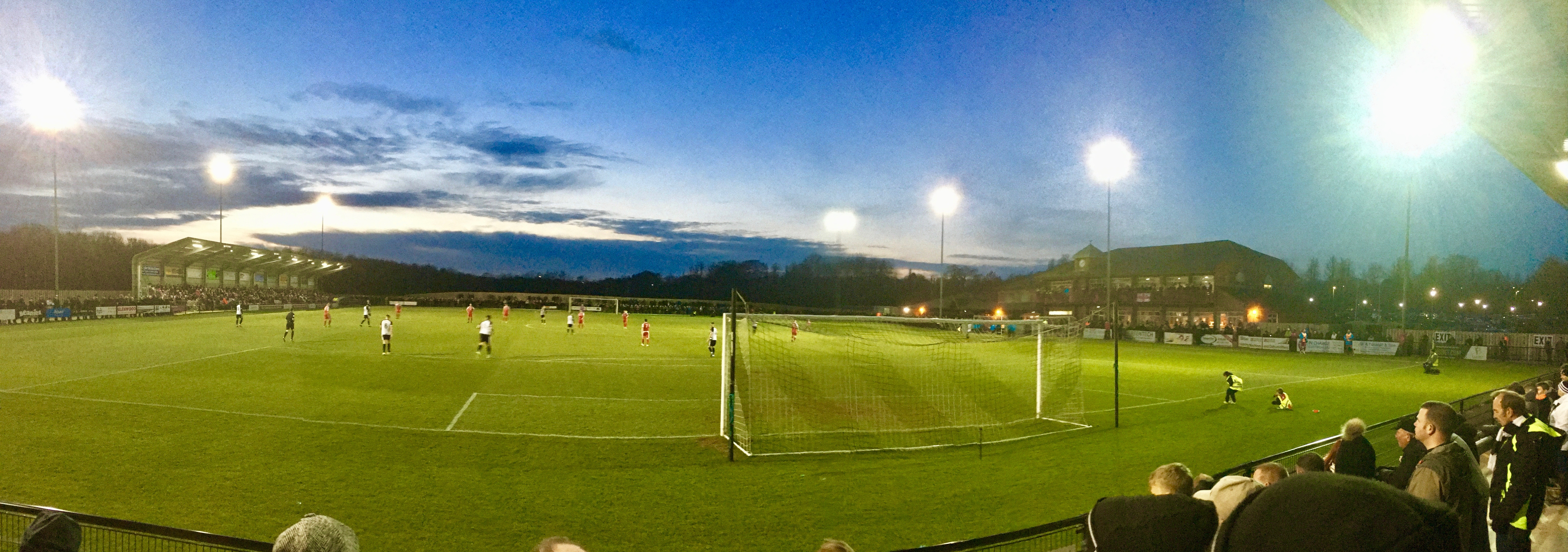
Blackwell Meadows, Darlington. Photograph taken from the Tinshed stand, during Darlington - Ashton United. Photograph taken 29/12/18. Darlington won the game 2–1.

Plans had originally been laid down to groundshare with Shildon, but arrangements were eventually for Darlington to share Bishop Auckland's Heritage Park ground from the start of the 2012/13 season. In December 2013, it was confirmed that a deal had been reached in principle for the football team to share Darlington RFC's ground at Blackwell Meadows ground, and thus return to the town of Darlington. In March 2016, it was confirmed that Darlington aimed to relocate by the start of the 2016/17 season, with expansion plans in place to increase the capacity to 3,000, as required for promotion to the National League. In the event, they played their first match at Blackwell Meadows on 26 December 2016, a 3–2 National League North win against FC Halifax Town in front of 3,000 spectators. Darlington expanded the seated stand at Blackwell Meadows to seat 588 in 2018, after a successful funding drive by their fans, allowing for the club to be promoted to the National League. This was built following the 2016–17 season, where Darlington finished the season in the playoff, but were disqualified from playing due to the inadequate number of seats at Blackwell Meadows. The club continues to explore further ways to improve Blackwell Meadows, including a stand at the currently empty west end of the ground.

As of 2025, Darlington FC are attempting to lock down a site for a new ground, so they can enjoy increased revenue and continue to kick on.

== Supporters and rivalries ==
Darlington's supporters consider Hartlepool United their main rivals. The feeling is reciprocated: in a 2008 survey, 95% of supporters of both clubs named the other as their bitterest rivals. They have fierce competition each time they come up against each other. The clubs, based 25 miles (40 km) apart, had met 147 times in the Football League, as of 2009–10, of which Hartlepool won 60 to Darlington's 57. The meeting between the two clubs in 2007 attracted a crowd of 10,121 to the Darlington Arena, the largest attendance for that League fixture for 50 years, though the average League attendance at the stadium declined from over 5,000 in its opening season to 2,744 in 2009–10.

In the 2012–13 season, Darlington's first season as a renamed club, its main rivals were Spennymoor Town owing to the hotly contested title for the Northern League. Spennymoor Town had won the league for the three previous years, but had not applied for promotion until the 2012–13 season when Darlington entered the league. Spennymoor Town were the only club to contend with Darlington for the title towards the end of the season. To a lesser extent, landlords Bishop Auckland were also rivals owing to their shared home ground. In the 2014–15 season, Darlington once again locked horns with Spennymoor Town after they achieved promotion from the Northern League in 2014. Again, they contested Darlington for promotion in a semi-final playoff match that Darlington won 3–2. The rivalry with Spennymoor was re-ignited in 2017–18 when Spennymoor booked their place in the National League North, with the first game ending all square 1–1 at Blackwell Meadows on 28 August 2017.

The team's mascots included Mr Q, "a flat-looking cartoon man with a very big hat", Darlo Dog, a Dalmatian who was once ejected from the ground for climbing on the advertising boards in front of television cameras, and a panda named Feethams. Fanzines included Mission Impossible, first published in the early 1990s, and Where's The Money Gone, whose teenage editor, along with the editor of the Darlo Uncovered website, were among several supporters banned from the ground by chairman George Reynolds for criticising the running of the club. Since 2013, a fan-run internet radio station, Darlo Fans Radio, has provided commentary on Darlington matches both home and away.

Darlington had an official supporters' club and an away supporters group, known as Darlington Away Far Travelling Supporters (DAFTS), who represented Darlington supporters from places elsewhere in the country. A supporters' trust was founded in 2002; it established a Disabled Supporters Group, tried to maintain a working relationship between club and supporters, and, together with the Darlington Camera Club, staged a "Farewell to Feethams" exhibition in celebration of the club's longtime home. Together with the supporters' club, the trust was actively involved in fund-raising particularly during the club's periods of administration.

== Players ==
=== Current squad ===
As of 21 November 2026

Note: Flags indicate national team as defined under FIFA eligibility rules; some limited exceptions apply. Players may hold more than one non-FIFA nationality.

No.	Pos.	Nation	Player
1	GK	IRL	Bobby Jones
2	DF	ENG	Ben Hedley
3	DF	WAL	Scott Barrow
4	MF	ENG	Tom Platt
5	DF	ENG	Toby Lees
6	DF	ENG	Max Kilsby
7	MF	ENG	Max Howells
8	MF	ENG	Will Hatfield
9	FW	ENG	Mark Beck
10	MF	ENG	Ellis Stanton
11	FW	ENG	Dylan Stephenson
12	DF	ENG	Luke Bell (on loan from Sunderland)

No.	Pos.	Nation	Player
13	GK	ENG	Liam Mason
15	MF	ENG	Brad Walker
16	MF	ENG	Jacob Render (on loan from Leeds United)
18	MF	ENG	Sam Hetherington
21	FW	SKN	Jacob Hazel (on loan from Chester)
22	DF	ENG	Ciaran Thompson
23	DF	ENG	Dylan Wilkinson
25	FW	ENG	Aidan Rutledge
27	MF	ENG	Tom Henson
29	MF	NIR	Paddy McLaughlin
45	GK	ENG	Shea Connor (on loan from Middlesbrough)
—	DF	ENG	Haydn Hollis

=== Out on loan ===
Note: Flags indicate national team as defined under FIFA eligibility rules; some limited exceptions apply. Players may hold more than one non-FIFA nationality.

No.	Pos.	Nation	Player

== Staff ==
As of 21 November 2026

=== Boardroom ===
Position	Name
Chairman / CEO	David Johnston
Director / Company secretary	Jonathan Jowett
Director	John Vickerman
Director	Chris Stockdale
Director	Darlington 1883 Supporters Society Limited (Jon Saddington)

=== Football ===
Position	Name
Manager	Craig Elliott
First Team Coach	Ryan Toulson
Player-Coach	Haydn Hollis
Physiotherapist	Nathan Liddle
S&C Coach and Physiotherapist	Luke Roberts
Goalkeeping Coach	Steven Rodden
First Team Analyst	Michael Evans
Kit Manager	Gary Smith
Assistant Kit Manager	Zak Dunne

== Reserve team ==
In October 2016, it was announced that Horden Colliery Welfare would move 30 miles to Darlington to become the reserve team of Darlington; they will change their name to Darlington 1883 Reserves and play on the 4G surface at Eastbourne Sports Complex. Horden chairman Norman Stephens said "If the move had not have happened, Horden would have been dead by Xmas". Stephens and some of the playing staff were retained by Darlington who took Horden's place in the Wearside League. They played their first game under the new name on 6 October in a 1–0 away defeat to Boldon C.A.

In June 2024, Darlington announced that they would be forming an Under 23s team. The team would be a continuation of Grant Cuthbertson and John Walters' U18s team, that won 3 successive county cups, and would be entering the Wearside League Division Three. Numerous players completed the step up between the teams during the 2024–25 season, including Matthew Kirokiro and Will Maddison

== Honours ==
Honours achieved by Darlington since their foundation in 1883 include the following:

League
Competition		Position	Season
Football League	Third Division North (level 3)	Champions	1924–25
Football League	Third Division North (level 3)	Runners-up	1921–22
Football League	Fourth Division (level 4)	Champions	1990–91
Football League	Fourth Division (level 4)	Runners-up	1965–66
Football League	Fourth Division (level 4)	Promoted	1984–85
Football Conference (level 5)		Champions	1989–90
Northern Premier League	Premier Division (level 7)	Champions	2015–16
Northern Premier League	Division One North (level 8)	Runners-up and play-off winners	2014–15
Northern Premier League	Division One North (level 8)	Runners-up	2013–14
Northern League		Champions	1895–96, 1899–1900, 2012–13
Northern League		Runners-up	1896–97, 1898–99
North Eastern League		Champions	1912–13, 1920–21
North Eastern League		Runners-up	1919–20

Cup
Competition	Position	Season
FA Trophy	Champions	2010–11
Football League Third Division North Cup	Champions	1933-34
Football League Third Division North Cup	Runners-up	1935-36
Durham Challenge Cup	Champions	1884–85, 1890–91, 1892–93, 1896–97, 1919–20, 1999–2000

== Records ==
Darlington's highest league finish was fifteenth in the Football League Second Division, during the 1925–26 season. The club's best performance in the FA Cup has been two appearances in the last 16 of the competition. This first was in 1910–11, when they lost to Swindon Town in the third round. The second was in the 1957–58 season, when they beat Chelsea 4–1 in a replay to reach the fifth round, in which they lost 6–1 to Wolverhampton Wanderers. The club's best League Cup performance was reaching the quarter-final in the 1967–68 season.

The Quakers' biggest home win was a 13–1 defeat of Scarborough in the FA Cup on 24 October 1891. Their best away win in the Football League was on 22 October 1921, when they beat Durham City 7–3 in the Third Division North. They achieved 7–1 wins in the Northern League Division One against Billingham Town in October 2012 and Hebburn Town in February 2013, and in the Northern Premier League against Whitby Town in April 2016.

The player with the most league appearances for Darlington is Ron Greener with 439 between 1955 and 1967. He made a total of 490 senior appearances for the club. Alan Walsh scored a club-record 87 league goals between 1978 and 1984, and scored 100 goals for Darlington overall. The most league goals scored for the club by a single player in a season is 39, by David Brown in the 1924–25 season. Franz Burgmeier has the most senior international appearances while a Darlington player, with seven caps for Liechtenstein in the 2008–09 season.

=== Dream team ===
As part of the 2003 "Farewell to Feethams" celebrations, a competition in the club programme selected the following all-time "Dream Team": Mark Prudhoe, Ron Greener, Craig Liddle, Kevan Smith, John Peverell, Andy Toman, David McLean, Alan Sproates, Alan Walsh, Marco Gabbiadini and Colin Sinclair. Gabbiadini, scorer of 53 goals in his two seasons at Darlington, was voted greatest ever player.

== Notes ==
A. The Darlington Arena was built to hold 25,000 seated spectators, yet a condition was imposed at the planning stage that "at no time should the owner of the property admit or permit the admission of more than 10,000 people to the new stadium". Capacity was for a time restricted to 6,000 for weekend events and 4,500 for midweek events unless prior written permission was granted to exceed those limits.

B. Though not the first FA Cup match to be played under lights, as the club history suggests: a preliminary round replay between Kidderminster Harriers and Brierley Hill Alliance took place under floodlights on 14 September 1955, some two months before Darlington's match against Carlisle United.
