= 1925–26 Northern Football League =

The 1925–26 Northern Football League season was the 33rd in the history of the Northern Football League, a football competition in Northern England.

== Clubs ==
Northern League
- Season: 1925–26
- Champions: Willington
- Matches: 182
- Goals: 772 (4.24 per match)

The league featured 14 clubs which competed in the last season, no new clubs joined the league this season.

=== League table ===
Pos	Team	Pld	W	D	L	GF	GA	GR	Pts	Promotion or relegation
1	Willington	26	19	3	4	84	44	1.909	41	
2	Stockton	26	17	2	7	79	39	2.026	36	
3	Esh Winning	26	17	2	7	76	41	1.854	36	
4	Ferryhill Athletic	26	14	4	8	62	42	1.476	32	
5	Bishop Auckland	26	13	5	8	64	50	1.280	31	
6	Cockfield	26	13	3	10	59	51	1.157	29	
7	Tow Law Town	26	11	4	11	58	54	1.074	26	
8	Crook Town	26	10	5	11	48	48	1.000	25	
9	South Bank	26	10	4	12	37	47	0.787	24	
10	Langley Park	26	10	4	12	40	53	0.755	24	
11	Scarborough	26	10	2	14	53	72	0.736	22	Left the league
12	Stanley United	26	5	5	16	49	61	0.803	15	
13	Loftus Albion	26	3	7	16	27	87	0.310	13	
14	Eston United	26	3	4	19	36	83	0.434	10	

Rules for classification: 1) points; 2) goal ratio.
