= 1927–28 Northern Football League =

The 1927–28 Northern Football League season was the 35th in the history of the Northern Football League, a football competition in Northern England.

== Clubs ==
Northern League
- Season: 1927–28
- Champions: Chilton Colliery Recreation Athletic
- Matches: 156
- Goals: 741 (4.75 per match)

The league featured 13 clubs which competed in the last season, along with one new club:

- Chilton Colliery Recreation Athletic

=== League table ===
Pos	Team	Pld	W	D	L	GF	GA	GR	Pts
1	Chilton Colliery Recreation Athletic	24	16	5	3	71	35	2.029	37
2	Whitby United	24	14	4	6	63	58	1.086	32
3	Stockton	24	13	4	7	62	42	1.476	30
4	Cockfield	24	10	8	6	50	40	1.250	28
5	Willington	24	11	3	10	78	57	1.368	25
6	Esh Winning	24	10	4	10	58	58	1.000	24
7	South Bank	24	8	7	9	60	63	0.952	23
8	Tow Law Town	24	10	2	12	58	53	1.094	22
9	Ferryhill Athletic	24	7	5	12	52	73	0.712	19
10	Stanley United	24	7	4	13	57	71	0.803	18
11	Loftus Albion	24	7	4	13	48	64	0.750	18
12	Bishop Auckland	24	7	4	13	43	65	0.662	18
13	Langley Park	24	7	4	13	41	62	0.661	18
–	Crook Town	0	–	–	–	–	–	—	0 (Note: Crook Town were suspended by the Durham County Football Association on 7 January 1928. Their record (P13 W11 D0 L2 F49 A14 P22) was expunged on 9 February 1928.)

Rules for classification: 1) points; 2) goal ratio.
