= 1929–30 Northern Football League =

The 1929–30 Northern Football League season was the 37th in the history of the Northern Football League, a football competition in Northern England.

== Clubs ==
Northern League
- Season: 1929–30
- Champions: Willington
- Matches: 156
- Goals: 726 (4.65 per match)

The league featured 12 clubs which competed in the last season, along with two new clubs:

- Crook Town
- Eden Colliery Welfare

=== League table ===
Pos	Team	Pld	W	D	L	GF	GA	GR	Pts	Promotion or relegation
1	Willington	24	16	3	5	71	41	1.732	35	
2	Stockton	24	16	1	7	72	36	2.000	33	
3	Bishop Auckland	24	11	5	8	58	47	1.234	27	
4	Eden Colliery Welfare	24	11	4	9	53	51	1.039	26	
5	South Bank	24	9	7	8	60	53	1.132	25	
6	Whitby United	24	10	5	9	69	76	0.908	25	
7	Ferryhill Athletic	24	11	2	11	53	59	0.898	24	
8	Esh Winning	24	11	2	11	56	64	0.875	24	
9	Chilton Colliery Recreation Athletic	24	10	2	12	58	54	1.074	22	
10	Crook Town	24	9	2	13	40	53	0.755	20	Left the league
11	Cockfield	24	9	3	12	43	59	0.729	19 (Note: Cockfield deducted two points for playing an unqualified man.)	
12	Tow Law Town	24	6	4	14	49	62	0.790	16	
13	Stanley United	24	6	2	16	44	71	0.620	14	
–	Langley Park	0	–	–	–	–	–	—	0 (Note: Langley Park resigned from the league on 11 December 1929. Their record (P7 W2 D0 L5 F14 A26 P4) was expunged.)	

Rules for classification: 1) points; 2) goal ratio.
