= 1926–27 Northern Football League =

The 1926–27 Northern Football League season was the 34th in the history of the Northern Football League, a football competition in Northern England.

== Clubs ==
Northern League
- Season: 1926–27
- Champions: Crook Town
- Matches: 182
- Goals: 853 (4.69 per match)

The league featured 13 clubs which competed in the last season, along with one new club:

- Whitby United

=== League table ===
Pos	Team	Pld	W	D	L	GF	GA	GR	Pts	Promotion or relegation
1	Crook Town	26	18	7	1	79	32	2.469	43	
2	South Bank	26	17	4	5	74	43	1.721	38	
3	Ferryhill Athletic	26	16	3	7	76	37	2.054	35	
4	Tow Law Town	26	15	4	7	74	46	1.609	34	
5	Stockton	26	15	3	8	66	42	1.571	33	
6	Bishop Auckland	26	14	3	9	68	42	1.619	31	
7	Whitby United	26	13	2	11	69	57	1.211	28	
8	Willington	26	10	7	9	68	58	1.172	27	
9	Cockfield	26	10	4	12	64	55	1.164	24	
10	Loftus Albion	26	9	4	13	55	70	0.786	22	
11	Langley Park	26	7	2	17	46	84	0.548	16	
12	Stanley United	26	3	5	18	40	77	0.519	11	
13	Eston United	26	4	3	19	42	106	0.396	11	Left the league
14	Esh Winning	26	4	3	19	32	104	0.308	11	

Rules for classification: 1) points; 2) goal ratio.
