= 1922–23 Northern Football League =

The 1922–23 Northern Football League season was the 30th in the history of the Northern Football League, a football competition in Northern England.

== Clubs ==
Northern League
- Season: 1922–23
- Champions: Eston United
- Matches: 182
- Goals: 633 (3.48 per match)

The league featured 13 clubs which competed in the last season, along with one new club:

- Loftus Albion

=== League table ===
Pos	Team	Pld	W	D	L	GF	GA	GR	Pts
1	Eston United	26	17	3	6	60	41	1.463	37
2	Bishop Auckland	26	16	4	6	54	35	1.543	36
3	Cockfield	26	13	4	9	56	40	1.400	30
4	Crook Town	26	10	8	8	41	43	0.953	28
5	Esh Winning	26	12	3	11	48	47	1.021	27
6	Loftus Albion	26	10	7	9	41	41	1.000	27
7	Stockton	26	11	3	12	49	35	1.400	25
8	Tow Law Town	26	8	8	10	36	39	0.923	24
9	Darlington Railway Athletic	26	10	3	13	35	40	0.875	23
10	Stanley United	26	8	7	11	44	57	0.772	23
11	Langley Park	26	11	0	15	45	60	0.750	22
12	Scarborough	26	10	1	15	51	52	0.981	21
13	Willington	26	9	3	14	37	47	0.787	21
14	South Bank	26	9	2	15	36	56	0.643	20

Rules for classification: 1) points; 2) goal ratio.
