= 1936–37 Northern Football League =

The 1936–37 Northern Football League season was the 44th in the history of the Northern Football League, a football competition in Northern England.

== Clubs ==
Northern League
- Season: 1936–37
- Champions: Shildon
- Matches: 182
- Goals: 877 (4.82 per match)

The league featured 13 clubs which competed in the last season, along with one new club:

- Crook Town, joined from the North Eastern League

=== League table ===
Pos	Team	Pld	W	D	L	GF	GA	GR	Pts	Promotion or relegation
1	Shildon	26	20	6	0	80	25	3.200	46	
2	Bishop Auckland	26	19	2	5	70	37	1.892	40	
3	South Bank	26	15	4	7	72	49	1.469	34	
4	Cockfield	26	15	2	9	67	49	1.367	32	
5	Whitby United	26	14	1	11	72	60	1.200	29	
6	Stockton	26	12	3	11	77	52	1.481	27	
7	West Auckland Town	26	11	5	10	68	58	1.172	27	
8	Ferryhill Athletic	26	11	3	12	62	66	0.939	25	
9	Evenwood Town	26	10	2	14	58	75	0.773	22	
10	Willington	26	10	1	15	63	74	0.851	21	
11	Crook Town	26	9	3	14	58	77	0.753	21	
12	Chilton Colliery Recreation Athletic	26	7	3	16	53	67	0.791	17	
13	Trimdon Grange Colliery	26	6	1	19	38	86	0.442	13	Left the league
14	Tow Law Town	26	4	2	20	39	102	0.382	10	

Rules for classification: 1) points; 2) goal ratio.
