= 1935–36 Northern Football League =

The 1935–36 Northern Football League season was the 43rd in the history of the Northern Football League, a football competition in Northern England.

== Clubs ==
Northern League
- Season: 1935–36
- Champions: Shildon
- Matches: 182
- Goals: 844 (4.64 per match)

The league featured 14 clubs which competed in the last season, no new clubs joined the league this season.

=== League table ===
Pos	Team	Pld	W	D	L	GF	GA	GR	Pts	Promotion or relegation
1	Shildon	26	20	4	2	81	27	3.000	44	
2	South Bank	26	19	1	6	86	43	2.000	39	
3	Stockton	26	14	5	7	93	64	1.453	33	
4	Willington	26	14	5	7	64	47	1.362	33	
5	Bishop Auckland	26	10	7	9	66	65	1.015	27	
6	Evenwood Town	26	11	5	10	59	63	0.937	27	
7	West Auckland Town	26	9	7	10	54	52	1.038	25	
8	Ferryhill Athletic	26	9	7	10	65	64	1.016	25	
9	Cockfield	26	8	6	12	59	53	1.113	22	
10	Chilton Colliery Recreation Athletic	26	8	5	13	56	87	0.644	21	
11	Trimdon Grange Colliery	26	8	3	15	41	67	0.612	19	
12	Whitby United	26	7	4	15	62	83	0.747	18	
13	Stanley United	26	6	6	14	53	73	0.726	18	Left the league
14	Tow Law Town	26	5	3	18	47	98	0.480	13	

Rules for classification: 1) points; 2) goal ratio.
