= 1921–22 Northern Football League =

The 1921–22 Northern Football League season was the 29th in the history of the Northern Football League, a football competition in Northern England.

== Clubs ==
Northern League
- Season: 1921–22
- Champions: South Bank
- Matches: 182
- Goals: 640 (3.52 per match)

The league featured 13 clubs which competed in the last season, along with one new club:

- Cockfield

=== League table ===
Pos	Team	Pld	W	D	L	GF	GA	GR	Pts	Promotion or relegation
1	South Bank	26	18	6	2	58	23	2.522	42	
2	Bishop Auckland	26	15	8	3	53	22	2.409	38	
3	Crook Town	26	16	6	4	58	31	1.871	38	
4	Stockton	26	13	4	9	59	41	1.439	30	
5	Cockfield	26	12	6	8	52	37	1.405	30	
6	Tow Law Town	26	13	4	9	52	38	1.368	30	
7	Esh Winning	26	12	3	11	39	41	0.951	27	
8	Willington	26	9	6	11	55	57	0.965	24	
9	Eston United	26	10	3	13	40	52	0.769	23	
10	Langley Park	26	8	5	13	34	52	0.654	21	
11	Darlington Railway Athletic	26	7	6	13	45	58	0.776	20	
12	Scarborough	26	4	8	14	39	71	0.549	16	
13	Stanley United	26	5	3	18	36	64	0.563	13	
14	Redcar	26	3	6	17	20	53	0.377	12	Left the league

Rules for classification: 1) points; 2) goal ratio.
