= 1938–39 Northern Football League =

The 1938–39 Northern Football League season was the 46th in the history of the Northern Football League, a football competition in Northern England.

== Clubs ==
Northern League
- Season: 1938–39
- Champions: Bishop Auckland
- Matches: 182
- Goals: 865 (4.75 per match)

The league featured 14 clubs which competed in the last season, no new clubs joined the league this season.

Billingham South dropped the ‘South’ part from their name.

=== League table ===
Pos	Team	Pld	W	D	L	GF	GA	GR	Pts	Promotion or relegation
1	Bishop Auckland	26	21	3	2	94	27	3.481	45	
2	Shildon	26	21	2	3	92	27	3.407	44	
3	Stockton	26	17	3	6	88	44	2.000	37	Transferred to the North Eastern League
4	Billingham	26	15	1	10	76	57	1.333	31	
5	Willington	26	13	4	9	75	62	1.210	30	
6	Whitby United	26	12	1	13	51	64	0.797	25	
7	Cockfield	26	9	6	11	53	55	0.964	24	
8	West Auckland Town	26	11	2	13	50	56	0.893	24	
9	Ferryhill Athletic	26	9	4	13	62	65	0.954	22	
10	Tow Law Town	26	8	3	15	39	81	0.481	19	
11	South Bank	26	5	8	13	43	69	0.623	18	
12	Evenwood Town	26	7	2	17	43	70	0.614	16	
13	Chilton Colliery Recreation Athletic	26	6	3	17	47	95	0.495	15	Left the league
14	Crook Town	26	4	6	16	52	93	0.559	14	

Rules for classification: 1) points; 2) goal ratio.
