= 1946–47 Northern Football League =

The 1946–47 Northern Football League season was the 49th in the history of the Northern Football League, a football competition in Northern England.

== Clubs ==
Northern League
- Season: 1946–47
- Champions: Bishop Auckland
- Matches: 182
- Goals: 893 (4.91 per match)

The league featured 12 clubs which competed in the last season, along with two new clubs:

- Heaton Stannington
- Whitby Town, joined their name from Whitby United

=== League table ===
Pos	Team	Pld	W	D	L	GF	GA	GR	Pts	Promotion or relegation
1	Bishop Auckland	26	18	2	6	81	47	1.723	38	
2	Crook Colliery Welfare	26	18	2	6	85	50	1.700	38	
3	Stanley United	26	15	5	6	81	49	1.653	35	
4	Shildon	26	15	5	6	72	45	1.600	35	
5	Willington	26	13	5	8	69	53	1.302	31	
6	Ferryhill Athletic	26	13	3	10	77	66	1.167	29	
7	Evenwood Town	26	10	6	10	65	72	0.903	26	
8	Heaton Stannington	26	11	2	13	58	68	0.853	24	
9	Billingham Synthonia	26	9	3	14	58	60	0.967	21	
10	Tow Law Town	26	9	3	14	59	68	0.868	21	
11	West Auckland Town	26	7	5	14	39	62	0.629	19	
12	South Bank	26	7	4	15	65	61	1.066	18	
13	Whitby Town	26	7	4	15	46	75	0.613	18	
14	Brandon Welfare	26	4	3	19	38	117	0.325	11	Left the league

Source: fchd
Rules for classification: 1) points; 2) goal ratio.
