= 1951–52 Northern Football League =

The 1951–52 Northern Football League season was the 54th in the history of the Northern Football League, a football competition in Northern England.

== Clubs ==
Northern League
- Season: 1951–52
- Champions: Bishop Auckland
- Matches: 182
- Goals: 822 (4.52 per match)

The league featured 14 clubs which competed in the last season, no new clubs joined the league this season.

=== League table ===
Pos	Team	Pld	W	D	L	GF	GA	GR	Pts	Promotion or relegation
1	Bishop Auckland	26	20	5	1	89	26	3.423	45	
2	Billingham Synthonia	26	17	3	6	67	35	1.914	37	
3	Willington	26	17	2	7	79	49	1.612	36	
4	Tow Law Town	26	16	1	9	68	45	1.511	33	
5	Whitby Town	26	12	6	8	71	49	1.449	30	
6	South Bank	26	12	5	9	64	68	0.941	29	
7	Evenwood Town	26	10	7	9	53	47	1.128	27	
8	Ferryhill Athletic	26	10	6	10	60	67	0.896	26	
9	Crook Town	26	9	6	11	49	59	0.831	24	
10	Shildon	26	9	3	14	54	62	0.871	21	
11	West Auckland Town	26	7	4	15	43	61	0.705	18	
12	Heaton Stannington	26	8	2	16	55	87	0.632	18	Left the league
13	Stanley United	26	7	1	18	38	81	0.469	15	
14	Penrith	26	1	3	22	32	86	0.372	5	

Rules for classification: 1) points; 2) goal ratio.

Following this season
Durham City Joined
Heaton Stannington Left
