= 1933–34 Northern Football League =

The 1933–34 Northern Football League season was the 41st in the history of the Northern Football League, a football competition in Northern England.

== Clubs ==
Northern League
- Season: 1933–34
- Champions: Shildon
- Matches: 182
- Goals: 795 (4.37 per match)

The league featured 14 clubs which competed in the last season, no new clubs joined the league this season.

=== League table ===
Pos	Team	Pld	W	D	L	GF	GA	GR	Pts
1	Shildon	26	16	5	5	81	41	1.976	37
2	Whitby United	26	14	7	5	67	53	1.264	35
3	South Bank	26	12	4	10	48	43	1.116	28
4	Ferryhill Athletic	26	12	4	10	63	61	1.033	28
5	Stockton	26	12	3	11	59	60	0.983	27
6	Willington	26	10	6	10	59	48	1.229	26
7	Cockfield	26	10	6	10	58	49	1.184	26
8	Evenwood Town	26	11	4	11	54	60	0.900	26
9	Trimdon Grange Colliery	26	10	4	12	59	56	1.054	24
10	Bishop Auckland	26	8	8	10	63	61	1.033	24
11	Tow Law Town	26	8	7	11	51	67	0.761	23
12	Chilton Colliery Recreation Athletic	26	9	3	14	47	65	0.723	21
13	Stanley United	26	5	10	11	47	66	0.712	20
14	Esh Winning	26	7	5	14	39	65	0.600	19

Rules for classification: 1) points; 2) goal ratio.
