= 1934–35 Northern Football League =

The 1934–35 Northern Football League season was the 42nd in the history of the Northern Football League, a football competition in Northern England.

== Clubs ==
Northern League
- Season: 1934–35
- Champions: Shildon
- Matches: 182
- Goals: 844 (4.64 per match)

The league featured 14 clubs which competed in the last season, no new clubs joined the league this season.

=== League table ===
Pos	Team	Pld	W	D	L	GF	GA	GR	Pts
1	Shildon	26	19	5	2	86	23	3.739	43
2	Stockton	26	17	2	7	88	55	1.600	36
3	Ferryhill Athletic	26	16	3	7	69	43	1.605	35
4	Tow Law Town	26	14	4	8	54	46	1.174	32
5	South Bank	26	14	3	9	49	33	1.485	31
6	Bishop Auckland	26	12	4	10	73	59	1.237	28
7	Willington	26	12	2	12	53	57	0.930	26
8	Cockfield	26	11	3	12	69	73	0.945	25
9	West Auckland Town (Note: Esh Winning resigned from the league on 5 October 1934. Their record (P4 W0 D1 L3 F5 A13 P1) was transferred to West Auckland Town.)	26	9	5	12	59	69	0.855	23
10	Trimdon Grange Colliery	26	8	6	12	51	75	0.680	22
11	Whitby United	26	7	5	14	52	65	0.800	19
12	Chilton Colliery Recreation Athletic	26	6	5	15	56	87	0.644	17
13	Stanley United	26	5	5	16	44	80	0.550	15
14	Evenwood Town	26	5	2	19	41	79	0.519	12

Rules for classification: 1) points; 2) goal ratio.
