= 1932–33 Northern Football League =

The 1932–33 Northern Football League season was the 40th in the history of the Northern Football League, a football competition in Northern England.

== Clubs ==
Northern League
- Season: 1932–33
- Champions: Stockton
- Matches: 182
- Goals: 842 (4.63 per match)

The league featured 13 clubs which competed in the last season, along with one new club:

- Shildon, joined from the North Eastern League

=== League table ===
Pos	Team	Pld	W	D	L	GF	GA	GR	Pts
1	Stockton	26	20	1	5	77	34	2.265	41
2	Shildon	26	16	4	6	63	38	1.658	36
3	South Bank	26	14	5	7	59	45	1.311	33
4	Willington	26	14	5	7	68	56	1.214	33
5	Ferryhill Athletic	26	12	4	10	64	51	1.255	28
6	Bishop Auckland	26	11	5	10	67	67	1.000	27
7	Trimdon Grange Colliery	26	11	4	11	62	63	0.984	26
8	Whitby United	26	9	6	11	85	65	1.308	24
9	Cockfield	26	9	5	12	57	64	0.891	23
10	Esh Winning	26	8	7	11	48	57	0.842	23
11	Stanley United	26	8	6	12	53	65	0.815	22
12	Evenwood Town	26	8	5	13	46	60	0.767	21
13	Tow Law Town	26	6	4	16	51	90	0.567	16
14	Chilton Colliery Recreation Athletic	26	4	3	19	42	87	0.483	11

Rules for classification: 1) points; 2) goal ratio.
