= 1931–32 Northern Football League =

The 1931–32 Northern Football League season was the 39th in the history of the Northern Football League, a football competition in Northern England.

== Clubs ==
Northern League
- Season: 1931–32
- Champions: Stockton
- Matches: 182
- Goals: 834 (4.58 per match)

The league featured 12 clubs which competed in the last season, along with two new clubs:

- Evenwood Town
- Harrogate, joined from the Yorkshire League

=== League table ===
| Pos | Team | Pld | W | D | L | GF | GA | GR | Pts | Promotion or relegation |
|---|---|---|---|---|---|---|---|---|---|---|
| 1 | Stockton | 26 | 20 | 2 | 4 | 91 | 32 | 2.844 | 42 | |
| 2 | Trimdon Grange Colliery | 26 | 13 | 5 | 8 | 63 | 48 | 1.313 | 31 | |
| 3 | South Bank | 26 | 13 | 4 | 9 | 60 | 55 | 1.091 | 30 | |
| 4 | Bishop Auckland | 26 | 13 | 3 | 10 | 67 | 49 | 1.367 | 29 | |
| 5 | Cockfield | 26 | 10 | 9 | 7 | 69 | 55 | 1.255 | 29 | |
| 6 | Tow Law Town | 26 | 11 | 6 | 9 | 46 | 45 | 1.022 | 28 | |
| 7 | Ferryhill Athletic | 26 | 12 | 3 | 11 | 66 | 63 | 1.048 | 27 | |
| 8 | Whitby United | 26 | 12 | 3 | 11 | 67 | 66 | 1.015 | 27 | |
| 9 | Evenwood Town | 26 | 12 | 3 | 11 | 61 | 61 | 1.000 | 27 | |
| 10 | Chilton Colliery Recreation Athletic | 26 | 11 | 3 | 12 | 59 | 61 | 0.967 | 25 | |
| 11 | Willington | 26 | 10 | 4 | 12 | 55 | 62 | 0.887 | 24 | |
| 12 | Stanley United | 26 | 6 | 4 | 16 | 43 | 65 | 0.662 | 16 | |
| 13 | Harrogate | 26 | 6 | 3 | 17 | 45 | 79 | 0.570 | 15 | Left the league |
| 14 | Esh Winning | 26 | 5 | 4 | 17 | 42 | 93 | 0.452 | 14 | |

Rules for classification: 1) points; 2) goal ratio.
