= 1945–46 Northern Football League =

The 1945–46 Northern Football League season was the 48th in the history of the Northern Football League, a football competition in Northern England.

== Clubs ==
Northern League
- Season: 1945–46
- Champions: Stanley United
- Matches: 132
- Goals: 678 (5.14 per match)

From the 14 clubs which competed in the 1939-40 season:

- 4 did not reappear
  - Billingham
  - Brandon Social
  - Cockfield
  - Crook Town
- 2 were non-playing members in this season
  - Heaton Stannington
  - Whitby United

Also 4 new clubs joined the league:

- Billingham Synthonia
- Brandon Welfare
- Crook Colliery Welfare
- Stanley United

=== League table ===
Pos	Team	Pld	W	D	L	GF	GA	GR	Pts
1	Stanley United	22	20	0	2	101	29	3.483	40
2	South Bank	22	16	1	5	61	41	1.488	33
3	Billingham Synthonia	22	13	0	9	70	57	1.228	26
4	Shildon	22	12	2	8	57	48	1.188	26
5	Bishop Auckland	22	12	1	9	83	46	1.804	25
6	Evenwood Town	22	9	3	10	45	57	0.789	21
7	Tow Law Town	22	8	4	10	55	59	0.932	20
8	Willington	22	7	5	10	37	52	0.712	19
9	Brandon Welfare	22	7	5	10	42	64	0.656	19
10	Crook Colliery Welfare	22	7	2	13	54	60	0.900	16
11	Ferryhill Athletic	22	5	3	14	44	76	0.579	13
12	West Auckland Town	22	2	2	18	29	89	0.326	6

Source: fchd
Rules for classification: 1) points; 2) goal ratio.
