= 1920–21 Northern Football League =

The 1920–21 Northern Football League season was the 28th in the history of the Northern Football League, a football competition in Northern England.

== Clubs ==
Northern League
- Season: 1920–21
- Champions: Bishop Auckland
- Matches: 182
- Goals: 645 (3.54 per match)

The league featured 12 clubs which competed in the last season, along with two new clubs:

- Tow Law Town
- Langley Park

=== League table ===
| Pos | Team | Pld | W | D | L | GF | GA | GR | Pts | Promotion or relegation |
|---|---|---|---|---|---|---|---|---|---|---|
| 1 | Bishop Auckland | 26 | 19 | 5 | 2 | 71 | 24 | 2.958 | 43 | |
| 2 | Stockton | 26 | 18 | 3 | 5 | 57 | 43 | 1.326 | 39 | |
| 3 | Crook Town | 26 | 15 | 4 | 7 | 58 | 39 | 1.487 | 34 | |
| 4 | South Bank | 26 | 14 | 6 | 6 | 48 | 38 | 1.263 | 34 | |
| 5 | Willington | 26 | 14 | 3 | 9 | 52 | 43 | 1.209 | 31 | |
| 6 | Darlington Railway Athletic | 26 | 13 | 2 | 11 | 43 | 39 | 1.103 | 28 | |
| 7 | Tow Law Town | 26 | 11 | 7 | 8 | 50 | 32 | 1.563 | 27 (Note: Tow Law Town deducted two points for a breach of rule.) | |
| 8 | Langley Park | 26 | 8 | 7 | 11 | 53 | 48 | 1.104 | 23 | |
| 9 | Esh Winning | 26 | 9 | 5 | 12 | 39 | 39 | 1.000 | 23 | |
| 10 | Eston United | 26 | 7 | 8 | 11 | 43 | 51 | 0.843 | 22 | |
| 11 | Stanley United | 26 | 8 | 3 | 15 | 51 | 56 | 0.911 | 19 | |
| 12 | Grangetown St. Mary's | 26 | 6 | 2 | 18 | 30 | 75 | 0.400 | 14 | Left the league |
| 13 | Redcar | 26 | 5 | 4 | 17 | 22 | 58 | 0.379 | 14 | |
| 14 | Scarborough | 26 | 4 | 3 | 19 | 28 | 60 | 0.467 | 11 | |

Rules for classification: 1) points; 2) goal ratio.
