= 1950–51 Northern Football League =

The 1950–51 Northern Football League season was the 53rd in the history of the Northern Football League, a football competition in Northern England.

== Clubs ==
Northern League
- Season: 1950–51
- Champions: Bishop Auckland
- Matches: 182
- Goals: 846 (4.65 per match)

The league featured 14 clubs which competed in the last season, no new clubs joined the league this season.

=== League table ===
Pos	Team	Pld	W	D	L	GF	GA	GR	Pts
1	Bishop Auckland	26	20	2	4	101	34	2.971	42
2	Billingham Synthonia	26	17	3	6	70	24	2.917	37
3	Whitby Town	26	15	6	5	75	42	1.786	36
4	Willington	26	14	4	8	81	46	1.761	32
5	Evenwood Town	26	14	3	9	76	58	1.310	29 (Note: Evenwood Town deducted two points for fielding an unregistered player.)
6	Shildon	26	13	3	10	57	49	1.163	29
7	Crook Town	26	12	2	12	56	66	0.848	26
8	South Bank	26	11	2	13	54	58	0.931	24
9	Stanley United	26	9	4	13	60	64	0.938	22
10	Ferryhill Athletic	26	9	3	14	53	79	0.671	21
11	Penrith	26	7	7	12	43	76	0.566	21
12	Heaton Stannington	26	9	2	15	48	68	0.706	20
13	Tow Law Town	26	4	4	18	41	95	0.432	12
14	West Auckland Town	26	4	3	19	31	87	0.356	11

Source: fchd
Rules for classification: 1) points; 2) goal ratio.
