= 1928–29 Northern Football League =

The 1928–29 Northern Football League season was the 36th in the history of the Northern Football League, a football competition in Northern England.

== Clubs ==
Northern League
- Season: 1928–29
- Champions: Stockton
- Matches: 156
- Goals: 678 (4.35 per match)

The league featured 13 clubs which competed in the last season, no new clubs joined the league this season.

=== League table ===
| Pos | Team | Pld | W | D | L | GF | GA | GR | Pts | Promotion or relegation |
|---|---|---|---|---|---|---|---|---|---|---|
| 1 | Stockton | 24 | 13 | 8 | 3 | 73 | 46 | 1.587 | 34 | |
| 2 | Tow Law Town | 24 | 15 | 3 | 6 | 70 | 40 | 1.750 | 33 | |
| 3 | Whitby United | 24 | 14 | 4 | 6 | 72 | 47 | 1.532 | 32 | |
| 4 | Willington | 24 | 13 | 4 | 7 | 63 | 49 | 1.286 | 30 | |
| 5 | Langley Park | 24 | 9 | 8 | 7 | 50 | 44 | 1.136 | 26 | |
| 6 | Chilton Colliery Recreation Athletic | 24 | 11 | 3 | 10 | 54 | 55 | 0.982 | 25 | |
| 7 | Ferryhill Athletic | 24 | 10 | 4 | 10 | 47 | 55 | 0.855 | 24 | |
| 8 | South Bank | 24 | 6 | 10 | 8 | 44 | 50 | 0.880 | 22 | |
| 9 | Stanley United | 24 | 7 | 6 | 11 | 45 | 55 | 0.818 | 20 | |
| 10 | Bishop Auckland | 24 | 7 | 6 | 11 | 45 | 58 | 0.776 | 20 | |
| 11 | Cockfield | 24 | 6 | 6 | 12 | 41 | 50 | 0.820 | 18 | |
| 12 | Esh Winning | 24 | 7 | 2 | 15 | 40 | 54 | 0.741 | 16 | |
| 13 | Loftus Albion | 24 | 5 | 2 | 17 | 34 | 75 | 0.453 | 12 | Left the league |

Rules for classification: 1) points; 2) goal ratio.
