= 1948–49 Northern Football League =

The 1948–49 Northern Football League season was the 51st in the history of the Northern Football League, a football competition in Northern England.

== Clubs ==
Northern League
- Season: 1948–49
- Champions: Evenwood Town
- Matches: 182
- Goals: 816 (4.48 per match)

The league featured 13 clubs which competed in the last season, along with one new club:

- Penrith

=== League table ===
Pos	Team	Pld	W	D	L	GF	GA	GR	Pts
1	Evenwood Town	26	19	4	3	64	33	1.939	42
2	Bishop Auckland	26	19	3	4	79	38	2.079	41
3	Billingham Synthonia	26	16	5	5	69	41	1.683	37
4	Ferryhill Athletic	26	14	3	9	53	49	1.082	31
5	Willington	26	13	4	9	79	55	1.436	30
6	Penrith	26	14	1	11	66	60	1.100	29
7	Crook Colliery Welfare	26	9	7	10	61	66	0.924	25
8	South Bank	26	9	6	11	54	63	0.857	24
9	Shildon	26	9	5	12	59	57	1.035	23
10	West Auckland Town	26	11	1	14	53	63	0.841	23
11	Stanley United	26	7	4	15	47	66	0.712	18
12	Whitby Town	26	7	3	16	39	68	0.574	17
13	Tow Law Town	26	4	5	17	52	79	0.658	13
14	Heaton Stannington	26	3	5	18	41	78	0.526	11

Source: fchd
Rules for classification: 1) points; 2) goal ratio.
