= 1949–50 Northern Football League =

The 1949–50 Northern Football League season was the 52nd in the history of the Northern Football League, a football competition in Northern England.

== Clubs ==
Northern League
- Season: 1949–50
- Champions: Bishop Auckland
- Matches: 182
- Goals: 840 (4.62 per match)

The league featured 14 clubs which competed in the last season, no new clubs joined the league this season.

Crook Colliery Welfare changed name to Crook Town.

=== League table ===
| Pos | Team | Pld | W | D | L | GF | GA | GR | Pts |
|---|---|---|---|---|---|---|---|---|---|
| 1 | Bishop Auckland | 26 | 21 | 1 | 4 | 81 | 28 | 2.893 | 43 |
| 2 | Billingham Synthonia | 26 | 17 | 3 | 6 | 77 | 46 | 1.674 | 37 |
| 3 | Whitby Town | 26 | 16 | 3 | 7 | 67 | 42 | 1.595 | 35 |
| 4 | Willington | 26 | 16 | 1 | 9 | 76 | 46 | 1.652 | 33 |
| 5 | Evenwood Town | 26 | 14 | 2 | 10 | 70 | 59 | 1.186 | 30 |
| 6 | Tow Law Town | 26 | 12 | 4 | 10 | 63 | 52 | 1.212 | 28 |
| 7 | Ferryhill Athletic | 26 | 11 | 5 | 10 | 64 | 67 | 0.955 | 27 |
| 8 | Shildon | 26 | 10 | 5 | 11 | 56 | 52 | 1.077 | 25 |
| 9 | Crook Town | 26 | 10 | 3 | 13 | 61 | 58 | 1.052 | 23 |
| 10 | Penrith | 26 | 9 | 2 | 15 | 54 | 74 | 0.730 | 20 |
| 11 | South Bank | 26 | 8 | 3 | 15 | 46 | 78 | 0.590 | 19 |
| 12 | West Auckland Town | 26 | 8 | 2 | 16 | 45 | 89 | 0.506 | 18 |
| 13 | Stanley United | 26 | 5 | 6 | 15 | 46 | 74 | 0.622 | 16 |
| 14 | Heaton Stannington | 26 | 4 | 2 | 20 | 34 | 75 | 0.453 | 10 |

Source: fchd
Rules for classification: 1) points; 2) goal ratio.
