= 1911–12 Northern Football League =

The 1911–12 Northern Football League season was the 23rd in the history of the Northern Football League, a football competition in Northern England.

== Clubs ==
Northern League
- Season: 1911–12
- Champions: Bishop Auckland
- Matches: 132
- Goals: 432 (3.27 per match)

The league featured 11 clubs which competed in the last season, along with one new club:

- Willington

=== League table ===
Pos	Team	Pld	W	D	L	GF	GA	GR	Pts	Promotion or relegation
1	Bishop Auckland	22	14	6	2	60	28	2.143	34	
2	South Bank	22	12	5	5	33	18	1.833	29	
3	Crook Town	22	13	3	6	37	24	1.542	29	
4	Leadgate Park	22	11	3	8	36	32	1.125	25	
5	Willington	22	10	3	9	42	36	1.167	23	
6	Stockton	22	8	5	9	46	34	1.353	21	
7	Darlington St Augustine's	22	8	5	9	44	36	1.222	21	
8	Grangetown Athletic	22	7	6	9	25	32	0.781	20	
9	Stanley United	22	8	3	11	27	35	0.771	19	
10	Eston United	22	7	3	12	33	40	0.825	17	
11	West Auckland	22	6	2	14	29	52	0.558	14	Left the league
12	Saltburn	22	4	4	14	20	65	0.308	12	Left the league
