= 1961–62 Northern Football League =

The 1961–62 Northern Football League season was the 65th in the history of Northern Football League, a football competition in England.

== Clubs ==
Northern Football League
- Season: 1961–62
- Champions: Stanley United
- Matches: 240
- Goals: 1,025 (4.27 per match)

Division One featured 16 clubs which competed in the league last season, no new clubs joined the league this season.

=== League table ===
Pos	Team	Pld	W	D	L	GF	GA	GR	Pts
1	Stanley United	30	22	4	4	91	52	1.750	48
2	Penrith	30	16	8	6	55	31	1.774	40
3	West Auckland Town	30	19	2	9	80	50	1.600	40
4	Whitley Bay	30	18	4	8	95	61	1.557	40
5	Crook Town	30	14	7	9	54	31	1.742	35
6	Spennymoor United	30	15	2	13	71	52	1.365	32
7	Billingham Synthonia	30	13	5	12	83	66	1.258	31
8	Durham City	30	14	3	13	49	49	1.000	31
9	Ferryhill Athletic	30	13	3	14	66	68	0.971	29
10	Bishop Auckland	30	10	7	13	71	69	1.029	27
11	South Bank	30	10	5	15	52	68	0.765	25
12	Shildon	30	10	4	16	58	82	0.707	24
13	Whitby Town	30	9	6	15	61	87	0.701	24
14	Tow Law Town	30	9	3	18	56	82	0.683	21
15	Willington	30	6	7	17	44	90	0.489	19
16	Evenwood Town	30	6	2	22	39	87	0.448	14

Source: fchd
Rules for classification: 1) points; 2) goal difference; 3) number of goals scored.
