= 1914–15 Northern Football League =

The 1914–15 Northern Football League season was the 26th in the history of the Northern Football League, a football competition in Northern England.

== Clubs ==
Northern League
- Season: 1914–15
- Champions: Crook Town
- Matches: 71
- Goals: 266 (3.75 per match)

The league featured 11 clubs which competed in the last season, along with two new clubs:

- Harrogate
- Scarborough, joined from the Yorkshire Combination

=== League table ===
| Pos | Team | Pld | W | D | L | GF | GA | GR | Pts |
|---|---|---|---|---|---|---|---|---|---|
| 1 | Crook Town | 16 | 12 | 1 | 3 | 36 | 10 | 3.600 | 25 |
| 2 | Bishop Auckland | 16 | 10 | 4 | 2 | 42 | 13 | 3.231 | 24 |
| 3 | Willington | 16 | 8 | 2 | 6 | 37 | 23 | 1.609 | 18 |
| 4 | Leadgate Park | 16 | 7 | 4 | 5 | 33 | 22 | 1.500 | 18 |
| 5 | Stanley United | 16 | 7 | 2 | 7 | 31 | 25 | 1.240 | 16 |
| 6 | Esh Winning | 15 | 6 | 2 | 7 | 25 | 30 | 0.833 | 14 (Note: Stockton v Esh Winning was not played) |
| 7 | Scarborough | 16 | 6 | 1 | 9 | 23 | 49 | 0.469 | 13 |
| 8 | Darlington St Augustine's | 16 | 3 | 1 | 12 | 22 | 51 | 0.431 | 7 |
| 9 | Stockton | 15 | 3 | 1 | 11 | 17 | 43 | 0.395 | 7 |
| – | .Harrogate | 0 | – | – | – | – | – | — | 0 (Note: Harrogate resigned from the league on 5 September 1914, two hours before their first scheduled match against Bishop Auckland.) |
| – | Eston United | 0 | – | – | – | – | – | — | 0 (Note: Eston United resigned from the league on 12 December 1914. Their record (P3 W1 D1 L1 F5 A5 P3) was expunged.) |
| – | Grangetown Athletic | 0 | – | – | – | – | – | — | 0 (Note: Grangetown Athletic resigned from the league on 12 December 1914. Their record was expunged.) |
| – | South Bank | 0 | – | – | – | – | – | — | 0 (Note: South Bank resigned from the league on 29 January 1915. Their record (P12 W4 D2 L6 F28 A33 P10) was expunged.) |
