= 1967–68 Northern Football League =

The 1967–68 Northern Football League season was the 71st in the history of Northern Football League, a football competition in England.

== Clubs ==
Northern Football League
- Season: 1967–68
- Champions: Spennymoor United
- Matches: 306
- Goals: 1,272 (4.16 per match)

Division One featured 18 clubs which competed in the league last season, no new clubs joined the league this season.

=== League table ===
Pos	Team	Pld	W	D	L	GF	GA	GR	Pts
1	Spennymoor United	34	28	5	1	99	37	2.676	61
2	Whitby Town	34	24	6	4	107	41	2.610	54
3	Tow Law Town	34	22	5	7	103	57	1.807	49
4	Whitley Bay	34	21	5	8	93	41	2.268	47
5	Crook Town	34	15	8	11	71	67	1.060	38
6	North Shields	34	14	9	11	75	56	1.339	37
7	Durham City	34	15	5	14	83	71	1.169	35
8	Blyth Spartans	34	14	7	13	80	71	1.127	35
9	South Bank	34	12	10	12	58	56	1.036	34
10	Billingham Synthonia	34	13	8	13	63	62	1.016	34
11	Bishop Auckland	34	13	6	15	62	67	0.925	32
12	West Auckland Town	34	12	5	17	57	72	0.792	29
13	Evenwood Town	34	11	7	16	61	86	0.709	29
14	Stanley United	34	10	6	18	53	88	0.602	26
15	Shildon	34	11	2	21	58	81	0.716	24
16	Ferryhill Athletic	34	6	7	21	57	94	0.606	19
17	Penrith	34	4	7	23	47	96	0.490	15
18	Willington	34	4	6	24	45	129	0.349	14

Source: fchd
Rules for classification: 1) points; 2) goal difference; 3) number of goals scored.
