= 1910–11 Northern Football League =

The 1910–11 Northern Football League season was the 22nd in the history of the Northern Football League, a football competition in Northern England.

== Clubs ==
Northern League
- Season: 1910–11
- Champions: Eston United
- Matches: 132
- Goals: 477 (3.61 per match)

The league featured 9 clubs which competed in the last season, along with three new clubs:

- Eston United
- Leadgate Park
- Stanley United

=== League table ===
Pos	Team	Pld	W	D	L	GF	GA	GR	Pts	Promotion or relegation
1	Eston United	22	15	4	3	56	24	2.333	34	
2	South Bank	22	14	4	4	50	23	2.174	32	
3	Bishop Auckland	22	13	5	4	67	30	2.233	31	
4	Stockton	22	10	6	6	43	27	1.593	26	
5	West Auckland	22	10	6	6	39	27	1.444	26	
6	Darlington St Augustine's	22	9	4	9	40	41	0.976	22	
7	Crook Town	22	8	4	10	40	48	0.833	20	
8	Leadgate Park	22	8	3	11	38	43	0.884	19	
9	Stanley United	22	6	6	10	29	41	0.707	18	
10	Saltburn	22	5	5	12	35	51	0.686	15	
11	Grangetown Athletic	22	4	7	11	13	33	0.394	15	
12	Knaresborough	22	2	2	18	27	89	0.303	6	Joined Yorkshire Combination
