= Tommy Duff =

English footballer (1905–1951)

Personal information
- Full name: Thomas Edwin Duff
- Date of birth: q4 1905
- Place of birth: West Cornforth, County Durham, England
- Date of death: q3 1951 (aged 45)
- Place of death: Canterbury, Kent, England
- Height: 5 ft 9 1/2 in (1.77 m)
- Position: Outside left

Senior career*
| Years | Team | Apps | (Gls) |
| 192?–1925 | Bishop Auckland | | |
| 1925–1928 | Huddersfield Town | 0 | (0) |
| 1928–19?? | Bournemouth & Boscombe Athletic | 3 | (0) |
| 1930 | Darlington | 2 | (0) |
| 1930–19?? | Crook Town | | |
- * Club domestic league appearances and goals

Thomas Edwin Duff (q4 1905 – q3 1951) was an English footballer who played as an outside left in the Football League for Bournemouth & Boscombe Athletic and Darlington. He was on the books of Huddersfield Town without representing them in the league.

== Life and career ==
Duff was born in West Cornforth, County Durham, the second child of Thomas Duff, a bricklayer, and his wife Elizabeth. He began his football career as an amateur with Northern League club Bishop Auckland, and his performances earned him selection for a Football Association Amateur XI to face an Army XI – the Army won 9–0 – and, in November 1925, a move to Football League First Division club Huddersfield Town. Initially, Duff retained his amateur status with Huddersfield, but he turned professional in September 1926. He played for their reserve team in the Central League, but not for the first team. He came close on one occasion: with undisputed first-choice outside-left Billy Smith absent on representative duty with the Football League XI, Duff would have been the obvious replacement, had he not been injured.

Duff moved on to Third Division South club Bournemouth & Boscombe Athletic, for whom he made his Football League debut during the 1928–29 season. He finished the season, and his spell with the club, with three league appearances. Ahead of the 1930–31 season, Duff joined Third Division Darlington on a month's trial. He scored for the reserves, and played twice in the league – he hit the post near the end of the match after Darlington let slip a two-goal lead against Hull City, – but was not taken on permanently because of what the Northern Daily Mail called the "brilliance" of Peter Bell and Reuben Vine. In September 1930, he signed for North Eastern League club Crook Town.

Duff died in Canterbury, Kent, in 1951 at the age of 45.
