= 1901–02 Northern Football League =

The 1901–02 Northern Football League season was the thirteenth in the history of the Northern Football League, a football competition in Northern England.

== Clubs ==
Northern League
- Season: 1901–02
- Champions: Bishop Auckland
- Matches: 90
- Goals: 293 (3.26 per match)

The league featured 9 clubs which competed in the last season, along with one new club:

- Grangetown Athletic

=== League table ===
Pos	Team	Pld	W	D	L	GF	GA	GR	Pts
1	Bishop Auckland	18	12	3	3	48	22	2.182	27
2	Grangetown Athletic	18	9	8	1	34	14	2.429	26
3	Darlington	18	9	4	5	37	22	1.682	22
4	South Bank	18	7	6	5	32	23	1.391	20
5	Darlington St Augustine's	18	7	5	6	31	22	1.409	19
6	Stockton	18	6	7	5	25	25	1.000	19
7	Crook Town	18	5	3	10	29	41	0.707	13
8	West Hartlepool	18	5	3	10	24	48	0.500	13
9	Scarborough	18	5	3	10	20	35	0.571	13
10	Stockton St. John's	18	2	4	12	13	41	0.317	8
