= George Charlton =

English footballer

Personal information
- Full name: George Charlton
- Position: Outside right

Senior career*
Years	Team	Apps	(Gls)
1933–1934	Darlington	6	(1)
1934–19??	Shildon		
- * Club domestic league appearances and goals

George Charlton (active 1930s) was an English amateur footballer who played as an outside right in the Football League for Darlington and in non-league football for Shildon.

Charlton made his Darlington debut in a 6–2 Third Division North defeat away to local rivals Hartlepools United on 23 September 1933, and did not appear again until the return fixture in February 1934, when the "local product" filled the vacancy left by the transfer of Harry Brown to Chesterfield. This time, he played what the Yorkshire Post described as a "very satisfactory game", scored as his team won 5–3, and played in four of the next five league matches before losing his place to Billy Eden. He moved on to Shildon. In his first season, he scored the winning goal in the Northern League Challenge Cup final, and was a regular in the team that won the 1934–35 Northern League title and reached the first round proper of the FA Cup. He helped Shildon win the title in each of the next two seasons, and was still with the club in 1939.

Charlton also played cricket as a batsman for Darlington Railway Athletic.
