= 1919–20 Northern Football League =

The 1919–20 Northern Football League season was the 27th in the history of the Northern Football League, a football competition in Northern England. South Bank were crowned champions via a three team playoff after they finished the season on 38 points along with Bishop Auckland and Crook Town.

== Clubs ==
Northern League
- Season: 1919–20
- Champions: South Bank
- Matches: 182
- Goals: 670 (3.68 per match)

From the 13 clubs which competed in the 1914–15 season 4 did not reappear:

- Darlington St. Augustine's
- Leadgate Park
- Harrogate
- Grangetown Athletic

Also 5 new clubs joined the league:

- Redcar
- Auckland St. Helen's United
- Darlington Railway Athletic
- Grangetown St. Mary's
- West Hartlepool St. Joseph's

=== League table ===
Pos	Team	Pld	W	D	L	GF	GA	GR	Pts	Promotion or relegation
1	Bishop Auckland	26	16	6	4	76	23	3.304	38	Qualified for the championship play-offs
2	South Bank	26	16	6	4	78	27	2.889	38	Qualified for the championship play-offs
3	Crook Town	26	17	4	5	57	24	2.375	38	Qualified for the championship play-offs
4	Stanley United	26	13	5	8	52	39	1.333	31	
5	Grangetown St. Mary's	26	11	9	6	51	41	1.244	31	
6	Willington	26	11	7	8	43	36	1.194	29	
7	Esh Winning	26	11	4	11	48	34	1.412	26	
8	Eston United	26	9	6	11	48	51	0.941	24	
9	Darlington Railway Athletic	26	10	4	12	45	58	0.776	24	
10	Redcar	26	9	4	13	38	55	0.691	22	
11	West Hartlepool St. Joseph's	26	7	6	13	34	51	0.667	20	Left the league
12	Stockton	26	5	5	16	44	70	0.629	15	
13	Auckland St. Helen's United	26	5	5	16	26	67	0.388	15	Left the league
14	Scarborough	26	5	3	18	30	94	0.319	13	

Rules for classification: 1) points; 2) goal ratio.

== Championship playoff ==
Pos	Team	Pld	W	D	L	GF	GA	GR	Pts
1	South Bank	2	1	0	1	6	4	1.500	2
2	Bishop Auckland	2	1	0	1	5	4	1.250	2
3	Crook Town	2	1	0	1	2	5	0.400	2

Rules for classification: 1) points; 2) goal ratio.
- 4 September 1920: Bishop Auckland 4–2 South Bank
- 11 September 1920: Crook Town 2–1 Bishop Auckland
- 18 September 1920: South Bank 4–0 Crook Town
