= Redcar F.C. =

Former association football club in England

Redcar
- Full name: Redcar Football Club
- Nickname: The Recruits
- Founded: 1913; 113 years ago
- Dissolved: 1923; 103 years ago
- Ground: Redcar Racecourse, Redcar

Redcar Football Club was a football club based in Redcar, England.

It was only in existence for ten years, competing in the Northern League either side of World War I. They were based at the Redcar Racecourse.

== History ==
The club was formed in 1913 by members of the town who wanted Redcar to have club in the Northern League for the first time. Several decades previously, the town were represented by Redcar and Coatham F.C., who had reached the Quarter Finals of the FA Cup in 1886, but football had dwindled in Redcar since their demise in 1895.

After struggling in their first season, in which they failed to score a goal until Boxing Day and finished bottom of the league, the Northern League was suspended for five years due to the outbreak of war. They resumed affairs in 1919 where they managed their highest position - 10th - before financial troubles, an inconsistent starting XI and lack of spectators saw the club on a downward spiral. They finished 13th the next season and dead last the season afterwards, leaving the league for good. They continued for one more season, taking their reserve team's place in the Cleveland League, but a fight for 1st place with Carlin How on the last day of the season was avoided when Redcar abruptly pulled out and disbanded.

== Seasons ==
Season	Division	P	W	D	L	F	A	Pts	Pos	FA Cup
1913–14	Northern Football League	24	4	5	15	30	58	13	13th	Preliminary round
1919–20	Northern Football League	26	9	4	13	38	55	22	10th	Preliminary round
1920–21	Northern Football League	26	5	4	17	22	58	14	13th	Preliminary round
1921–22	Northern Football League	26	3	6	17	20	53	12	14th	Preliminary round

== Honours ==
- North Riding Senior Cup
  - Runners up: 1913-14

== See also ==
- Redcar and Coatham F.C.

== Bibliography ==
- Neal, Tom (2021). The Famous Yorkshiremen: The Forgotten History of Redcar's Footballing Pioneers. London: Old Bird Publishing. ISBN 978-1-3999-0699-9.
