= 1904–05 Northern Football League =

The 1904–05 Northern Football League season was the sixteenth in the history of the Northern Football League, a football competition in Northern England.

== Clubs ==
Northern League
- Season: 1904–05
- Champions: Newcastle United A
- Matches: 156
- Goals: 608 (3.9 per match)

The league featured 13 clubs which competed in the last season, no new clubs joined the league this season.

=== League table ===
Pos	Team	Pld	W	D	L	GF	GA	GR	Pts
1	Newcastle United A	24	22	0	2	83	12	6.917	44
2	Sunderland A	24	16	3	5	59	29	2.034	33 (Note: Sunderland A deducted two points for fielding an ineligible player.)
3	Middlesbrough A	24	13	6	5	69	35	1.971	32
4	Darlington	24	9	6	9	38	38	1.000	24
5	Shildon Athletic	24	8	7	9	48	48	1.000	23
6	South Bank	24	9	5	10	42	44	0.955	23
7	West Hartlepool	24	10	3	11	35	44	0.795	23
8	Bishop Auckland	24	10	2	12	51	49	1.041	22
9	Stockton	24	8	6	10	32	37	0.865	22
10	Darlington St Augustine's	24	9	4	11	34	43	0.791	22
11	Grangetown Athletic	24	8	4	12	36	52	0.692	20
12	Scarborough	24	4	5	15	22	60	0.367	13
13	Crook Town	24	4	1	19	23	81	0.284	9
