= 1897–98 Northern Football League =

Northern League
- Season: 1897–98

The 1897–98 Northern Football League season was the ninth in the history of the Northern Football League, a football competition in Northern England. This was the first season in which the Northern League was split into two divisions.

== Division One ==
Northern League Division One
- Season: 1897–98
- Champions: Stockton
- Matches: 72
- Goals: 272 (3.78 per match)

The division featured 9 clubs which competed in the last season, no new clubs joined the league this season.

=== League table ===
Pos	Team	Pld	W	D	L	GF	GA	GR	Pts
1	Stockton	16	11	2	3	37	20	1.850	24
2	Middlesbrough	16	9	4	3	42	22	1.909	22
3	Darlington	16	8	2	6	41	31	1.323	18
4	Bishop Auckland	16	6	4	6	33	35	0.943	16
5	Darlington St Augustine's	16	7	2	7	29	32	0.906	16
6	Leadgate Park	16	5	4	7	23	34	0.676	14
7	South Bank	16	5	3	8	34	38	0.895	13
8	Tow Law	16	4	4	8	16	24	0.667	12
9	Crook Town	16	3	3	10	17	36	0.472	9

== Division Two ==
Northern League Division Two
- Season: 1897–98
- Champions: Howden-le-Wear
- Matches: 30
- Goals: 103 (3.43 per match)

The division featured 7 new clubs.

=== League table ===
Pos	Team	Pld	W	D	L	GF	GA	GR	Pts	Promotion or relegation
1	Howden-le-Wear	10	5	2	3	17	14	1.214	12	
2	Darlington Rise Carr Rangers	10	5	1	4	22	18	1.222	11	Left the league
3	Loftus	10	5	1	4	18	17	1.059	11	
4	Leadgate Exiles	10	5	0	5	17	17	1.000	10	Left the league
5	Shildon United	10	4	1	5	15	17	0.882	9	
6	Brotton	10	3	1	6	14	20	0.700	7	
–	Britannia Rovers	0	–	–	–	–	–	—	0 (Note: Britannia Rovers were expelled from the league. Their record (P6 W0 D1 L5 F6 A25 P1) was expunged.)	
