= 1906–07 Northern Football League =

The 1906–07 Northern Football League season was the eighteenth in the history of the Northern Football League, a football competition in Northern England.

== Clubs ==
Northern League
- Season: 1906–07
- Champions: Stockton
- Matches: 132
- Goals: 422 (3.2 per match)

The league featured 11 clubs which competed in the last season, along with one new club:

- Leadgate Park

=== League table ===
Pos	Team	Pld	W	D	L	GF	GA	GR	Pts	Promotion or relegation
1	Stockton	22	17	2	3	44	16	2.750	36	
2	South Bank	22	14	3	5	46	24	1.917	31	
3	Crook Town	22	12	1	9	41	33	1.242	25	
4	Leadgate Park	22	11	2	9	40	34	1.176	24	
5	Bishop Auckland	22	10	3	9	40	33	1.212	23	
6	Spennymoor United	22	9	5	8	28	30	0.933	23	
7	Darlington	22	9	2	11	30	37	0.811	20	
8	Shildon Athletic	22	8	3	11	30	38	0.789	19	Joined North Eastern League
9	Grangetown Athletic	22	8	1	13	24	39	0.615	17	
10	West Hartlepool	22	7	2	13	33	44	0.750	16	
11	Darlington St Augustine's	22	6	3	13	32	44	0.727	15	
12	Scarborough	22	7	1	14	34	50	0.680	15	
