= John L. Brown =

John L. Brown may refer to:

- John L. Brown (Ontario politician) (1921–2004), Canadian politician
- John Lewis Brown (1829–1892), French battle, animal, and genre painter
- John Lewis Brown (footballer, born 1921) (1921–1989), English professional footballer for York City
- John Livingstone Brown (1867–1953), Canadian politician
- John Lothrop Brown (1815–1887), Canadian political figure in Nova Scotia
- John Lott Brown (1924–2011), American university administrator and professor
