= George Goldsmith =

English footballer

Personal information
- Date of birth: 11 March 1905
- Place of birth: Loftus, England
- Date of death: 1974 (aged 68–69)
- Position: Right back

Senior career*
Years	Team	Apps	(Gls)
- Bishop Auckland
- Loftus Albion
1928–1933	Hull City	172	(0)
1934	Tottenham Hotspur	1	(0)
1934–1935	Bolton Wanderers	19	(0)
Total		192	(0)
- * Club domestic league appearances and goals

George Goldsmith (11 March 1905 – 1974) was an English professional footballer who played for Bishop Auckland, Loftus Albion, Hull City, Tottenham Hotspur and Bolton Wanderers.

== Football career ==
Goldsmith played non-League football for Bishop Auckland and Loftus Albion before joining Hull City. The right back played 172 matches for the Anlaby Road club between 1928 and 1933. In 1934, Goldsmith signed for Tottenham Hotspur and participated in one match before joining Bolton Wanderers where he went on to feature in a further 19 matches.
