= Reuben Vine =

English footballer (1903–1969)

Personal information
- Full name: Reuben Vine
- Date of birth: 12 September 1903
- Place of birth: Leadgate, England
- Date of death: 13 January 1969 (aged 65)
- Place of death: Cheadle district, England
- Height: 5 ft 4 in (1.63 m)
- Position: Outside left

Senior career*
Years	Team	Apps	(Gls)
- Stanley United
192?–1929	Eden Colliery Welfare		
1929–1931	Darlington	48	(11)
1931–1932	Gateshead	0	(0)
- * Club domestic league appearances and goals

Reuben Vine (12 September 1903 – 13 January 1969) was an English footballer who scored 11 goals from 48 appearances in the Football League playing as an outside left for Darlington between 1929 and 1931. He was on the books of Gateshead without playing for their League team, and played non-league football for Stanley United and Eden Colliery Welfare.

== Personal life ==
Vine was born in 1903 in Leadgate, County Durham. His father, Joseph, was a coal miner originally from Cornwall, and his mother, Barbara Ann née Day, was a local girl. By the time of the 1911 Census, Vine's father was dead and his mother worked as a charwoman to support her five young sons.

Vine married Phyllis May Barham in Ashbourne, Derbyshire, in 1938. The 1939 Register finds the couple living in Cheddleton, Staffordshire, where Vine is working as a mental nurse at the county asylum. His death in 1969 at the age of 65 was registered in the Cheadle district, which includes Cheddleton.

== Football career ==
Vine played football for Stanley United and Eden Colliery Welfare before joining Football League Third Division North club Darlington in 1929. He came into the first team for the Christmas Day fixture against Accrington Stanley, and scored with his first touch of the ball in League football. Vine played twice more over the festive period, then returned to the side on 25 January and scored five goals from five matches during February. He retained the left-wing position to the end of the season, and Darlington retained his services for 1930–31.

In September, Vine was left out of the side for two matches to accommodate triallist Tommy Duff, who was not taken on, but was a regular thereafter until he was injured during a match against York City in March 1931. He regained fitness, but not his place, George Hurst being preferred initially, and then newcomer Mike Westgarth. Vine returned in place of the injured Westgarth to score the only goal after two minutes of the visit to Southport on 11 April, but it was Westgarth who completed the season.

He was given a free transfer at the end of the season, and signed for another Northern Section club, Gateshead, who were without an outside left after the departures of Jimmy Talbot and Albert Taylor. However, it was another new arrival, Dicky Boland, who "found his place on the Gateshead side without much difficulty"; by early October, he was "playing at the top of his form", and he did not miss a game until the following February. Vine saw out the season in the reserve team. The financially struggling club retained only nine players, and Vine was not among them.

== Sources ==
- Tweddle, Frank (2000). The Definitive Darlington F.C. Nottingham: Soccerdata. ISBN 978-1-899468-15-7.
