= Des Fawcett =

English footballer

Personal information
- Full name: Desmond Hallimond Fawcett
- Date of birth: January quarter 1905
- Place of birth: Carlin How, England
- Date of death: 24 October 1968 (aged 63)
- Place of death: Wellington, England
- Height: 6 ft 0 in (1.83 m)
- Position: Goalkeeper

Senior career*
Years	Team	Apps	(Gls)
1923	Middlesbrough	0	(0)
1923–1926	Loftus Albion	?	(?)
1926–1928	Darlington	30	(0)
1928–1929	Nelson	23	(0)
1929–1932	Preston North End	44	(0)
1932–1934	York City	74	(0)
1934–1936	Mansfield Town	72	(0)
1936–1939	Rochdale	93	(0)
1939–1940	Wellington Town	?	(?)
Total		336	(0)
- * Club domestic league appearances and goals

Desmond Hallimond Fawcett (January quarter 1905 – 24 October 1968) was an English professional footballer who played as a goalkeeper. He played over 300 matches in the Football League for six clubs.
