= Charles Allan =

English footballer (1908–1947)

Personal information
- Full name: Charles Edward Allan
- Date of birth: 7 January 1908
- Place of birth: Darlington, England
- Date of death: 1947 (aged 38)
- Place of death: Darlington, England
- Height: 5 ft 9 in (1.75 m)
- Position: Full back

Senior career*
Years	Team	Apps	(Gls)
193?–1932	Darlington	3	(0)
1932–1934	Northampton Town	15	(0)
1934	Kidderminster Harriers		
1934–1937	Darlington	66	(1)
- * Club domestic league appearances and goals

Charles Edward Allan (7 January 1908 – 1947) was an English professional footballer who played in the Football League as a full back for Darlington and Northampton Town.

== Life and career ==
Allan was born in 1908 in Darlington, County Durham, to Charles Edward Wheatland Allan, a bricklayer, and his wife, Meggie née Chipchase. He had an older sister, Laura, and a younger brother, John.

Allan joined his home-town club, Darlington of the Third Division North, from minor football in the area. He made his club and Football League debut on 16 April 1932, coming in to play the last three matches at left back, normally occupied by Herbert Brown. He moved on to Third Division South club Northampton Town. He began the season in their London Combination team, and in early September, scored against Fulham's reserves "with a shot which, if not from the half-way line, was taken from a point preciously close to it." He made his first-team debut on 24 December in a 2–2 draw with Norwich City, and played five more matches in the last few weeks of the season. Retained for 1933–34, he played nine games between September and November, but then injury kept him out until nearly the end of the season. He rejected Northampton's offer of terms for another season, and was transfer-listed at a fee of £200. There were no takers, and he dropped out of League football and signed for Kidderminster Harriers of the Birmingham & District League on a month's trial. The trial proved successful, but Allan turned down the terms offered, returned home and rejoined Darlington.

During the second of his five appearances that season, away to Crewe Alexandra on 16 February 1935, he took over in goal after Jack Beby was sent off in the second half: he conceded once, and the match ended as a 4–1 defeat. He played twice at outside right at the start of the 1936–37 season, but did not get a chance in his proper position until mid-November, when he took over at left back from the injured Don Ashman and kept his place to the end of the season. He scored what proved to be his only Football League goal to open the scoring in a 2–1 win against Accrington Stanley in November with a penalty – he missed one against Chester a couple of weeks later. He helped Darlington reach the final of the 1936–37 Third Division North Cup, which they lost 2–1 to Chester, and in March 1936, he was reported as being watched by an unnamed Lancashire-based First Division club. Allan kept his place until March 1937, when a succession of defeats prompted major changes to the eleven. He appeared once more after being dropped, taking his appearances for Darlington in this second spell to 77 in all competitions, and was released on a free transfer at the end of the season.

Allan married Sarah Scott in 1937. The 1939 Register finds him employed as a platelayer in a steel and armaments plant and living with his wife in Temperance Place, Darlington. Allan died in Darlington in 1947 at the age of 38.

== Career statistics ==
Appearances and goals by club, season and competition
Club	Season	League			FA Cup		Other		Total	
Club	Season	Division	Apps	Goals	Apps	Goals	Apps	Goals	Apps	Goals
Darlington	1931–32	Third Division North	3	0	0	0	—		3	0
Northampton Town	1932–33	Third Division South	6	0	0	0	—		6	0
Northampton Town	1933–34	Third Division South	9	0	0	0	0	0	9	0
Northampton Town	Total		15	0	0	0	0	0	15	0
Darlington	1934–35	Third Division North	5	0	—		0	0	5	0
Darlington	1935–36	Third Division North	29	1	3	0	3 (Note: Appearance(s) in Football League Third Division North Cup)	0	35	1
Darlington	1936–37	Third Division North	32	0	4	0	1	0	37	0
Darlington	Total		66	1	7	0	4	0	77	1
Career total			84	1	7	0	4	0	95	1

== Sources ==
- Joyce, Michael (2004). Football League Players' Records 1888 to 1939. Nottingham: SoccerData. ISBN 978-1-899468-67-6.
- Tweddle, Frank (2000). The Definitive Darlington F.C. Nottingham: SoccerData. ISBN 978-1-899468-15-7.
