= Don Ashman =

English footballer

Personal information
- Full name: Donald Ashman
- Date of birth: 9 October 1902
- Place of birth: Staindrop, County Durham, England
- Date of death: 1984 (aged 81)
- Place of death: Lancaster, England
- Height: 5 ft 10 1/2 in (1.79 m)
- Positions: Left half; full back

Youth career
- Evenwood Juniors

Senior career*
Years	Team	Apps	(Gls)
–	Cockfield		
1924–1932	Middlesbrough	160	(2)
1932–1935	Queens Park Rangers	78	(0)
1935–1936	Darlington	14	(0)
- * Club domestic league appearances and goals

Donald Ashman (9 October 1902 – 1984) was an English footballer who made 252 appearances in the Football League playing at left half or full back for Middlesbrough, Queens Park Rangers and Darlington in the 1920s and 1930s. He began his career in non-league football with Cockfield.

== Life and career ==
Ashman was born in Staindrop, County Durham, one of numerous children of Fred Ashman, a former professional jockey whose father had kept a livery stable in Paris, and his wife Lavinia. As a youngster, Ashman played football for Evenwood Juniors, and went on to work as a miner, playing non-league football for Cockfield. In 1924, Second Division club Middlesbrough paid Cockfield a £10 fee and the promise of a friendly match for Ashman's services.

Described on the club's website as a "composed half-back ... blessed with energy and stamina", Ashman went on to establish himself as a first-team regular as Middlesbrough won the 1926–27 Second Division title. He appeared less frequently the following season as Middlesbrough failed to maintain their First Division status, and even less in 1928–29 as they again won the Second Division championship. He played regularly in 1929–30, but after two more years during which he made just 23 appearances, he moved to Queens Park Rangers for a £500 fee.

He appeared intermittently during his first season with the club, but in 1933–34 was ever-present in the left-back position in Third Division South matches, and played in about half of the following season's fixtures. He was transfer-listed in 1935, and was reported to be buying a newsagents in Barnard Castle, County Durham. In July, he was granted a free transfer, and amid interest from York City and other clubs, signed for Third Division North club Darlington on a free transfer. After playing in the first 15 matches of the season, Ashman sustained an injury and was replaced at left back by Charles Allan, who kept his place to the end of the season. Ashman was released on a free transfer, and retired from football.

Ashman married Alice Simpson, daughter of a local councillor, at Cockfield Church in June 1929. The 1939 Register finds the family living in Horse Market, Barnard Castle: Ashman was a self-employed newsagent and member of the Police War Reserve, and Alice was an ambulance driver with the WVS.

Ashman's death at the age of 81 was registered in the second quarter of 1984 in the Lancaster district of Lancashire.

== Statistics ==
Appearances and goals by club, season and competition
Club	Season	League			FA Cup		Other		Total	
Club	Season	Division	Apps	Goals	Apps	Goals	Apps	Goals	Apps	Goals
Middlesbrough	1924–25	Second Division	13	0	0	0	—		13	0
Middlesbrough	1925–26	Second Division	35	0	1	0	—		36	0
Middlesbrough	1926–27	Second Division	41	1	3	0	—		44	1
Middlesbrough	1927–28	First Division	15	1	2	0	—		17	1
Middlesbrough	1928–29	Second Division	3	0	1	0	—		4	0
Middlesbrough	1929–30	First Division	31	0	6	0	—		37	0
Middlesbrough	1930–31	First Division	4	0	0	0	—		4	0
Middlesbrough	1931–32	First Division	18	0	1	0	—		19	0
Middlesbrough	Total		160	2	14	0	—		174	2
Queens Park Rangers	1932–33	Third Division South	15	0	0	0	—		15	0
Queens Park Rangers	1933–34	Third Division South	42	0	4	0	1 (Note: Appearance(s) in Football League Third Division South Cup)	0	47	0
Queens Park Rangers	1934–35	Third Division South	21	0	1	0	3	0	25	0
Queens Park Rangers	Total		78	0	5	0	4	0	87	0
Darlington	1935–36	Third Division North	14	0	0	0	1 (Note: Appearance in Football League Third Division North Cup)	0	15	0
Career total			252	2	19	0	5	0	276	2
