= John Brown (footballer, born 1921) =

English footballer

Personal information
- Full name: John Lewis Brown
- Date of birth: 23 March 1921
- Place of birth: Crook, County Durham, England
- Date of death: 10 January 1989 (aged 67)
- Place of death: York, North Yorkshire, England
- Height: 5 ft 8 in (1.73 m)
- Position: Full-back

Senior career*
Years	Team	Apps	(Gls)
- Stanley United
1948–1951	York City	22	(0)
1952–????	York Civil Service		
Total		22	(0)
- * Club domestic league appearances and goals

John Lewis Brown (23 March 1921 – 10 January 1989) was an English professional footballer who played as a full-back in the Football League for York City, and in non-League football for Stanley United and York Civil Service.
