= Heaton Stannington F.C. =

Association football club in England

Coordinates: 54°59′56.5″N 1°35′25.7″W

Heaton Stannington
- Full name: Heaton Stannington Football Club
- Nickname: The Stan
- Founded: 1910
- Ground: Grounsell Park, High Heaton
- Capacity: 2,000
- Chairman: Scott Lyndon & Neil Drummond
- Manager: Andy McBride
- League: Northern Premier League Division One East
- 2025–26: Northern Premier League Division One East, 7th of 22
- Website: heatonstan.co.uk
Home colours	Away colours

Heaton Stannington Football Club is a semi-professional football club based in High Heaton, Newcastle upon Tyne, England. They are currently members of the Northern Premier League Division One East and play at Grounsell Park.

== History ==
The current club was established in 1910, although an earlier version of the club was playing in the Newcastle and District Amateur League until resigning in December 1904. They did not join a league until 1913, when they entered the Tyneside Minor League. After one season the club switched to Division Two of the Northern Amateur League. After gaining promotion to Division One, the club won the league's Challenge Cup in 1935–36 before winning the league title the following season. They then moved up to the Tyneside League, finishing as runners-up in 1938–39.

In 1939 Heaton Stannington were elected to the Northern League. They finished bottom of the league in 1948–49 and 1949–50, and after two more bottom-three finishes, the club left the Northern League in 1952 to join the Northern Alliance. After four seasons in the Alliance, they returned to the Northern Amateur League. The club joined the relaunched North Eastern League in 1959, but left after a single season to join the Northern Combination, where they played until joining the Wearside League in 1973.

Financial problems led to Heaton Stannington resigning from the Wearside League and joining the Tyneside Amateur League in 1982, where they played as Heaton United for the 1982–83 season. They were league champions the following season and moved up to the Northern Amateur League, which they won in 1985–86. They then moved up to the Northern Alliance. When the league gained extra divisions in 1988 the club became members of the Premier Division, which they played in until being relegated to Division One at the end of the 1995–96 season.

A fourth-place finish in Division One in 1998–99 saw Heaton Stannington promoted back to the Premier Division. However, they were relegated again at the end of the 2000–01 season. After finishing as Division One runners-up in 2003–04 the club were promoted to the Premier Division. The 2011–12 season saw the club win the Premier Division, and after retaining the title the following season, they were promoted to Division Two of the Northern League. In the buildup to the 2012 Summer Olympics the club played the Gabon Olympic team in a friendly, losing 4–0. In 2021–22 they were runners-up in Division Two, qualifying for the promotion play-offs. After beating Easington Colliery 2–0 in the semi-finals, the club defeated Tow Law Town 2–1 in the final to earn promotion to Division One.

In 2023–24 Heaton Stannington finished third in Division One of the Northern League. In the subsequent play-offs they defeated Birtley Town 1–0 in the semi-finals and then West Auckland Town 3–0 in the final to earn promotion to Division One East of the Northern Premier League. The following season saw them win the Northumberland Senior Cup for the first time, beating Morpeth Town on penalties in the final.

== Ground ==
The original Heaton Stannington club played at Miller's Lane. When the club was re-established, they played at Paddy Freeman's Park before moving to the Coast Road ground. In October 1935 they moved to their current ground, which was known as Newton Park until being renamed Grounsell Park in 2007 in honour of Bob Grounsell. The ground was built on a disused quarry.

== Management ==
As of November 2025

Role	Name
Manager	(England) Andy McBride
Assistant manager	(England) Vacant
First Team Coach	(England) Nick Cassidy
Goalkeeping Coach	(England) Tom Flynn
Physiotherapist	(England) Jordan Dean

== Honours ==
- Northern Alliance
  - Premier Division champions 2011–12, 2012–13
  - League Cup winners 2010–11, 2012–13
  - Challenge Cup winners 1989–90
  - Combination Cup winners 1997–98
  - Subsidiary Cup winners 1999–2000
- Northern Amateur League
  - Division One champions 1936–37, 1985–86
  - Challenge Cup winners 1935–35, 1937–38, 1956–57, 1958–59
- Tyneside Amateur League
  - Champions 1983–84
- Northumberland Senior Cup
  - Winners 2024–25

== Records ==
- Best FA Cup performance: Second qualifying round, 1949–50, 2026–27
- Best FA Trophy performance: Third qualifying round, 2025–26
- Best FA Vase performance: Third round, 1974–75
- Record attendance: 2,107 vs West Auckland Town, Northern League Division One play-off final, 6 May 2024

== See also ==
- Heaton Stannington F.C. players
