= Loftus Albion F.C. =

Defunct association football club in England

- Full name: Loftus Albion Football Club
- Nickname(s): the Albions
- Founded: 1909
- Dissolved: 1930
- Ground: Whitby Road
Home colours

Loftus Albion F.C. was an association football club from the village of Loftus, North Yorkshire, active before the Second World War.

== History ==
An earlier Loftus Albion club played in local football in the 1890s, but the first reference to the current club is from the 1909–10 season, the club playing in the very local Guisborough League.

On 25 March 1911, 20 minutes into a game against Lingdale Mines, Albions right half Frederick Lindsay suffered a broken leg. Dirt entered the wound, and Lindsay died of tetanus on the following Thursday; a jury returned a verdict of accidental death. 11 years later, a player died from an injury received when playing against Loftus - on 13 September 1922, Jock Hutchinson of Whitby Whitehall headed away an Albions shot, and just missed heading away a follow-up shot. He remarked "I would have got that one but the other one stunned me", and collapsed. He died in the early hours of the following morning in a Whitby hospital of a brain haemorrhage.

The club went on a run of success in 1912–13, winning the Scarborough Cup and Cleveland League Cup, and reaching two other finals.

The Albions first entered the FA Amateur Cup in 1913–14, and its best run was to the semi-final in 1920–21. 8,000 spectators turned up to South Bank to see the club take on Bishop Auckland, and Pitts gave the Albions the lead, but Bishop Auckland equalized before half-time and went on to win 2–1. The club had a consolation by winning the North Riding Amateur Cup with an 8–1 final hammering of Grangetown St Matthews.

In 1919–20, the club won the Cleveland League Cup again, by dismantling Feversham Street of Middlesbrough by eleven goals to nil, and the following season entered the FA Cup for the first time. A shock win over Stockton in the first qualifying round caused some surprise, and it took a replay in the third for Hartlepools United to eliminate the Albions; that was however its best run in the FA Cup.

In 1922–23, the club joined the Northern League, after the competition had lost its teams to the new Division 3 North. After three top ten seasons, Albion struggled near the foot of the table, ultimately finishing last in 1928–29 and leaving the competition for the Cleveland League once more.

The club had one last tilt at the Amateur Cup in 1929–30, losing at Whitby United in a third qualifying round replay. The final humiliation for the club was a 13–1 defeat to Middlesbrough Reserves in the first round of the North Riding Senior Cup in November 1929. It did not survive into the 1930–31 season, still owing money to the Northern League, although oddly its reserve side continued in the even more local Loftus League until resigning in 1933.

== Colours ==
The club wore black and white stripes, blue shorts, and black stockings.

== Ground ==
The club's ground was on Whitby Road, and is now the site of the Loftus cricket ground.

== Notable players ==
- Billy Eden, outside left, who joined Darlington from the club in 1928.
- Des Fawcett, goalkeeper, who joined Darlington from the club in 1926.
- George Goldsmith, right back, who joined Hull City from the club in 1928.
