= Northern Football League =

Eighth tier of English league football

Northern League
- Founded: 1889; 137 years ago
- Country: England
- Divisions: Division One; Division Two
- Number of clubs: 42
- Level on pyramid: Levels 9–10
- Promotion to: Northern Premier League; Division One East or West
- Relegation to: Northern Football Alliance Premier Division; Wearside League First Division; North Riding League Premier Division
- Domestic cup(s): Northern League Challenge Cup; Ernest Armstrong Memorial Cup; J. R. Cleator Cup
- Current champions: Guisborough Town (Division One); Redcar Town (Division Two) (2025–26)
- Website: Ebac Northern League
- Current: 2026–27 Season

The Northern League is an English men's football league in north east England. Having been founded in 1889, it is the second-oldest football league in the world still in existence after the English Football League.

It contains two divisions; Division One and Division Two. Division One sits on the ninth tier of the English football league system, five divisions below the Football League. These leagues cover the historic counties of Durham, Northumberland, Cumberland, Westmorland and Yorkshire's North Riding. The champion club of Division One is promoted to the lower division of the Northern Premier League.

== History ==
The Northern league was one of many leagues formed the year after the Football League. In its first season, it consisted of ten clubs that were a mixture of professional and amateur organisations. During its early years, the competition included clubs such as Newcastle United, Middlesbrough and Darlington that would go on to play in the Football League. In 1905, the league split into two divisions, one professional and one amateur. The next year, however, the Northern League made the decision to abolish the professional division and restrict itself to amateur clubs, or at least clubs that claimed to be amateur.

The area covered by the Northern League is coloured in red.

Between the World Wars and in the early years following World War II, the Northern League's amateur status meant that they and their equivalent in the London area, the Isthmian League, dominated the old FA Amateur Cup. The two Leagues continued to be separate from the professional game which was dominated by the Football League, Southern League and, from 1968, the Northern Premier League.

The Northern League and Isthmian League (with its feeder leagues) continued to claim amateur status right up until, following pressure, amateur status was abandoned by the Football Association in 1974. This left amateur leagues like the Northern League to find a place in the overall structure of non-League football. Unlike the Isthmian League, which became a feeder to the Alliance Premier League in 1982, the Northern League and its clubs rejected repeated invitations. It was not until 1988 that two Northern League clubs, Bishop Auckland and Whitley Bay, accepted places in the Northern Premier League. Others including Penrith, North Shields and Spennymoor United jumped ship to neighbouring leagues (the North West Counties League and Northern Counties East League).

The Northern League formally became a feeder to the Northern Premier League, but still few clubs took the opportunity of promotion, with only five moving up over the next 20 years (Gretna in 1992, Blyth Spartans in 1994, Whitby Town in 1997, Newcastle Blue Star in 2007 and Durham City in 2008). Since the mid-2010s, FA rules have meant that clubs who are eligible can no longer refuse promotion, and two Northern League clubs are now promoted each season (the champions and the winner of a four-team playoff).

Since 1995, Northern League clubs have competed for the FA Vase, with some success, having won 11 finals, losing 4 finals. There were two all Northern League finals in 2012 (Dunston UTS beat West Auckland Town) and 2020 (Hebburn Town beat Consett).

The League had an unusual sponsorship deal put in place by Brooks Mileson, owner of the Albany Group, who were its sponsors in 2003. In that year, Mileson announced that he had created a trust which would continue to sponsor the league throughout his lifetime and that of his sons. In 2008, however, the league announced that this sponsorship had come to an end, and it held a raffle to determine its next sponsor. Interested parties were invited to buy a stake in the raffle for £250. The winning stake was held by a local training company and the league was known as the skilltrainingltd Northern League from the 2008–09 season until the 2011–12 season. The league is currently sponsored by dehumidifier manufacturer Ebac.

Level 11 clubs from the North Riding Football League, Northern Football Alliance and Wearside Football League may apply for promotion into the Northern League's Second Division (level 10).

== Current members ==
Location of the Northumberland, County Durham and Tyne & Wear clubs in the Northern League by division
– First Division – Second Division
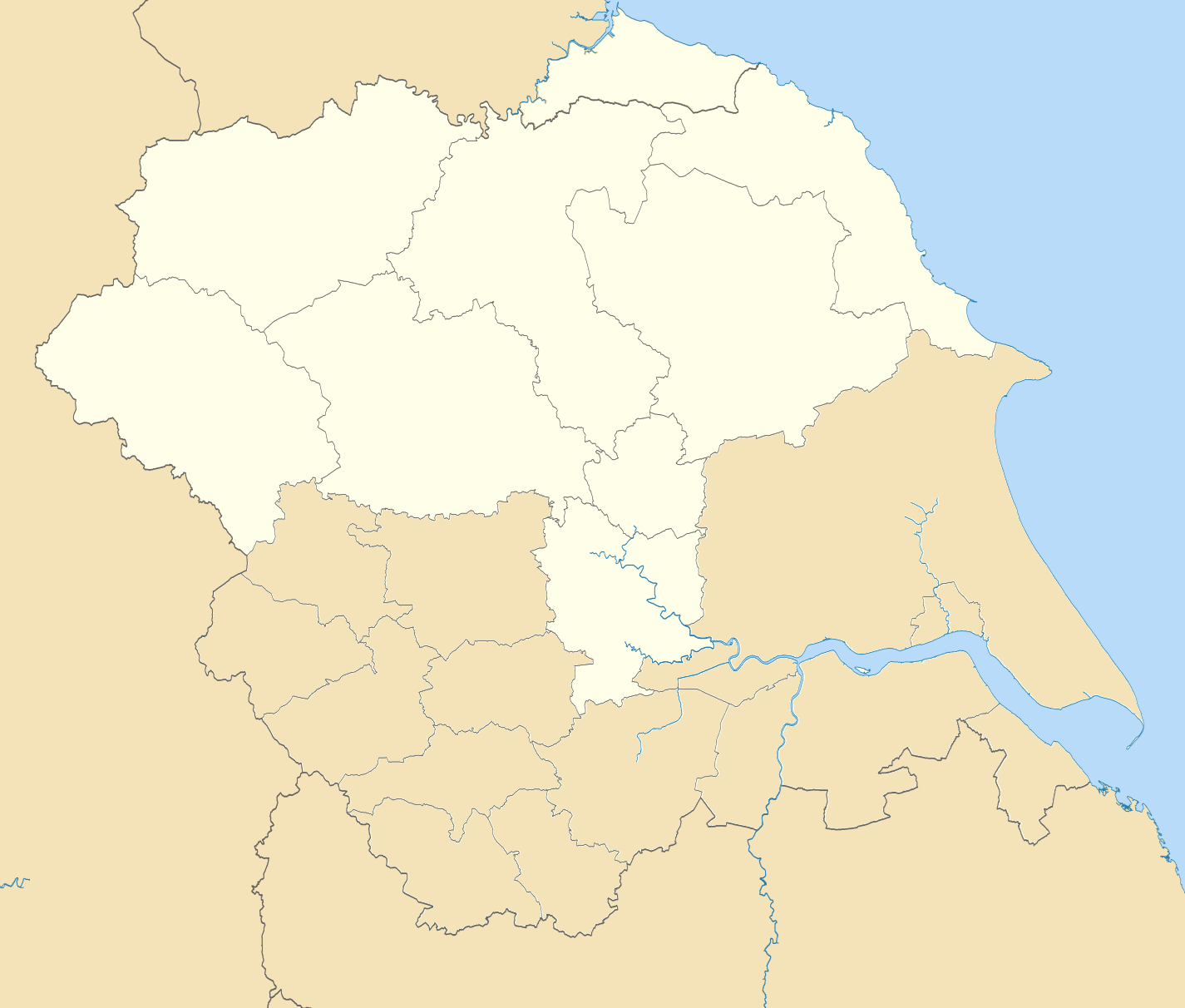
Location of the North Yorkshire clubs in the Northern League
Location of the Cumbria clubs in the Northern League

=== Division One ===
Club	Home ground
Birtley Town	Birtley Sports Complex
Boro Rangers	Trinity College, Middlesbrough
Carlisle City	Gillford Park
Crook Town	The Sir Tom Cowie Millfield Ground
Easington Colliery	Welfare Ground (Easington)
Guisborough Town	King George V Ground
Horden Community Welfare	Horden Recreation Ground
Kendal Town	Parkside Road
Marske United	Mount Pleasant
Newcastle Benfield	Sam Smith's Park
Newcastle Blue Star	Scotswood Sports Centre
North Shields	Daren Persson Stadium
Northallerton Town	Calvert Stadium
Penrith	Frenchfields Stadium
Shildon	Dean Street
Thornaby	Teesdale Park
West Allotment Celtic	East Palmersville Sports Pavilion
West Auckland Town	The Wanted Metal Stadium
Whickham	The Glebe Sports Ground
Whitley Bay	Hillheads Park

=== Division Two ===
Club	Home ground
A.F.C. Newbiggin	Newbiggin Sports Centre
Alnwick Town	St James' Park
Billingham Synthonia	Broughton Road
Billingham Town	Bedford Terrace
Boldon CA	Boldon Colliery Welfare
Chester-le-Street Town	Moor Park
Darlington Town	Eastbourne Community Stadium
Durham United	Graham Sports Centre
Grangetown Boys Club	B&W Lifting Ltd Stadium
Esh Winning	West Terrace
FC Hartlepool	Grayfields Enclosure
Jarrow	Perth Green CA
Newcastle University	Kimberley Park (Prudhoe)+
Park View	Riverside
Prudhoe Youth Club	Kimberley Park
Redcar Town	The Vibrant Doors Stadium
Ryton & Crawcrook Albion	Kingsley Park
Seaham Red Star	Seaham Town Park
Sunderland RCA	Meadow Park
Sunderland West End	Ford Quarry
Tow Law Town	Ironworks Road
Yarm & Eaglescliffe	Bedford Terrace (Billingham)+

+ indicates ground share

== Champions ==
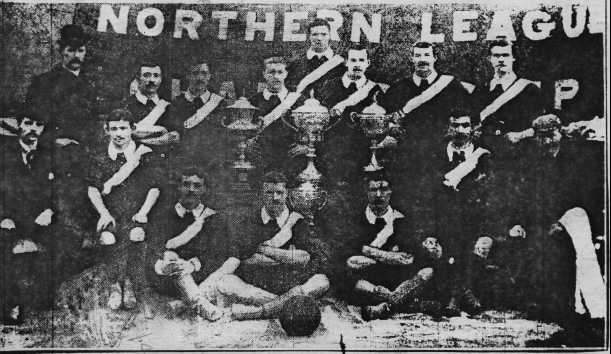
Middlesbrough Ironopolis were champions three times in a row in the 1890s.

Originally the league comprised a single division. The champions were as follows:

Season	Champions
1889–90	Darlington St. Augustine's
1890–91	Middlesbrough Ironopolis
1891–92	Middlesbrough Ironopolis
1892–93	Middlesbrough Ironopolis
1893–94	Middlesbrough
1894–95	Middlesbrough
1895–96	Darlington
1896–97	Middlesbrough

In 1897, the league briefly split into two divisions.

Season	Division One	Division Two
1897–98	Stockton	Howden-le-Wear
1898–99	Bishop Auckland	Stockton St. John's
1899–1900	Darlington	Whitby

In 1900, the league reverted to a single division.

Season	Champions
1900–01	Bishop Auckland
1901–02	Bishop Auckland
1902–03	Newcastle United A
1903–04	Newcastle United A
1904–05	Newcastle United A

In 1905 the league split into two sections, one for professionals and one for amateurs. This lasted for a single season.

Season	Professional	Amateur
1905–06	Sunderland A	Bishop Auckland

In 1906 the league reverted to a single division, a format retained until 1982.

Season	Champions
1906–07	Stockton
1907–08	South Bank
1908–09	Bishop Auckland
1909–10	Bishop Auckland
1910–11	Eston United
1911–12	Bishop Auckland
1912–13	Esh Winning Rangers
1913–14	Willington
1914–15	Crook Town
1915–19	Not contested due to World War I
1919–20	South Bank
1920–21	Bishop Auckland
1921–22	South Bank
1922–23	Eston United
1923–24	Tow Law Town
1924–25	Tow Law Town
1925–26	Willington
1926–27	Crook Town
1927–28	Chilton Colliery Recreation
1928–29	Stockton
1929–30	Willington
1930–31	Bishop Auckland
1931–32	Stockton
1932–33	Stockton
1933–34	Shildon
1934–35	Shildon
1935–36	Shildon
1936–37	Shildon
1937–38	Ferryhill Athletic
1938–39	Bishop Auckland
1939–40	Shildon
1940–45	Not contested due to World War II
1945–46	Stanley United
1946–47	Bishop Auckland
1947–48	Ferryhill Athletic
1948–49	Evenwood Town
1949–50	Bishop Auckland
1950–51	Bishop Auckland
1951–52	Bishop Auckland
1952–53	Crook Town
1953–54	Bishop Auckland
1954–55	Bishop Auckland
1955–56	Bishop Auckland
1956–57	Billingham Synthonia
1957–58	Ferryhill Athletic
1958–59	Crook Town
1959–60	West Auckland Town
1960–61	West Auckland Town
1961–62	Stanley United
1962–63	Crook Town
1963–64	Stanley United
1964–65	Whitley Bay
1965–66	Whitley Bay
1966–67	Bishop Auckland
1967–68	Spennymoor United
1968–69	North Shields
1969–70	Evenwood Town
1970–71	Evenwood Town
1971–72	Spennymoor United
1972–73	Blyth Spartans
1973–74	Spennymoor United
1974–75	Blyth Spartans
1975–76	Blyth Spartans
1976–77	Spennymoor United
1977–78	Spennymoor United
1978–79	Spennymoor United
1979–80	Blyth Spartans
1980–81	Blyth Spartans
1981–82	Blyth Spartans

In 1982 the league added a second division.

Season	Division One	Division Two
1982–83	Blyth Spartans	Peterlee Newtown
1983–84	Blyth Spartans	Chester-le-Street Town
1984–85	Bishop Auckland	Brandon United
1985–86	Bishop Auckland	Newcastle Blue Star
1986–87	Blyth Spartans	Billingham Synthonia
1987–88	Blyth Spartans	Stockton
1988–89	Billingham Synthonia	Consett
1989–90	Billingham Synthonia	Murton
1990–91	Gretna	West Auckland Town
1991–92	Gretna	Stockton
1992–93	Whitby Town	Dunston Federation Brewery
1993–94	Durham City	Bedlington Terriers
1994–95	Tow Law Town	Whickham
1995–96	Billingham Synthonia	Morpeth Town
1996–97	Whitby Town	Northallerton
1997–98	Bedlington Terriers	Chester-le-Street Town
1998–99	Bedlington Terriers	Durham City
1999–2000	Bedlington Terriers	Brandon United
2000–01	Bedlington Terriers	Ashington
2001–02	Bedlington Terriers	Shildon
2002–03	Brandon United	Penrith
2003–04	Dunston Federation Brewery	Ashington
2004–05	Dunston Federation Brewery	West Allotment Celtic
2005–06	Newcastle Blue Star	Consett
2006–07	Whitley Bay	Spennymoor Town
2007–08	Durham City	Penrith Town
2008–09	Newcastle Benfield	Horden Colliery Welfare
2009–10	Spennymoor Town	Stokesley
2010–11	Spennymoor Town	Newton Aycliffe
2011–12	Spennymoor Town	Team Northumbria
2012–13	Darlington	Crook Town
2013–14	Spennymoor Town	North Shields
2014–15	Marske United	Seaham Red Star
2015–16	Shildon	South Shields
2016–17	South Shields	Stockton Town
2017–18	Marske United	Blyth
2018–19	Dunston UTS	Billingham Town
2019–20	No champions; season abandoned due to coronavirus pandemic	
2020–21	No champions; season abandoned due to lockdown regulations	
2021–22	North Shields	Carlisle City
2022–23	Newton Aycliffe	Boro Rangers
2023–24	Bishop Auckland	Blyth Town
2024–25	Redcar Athletic	Horden C.W.
2025–26	Guisborough Town	Redcar Town

== League Cup ==
Season	Winner	Score	Runners–up	Venue	Notes
1923–24	Cockfield	3–1	Ferryhill Athletic	Bishop Auckland	
1924–25	Willington	2–0	Ferryhill Athletic	Bishop Auckland	
1925–26	Willington	2–0	Crook Town	Bishop Auckland	
1926–27	Stockton	1–1	Bishop Auckland	Crook	
1926–27 (R)	Stockton	0–0	Bishop Auckland	Bishop Auckland	
1926–27 (R2)	Stockton	1–1	Bishop Auckland	Stockton	
1926–27 (R3)	Stockton	3–0	Bishop Auckland	Crook	
1927–28	Willington	1–1	Chilton Colliery RA	Bishop Auckland	
1927–28 (R)	Willington	3–2	Chilton Colliery RA	Chilton	
1928–29	Whitby United	2–1	Chilton Colliery RA	Stockton	
1929–30	Stockton	4–2	Ferryhill Athletic	Bishop Auckland	
1930–31	Willington	3–1	Chilton Colliery RA	Bishop Auckland	
1931–32	Willington	2–2	Whitby United	Bishop Auckland	
1931–32 (R)	Willington	2–2	Whitby United	Stockton	
1932–33	Stockton	2–0	Willington	Bishop Auckland	
1933–34	Shildon	3–1	Bishop Auckland	Shildon	
1934–35	Shildon	2–1	Chilton Colliery RA	Bishop Auckland	
1935–36	Evenwood Town	3–2	Trimdon Grange	Bishop Auckland	
1936–37	Crook Town	2–2	Bishop Auckland	Shildon	
1936–37 (R)	Crook Town	2–1	Bishop Auckland	Willington	
1937–38	Shildon	1–0	Cockfield	Bishop Auckland	
1938–39	Shildon	2–0	Ferryhill Athletic	Bishop Auckland	
1939–40	Shildon	2–0	Bishop Auckland	Shildon	
1945–46	Crook Colliery Welfare	2–1	Bishop Auckland	Shildon	
1946–47	Stanley United	3–1	Shildon	Ferryhill	
1947–48	South Bank	3–1	Tow Law Town	Bishop Auckland	
1948–49	Willington	4–2	West Auckland Town	Bishop Auckland	
1949–50	Bishop Auckland	3–1	Shildon	Bishop Auckland	
1950–51	Bishop Auckland	6–2	Ferryhill Athletic	Shildon	
1951–52	Billingham Synthonia	1–1	Tow Law Town	Bishop Auckland	
1951–52 (R)	Billingham Synthonia	1–0	Tow Law Town	Bishop Auckland	
1952–53	Shildon	3–3	Evenwood Town	Bishop Auckland	
1952–53 (R)	Shildon	3–2	Evenwood Town	Bishop Auckland	
1953–54	Bishop Auckland	4–1	Shildon	Bishop Auckland	
1954–55	Bishop Auckland	6–0	Crook Town	Crook	
1955–56	South Bank	2–0	Bishop Auckland	Crook	
1956–57	Willington	3–0	Evenwood Town	Bishop Auckland	
1957–58	Stanley United	2–1	Durham City	Bishop Auckland	
1958–59	West Auckland Town	7–0	Crook Town	Shildon	
1959–60	Bishop Auckland	1–0	Penrith	Shildon	
1960–61	Crook Town	2–0	Bishop Auckland	Crook	
1961–62	Stanley United	5–1	West Auckland Town	Shildon	
1962–63	West Auckland Town	4–0	Crook Town	Shildon	
1963–64	Whitby Town	2–0	West Auckland Town	Shildon	
1964–65	Whitley Bay	1–1	Spennymoor United	North Shields	
1964–65 (R)	Whitley Bay	3–1	Spennymoor United	North Shields	
1965–66	Spennymoor United	2–1	Penrith	Shildon	
1966–67	Bishop Auckland	4–0	Tow Law Town	Spennymoor	
1967–68	Spennymoor United	0–0	Whitley Bay	Crook	
1967–68 (R)	Spennymoor United	3–2	Whitley Bay	North Shields	
1968–69	North Shields	2–0	Tow Law Town	Spennymoor	
1969–70	Whitby Town	4–1	Spennymoor United	South Bank	
1970–71	Whitley Bay	4–1	North Shields	Blyth	
1971–72	North Shields	0–0	Spennymoor United	Blyth	
1971–72 (R)	North Shields	2–1	Spennymoor United	Ferryhill	
1972–73	Blyth Spartans	2–0	Spennymoor United	Spennymoor	
1973–74	Tow Law Town	2–1	Ashington	Crook	
1974–75	Willington	2–1	Bishop Auckland	Spennymoor	
1975–76	Bishop Auckland	2–1	Ashington	Blyth	
1976–77	Whitby Town	3–1	Durham City	Spennymoor	
1977–78	Blyth Spartans	5–1	Willington	North Shields	
1978–79	Blyth Spartans	4–3	Consett	Spennymoor	
1979–80	Spennymoor United	2–1	North Shields	Consett	
1980–81	Spennymoor United	2–0	Consett	Blyth	
1981–82	Blyth Spartans	*1–1	South Bank	Bishop Auckland	*2–1(pens)
1982–83	Norton & Stockton Ancients	2–1	Whitby Town	Horden	
1983–84	Horden Colliery Welfare	2–0	Blyth Spartans	North Shields	
1984–85	Whitby Town	2–1	North Shields	Spennymoor	
1985–86	Blue Star	2–0	Durham City	Spennymoor	
1986–87	Spennymoor United	2–1	Easington Colliery	Shildon	
1987–88	Billingham Synthonia	2–1	Shildon	Spennymoor	
1988–89	Guisborough Town	2–1	Tow Law Town	Spennymoor	
1989–90	Billingham Synthonia	5–2	Whitby Town	Guisborough	
1990–91	Gretna	1–0	Newcastle Blue Star	Newcastle (Blue Star)	
1991–92	Blyth Spartans	1–0	Consett	Murton	
1992–93	Seaham Red Star	*2–2	Brandon United	Billingham (Town)	*3–0 (pens)
1993–94	Northallerton Town	2–0	Blyth Spartans	Brandon	
1994–95	Consett	2–0	Whitby Town	Crook	
1995–96	Whitby Town	1–0	Dunston Fed Brewery	Billingham (Synthonia)	
1996–97	Bedlington Terriers	3–0	Billingham Synthonia	Dunston	
1997–98	Dunston Fed Brewery	3–2	Tow Law Town	Durham	
1998–99	Dunston Fed Brewery	4–1	Jarrow Roofing	Peterlee	
1999–00	Dunston Fed Brewery	4–0	Durham City	Jarrow	
2000–01	Bedlington Terriers	4–1	Marske United	West Auckland	
2001–02	Durham City	*3–2	Shildon	Durham	aet *gg
2002–03	Shildon	*3–2	Billingham Synthonia	Darlington (Feethams)	aet *gg
2003–04	Dunston Fed Brewery	*2–1	Durham City	Whitley Bay	aet *gg
2004–05	Bedlington Terriers	*2–2	Dunston Fed Brewery	Durham	*7–6 (pens)
2005–06	Newcastle Blue Star	1–0	Dunston Fed Brewery	Durham City	aet
2006–07	Newcastle Benfield	1–0	Sunderland Nissan	Dunston	
2007–08	Billingham Town	2–1	Shildon	Seaham	
2008–09	Newcastle Benfield	2–0	West Allotment Celtic	West Allotment	
2009–10	South Shields	*2–2	Ashington	Dunston	*6–5 (pens)
2010–11	Newcastle Benfield	3–1	Spennymoor Town	Dunston	aet
2011–12	Team Northumbria	4–1	West Auckland Town	Newcastle (Coach Lane)	
2012–13	Spennymoor Town	1–0	Newcastle Benfield	Consett	
2013–14	Marske United	2–1	Whitley Bay	Newcastle (St.James' Park)	aet
2014–15	Shildon	2–0	Newton Aycliffe	Bishop Auckland	
2015–16	Shildon	*1–1	Marske United	Billingham (Synthonia)	*4–3 (pens)
2016–17	South Shields	5–0	North Shields	Whitley Bay	
2017–18	Dunston UTS	1–0	Bishop Auckland	Consett	
2018–19	West Auckland Town	*0–0	Newcastle Benfield	Seaham	*4–3 (pens)
2019–20	Cancelled due to COVID–19 pandemic				
2020–21	Cancelled due to COVID–19 local lockdown regulations				
2021–24	Not contested				
2024–25	Easington Colliery	3–1	Shildon	Birtley	

- gg = Golden goal
