= Eston United F.C. =

Eston United
- Full name: Eston United Football Club
- Founded: 1905 as Normanby United
- Dissolved: 1929
- League: Northern League
- 1926–27: Northern League, 13th
Home colours

Eston United Football Club was an English association football club from Eston, then in Yorkshire, founded in 1905.

== History ==
Initially named Normanby United, their name was quickly changed to Eston United soon after formation. They participated in the Northern League from 1910 to 1927, winning the league on two occasions. Eston were also twice losing finalists in the FA Amateur Cup, losing 6–0 to Clapton in the 1908–09 season and in the 1911–12 season they lost 1–0 to Stockton in a replay after the first tie ended in a 1–1 draw.

By 1926, the club was running out of funds, the gates for matches not even reaching £1, but continued on amateur lines, losing 5–3 in the final of the North Riding Amateur Cup to Albert Hill United at the end of the 1927–28 season. However the club does not seem to have survived a 9–0 defeat to Scarborough in the same competition the next season, Eston scoring three own goals.

== Colours ==
The club's first choice of colour was blue, with darker trim, and a change kit of red.

== Ground ==
The club originally played at the Cattle Show Ground.

== Achievements ==
- FA Amateur Cup
  - Runners-up: 1908–09, 1911–12
- Northern League
  - Champions: 1910–11, 1922–23
