= Chilton Colliery Recreation F.C. =

English football club

Chilton Colliery Recreation
- Full name: Chilton Colliery Recreation Athletic Football Club
- Nickname(s): the Colliers
- Founded: 1919
- Dissolved: 1940
- Ground: Recreation Ground
Home colours

Chilton Colliery Recreation Athletic F.C., normally referred to as Chilton Colliery Recreation, was an English association football club from Chilton, County Durham, active in the inter-war period.

== History ==
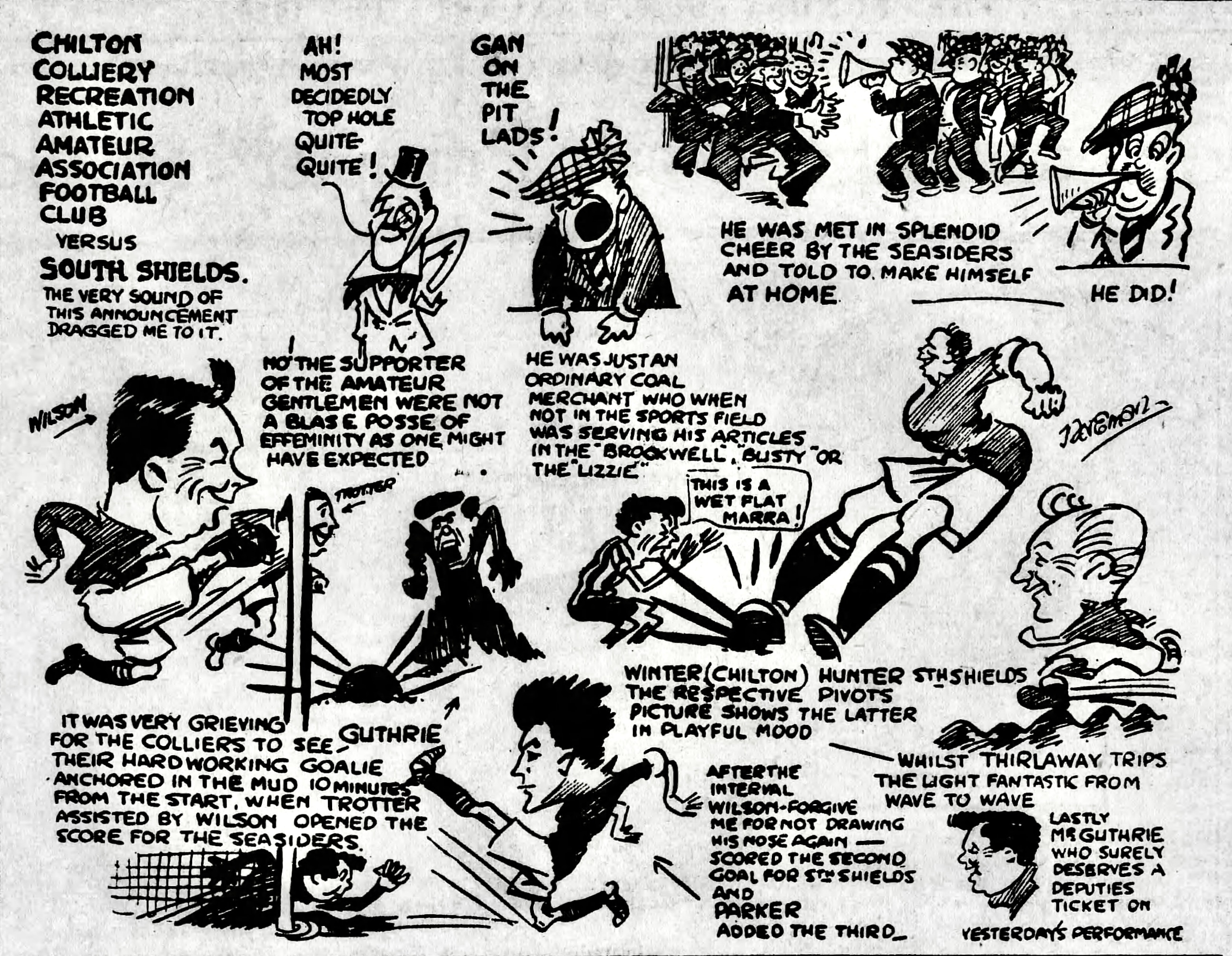
South Shields 3–0 Chilton Colliery Recreation, 1935–26 FA Cup 3rd round, Sunday Sun, 10 January 1926

The club was founded in 1919, and, as members of the Palatine League in County Durham, reached the semi-final of the FA Amateur Cup in 1923–24, losing to eventual winner Clapton at Feethams. It joined the Northern Football League in 1927 and won the title in its first season. However the economy turned against coal-mining areas late in the decade, and the club declined to the extent that it failed re-election in 1939; it joined the Durham Central League, but did not re-emerge after the start of the Second World War.

The club played in the FA Cup five times, reaching the third round proper in 1925–26, having beaten Carlisle United in the first round, and Football League Division Three North side Rochdale in a second round replay. The Rochdale win was especially surprising given that Colliery's centre-half Catterick was sent off in the first half. The run ended at Second Division side South Shields in front of 15,000 spectators.

== Colours ==
The club originally wore black and white striped shirts, black shorts, and black socks. By 1931–32 the shirts were blue and the shorts were white.

== Ground ==
The club played at the Recreation Ground, behind West Chilton Terrace, which was opened in 1921. The highest recorded crowd was 5,000, for the home Cup tie with Rochdale on 12 December 1925.

== Former players ==
1. Players that have played/managed in the Football League or any foreign equivalent to this level (i.e. fully professional league).
2. Players with full international caps.
3. Players that hold a club record or have captained the club.

- (England) Tom Baker
- Notable players ( 11 )
