= Cockfield F.C. =

Football club in England

- Full name: Cockfield Football Club
- Nickname: the Fellmen
- Founded: 1884
- Dissolved: 2010
- Ground: Hazel Grove
Home colours

Cockfield Football Club was an association football team from the village of Cockfield, County Durham in the north of England which was dubbed the "Village Wonder Team" in the 1920s after achieving success in the national FA Amateur Cup. The club's fortunes later declined significantly and it folded in 2010.

== History ==
The club was formed in 1884, and its first notable success was taking the championship of the Wear Valley League in the 1907–08 season. Cockfield joined the Northern League, at the time the leading amateur league in northern England, in 1921 and finished in the top half of the table for five consecutive seasons. In the 1922–23 season, the club reached the semi-finals of the FA Amateur Cup, losing to Evesham Town. This achievement by a team from a "two-street pit village" led to the club gaining the epithet the "Village Wonder Team" in football circles. The following season, the club won the first edition of the Northern League Challenge Cup, with a 3–1 win over Ferryhill at Feethams.

In the 1927–28 season, the village side, consisting entirely of unemployed coalminers, again reached the semi-finals of the FA Amateur Cup and this time defeated Willington to reach the final. The final was played at Ayresome Park, Middlesbrough, where Cockfield twice took the lead but eventually lost 3–2 to the holders Leyton in front of over 12,000 spectators. Due to replays, the club required 14 ties to reach the final, and the run included a 1–0 win at St Albans City having sold home advantage for £100.

Cockfield played in the Northern League until 29 November 1939, when the club resigned its place in the league; it had lost £44 over the previous season and only 10 people had attended its annual general meeting. The club continued to compete after the Second World War and, in the early 1950s, played in the Durham Central League and scored a surprise Amateur Cup win over South Bank of the Northern League. Cockfield also played in the qualifying rounds of the FA Cup, with minimal success, until at least the 1958–59 season.

The club continued to compete in local leagues into the 21st century, being re-founded in 1985 after years in abeyance, FIFA referee Pat Partridge becoming club president. In the 2002–03 season, the club competed in the Durham Alliance. By 2006, the club was playing in the very minor Crook and District League and its home ground at Hazel Grove was in an extreme state of dereliction. Although there had once been a grandstand and pavilion, there was little left except for a rail around the pitch and the dugouts. Lack of funding from the parish council for repairs to the changing rooms at Hazel Grove ultimately led to the club folding in 2010.

== Colours ==
The club wore various combinations of colours, including halved jerseys, jerseys with white sleeves, and dark blue jerseys during its existence, but by the 1990s, had settled into green shirts and white shorts and socks.

== Ground ==
The club's ground was at Hazel Grove, sometimes rendered as Hazelgrove.

== Former players ==
- (England) Jack Holliday

Five players from the 1923–24 Northern League Cup-winning side alone turned professional; Don Ashman with Middlesbrough, Jake Iceton with Fulham, Billy Roe with Tottenham Hotspur, Mark Hooper with Sheffield Wednesday, and Cud Robson with Leeds United.
