= Whitby Town F.C. =

Association football club in Whitby, England

Coordinates: 54°29′24″N 0°37′39″W

Whitby Town
- Full name: Whitby Town Football Club
- Nickname: The Blues / The Seasiders
- Founded: 1880; 146 years ago (as Streaneshalch F.C.)
- Ground: Turnbull Ground; Whitby; North Yorkshire
- Capacity: 3,500 (505 covered seats)
- Chairman: Ivor Homer
- Manager: Graeme Lee
- League: Northern Premier League Premier Division
- 2025–26: Northern Premier League Premier Division, 17th of 21
- Website: www.whitbytownfc.com
Home colours	Away colours

Whitby Town Football Club is an English football club based in Whitby, North Yorkshire. The club participates in the Northern Premier League, the seventh tier of English football. Founded in 1880, Whitby are one of the oldest clubs from the North Riding of Yorkshire. The club has spent their entire history in the amateur and semi-professional leagues, though they reached the second round of the FA Cup in both 1983–84 and 1985–86.

The level which the club are at now is the highest they have been throughout their history, rising up from the lower sections of non-league football during the 1990s, winning the Northern Premier League First Division on the way as well as the Northern League Cup six times. However, the formation of the Conference North/South Leagues at step 2 in the non-League pyramid effectively relegated Town back to step 3. Whitby's most prestigious honour is arguably the FA Vase, which they won in 1996–97 after defeating North Ferriby United at Wembley Stadium.

Whitby play their home games at the 3,500 capacity Turnbull Ground on Upgang Lane. The club's colours are somewhat distinct in English football and are intentionally similar to Italian side Sampdoria wearing a blue shirt with a touch of white, black and red.

== History ==
=== Foundation and early years ===
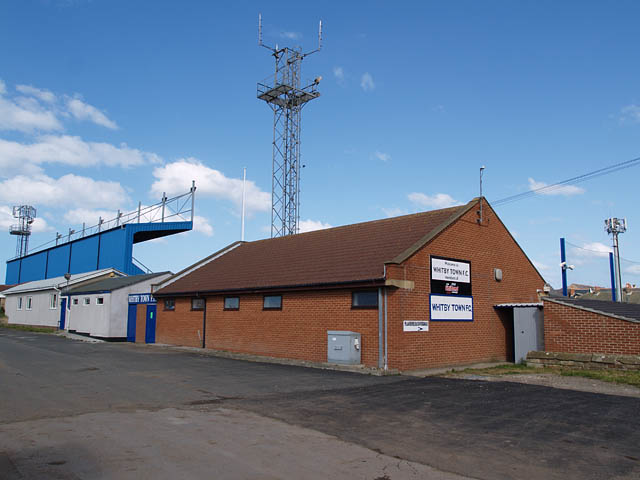
Turnbull Ground, the club's home stadium

The club was founded as Streaneshalch Football Club in October 1880, soon after its foundation the club changed its name to Whitby Church Temperance and played a friendly game against Scarborough on 8 January 1881, which Whitby won 2–0. The name was changed in late 1882 to Whitby Football Club and continued to play friendly games as well as competing in the Scarborough & East Riding County Cup. At this time, rugby football codes were more popular, however, Whitby and some other sides proved to be important in gaining a foothold for the code of association football especially in the North Riding of Yorkshire. The most prominent player of the early years was John Nicholson, who captained the side for nearly a decade.

During this early period, Whitby and Scarborough's rivalry was intense: Whitby beat them in the final of the 1886–87 County Cup, before in the two seasons following Scarborough beat Whitby in the final. There was also a situation in the 1889 FA Cup where Scarborough knocked Whitby out in the First Round, with Whitby complaining that Scarborough's Recreation Ground was an illegal size. Unfortunately, the rivalry culminated in one of the first football riots, after a disagreement about a goal, Whitby players were attacked on the pitch by Scarborough fans and eventually chased out to the Scarborough railway station. Nineteen-year-old Whitby player Albert Drabble, who was attacked at the game, died the following month of a heart attack. Though links between the incidents were not conclusive it put a large shadow over the fixture.

Whitby joined the Northern League for the first time in 1893, only to return to the Cleveland Amateur League two seasons later. They returned to the Northern League in 1899 and won the Second Division the same season. Again, the cost of travelling forced the club to leave the Northern League and for a time Whitby reverted to playing friendlies only, a step which put the club into near obscurity. After the First World War, the town of Whitby had two clubs, both playing in the Scarborough and District League, Whitby Whitehall Swifts and Whitby Town. Ever conscious of Whitby's more illustrious past, the two clubs decided to amalgamate in 1926 as Whitby United. The new club was admitted into the Northern League and the club's name was changed to Whitby Town in 1949.

=== Post-war success ===
The club reached a new height in the Amateur Cup days. In 1964, they reached the quarter finals and the following year they made it all the way to Wembley, losing 3–1 to Hendon. The Northern League Cup has been won six times and the North Riding Senior Cup won on five occasions. Whitby were also successful in the short lived Rothman's National Knockout Cup, winning it in 1976 and 1978.

In 1983–84, Whitby came to national prominence when they came back from two goals down to beat Halifax Town 3–2 in the FA Cup first round proper. They were beaten by a late penalty at Wigan in the following round. The same season, Whitby reached the quarter-finals of the FA Trophy for the first time losing to Dagenham in a replay.

In 1992–93, Whitby Town won the Northern League Championship for the first time in their history. Unfortunately due to circumstances completely beyond their control, the club were denied promotion to the Northern Premier League.

=== First Harry Dunn era ===
In December 1995, the club appointed Harry Dunn as manager. By the end of the season, he had taken Whitby to another Northern League Cup Final victory.

The following season, 1996–97, the Club went from strength to strength. A 0–0 draw against Hull City in the first round proper of the FA Cup, was played at Scarborough on police advice, in a remarkable replay at Boothferry Park, Whitby came from behind to take a 4–3 lead which was held until the dying moments of the game. With only 49 seconds remaining, Hull levelled the score and went on to win 8–4 in extra time. Superior fitness told in the end. This was to be one of only five defeats in the entire season.

The club came from behind in the Northern League race, winning the Championship in style from neighbours, Billingham Synthonia, before completing an amazing "double" by winning the FA Vase at Wembley, beating North Ferriby United 3–0.

The following season, 1997–98, saw continued success at the Turnbull Ground when the club won the Northern Premier League First Division Championship by a margin of 7 points at their first attempt as well as beating York City 3–0 in the final of the North Riding Senior Cup to become holders for a fifth time. Whitby again reached the final of the NRSC in 1999 only for York to gain revenge by winning 4–2. In the 1999–2000 season, the Seasiders finished 12th in the Northern Premier League and were beaten finalists in the President's Cup, losing over two legs to Trafford after a penalty shootout.

The 2001–02 season saw Whitby finish in a disappointing 15th in the league, but got to the FA Cup 1st round for the 7th time, only to lose out to Plymouth Argyle after a replay, 3–2. The first game at the Turnbull Ground which finished 1–1 was played in front of the BBC Match of the Day cameras.

The 2003–04 season saw another strong cup run halted at the hands of Hartlepool United, however, the Blues fell to a 4–0 defeat. Whitby also managed to finish in the play-off zone for the new Conference North but went out on penalties to Radcliffe Borough, a team they had beaten 5–0, 6–2 and 1–0 in the regular season.

=== Logan-Nogan years ===
Longtime manager Harry Dunn was replaced by Dave Logan early in season 2004–05 after a string of poor performances. The former Blues stalwart turned the side around as they equalled a club record 19 games without defeat and in the process made the Northern Premier League promotion play-offs. They lost in the semi-final to Farsley Celtic after extra-time. Town also reached the final of the Northern Premier League Challenge Cup but lost in extra time to Matlock Town.

During the 2005–06 season, the club built a new 505-seater West Stand at the Turnbull Ground. In this season, the club finished outside the play-offs in sixth position.

A new era started at the beginning of the 2006–07 season when former Welsh International Lee Nogan took over the reins. David Logan left Whitby Town to pursue a new career North of the border.

Nogan resigned in October 2007 after an uncharacteristically bad start to the season for Whitby. Senior player Phil Brumwell took temporary command of first team affairs, helped out by former Spennymoor and Tow Law stalwart Graeme Clark.

The pair were awarded the job on a permanent basis early in 2008 and remained at the helm going into the 2008–09 season. Later, Brumwell resigned to prolong his playing career in December 2008. Clark appointed Nogan as Assistant manager in his second spell on the coaching staff.

Whitby finished the season fourth-bottom in the Premier Division, and inside the relegation places. However, ground issues with Cammell Laird, meant Whitby avoided a first-ever relegation in their history, at the expense of the Merseyside club.

Clark resigned in the meantime, and the iconic Harry Dunn, sacked from Blyth Spartans despite taking them to the FA Cup third round and earning the Northumberland club £400,000 months earlier, began a second spell as Whitby manager.

=== Second coming of Harry Dunn ===
Dunn, who brought a spell of unprecedented success to Whitby, returned to the club on 14 May 2009, two days after Graeme Clark's resignation and steered Town to a respectable 14th place. This despite looking good for a top half position before an unprecedented number of injuries and suspensions – including three sendings off in one match against Nantwich Town on 2 April 2010 – led to six straight defeats to end the campaign.

On 4 October 2010, Whitby Town announced via the club's website that Harry Dunn had resigned as the club's manager, with assistant Bob Scaife, another ex-boss who took Town to their 1993 Northern League title, taking temporary charge of team affairs. Dunn had stated that he felt that he had taken the club as far as he could. Despite overseeing an unbeaten three match spell, Scaife departed by mutual consent, after a number of volunteers resented him for taking his full contract entitlement, when he was dismissed as manager in 1995.

=== Tommy Cassidy/Darren Williams ===
Former Northern Ireland and Newcastle United player Tommy Cassidy was appointed manager on 20 October 2010. Cassidy, left on 23 October 2011 after a disappointing 3–1 defeat to Woodley Sports and the team mired in the bottom two. Cassidy was replaced by ex-Sunderland stalwart Darren Williams who had only joined the club in August as a player. Williams quickly moved to bring back players who left during Cassidy's reign- popular local lad Ashley Lyth and two-time top goalscorer from midfield, Jimmy Beadle- plus he also brought in experienced strikers Andy Appleby and Jamie Clarke to bolster a struggling forward line, alongside ex-Bolton winger Jeff Smith. With Clarke netting ten vital goals and Beadle firing six in as many games, Whitby stayed up famously on the final day with a 1–0 victory at Buxton, Tom Portas netting the winner.

Williams secured a creditable 12th spot for Whitby in 2013, followed by 9th a year later, Town's best finish for eight seasons. Whitby ended 2014–15 in 13th, but after a poor record of 3 wins in 21 league games, Williams was sacked on 23 November 2015.

=== Chris Hardy ===
Chris Hardy was appointed manager of Whitby Town on 3 December 2015, leaving local rivals Guisborough Town. Hardy's first game ended in a 1–0 defeat to Sutton Coldfield Town but results soon picked up, and Hardy led the side to survival, ensuring the job was done with a 2–1 win over Barwell. The following season saw Whitby miss out on the play-offs by two points, finishing 6th. Off the field, ex-player Eddie MacNamee replaced chairman Graham Manser after 27 years in the role, before Ivor Homer took over in 2020.

Nathan Haslam

On 2 April 2019, the contracts of Chris Hardy and Player/Assistant Manager Lee Bullock were extended by two years, until the end of the 2020–21 season. However, Hardy resigned in summer 2020, with coach Nathan Haslam joining Bullock as joint manager. Lee Bullock resigned his joint managerial role in September 2022, leaving Nathan Haslam in sole charge. Haslam resigned on 9 October 2024, after a poor start to the season, with only three wins in 14 games across all competitions, none of which were at home. Under Haslam, Whitby reached the first round of the FA Cup for the first time in twenty years and won the North Riding Senior Cup

== Current squad ==
As of 19 August 2026

Note: Flags indicate national team as defined under FIFA eligibility rules; some limited exceptions apply. Players may hold more than one non-FIFA nationality.

No.	Pos.	Nation	Player
—	GK	ENG	Jack Norton
—	GK	ENG	George Scaife
—	GK	ENG	Oliver Swan
—	DF	ENG	James Dillon
—	DF	ENG	Leon Gibson-Booth
—	DF	ENG	Stan Hewitt
—	DF	ZIM	Joey Phuthi
—	DF	ENG	Charlie Stirland
—	DF	ENG	Callum Wilson
—	MF	ENG	Tommy Dowson

No.	Pos.	Nation	Player
—	MF	ENG	Muhamet Gashi
—	MF	ENG	Adam Gell
—	MF	ENG	Callum Hickman
—	MF	ENG	Sam Kay
—	MF	ENG	Jack Kilpatrick
—	MF	SCO	Lucas Reed
—	MF	ENG	Ben Turner
—	FW	ENG	Marley Grant
—	FW	ENG	Stuart Rose

== Club officials ==
- Chairman : Ivor Homer
- Secretary: Paul Walker
- Treasurer: Craig Moth
- Manager: Graeme Lee
- Assistant Manager: Denny Ingram
- Goalkeeper Coach: Neil Ince
- Kitman: Mark Bell and Matthew Ayton

== Club records ==
- Best FA Cup performance: Second round, 1983–84, 1985–86
- Best FA Trophy performance: Quarter-finals, 1983–84, 1998–99

== Honours ==
League
Competition		Position	Season
Northern Premier League First Division		Champions	1997–98
Northern League	Division One	Champions	1992–93, 1996–97
Northern League	Division One	Runners-up	1927–28, 1933–34, 1967–68, 1981–82, 1982–83

Cup
Competition	Position	Season
FA Amateur Cup	Runners-up	1964–65
FA Vase	Champions	1996–97
Northern League Cup	Champions	1928–29, 1963–64, 1969–70, 1976–77, 1984–85, 1995–96
Northern League Cup	Runners-up	1931–32, 1982–83, 1989–90, 1994–95
North Riding Senior Cup	Champions	1964–65, 1967–68, 1982–83, 1989–90, 2004–05, 2016–17, 2023–24
North Riding Senior Cup	Runners-up	1928–29, 1938–39, 1958–59, 1966–67, 1975–76, 1985–86, 1998–99, 2001–02
Scarborough & East Riding County Cup	Champions	1886–87: 1889–90
Scarborough & East Riding County Cup	Runners=up	1887–88; 1888–89
Rothmans National & Overseas Cups	Champions	1975–76, 1977–78
