= Stockton F.C. =

English former football club, based in Stockton-on-Tees

- Full name: Stockton Football Club
- Founded: 1882
- Dissolved: 1975; 51 years ago
- Ground: Victoria Ground, Stockton-on-Tees
Home colours

Stockton Football Club was an English football club based in Stockton-on-Tees. The club were known as 'The Ancients' because of their long-standing presence in the town. Their traditional colours were red and black quartered shirts with white shorts.

== History ==
The club was established in 1882, and were founder members of the Northern League in 1889. In 1896–87 they reached the final of the FA Amateur Cup, but lost 4–1 in a replay to Old Carthusians. They won the league in 1897–98, and the following season reached the final of the FA Amateur Cup again, this time winning 1–0 against Harwich & Parkeston.

They won the Cup again in 1902–03, beating Oxford City 1–0 in a replay. In 1906–07 they won the Northern League again and reached the Amateur Cup final for a fourth time, losing 2–1 to Clapton. They reached the final again the following year, but lost 2–1 to Depot Battalion Royal Engineers. A third Amateur Cup was won in 1911–12 with a 1–0 win over Eston United. The club reached the Cup final again in 1925–26, losing 7–1 to Northern Nomads. They won the Northern League title in 1928–29, 1931–32 and 1932–33, also reaching the FA Amateur Cup final in the latter season, losing 4–1 to Kingstonian in a replay.

In 1939 the club switched to the North Eastern League, but it was abandoned due to the outbreak of World War II. After the war they remained in the North Eastern League. They reached the second round of the FA Cup in 1947–48 before losing 2–1 to Notts County in a replay. They won the league in 1950–51, and the following season reached the third round of the FA Cup, again losing to Notts County. Along with many other clubs in the league, they left to join the Midland League in 1958, but it folded after only two seasons, and in 1962 they returned to the reformed North Eastern League. However, it also folded after two seasons. They tried to rejoin the Northern League, but were refused entry and instead played in the Wearside League until joining the North Regional League in 1967, leaving after a single season. They rejoined a reformed Midland League in 1972, but again left after a single season to play in the Northern Alliance before folding in 1975. Their assets were transferred to Norton Cricket Club, who subsequently founded the Norton & Stockton Ancients.

== Honours ==
Stockton's honours
Competition		Titles	Season
FA Amateur Cup		3	1898–99, 1902–03, 1911–12
Northern League	Division One	5	1897–98, 1906–07, 1928–29, 1931–32, 1932–33
Northern League	League Cup	3	1926–27, 1929–30, 1932–33
North Eastern League		1	1950-51
North Riding Senior Cup		1	1960

== Notable former players ==
- (Republic of Ireland) Peter Desmond
- (England) Tommy Thompson
- (England) Bob Chatt
- (England) Jack Vickers
- (England) James Welford
