= Tow Law Town F.C. =

English football club

Coordinates: 54°44′49.58″N 1°49′07.04″W

Tow Law Town
- Full name: Tow Law Town Association Football Club
- Nickname: The Lawyers
- Founded: 1890 (as Tow Law)
- Ground: Ironworks Road; Tow Law; County Durham
- Capacity: 3,000
- Chairman: Steve Moralee
- Manager: Matty Thompson
- League: Northern League Division Two
- 2025–26: Northern League Division Two, 18th of 22
- Website: https://www.towlawtown.co.uk/
| Home colours | Away colours |

Tow Law Town Association Football Club is an English non-League football club from Tow Law, County Durham, currently playing in the Northern League Division One, in the ninth level of the English football league system. The team, nicknamed "The Lawyers", play their home games at Ironworks Road. The club's fans are known as "The Misfits".

The club was founded in 1890 as Tow Law F.C., before adding the Town to their name in 1905, and throughout their history they have played in a number of local leagues including the Auckland and District League, the South Durham Alliance and the Crook and District League, before joining the Northern League in 1920. They have won the Northern League's Division Two twice—in 1988 and 1992—and its Division One on three occasions—in 1924, 1925 and 1995—but they have never been promoted or demoted from the Northern League since joining it more than 90 years ago. Tow Law reached the final of the FA Vase in 1998, having progressed all the way from the first round, but were beaten by Tiverton Town in the final at Wembley Stadium.

== History ==
There was a football team operating in Tow Law as early as 1881, when a vicar captained the team. However, the club still playing today was founded as Tow Law in 1890. The club became one of the founding teams of the Auckland and District League in 1892, and won the Durham Amateur Cup the following year. They then joined the Northern League in 1894. In 1896, they won the Durham Challenge Cup. They left the Northern League, and played in the South Durham Alliance from 1900 to 1905. In 1905, the club changed its name to Tow Law Town which they have stuck with ever since. The club played in the Crook and District League from 1912 until 1914. After the end of World War I in 1918, the club again played in the Auckland and District League until 1920, when they returned to the Northern League where they have played ever since. Tow Law were league winners in consecutive seasons in 1923–24 and 1924–25. They were runners up in 1928–29. In the Second World War they resigned from the Northern League on 20 March 1940 and their record of the season was deleted. They rejoined the league in 1945 on its resumption after the War.

In the 1967–68 season, the club had their best ever run in the FA Cup. After reaching the first round proper, they beat Mansfield Town 5–1 at Ironworks Road, and took Shrewsbury Town to a second round replay after a 1–1 draw at home. The team went into the third round draw and were drawn against Arsenal at home. However this never happened because they were beaten 6–2 by Shrewsbury in the replay. Arsenal were said to be "saved from a fate worse than death – a trip to Tow Law in January."

In 1974, they won the Northern League Cup, beating Ashington 2–1 in the final at Crook. In the summer of 1978, Chris Waddle started playing for the club. In the summer of 1980, while Waddle was working in a sausage factory, he was sold to Newcastle United for the fee of £1,000. Tow Law Town were runners-up in the 1988–89 season, before finally winning the league again in 1994–95, sitting 14 points clear at the end of the season. They missed out on the runners up spot the following year on goal difference. Harry Hodgson had long served as Chairman of the club, but stood down at the end of 1995–96, but as of 2011 he still remains a member of the committee. John Flynn took over as chairman. At the end of 1996–97, Harry Dixon, another long standing official at the club, stood down as treasurer, but stayed on as the club's president. Kevin McCormick took over as treasurer.

The club made their first and so far only visit to Wembley Stadium on 9 May 1998, by winning through to the final of the FA Vase, under the management of Peter Quigley and his assistant Tony Heslop. They reached the final, beating Taunton Town 5–4 on aggregate in a two legged semi-final. In reaching the final, Tow Law, with its population of only 2,200, became the smallest town to ever reach a Wembley final. The team took around 4,000 supporters with them down to London, about twice the population of Tow Law at the time. They were beaten in the final 1–0 by Tiverton Town.

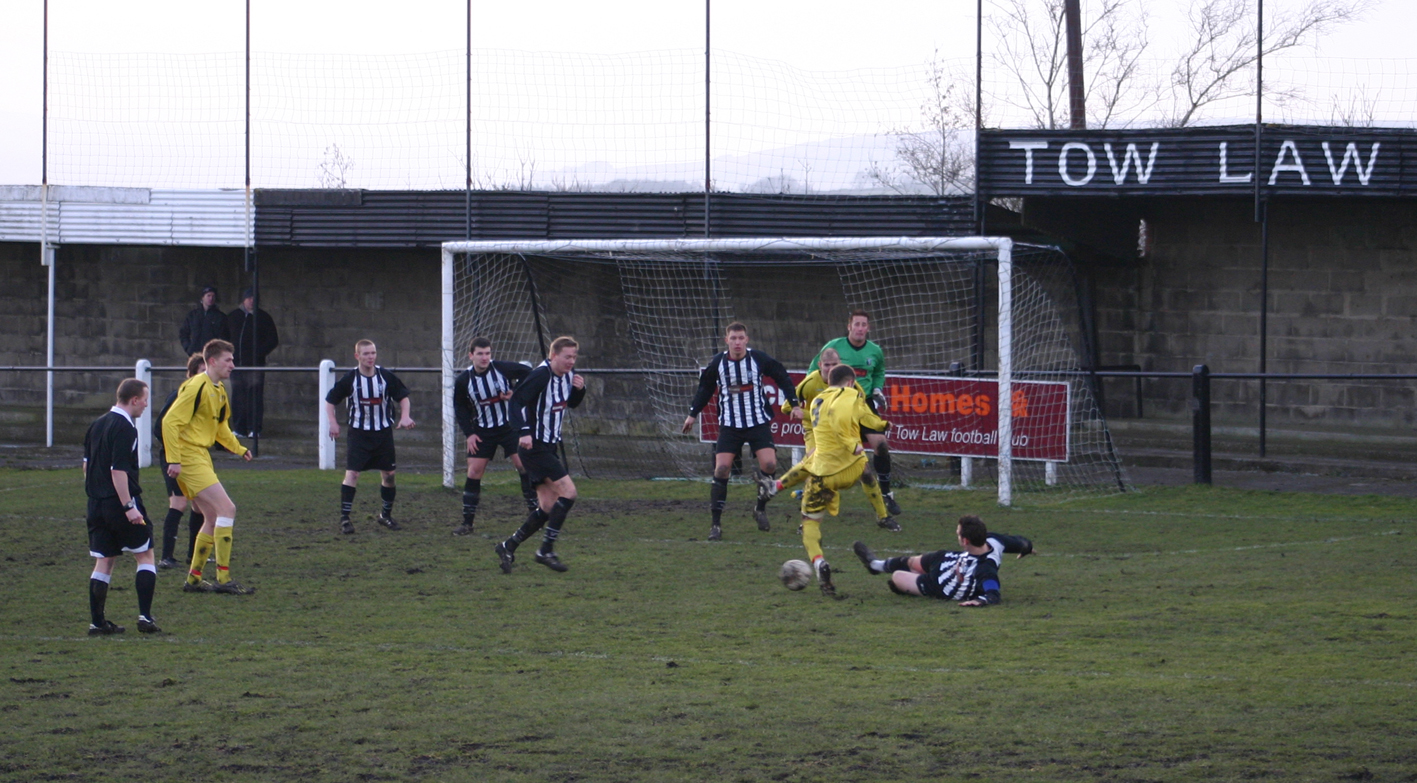
Tow Law Town (black and white stripe shirts) playing Whitley Bay in January 2009

They finished second in the league in 1998–99 and 2001–02. With Harry Dixon's death in 2002, Harry Hodgson took up the post of President. In 2004, John Flynn stood down as chairman, and so for a year long period, Hodgson took up the title of club chairman as well. At the end of the 2004–05 season, he retired from the club. His replacement, Sandra Gordon, is still chair at the club. She is the first ever female chair of the club, and only the third in the history of the Northern League. In 2007, Bernard Fairbairn, who had followed his father and grandfather into the job, stood down as club secretary, a post he had held since 1961, giving him a total of 46 years in his position. Stephen Moralee has now taken over as club secretary.

Sir Bobby Robson was raised a few miles away from Tow Law, in the village of Langley Park. He had held the title of life president at the club, and had helped them out when they hit financial difficulties after the 2001 foot and mouth crisis, which devastated the local area. He was known to spend a lot of time on the club, attending fund raisers and giving talks. On 1 August 2009, the club held a minute's silence before their game with Workington, following his death the day before.

At the end of the 2009–10 season, manager Dave Hagan and his assistant Eric Tate left the club. Hagan felt he could not operate a competitive team on the team's small budget, and so took up an assistant job at Consett. Ian Davison, a player at the club, took up managerial duties, acting as a player-manager, and appointing Gary Innes as his assistant. Steve Murray is the current Tow Law manager, taking up the role in December 2014.

== Colours and crest ==
Tow Law Town's home colours have traditionally been vertical black and white stripes with black shorts and socks. This is common amongst clubs in the North East of England; Premier League club Newcastle United play in black and white, but locally Spennymoor Town, Darlington, Ponteland United and Ashington also wear black and white kits. Tow Law Town's away strips consist of blue and red halves with blue shorts and socks. Between 2006 and 2009, the club were sponsored by McInerney Homes, in a £5,000 a year deal. In August 2010, local company Bodywork Direct took over the club shirt sponsorship deal. The club was then sponsored by local firm Tow Law Plastering Services ltd. As of January 2020, the club's shirt sponsor is Tow Law Plastering Services Ltd. From June 2020, onwards the YouTuber WorkTheSpace is the shirt sponsor.

The club's crest features a colliery headframe, reflecting the strong history of coal mining in County Durham.

== Supporters and rivalries ==
Followers of Tow Law Town are known as the Misfits. In the club's run up to the FA Vase final in 1998, they left a "trail of devastation" in towns as they progressed through the rounds of competition. In 2007, a group of hooligans affiliating themselves with the Misfits caused trouble in Tow Law. However, not all of the club's fans are hooligans and on a number of occasions supporters have partaken in fund raising activities to raise money for the club. In April 2003, two supporters took part in a coast to coast bike ride in the hope of raising around £800 for the club. In July 2010, a group of the club's supporters took part in a ten-mile sponsored walk to raise £3,000 for the club, which at the time was in financial difficulty. In April 2011, two fans of the club from Genoa, Italy, traveled over 1,000 miles to Tow Law to see the club play. They said the club had "captured [their] imagination" with their cup runs in 1967 and 1998.

Tow Law's main local rivals are Consett, based only 7.5 miles (12.1 km) away from each other, the two having played together in the Northern League since 1970.

== Club records ==
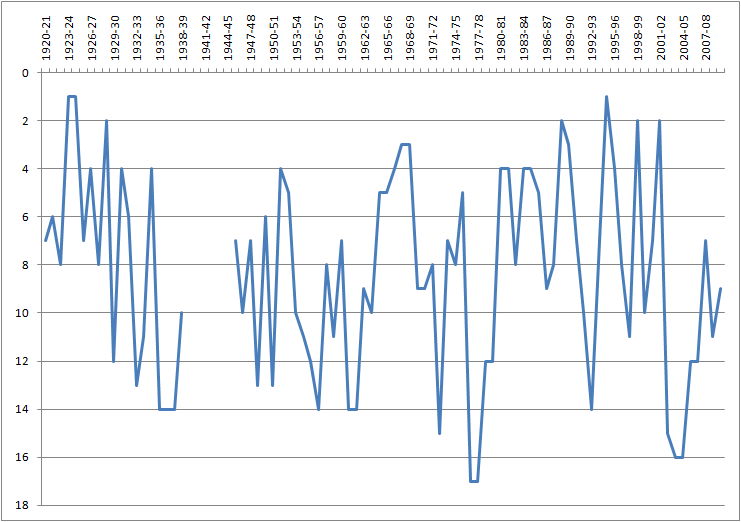
Tow Law Town's results since joining the Northern League in 1920. Football was not played from 1939 until 1945 because of the Second World War

Tow Law Town's best ever league finish has been three wins of the Northern League Division One (level 9 of the overall English football league system) in 1923–24, 1924–25 and 1994–95. The Lawyers have only ever progressed as far as the rounds proper of the FA Cup four times, reaching the first round in 1968–69, 1984–85 and 1989–90, and the second round in 1967–68 where they held Shrewsbury Town to a 1–1 draw at home but lost the replay 2–6.

The club have only reached the rounds proper of the FA Trophy on four occasions, the first round in 1977–78 and 1990–91, and the second round in 1982–83, where they were beaten 0–3 by Altrincham after taking them to a replay, and in 1989–90, when they were beaten 0–2 by Bath City. They have twice reached the third round of the FA Amateur Cup, the first in 1969–70 when they were beaten 0–4 by St Albans City, and the second the following year in 1970–71 when they took Skelmersdale United to a replay and were beaten 0–1. Tow Law reached the final of the FA Vase in 1997–98 but lost 1–0 to Tiverton Town at Wembley Stadium.

The highest attendance figure recorded at Ironworks Road came when the team played Mansfield Town in the FA Cup first round in the 1967–68 season in front of a crowd of 5,500 people.

== Current staff ==
A list of the current backroom staff at the club.

| Position | Name |
|---|---|
| Manager | Matty Thompson |
| Assistant Manager | |
| Chairperson | Steve Moralee |
| President | Lady Elsie Robson |
| Vice-president | Vacant |

== Records ==
=== Tow Law FC ===
- Best FA Cup performance: Fourth qualifying round, 1895–96

=== Tow Law Town FC ===
- Best FA Cup performance: Second round, 1967–68 (replay)
- Best FA Trophy performance: Second round, 1982–83 (replay), 1989–90
- Best FA Vase performance: Runners-up, 1997–98
- Best FA Amateur Cup performance: Third round, 1928–29, 1929–30, 1946–47, 1969–70, 1970–71 (replay)

== Honours ==
The following are the honours Tow Law have achieved since their foundation in 1890.

=== League ===
| Competition | | Position | Titles | Season |
|---|---|---|---|---|
| Northern League | Division One | Champions | 3 | 1923–24, 1924–25, 1994–95 |
| Northern League | Division One | Runners-up | 4 | 1928–29, 1988–89, 1998–99, 2001–02 |

=== Cup ===
| Competition | Position | Titles | Season |
|---|---|---|---|
| FA Vase | Runners-up | 1 | 1997–98 |
| Northern League Cup | Champions | 1 | 1973-74 |
| Northern League Cup | Runners-up | 5 | 1947–48, 1951–52, 1968–69, 1988–89, 1997–98 |
| Durham Challenge Cup | Champions | 1 | 1895-96 |
| Durham Amateur Cup | Champions | 1 | 1892-93 |
| J.R. Cleator Memorial Cup | Champions | 1 | 1994-95 |
| Ernest Armstrong Memorial Trophy | Champions | 5 | 1997–98, 1998–99, 1999–2000, 2000–01, 2001–02 |
| Rothmans Overseas Cup | Champions | 1 | 1976-77 |

== Former players ==
1. Players that have played/managed in the Football League or any foreign equivalent to this level (i.e. fully professional league).
2. Players with full international caps.
3. Players that hold a club record or have captained the club.

- (England) Kevin Dixon
- (England) Steve Howard
- (England) Chris Waddle
- (England) Brian Wake
- (England) Joe Wilson

For a full list see the category page - Category:Tow Law Town F.C. players
