= Stanley United F.C. =

English football club

Stanley United Football Club were an English association football club which participated in the Northern League from 1910 to 1974. The club also participated in the Wearside League from 1988 to 2003. They reached the FA Cup First Round Proper in the 1954–55 season, losing 5–3 to Crook Town,

== Honours ==
- Northern League
  - Champions: 1945–46, 1961–62, 1963–64
  - Runners-up: 1962–63
- Wearside League Division Two
  - Runners-up: 1995–96

== Former players ==
1, Players that have played/managed in the Football League or any foreign equivalent to this level (i.e., fully professional league),
2, Players with full international caps,
3, Players that hold a club record or have captained the club,

- (England) John Brown
- (England) Harry Clarke
- (England) Geoff Strong
- (England) Reuben Vine
- (England) Joe Wilson
