= List of FA Vase finals =

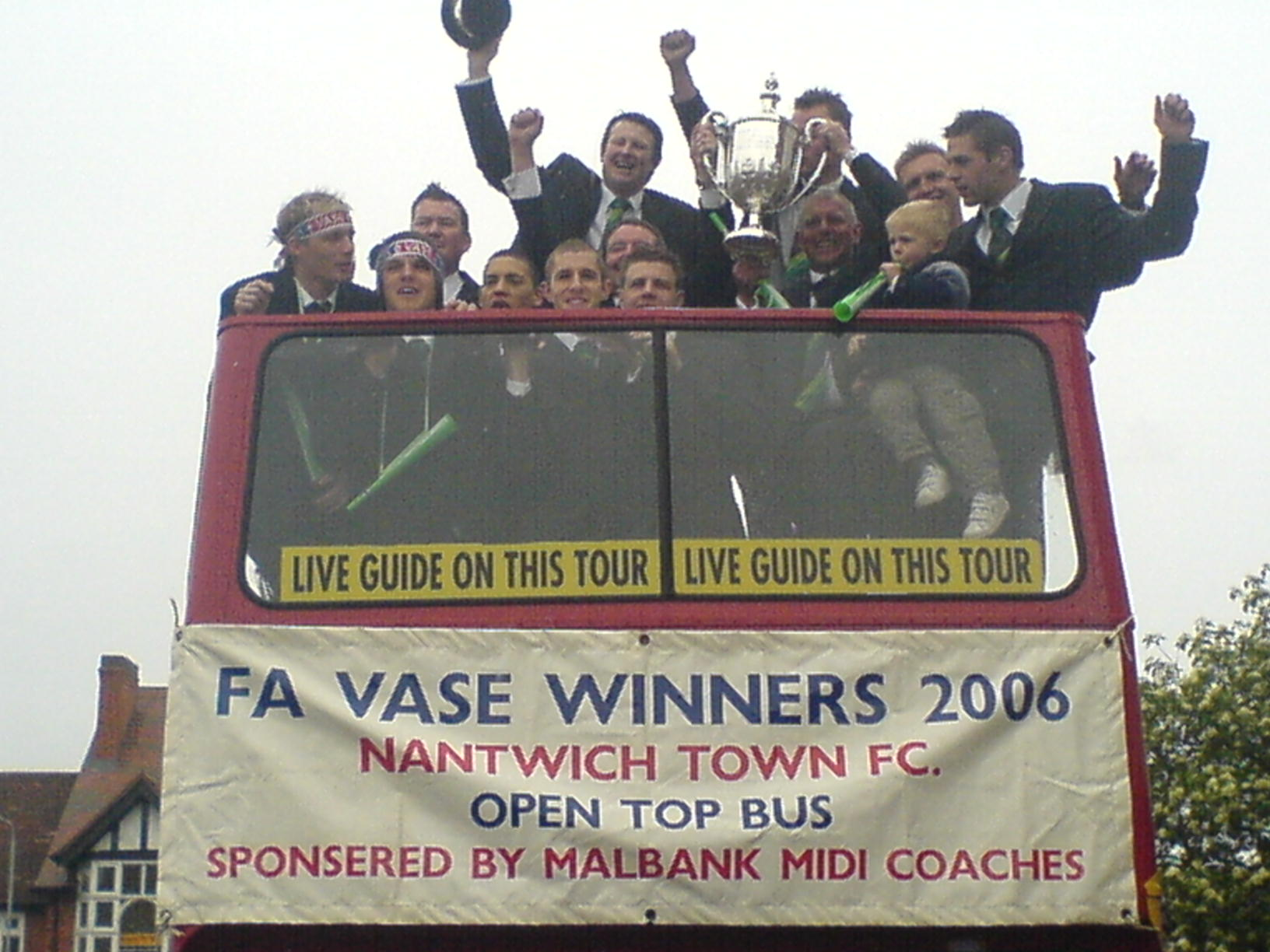
Nantwich Town, the 2006 FA Vase winners, display the trophy during a celebratory parade

The Football Association Challenge Vase, commonly known as the FA Vase, is a knockout cup competition in English football, organised by and named after The Football Association (the FA). It was staged for the first time in the 1974–75 season, effectively replacing the FA Amateur Cup, which was discontinued after the abolition of official amateur status by the FA. While the leading teams from the Amateur Cup switched to the existing FA Trophy, the lower-level teams entered the new FA Vase. The Vase is open to all clubs in levels five to seven of the National League System, equivalent to levels nine to eleven of the overall English football league system, although clubs from other leagues may apply to enter if their stadiums meet certain requirements.

The record for the most wins is held by Whitley Bay, with four victories. Whitley Bay have also won in three consecutive seasons. Billericay Town, Halesowen Town and Tiverton Town have each won the Vase in two consecutive seasons. The Vase is currently held by A.F.C. Stoneham, who beat Cockfosters in the 2026 final.

== History ==
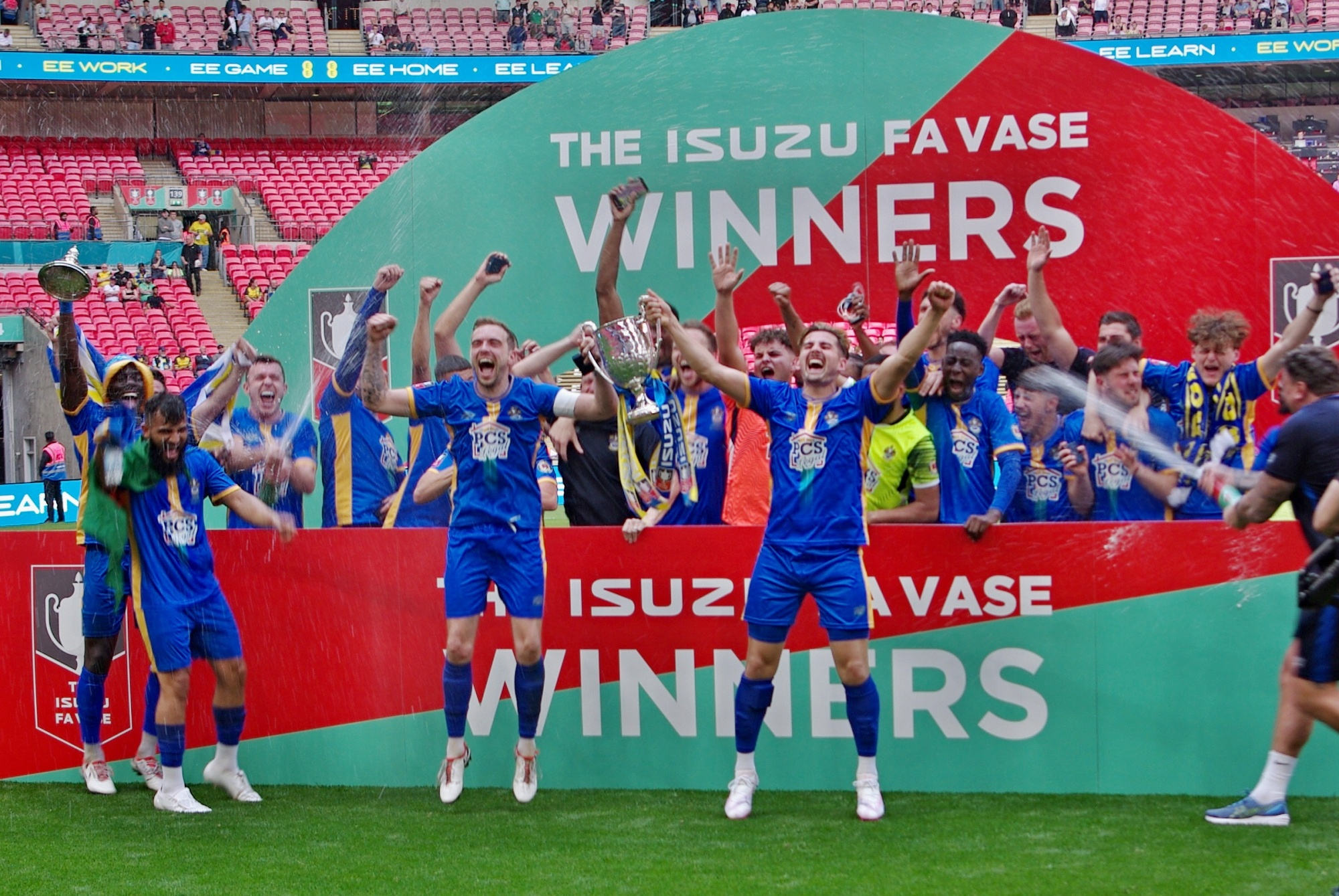
Romford celebrate winning the 2024 final

The first FA Vase final was won by Hoddesdon Town of the Spartan League who, despite being regarded as underdogs, beat Epsom & Ewell of the Surrey Senior League. In three of the four following seasons, Billericay Town won the competition to become the first team to win the Vase on three occasions, a feat matched in 2010 by Whitley Bay. During the 1980s, the tournament was won by teams that represented many different leagues from all parts of the country, from Whickham of the Wearside League in the northeast to Forest Green Rovers of the Hellenic League in the south. Halesowen Town became the second team to win the Vase in consecutive seasons, with victories in 1985 and 1986.

In the 1990s, Guiseley and Tiverton Town both appeared in the final more than once. Tiverton became the third club to win consecutive finals, emerging victorious in 1998 and 1999. Two years later Taunton Town won the Vase, giving clubs from the Western League three wins in four seasons. From 2009 to 2018, all ten finals involved a team from Northern League Division One, with eight of them taking the trophy. Brigg Town of the Northern Counties East League became the fourth club to win the Vase more than once in 2003, seven years after the club's first victory, and six years later Whitley Bay became the fifth club to achieve the feat. In 2019 AFC Fylde (formerly known as Kirkham & Wesham) became the first team to have won both the FA Trophy and FA Vase.

== Finals ==
Originally, if the final finished with the scores level after extra time, the teams would play again in a replay at a later date; more recently the final has always been decided on the day, with a penalty shootout as required. The winning club receives the FA Vase itself and, as of 2010, prize money of £20,000, in addition to that accumulated for winning earlier rounds.

=== Key ===
(R)	Replay
*	Match went to extra time
†	Match decided by a penalty shoot-out without extra time

=== Results ===
Season	Winners	Score	Runners–up	Venue
1974–75	Hoddesdon Town	2–1	Epsom & Ewell	Wembley Stadium (original)
1975–76	Billericay Town	1–0*	Stamford	Wembley Stadium (original)
1976–77	Billericay Town	1–1*	Sheffield	Wembley Stadium (original)
1976–77 (R)	Billericay Town	2–1	Sheffield	City Ground
1977–78	Blue Star	2–1	Barton Rovers	Wembley Stadium (original)
1978–79	Billericay Town	4–1	Almondsbury Greenway	Wembley Stadium (original)
1979–80	Stamford	2–0	Guisborough Town	Wembley Stadium (original)
1980–81	Whickham	3–2*	Willenhall Town	Wembley Stadium (original)
1981–82	Forest Green Rovers	3–0	Rainworth Miners Welfare	Wembley Stadium (original)
1982–83	VS Rugby	1–0	Halesowen Town	Wembley Stadium (original)
1983–84	Stansted	3–2	Stamford	Wembley Stadium (original)
1984–85	Halesowen Town	3–1	Fleetwood Town	Wembley Stadium (original)
1985–86	Halesowen Town	3–0	Southall	Wembley Stadium (original)
1986–87	St Helens Town	3–2	Warrington Town	Wembley Stadium (original)
1987–88	Colne Dynamoes	1–0*	Emley	Wembley Stadium (original)
1988–89	Tamworth	1–1*	Sudbury Town	Wembley Stadium (original)
1988–89 (R)	Tamworth	3–0	Sudbury Town	London Road
1989–90	Yeading	0–0*	Bridlington Town	Wembley Stadium (original)
1989–90 (R)	Yeading	1–0*	Bridlington Town	Elland Road
1990–91	Guiseley	4–4*	Gresley Rovers	Wembley Stadium (original)
1990–91 (R)	Guiseley	3–1	Gresley Rovers	Bramall Lane
1991–92	Wimborne Town	5–3	Guiseley	Wembley Stadium (original)
1992–93	Bridlington Town	1–0	Tiverton Town	Wembley Stadium (original)
1993–94	Diss Town	2–1*	Taunton Town	Wembley Stadium (original)
1994–95	Arlesey Town	2–1	Oxford City	Wembley Stadium (original)
1995–96	Brigg Town	3–0	Clitheroe	Wembley Stadium (original)
1996–97	Whitby Town	3–0	North Ferriby United	Wembley Stadium (original)
1997–98	Tiverton Town	1–0	Tow Law Town	Wembley Stadium (original)
1998–99	Tiverton Town	1–0	Bedlington Terriers	Wembley Stadium (original)
1999–2000	Deal Town	1–0	Chippenham Town	Wembley Stadium (original)
2000–01	Taunton Town	2–1	Berkhamsted Town	Villa Park
2001–02	Whitley Bay	1–0*	Tiptree United	Villa Park
2002–03	Brigg Town	2–1	A.F.C. Sudbury	Boleyn Ground
2003–04	Winchester City	2–0	A.F.C. Sudbury	St Andrew's
2004–05	Didcot Town	3–2	A.F.C. Sudbury	White Hart Lane
2005–06	Nantwich Town	3–1	Hillingdon Borough	St Andrew's
2006–07	Truro City	3–1	A.F.C. Totton	Wembley Stadium (new)
2007–08	Kirkham & Wesham	2–1	Lowestoft Town	Wembley Stadium (new)
2008–09	Whitley Bay	2–0	Glossop North End	Wembley Stadium (new)
2009–10	Whitley Bay	6–1	Wroxham	Wembley Stadium (new)
2010–11	Whitley Bay	3–2	Coalville Town	Wembley Stadium (new)
2011–12	Dunston UTS	2–0	West Auckland Town	Wembley Stadium (new)
2012–13	Spennymoor Town	2–1	Tunbridge Wells	Wembley Stadium (new)
2013–14	Sholing	1–0	West Auckland Town	Wembley Stadium (new)
2014–15	North Shields	2–1*	Glossop North End	Wembley Stadium (new)
2015–16	Morpeth Town	4–1	Hereford	Wembley Stadium (new)
2016–17	South Shields	4–0	Cleethorpes Town	Wembley Stadium (new)
2017–18	Thatcham Town	1–0	Stockton Town	Wembley Stadium (new)
2018–19	Chertsey Town	3–1*	Cray Valley Paper Mills	Wembley Stadium (new)
2019–20	Hebburn Town	3–2	Consett	Wembley Stadium (new)
2020–21	Warrington Rylands	3–2	Binfield	Wembley Stadium (new)
2021–22	Newport Pagnell Town	3–0	Littlehampton Town	Wembley Stadium (new)
2022–23	Ascot United	1–0	Newport Pagnell Town	Wembley Stadium (new)
2023–24	Romford	3–0	Great Wakering Rovers	Wembley Stadium (new)
2024–25	Whitstable Town	2–1*	AFC Whyteleafe	Wembley Stadium (new)
2025–26	A.F.C. Stoneham	0–0†	Cockfosters	Wembley Stadium (new)

== Results by team ==
Teams shown in italics are no longer in existence. Teams shown in bold compete in the Premier League or the English Football League as of 2026 and therefore do not enter the FA Vase or FA Trophy.

Club	Wins	Last final won	Runners-up	Last final lost
Whitley Bay	4	2011	0	—
Billericay Town	3	1979	0	—
Tiverton Town	2	1999	1	1993
Halesowen Town	2	1986	1	1983
Brigg Town	2	2003	0	—
Stamford	1	1980	2	1984
Newport Pagnell Town	1	2022	1	2023
Taunton Town	1	2001	1	1994
Bridlington Town	1	1993	1	1990
Guiseley	1	1991	1	1992
A.F.C. Stoneham	1	2026	0	—
Whitstable Town	1	2025	0	—
Romford	1	2024	0	—
Ascot United	1	2023	0	—
Warrington Rylands	1	2021	0	—
Hebburn Town	1	2020	0	—
Chertsey Town	1	2019	0	—
Thatcham Town	1	2018	0	—
South Shields	1	2017	0	—
Morpeth Town	1	2016	0	—
North Shields	1	2015	0	—
Sholing	1	2014	0	—
Spennymoor Town	1	2013	0	—
Dunston UTS	1	2012	0	—
Kirkham & Wesham	1	2008	0	—
Truro City	1	2007	0	—
Nantwich Town	1	2006	0	—
Didcot Town	1	2005	0	—
Winchester City	1	2004	0	—
Deal Town	1	2000	0	—
Whitby Town	1	1997	0	—
Arlesey Town	1	1995	0	—
Diss Town	1	1994	0	—
Wimborne Town	1	1992	0	—
Yeading	1	1990	0	—
Tamworth	1	1989	0	—
Colne Dynamoes	1	1988	0	—
St Helens Town	1	1987	0	—
Stansted	1	1984	0	—
VS Rugby	1	1983	0	—
Forest Green Rovers	1	1982	0	—
Whickham	1	1981	0	—
Newcastle Blue Star	1	1978	0	—
Hoddesdon Town	1	1975	0	—
A.F.C. Sudbury	0	—	3	2005
Glossop North End	0	—	2	2015
West Auckland Town	0	—	2	2014
Cockfosters	0	—	1	2026
AFC Whyteleafe	0	—	1	2025
Great Wakering Rovers	0	—	1	2024
Littlehampton Town	0	—	1	2022
Binfield	0	—	1	2021
Consett	0	—	1	2020
Cray Valley Paper Mills	0	—	1	2019
Stockton Town	0	—	1	2018
Hereford	0	—	1	2016
Tunbridge Wells	0	—	1	2013
Coalville Town	0	—	1	2011
Wroxham	0	—	1	2010
Lowestoft Town	0	—	1	2008
A.F.C. Totton	0	—	1	2007
Hillingdon Borough	0	—	1	2006
Tiptree United	0	—	1	2002
Berkhamsted Town	0	—	1	2001
Chippenham Town	0	—	1	2000
Bedlington Terriers	0	—	1	1999
Tow Law Town	0	—	1	1998
North Ferriby United	0	—	1	1997
Clitheroe	0	—	1	1996
Oxford City	0	—	1	1995
Gresley Rovers	0	—	1	1991
Sudbury Town	0	—	1	1989
Emley	0	—	1	1988
Warrington Town	0	—	1	1987
Southall	0	—	1	1986
**Fleetwood Town**	0	—	1	1985
Rainworth Miners Welfare	0	—	1	1982
Willenhall Town	0	—	1	1981
Guisborough Town	0	—	1	1980
Almondsbury Greenway	0	—	1	1979
Barton Rovers	0	—	1	1978
Sheffield	0	—	1	1977
Epsom & Ewell	0	—	1	1975
