= 2018–19 FA Cup qualifying rounds =

Tournament details
- Country: England; Wales

The 2018–19 FA Cup qualifying rounds open the 138th season of competition in England for The Football Association Challenge Cup (FA Cup), the world's oldest association football single knockout competition. A total of 736 teams were accepted for the competition, one fewer than the previous year's 737.

The large number (644) of non-League teams entering the tournament, from (Levels 5 to 10) in the English football pyramid, required the competition to start with six rounds of preliminary (2) and qualifying (4) knockout matches. The 32 winning teams from the fourth qualifying round progressed to the First round proper, where League teams tiered at Levels 3 and 4 entered the competition.

== Calendar ==
The calendar for the 2018–19 FA Cup qualifying rounds, as announced by The Football Association.

Round	Main date	Leagues entering at this round	New entries this round	Winners from previous round	Number of fixtures	Prize fund	
Round	Main date	Leagues entering at this round	New entries this round	Winners from previous round	Number of fixtures	Losing club	Winning club
Extra preliminary round	11 August 2018	Levels 8–10	368	none	184	£ 750	£ 2,250
Preliminary round	25 August 2018	Level 7 (promoted clubs); Level 8	136	184	160	£ 960	£ 2,890
First qualifying round	8 September 2018	Level 7	72	160	116		£ 6,000
Second qualifying round	22 September 2018	National League North; National League South	44	116	80		£ 9,000
Third qualifying round	6 October 2018	none	none	80	40		£ 15,000
Fourth qualifying round	20 October 2018	National League	24	40	32		£ 25,000

== Extra preliminary round ==
The extra preliminary round fixtures were played on Friday 10, Saturday 11 and Sunday 12 August 2018; replays were to take place no later than Thursday 16 August 2018. The draw was held on Friday 6 July 2018. A total of 368 teams, from Level 8, Level 9 and Level 10 of English football, entered at this stage of the competition. The round included 80 teams from Level 10 of English football, the lowest ranked clubs to compete in the tournament.

Tie	Home team (Tier)	Score	Away team (Tier)	Att.
Friday 10 August 2018
69	Thetford Town (9)	1–0	Fakenham Town (10)	170
102	Winslow United (10)	2–2	Easington Sports (10)	351
169	Ascot United (9)	2–1	Camberley Town (9)	277
Saturday 11 August 2018
1	Consett (9)	2–1	North Shields (9)	292
2	Thackley (9)	2–3	Whitley Bay (9)	131
3	Hebburn Town (9)	2–3	Dunston UTS (9)	233
4	Ashington (9)	0–2	Knaresborough Town (9)	185
5	Goole (9)	1–5	Morpeth Town (8)	171
6	Glasshoughton Welfare (10)	1–2	Blyth (9)	106
7	Newcastle Benfield (9)	1–1	Stockton Town (9)	186
8	Selby Town (10)	3–2	Whickham (9)	160
9	Seaham Red Star (9)	1–1	Heaton Stannington (10)	76
10	Team Northumbria (9)	W.O.	Shildon (9)	-
Walkover for Shildon as Team Northumbria became ineligible after withdrawing from the Northern League.
11	Northallerton Town (10)	0–4	Garforth Town (9)	110
12	Guisborough Town (9)	3–3	Newton Aycliffe (9)	144
13	Barnoldswick Town (9)	1–1	Billingham Synthonia (10)	157
14	Washington (10)	0–4	West Auckland Town (9)	102
15	Sunderland RCA (9)	5–2	Ryhope Colliery Welfare (9)	173
16	Bridlington Town (9)	3–0	Harrogate Railway Athletic (9)	221
17	Penrith (9)	0–3	Albion Sports (9)	106
18	Bishop Auckland (9)	0–2	Pickering Town (8)	321
19	AFC Darwen (10)	3–1	Barnton (10)	89
20	Liversedge (9)	5–2	Padiham (9)	121
21	City of Liverpool (9)	3–1	Silsden (9)	630
22	AFC Liverpool (10)	2–2	Ashton Athletic (9)	139
23	Widnes (8)	1–1	Northwich Victoria (9)	126
24	Burscough (9)	2–2	1874 Northwich (9)	150
25	Congleton Town (9)	1–0	Eccleshill United (9)	147
26	Prestwich Heys (10)	2–1	Abbey Hey (9)	188
27	West Didsbury & Chorlton (9)	2–3	Squires Gate (9)	214
28	Winsford United (9)	1–2	Irlam (9)	148
29	Penistone Church (9)	2–1	Bootle (9)	165
30	Hemsworth Miners Welfare (9)	1–1	Runcorn Town (9)	130
32	Maltby Main (9)	3–0	Athersley Recreation (9)	99
33	Parkgate (10)	2–0	Sandbach United (10)	89
34	Litherland REMYCA (9)	W.O.	Charnock Richard (9)	126
Walkover for Charnock Richard as Litherland REMYCA fielded an ineligible player in their 4-2 win.
35	Maine Road (10)	0–1	Handsworth Parramore (9)	122
36	Walsall Wood (9)	1–1	Worcester City (9)	187
37	Highgate United (9)	1–0	AFC Wulfrunians (9)	74
38	Boldmere St. Michaels (9)	2–2	Malvern Town (10)	133
39	Atherstone Town (10)	1–1	Hanley Town (9)	178
40	Stourport Swifts (9)	2–1	Shawbury United (10)	124
41	Wednesfield (10)	2–1	Rocester (10)	40
43	Coventry Sphinx (9)	0–1	Whitchurch Alport (9)	175
44	Haughmond (10)	2–0	Wolverhampton Sporting (9)	56
45	Racing Club Warwick (10)	4–3	Coleshill Town (8)	249
46	Romulus (9)	6–1	Westfields (9)	72
47	Ellesmere Rangers (10)	0–1	Leicester Road (10)	73
48	Sporting Khalsa (9)	2–1	Tividale (10)	125
49	Long Eaton United (9)	2–1	St Andrews (10)	54
50	Sleaford Town (9)	0–1	South Normanton Athletic (9)	112
51	Heather St John's (10)	3–6	Kimberley Miners Welfare (10)	73
52	Kirby Muxloe (9)	0–6	AFC Mansfield (8)	83
53	Clipstone (10)	0–0	Barton Town (9)	84
54	Lutterworth Town (10)	2–1	Heanor Town (10)	216
55	Hinckley (10)	1–1	Anstey Nomads (10)	218
56	Worksop Town (9)	3–3	Shepshed Dynamo (9)	341
57	Rainworth Miners Welfare (10)	2–1	Dunkirk (9)	78
58	Staveley Miners Welfare (9)	4–2	Boston Town (9)	161
59	Teversal (10)	1–2	Loughborough University (9)	74
60	Oadby Town (9)	3–1	Shirebrook Town (10)	147
61	Bottesford Town (9)	3–1	Radford (10)	84
62	Quorn (9)	6–1	Belper United (10)	127
63	Leicester Nirvana (9)	0–3	Grimsby Borough (10)	63
64	Cogenhoe United (9)	1–2	Wisbech Town (8)	147
65	Wellingborough Whitworth (9)	0–1	Harborough Town (9)	51
66	Deeping Rangers (9)	3–2	Holbeach United (9)	182
67	Raunds Town (10)	1–2	Eynesbury Rovers (9)	73
68	Arlesey Town (9)	3–4	Desborough Town (9)	125
70	Northampton Sileby Rangers (10)	2–0	Ely City (9)	114
71	Godmanchester Rovers (9)	2–0	Newport Pagnell Town (9)	103
72	Biggleswade United (9)	1–1	Wellingborough Town (9)	88
73	Histon (9)	6–1	Peterborough Northern Star (9)	156
74	Daventry Town (9)	9–2	Potton United (9)	61
75	Biggleswade (9)	2–0	Northampton ON Chenecks (9)	91
76	Swaffham Town (10)	1–3	Yaxley (8)	95
77	Rothwell Corinthians (9)	3–0	Pinchbeck United (9)	60
78	Hullbridge Sports (9)	2–1	Gorleston (9)	113
79	Wroxham (9)	1–1	Saffron Walden Town (9)	126
80	Great Yarmouth Town (9)	1–3	Hadleigh United (9)	86
Match played at Hadleigh United.
81	Walthamstow (9)	3–1	Walsham-le-Willows (9)	78
82	Kirkley & Pakefield (9)	2–2	FC Clacton (9)	94
83	Wodson Park (10)	1–3	Hoddesdon Town (9)	94
84	Tower Hamlets (9)	A–A	Stanway Rovers (9)	50
Match abandoned after 80 minutes due to player unrest on the pitch when the score was 1–3. Match played at Stanway Rovers.
85	Norwich United (9)	1–2	Takeley (9)	85
87	Framlingham Town (9)	1–1	Whitton United (9)	87
88	Southend Manor (9)	1–3	FC Romania (8)	65
89	Wivenhoe Town (10)	0–5	Brantham Athletic (9)	78
90	Stowmarket Town (9)	0–2	Basildon United (8)	282
91	Sporting Bengal United (9)	4–3	Ilford (9)	55
92	Haverhill Rovers (9)	2–0	Haverhill Borough (10)	602
93	Ipswich Wanderers (10)	0–5	Baldock Town (9)	66
94	Barkingside (9)	0–0	Leyton Athletic (9)	50
95	Cockfosters (9)	0–2	Newmarket Town (9)	77
96	Woodbridge Town (9)	2–2	Clapton (9)	117
97	Burnham Ramblers (10)	3–5	West Essex (9)	102
99	Redbridge (9)	1–3	Long Melford (9)	52
100	Oxhey Jets (9)	3–4	Wantage Town (9)	77
101	Tuffley Rovers (9)	1–4	Colney Heath (9)	94
103	Harpenden Town (9)	1–0	Edgware Town (9)	191
104	Hadley (9)	2–0	Fairford Town (9)	66
105	Brackley Town Saints (9)	1–0	London Colney (9)	31
106	London Lions (10)	2–1	Wembley (9)	57
107	Windsor (9)	3–3	Highworth Town (8)	125
108	Bishop's Cleeve (9)	5–2	Stotfold (9)	103
109	AFC Hayes (9)	1–2	Lydney Town (9)	40
110	Flackwell Heath (9)	0–2	North Greenford United (9)	70
111	Tring Athletic (9)	0–2	Berkhamsted (8)	202
113	Holmer Green (9)	0–1	Longlevens (9)	54
114	Ardley United (9)	7–0	Shortwood United (9)	95
115	Holyport (10)	1–2	Brimscombe & Thrupp (9)	89
116	Abingdon United (9)	2–2	Burnham (10)	77
117	Crawley Green (9)	7–1	Woodley United (10)	56
118	Reading City (9)	1–1	Chipping Sodbury Town (9)	146
119	Leighton Town (9)	0–1	Royal Wootton Bassett Town (9)	128

Tie	Home team (Tier)	Score	Away team (Tier)	Att.
120	Arundel (9)	4–1	Chertsey Town (9)	75
122	Broadbridge Heath (9)	0–2	Shoreham (9)	189
124	Bearsted (9)	2–1	Chichester City (9)	156
125	Redhill (9)	1–3	Horley Town (9)	128
126	AFC Croydon Athletic (9)	5–0	Rochester United (10)	58
127	Spelthorne Sports (9)	3–0	Peacehaven & Telscombe (9)	81
128	Hassocks (9)	1–3	Erith Town (9)	62
129	Worthing United (10)	1–1	Littlehampton Town (10)	55
131	Crowborough Athletic (9)	1–1	Hanworth Villa (9)	102
132	Raynes Park Vale (9)	3–0	Lingfield (9)	86
133	AFC Uckfield Town (9)	1–0	Glebe (9)	53
134	Abbey Rangers (9)	0–4	Newhaven (9)	73
135	Cobham (9)	1–0	Sheppey United (9)	80
136	Fisher (9)	1–2	Horsham YMCA (9)	107
137	Loxwood (9)	2–1	Hollands & Blair (9)	80
138	Sevenoaks Town (8)	6–1	Lordswood (9)	131
139	Crawley Down Gatwick (9)	0–1	Three Bridges (8)	118
140	Eastbourne United (9)	0–2	Hackney Wick (10)	69
142	Croydon (9)	2–2	Tunbridge Wells (9)	96
143	Erith & Belvedere (10)	0–0	Saltdean United (9)	55
144	Haywards Heath Town (8)	0–2	Lancing (9)	106
146	East Preston (9)	0–2	Balham (9)	108
147	K Sports (9)	2–2	Pagham (9)	101
148	Deal Town (9)	2–2	Whitstable Town (8)	187
149	Broadfields United (10)	3–0	Banstead Athletic (9)	53
150	Chatham Town (9)	3–1	Walton & Hersham (9)	195
151	Corinthian (9)	3–0	Canterbury City (9)	56
152	Beckenham Town (9)	1–1	Colliers Wood United (9)	70
153	Hamworthy United (9)	3–2	Team Solent (9)	90
154	Melksham Town (8)	4–0	Badshot Lea (9)	238
155	AFC Stoneham (10)	0–0	AFC Portchester (9)	129
156	Newport (IoW) (10)	3–1	Amesbury Town (10)	98
157	Knaphill (9)	0–3	Sholing (9)	100
158	Guildford City (9)	0–1	Petersfield Town (10)	87
159	Tadley Calleva (9)	1–3	Baffins Milton Rovers (9)	187
160	Bemerton Heath Harlequins (9)	1–0	Cowes Sports (9)	51
161	Andover New Street (9)	4–0	Romsey Town (10)	121
162	United Services Portsmouth (10)	5–2	Andover Town (10)	42
163	Horndean (9)	5–0	Godalming Town (10)	75
164	Hamble Club (9)	1–1	Alresford Town (9)	125
165	Farnham Town (10)	1–2	Binfield (9)	57
166	Brockenhurst (9)	2–2	Christchurch (9)	153
167	Bashley (9)	0–2	Bournemouth (9)	148
168	Fareham Town (9)	0–2	Frimley Green (10)	80
170	Sandhurst Town (10)	1–1	Lymington Town (9)	42
171	Clevedon Town (9)	1–2	Portland United (9)	102
172	Westbury United (9)	3–0	Cribbs (9)	58
173	Hallen (9)	0–0	Longwell Green Sports (10)	40
174	Wells City (10)	2–5	Shaftesbury (9)	102
175	Bodmin Town (10)	4–4	Keynsham Town (10)	122
176	Cheddar (10)	3–2	Bridgwater Town (9)	120
177	Shepton Mallet (9)	1–1	Willand Rovers (9)	115
178	Bitton (9)	7–0	Tavistock (10)	200
179	Buckland Athletic (9)	3–0	Pewsey Vale (10)	131
180	Bridport (9)	0–0	Wellington AFC (9)	166
181	Hengrove Athletic (9)	1–5	Plymouth Parkway (9)	62
182	Saltash United (10)	1–0	Odd Down (9)	92
183	Brislington (9)	1–2	Cadbury Heath (9)	57
184	Bradford Town (9)	5–2	Roman Glass St George (9)	109
Sunday 12 August 2018
31	Hallam (10)	0–2	Runcorn Linnets (8)	327
42	Coventry United (9)	1–2	Rugby Town (9)	258
86	St. Margaretsbury (9)	2–0	Enfield 1893 (9)	148
98	Stansted (9)	2–1	Sawbridgworth Town (9)	137
112	Southall (9)	0–1	Leverstock Green (9)	75
121	Sutton Common Rovers (9)	0–2	CB Hounslow United (9)	94
123	Langney Wanderers (9)	1–2	Epsom & Ewell (10)	189
130	Little Common (9)	2–2	Bedfont Sports (8)	102
141	Cray Valley Paper Mills (9)	3–2	Eastbourne Town (9)	147
145	Rusthall (9)	3–0	Wick (10)	152
Tuesday 21 August 2018
84	Tower Hamlets (9)	0–2	Stanway Rovers (9)	60
Match played at Stanway Rovers.
Replays
Tuesday 14 August 2018
12R	Newton Aycliffe (9)	0–2	Guisborough Town (9)	201
22R	Ashton Athletic (9)	4–1	AFC Liverpool (10)	148
24R	1874 Northwich (9)	3–3 (2–4 p)	Burscough (9)	213
36R	Worcester City (9)	1–1 (2–3 p)	Walsall Wood (9)	350
38R	Malvern Town (10)	3–2	Boldmere St. Michaels (9)	203
39R	Hanley Town (9)	1–4	Atherstone Town (10)	105
53R	Barton Town (9)	3–4	Clipstone (10)	136
55R	Anstey Nomads (10)	4–3 (a.e.t.)	Hinckley (10)	237
56R	Shepshed Dynamo (9)	4–5 (a.e.t.)	Worksop Town (9)	207
72R	Wellingborough Town (9)	2–1	Biggleswade United (9)	130
79R	Saffron Walden Town (9)	3–2 (a.e.t.)	Wroxham (9)	272
87R	Whitton United (9)	3–1	Framlingham Town (9)	73
96R	Clapton (9)	1–1 (4–5 p)	Woodbridge Town (9)	66
102R	Easington Sports (10)	2–0	Winslow United (10)	123
116R	Burnham (10)	2–0	Abingdon United (9)	72
118R	Chipping Sodbury Town (9)	2–1 (a.e.t.)	Reading City (9)	92
130R	Bedfont Sports (8)	2–1	Little Common (9)	61
131R	Hanworth Villa (9)	2–0	Crowborough Athletic (9)	110
142R	Tunbridge Wells (9)	2–3 (a.e.t.)	Croydon (9)	162
143R	Saltdean United (9)	2–0	Erith & Belvedere (10)	89
147R	Pagham (9)	2–0	K Sports (9)	116
152R	Colliers Wood United (9)	0–2 (a.e.t.)	Beckenham Town (9)	86
155R	AFC Portchester (9)	0–3	AFC Stoneham (10)	101
164R	Alresford Town (9)	0–2	Hamble Club (9)	92
166R	Christchurch (9)	0–2	Brockenhurst (9)	152
173R	Longwell Green Sports (10)	0–1	Hallen (9)	69
175R	Keynsham Town (10)	1–3	Bodmin Town (10)	139
Wednesday 15 August 2018
7R	Stockton Town (9)	0–3	Newcastle Benfield (9)	269
9R	Heaton Stannington (10)	4–4 (2–4 p)	Seaham Red Star (9)	201
13R	Billingham Synthonia (10)	0–4	Barnoldswick Town (9)	149
23R	Northwich Victoria (9)	1–0 (a.e.t.)	Widnes (8)	132
30R	Runcorn Town (9)	1–0	Hemsworth Miners Welfare (9)	102
94R	Leyton Athletic (9)	3–0	Barkingside (9)	100
107R	Highworth Town (8)	1–2	Windsor (9)	204
129R	Littlehampton Town (10)	2–4 (a.e.t.)	Worthing United (10)	144
148R	Whitstable Town (8)	4–3	Deal Town (9)	236
170R	Lymington Town (9)	5–1	Sandhurst Town (10)	67
177R	Willand Rovers (9)	3–0	Shepton Mallet (9)	157
180R	Wellington AFC (9)	0–3	Bridport (9)	97
Tuesday 21 August 2018
82R	FC Clacton (9)	3–2	Kirkley & Pakefield (9)	114
Match played at Kirkley & Pakefield due to an unplayable pitch at FC Clacton.

== Preliminary round ==
The preliminary round fixtures were played on Friday 24, Saturday 25, Sunday 26 and Monday 27 August 2018; replays were to take place no later than Thursday 6 September 2018. The draw was held on 6 July 2018. A total of 320 clubs took part in this stage of the competition, including the 184 winners from the Extra preliminary round and 136 new clubs: 120 remaining clubs from Level 8 (all except Bracknell Town and Guernsey) and 16 clubs (those, who were promoted from level 8) from Level 7 of English football. The round included 32 teams from Level 10, the lowest-ranked teams still in the competition.

Tie	Home team (Tier)	Score	Away team (Tier)	Att.
Friday 24 August 2018
58	Thetford Town (9)	0–5	Godmanchester Rovers (9)	121
73	Bowers & Pitsea (8)	1–0	Barking (8)	191
74	Coggeshall Town (8)	0–0	Witham Town (8)	309
107	Tooting & Mitcham United (8)	2–1	Horley Town (9)	304
143	United Services Portsmouth (10)	1–3	Sholing (9)	111
Saturday 25 August 2018
1	Knaresborough Town (9)	5–1	Blyth (9)	165
2	Bridlington Town (9)	1–2	Garforth Town (9)	231
3	Dunston UTS (9)	4–2	Pontefract Collieries (8)	241
4	Newcastle Benfield (9)	1–0	West Auckland Town (9)	191
5	Whitley Bay (9)	6–1	Barnoldswick Town (9)	305
6	Morpeth Town (8)	1–0	Marske United (8)	230
7	Consett (9)	5–2	Seaham Red Star (9)	251
8	Tadcaster Albion (8)	4–1	Shildon (9)	302
9	Clitheroe (8)	6–6	Sunderland RCA (9)	230
10	Kendal Town (8)	1–1	Selby Town (10)	125
11	Pickering Town (8)	0–4	Colne (8)	123
12	Albion Sports (9)	2–2	Guisborough Town (9)	120
13	Ashton Athletic (9)	2–1	Skelmersdale United (8)	135
14	Ossett United (8)	2–2	Mossley (8)	432
15	Burscough (9)	2–0	Northwich Victoria (9)	95
16	Atherton Collieries (8)	2–1	Colwyn Bay (8)	184
17	Kidsgrove Athletic (8)	1–1	Ramsbottom United (8)	120
18	Stocksbridge Park Steels (8)	1–3	Bamber Bridge (7)	144
19	Prescot Cables (8)	1–2	Irlam (9)	303
20	Brighouse Town (8)	0–2	Parkgate (10)	121
21	Prestwich Heys (10)	0–2	Radcliffe (8)	513
22	Droylsden (8)	4–4	Squires Gate (9)	164
23	Hyde United (7)	5–1	Sheffield (8)	381
24	Handsworth Parramore (9)	0–1	Congleton Town (9)	138
25	Frickley Athletic (8)	10–1	Liversedge (9)	165
26	Runcorn Linnets (8)	1–2	Maltby Main (9)	256
27	Penistone Church (9)	1–3	Runcorn Town (9)	207
29	AFC Darwen (10)	1–4	Trafford (8)	174
30	City of Liverpool (9)	1–1	Glossop North End (8)	462
31	Stourport Swifts (9)	2–1	Sporting Khalsa (9)	126
32	Sutton Coldfield Town (8)	3–0	Gresley (8)	122
33	Alvechurch (7)	4–3	Bromsgrove Sporting (8)	730
34	Malvern Town (10)	1–2	Racing Club Warwick (10)	230
35	Bedworth United (7)	1–3	Atherstone Town (10)	326
36	Romulus (9)	4–0	Newcastle Town (8)	82
37	Walsall Wood (9)	2–1	Whitchurch Alport (9)	101
38	Highgate United (9)	3–0	Leicester Road (10)	70
39	Wednesfield (10)	2–2	Chasetown (8)	105
40	Rugby Town (9)	1–0	Evesham United (8)	225
41	Haughmond (10)	1–1	Market Drayton Town (8)	98
42	Kimberley Miners Welfare (10)	0–2	Oadby Town (9)	73
43	Loughborough Dynamo (8)	2–4	Bottesford Town (9)	96
44	Staveley Miners Welfare (9)	3–0	Lutterworth Town (10)	220
45	Belper Town (8)	2–1	Lincoln United (8)	266
47	Loughborough University (9)	3–3	Cleethorpes Town (8)	156
48	AFC Mansfield (8)	1–0	Rainworth Miners Welfare (10)	157
49	Anstey Nomads (10)	4–1	Clipstone (10)	252
50	Grimsby Borough (10)	1–0	Long Eaton United (9)	87
51	Quorn (9)	3–2	South Normanton Athletic (9)	121
52	Stamford (8)	1–1	Peterborough Sports (8)	334
53	Northampton Sileby Rangers (10)	1–1	Wisbech Town (8)	109
54	Deeping Rangers (9)	1–1	AFC Rushden & Diamonds (7)	347
55	Harborough Town (9)	1–2	Cambridge City (8)	200
56	Corby Town (8)	3–3	Dunstable Town (8)	372
57	Biggleswade (9)	A–A	Soham Town Rangers (8)	138
Match abandoned after 60 minutes after two Soham Town Rangers players clashed heads when the score was 3–2.
59	Desborough Town (9)	0–3	Kempston Rovers (8)	123
60	Bedford Town (8)	4–1	Dereham Town (8)	252
61	Histon (9)	1–1	Eynesbury Rovers (9)	182
62	Daventry Town (9)	7–5	Yaxley (8)	110
63	Barton Rovers (8)	3–2	Rothwell Corinthians (9)	82
64	Spalding United (8)	3–2	Wellingborough Town (9)	125
65	Waltham Abbey (8)	0–2	Bury Town (8)	128
66	Felixstowe & Walton United (8)	0–1	Walthamstow (9)	305
67	AFC Sudbury (8)	2–0	Mildenhall Town (8)	213
68	Heybridge Swifts (8)	3–0	West Essex (9)	206
69	Aveley (8)	0–2	Potters Bar Town (7)	154
70	Hertford Town (8)	5–3	Tilbury (8)	181
72	Long Melford (9)	3–1	St. Margaretsbury (9)	107
75	Haverhill Rovers (9)	2–1	Maldon & Tiptree (8)	170
76	Brantham Athletic (9)	1–0	Welwyn Garden City (8)	84
77	Haringey Borough (7)	1–0	Stanway Rovers (9)	151
78	Cheshunt (8)	1–0	Canvey Island (8)	151
79	FC Romania (8)	2–0	Grays Athletic (8)	146
80	Woodbridge Town (9)	5–1	Hadleigh United (9)	189
81	Basildon United (8)	2–1	Whitton United (9)	105
82	Great Wakering Rovers (8)	4–1	Leyton Athletic (9)	122
83	FC Clacton (9)	2–4	Ware (8)	143
84	Newmarket Town (9)	2–1	Hullbridge Sports (9)	124
85	Saffron Walden Town (9)	4–1	Hoddesdon Town (9)	293
86	Brentwood Town (8)	1–1	Sporting Bengal United (9)	137
88	Easington Sports (10)	1–2	Chipping Sodbury Town (9)	191
89	Northwood (8)	3–1	Longlevens (9)	107
90	Ardley United (9)	2–4	Burnham (10)	86
91	AFC Dunstable (8)	0–0	Swindon Supermarine (7)	81
92	Crawley Green (9)	2–3	Aylesbury United (8)	90
93	Kidlington (8)	0–1	Marlow (8)	86
94	Thame United (8)	0–2	Berkhamsted (8)	120
95	Bishop's Cleeve (9)	5–2	North Greenford United (9)	93
96	Didcot Town (8)	1–1	Aylesbury (8)	129
98	Slimbridge (8)	1–1	Wantage Town (9)	65
99	Chalfont St Peter (8)	1–0	London Lions (10)	91
100	Beaconsfield Town (7)	2–0	Uxbridge (8)	97
101	Colney Heath (9)	1–3	Cinderford Town (8)	161
102	Harpenden Town (9)	0–6	Leverstock Green (9)	171
103	Brimscombe & Thrupp (9)	0–7	Hayes & Yeading United (8)	106
104	North Leigh (8)	2–4	Hanwell Town (8)	92

Tie	Home team (Tier)	Score	Away team (Tier)	Att.
105	Cirencester Town (8)	5–0	Windsor (9)	128
106	Royal Wootton Bassett Town (9)	0–0	Lydney Town (9)	93
108	East Grinstead Town (8)	1–0	South Park (8)	116
109	Walton Casuals (7)	6–0	Shoreham (9)	172
110	Beckenham Town (9)	2–2	Epsom & Ewell (10)	75
111	Three Bridges (8)	2–3	Phoenix Sports (8)	86
112	Arundel (9)	1–7	Herne Bay (8)	155
113	Sittingbourne (8)	2–0	Bearsted (9)	204
114	Newhaven (9)	0–2	Pagham (9)	107
115	Cobham (9)	1–3	Egham Town (8)	89
117	Molesey (8)	0–0	Lewes (7)	92
118	AFC Croydon Athletic (9)	1–1	Hanworth Villa (9)	71
119	Raynes Park Vale (9)	1–1	Spelthorne Sports (9)	92
120	Carshalton Athletic (7)	0–1	Horsham (8)	274
121	Ashford United (8)	0–2	Horsham YMCA (9)	266
122	AFC Uckfield Town (9)	4–1	Broadfields United (10)	57
123	Greenwich Borough (8)	3–7	Lancing (9)	66
124	Chipstead (8)	0–1	Corinthian (9)	60
125	Loxwood (9)	1–1	Erith Town (9)	76
126	Hythe Town (8)	3–0	Worthing United (10)	191
127	Whyteleafe (8)	1–1	Saltdean United (9)	116
128	Corinthian Casuals (7)	6–0	Croydon (9)	162
129	Ramsgate (8)	2–1	Chatham Town (9)	252
130	CB Hounslow United (9)	0–2	Whitstable Town (8)	116
131	Cray Wanderers (8)	1–1	Rusthall (9)	111
132	Faversham Town (8)	4–1	Hackney Wick (10)	206
133	Balham (9)	0–2	Thamesmead Town (8)	97
134	Hastings United (8)	3–2	VCD Athletic (8)	428
135	Sevenoaks Town (8)	1–0	Bedfont Sports (8)	129
136	Thatcham Town (8)	0–0	Bemerton Heath Harlequins (9)	167
137	Salisbury (7)	6–0	Hamble Club (9)	542
138	Binfield (9)	2–1	Brockenhurst (9)	187
139	Moneyfields (8)	3–1	Andover New Street (9)	70
140	Hamworthy United (9)	1–0	AFC Totton (8)	109
141	Lymington Town (9)	2–0	Frimley Green (10)	68
142	Fleet Town (8)	3–1	Petersfield Town (10)	141
144	AFC Stoneham (10)	2–0	Westfield (Surrey) (8)	178
145	Baffins Milton Rovers (9)	1–4	Hartley Wintney (7)	181
146	Wimborne Town (7)	6–0	Newport (IoW) (10)	214
147	Melksham Town (8)	1–0	Blackfield & Langley (8)	210
148	Ascot United (9)	0–3	Horndean (9)	158
149	Winchester City (8)	1–0	Bournemouth (9)	133
150	Bodmin Town (10)	2–2	Cadbury Heath (9)	120
151	Bideford (8)	2–2	Bristol Manor Farm (8)	214
152	Bradford Town (9)	0–1	Paulton Rovers (8)	192
153	Hallen (9)	0–5	Bridport (9)	43
154	Barnstaple Town (8)	0–1	Shaftesbury (9)	110
155	Plymouth Parkway (9)	1–0	Larkhall Athletic (8)	177
156	Portland United (9)	0–2	Bitton (9)	157
157	Westbury United (9)	3–0	Saltash United (10)	55
158	Cheddar (10)	0–3	Yate Town (8)	238
159	Willand Rovers (9)	1–2	Street (8)	187
160	Buckland Athletic (9)	2–0	Mangotsfield United (8)	137
Sunday 26 August 2018
46	Worksop Town (9)	2–1	Carlton Town (8)	435
71	Stansted (9)	0–1	Takeley (9)	207
87	Romford (8)	3–2	Baldock Town (9)	98
116	Cray Valley Paper Mills (9)	4–1	Ashford Town (8)	87
Monday 27 August 2018
97	Brackley Town Saints (9)	0–0	Hadley (9)	111
Tuesday 4 September 2018
28	Charnock Richard (9)	2–2	Leek Town (8)	232
57	Biggleswade (9)	3–5	Soham Town Rangers (8)	138
Replays
Tuesday 28 August 2018
61R	Eynesbury Rovers (9)	1–3	Histon (9)	232
110R	Epsom & Ewell (10)	0–3 (a.e.t.)	Beckenham Town (9)	95
Wednesday 29 August 2018
12R	Guisborough Town (9)	4–0	Albion Sports (9)	213
86R	Sporting Bengal United (9)	1–3	Brentwood Town (8)	158
97R	Hadley (9)	1–0	Brackley Town Saints (9)	70
150R	Cadbury Heath (9)	4–1	Bodmin Town (10)	120
Monday 3 September 2018
125R	Erith Town (9)	4–1	Loxwood (9)	74
Tuesday 4 September 2018
9R	Sunderland RCA (9)	2–3	Clitheroe (8)	248
10R	Selby Town (10)	1–1 (3–5 p)	Kendal Town (8)	377
14R	Mossley (8)	1–1 (4–2 p)	Ossett United (8)	246
17R	Ramsbottom United (8)	0–0 (2–3 p)	Kidsgrove Athletic (8)	168
22R	Squires Gate (9)	1–0	Droylsden (8)	157
30R	Glossop North End (8)	2–3 (a.e.t.)	City of Liverpool (9)	348
39R	Chasetown (8)	3–1	Wednesfield (10)	231
41R	Market Drayton Town (8)	0–1	Haughmond (10)	149
47R	Cleethorpes Town (8)	1–0	Loughborough University (9)	231
52R	Peterborough Sports (8)	4–3	Stamford (8)	351
53R	Wisbech Town (8)	0–0 (5–3 p)	Northampton Sileby Rangers (10)	209
54R	AFC Rushden & Diamonds (7)	3–0	Deeping Rangers (9)	396
56R	Dunstable Town (8)	0–4	Corby Town (8)	146
74R	Witham Town (8)	1–3	Coggeshall Town (8)	379
91R	Swindon Supermarine (7)	3–0	AFC Dunstable (8)	132
96R	Aylesbury (8)	0–1	Didcot Town (8)	116
98R	Wantage Town (9)	1–0	Slimbridge (8)	133
106R	Lydney Town (9)	5–3	Royal Wootton Bassett Town (9)	167
118R	Hanworth Villa (9)	0–1	AFC Croydon Athletic (9)	74
119R	Spelthorne Sports (9)	4–3 (a.e.t.)	Raynes Park Vale (9)	107
127R	Saltdean United (9)	1–2	Whyteleafe (8)	109
136R	Bemerton Heath Harlequins (9)	3–2	Thatcham Town (8)	154
151R	Bristol Manor Farm (8)	4–2 (a.e.t.)	Bideford (8)	167
Wednesday 5 September 2018
117R	Lewes (7)	8–1	Molesey (8)	350
131R	Rusthall (9)	2–2 (3–4 p)	Cray Wanderers (8)	274
Saturday 8 September 2018
28R	Leek Town (8)	3–2	Charnock Richard (9)	243

== First qualifying round ==
The first qualifying round fixtures were to be played on Friday 7, Saturday 8 and Sunday 9 September 2018; replays no later than Thursday 13 September 2018. The draw was held on 28 August 2018. A total of 232 teams took part in this stage of the competition, including the 160 winners from the Preliminary round and 72 entering at this stage from the four divisions at Level 7 (all except those who were promoted from level 8) of English football. The round included eight teams from Level 10, the lowest-ranked teams still in the competition.

Tie	Home team (Tier)	Score	Away team (Tier)	Att.
Friday 7 September 2018
22	Basford United (7)	1–3	Staveley Miners Welfare (9)	379
Saturday 8 September 2018
1	Radcliffe (8)	1–0	Stalybridge Celtic (7)	388
2	Squires Gate (9)	1–5	City of Liverpool (9)	255
3	Lancaster City (7)	0–2	Trafford (8)	234
4	South Shields (7)	5–1	Garforth Town (9)	1,148
5	Warrington Town (7)	4–0	Burscough (9)	240
6	Runcorn Town (9)	2–3	Irlam (9)	162
7	Whitley Bay (9)	1–0	Whitby Town (7)	680
8	Marine (7)	1–1	Scarborough Athletic (7)	496
9	Colne (8)	2–0	Hyde United (7)	345
10	Newcastle Benfield (9)	1–1	Workington (7)	294
11	Dunston UTS (9)	4–1	North Ferriby United (7)	303
12	Knaresborough Town (9)	7–3	Kendal Town (8)	315
13	Atherton Collieries (8)	1–2	Kidsgrove Athletic (8)	161
14	Guisborough Town (9)	0–4	Farsley Celtic (7)	277
15	Congleton Town (9)	0–1	Consett (9)	276
16	Witton Albion (7)	5–0	Bottesford Town (9)	248
17	Clitheroe (8)	2–5	Mossley (8)	356
18	Ashton Athletic (9)	1–1	Morpeth Town (8)	149
19	Maltby Main (9)	1–2	Frickley Athletic (8)	504
21	Bamber Bridge (7)	3–1	Tadcaster Albion (8)	294
23	Highgate United (9)	1–2	Stourbridge (7)	320
24	Cleethorpes Town (8)	4–1	Walsall Wood (9)	227
26	Romulus (9)	4–0	Belper Town (8)	132
27	Nantwich Town (7)	5–2	Worksop Town (9)	374
28	Sutton Coldfield Town (8)	2–2	Rushall Olympic (7)	249
29	Quorn (9)	0–1	Atherstone Town (10)	295
30	Coalville Town (7)	2–1	Racing Club Warwick (10)	220
31	Hednesford Town (7)	2–0	Tamworth (7)	602
32	Grimsby Borough (10)	1–2	Stafford Rangers (7)	169
33	Matlock Town (7)	1–2	Halesowen Town (7)	403
34	Barwell (7)	2–5	Buxton (7)	172
35	Daventry Town (9)	0–1	Grantham Town (7)	180
36	Mickleover Sports (7)	6–0	Haughmond (10)	170
37	Anstey Nomads (10)	2–1	Oadby Town (9)	418
38	Chasetown (8)	1–1	Gainsborough Trinity (7)	238
39	Redditch United (7)	2–4	Rugby Town (9)	242
40	Stratford Town (7)	0–1	Alvechurch (7)	238
41	Leverstock Green (9)	0–0	Hadley (9)	94
42	St Neots Town (7)	2–1	Bishop's Stortford (7)	209
43	Burnham (10)	1–0	Bury Town (8)	133
44	Cambridge City (8)	3–4	Brightlingsea Regent (7)	187
46	Heybridge Swifts (8)	2–0	Newmarket Town (9)	226
47	Hanwell Town (8)	2–1	Potters Bar Town (7)	142
48	Brantham Athletic (9)	1–0	Spalding United (8)	169
49	Corby Town (8)	2–0	Hertford Town (8)	507
50	AFC Sudbury (8)	3–2	Royston Town (7)	208
51	Ware (8)	0–1	Lowestoft Town (7)	173
52	Hendon (7)	1–1	Harlow Town (7)	264
53	Brentwood Town (8)	2–3	Haringey Borough (7)	199
54	Haverhill Rovers (9)	0–0	Long Melford (9)	206
55	AFC Hornchurch (7)	1–0	Harrow Borough (7)	324
56	Swindon Supermarine (7)	7–1	Woodbridge Town (9)	204
57	FC Romania (8)	4–0	Soham Town Rangers (8)	62
58	Chesham United (7)	2–1	Biggleswade Town (7)	201
59	Chalfont St Peter (8)	1–1	Kempston Rovers (8)	106
60	Great Wakering Rovers (8)	3–1	Wisbech Town (8)	112
62	King's Lynn Town (7)	2–2	Histon (9)	491
63	Hayes & Yeading United (8)	2–1	AFC Rushden & Diamonds (7)	286
64	Northwood (8)	0–0	Kings Langley (7)	229
65	Coggeshall Town (8)	1–1	Berkhamsted (8)	208
66	Saffron Walden Town (9)	0–0	St Ives Town (7)	521
67	Walthamstow (9)	0–2	Beaconsfield Town (7)	114
68	Wingate & Finchley (7)	1–2	Didcot Town (8)	118
69	Cheshunt (8)	2–2	Leiston (7)	164
70	Hitchin Town (7)	3–1	Godmanchester Rovers (9)	256
71	Bowers & Pitsea (8)	5–1	Takeley (9)	105
72	Basildon United (8)	0–2	Peterborough Sports (8)	198
73	Barton Rovers (8)	0–4	Needham Market (7)	154
74	Enfield Town (7)	0–3	Bedford Town (8)	390
75	Ramsgate (8)	1–1	Sevenoaks Town (8)	242
76	Hastings United (8)	2–1	Kingstonian (7)	602
77	Metropolitan Police (7)	3–2	Cray Wanderers (8)	96
78	Faversham Town (8)	1–3	Worthing (7)	264
79	Farnborough (7)	2–2	Lewes (7)	263
80	AFC Uckfield Town (9)	1–0	AFC Croydon Athletic (9)	183
81	Fleet Town (8)	1–2	East Grinstead Town (8)	159
82	Phoenix Sports (8)	2–2	Lancing (9)	153

Tie	Home team (Tier)	Score	Away team (Tier)	Att.
83	Merstham (7)	0–0	Cray Valley Paper Mills (9)	125
84	Spelthorne Sports (9)	1–5	Erith Town (9)	123
85	Hythe Town (8)	0–2	Tonbridge Angels (7)	502
86	Egham Town (8)	1–0	Staines Town (7)	384
87	Corinthian-Casuals (7)	0–0	Whyteleafe (8)	260
88	Margate (7)	3–2	Horndean (9)	273
89	Moneyfields (8)	1–0	Thamesmead Town (8)	75
90	Whitstable Town (8)	0–5	Bognor Regis Town (7)	297
91	Horsham YMCA (9)	1–2	Tooting & Mitcham United (8)	171
92	Corinthian (9)	1–1	Horsham (8)	118
93	Pagham (9)	0–2	Whitehawk (7)	212
94	Leatherhead (7)	2–0	Herne Bay (8)	227
95	Beckenham Town (9)	0–0	Walton Casuals (7)	95
96	Burgess Hill Town (7)	1–0	Folkestone Invicta (7)	337
97	Dorking Wanderers (7)	2–0	Hartley Wintney (7)	331
98	Sittingbourne (8)	0–1	Gosport Borough (7)	154
99	Weymouth (7)	1–1	Banbury United (7)	751
100	Melksham Town (8)	1–4	Merthyr Town (7)	304
101	Bitton (9)	3–0	Westbury United (9)	116
102	AFC Stoneham (10)	0–7	Cirencester Town (8)	225
103	Salisbury (7)	1–1	Yate Town (8)	548
104	Cadbury Heath (9)	0–1	Cinderford Town (8)	121
105	Binfield (9)	3–0	Buckland Athletic (9)	248
106	Frome Town (7)	1–1	Winchester City (8)	165
107	Wimborne Town (7)	1–1	Dorchester Town (7)	523
108	Shaftesbury (9)	0–1	Poole Town (7)	439
109	Sholing (9)	0–0	Hamworthy United (9)	230
110	Plymouth Parkway (9)	0–0	Street (8)	203
111	Taunton Town (7)	7–1	Bemerton Heath Harlequins (9)	517
112	Paulton Rovers (8)	1–1	Basingstoke Town (7)	282
113	Bridport (9)	0–1	Tiverton Town (7)	268
114	Bishop's Cleeve (9)	0–2	Wantage Town (9)	147
115	Chipping Sodbury Town (9)	0–2	Bristol Manor Farm (8)	133
116	Lymington Town (9)	2–2	Lydney Town (9)	97
Sunday 9 September 2018
25	AFC Mansfield (8)	2–1	Stourport Swifts (9)	213
45	Aylesbury United (8)	0–0	Marlow (8)	171
61	Romford (8)	1–4	Kettering Town (7)	271
Wednesday 12 September 2018
20	Parkgate (10)	2–2	Leek Town (8)	190
Replays
Monday 10 September 2018
28R	Rushall Olympic (7)	0–1	Sutton Coldfield Town (8)	236
Tuesday 11 September 2018
8R	Scarborough Athletic (7)	2–3	Marine (7)	975
10R	Workington (7)	5–3	Newcastle Benfield (9)	372
18R	Morpeth Town (8)	1–2	Ashton Athletic (9)	307
38R	Gainsborough Trinity (7)	8–2	Chasetown (8)	412
45R	Marlow (8)	2–1 (a.e.t.)	Aylesbury United (8)	170
52R	Harlow Town (7)	1–2 (a.e.t.)	Hendon (7)	173
59R	Kempston Rovers (8)	2–2 (4–1 p)	Chalfont St Peter (8)	108
62R	Histon (9)	0–7	King's Lynn Town (7)	388
64R	Kings Langley (7)	3–1	Northwood (8)	230
65R	Berkhamsted (8)	1–2	Coggeshall Town (8)	156
66R	St Ives Town (7)	3–1	Saffron Walden Town (9)	258
69R	Leiston (7)	4–2	Cheshunt (8)	179
75R	Sevenoaks Town (8)	1–3	Ramsgate (8)	172
82R	Lancing (9)	W.O.	Phoenix Sports (8)	171
Walkover for Lancing as Phoenix Sports fielded an ineligible player in their 0-3 win.
87R	Whyteleafe (8)	W.O.	Corinthian-Casuals (7)	183
Walkover for Corinthian-Casuals as Whyteleafe fielded an ineligible player in their 2-1 win.
95R	Walton Casuals (7)	3–0	Beckenham Town (9)	118
99R	Banbury United (7)	2–1	Weymouth (7)	550
103R	Yate Town (8)	1–3	Salisbury (7)	252
106R	Winchester City (8)	2–1 (a.e.t.)	Frome Town (7)	151
107R	Dorchester Town (7)	3–0	Wimborne Town (7)	476
109R	Hamworthy United (9)	0–1	Sholing (9)	146
110R	Street (8)	1–4	Plymouth Parkway (9)	207
112R	Basingstoke Town (7)	2–0	Paulton Rovers (8)	330
116R	Lydney Town (9)	1–2	Lymington Town (9)	337
Wednesday 12 September 2018
41R	Hadley (9)	0–1	Leverstock Green (9)	116
54R	Long Melford (9)	1–2	Haverhill Rovers (9)	184
79R	Lewes (7)	1–1 (4–1 p)	Farnborough (7)	395
83R	Cray Valley Paper Mills (9)	3–3 (4–1 p)	Merstham (7)	138
92R	Horsham (8)	5–0	Corinthian (9)	124
Tuesday 18 September 2018
20R	Leek Town (8)	3–0	Parkgate (10)	214

== Second qualifying round ==
The second qualifying round fixtures were played on Saturday 22 and Sunday 23 September 2018; the last replay played on Thursday 7 October 2018. The draw was held on 10 September 2018. A total of 160 teams took part in this stage of the competition, including the 116 winners from the first qualifying round and 44 entering at this stage from two divisions at Level 6 of English football. The round included Anstey Nomads, Atherstone Town and Burnham from Level 10, the lowest-ranked teams still in the competition.

Tie	Home team (Tier)	Score	Away team (Tier)	Att.
Saturday 22 September 2018
1	Chester (6)	4–0	City of Liverpool (9)	1,806
2	Ashton United (6)	3–0	Trafford (8)	240
3	Radcliffe (8)	1–2	Curzon Ashton (6)	381
4	Farsley Celtic (7)	0–3	Southport (6)	306
5	Mossley (8)	1–2	Kidsgrove Athletic (8)	439
6	Staveley Miners Welfare (9)	0–4	Guiseley (6)	437
7	South Shields (7)	1–2	Stockport County (6)	1,707
8	Knaresborough Town (9)	1–4	Workington (7)	507
9	Cleethorpes Town (8)	3–3	Bamber Bridge (7)	302
10	York City (6)	5–0	Ashton Athletic (9)	1,020
11	Marine (7)	1–0	Frickley Athletic (8)	401
12	Dunston UTS (9)	2–1	Irlam (9)	365
13	FC United of Manchester (6)	2–0	Colne (8)	1,130
14	Nantwich Town (7)	3–3	Blyth Spartans (6)	371
15	Darlington (6)	0–1	Bradford Park Avenue (6)	1,037
16	Chorley (6)	3–0	Leek Town (8)	746
17	Witton Albion (7)	2–1	Spennymoor Town (6)	322
18	Altrincham (6)	5–0	Whitley Bay (9)	680
19	Consett (9)	3–3	Warrington Town (7)	451
20	Sutton Coldfield Town (8)	2–2	Alfreton Town (6)	284
21	Boston United (6)	0–2	Peterborough Sports (8)	935
22	St Ives Town (7)	1–1	Grantham Town (7)	293
23	Kidderminster Harriers (6)	5–0	Atherstone Town (10)	1,212
24	Stourbridge (7)	3–2	Leamington (6)	467
25	Rugby Town (9)	1–3	Hednesford Town (7)	328
26	St Neots Town (7)	4–3	Romulus (9)	325
27	Nuneaton Borough (6)	1–1	Brackley Town (6)	491
28	Alvechurch (7)	1–4	Corby Town (8)	256
29	Kettering Town (7)	2–1	AFC Mansfield (8)	504
30	Anstey Nomads (10)	1–7	Mickleover Sports (7)	283
31	Halesowen Town (7)	0–3	Gainsborough Trinity (7)	338
32	King's Lynn Town (7)	3–1	Stafford Rangers (7)	601
33	AFC Telford United (6)	3–1	Bedford Town (8)	737
34	Buxton (7)	0–0	Coalville Town (7)	322
35	Hampton & Richmond Borough (6)	3–0	Burgess Hill Town (7)	422
36	Kings Langley (7)	1–1	Lewes (7)	288
37	Wealdstone (6)	2–0	Great Wakering Rovers (8)	402
38	Welling United (6)	2–1	Chesham United (7)	435
40	Woking (6)	4–0	Tooting & Mitcham United (8)	1,001
41	Hanwell Town (8)	1–0	Lowestoft Town (7)	155
42	Egham Town (8)	3–3	Brightlingsea Regent (7)	140
43	Chelmsford City (6)	1–2	Worthing (7)	563
44	Concord Rangers (6)	2–0	Margate (7)	219
45	Leverstock Green (9)	2–4	Dorking Wanderers (7)	130
46	Haringey Borough (7)	2–0	Erith Town (9)	187
47	Leiston (7)	3–4	Hastings United (8)	263
48	Coggeshall Town (8)	2–0	Walton Casuals (7)	128
50	Bowers & Pitsea (8)	1–6	Hemel Hempstead Town (6)	215
51	Billericay Town (6)	4–1	Burnham (10)	667
52	Kempston Rovers (8)	1–0	Marlow (8)	145
53	Hitchin Town (7)	1–1	Didcot Town (8)	298
54	Bognor Regis Town (7)	1–1	AFC Sudbury (8)	431
55	Haverhill Rovers (9)	0–6	Leatherhead (7)	401
56	East Thurrock United (6)	2–3	Whitehawk (7)	154
57	Brantham Athletic (9)	0–1	Eastbourne Borough (6)	285

Tie	Home team (Tier)	Score	Away team (Tier)	Att.
58	Oxford City (6)	5–0	Cray Valley Paper Mills (9)	142
59	Gosport Borough (7)	2–3	Ramsgate (8)	157
60	AFC Hornchurch (7)	2–1	East Grinstead Town (8)	227
61	AFC Uckfield Town (9)	1–3	Dartford (6)	500
62	Hayes & Yeading United (8)	0–1	Moneyfields (8)	177
63	FC Romania (8)	0–2	Beaconsfield Town (7)	104
64	Horsham (8)	4–3	Heybridge Swifts (8)	162
65	Dulwich Hamlet (6)	3–1	Tonbridge Angels (7)	569
66	Metropolitan Police (7)	2–2	Needham Market (7)	111
67	Merthyr Town (7)	1–4	Winchester City (8)	291
68	Lymington Town (9)	0–7	Torquay United (6)	639
69	Chippenham Town (6)	2–2	Swindon Supermarine (7)	384
70	Bristol Manor Farm (8)	5–2	Basingstoke Town (7)	217
72	Weston-super-Mare (6)	2–2	Salisbury (7)	315
73	Tiverton Town (7)	2–0	Dorchester Town (7)	307
74	Hereford (6)	0–0	Truro City (6)	1,441
75	Poole Town (7)	3–0	Cinderford Town (8)	298
76	Taunton Town (7)	4–0	Bitton (9)	450
77	Banbury United (7)	0–2	Bath City (6)	654
78	Hungerford Town (6)	A–A	Wantage Town (9)	300
Match abandoned after 73 minutes due to an injury to a Hungerford Town player. The score was 0–0.
79	Binfield (9)	0–3	Cirencester Town (8)	204
80	Slough Town (6)	2–2	Sholing (9)	465
Sunday 23 September 2018
71	Gloucester City (6)	3–1	Plymouth Parkway (9)	349
Tuesday 25 September 2018
78	Hungerford Town (6)	1–1	Wantage Town (9)	166
Tuesday 2 October 2018
39	Hendon (7)	1–1	Lancing (9)	177
49	St Albans City (6)	1–1	Corinthian-Casuals (7)	403
Replays
Tuesday 25 September 2018
9R	Bamber Bridge (7)	0–5	Cleethorpes Town (8)	315
14R	Blyth Spartans (6)	1–0	Nantwich Town (7)	491
19R	Warrington Town (7)	2–0	Consett (9)	312
20R	Alfreton Town (6)	3–0	Sutton Coldfield Town (8)	194
22R	Grantham Town (7)	0–2	St Ives Town (7)	294
27R	Brackley Town (6)	2–0	Nuneaton Borough (6)	325
34R	Coalville Town (7)	4–1	Buxton (7)	198
42R	Brightlingsea Regent (7)	2–1	Egham Town (8)	190
53R	Didcot Town (8)	0–0 (2–3 p)	Hitchin Town (7)	151
54R	AFC Sudbury (8)	3–2 (a.e.t.)	Bognor Regis Town (7)	210
66R	Needham Market (7)	2–3 (a.e.t.)	Metropolitan Police (7)	208
69R	Swindon Supermarine (7)	0–1	Chippenham Town (6)	364
72R	Salisbury (7)	2–3 (a.e.t.)	Weston-super-Mare (6)	551
80R	Sholing (9)	0–3 (a.e.t.)	Slough Town (6)	327
Wednesday 26 September 2018
36R	Lewes (7)	2–1	Kings Langley (7)	342
74R	Truro City (6)	3–4 (a.e.t.)	Hereford (6)	250
Tuesday 2 October 2018
78R	Wantage Town (9)	2–2 (1–4 p)	Hungerford Town (6)	330
Saturday 6 October 2018
49R	Corinthian-Casuals (7)	0–3	St Albans City (6)	112
Sunday 7 October 2018
39R	Lancing (9)	0–4	Hendon (7)	307

== Third qualifying round ==
The third qualifying round fixtures were to be played on Saturday 6 October 2018 with all replays completed by Thursday 11 October 2018. The draw took place on 24 September 2018. The 80 winning teams from the second qualifying round took part in this stage of the competition and no additional teams entered at this stage. The round included Dunston UTS, from Level 9 of the football pyramid as the lowest-ranked team still in the competition.

Tie	Home team (Tier)	Score	Away team (Tier)	Att.
Saturday 6 October 2018
1	Workington (7)	0–0	Kidsgrove Athletic (8)	558
2	Stockport County (6)	3–0	Corby Town (8)	1,935
3	Mickleover Sports (7)	1–2	Alfreton Town (6)	505
4	Kettering Town (7)	4–0	Hednesford Town (7)	502
5	Brackley Town (6)	2–3	Marine (7)	371
6	Peterborough Sports (8)	0–3	Chorley (6)	404
7	Altrincham (6)	4–2	Bradford Park Avenue (6)	780
8	Dunston UTS (9)	4–3	Chester (6)	873
9	Stourbridge (7)	3–2	Kidderminster Harriers (6)	1,527
10	FC United of Manchester (6)	1–2	Witton Albion (7)	1,234
11	Cleethorpes Town (8)	2–2	Guiseley (6)	255
12	St Neots Town (7)	2–2	Coalville Town (7)	518
13	King's Lynn Town (7)	0–1	Ashton United (6)	622
14	Curzon Ashton (6)	1–2	Southport (6)	408
15	Gainsborough Trinity (7)	1–2	Blyth Spartans (6)	428
16	York City (6)	3–0	St Ives Town (7)	1,243
17	Warrington Town (7)	2–1	AFC Telford United (6)	543
18	Tiverton Town (7)	3–3	Metropolitan Police (7)	338
19	Haringey Borough (7)	2–1	AFC Sudbury (8)	209
20	Gloucester City (6)	3–3	Dorking Wanderers (7)	333
21	Leatherhead (7)	1–1	Hanwell Town (8)	279
22	Eastbourne Borough (6)	4–3	Dulwich Hamlet (6)	570
23	Woking (6)	3–2	Kempston Rovers (8)	944
25	Billericay Town (6)	9–1	Whitehawk (7)	609
26	Hereford (6)	0–2	Welling United (6)	1,330
27	Hitchin Town (7)	2–0	Hastings United (8)	425

Tie	Home team (Tier)	Score	Away team (Tier)	Att.
28	Concord Rangers (6)	2–1	Beaconsfield Town (7)	184
29	Hemel Hempstead Town (6)	5–0	Ramsgate (8)	307
30	Moneyfields (8)	2–3	Worthing (7)	256
31	Bath City (6)	3–0	Lewes (7)	628
32	Slough Town (6)	2–2	Bristol Manor Farm (8)	481
33	Hungerford Town (6)	1–2	Wealdstone (6)	306
34	Hampton & Richmond Borough (6)	1–0	AFC Hornchurch (7)	316
36	Brightlingsea Regent (7)	0–3	Torquay United (6)	470
37	Weston-super-Mare (6)	1–0	Coggeshall Town (8)	288
38	Horsham (8)	1–1	Poole Town (7)	355
39	Oxford City (6)	4–1	Dartford (6)	312
40	Winchester City (8)	3–0	Cirencester Town (8)	302
Wednesday 10 October 2018
24	Taunton Town (7)	5–2	St Albans City (6)	595
35	Chippenham Town (6)	4–1	Hendon (7)	402
Replays
Tuesday 9 October 2018
11R	Guiseley (6)	2–1	Cleethorpes Town (8)	384
12R	Coalville Town (7)	3–3 (3–5 p)	St Neots Town (7)	409
18R	Metropolitan Police (7)	1–0 (a.e.t.)	Tiverton Town (7)	172
20R	Dorking Wanderers (7)	0–3	Gloucester City (6)	563
21R	Hanwell Town (8)	0–0 (2–4 p)	Leatherhead (7)	366
32R	Bristol Manor Farm (8)	0–4	Slough Town (6)	541
38R	Poole Town (7)	2–1 (a.e.t.)	Horsham (8)	381
Wednesday 10 October 2018
1R	Kidsgrove Athletic (8)	2–1 (a.e.t.)	Workington (7)	423

== Fourth qualifying round ==
The fourth qualifying round fixtures were played on Saturday 20 October 2018 with all replays completed by Thursday 25 October 2018. The draw took place on 8 October 2018. A total of 64 teams took part in this stage of the competition: the 40 winners from the third qualifying round and the 24 members of the National League who entered at this stage, representing Level 5 of English football. The round included Dunston UTS from Level 9 of the football pyramid, the lowest-ranked team still in the competition.

Tie	Home team (Tier)	Score	Away team (Tier)	Att.
Saturday 20 October 2018
1	Guiseley (6)	3–1	Stourbridge (7)	633
2	Warrington Town (7)	2–2	FC Halifax Town (5)	929
3	Chorley (6)	3–2	Barrow (5)	1,734
4	Hartlepool United (5)	1–0	Kidsgrove Athletic (8)	2,703
5	AFC Fylde (5)	1–3	Chesterfield (5)	1,092
6	Southport (6)	2–1	Ashton United (6)	770
7	Blyth Spartans (6)	0–1	York City (6)	1,378
8	Harrogate Town (5)	0–0	Wrexham (5)	1,540
9	Dunston UTS (9)	0–4	Gateshead (5)	2,520
10	Stockport County (6)	2–0	Altrincham (6)	2,981
11	Marine (7)	1–2	Salford City (5)	1,709
12	Witton Albion (7)	0–2	Solihull Moors (5)	683
13	Alfreton Town (6)	4–0	St Neots Town (7)	645
14	Woking (6)	1–0	Welling United (6)	1,281
15	Hitchin Town (7)	1–1	Leatherhead (7)	1,278
16	Chippenham Town (6)	1–1	Maidenhead United (5)	706
17	Eastbourne Borough (6)	1–2	Slough Town (6)	802
18	Hemel Hempstead Town (6)	1–1	Oxford City (6)	762
19	Weston-super-Mare (6)	1–0	Bath City (6)	1,053
20	Boreham Wood (5)	2–2	Dagenham & Redbridge (5)	408
21	Metropolitan Police (7)	1–0	Havant & Waterlooville (5)	335

Tie	Home team (Tier)	Score	Away team (Tier)	Att.
22	Gloucester City (6)	0–1	Bromley (5)	621
23	Aldershot Town (5)	2–0	Kettering Town (7)	1,634
24	Torquay United (6)	4–1	Winchester City (8)	2,202
25	Billericay Town (6)	2–2	Taunton Town (7)	976
26	Eastleigh (5)	0–1	Hampton & Richmond Borough (6)	740
27	Wealdstone (6)	1–2	Sutton United (5)	1,082
28	Ebbsfleet United (5)	4–0	Worthing (7)	1,011
29	Maidstone United (5)	2–0	Leyton Orient (5)	1,906
30	Haringey Borough (7)	2–1	Poole Town (7)	402
31	Barnet (5)	4–2	Braintree Town (5)	1,057
32	Concord Rangers (6)	0–1	Dover Athletic (5)	446
Replays
Tuesday 23 October 2018
2R	FC Halifax Town (5)	2–0	Warrington Town (7)	844
8R	Wrexham (5)	2–0	Harrogate Town (5)	2,515
16R	Maidenhead United (5)	1–0	Chippenham Town (6)	738
18R	Oxford City (6)	5–0	Hemel Hempstead Town (6)	405
20R	Dagenham & Redbridge (5)	0–1	Boreham Wood (5)	792
Wednesday 24 October 2018
15R	Leatherhead (7)	1–2 (a.e.t.)	Hitchin Town (7)	637
25R	Taunton Town (7)	0–1	Billericay Town (6)	1,582

== Competition proper ==
32 winners from the fourth qualifying round advance to the First round proper, where 48 teams from League One (Level 3) and League Two (Level 4) of English football, operating in the English Football League, enter the competition.

== Broadcasting rights ==
The qualifying rounds aren't covered by the FA Cup's broadcasting contracts held by BBC Sport and BT Sport, although one game per round will be broadcast by the BBC on its media platforms.

The following qualifying rounds matches were broadcast live in the UK:

Round	Tie	Broadcaster
Extra preliminary round	Haverhill Rovers (9) vs Haverhill Borough (10)	BBC Sport
Preliminary round	Prestwich Heys (10) vs Radcliffe (8)	BBC Sport
First qualifying round	Maltby Main (9) vs Frickley Athletic (8)	BBC Sport
Second qualifying round	Lymington Town (9) vs Torquay United (6)	BBC Sport
Third qualifying round	Peterborough Sports (8) vs Chorley (6)	BBC Sport
Fourth qualifying round	Dunston UTS (9) vs Gateshead (5)	BBC Sport
