= 2012 FA Vase final =

- Event: 2011–12 FA Vase
Dunston UTS	West Auckland Town
2	0
- Date: 13 May 2012
- Venue: Wembley Stadium, London
- Referee: Roger East (Wiltshire FA)
- Attendance: 5,126

The 2011–12 FA Vase final was the 38th final of The Football Association's cup competition for teams at levels 9–11 of the English football league system. The match was contested between Dunston UTS, of the Northern League Division 1 (level 9), and West Auckland Town, of the Northern League Division 1 (level 9).

== Match ==
=== Details ===
13 May 2012
15:00

Dunston UTS	2–0	West Auckland Town
Andrew Bulford 32', 79'	report

Wembley Stadium, London
Attendance: 5,126
Referee: Roger East (Wiltshire FA)

ath1314s

GK	1	Liam Connell
DF	2	Ben Cattanach (c)
DF	3	Terry Galbraith
DF	4	Michael Robson
DF	5	Chris Swailes
MF	6	Kane Young
MF	7	Steven Shaw
MF	8	Michael Dixon
FW	9	Stephen Goddard	(substituted off) 85'
FW	10	Andrew Bulford	(substituted off) 89'
MF	11	Lee McAndrew
Substitutes:
	12	Ian Herron
	13	Andrew Clark
	14	Danny Craggs	(substituted on) 89'
	15	Jack Burns
	16	Steven Preen	(substituted on) 85'
Manager:
Billy Irwin

GK	1	Mark Bell
DF	2	Neil Pattinson
DF	3	Andrew Green
DF	4	Jonny Gibson
DF	5	John Parker
MF	6	Mark Stephenson	(substituted off) 77'
MF	7	Stuart Banks
MF	8	Mark Hudson
FW	9	Mattie Moffat (c)
FW	10	Michael Rae
MF	11	Adam Nicholls	(substituted off) 60'
Substitutes:
	12	Daniel Hindmarsh	(substituted on) 77'
	18	Daryl Hall
	19	Martin Young	(substituted on) 60'
	23	Ross Preston
	25	Matthew Coad
Manager:
Peter Dixon

Match rules

- 90 minutes.
- 30 minutes of extra-time if necessary.
- Penalty shoot-out if scores still level.
- Five named substitutes.
- Maximum of three substitutions.
