= 2014 FA Vase final =

- Event: 2013-14 FA Vase
Sholing	West Auckland Town
1	0
- Date: 10 May 2014
- Venue: Wembley Stadium, London

The 2013–14 FA Vase final was the 40th final of the Football Association's cup competition for teams at levels 9-11 of the English football league system. The match was contested between Sholing, of the Wessex League Premier Division (level 9), and West Auckland Town, of the Northern League Division 1 (level 9).

== Match ==
=== Details ===
10 May 2014
1500

Sholing	1 – 0	West Auckland Town
Marvin McLean 71'	Report

Wembley Stadium, London
Attendance: 5,431
Referee: David Coote (West Riding FA)

GK	1	Matt Brown
DF	2	Mike Carter
DF	3	Marc Diaper
DF	4	Pete Castle		(substituted off) 53'
DF	5	Lee Bright	(yellow card) 69'
MF	6	Tyrone Bowers		(substituted off) 76'
MF	7	Barry Mason
MF	8	Lewis Fennemore	(yellow card) 67'	(substituted off) 77'
FW	9	Lee Wort
FW	10	Byron Mason (c)
MF	11	Marvin McLean
Substitutes:
	12	Ashley Jarvis
	14	Kevin Brewster		(substituted on) 76'
	15	Dan Miller	(yellow card) 78'	(substituted on) 53'
	16	Alex Sawyer	(yellow card) 82'	(substituted on) 77'
	17	Nick Watts
Manager:
Dave Diaper

GK	1	Jordan Nixon
DF	2	Neil Pattinson
DF	3	Andrew Green (c)	(yellow card) 27'	(substituted off) 63'
DF	4	Daryll Hall
DF	5	Lewis Galpin
MF	6	Brian Close
MF	7	Shaun Vipond		(substituted off) 78'
MF	8	Robert Briggs
FW	9	Mattie Moffat		(substituted off) 74'
FW	10	John Campbell
MF	11	Dennis Knight
Substitutes:
	12	Stuart Banks		(substituted on) 78'
	14	Paul Garthwaite
	15	Jonathan Gibson		(substituted on) 63'
	16	Adam Wilkinson
	17	Steven Richardson		(substituted on) 74'
Manager:
Peter Dixon

Man of the match

- Matt Brown (Sholing)

Match officials

- Assistant referees:
  - Constantine Hatzidakis (Kent FA)
  - Adam Nunn (Wiltshire FA)
- Fourth official: Paul Tierney (Lancashire FA)

Match rules

- 90 minutes.
- 30 minutes of extra-time if necessary.
- Penalty shoot-out if scores still level.
- Five named substitutes.
- Maximum of three substitutions.
