= 1958–59 Northern Football League =

The 1958–59 Northern Football League season was the 61st in the history of the Northern Football League, a football competition in Northern England.

== Clubs ==
Northern League
- Season: 1958–59
- Champions: Crook Town
- Matches: 210
- Goals: 948 (4.51 per match)

The league featured 14 clubs which competed in the last season, along with one new club, joined from the North Eastern League:

- Whitley Bay

=== League table ===
Pos	Team	Pld	W	D	L	GF	GA	GR	Pts
1	Crook Town	28	19	4	5	89	51	1.745	42
2	West Auckland Town	28	16	4	8	80	51	1.569	36
3	Willington	28	15	6	7	65	48	1.354	36
4	Durham City	28	14	5	9	63	52	1.212	33
5	Bishop Auckland	28	13	5	10	76	56	1.357	31
6	Whitby Town	28	13	5	10	70	61	1.148	31
7	Stanley United	28	12	4	12	57	68	0.838	28
8	Evenwood Town	28	13	1	14	54	59	0.915	27
9	Ferryhill Athletic	28	10	5	13	60	72	0.833	25
10	Billingham Synthonia	28	9	6	13	66	70	0.943	24
11	Tow Law Town	28	10	4	14	58	70	0.829	24
12	South Bank	28	7	9	12	48	64	0.750	23
13	Shildon	28	9	4	15	67	83	0.807	22
14	Whitley Bay	28	8	5	15	52	64	0.813	21
15	Penrith	28	7	3	18	43	79	0.544	17

Rules for classification: 1) points; 2) goal ratio.
