= 1964–65 Northern Football League =

The 1964–65 Northern Football League season was the 68th in the history of Northern Football League, a football competition in England.

== Clubs ==
Northern Football League
- Season: 1964–65
- Champions: Whitley Bay
- Matches: 306
- Goals: 1,221 (3.99 per match)

Division One featured 16 clubs which competed in the league last season, along with two new clubs, joined from the North Eastern League:

- Blyth Spartans
- North Shields

=== League table ===
Pos	Team	Pld	W	D	L	GF	GA	GR	Pts
1	Whitley Bay	34	24	5	5	112	45	2.489	53
2	Crook Town	34	22	8	4	86	32	2.688	52
3	North Shields	34	18	8	8	99	60	1.650	44
4	Whitby Town	34	19	4	11	74	52	1.423	42
5	Tow Law Town	34	15	10	9	72	53	1.358	40
6	Willington	34	18	4	12	72	61	1.180	40
7	Spennymoor United	34	16	7	11	53	53	1.000	39
8	Ferryhill Athletic	34	15	7	12	79	62	1.274	37
9	Stanley United	34	16	3	15	86	84	1.024	35
10	West Auckland Town	34	14	6	14	66	54	1.222	34
11	Billingham Synthonia	34	13	6	15	51	79	0.646	32
12	Penrith	34	10	10	14	57	64	0.891	30
13	Bishop Auckland	34	11	6	17	58	73	0.795	28
14	Durham City	34	10	6	18	49	78	0.628	26
15	South Bank	34	9	6	19	67	97	0.691	24
16	Evenwood Town	34	9	5	20	51	80	0.638	23
17	Shildon	34	8	7	19	51	89	0.573	23
18	Blyth Spartans	34	4	2	28	38	105	0.362	10

Source: fchd
Rules for classification: 1) points; 2) goal difference; 3) number of goals scored.
