= 1965–66 Northern Football League =

The 1965–66 Northern Football League season was the 69th in the history of Northern Football League, a football competition in England.

== Clubs ==
Northern Football League
- Season: 1965–66
- Champions: Whitley Bay
- Matches: 306
- Goals: 1,249 (4.08 per match)

Division One featured 18 clubs which competed in the league last season, no new clubs joined the league this season.

=== League table ===
Pos	Team	Pld	W	D	L	GF	GA	GR	Pts
1	Whitley Bay	34	25	2	7	89	46	1.935	52
2	North Shields	34	22	5	7	109	51	2.137	49
3	Bishop Auckland	34	20	8	6	75	33	2.273	48
4	Spennymoor United	34	15	10	9	70	62	1.129	40
5	Tow Law Town	34	14	11	9	66	39	1.692	39
6	Evenwood Town	34	17	5	12	79	56	1.411	37 (Note: Evenwood Town were deducted two points.)
7	Whitby Town	34	15	6	13	63	57	1.105	36
8	Crook Town	34	14	7	13	82	66	1.242	35
9	Billingham Synthonia	34	14	7	13	59	51	1.157	35
10	Blyth Spartans	34	13	7	14	87	81	1.074	33
11	Ferryhill Athletic	34	13	7	14	57	88	0.648	33
12	Willington	34	12	7	15	64	79	0.810	31
13	Penrith	34	12	5	17	54	62	0.871	29
14	Stanley United	34	13	3	18	78	90	0.867	29
15	West Auckland Town	34	9	9	16	47	66	0.712	27
16	Shildon	34	8	6	20	66	112	0.589	22
17	South Bank	34	8	4	22	56	106	0.528	20
18	Durham City	34	5	5	24	48	104	0.462	15

Source: fchd
Rules for classification: 1) points; 2) goal difference; 3) number of goals scored.
