= Paul Tierney (referee) =

English football referee

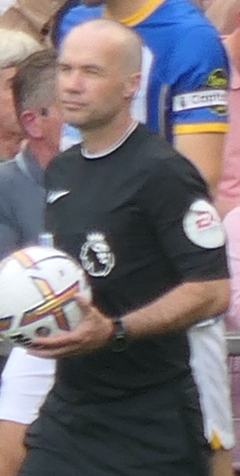
- Tierney in 2022
- Full name: Paul Tierney
- Born: 25 December 1980 (age 45); Wigan, England

Domestic
Years	League	Role
?–2009	National League	Referee
2009–2015	The Football League	Referee
2015–	Premier League	Referee

International
Years	League	Role
2018–	FIFA listed	Referee

Paul Tierney (born 25 December 1980) is a football referee from Wigan, Greater Manchester, who referees in the Premier League. He first officiated in the Premier League on 30 August 2014. He was promoted to the FIFA list of referees in 2018, but was removed again in 2022. Tierney is registered with the Lancashire Football Association.

== Career ==
He was the assistant referee for the 2010 FA Cup Final. At the time of his promotion to the Select Group, Tierney had been on the National List of Referees since 2009 and had refereed more than 230 matches. He was the fourth official for the 2014 FA Vase Final.

Tierney made his third appearance at Wembley on 27 May 2019, when he officiated the Championship play-off final between Aston Villa and Derby County.

On 25 April 2021, Tierney officiated the 2021 EFL Cup final between Manchester City and Tottenham Hotspur.

He officiated the 2023 FA Cup final between Manchester City and Manchester United on 3 June 2023.

== See also ==
- List of football referees
