= 2010 FA Vase final =

- Event: 2009–10 FA Vase
Whitley Bay	Wroxham
6	1
- Date: 9 May 2010
- Venue: Wembley Stadium, London
- Attendance: 8,920

The 2009–10 FA Vase final was the 36th final of the Football Association's cup competition for teams at levels 9–11 of the English football league system. The match was contested between Whitley Bay, of the Northern League Division 1 (level 9), and Wroxham, of the Eastern Counties League (level 9).

Whitley Bay beat Wroxham 6–1.

== Match ==
=== Details ===
9 May 2010
15:00

Whitley Bay	6–1	Wroxham
Paul Chow 1'; Andy Eastaugh 16'; Lee Kerr 46'; Adam Johnston 59'; Paul Robinson 88'; Josh Gillies 90'	Report	Paul Cook 12'

Wembley Stadium, London
Attendance: 8,920
Referee: Anthony Taylor (Manchester FA)

GK	1	Burke
DF	2	Timmons
DF	3	Ryan
DF	4	McFarlane
DF	5	Anderson
MF	6	Hodgson	(substituted off) 68'
MF	7	Robson
MF	8	Robinson
FW	9	Kerr
FW	10	Chow	(substituted off) 60'
MF	11	Johnston	(substituted off) 76'
Substitutes:
	12	Picton	(substituted on) 68'
	14	Kindley
	15	Bell	(substituted on) 60'
	16	Gillies	(substituted on) 76'
	17	Reid
Manager:
Ian Chandler

GK	1	Howie
DF	2	Pauling	(substituted off) 57'
DF	3	Howes
DF	4	Challen
DF	5	McNeil	(substituted off) 46'
MF	6	Easthaugh	(substituted off) 68'
MF	7	Spriggs
MF	8	Lemmon
FW	9	Cook
FW	10	White
MF	11	Gilmore
Substitutes:
	12	Durrant	(substituted on) 57'
	14	Carus	(substituted on) 46'
	15	Simpson
	16	Paynter	(substituted on) 68'
	17	Self
Manager:
David Batch

Man of the match

- Paul Chow (Whitley Bay)

Match rules

- 90 minutes.
- 30 minutes of extra-time if necessary.
- Penalty shoot-out if scores still level.
- Five named substitutes.
- Maximum of three substitutions.
