= 2011 FA Vase final =

- Event: 2010–11 FA Vase
Coalville Town	Whitley Bay
2	3
- Date: 8 May 2011
- Venue: Wembley Stadium, London
- Attendance: 8,778

The 2010–11 FA Vase final was the 37th final of the Football Association's cup competition for teams at levels 9–11 of the English football league system. The match was contested between Coalville Town, of the Midland Alliance (level 9), and Whitley Bay, of the Northern League Division 1 (level 9).

== Match ==
YouTube highlights: "Coalville Town 2-3 Whitley Bay | FA Vase 2011"

=== Details ===
8 May 2011
15:00

Coalville Town	2–3	Whitley Bay
Moore 58'; Goodby 80'	Report	Chow 28'; Kerr 61'; Chow 86'

Wembley Stadium, London
Attendance: 8,778
Referee: Scott Mathieson (Cheshire FA)

GK	1	Bowles
DF	2	Brown	(yellow card) 83'	(substituted off) 87'
DF	3	Stewart
DF	4	Goodby
DF	5	Costello
MF	6	Miveld
MF	7	Woodward
MF	8	Carney		(substituted off) 90'
FW	9	Robbins		(substituted off) 66'
FW	10	Moore
MF	11	Murdock	(yellow card) 51'
Substitutes:
	12	Gardner		(substituted on) 87'
	14	Williams
	15	Attwood		(substituted on) 90'
	16	Wells		(substituted on) 66'
	17	Dodd
Manager:
Adam Stevens

GK	1	Burke
DF	2	Anderson	(yellow card) 35'
DF	3	Timmons
DF	4	Williams		(substituted off) 68'
DF	5	McFarlane		(substituted off) 89'
MF	6	Robson
MF	7	Robinson
MF	8	Pounder		(substituted off) 68'
FW	9	Ormston
FW	10	Kerr
MF	11	Chow
Substitutes:
	12	Coulson		(substituted on) 68'
	14	Rowe
	15	Gibson		(substituted on) 89'
	16	Smith		(substituted on) 68'
	17	Hayes
Manager:
Ian Chandler

Man of the match

- Terry Burke (Whitley Bay)

Match rules

- 90 minutes.
- 30 minutes of extra-time if necessary.
- Penalty shoot-out if scores still level.
- Five named substitutes.
- Maximum of three substitutions.
