= 2009 FA Vase final =

- Event: 2008–09 FA Vase
Glossop North End	Whitley Bay
0	2
- Date: 10 May 2009
- Venue: Wembley Stadium, London
- Referee: Kevin Friend (Leicestershire FA)
- Attendance: 12,200

The 2008–09 FA Vase final was the 35th final of the Football Association's cup competition for teams at levels 9–11 of the English football league system. The match was contested between Glossop North End, of the North West Counties League Premier Division (level 9), and Whitley Bay, of the Northern League Division 1 (level 9).

== Background ==
With a maximum of 9 rounds needed to reach the Final "the Hillmen" played in every round. They played three away ties and five home matches plus the semi-final round, winning each round without need of a replay and outscored their opponents with 33 goals for and 11 conceded. Their semi final matches against Chalfont St Peter was a fascinating affair. With the first leg drawn 3–3, it was 1–1 at the end of 90 mins. In extra time K Lugsden scored with the last kick of extra 30 mins to draw the match 2–2 sending it into penalties. Glossop won the shootout with Rick Bailey keeping his nerve, slotting home the seventh taken penalty to decide the sudden death kick 6–5. "The Seahorses" on the other hand had a much easier time reaching the final only playing in six of the rounds, receiving a bye into Second Round Proper. They were drawn with two away ties and three home matches, again beating all opponents at a first attempt, and narrowly winning their semi 3–2 on aggregate.
It was not Whitley Bays' first visit to Wembley, their last visit was in 2002 when they won the FA Vase Final. In comparison, this was Glossops' first ever visit to the home of football. As could be expected, the town of Glossop was gripped in a Wembley fever.

== Match ==
=== Details ===
10 May 2009
15:00

Glossop North End	0–2	Whitley Bay
	Report	Kerr 28'; Chow 45'

Wembley Stadium, London
Attendance: 12,200
Referee: Kevin Friend (Leicestershire FA)

GK	1	Cooper
DF	2	Young
DF	3	Kay
DF	4	Lugsden
DF	5	Yates
MF	6	Gorton
MF	7	Bailey
MF	8	Morris
FW	9	Allen
FW	10	Hodges
MF	11	Hamilton
Substitutes:
	12
	13
	14
	15
	16
Manager:
Steve Young

GK	1	Burke
DF	2	Taylor
DF	3	Picton
DF	4	McFarlane
DF	5	Coulson
MF	6	Ryan
MF	7	Moore
MF	8	Robson
FW	9	Kerr
FW	10	Chow
MF	11	Johnston
Substitutes:
	12
	13
	14
	15
	16
Manager:
Ian Chandler

Match rules

- 90 minutes.
- 30 minutes of extra-time if necessary.
- Penalty shoot-out if scores still level.
- Five named substitutes.
- Maximum of three substitutions.
