= 2011–12 FA Vase =

Football Association Vase

Tournament details
- Country: England; Wales

Final positions
- Champions: Dunston UTS (1st title)
- Runners-up: West Auckland Town

The 2011–12 FA Vase was the 38th season of the FA Vase, an annual football competition for teams in the lower reaches of the English football league system.

Dunston UTS won the competition, beating West Auckland Town in the final.

== Semi-finals ==
Leg no	Home team (tier)	Score	Away team (tier)	Att.
1st	Herne Bay (9)	2–2	West Auckland Town (9)	1,810
2nd	West Auckland Town (9)	2–1	Herne Bay (9)	1,840

West Auckland Town won 4–3 on aggregate.

Leg no	Home team (tier)	Score	Away team (tier)	Att.
1st	Dunston UTS (9)	1–0	Staveley Miners Welfare (9)	975
2nd	Staveley Miners Welfare (9)	2–2	Dunston UTS (9)	1,050

Dunston UTS won 3–2 on aggregate.

== Final ==
13 May 2012
15:00

Dunston UTS	2–0	West Auckland Town
Andrew Bulford 32', 79'	report report

Wembley Stadium, London
Attendance: 5,126
Referee: Roger East (Wiltshire FA)
