= 2013–14 FA Vase =

Football Association Vase

Tournament details
- Country: England; Wales

Final positions
- Champions: Sholing (1st title)
- Runners-up: West Auckland Town

The 2013–14 FA Vase was the 40th season of the FA Vase, an annual football competition for teams in the lower reaches of the English football league system.

Sholing won the competition, beating West Auckland Town in the final.

== Semi-finals ==
Leg no	Home team (tier)	Score	Away team (tier)	Att.
1st	West Auckland Town (9)	0–0	St Andrews (10)	1,282
2nd	St Andrews (10)	1–2	West Auckland Town (9)	1,600

West Auckland Town won 2–1 on aggregate.

Leg no	Home team (tier)	Score	Away team (tier)	Att.
1st	Sholing (9)	2–2	Eastbourne United (10)	562
2nd	Eastbourne United (10)	2–4	Sholing (9)	1,426

Sholing won 6–4 on aggregate.

== Final ==
10 May 2014
15:00

Sholing	1–0	West Auckland Town
Marvin McLean 71'	Report

Wembley Stadium, London
Attendance: 5,431
Referee: David Coote (West Riding FA)
