= 2026 FA Vase final =

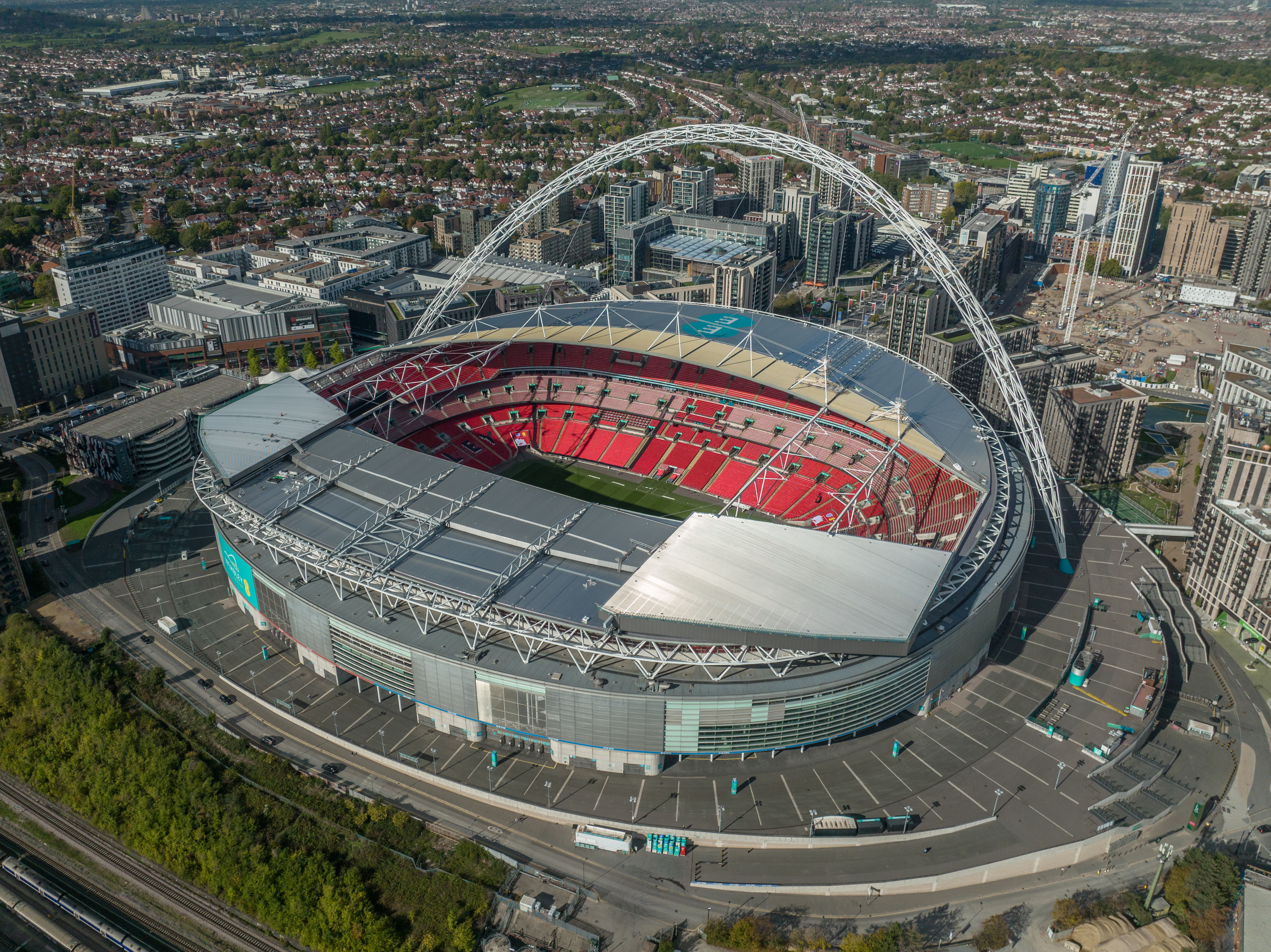
- Wembley Stadium hosted the final
- Event: 2025–26 FA Vase
A.F.C. Stoneham	Cockfosters
0	0
- A.F.C. Stoneham won 4–2 on penalties
- Date: 17 May 2026
- Venue: Wembley Stadium, London
- Referee: Elliott Bell (Liverpool FA)

The 2026 FA Vase final was the 52nd final of the Football Association's cup competition for teams at levels 9–11 of the English football league system. The match was contested between A.F.C. Stoneham and Cockfosters.

As part of Non-League Finals Day, the FA Trophy final was played later the same day at the same venue.

== Route to the final ==
=== AFC Stoneham ===
8 November 2025 Second Round	Kidlington	3–4	AFC Stoneham	Kidlington
15:00 GMT	Allen 20'; Castle 70'; Hawkins 87'		Martins 39', 62'; Sampson 59', 65'	Stadium: Yarnton Road; Attendance: 128

6 December 2025 Third Round	AFC Stoneham	4–0	Cinderford Town	Eastleigh
15:00 GMT	Martins; Bainbridge			Stadium: Stoneham Football Complex; Attendance: 113

17 January 2026 Fourth Round	Barnstaple Town	1–2	AFC Stoneham	Barnstaple
15:00 GMT	Rogers		Thomson; Jenkins	Stadium: Mill Road; Attendance: 356

14 February 2026 Fifth Round	Haywards Heath Town	1–1 (3–4 p)	AFC Stoneham	Haywards Heath
15:00 GMT	Watson 83'		Martins 52'	Stadium: Hanbury Park; Attendance: 684

28 February 2026 Quarter-Final	AFC Stoneham	3–0	Coventry United	Eastleigh
15:00 GMT	Bainbridge; Jenkins			Stadium: Stoneham Football Complex; Attendance: 446

28 March 2026 Semi-Final First Leg	Hallen	0–3	AFC Stoneham	Hallen
15:00 GMT			Sampson 13'; Jenkins 24'; Annetts 37'	Stadium: The Hallen Centre; Attendance: 430

4 April 2026 Semi-Final Second Leg	AFC Stoneham	3–1 (6–1 agg.)	Hallen	Eastleigh
15:00 BST	Welch 26', 43'; Sampson 67'		Iles 79'	Stadium: Stoneham Football Complex; Attendance: 851

=== Cockfosters ===
20 September 2025 Second Qualifying Round	Long Melford	0–4	Cockfosters	Long Melford
15:00 BST				Stadium: Stoneylands; Attendance: 37

18 October 2025 First Round	Cockfosters	1–1 (12–11 p)	Tring Athletic	Cockfosters
15:00 BST				Stadium: Chalk Lane; Attendance: 115

8 November 2025 Second Round	AFC Welwyn	2–2 (3–4 p)	Cockfosters	Hertford
15:00 GMT				Stadium: Hertingfordbury Park; Attendance: 59

6 December 2025 Third Round	Cockfosters	1–1 (3–2 p)	Soul Tower Hamlets	Cockfosters
15:00 GMT	Lutaaya 88'		Kelly 80'	Stadium: Chalk Lane; Attendance: 187

17 January 2026 Fourth Round	Cockfosters	2–1	Crawley Down Gatwick	Cockfosters
15:00 GMT				Stadium: Chalk Lane; Attendance: 202

7 February 2026 Fifth Round	Whitstable Town	1–1 (4–5 p)	Cockfosters	Whitstable
15:00 GMT	Splatt 70'		Gyamfi 51'	Stadium: The Belmont Ground; Attendance: 1,547

28 February 2026 Quarter-Final	Droylsden	2–4	Cockfosters	Droylsden
15:00 GMT	Campbell 26'; Cantello 45+3'		Gyamfi 12' (pen.); Vebonah 37'; Sotoyinbo 82'; Holland 89'	Stadium: Butcher's Arms Ground; Attendance: 1,503

28 March 2026 Semi-Final First Leg	Cockfosters	1–1	Punjab United	Cockfosters
15:00 GMT	Da Cruz 84'		Bushell 13'	Stadium: Chalk Lane; Attendance: 597

4 April 2026 Semi-Final Second Leg	Punjab United	0–2 (1–3 agg.)	Cockfosters	Gravesend
15:00 BST			Lutaaya 12'; Da Cruz 86'	Stadium: Elite Venue; Attendance: 1,209

== Match ==
=== Details ===
17 May 2026
12:30 BST

A.F.C. Stoneham	0–0	Cockfosters
	Report
Penalties
Laycock (penalty scored); Thomson (penalty scored); Annetts (penalty scored); Sampson (penalty scored)	4–2	(penalty scored) Lutaaya; (penalty missed) Hastings; (penalty scored) Jessop; (penalty missed) Moses

Wembley Stadium, London
Referee: Elliott Bell (Liverpool FA)
