= Whitley Bay F.C. =

Association football club in England

Whitley Bay
- Full name: Whitley Bay Football Club
- Nicknames: The Seahorses; The Bay
- Founded: 1897; 129 years ago (as Whitley & Monkseaton F.C.); 1950; 76 years ago (as Whitley Bay Athletic F.C.); 1958; 68 years ago (as Whitley Bay F.C.)
- Ground: Hillheads Park, Whitley Bay
- Capacity: 4,500
- Coordinates: 55°2′5″N 1°27′17″W
- Chairman: Paul McIlduff
- Manager: Jay Bates
- 2025–26: Northern League Division One, 3rd of 19
- Website: whitleybayfc.com
Home colours	Away colours

Whitley Bay Football Club, also known as The Seahorses, or simply The Bay, are an English football club based in the seaside town of Whitley Bay, in the North East county of Tyne and Wear. Initially founded as Whitley & Monkseaton Football Club in 1897, the club took its present name in 1958. The team plays its home matches at Hillheads Park, which is adjacent to the Whitley Bay Ice Rink and has a maximum capacity of 4,500.

Since 1958 the club has spent the vast majority of seasons in the Northern Football League's Division One. The Seahorses first competed in the division for 30 years between 1958 and 1988, before rejoining for the 2000–01 season, where they have been ever since.

Whitley Bay are the most successful club in FA Vase history, the national cup competition for more than 600 teams in the 9th and 10th tier of English football. They have won the competition a record four times, including three consecutive victories at Wembley Stadium in 2009, 2010 and 2011. The club has also won thirteen Northumberland Senior Cups, three Northern Football League championships, and a Northern Premier League Division One title.

== History ==
=== Origins; formation and early years (1896–1958) ===
A football club has existed in Whitley Bay since 1896. The first team was known as Whitley and Monkseaton F.C; later renamed Monkseaton FC and then again to Whitley Bay Athletic in 1950. In 1958 a limited company was formed, with 'Athletic' dropped from the title.

From 1950 until 1955, Whitley Bay Athletic were members of the Northern Alliance League, winning the League Championship, League Cup (twice), and in 1952–53 became the first amateur team to win the Northumberland Senior Cup in sixty years, beating rivals North Shields in front of 17,000 fans inside St James' Park.

In 1955, The Seahorses briefly joined the North Eastern League wholly made up of professional sides,

=== First appearance in the Northern Football League (1958–1988) ===
==== Initial success (1958–1973) ====
Whitley Bay was elected to the Northern League by a winning vote of 11–3 on 14 June 1958. It was here that the club won two league titles (in 1964–65 and 1965–66) and two Northern League Cups (in 1964–65 and 1970–71). In addition, the Northumberland Senior Cup was won eight times in twelve years between 1961–1973.

In the FA Amateur Cup (the predecessor to the FA Vase), The Bay twice reached the semi-finals, and quadrice the quarter-finals; A 1965 quarter-final appearance of which holds the club record attendance (7,301) in a 3–1 loss to Hendon.

On 18 March 1968, floodlights were installed around Hillheads Park; marked by a friendly match against Newcastle United.

==== Decline and then recovery (1973–1988) ====
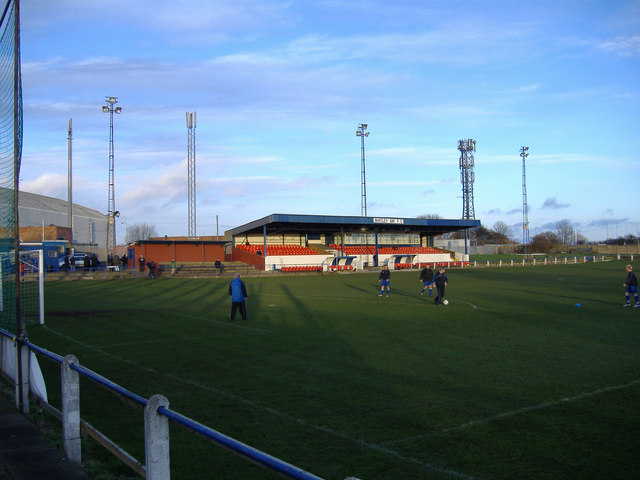
Whitley Bay's home stadium Hillheads Park

Fortunes began to fade from the mid-1970s before having to re-apply to the Northern League as a result of coming last in the 1979–80 campaign. Success remained limited in the aftermath of re-election, with successive finishes of 19th, 19th, 13th, and 9th—during the early 1980s.

Former player, Bobby Graham, was appointed first team manager in 1986. Graham's first season marked Whitley Bay's highest league position in 15 years (5th), their best-ever FA Trophy campaign (reaching the final sixteen) and their first Northumberland Senior Cup since 1973 (beating Newcastle Blue Star, 2–1, in the final at Hillheads Park). The team then sustained a title challenge for the majority of the following season before finishing 4th in midst of numerous injuries.

=== Northern Premier League members (1988–2000) ===
==== Division One (1988–1991) ====
Whitley Bay left the Northern Football League after 30 successive years in the division, applying for promotion to the second tier of the Northern Premier League (NPL) at the end of the 1987–88 season.

In their debut season in the NPL Division One, The Seahorses finished 5th. The team then followed it up with 4th place the season after, in a campaign that also saw them record their best–ever FA Cup run, when they reached the Third Round Proper, beating Scarborough of the fourth tier and Preston North End of the third, before losing 1–0 to Rochdale. In only their third season, Whitley Bay became champions of the Northern Premier League Division One, gaining promotion to the Northern Premier League Premier Division.

==== Premier Division (1991–1995) ====
Whitley Bay only spent four seasons at the club's zenith. 17th in both the first and second season, the highest-ever final league position to date of 11th in the third, before 21st place relegation in the fourth sent the club back to Northern Premier League Division One

==== Division One (1995–2000) ====
Following relegation at the end of the 1994–95 season, Whitley Bay returned to the NPL Division One, finishing 8th in their first season back. The Seahorses then followed it up with 12th in the second season, 13th in the third, and 19th in the fourth. The Bay then finished 22nd and bottom in 1999–2000, being relegated back to the Northern Football League.

=== Return to the Northern Football League (2000–present) ===
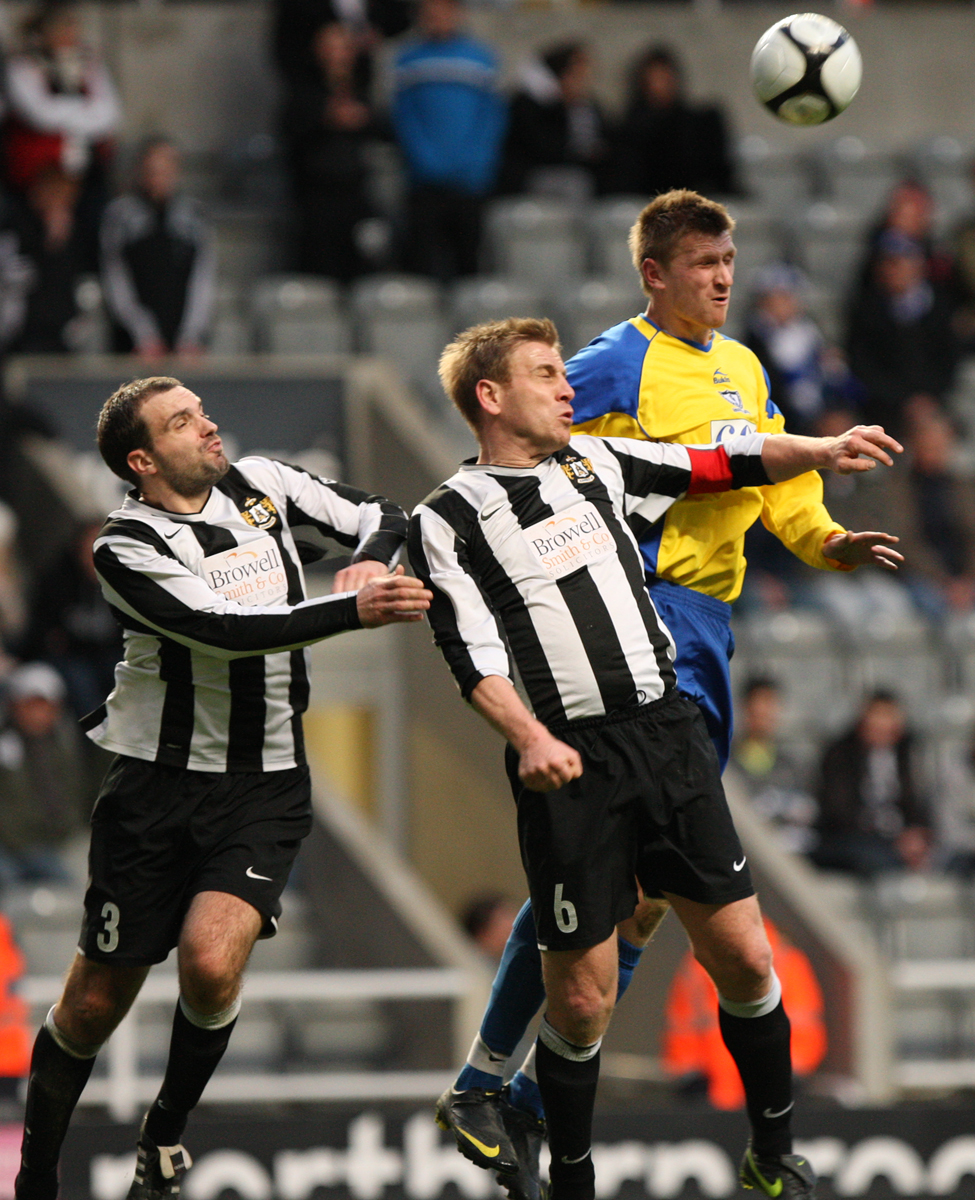
Marc Wamsley (Ashington #3), Iain Nickalls (Ashington #6) and Phil Bell (Whitley Bay) contest a ball at the Northumberland Senior Cup 2010 Final at St James' Park.

Following a second relegation in six seasons in 1999–2000, Whitley Bay returned to Northern Football League Division One after a 12-year absence.

In 2005, Whitley Bay ended an 18-year barren run without a Northumberland Senior Cup title.

The Bay won their third-ever Northern League title in 2006–07, 41 years on from their back–to–back titles in 1964–65 and 1965–66, however they did not apply for promotion.

In 2010, The Seahorses won a twelfth Northumberland Senior Cup.

In 2026, The Seahorses won a thirteenth Northumberland Senior Cup, beating Heaton Stannington 6–5 on penalties at St James' Park.

==== Three appearances at Wembley Stadium and four FA Vase trophies ====
Whitley Bay first won the FA Vase at Villa Park in 2001–02. The Seahorses then maintained a 100% record in finals as they went on to win three consecutive trophies at the new Wembley Stadium in 2008–09, 2009–10 and 2010–11, becoming the competition's most successful club both in the total number of titles and most won consecutively.

== Current squad ==
Note: Flags indicate national team as defined under FIFA eligibility rules; some limited exceptions apply. Players may hold more than one non-FIFA nationality.

No.	Pos.	Nation	Player
—	GK		Mauro Asikaogu
—	GK		Adam Cameron
—	GK		Brogan Colquhoun
—	DF		Jack Errington
—	DF		James Storey
—	DF		George Brady
—	DF		Joe Power
—	DF		Hugo McNicol
—	DF		Jake Forster
—	DF		Michael Scott
—	DF		Josh Stewart
—	MF		Kieren Aplin

No.	Pos.	Nation	Player
—	MF		Liam Heywood
—	MF		Jack Chapman
—	MF		Stephen Hall
—	MF		Jake Jensen
—	MF		Noah Millington
—	MF		Luca Shilling
—	MF		Mikel Thompson
—	FW		Alfie Livermore
—	FW		Scott McCarthy
—	FW		Mackenzie Sharpe
—	FW		Max Storey

== Club officials ==
- Chairman: Paul McIlduff
- Vice Chairman: Peter Siddle
- Football Secretary: Marc Cox
- Treasurer: Mark Burnett
- Joint Commercial Manager: Duncan Howell
- Joint Commercial Manager: David Hall
- Pitch maintenance: David Styles
- Commercial Director: Anna Salkeld
- Media Correspondent: Julian Tyley
- 1st Team Manager: Jay Bates
- 1st Team Assistant Manager: Barry Rizza
- 1st Team Physiotherapist: Jacqueline Stephenson
- 1st Team Coach: Gary Somerville
- 1st Team Kitman: Tommy Davies
- 1st Team Kitman: Jay Weldon
- Matchday Programme Editors: Sam Rathbone and Daniel Mercer

== Finishing positions ==
- League Results:

Key:

== Honours ==
- FA Vase
  - Winners 2001–02, 2008–09, 2009–10, 2010–11
- Northern Premier League
  - Division One Champions 1990–91
  - Division One Cup Winners 1988–89, 1990–91
- Northern League
  - Champions 1964–65, 1965–66, 2006–07
  - Runners-up 1959–60, 1966–67, 1968–69, 1969–70
  - Challenge Cup Winners 1964–65, 1970–71
  - Runners-up 1967–68, 2013–14
- Northumberland Senior Cup
  - Winners 1953, 1961, 1964, 1965, 1968, 1969, 1970, 1971, 1973, 1987, 2005, 2010, 2026
  - Runners-up 1954, 1955, 1956, 1966, 1977, 1986, 1991, 2003, 2013

== Records ==
=== Cup runs ===
- Best FA Cup performance: Third round, 1989–90
- Best FA Trophy performance: Third round, 1986–87
- Best FA Vase performance: Winners, 2001–02, 2008–09, 2009–10, 2010–11
- Best FA Amateur Cup performance: Semi-finals, 1965–66, 1968–69

=== Attendances ===
- Record Attendance, (Hillheads Park) – 7,301 (v. Hendon – FA Amateur Cup, 1965)
- Record Attendance, (St James Park, Newcastle) – 17,048 (v. North Shields – Northumberland Senior Cup Final, 1953)

=== Results ===
- Record Win – 12–0 (v. Shildon, 1961)
- Record Defeat – 9–0 (v. Hebburn Town, 2019)

=== Goals ===
- Most goals scored in a season – 112 (1964–65)
- Fewest goals scored in a season – 31 (1979–80)
- Most goals conceded in a season – 97 (1994–95, 2014–15)
- Fewest goals conceded in a season – 26 (1969–70)

=== Player ===
- Record Appearances – Bill Chater – 641
- Record Goalscorer – Billy Wright – 307
- Most goals scored by a single player in a season – Billy Wright – 51 (1964–65)
- Most goals scored by a single player in a match – Ken Bowron – 6 (1961–62)
- Record transfer fee received – £10,000 for Kevin Todd to Berwick Rangers
- Consecutive league games with goals – Jack Foalle – 12 games
