= A.F.C. Stoneham =

Association football club in England

Coordinates: 50°56′52″N 1°22′25″W

AFC Stoneham
- Full name: A.F.C. Stoneham
- Nickname: The Purples
- Founded: 1919
- Ground: Stoneham Football Complex, Eastleigh
- Chairman: Mark Stupple
- Manager: James Phillips
- League: Isthmian League South Central Division
- 2025–26: Wessex League Premier Division, 1st of 20 (promoted)
- Website: afcstoneham.co.uk
Home colours	Away colours

A.F.C. Stoneham is a football club based in Eastleigh, Hampshire, England. They are currently members of the Isthmian League South Central Division and play at the Stoneham Football Complex.

== History ==
The club was established in 1919 by demobilised soldiers under the name Royal Engineers (Ordnance Survey Office). They joined the Southampton Junior League and were Division B champions in 1920–21. The club were then admitted to the Divisional Section of the Hampshire League. They were runners-up in the division in their first season in the league, after which they were transferred to the East Section as the league was restructured. In 1923 the club merged with a team from the Post Office to form Southampton Civil Service F.C., playing in the West Section for the 1923–24 season, but they were re-established as a separate club for the 1924–25 season and finished as runners-up in the West Section.

League reorganisation in 1928 saw Royal Engineers (OSO) placed in the Divisional Section, before being moved to Division Two the following season amid further reorganisation. In 1929 the club were renamed Ordnance Survey. They finished bottom of Division Two in 1930–31 and left the league at the end of the 1933–34 season, dropping into the Southampton Senior League. In 1960 the club became a Sunday league team, before returning to Saturday football in 1966, joining Division 8 of the Southampton League. However, after several promotions they reached the Premier Division by 1973. They went on to win the Division One title in 1982–83 and 1992–93.

After winning the Premier Division title in 1996–97, Ordnance Survey were promoted to Division Three of the Hampshire League. They were Division Three runners-up in 1998–99, earning promotion to Division One as the league underwent reorganisation. However, they finished second-from-bottom of the division in their first season, and were relegated to Division Two. In 2004 the Hampshire League merged into the Wessex League, with the club becoming members of the new Division Three. Division Three was renamed Division Two in 2006, at the same time as the club were renamed Stoneham, reflecting their new location. After one season under the new name, they adopted their current name, also leaving the Wessex League to become founder members of the Hampshire Premier League.

Stoneham were the Hampshire Premier League's inaugural champions in 2007–08. They won the League Cup in 2009–10, and again in 2014–15, the club were promoted to Division One of the Wessex League. In 2018–19 they were Division One champions, earning promotion to the Premier Division. The 2023–24 season saw the club finish as runners-up in the Premier Division and qualify for the promotion play-offs. After beating Baffins Milton Rovers 2–1 in the semi-finals, they lost the final 1–0 to Shaftesbury.

In 2024–25 Stoneham won the Hampshire Senior Cup, beating AFC Portchester 3–0 in the final. They also won the Southampton Senior Cup with a 3–0 win over Millbrook. The 2025–26 season saw the club win four competitions; they were Wessex League Premier Division champions, earning promotion to the South Central Division of the Isthmian League, won the FA Vase final, beating Cockfosters on penalties after a 0–0 draw, retained the Southampton Senior Cup (defeating Millbrook 2–1 in the final) and won the Russell Cotes Cup, beating Fareham Town 5–2 in the final.

== Ground ==
In 1923 the club moved to the Civil Service Ground in the Shirley area of Southampton, which was shared with Southampton Civil Service and then QK Southampton. The ground was closed in 1999, after which the club played at Lordshill Recreation Ground until moving to Stoneham Park on the outskirts of Eastleigh in 2002. In 2010 the club relocated again, moving to Chestnut Avenue, the former home of the defunct Pirelli General club. They moved to the new Stoneham Football Complex in 2019.

== Honours ==
- FA Vase
  - Winners 2025–26
- Wessex League
  - Premier Division champions 2025–26
  - Division One champions 2018–19
- Hampshire Premier League
  - Champions 2007–08
  - League Cup winners 2009–10, 2014–15
- Southampton Senior League
  - Premier Division champions 1996–97
  - Division One champions 1982–83, 1992–93
- Southampton Junior League
  - Division B champions 1920–21
- Hampshire Senior Cup
  - Winners 2024–25
- Southampton Senior Cup
  - Winners 2011–12, 2012–13, 2024–25, 2025–26
- Southampton Junior B Cup
  - Winners 1936–37
- Russell Cotes Cup
  - Winners 2025–26

== Records ==
- Best FA Cup performance: Second qualifying round, 2023–24, 2024–25, 2026–27
- Best FA Trophy performance: Second qualifying round, 2026–27
- Best FA Vase performance: Winners, 2025–26
- Record attendance: 851 vs Hallen, FA Vase semi-final, 4 April 2026

== See also ==
- A.F.C. Stoneham players
