= West Auckland Town F.C. =

Association football club in England

Coordinates: 54°37′45.13″N 1°43′10.39″W

West Auckland Town
- Full name: West Auckland Town Football Club
- Nickname: West
- Founded: 1893; 133 years ago (as West Auckland)
- Ground: The Northern Metal Recycling stadium (Darlington Road), West Auckland
- Capacity: 2,000 (75 seating)
- Manager: Gareth Young
- League: Northern Premier League Division One East
- 2025–26: Northern League Division One, 4th of 19 (promoted via play-offs)
Home colours	Away colours

West Auckland Town Football Club is a football club from West Auckland, near Bishop Auckland in County Durham, England, competing in the Northern League, in the ninth tier of the English football league system. The club is most famous for being the winners of the Sir Thomas Lipton Trophy, one of the world's first international footballing competitions, twice, in 1909 and 1911.

== History ==
=== Early ===
The club was founded as "West Auckland F.C." in 1893, and initially played in the Wear Valley League (1896–1900), South Durham Alliance (1900–05) and Mid Durham League (1905–08). In 1908 they joined the Northern League.

=== Sir Thomas Lipton Trophy ===
The Trophy was initiated by businessman and sporting enthusiast Sir Thomas Lipton, who wished to see a competition between the leading football clubs of Europe. The football associations of Italy, Germany and Switzerland duly complied, but the Football Association of England refused to nominate a club. West Auckland, a lowly amateur side of coalminers from the Northern League were entered into the competition, although it has never been entirely clear why.

One plausible explanation for West Auckland's entry was that an employee of Sir Thomas Lipton's had contacts in the Northern League and put out an appeal for a team to take the English spot. An alternative explanation, popular in the town itself, is that Lipton had wanted to send Woolwich Arsenal to the Championship – an instruction to his secretary to "contact W.A." led to West Auckland being mistakenly contacted. However, a review of the facts casts doubt on this theory; at the time Woolwich Arsenal had only just been promoted from the Second Division and were not the famous club they are today, being relatively small and unsuccessful compared to many other Football League sides. In addition, there is no documentary evidence to suggest any sort of link between Sir Thomas Lipton and Woolwich Arsenal, so it is unclear why he would have chosen them ahead of any other English team. Indeed, recent research clearly shows evidence that West Auckland were the expected team.

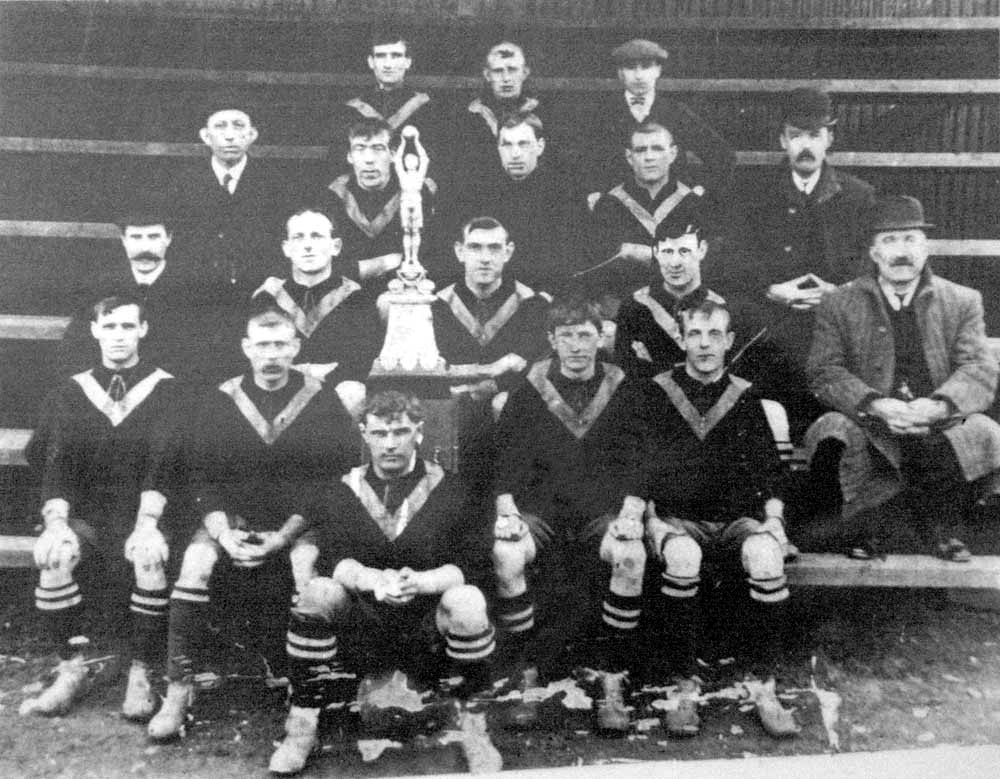
West Auckland with the Thomas Lipton Cup won in 1909

West Auckland duly made the journey to Turin, where the first tournament was being held, many of the players paying out of their own pocket to do so. They beat Sportfreunde Stuttgart in the semi-finals 2–0; in the final, on 12 April 1909, West Auckland faced Swiss side FC Winterthur and beat them 2–0 as well to take the trophy.

Two years later, West Auckland returned, and after beating FC Zürich 2–0, they ran out 6–1 winners in the final over future Italian giants Juventus. By the rules of competition, they were awarded the trophy to keep in perpetuity.

Upon their return home, the club was forced to pawn the trophy to the landlady of the local hotel because of financial problems. It remained with her family until 1960 when a village appeal raised money to return the cup to the club. The cup was then stolen in 1994 and despite the best efforts of local police and a £2,000 reward it was never found. An exact replica of the cup can now be found in a secure cabinet in the West Auckland Working Men's Club.

The story of the club's first success was turned into a television movie in 1982 – The World Cup: A Captain's Tale, produced by Tyne Tees Television and starring Dennis Waterman.

=== History after ===
Debts forced the club to leave the Northern League in 1912 and fold, although in 1914 it was reconstituted as "West Auckland Town F.C.", which remains to this day. Although it has never quite reached the same heights it did at the start of the 20th century, it did win the Northern League in 1960 and 1961, and were FA Amateur Cup runners-up in 1961, losing to Walthamstow Avenue. They still remain rivals with Bishop Auckland to this day. Having been founded in 1889, the Northern League is the oldest surviving league after The Football League.

In the 1998–99 season West Auckland reached the first round proper of the F.A. Cup for the third time with an away tie against Yeovil Town. After a 2–2 draw at Yeovil and a 1–1 draw at West Auckland, a penalty shoot-out saw Yeovil through. David Bayles took charge in the summer of 2005 and led the side to 5th place in his first season (2005–06) and then 6th place in the following season. 2007–08 began with an FA Cup run that saw West within minutes of a place in the final qualifying round of the FA Cup before defeat in a replay to Bamber Bridge. After his shock resignation, Lee Ellison had a short lived spell as manager before Phil Owers took over and steadied the side and led them to escape the drop zone. Owers departed early in the 2008–09 season with Brian Fairhurst appointed as the new player-manager. However, after 10 games without a win, Ray Gowan came in but even he was unable to arrest the slide and promptly resigned at the end of the campaign. West Auckland were able to retain their First Division status, however, due to Sunderland Nissan folding. The club then received the news that, to celebrate their centenary of winning the Sir Thomas Lipton Trophy, Juventus had agreed to a re-match in Italy, which the Italian club's under-20 team won 7–1. Shortly afterwards Hartlepool legend Brian Honour was appointed the new manager in the hot seat.

Fairhurst and his successor Wilf Constantine struggled to get West back on track and both had short lived spells in charge. For the third season in a row, a new manager was appointed – Peter Dixon arrived on 7 December 2009, swapping a promotion push with Crook for a relegation battle. West finished the season in 16th place despite having a −41 goal difference and 5 points from 19 matches when Dixon took the reins.

In both 2011–12 and 2013–14 West Auckland reached the final of the FA Vase, held at Wembley Stadium. In 2012 they lost 2–0 against fellow Northern League side Dunston UTS and two years later, lost 1–0 to Sholing with a deflected goal separating the sides whilst Jonathan Gibson hit the post in stoppage time. After Dixon's departure a difficult spell followed with several managerial appointments being short lived. In 2017–18 Gary Forrest joined the club; in the 2018–19 season West Auckland reached the FA Vase quarter-final before losing to Chertsey Town.

== Current squad ==
As of 21 August 2026

Note: Flags indicate national team as defined under FIFA eligibility rules; some limited exceptions apply. Players may hold more than one non-FIFA nationality.

No.	Pos.	Nation	Player
—	GK	POL	Piotr Banda
—	GK	ENG	Steven Bessent
—	GK	ENG	Matty Cassap
—	GK	ENG	Zach Wilkinson
—	DF	ENG	Oscar Eckley-Aldsworth
—	DF	SCO	Liam Hegarty
—	DF	ENG	James Hughes
—	DF	ENG	Joey Hope
—	DF	ENG	Josh Scott
—	DF	ENG	Alexander Walker

No.	Pos.	Nation	Player
—	MF	ENG	Nathan Carlyon
—	MF	ENG	James Harrison
—	MF	ENG	Adam Mitchell
—	MF	ENG	Tyler Richardson
—	MF	ENG	Ben Trotter
—	MF	ENG	Wayne Whitfield
—	FW	ENG	Cieran Jackson
—	FW	ENG	Cobi Jones
—	FW	ENG	Finley O'Gorman
—	FW	ENG	Connor Shields

== Records ==
- Best FA Cup performance: First round, 1959–60, 1961–62 (replay), 1988–89 (replay)
- Best FA Trophy performance: First round, 1976–77, 1994–95
- Best FA Vase performance: Runners-up, 2011–12, 2013–14
- Best FA Amateur Cup performance: Runners-up, 1960–61

== Honours ==
League

- Northern League
  - Champions: 1959–60
- Northern League Division Two
  - Champions: 1990–91

Cup

- Sir Thomas Lipton Trophy
  - Winners: 1909, 1911
- FA Amateur Cup
  - Runners-up: 1960–61
- FA Vase
  - Runners-up: 2011–12, 2013–14
- Durham Challenge Cup
  - Winners: 1963–64, 2020–21, 2023–24
- JR Cleator Cup
  - Runners-up: 2021
- Northern League Cup
  - Winners: 1959–60, 1962–63, 2018–19
- Durham Benevolent Bowl
  - Winners: 1960–61, 1962–63
