= FA Vase =

Association football tournament in England

- Founded: 1974; 52 years ago
- Region: England, Wales, Channel Islands, Isle of Man (The FA)
- Teams: c. 600
- Current champions: A.F.C. Stoneham (1st title)
- Most championships: Whitley Bay (4 titles)
- Broadcaster(s): TNT Sports (final only)
- 2026–27 FA Vase

The Football Association Challenge Vase, also known as the FA Vase, is an annual football competition run by and named after The Football Association (The FA), for teams playing in Steps 5 and 6 of the English National League System (steps 9 and 10 of the overall English football league system). Nearly 600 teams participate in this knockout competition with semi-finals played over two legs. The final is played at Wembley Stadium.

The current winners are A.F.C. Stoneham, who beat Cockfosters on penalties in the 2026 final.

== History ==
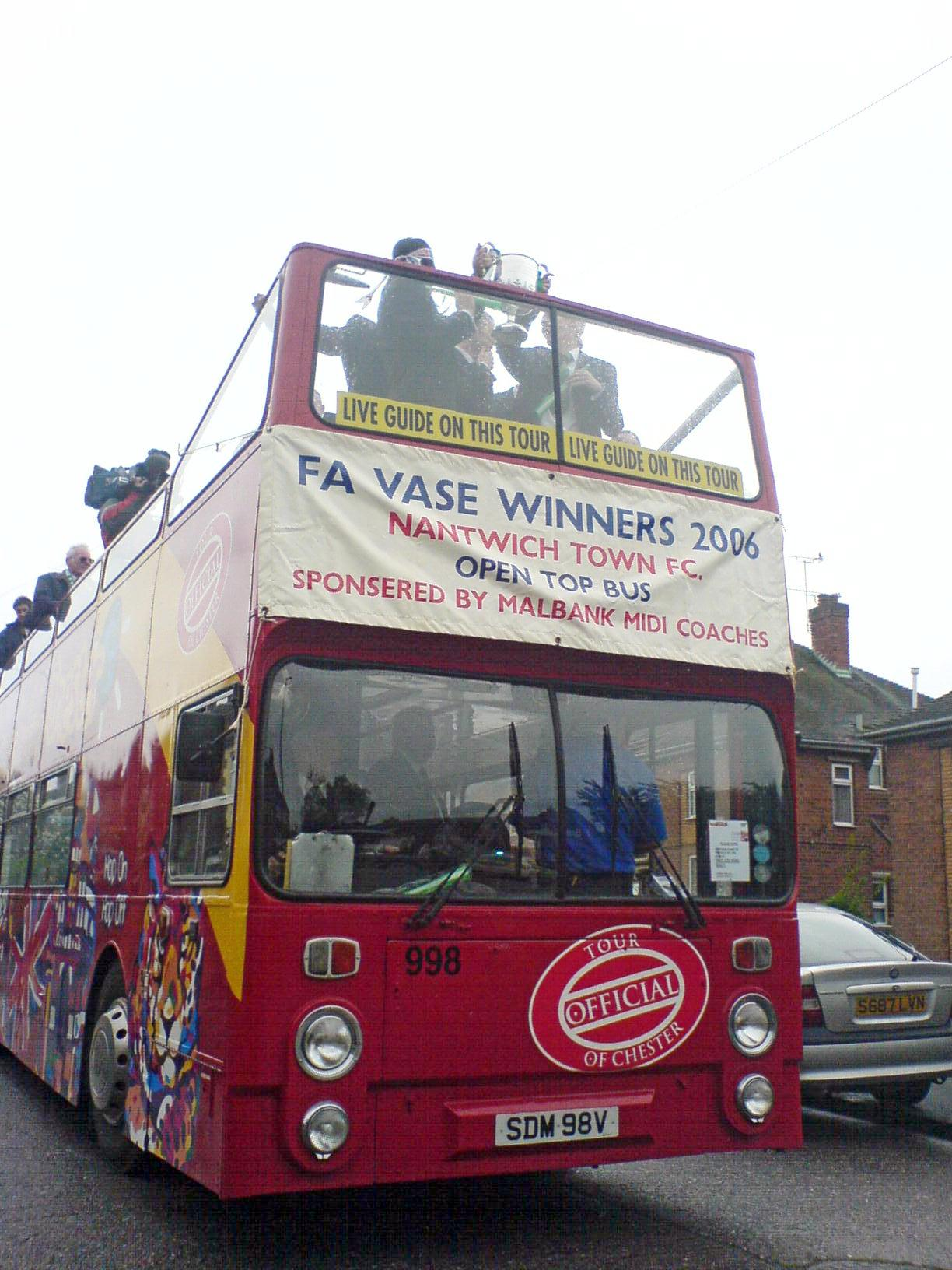
Nantwich Town celebrate winning the Vase after beating Hillingdon Borough in the final in 2006.

Until 1974, football players were categorised as either professionals or amateurs. Amateurs were not paid (at least not officially) by their clubs; amateur clubs had their own national cup competition, the FA Amateur Cup. Professionals were paid to play by their clubs; until the creation of the FA Trophy in 1969 there was no national knock-out competition specifically for professional clubs outside the Football League.

In 1974, with many of the top amateur players receiving payment for playing, the Football Association abolished the distinction, scrapped the Amateur Cup and introduced the FA Vase for the majority of clubs who had previously played in the competition. Well over 200 clubs entered in the first season, 1974–75, when Hoddesdon Town of the Spartan League beat Epsom & Ewell of the Surrey Senior League 2–1 in the final at Wembley Stadium before a crowd of 9,000.

In September 2021 Hinckley AFC set a new record score in the competition, beating St Martins 18–0.

== Eligibility ==
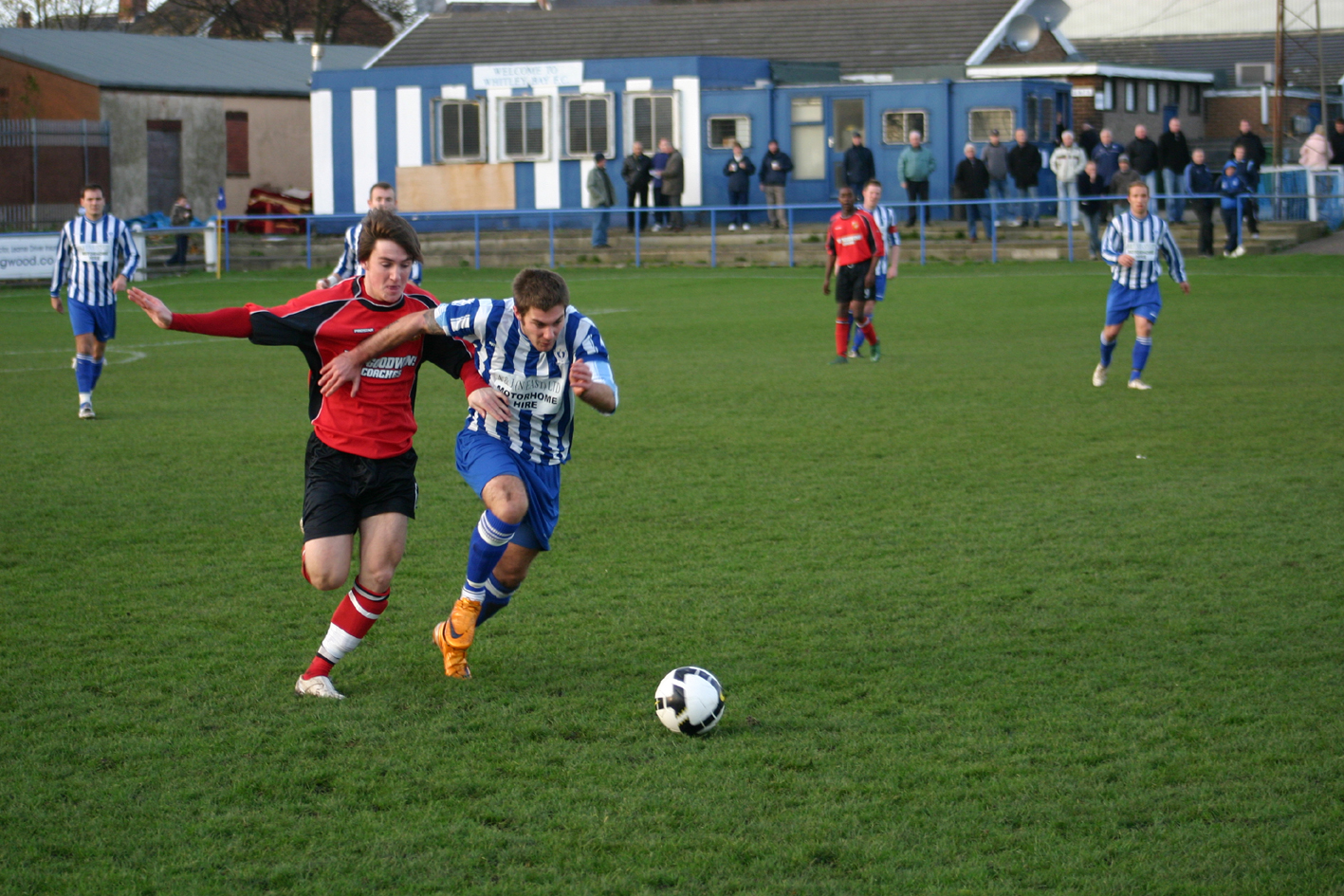
Whitley Bay take on Abbey Hey in an FA Vase match in 2008

In recent years, entry to the FA Vase has been restricted to clubs in the ninth and lower tiers of the English football league system (those in the four levels above the ninth qualified for the FA Trophy). Reorganisation of the National League System for 2004 onwards moved the dividing line down to the new "Step 5" (ninth tier overall). Clubs from the Channel Islands (First Tower United, St. Martins and Vale Recreation) and the Isle of Man (Douglas HSOB) also entered the Vase in the past. Guernsey F.C., who were formed in 2011 and played in the "Step 5" Combined Counties League, gained entry for the 2012–13 season and reached the semi-finals.

=== Exemptions ===
- Eligible teams who played in the FA Vase the previous season and participated in the fourth round proper are exempt from qualifying, and start play in the second round proper of the Vase, unless they were promoted to a Step 4 league. (If they were promoted, they would play for the FA Trophy instead.)
- Those teams that lost in the third round proper the previous season are, unless promoted to the Trophy, exempt until the first round proper.

== Finals ==
Only five teams have won the FA Vase more than once. Whitley Bay are the only team to win the FA Vase three times in successive seasons, while Billericay Town, Tiverton Town and Halesowen Town have won back-to-back titles. In 2017 Forest Green Rovers became the first FA Vase winners to go on to play in the English Football League, while one former Football League team (Glossop North End) have twice been beaten finalists.

== Media coverage ==
BT Sport showed the 2016 FA Vase Final between Hereford and Morpeth Town live on 22 May as part of a double-header along with the 2016 FA Trophy Final. This has continued in more recent years. The 2025 FA Vase final was broadcast on TNT Sports 4 and Discovery+.
