= 1991–92 Northern Football League =

The 1991–92 Northern Football League season was the 94th in the history of Northern Football League, a football competition in England.

== Division One ==
Northern Football League Division One
- Season: 1991–92
- Champions: Gretna
- Promoted: Gretna
- Relegated: Shildon; Langley Park; Whickham
- Matches: 380
- Goals: 1,177 (3.1 per match)

Division One featured 17 clubs which competed in the division last season, along with three new clubs, promoted from Division Two:

- Easington Colliery
- Langley Park
- West Auckland Town

=== League table ===
Pos	Team	Pld	W	D	L	GF	GA	GD	Pts	Promotion or relegation
1	Gretna	38	25	10	3	81	33	+48	85	Promoted to the Northern Premier League Division One
2	Murton	38	23	9	6	83	36	+47	78	
3	Whitby Town	38	23	9	6	74	41	+33	78	
4	Guisborough Town	38	22	10	6	81	36	+45	76	
5	Billingham Synthonia	38	21	6	11	70	44	+26	69	
6	Blyth Spartans	38	19	8	11	63	44	+19	65	
7	South Bank	38	18	9	11	68	50	+18	63	
8	Northallerton Town	38	18	8	12	63	53	+10	62	
9	Consett	38	15	5	18	59	59	0	50	
10	Tow Law Town	38	13	11	14	60	73	−13	50	
11	Seaham Red Star	38	13	9	16	50	57	−7	48	
12	Peterlee Newtown	38	14	3	21	47	70	−23	45	
13	Newcastle Blue Star	38	14	5	19	49	52	−3	44 (Note: Newcastle Blue Star were deducted three points.)	
14	West Auckland Town	38	11	8	19	45	68	−23	41	
15	Brandon United	38	10	10	18	61	75	−14	40	
16	Ferryhill Athletic	38	10	10	18	45	60	−15	40	
17	Easington Colliery	38	11	7	20	42	61	−19	40	
18	Shildon	38	11	7	20	47	83	−36	40	Relegated to Division Two
19	Langley Park	38	7	7	24	51	89	−38	28	Relegated to Division Two
20	Whickham	38	4	5	29	38	93	−55	17	Relegated to Division Two

Source: fchd
Rules for classification: 1) points; 2) goal difference; 3) number of goals scored.

== Division Two ==
Northern Football League Division Two
- Season: 1991–92
- Champions: Stockton
- Promoted: Stockton; Durham City; Chester-le-Street Town; Hebburn
- Matches: 380
- Goals: 1,262 (3.32 per match)

Division Two featured 16 clubs which competed in the division last season, along with four new clubs.

- Clubs relegated from Division One:
  - Alnwick Town
  - Durham City
  - Stockton
- Plus:
  - Dunston Federation Brewery, joined from the Wearside Football League

=== League table ===
Pos	Team	Pld	W	D	L	GF	GA	GD	Pts	Promotion or relegation
1	Stockton	38	27	7	4	102	35	+67	88	Promoted to Division One
2	Durham City	38	26	9	3	82	24	+58	87	Promoted to Division One
3	Chester-le-Street Town	38	26	8	4	80	36	+44	86	Promoted to Division One
4	Hebburn	38	27	4	7	101	44	+57	85	Promoted to Division One
5	Dunston Federation Brewery	38	26	6	6	104	33	+71	84	
6	Prudhoe East End	38	22	4	12	61	36	+25	70	
7	Billingham Town	38	18	7	13	60	47	+13	61	
8	Crook Town	38	16	9	13	54	53	+1	57	
9	Alnwick Town	38	15	12	11	54	60	−6	57	
10	Ryhope Community	38	17	5	16	77	59	+18	56	
11	Esh Winning	38	13	9	16	76	74	+2	48	
12	Ashington	38	13	9	16	50	69	−19	48	
13	Norton & Stockton Ancients	38	11	10	17	61	69	−8	43	
14	Shotton Comrades	38	11	6	21	52	66	−14	39	
15	Horden Colliery Welfare	38	10	6	22	52	76	−24	36	
16	Washington	38	8	9	21	36	63	−27	33	
17	Evenwood Town	38	8	7	23	42	105	−63	31	
18	Darlington Cleveland Bridge	38	7	4	27	47	97	−50	25	
19	Bedlington Terriers	38	7	2	29	38	97	−59	20 (Note: Bedlington Terriers were deducted three points.)	
20	Willington	38	4	3	31	33	119	−86	15	

Source: fchd
Rules for classification: 1) points; 2) goal difference; 3) number of goals scored.
