= 1992–93 Northern Football League =

The 1992–93 Northern Football League season was the 95th in the history of Northern Football League, a football competition in England.

== Division One ==
Northern Football League Division One
- Season: 1992–93
- Champions: Whitby Town
- Relegated: Easington Colliery; Peterlee Newtown
- Matches: 380
- Goals: 1,342 (3.53 per match)

Division One featured 16 clubs which competed in the division last season, along with four new clubs, promoted from Division Two:

- Chester-le-Street Town
- Durham City
- Hebburn
- Stockton

=== League table ===
Pos	Team	Pld	W	D	L	GF	GA	GD	Pts	Promotion or relegation
1	Whitby Town	38	26	10	2	104	30	+74	88	
2	Billingham Synthonia	38	25	10	3	98	41	+57	85	
3	Guisborough Town	38	25	9	4	91	35	+56	84	
4	Blyth Spartans	38	26	4	8	83	35	+48	82	
5	Seaham Red Star	38	21	10	7	76	45	+31	73	
6	Durham City	38	21	10	7	73	51	+22	73	
7	Stockton	38	14	15	9	65	59	+6	57	
8	Murton	38	14	12	12	72	65	+7	54	
9	Chester-le-Street Town	38	15	8	15	82	82	0	53	
10	Consett	38	15	7	16	54	56	−2	52	
11	Northallerton Town	38	13	14	11	54	47	+7	50 (Note: Northallerton Town were deducted three points.)	
12	West Auckland Town	38	12	9	17	64	76	−12	45	
13	Newcastle Blue Star	38	12	6	20	64	81	−17	42	
14	Tow Law Town	38	11	8	19	65	73	−8	41	
15	Brandon United	38	11	5	22	47	81	−34	38	
16	Hebburn	38	8	11	19	74	94	−20	29 (Note: Hebburn were deducted six points.)	
17	Ferryhill Athletic	38	6	10	22	51	97	−46	28	
18	Easington Colliery	38	6	8	24	51	94	−43	26	Relegated to Division Two
19	Peterlee Newtown	38	3	9	26	40	105	−65	18	Relegated to Division Two
20	South Bank	38	3	11	24	34	95	−61	17 (Note: South Bank were deducted three points.)	Resigned from the league

Source: fchd
Rules for classification: 1) points; 2) goal difference; 3) number of goals scored.

== Division Two ==
Northern Football League Division Two
- Season: 1992–93
- Champions: Dunston Federation Brewery
- Promoted: Dunston Federation Brewery; Eppleton Colliery Welfare; Shildon
- Matches: 380
- Goals: 1,392 (3.66 per match)

Division Two featured 16 clubs which competed in the division last season, along with four new clubs.

- Clubs relegated from Division One:
  - Langley Park
  - Shildon
  - Whickham
- Plus:
  - Eppleton Colliery Welfare, joined from the Wearside Football League

=== League table ===
Pos	Team	Pld	W	D	L	GF	GA	GD	Pts	Promotion or relegation
1	Dunston Federation Brewery	38	30	5	3	139	34	+105	95	Promoted to Division One
2	Eppleton Colliery Welfare	38	27	7	4	116	51	+65	88	Promoted to Division One
3	Shildon	38	25	6	7	93	24	+69	81	Promoted to Division One
4	Billingham Town	38	24	8	6	89	36	+53	80	
5	Prudhoe East End	38	18	7	13	65	53	+12	61	
6	Evenwood Town	38	18	7	13	75	68	+7	61	
7	Whickham	38	19	3	16	71	62	+9	60	
8	Ashington	38	17	5	16	77	70	+7	56	
9	Alnwick Town	38	16	7	15	51	61	−10	55	
10	Ryhope Community	38	16	8	14	67	61	+6	53 (Note: Ryhope Community were deducted three points.)	
11	Darlington Cleveland Bridge	38	14	11	13	48	53	−5	50 (Note: Darlington Cleveland Bridge were deducted three points.)	
12	Norton & Stockton Ancients	38	13	5	20	54	79	−25	44	
13	Esh Winning	38	13	4	21	70	82	−12	43	
14	Shotton Comrades	38	11	10	17	53	74	−21	43	
15	Washington	38	10	9	19	54	74	−20	39	
16	Willington	38	12	3	23	61	106	−45	39	
17	Bedlington Terriers	38	11	3	24	64	86	−22	33 (Note: Bedlington Terriers were deducted three points.)	
18	Crook Town	38	9	9	20	45	78	−33	33 (Note: Crook Town were deducted three points.)	
19	Horden Colliery Welfare	38	6	8	24	48	99	−51	26	
20	Langley Park	38	5	7	26	52	141	−89	22	

Source: fchd
Rules for classification: 1) points; 2) goal difference; 3) number of goals scored.
