= 1970–71 Northern Football League =

The 1970–71 Northern Football League season was the 74th in the history of Northern Football League, a football competition in England.

== Clubs ==
Northern Football League
- Season: 1970–71
- Champions: Evenwood Town
- Matches: 380
- Goals: 1,296 (3.41 per match)

Division One featured 18 clubs which competed in the league last season, along with two new clubs:

- Ashington, joined from the Northern Football Alliance
- Consett, joined from the Wearside Football League

=== League table ===
Pos	Team	Pld	W	D	L	GF	GA	GD	Pts
1	Evenwood Town	38	25	7	6	94	36	+58	57
2	Durham City	38	24	6	8	79	52	+27	54
3	Ferryhill Athletic	38	22	6	10	75	58	+17	50
4	Whitby Town	38	19	11	8	82	51	+31	49
5	Blyth Spartans	38	19	7	12	74	49	+25	45
6	Whitley Bay	38	18	8	12	65	44	+21	44
7	North Shields	38	19	6	13	80	64	+16	44
8	Spennymoor United	38	16	10	12	66	50	+16	42
9	Tow Law Town	38	18	8	12	58	52	+6	42 (Note: Tow Law Town were deducted two points.)
10	South Bank	38	17	7	14	72	63	+9	41
11	Ashington	38	14	10	14	71	72	−1	38
12	Shildon	38	13	11	14	76	74	+2	37
13	Stanley United	38	13	8	17	50	86	−36	34
14	Consett	38	12	9	17	69	83	−14	33
15	West Auckland Town	38	9	13	16	41	65	−24	31
16	Billingham Synthonia	38	9	10	19	45	65	−20	28
17	Bishop Auckland	38	11	3	24	62	86	−24	25
18	Crook Town	38	8	9	21	45	66	−21	25
19	Penrith	38	6	8	24	45	87	−42	20
20	Willington	38	6	7	25	47	93	−46	19

Source: fchd
Rules for classification: 1) points; 2) goal difference; 3) number of goals scored.
