= 1978–79 Northern Football League =

The 1978–79 Northern Football League season was the 81st in the history of Northern Football League, a football competition in England.

== Clubs ==
Northern Football League
- Season: 1978–79
- Champions: Spennymoor United
- Matches: 380
- Goals: 1,239 (3.26 per match)

Division One featured 20 clubs which competed in the league last season, no new clubs joined the division this season.

=== League table ===
Pos	Team	Pld	W	D	L	GF	GA	GD	Pts
1	Spennymoor United	38	25	6	7	96	43	+53	81
2	Bishop Auckland	38	25	5	8	96	38	+58	80
3	Ashington	38	23	7	8	79	47	+32	76
4	Crook Town	38	21	10	7	63	38	+25	73
5	Blyth Spartans	38	19	12	7	81	39	+42	69
6	Consett	38	21	9	8	84	52	+32	69 (Note: Consett were deducted three points.)
7	North Shields	38	21	4	13	76	55	+21	67
8	South Bank	38	16	11	11	58	47	+11	59
9	Horden Colliery Welfare	38	17	8	13	64	56	+8	59
10	Durham City	38	15	9	14	63	62	+1	54
11	Billingham Synthonia	38	12	12	14	60	55	+5	48
12	Tow Law Town	38	12	8	18	54	63	−9	44
13	Shildon	38	11	10	17	52	69	−17	43
14	Whitby Town	38	11	12	15	55	68	−13	42 (Note: Whitby Town were deducted three points.)
15	Whitley Bay	38	9	9	20	54	77	−23	36
16	West Auckland Town	38	9	9	20	54	87	−33	36
17	Ferryhill Athletic	38	10	5	23	43	74	−31	35
18	Willington	38	7	10	21	41	75	−34	31
19	Penrith	38	8	7	23	35	82	−47	31
20	Evenwood Town	38	4	5	29	31	112	−81	14 (Note: Evenwood Town were deducted three points.)

Source: fchd
Rules for classification: 1) points; 2) goal difference; 3) number of goals scored.
