= 1975–76 Northern Football League =

The 1975–76 Northern Football League season was the 78th in the history of Northern Football League, a football competition in England.

== Clubs ==
Northern Football League
- Season: 1975–76
- Champions: Blyth Spartans
- Matches: 380
- Goals: 1,193 (3.14 per match)

Division One featured 19 clubs which competed in the league last season, along with one new club:

- Horden Colliery Welfare, joined from the Wearside Football League

=== League table ===
Pos	Team	Pld	W	D	L	GF	GA	GD	Pts
1	Blyth Spartans	38	28	4	6	88	36	+52	88
2	Willington	38	27	6	5	102	43	+59	87
3	Spennymoor United	38	27	6	5	90	43	+47	87
4	Bishop Auckland	38	25	8	5	75	32	+43	83
5	Tow Law Town	38	22	8	8	102	60	+42	74
6	Whitby Town	38	21	11	6	76	36	+40	74
7	Ashington	38	18	4	16	60	52	+8	58
8	North Shields	38	15	7	16	57	49	+8	52
9	Consett	38	15	6	17	53	56	−3	51
10	Evenwood Town	38	11	11	16	50	58	−8	44
11	Horden Colliery Welfare	38	11	10	17	42	62	−20	43
12	Penrith	38	11	10	17	49	89	−40	43
13	Durham City	38	10	10	18	35	56	−21	40
14	Billingham Synthonia	38	10	8	20	39	67	−28	38
15	Crook Town	38	9	10	19	55	68	−13	37
16	Shildon	38	9	10	19	43	61	−18	37
17	Whitley Bay	38	8	11	19	41	74	−33	35
18	Ferryhill Athletic	38	8	9	21	51	73	−22	33
19	South Bank	38	7	8	23	41	80	−39	29
20	West Auckland Town	38	7	5	26	44	98	−54	26

Source: fchd
Rules for classification: 1) points; 2) goal difference; 3) number of goals scored.
