= 1998–99 Northern Football League =

The 1998–99 Northern Football League season was the 101st in the history of Northern Football League, a football competition in England. Division One was won by Bedlington Terriers and Division Two was won by Durham City. Bedlington opted against promotion to the Northern Premier League.

The league held two cup competitions. The Northern League Cup, competed for by all Northern League sides, was won by Dunston Federation. They beat Jarrow Roofing 4–1 in the final. The Craven Cup, for Division Two teams, was won by Ashington defeating Evenwood Town 1–0 in the final.

== Division One ==
Northern Football League Division One
- Season: 1998–99
- Champions: Bedlington Terriers
- Relegated: Newcastle Blue Star; Penrith; Shildon
- Matches: 380
- Goals: 1,332 (3.51 per match)

Division One featured 17 clubs which competed in the division last season, along with three new clubs, promoted from Division Two:

- Chester-le-Street Town
- Marske United
- West Auckland Town

Also, RTM Newcastle changed name to Newcastle Blue Star.

=== League table ===
Pos	Team	Pld	W	D	L	GF	GA	GD	Pts	Promotion or relegation
1	Bedlington Terriers	38	33	2	3	128	37	+91	101	
2	Tow Law Town	38	23	6	9	80	49	+31	75	
3	Chester-le-Street Town	38	17	14	7	71	46	+25	65	
4	Dunston Federation Brewery	38	18	10	10	75	53	+22	64	
5	West Auckland Town	38	19	7	12	67	62	+5	64	
6	Guisborough Town	38	18	5	15	68	65	+3	59	
7	Seaham Red Star	38	16	7	15	62	59	+3	55	
8	Consett	38	15	7	16	72	64	+8	52	
9	Morpeth Town	38	15	6	17	54	60	−6	51	
10	Stockton	38	15	6	17	68	76	−8	51	
11	Billingham Synthonia	38	15	7	16	60	56	+4	49 (Note: Billingham Synthonia were deducted three points.)	
12	Marske United	38	13	9	16	58	63	−5	48	
13	Crook Town	38	13	7	18	51	60	−9	46	
14	South Shields	38	10	15	13	57	66	−9	45	
15	Billingham Town	38	13	9	16	66	81	−15	45 (Note: Billingham Town were deducted three points.)	
16	Jarrow Roofing	38	11	10	17	62	85	−23	43	
17	Easington Colliery	38	11	6	21	67	78	−11	39	
18	Newcastle Blue Star	38	12	5	21	59	83	−24	38 (Note: Newcastle Blue Star were deducted three points.)	Relegated to Division Two
19	Penrith	38	10	8	20	59	82	−23	35 (Note: Penrith were deducted three points.)	Relegated to Division Two
20	Shildon	38	6	8	24	48	107	−59	26	Relegated to Division Two

Source: fchd
Rules for classification: 1) points; 2) goal difference; 3) number of goals scored.

== Division Two ==
Northern Football League Division Two
- Season: 1998–99
- Champions: Durham City
- Promoted: Durham City; Shotton Comrades; Peterlee Newtown
- Matches: 342
- Goals: 1,211 (3.54 per match)

Division Two featured 16 clubs which competed in the division last season, along with three new clubs, relegated from Division One:

- Durham City
- Murton
- Northallerton Town

=== League table ===
Pos	Team	Pld	W	D	L	GF	GA	GD	Pts	Promotion or relegation
1	Durham City	36	29	4	3	101	28	+73	91	Promoted to Division One
2	Shotton Comrades	36	22	7	7	89	44	+45	73	Promoted to Division One
3	Peterlee Newtown	36	21	8	7	79	43	+36	71	Promoted to Division One
4	Northallerton Town	36	20	6	10	73	34	+39	66	
5	Norton & Stockton Ancients	36	20	6	10	73	43	+30	66	
6	Brandon United	36	17	8	11	87	49	+38	59	
7	Hebburn	36	18	4	14	66	53	+13	58	
8	Evenwood Town	36	15	10	11	82	63	+19	55	
9	Whickham	36	15	8	13	51	43	+8	53	
10	Prudhoe Town	36	14	10	12	70	61	+9	52	
11	Ashington	36	14	9	13	64	47	+17	51	
12	Alnwick Town	36	15	5	16	63	66	−3	50	
13	Horden Colliery Welfare	36	13	11	12	52	56	−4	50	
14	Willington	36	13	10	13	58	53	+5	49	
15	Esh Winning	36	9	10	17	59	73	−14	37	
16	Washington	36	10	6	20	55	78	−23	36	
17	Ryhope Community	36	5	3	28	30	90	−60	18	
18	Murton	36	4	2	30	33	167	−134	14	
19	Eppleton Colliery Welfare	36	4	1	31	26	120	−94	7 (Note: Eppleton Colliery Welfare were deducted six points.)	

Source: fchd
Rules for classification: 1) points; 2) goal difference; 3) number of goals scored.

== Cup Competitions ==
=== Northern League Cup ===
Quarterfinals
Jarrow Roofing	2
West Auckland Town	1
South Shields	2
Consett	1
Bedlington Terriers	0
Morpeth Town	1
Guisborough Town	2
Dunston Federation Brewery	3

Semifinals
Jarrow Roofing	2
South Shields	2
Morpeth Town	0
Dunston Federation Brewery	3

Final
Dunston Federation Brewery	4
Jarrow Roofing	1

=== Craven Cup ===
For Division Two teams

Quarterfinals
Ashington	1
Brandon United	1
Washington	0
Durham City	1
Esh Winning	4
Willington	3
Northallerton Town	0
Evenwood Town	1

Semifinals
Ashington	1
Durham City	0
Esh Winning	0
Evenwood Town	2

Final
Ashington	1
Evenwood Town	0
