= 1968–69 Northern Football League =

The 1968–69 Northern Football League season was the 72nd in the history of Northern Football League, a football competition in England.

== Clubs ==
Northern Football League
- Season: 1968–69
- Champions: North Shields
- Matches: 306
- Goals: 1,155 (3.77 per match)

Division One featured 18 clubs which competed in the league last season, no new clubs joined the league this season.

=== League table ===
Pos	Team	Pld	W	D	L	GF	GA	GD	Pts
1	North Shields	34	26	2	6	106	29	+77	54
2	Whitley Bay	34	22	9	3	86	37	+49	53
3	Tow Law Town	34	23	4	7	110	61	+49	50
4	Evenwood Town	34	22	4	8	81	50	+31	48
5	Blyth Spartans	34	18	9	7	76	36	+40	45
6	Whitby Town	34	20	5	9	71	55	+16	45
7	Spennymoor United	34	15	9	10	73	52	+21	39
8	Billingham Synthonia	34	16	5	13	74	61	+13	37
9	South Bank	34	14	9	11	58	51	+7	37
10	Shildon	34	16	4	14	61	58	+3	36
11	Crook Town	34	14	7	13	59	59	0	35
12	West Auckland Town	34	10	6	18	55	69	−14	26
13	Penrith	34	8	6	20	37	68	−31	22
14	Durham City	34	9	4	21	49	81	−32	22
15	Bishop Auckland	34	8	2	24	43	98	−55	18
16	Willington	34	6	5	23	33	94	−61	17
17	Ferryhill Athletic	34	3	9	22	33	83	−50	15
18	Stanley United	34	5	3	26	50	113	−63	13

Source: fchd
Rules for classification: 1) points; 2) goal difference; 3) number of goals scored.
