= 1969–70 Northern Football League =

The 1969–70 Northern Football League season was the 73rd in the history of Northern Football League, a football competition in England.

== Clubs ==
Northern Football League
- Season: 1969–70
- Champions: Evenwood Town
- Matches: 306
- Goals: 1,012 (3.31 per match)

Division One featured 18 clubs which competed in the league last season, no new clubs joined the league this season.

=== League table ===
Pos	Team	Pld	W	D	L	GF	GA	GD	Pts
1	Evenwood Town	34	26	5	3	83	34	+49	57
2	Whitley Bay	34	23	6	5	78	26	+52	52
3	Blyth Spartans	34	23	6	5	92	34	+58	52
4	Spennymoor United	34	20	5	9	80	48	+32	45
5	Durham City	34	15	9	10	53	40	+13	39
6	North Shields	34	18	5	11	71	57	+14	39 (Note: North Shields were deducted two points.)
7	South Bank	34	14	7	13	55	51	+4	35
8	Billingham Synthonia	34	12	10	12	61	62	−1	34
9	Tow Law Town	34	13	8	13	55	51	+4	32 (Note: Tow Law Town were deducted two points.)
10	Whitby Town	34	11	10	13	45	49	−4	32
11	Shildon	34	10	12	12	53	59	−6	32
12	Bishop Auckland	34	6	14	14	43	68	−25	26
13	West Auckland Town	34	7	11	16	37	43	−6	25
14	Penrith	34	7	11	16	47	72	−25	25
15	Stanley United	34	10	4	20	37	86	−49	24
16	Willington	34	8	6	20	45	76	−31	22
17	Crook Town	34	6	9	19	45	73	−28	21
18	Ferryhill Athletic	34	5	6	23	32	83	−51	14 (Note: Ferryhill Athletic were deducted two points.)

Source: fchd
Rules for classification: 1) points; 2) goal difference; 3) number of goals scored.
