= 1966–67 Northern Football League =

The 1966–67 Northern Football League season was the 70th in the history of Northern Football League, a football competition in England.

== Clubs ==
Northern Football League
- Season: 1966–67
- Champions: Bishop Auckland
- Matches: 306
- Goals: 1,184 (3.87 per match)

Division One featured 18 clubs which competed in the league last season, no new clubs joined the league this season.

=== League table ===
Pos	Team	Pld	W	D	L	GF	GA	GR	Pts
1	Bishop Auckland	34	23	8	3	85	34	2.500	54
2	Whitley Bay	34	19	10	5	72	37	1.946	48
3	North Shields	34	20	6	8	90	43	2.093	46
4	Tow Law Town	34	20	4	10	76	42	1.810	44
5	Spennymoor United	34	15	10	9	65	52	1.250	40
6	Crook Town	34	15	9	10	74	62	1.194	39
7	Billingham Synthonia	34	15	8	11	61	46	1.326	38
8	West Auckland Town	34	17	3	14	59	54	1.093	37
9	Blyth Spartans	34	16	4	14	69	63	1.095	36
10	Whitby Town	34	16	4	14	85	75	1.133	34 (Note: Whitby Town were deducted two points.)
11	Penrith	34	11	9	14	71	72	0.986	31
12	Stanley United	34	13	5	16	62	70	0.886	31
13	Evenwood Town	34	13	5	16	57	58	0.983	27 (Note: Evenwood Town were deducted four points.)
14	Ferryhill Athletic	34	10	7	17	56	75	0.747	27
15	Shildon	34	12	3	19	65	88	0.739	27
16	Willington	34	6	8	20	45	77	0.584	20
17	Durham City	34	5	4	25	48	128	0.375	14
18	South Bank	34	4	5	25	44	108	0.407	13

Source: fchd
Rules for classification: 1) points; 2) goal difference; 3) number of goals scored.
