= 2007–08 Northern Football League =

The 2007–08 Northern Football League season was the 110th in the history of Northern Football League, a football competition in England.

== Division One ==
Northern Football League Division One
- Season: 2007–08
- Champions: Durham City
- Promoted: Durham City
- Relegated: Washington; Jarrow Roofing BCA
- Matches: 462
- Goals: 1,529 (3.31 per match)

Division One featured 19 clubs which competed in the division last season, along with three new clubs, promoted from Division Two:

- Seaham Red Star
- Spennymoor Town
- Washington

Also, Dunston Federation Brewery changed name to Dunston Federation, while Newcastle Benfield (Bay Plastics) changed name to Newcastle Benfield.

=== League table ===
Pos	Team	Pld	W	D	L	GF	GA	GD	Pts	Promotion or relegation
1	Durham City	42	32	6	4	106	42	+64	102	Promoted to the Northern Premier League Division One North
2	Consett	42	26	8	8	105	43	+62	86	
3	Whitley Bay	42	26	7	9	99	55	+44	85	
4	Newcastle Benfield	42	22	7	13	67	51	+16	73	
5	Shildon	42	22	6	14	80	53	+27	72	
6	Dunston Federation	42	19	11	12	67	59	+8	68	
7	Tow Law Town	42	21	5	16	70	63	+7	68	
8	Morpeth Town	42	18	10	14	78	64	+14	64	
9	Billingham Synthonia	42	19	7	16	63	63	0	64	
10	Billingham Town	42	19	6	17	80	73	+7	63	
11	Sunderland Nissan	42	17	12	13	70	64	+6	63	
12	Spennymoor Town	42	14	14	14	68	52	+16	56	
13	West Allotment Celtic	42	16	8	18	75	80	−5	56	
14	Seaham Red Star	42	14	10	18	78	83	−5	52	
15	Bedlington Terriers	42	12	10	20	60	80	−20	46	
16	West Auckland Town	42	12	9	21	65	81	−16	45	
17	Ashington	42	12	9	21	50	77	−27	45	
18	Chester-le-Street Town	42	12	9	21	51	86	−35	45	
19	Northallerton Town	42	13	4	25	53	85	−32	43	
20	Bishop Auckland	42	12	6	24	55	82	−27	42	
21	Washington	42	12	5	25	53	97	−44	41	Relegated to Division Two
22	Jarrow Roofing BCA	42	4	7	31	36	96	−60	19	Relegated to Division Two

Source: fchd
Rules for classification: 1) points; 2) goal difference; 3) number of goals scored.

== Division Two ==
Northern Football League Division Two
- Season: 2007–08
- Champions: Penrith Town
- Promoted: Penrith Town; Ryton; South Shields
- Matches: 380
- Goals: 1,330 (3.5 per match)

Division Two featured 17 clubs which competed in the division last season, along with three new clubs:

- Birtley Town, promoted from the Wearside Football League
- Darlington Railway Athletic, relegated from Division One
- Horden Colliery Welfare, relegated from Division One

Also, Penrith changed name to Penrith Town.

=== League table ===
Pos	Team	Pld	W	D	L	GF	GA	GD	Pts	Promotion
1	Penrith Town	38	24	7	7	78	40	+38	79	Promoted to Division One
2	South Shields	38	24	5	9	98	52	+46	77	Promoted to Division One
3	Ryton	38	24	3	11	83	41	+42	75	Promoted to Division One
4	Sunderland RCA	38	22	4	12	83	54	+29	70	
5	Horden Colliery Welfare	38	21	5	12	71	57	+14	68	
6	Whickham	38	20	6	12	87	73	+14	66	
7	Thornaby	38	18	7	13	78	64	+14	61	
8	Marske United	38	17	8	13	69	43	+26	59	
9	Stokesley Sports Club	38	17	5	16	68	71	−3	56	
10	Norton & Stockton Ancients	38	17	3	18	66	46	+20	54	
11	Birtley Town	38	16	6	16	57	66	−9	54	
12	Guisborough Town	38	16	5	17	73	64	+9	53	
13	Esh Winning	38	15	7	16	73	58	+15	52	
14	Crook Town	38	14	9	15	60	74	−14	51	
15	Hebburn Town	38	14	7	17	55	72	−17	49	
16	Prudhoe Town	38	13	9	16	61	68	−7	48	
17	North Shields	38	11	4	23	50	87	−37	37	
18	Darlington Railway Athletic	38	10	6	22	51	78	−27	36	
19	Team Northumbria	38	6	8	24	43	90	−47	23 (Note: Team Northumbria were deducted three points.)	
20	Brandon United	38	2	4	32	26	132	−106	10	

Source: fchd
Rules for classification: 1) points; 2) goal difference; 3) number of goals scored.
