= 1977–78 Northern Football League =

The 1977–78 Northern Football League season was the 80th in the history of Northern Football League, a football competition in England.

== Clubs ==
Northern Football League
- Season: 1977–78
- Champions: Spennymoor United
- Matches: 380
- Goals: 1,187 (3.12 per match)

Division One featured 20 clubs which competed in the league last season, no new clubs joined the division this season.

=== League table ===
Pos	Team	Pld	W	D	L	GF	GA	GD	Pts
1	Spennymoor United	38	30	5	3	103	36	+67	95
2	Blyth Spartans	38	27	8	3	107	37	+70	89
3	Whitby Town	38	22	7	9	84	61	+23	73
4	Bishop Auckland	38	22	6	10	82	44	+38	72
5	Consett	38	19	7	12	78	49	+29	64
6	Horden Colliery Welfare	38	19	6	13	53	44	+9	63
7	North Shields	38	16	10	12	55	39	+16	55 (Note: North Shields were deducted three points.)
8	Durham City	38	15	9	14	55	51	+4	54
9	Willington	38	16	6	16	53	62	−9	54
10	Crook Town	38	12	17	9	56	47	+9	53
11	West Auckland Town	38	12	15	11	49	51	−2	51
12	Billingham Synthonia	38	14	8	16	65	64	+1	50
13	South Bank	38	12	13	13	40	43	−3	49
14	Whitley Bay	38	13	7	18	46	66	−20	46
15	Ashington	38	15	7	16	56	54	+2	43 (Note: Ashington were deducted nine points.)
16	Shildon	38	11	8	19	55	64	−9	41
17	Tow Law Town	38	9	5	24	59	103	−44	32
18	Ferryhill Athletic	38	8	8	22	30	69	−39	32
19	Evenwood Town	38	4	5	29	36	90	−54	17
20	Penrith	38	3	5	30	25	113	−88	14

Source: fchd
Rules for classification: 1) points; 2) goal difference; 3) number of goals scored.
