= 1971–72 Northern Football League =

The 1971–72 Northern Football League season was the 74th in the history of Northern Football League, a football competition in England.

== Clubs ==
Northern Football League
- Season: 1971–72
- Champions: Spennymoor United
- Matches: 380
- Goals: 1,301 (3.42 per match)

Division One featured 20 clubs which competed in the league last season, no new clubs joined the division this season.

=== League table ===
Pos	Team	Pld	W	D	L	GF	GA	GD	Pts
1	Spennymoor United	38	29	6	3	103	26	+77	64
2	Blyth Spartans	38	24	7	7	85	42	+43	55
3	Whitley Bay	38	20	10	8	66	29	+37	48 (Note: Whitley Bay were deducted two points.)
4	Durham City	38	20	8	10	78	51	+27	48
5	Consett	38	20	6	12	78	58	+20	46
6	Shildon	38	18	9	11	98	69	+29	45
7	Whitby Town	38	18	8	12	75	59	+16	44
8	Tow Law Town	38	17	10	11	83	72	+11	44
9	Evenwood Town	38	17	9	12	65	57	+8	43
10	North Shields	38	14	12	12	61	51	+10	40
11	Ferryhill Athletic	38	16	8	14	60	58	+2	40
12	Willington	38	15	8	15	72	59	+13	38
13	South Bank	38	13	7	18	54	76	−22	33
14	Penrith	38	13	6	19	52	69	−17	32
15	Billingham Synthonia	38	11	8	19	55	75	−20	30
16	Crook Town	38	5	16	17	50	81	−31	26
17	Bishop Auckland	38	8	9	21	42	72	−30	25
18	Ashington	38	8	8	22	47	68	−21	24
19	West Auckland Town	38	6	8	24	45	102	−57	20
20	Stanley United	38	3	7	28	32	127	−95	11 (Note: Stanley United were deducted two points.)

Source: fchd
Rules for classification: 1) points; 2) goal difference; 3) number of goals scored.
