= 1974–75 Northern Football League =

The 1974–75 Northern Football League season was the 77th in the history of Northern Football League, a football competition in England.

== Clubs ==
Northern Football League
- Season: 1974–75
- Champions: Blyth Spartans
- Matches: 342
- Goals: 1,188 (3.47 per match)

Division One featured 19 clubs which competed in the league last season, no new clubs joined the division this season.

=== League table ===
Pos	Team	Pld	W	D	L	GF	GA	GD	Pts
1	Blyth Spartans	36	30	6	0	105	38	+67	96
2	Spennymoor United	36	27	5	4	100	38	+62	86
3	Bishop Auckland	36	23	5	8	81	33	+48	74
4	Willington	36	19	12	5	91	52	+39	69
5	Whitby Town	36	16	8	12	60	53	+7	56
6	Consett	36	14	11	11	72	72	0	53
7	Durham City	36	14	11	11	60	68	−8	53
8	Tow Law Town	36	14	10	12	59	59	0	52
9	Ashington	36	13	11	12	73	61	+12	50
10	South Bank	36	12	8	16	65	75	−10	44
11	North Shields	36	9	15	12	58	56	+2	42
12	Whitley Bay	36	11	8	17	52	65	−13	41
13	Ferryhill Athletic	36	9	12	15	52	72	−20	39
14	Billingham Synthonia	36	9	9	18	55	74	−19	36
15	Evenwood Town	36	9	7	20	40	57	−17	34
16	Crook Town	36	9	7	20	39	72	−33	34
17	Penrith	36	9	6	21	47	71	−24	33
18	Shildon	36	7	9	20	50	80	−30	30
19	West Auckland Town	36	4	8	24	29	92	−63	20

Source: fchd
Rules for classification: 1) points; 2) goal difference; 3) number of goals scored.
