= 1972–73 Northern Football League =

The 1972–73 Northern Football League season was the 75th in the history of Northern Football League, a football competition in England.

== Clubs ==
Northern Football League
- Season: 1972–73
- Champions: Blyth Spartans
- Matches: 380
- Goals: 1,204 (3.17 per match)

Division One featured 20 clubs which competed in the league last season, no new clubs joined the division this season.

=== League table ===
Pos	Team	Pld	W	D	L	GF	GA	GD	Pts
1	Blyth Spartans	38	28	3	7	102	39	+63	59
2	Bishop Auckland	38	25	7	6	76	40	+36	57
3	Willington	38	24	5	9	83	36	+47	53
4	Billingham Synthonia	38	21	7	10	76	49	+27	49
5	Spennymoor United	38	20	7	11	70	50	+20	47
6	Ferryhill Athletic	38	21	4	13	60	56	+4	46
7	Whitley Bay	38	18	8	12	67	46	+21	42 (Note: Whitley Bay were deducted two points.)
8	Shildon	38	17	5	16	72	62	+10	39
9	Ashington	38	14	10	14	51	45	+6	38
10	Durham City	38	14	8	16	58	60	−2	36
11	Consett	38	12	12	14	53	57	−4	36
12	Evenwood Town	38	15	5	18	52	66	−14	35
13	Whitby Town	38	13	7	18	58	72	−14	31 (Note: Whitby Town were deducted two points.)
14	Penrith	38	12	7	19	53	80	−27	31
15	Tow Law Town	38	11	8	19	51	68	−17	30
16	West Auckland Town	38	12	3	23	39	76	−37	27
17	Crook Town	38	9	8	21	48	67	−19	26
18	Stanley United	38	11	4	23	49	88	−39	26
19	North Shields	38	10	7	21	37	62	−25	25 (Note: North Shields were deducted two points.)
20	South Bank	38	9	3	26	49	85	−36	21

Source: fchd
Rules for classification: 1) points; 2) goal difference; 3) number of goals scored.
