= 1963–64 Northern Football League =

The 1963–64 Northern Football League season was the 67th in the history of Northern Football League, a football competition in England.

== Clubs ==
Northern Football League
- Season: 1963–64
- Champions: Stanley United
- Matches: 240
- Goals: 908 (3.78 per match)

Division One featured 16 clubs which competed in the league last season, no new clubs joined the league this season.

=== League table ===
Pos	Team	Pld	W	D	L	GF	GA	GR	Pts
1	Stanley United	30	18	7	5	94	47	2.000	43
2	Crook Town	30	17	8	5	67	28	2.393	42
3	West Auckland Town	30	15	7	8	67	44	1.523	37
4	Evenwood Town	30	13	7	10	42	38	1.105	33
5	Ferryhill Athletic	30	13	7	10	64	60	1.067	33
6	Penrith	30	14	4	12	69	54	1.278	32
7	Whitley Bay	30	14	4	12	66	52	1.269	32
8	Bishop Auckland	30	13	6	11	62	61	1.016	32
9	Whitby Town	30	13	3	14	57	52	1.096	29
10	Tow Law Town	30	12	5	13	63	60	1.050	29
11	Willington	30	11	7	12	57	73	0.781	29
12	Spennymoor United	30	11	6	13	38	51	0.745	28
13	Billingham Synthonia	30	9	7	14	25	43	0.581	25
14	Shildon	30	10	4	16	55	70	0.786	24
15	South Bank	30	9	6	15	47	78	0.603	24
16	Durham City	30	2	4	24	35	97	0.361	6 (Note: Durham City were deducted two points for playing an unregistered player.)

Source: fchd
Rules for classification: 1) points; 2) goal difference; 3) number of goals scored.
