= 1973–74 Northern Football League =

The 1973–74 Northern Football League season was the 76th in the history of Northern Football League, a football competition in England.

== Clubs ==
Northern Football League
- Season: 1973–74
- Champions: Spennymoor United
- Matches: 380
- Goals: 1,219 (3.21 per match)

Division One featured 20 clubs which competed in the league last season, no new clubs joined the division this season.

=== League table ===
Pos	Team	Pld	W	D	L	GF	GA	GD	Pts	Promotion or relegation
1	Spennymoor United	38	30	4	4	87	37	+50	64	
2	Blyth Spartans	38	30	4	4	95	32	+63	64	
3	Willington	38	21	6	11	87	60	+27	48	
4	Bishop Auckland	38	19	9	10	68	43	+25	47	
5	Billingham Synthonia	38	20	7	11	67	50	+17	47	
6	North Shields	38	17	8	13	68	52	+16	42	
7	Tow Law Town	38	18	4	16	62	63	−1	40	
8	Ashington	38	16	6	16	60	56	+4	38	
9	Penrith	38	15	8	15	56	62	−6	38	
10	Durham City	38	16	5	17	74	60	+14	37	
11	Whitley Bay	38	14	8	16	48	48	0	36	
12	Evenwood Town	38	13	10	15	63	65	−2	36	
13	Consett	38	14	7	17	61	63	−2	35	
14	Ferryhill Athletic	38	14	7	17	47	69	−22	35	
15	Shildon	38	12	9	17	59	62	−3	33	
16	Whitby Town	38	11	9	18	52	76	−24	31	
17	Crook Town	38	9	9	20	44	75	−31	27	
18	South Bank	38	8	7	23	43	77	−34	23	
19	West Auckland Town	38	5	11	22	37	83	−46	21	
20	Stanley United	38	4	10	24	41	86	−45	18	Resigned from the league

Source: fchd
Rules for classification: 1) points; 2) goal difference; 3) number of goals scored.
