= 1993–94 Northern Football League =

The 1993–94 Northern Football League season was the 96th in the history of Northern Football League, a football competition in England.

== Division One ==
Northern Football League Division One
- Season: 1993–94
- Champions: Durham City
- Promoted: Blyth Spartans
- Relegated: Brandon United; Stockton
- Matches: 380
- Goals: 1,272 (3.35 per match)

Division One featured 17 clubs which competed in the division last season, along with three new clubs, promoted from Division Two:

- Dunston Federation Brewery
- Eppleton Colliery Welfare
- Shildon

=== League table ===
| Pos | Team | Pld | W | D | L | GF | GA | GD | Pts | Promotion or relegation |
|---|---|---|---|---|---|---|---|---|---|---|
| 1 | Durham City | 38 | 23 | 11 | 4 | 88 | 39 | +49 | 80 | |
| 2 | Blyth Spartans | 38 | 22 | 7 | 9 | 81 | 37 | +44 | 73 | Promoted to the Northern Premier League Division One |
| 3 | Seaham Red Star | 38 | 20 | 10 | 8 | 70 | 40 | +30 | 70 | |
| 4 | Whitby Town | 38 | 17 | 14 | 7 | 90 | 57 | +33 | 65 | |
| 5 | Guisborough Town | 38 | 17 | 12 | 9 | 71 | 41 | +30 | 63 | |
| 6 | Northallerton Town | 38 | 18 | 7 | 13 | 68 | 39 | +29 | 61 | |
| 7 | Tow Law Town | 38 | 18 | 6 | 14 | 70 | 58 | +12 | 60 | |
| 8 | Murton | 38 | 17 | 8 | 13 | 63 | 65 | −2 | 59 | |
| 9 | Shildon | 38 | 17 | 6 | 15 | 59 | 54 | +5 | 57 | |
| 10 | Billingham Synthonia | 38 | 15 | 9 | 14 | 57 | 45 | +12 | 54 | |
| 11 | Dunston Federation Brewery | 38 | 15 | 9 | 14 | 72 | 69 | +3 | 54 | |
| 12 | Consett | 38 | 15 | 6 | 17 | 67 | 70 | −3 | 48 (Note: Consett were deducted three points.) | |
| 13 | Ferryhill Athletic | 38 | 11 | 8 | 19 | 61 | 81 | −20 | 41 | |
| 14 | Newcastle Blue Star | 38 | 11 | 8 | 19 | 44 | 65 | −21 | 41 | |
| 15 | Hebburn | 38 | 12 | 5 | 21 | 55 | 93 | −38 | 41 | |
| 16 | Eppleton Colliery Welfare | 38 | 11 | 7 | 20 | 52 | 76 | −24 | 40 | |
| 17 | Chester-le-Street Town | 38 | 13 | 5 | 20 | 64 | 74 | −10 | 38 (Note: Chester-le-Street Town were deducted six points.) | |
| 18 | West Auckland Town | 38 | 10 | 8 | 20 | 49 | 89 | −40 | 38 | |
| 19 | Brandon United | 38 | 9 | 6 | 23 | 45 | 94 | −49 | 33 | Relegated to Division Two |
| 20 | Stockton | 38 | 9 | 8 | 21 | 46 | 86 | −40 | 32 (Note: Stockton were deducted three points.) | Relegated to Division Two |

Source: fchd
Rules for classification: 1) points; 2) goal difference; 3) number of goals scored.

== Division Two ==
Northern Football League Division Two
- Season: 1993–94
- Champions: Bedlington Terriers
- Promoted: Bedlington Terriers; Peterlee Newtown; Prudhoe East End
- Matches: 342
- Goals: 1,243 (3.63 per match)

Division Two featured 17 clubs which competed in the division last season, along with two new clubs relegated from Division One:

- Easington Colliery
- Peterlee Newtown

Also, Darlington Cleveland Bridge changed name to Darlington Cleveland Social.

=== League table ===
| Pos | Team | Pld | W | D | L | GF | GA | GD | Pts | Promotion or relegation |
|---|---|---|---|---|---|---|---|---|---|---|
| 1 | Bedlington Terriers | 36 | 28 | 5 | 3 | 114 | 36 | +78 | 89 | Promoted to Division One |
| 2 | Peterlee Newtown | 36 | 23 | 9 | 4 | 77 | 27 | +50 | 78 | Promoted to Division One |
| 3 | Prudhoe East End | 36 | 21 | 9 | 6 | 72 | 36 | +36 | 72 | Promoted to Division One |
| 4 | Evenwood Town | 36 | 22 | 4 | 10 | 78 | 47 | +31 | 70 | |
| 5 | Easington Colliery | 36 | 20 | 7 | 9 | 77 | 40 | +37 | 67 | |
| 6 | Billingham Town | 36 | 21 | 3 | 12 | 88 | 49 | +39 | 66 | |
| 7 | Crook Town | 36 | 18 | 8 | 10 | 80 | 58 | +22 | 62 | |
| 8 | Norton & Stockton Ancients | 36 | 18 | 7 | 11 | 72 | 70 | +2 | 61 | |
| 9 | Darlington Cleveland Social | 36 | 18 | 2 | 16 | 65 | 68 | −3 | 56 | |
| 10 | Whickham | 36 | 16 | 7 | 13 | 71 | 64 | +7 | 52 (Note: Whickham were deducted three points.) | |
| 11 | Washington | 36 | 14 | 5 | 17 | 67 | 72 | −5 | 47 | |
| 12 | Esh Winning | 36 | 12 | 7 | 17 | 50 | 72 | −22 | 43 | |
| 13 | Langley Park | 36 | 12 | 5 | 19 | 55 | 67 | −12 | 41 | |
| 14 | Shotton Comrades | 36 | 9 | 9 | 18 | 61 | 84 | −23 | 36 | |
| 15 | Alnwick Town | 36 | 10 | 7 | 19 | 50 | 69 | −19 | 34 (Note: Alnwick Town were deducted three points.) | |
| 16 | Willington | 36 | 9 | 3 | 24 | 48 | 90 | −42 | 30 | |
| 17 | Ashington | 36 | 8 | 3 | 25 | 46 | 100 | −54 | 24 (Note: Ashington were deducted three points.) | |
| 18 | Ryhope Community | 36 | 7 | 3 | 26 | 37 | 94 | −57 | 18 (Note: Ryhope Community were deducted six points.) | |
| 19 | Horden Colliery Welfare | 36 | 3 | 3 | 30 | 35 | 100 | −65 | 12 | |

Source: fchd
Rules for classification: 1) points; 2) goal difference; 3) number of goals scored.
