= 1960–61 Northern Football League =

The 1960–61 Northern Football League season was the 63rd in the history of Northern Football League, a football competition in England.

== Clubs ==
Northern Football League
- Season: 1960–61
- Champions: West Auckland Town
- Matches: 240
- Goals: 1,041 (4.34 per match)

The league featured 15 clubs which competed in the last season, along with one new club, joined from the defunct Midland League:

- Spennymoor United

=== League table ===
Pos	Team	Pld	W	D	L	GF	GA	GR	Pts
1	West Auckland Town	30	18	8	4	77	36	2.139	44
2	Bishop Auckland	30	19	2	9	85	46	1.848	40
3	Ferryhill Athletic	30	18	4	8	80	56	1.429	40
4	Crook Town	30	15	8	7	79	51	1.549	38
5	Whitley Bay	30	15	8	7	83	57	1.456	38
6	Spennymoor United	30	14	8	8	62	37	1.676	36
7	Stanley United	30	14	7	9	61	56	1.089	35
8	South Bank	30	15	2	13	67	62	1.081	32
9	Penrith	30	11	8	11	53	63	0.841	30
10	Evenwood Town	30	8	9	13	59	59	1.000	25
11	Shildon	30	11	2	17	66	73	0.904	24
12	Billingham Synthonia	30	7	8	15	52	86	0.605	22
13	Willington	30	9	3	18	59	80	0.738	21
14	Tow Law Town	30	8	5	17	54	90	0.600	21
15	Whitby Town	30	7	6	17	52	84	0.619	18 (Note: Whitby Town were deducted two points for playing an unregistered player.)
16	Durham City	30	5	4	21	52	105	0.495	14

Source: fchd
Rules for classification: 1) points; 2) goal difference; 3) number of goals scored.
