= 1962–63 Northern Football League =

The 1962–63 Northern Football League season was the 66th in the history of Northern Football League, a football competition in England.

== Clubs ==
Northern Football League
- Season: 1962–63
- Champions: Crook Town
- Matches: 240
- Goals: 930 (3.88 per match)

Division One featured 16 clubs which competed in the league last season, no new clubs joined the league this season.

=== League table ===
Pos	Team	Pld	W	D	L	GF	GA	GR	Pts
1	Crook Town	30	21	6	3	82	30	2.733	48
2	Stanley United	30	20	4	6	78	45	1.733	44
3	Penrith	30	17	7	6	60	31	1.935	41
4	Spennymoor United	30	13	12	5	62	45	1.378	38
5	Whitley Bay	30	12	10	8	69	46	1.500	34
6	Billingham Synthonia	30	14	5	11	58	49	1.184	33
7	West Auckland Town	30	13	7	10	66	65	1.015	33
8	Bishop Auckland	30	11	6	13	68	68	1.000	28
9	Tow Law Town	30	12	3	15	62	71	0.873	27
10	Whitby Town	30	12	2	16	62	65	0.954	26
11	Durham City	30	10	6	14	49	55	0.891	26
12	Ferryhill Athletic	30	6	14	10	51	59	0.864	26
13	South Bank	30	9	5	16	46	63	0.730	23
14	Shildon	30	6	9	15	52	87	0.598	21
15	Evenwood Town	30	7	5	18	30	62	0.484	19
16	Willington	30	5	3	22	35	89	0.393	13

Source: fchd
Rules for classification: 1) points; 2) goal difference; 3) number of goals scored.
