= 1953–54 Northern Football League =

The 1953–54 Northern Football League season was the 56th in the history of the Northern Football League, a football competition in Northern England.

== Clubs ==
Northern League
- Season: 1953–54
- Champions: Bishop Auckland
- Matches: 182
- Goals: 817 (4.49 per match)

The league featured 14 clubs which competed in the last season, no new clubs joined the league this season.

=== League table ===
Pos	Team	Pld	W	D	L	GF	GA	GR	Pts
1	Bishop Auckland	26	19	4	3	97	34	2.853	42
2	Crook Town	26	19	2	5	95	38	2.500	40
3	Ferryhill Athletic	26	17	5	4	56	27	2.074	39
4	Billingham Synthonia	26	15	2	9	61	44	1.386	32
5	West Auckland Town	26	15	2	9	58	48	1.208	32
6	Durham City	26	15	2	9	62	52	1.192	32
7	Whitby Town	26	9	6	11	58	56	1.036	24
8	Willington	26	11	1	14	48	51	0.941	23
9	Evenwood Town	26	9	3	14	57	65	0.877	21
10	Tow Law Town	26	10	0	16	43	64	0.672	20
11	Penrith	26	8	1	17	39	81	0.481	17
12	Shildon	26	11	2	13	74	68	1.088	16 (Note: Shildon deducted eight points for fielding unregistered players.)
13	Stanley United	26	3	5	18	33	84	0.393	11
14	South Bank	26	3	1	22	36	105	0.343	7

Rules for classification: 1) points; 2) goal ratio.
Notes:

No changes following this season.
