= 1955–56 Northern Football League =

The 1955–56 Northern Football League season was the 58th in the history of the Northern Football League, a football competition in Northern England.

== Clubs ==
Northern League
- Season: 1955–56
- Champions: Bishop Auckland
- Matches: 182
- Goals: 847 (4.65 per match)

The league featured 14 clubs which competed in the last season, no new clubs joined the league this season.

=== League table ===
Pos	Team	Pld	W	D	L	GF	GA	GR	Pts
1	Bishop Auckland	26	18	2	6	85	54	1.574	38
2	Crook Town	26	17	3	6	92	44	2.091	37
3	Durham City	26	17	1	8	82	40	2.050	35
4	South Bank	26	12	6	8	51	37	1.378	30
5	Evenwood Town	26	12	5	9	58	49	1.184	29
6	West Auckland Town	26	13	2	11	66	51	1.294	28
7	Billingham Synthonia	26	12	3	11	58	63	0.921	27
8	Shildon	26	10	6	10	70	52	1.346	26
9	Willington	26	10	4	12	58	71	0.817	24
10	Stanley United	26	9	6	11	53	66	0.803	24
11	Ferryhill Athletic	26	8	5	13	42	62	0.677	21
12	Tow Law Town	26	6	7	13	55	80	0.688	19
13	Penrith	26	6	3	17	38	81	0.469	15
14	Whitby Town	26	4	3	19	39	97	0.402	11

Rules for classification: 1) points; 2) goal ratio.
