= 1959–60 Northern Football League =

The 1959–60 Northern Football League season was the 62nd in the history of the Northern Football League, a football competition in Northern England.

== Clubs ==
Northern League
- Season: 1959–60
- Champions: West Auckland Town
- Matches: 210
- Goals: 887 (4.22 per match)

The league featured 15 clubs which competed in the last season, no new clubs joined the league this season.

=== League table ===
Pos	Team	Pld	W	D	L	GF	GA	GR	Pts
1	West Auckland Town	28	19	4	5	63	40	1.575	42
2	Whitley Bay	28	17	6	5	76	37	2.054	40
3	Crook Town	28	18	3	7	84	50	1.680	39
4	Shildon	28	15	4	9	75	50	1.500	34
5	Bishop Auckland	28	15	4	9	55	45	1.222	34
6	Ferryhill Athletic	28	13	4	11	76	46	1.652	30
7	Tow Law Town	28	10	7	11	50	58	0.862	27
8	Stanley United	28	10	6	12	57	69	0.826	26
9	Whitby Town	28	10	5	13	61	62	0.984	25
10	Evenwood Town	28	12	3	13	65	67	0.970	25 (Note: Evenwood Town deducted two points.)
11	South Bank	28	11	3	14	55	63	0.873	25
12	Penrith	28	9	5	14	52	66	0.788	23
13	Willington	28	8	6	14	49	64	0.766	22
14	Durham City	28	4	7	17	35	84	0.417	15
15	Billingham Synthonia	28	4	3	21	34	86	0.395	11

Rules for classification: 1) points; 2) goal ratio.
