= 1954–55 Northern Football League =

The 1954–55 Northern Football League season was the 57th in the history of the Northern Football League, a football competition in Northern England.

== Clubs ==
Northern League
- Season: 1954–55
- Champions: Bishop Auckland
- Matches: 182
- Goals: 811 (4.46 per match)

The league featured 14 clubs which competed in the last season, no new clubs joined the league this season.

=== League table ===
| Pos | Team | Pld | W | D | L | GF | GA | GR | Pts |
|---|---|---|---|---|---|---|---|---|---|
| 1 | Bishop Auckland | 26 | 19 | 3 | 4 | 87 | 44 | 1.977 | 41 |
| 2 | Crook Town | 26 | 16 | 2 | 8 | 93 | 40 | 2.325 | 34 |
| 3 | Shildon | 26 | 11 | 8 | 7 | 65 | 47 | 1.383 | 30 |
| 4 | Billingham Synthonia | 26 | 12 | 6 | 8 | 62 | 49 | 1.265 | 30 |
| 5 | Evenwood Town | 26 | 12 | 6 | 8 | 67 | 59 | 1.136 | 30 |
| 6 | Stanley United | 26 | 13 | 4 | 9 | 48 | 64 | 0.750 | 30 |
| 7 | Whitby Town | 26 | 10 | 7 | 9 | 65 | 58 | 1.121 | 27 |
| 8 | Ferryhill Athletic | 26 | 9 | 8 | 9 | 58 | 57 | 1.018 | 26 |
| 9 | Willington | 26 | 11 | 3 | 12 | 42 | 46 | 0.913 | 25 |
| 10 | West Auckland Town | 26 | 8 | 7 | 11 | 58 | 67 | 0.866 | 23 |
| 11 | Tow Law Town | 26 | 8 | 5 | 13 | 45 | 72 | 0.625 | 21 |
| 12 | South Bank | 26 | 5 | 7 | 14 | 36 | 63 | 0.571 | 17 |
| 13 | Penrith | 26 | 5 | 6 | 15 | 38 | 66 | 0.576 | 16 |
| 14 | Durham City | 26 | 4 | 6 | 16 | 47 | 79 | 0.595 | 14 |

Rules for classification: 1) points; 2) goal ratio.
