= Mick Whitfield =

English footballer

Personal information
- Full name: Michael Whitfield
- Date of birth: 17 October 1962 (age 64)
- Place of birth: Sunderland, England
- Height: 5 ft 8 in (1.73 m)
- Position: Midfielder

Senior career*
Years	Team	Apps	(Gls)
1980–1983	Sunderland	3	(0)
1983–1984	Hartlepool United	16	(0)
1984–198?	Horden Colliery Welfare		
- * Club domestic league appearances and goals

Michael Whitfield (born 17 October 1962) is an English former professional footballer who played as a midfielder for Sunderland.
