= Ashington A.F.C. =

Association football club in England

Coordinates: 55.1852°N 1.5505°W

Ashington
- Full name: Ashington Association Football Club
- Nickname: The Colliers
- Founded: 1883
- Ground: Woodhorn Lane, Ashington
- Chairman: Brian Shotton
- Manager: Vacant
- League: Northern Premier League Division One East
- 2025–26: Northern Premier League Division One East, 14th of 22
- Website: ashingtonafc.com
Home colours	Away colours

Ashington Association Football Club is a football club based in Ashington, Northumberland, England. They are currently members of the Northern Premier League Division One East and play at Woodhorn Lane.

Formed in 1883, the club have played in a number of local and regional leagues, including the Northern Alliance, the East Northumberland League, the North Eastern League, the Midland League, Wearside League and the North Regional League. They were a founding member of the Football League Third Division North in 1921 and are the northernmost team to have played in the Football League. The club were later founder members of the Northern Premier League in 1968 and have been in the Northern League since 1970.

== History ==
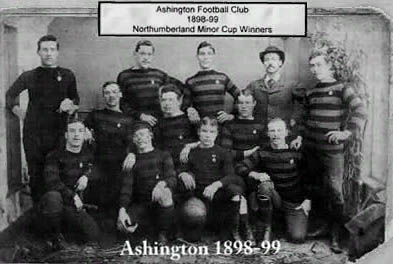
The Ashington team of 1898–99

The club was established in 1883 and began entering the FA Cup in 1887. They joined the Northern Alliance at the start of the 1892–93 season when the league was expanded to twelve clubs. However, the league was reduced to ten club the following season, and as they had finished in the bottom two, Ashington were asked to leave. The club then ceased activities, but were brought back following a large meeting, joining the East Northumberland League in 1895. They went on to win the league title in 1897–98.

Ashington applied to rejoin the Northern Alliance in 1901, but were rejected. However, the following season they were elected back into the league, finishing second in the vote to admit three clubs. They won the league in 1913–14 and moved up to the North Eastern League. When football resumed after World War I the club rejoined the North Eastern League, where they remained until being elected into the new Third Division North of the Football League in 1921. After all the applications had been considered by the League, Ashington were one of fourteen clubs marked out for admission in a single bloc, which they duly were. In 1926–27 the club recorded its best performance in the FA Cup, reaching the third round, where they lost 2–0 at home to Nottingham Forest. After finishing bottom of the division in 1928–29 the club lost their bid for re-election, receiving only 14 votes to the 24 received by non-League York City.

Ashington subsequently dropped into Division Two of the North Eastern League as Division One had no spaces. With only two clubs eligible for promotion, Ashington appeared to have missed out after finishing third. However, runners-up White-le-Head declined the opportunity of promotion, allowing Ashington to move up to Division One. Five years later the league was reduced to a single division, where they remained until the league folded in 1958 due to the resignation of the Football League clubs' reserve teams, unsuccessfully applying for election to the Football League in 1947 (when no vote took place) and 1950 (when they received no votes).

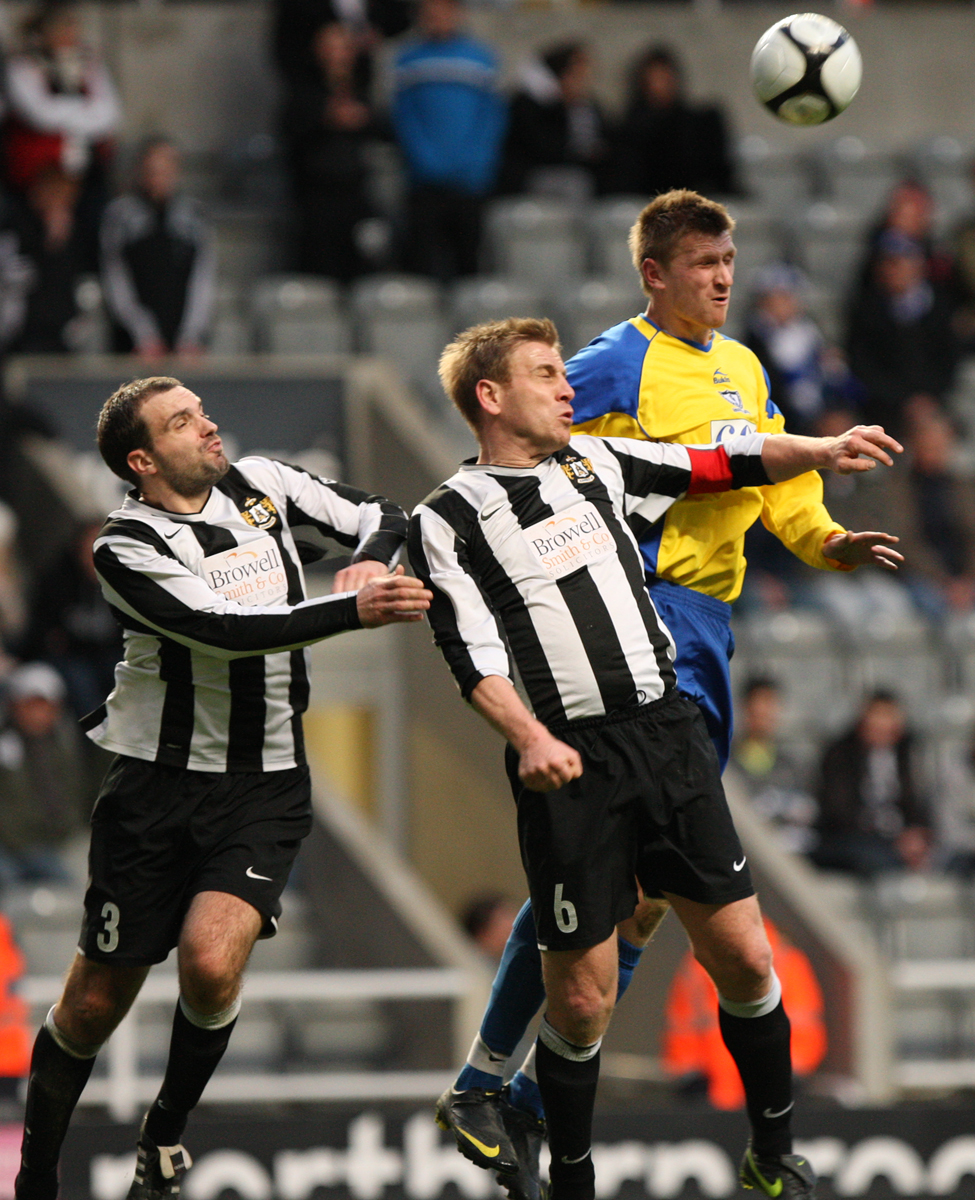
Marc Wamsley (left), Iain Nickalls (centre) and Phil Bell of Whitley Bay (right) contest a ball at the Northumberland Senior Cup 2010 Final at St James' Park.

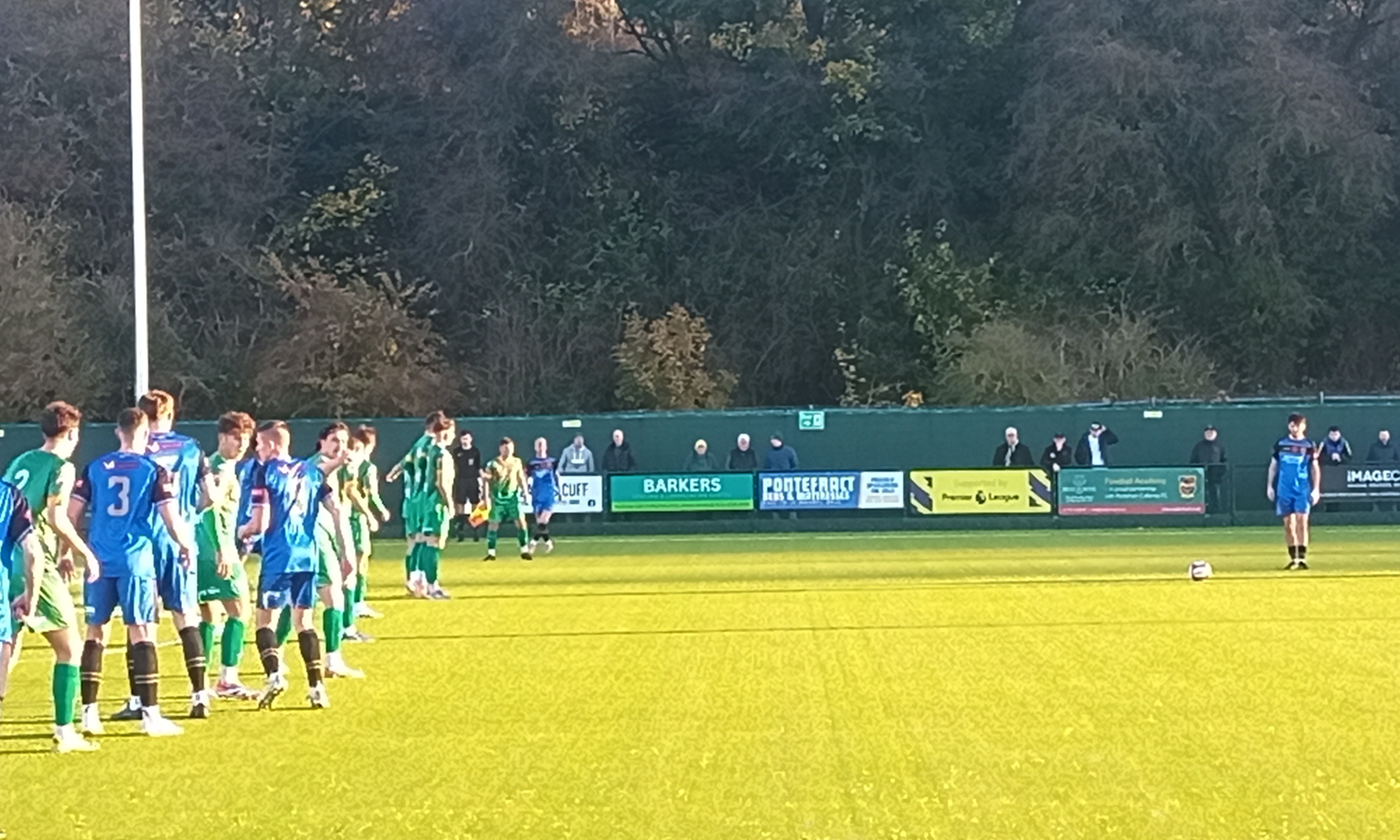
Ashington Town playing Pontefract Collieries in November 2025

Alongside several other former North Eastern League clubs, Ashington switched to the Midland League. In 1960 they were founder members of the Northern Counties League, finishing as runners-up in its first season. The North Eastern League was re-established in 1962, but lasted only two seasons. Ashington spent the 1964–65 season in the Wearside League before joining the North Regional League, which was largely composed of Football League reserve teams. They remained in the league for three seasons, before becoming founder members of the Northern Premier League in 1968. In the first season of the league, the club finished third-from-bottom and resigned due to the costs of being in the league. They spent a single season back in the Northern Alliance, before joining the Northern League in 1970. In 1973–74 they reached the semi-finals of the last-ever FA Amateur Cup, losing 3–0 to eventual winners Bishop's Stortford in a replay.

In 1981 a second division was added to the league, with Ashington remaining in Division One. However, after finishing second-from-bottom in 1983–84 they were relegated to Division Two. In 2000–01 they won Division Two, earning promotion to Division One. However, they spent only a single season in Division One before being relegated back to Division Two. After finishing fifth in 2002–03, they won Division Two again in 2003–04 and were promoted back to Division One. In 2012–13 they won the Northumberland Senior Cup for the tenth time with a 3–0 win over Whitley Bay. The 2022–23 season saw the club finish second in Division One, qualifying for an inter-step play-off. They went on to defeat Glossop North End 3–0 in the match to earn promotion to Division One East of the Northern Premier League.

=== Season-by-season ===
Season	League	Position	Significant events
1892–93	Northern Alliance	11/12	
1895–96	East Northumberland League		
1896–97	East Northumberland League		
1897–98	East Northumberland League	1	Champions
1898–99	East Northumberland League		
1899–1900	East Northumberland League		
1900–01	East Northumberland League		
1901–02	East Northumberland League		
1902–03	Northern Alliance	13/14	
1903–04	Northern Alliance	7/15	
1904–05	Northern Alliance	6/15	
1905–06	Northern Alliance	2/16	
1906–07	Northern Alliance	5/13	
1907–08	Northern Alliance	6/16	
1908–09	Northern Alliance	6/15	
1909–10	Northern Alliance	5/15	
1910–11	Northern Alliance	2/16	
1911–12	Northern Alliance	2/16	
1912–13	Northern Alliance	5/17	
1913–14	Northern Alliance	1/16	Champions
1914–15	North Eastern League	9/20	
1919–20	North Eastern League	7/18	
1920–21	North Eastern League	9/20	Elected to the Football League
1921–22	Football League Third Division North	10/20	
1922–23	Football League Third Division North	19/20	
1923–24	Football League Third Division North	8/22	
1924–25	Football League Third Division North	10/22	
1925–26	Football League Third Division North	9/22	
1926–27	Football League Third Division North	16/22	
1927–28	Football League Third Division North	18/22	
1928–29	Football League Third Division North	22/22	Not re-elected
1929–30	North Eastern League Division Two	3/15	Promoted
1930–31	North Eastern League Division One	18/22	
1931–32	North Eastern League Division One	15/22	
1932–33	North Eastern League Division One	14/20	
1933–34	North Eastern League Division One	13/20	
1934–35	North Eastern League Division One	16/20	League reduced to a single division
1935–36	North Eastern League	18/20	
1936–37	North Eastern League	7/20	
1937–38	North Eastern League	7/20	
1938–39	North Eastern League	7/20	
1947–48	North Eastern League	9/20	
1948–49	North Eastern League	7/20	
1949–50	North Eastern League	15/20	
1950–51	North Eastern League	8/20	
1951–52	North Eastern League	5/18	
1952–53	North Eastern League	10/18	
1953–54	North Eastern League	15/18	
1954–55	North Eastern League	13/18	
1955–56	North Eastern League	3/18	
1956–57	North Eastern League	4/18	
1957–58	North Eastern League	3/18	League folded at end of season
1958–59	Midland League	2/19	
1959–60	Midland League	3/17	Switched to Northern Counties League
1960–61	Northern Counties League	2/10	
1961–62	Northern Counties League	3/13	League renamed North Eastern League
1962–63	North Eastern League	5/12	
1963–64	North Eastern League	3/8	League folded at end of season
1964–65	Wearside League	2/20	
1965–66	North Regional League	6/17	
1966–67	North Regional League	4/11	
1967–68	North Regional League	5/9	
1968–69	Northern Premier League	18/20	Left league
1969–70	Northern Alliance	3/12	
1970–71	Northern League	11/20	
1971–72	Northern League	18/20	
1972–73	Northern League	9/20	
1973–74	Northern League	8/20	
1974–75	Northern League	9/19	
1975–76	Northern League	7/20	
1976–77	Northern League	9/20	
1977–78	Northern League	15/20	
1978–79	Northern League	3/20	
1979–80	Northern League	4/20	
1980–81	Northern League	5/20	
1981–82	Northern League	18/20	
1982–83	Northern League Division One	16/19	
1983–84	Northern League Division One	17/18	Relegated
1984–85	Northern League Division Two	10/18	
1985–86	Northern League Division Two	8/20	
1986–87	Northern League Division Two	10/19	
1987–88	Northern League Division Two	15/18	
1988–89	Northern League Division Two	5/20	
1989–90	Northern League Division Two	13/20	
1990–91	Northern League Division Two	12/19	
1991–92	Northern League Division Two	12/20	
1992–93	Northern League Division Two	8/20	
1993–94	Northern League Division Two	17/19	
1994–95	Northern League Division Two	7/20	
1995–96	Northern League Division Two	6/19	
1996–97	Northern League Division Two	4/19	
1997–98	Northern League Division Two	5/19	
1998–99	Northern League Division Two	11/19	
1999–2000	Northern League Division Two	9/19	
2000–01	Northern League Division Two	1/19	Champions, promoted
2001–02	Northern League Division One	19/21	Relegated
2002–03	Northern League Division Two	5/20	
2003–04	Northern League Division Two	1/20	Champions, promoted
2004–05	Northern League Division One	10/21	
2005–06	Northern League Division One	16/21	
2006–07	Northern League Division One	19/22	
2007–08	Northern League Division One	17/22	
2008–09	Northern League Division One	16/22	
2009–10	Northern League Division One	6/22	
2010–11	Northern League Division One	8/22	
2011–12	Northern League Division One	5/22	
2012–13	Northern League Division One	7/24	
2013–14	Northern League Division One	6/23	
2014–15	Northern League Division One	13/22	
2015–16	Northern League Division One	12/22	
2016–17	Northern League Division One	16/22	
2017–18	Northern League Division One	12/22	
2018–19	Northern League Division One	16/18	
2019–20	Northern League Division One	–	Season abandoned
2020–21	Northern League Division One	–	Season abandoned
2021–22	Northern League Division One	8/20	
2022–23	Northern League Division One	2/20	Promoted by playoff
2023–24	Northern Premier League Division One East	14/20	
2024–25	Northern Premier League Division One East	16/22	
Source: Football Club History Database, Blyth News and Ashington Post, Non-League Matters

== Colours and crest ==
Ashington's colours are black and white vertical stripes, used on the shirt and paired with black shorts and black socks for home matches. While away, they use an all light blue shirt and socks with white shorts.

The Ashington AFC badge has two lions flanking a badge with a stylised AFC logo, with a football between the legs of the A.

== Ground ==
Ashington moved a new ground named Station Road in 1909, which was renamed Portland Park in 1914. They played at Portland Park during their Football League years, with the club's first Football League match attracting a crowd of 9,000. They remained at Portland Park after dropping out of the league, with the club's record attendance of 13,199 coming for an FA Cup second round tie with Rochdale on 9 December 1950.

In 2008 the club left Portland Park to move to Woodhorn Lane. The final match was played at the old ground in February 2008 against Seaham Red Star, attracting a crowd of 1,954. The first game at Woodhorn Lane took place on 30 August 2008 against Ossett Albion, with 341 spectators watching a 2–1 win for Ashington in an FA Cup preliminary round game.

== Honours ==
- Northern League
  - Division Two champions 2000–01, 2003–04
  - Ernest Armstrong Memorial Cup winners 1998–99, 2002–03
  - Division One Cup 2021–22
- Northern Alliance
  - Champions 1913–14
- East Northumberland League
  - Champions 1897–98
- Northumberland Senior Cup
  - Winners 1920–21, 1932–33, 1938–39, 1949–50, 1955–56, 1956–57, 1961–62, 1966–67, 1979–80, 2012–13

== Records ==
- Best FA Amateur Cup performance: Semi-finals, 1973–74
- Best FA Cup performance: Third round, 1926–27
- Best FA Trophy performance: second round 1979–80, 1980–81, 1982–83
- Best FA Vase performance: Fifth round, 2011–12
- Record attendance:
  - At Portland Park: 13,199 vs Rochdale, FA Cup second round, 9 December 1950
  - At Woodhorn Lane: 1,488 vs Blyth Spartans, Northern Premier League Division One East, 26 December 2025

== See also ==
- Ashington A.F.C. players
- Ashington A.F.C. managers
