= Fred Kirby (footballer) =

English footballer

Personal information
- Full name: Frederick Kirby
- Date of birth: 1891
- Place of birth: Bishop Auckland, England
- Position: Forward

Senior career*
Years	Team	Apps	(Gls)
1910–1911	Bishop Auckland		
1911	Sunderland	1	(0)
1911–1912	Bishop Auckland		
1912–1913	Durham City		
1913	Middlesbrough	2	(0)
1913–1914	Bishop Auckland		
1914	Halifax Town		
1914	Bradford Park Avenue	10	(3)
1914	Bishop Auckland		
1919–19??	Halifax Town		
- * Club domestic league appearances and goals

Frederick Kirby (born 1891) was an English amateur footballer who played as a forward for Sunderland.
