= 1952–53 Northern Football League =

The 1952–53 Northern Football League season was the 55th in the history of the Northern Football League, a football competition in Northern England.

== Clubs ==
Northern League
- Season: 1952–53
- Champions: Crook Town
- Matches: 182
- Goals: 807 (4.43 per match)

The league featured 13 clubs which competed in the last season, along with one new club:

- Durham City

=== League table ===
Pos	Team	Pld	W	D	L	GF	GA	GR	Pts
1	Crook Town	26	19	5	2	106	38	2.789	43
2	Bishop Auckland	26	14	9	3	79	38	2.079	37
3	Whitby Town	26	15	5	6	71	45	1.578	35
4	Shildon	26	12	9	5	60	40	1.500	33
5	Tow Law Town	26	13	5	8	56	54	1.037	31
6	Ferryhill Athletic	26	11	7	8	51	43	1.186	29
7	Billingham Synthonia	26	11	6	9	59	56	1.054	28
8	Willington	26	10	6	10	53	57	0.930	26
9	Penrith	26	9	7	10	58	64	0.906	25
10	Evenwood Town	26	6	8	12	50	56	0.893	20
11	Stanley United	26	8	2	16	49	72	0.681	18
12	Durham City	26	7	4	15	41	69	0.594	18
13	West Auckland Town	26	4	5	17	37	72	0.514	13
14	South Bank	26	2	4	20	37	103	0.359	8

Rules for classification: 1) points; 2) goal ratio.

No changes following this season.
