= Bill Harburn =

English-born Australian footballer

Personal information
- Full name: William Nicholson Harburn
- Date of birth: 19 November 1923
- Place of birth: Stockton-on-Tees, England
- Date of death: 15 October 1970 (aged 46)
- Place of death: Melbourne, Australia
- Positions: Centre forward; wing half; full back

Youth career
- South Bank

Senior career*
Years	Team	Apps	(Gls)
- South Bank
1947–1948	Darlington	1	(0)
	South Bank		(0)
1952–1953	Crook Town	12	
- Bishop Auckland
1954	Billingham Synthonia	4	(1)
- Hakoah
- * Club domestic league appearances and goals

William Nicholson Harburn (19 November 1923 – 15 October 1970) was a footballer who played in the Football League for Darlington and in non-league football for several clubs in the north-east of England. After emigrating to Australia, he played for Hakoah in the Victorian State League and was a member of Australia's squad for the 1956 Olympics. He began his career as a centre forward, later played at wing half and finished up at full back.

He was one of 35 workers killed when a section of the West Gate Bridge in Melbourne collapsed while under construction in 1970.

== Life and career ==
Harburn was born in Stockton-on-Tees, County Durham. As a teenager he was a competition swimmer, and played football as a forward with South Bank's youth teams.

He continued to represent South Bank after the war in the Northern League, and scored as they beat Tow Law 3–1 to win the 1948 Northern League Challenge Cup. In the 1947–48 Football League season, he appeared once as an amateur in the Third Division North for Darlington, playing at centre forward in a 2–0 defeat away to Southport on 8 September 1947. Playing as a wing half, Harburn was a member of the Crook Town team that won the 1952–53 Northern League title, and he also played for Bishop Auckland and Billingham Synthonia, for whom he scored twice in six matches during the 1953–54 season.

In the mid-1950s, Harburn, his wife Mavis, and their three young children emigrated to Australia. A fourth child was born some years later. The family settled in Melbourne, where Harburn continued his trade as a boilermaker and played football for Victorian State League club Hakoah. In a game against Juventus in May 1955, The Age's reporter saw a performance that "stamps him as easily the best full-back to play in Victoria". That same year, he played in an Australian XI against a touring South China team. Harburn was selected for the Australian squad for the 1956 Olympics in his home city of Melbourne, but played in neither of their matches. He played for Hakoah until at least 1959, and continued playing recreational football for much longer.

On 15 October 1970, Harburn was working on the construction of the West Gate Bridge in Melbourne when a 2,000-tonne span collapsed, falling onto the mud of the river below. He had changed his job two weeks previously because he wanted to continue working on the bridge rather than in the factory. He and 34 co-workers were killed.
