= East Northumberland League =

- Founded: 1894
- Folded: 1910
- Country: England
- Divisions: 1
- Most championships: Blyth Spartans

The East Northumberland League (ENL) was a football league that existed in Northumberland from 1894 to 1910.

== Overview ==
The ENL was made up of teams chiefly from the mining areas of Northumberland. However, the teams had chronic instability, with no team playing in the league for the full period of the league's existence, and more than half lasting for only a single year or less. At least two champions of the league, Ashington and Blyth Spartans, are still in existence however. Both of these teams went on to join the Northern Football Alliance shortly after their successes in the ENL.

== Champions ==
Season	Champions
1894-95	Choppington
1895-96	Seghill
1896-97	Burradon
1897-98	Ashington
1898-99	Seghill
1899–1900	Morpeth Harriers
1900-01	Ashington
1901-02	New Delaval
1902-03	New Delaval
1903-04	Blyth Spartans
1904-05	Bedlington United
1905-06	Blyth Spartans
1906-07	Blyth Spartans
1907-08	Bedlington United
1908-09	Choppington St Pauls
1909-10	Amble
