= Durham City A.F.C. =

English football club

Coordinates: 54.708650°N 1.6908807°W

Durham City
- Full name: Durham City Association Football Club
- Nickname: The Citizens
- Founded: 1918
- Ground: Leyburn Grove, Houghton-le-Spring
- Chairman: Gary Hutchinson
- League: Wearside League Division One
- 2025–26: Wearside League Division One, 13th of 13
Home colours	Away colours

Durham City Association Football Club is a football club based in Durham, England. Members of the Football League from 1921 until 1928, they currently play in the Wearside League Division One.

== History ==
The club was established in 1918 and initially competed in the Victory League, which was set up in celebration of the end of World War I, finishing bottom of the table. In 1919 they joined the North Eastern League, finishing fifth in their first season. Despite a mid-table finish in 1920–21, they were one of fourteen clubs automatically elected to the newly formed Third Division North of the Football League in 1921. They finished bottom of the division in 1922–23, but were re-elected. In 1925–26 the club reached the second round of the FA Cup for the first time, losing 3–0 at home to Division Three North rivals Southport. After finishing second-from-bottom in 1927–28, the club failed to win re-election, gaining only 11 votes to the 22 received by the newly elected Carlisle United.

Durham dropped back into Division One of the North Eastern League, replacing their reserve team. They finished bottom of Division One in 1928–29 and were relegated to Division Two. However, after finishing as Division Two runners-up in 1930–31, they were promoted back to Division One. In 1933 the club was renamed City of Durham. After three consecutive finishes in the bottom three between 1934–35 and 1936–37, they ended the 1937–38 season bottom of the league. They dropped into the Wearside League, but folded in November 1938, partly due to the introduction of greyhound racing at their Holiday Park ground.

The club was re-established in 1949, and joined the Wearside League for the 1950–51 season. After two seasons they were admitted to the Northern League. The club finished bottom of the league in 1954–55, but the following season saw them reach the first round of the FA Cup for the first time as a non-League club, eventually losing 3–1 at local rivals Bishop Auckland. In 1957–58 they went one better, reaching the second round, where they lost 3–0 at home to Tranmere Rovers in front of Ferens Park's record crowd. The club finished bottom of the Northern League again in 1960–61, 1963–64 and 1965–66, but were runners-up in 1970–71. After the league gained a second division in 1982, they were relegated to Division Two at the end of the 1983–84 season. However, a third-place finish in 1987–88 saw them promoted back to Division One.

After three seasons in Division One, Durham were relegated back to Division Two at the end of the 1990–91 season, which had seen them finish bottom of the table. However, they were runners-up in Division Two the following season, and were promoted back to Division One. They went on to win their first league title in 1993–94, also winning the league's Cleator Cup. Although the club were relegated at the end of the 1997–98 season, they won Division Two the following season to make an immediate return to Division One. They won the League Cup and the Cleator Cup in 2001–02 and finished as Division One runners-up in 2003–04. After winning the league for a second time and the Cleator Cup for a third time in 2007–08, they were promoted to Division One North of the Northern Premier League.

Durham's first season in the Northern Premier League saw them win Division One North, earning promotion to the Premier Division; they also won the league's Chairman's Cup. However, their main sponsor withdrew in the summer of 2009 after the Football Conference ruled that they would not accept clubs with artificial pitches, which Durham had. As a result, the club lost most of its players and won only two league matches during the 2009–10 season. They finished bottom of the table with zero points after having six points deducted for playing a player under a false name, and were relegated back to Division One North. Although they managed to finish in mid-table in the following two seasons, they resigned from the league at the end of the 2011–12 season and returned to Division One of the Northern League. In 2013 the club was purchased by former Premier League player Olivier Bernard, with a stated aim of making them a talent development club for local professional teams. After finishing in the bottom three in 2015–16, the club were relegated to Division Two.

Durham continued to struggle, winning only one game in four years between April 2019 to May 2023, resulting in them being labelled "England's worst football club". The 2019–20 and 2020–21 seasons were not completed due to the COVID-19 pandemic, and club avoided relegation. However, in 2021–22 they finished bottom of Division Two and were relegated to Division One of the Wearside League. The following season saw them finish bottom of Division One, resulting in relegation to the second tier of the Wearside League (renamed Division One for the 2023–24 season).

=== Season-by-season record ===
Season	Division	Position	Significant events
1918–19	Victory League	8/8	
1919–20	North Eastern League	5/18	
1920–21	North Eastern League	12/20	Elected to the Football League
1921–22	Third Division North	11/20	
1922–23	Third Division North	20/20	
1923–24	Third Division North	15/22	
1924–25	Third Division North	13/22	
1925–26	Third Division North	13/22	
1926–27	Third Division North	20/22	
1927–28	Third Division North	21/22	Not re-elected
1928–29	North Eastern League Division One	20/20	Relegated
1929–30	North Eastern League Division Two	7/15	
1930–31	North Eastern League Division Two	2/14	Promoted
1931–32	North Eastern League Division One	18/22	
1932–33	North Eastern League Division One	17/20	
1933–34	North Eastern League Division One	16/20	
1934–35	North Eastern League Division One	18/20	League reduced to a single division
1935–36	North Eastern League	19/20	
1936–37	North Eastern League	18/20	
1937–38	North Eastern League	20/20	Left league
1938–39	Wearside League	Withdrew	Club folded
1950–51	Wearside League	5/16	
1951–52	Wearside League	8/16	Moved up to Northern League
1952–53	Northern League	12/14	
1953–54	Northern League	6/14	
1954–55	Northern League	14/14	
1955–56	Northern League	3/14	
1956–57	Northern League	7/14	
1957–58	Northern League	6/14	
1958–59	Northern League	4/15	
1959–60	Northern League	14/15	
1960–61	Northern League	16/16	
1961–62	Northern League	8/16	
1962–63	Northern League	11/16	
1963–64	Northern League	16/16	
1964–65	Northern League	14/18	
1965–66	Northern League	18/18	
1966–67	Northern League	17/18	
1967–68	Northern League	7/18	
1968–69	Northern League	13/18	
1969–70	Northern League	5/18	
1970–71	Northern League	2/20	
1971–72	Northern League	4/20	
1972–73	Northern League	10/20	
1973–74	Northern League	10/20	
1974–75	Northern League	7/19	
1975–76	Northern League	13/20	
1976–77	Northern League	12/20	
1977–78	Northern League	8/20	
1978–79	Northern League	10/20	
1979–80	Northern League	18/20	
1980–81	Northern League	17/20	
1981–82	Northern League	8/20	
1982–83	Northern League Division One	17/19	Relegated
1983–84	Northern League Division Two	5/18	
1984–85	Northern League Division Two	5/18	
1985–86	Northern League Division Two	4/20	
1986–87	Northern League Division Two	12/19	
1987–88	Northern League Division Two	3/18	Promoted
1988–89	Northern League Division One	14/20	
1989–90	Northern League Division One	17/20	
1990–91	Northern League Division One	20/20	Relegated
1991–92	Northern League Division Two	2/20	Promoted
1992–93	Northern League Division One	6/20	
1993–94	Northern League Division One	1/20	Champions
1994–95	Northern League Division One	7/20	
1995–96	Northern League Division One	3/20	
1996–97	Northern League Division One	4/20	
1997–98	Northern League Division One	18/20	Relegated
1998–99	Northern League Division Two	1/19	Champions, promoted
1999–00	Northern League Division One	15/20	
2000–01	Northern League Division One	4/21	
2001–02	Northern League Division One	6/21	
2002–03	Northern League Division One	5/21	
2003–04	Northern League Division One	2/21	
2004–05	Northern League Division One	6/21	
2005–06	Northern League Division One	11/21	
2006–07	Northern League Division One	8/22	
2007–08	Northern League Division One	1/22	Champions, promoted
2008–09	Northern Premier League Division One North	1/21	Champions, promoted
2009–10	Northern Premier League Premier Division	20/20	Relegated
2010–11	Northern Premier League Division One North	17/23	
2011–12	Northern Premier League Division One North	9/22	Resigned
2012–13	Northern League Division One	14/24	
2013–14	Northern League Division One	9/23	
2014–15	Northern League Division One	12/22	
2015–16	Northern League Division One	20/22	Relegated
2016–17	Northern League Division Two	10/21	
2017–18	Northern League Division Two	11/21	
2018–19	Northern League Division Two	20/20	
2019–20	Northern League Division Two	Season unfinished due to COVID-19 pandemic	
2020–21	Northern League Division Two	Season unfinished due to COVID-19 pandemic	
2021–22	Northern League Division Two	21/21	Relegated
2022–23	Wearside League Premier Division	17/17	Relegated
2023–24	Wearside League Division One	9/14	
2024–25	Wearside League Division One	7/18	
2025–26	Wearside League Division One	13/13	

== Ground ==
The club initially played at Garden House Park before moving to Kepier Haughs in 1920. Due to its distance from the city centre, the club relocated to Holiday Park in 1923.

After being reformed, the club played at Ferens Park until the end of the 1993–94 season. During the 1994–95 season they played at Chester-le-Street Town's Moor Park, before moving to New Ferens Park in 1995. The ground has a capacity of 2,700, of which 270 is seated and 750 covered. An artificial pitch was installed in 2006. However, a dispute with the landlord led to the club moving to Consett's Belle View Stadium in 2015, where they played until the end of the 2016–17 season. They then moved to Willington's Hall Lane ground prior to the 2017–18 season. In 2022 the club relocated to Leyburn Grove in Houghton-le-Spring.

== Honours ==
- Northern Premier League
  - Division One North champions 2008–09
  - Chairman's Cup winners 2008–09
- Northern League
  - Division One champions 1993–94, 2007–08
  - Division Two champions 1998–99
  - League Cup winners 2001–02
  - Cleator Cup winners 1994–95, 2001–02, 2008–09
- Durham Challenge Cup
  - Winners 1971–72
- Durham FA Benevolent Bowl
  - Winners 1955–56

== Records ==
- Best FA Cup performance: Second round, 1925–26, 1957–58
- Best FA Trophy performance: Second round, 2008–09
- Best FA Vase performance: Semi-finals, 2001–02
- Record attendance: 7,886 vs Darlington, FA Cup fifth qualifying round, 3 December 1921
  - At Holiday Park: 7,182 vs West Stanley, FA Cup, 17 September 1923
  - At Ferens Park: 7,000 vs Tranmere Rovers, FA Cup second round, 7 November 1957

== See also ==
- Durham City A.F.C. players
- Durham City A.F.C. managers
