= Thornaby F.C. =

Association football club in England

Thornaby Football Club
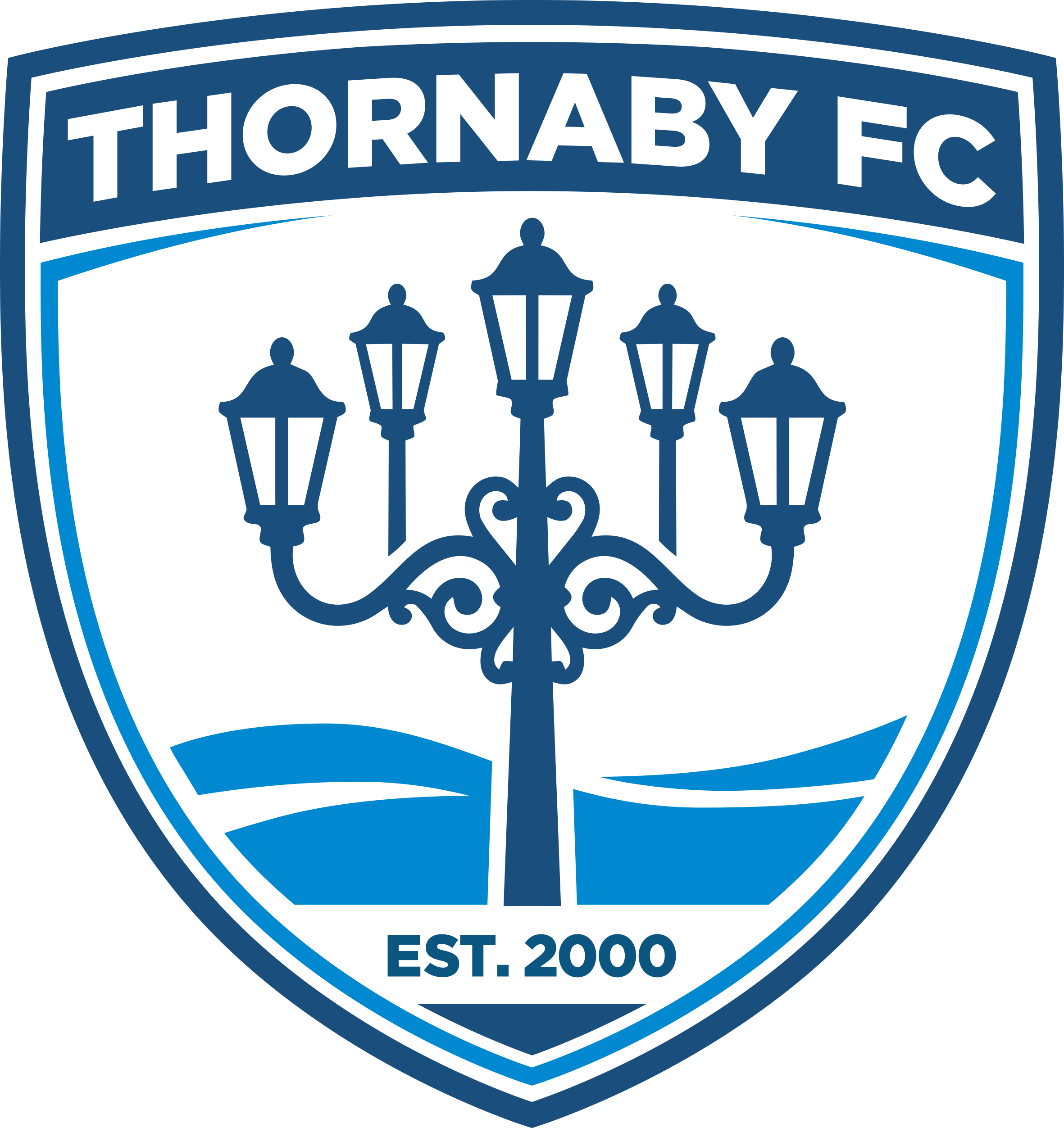
- Full name: Thornaby Football Club
- Nickname: The Blue Lamps
- Founded: 2000; 26 years ago
- Ground: Teesdale Park
- Capacity: 5,000
- Coordinates: 54°33′10″N 1°16′55″W
- Chief Executive: Alison McGee
- Management Staff: Craig Skelton & Simon Kasonali (Men's Team) Curtis Collantine (Women's Team)
- League: Northern League Division One
- 2025–26: Northern League Division One, 14th of 19
Home colours

Thornaby Football Club are a football club based in Thornaby-on-Tees, North Yorkshire, England who play in the Northern League Division One, the ninth tier of the English football league system. Thornaby have played all their games at Teesdale Park throughout their history and wear blue shirts at home.

== History ==
The club was established in 1980 when Stockton Cricket Club's football team joined the Wearside Football League. The club were known as Stockton until 2000.

In 2005–06, they finished 17th out of 21 in the Northern League Division One, but were demoted to Northern League Division Two due to the poor quality of their ground. Their ground, Teesdale Park, was formally Head Wrightson athletic ground and was a cricket field.

Manager Ray Morton was appointed in season 2008–09. They finished 20th in season 2008–09 and reached the quarter-finals of the Ernest Armstrong Second Division Cup being beaten by eventual finalists Sunderland RCA. In season 2009–10 they reached the final of the Ernest Armstrong 2nd division cup being beaten 3–1 in extra time by Whitehaven A.F.C. having played all the second half and extra time with 10 players due to a sending off after 47 mins. In season 2010–11 they finished 14th. In June 2012 they appointed Neil Radigan as manager for season 2012–13 initially with Ray Morton as assistant but he was replaced with Paul Edwards in September 2012, and they finished 19th and also the same position in season 2013–14. In May 2014 they appointed Paul Edwards as manager who had been assistant to Neil Radigan since 2012 with Mark Horkan as assistant, they finished season 2014–15 in 7th position the highest for several years.

The ground has seen widespread development – security fencing has been erected and the Teesdale Park site now has a teen shelter, fitness trail, nature trail and some wooden owl statues funded from a National Lottery Community spaces lottery grant to enable the site to be developed for the community. The Football club have also been given funding for a new community room by the Stockton council run Eastern area partnership board, the ground has hosted a forest school on the Park for local schools and groups and a recent grant from the FA has seen the changing rooms and floodlights upgraded to high standards. The club were awarded the Northern league hospitality award in 2014.

In season 2015–16 they finished 7th in Division 2 and reached the semi-finals of the North Riding Cup being defeated by Middlesbrough FC the winners. In season 2016–17 manager Paul Edwards resigned in late August, with his assistant Mark Harkin taking over. He resigned in mid-October 2016 and was replaced by experienced manager Paul Burton who left in July 2017.

Thornaby ended the 2018–19 season as runners-up in division two with 91 points, and were therefore promoted to division one. After the two covid-disrupted seasons, Thornaby finished third in division one in 2021–22, but the following season saw them relegated back to division two after finishing in 20th place out of 20 in division one. On the morning of 26 June 2023, the club were victims of a suspected arson attack at Teesdale Park, which destroyed the main clubhouse and most of the club's ground maintenance equipment.

In June 2024, the committee of Thornaby FC led by Trevor Wing voted to remove the entire female section of the club, ranging from under 7s to the women's team. The club lost their shirt sponsor, Britcab, just hours after the announcement. The club's chair, Garry Morris, posted on X to say that he disagreed with the decision, asking other members of the board to reconsider their decision and their position as board members. People expressing support for the Thornaby women included politician Andy McDonald, footballer Beth Mead and life peeress and Olympic wheelchair athlete Tanni Grey-Thompson. Six members of the board who had supported the decision resigned on 10 June. The decision was reversed on 13 June, with Alison McGee of the club's sponsor Durata being named CE, Garry Morris as Chairman and McGee's husband John McGee as managing director. In July 2024, Former Middlesbrough forward Andy Campbell was brought in as Director of Football working across both teams at the club.

Following a solid start to the 2024/25 Northern League Division Two campaign, manager Deano Browne was sacked and replaced by Bobby Coltman and his assistant Shane Gavin, who led the club to promotion via the playoffs. In July 2025, Ryan McKnight was appointed as Chief Operating Officer.

Following a slow start to the 2025/2026 campaign, manager Bobby Coltman left his role, being replaced by duo Craig Skelton and Simon Kasonali, who guided the side to safety and a 14th place finish on their return to the Northern League Division One.

== Ownership ==
As of March 2026, the club is registered as a community amateur sports club (CASC).

== Rebrand ==
In March 2026, the club announced via social media their plans to update their badge and invited stakeholders to share their thoughts via a consultation. In April 2026 at the club's end of season event, the badge was unveiled for the first time.

The new badge features a more modern and streamlined design, with heavy inspiration from local iconography and the local landmark 'The Five Lamps' as a core part of the design.

At the end of April, following the conclusion of both men and women's team league campaigns, Thornaby FC officially rolled out their new badge across all digital platforms.

The rebrand also saw the club take on a new nickname in the form of 'The Blue Lamps' taken directly from the new crest. The rebrand also saw the elimination of yellow and red from the club's colours.

== Women's and girls' football ==
The club established its first women's teams in the summer of 2021. The Women's first team has competed in the North Riding Women's Football League, Premier Division and in the North East Regional Women's Football League Northern Division. Home fixtures are also played at Teesdale Park. Their U16 girls competed in the Russell Foster Premier Division, winning the league shield and North Riding County Cup in their first season. As of June 2024 there were girls' teams for Under 7, Under 8, Under 10, Under 11 and Under 15, with 100 girls and women playing. In June 2024, the committee of Thornaby FC led by Trevor Wing voted to remove the entire female section of the club, ranging from under 7s to the women's team. The club lost their shirt sponsor, Britcab, just hours after the announcement. The club's chair, Garry Morris, posted on X to say that he disagreed with the decision, asking other members of the board to reconsider their decision and their position as board members. People expressing support for the Thornaby women included politician Andy McDonald, footballer Beth Mead and life peeress and Olympic wheelchair athlete Tanni Grey-Thompson. Six members of the board who had supported the decision resigned on 10 June. The decision was reversed on 13 June, with Alison McGee of the club's sponsor Durata being named CEO, Garry Morris as managing director and Philip Genery, Rachel Stonehouse, and McGee's husband John McGee as board members. In July 2024, Former Middlesbrough forward Andy Campbell was brought in as Director of Football working across both teams at the club.

The 2024–25 the women's team went on to win the league.

Manager Claire Streeter, who guided the team to promotion, left the club in October 2025. After months of searching, Curtis Collantine was appointed as Women's First Team Manager. Curtis guided Thornaby Women to a 16 game winning streak, guaranteeing promotion to the FA Women's National League North Division One.

Further controversy followed in April 2026 when it was announced by the North Riding County FA that the women's County Cup Final was to be played at a different venue to the men's. Thornaby FC campaigned this attracting attention across social media. In May 2026 the decision was overturned and final scheduled to be played at the Riverside Stadium.

== Honours ==
Thornaby F.C.'s honours
Competition		Position	Season
Northern League	Division Two	Champions	1987-88, 1991-92
Northern League	Ernest Armstrong Cup	Runners-up	2009-10

== Records ==
=== Stockton FC ===
- Best FA Cup performance: 3rd round, 1951–52
- Best FA Trophy performance: 1st round, 1970–71 (replay), 1971–72, 1988–89
- Best FA Vase performance: 3rd round, 1997–98
- Best FA Amateur Cup performance: Winners, 1898–99, 1902–03 (replay), 1911–12 (replay)

=== Thornaby-on-Tees FC ===
- Best FA Cup performance: 1st qualifying round, 1999–00
- Best FA Vase performance: 1st round, 1999–00

=== Thornaby FC ===
- Best FA Cup performance: 3rd qualifying round, 2005–06
- Best FA Vase performance: 2nd round, 2001–02, 2002–03 (replay), 2005–06, 2017–18, 2019–20, 2021–22, 2022–23
- Best FA Amateur Cup performance: Semi-finals, 1896–97
