= Wearside Football League =

Association football league in England

- Organising body: (County Durham) Durham County Football Association (North Riding of Yorkshire) North Riding County Football Association
- Founded: 1892
- Country: England
- Divisions: 4
- Number of clubs: 64
- Level on pyramid: Level 11 (Premier Division)
- Feeder to: Northern League
- Promotion to: Northern League Division Two
- League cup(s): Monkwearmouth Charity Cup; Shipowners' Charity Cup; League Challenge Cup
- Current champions: Durham United (2024–25)
- Website: official

The Wearside Football League is a non-league football competition based in northern England. It consists of four divisions, the uppermost of which sits at step 7 of the National League System (level 11 of the Football pyramid) and is a feeder to the Northern League Division Two.

Founded in 1892, the Wearside League's level has fluctuated in its history, though it has typically sat below the Northern League. The league's high point was probably during the 1960s and 70s after several teams from the defunct North Eastern League joined it; Wearside League teams won the FA Vase in 1978 and 1981. With the restructuring of the National League System in the early 2000s its place at step 7 became fully established, helped by a merger with the Durham Alliance Combination League in 2017. The league has expanded and contracted its number of divisions over the years, and as of 2021-22 consists of three divisions.

Although centred on Wearside and County Durham, the league has contained teams from Tyneside as well, with some geographical overlap with the Northern Football Alliance at the leagues' borders. Teams from Northern Cumbria and North Yorkshire also compete in the league. The league also operates three cup competitions: the Monkwearmouth Charity Cup and the Shipowners' Charity Cup, both of which have been contested since the 1890s, and the League Challenge Cup, which came into being in the 1930s.

== History ==
The Wearside League came into being in 1892 at the instigation of Charles Kirtley, secretary of Sunderland Swifts. In June 1892, a letter written by Kirtley was published in the Sunderland Daily Post and The Herald in which he stated that he had been asked by several club secretaries about the possibility of forming an organisation to play home-and-home matches, so as to find out which was the best amateur team. A similar letter was published in the Sunderland Daily Echo. At a meeting soon afterwards at the Central Coffee Tavern, eleven clubs agreed to form a league, which commenced playing later that year.

During the early years of the league most teams were extremely hard-up, and the league's archive records that one early club had no pitch but instead played on the sands by Sunderland Docks, and another had to play with an old rugby ball as they could not afford an association football ball. By the 20th century, however, the league was better off and was even able to organise matches to benefit local charities during World War I. After the Great War, the league was dominated for many years by colliery welfare teams – in the 1930s every league title was won by a pit team and the mining clubs continued to dominate right through to the 1970s, although an increasing number began to experience financial difficulties from the 1950s onwards due to shrinking workforces at the mines.

In 1964 the North Eastern League was disbanded and a number of its former teams joined the Wearside League. Around this time the team of the 24th Signal Regiment spent one season in the league but then had to withdraw as most of their players were posted overseas. In 1978 Blue Star became the first Wearside League club to reach the final of the FA Vase, and went on to win the trophy, the start of a run of success which would ultimately see them progress much higher up the non-league ranks. Three years later Whickham repeated the feat and also soon moved up to higher leagues. More recently, clubs such as Darlington Railway Athletic, North Shields, Newton Aycliffe, Ryhope Colliery Welfare and Willington have successfully moved up to the Northern League.

== Member clubs for 2026–27 season ==
Premier Division

- Annfield Plain
- Barnard Castle
- Belmont United
- Brandon United
- Durham Corinthians
- Easington Lane
- Esh Winning & Deerness Valley
- Ferryhill Athletic
- Gateshead Leam Rangers
- Hartlepool Pools Youth
- Richmond Town
- Shotton Colliery
- Silksworth Colliery Welfare
- South Moor
- Washington
- West Auckland Reserves
- Willington
- Windscale

First Division

- Consett Blackfyne
- Coxhoe Athletic
- Darlington U23
- Darlington Railway Athletic Reserves
- Durham City
- Easington Lane Reserves
- FC Hartlepool Reserves
- Gateshead Leam Rangers Reserves
- Hilda Park
- Jarrow Reserves
- Middlestone Moor
- Shildon Railway
- Wolviston
- Wynyard Village

Second Division

- Billingham Synthonia Reserves
- Boldon Community Association Reserves
- Consett Reserves
- Crook Town Youth
- Durham Corinthians Development
- Esh Winning & Deerness Valley Reserves
- Ferryhill Town Youth
- Gateshead Kurdish
- Newton Aycliffe YFC
- Peterlee Town
- South Moor Reserves
- Spennymoor Town Youth
- Sunderland Albion
- Sunderland RCA Reserves
- Washington Athletic
- Washington Reserves
- Wingate

Third Division

- Billingham United
- Brandon Community Youth
- Chester-le-Street United
- Deerness Valley Reserves
- Durham County Colts
- Durham United Youth
- East Durham Reds
- Gateshead Fell
- Hartlepool St. Francis
- Heighington
- New Durham
- Shotton Colliery Reserves
- South Tyneside
- Tees Reserves
- Waldridge Park
- Wearside
- Whitburn & Cleadon

== Past champions ==
This is a list of champions since World War II.

Season	Champions
1945–46	Birtley Town
1946–47	Seaham Colliery Welfare
1947–48	Easington Colliery Welfare
1948–49	Easington Colliery Welfare
1949–50	South Hetton
1950–51	Sunderland 'A'
1951–52	Sunderland 'A'
1952–53	Boldon Community Association
1953–54	Shotton Colliery Welfare
1954–55	Boldon Community Association
1955–56	Shotton Colliery Welfare
1956–57	Shotton Colliery Welfare
1957–58	Silksworth Colliery Welfare
1958–59	Langley Park Colliery Welfare
1959–60	Murton Colliery Welfare
1960–61	Shotton Colliery Welfare
1961–62	Ryhope Colliery Welfare
1962–63	Ryhope Colliery Welfare
1963–64	Ryhope Colliery Welfare
1964–65	Horden Colliery Welfare
1965–66	Ryhope Colliery Welfare
1966–67	Reyrolle
1967–68	Horden Colliery Welfare
1968–69	Darlington Reserves
1969–70	Horden Colliery Welfare
1970–71	Horden Colliery Welfare
1971–72	Horden Colliery Welfare
1972–73	Horden Colliery Welfare
1973–74	Blue Star Welfare
1974–75	Boldon Community Association
1975–76	Blue Star Welfare
1976–77	South Shields
1977–78	Whickham
1978–79	Wallsend Town
1979–80	Hartlepool United Reserves
1980–81	Chester-le-Street Town
1981–82	Seaham Colliery Welfare Red Star
1982–83	Blue Star
1983–84	Blue Star
1984–85	Blue Star
1985–86	Coundon TT
1986–87	Annfield Plain
1987–88	Whickham
1988–89	Dunston Federation Brewery
1989–90	Dunston Federation Brewery
1990–91	Eppleton Colliery Welfare
1991–92	Eppleton Colliery Welfare
1992–93	South Shields
1993–94	Hartlepool Town
1994–95	South Shields
1995–96	Marske United
1996–97	Boldon Community Association
1997–98	Annfield Plain
1998–99	North Shields Athletic
1999–2000	Nissan
2000–01	Nissan
2001–02	North Shields
2002–03	Birtley Town
2003–04	North Shields
2004–05	Darlington Railway Athletic
2005–06	Whitehaven
2006–07	Birtley Town
2007–08	New Marske Sports Club
2008–09	Newton Aycliffe
2009–10	Scarborough Town
2010–11	Ryhope Colliery Welfare
2011–12	Ryhope Colliery Welfare
2012–13	Stockton Town
2013–14	Stockton Town
2014–15	Stockton Town
2015–16	Stockton Town
2016–17	Jarrow
2017–18	Redcar Athletic
2018-19	Hebburn Town Reserves
2019-20	Season expunged due to COVID-19 pandemic
2020-21	Boldon Community Association
2021-22	Darlington Town
2022-23	FC Hartlepool
2023-24	Darlington Town
2024–25	Durham United
2025-26	Seaton Carew
