= Blyth Spartans A.F.C. =

Association football club in England

Coordinates: 55°07′15″N 1°30′40″W

- Full name: Blyth Spartans Association Football Club
- Nicknames: The Spartans; Green Army
- Founded: September 1899; 127 years ago
- Ground: Croft Park
- Capacity: 4,130
- Chairman: Kevin Miles
- Manager: Marc Nash
- League: Northern Premier League Division One East
- 2025–26: Northern Premier League Division One East, 16th of 22
- Website: blythspartans.com
Home colours	Away colours

Blyth Spartans Association Football Club is an association football club based in Blyth, Northumberland. They are currently members of Northern Premier League Division One East and play at Croft Park.

They were founded in September 1899 by Fred Stoker, who was the club's first secretary before forming a practice as a distinguished physician in London's Harley Street. He thought it appropriate to name the team after the Greek Spartan army in the hope that the players would give their all as they went into 'battle' on the field of play. The club is most notable for its 1977–78 FA Cup campaign, in which they reached the fifth round, eventually losing to Wrexham in a replay at St James' Park.

== History ==
=== Early history ===
In the beginning, the club played only friendly matches before joining the East Northumberland League in 1901. The first recorded honour was a league success in 1901 followed by further victories in 1905–06 and 1906–07. The club then joined the Northern Football Alliance, remaining there for six seasons winning the league in 1908–09 and 1912–13.

In 1913 the club moved upward joining the ranks of the semi-professionals in the North Eastern League and remained there until this league folded in 1958. The fierce competition meant that honours were few and far between. However they won the league in the 1936–37 season and the league cup in 1950 and again in 1955. After the demise of the North Eastern League the club tried their luck in the Midland League and Northern Counties League, both ending when the leagues folded. The early 1960s saw the revival of the North Eastern League with the club doing quite well. However the league suffered many problems and eventually folded for good.

The club was now at a loss for a suitable semi-professional league and in 1964 decided to turn amateur and join the ranks of the Northern League. During the 29 years the club were members their record was second to none, winning the Championship on 10 occasions and being runners up 5 times. Blyth reached the fifth round of the FA Cup in 1977–78. Having beaten Chesterfield and another non-league side, Enfield F.C., in the second and third rounds respectively, they managed to beat Stoke City (who had recently been relegated from the top flight) in the fourth round. The club were then drawn to play away at Wrexham (whose victory over Newcastle United denied Spartans a tie against their North East neighbours) where they drew 1–1. Blyth would have won the tie but for an unusual sequence when referee Alf Grey ordered a Wrexham corner retaken owing to a technical infringement, enabling Dixie McNeil to score a very late equaliser for the Welsh club. The replay took place at Newcastle United's St James' Park where, watched by a crowd of 42,167, Blyth eventually went out, losing 2–1, meaning they missed out on a home tie with Arsenal.

The 1977–78 FA Cup run qualified Blyth to compete for the 1978 Debenhams Cup, a two-legged tie played between the two teams from outside the top two divisions of the English football pyramid who had progressed furthest in the FA Cup. Blyth again faced Wrexham and triumphed tie 3–2 on aggregate, having first won 2–1 away in Wales and drawing 1–1 at home in the return fixture. The match at Croft Park was the final game ever played in the short-lived existence of the Debenhams Cup and Blyth therefore remain current holders of the cup. The trophy was returned to Croft Park in 2019 having been lost at Debenhams head offices for 41 years. In 1980, Blyth played Hull City in the second round which saw two replays, the latter of which was played at Leeds United's Elland Road. A new regime at the club were keen to progress up the league pyramid and a successful push ended with promotion to the Northern Premier League in the 1993–94 season.

=== Rise up the pyramid ===
Blyth's next memorable cup run came in their first season as a Northern Premier League Premier Division club in 1995–96, when they travelled to high flying Division Three side Bury and won 2–0. In the second round, Blyth again were on their travels this time to Division Two side Stockport County where they lost 2–0. The club's first season in the Northern Premier League was memorable, winning the First Division Championship and the Unifilla First Division League Cup. Since gaining promotion the club has held its own in the Premier division, finishing 6th and 7th in its first two seasons as well as lifting the President's Cup defeating former Conference side Runcorn in the final. In 1997–98, under the managership of John Burridge, Blyth travelled to Second Division side Blackpool. A memorable first round proper game saw Blackpool run out 4–3 winners with a last-minute winner.

=== 21st century ===
Following this success the executive looked firstly to John Charlton (son of Jack Charlton) followed by Paul Baker as team managers but they were unable to continue this success.

==== Harry Dunn's success and the Conference North ====
Harry Dunn was appointed as manager for the second time in October 2004. In 2005–06 Dunn and his assistant Graham Fenton led the Spartans to win the Northern Premier League Premier Division as well as the Northern Premier League Chairman's Cup and the Peter Swailes Memorial Shield, and with it promotion to the Conference North.

In their first season in the Conference North, Blyth cemented themselves in the top half of the table whilst even enjoying a brief stint in 1st place. The season ended with Blyth narrowly missing out on a playoff position on the final day finishing 7th.

However the next season, Blyth found themselves at the opposite end of the table although some wins towards the end of the season (including a 2–0 win against future Champions, Kettering Town) saw Blyth preserve their Conference North status. The third season was a similar story with Blyth struggling for much of the season but wins towards the end of the season again avoided relegation.

It was 11 years before Blyth reached the 1st round again, but finally in 2008–09 they hit the cup trail again. Qualifying round wins against Whitby Town, Buxton and Sheffield FC saw Blyth reach the first round for the first time since 1997. A home tie against League Two promotion chasers Shrewsbury Town saw Croft Park host League opposition for the first time since 1981. The result matched the occasion as Blyth ran out comfortable 3–1 winners.

The second round saw Blyth travel to League Two strugglers AFC Bournemouth, who included Darren Anderton amongst their players. A hard-fought 0–0 draw on the south coast saw Blyth take Bournemouth back to Croft Park, where Ged Dalton put them through to the third round with a last-minute winner. Both games were shown live on Setanta Sports.

In the third round, Blyth played Premier League opposition competitively for the first time in their history when they welcomed Blackburn Rovers to Croft Park. In a game again covered live by Setanta Sports, Blyth fell to a 1–0 defeat with the only goal coming via a direct free kick from Chilean player of the year Carlos Villanueva in the 59th minute. A win would have ensured a tie with North East neighbours Sunderland at the Stadium of Light. After two successful campaigns to preserve Conference North status, the 2008–09 season saw the end of Harry Dunn's second spell at Croft Park. On 9 May former Hartlepool United, Darlington & Sheffield United Reserves Manager Mick Tait took up the post for his second spell in charge at Croft Park.

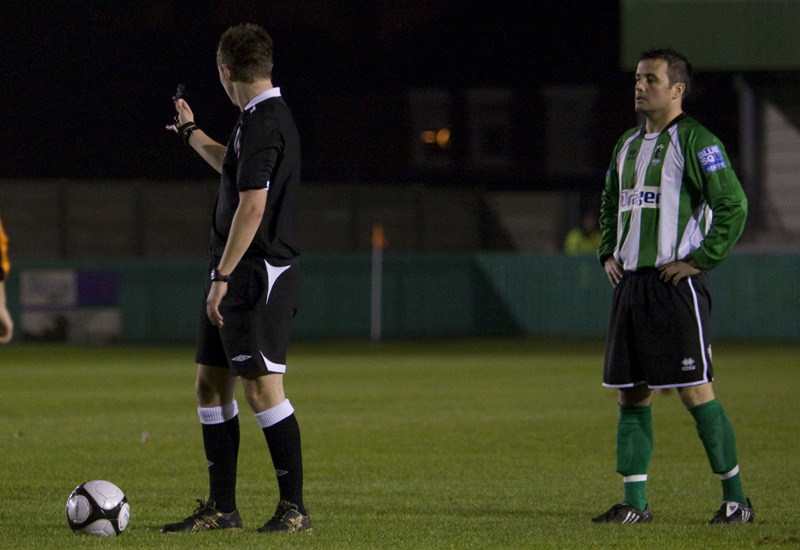
Paul Brayson lines up a free kick for Blyth

==== Relegation and decline ====
It was announced in May 2011 that then Whitley Bay assistant manager Steve Cuggy would take over as manager. He along with his assistant Gavin Fell made a complete overhaul of the squad that summer, letting popular players such as Robbie Dale leave. After initial excitement following a good pre-season, the performances on the pitch were very poor. However Blyth reached the FA Cup 1st round after defeating Droylsden 2–1 at home in the 4th qualifying round replay before losing 2–0 to rivals Gateshead. Following defeat by FC Halifax Town Steve Cuggy left the club in December. Later that month, former Newcastle United player Tommy Cassidy took charge but the poor performances continued. Finally, on 24 March 2012, Blyth Spartans had their first ever relegation confirmed after a 1–0 home defeat to Gloucester City.

The following pre-season saw Blyth lose quality players who were not replaced. The season started with mixed results and after very early exits from the FA Cup and the FA Trophy, Cassidy was dismissed. In October under caretaker manager Paddy Atkinson poor performance continued including an 8–1 away defeat to Worksop Town. On 8 March Paddy Atkinson resigned.

==== Tom Wade era ====
On 12 March 2013 it was announced that a further caretaker manager, Tom Wade, would be in post until the end of the season. After some improved results, in early April Wade was given a contract extension for the 2013–14 season. That summer Wade brought in promising youngsters including Rob Nolan and Dean Holmes from North Shields. In early August Arran Wearmouth signed from Bishop Auckland for a fee of £1,500. In the 2014–15 season the Spartans won the Northumberland Senior Cup. In 2014, the Spartans once again went all the way from the first qualifying round into the third round proper. In the first qualifying round, Blyth drew 0–0 at Darlington 1883 and won 3–0 at home with a goal from Robbie Dale and a brace from Dan Maguire. Blyth were then drawn to Skelmersdale United away. Despite a poor league record, Blyth went on rampage to win 4–1. The Green Army had to once again travel to watch the Spartans as they were drawn away at Mickleover Sports. After 90 minutes of play during which it seemed there was going to be a replay at Croft Park, Jarrett Rivers scored an injury time goal to send the Spartans into the fourth qualifying round. The draw away at Leek Town meant another long trip for the Blyth supporters. Blyth won 4–3 after a game which included an injury time penalty miss by Leek's Kinsey.

In the first round proper, Blyth were drawn at home to Altrincham. That was their first home draw in the 2014–15 FA Cup. The home crowd of 1,763 saw a performance that at times brought doubts as to which team was two levels above the other. Braces from Dale and Maguire left the fans delighted with a 4–1 win that would take Blyth to the Second Round Proper for the fourteenth time in their history.

In the second round proper, Blyth travelled along the North Coast to Hartlepool United. The League Two side controlled the game in the first half but a magnificent free-kick by Turnbull and yet another ninetieth-minute goal by Jarrett Rivers turned the game around for Blyth. The memorable upset was shown live on the BBC.

Blyth were drawn at home against Birmingham City, which was controversially described by Stephen Turnbull as "a bit of an anti-climax", for he hoped to face a Premier League club. After two Nikola Žigić chances for the Blues, Blyth took control of the match and Dale scored twice in the first half. Blyth had a 2–0 lead at the interval. Luís Figo famously started to follow the official Blyth Spartans Twitter feed. However, Birmingham would go on to score three goals in six minutes to end the North East side's hopes of reaching the fourth round for the second time.

In the 2015–16 season, despite frustrating displays in almost every cup competition, the Spartans proved to be the dominant side in their league. However, even having reached the impressive 99-point mark, they were beaten to the title by Darlington 1883 and lost the play-off semi-final to Workington A.F.C. which ended 4–3 to the away team. Ten days later, Blyth lost 4–3 again, this time to Northern League side North Shields in the Northumberland Senior Cup Final at St. James's Park.

After a 4–2 home defeat to Morpeth Town in the 2016–17 FA Cup, Wade resigned. Former professional footballer Alun Armstrong took over the managerial position.

==== Promotion to the National League North (2016–present) ====
The club announced on 22 September 2016 that former Ipswich Town striker Alun Armstrong was appointed as manager following Wade's resignation. His first three games as manager were not pretty but also were not a preview of what the rest of the season would look like for Blyth, as the Spartans would never again in the 2016–17 play three consecutive games without a win. In fact, they managed two 12-game runs without recording a single defeat. In the first one, which lasted from the beginning of 2017 until the dying days of February, the Spartans won all of their twelve games, scoring 44 goals and conceding a mere 11. The run was ended by fellow title contenders (and ultimately second-place finishers and play-off winners) Spennymoor. They clinched the league title at home against Halesowen Town with three games to spare. Blyth finished in first place with 101 points, two more than the previous season and 14 ahead of the runners-up. The Northern Premier League Premier Division title was Armstrong's first title as manager, followed just a few days later by his second, the Northumberland Senior Cup, whose final was a replay of the previous year's, this time ending in a 3–2 win for the Spartans.

The success achieved by the club in the 2016–17 season meant that the Spartans were once again promoted to the National League North, five years after their relegation in 2012.

In late 2018, Blyth Spartans received national media attention for signing a sponsorship deal with North Korean travel company Visit North Korea, the move attracted controversy from some commentators due to the country's human rights record.

On 1 June 2019, Blyth Spartans announced the appointment of former Newcastle United and Sunderland midfielder Lee Clark as their new manager. Under Clark, Spartans lost their first four league matches of the season, before a 0–0 draw at Bradford Park Avenue.

On 16 August 2022, former South Shields manager Graham Fenton was appointed as the club's first team manager on a two-year deal. Having kept Blyth in the National League North in the previous season, Fenton was dismissed on 28 December 2023. After being named as the interim manager, Jon Shaw was named as the permanent manager the following day.

In February 2024, the club was taken over by Irfan Liaquat. Following the takeover, there was no significant upturn in form and the club were relegated at the end of the 2023–24 season.

On 16 October 2024, chairman Liaquat announced his intentions to sell the club with immediate effect, citing ongoing boycotts and protests as a key factor in his decision. The following day, the Northern Premier League announced that the club's two upcoming fixtures against Gainsborough Trinity and FC United of Manchester had been postponed due to the league having concerns over certain operational requirements not being in place. On 31 October 2024, the club announced that they had been taken over by a newly former Community Interest Company, "Blyth Spartans CIC 2024", led by local businessman Martin Trinder. Despite the takeover however, the club's finances remained a real issue with a crowdfunding appeal launched in February 2025 to help secure the immediate future of the club. On 15 March 2025, a 3–1 home defeat to Warrington Rylands saw Spartans suffer a second consecutive relegation.

== Women's football ==
During the First World War women working in factories and on the docks played football, including a team in the Spartans' colours and using their ground, variously known as the Blyth Spartan Ladies FC and the Blyth Spartans Munitionettes, with Bella Reay as the star player. The team was never beaten, playing 30 matches, winning 26 and drawing 4. They continued until 1921 when women's football was banned from its grounds by the FA

In 2001 a Blyth Spartans Ladies team was again formed, but despite considerable success closed in 2009. The team had won the Northumberland Football Association Women's Cup Final in May 2008, scoring 4–2 against Whitley Bay Ladies. A significant problem was lack of financial support for the team to travel to matches.

== FA Cup exploits ==
Blyth Spartans have reached the first round proper of the FA Cup 31 times; the second round 14 times; the third round 4 times, the fourth and fifth rounds once.

Notable FA Cup games

- 1971–72 Round 1: Crewe Alexandra 0–1 Blyth Spartans
- 1971–72 Round 2: Blyth Spartans 1–0 Stockport County
- 1971–72 Round 3: Blyth Spartans 2–2 Reading
- 1977–78 Round 1: Blyth Spartans 1–0 Burscough
- 1977–78 Round 2: Blyth Spartans 1–0 Chesterfield
- 1977–78 Round 3: Blyth Spartans 1–0 Enfield
- 1977–78 Round 4: Stoke City 2–3 Blyth Spartans
- 1977–78 Round 5: Wrexham 1–1 Blyth Spartans
- 1977–78 Round 5 (replay): Blyth Spartans 1–2 Wrexham
- 1995–96 Round 1: Bury 0–2 Blyth Spartans
- 1997–98 Round 1: Blackpool 4–3 Blyth Spartans
- 2008–09 Round 1: Blyth Spartans 3–1 Shrewsbury Town
- 2008–09 Round 2: AFC Bournemouth 0–0 Blyth Spartans
- 2008–09 Round 2 (replay): Blyth Spartans 1–0 AFC Bournemouth
- 2008–09 Round 3: Blyth Spartans 0–1 Blackburn Rovers
- 2014–15 Round 1: Blyth Spartans 4–1 Altrincham
- 2014–15 Round 2: Hartlepool United 1–2 Blyth Spartans
- 2014–15 Round 3: Blyth Spartans 2–3 Birmingham City

== Croft Park ==
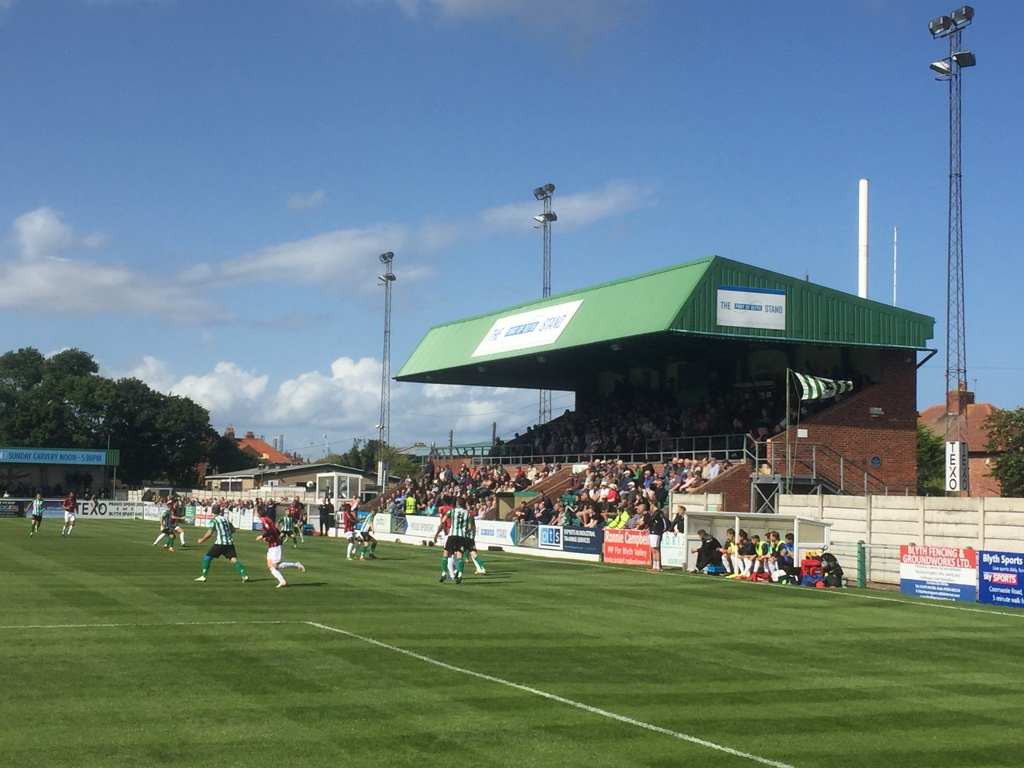
Port of Blyth Stand, Croft Park in 2019

Blyth play their home games at Croft Park, which was opened by Mrs Clarke of Bellister Castle, Haltwhistle on 1 September 1909. The first match was a friendly against Newcastle United which ended in a 4–2 defeat.

In 2003 Croft Park underwent an extensive redevelopment which saw much of the ash terracing levelled and replaced with concrete terracing. New dugouts and a wheelchair enclosure were also added. Further developments have been made to meet full Conference North criteria. These developments include extending the Port of Blyth main stand roof to cover the bottom tier which has had seats installed, building a roof over the Plessey Road terrace, providing cover for 1100, and building three new turnstiles at the Princess Louise Road end.

Following the 2008–09 FA Cup run, some of the money raised was spent on covering the Kingsway Terrace. For the first time Croft Park is now covered on all four sides. The pitch has also been moved by a metre to improve the view from the terraces. And the old goal posts have been taken down and replaced with new modern equipment.

To celebrate Croft Park's centenary Blyth played a Newcastle United side, the team who provided its first opposition. Just like the first game the result finished 4–2 to Newcastle United.

=== Redevelopment ===
In 2003 Croft Park underwent an extensive redevelopment which saw much of the ash terracing levelled and replaced with concrete terracing. New dugouts and a wheelchair enclosure were also added, earlier work carried out had seen two new stairways added to improve access to the seating tier of the Main Stand. These replaced the old central stairway which would often cause congestion next to the team tunnel after full-time. Even before this the Main Stand has seen improvements with the old wooden benches replaced with plastic seats obtained from Newcastle United.

At the end of the 2006–07 season Croft Park underwent further developments to meet full Conference North criteria. These developments include extending the Port of Blyth main stand roof to cover the bottom tier which then had seats installed, and to ensure the views from these seats are unhindered the dugouts were repositioned at the side of the stand.

Along with this a roof was erected over the Plessey Road terrace providing cover for about 1,200. This stand is now sponsored by Carlsberg.

Three new turnstiles were also built at the Croftway end.

Phase Two was completed in 2009 with another new roof added over the Croftway terrace similar to the one over the Plessey End. The ageing West stand (sponsored by Cramlington Caravans) is also being refurbished to extend its life span by another 6 years.

=== Stands ===
Wheelchair Enclosure

Small covered enclosure provided by Artic Windows. Has space for three wheelchairs and is elevated to provide good views of the pitch. Access is via a ramp and is located next to the disabled toilets. Located just to the side of the Main Stand.

Port of Blyth (Main) Stand

Two tier all seater stand and mostly under cover (about 30 seats in the open and just over 530 covered), runs about a quarter the pitch length. Houses the changing rooms, kit room, sponsors' lounge, study support centre, players' lounge, directors' box, press seating and offices.

Tynetec Stand

Southernmost stand and covered, has the formerly imposing Patterson House residential care home just behind it. Can hold about 1,200 on eight steps of terracing. Formerly sponsored by Carlsberg (2007–2010), it is now sponsored by Tynetec.

Fergy Space Stand

The oldest stand at Croft Park, over 70 years old. Located opposite the Port of Blyth Stand on the west side of Croft Park. It has been said it has its own rather chilly micro climate because of the lack of direct sunlight it receives.

Provides cover for about 1,200, the terracing is a lot shallower than the rest of the ground and has views restricted by concrete walls on either side which close off former ash terracing.

Formerly sponsored by Dunston-based Federation Brewery which is where its usual name – 'the Fed Shed' comes from. Now sponsored by Cramlington Caravans although it is still sometimes referred to by its former name.

The stand is currently undergoing refurbishments.

F. Southern Stand

Covered terrace located at the northern end of Croft Park and just off Kingsway Road (which runs parallel to Princess Louise Road). Identical to the Plessey Road Terrace in that it has eight steps of terracing and can hold about 1,200. There are also another couple of turnstiles behind this terrace but these are closed off and unused.

The areas at the side of the Port of Blyth Stand and the Broadway Stand are flat uncovered standing areas.

== Players ==
=== Current squad ===
As of 19 August 2026

Note: Flags indicate national team as defined under FIFA eligibility rules; some limited exceptions apply. Players may hold more than one non-FIFA nationality.

No.	Pos.	Nation	Player
—	GK	ITA	Mauro Asikaogu
—	GK	ENG	Michael Hogan
—	DF	ENG	Spencer Ashcroft
—	DF	ENG	Harry Barclay
—	DF	ENG	Rhys Evans
—	DF	ENG	Jordan Summerly
—	DF	ENG	Jack Vaulks
—	DF	ENG	Jack Walker
—	DF	ENG	Charlie Wood
—	MF	ENG	Paul Dudgeon
—	MF	ENG	Jordan Hickey
—	MF	ENG	Rio Joisce
—	MF	ENG	Ewan McGowan

No.	Pos.	Nation	Player
—	MF	ENG	Harry Richardson
—	MF	ENG	Zach Simpson
—	MF	ENG	Robbie Spence
—	MF	ENG	Paul Van Zandvliet
—	MF	ENG	Joe Watson
—	MF	ENG	Kuba Zmich
—	FW	ENG	Liam Clavering
—	FW	ENG	Jack Foalle
—	FW	ENG	Nathan Kidd
—	FW	ENG	Dan Lanning
—	FW	ENG	Olly Martin
—	FW	ENG	Noah Millington
—	FW	ENG	Lucas Taylor

=== Current backroom staff ===
==== First Team ====
Name	Role
(England) Marc Nash	Manager
(England) Anthony Woodhouse	Assistant manager
(England) Phil Hogg	Goalkeeping coach
(England) Graeme Scott	Physiotherapist

== Managerial history ==
From	To	Manager
1933	1937	Ernie Hoffman
1937	1938	Billy Hogg
1948	1953	Mark Lawton
1953	1954	Tom Blenkinsopp
1954	1959	Dougie Wright
1959	1967	Jim Turney
1967	1967	Tony Knox
1968	1970	Jackie Marks
1970	1972	Allan Jones
1972	1974	Billy Bell
1974	1976	Alan O’Neill
1977	1978	Brian Slane
1978	1981	Jackie Marks
1981	1982	Bob Elwell
1983	1983	John Connolly
1984	1984	Mick Dagless
1984	1985	Peter Feenan

From	To	Manager
1986	1988	Jim Pearson
1988	1988	Dave Clarke
1989	1990	Tommy Dixon
1990	1993	Ronnie Walton
1993	1994	Peter Feenan
1994	1995	Harry Dunn
1995	1995	Tony Lowery/David McCreery
1995	1997	Peter Harrison
1997	1998	John Burridge
1998	1998	Alan Shoulder
1999	1999	John Gamble
1999	2000	Mick Tait
2002	2002	John Charlton
2003	2004	Paul Baker
2004	2009	Harry Dunn

From	To	Manager
2009	2011	Mick Tait
2011	2011	Steve Cuggy
2011	2012	Tommy Cassidy
2012	2013	Paddy Atkinson
2013	2016	Tom Wade
2016	2019	Alun Armstrong
2019	2020	Lee Clark
2020	2021	Michael Nelson
2021	2022	Terry Mitchell
2022	2023	Graham Fenton
2023	2024	Jon Shaw
2024	2024	Nolberto Solano
2024	2024	David Stockdale
2024	2025	Michael Connor
2025	2025	Colin Myers
2025		Marc Nash

== Records ==
- Best FA Cup performance: Fifth round, 1977–78 (replay)
- Best FA Trophy performance: Quarter-finals, 1979–80 (replay), 1982–83 (replay), 2010–11
- Best FA Amateur Cup performance: Semi-finals, 1971–72

== Honours ==
League
Competition		Runners-up		Champions	
Competition		Titles	Seasons	Titles	Seasons
Northern Premier League	Premier Division			2	2005-06, 2016-17
Northern Premier League	Division One			1	1994-95
Northern League		5	1971-72, 1973-74, 1977-78, 1984-85, 1993-94	10	1972-73, 1974-75, 1975-76, 1979-80, 1981-82, 1982-83, 1983-84, 1986-87, 1987-88
North Eastern League		1	1922-23	1	1935-36
East Northumberland League				3	1903-04, 1905–06, 1906–07
Northern Alliance League				2	1908-09, 1912–13

Cups
Competition		Runners-up		Champions	
Competition		Titles	Seasons	Titles	Seasons
Debenhams Cup				1	1978
North Eastern League Cup		1	1936-37	1	1950-55
Northern League Cup				5	1972-73, 1977–78, 1978–79, 1984–85, 1991–92
Northumberland Senior Cup		22	1923, 1924, 1927, 1931, 1933, 1949, 1950, 1960, 1973, 1976, 1983, 1984, 1995, 1996, 1998, 1999, 2006, 2007, 2008, 2011, 2014, 2016	23	1914, 1915, 1932, 1934, 1935, 1936, 1937, 1952, 1955, 1959, 1963, 1972, 1974, 1975, 1978, 1981, 1982, 1985, 1992, 1994, 2015, 2017, 2022
Northumberland Minor Cup		1	1905-06		
Cairns Cup		1	1904-05	2	1905-06, 1906–07
Tynemouth Infirmary Cup		1	1904-05	3	1908-09, 1909–10, 1932–33
Tyne Charity Shield		2	1909-10, 1926–27	2	1913-14, 1925–26
Northumberland Aged Miners Homes Cup		2	1924-25, 1937–38	6	1909-10, 1911–12, 1919–20, 1936–37, 1938–39
Northumberland Aged Miners Homes Cup				5	1982, 1983, 1984, 1988, 1992
Beamish Trophy		1	1996	4	1993, 1994, 1995, 1997
UniBond Competitions	President's Cup			1	1996-97
UniBond Competitions	Chairman's Cup			1	2005-06
UniBond Competitions	Peter Swales Shield			1	2005-06
South Tyneside Football Benevolent Fund Gazette Cup				1	1995-96
Radio Luxemburg Trophy				1	1977-78
Texo Challenge Trophy				1	2019-20
Ronnie Swan Challenge Cup		2	2009,2015		
Northumberland Country Council Unification Shield				1	2010
CEFO CFS Challenge Trophy		1	2021		
