= Horden Community Welfare F.C. =

Association football club in England

Horden Community Welfare
- Full name: Horden Community Welfare Football Club
- Nickname: The Marras
- Founded: 1907 (as Horden Athletic); 2017 (as Horden Community Welfare)
- Ground: Welfare Park
- Coordinates: 54°45′52″N 1°19′2″W
- Chairman: Chris Cain
- Manager: Jonny Payne
- League: Northern League Division One
- 2025–26: Northern League Division One, 11th of 19
Home colours

Horden Community Welfare Football Club is a football club based in Horden, County Durham, England. The club was formed as Horden Athletic in 1907, changing its name to Horden Welfare in 1928, and joined the North Eastern League in 1935, reaching the second round of the FA Cup in the 1938–39 season. After the assets of the original Colliery Welfare were transferred to a new club in Darlington in 2016, Community Welfare was formed in 2017 and has regained the former club's place in the Northern League.

They are currently members of the Northern League Division One and play at Welfare Park in Horden. The ground has one stand, which consists of mainly seating, however below this there is some terracing as well.

== History ==
As Horden Athletic, the club's key successes were winning the Wearside League in 1911–12, 1912–13, and 1913–14, and the Monkwearmouth Charity Cup in 1912–13 and 1922–23. On a national scale, the club reached the first round of the FA Cup in 1925–26, losing 3–2 at home to Football League second division side Darlington.

Horden Colliery Welfare joined the North Eastern League in 1935, winning it in 1938. When that league collapsed in 1958 they spent several years with brief periods in a number of leagues: the Midland League, the Northern Counties League, the reformed North Eastern League (which they won in 1964), and the Wearside League, before being elected to the Northern League in 1975. Horden finished third in the Northern League Division One in 1980 and 1983 and in 1984 beat Blyth Spartans in the League Cup final under former Middlesbrough coach John Coddington.

There was a great FA cup tradition at Welfare Park, a run to the second round in 1938–1939 when they lost 3–2 at home to Newport County, and five further first round appearances. All brought narrow defeats against Southport F.C. (1948, 1–2), Accrington Stanley (1952, 1–2), Wrexham F.C. (1953, 0–1), Scunthorpe United (1954, 0–1) and Blackpool F.C. (1981, 0–1). In 1985 Horden CW faced the biggest challenge of their history when the club was relegated and around the same time Horden Colliery closed. The impact of the pit closure on the community and the loss of the club's main sponsor meant that Horden CW found life a struggle, but in the late 1990s under the management of Peter Todd and later Kevin Taylor things started to look up. Still, Horden spent all but 5 seasons from 1986 to 2013 in the second division of the Northern League, which they won once in 2009.

On 21 July 2010, Martin Wilson, a 24-year-old businessman, took over the club. He was believed to be the youngest chairman in the Football Pyramid. Under the new direction of Wilson, the club aimed to re-brand itself in an attempt to make the club more appealing to younger supporters. However, in November 2010 Wilson left the club and previous owner Norman Stephens regained his place as chairman of the club once again. Horden were later relegated to the Wearside League in 2013.

In 2016, Horden Parish Council demanded that the club vacate their ground at Horden Welfare Park (where the club has been based since their inception in 1908) for unknown reasons. On 29 January of that year, a court case upheld the council's decision and the club was ordered to vacate by 25 February 2016 as well as awarding them legal costs. In October 2016, it was announced that Horden would move 30 miles to Darlington to become the reserve team of National League North club Darlington. The changed their name to Darlington 1883 Reserves and played on the 4G Surface at Eastbourne Sports Complex in Darlington. Horden chairman Norman Stephens said "If the move had not have happened, Horden would have been dead by Xmas". Norman Stephens and some of the playing staff were retained by Darlington who took Horden's place in the Wearside League. They played their first game under the new name on 6 October in a 1–0 away defeat to Boldon C.A. and played their first home game against Annfield Plain on 15 October at Eastbourne Sports Complex.

Following the loss of the original club, Horden Community Welfare were formed in 2017 to bring football back to Welfare Park in the village. Upon their formation, the club were placed into the Durham Alliance League, winning promotion to the Wearside League in their first season. In 2021, the club was admitted into the Northern League Division Two.

After defeat in the play offs in 2022-23 & 2023-24 Horden won the Northern League Division 2 in 2024-2025. This means they will play in the Northern League Division 1 for season 2025-26, their highest level since reforming in 2017.

== Honours ==
- North Eastern League
  - Champions: 1937–38, 1963–64
- Northern Football League Division Two
  - Champions: 2008–09, 2024-25
  - Runners-up: 2002–03
  - Runners-up 2022–23

== Records ==
- FA Cup
  - Second Round 1938–39
- FA Trophy
  - First Round 1970–71, 1972–73, 1979–80, 1981–82, 1983–84, 1984–85
- FA Vase
  - Fourth Round 2022–23

== Former players ==
1. Players who have played/managed in the Football League or any foreign equivalent to this level (i.e. fully professional league).
2. Players with full international caps.
3. Players who hold a club record or have captained the club.

- (England) Tom Baker
- (England) John Hodgson
