= Spennymoor United A.F.C. =

- Full name: Spennymoor United Association Football Club
- Nicknames: The Moors, Spenny
- Founded: 1904
- Dissolved: 2005
- Ground: The Brewery Field
- Capacity: 6,000
Home colours	Away colours

Spennymoor United Association Football Club was an association football club based in Spennymoor, County Durham, England.

== History ==
Spennymoor United Association Football Club was formed in 1904 as an amalgamation of Spennymoor Town and Weardale Ironopolis.

Spennymoor Town was itself an amalgamation of two church football teams in the town, St. Paul's and St. Andrew's in 1890. Weardale Ironopolis was a relatively new club formed in 1901 as a sporting interest for the workers of the Tudhoe Ironworks, and which played in light and dark blue. The “Nops” had a short and successful history in the Croxdale & District League.

In 1905, they joined the Northern League and won the league title six times in their history. In the 1936–37 season, they reached the third round of the FA Cup, where they lost to top-flight side West Bromwich Albion. They also reached the semi-finals of the FA Trophy in 1978. However, misfortune struck the club in 2005 when they folded, with debts at one point having run up to £360,000, causing controversy over unfulfilled fixtures.

The club was reborn as Spennymoor Town, taking over Evenwood Town, which had lost its ground, and using its league place. The "new" Spennymoor won the Northern League Division Two in the 2006–07 season after a late winner against Penrith for a 1–0 victory and earned promotion to Division One.

== Colours ==
In common with other north-east sides (e.g. Newcastle United, Alnwick Town, and Ashington), and Whickham Town F.C. the club wore black and white stripes.

== Ground ==
The club played at the Brewery Field, which had been the home of the renowned Tudhoe Rugby Club, but which was close to extinction.

== Honours ==
- North Eastern League
  - Champions; 1909–10; 1944–45; 1945–46; 1956–57
- Northern League
  - Champions: 1967–68; 1971–72; 1973–74; 1976–77; 1977–78; 1978–79
- Northern Counties East League
  - Champions: 1992–93
- Northern Premier League First Division
  - Runners-up: 1993–94; 2002–03
- Northern Premier League Challenge Cup
  - Winners: 1993–94

== Sources ==
- Spennymoor United at the Football Club History Database
