= Shildon A.F.C. =

Association football club in England

Shildon
- Full name: Shildon Association Football Club
- Nicknames: The Railwaymen
- Founded: 1890 (as Shildon Town)
- Ground: Dean Street; Shildon
- Capacity: 2000
- Coordinates: 54°38′2″N 1°39′2″W
- Chairman: David Dent
- Manager: Chris Hughes
- League: Northern League Division One
- 2025–26: Northern League Division One, 2nd of 19
Home colours	Away colours

Shildon Association Football Club is a football club established in 1890 based in Shildon, County Durham, England. They compete in the Northern League Division One and play at Dean Street.

== History ==
Established in 1890, as Shildon Town first joined the Auckland and District League in 1892. In 1900, the Railwaymen were part of the Northern League Division Two, but folded due to financial issues. The club re-formed as Shildon Athletic in 1903 to take the place of resigned Stockton St Johns in the Northern League. They moved to the North Eastern League in 1907. The Club changed their name to Shildon in 1923, until 1933, when they re-joined the Northern League, after 20th and 21st-place finishes. They enjoyed immediate success, finishing as runner-ups in their first year, before winning four successive titles from 1934 to 1937.

In 1985 Shildon were relegated to the Northern League Division Two after a finish in 18th place. However, they were promoted back to Division One after a finish in 3rd in 1987. The club experienced relegation again in 1992, however they immediately achieved promotion the next year. The Railwaymen spent three years in Division Two after being relegated in 1999, only to be promoted again in 2002 after a first-place finish.

In 2013 Shildon reached the semi-final of the Durham Challenge Cup and the FA Vase, but lost both, in the cup to Spennymoor Town and in the Vase to Tunbridge Wells 4–3 on aggregate. The Railwaymen bounced back, becoming cup holders two straight times. In 2014, with a 2–1 win over Spennymoor Town and in 2015, with a win over Dunston UTS. After finishing runners-up in the Northern League Division One 2015, one point from champions Marske United, the club won the League the following season. In the Durham Challenge Cup the club again finished as semi-finalists in 2018, and finished 3rd in Division One. The Railwaymen won the Durham Challenge cup in 2019, with a 1–0 victory over South Shields. Shildon A.F.C won the most recent Durham Challenge Cup in 2025, with a victory 4-0 over Whickham F.C.

Shildon reached the First Round Proper In the FA Cup for the first time in 1927–28 after a replay win over York City. In November 2003, Shildon reached the FA Cup first round proper for the first time in 42 years. However, they were beaten 7–2 on the day by Notts County.

Shildon's nickname is "The Railwaymen" after the wagon works that was the major employer in the town for many years.

== Ground ==
Shildon play at Dean Street. Bishop Auckland also played at Dean Street for a couple of years in a groundsharing agreement whilst building their new stadium, Heritage Park.

== Honours ==
- Northern Football League
  - Winners: 1933–34, 1934–35, 1935–36, 1936–37, 1939–40, 2015–16
  - Division Two Winners: 2001–02
  - League Cup Winners: 1933–34, 1934–35, 1937–38, 1938–39, 1939–40, 1952–53, 2002–03, 2014–15, 2015–16
- Durham Challenge Cup Winners: 2013–14, 2014–15, 2018-19, 2024-25, 2025-26

== Records ==
- Best FA Cup performance: Second round, 1936–37
- Best FA Amateur Cup performance: Quarter-finals, 1958–59
- Best FA Trophy performance: Third qualifying Round, 1974–75, 1992–93
- Best FA Vase performance: Semi-finals, 2012–13
