= Willington A.F.C. =

Association football club in England

Coordinates: 54°42′31.06″N 1°41′27.06″W

Willington
- "Play hard, make history"
- Full name: Willington Association Football Club
- Nickname: Willo
- Founded: 1906
- Ground: Hall Lane, Willington
- Chairman: Carl Whelpdale
- Manager: Stephen Howe
- League: Wearside League Premier Division
- 2024–25: Wearside League Division One, 1st of 18 (promoted)
Home colours

Willington Association Football Club is an English football club based in Willington, County Durham. The club are currently members of the Wearside League Premier Division and play at Hall Lane.

== History ==
The club was established in 1906 and joined the Northern League in 1911. They finished as runners-up in their second season, and won the league in 1913–14. In 1925–26 they won the league again, and in 1927–28 they reached the semi-final of the FA Amateur Cup, losing 2–1 to Cockfield in a replay. They won a third Northern League title in 1929–30, and in 1938–39 they reached the final of the Amateur Cup, losing 3–0 to Bishop Auckland at Roker Park, Sunderland.

They resigned from the Northern League on 20 March 1940, but rejoined at the end of World War II. In 1945–46 they reached the first round of the FA Cup for the first time, but lost to Bishop Auckland. In 1949–50 they reached the final of the Amateur Cup for a second time, this time defeating Bishop Auckland 4–0 at Wembley Stadium before a crowd of 88,000. The following season they entered the FA Cup in the first round, but lost 3–0 to Rochdale. During this period the club finished in the top nine in every season until 1960, but thereafter saw a gradual decline, although they reached the first round of the FA Cup again in 1973–74, losing 6–1 to Blackburn Rovers in a replay.

In 1982 the league added a second division, and after finishing bottom of Division One in 1982–83, Willington were relegated to Division Two. The club struggled in the second tier, finishing bottom of the league in 1983–84 and 1991–92, and only finishing in the top ten five times in twenty-two seasons. After finishing bottom again in 2004–05 they were relegated to the Wearside League. They continued to struggle, finishing second from bottom in their first two seasons in the league, and then bottom in 2008–09 and 2009–10.

Their traditional local rivals are Crook Town. The club has had a number of famous managers including both Malcolm Allison and Alan Durban in 1984 and also Eddie Kyle, Alan Murray and Stan Cummins.

The 2017–18 campaign saw Willington AFC have their best Northern League points tally for 42 years (1976).

== Honours ==
- FA Amateur Cup
  - Winners 1949–50
- Northern League
  - Champions 1913–14, 1925–26, 1929–30
  - League Cup winners 1956–57, 1974–75
- Wearside League
  - Runners-up 2012–13
  - Division One champions 2024-25
