= List of Spennymoor Town F.C. seasons =

Spennymoor Town Football Club is a football club based in Spennymoor, County Durham, in the North East of England. They currently compete in the National League North, the sixth tier of English football, and currently play their home matches at The Brewery Field.

The club formed in 2005 by merger between Evenwood Town and Spennymoor United, who had folded earlier that year, and collectively changed their name to Spennymoor Town.

== Seasons ==
Year	League														Cup competitions					Manager
Year	Division	Lvl	Pld	W	D	L	GF	GA	GD	Pts	Position	Leading league scorer		Average attendance	FA Cup		FA Trophy		Durham Challenge Cup	Manager
Year	Division	Lvl	Pld	W	D	L	GF	GA	GD	Pts	Position	Name	Goals	Average attendance	Res	Rec	Res	Rec	Durham Challenge Cup	Manager
Club formed after Spennymoor United folded, replacing Evenwood Town.
2005–06	Northern League; Division Two	10	38	16	11	11	70	66	+4	59	8th of 20	Martin Houlahan	15		PR	0–0–1	FA Vase QR2	0–0–1	R2	Ken Houlahan; Justin Perry
2006–07	Northern League; Division Two	10	40	29	9	2	85	33	+52	96	1st of 21	Adam Johnston	13		QR1	1–0–1	FA Vase QR2	0–0–1	R1	Jamie Pollock
2007–08	Northern League; Division One	9	42	14	14	14	68	52	+16	56	12th of 22	Jamie Clarke	16		QR2	3–0–1	FA Vase R2	2–1–1	SF	Jason Ainsley
2008–09	Northern League; Division One	9	42	24	10	8	78	49	+29	82	4th of 22	Jamie Clarke	30		EPR	0–0–1	FA Vase R5	5–2–1	R1	Jason Ainsley
2009–10	Northern League; Division One	9	42	31	7	4	118	33	+85	100	1st of 22	Gavin Cogdon	20		QR2	3–0–1	FA Vase QR2	1–0–1	R3	Jason Ainsley
2010–11	Northern League; Division One	9	42	33	4	5	116	31	+85	103	1st of 22	Steven Richardson	21		QR1	2–0–1	FA Vase R5	4–0–1	SF	Jason Ainsley
2011–12	Northern League; Division One	9	42	30	7	5	86	31	+55	97	1st of 22	Sonny Andrews	13		QR3	4–0–1	FA Vase R3	1–0–1	W	Jason Ainsley
2012–13	Northern League; Division One	9	46	33	10	3	108	34	+74	109	2nd of 24	Mark Davison	19		QR2	3–0–1	FA Vase R1	9–0–0	W	Jason Ainsley
2013–14	Northern League; Division One	9	44	30	10	4	117	38	+79	100	1st of 23	Liam Henderson	37		QR1	2–1–1	FA Vase R5	3–1–1	F	Jason Ainsley
2014–15	Northern Premier League; Division One North	8	42	22	11	9	76	45	+31	77	5th of 22	Andrew Stephenson	14	542	QR4	4–1–1	R1	4–1–1	SF	Jason Ainsley
2014–15	Northern Premier League; Division One North	8	Lost in the play-off semi-final												QR4	4–1–1	R1	4–1–1	SF	Jason Ainsley
2015–16	Northern Premier League; Division One North	8	42	27	10	5	113	35	+78	91	2nd of 22	Nathan Fisher	34	457	QR2	2–1–1	QR3	3–1–1		Jason Ainsley
2015–16	Northern Premier League; Division One North	8	Promoted after winning the play-off												QR2	2–1–1	QR3	3–1–1		Jason Ainsley
2016–17	Northern Premier League; Division One North	7	46	25	12	9	96	48	+48	87	2nd of 22	Glen Taylor	19	555	R1	4–0–1	QR1	0–0–1		Jason Ainsley
2016–17	Northern Premier League; Division One North	7	Promoted after winning the play-off												R1	4–0–1	QR1	0–0–1		Jason Ainsley
2017–18	National League North	6	42	18	9	15	71	67	+4	63	8th of 22	Glen Taylor	19	834	QR2	0–0–1	R4	3–3–1	QF	Jason Ainsley
2018–19	National League North	6	42	22	10	10	78	48	+30	76	4th of 22	Glen Taylor	26	829	QR2	0–0–1	R3	3–0–1		Jason Ainsley
2018–19	National League North	6	Lost in the play-off final.												QR2	0–0–1	R3	3–0–1		Jason Ainsley
2019–20	National League North	6	34	15	10	9	63	45	+18	55	8th of 22	Glen Taylor	17	1,183	QR4	2–0–1	QR3	0–0–1	W	Jason Ainsley
2019–20	National League North	6	The regular season was cut short due to COVID-19, final league positions decided by points-per-game												QR4	2–0–1	QR3	0–0–1	W	Jason Ainsley
2020–21	National League North	6	13	5	5	3	18	14	+4	20	13th of 22	Glen Taylor	8	– (Note: Most of the games were played behind the closed doors.)	QR3	1–0–1	R3	1–1–0		Jason Ainsley; Tommy Miller
2020–21	National League North	6	The season was declared null and void due to COVID-19												QR3	1–0–1	R3	1–1–0		Jason Ainsley; Tommy Miller
2021–22	National League North	6	42	17	9	16	55	51	+4	60	10th of 22	Glen Taylor	25	1,420	QR3	1–2–1	R5	2–1–1	QF	Tommy Miller; Anthony Johnson & Bernard Morley
2022–23	National League North	6	46	18	14	14	68	67	+1	68	9th of 24	Glen Taylor	23	1,339	QR2	0–0–1	R3	1–0–1	F	Anthony Johnson & Bernard Morley; Jason Ainsley
2023–24	National League North	6	46	22	8	19	74	62	+12	74	9th of 24	Will Harris	16	1,254	QR2	0–1–1	R2	0–0–1		Jamie Chandler; Graeme Lee
2024–25	National League North	6	46	21	13	12	76	50	+26	76	9th of 24	Glen Taylor	18	1,278	QR4	2–0–1	F	4–2–1		Graeme Lee
