= 2012–13 Northern Football League =

Northern League
- Season: 2012–13

The 2012–13 Northern Football League season was the 115th in the history of Northern Football League, a football competition in England.

== Division One ==
Northern Football League Division One
- Season: 2012–13
- Champions: Darlington 1883
- Promoted: Darlington 1883
- Relegated: South Shields; Norton & Stockton Ancients
- Matches: 552
- Goals: 1,981 (3.59 per match)
- Top goalscorer: Andrew Johnson (Bishop Auckland) (38 goals)

Division One featured 19 clubs which competed in the division last season, along with five new clubs.

- Clubs promoted from Division Two:
  - Gillford Park, who also changed name to Celtic Nation
  - Hebburn Town
  - Team Northumbria
- Plus:
  - Darlington 1883, new club formed after original club folded
  - Durham City, resigned from the Northern Premier League

- From this league, only Bishop Auckland, Celtic Nation, Darlington 1883 and Spennymoor Town applied for promotion.

=== League table ===
Pos	Team	Pld	W	D	L	GF	GA	GD	Pts	Promotion or relegation
1	Darlington 1883	46	40	2	4	145	35	+110	122	Promoted to the Northern Premier League Division One North
2	Spennymoor Town	46	33	10	3	108	34	+74	109	
3	Whitley Bay	46	27	7	12	110	62	+48	88	
4	West Auckland Town	46	25	9	12	112	75	+37	84	
5	Dunston UTS	46	23	10	13	74	50	+24	79	
6	Bishop Auckland	46	24	7	15	95	77	+18	79	
7	Ashington	46	21	13	12	106	68	+38	76	
8	Shildon	46	19	12	15	83	69	+14	69	
9	Consett	46	19	11	16	68	63	+5	68	
10	Celtic Nation	46	19	10	17	80	79	+1	67	
11	Guisborough Town	46	20	6	20	78	87	−9	66	
12	Bedlington Terriers	46	18	7	21	90	83	+7	61	
13	Billingham Synthonia	46	17	10	19	79	83	−4	61	
14	Penrith	46	17	9	20	92	96	−4	60	
15	Durham City	46	17	8	21	90	90	0	59	
16	Team Northumbria	46	14	14	18	63	80	−17	56	
17	Newton Aycliffe	46	16	5	25	71	89	−18	53	
18	Hebburn Town	46	15	8	23	81	109	−28	53	
19	Marske United	46	15	4	27	66	91	−25	49	
20	Billingham Town	46	13	8	25	84	125	−41	47	
21	Newcastle Benfield	46	14	4	28	51	88	−37	46	
22	Sunderland RCA	46	12	8	26	62	103	−41	41 (Note: Sunderland RCA deducted three points for fielding an ineligible player.)	
23	South Shields	46	11	5	30	54	117	−63	38	Relegated to Division Two
24	Norton & Stockton Ancients	46	6	7	33	39	128	−89	25	Relegated to Division Two

Source: fchd
Rules for classification: 1) points; 2) goal difference; 3) number of goals scored.

=== Results ===
Home \ Away	ASH	BED	BLS	BLT	BIS	CEL	CON	DAR	DUN	DUR	GUI	HEB	MAR	NCB	NTA	NSA	PEN	SHI	SSH	SPE	RCA	TNO	WAT	WHI
Ashington		3–3	2–1	8–1	0–1	4–1	0–0	0–1	1–1	6–2	1–2	1–1	2–2	3–0	3–1	4–1	2–2	1–2	2–0	1–2	3–1	2–0	3–3	1–2
Bedlington Terriers	4–0		6–0	0–2	1–3	2–4	1–3	0–4	1–1	6–2	1–0	5–2	3–1	4–0	0–0	0–0	3–1	8–1	1–2	0–6	2–3	5–1	4–2	1–1
Billingham Synthonia	2–2	1–3		0–1	3–2	1–3	1–1	1–4	0–0	1–1	0–2	1–1	4–1	3–4	0–1	2–2	1–0	1–1	4–1	0–1	2–0	3–2	2–2	2–1
Billingham Town	2–4	4–4	1–3		2–5	0–0	1–0	1–7	2–5	2–2	4–2	2–5	0–4	2–1	3–2	3–0	2–1	0–0	2–1	0–3	1–1	4–0	1–4	1–2
Bishop Auckland	2–1	2–1	0–8	6–2		1–2	1–1	1–3	0–0	2–3	2–1	0–1	3–2	3–0	3–1	4–0	6–2	1–3	4–2	1–1	1–0	2–0	3–4	1–4
Celtic Nation	2–0	2–0	1–4	3–1	2–2		2–2	1–2	0–1	2–1	3–2	3–0	1–1	2–1	1–1	1–0	3–3	2–3	1–0	0–3	2–1	3–3	1–3	1–3
Consett	2–2	1–0	4–1	3–2	4–2	2–0		0–3	1–0	0–2	1–0	2–3	1–2	1–2 (Note: (29 Apr 0-2) : Abn 77 mins floodlight failure. - Replay is 13 May 2013.)	1–3	2–0	0–2	1–1	1–1	2–2	3–0	0–1	3–4	0–1
Darlington 1883	6–1	3–1	4–1	3–2	2–2	1–0	5–0		4–0	3–1	3–0	1–0	3–0	5–2	1–0	6–1	1–0	4–0	2–1	0–0	7–2	3–1	2–0	3–1
Dunston UTS	2–2	2–1	2–0	1–1	1–1	1–0	0–2	0–3		3–1	4–0	3–1	3–0	2–0	0–2	3–0	2–3	1–3	4–0	2–2	0–1	1–0	5–2	2–1
Durham City	2–3	3–1	1–2	6–1	0–2	6–3	3–2	0–4	2–0		1–2	4–2	0–1	4–0	5–2	1–2	4–4	1–0	6–1	2–3	1–2	0–2	3–1	0–4
Guisborough Town	1–0	1–2	2–4	3–7	3–2	3–1	0–2	4–1	1–1	3–0		4–3	1–0	1–0	5–1	5–0	0–3	0–3	1–3	0–6	2–1	1–1	3–2	1–3
Hebburn Town	3–5	2–3	4–0	4–3	0–0	4–3	1–1	1–7	0–3	0–1	1–3		4–3	1–1	1–2	3–3	1–4	3–2	0–4	0–4	3–3	2–2	0–3	4–1
Marske United	1–5	3–1	0–3	3–1	1–3	2–1	1–2	0–5	0–2	1–3	0–1	2–4		2–1	1–0	1–0	2–2	2–2	1–2	2–3	1–3	4–0	1–0	0–3
Newcastle Benfield	0–2	2–0	0–2	2–1	0–1	0–4	0–1	0–4	1–2	1–0	4–4	1–3	2–1		1–0	1–0	2–3	1–0	0–0	0–2	1–0	1–1	1–3	2–4
Newton Aycliffe	2–1	4–0	1–1	0–8	1–5	1–2	0–2	2–1	0–1	0–1	3–1	1–4	1–0	0–3		4–0	1–3	3–1	2–3	1–2	2–0	5–1	2–1	2–3
Norton & Stockton Ancients	0–5	1–0	1–0	3–3	0–2	1–4	0–4	2–4	1–2	0–3	0–1	1–0	0–3	3–1	0–5		1–2	2–2	1–2	0–6	1–3	1–1	0–7	1–3
Penrith	3–4	1–4	5–0	2–2	0–2	5–1	1–2	1–4	2–2	3–2	0–1	1–2	1–2	3–1	1–3	6–0		2–2	3–2	3–2	2–1	0–1	0–1	2–2
Shildon	0–2	3–0	2–1	1–3	2–1	2–2	4–1	0–2	0–2	3–1	2–0	3–2	2–3	2–0	2–1	2–0	4–1		11–0	1–1	2–3	1–1	1–1	0–2
South Shields	0–2	1–3	0–1	3–2	0–1	2–1	1–2	0–3	0–4	1–1	3–2	0–2	0–4	0–2	3–3	3–2	5–1	0–2		0–4	2–4	1–3	1–1	1–6
Spennymoor Town	0–0	0–0	4–2	3–0	4–0	1–1	3–1	1–3	2–0	3–2	2–2	3–0	1–0	2–0	2–0	2–0	0–1	2–0	1–0		2–1	3–0	2–0	3–1
Sunderland RCA	0–6	0–1	1–3	2–0 (Note: (6 Apr 1-0) : Billingham Town have asked for the game to be replayed. - new date is 7 May 2013.)	1–5	0–2	2–2	0–4	0–1	1–1	3–3	1–0	3–2	0–3	2–2	3–4	2–0	0–3	3–2	1–1		2–3	1–2	0–1
Team Northumbria	1–1	2–3	2–2	3–0	3–1	1–3	0–0	2–0	2–0	0–0	1–1	0–2	3–2	2–4	3–0	2–2	1–2	1–1	2–0	0–2	5–1		0–1	2–2
West Auckland Town	2–2	2–1	2–4	4–1	5–1	0–1	2–0	2–1	3–2	3–3	2–0	4–1	2–1	3–2	4–2	4–2	2–2	0–0	6–0	2–3	6–2	0–1		3–2
Whitley Bay	1–3	1–0	2–1	6–0	0–2	2–2	0–2	0–3	1–0	2–2	0–3	5–0	4–0	2–0	3–1	3–0	8–3	3–1	3–0	2–3	1–1	6–0	2–2	

Source: League Official
Legend: Blue = home team win; Yellow = draw; Red = away team win.

== Division Two ==
Northern Football League Division Two
- Season: 2012–13
- Champions: Crook Town
- Promoted: Crook Town; Morpeth Town
- Relegated: Horden Colliery Welfare
- Matches: 462
- Goals: 1,706 (3.69 per match)
- Top goalscorer: John Butler (Ryhope Colliery Welfare) (56 goals)

Division Two featured 18 clubs which competed in the division last season, along with four new clubs:

- Clubs relegated from Division One:
  - Jarrow Roofing BCA
  - Stokesley Sports Club
  - Tow Law Town
- Plus:
  - Ryhope Colliery Welfare, promoted from the Wearside Football League

=== League table ===
Pos	Team	Pld	W	D	L	GF	GA	GD	Pts	Promotion or relegation
1	Crook Town	42	32	5	5	123	60	+63	101	Promoted to Division One
2	Ryhope Colliery Welfare	42	30	8	4	147	52	+95	98	Demoted to the Northern Football Alliance
3	Morpeth Town	42	25	10	7	108	51	+57	85	Promoted to Division One
4	Jarrow Roofing BCA	42	26	7	9	100	46	+54	85	
5	Darlington Railway Athletic	42	22	12	8	82	57	+25	78	
6	Northallerton Town	42	23	8	11	101	63	+38	77	
7	West Allotment Celtic	42	23	8	11	95	66	+29	77	
8	North Shields	42	21	7	14	72	54	+18	70	
9	Whitehaven	42	20	8	14	97	74	+23	65 (Note: Whitehaven deducted three points for fielding an ineligible player.)	
10	Seaham Red Star	42	19	8	15	86	85	+1	65	
11	Tow Law Town	42	19	7	16	83	66	+17	64	
12	Washington	42	16	4	22	72	93	−21	52	
13	Chester-le-Street Town	42	13	10	19	51	73	−22	49	
14	Ryton & Crawcrook Albion	42	15	4	23	56	82	−26	49	
15	Stokesley Sports Club	42	12	8	22	60	93	−33	44	
16	Whickham	42	11	8	23	57	86	−29	41	
17	Birtley Town	42	10	8	24	47	83	−36	38	
18	Brandon United	42	10	11	21	55	93	−38	38 (Note: Esh Winning, Brandon United deducted three points for fielding an ineligible player.)	
19	Thornaby	42	9	5	28	59	106	−47	32	
20	Esh Winning	42	10	3	29	49	108	−59	30	
21	Alnwick Town	42	8	8	26	63	100	−37	29 (Note: Alnwick Town deducted three points for fielding an ineligible player.)	
22	Horden Colliery Welfare	42	7	5	30	43	115	−72	26	Relegated to the Wearside League

Source: fchd
Rules for classification: 1) points; 2) goal difference; 3) number of goals scored.

=== Results ===
Home \ Away	ALN	BIR	BRA	CLS	CRO	DRA	ESH	HCW	JRO	MOR	NSH	NOR	RCW	RYC	SRS	SSC	THO	TOW	WAS	WAC	WHC	WHA
Alnwick Town		0–1	2–2	4–1	2–3	0–2	5–1	1–1	0–0	0–4	2–2	0–4	1–1	1–3	3–4	1–1	4–1	2–0	5–2	0–4	0–1	2–4
Birtley Town	3–3		2–1	1–2	1–2	1–1	2–1	0–2	1–2	0–3	0–3	0–2	1–6	0–1	2–1	0–3	4–1	0–2	3–3	2–0	2–2	4–3
Brandon United	4–0	3–1		1–1	1–2	1–5	2–2	3–1	1–10	1–4	2–2	2–1	1–2	1–0	6–3	2–1	0–1	0–4	1–1	0–0	1–1	1–4
Chester-le-Street Town	2–0	2–0	2–2		2–3	1–1	6–1	0–0	0–1	0–2	0–2	1–5	1–2	2–0	1–2	0–1	1–0	0–5	0–0	1–1	1–2	2–1
Crook Town	3–2	5–1	2–2	6–0		2–2	2–0	4–1	1–1	3–2	3–1	2–0	3–2	5–0	7–1	2–0	6–1	1–3	7–1	2–0	1–1	3–1
Darlington Railway Athletic	4–2	2–1	1–1	0–0	3–2		8–1	3–1	1–0	1–2	2–1	1–2	1–6	1–0	1–1	5–0	4–2	3–0	0–1	1–1	1–0	0–0
Esh Winning	2–1	0–2	2–0	0–1	6–2	1–1		1–2	2–0	1–5	1–2	3–1	0–5	0–3	4–1	2–3	0–5	0–2	0–4	0–3	4–2	2–3
Horden Colliery Welfare	1–2	2–2	3–0	1–2	1–2	0–1	1–0		0–3	1–3	0–3	1–4	0–5	1–3	0–4	1–2	2–1	1–2	2–0	2–5	1–3	2–6
Jarrow Roofing BCA	3–1	4–0	3–0	6–1	2–3	0–3	2–0	10–2		3–2	1–0	0–2	2–2	2–0	3–3	3–0	1–1	3–0	1–2	5–1	2–0	3–2
Morpeth Town	4–1	0–0	5–2	4–2	3–1	9–1	1–0	0–0	3–2		1–2	6–0	3–4	2–3	0–3	3–1	2–1	1–0	6–1	1–1	0–0	2–0
North Shields	1–0	1–0	1–0	0–2	2–0	3–0	2–1	2–0	0–0	1–1		0–2	2–2	2–1	7–2	0–1	1–2	0–2	3–0	2–3	3–0	1–1
Northallerton Town	3–1	4–0	4–2	2–0	3–3	1–1	1–2	3–0	0–4	0–2	5–1		2–2	1–1	5–2	4–1	7–1	2–2	3–4	0–1	1–0	4–0
Ryhope Colliery Welfare	4–3	2–0	3–0	5–0	2–5	3–0	4–0	5–0	1–0	2–2	1–3	3–1		5–0	2–2	5–0	5–1	1–3	1–0	7–1	3–1	5–2
Ryton & Crawcrook Albion	3–2	0–2	1–1	0–2	1–3	0–1	3–1	1–0	1–2	0–2	1–3	1–1	0–3		4–3	3–2	0–2	0–5	1–0	0–0	3–0	4–6
Seaham Red Star	3–1	1–0	4–0	0–3	2–5	2–2	2–1	3–0	2–1	1–1	1–0	2–4	0–5	3–1		6–0	2–3	2–2	2–0	3–3	0–0	1–2
Stokesley Sports Club	4–0	0–0	0–1	2–2	0–1	0–3	1–1	5–1	0–0	1–1	0–1	0–2	0–7	3–4	1–0		1–3	2–2	3–2	0–2	7–2	2–3
Thornaby	2–3	1–1	0–2	1–3	0–1	0–2	2–3	2–0	0–1	3–3	0–6	3–5	4–4	1–2	0–2	5–2		0–4	2–4	0–2	0–1	1–4
Tow Law Town	0–0	2–0	1–2	3–1	2–3	1–2	3–0	2–3	0–1	3–1	5–1	2–2	2–5	1–4	1–2	2–5	0–0		3–1	1–5	2–0	0–1
Washington	4–2	1–3	3–2	1–0	0–3	1–2	2–0	5–2	2–3	1–3	2–4	2–0	0–6	2–1	1–2	6–0	1–3	1–2		1–4	2–0	2–4
West Allotment Celtic	2–0	4–1	1–0	3–1	2–4	0–4	6–0	7–0	3–5	4–4	2–0	1–4	2–2	2–1	2–1	3–1	5–2	1–3	1–2		2–1	1–0
Whickham	2–3	3–2	3–1	1–1	2–3	5–3	1–2	3–2	1–2	0–3	4–0	1–2	2–5	1–0	1–2	1–3	2–0	2–2	2–2	1–4		1–4
Whitehaven	4–1	2–1	4–0	1–1	1–2	2–2	4–1	2–2	2–3	0–2	1–1	2–2	1–2	5–1	0–3	1–1	3–1	5–2	1–2	1–0	4–1	

Source: League Official
Legend: Blue = home team win; Yellow = draw; Red = away team win.
