= 2008–09 Northern Football League =

The 2008–09 Northern Football League season was the 111th in the history of Northern Football League, a football competition in England.

== Division One ==
Northern Football League Division One
- Season: 2008–09
- Champions: Newcastle Benfield
- Relegated: Northallerton Town; Seaham Red Star
- Matches: 462
- Goals: 1,567 (3.39 per match)

Division One featured 19 clubs which competed in the division last season, along with three new clubs, promoted from Division Two:

- Penrith Town, who also changed name to Penrith
- Ryton
- South Shields

=== League table ===
Pos	Team	Pld	W	D	L	GF	GA	GD	Pts	Promotion or relegation
1	Newcastle Benfield	42	25	9	8	78	42	+36	84	
2	Consett	42	25	8	9	91	51	+40	83	
3	Whitley Bay	42	25	7	10	108	58	+50	82	
4	Spennymoor Town	42	24	10	8	78	49	+29	82	
5	Sunderland Nissan	42	23	9	10	93	56	+37	78	Club folded
6	Dunston Federation	42	20	13	9	77	48	+29	73	
7	Penrith	42	21	8	13	90	62	+28	71	
8	Shildon	42	18	15	9	84	58	+26	69	
9	West Allotment Celtic	42	19	11	12	66	60	+6	68	
10	Ryton	42	18	8	16	81	77	+4	62	
11	Tow Law Town	42	17	11	14	73	69	+4	62	
12	Morpeth Town	42	19	4	19	64	68	−4	61	
13	Chester-le-Street Town	42	17	7	18	74	72	+2	58	
14	Bedlington Terriers	42	15	9	18	66	76	−10	54	
15	Billingham Synthonia	42	12	11	19	68	75	−7	47	
16	Ashington	42	13	8	21	63	83	−20	47	
17	Billingham Town	42	11	8	23	63	96	−33	41	
18	Bishop Auckland	42	9	11	22	56	85	−29	38	
19	South Shields	42	9	10	23	52	79	−27	37	
20	West Auckland Town	42	8	7	27	50	99	−49	31	
21	Seaham Red Star	42	8	7	27	42	94	−52	31	Relegated to Division Two
22	Northallerton Town	42	8	5	29	50	110	−60	29	Relegated to Division Two

Source: fchd
Rules for classification: 1) points; 2) goal difference; 3) number of goals scored.

== Division Two ==
Northern Football League Division Two
- Season: 2008–09
- Champions: Horden Colliery Welfare
- Promoted: Esh Winning; Horden Colliery Welfare; Norton & Stockton Ancients
- Matches: 380
- Goals: 1,318 (3.47 per match)

Division Two featured 17 clubs which competed in the division last season, along with three new clubs:

- Jarrow Roofing BCA, relegated from Division One
- Washington, relegated from Division One
- Whitehaven, promoted from the Wearside Football League

=== League table ===
Pos	Team	Pld	W	D	L	GF	GA	GD	Pts	Promotion
1	Horden Colliery Welfare	38	24	8	6	92	44	+48	80	Promoted to Division One
2	Norton & Stockton Ancients	38	24	8	6	79	36	+43	80	Promoted to Division One
3	Esh Winning	38	23	8	7	89	59	+30	77	Promoted to Division One
4	Sunderland RCA	38	21	8	9	88	46	+42	71	
5	Marske United	38	18	8	12	63	59	+4	62	
6	Brandon United	38	18	7	13	85	67	+18	61	
7	Guisborough Town	38	18	7	13	71	53	+18	61	
8	Birtley Town	38	18	7	13	73	62	+11	61	
9	Crook Town	38	17	7	14	68	71	−3	58	
10	Hebburn Town	38	15	10	13	71	83	−12	55	
11	Whitehaven	38	15	8	15	57	52	+5	53	
12	Team Northumbria	38	13	12	13	75	66	+9	51	
13	Stokesley Sports Club	38	14	7	17	63	67	−4	49	
14	Whickham	38	14	7	17	55	73	−18	49	
15	North Shields	38	13	6	19	53	76	−23	45	
16	Jarrow Roofing BCA	38	11	4	23	50	78	−28	37	
17	Washington	38	10	6	22	44	61	−17	33 (Note: Washington were deducted three points.)	
18	Darlington Railway Athletic	38	10	2	26	45	80	−35	32	
19	Prudhoe Town	38	5	11	22	47	88	−41	26	Resigned to the Wearside Football League
20	Thornaby	38	5	7	26	50	97	−47	22	

Source: fchd
Rules for classification: 1) points; 2) goal difference; 3) number of goals scored.
