= 2014–15 Northern Football League =

The 2014–15 season was the 117th in the history of Northern Football League, a football competition in England. The league has operated two divisions in the English football league system, Division One at step 5, and Division Two at step 6.

== Division One ==
Northern Football League Division One
- Season: 2014–15
- Champions: Marske United
- Relegated: Billingham Synthonia; Crook Town
- Matches: 462
- Goals: 1,766 (3.82 per match)

Division One featured 19 clubs which competed in the division last season, along with three new clubs, promoted from Division Two:

- Jarrow Roofing BCA
- North Shields
- West Allotment Celtic

Only Bishop Auckland applied for promotion to Step 4.

=== Division One table ===
Pos	Team	Pld	W	D	L	GF	GA	GD	Pts	Promotion or relegation
1	Marske United	42	27	9	6	118	54	+64	90	
2	Shildon	42	28	5	9	109	48	+61	89	
3	Guisborough Town	42	26	8	8	101	50	+51	86	
4	North Shields	42	26	7	9	87	49	+38	85	
5	West Auckland Town	42	25	7	10	106	58	+48	82	
6	Dunston UTS	42	23	7	12	75	51	+24	76	
7	Jarrow Roofing BCA	42	21	7	14	84	61	+23	70	
8	Morpeth Town	42	19	13	10	90	70	+20	70	
9	Consett	42	20	9	13	110	85	+25	69	
10	Newcastle Benfield	42	18	8	16	92	73	+19	62	
11	Bishop Auckland	42	20	2	20	75	75	0	62	
12	Durham City	42	17	7	18	76	76	0	58	
13	Ashington	42	17	5	20	77	77	0	56	
14	Penrith	42	15	11	16	68	74	−6	56	
15	Whitley Bay	42	17	5	20	81	97	−16	56	
16	Sunderland RCA	42	13	8	21	66	87	−21	47	
17	Bedlington Terriers	42	13	5	24	75	97	−22	44	
18	Newton Aycliffe	42	13	3	26	57	78	−21	42	
19	West Allotment Celtic	42	12	4	26	59	101	−42	40	
20	Billingham Synthonia	42	11	4	27	69	102	−33	37	Relegated to Division Two
21	Celtic Nation	42	7	7	28	52	121	−69	28	Club folded (Note: Celtic Nation resigned at the end of the season and folded due to financial problems.)
22	Crook Town	42	1	5	36	39	182	−143	5 (Note: Crook Town were deducted three points.)	Relegated to Division Two

Source: fchd
Rules for classification: 1) points; 2) goal difference; 3) number of goals scored.

=== Results ===
Home \ Away	ASH	BED	BLS	BIS	CEL	CON	CRO	DUN	DUR	GUI	JRO	MAR	MOR	NCB	NTA	NSH	PEN	SHI	RCA	WAC	WAT	WHI
Ashington		1–3	3–1	6–1	6–0	2–0	4–1	2–4	2–0	0–0	2–2	2–3	0–2	0–2	1–2	1–2	2–1	1–2	1–0	4–0	1–2	1–1
Bedlington Terriers	0–1		5–0	1–2	2–6	6–4	11–1	0–1	2–1	0–3	0–2	1–1	4–1	3–0	0–4	1–2	1–4	1–1	2–0	2–4	0–0	1–2
Billingham Synthonia	5–2	1–2		1–3	3–0	4–4	8–0	0–1	1–1	1–2	2–0	0–2	0–2	1–3	0–1	2–4	1–3	0–4	1–3	3–0	1–2	3–5
Bishop Auckland	2–0	3–0	4–2		2–1	1–1	4–0	2–1	1–2	0–5	2–1	2–6	3–0	4–4	1–0	0–3	0–2	1–0	1–2	0–1	1–4	4–1
Celtic Nation	2–2	2–0	2–3	0–1		1–7	4–1	1–0	2–2	0–1	1–3	2–3	2–4	4–5	3–2	0–1	1–1	0–6	1–6	4–1	2–3	1–6
Consett	6–2	6–3	1–1	5–2	4–0		5–0	1–3	3–3	1–0	3–0	1–4	5–1	1–1	4–0	2–2	2–1	1–5	2–1	7–0	2–3	4–1
Crook Town	1–1	2–6	0–7	0–6	0–0	0–4		1–3	1–3	1–3	2–6	1–6	1–3	2–5	0–2	1–5	4–4	0–11	0–4	3–1	0–4	0–7
Dunston UTS	0–1	1–0	3–2	1–0	5–0	3–2	7–2		5–4	3–4	1–0	1–3	1–3	0–0	2–1	4–0	3–2	2–4	2–2	3–2	2–1	1–0
Durham City	0–2	2–3	1–2	3–0	4–0	0–0	2–1	0–0		2–4	0–3	4–1	1–1	2–1	3–2	2–0	0–2	4–3	3–1	0–2	2–1	3–4
Guisborough Town	4–0	0–0	6–0	0–2	3–1	3–0	2–0	3–1	3–4		4–1	1–2	2–2	3–2	4–0	0–3	1–1	1–0	4–1	6–0	5–6	1–2
Jarrow Roofing BCA	3–2	3–0	5–1	1–0	1–1	5–0	4–2	0–0	0–2	1–2		1–0	1–3	1–0	4–2	0–2	4–0	1–1	2–1	3–1	3–1	1–1
Marske United	4–0	3–3	2–0	5–3	8–0	2–1	3–2	0–0	1–0	2–2	0–2		2–2	1–0	4–0	3–2	7–0	1–3	3–1	4–1	4–2	4–0
Morpeth Town	2–1	1–2	4–0	3–1	2–2	2–3	3–0	1–3	6–0	4–3	2–2	1–1		2–2	1–4	1–1	3–1	0–0	3–0	3–3	1–2	3–2
Newcastle Benfield	1–3	1–0	5–1	2–1	5–0	7–0	3–3	2–0	4–1	1–2	3–0	3–3	1–6		3–0	1–2	2–2	2–0	2–0	3–0	3–0	4–3
Newton Aycliffe	3–0	1–2	1–2	0–3	1–2	2–3	5–2	0–1	2–1	0–3	1–0	0–2	1–1	2–2		0–1	2–4	1–2	0–1	3–0	0–4	0–1
North Shields	3–2	4–0	2–0	3–1	1–0	3–0	1–1	2–0	0–0	1–1	5–1	0–4	4–2	3–1	3–0		1–1	0–1	3–0	3–0	0–3	3–0
Penrith	0–3	3–1	0–3	1–0	3–0	2–4	4–1	0–0	0–2	2–2	2–5	3–0	0–0	2–0	2–1	2–5		0–1	1–1	0–3	2–1	2–2
Shildon	3–4	4–1	4–0	4–2	4–1	0–1	3–2	0–3	3–1	1–2	2–1	2–1	1–1	2–1	3–1	3–2	2–1		5–1	2–0	2–2	1–0
Sunderland RCA	0–4	4–1	1–1	1–0	2–2	3–6	4–0	0–3	1–5	1–1	1–4	3–3	0–2	3–0	1–1	3–0	2–1	1–4		2–3	2–2	2–1
West Allotment Celtic	2–0	6–2	2–1	1–3	2–0	2–2	4–0	2–1	0–5	0–1	1–3	1–2	2–3	3–2	1–2	1–1	1–3	0–3	1–3		1–3	1–1
West Auckland Town	4–1	7–2	7–1	1–2	2–1	2–0	5–0	0–0	4–0	0–2	3–3	1–1	4–0	2–0	0–3	2–0	0–0	3–2	4–0	2–1		6–3
Whitley Bay	3–4	2–1	0–3	0–4	3–0	2–2	5–0	1–0	2–1	1–2	2–1	0–7	2–3	5–3	1–4	2–4	0–3	0–5	2–1	3–2	2–1	

Source: League Official
Legend: Blue = home team win; Yellow = draw; Red = away team win.

=== Stadia ===
Club	Stadium	Capacity
Ashington	Woodhorn Lane	
Bedlington Terriers	Welfare Park	3,000
Billingham Synthonia	Central Avenue	4,200
Bishop Auckland	Heritage Park	1,950
Celtic Nation	Gillford Park	4,000
Consett	Belle View Stadium	3,000
Crook Town	Sir Tom Cowie Millfield Ground	1,500
Dunston UTS	Wellington Road	2,500
Durham City	New Ferens Park	
Guisborough Town	King George V Ground	
Jarrow Roofing Boldon Community Association	Boldon CA Sports Ground	2,000
Marske United	Mount Pleasant	2,500
Morpeth Town	Craik Park	1,000
Newcastle Benfield	Sam Smith's Park	2,000
Newton Aycliffe	Moore Lane Park	1,000
North Shields	Ralph Gardner Park	1,000
Penrith	Frenchfields Stadium	1,500
Shildon	Dean Street	4,700
Sunderland RCA	Meadow Park	1,000
West Allotment Celtic	Whitley Park	1,000
West Auckland Town	Darlington Road	2,000
Whitley Bay	Hillheads Park	4,500

== Division Two ==
Northern Football League Division Two
- Season: 2014–15
- Champions: Seaham Red Star
- Promoted: Norton & Stockton Ancients; Seaham Red Star; Washington
- Matches: 462
- Goals: 1,789 (3.87 per match)

Division Two featured 18 clubs which competed in the division last season, along with four new clubs.

- Clubs relegated from Division One:
  - Billingham Town
  - Hebburn Town
  - Team Northumbria
- Plus:
  - Ryhope Colliery Welfare, promoted from the Northern Football Alliance

=== Division Two table ===
Pos	Team	Pld	W	D	L	GF	GA	GD	Pts	Promotion
1	Seaham Red Star	42	31	5	6	134	54	+80	98	Promoted to Division One
2	Washington	42	28	5	9	123	66	+57	89	Promoted to Division One
3	Norton & Stockton Ancients	42	25	10	7	98	49	+49	85	Promoted to Division One
4	Team Northumbria	42	25	8	9	102	44	+58	83	
5	Hebburn Town	42	24	9	9	100	60	+40	81	
6	Ryhope Colliery Welfare	42	21	11	10	93	57	+36	74	
7	Thornaby	42	21	10	11	84	66	+18	73	
8	Heaton Stannington	42	23	4	15	95	69	+26	70 (Note: Heaton Stannington were deducted four points.)	
9	Whickham	42	20	10	12	80	60	+20	70	
10	Northallerton Town	42	18	9	15	93	64	+29	63	
11	Willington	42	17	9	16	78	77	+1	60	
12	Ryton & Crawcrook Albion	42	17	7	18	75	94	−19	58	
13	Chester-le-Street Town	42	15	12	15	70	60	+10	57	
14	Darlington Railway Athletic	42	17	6	19	81	87	−6	57	
15	South Shields	42	16	5	21	78	74	+4	53	
16	Alnwick Town	42	15	5	22	85	121	−36	50	
17	Birtley Town	42	13	3	26	67	112	−45	42	
18	Billingham Town	42	9	11	22	59	75	−16	38	
19	Stokesley Sports Club	42	10	3	29	72	120	−48	33	
20	Esh Winning	42	9	4	29	47	135	−88	31	
21	Tow Law Town	42	5	8	29	37	114	−77	23	
22	Brandon United	42	4	4	34	38	131	−93	16	

Source: fchd
Rules for classification: 1) points; 2) goal difference; 3) number of goals scored.

=== Results ===
Home \ Away	ALN	BLT	BIR	BRA	CLS	DRA	ESH	HST	HEB	NOR	NSA	RCW	RYC	SRS	SSC	SSH	TNO	THO	TOW	WAS	WHC	WIL
Alnwick Town		4–3	4–1	4–0	0–3	2–3	4–4	2–0	1–5	1–2	4–3	3–1	0–6	4–8	5–1	2–1	4–3	0–1	6–1	2–4	2–3	2–1
Billingham Town	4–1		3–1	1–2	1–1	2–3	3–1	2–4	1–3	4–4	2–3	1–1	0–1	2–3	3–0	1–1	1–3	1–6	4–1	1–3	1–2	2–3
Birtley Town	1–2	2–1		2–0	0–3	2–5	5–0	0–4	2–2	0–4	0–5	1–4	5–1	1–5	3–2	3–1	2–0	1–3	4–1	0–5	2–2	1–1
Brandon United	1–1	2–2	0–3		5–3	1–0	1–4	0–1	1–5	1–2	2–3	2–7	0–1	0–5	2–4	3–5	1–4	0–4	1–1	1–4	0–2	0–1
Chester-le-Street Town	2–2	1–1	2–0	3–1		1–0	3–0	2–3	2–3	3–0	2–2	0–1	3–0	1–1	1–4	2–4	1–0	0–2	2–2	3–3	0–1	5–2
Darlington Railway Athletic	1–0	1–0	2–1	4–2	0–4		2–1	5–1	1–2	2–1	2–2	1–3	0–3	2–2	2–5	1–2	1–4	2–2	7–1	1–2	4–1	2–1
Esh Winning	1–5	0–0	1–4	0–0	0–3	1–4		1–3	1–3	0–10	0–5	1–0	4–2	4–3	2–1	1–2	0–2	2–4	6–1	0–2	0–2	2–1
Heaton Stannington	3–1	1–0	7–0	5–1	0–2	4–0	2–0		2–3	3–0	0–1	2–2	2–2	0–1	2–0	3–0	0–4	4–1	4–0	2–3	2–1	1–1
Hebburn Town	3–0	1–0	4–1	2–1	3–3	1–2	6–0	3–4		2–1	4–0	0–2	3–1	0–2	3–1	2–2	1–3	0–0	3–0	2–4	2–2	2–1
Northallerton Town	8–0	1–2	3–1	5–1	0–1	2–1	4–0	0–1	3–3		2–1	1–1	1–2	0–1	2–1	2–1	1–1	1–1	4–1	4–3	2–2	2–0
Norton & Stockton Ancients	8–0	1–0	7–2	3–0	0–0	2–1	6–0	3–2	0–1	0–0		2–2	5–0	1–0	3–2	2–0	1–1	1–0	1–0	2–1	0–0	3–1
Ryhope Colliery Welfare	2–1	1–2	3–1	4–1	0–1	2–2	5–0	2–1	3–1	6–5	2–0		4–0	2–3	5–1	1–1	0–0	1–2	3–1	1–1	1–1	0–2
Ryton & Crawcrook Albion	2–2	1–0	3–2	3–2	2–2	3–3	3–0	3–2	2–3	1–0	2–3	3–1		2–2	4–2	1–1	1–2	4–3	3–1	4–1	1–1	1–3
Seaham Red Star	9–0	0–0	4–1	2–0	3–1	5–0	3–2	8–3	0–4	4–3	3–1	3–1	6–0		4–2	4–0	0–0	3–0	3–0	5–2	4–2	5–1
Stokesley Sports Club	4–1	2–3	3–4	3–0	2–1	3–2	2–2	1–3	2–5	1–1	3–1	0–2	1–2	1–3		1–4	0–5	0–2	2–1	2–9	2–3	1–4
South Shields	1–2	0–0	1–0	4–0	1–0	3–5	4–1	2–4	0–1	5–3	2–3	1–2	4–0	1–3	3–1		0–2	6–0	5–0	2–1	1–2	2–3
Team Northumbria	2–2	2–0	3–0	5–1	2–0	1–0	5–0	4–0	3–3	0–2	2–2	2–2	6–0	0–2	5–2	1–0		2–3	0–1	2–4	3–0	6–0
Thornaby	2–1	1–1	4–0	2–0	2–2	1–2	1–2	1–2	2–1	3–0	1–1	3–2	1–0	4–1	3–3	3–0	2–3		1–1	0–2	1–1	3–2
Tow Law Town	1–3	1–0	2–3	0–2	1–1	1–2	1–2	0–3	0–2	0–4	0–4	0–3	3–2	0–5	3–2	1–2	1–2	1–1		3–2	0–2	1–1
Washington	3–2	4–0	1–0	5–0	4–0	3–1	9–0	3–2	1–0	1–1	2–2	2–5	3–2	2–0	2–0	3–1	0–4	5–1	2–2		3–0	4–1
Whickham	3–2	0–2	1–4	7–0	1–0	0–0	6–0	2–1	1–1	0–2	1–3	1–2	4–0	2–6	4–0	2–1	1–0	6–2	4–0	0–2		4–1
Willington	6–1	2–2	3–1	5–0	1–0	4–3	3–1	2–2	2–2	2–0	0–2	1–1	3–1	2–0	1–2	2–1	2–3	0–2	1–1	5–3	0–0	

Legend: Blue = home team win; Yellow = draw; Red = away team win.

=== Stadia ===
Club	Stadium	Capacity
Alnwick Town	St James' Park	2,500
Billingham Town	Bedford Terrace	3,000
Birtley Town	Birtley Sports Complex	
Brandon United	Welfare Ground	
Chester-le-Street Town	Moor Park	
Darlington Railway Athletic	Brinkburn Road	
Esh Winning	West Terrace	3,500
Heaton Stannington	Grounsell Park	2,000
Hebburn Town	Hebburn Sports & Social Ground	1,500
Northallerton Town	Calvert Stadium	
Norton & Stockton Ancients	Norton Sports Complex	1,970
Ryhope Colliery Welfare	Ryhope Recreation Park	
Ryton & Crawcrook Albion	Kingsley Park Stadium	1,500
Seaham Red Star	Seaham Town Park	
South Shields	Eden Lane (groundshare with (Peterlee Town)	6,000
Stokesley Sports Club	Stokesley Sports Club	2,000
Team Northumbria	Coach Lane Sports Ground	
Thornaby	Teesdale Park	5,000
Tow Law Town	Ironworks Road	3,000
Washington	Nissan Sports Ground	1,000
Whickham	The Glebe Sports Ground	4,000
Willington	Hall Lane	
