= 2015–16 Northern Football League =

English football league season

The 2015–16 season was the 118th in the history of Northern Football League, a football competition in England. The league has operated two divisions in the English football league system, Division One at step 5, and Division Two at step 6.

== Division One ==
Northern Football League Division One
- Season: 2015–16
- Champions: Shildon
- Relegated: Bedlington Terriers; Norton & Stockton Ancients; Durham City
- Matches: 462
- Goals: 1,738 (3.76 per match)

Division One featured 19 clubs which competed in the division last season, along with three new clubs, promoted from Division Two:

- Norton & Stockton Ancients;
- Seaham Red Star;
- Washington.

Only Bishop Auckland applied for promotion to Step 4. They would have needed to finish in the top three to achieve this.

=== Division One table ===
Pos	Team	Pld	W	D	L	GF	GA	GD	Pts	Relegation
1	Shildon	42	31	3	8	135	37	+98	96	
2	Marske United	42	26	3	13	86	60	+26	81	
3	Guisborough Town	42	22	11	9	95	55	+40	77	
4	Morpeth Town	42	24	5	13	89	64	+25	77	
5	North Shields	42	21	9	12	77	48	+29	72	
6	Newton Aycliffe	42	21	9	12	76	61	+15	72	
7	Consett	42	21	8	13	92	76	+16	71	
8	Bishop Auckland	42	20	7	15	80	79	+1	67	
9	Seaham Red Star	42	18	11	13	90	85	+5	65	
10	Washington	42	20	5	17	82	85	−3	65	
11	Dunston UTS	42	18	8	16	78	64	+14	62	
12	Ashington	42	18	6	18	85	76	+9	60	
13	Sunderland RCA	42	15	9	18	73	89	−16	54	
14	Penrith	42	14	10	18	67	75	−8	52	
15	Jarrow Roofing BCA	42	15	6	21	90	102	−12	51	
16	Whitley Bay	42	15	5	22	75	70	+5	50	
17	West Auckland Town	42	15	5	22	56	84	−28	50	
18	Newcastle Benfield	42	11	11	20	79	96	−17	44	
19	West Allotment Celtic	42	11	7	24	50	105	−55	40	
20	Durham City	42	9	9	24	59	95	−36	36	Relegated to Division Two
21	Norton & Stockton Ancients	42	8	8	26	67	120	−53	32	Relegated to Division Two
22	Bedlington Terriers	42	8	7	27	57	112	−55	31	Relegated to Division Two

Source: fchd
Rules for classification: 1) points; 2) goal difference; 3) number of goals scored.

== Division Two ==
Northern Football League Division Two
- Season: 2015–16
- Champions: South Shields
- Promoted: Chester-le-Street Town; Ryhope Colliery Welfare; South Shields
- Relegated: Birtley Town; Stokesley Sports Club
- Matches: 462
- Goals: 1,707 (3.69 per match)

Division Two featured 19 clubs which competed in the division last season, along with three new clubs:

- Billingham Synthonia, relegated from Division One
- Crook Town, relegated from Division One
- Easington Colliery, promoted from the Wearside Football League

=== Division Two table ===
Pos	Team	Pld	W	D	L	GF	GA	GD	Pts	Promotion or relegation
1	South Shields	42	35	2	5	122	31	+91	107	Promoted to Division One
2	Ryhope Colliery Welfare	42	30	4	8	121	65	+56	94	Promoted to Division One
3	Chester-le-Street Town	42	28	6	8	106	44	+62	90	Promoted to Division One
4	Team Northumbria	42	26	11	5	101	41	+60	89	
5	Billingham Synthonia	42	25	8	9	81	37	+44	83	
6	Easington Colliery	42	22	10	10	106	59	+47	76	
7	Thornaby	42	23	6	13	93	65	+28	75	
8	Northallerton Town	42	21	10	11	81	48	+33	73	
9	Heaton Stannington	42	21	8	13	92	59	+33	71	
10	Hebburn Town	42	17	10	15	78	54	+24	61	
11	Billingham Town	42	18	7	17	80	67	+13	61	
12	Whickham	42	17	8	17	57	68	−11	59	
13	Darlington Railway Athletic	42	18	4	20	86	89	−3	58	
14	Tow Law Town	42	14	11	17	75	82	−7	53	
15	Brandon United	42	14	4	24	77	98	−21	46	
16	Ryton & Crawcrook Albion	42	11	11	20	58	79	−21	44	
17	Alnwick Town	42	12	6	24	66	113	−47	42	
18	Crook Town	42	10	5	27	53	99	−46	35	
19	Willington	42	9	5	28	45	98	−53	32	
20	Esh Winning	42	7	6	29	46	127	−81	27	
21	Birtley Town	42	5	6	31	50	117	−67	21	Relegated to the Northern Alliance
22	Stokesley Sports Club	42	4	2	36	33	167	−134	14	Relegated to the Wearside League

Source: fchd
Rules for classification: 1) points; 2) goal difference; 3) number of goals scored.
