= 2001–02 Northern Football League =

The 2001–02 Northern Football League season was the 104th in the history of Northern Football League, a football competition in England.

== Division One ==
Northern Football League Division One
- Season: 2001–02
- Champions: Bedlington Terriers
- Relegated: Ashington; Thornaby; Seaham Red Star
- Matches: 420
- Goals: 1,408 (3.35 per match)

Division One featured 18 clubs which competed in the division last season, along with three new clubs, promoted from Division Two:

- Ashington
- Thornaby
- Washington Ikeda Hoover

=== League table ===
Pos	Team	Pld	W	D	L	GF	GA	GD	Pts	Promotion or relegation
1	Bedlington Terriers	40	28	8	4	104	35	+69	92	
2	Tow Law Town	40	26	7	7	90	44	+46	85	
3	Dunston Federation Brewery	40	22	9	9	86	53	+33	75	
4	Marske United	40	21	8	11	56	48	+8	71	
5	Whitley Bay	40	20	8	12	78	49	+29	68	
6	Durham City	40	19	11	10	87	62	+25	68	
7	West Auckland Town	40	19	11	10	80	57	+23	68	
8	Brandon United	40	17	8	15	68	53	+15	59	
9	Billingham Town	40	16	9	15	67	66	+1	57	
10	Billingham Synthonia	40	15	10	15	79	75	+4	55	
11	Guisborough Town	40	16	9	15	68	63	+5	54 (Note: Guisborough Town were deducted three points.)	
12	Jarrow Roofing BCA	40	15	8	17	62	74	−12	53	
13	Peterlee Newtown	40	14	10	16	54	60	−6	52	
14	Chester-le-Street Town	40	14	7	19	63	68	−5	49	
15	Washington Ikeda Hoover	40	13	5	22	54	74	−20	44	
16	Consett	40	11	10	19	60	65	−5	43	
17	Newcastle Blue Star	40	13	6	21	56	80	−24	42 (Note: Newcastle Blue Star were deducted three points.)	
18	Morpeth Town	40	10	10	20	48	70	−22	40	
19	Ashington	40	11	8	21	62	98	−36	38 (Note: Ashington were deducted three points.)	Relegated to Division Two
20	Thornaby	40	8	5	27	48	96	−48	29	Relegated to Division Two
21	Seaham Red Star	40	6	5	29	38	118	−80	20 (Note: Seaham Red Star were deducted three points.)	Relegated to Division Two

Source: fchd
Rules for classification: 1) points; 2) goal difference; 3) number of goals scored.

== Division Two ==
Northern Football League Division Two
- Season: 2001–02
- Champions: Shildon
- Promoted: Shildon; Prudhoe Town; Esh Winning
- Matches: 380
- Goals: 1,391 (3.66 per match)

Division Two featured 16 clubs which competed in the division last season, along with four new clubs.

- Clubs relegated from Division One:
  - Crook Town
  - Easington Colliery
  - Hebburn Town
- Plus:
  - Washington Nissan, joined from the Wearside Football League

=== League table ===
Pos	Team	Pld	W	D	L	GF	GA	GD	Pts	Promotion or relegation
1	Shildon	38	28	4	6	135	51	+84	88	Promoted to Division One
2	Prudhoe Town	38	26	7	5	104	32	+72	85	Promoted to Division One
3	Esh Winning	38	27	4	7	93	39	+54	85	Promoted to Division One
4	Penrith	38	26	4	8	101	42	+59	82	
5	Easington Colliery	38	24	5	9	87	47	+40	77	
6	Horden Colliery Welfare	38	21	9	8	87	55	+32	72	
7	Washington Nissan	38	23	3	12	95	68	+27	72	
8	South Shields	38	18	8	12	62	41	+21	62	
9	Northallerton Town	38	17	10	11	59	52	+7	61	
10	Kennek Ryhope CA	38	17	8	13	65	47	+18	59	
11	Crook Town	38	16	6	16	53	60	−7	54	
12	Norton & Stockton Ancients	38	14	7	17	66	71	−5	49	
13	Alnwick Town	38	12	12	14	63	74	−11	48	
14	Hebburn Town	38	12	6	20	52	97	−45	42	
15	Evenwood Town	38	8	5	25	46	96	−50	29	
16	Whickham	38	7	5	26	50	90	−40	26	
17	Willington	38	6	6	26	52	114	−62	24	
18	Murton	38	5	7	26	34	108	−74	22	
19	Eppleton Colliery Welfare	38	6	6	26	42	91	−49	18 (Note: Eppleton Colliery Welfare were deducted six points.)	
20	Shotton Comrades	38	4	4	30	45	116	−71	16	

Source: fchd
Rules for classification: 1) points; 2) goal difference; 3) number of goals scored.
