= 2013–14 Northern Football League =

The 2013–14 season was the 116th in the history of Northern Football League, a football competition in England. The league has operated two divisions in the English football league system, Division One at step 5, and Division Two at step 6.

== Division One ==
Northern Football League Division One
- Season: 2013–14
- Champions: Spennymoor Town
- Promoted: Spennymoor Town
- Relegated: Billingham Town; Hebburn Town; Team Northumbria
- Matches: 506
- Goals: 1,872 (3.7 per match)
- Top goalscorer: Danny Johnson (45)

Division One featured 21 clubs which competed in the division last season, along with two new clubs, promoted from Division Two:

- Crook Town
- Morpeth

From this league, three teams - Bishop Auckland, Celtic Nation and Spennymoor Town - applied for promotion.

=== League table ===
Pos	Team	Pld	W	D	L	GF	GA	GD	Pts	Promotion or relegation
1	Spennymoor Town	44	30	10	4	117	38	+79	100	Promoted to the Northern Premier League
2	Celtic Nation	44	28	11	5	107	41	+66	95	
3	Shildon	44	27	10	7	109	45	+64	91	
4	Guisborough Town	44	26	7	11	100	61	+39	85	
5	West Auckland Town	44	23	15	6	86	58	+28	84	
6	Ashington	44	24	5	15	94	60	+34	77	
7	Dunston UTS	44	20	13	11	84	55	+29	73	
8	Bishop Auckland	44	18	14	12	82	54	+28	68	
9	Durham City	44	18	14	12	85	59	+26	68	
10	Whitley Bay	44	21	4	19	92	73	+19	67	
11	Consett	44	19	9	16	110	83	+27	66	
12	Billingham Synthonia	44	20	5	19	86	83	+3	65	
13	Penrith	44	17	10	17	90	88	+2	61	
14	Newcastle Benfield	44	14	14	16	85	59	+26	56	
15	Crook Town	44	16	8	20	90	111	−21	56	
16	Marske United	44	14	10	20	64	88	−24	52	
17	Morpeth Town	44	13	10	21	73	78	−5	49	
18	Newton Aycliffe	44	14	7	23	80	106	−26	49	
19	Sunderland RCA	44	12	8	24	57	93	−36	44	
20	Bedlington Terriers	44	11	10	23	52	99	−47	43	
21	Team Northumbria	44	10	7	27	60	109	−49	37	Relegated to Division Two
22	Hebburn Town	44	4	7	33	43	124	−81	19	Relegated to Division Two
23	Billingham Town	44	2	2	40	26	207	−181	8	Relegated to Division Two

Source: fchd
Rules for classification: 1) points; 2) goal difference; 3) number of goals scored.

=== Results ===
Home \ Away	ASH	BED	BLS	BLT	BIS	CEL	CON	CRO	DUN	DUR	GUI	HEB	MAR	MOR	NCB	NTA	PEN	SHI	SPE	RCA	TNO	WAT	WHI
Ashington		0–1	3–1	3–1	1–2	4–0	1–1	7–3	4–0	1–1	0–4	3–1	0–2	0–0	3–0	4–0	2–1	0–2	2–3	4–0	4–1	5–1	2–1
Bedlington Terriers	0–3		0–1	3–1	0–3	1–4	0–1	3–4	1–2	3–2	0–3	2–1	1–1	1–0	0–7	2–3	0–0	0–2	1–2	2–4	1–0	0–2	0–3
Billingham Synthonia	2–1	4–0		4–0	0–3	1–5	2–0	6–1	1–3	1–1	1–3	5–1	3–3	2–1	2–1	3–2	5–0	1–5	1–3	1–1	3–0	0–2	6–2
Billingham Town	1–8	0–5	0–3		2–6	1–2	0–4	1–4	1–2	0–3	1–3	2–1	2–3	1–0	0–9	1–6	4–5	0–8	0–7	2–4	0–2	0–2	0–5
Bishop Auckland	0–2	3–1	4–0	6–0		1–0	3–2	8–1	2–0	0–0	1–2	1–1	0–0	2–1	0–0	0–2	4–2	2–3	1–1	1–2	3–0	4–0	1–2
Celtic Nation	2–0	0–0	1–1	11–0	1–1		4–4	4–0	1–0	0–0	3–1	2–0	5–0	3–0	1–0	3–0	3–0	4–3	3–3	1–1	2–1	1–2	3–0
Consett	3–2	10–2	4–3	8–0	3–0	1–2		4–3	0–0	0–1	1–5	3–0	7–1	7–1	1–2	1–1	2–2	0–2	2–1	3–4	4–1	2–5	2–2
Crook Town	2–1	2–2	1–0	6–1	3–1	1–4	2–2		4–3	1–2	3–2	3–1	1–4	2–0	3–0	3–3	1–2	4–2	0–4	3–1	2–2	4–5	3–0
Dunston UTS	1–1	2–2	0–0	6–0	1–2	1–1	1–1	3–2		2–0	2–0	2–0	2–0	5–0	2–2	4–0	5–2	1–1	0–2	1–1	4–1	1–1	0–5
Durham City	2–3	6–1	0–2	5–0	0–2	0–1	3–4	1–0	1–1		2–1	9–3	4–1	1–1	1–1	4–1	3–2	2–3	1–3	3–0	2–0	1–1	1–0
Guisborough Town	1–1	3–0	2–1	5–1	2–2	2–3	2–5	4–2	1–2	1–1		3–0	1–0	2–2	2–1	3–1	4–3	0–0	3–0	2–1	2–0	3–4	3–1
Hebburn Town	1–2	1–2	0–2	0–0	1–1	0–6	0–4	2–2	0–5	3–5	1–1		1–0	1–4	1–3	5–2	0–2	0–0	1–3	0–1	2–3	0–2	2–6
Marske United	0–1	1–1	2–2	0–0	1–1	0–4	3–1	3–2	3–1	0–0	0–4	2–1		3–1	2–2	5–1	1–3	1–2	0–1	3–2	5–1	2–2	3–2
Morpeth Town	0–3	1–1	5–2	9–0	0–0	0–1	3–5	3–1	0–2	2–1	0–1	4–0	1–2		1–1	2–1	1–6	0–4	1–4	5–0	7–2	3–1	2–0
Newcastle Benfield	2–0	3–0	5–1	5–0	2–2	3–1	1–2	6–1	0–0	1–1	1–2	0–1	4–0	2–1		4–2	2–2	0–3	2–2	2–2	4–0	0–0	3–2
Newton Aycliffe	3–4	1–2	4–0	3–0	0–0	0–2	1–1	3–3	0–3	1–5	4–3	3–1	3–2	1–1	4–2		3–3	1–1	0–1	2–1	1–2	4–1	3–1
Penrith	3–0	2–2	1–3	5–1	4–2	2–2	2–0	1–0	0–0	3–1	1–2	4–3	2–2	3–4	2–0	2–4		0–3	2–2	5–1	2–2	4–1	2–3
Shildon	2–3	3–0	6–2	7–0	4–0	1–1	4–2	0–2	1–0	2–3	2–3	6–0	2–1	1–1	1–0	3–0	1–0		1–1	4–0	2–0	0–0	1–1
Spennymoor Town	4–0	5–1	3–1	10–0	1–1	3–0	1–0	5–0	2–0	2–2	1–0	1–0	4–1	1–1	1–0	5–0	4–0	4–2		3–0	4–1	1–1	3–1
Sunderland RCA	1–2	1–3	2–4	3–1	0–4	0–3	4–1	1–2	0–1	0–0	0–3	5–3	2–0	0–0	2–0	0–4	0–1	1–2	1–1		3–0	0–2	2–1
Team Northumbria	1–3	1–1	2–1	5–0	1–1	0–2	2–5	2–1	3–5	0–2	2–2	1–1	0–2	3–1	2–1	4–1	1–2	2–4	0–4	3–1		0–3	3–4
West Auckland Town	2–2	1–1	2–1	6–0	1–0	2–2	2–0	1–1	5–3	1–1	3–2	1–2	3–1	3–2	1–1	3–0	2–0	1–1	3–1	0–0	2–2		1–1
Whitley Bay	1–0	0–3	0–1	5–1	4–1	0–3	2–0	1–1	1–5	4–1	1–2	6–0	5–0	2–0	2–1	3–1	2–0	1–2	1–0	5–2	3–1	0–2	

Source: League Official
Legend: Blue = home team win; Yellow = draw; Red = away team win.

=== Stadia ===
Club	Stadium	Capacity
Ashington	Woodhorn Lane	
Bedlington Terriers	Welfare Park	3,000
Billingham Synthonia	Central Avenue	4,200
Billingham Town	Bedford Terrace	3,000
Bishop Auckland	Heritage Park	1,950
Celtic Nation	Gillford Park	4,000
Consett	Belle View Stadium	3,000
Crook Town	Sir Tom Cowie Millfield Ground	1,500
Dunston UTS	Wellington Road	2,500
Durham City	New Ferens Park	
Guisborough Town	King George V Ground	
Hebburn Town	Hebburn Sports & Social Ground	1,500
Marske United	Mount Pleasant	2,500
Morpeth Town	Craik Park	1,000
Newcastle Benfield	Sam Smith's Park	2,000
Newton Aycliffe	Moore Lane Park	1,000
Penrith	Frenchfields Stadium	1,500
Shildon	Dean Street	4,700
Spennymoor Town	Brewery Field	2,900
Sunderland RCA	Meadow Park	1,000
Team Northumbria	Coach Lane Sports Ground	
West Auckland Town	Darlington Road	2,000
Whitley Bay	Hillheads Park	4,500

== Division Two ==
Northern Football League Division Two
- Season: 2013–14
- Champions: North Shields
- Promoted: Jarrow Roofing BCA; North Shields; West Allotment Celtic
- Matches: 462
- Goals: 1,747 (3.78 per match)

Division Two featured 18 clubs which competed in the division last season, along with four new clubs:

- Heaton Stannington, promoted from the Northern Football Alliance
- Norton & Stockton Ancients, relegated from Division One
- South Shields, relegated from Division One
- Willington, promoted from the Wearside Football League

=== League table ===
Pos	Team	Pld	W	D	L	GF	GA	GD	Pts	Promotion
1	North Shields	42	31	7	4	141	33	+108	100	Promoted to Division One
2	West Allotment Celtic	42	27	9	6	96	58	+38	90	Promoted to Division One
3	Jarrow Roofing BCA	42	26	8	8	118	63	+55	86	Promoted to Division One
4	Seaham Red Star	42	27	7	8	99	45	+54	85 (Note: Seaham Red Star were deducted three points.)	
5	Heaton Stannington	42	25	6	11	88	59	+29	81	
6	Norton & Stockton Ancients	42	20	9	13	83	66	+17	69	
7	Northallerton Town	42	19	9	14	84	67	+17	66	
8	Whickham	42	19	7	16	86	63	+23	64	
9	Washington	42	19	5	18	92	98	−6	62	
10	Tow Law Town	42	17	8	17	91	82	+9	59	
11	Chester-le-Street Town	42	15	13	14	66	72	−6	58	
12	Darlington Railway Athletic	42	15	11	16	81	76	+5	56	
13	Birtley Town	42	16	8	18	62	74	−12	56	
14	Thornaby	42	16	6	20	85	84	+1	54	
15	Willington	42	14	8	20	64	86	−22	50	
16	Whitehaven	42	14	7	21	69	94	−25	49	Resigned to the Wearside League
17	South Shields	42	11	15	16	62	88	−26	48	
18	Alnwick Town	42	10	9	23	63	96	−33	39	
19	Brandon United	42	9	7	26	61	101	−40	34	
20	Stokesley Sports Club	42	8	9	25	61	98	−37	33	
21	Ryton & Crawcrook Albion	42	7	7	28	45	106	−61	28	
22	Esh Winning	42	8	3	31	50	138	−88	27	

Source: fchd
Rules for classification: 1) points; 2) goal difference; 3) number of goals scored.

=== Results ===
Home \ Away	ALN	BIR	BRA	CLS	DRA	ESH	HST	JRO	NSH	NOR	NSA	RYC	SRS	SSH	SSC	THO	TOW	WAS	WAC	WHC	WHA	WIL
Alnwick Town		0–0	5–1	1–1	1–0	4–2	0–2	3–4	2–6	1–0	1–1	3–0	2–6	1–1	1–1	1–3	2–3	1–4	0–4	0–1	0–2	2–2
Birtley Town	5–2		2–1	3–1	1–1	4–0	1–3	1–4	1–2	1–3	0–1	2–0	4–0	2–2	2–1	4–0	2–2	2–1	0–0	6–2	1–1	2–4
Brandon United	1–4	9–0		0–1	2–4	1–1	1–1	0–4	0–5	0–1	1–5	3–1	0–2	1–1	1–1	3–5	0–3	7–0	1–2	1–1	1–5	3–0
Chester-le-Street Town	3–1	3–0	0–0		2–1	2–0	2–1	0–2	2–1	4–2	1–1	1–1	1–6	2–2	0–0	3–0	0–3	0–5	0–0	2–1	1–1	3–0
Darlington Railway Athletic	2–1	1–2	2–3	2–0		10–2	2–0	3–3	2–1	1–2	0–0	2–2	2–1	3–3	4–1	2–3	4–3	2–3	0–4	0–3	6–0	2–2
Esh Winning	2–2	3–1	1–2	1–4	1–5		2–5	0–3	0–6	1–5	3–2	3–1	1–2	1–2	3–1	0–3	2–4	1–5	1–3	3–6	4–1	0–2
Heaton Stannington	4–2	3–0	5–1	1–3	1–3	1–0		4–3	0–0	2–1	1–1	1–1	1–2	2–0	0–1	2–1	1–0	6–1	3–2	2–1	4–2	2–1
Jarrow Roofing BCA	3–0	1–1	2–0	5–1	1–0	10–0	1–0		1–2	4–2	3–1	4–0	3–1	4–2	1–1	2–1	2–4	3–3	0–2	4–3	2–1	1–3
North Shields	3–0	0–0	6–0	3–0	5–1	5–0	3–1	1–0		2–2	3–2	6–1	0–1	4–3	5–0	2–0	1–1	8–0	3–0	5–1	10–0	4–1
Northallerton Town	1–4	3–2	4–0	2–4	1–1	6–0	1–2	1–1	1–3		2–1	2–1	3–0	4–0	2–2	3–2	4–2	2–0	1–3	1–1	4–2	3–3
Norton & Stockton Ancients	4–1	2–0	1–0	3–2	3–0	7–0	1–1	2–3	1–2	2–1		5–0	0–5	2–2	3–2	1–0	2–1	0–2	3–3	0–3	3–2	2–1
Ryton & Crawcrook Albion	1–2	0–1	4–1	2–2	0–1	2–0	0–4	1–4	1–4	0–3	2–1		0–1	1–2	1–4	0–2	2–0	1–7	2–4	1–1	2–1	3–4
Seaham Red Star	5–0	4–2	1–2	3–1	1–1	1–0	1–2	1–1	3–0	1–1	2–1	3–0		5–0	2–0	5–2	3–0	4–1	2–2	1–2	1–0	3–0
South Shields	0–3	2–1	1–1	4–3	3–3	2–3	0–2	1–5	1–3	2–2	3–2	2–4	1–1		2–1	1–1	4–3	1–2	2–2	1–1	2–1	0–0
Stokesley Sports Club	2–1	0–1	3–0	2–3	1–2	1–2	2–4	3–6	3–3	2–1	0–1	2–2	0–1	1–3		3–1	1–2	3–1	2–2	0–3	2–2	3–5
Thornaby	2–2	2–0	3–1	1–1	3–0	3–0	4–5	1–1	1–4	1–2	2–2	0–1	4–0	1–2	4–2		6–3	2–4	3–1	3–1	5–0	3–1
Tow Law Town	3–1	2–3	1–3	1–1	5–0	2–0	4–5	1–3	0–0	3–1	3–5	1–1	2–3	1–1	5–0	4–2		3–0	3–4	2–2	1–3	2–1
Washington	1–2	2–2	4–3	3–1	0–3	4–3	3–1	4–2	0–9	3–0	1–4	4–0	1–1	1–1	5–1	4–2	2–3		2–3	0–5	3–1	0–0
West Allotment Celtic	5–3	2–1	2–1	2–2	2–1	1–1	0–1	3–5	0–0	3–0	5–0	2–1	2–1	3–2	3–2	2–1	3–2	1–0		3–1	2–0	3–0
Whickham	3–0	0–1	4–1	1–1	2–0	4–0	2–0	3–3	0–1	0–2	0–1	4–1	2–3	0–1	4–1	4–0	2–0	1–0	2–3		1–2	2–5
Whitehaven	4–2	1–2	1–3	2–1	1–1	1–0	4–3	2–1	0–4	0–0	3–5	2–1	1–1	4–0	4–1	1–1	2–3	3–2	3–1	2–3		0–1
Willington	1–1	2–0	2–1	2–1	1–1	2–3	1–2	0–3	0–6	0–2	1–1	5–0	0–7	2–0	1–2	4–1	1–2	0–4	0–2	0–3	3–1	

Source: League Official
Legend: Blue = home team win; Yellow = draw; Red = away team win.

=== Stadia ===
Club	Stadium	Capacity
Alnwick Town	St James' Park	2,500
Birtley Town	Birtley Sports Complex	
Brandon United	Welfare Ground	
Chester-le-Street Town	Moor Park	
Darlington Railway Athletic	Brinkburn Road	
Esh Winning	West Terrace	3,500
Heaton Stannington	Grounsell Park	2,000
Jarrow Roofing Boldon Community Association	Boldon CA Sports Ground	2,000
North Shields	Ralph Gardner Park	1,000
Northallerton Town	Calvert Stadium	
Norton & Stockton Ancients	Norton Sports Complex	1,970
Ryton & Crawcrook Albion	Kingsley Park Stadium	1,500
Seaham Red Star	Seaham Town Park	
South Shields	Eden Lane (groundshare with Peterlee Town)	6,000
Stokesley Sports Club	Stokesley Sports Club	2,000
Thornaby	Teesdale Park	5,000
Tow Law Town	Ironworks Road	3,000
Washington	Nissan Sports Ground	1,000
West Allotment Celtic	Whitley Park	1,000
Whickham	The Glebe Sports Ground	4,000
Whitehaven	County Ground	2,000
Willington	Hall Lane	
