= 2006–07 Northern Football League =

The 2006–07 Northern Football League season was the 109th in the history of Northern Football League, a football competition in England.

== Division One ==
Northern Football League Division One
- Season: 2006–07
- Champions: Whitley Bay
- Promoted: Newcastle Blue Star
- Relegated: Horden Colliery Welfare; Darlington Railway Athletic
- Matches: 462
- Goals: 1,571 (3.4 per match)

Division One featured 18 clubs which competed in the division last season, along with four new clubs.

- Clubs promoted from Division Two:
  - Consett
  - Darlington Railway Athletic
  - Northallerton Town
- Plus:
  - Bishop Auckland, relegated from the Northern Premier League

=== League table ===
Pos	Team	Pld	W	D	L	GF	GA	GD	Pts	Promotion or relegation
1	Whitley Bay	42	28	8	6	104	45	+59	92	
2	Billingham Town	42	28	8	6	98	47	+51	92	
3	Sunderland Nissan	42	28	6	8	96	41	+55	90	
4	Consett	42	23	10	9	89	51	+38	79	
5	Newcastle Benfield (Bay Plastics)	42	21	11	10	79	45	+34	74	
6	West Auckland Town	42	22	8	12	88	61	+27	74	
7	Dunston Federation Brewery	42	19	16	7	67	48	+19	73	
8	Durham City	42	20	12	10	87	62	+25	72	
9	Shildon	42	21	9	12	80	57	+23	72	
10	Morpeth Town	42	19	9	14	87	70	+17	66	
11	Newcastle Blue Star	42	17	7	18	71	60	+11	58	Promoted to the Northern Premier League Division One North
12	Tow Law Town	42	15	11	16	68	72	−4	56	
13	Northallerton Town	42	16	6	20	76	82	−6	54	
14	Billingham Synthonia	42	13	14	15	61	71	−10	53	
15	Jarrow Roofing BCA	42	13	7	22	68	101	−33	46	
16	Bishop Auckland	42	11	10	21	59	86	−27	43	
17	Chester-le-Street Town	42	10	9	23	51	80	−29	39	
18	West Allotment Celtic	42	9	11	22	62	80	−18	38	
19	Ashington	42	9	7	26	46	87	−41	34	
20	Bedlington Terriers	42	7	8	27	47	99	−52	26 (Note: Bedlington Terriers were deducted three points.)	
21	Horden Colliery Welfare	42	6	10	26	46	107	−61	25 (Note: Horden Colliery Welfare were deducted three points.)	Relegated to Division Two
22	Darlington Railway Athletic	42	6	5	31	41	119	−78	23	Relegated to Division Two

Source: fchd
Rules for classification: 1) points; 2) goal difference; 3) number of goals scored.

== Division Two ==
Northern Football League Division Two
- Season: 2006–07
- Champions: Spennymoor Town
- Promoted: Spennymoor Town; Seaham Red Star; Washington
- Relegated: Alnwick Town
- Matches: 420
- Goals: 1,457 (3.47 per match)

Division Two featured 16 clubs which competed in the division last season, along with five new clubs.

- Clubs relegated from Division One:
  - Brandon United
  - Esh Winning
  - Thornaby
- Plus:
  - Stokesley Sports Club, joined from the Wearside Football League
  - Team Northumbria, joined from the Northern Football Alliance

Also, Kennek Ryhope CA changed name to Sunderland RCA.

=== League table ===
Pos	Team	Pld	W	D	L	GF	GA	GD	Pts	Promotion
1	Spennymoor Town	40	29	9	2	85	33	+52	96	Promoted to Division One
2	Seaham Red Star	40	26	8	6	99	52	+47	86	Promoted to Division One
3	Washington	40	24	9	7	78	36	+42	81	Promoted to Division One
4	South Shields	40	23	7	10	89	58	+31	76	
5	Marske United	40	20	13	7	68	44	+24	73	
6	Norton & Stockton Ancients	40	21	5	14	86	58	+28	68	
7	Penrith	40	18	10	12	81	52	+29	64	
8	Stokesley Sports Club	40	18	8	14	83	70	+13	62	
9	Guisborough Town	40	17	4	19	65	71	−6	55	
10	Hebburn Town	40	15	9	16	68	71	−3	54	
11	Team Northumbria	40	16	5	19	57	70	−13	53	
12	Ryton	40	12	14	14	71	60	+11	50	
13	Thornaby	40	13	9	18	60	69	−9	48	
14	Crook Town	40	13	7	20	72	88	−16	46	
15	Whickham	40	12	9	19	71	76	−5	45	
16	Esh Winning	40	12	7	21	63	83	−20	43	
17	Brandon United	40	12	7	21	64	87	−23	43	
18	North Shields	40	13	4	23	49	72	−23	43	
19	Sunderland RCA	40	12	4	24	50	85	−35	37 (Note: Sunderland RCA were deducted three points.)	
20	Prudhoe Town	40	8	4	28	48	104	−56	28	
21	Alnwick Town	40	8	4	28	50	118	−68	28	Relegated to the Northern Football Alliance

Source: fchd
Rules for classification: 1) points; 2) goal difference; 3) number of goals scored.
