= 2009–10 Northern Football League =

The 2009–10 Northern Football League season was the 112th in the history of Northern Football League, a football competition in England.

== Division One ==
Northern Football League Division One
- Season: 2009–10
- Champions: Spennymoor Town
- Relegated: Chester-le-Street Town; Horden Colliery Welfare; Morpeth Town
- Matches: 462
- Goals: 1,703 (3.69 per match)
- Top goalscorer: Nathan Fisher (Chester-le-Street Town) (34 goals)

Division One featured 19 clubs which competed in the division last season, along with three new clubs, promoted from Division Two:

- Esh Winning
- Horden Colliery Welfare
- Norton & Stockton Ancients

Also, Dunston Federation changed name to Dunston UTS.

=== League table ===
Pos	Team	Pld	W	D	L	GF	GA	GD	Pts	Promotion or relegation
1	Spennymoor Town	42	31	7	4	118	33	+85	100	
2	Shildon	42	27	6	9	102	60	+42	87	
3	Whitley Bay	42	25	8	9	111	48	+63	83	
4	Dunston UTS	42	24	10	8	96	41	+55	82	
5	Newcastle Benfield	42	23	9	10	89	45	+44	78	
6	Ashington	42	22	8	12	79	59	+20	74	
7	Bedlington Terriers	42	21	8	13	71	51	+20	71	
8	Norton & Stockton Ancients	42	20	7	15	82	84	−2	67	
9	Tow Law Town	42	20	6	16	80	85	−5	66	
10	Consett	42	19	7	16	71	73	−2	64	
11	South Shields	42	19	6	17	83	87	−4	63	
12	Billingham Synthonia	42	17	8	17	76	75	+1	59	
13	Bishop Auckland	42	17	7	18	81	89	−8	58	
14	Penrith	42	17	7	18	75	71	+4	55 (Note: Penrith deducted three points for fielding an ineligible player.)	
15	West Allotment Celtic	42	16	6	20	68	84	−16	54	
16	West Auckland Town	42	15	5	22	83	92	−9	50	
17	Ryton	42	13	5	24	62	86	−24	44	
18	Esh Winning	42	11	6	25	57	94	−37	39	
19	Billingham Town	42	10	5	27	54	110	−56	35	
20	Chester-le-Street Town	42	10	3	29	68	115	−47	33	Relegated to Division Two
21	Morpeth Town	42	7	6	29	49	110	−61	27	Relegated to Division Two
22	Horden Colliery Welfare	42	6	4	32	48	111	−63	22	Relegated to Division Two

Source: fchd
Rules for classification: 1) points; 2) goal difference; 3) number of goals scored.

=== Results ===
Home \ Away	ASH	BED	BLS	BLT	BIS	CLS	CON	DUN	ESH	HCW	MOR	NCB	NSA	PEN	RYT	SHI	SSH	SPE	TOW	WAC	WAT	WHI
Ashington		1–1	1–2	7–1	3–1	2–0	1–2	1–1	4–0	1–1	4–3	0–3	2–1	1–1	1–2	2–1	4–2	0–1	1–3	2–0	4–3	0–0
Bedlington Terriers	0–1		1–0	5–1	3–2	1–1	0–0	0–3	2–1	3–1	3–1	0–0	3–1	1–2	2–0	1–1	2–1	2–1	2–0	1–2	4–0	4–1
Billingham Synthonia	0–2	2–0		0–0	3–1	2–0	1–2	0–3	2–2	5–3	5–2	5–0	2–2	2–2	1–1	1–2	1–2	2–3	2–1	3–2	4–2	1–1
Billingham Town	1–4	0–4	2–3		2–1	2–4	1–5	2–4	3–2	3–2	2–0	0–3	1–0	1–4	0–2	4–0	2–4	0–6	1–2	0–2	1–6	1–6
Bishop Auckland	2–4	2–1	3–0	1–1		3–0	2–0	1–4	2–1	2–3	3–3	1–2	1–1	3–3	2–0	0–1	5–1	2–1	3–4	2–4	0–3	2–7
Chester-le-Street Town	3–4	3–2	0–2	1–5	1–4		1–3	1–3	1–5	5–4	4–1	1–1	3–0	2–6	3–4	2–2	0–1	0–1	6–4	1–4	5–3	0–3
Consett	1–1	1–0	1–3	2–2	0–3	3–1		0–2	4–1	2–2	2–2	0–4	0–1	2–2	3–1	1–6	0–2	0–5	1–2	1–0	2–4	1–3
Dunston UTS	1–2	2–0	5–0	4–0	2–2	3–2	0–1		4–0	3–1	1–1	0–0	0–2	2–0	1–0	2–4	2–0	0–0	5–0	2–2	5–1	3–2
Esh Winning	1–0	1–2	2–2	2–1	1–1	1–2	1–3	1–0		2–0	2–2	1–2	1–2	0–2	0–2	0–2	2–4	1–4	1–4	0–1	0–3	0–3
Horden Colliery Welfare	2–4	1–3	0–2	0–1	0–2	2–1	2–6	2–2	1–2		0–1	2–0	2–4	0–1	1–0	0–3	0–2	0–1	3–4	2–1	0–3	0–5
Morpeth Town	1–2	0–3	2–0	0–1	0–5	1–2	0–5	1–4	0–1	3–0		0–5	1–2	2–1	1–3	2–2	1–2	1–5	0–3	1–2	1–0	0–3
Newcastle Benfield	1–0	1–1	2–1	5–1	1–2	0–1	3–2	0–2	1–1	3–0	4–1		0–2	3–0	2–2	3–1	2–0	1–3	6–0	7–0	2–0	1–3
Norton & Stockton Ancients	2–4	0–1	3–1	2–0	2–3	3–1	0–2	1–7	2–3	6–0	2–1	1–1		2–0	2–2	0–3	3–1	2–2	0–3	4–3	3–3	2–1
Penrith	1–1	2–4	1–4	1–0	1–4	4–2	1–3	1–3	4–0	2–1	5–0	0–1	1–2		2–1	0–1	0–1	0–0	2–1	3–1	0–2	2–0
Ryton	0–3	0–3	4–2	1–0	5–1	4–2	1–3	0–2	1–3	3–0	0–3	1–1	2–3	2–0		0–6	0–2	1–2	1–3	1–2	4–2	2–3
Shildon	5–1	2–0	2–2	2–1	2–1	3–2	1–2	2–1	2–1	4–1	4–2	0–2	5–1	1–4	3–0		8–1	0–4	4–1	2–1	2–1	3–1
South Shields	0–3	6–1	3–2	5–2	8–1	1–0	0–1	1–0	2–4	2–2	1–1	1–6	3–3	0–1	3–3	4–1		1–3	2–1	3–1	0–1	3–1
Spennymoor Town	0–0	2–0	4–1	4–1	2–1	3–2	4–1	1–1	6–0	4–2	6–1	4–0	4–1	3–1	5–0	1–2	3–1		2–0	6–0	0–0	1–0
Tow Law Town	2–0	2–4	2–1	1–1	0–1	2–0	0–0	2–2	3–2	1–3	3–1	2–0	2–5	4–3	2–1	1–1	1–1	4–3		0–3	2–1	1–1
West Allotment Celtic	0–1	0–0	0–1	1–0	1–1	3–1	1–2	1–3	2–2	1–0	6–1	0–2	0–4	0–5	2–1	3–3	5–1	1–3	5–4		1–5	1–2
West Auckland Town	3–0	2–0	0–2	1–5	1–2	0–5	5–1	2–2	1–4	4–2	0–3	1–6	2–3	3–3	3–1	1–3	2–2	0–5	3–1	0–2		0–2
Whitley Bay	4–0	1–1	4–1	1–1	7–0	5–1	1–0	1–0	5–2	4–0	2–1	2–2	7–0	5–1	1–3	2–0	6–3	0–0	1–2	1–1	3–1	

Legend: Blue = home team win; Yellow = draw; Red = away team win.

== Division Two ==
Northern Football League Division Two
- Season: 2009–10
- Champions: Stokesley
- Promoted: Jarrow Roofing; Stokesley; Sunderland RCA
- Matches: 380
- Goals: 1,367 (3.6 per match)
- Top goalscorer: Andy Jennings (Stokesley) (37 goals)

Division Two featured 16 clubs which competed in the division last season, along with four new clubs:

- Gillford Park, promoted from the Northern Football Alliance
- Newton Aycliffe, promoted from the Wearside Football League
- Northallerton Town, relegated from Division One
- Seaham Red Star, relegated from Division One

Also, Stokesley Sports Club changed name to Stokesley.

=== League table ===
Pos	Team	Pld	W	D	L	GF	GA	GD	Pts	Promotion
1	Stokesley	38	29	4	5	121	45	+76	91	Promoted to Division One
2	Sunderland RCA	38	24	8	6	85	29	+56	80	Promoted to Division One
3	Jarrow Roofing BCA	38	25	5	8	107	60	+47	80	Promoted to Division One
4	Marske United	38	22	9	7	77	34	+43	75	
5	Guisborough Town	38	21	9	8	76	43	+33	72	
6	North Shields	38	17	12	9	66	52	+14	63	
7	Whitehaven	38	17	9	12	80	60	+20	60	
8	Northallerton Town	38	16	9	13	74	63	+11	57	
9	Newton Aycliffe	38	15	12	11	64	53	+11	57	
10	Whickham	38	17	7	14	51	51	0	55 (Note: Whickham deducted three points for fielding an ineligible player.)	
11	Gillford Park	38	15	5	18	67	74	−7	50	
12	Seaham Red Star	38	15	4	19	70	72	−2	49	
13	Crook Town	38	12	9	17	63	90	−27	45	
14	Team Northumbria	38	12	6	20	58	64	−6	42	
15	Brandon United	38	12	6	20	64	92	−28	42	
16	Hebburn Town	38	11	8	19	61	98	−37	41	
17	Thornaby	38	8	10	20	52	80	−28	34	
18	Washington	38	9	6	23	44	77	−33	33	
19	Darlington Railway Athletic	38	4	8	26	46	115	−69	20	
20	Birtley Town	38	4	4	30	41	115	−74	16	

Source: fchd
Rules for classification: 1) points; 2) goal difference; 3) number of goals scored.

=== Results ===
Home \ Away	BIR	BRA	CRO	DRA	GIL	GUI	HEB	JRO	MAR	NTA	NOR	NSH	SRS	STO	RCA	TNO	THO	WAS	WHC	WHA
Birtley Town		1–3	2–3	2–2	1–3	0–5	2–0	2–5	2–4	0–1	0–1	0–3	1–6	1–6	0–3	1–2	2–2	2–1	2–5	1–1
Brandon United	3–1		0–0	5–5	1–3	1–2	4–3	2–2	2–1	1–0	2–3	0–4	2–0	2–5	1–4	5–0	3–5	0–1	0–3	0–3
Crook Town	7–1	1–1		3–1	4–0	1–2	0–1	0–5	0–4	1–1	2–2	2–4	2–1	2–2	0–5	0–1	2–1	1–0	1–3	1–1
Darlington Railway Athletic	1–4	1–2	2–1		2–1	1–1	0–1	1–3	1–5	3–5	0–3	1–5	4–4	1–4	1–4	2–2	1–1	2–2	0–2	1–7
Gillford Park	7–1	4–2	2–0	4–1		1–1	0–5	0–2	2–3	2–2	1–4	2–1	1–1	5–3	1–0	2–0	4–2	0–1	2–0	1–1
Guisborough Town	6–0	2–1	0–0	5–0	3–2		2–4	4–1	1–2	2–1	0–0	1–0	1–1	1–2	1–1	3–1	3–0	3–1	1–0	1–3
Hebburn Town	3–0	0–3	5–5	2–1	2–1	0–3		1–3	0–4	1–1	3–3	1–1	1–2	1–3	1–8	2–2	4–1	0–3	0–4	2–1
Jarrow Roofing BCA	2–1	7–2	14–1	7–0	1–0	2–5	2–2		1–5	3–1	2–1	2–4	3–1	1–4	1–2	2–3	3–2	2–1	0–0	5–0
Marske United	3–1	5–0	3–2	4–1	3–1	2–0	2–0	0–1		1–0	1–1	1–1	3–1	1–2	0–0	1–0	3–0	1–1	2–0	2–2
Newton Aycliffe	2–1	2–1	10–2	3–2	1–3	0–0	3–2	1–2	1–1		3–1	3–3	1–4	1–4	1–0	0–0	0–1	3–0	0–1	2–0
Northallerton Town	3–0	2–2	1–2	2–1	5–0	0–4	3–0	3–4	1–2	3–0		1–2	1–2	0–4	1–1	2–1	2–2	2–1	0–0	2–2
North Shields	3–2	3–2	1–2	0–1	2–0	1–1	1–1	0–4	1–0	2–2	4–1		6–0	1–2	0–0	1–0	2–0	1–0	1–1	1–2
Seaham Red Star	2–0	1–2	3–1	4–1	1–0	1–2	7–3	0–1	1–0	1–1	0–2	2–3		0–4	1–2	2–1	1–0	1–3	2–0	1–3
Stokesley	3–1	7–1	3–1	3–0	1–0	2–0	1–2	2–2	2–0	1–1	5–1	5–1	1–4		1–0	3–0	4–2	7–1	3–1	3–1
Sunderland RCA	3–0	1–0	0–0	5–0	5–2	3–0	8–0	3–3	1–0	0–2	3–1	2–0	1–0	3–2		0–4	1–0	2–0	3–0	0–0
Team Northumbria	5–2	4–0	4–1	1–2	3–3	1–2	4–0	0–1	3–3	0–2	1–2	0–1	5–2	1–3	0–2		0–1	1–2	2–1	1–0
Thornaby	1–1	1–1	0–3	2–0	3–0	3–3	2–2	2–3	0–0	2–4	2–2	1–2	3–2	1–5	1–5	1–1		2–0	0–2	2–1
Washington	0–2	1–3	0–4	3–2	2–3	1–2	1–5	0–1	1–1	0–1	2–2	2–2	3–1	1–7	1–2	1–3	2–1		0–1	2–3
Whickham	1–0	1–3	3–2	1–1	2–1	0–1	1–0	2–1	0–2	2–2	1–2	0–1	2–6	1–1	1–0	3–1	3–1	0–0		1–6
Whitehaven	4–1	3–1	1–3	2–0	2–3	3–2	6–1	2–3	0–2	0–0	2–2	4–3	2–1	2–1	2–2	3–0	3–1	1–3	1–2	

Legend: Blue = home team win; Yellow = draw; Red = away team win.
