= 2005–06 Northern Football League =

The 2005–06 Northern Football League season was the 108th in the history of Northern Football League, a football competition in England.

== Division One ==
Northern Football League Division One
- Season: 2005–06
- Champions: Newcastle Blue Star
- Relegated: Brandon United; Esh Winning
- Matches: 420
- Goals: 1,398 (3.33 per match)

Division One featured 18 clubs which competed in the division last season, along with three new clubs, promoted from Division Two:

- Newcastle Blue Star
- Washington Nissan, who also changed name to Sunderland Nissan
- West Allotment Celtic

Also, Newcastle Benfield Saints changed name to Newcastle Benfield (Bay Plastics).

=== League table ===
Pos	Team	Pld	W	D	L	GF	GA	GD	Pts	Promotion or relegation
1	Newcastle Blue Star	40	28	6	6	87	34	+53	90	
2	Bedlington Terriers	40	22	8	10	86	61	+25	74	
3	Dunston Federation Brewery	40	20	11	9	82	45	+37	71	
4	Billingham Town	40	18	13	9	81	54	+27	67	
5	West Auckland Town	40	20	7	13	76	53	+23	67	
6	Morpeth Town	40	19	10	11	68	50	+18	67	
7	Billingham Synthonia	40	17	12	11	65	58	+7	63	
8	Chester-le-Street Town	40	18	9	13	64	64	0	63	
9	Newcastle Benfield (Bay Plastics)	40	18	8	14	81	62	+19	62	
10	Whitley Bay	40	17	9	14	68	51	+17	60	
11	Durham City	40	15	13	12	58	44	+14	58	
12	Tow Law Town	40	15	9	16	63	65	−2	54	
13	West Allotment Celtic	40	14	8	18	77	83	−6	50	
14	Sunderland Nissan	40	14	8	18	64	73	−9	50	
15	Jarrow Roofing BCA	40	14	7	19	65	76	−11	49	
16	Ashington	40	13	9	18	64	60	+4	48	
17	Thornaby	40	14	6	20	72	85	−13	48	Demoted to Division Two
18=	Horden Colliery Welfare	40	12	11	17	55	65	−10	47	
18=	Shildon	40	11	14	15	55	65	−10	47	
20	Esh Winning	40	3	7	30	32	103	−71	16	Relegated to Division Two
21	Brandon United	40	4	3	33	35	147	−112	15	Relegated to Division Two

Source: fchd
Rules for classification: 1) points; 2) goal difference; 3) number of goals scored.

== Division Two ==
Northern Football League Division Two
- Season: 2005–06
- Champions: Consett
- Promoted: Consett; Darlington Railway Athletic; Northallerton Town
- Relegated: Peterlee Newtown
- Matches: 380
- Goals: 1,334 (3.51 per match)

Division Two featured 14 clubs which competed in the division last season, along with six new clubs.

- Clubs relegated from Division One:
  - Consett
  - Guisborough Town
  - Peterlee Newtown
- Plus:
  - Darlington Railway Athletic, joined from the Wearside Football League
  - Ryton, joined from the Northern Football Alliance
  - Spennymoor Town, new club formed by merger of Evenwood Town and folded Spennymoor United

=== League table ===
Pos	Team	Pld	W	D	L	GF	GA	GD	Pts	Promotion
1	Consett	38	33	3	2	134	31	+103	102	Promoted to Division One
2	Northallerton Town	38	25	8	5	86	30	+56	83	Promoted to Division One
3	Darlington Railway Athletic	38	23	5	10	83	46	+37	74	Promoted to Division One
4	Penrith	38	20	10	8	73	46	+27	70	
5	Crook Town	38	19	11	8	95	43	+52	68	
6	Washington	38	17	10	11	68	54	+14	61	
7	Norton & Stockton Ancients	38	17	9	12	83	73	+10	60	
8	Spennymoor Town	38	16	11	11	70	66	+4	59	
9	Whickham	38	16	10	12	84	64	+20	58	
10	Marske United	38	12	13	13	62	69	−7	49	
11	Ryton	38	13	9	16	51	65	−14	48	
12	North Shields	38	13	8	17	57	67	−10	47	
13	Prudhoe Town	38	12	10	16	45	49	−4	46	
14	Seaham Red Star	38	11	12	15	60	59	+1	45	
15	Hebburn Town	38	12	9	17	46	67	−21	45	
16	Alnwick Town	38	12	1	25	62	93	−31	34 (Note: Alnwick Town were deducted three points.)	
17	Kennek Ryhope CA	38	5	13	20	41	76	−35	28	
18	South Shields	38	10	4	24	51	95	−44	28 (Note: South Shields were deducted six points.)	
19	Guisborough Town	38	7	7	24	35	86	−51	28	
20	Peterlee Newtown	38	5	1	32	48	155	−107	16	Relegated to the Northern Football Alliance

Source: fchd
Rules for classification: 1) points; 2) goal difference; 3) number of goals scored.
