= 2002–03 Northern Football League =

The 2002–03 Northern Football League season was the 105th in the history of Northern Football League, a football competition in England.

== Division One ==
Northern Football League Division One
- Season: 2002–03
- Champions: Brandon United
- Relegated: Prudhoe Town; Consett; Newcastle Blue Star
- Matches: 420
- Goals: 1,367 (3.25 per match)

Division One featured 18 clubs which competed in the division last season, along with three new clubs, promoted from Division Two:

- Esh Winning
- Prudhoe Town
- Shildon

Also, Washington Ikeda Hoover changed name to Washington.

=== League table ===
Pos	Team	Pld	W	D	L	GF	GA	GD	Pts	Promotion or relegation
1	Brandon United	40	26	10	4	77	28	+49	88	
2	Bedlington Terriers	40	24	9	7	96	42	+54	81	
3	Billingham Town	40	23	5	12	100	56	+44	74	
4	Billingham Synthonia	40	21	8	11	73	47	+26	71	
5	Durham City	40	21	5	14	77	54	+23	68	
6	Shildon	40	19	7	14	83	74	+9	64	
7	Guisborough Town	40	19	6	15	58	43	+15	63	
8	Dunston Federation Brewery	40	17	11	12	52	43	+9	62	
9	Jarrow Roofing BCA	40	17	7	16	64	67	−3	58	
10	Whitley Bay	40	17	8	15	68	62	+6	56 (Note: Whitley Bay were deducted three points.)	
11	Morpeth Town	40	15	11	14	67	67	0	56	
12	Washington	40	16	8	16	52	60	−8	56	
13	West Auckland Town	40	16	9	15	87	74	+13	54 (Note: West Auckland Town were deducted three points.)	
14	Chester-le-Street Town	40	14	11	15	60	63	−3	53	
15	Tow Law Town	40	14	8	18	58	63	−5	50	
16	Marske United	40	13	10	17	64	74	−10	49	
17	Esh Winning	40	15	7	18	54	84	−30	49 (Note: Esh Winning were deducted three points.)	
18	Peterlee Newtown	40	8	9	23	44	89	−45	33	
19	Prudhoe Town	40	7	10	23	52	89	−37	31	Relegated to Division Two
20	Consett	40	7	8	25	44	83	−39	29	Relegated to Division Two
21	Newcastle Blue Star	40	3	9	28	37	105	−68	18	Relegated to Division Two

Source: fchd
Rules for classification: 1) points; 2) goal difference; 3) number of goals scored.

== Division Two ==
Northern Football League Division Two
- Season: 2002–03
- Champions: Penrith
- Promoted: Penrith; Horden Colliery Welfare; Thornaby
- Relegated: Eppleton Colliery Welfare
- Matches: 380
- Goals: 1,396 (3.67 per match)

Division Two featured 17 clubs which competed in the division last season, along with four new clubs, relegated from Division One:

- Ashington
- Seaham Red Star
- Thornaby

=== League table ===
Pos	Team	Pld	W	D	L	GF	GA	GD	Pts	Promotion or relegation
1	Penrith	38	26	10	2	102	28	+74	88	Promoted to Division One
2	Horden Colliery Welfare	38	26	7	5	83	38	+45	85	Promoted to Division One
3	Thornaby	38	25	8	5	84	32	+52	83	Promoted to Division One
4	Seaham Red Star	38	26	4	8	91	45	+46	82	
5	Ashington	38	22	13	3	101	37	+64	79	
6	Washington Nissan	38	21	5	12	102	57	+45	68	
7	Easington Colliery	38	19	5	14	83	72	+11	62	
8	South Shields	38	16	11	11	86	70	+16	59	
9	Northallerton Town	38	17	5	16	72	58	+14	56	
10	Whickham	38	14	9	15	68	72	−4	51	
11	Kennek Ryhope CA	38	12	9	17	63	67	−4	45	
12	Hebburn Town	38	13	5	20	55	66	−11	44	
13	Evenwood Town	38	12	6	20	58	95	−37	42	
14	Murton	38	10	8	20	55	95	−40	38	
15	Alnwick Town	38	10	8	20	50	69	−19	35 (Note: Alnwick Town were deducted three points.)	
16	Crook Town	38	11	8	19	64	92	−28	35 (Note: Crook Town were deducted six points.)	
17	Shotton Comrades	38	8	5	25	46	103	−57	29	
18	Norton & Stockton Ancients	38	5	9	24	38	81	−43	24	
19	Willington	38	6	5	27	50	132	−82	23	
20	Eppleton Colliery Welfare	38	8	6	24	45	87	−42	15 (Note: Eppleton Colliery Welfare were deducted 15 points.)	Relegated to the Northern Football Alliance

Source: fchd
Rules for classification: 1) points; 2) goal difference; 3) number of goals scored.
