= 2004–05 Northern Football League =

The 2004–05 Northern Football League season was the 107th in the history of Northern Football League, a football competition in England.

== Division One ==
Northern Football League Division One
- Season: 2004–05
- Champions: Dunston Federation Brewery
- Relegated: Consett; Peterlee Newtown; Guisborough Town
- Matches: 420
- Goals: 1,412 (3.36 per match)

Division One featured 18 clubs which competed in the division last season, along with three new clubs, promoted from Division Two:

- Ashington
- Consett
- Newcastle Benfield Saints

=== League table ===
Pos	Team	Pld	W	D	L	GF	GA	GD	Pts	Promotion or relegation
1	Dunston Federation Brewery	40	28	11	1	83	25	+58	95	
2	Billingham Synthonia	40	21	12	7	71	41	+30	75	
3	Bedlington Terriers	40	20	11	9	73	40	+33	71	
4	Newcastle Benfield Saints	40	19	12	9	85	52	+33	69	
5	Whitley Bay	40	20	8	12	80	62	+18	68	
6	Durham City	40	19	6	15	67	53	+14	63	
7	Billingham Town	40	17	9	14	79	53	+26	60	
8	Chester-le-Street Town	40	15	15	10	69	61	+8	60	
9	Horden Colliery Welfare	40	16	9	15	68	63	+5	57	
10	Ashington	40	15	10	15	75	67	+8	55	
11	Shildon	40	16	7	17	73	71	+2	55	
12	Jarrow Roofing BCA	40	15	8	17	84	75	+9	53	
13	Morpeth Town	40	15	8	17	62	69	−7	53	
14	Esh Winning	40	12	14	14	58	52	+6	50	
15	Thornaby	40	14	10	16	57	69	−12	49 (Note: Thornaby were deducted three points.)	
16	Tow Law Town	40	13	4	23	53	87	−34	43	
17	West Auckland Town	40	10	9	21	66	98	−32	39	
18	Brandon United	40	10	9	21	67	101	−34	39	
19	Consett	40	9	9	22	40	68	−28	36	Relegated to Division Two
20	Peterlee Newtown	40	8	7	25	53	136	−83	31	Relegated to Division Two
21	Guisborough Town	40	8	12	20	49	69	−20	30 (Note: Guisborough Town were deducted six points.)	Relegated to Division Two

Source: fchd
Rules for classification: 1) points; 2) goal difference; 3) number of goals scored.

== Division Two ==
Northern Football League Division Two
- Season: 2004–05
- Champions: West Allotment Celtic
- Promoted: West Allotment Celtic; Washington Nissan; Newcastle Blue Star
- Relegated: Easington Colliery; Willington
- Matches: 380
- Goals: 1,413 (3.72 per match)

Division Two featured 15 clubs which competed in the division last season, along with five new clubs.

- Clubs relegated from Division One:
  - Marske United
  - Penrith
  - Washington
- Plus:
  - North Shields, joined from the Wearside Football League
  - West Allotment Celtic, joined from the Northern Football Alliance

=== League table ===
Pos	Team	Pld	W	D	L	GF	GA	GD	Pts	Promotion or relegation
1	West Allotment Celtic	38	29	5	4	121	41	+80	92	Promoted to Division One
2	Washington Nissan	38	28	5	5	121	41	+80	86 (Note: Washington Nissan were deducted three points.)	Promoted to Division One
3	Newcastle Blue Star	38	27	5	6	95	39	+56	86	Promoted to Division One
4	Prudhoe Town	38	24	7	7	91	45	+46	79	
5	Northallerton Town	38	25	4	9	87	43	+44	79	
6	Norton & Stockton Ancients	38	20	6	12	72	65	+7	63 (Note: Norton & Stockton Ancients were deducted three points.)	
7	Crook Town	38	19	5	14	80	65	+15	62	
8	Penrith	38	18	7	13	80	51	+29	61	
9	Whickham	38	17	3	18	83	78	+5	54	
10	Seaham Red Star	38	15	6	17	59	67	−8	51	
11	North Shields	38	14	8	16	55	54	+1	50	
12	Alnwick Town	38	13	9	16	65	64	+1	48	
13	South Shields	38	13	8	17	73	66	+7	44 (Note: South Shields were deducted three points.)	
14	Washington	38	11	6	21	47	71	−24	39	
15	Marske United	38	11	5	22	50	78	−28	38	
16	Evenwood Town	38	11	5	22	52	94	−42	35 (Note: Evenwood Town were deducted three points.)	Merged into Spennymoor Town
17	Kennek Ryhope CA	38	9	7	22	59	93	−34	34	
18	Hebburn Town	38	8	7	23	50	94	−44	31	
19	Easington Colliery	38	7	7	24	49	97	−48	28	Relegated to the Northern Football Alliance
20	Willington	38	2	3	33	24	167	−143	9	Relegated to the Wearside Football League

Source: fchd
Rules for classification: 1) points; 2) goal difference; 3) number of goals scored.
