= 2003–04 Northern Football League =

The 2003–04 Northern Football League season was the 106th in the history of Northern Football League, a football competition in England.

== Division One ==
Northern Football League Division One
- Season: 2003–04
- Champions: Dunston Federation Brewery
- Relegated: Washington; Marske United; Penrith
- Matches: 420
- Goals: 1,473 (3.51 per match)

Division One featured 18 clubs which competed in the division last season, along with three new clubs, promoted from Division Two:

- Horden Colliery Welfare
- Penrith
- Thornaby

=== League table ===
Pos	Team	Pld	W	D	L	GF	GA	GD	Pts	Promotion or relegation
1	Dunston Federation Brewery	40	25	9	6	76	32	+44	84	
2	Durham City	40	23	9	8	90	53	+37	78	
3	Bedlington Terriers	40	25	5	10	104	58	+46	77 (Note: Bedlington Terriers were deducted three points.)	
4	Shildon	40	21	11	8	82	52	+30	71 (Note: Shildon were deducted three points.)	
5	Billingham Town	40	20	10	10	83	62	+21	70	
6	Jarrow Roofing BCA	40	19	6	15	98	90	+8	63	
7	Peterlee Newtown	40	17	9	14	82	67	+15	60	
8	Brandon United	40	17	7	16	71	77	−6	58	
9	Billingham Synthonia	40	16	9	15	75	65	+10	57	
10	Whitley Bay	40	16	6	18	71	76	−5	54	
11	Morpeth Town	40	16	8	16	70	59	+11	53 (Note: Morpeth were deducted three points.)	
12	Thornaby	40	14	12	14	56	61	−5	51 (Note: Thornaby were deducted three points.)	
13	West Auckland Town	40	14	8	18	63	96	−33	50	
14	Guisborough Town	40	13	10	17	59	57	+2	49	
15	Esh Winning	40	13	9	18	52	68	−16	48	
16	Tow Law Town	40	13	8	19	63	78	−15	47	
17	Chester-le-Street Town	40	14	4	22	74	85	−11	46	
18	Horden Colliery Welfare	40	11	11	18	58	81	−23	44	
19	Washington	40	10	6	24	55	97	−42	36	Relegated to Division Two
20	Marske United	40	8	9	23	46	76	−30	33	Relegated to Division Two
21	Penrith	40	8	8	24	45	83	−38	32	Relegated to Division Two

Source: fchd
Rules for classification: 1) points; 2) goal difference; 3) number of goals scored.

== Division Two ==
Northern Football League Division Two
- Season: 2003–04
- Champions: Ashington
- Promoted: Ashington; Newcastle Benfield Saints; Consett
- Relegated: Shotton Comrades
- Matches: 380
- Goals: 1,323 (3.48 per match)

Division Two featured 16 clubs which competed in the division last season, along with four new clubs.

- Clubs relegated from Division One:
  - Consett
  - Newcastle Blue Star
  - Prudhoe Town
- Plus:
  - Newcastle Benfield Saints, joined from the Northern Football Alliance

=== League table ===
Pos	Team	Pld	W	D	L	GF	GA	GD	Pts	Promotion or relegation
1	Ashington	38	27	7	4	91	28	+63	88	Promoted to Division One
2	Newcastle Benfield Saints	38	26	7	5	106	42	+64	85	Promoted to Division One
3	Consett	38	25	8	5	84	35	+49	83	Promoted to Division One
4	Newcastle Blue Star	38	24	6	8	87	53	+34	75 (Note: Newcastle Blue Star were deducted three points.)	
5	Washington Nissan	38	21	6	11	81	47	+34	66 (Note: Washington Nissan were deducted three points.)	
6	Prudhoe Town	38	18	4	16	73	70	+3	58	
7	Northallerton Town	38	15	12	11	73	57	+16	57	
8	Hebburn Town	38	16	6	16	64	58	+6	54	
9	Kennek Ryhope CA	38	15	8	15	65	55	+10	53	
10	Whickham	38	14	10	14	66	57	+9	52	
11	Alnwick Town	38	15	6	17	50	59	−9	51	
12	South Shields	38	14	8	16	61	68	−7	50	
13	Seaham Red Star	38	11	10	17	73	78	−5	43	
14	Evenwood Town	38	13	4	21	43	58	−15	43	
15	Murton	38	11	9	18	58	68	−10	42	Demoted to the Northern Football Alliance
16	Crook Town	38	11	8	19	61	79	−18	41	
17	Willington	38	11	5	22	50	104	−54	38	
18	Norton & Stockton Ancients	38	10	5	23	49	89	−40	35	
19	Easington Colliery	38	8	3	27	41	119	−78	27	
20	Shotton Comrades	38	6	6	26	47	99	−52	24	Relegated to the Wearside Football League

Source: fchd
Rules for classification: 1) points; 2) goal difference; 3) number of goals scored.
