= 1924–25 Northern Football League =

The 1924–25 Northern Football League season was the 32nd in the history of the Northern Football League, a football competition in Northern England.

== Clubs ==
Northern League
- Season: 1924–25
- Champions: Tow Law Town
- Matches: 210
- Goals: 756 (3.6 per match)

The league featured 15 clubs which competed in the last season, no new clubs joined the league this season.

=== League table ===
Pos	Team	Pld	W	D	L	GF	GA	GR	Pts	Promotion or relegation
1	Tow Law Town	28	20	3	5	73	27	2.704	43	
2	Crook Town	28	19	4	5	70	29	2.414	42	
3	Stockton	28	15	7	6	54	33	1.636	37	
4	Bishop Auckland	28	14	4	10	58	37	1.568	32	
5	Cockfield	28	10	11	7	50	42	1.190	31	
6	Willington	28	12	3	13	67	57	1.175	27	
7	Ferryhill Athletic	28	12	3	13	70	60	1.167	27	
8	South Bank	28	11	5	12	44	42	1.048	27	
9	Loftus Albion	28	12	3	13	50	72	0.694	27	
10	Scarborough	28	11	2	15	50	45	1.111	24	
11	Stanley United	28	10	4	14	33	60	0.550	24	
12	Langley Park	28	9	5	14	31	49	0.633	23	
13	Esh Winning	28	8	5	15	42	63	0.667	21	
14	Darlington Railway Athletic	28	7	6	15	32	71	0.451	20	Left the league
15	Eston United	28	6	3	19	32	69	0.464	15	

Rules for classification: 1) points; 2) goal ratio.
