= Lee Tucker (footballer, born 1971) =

English footballer

Personal information
- Full name: Lee Derek Tucker
- Date of birth: 14 September 1971 (age 55)
- Place of birth: Middlesbrough, England
- Position: Forward

Youth career
- Middlesbrough

Senior career*
Years	Team	Apps	(Gls)
1989–1991	Middlesbrough	0	(0)
1991–1992	Darlington	5	(0)
- Guisborough Town
- * Club domestic league appearances and goals

Lee Derek Tucker (born 14 September 1971) is an English Sporting director for Rochester New York FC and former professional footballer who played in the Football League as a forward for Darlington. He later played non-league football for Guisborough Town. In 2019 Tucker took charge of a new men's team at Norton and Stockton Ancients. In their first season the team won promotion from the Wearside Football League Division Two.

In 2021, Tucker took over as the Sporting director of Rochester New York FC following a four-year hiatus.
