= Darlington Railway Athletic F.C. =

Association football club in England

Coordinates: 54.536551°N 1.5752251°W

Darlington Railway Athletic
- Full name: Darlington Railway Athletic Football Club
- Nicknames: R. A., Railwaymen
- Ground: Brinkburn Road, Darlington
- League: North Riding League Premier Division
- 2025–26: North Riding League Premier Division, 3rd of 12
Home colours

Darlington Railway Athletic Football Club is a football club based in Darlington, England. They are currently members of the North Riding League Premier Division and play at Brinkburn Road.

== History ==
The club was formed after World War I and initially played in the Darlington & District League. They joined the Northern League in 1919, but left at the end of the 1924–25 season after finishing second-from-bottom, returning to the Darlington & District League. They were league champions in 1932–33 and 1963–64, and League Cup winners in 1950–51. They did the double of league and League Cup in 1967–68. The club subsequently joined the Teesside Football League. In 1969–70 the club won the North Riding Cup. They finished bottom of the Teesside League in 1986–87, but were runners-up in 1988–89.

In 1990 the club joined Division Two of the Wearside League. A third-place finish in their first season saw them promoted to Division One, but they folded at the end of the 1991–92 season. After reforming, the club rejoined the Darlington & District League, winning it in 1998–99. They subsequently transferred to the Auckland & District League, which they won in 2000–01. The club were then promoted to the Wearside League, which was now operating with a single division. They won the League Cup in 2002–03, and were league champions in 2004–05, earning promotion to Division Two of the Northern League. Their first season in Division Two saw them finish third, earning promotion to Division One. However, they finished bottom of Division One in 2006–07 and were relegated back to Division Two. In 2017–18 the club finished second-from-bottom of Division Two and were relegated to the Wearside League.

After finishing bottom of the Wearside League Premier Division in 2024–25, Railway Athletic moved to the Premier Division of the North Riding League.

=== Season-by-season ===
Season	Division	Pl	W	D	L	F	A	Pts	Pos	Notes
1919–20	Northern League	26	10	4	12	45	58	24	9/14	
1920–21	Northern League	26	13	2	11	43	39	28	6/14	
1921–22	Northern League	26	7	6	13	45	58	20	11/14	
1922–23	Northern League	26	10	3	13	35	40	23	9/14	
1923–24	Northern League	28	8	6	14	45	69	22	12/15	
1924–25	Northern League	28	7	6	15	32	71	20	14/15	Left league
1925-26	Darlington & District League									
1926-27	Darlington & District League									
1927-28	Darlington & District League									
1928-29	Darlington & District League									
1929-30	Darlington & District League									
1930-31	Darlington & District League									
1931-32	Darlington & District League									
1932-33	Darlington & District League								1	Champions
1933-34	Darlington & District League									
1934-35	Darlington & District League									
1935-36	Darlington & District League									
1936-37	Darlington & District League									
1937-38	Darlington & District League									
1938-39	Darlington & District League									
1946-47	Darlington & District League									
1947-48	Darlington & District League									
1948-49	Darlington & District League									
1949-50	Darlington & District League									
1950-51	Darlington & District League									
1951-52	Darlington & District League									
1952-53	Darlington & District League									
1953-54	Darlington & District League									
1954-55	Darlington & District League									
1955-56	Darlington & District League									
1956-57	Darlington & District League									
1957-58	Darlington & District League									
1958-59	Darlington & District League									
1959-60	Darlington & District League									
1960-61	Darlington & District League									
1961-62	Darlington & District League									
1962-63	Darlington & District League									
1963-64	Darlington & District League								1	Champions
1964-65	Darlington & District League									
1965-66	Darlington & District League									
1966-67	Darlington & District League									
1967–68	Darlington & District League								1	Champions, promoted
1968–69	Teesside Football League	28								
1969–70	Teesside Football League	30								
1970–71	Teesside Football League	30								
1971–72	Teesside Football League	30	9	10	11			28	10/16	
1972–73	Teesside Football League	32	19	7	6			45	3/17	
1973–74	Teesside Football League	34								
1974–75	Teesside Football League	34								
1975–76	Teesside Football League	32								
1976–77	Teesside Football League	34								
1977–78	Teesside Football League	34								
1978–79	Teesside Football League	34	20	7	7	65	35	47	5/18	
1979–80	Teesside Football League	34	20	5	9	68	38	45	5/18	
1980–81	Teesside Football League	34	20	7	7	71	37	47	4/18	
1981–82	Teesside Football League	30	9	7	14	52	56	25	11/16	
1982–83	Teesside Football League	30	15	4	11	55	48	34	6/16	
1983–84	Teesside Football League	34	13	6	15	55	53	32	9/18	
1984–85	Teesside Football League									
1985–86	Teesside Football League	34	5	11	18	35	76	21	16/18	
1986–87	Teesside Football League	34	2	5	27	26	103	9	18/18	
1987–88	Teesside Football League	34	13	13	8	57	45	39	8/18	
1988–89	Teesside Football League	34	22	4	4	76	28	48	2/16	
1989–90	Teesside Football League									Transferred to Wearside League
1990–91	Wearside League Division Two	33	17	9	7	70	38	60	3/12	Promoted
1991–92	Wearside League Division One	30	4	9	17	36	66	18	14/16	Folded, resigned from league
1993–94	Darlington & District League									
1994–95	Darlington & District League									
1995–96	Darlington & District League									
1996–97	Darlington & District League									
1997–98	Darlington & District League									
1998–99	Darlington & District League								1	Champions, transferred to Auckland & District League
1999–2000	Auckland & District League								3	
2000–01	Auckland & District League								1	Champions, promoted
2001–02	Wearside League	32	21	4	7	75	43	67	3/17	
2002–03	Wearside League	34	15	10	9	75	40	55	7/18	
2003–04	Wearside League	34	16	9	9	75	44	57	5/18	
2004–05	Wearside League	36	28	4	4	111	28	88	1/19	Champions, promoted
2005–06	Northern League Division Two	38	23	5	10	83	46	74	3/20	Promoted
2006–07	Northern League Division One	42	6	5	31	41	119	23	22/22	Relegated
2007–08	Northern League Division Two	38	10	6	22	51	78	36	18/20	
2008–09	Northern League Division Two	38	10	2	26	45	80	32	18/20	
2009–10	Northern League Division Two	38	4	8	26	46	115	20	19/20	
2010–11	Northern League Division Two	38	12	3	23	54	92	39	15/20	
2011–12	Northern League Division Two	42	22	7	13	84	68	73	5/22	
2012–13	Northern League Division Two	42	22	12	8	82	57	78	5/22	
2013–14	Northern League Division Two	42	15	11	16	81	76	56	12/22	
2014–15	Northern League Division Two	42	17	6	19	81	87	57	14/22	
2015–16	Northern League Division Two	42	18	4	20	86	89	58	13/22	
2016–17	Northern League Division Two	40	9	4	27	61	126	31	19/21	
2017–18	Northern League Division Two	40	9	4	27	41	90	31	20/21	Relegated
2018–19	Wearside League	30	9	2	19	57	87	30	12/16	
2019–20	Wearside League First Division	24	5	6	13	45	58	21	12/16	Season abandoned due to COVID-19 pandemic
2020–21	Wearside League First Division	14	6	2	6	22	26	20	7/18	Season abandoned due to COVID-19 pandemic
2021–22	Wearside League First Division	34	9	8	17	41	54	35	13/18	
2022–23	Wearside League Premier Division	32	12	8	12	79	66	44	9/17	
2023–24	Wearside League Premier Division	34	12	3	19	56	74	39	13/18	
2024–25	Wearside League Premier Division	32	6	7	19	27	71	25	17/17	Transferred to North Riding Premier Division
2025–26	North Riding League Premier Division	22	13	4	5	44	25	43	3/12	

== Honours ==
- Wearside League
  - Champions 2004–05
  - League Cup winners 2002–03
- Auckland & District League
  - Champions 2000–01
- Darlington & District League
  - Champions 1932–33, 1963–64, 1967–68, 1998–99
  - League Cup winners 1950–51, 1967–68
- Durham Amateur Cup
  - Winners 1977–75
- Sunderland Shipowners Cup
  - Winners 2004–05
- North Riding Cup
  - Winners 1969–70
- Darlington Charity Cup
  - Winners 2000-01
- Sacriston Aged Miners Cup
  - Winners 2000-01
- Auckland Charity Cup
  - Winners 2000-01

== Records ==
- Best FA Cup performance: Preliminary round, 2007–08
- Best FA Vase performance: Second round, 1978–79
- Biggest home win: 11–1 vs Glaxo, 6 January 2001; 11–1 vs Ferryhill Athletic, 2 April 2005
- Biggest away win: 11–1 vs Byers Green 20 November 1999; 11–1 vs Wearhead United 28 October 2000
- Heaviest home defeat: 1–7 vs Whitehaven 23 January 2010
- Heaviest away defeat: 1–9 vs Morpeth Town 5 January 2013
- Record attendance: 585 vs Darlington 1883, friendly, 7 August 2012

== See also ==
- Darlington Railway Athletic F.C. players
- Darlington Railway Athletic F.C. managers
