= 1912–13 Northern Football League =

The 1912–13 Northern Football League season was the 24th in the history of the Northern Football League, a football competition in Northern England.

== Clubs ==
Northern League
- Season: 1912–13
- Champions: Esh Winning
- Matches: 132
- Goals: 441 (3.34 per match)

The league featured 10 clubs which competed in the last season, along with two new clubs:

- Craghead United
- Esh Winning Rangers

=== League table ===
Pos	Team	Pld	W	D	L	GF	GA	GR	Pts
1	Esh Winning Rangers	22	13	6	3	40	22	1.818	32
2	Willington	22	12	4	6	43	26	1.654	28
3	South Bank	22	12	4	6	36	23	1.565	28
4	Crook Town	22	11	5	6	33	23	1.435	27
5	Craghead United	22	11	3	8	51	26	1.962	25
6	Stockton	22	10	4	8	34	27	1.259	24
7	Darlington St Augustine's	22	9	5	8	33	28	1.179	23
8	Eston United	22	9	5	8	44	43	1.023	23
9	Stanley United	22	6	4	12	29	54	0.537	16
10	Bishop Auckland	22	5	5	12	37	52	0.712	15
11	Grangetown Athletic	22	5	2	15	29	57	0.509	12
12	Leadgate Park	22	3	5	14	32	60	0.533	11
