= 1913–14 Northern Football League =

The 1913–14 Northern Football League season was the 25th in the history of the Northern Football League, a football competition in Northern England.

== Clubs ==
Northern League
- Season: 1913–14
- Champions: Willington
- Matches: 156
- Goals: 473 (3.03 per match)

The league featured 12 clubs which competed in the last season, along with one new club:

- Redcar

Also Esh Winning Rangers became Esh Winning.

=== League table ===
Pos	Team	Pld	W	D	L	GF	GA	GR	Pts	Promotion or relegation
1	Willington	24	20	2	2	52	17	3.059	42	
2	South Bank	24	16	4	4	47	22	2.136	36	
3	Crook Town	24	11	5	8	41	27	1.519	27	
4	Darlington St Augustine's	24	11	5	8	35	29	1.207	27	
5	Craghead United	24	11	3	10	42	36	1.167	25	Left the league
6	Stockton	24	8	8	8	41	35	1.171	24	
7	Bishop Auckland	24	9	4	11	38	35	1.086	22	
8	Stanley United	24	7	7	10	33	36	0.917	21	
9	Eston United	24	8	5	11	31	38	0.816	21	
10	Leadgate Park	24	6	7	11	30	46	0.652	19	
11	Esh Winning	24	5	8	11	27	42	0.643	18	
12	Grangetown Athletic	24	5	7	12	26	52	0.500	17	
13	Redcar	24	4	5	15	30	58	0.517	13	Left the league
