= Esh Winning F.C. =

Association football club in England

Coordinates: 54°45′44.61″N 1°43′14.97″W

Esh Winning
- Full name: Esh Winning Football Club
- Nicknames: Esh, Stags
- Founded: 1967
- Ground: West Terrace, Esh Winning
- Capacity: 3,500
- Chairman: Charles Ryan
- Manager: Johnathan Swift
- League: Wearside League Premier Division
- 2025–26: Northern League Division Two, 22nd of 22 (relegated)
Home colours	Away colours

Esh Winning Football Club is a football club based in Esh Winning, near Durham, in County Durham, England. They are currently members of the Wearside League Premier Division and play at West Terrace.

== History ==
The original Esh Winning club was established in 1889 as Esh Winning Rangers. After playing in local leagues, they joined the Northern League in 1912, winning it at the first attempt, also winning the Durham Benevolent Bowl. At the end of the season they were renamed Esh Winning. The club's second season in the league saw them finish eleventh. After World War I the club continued in the Northern League, finishing bottom of the table in 1926–27, 1931–32 and 1933–34. In 1934 the club were forced to fold as they were unable to pay rent to the parish council; they resigned from the league on 5 October after four matches and their fixtures were taken over by West Auckland Town.

The modern club was established in 1967 as Esh Winning Pineapple. They joined Division Three of the Durham and District Sunday League, and were promoted to Division Two at the end of the 1970–71 season. The club won the Guards Cup in 1971–72 and the Division Two title in 1972–73. After winning the Stafferi Cup in 1974–75 and the Guards Cup again in 1975–76, they won successive league titles in 1978–79 and 1979–81. In 1981 the club joined the Northern Alliance. After a sixth-place finish in their first season in the league, they were promoted to Division Two of the Northern League, dropping "Pineapple" from their name.

Esh Winning remained in Division Two of the Northern League for twenty seasons, finishing bottom of the division in 1985–86 and 1989–90. In 2001–02 they finished third and were promoted to Division One, where they remained until being relegated back to Division Two at the end of the 2005–06 season. In 2007–08 the club won the Ernest Armstrong Memorial Cup. In 2008–09 another third-place finish in Division Two saw them promoted to Division One for a second time. However, they were relegated back to Division Two at the end of the 2010–11 season. They finished bottom of Division Two for a third time in 2013–14.

After finishing bottom of Division Two again in 2025–26 Esh Winning were relegated to the Premier Division of the Wearside League.

=== Season-by-season record ===
Season	League									Notes
Season	Division	Pl	W	D	L	F	A	Pts	Pos	Notes
1981–82	Northern Alliance	34	17	7	10	58	41	41	6/18	Promoted
1982–83	Northern League Division Two	30	10	7	13	42	60	37	6/11	
1983–84	Northern League Division Two	34	13	10	11	49	55	49	9/18	
1984–85	Northern League Division Two	34	12	6	16	46	64	39	11/18	Three points deducted
1985–86	Northern League Division Two	38	5	9	24	44	99	24	20/20	
1986–87	Northern League Division Two	36	8	7	21	44	81	31	17/19	
1987–88	Northern League Division Two	34	14	7	13	47	49	49	5/18	
1988–89	Northern League Division Two	38	10	8	20	42	68	38	15/20	
1989–90	Northern League Division Two	38	7	5	26	40	91	23	20/20	Three points deducted
1990–91	Northern League Division Two	36	19	6	11	77	57	63	7/19	
1991–92	Northern League Division Two	38	13	9	16	76	74	48	11/20	
1992–93	Northern League Division Two	38	13	4	21	70	82	43	13/20	
1993–94	Northern League Division Two	36	12	7	17	50	72	43	12/19	
1994–95	Northern League Division Two	38	15	7	16	78	88	52	13/20	
1995–96	Northern League Division Two	36	13	7	16	80	75	46	11/19	
1996–97	Northern League Division Two	36	7	3	26	44	100	21	18/19	Three points deducted
1997–98	Northern League Division Two	36	11	9	16	58	79	42	16/19	
1998–99	Northern League Division Two	36	9	10	17	59	73	37	15/19	
1999–00	Northern League Division Two	36	11	2	23	59	81	35	15/19	
2000–01	Northern League Division Two	36	19	7	10	79	44	64	5/19	
2001–02	Northern League Division Two	38	27	4	7	93	39	85	3/20	Promoted
2002–03	Northern League Division One	40	14	8	18	51	84	47	17/21	Three points deducted
2003–04	Northern League Division One	40	13	9	18	52	68	48	15/21	
2004–05	Northern League Division One	40	12	14	14	58	52	50	14/21	
2005–06	Northern League Division One	40	3	7	30	32	103	16	20/21	Relegated
2006–07	Northern League Division Two	40	12	7	21	63	83	43	16/21	
2007–08	Northern League Division Two	38	15	7	16	73	58	52	13/20	
2008–09	Northern League Division Two	38	21	8	7	89	59	77	3/20	Promoted
2009–10	Northern League Division One	42	11	6	25	57	94	39	18/22	
2010–11	Northern League Division One	42	4	4	34	40	121	16	21/22	Relegated
2011–12	Northern League Division Two	42	20	6	16	95	74	66	11/22	
2012–13	Northern League Division Two	42	10	3	29	49	108	30	20/22	
2013–14	Northern League Division Two	42	8	3	31	50	138	27	22/22	
2014–15	Northern League Division Two	42	9	4	29	47	135	31	20/22	
2015–16	Northern League Division Two	42	7	6	29	46	127	27	20/22	

== Ground ==
The original Esh Winning played at the Stags Head Recreation Ground. The ground's record attendance of over 5,000 was set in 1910 for a match against Newcastle United reserves and equalled in 1921 when the club lost 5–4 to Bishop Auckland in the FA Amateur Cup quarter final.

The modern club bought the welfare grounds in Waterhouses (a village to the south-west of Esh Winning) from the National Coal Board when the mine was about to be closed down. The West Terrace ground was subsequently developed, including a stand with five rows of seating and two covered standing areas.

== Honours ==
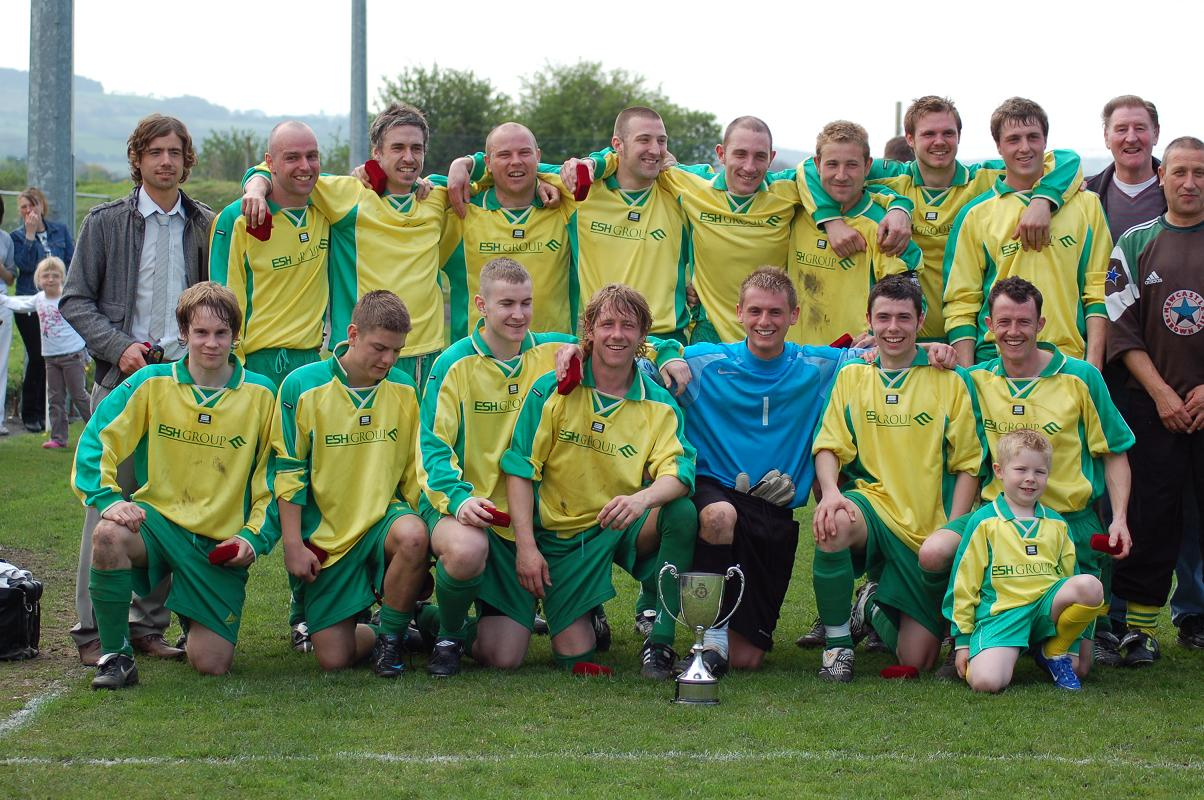
Ernest Armstrong Cup Winners 2008

- Northern League
  - Champions 1912–13
  - Ernest Armstrong Memorial Cup winners 2007–08
- Durham and District Sunday League
  - Champions 1978–79, 1979–80
  - Division Two champions 1972–73
  - Guards Cup winners 1971–72, 1975–76
  - Stafferi Cup winners 1974–75
- Durham Benevolent Bowl
  - Winners 1912–13

== Records ==
- Best FA Cup performance: Second qualifying round, 1990–91, 2004–05
- Best FA Vase performance: Second round, 1983–84, 1992–93, 2001–02, 2004–05, 2012–13
- Best FA Amateur Cup performance: Quarter-finals, 1920–21
- Record attendance:
  - Original club: 5,000 vs Newcastle United Reserves, 1910; vs Bishop Auckland, FA Amateur Cup quarter-final, 1921
  - Modern club: 1,500 vs Liverpool Fantail, FA Sunday Cup, 1982
- Most appearances: Neil McLeary, 194
- Most goals: Alan Dodsworth, over 250

== See also ==
- Esh Winning F.C. players
