= Celtic Nation F.C. =

Coordinates: 54°52′37.790″N 2°54′58.018″W

Celtic Nation
- Full name: Celtic Nation Football Club
- Founded: 2004
- Dissolved: 2015
- Ground: Gillford Park
- Capacity: 4,000
- League: Northern League Division One
- 2014–15: Northern League Division One, 21st
Home colours

Old Gillford Park club badge before the club's name change.

Celtic Nation Football Club (/ˈkɛltɪk ˈneɪʃən/) was an English association football club based in Carlisle, Cumbria. The club were members of Division One of the Northern League and played at Gillford Park.

== History ==
The club was established in 2004 and was originally known as Gillford Park Spartans and joined Division Two of the Northern Alliance in 2005. They finished second in the first season in the division, and were promoted to Division One. In 2006 the club changed its name to Gillford Park, winning Division One of the Northern Alliance at the first attempt, earning promotion to the Premier Division.

After finishing third in the Premier Division in 2007–08, the club finished second the following season, and were promoted to Division Two of the Northern League. In 2009–10 and 2010–11 the club finished eleventh in Division Two, before finishing second in 2011–12 and earning promotion to Division One.

In 2012 the club adopted the name Celtic Nation, and also attracted sponsorship from Frank Lynch, a Scottish millionaire based in America. The extra money allowed the club to sign several ex-professional players, including Paul Arnison, Adam Boyd and Graeme Lee.

Former Newcastle United assistant manager Mick Wadsworth was appointed manager in late April 2013, with Wadsworth revealing that he had turned down an assistant manager role at a League One side to take up the challenge at Celtic Nation. Wadsworth resigned after 10 matches in charge, and was succeeded as manager by Willie McStay.

After financial support for the club was withdrawn, Wille McStay and the majority of the playing staff left the club. At one point in the summer of 2014 the club had only four registered players.

Former Newcastle United, Barrow and Carlisle United midfielder Mark Boyd took on the role of player/manager of Celtic Nation appointing Nation forward, Jonny Allan, as assistant.

On 25 April 2015, Nation confirmed that they had resigned from the Northern League and would fold due to financial problems and losing the lease of Gillford Park to Northern Football Alliance Premier Division neighbours Carlisle City. Three days later Celtic Nation played their last ever match against North Shields, which ended in a 1–0 defeat.

== Colours ==
Celtic Nation played in green and white shirts, white shorts and green and white socks. Their away strip was yellow shirts, black shorts and yellow and black socks.

== Honours ==
- Northern Alliance (as Gillford Park F.C.)
  - Division One champions 2006–07
  - Challenge Cup winners 2008–09
  - Combination Cup winners 2006–07
- Cumberland Senior Cup
  - Winners 2014 (as Celtic Nation F.C.)
