= Team Northumbria F.C. =

Association football club in England

Coordinates: 55°00′23.52″N 1°34′06.01″W

Team Northumbria
- Full name: Team Northumbria Football Club
- Nickname: Team North / TN
- Founded: 1999
- Ground: Coach Lane Sports Ground, Newcastle upon Tyne
- Manager: Colin Stromsoy
- League: BUCS Premier North League
- Website: https://northumbriasport.com/sport/football/team-northumbria-men-s-football
Home colours

Team Northumbria Football Club is a football club based in Newcastle upon Tyne. They are the football team of Northumbria University and currently play in the BUCS Premier North League.

== History ==
The club was founded in 1999 as Northumbria University Football Club and joined Division Two of the Northern Alliance. In 2001–02 they were Division Two runners-up, earning promotion to Division One. The club went on to finish as runners-up in Division One the following season, and were promoted to the Premier Division. In 2003 they were renamed Team Northumbria. The club's first season in the Premier Division saw them finish as runners-up. Following a third-place finish in 2004–05, they were Premier Division champions in 2005–06, resulting in promotion to Division Two of the Northern League. The club entered the FA Vase for the first time the following season.

In 2011–12 Team Northumbria won the Northern League's Ernest Armstrong Memorial Cup, beating Chester-le-Street Town on penalties in the final; they also reached the final of the Northumberland Senior Cup, losing on penalties to Newcastle United reserves, as well as winning the Division Two title, resulting in promotion to Division One. Although they were relegated back to Division Two at the end of the 2013–14 season, they were Division Two runners-up in 2016–17 and were promoted to Division One again.

In the summer of 2018, Team Northumbria resigned from the Northern League, continuing playing in the BUCS Premier North League.

== Honours ==
- Northern League
  - Division Two champions 2011–12
  - Ernest Armstrong Memorial Cup winners 2010–11
- Northern Alliance
  - Premier Division champions 2005–06

== Records ==
- Best FA Cup performance: First qualifying round, 2013–14
- Best FA Vase performance: Third round, 2015–16

== See also ==
- Team Northumbria F.C. players
