= Ryton & Crawcrook Albion F.C. =

Association football club in England

Coordinates: 54°58′14.8″N 1°47′37.9″W

Ryton & Crawcrook Albion FC
- Full name: Ryton & Crawcrook Albion Football Club
- Nicknames: The Albion; RACA
- Founded: 1970 (as Ryton F.C.)
- Ground: Kingsley Park; Crawcrook; Tyne and Wear; NE40 3SN
- Capacity: 1,500
- Chairman: Richard Hands
- Manager: Nathan Beckham
- League: Northern League Division Two
- 2025–26: Northern League Division Two, 9th of 22
- Website: http://www.racafc1970.co.uk
Home colours	Away colours

Ryton & Crawcrook Albion Football Club is a semi-professional English non-league football club from Crawcrook, near Ryton, Newcastle upon Tyne, in Tyne and Wear, currently playing in the Northern League Division Two. The team, nicknamed "Albion" or the "RACA", play their home games at Kingsley Park. They were known as Ryton F.C. until 2011.

== History ==
The club crest when it was known as Ryton F.C.

The club was established in 1970 with a single adult team, operating from a local pub. The club joined the Northern Alliance Division Two in 1988, gaining promotion through winning Division One in 1996-7 and the Premier Division to the Northern League Division Two in 2004–05. During this time, they were also runners up in the Challenge Cup (1998–99). This position was aided when, in the mid-1990s, the club was granted a Lottery grant to build a ground and club house. The work was completed in 1998 and the ground was officially opened by Prince Andrew, Duke of York, with the club breaking their attendance figures as they attracted 1,100 people to Kingsley Park for a game against Newcastle United.

The senior team currently plays in the Northern League Division Two, playing against clubs from across the four county football associations in the region, North Yorkshire; Durham; Northumberland and Cumberland. There was also a Reserves side ('Ryton & Crawcrook Albion 'A') playing in Northern Football Alliance Division Two.

With an appearance at the Durham Challenge Cup final at the end of the 2009–10 season, club secretary Ken Rodger used the raised profile of the club to try to attract sponsorship in the summer but the money never came through, despite companies' promises. This led to the departure of manager Barry Fleming and his assistant Paul Brown. Former Ashington assistant manager Peter Craggs took over the managerial role. No consistent squad of players was formed and a total of thirty-five players made appearances for the team in the space of a month, and the inconsistency was reflected in numerous heavy defeats on the pitch, including a 10–0 loss to Shildon in October 2010. That season the club finished 22nd in Northern League Division One and was later relegated to Northern League Division Two where it has remained ever since.

== Stadium ==
The club's ground, Kingsley Park Stadium has one full sized turf pitch, with one stand, which is overlooked by the clubhouse. It also has one seven a side size third generation AstroTurf pitch to the rear, which was built with a Football Foundation grant, and is used not only by the club but by the local community and local schools.

Ryton & Crawcrook Albion F.C. is a Chartered Standard Club and is the only club in the area to allow children as young as six years old to play through the age levels to progress to the senior team and play in the FA Youth Cup, FA Vase and the FA Cup. Including girls teams, the club has two adult teams and twelve youth teams operating. The team is also voluntarily operated, including the managerial committee and coaches.

== Players ==
=== Current squad ===
As of 17th November 2026

Note: Flags indicate national team as defined under FIFA eligibility rules; some limited exceptions apply. Players may hold more than one non-FIFA nationality.

No.	Pos.	Nation	Player
—	GK	ENG	Callum Corkhill
—	GK	ENG	Joe Foalle
—	DF	ENG	George Hayton
—	DF	ENG	Danny Driver
—	DF	ENG	Albe Fletcher
—	DF	ENG	Nathan Beesley
—	DF	ENG	Joe Gascoigne
—	DF	ENG	Rhys Groves
—	DF	ENG	Charlie Grieveson
—	DF	ENG	Fergus Lynch
—	DF	ENG	Jay Hornsby
—	MF	ENG	Jack Elliott
—	MF	ENG	Daniel Craggs
—	MF	ENG	Rhys Hutchinson
—	MF	ENG	Jordan Plunkett
—	MF	ENG	Dan Marriot
—	MF	ENG	Ethan Bewley
—	MF	ENG	Keros Lizinde
—	MF	ENG	Sam Davison
—	MF	ENG	Thomas McIntyre
—	MF	ENG	Dylan Lawson
—	MF	ENG	Joe Groves-Forbes
—	MF	ENG	Ryan Bailey
—	MF	ENG	Darryl Basham
—	MF	ENG	Evann Jardine
—	MF	ENG	Connor Taggart
—	FW	ENG	Louis Calvert
—	FW	ENG	Oliver Bell
—	FW	ENG	Aaron Costello
—	FW	ENG	Callum Johnston
—	FW	ENG	Louis Anderson

N.B. The Northern League does not use a squad numbering system

== Current staff ==
Position	Name
Manager	Nathan Beckham
Coach	Andy Taylor
Coach	Liam McIvor
Coach	Dan Ord
Physiotherapist & First Aider	Katie Smith
Kit Man	Don McCloud
Chairman	Richie Hands
Club Secretary	Kevin Wilkinson
First Team Secretary	John Symons
Media / Website	Shaj Chowdhury
Match Reporter / Website	Stevie Carter
Match Photographer	Colin Robertshaw

== Club records ==
The club's first goal in the Northern League Division One was scored by Craig Marron against Bishop Auckland on 9 August 2008. The club's best run in the FA Cup was reaching first round qualifying in the 2008–09 season. In the same season the club had their best performance in the FA Vase, reaching the second round, a feat the club would eventually repeat in the 2024–25 season.

In April 2010, the club narrowly lost out to Billingham Synthonia in the Durham Challenge Cup Final and in 2018 it reached the final of the Ernest Armstrong Cup only to lose to Chester-le-Street Town. The club won the 2022 Ernest Armstrong Memorial Cup, defeating Newcastle University on penalties in the final.

=== Northern League Era Records ===
- Biggest Home Win 8-0 v Sunderland RCA (12 August 2006) and Esh Winning (16th August 2025)
- Biggest Home Defeat 0-8 v Billingham Town (9 August 2017)
- Biggest Away Win 8-1 v Alnwick Town (11 November 2006)
- Biggest Away Defeat- 0-10 v Shildon (27 October 2010)
- Highest Home Aggregate- 4-6 v Whitehaven (27 August 2012)
- Highest Away Aggregate- 2-8 v Hebburn (21 April 2012) and 0-10 v Shildon (27 October 2010)
- Highest Home Attendance- 552 v Sunderland AFC Academy (Durham Challenge Cup 1st Round 07/10/26)
- Highest Away Attendance- 1044 v South Shields (10 October 2015)
