= West Allotment Celtic F.C. =

Association football club in England

Coordinates: 55°0′35.197″N 1°33′49.342″W

West Allotment Celtic
- Full name: West Allotment Celtic Football Club
- Nickname: Allotment
- Founded: 1928; 98 years ago
- Ground: Craik Park, Morpeth
- Capacity: 1,500
- Manager: Reece Chapman
- League: Northern League Division One
- 2025–26: Northern League Division One (resigned)
Home colours

West Allotment Celtic Football Club is a football club who based at East Palmersville Sports Pavilion, Palmersville, near Newcastle upon Tyne, England, but are temporarily playing at Craik Park, Morpeth. They are currently members of the Northern League Division One but due to abandoning too many matches, they have been forced to forfeit the rest of the season and have subsequently been relegated.

== History ==
Formed in 1928 in West Allotment, a village in North Tyneside, the club played in junior leagues for their first 55 years. They then joined the Northern Alliance in 1983 and won the title eight times before joining the Northern League in 2004. The club then won the Northern League Second Division at the first attempt, gaining promotion to Division One, where they remained until 2011 when they were relegated back to Division Two. West Allotment have participated in the FA Vase since the mid-1980s and have reached the 4th round (the last 32 stage) twice in their history, in successive seasons 2003–04 and 2004–05. They entered the FA Cup for the first time in 2005–06.

The club went on to achieve their highest ever finish in the English Football Pyramid following the conclusion of the 2022–23 season with the club finishing 5th in the Northern League Division One.

On 14 November 2024, the club issued a statement confirming that they were 'on the brink of folding', issuing a plea for investment. Following a two-week suspension of fixtures from the Northern League, the club announced that following a strong response from the community, they would be able to resume fixtures.

In March 2026, the club resigned from the Northern League following a number of postponements due to last minute player withdrawals.

== Grounds ==
- 1928–1938 – Holystone
- 1938–1968 – Farm Ground
- 1968–1995 – Backworth Welfare
- 1995–2001 – Hillheads Park, Whitley Bay
- 2001–2017 – Whitley Park, Blue Flames Sports Ground
- 2017–2020 – Druid Park, Woolsington
- 2020–2021 – Sam Smiths Park, Newcastle Benfield FC
- 2021–2025 – East Palmersville Sports Pavilion
- Present (temporary) – Craik Park, Morpeth Town

In 2001, the club moved to Whitley Park in Benton, North Tyneside after having acted as tenants at Hillheads in Whitley Bay (also in North Tyneside) from 1995. Allotment were to stay there until the end of the 2016/17 season. The club subsequently found another new home, this time outside North Tyneside at Druid Park, Woolsington in Newcastle upon Tyne, formerly the base of the long defunct Newcastle Blue Star. The move caused the financial situation to worsen and the club nearly withdrew from the Northern League as a result.

For the beginning of the 2020–21 season, West Allotment would play their home games at Newcastle Benfield's Sam Smith's Park. Shortly into the season, West Allotment announced that they would be moving to East Palmersville Sports Pavilion which would be their new permanent home. A ground that they would share with Northern Alliance club, Forest Hall.

Due to the 2020–21 Northern League season being curtailed early due to the COVID-19 pandemic, this meant that the club would have to wait a little bit longer to play their first game in their new home. However, it was announced that the club would be promoted meaning that Allotment would be returning to the Northern League Division One for the 2021–22 season. West Allotment Celtic would go on to play their first competitive game in their new home against Thornaby in the Northern League Division One in August 2021 – A game that finished 5–3 to Thornaby.

In June 2025, the club confirmed that it agreed a short-term ground share agreement with Northern Premier League side Morpeth Town AFC.

== Honours ==
West Allotment Celtic's honours
| Competition | | Position | Seasons |
|---|---|---|---|
| Northern League | Division Two | Champions | 2004–05 |
| Northern Alliance | | Champions | 1986–87, 1990–91, 1991–92, 1997–98, 1998–99, 1999–2000, 2001–02, 2003–04 |
| Northern Alliance | | Runners-up | 1988–89, 1989–90, 1992–93, 1994–95, 2000–01 |

== Records ==
- FA Cup best performance: First qualifying round – 2020–21, 2021–22
- FA Vase best performance: Fourth round – 2003–04, 2004–05
