= Jarrow Roofing Boldon Community Association F.C. =

Coordinates: 54°57′02.56″N 1°27′29.38″W

Jarrow Roofing Boldon Community Association
- Full name: Jarrow Roofing Boldon Community Association Football Club
- Nicknames: The Roofing, The Roofers, The Roof
- Founded: 1987
- Dissolved: 2018
- Ground: Boldon C.A. Sports Ground, Boldon Colliery
Home colours

Jarrow Roofing Boldon Community Association Football Club was a football club based in Boldon Colliery, near Sunderland, England. The club was founded by Richie McLoughlin, who played for the club and was manager and chairman, as well as building the club's ground with members of the committee.

== History ==
The club was established in 1987 by Jarrow Roofing managing director Richie McLoughlin and joined the South Tyne Senior League. They were runners-up in their first season, but the league was disbanded and the club joined the Division One of the Tyneside Amateur League for the 1988–89 season. They won the league's Challenge Shield in 1990–91, and after finishing as runners-up in 1990–91, the club moved up to Division Two of the Wearside League. In their first season in Division Two the club were runners-up, missing out on the title on goal difference, and were promoted to Division One. After finishing as runners-up in Division One in 1995–96 the club were promoted to Division Two of the Northern League as champions Marske United did not meet the ground grading requirements.

Jarrow Roofing's first season in Division Two of the Northern League saw them finish third, earning a second successive promotion to Division One. In 2004–05 they reached the semi-finals of the FA Vase, eventually losing 2–0 on aggregate to Didcot Town. The club finished bottom of Division One in 2007–08, resulting in relegation to Division One. However, a third-place finish in Division Two in 2009–10 saw them promoted back to Division One. They were relegated again at the end of the 2011–12 season. In 2013–14 the club won the league's Ernest Armstrong Memorial Cup, with a third-place finish in Division Two also securing promotion back to Division One. After finishing in the Division One relegation places at the end of the 2017–18 season, the club was closed down by McLoughlin.

== Ground ==
The Boldon Community Association Sports Ground was built during 1991 on a patch of land owned by Boldon Colliery's Community Association, which had previously been used as a bowling green. The ground was completed by the start of the 1991–92 season.

The ground's record attendance of 1,100 was set for the home leg of the FA Vase semi-final against Didcot Town.

== Honours ==
- Northern League
  - Ernest Armstrong Memorial Cup winners 2013–14
- Tyneside Amateur League
  - Challenge Shield winners 1990–91
- Monkwearmouth Cup
  - Winners 1994–95
- Craven Cup
  - Winners 1997
- Bill Dixon Cup
  - Winners 1990–91

== Records ==
- Best FA Cup performance: Second qualifying round, 2009–10, 2013–14
- Best FA Vase performance: Semi-finals, 2004–05
- Record attendance: 1,100 vs Didcot Town, FA Vase semi-final, 26 March 2005

== See also ==
- Jarrow Roofing Boldon Community Association F.C. players
