= Norton & Stockton Ancients F.C. =

Association football club in England

Coordinates: 54°35′45.13″N 1°19′25.81″W

Norton & Stockton Ancients
- Full name: Norton & Stockton Ancients Football Club
- Nickname: The Ancients
- Founded: 1959; 67 years ago
- Ground: Norton Sports Complex, Stockton-on-Tees
- Manager: Mark Harrison & Brendan Lowes
- 2024–25: Wearside League Premier Division, 10th of 17
Home colours

Norton & Stockton Ancients Football Club is a football club based in Norton, Stockton-on-Tees, England. They play at the Norton Sports Complex.

== History ==
The club was established in 1959 as Norton Cricket Club Trust by members of Norton Cricket Club seeking a winter pastime, and joined the Teesside League. They won the Durham Minor Cup in 1967–68, and went on to win the North Riding Amateur Cup three times and the Teesside League Cup once.

In 1980 Stockton were wound up. As their remaining assets were transferred to Norton, the two clubs merged, taking their current name. They joined Division Two of the Northern League in 1982 when the division was re-established. In the season 2004–05, they reached the final of the Craven cup losing to West allotment 2–1 They remained in Division Two until 2008–09, when they finished as runners-up and were promoted to Division One.

In 2010, the club achieved its record attendance when a crowd of 1,526 watched them take on F.C. United of Manchester in the third qualifying round of the FA Cup.

In 2019 after a few years of the team not competing, a new team was formed under the management of Lee Tucker and Phil Laverick. They entered the Wearside League in Division Two, where they managed to achieve promotion at the first attempt. However, they dropped out of the league at the end of the 2024–25 season.

The club has a women's team who will compete in the Women's National League Division One North for the 2023–24 season.

== Records ==
- Best FA Cup performance: Third qualifying round, 2010–11
- Best FA Vase performance: Quarter-finals, 2009–10
- Attendance: 1,526 vs F.C. United of Manchester, FA Cup third qualifying round, 2010–11

== See also ==
- Stockton Town F.C.
