= 2026–27 Northern Football League =

English football league season

Northern Football League
- Season: 2026–27

The 2026–27 season is the 129th in the history of the Northern Football League, a football competition in England, known as the Ebac Northern League for sponsorship reasons. The league operates two divisions in the English football league system, Division One at Step 5, and Division Two at Step 6.

The allocations for Steps 5 and 6 this season were announced by the Football Association on 14 May 2026.

== Division One ==
Northern Football League Division One
- Season: 2026–27

Division One featured 17 clubs which competed in the division last season, along with five new clubs.

=== Team changes ===
To Northern Football League Division One

Promoted from Division Two

- Redcar Town
- Yarm & Eaglescliffe

Relegated from Northern Premier League Division East

- Bishop Auckland
- Blyth Town
- Newton Aycliffe

From Division One

Promoted to the Division One East

- Guisborough Town
- West Auckland Town

Resigned

- West Allotment Celtic

=== Division One table ===
| Pos | Team | Pld | W | D | L | GF | GA | GD | Pts | Promotion, qualification or relegation |
|---|---|---|---|---|---|---|---|---|---|---|
| 1 | Bishop Auckland | 23 | 17 | 3 | 3 | 61 | 20 | +41 | 54 | Promotion to the Northern Premier League Division One East |
| 2 | Easington Colliery | 23 | 15 | 3 | 5 | 60 | 28 | +32 | 48 | Qualification for the play-offs |
| 3 | Shildon | 21 | 14 | 4 | 3 | 57 | 26 | +31 | 46 | Qualification for the play-offs |
| 4 | North Shields | 24 | 12 | 4 | 8 | 56 | 41 | +15 | 40 | Qualification for the play-offs |
| 5 | Redcar Town | 23 | 12 | 4 | 7 | 38 | 28 | +10 | 40 | Qualification for the play-offs |
| 6 | Yarm & Eaglescliffe | 22 | 11 | 5 | 6 | 43 | 31 | +12 | 38 | |
| 7 | Newton Aycliffe | 23 | 9 | 9 | 5 | 37 | 32 | +5 | 36 | |
| 8 | Horden Community Welfare | 23 | 9 | 6 | 8 | 39 | 38 | +1 | 33 | |
| 9 | Crook Town | 22 | 9 | 5 | 8 | 56 | 35 | +21 | 32 | |
| 10 | Thornaby | 24 | 10 | 2 | 12 | 51 | 51 | 0 | 32 | |
| 11 | Birtley Town | 22 | 10 | 2 | 10 | 43 | 51 | −8 | 32 | |
| 12 | Carlisle City | 19 | 8 | 5 | 6 | 33 | 30 | +3 | 29 | |
| 13 | Whitley Bay | 23 | 7 | 5 | 11 | 38 | 43 | −5 | 26 | |
| 14 | Blyth Town | 20 | 7 | 4 | 9 | 36 | 27 | +9 | 25 | |
| 15 | Newcastle Benfield | 25 | 6 | 6 | 13 | 33 | 52 | −19 | 24 | |
| 16 | Newcastle Blue Star | 23 | 6 | 5 | 12 | 34 | 48 | −14 | 23 | |
| 17 | Kendal Town | 21 | 6 | 5 | 10 | 30 | 46 | −16 | 23 | |
| 18 | Marske United | 22 | 6 | 5 | 11 | 18 | 38 | −20 | 23 | |
| 19 | Penrith | 23 | 7 | 2 | 14 | 29 | 56 | −27 | 23 | |
| 20 | Whickham | 22 | 6 | 3 | 13 | 35 | 67 | −32 | 21 | |
| 21 | Northallerton Town | 26 | 4 | 5 | 17 | 33 | 72 | −39 | 17 | Relegation to Division Two |
| 22 | Boro Rangers | 0 | 0 | 0 | 0 | 0 | 0 | 0 | 0 | Resigned from the league (Note: On June 30th, Boro Rangers resigned from the Northern Football League.) |

Updated to match(es) played on 21 November 2026. Source: Northern League
Rules for classification: 1) points; 2) goal difference; 3) number of goals scored; 4) number of matches won; 5) head-to-head results

=== Stadia and locations ===
Location of Division One clubs

| Club | Stadium | Capacity |
|---|---|---|
| Birtley Town | Birtley Sports Complex | |
| Bishop Auckland | Heritage Park | 1,950 |
| Blyth Town | South Newsham Playing Fields | 1,000 |
| Boro Rangers | Stokesley Sports Club (groundshare with Stokesley Sports Club) | 2,000 |
| Carlisle City | Gillford Park | |
| Crook Town | The Sir Tom Cowie Millfield Ground | 1,500 |
| Easington Colliery | Welfare Park | |
| Horden Community Welfare | Welfare Park | |
| Kendal Town | Parkside Road | |
| Marske United | Mount Pleasant | 2,500 |
| Newcastle Blue Star | KD Stadium | 2,500 |
| Newcastle Benfield | Sam Smith's Park | 2,000 |
| Newton Aycliffe | Moore Lane | 1,000 |
| North Shields | Ralph Gardner Park | 1,500 |
| Northallerton Town | Calvert Stadium | |
| Penrith | Frenchfield Stadium | 1,500 |
| Redcar Town | Mo Mowlam Memorial Park | |
| Shildon | Dean Street | 2,000 |
| Thornaby | Teesdale Park | 5,000 |
| Whickham | Glebe Sports Ground | 4,000 |
| Whitley Bay | Hillheads Park | 4,500 |
| Yarm & Eaglescliffe | Bedford Terrace (groundshare with Billingham Town) | 3,000 |

== Division Two ==
Northern Football League Division Two
- Season: 2026–27

Division Two featured 18 clubs which competed in the division last season, along with two new clubs:

- Seaton Carew
- Stokesley Sports Club

=== Division Two table ===
| Pos | Team | Pld | W | D | L | GF | GA | GD | Pts | Promotion, qualification or relegation |
|---|---|---|---|---|---|---|---|---|---|---|
| 1 | Jarrow | 22 | 16 | 6 | 0 | 66 | 15 | +51 | 54 | Promotion to Division One |
| 2 | Billingham Town | 21 | 16 | 3 | 2 | 53 | 16 | +37 | 51 | Qualification for the play-offs |
| 3 | Boldon Community Association | 19 | 16 | 2 | 1 | 47 | 16 | +31 | 50 | Qualification for the play-offs |
| 4 | Tow Law Town | 21 | 13 | 3 | 5 | 49 | 28 | +21 | 42 | Qualification for the play-offs |
| 5 | Park View | 22 | 11 | 4 | 7 | 38 | 37 | +1 | 37 | Qualification for the play-offs |
| 6 | Seaton Carew | 22 | 10 | 4 | 8 | 45 | 44 | +1 | 34 | |
| 7 | AFC Newbiggin | 21 | 10 | 3 | 8 | 43 | 43 | 0 | 33 | |
| 8 | Darlington Town | 20 | 8 | 6 | 6 | 33 | 28 | +5 | 30 | |
| 9 | Ryton & Crawcrook Albion | 20 | 9 | 3 | 8 | 32 | 29 | +3 | 30 | |
| 10 | Chester-le-Street Town | 22 | 8 | 5 | 9 | 50 | 46 | +4 | 29 | |
| 11 | FC Hartlepool | 22 | 7 | 8 | 7 | 24 | 30 | −6 | 29 | |
| 12 | Seaham Red Star | 21 | 9 | 1 | 11 | 30 | 42 | −12 | 28 | |
| 13 | Newcastle University | 20 | 8 | 3 | 9 | 32 | 35 | −3 | 27 | |
| 14 | Alnwick Town | 20 | 7 | 4 | 9 | 32 | 25 | +7 | 25 | |
| 15 | Billingham Synthonia | 21 | 7 | 4 | 10 | 45 | 50 | −5 | 25 | |
| 16 | Sunderland RCA | 21 | 6 | 3 | 12 | 28 | 35 | −7 | 21 | |
| 17 | Stokesley Sports Club | 19 | 4 | 4 | 11 | 30 | 41 | −11 | 16 | |
| 18 | Grangetown Boys Club | 21 | 4 | 2 | 15 | 21 | 44 | −23 | 14 | |
| 19 | Prudhoe Youth Club | 21 | 3 | 0 | 18 | 16 | 58 | −42 | 9 | Possible Relegation to a feeder league |
| 20 | Durham United | 20 | 1 | 2 | 17 | 23 | 75 | −52 | 5 | Possible Relegation to a feeder league |

Updated to match(es) played on 21 November 2026. Source: Northern League
Rules for classification: 1) points; 2) goal difference; 3) number of goals scored; 4) number of matches won; 5) head-to-head results

=== Stadia and locations ===
Location of Division Two clubs
Location of Division Two clubs in Tyne and Wear

| Club | Stadium | Capacity |
|---|---|---|
| AFC Newbiggin | Newbiggin Sports Centre | |
| Alnwick Town | St James' Park | 2,500 |
| Billingham Synthonia | Bishopton Road West (groundshare with Stockton Town ) | |
| Billingham Town | Bedford Terrace | 3,000 |
| Boldon Community Association | Boldon Colliery Welfare | |
| Chester-le-Street Town | Moor Park | |
| Darlington Town | Eastbourne Community Stadium | |
| Durham United | Graham Sports Centre | |
| FC Hartlepool | Grayfields Enclosure | |
| Grangetown Boys Club | B & W Lifting Ltd Stadium | |
| Jarrow | Perth Green | |
| Newcastle University | Essity Park | |
| Park View | Riverside | |
| Prudhoe Youth Club | Essity Park | |
| Ryton & Crawcrook Albion | Kingsley Park | 1,500 |
| Seaham Red Star | Seaham Town Park | |
| Seaton Carew | Hornby Park | |
| Stokesley Sports Club | Stokesley Sports Club | 2,000 |
| Sunderland RCA | Meadow Park | 1,500 |
| Tow Law Town | Ironworks Road | 3,000 |
