= 2023–24 Northern Football League =

English football league season

Northern Football League
- Season: 2023–24

The 2023–24 season was the 126th in the history of the Northern Football League, a football competition in England. The league operates two divisions in the English football league system, Division One at Step 5, and Division Two at Step 6.

The allocations for Steps 5 and 6 this season were announced by the Football Association on 15 May 2023. Starting this season, the league's Division One (Step 5) promotes two clubs; one as champions and one via a four-team play-off. This replaced the previous inter-step play-off system. For this season only, there was only one club relegated from the division.

== Division One ==
Northern Football League Division One
- Season: 2023–24
- Champions: Bishop Auckland
- Promoted: Bishop Auckland; Heaton Stannington
- Relegated: Sunderland RCA

Division One featured 16 clubs which competed in the division last season, along with four new clubs.

- Promoted from Division Two:
  - Birtley Town
  - Boro Rangers
- Demoted/relegated from the Northern Premier League:
  - North Shields
  - Shildon

=== Division One table ===
Pos	Team	Pld	W	D	L	GF	GA	GD	Pts	Promotion, qualification or relegation
1	Bishop Auckland (C, P)	38	32	4	2	133	32	+101	100	Promotion to the Northern Premier League
2	Shildon	38	29	4	5	126	32	+94	91	Qualification for the play-offs
3	Heaton Stannington (O, P)	38	23	9	6	76	42	+34	78	Qualification for the play-offs
4	Birtley Town	38	24	3	11	98	56	+42	75	Qualification for the play-offs
5	West Auckland Town	38	23	6	9	88	49	+39	75	Qualification for the play-offs
6	Guisborough Town	38	22	7	9	75	40	+35	70 (Note: Guisborough Town were deducted three points for playing an ineligible player.)	
7	Boro Rangers	38	20	8	10	82	42	+40	68	
8	Carlisle City	38	18	6	14	73	81	−8	60	
9	West Allotment Celtic	38	17	8	13	85	53	+32	59	
10	Whitley Bay	38	17	6	15	71	76	−5	57	
11	Whickham	38	16	6	16	73	68	+5	54	
12	Redcar Athletic	38	14	9	15	82	67	+15	51	
13	Crook Town	38	13	12	13	50	60	−10	51	
14	North Shields	38	12	8	18	55	63	−8	44	
15	Penrith	38	13	2	23	82	89	−7	41	
16	Seaham Red Star	38	7	9	22	45	74	−29	30	
17	Newcastle Benfield	38	9	6	23	56	99	−43	30 (Note: Newcastle Benfield were deducted three points for playing an ineligible player.)	
18	Northallerton Town	38	5	6	27	39	106	−67	21	
19	Tow Law Town	38	4	1	33	32	159	−127	13	
20	Sunderland RCA (R)	38	1	2	35	28	161	−133	5	Relegation to Division Two

Source: Northern League
Rules for classification: 1) points; 2) goal difference; 3) number of goals scored; 4) number of matches won; 5) head-to-head results
(C) Champions; (O) Play-off winners; (P) Promoted; (R) Relegated

=== Results Table ===
Home \ Away	BIR	BIS	BOR	CAR	CRO	GUI	HEA	NEW	NSH	NTH	PEN	RED	SEA	SHL	SUN	TOW	WAC	WAT	WHC	WHT
Birtley Town	—	1–4	0–3	1–2	3–3	2–1	1–2	6–1	2–1	5–0	2–1	2–0	2–1	0–2	6–0	8–1	1–3	5–1	2–0	5–1
Bishop Auckland	3–0	—	2–1	5–2	2–2	2–2	3–1	7–1	4–0	4–1	4–0	4–2	3–0	1–3	7–0	12–0	3–0	2–1	3–2	5–1
Boro Rangers	6–0	1–3	—	3–1	3–1	2–2	0–0	2–0	0–1	4–0	5–1	2–2	2–2	2–3	4–0	3–2	2–0	1–2	0–3	4–3
Carlisle City	1–2	1–4	0–2	—	3–3	2–1	1–0	3–1	1–1	3–2	3–2	3–2	2–0	0–6	3–1	5–2	5–3	2–2	2–2	2–3
Crook Town	1–0	0–1	0–0	0–2	—	1–3	0–1	4–0	1–1	3–1	1–0	1–4	3–1	0–1	2–1	2–1	1–4	0–4	1–3	2–1
Guisborough Town	3–4	1–2	1–2	2–1	0–1	—	0–0	2–2	2–0	3–0	2–1	2–2	1–1	2–1	3–1	4–0	1–0	3–0	2–1	2–0
Heaton Stannington	0–0	2–1	1–0	2–2	1–1	3–1	—	4–4	4–2	2–1	3–2	3–1	5–0	2–1	4–0	4–1	1–1	2–1	0–2	1–1
Newcastle Benfield	1–2	1–7	0–3	0–3	1–2	1–2	0–1	—	3–3	7–1	4–0	0–2	2–1	1–4	1–0	2–0	1–5	0–4	1–2	1–1
North Shields	3–1	0–2	1–0	5–1	1–2	1–2	0–4	1–2	—	8–0	1–2	2–2	3–0	0–0	2–1	5–1	0–2	0–0	3–0	0–2
Northallerton Town	0–2	1–3	1–1	1–3	2–2	0–3	1–5	0–0	0–1	—	4–2	0–1	3–2	0–3	2–0	1–3	1–7	0–2	1–5	2–2
Penrith	3–4	0–6	0–2	2–0	1–1	0–3	2–0	2–5	0–2	0–2	—	9–3	3–1	3–2	7–1	12–0	1–3	1–5	5–3	2–1
Redcar Athletic	1–4	0–4	1–2	0–1	1–1	1–2	1–2	8–0	2–1	2–2	1–3	—	1–0	0–3	7–2	3–0	1–3	3–1	4–0	1–1
Seaham Red Star	0–4	1–1	0–0	1–3	1–1	0–3	1–2	0–1	3–1	0–0	2–1	0–0	—	0–4	1–0	6–0	3–1	1–3	0–2	1–2
Shildon	3–0	1–5	3–1	6–1	4–0	1–1	4–1	4–0	4–0	4–0	6–0	1–1	4–0	—	2–0	9–1	4–1	0–3	3–0	4–0
Sunderland RCA	0–5	0–1	0–7	2–4	1–1	0–6	2–4	1–7	1–1	2–6	0–7	0–6	1–6	0–6	—	4–2	1–5	2–6	0–1	0–2
Tow Law Town	0–5	0–3	1–2	1–1	1–2	0–3	0–4	3–2	0–2	2–1	1–5	1–8	0–3	1–5	2–0	—	1–3	0–8	2–3	0–3
West Allotment Celtic	0–1	1–1	2–1	0–2	3–1	1–2	0–1	1–1	0–0	2–0	1–0	1–4	3–3	1–3	9–0	5–0	—	4–0	2–2	1–1
West Auckland Town	1–3	0–4	1–1	3–1	1–1	2–0	1–2	2–1	3–0	3–1	1–1	2–1	3–0	1–1	3–1	4–0	2–0	—	2–1	2–1
Whickham	2–2	1–3	0–2	7–1	0–1	0–1	2–2	3–0	2–0	3–0	2–1	1–2	2–2	3–5	5–2	3–1	1–1	2–4	—	2–1
Whitley Bay	1–5	1–2	2–6	1–0	2–1	2–1	1–0	3–1	7–2	2–1	2–0	1–1	2–1	0–6	8–1	4–1	0–6	1–4	4–0	—

Updated to match(es) played on 2 May 2024. Source:
Legend: Blue = home team win; Yellow = draw; Red = away team win.

=== Play-offs ===
Semi-finals
2	Shildon	0
5	West Auckland Town	1
3	Heaton Stannington	1
4	Birtley Town	0

Final
3	Heaton Stannington	3
5	West Auckland Town	0

==== Semifinals ====
1 May 2024	Shildon	0–1	West Auckland Town	Shildon
19:30 GMT		Report	Scott 90'	Stadium: Dean Street; Attendance: 604

2 May 2024	Heaton Stannington	1–0	Birtley Town	High Heaton
19:30 GMT	Shepherd 51'	Report		Stadium: Grounsell Park; Attendance: 1,235

==== Final ====
6 May 2024	Heaton Stannington	3–0	West Auckland Town	High Heaton
15:00 GMT	Lamb 47'; Burn 57'; Anderson 85'	Report		Stadium: Grounsell Park; Attendance: 2,107

=== Stadia and locations ===
Location of Division One clubs

Club	Stadium	Capacity
Birtley Town	Birtley Sports Complex	
Bishop Auckland	Heritage Park	1,950
Boro Rangers	Stokesley Sports Club (groundshare with Stokesley Sports Club)	2,000
Carlisle City	Gillford Park	
Crook Town	The Sir Tom Cowie Millfield Ground	1,500
Guisborough Town	King George V Ground	
Heaton Stannington	Grounsell Park	
Newcastle Benfield	Sam Smith’s Park	2,000
North Shields	Ralph Gardner Park	1,500
Northallerton Town	Calvert Stadium	
Penrith	Frenchfield Stadium	1,500
Redcar Athletic	Green Lane	
Seaham Red Star	Seaham Town Park	
Shildon	Dean Street	2,000
Sunderland RCA	Meadow Park	1,500
Tow Law Town	Ironworks Road	3,000
West Allotment Celtic	East Palmersville Sports Pavilion	1,500
West Auckland Town	Darlington Road	2,000
Whickham	Glebe Sports Ground	4,000
Whitley Bay	Hillheads Park	4,500

== Division Two ==
Northern Football League Division Two
- Season: 2023–24
- Champions: Blyth Town
- Promoted: Blyth Town; Easington Colliery; Newcastle Blue Star
- Relegated: Brandon United

Division Two featured 18 clubs which competed in the division last season, along with four new clubs:

- FC Hartlepool, promoted from the Wearside League
- Newcastle Blue Star, promoted from the Northern Alliance
- Thornaby, relegated from Division One
- Yarm & Eaglescliffe, promoted from the North Riding League

=== Division Two table ===
Pos	Team	Pld	W	D	L	GF	GA	GD	Pts	Promotion, qualification or relegation
1	Blyth Town (C, P)	42	34	3	5	139	37	+102	105	Promotion to Division Two
2	Newcastle Blue Star (P)	42	27	8	7	102	46	+56	89	Qualification for the play-offs, then promotion to Division One
3	Easington Colliery (O, P)	42	25	8	9	97	49	+48	83	Qualification for the play-offs
4	Bedlington Terriers	42	24	5	13	81	54	+27	77	Qualification for the play-offs
5	Horden Community Welfare	42	22	8	12	76	58	+18	74	Qualification for the play-offs
6	Billingham Synthonia	42	21	10	11	105	62	+43	73	
7	Chester-le-Street Town	42	21	9	12	83	60	+23	72	
8	Yarm & Eaglescliffe	42	21	8	13	79	70	+9	71	
9	Newcastle University	42	19	7	16	104	78	+26	64	
10	Esh Winning	42	17	13	12	61	69	−8	64	
11	Ryton & Crawcrook Albion	42	19	5	18	99	68	+31	62	
12	Jarrow	42	18	8	16	80	72	+8	62	
13	Thornaby	42	18	7	17	61	57	+4	61	
14	FC Hartlepool	42	18	9	15	81	64	+17	60 (Note: FC Hartlepool were deducted three points for playing an ineligible player.)	
15	Prudhoe Youth Club	42	13	10	19	73	73	0	49	
16	Boldon Community Association	42	12	10	20	62	91	−29	46	
17	Redcar Town	42	14	4	24	57	90	−33	46	
18	Billingham Town	42	12	8	22	58	85	−27	44	
19	Chester-le-Street United	42	12	6	24	50	79	−29	42	
20	Sunderland West End	42	8	7	27	61	96	−35	31	
21	Washington	42	6	2	34	43	149	−106	20	
22	Brandon United (R)	42	3	1	38	30	175	−145	7 (Note: Brandon United were deducted three points for playing an ineligible player.)	Relegation to the Wearside League

Source: Northern League
Rules for classification: 1) points; 2) goal difference; 3) number of goals scored; 4) number of matches won; 5) head-to-head results
(C) Champions; (O) Play-off winners; (P) Promoted; (R) Relegated

=== Results Table ===
Home \ Away	BED	BIS	BIT	BLY	BOL	BRA	CST	CSU	EAS	ESH	FCH	HOR	JAR	NBS	NU	PRU	RED	RYT	SUN	THO	WAS	YAR
Bedlington Terriers	—	0–2	3–1	1–3	2–3	3–1	0–3	0–1	3–1	3–2	5–0	2–2	1–3	1–0	4–2	3–2	2–0	1–1	1–3	2–0	1–0	6–3
Billingham Synthonia	1–2	—	3–1	0–3	5–0	12–0	2–2	3–0	1–2	1–1	1–1	4–2	1–1	1–3	0–4	3–1	2–0	2–5	4–0	3–2	2–0	2–2
Billingham Town	1–3	1–3	—	0–6	0–0	3–1	1–2	0–3	0–1	1–1	2–3	3–4	0–3	0–5	1–2	1–1	5–0	1–1	1–1	1–0	6–0	2–2
Blyth Town	3–0	4–3	3–0	—	5–3	11–0	0–2	7–1	1–0	1–2	4–1	2–1	2–1	2–2	4–1	1–0	5–1	4–1	6–1	2–0	11–0	3–2
Boldon CA	0–1	3–3	0–2	0–8	—	3–1	2–2	2–2	1–0	3–1	0–0	1–3	3–3	2–5	0–4	0–1	3–0	2–5	0–1	1–1	4–1	0–3
Brandon United	0–1	2–8	0–1	1–2	1–0	—	2–3	1–2	0–2	2–3	1–4	1–2	2–1	1–7	1–8	0–3	1–3	0–5	0–4	0–2	0–0	2–3
Chester-le-Street Town	0–2	0–1	1–2	3–1	2–0	5–0	—	1–0	2–2	1–2	1–2	0–1	2–1	2–2	3–6	3–1	3–1	3–2	2–1	1–3	3–1	1–3
Chester-le-Street United	2–1	0–4	2–3	0–2	1–3	3–1	1–3	—	0–3	0–0	2–1	2–3	0–3	0–2	1–1	0–1	0–1	0–6	5–0	0–2	1–2	0–1
Easington Colliery	0–1	3–0	1–2	1–5	3–0	4–0	1–1	5–0	—	5–0	2–2	1–0	3–0	0–3	2–2	2–1	2–2	1–6	6–1	3–1	4–1	1–1
Esh Winning	0–0	3–1	2–2	1–1	2–1	4–1	0–3	2–2	2–2	—	3–1	2–0	1–0	1–4	2–0	2–0	0–4	2–3	2–0	2–0	3–0	2–2
FC Hartlepool	2–1	1–1	3–0	1–3	0–2	9–0	1–0	2–1	1–3	3–1	—	5–0	1–2	2–1	1–3	3–3	2–0	3–1	0–0	1–3	9–0	2–1
Horden CW	1–1	2–0	3–1	0–4	1–1	3–0	3–1	3–0	1–2	5–0	0–0	—	2–3	0–1	5–3	3–0	0–1	2–0	1–0	0–0	2–0	4–4
Jarrow	2–0	0–5	2–4	2–1	0–0	7–1	0–0	0–1	0–6	1–2	1–1	3–1	—	2–3	4–3	2–2	3–2	2–1	3–3	3–0	9–2	1–1
Newcastle Blue Star	3–2	1–1	4–0	1–1	0–2	5–0	2–1	3–1	0–5	0–0	3–3	1–1	1–0	—	1–3	2–0	0–0	0–2	1–0	1–0	5–1	2–1
Newcastle University	0–3	2–2	1–0	0–2	1–3	1–0	3–4	2–2	2–3	1–1	1–0	5–1	2–3	1–4	—	1–1	4–1	3–2	4–1	1–2	3–0	5–1
Prudhoe Youth Club	0–1	2–3	4–1	1–2	1–1	9–0	4–4	0–2	0–4	1–2	1–2	1–1	1–0	1–2	2–0	—	3–4	3–3	2–1	1–2	3–2	2–2
Redcar Town	2–1	0–2	3–2	0–1	1–2	2–1	2–2	1–2	1–2	1–1	0–2	0–4	5–1	0–4	0–7	1–3	—	2–1	1–0	2–3	1–2	0–2
Ryton & Crawcrook Albion	1–3	1–1	3–1	0–3	2–1	7–1	1–1	1–0	1–2	3–0	4–0	0–1	1–2	1–2	3–5	1–3	2–3	—	1–2	3–0	2–0	3–1
Sunderland West End	1–4	2–5	1–2	1–3	3–4	9–1	0–2	1–2	2–2	5–0	2–1	1–2	1–2	1–5	1–1	2–2	2–3	0–5	—	0–0	2–3	0–1
Thornaby	1–1	0–3	2–0	1–4	3–2	8–0	0–3	0–0	0–1	1–1	2–0	1–2	2–0	0–3	0–2	3–0	2–1	1–4	3–1	—	5–0	3–1
Washington	0–7	0–3	2–2	0–3	5–2	0–2	1–2	1–8	0–4	0–2	3–2	1–2	1–4	0–5	5–4	1–3	0–2	2–3	2–4	1–2	—	1–2
Yarm & Eaglescliffe	1–2	3–1	0–1	1–0	6–2	3–1	0–3	1–0	2–0	4–1	0–3	0–2	1–0	4–3	2–0	0–3	4–3	2–1	1–0	0–0	5–2	—

Updated to match(es) played on 4 May 2024. Source:
Legend: Blue = home team win; Yellow = draw; Red = away team win.

=== Play-offs ===
Semi-finals
2	Newcastle Blue Star	2
5	Horden Community Welfare	1
3	Easington Colliery	4
4	Bedlington Terriers	0

Final
2	Newcastle Blue Star	1
3	Easington Colliery	2

==== Semifinals ====
3 May 2024	Newcastle Blue Star	2–1	Horden Community Welfare	Newcastle upon Tyne
19:30 GMT	Flounders 5' (o.g.); Ryder 83'	Report	Wallace 51'	Stadium: Scotswood; Attendance: 1,061

4 May 2024	Easington Colliery	4–0	Bedlington Terriers	Easington
15:00 GMT	Davison 20'; Forster 28'; Weirs 38'; Fairley 80'	Report		Stadium: Welfare Park; Attendance: 310

==== Final ====
8 May 2024	Newcastle Blue Star	1-2	Easington Colliery	Newcastle upon Tyne
19:30 GMT	Ogbewe 90+15'	Report	Fairley 87'; Kenney 90+8'	Stadium: Scotswood; Attendance: 1,771

=== Stadia and locations ===
Location of Division Two clubs

Club	Stadium	Capacity
Bedlington Terriers	Welfare Park	3,000
Billingham Synthonia	Stokesley Sports Club (groundshare with Stokesley Sports Club)	2,000
Billingham Town	Bedford Terrace	3,000
Blyth Town	South Newsham Playing Fields	
Boldon Community Association	Boldon Colliery Welfare	
Brandon United	Welfare Ground	
Chester-le-Street Town	Moor Park	
Chester-le-Street United	Riverside	
Easington Colliery	Welfare Park	
Esh Winning	West Terrace	3,500
FC Hartlepool	Grayfields Enclosure	
Horden Community Welfare	Welfare Park	
Jarrow	Perth Green	
Newcastle Blue Star	Scotswood	
Newcastle University	Kimberley Park	
Prudhoe Youth Club	Kimberley Park	
Redcar Town	Mo Mowlam Memorial Park	
Ryton & Crawcrook Albion	Kingsley Park	1,500
Thornaby	Teesdale Park	5,000
Sunderland West End	Ford Hub Sports Complex	
Washington	Northern Playing Fields	
Yarm & Eaglescliffe	Bedford Terrace (groundshare with Billingham Town)	3,000
