= 2021–22 Northern Football League =

Northern Football League
- Season: 2021–22

The 2021–22 season was the 124th in the history of the Northern Football League, a football competition in England. The league operated two divisions in the English football league system, Division One at step 5, and Division Two at step 6.

The allocations for Steps 5 and 6 this season were announced by the Football Association (The FA) on 18 May 2021, and were subject to appeal.

After the abandonment of the 2019–20 and 2020–21 seasons due to the COVID-19 pandemic in England, numerous promotions were decided on a points per game basis over the previous two seasons.

== Division One ==
Northern Football League Division One
- Season: 2021–22
- Champions: North Shields
- Promoted: Consett; North Shields
- Relegated: Billingham Town
- Matches: 380
- Goals: 1,256 (3.31 per match)

Division One featured 17 clubs which competed in the division last season, along with three new clubs, promoted from Division Two:

- Crook Town
- Redcar Athletic
- West Allotment Celtic

=== Division One table ===
Pos	Team	Pld	W	D	L	GF	GA	GD	Pts	Promotion, qualification or relegation
1	North Shields	38	25	9	4	86	30	+56	84	Promoted to the Northern Premier League
2	Consett	38	23	6	9	83	45	+38	75	Qualified for an inter-step play-off, then promoted to the Northern Premier League (Note: Contested an inter-step play-off match as one of the bottom six runners-up from Step 5 with the most points per game (PPG) against a third-from-bottom club out of six from Step 4 with the fewest PPG. The winner rose to Step 4 for the 2022–23 season, while the loser dropped to Step 5.)
3	Thornaby	38	20	8	10	79	49	+30	68	
4	Newton Aycliffe	38	21	4	13	72	47	+25	67	
5	Ryhope Colliery Welfare	38	19	8	11	72	48	+24	65	Resigned from the league (Note: Ryhope Colliery Welfare resigned from the Northern League post-allocations)
6	West Auckland Town	38	19	6	13	78	50	+28	63	
7	Whickham	38	18	7	13	62	46	+16	61	
8	Ashington	38	17	7	14	90	77	+13	58	
9	Sunderland RCA	38	17	6	15	55	54	+1	57	
10	Seaham Red Star	38	15	9	14	55	55	0	54	
11	West Allotment Celtic	38	14	10	14	67	80	−13	52	
12	Newcastle Benfield	38	15	6	17	65	75	−10	51	
13	Guisborough Town	38	13	9	16	52	54	−2	48	
14	Redcar Athletic	38	15	2	21	56	83	−27	47	
15	Crook Town	38	13	7	18	52	70	−18	46	
16	Northallerton Town	38	10	9	19	52	69	−17	39	
17	Whitley Bay	38	11	6	21	51	87	−36	39	
18	Bishop Auckland	38	9	8	21	42	69	−27	35	
19	Penrith	38	10	5	23	47	89	−42	35	Reprieved from relegation (Note: Reprieved as one of twelve clubs with the most PPG out of 16 that were second-from-bottom in Step 5.)
20	Billingham Town	38	5	10	23	40	79	−39	25	Relegated to Division Two

Source: NL website
Rules for classification: 1) points; 2) goal difference; 3) number of goals scored; 4) number of matches won; 5) head-to-head results

=== Inter-step play-off ===
30 April	Histon	1–2	Consett	Impington
	Lindsay 73'		Heslop 44'; Marriott 52'	Stadium: Bridge Road; Attendance: 410

=== Results table ===
Home \ Away	ASH	BIL	BIS	CON	CRO	GUI	NWB	NAY	NSH	NLT	PEN	RED	RCW	SEA	SUN	THO	WAC	WAT	WHC	WHB
Ashington		4–0	2–1	3–3	4–0	1–6	3–1	1–2	1–2	2–1	3–1	1–3	2–3	1–2	4–2	0–1	4–2	4–0	4–0	1–1
Billingham Town	3–3		1–0	1–1	1–3	0–0	0–1	2–5	1–4	2–1	0–0	1–3	0–3	1–2	1–2	2–3	1–1	0–0	1–0	2–2
Bishop Auckland	2–5	1–1		1–2	1–2	0–1	1–7	0–1	1–5	2–4	2–1	2–0	1–1	0–1	2–3	1–1	0–2	1–3	1–2	0–1
Consett	4–4	1–0	5–0		1–2	3–0	0–0	2–3	0–3	0–1	4–0	1–2	3–1	3–1	2–0	2–2	5–0	1–0	2–1	3–0
Crook Town	4–0	2–1	0–2	0–5		1–3	0–1	3–2	1–4	1–0	2–1	2–3	1–2	2–1	1–1	0–1	1–2	2–2	0–2	1–2
Guisborough Town	0–2	2–0	0–1	0–2	1–1		4–1	0–0	0–4	2–2	1–2	4–3	1–1	2–0	2–0	0–4	3–0	0–1	3–2	1–1
Newcastle Benfield	0–3	3–2	0–0	2–4	3–2	0–2		1–2	2–2	3–1	3–1	1–1	0–5	3–2	2–0	1–0	2–3	1–1	2–1	4–2
Newton Aycliffe	2–4	2–0	0–1	0–2	2–3	1–0	3–1		2–0	0–1	2–2	3–1	1–4	3–2	0–3	3–1	0–1	0–2	0–0	8–0
North Shields	1–1	2–0	4–1	0–0	4–0	4–2	2–1	2–3		2–1	5–0	7–0	0–2	2–0	1–1	3–0	1–1	2–0	2–2	2–0
Northallerton Town	4–2	2–0	2–2	1–2	2–2	2–2	1–1	0–2	1–2		3–3	1–2	0–2	1–1	0–2	1–1	1–4	0–2	1–3	3–2
Penrith	2–2	4–3	1–3	2–1	0–4	2–3	1–4	2–5	0–3	1–0		0–2	1–2	1–4	3–2	2–1	3–1	1–4	0–1	0–2
Redcar Athletic	1–4	0–2	1–1	2–1	2–0	0–2	1–4	0–4	0–1	2–1	3–0		0–2	1–0	1–2	3–2	1–2	1–3	0–2	2–3
Ryhope Colliery Welfare	2–1	2–2	1–1	1–2	3–1	1–0	3–1	0–2	0–2	1–1	0–2	2–3		1–2	0–2	1–1	5–1	2–2	1–4	3–1
Seaham Red Star	2–1	1–2	3–0	2–3	1–1	1–1	3–1	1–0	1–0	1–2	1–1	3–0	1–1		2–2	0–4	0–0	0–3	1–0	4–2
Sunderland RCA	0–1	4–3	0–2	1–2	1–3	1–0	3–2	2–1	0–0	2–3	2–0	3–4	1–0	1–1		0–4	2–0	2–0	1–0	3–0
Thornaby	5–0	5–0	3–2	3–2	1–1	1–0	3–0	0–2	0–1	2–0	6–2	4–0	1–2	4–1	3–2		2–2	0–5	2–1	1–0
West Allotment Celtic	3–3	2–1	3–0	1–3	1–1	3–2	2–1	1–1	2–4	3–1	0–2	1–2	1–5	3–3	1–0	3–5		2–4	1–2	1–1
West Auckland Town	5–0	3–0	0–1	3–1	5–1	1–1	3–4	1–2	1–1	3–4	1–0	3–2	2–1	1–2	0–1	2–0	3–5		1–2	6–0
Whickham	5–3	1–1	0–3	0–2	2–0	3–0	6–0	1–0	1–1	1–2	2–0	3–2	0–2	1–0	1–1	2–2	2–2	2–0		3–0
Whitley Bay	1–6	4–2	1–1	2–3	0–1	2–1	2–1	0–3	1–3	2–0	2–3	5–2	1–4	0–2	2–0	0–0	3–4	1–2	2–1	

Source: NL website
Legend: Blue = home team win; Yellow = draw; Red = away team win.

=== Stadia and locations ===
Location of Division One clubs

Club	Stadium	Capacity
Ashington	Woodhorn Lane	
Billingham Town	Bedford Terrace	3,000
Bishop Auckland	Heritage Park	1,950
Consett	Belle View Stadium	
Crook Town	The Sir Tom Cowie Millfield Ground	1,500
Guisborough Town	King George V Ground	
Newcastle Benfield	Sam Smith’s Park	2,000
Newton Aycliffe	Moore Lane Park	
Northallerton Town	Calvert Stadium	
North Shields	Ralph Gardner Park	1,500
Penrith	Frenchfield Stadium	1,500
Redcar Athletic	Green Lane	
Ryhope Colliery Welfare	Ryhope Recreation Ground	
Seaham Red Star	Seaham Town Park	
Sunderland RCA	Meadow Park	1,500
Thornaby	Teesdale Park	5,000
West Allotment Celtic	East Palmersville Sports Pavilion	1,500
West Auckland Town	Darlington Road	2,000
Whickham	Glebe Sports Ground	4,000
Whitley Bay	Hillheads Park	4,500

== Division Two ==
Northern Football League Division Two
- Season: 2021–22
- Champions: Carlisle City
- Promoted: Carlisle City; Heaton Stannington; Tow Law Town
- Relegated: Durham City
- Matches: 420
- Goals: 1,640 (3.9 per match)

Division Two featured 17 clubs which competed in the division last season, along with for new clubs:

- Blyth Town, promoted from the Northern Football Alliance
- Boldon Community Association, promoted from the Wearside League after appeal
- Horden Community Welfare, promoted from the Wearside League
- Redcar Town, promoted from the North Riding League

=== Division Two table ===
Pos	Team	Pld	W	D	L	GF	GA	GD	Pts	Promotion, qualification or relegation
1	Carlisle City	40	26	4	10	115	49	+66	82	Promoted to Division One
2	Heaton Stannington	40	25	7	8	103	47	+56	82	Qualified for the play-offs, then promoted to Division One (Note: Both play-off finalists were promoted after Ryhope Colliery Welfare's resignation from Division One.)
3	Boldon Community Association	40	23	8	9	123	79	+44	77	Qualified for the play-offs
4	Tow Law Town	40	23	8	9	71	41	+30	77	Qualified for the play-offs, then promoted to Division One
5	Easington Colliery	40	23	7	10	88	54	+34	76	Qualified for the play-offs
6	Ryton & Crawcrook Albion	40	23	5	12	87	60	+27	74	
7	Horden Community Welfare	40	22	6	12	94	65	+29	72	
8	Billingham Synthonia	40	21	7	12	87	54	+33	70	
9	Sunderland West End	40	22	3	15	84	69	+15	69	
10	Redcar Town	40	20	8	12	76	54	+22	68	
11	Newcastle University	40	20	6	14	97	71	+26	66	
12	Jarrow	40	16	8	16	89	74	+15	56	
13	Birtley Town	40	15	5	20	76	83	−7	50	
14	Willington	40	14	4	22	74	78	−4	46	
15	Blyth Town	40	14	3	23	65	83	−18	45	
16	Brandon United	40	13	6	21	63	84	−21	45	
17	Chester-le-Street Town	40	12	4	24	60	78	−18	40	
18	Bedlington Terriers	40	9	9	22	62	95	−33	36	
19	Washington	40	11	2	27	55	113	−58	35	Reprieved from relegation (Note: All third-from-bottom clubs at Step 6 were reprieved from relegation. The top 12 second-from-bottom sides were also reprieved on a PPG basis.)
20	Esh Winning	40	10	2	28	48	113	−65	32	Reprieved from relegation
21	Durham City	40	1	2	37	23	196	−173	5	Relegated to the Wearside League

Source: NL website
Rules for classification: 1) points; 2) goal difference; 3) number of goals scored; 4) number of matches won; 5) head-to-head results

=== Play-offs ===
Semifinals
2	Heaton Stannington	2
5	Easington Colliery	0
3	Boldon Community Association	0
4	Tow Law Town	2

Final
2	Heaton Stannington	2
4	Tow Law Town	1

==== Semifinals ====
3 May 2022	Boldon Community Association	0–2	Tow Law Town	Boldon Colliery
19:30 GMT		Report	Hardy 11'; Pearson 79'	Stadium: Boldon Colliery Welfare Ground; Attendance: 307

4 May 2022	Heaton Stannington	2–0	Easington Colliery	High Heaton
19:30 GMT	Holmes 9'; Stephenson 32'	Report		Stadium: Grounsell Park; Attendance: 652

==== Final ====
7 May 2022	Heaton Stannington	2–1	Tow Law Town	High Heaton
15:00 GMT	Stephenson 58'; Bailey 90+4'	Report	McAloon 16' (pen.)	Stadium: Grounsell Park; Attendance: 1,091

=== Results table ===
Home \ Away	BED	BIL	BIR	BLY	BOL	BRA	CAR	CST	DUR	EAS	ESH	HEA	HOR	JAR	NEW	RED	RCA	SUN	TLT	WAS	WIL
Bedlington Terriers		3–3	1–4	3–2	3–6	0–3	2–2	1–5	5–0	2–1	3–4	0–2	1–1	0–3	2–4	2–2	0–4	3–3	1–4	0–3	5–0
Billingham Synthonia	3–3		2–0	3–1	3–2	1–1	1–2	2–1	7–0	1–2	4–0	0–2	1–1	3–0	2–1	0–0	2–1	1–0	3–2	6–1	2–0
Birtley Town	1–0	0–3		1–2	3–3	6–1	2–5	3–1	3–1	2–1	1–2	2–2	5–3	2–2	1–4	1–5	1–2	1–3	2–0	2–1	0–4
Blyth Town	1–3	1–1	1–1		1–3	3–2	0–5	1–2	9–0	2–4	4–1	0–1	1–4	0–3	2–1	1–6	2–2	3–0	0–1	3–0	0–5
Boldon Community Association	2–1	1–2	4–1	4–0		3–1	3–2	1–2	10–0	1–3	4–2	3–3	3–2	2–3	2–1	3–2	2–3	1–1	1–1	2–0	6–4
Brandon United	0–4	2–1	2–1	1–4	3–4		3–0	1–0	1–0	1–3	3–4	2–2	1–2	2–3	1–1	1–1	1–1	0–3	0–3	6–1	1–4
Carlisle City	0–1	4–2	1–0	1–2	1–1	3–1		4–2	16–1	4–1	5–0	0–1	0–2	5–1	4–1	3–1	3–0	2–1	1–0	6–0	5–1
Chester-le-Street Town	0–3	2–4	1–2	0–3	1–1	1–0	1–1		3–0	1–2	2–3	2–1	0–3	1–4	3–4	1–3	0–2	1–2	1–1	1–1	3–3
Durham City	2–2	2–6	1–4	1–3	2–6	0–4	1–2	0–9		0–0	2–5	1–4	0–4	0–4	0–4	0–3	1–4	1–2	0–3	1–0	0–3
Easington Colliery	2–2	2–1	2–4	4–0	5–1	1–3	3–0	3–0	4–0		5–1	2–2	3–1	2–2	2–7	0–2	2–1	0–2	0–1	2–1	2–0
Esh Winning	0–1	2–4	0–5	0–4	0–6	1–2	0–4	1–0	2–0	0–1		1–3	1–3	3–3	0–7	0–2	0–4	2–0	0–4	0–1	2–1
Heaton Stannington	7–0	2–0	3–2	2–0	2–3	9–1	2–2	4–1	5–2	3–2	3–0		1–0	2–0	1–1	4–1	0–1	3–0	3–1	8–3	4–2
Horden Community Welfare	1–0	2–2	4–0	3–1	1–1	3–2	2–6	0–3	8–1	3–3	3–0	3–1		4–2	3–1	1–2	5–1	1–3	0–3	3–1	3–2
Jarrow	3–0	1–0	2–2	3–2	1–2	1–2	2–1	4–0	10–0	0–1	4–1	0–3	2–3		2–2	3–2	0–2	6–3	1–2	1–2	1–6
Newcastle University	3–1	2–3	1–2	2–3	3–5	2–1	1–5	1–2	5–0	0–4	1–0	0–2	3–1	2–2		2–1	1–4	7–2	1–0	3–1	1–1
Redcar Town	2–1	1–0	1–0	1–0	2–2	3–1	1–1	4–2	1–0	1–1	1–3	3–0	1–1	3–1	2–3		0–1	1–3	1–1	2–1	6–2
Ryton & Crawcrook Albion	1–0	1–4	2–0	1–0	4–2	1–1	4–0	2–3	7–1	0–3	3–3	2–1	3–2	1–1	2–4	1–2		1–0	2–1	3–2	1–4
Sunderland West End	6–1	2–1	1–4	4–0	4–2	2–1	0–3	1–0	10–0	1–0	3–1	1–1	2–1	2–1	0–5	2–1	0–2		3–0	7–0	2–1
Tow Law Town	3–1	2–1	3–1	1–0	2–4	1–0	0–1	1–0	7–1	2–2	1–0	1–0	1–1	3–1	2–2	2–2	2–1	2–1		0–0	3–0
Washington	2–1	2–1	5–4	1–0	1–7	1–3	1–2	0–1	9–1	0–4	4–2	0–3	0–2	1–6	0–2	0–2	0–7	5–2	0–1		2–1
Willington	0–0	0–1	1–0	2–3	3–4	0–1	0–4	2–0	2–0	0–1	2–1	2–1	2–4	0–0	0–1	0–1	4–2	3–0	2–3	5–2	

Source: NL website
Legend: Blue = home team win; Yellow = draw; Red = away team win.

=== Stadia and locations ===
Location of Division Two clubs

Club	Stadium	Capacity
Bedlington Terriers	Welfare Park	3,000
Billingham Synthonia	Norton Sports Complex	1,970
Birtley Town	Birtley Sports Complex	
Blyth Town	South Newsham Playing Fields	
Boldon Comm Assn	Boldon Colliery Welfare	
Brandon United	Welfare Ground	
Carlisle City	Gillford Park	
Chester-le-Street Town	Moor Park	
Durham City	Hall Lane (groundshare with Willington)	
Easington Colliery	Welfare Park	
Esh Winning	West Terrace	3,500
Heaton Stannington	Grounsell Park	
Horden Community Welfare	Welfare Park	
Jarrow	Perth Green	
Newcastle University	Kimberley Park	
Redcar Town	Mo Mowlam Memorial Park	
Ryton & Crawcrook Albion	Kingsley Park	1,500
Sunderland West End	Nissan Sports Complex	1,000
Tow Law Town	Ironworks Road	3,000
Washington	New Ferens Park	
Willington	Hall Lane	
