= 2024–25 Northern Football League =

English football league season

Northern Football League
- Season: 2024–25

The 2024–25 season is the 127th in the history of the Northern Football League, a football competition in England, known as the Ebac Northern League for sponsorship reasons. The league operates two divisions in the English football league system, Division One at Step 5, and Division Two at Step 6.

The allocations for Steps 5 and 6 this season were announced by the Football Association on 17 May 2024.

== Division One ==
Northern Football League Division One
- Season: 2024–25
- Champions: Redcar Athletic
- Promoted: Redcar Athletic; Blyth Town
- Relegated: Seaham Red Star; Tow Law Town

Division One featured 17 clubs which competed in the division last season, along with five new clubs.

- Promoted from Division Two:
  - Blyth Town
  - Easington Colliery
  - Newcastle Blue Star
- Resigned from the 2023–24 Northern Premier League:
  - Marske United
- Transferred from the 2023–24 North West Counties Football League:
  - Kendal Town

=== Division One table ===
| Pos | Team | Pld | W | D | L | GF | GA | GD | Pts | Promotion, qualification or relegation |
|---|---|---|---|---|---|---|---|---|---|---|
| 1 | Redcar Athletic (C, P) | 42 | 29 | 7 | 6 | 110 | 24 | +86 | 94 | Promotion to the Northern Premier League |
| 2 | Shildon | 42 | 28 | 4 | 10 | 102 | 52 | +50 | 88 | Qualification for the play-offs |
| 3 | Boro Rangers | 42 | 24 | 8 | 10 | 92 | 58 | +34 | 80 | Qualification for the play-offs |
| 4 | Newcastle Blue Star | 42 | 23 | 10 | 9 | 80 | 48 | +32 | 79 | Qualification for the play-offs |
| 5 | Blyth Town (O, P) | 42 | 22 | 12 | 8 | 88 | 55 | +33 | 78 | Qualification for the play-offs |
| 6 | Kendal Town | 42 | 23 | 7 | 12 | 90 | 51 | +39 | 76 | |
| 7 | Newcastle Benfield | 42 | 21 | 7 | 14 | 73 | 66 | +7 | 70 | |
| 8 | North Shields | 42 | 20 | 6 | 16 | 74 | 61 | +13 | 66 | |
| 9 | Whitley Bay | 42 | 19 | 9 | 14 | 64 | 54 | +10 | 66 | |
| 10 | Crook Town | 42 | 18 | 11 | 13 | 57 | 43 | +14 | 65 | |
| 11 | Guisborough Town | 42 | 16 | 14 | 12 | 66 | 54 | +12 | 62 | |
| 12 | West Auckland Town | 42 | 16 | 9 | 17 | 82 | 81 | +1 | 57 | |
| 13 | Easington Colliery | 42 | 15 | 9 | 18 | 64 | 74 | −10 | 54 | |
| 14 | Marske United | 42 | 15 | 6 | 21 | 59 | 79 | −20 | 51 | |
| 15 | Northallerton Town | 42 | 15 | 6 | 21 | 50 | 71 | −21 | 51 | |
| 16 | Birtley Town | 42 | 12 | 13 | 17 | 59 | 71 | −12 | 49 | |
| 17 | Penrith | 42 | 15 | 3 | 24 | 57 | 76 | −19 | 48 | |
| 18 | Carlisle City | 42 | 13 | 5 | 24 | 58 | 96 | −38 | 44 | |
| 19 | West Allotment Celtic | 42 | 9 | 7 | 26 | 38 | 103 | −65 | 34 | |
| 20 | Whickham | 42 | 10 | 3 | 29 | 45 | 94 | −49 | 33 | |
| 21 | Seaham Red Star (R) | 42 | 8 | 7 | 27 | 41 | 86 | −45 | 31 | Relegation to Division Two |
| 22 | Tow Law Town (R) | 42 | 7 | 5 | 30 | 56 | 108 | −52 | 26 | Relegation to Division Two |

Source: Northern League
Rules for classification: 1) points; 2) goal difference; 3) number of goals scored; 4) number of matches won; 5) head-to-head results
(C) Champions; (O) Play-off winners; (P) Promoted; (R) Relegated

=== Results table ===
| Home \ Away | BIR | BLY | BOR | CAR | CRK | EAC | GUI | KEN | MAR | NBF | NBS | NSH | NLT | PEN | RCA | SRS | SHI | TLT | WAC | WAT | WHM | WHB |
|---|---|---|---|---|---|---|---|---|---|---|---|---|---|---|---|---|---|---|---|---|---|---|
| Birtley Town | — | 1–2 | 0–2 | 1–1 | 1–2 | 4–0 | 1–1 | 2–0 | 1–1 | 2–3 | 1–1 | 1–2 | 3–1 | 2–0 | 1–3 | 3–1 | 4–3 | 5–1 | 0–1 | 4–1 | 0–1 | 1–1 |
| Blyth Town | 4–2 | — | 2–1 | 3–2 | 1–1 | 1–1 | 1–3 | 1–1 | 3–1 | 4–2 | 1–1 | 2–1 | 0–0 | 4–0 | 1–1 | 5–0 | 0–5 | 4–2 | 1–2 | 4–1 | 1–1 | 1–1 |
| Boro Rangers | 5–0 | 2–0 | — | 2–3 | 2–0 | 3–2 | 0–4 | 1–1 | 2–0 | 4–2 | 3–3 | 0–2 | 3–1 | 1–0 | 1–1 | 3–1 | 0–3 | 3–1 | 1–1 | 3–3 | 6–1 | 4–2 |
| Carlisle City | 3–1 | 3–2 | 0–3 | — | 1–2 | 4–0 | 1–1 | 1–5 | 1–6 | 1–3 | 1–2 | 2–1 | 1–4 | 1–2 | 0–5 | 5–0 | 0–3 | 2–3 | 4–0 | 1–1 | 2–1 | 2–3 |
| Crook Town | 0–0 | 1–1 | 0–0 | 4–2 | — | 1–0 | 1–1 | 1–1 | 4–0 | 0–0 | 1–1 | 2–1 | 5–1 | 0–0 | 0–0 | 3–0 | 0–1 | 0–1 | 1–0 | 2–0 | 1–0 | 0–3 |
| Easington Colliery | 0–2 | 0–3 | 1–2 | 1–1 | 4–0 | — | 0–3 | 2–1 | 3–2 | 4–3 | 2–2 | 2–2 | 1–2 | 0–0 | 0–5 | 1–2 | 2–0 | 2–1 | 3–2 | 0–2 | 4–1 | 0–1 |
| Guisborough Town | 5–1 | 1–1 | 2–3 | 0–0 | 0–3 | 0–3 | — | 3–2 | 1–1 | 3–0 | 0–1 | 2–1 | 1–2 | 2–1 | 1–1 | 3–2 | 1–1 | 4–1 | 0–0 | 0–4 | 3–2 | 3–2 |
| Kendal Town | 4–0 | 1–1 | 2–0 | 1–2 | 0–1 | 3–1 | 1–0 | — | 4–0 | 2–1 | 0–1 | 2–1 | 2–0 | 4–2 | 0–2 | 3–1 | 3–0 | 4–2 | 2–1 | 3–3 | 1–0 | 0–1 |
| Marske United | 1–3 | 2–0 | 3–1 | 1–0 | 1–2 | 2–2 | 1–1 | 0–4 | — | 2–4 | 3–2 | 0–3 | 2–1 | 1–0 | 0–0 | 2–0 | 0–4 | 1–2 | 0–1 | 1–2 | 2–0 | 2–3 |
| Newcastle Benfield | 1–1 | 2–3 | 0–2 | 3–1 | 1–0 | 1–2 | 1–0 | 1–1 | 3–0 | — | 1–0 | 0–4 | 0–4 | 2–0 | 2–1 | 1–1 | 1–1 | 1–0 | 2–0 | 2–1 | 4–0 | 4–0 |
| Newcastle Blue Star | 1–0 | 4–2 | 2–1 | 3–0 | 3–0 | 1–0 | 0–2 | 1–0 | 1–2 | 0–1 | — | 1–1 | 3–0 | 1–0 | 1–3 | 4–2 | 0–1 | 0–1 | 4–0 | 3–1 | 3–2 | 4–1 |
| North Shields | 1–1 | 0–2 | 0–2 | 4–0 | 2–1 | 0–1 | 3–1 | 1–3 | 3–2 | 2–2 | 1–2 | — | 2–0 | 3–2 | 3–1 | 2–2 | 2–6 | 4–1 | 1–1 | 3–2 | 2–0 | 3–1 |
| Northallerton Town | 0–2 | 0–3 | 2–2 | 1–2 | 2–1 | 2–1 | 1–3 | 1–2 | 0–3 | 2–4 | 0–0 | 2–0 | — | 2–1 | 0–1 | 1–0 | 0–1 | 3–2 | 0–0 | 1–0 | 1–1 | 1–2 |
| Penrith | 3–0 | 2–3 | 0–1 | 2–1 | 1–0 | 4–1 | 0–2 | 1–8 | 2–0 | 5–2 | 2–3 | 0–2 | 3–1 | — | 0–2 | 2–1 | 2–3 | 3–1 | 1–3 | 3–4 | 1–3 | 2–0 |
| Redcar Athletic | 2–2 | 1–0 | 3–0 | 8–0 | 2–1 | 1–2 | 2–0 | 4–0 | 5–0 | 5–0 | 3–1 | 1–2 | 3–0 | 5–0 | — | 3–0 | 0–1 | 3–0 | 8–0 | 4–0 | 4–0 | 4–0 |
| Seaham Red Star | 0–0 | 0–1 | 1–3 | 0–1 | 1–3 | 0–1 | 0–0 | 4–3 | 2–1 | 3–4 | 0–1 | 1–0 | 1–2 | 1–2 | 0–0 | — | 0–4 | 3–1 | 1–2 | 2–2 | 0–1 | 0–5 |
| Shildon | 3–0 | 1–2 | 3–5 | 6–0 | 4–2 | 2–0 | 2–1 | 1–1 | 4–3 | 1–0 | 2–2 | 1–2 | 6–0 | 1–2 | 1–2 | 2–0 | — | 2–1 | 5–1 | 3–1 | 2–3 | 1–0 |
| Tow Law Town | 2–2 | 2–4 | 2–6 | 0–2 | 0–3 | 3–3 | 2–2 | 3–4 | 0–1 | 1–5 | 2–2 | 0–1 | 0–1 | 2–2 | 0–2 | 1–3 | 1–3 | — | 3–1 | 1–4 | 0–2 | 0–4 |
| West Allotment Celtic | 0–2 | 1–5 | 0–1 | 3–0 | 0–3 | 0–5 | 0–0 | 1–6 | 1–3 | 0–1 | 1–4 | 3–2 | 1–4 | 2–1 | 2–6 | 2–2 | 0–1 | 1–6 | — | 0–1 | 0–1 | 1–6 |
| West Auckland Town | 1–1 | 1–5 | 2–1 | 1–4 | 2–2 | 3–3 | 4–1 | 0–1 | 2–2 | 2–2 | 1–5 | 2–0 | 3–2 | 0–2 | 2–0 | 3–0 | 3–4 | 4–2 | 4–0 | — | 1–2 | 1–0 |
| Whickham | 1–1 | 1–4 | 0–5 | 3–0 | 1–3 | 1–3 | 0–4 | 0–4 | 1–2 | 0–1 | 2–5 | 2–3 | 0–2 | 1–0 | 0–2 | 0–1 | 2–4 | 1–2 | 1–2 | 0–6 | — | 5–0 |
| Whitley Bay | 6–0 | 0–0 | 2–2 | 1–0 | 1–0 | 1–1 | 1–1 | 2–0 | 1–2 | 1–0 | 1–1 | 2–1 | 0–0 | 0–1 | 0–1 | 0–2 | 3–0 | 1–0 | 1–1 | 2–1 | 2–1 | — |

Source: Northern League
Legend: Blue = home team win; Yellow = draw; Red = away team win.
For upcoming matches, an "a" indicates there is an article about the rivalry between the two participants.

=== Play-offs ===
Semi-finals
2 | Shildon | 1
5 | Blyth Town | 2
3 | Boro Rangers | 0
4 | Newcastle Blue Star | 3

Final
5 | Blyth Town | 1 (4)
4 | Newcastle Blue Star | 1 (2)

==== Semi-finals ====
| 25 April 2025 | Boro Rangers | 0–3 | Newcastle Blue Star | Stokesley |
| 19:30 GMT | | Report | Ndiweni 45', 87'; Lanning 63' | Stadium: Stokesley Sports Club; Attendance: 816 |

| 26 April 2025 | Shildon | 1-2 | Blyth Town | Shildon |
| 15:00 GMT | Spalding 78' | Report | Wilson 5'; Teare 38' (o.g.) | Stadium: Dean Street; Attendance: 350 |

==== Final ====
| 2 May 2025 | Newcastle Blue Star | 1-1 (2–4 p) | Blyth Town | Newcastle upon Tyne |
| | Ndiweni 89' | Report | Wilson 89' (pen.) | Stadium: Scotswood; Attendance: 2,151 |

=== Stadia and locations ===
Location of Division One clubs
Location of Division One clubs (Cumbria)
Location of Division One clubs (North Yorkshire)

| Club | Stadium | Capacity |
|---|---|---|
| Birtley Town | Birtley Sports Complex | |
| Blyth Town | South Newsham Playing Fields | |
| Boro Rangers | Stokesley Sports Club (groundshare with Stokesley Sports Club) | 2,000 |
| Carlisle City | Gillford Park | |
| Crook Town | The Sir Tom Cowie Millfield Ground | 1,500 |
| Easington Colliery | Welfare Park | |
| Guisborough Town | King George V Ground | |
| Kendal Town | Parkside Road | |
| Marske United | Mount Pleasant | 2,500 |
| Newcastle Blue Star | Scotswood | |
| Newcastle Benfield | Sam Smith's Park | 2,000 |
| North Shields | Ralph Gardner Park | 1,500 |
| Northallerton Town | Calvert Stadium | |
| Penrith | Frenchfield Stadium | 1,500 |
| Redcar Athletic | Green Lane | |
| Seaham Red Star | Seaham Town Park | |
| Shildon | Dean Street | 2,000 |
| Tow Law Town | Ironworks Road | 3,000 |
| West Allotment Celtic | East Palmersville Sports Pavilion | 1,500 |
| West Auckland Town | Darlington Road | 2,000 |
| Whickham | Glebe Sports Ground | 4,000 |
| Whitley Bay | Hillheads Park | 4,500 |

== Division Two ==
Northern Football League Division Two
- Season: 2024–25
- Champions: Horden Community Welfare
- Promoted: Horden Community Welfare; Thornaby
- Relegated: Bedlington Terriers; Grangetown Boys Club; Washington

Division Two featured 18 clubs which competed in the division last season, along with four new clubs:

- Alnwick Town, promoted from the Northern Alliance
- Darlington Town, promoted from the Wearside Football League
- Grangetown Boys Club, promoted from the North Riding League
- Sunderland RCA, relegated from Division One

=== Division Two table ===
| Pos | Team | Pld | W | D | L | GF | GA | GD | Pts | Promotion, qualification or relegation |
|---|---|---|---|---|---|---|---|---|---|---|
| 1 | Horden Community Welfare (C, P) | 42 | 29 | 9 | 4 | 109 | 42 | +67 | 96 | Promotion to Division One |
| 2 | Yarm & Eaglescliffe | 42 | 29 | 8 | 5 | 101 | 35 | +66 | 95 | Qualification for the play-offs |
| 3 | Jarrow | 42 | 29 | 6 | 7 | 96 | 35 | +61 | 93 | Qualification for the play-offs |
| 4 | Chester-le-Street United | 42 | 25 | 3 | 14 | 72 | 39 | +33 | 78 | Qualification for the play-offs |
| 5 | Thornaby (O, P) | 42 | 22 | 9 | 11 | 68 | 49 | +19 | 75 | Qualification for the play-offs |
| 6 | Esh Winning | 42 | 22 | 5 | 15 | 83 | 56 | +27 | 71 | |
| 7 | Ryton & Crawcrook Albion | 42 | 19 | 9 | 14 | 74 | 63 | +11 | 66 | |
| 8 | Sunderland West End | 42 | 19 | 7 | 16 | 91 | 96 | −5 | 64 | |
| 9 | FC Hartlepool | 42 | 18 | 8 | 16 | 75 | 63 | +12 | 62 | |
| 10 | Alnwick Town | 42 | 18 | 7 | 17 | 78 | 67 | +11 | 61 | |
| 11 | Prudhoe Youth Club | 42 | 16 | 12 | 14 | 71 | 57 | +14 | 60 | |
| 12 | Newcastle University | 42 | 16 | 10 | 16 | 67 | 67 | 0 | 58 | |
| 13 | Darlington Town | 42 | 16 | 10 | 16 | 70 | 72 | −2 | 58 | |
| 14 | Billingham Synthonia | 42 | 16 | 9 | 17 | 76 | 61 | +15 | 57 | |
| 15 | Billingham Town | 42 | 14 | 10 | 18 | 82 | 80 | +2 | 52 | |
| 16 | Chester-le-Street Town | 42 | 16 | 3 | 23 | 61 | 80 | −19 | 51 | |
| 17 | Redcar Town | 42 | 14 | 7 | 21 | 66 | 82 | −16 | 49 | |
| 18 | Boldon Community Association | 42 | 13 | 8 | 21 | 60 | 86 | −26 | 47 | |
| 19 | Sunderland RCA | 42 | 10 | 8 | 24 | 49 | 88 | −39 | 38 | |
| 20 | Bedlington Terriers (R) | 42 | 9 | 9 | 24 | 49 | 96 | −47 | 33 (Note: Bedlington Terriers were deducted three points.) | Demotion to the Northern Alliance (Note: Bedlington Terriers were demoted from Step 6 after failing the Stadium Accreditation process.) |
| 21 | Grangetown Boys Club | 42 | 5 | 7 | 30 | 44 | 116 | −72 | 22 | Reprived from relegation |
| 22 | Washington (R) | 42 | 4 | 2 | 36 | 31 | 143 | −112 | 14 | Relegation to the Wearside League |

Source: Northern League
Rules for classification: 1) points; 2) goal difference; 3) number of goals scored; 4) number of matches won; 5) head-to-head results
(C) Champions; (O) Play-off winners; (P) Promoted; (R) Relegated

=== Results table ===
| Home \ Away | ALN | BET | BIS | BIT | BCA | CST | CSU | DAR | ESH | HAR | GBC | HCW | JRW | NCU | PYC | RED | R&C | SRC | SWE | THO | WAS | Y&E |
|---|---|---|---|---|---|---|---|---|---|---|---|---|---|---|---|---|---|---|---|---|---|---|
| Alnwick Town | — | 6–0 | 1–2 | 3–1 | 1–2 | 0–1 | 0–1 | 1–2 | 1–0 | 4–2 | 7–0 | 0–5 | 2–0 | 2–2 | 1–0 | 3–3 | 1–0 | 4–0 | 4–2 | 0–2 | 3–2 | 1–3 |
| Bedlington Terriers | 2–5 | — | 1–1 | 1–3 | 1–5 | 2–1 | 0–0 | 2–4 | 0–4 | 1–1 | 3–0 | 1–2 | 0–3 | 1–2 | 0–4 | 1–1 | 4–4 | 2–1 | 0–5 | 2–0 | 1–0 | 1–2 |
| Billingham Synthonia | 1–1 | 2–0 | — | 1–0 | 2–5 | 0–1 | 1–2 | 3–0 | 4–0 | 0–3 | 3–2 | 5–2 | 2–3 | 2–0 | 1–2 | 1–3 | 4–2 | 7–1 | 2–3 | 3–0 | 2–0 | 3–0 |
| Billingham Town | 2–4 | 3–0 | 3–3 | — | 6–0 | 2–2 | 1–2 | 2–2 | 1–2 | 1–3 | 1–1 | 1–2 | 0–1 | 3–2 | 0–1 | 1–0 | 6–0 | 6–1 | 2–2 | 1–5 | 3–1 | 0–5 |
| Boldon Community Association | 1–1 | 2–3 | 2–0 | 0–1 | — | 1–3 | 1–2 | 5–2 | 1–1 | 3–10 | 4–1 | 0–3 | 0–2 | 1–1 | 2–5 | 3–5 | 0–7 | 1–1 | 1–2 | 1–0 | 5–0 | 0–7 |
| Chester-le-Street Town | 3–4 | 1–4 | 1–0 | 3–0 | 0–2 | — | 1–1 | 4–1 | 1–3 | 1–2 | 4–2 | 2–0 | 3–5 | 2–0 | 1–2 | 0–2 | 0–2 | 1–0 | 1–2 | 1–4 | 1–2 | 0–5 |
| Chester-le-Street United | 0–5 | 0–1 | 3–1 | 2–0 | 0–1 | 3–0 | — | 1–0 | 0–2 | 2–1 | 9–0 | 2–3 | 2–3 | 3–1 | 0–1 | 4–1 | 1–1 | 4–1 | 1–2 | 0–1 | 4–0 | 0–1 |
| Darlington Town | 2–2 | 3–2 | 1–1 | 2–2 | 1–0 | 1–2 | 0–1 | — | 3–0 | 0–1 | 2–1 | 0–4 | 0–4 | 4–1 | 3–1 | 2–3 | 2–2 | 3–0 | 2–2 | 0–3 | 1–3 | 2–4 |
| Esh Winning | 2–0 | 2–1 | 2–2 | 0–1 | 2–3 | 2–1 | 0–1 | 0–0 | — | 1–0 | 3–2 | 0–6 | 1–2 | 2–1 | 0–0 | 3–2 | 0–1 | 4–0 | 5–1 | 2–3 | 7–0 | 0–1 |
| FC Hartlepool | 4–0 | 0–3 | 0–1 | 0–0 | 0–0 | 4–2 | 1–0 | 2–4 | 1–4 | — | 0–0 | 0–0 | 1–1 | 1–3 | 3–1 | 3–0 | 2–1 | 2–3 | 1–0 | 2–1 | 4–0 | 4–2 |
| Grangetown Boys Club | 0–1 | 2–2 | 0–5 | 1–7 | 1–0 | 1–2 | 0–2 | 3–1 | 1–2 | 1–4 | — | 1–7 | 0–3 | 0–2 | 2–2 | 0–1 | 1–2 | 2–3 | 2–3 | 1–1 | 3–1 | 0–4 |
| Horden Community Welfare | 2–0 | 4–1 | 1–1 | 6–1 | 3–0 | 4–0 | 1–0 | 1–1 | 5–1 | 3–1 | 2–1 | — | 1–1 | 2–1 | 1–0 | 3–1 | 2–3 | 0–1 | 6–3 | 4–3 | 2–1 | 0–0 |
| Jarrow | 3–0 | 4–0 | 3–1 | 3–1 | 1–1 | 3–0 | 0–1 | 2–1 | 0–1 | 4–2 | 2–0 | 2–2 | — | 5–1 | 5–0 | 4–0 | 1–0 | 2–0 | 5–0 | 1–2 | 3–0 | 1–2 |
| Newcastle University | 3–2 | 1–1 | 2–2 | 4–1 | 4–1 | 0–0 | 1–3 | 0–1 | 2–0 | 2–1 | 1–1 | 0–3 | 1–0 | — | 1–1 | 1–3 | 3–1 | 3–1 | 1–2 | 1–1 | 2–2 | 1–3 |
| Prudhoe Youth Club | 2–0 | 1–1 | 3–1 | 2–2 | 1–3 | 3–1 | 2–1 | 1–2 | 0–2 | 2–2 | 3–3 | 0–1 | 0–0 | 3–1 | — | 1–3 | 0–1 | 2–2 | 5–1 | 0–1 | 6–0 | 0–4 |
| Redcar Town | 1–3 | 2–1 | 1–1 | 0–4 | 0–0 | 2–3 | 0–2 | 0–4 | 4–2 | 0–2 | 2–1 | 0–2 | 1–3 | 1–2 | 2–1 | — | 1–1 | 0–3 | 4–1 | 0–4 | 3–0 | 3–3 |
| Ryton & Crawcrook Albion | 1–1 | 2–2 | 2–0 | 2–1 | 1–0 | 1–0 | 0–3 | 1–1 | 1–1 | 5–0 | 4–1 | 1–1 | 0–3 | 0–2 | 0–2 | 2–1 | — | 4–1 | 1–3 | 2–4 | 3–0 | 1–0 |
| Sunderland RCA | 0–0 | 2–0 | 0–0 | 2–4 | 1–0 | 2–4 | 1–2 | 1–2 | 0–2 | 0–1 | 0–2 | 2–2 | 0–1 | 2–0 | 1–2 | 2–1 | 2–3 | — | 1–1 | 3–1 | 3–1 | 1–4 |
| Sunderland West End | 2–1 | 3–0 | 2–1 | 3–3 | 3–2 | 3–1 | 1–3 | 2–2 | 1–6 | 3–2 | 3–0 | 1–2 | 1–2 | 1–6 | 1–1 | 2–1 | 1–3 | 2–2 | — | 0–2 | 8–0 | 5–6 |
| Thornaby | 2–0 | 3–1 | 1–0 | 1–1 | 1–0 | 0–2 | 2–1 | 2–0 | 1–4 | 0–0 | 2–1 | 0–4 | 2–2 | 0–2 | 1–1 | 0–0 | 2–1 | 2–0 | 2–4 | — | 4–0 | 0–0 |
| Washington | 1–3 | 4–0 | 1–4 | 3–4 | 0–1 | 0–3 | 0–2 | 0–5 | 0–8 | 2–1 | 1–3 | 2–4 | 0–1 | 1–2 | 0–7 | 1–7 | 0–5 | 1–1 | 1–3 | 0–1 | — | 0–8 |
| Yarm & Eaglescliffe | 3–0 | 1–0 | 1–0 | 2–0 | 0–0 | 3–1 | 0–1 | 0–1 | 1–0 | 2–1 | 5–0 | 1–1 | 3–2 | 1–1 | 0–0 | 2–1 | 3–0 | 3–1 | 3–1 | 1–1 | 2–0 | — |

Source: Northern League
Legend: Blue = home team win; Yellow = draw; Red = away team win.
For upcoming matches, an "a" indicates there is an article about the rivalry between the two participants.

=== Play-offs ===
Semi-finals
2 | Yarm & Eaglescliffe | 0
5 | Thornaby | 3
3 | Jarrow | 0 (4)
4 | Chester-le-Street United | 0 (2)

Final
5 | Thornaby | 0 (4)
3 | Jarrow | 0 (2)

==== Semi-finals ====
| 28th April 2025 | Jarrow | 0–0 (4–2 p) | Chester-le-Street United | Jarrow |
| 19:30 GMT | | Report | | Stadium: Perth Green; Attendance: 671 |

| 29th April 2025 | Yarm & Eaglescliffe | 0–3 | Thornaby | Billingham |
| 19:30 GMT | | Report | Proctor 25'; Wright 52'; Twinn 90+6' | Stadium: Bedford Terrace; Attendance: 613 |

==== Final ====
| 3rd May 2025 | Jarrow | 0–0 (2–4 p) | Thornaby | Jarrow |
| 15:00 GMT | | Report | | Stadium: Perth Green; Attendance: 837 |

=== Stadia and locations ===
Location of Division Two clubs
Location of Division Two clubs in Tyne and Wear

| Club | Stadium | Capacity |
|---|---|---|
| Alnwick Town | St James' Park | 2,500 |
| Bedlington Terriers | Welfare Park | 3,000 |
| Billingham Synthonia | Stokesley Sports Club (groundshare with Stokesley Sports Club) | 2,000 |
| Billingham Town | Bedford Terrace | 3,000 |
| Boldon Community Association | Boldon Colliery Welfare | |
| Chester-le-Street Town | Moor Park | |
| Chester-le-Street United | Riverside | |
| Darlington Town | Eastbourne Community Stadium | |
| Esh Winning | West Terrace | 3,500 |
| FC Hartlepool | Grayfields Enclosure | |
| Grangetown Boys Club | B & W Lifting Ltd Stadium | |
| Horden Community Welfare | Welfare Park | |
| Jarrow | Perth Green | |
| Newcastle University | Kimberley Park | |
| Prudhoe Youth Club | Kimberley Park | |
| Redcar Town | Mo Mowlam Memorial Park | |
| Ryton & Crawcrook Albion | Kingsley Park | 1,500 |
| Sunderland RCA | Meadow Park | 1,500 |
| Sunderland West End | Ford Hub Sports Complex | |
| Thornaby | Teesdale Park | 5,000 |
| Washington | Northern Playing Fields | |
| Yarm & Eaglescliffe | Bedford Terrace (groundshare with Billingham Town) | 3,000 |
