= 2022–23 Northern Football League =

Northern Football League
- Season: 2022–23

The 2022–23 season was the 125th in the history of the Northern Football League, a football competition in England. The league operated two divisions in the English football league system, Division One at step 5, and Division Two at step 6.

The allocations for Steps 5 and 6 this season were announced by the Football Association on 12 May 2022, and were subject to appeals.

== Division One ==
Northern Football League Division One
- Season: 2022–23
- Champions: Newton Aycliffe
- Promoted: Ashington; Newton Aycliffe
- Relegated: Thornaby
- Matches: 380
- Goals: 1,285 (3.38 per match)

Division One featured 16 clubs which competed in the division last season, along with four new clubs.

- Promoted from Division Two:
  - Carlisle City
  - Heaton Stannington
  - Tow Law Town
- Plus:
  - Pickering Town, relegated from the Northern Premier League

=== Division One table ===
Pos	Team	Pld	W	D	L	GF	GA	GD	Pts	Promotion, qualification or relegation
1	Newton Aycliffe	38	27	4	7	102	48	+54	85	Promoted to the Northern Premier League
2	Ashington	38	25	5	8	79	35	+44	80	Qualified for an inter-step play-off, promoted to the Northern Premier League
3	Bishop Auckland	38	24	6	8	99	48	+51	78	
4	Whitley Bay	38	22	7	9	68	55	+13	73	
5	West Allotment Celtic	38	21	4	13	74	55	+19	67	
6	Redcar Athletic	38	18	7	13	83	70	+13	61	
7	Whickham	38	18	7	13	56	49	+7	61	
8	Heaton Stannington	38	18	5	15	81	62	+19	59	
9	Guisborough Town	38	16	9	13	69	54	+15	57	
10	Newcastle Benfield	38	14	11	13	67	57	+10	53	
11	West Auckland Town	38	12	11	15	65	65	0	47	
12	Tow Law Town	38	14	4	20	59	84	−25	46	
13	Crook Town	38	14	2	22	52	77	−25	44	
14	Penrith	38	11	8	19	45	64	−19	41	
15	Carlisle City	38	10	10	18	57	68	−11	37 (Note: Carlisle City were deducted three points for playing an ineligible player.)	
16	Seaham Red Star	38	9	9	20	46	61	−15	36	
17	Pickering Town	38	11	3	24	45	94	−49	36	Transferred to the Northern Counties East League
18	Northallerton Town	38	10	8	20	53	73	−20	35 (Note: Northallerton Town were deducted three points for playing an ineligible player.)	
19	Sunderland RCA	38	11	5	22	43	94	−51	35 (Note: Sunderland RCA were deducted three points for playing an ineligible player.)	Reprieved from relegation
20	Thornaby	38	9	7	22	42	72	−30	31 (Note: Thornaby were deducted three points for playing an ineligible player.)	Relegated to Division Two

Source: Northern League
Rules for classification: 1) points; 2) goal difference; 3) number of goals scored; 4) number of matches won; 5) head-to-head results

=== Inter-step play-off ===
29 April 2023	Glossop North End	0–3	Ashington	Glossop
15:00		Report	Harmison 26', 66'; Spooner 69'	Stadium: The Amdec Forklift Stadium; Attendance: 1,052

=== Stadia and locations ===
Location of Division One clubs

Club	Stadium	Capacity
Ashington	Woodhorn Lane	
Bishop Auckland	Heritage Park	1,950
Carlisle City	Gillford Park	
Crook Town	The Sir Tom Cowie Millfield Ground	1,500
Guisborough Town	King George V Ground	
Heaton Stannington	Grounsell Park	
Newcastle Benfield	Sam Smith’s Park	2,000
Newton Aycliffe	Moore Lane Park	
Northallerton Town	Calvert Stadium	
Penrith	Frenchfield Stadium	1,500
Pickering Town	Mill Lane	2,000
Redcar Athletic	Green Lane	
Seaham Red Star	Seaham Town Park	
Sunderland RCA	Meadow Park	1,500
Thornaby	Teesdale Park	5,000
Tow Law Town	Ironworks Road	3,000
West Allotment Celtic	East Palmersville Sports Pavilion	1,500
West Auckland Town	Darlington Road	2,000
Whickham	Glebe Sports Ground	4,000
Whitley Bay	Hillheads Park	4,500

== Division Two ==
Northern Football League Division Two
- Season: 2022–23
- Champions: Boro Rangers
- Promoted: Birtley Town; Boro Rangers
- Relegated: Willington
- Matches: 420
- Goals: 1,545 (3.68 per match)

Division Two featured 17 clubs which competed in the division last season, along with four new clubs:

- Billingham Town, relegated from Division One
- Boro Rangers, promoted from the North Riding League
- Chester-le-Street United, promoted from the Wearside League
- Prudhoe Youth Club, promoted from the Northern Alliance

=== Division Two table ===
Pos	Team	Pld	W	D	L	GF	GA	GD	Pts	Promotion, qualification or relegation
1	Boro Rangers	40	28	9	3	97	34	+63	93	Promoted to Division One
2	Horden Community Welfare	40	29	3	8	95	44	+51	90	Qualified for the play-offs
3	Bedlington Terriers	40	28	5	7	120	58	+62	89	Qualified for the play-offs
4	Billingham Town	40	27	5	8	114	59	+55	86	Qualified for the play-offs
5	Birtley Town	40	24	8	8	130	55	+75	80	Qualified for the play-offs, then promoted to Division One
6	Blyth Town	40	21	4	15	83	54	+29	67	
7	Redcar Town	40	19	7	14	70	51	+19	64	
8	Prudhoe Youth Club	40	19	6	15	71	62	+9	63	
9	Boldon Community Association	40	16	8	16	83	83	0	56	
10	Brandon United	40	16	6	18	61	71	−10	54	
11	Easington Colliery	40	15	8	17	70	77	−7	53	
12	Chester-le-Street United	40	16	4	20	79	79	0	52	
13	Esh Winning	40	14	8	18	53	72	−19	50	
14	Chester-le-Street Town	40	15	4	21	50	74	−24	49	
15	Newcastle University	40	14	6	20	71	80	−9	48	
16	Billingham Synthonia	40	12	6	22	71	82	−11	42	
17	Ryton & Crawcrook Albion	40	11	8	21	56	91	−35	41	
18	Jarrow	40	11	7	22	54	82	−28	40	
19	Washington	40	11	4	25	44	80	−36	37	
20	Sunderland West End	40	11	3	26	51	88	−37	36	Reprieved from relegation
21	Willington	40	2	3	35	22	169	−147	3 (Note: Willington were deducted six points for playing ineligible players in two games.)	Relegated to the Wearside League

Source: Northern League
Rules for classification: 1) points; 2) goal difference; 3) number of goals scored; 4) number of matches won; 5) head-to-head results

=== Play-offs ===
Semi-finals
2	Horden Community Welfare	2 (4)
5	Birtley Town	2 (5)
3	Bedlington Terriers	2 (2)
4	Billingham Town	2 (3)

Final
5	Birtley Town	2 (5)
4	Billingham Town	2 (4)

==== Semifinals ====
27 April 2023	Horden Community Welfare	2–2 (a.e.t.) (4–5 p)	Birtley Town	Easington
19:30 GMT	Home-Jackson 74'; Maskell 80'	Report	Rutledge 39', 59'	Stadium: Welfare Park; Attendance: 430

28 April 2023	Bedlington Terriers	2–2 (a.e.t.) (2–3 p)	Billingham Town	Bedlington
19:45 GMT	Chapim 64'; Carr 90'	Report	Gordon 9'; Riding 16'	Stadium: Welfare Park; Attendance: 320

==== Final ====
1 May 2023	Billingham Town	2–2 (4–5 p)	Birtley Town	Billingham
15:00 GMT	Pounder 63'; Braithwaite 75'	Report	Wotherspoon 45'; Rutledge 86'	Stadium: Bedford Terrace; Attendance: 1,315

=== Stadia and locations ===
Location of Division Two clubs

Club	Stadium	Capacity
Bedlington Terriers	Welfare Park	3,000
Billingham Synthonia	Stokesley Sports Club (groundshare with Stokesley Sports Club)	2,000
Billingham Town	Bedford Terrace	3,000
Birtley Town	Birtley Sports Complex	
Blyth Town	South Newsham Playing Fields	
Boldon Comm Assn	Boldon Colliery Welfare	
Boro Rangers	Stokesley Sports Club (groundshare with Stokesley Sports Club)	2,000
Brandon United	Welfare Ground	
Chester-le-Street Town	Moor Park	
Chester-le-Street United	Riverside	
Easington Colliery	Welfare Park	
Esh Winning	West Terrace	3,500
Horden Community Welfare	Welfare Park	
Jarrow	Perth Green	
Newcastle University	Kimberley Park	
Redcar Town	Mo Mowlam Memorial Park	
Ryton & Crawcrook Albion	Kingsley Park	1,500
Sunderland West End	Nissan Sports Complex	1,000
Washington	New Ferens Park	
Willington	Hall Lane	
