= 2025–26 Northern Football League =

English football league season

Northern Football League
- Season: 2025–26

The 2025–26 season is the 128th in the history of the Northern Football League, a football competition in England, known as the Ebac Northern League for sponsorship reasons. The league operates two divisions in the English football league system, Division One at Step 5, and Division Two at Step 6.

The allocations for Steps 5 and 6 this season were announced by the Football Association on 15 May 2025.

== Division One ==
Northern Football League Division One
- Season: 2025–26
- Champions: Guisborough Town
- Promoted: Guisborough Town; West Auckland Town
- Relegated: Northallerton Town
- Matches: 342
- Goals: 1,150 (3.36 per match)

Division One featured 18 clubs which competed in the division last season, along with two new clubs.

=== Team changes ===
To Northern Football League Division One

Promoted from Division Two

- Horden CW
- Thornaby

From Division One

Promoted to the Division One East

- Redcar Athletic
- Blyth Town

Relegated to Division Two

- Seaham Red Star
- Tow Law Town

=== Division One table ===
Pos	Team	Pld	W	D	L	GF	GA	GD	Pts	Promotion, qualification or relegation
1	Guisborough Town (C, P)	36	30	4	2	87	31	+56	94	Promotion to the Northern Premier League Division One East
2	Shildon	36	27	5	4	97	46	+51	86	Qualification for the play-offs
3	Whitley Bay	36	20	7	9	72	45	+27	67	Qualification for the play-offs
4	West Auckland Town (O, P)	36	20	4	12	77	58	+19	64	Qualification for the play-offs
5	Boro Rangers	36	19	6	11	67	43	+24	63	Qualification for the play-offs
6	Newcastle Blue Star	36	18	6	12	77	55	+22	60	
7	Kendal Town	36	18	5	13	72	53	+19	59	
8	North Shields	36	18	3	15	64	60	+4	57	
9	Easington Colliery	36	17	3	16	65	60	+5	54	
10	Birtley Town	36	12	13	11	71	64	+7	49	
11	Horden Community Welfare	36	14	3	19	52	73	−21	45	
12	Penrith	36	11	9	16	69	67	+2	42	
13	Newcastle Benfield	36	12	6	18	42	47	−5	42	
14	Thornaby	36	12	6	18	44	68	−24	42	
15	Carlisle City	36	10	7	19	42	63	−21	37	
16	Marske United	36	9	5	22	48	74	−26	32	
17	Crook Town	36	8	5	23	31	76	−45	29	
18	Whickham	36	6	8	22	40	86	−46	26	
19	Northallerton Town	36	7	3	26	33	81	−48	24	Reprived from relegation
20	West Allotment Celtic	0	0	0	0	0	0	0	0	Resigned from the league (Note: On 14 March, West Allotment Celtic resigned from the Northern Football League. West Allotment Celtic's playing record of Pld29 W4 D4 L21 GD-53 Pts16 was expunged.)

Source: Northern League
Rules for classification: 1) points; 2) goal difference; 3) number of goals scored; 4) number of matches won; 5) head-to-head results
(C) Champions; (O) Play-off winners; (P) Promoted

=== Play-offs ===
Semi-finals
2	Shildon	1
5	Boro Rangers	0
3	Whitley Bay	1
4	West Auckland Town	3

Final
2	Shildon	1
4	West Auckland Town	2

==== Semifinals ====
25 April 2026	Shildon	1-0	Boro Rangers	Shildon
15:00 GMT	L. Harris 66'	Report		Stadium: Dean Street; Attendance: 422

25 April 2026	Whitley Bay	1-3	West Auckland Town	Whitley Bay
15:00 GMT	Livermore 90+3'	Report	Moody 11'; O'Gorman 48'; Steel 86'	Stadium: Hillheads Park; Attendance: 733

==== Final ====
2 May 2026	Shildon	1–2	West Auckland Town	Shildon
	Ardelean 5'		Faulkner 80'; Moody 90+5'	Stadium: Dean Street; Attendance: 1,020; Referee: Reagn Webber

=== Results table ===
Home \ Away	BIR	BOR	CAR	CRK	EAC	GUI	HCW	KEN	MAR	NBF	NBS	NSH	NLT	PEN	SHI	THO	WAT	WHM	WHB
Birtley Town	—	2–3	0–1	4–2	0–0	3–1	4–0	3–3	4–3	3–2	5–3	0–1	2–2	3–3	1–2	1–2	0–2	2–0	1–1
Boro Rangers	3–0	—	4–0	4–0	4–1	0–4	4–2	1–2	2–1	1–0	5–1	1–0	1–0	5–1	1–1	1–3	0–1	3–0	3–2
Carlisle City	1–1	3–1	—	1–0	4–2	1–4	4–1	1–4	2–1	1–2	0–1	0–5	2–2	0–3	0–0	0–1	2–3	3–1	2–3
Crook Town	0–1	2–0	0–0	—	1–4	0–1	0–0	2–2	2–1	0–3	0–2	0–4	0–2	1–6	1–2	1–0	0–4	2–1	1–2
Easington Colliery	2–2	3–3	2–0	2–3	—	1–2	2–1	0–2	2–1	1–0	1–4	2–3	2–0	1–0	3–2	4–0	3–0	4–1	1–2
Guisborough Town	5–0	1–0	2–2	4–1	4–1	—	3–1	3–1	1–0	2–0	2–1	3–2	2–1	3–1	4–3	2–0	2–1	1–0	2–1
Horden Community Welfare	0–1	1–2	1–0	3–1	2–1	1–3	—	0–4	4–3	1–0	0–4	2–1	3–1	3–2	2–3	3–2	1–1	4–3	1–3
Kendal Town	4–2	0–2	1–1	2–0	2–3	0–2	0–1	—	1–2	1–3	2–1	6–1	3–0	5–1	3–3	1–2	2–1	2–1	1–2
Marske United	1–1	2–4	0–3	0–0	0–4	0–3	3–0	1–4	—	0–2	1–1	0–2	2–1	2–3	1–3	4–0	3–0	2–3	0–4
Newcastle Benfield	0–0	0–0	1–0	2–1	0–4	0–1	2–4	0–1	1–1	—	1–2	0–1	5–0	2–2	0–1	1–0	1–2	2–2	1–2
Newcastle Blue Star	3–1	1–0	2–1	3–0	2–0	3–3	1–1	4–1	3–1	2–1	—	3–2	1–2	3–0	1–3	1–2	4–5	4–0	3–3
North Shields	1–6	1–0	3–0	1–3	2–3	0–3	3–1	2–0	0–3	0–3	0–0	—	0–1	2–1	3–4	2–0	0–5	3–1	2–1
Northallerton Town	0–1	0–4	1–2	4–1	1–2	0–2	2–0	0–3	0–4	1–0	0–2	1–4	—	2–2	0–1	1–2	3–1	2–3	0–5
Penrith	2–2	3–1	1–1	1–2	3–0	2–1	2–1	1–2	4–0	1–2	1–4	2–2	4–1	—	0–0	6–0	1–2	2–2	2–3
Shildon	4–4	2–0	2–0	5–0	1–0	2–5	3–1	4–3	6–0	3–1	3–2	2–1	3–1	3–1	—	3–1	6–1	6–0	2–0
Thornaby	2–2	0–0	2–0	2–4	1–0	1–1	0–3	1–2	1–2	1–2	1–1	1–1	5–0	2–1	2–3	—	3–1	2–1	0–3
West Auckland Town	3–2	1–1	1–3	2–0	4–1	1–1	4–0	2–1	2–3	0–1	4–3	1–3	1–0	2–2	1–2	4–0	—	3–1	5–1
Whickham	0–5	0–0	2–1	0–0	1–2	0–2	0–3	0–1	1–0	1–1	1–0	1–5	3–1	1–2	0–5	1–1	2–5	—	4–4
Whitley Bay	2–2	2–3	3–0	1–0	2–1	0–2	1–0	0–0	0–0	4–0	2–1	0–1	3–0	1–0	2–0	5–1	0–1	2–2	—

Source: Northern League
Legend: Blue = home team win; Yellow = draw; Red = away team win.
For upcoming matches, an "a" indicates there is an article about the rivalry between the two participants.

=== Stadia and locations ===
Location of Division One clubs in Northumberland, Tyne & Wear and County Durham
Location of Division One clubs in Northumberland, Tyne & Wear and County Durham
Location of Division One clubs (Cumbria)
Location of Division One clubs (North Yorkshire)

Club	Stadium	Capacity
Birtley Town	Birtley Sports Complex	
Boro Rangers	Stokesley Sports Club (groundshare with Stokesley Sports Club)	2,000
Carlisle City	Gillford Park	
Crook Town	The Sir Tom Cowie Millfield Ground	1,500
Easington Colliery	Welfare Park	
Guisborough Town	King George V Ground	
Horden Community Welfare	Welfare Park	
Kendal Town	Parkside Road	
Marske United	Mount Pleasant	2,500
Newcastle Blue Star	KD Stadium	2,500
Newcastle Benfield	Sam Smith's Park	2,000
North Shields	Ralph Gardner Park	1,500
Northallerton Town	Calvert Stadium	
Penrith	Frenchfield Stadium	1,500
Shildon	Dean Street	2,000
Thornaby	Teesdale Park	5,000
West Allotment Celtic	East Palmersville Sports Pavilion	1,500
West Auckland Town	Darlington Road	2,000
Whickham	Glebe Sports Ground	4,000
Whitley Bay	Hillheads Park	4,500

== Division Two ==
Northern Football League Division Two
- Season: 2025–26
- Champions: Redcar Town
- Promoted: Redcar Town; Yarm & Eaglescliffe
- Matches: 462
- Goals: 1,458 (3.16 per match)

Division Two featured 18 clubs which competed in the division last season, along with four new clubs:

- AFC Newbiggin, promoted from the Northern Alliance
- Durham United, promoted from the Wearside League
- Seaham Red Star, relegated from Division One
- Tow Law Town, relegated from Division One

Also, Chester-le-Street United changed their name to Park View.

=== Division Two table ===
Pos	Team	Pld	W	D	L	GF	GA	GD	Pts	Promotion, qualification or relegation
1	Redcar Town (C, P)	42	32	4	6	101	40	+61	100	Promotion to Division One
2	Yarm & Eaglescliffe (O, P)	42	31	5	6	101	38	+63	98	Qualification for the play-offs
3	Jarrow	42	25	9	8	85	45	+40	84	Qualification for the play-offs
4	FC Hartlepool	42	25	4	13	80	46	+34	79	Qualification for the play-offs
5	Seaham Red Star	42	24	7	11	75	47	+28	79	Qualification for the play-offs
6	Park View	42	21	10	11	57	35	+22	73	
7	Chester-le-Street Town	42	22	5	15	67	48	+19	71	
8	Alnwick Town	42	20	10	12	77	65	+12	70	
9	Ryton & Crawcrook Albion	42	20	5	17	83	53	+30	65	
10	Newcastle University	42	17	9	16	64	61	+3	60	
11	Billingham Town	42	16	6	20	70	70	0	54	
12	AFC Newbiggin	42	14	12	16	65	68	−3	54	
13	Darlington Town	42	16	6	20	59	65	−6	54	
14	Sunderland RCA	42	14	10	18	56	68	−12	52	
15	Sunderland West End (R)	42	13	8	21	59	88	−29	47	Resigned to the Wearside League Premier Division
16	Durham United	42	14	4	24	66	104	−38	43 (Note: Durham United were deducted three points.)	
17	Grangetown Boys Club	42	11	8	23	51	87	−36	41	
18	Tow Law Town	42	10	10	22	48	73	−25	40	
19	Billingham Synthonia	42	13	5	24	73	86	−13	38 (Note: Billingham Synthonia were deducted six points for fielding an ineligible player in their first three league matches of the season.)	
20	Boldon Community Association	42	9	9	24	51	79	−28	36	Reprived from relegation
21	Prudhoe Youth Club	42	9	6	27	44	90	−46	33	Reprived from relegation
22	Esh Winning (R)	42	7	6	29	26	102	−76	27	Relegation to the Wearside League Premier Division

Source: Northern League
Rules for classification: 1) points; 2) goal difference; 3) number of goals scored; 4) number of matches won; 5) head-to-head results
(C) Champions; (O) Play-off winners; (P) Promoted; (R) Relegated

=== Play-offs ===
Semi-finals
2	Yarm & Eaglescliffe	2
5	Seaham Red Star	0
3	Jarrow	2 (7)
4	FC Hartlepool	2 (6)

Final
2	Yarm & Eaglescliffe	0 (5)
3	Jarrow	0 (4)

==== Semifinals ====
25 April 2026	Yarm & Eaglescliffe	2-0	Seaham Red Star	Billingham
15:00 GMT	Wild 68'; Dalton 82'	Report		Stadium: Bedford Terrace; Attendance: 330

25 April 2026	Jarrow	2-2 (a.e.t.) (7–6 p)	FC Hartlepool	Jarrow
15:00 GMT	Hardie 8'; Bainbridge 24'	Report	McGee 3'; Bayes 90+22'	Stadium: Perth Green; Attendance: 332

==== Final ====
2 May 2026	Yarm & Eaglescliffe	0-0 (a.e.t.) (5–4 p)	Jarrow	Billingham
		Report		Stadium: Bedford Terrace; Attendance: 561; Referee: George Groves

=== Results table ===
Home \ Away	NWB	ALN	BIS	BIT	BCA	CLS	DAR	DUR	ESH	HAR	GBC	JRW	NCU	PKV	PYC	RED	R&C	SRS	SRC	SWE	TLT	Y&E
AFC Newbiggin	—	1–1	5–1	0–2	4–1	4–3	0–0	0–1	4–0	0–1	2–2	0–0	2–3	1–2	0–0	1–6	2–1	2–4	2–1	2–0	2–2	2–2
Alnwick Town	1–1	—	3–2	2–0	1–1	2–1	3–1	4–0	1–0	0–0	2–1	2–2	2–4	0–0	2–1	2–4	1–4	1–1	0–0	3–1	4–1	0–4
Billingham Synthonia	4–2	2–0	—	1–3	4–2	0–4	1–1	5–0	0–1	0–2	0–2	0–7	7–0	0–1	2–1	0–1	1–3	5–0	2–3	2–2	3–4	2–3
Billingham Town	3–0	1–4	0–2	—	5–1	3–3	0–3	3–2	1–1	3–1	3–3	1–2	3–2	1–0	4–1	0–1	0–3	3–1	0–3	4–3	1–2	1–0
Boldon Community Association	0–1	1–3	2–1	0–4	—	0–1	2–3	0–2	1–0	3–0	1–1	1–3	1–2	0–1	4–0	0–1	0–0	0–1	3–1	1–2	4–2	0–1
Chester-le-Street Town	1–1	0–1	0–1	1–0	2–1	—	3–0	2–0	0–2	2–1	5–1	4–6	3–2	0–1	1–2	0–0	1–0	0–2	2–2	1–0	1–0	0–1
Darlington Town	0–1	2–4	2–0	3–2	6–1	1–2	—	3–4	4–1	0–1	2–1	2–0	1–1	2–3	2–2	0–3	0–3	2–1	0–0	3–2	2–0	1–4
Durham United	1–5	0–3	7–2	0–3	3–4	1–2	1–1	—	4–2	2–1	3–0	0–2	0–3	3–3	2–1	0–5	2–1	1–3	2–1	5–1	2–1	0–4
Esh Winning	0–1	2–2	0–0	0–4	0–2	1–3	1–0	0–3	—	2–1	2–0	0–2	0–3	0–0	0–3	1–4	0–4	0–4	5–1	1–1	0–2	1–3
FC Hartlepool	3–0	3–0	3–1	1–1	4–1	2–1	1–0	4–1	4–0	—	5–0	0–3	1–1	1–0	3–1	2–1	3–1	1–0	3–0	6–1	2–3	1–0
Grangetown Boys Club	2–2	0–6	3–1	2–2	2–0	0–2	1–0	2–1	1–2	0–4	—	0–1	1–1	3–0	2–1	0–1	4–1	0–2	0–2	0–1	2–1	2–2
Jarrow	1–1	4–3	3–2	0–0	2–2	2–0	2–1	2–2	3–0	1–0	4–1	—	0–0	0–2	1–2	1–0	1–0	1–0	8–1	3–3	2–0	1–2
Newcastle University	1–2	0–1	2–4	2–1	0–0	2–1	2–0	4–0	3–0	1–2	1–1	0–1	—	1–1	1–0	0–4	1–1	1–3	2–1	0–0	4–0	1–2
Park View	3–1	0–2	3–0	1–0	0–0	0–1	0–1	2–1	0–0	2–1	6–2	3–1	2–0	—	1–0	2–2	2–0	0–2	2–0	0–3	1–1	1–2
Prudhoe Youth Club	2–1	2–4	0–5	0–2	2–3	0–2	1–2	3–2	1–0	2–2	1–2	0–3	0–3	0–1	—	0–1	1–4	2–3	0–0	0–2	2–1	2–1
Redcar Town	2–1	2–3	2–5	2–0	1–0	4–1	2–1	2–1	8–0	3–0	2–1	2–1	2–1	0–0	5–1	—	3–1	2–1	1–3	3–1	6–0	2–4
Ryton & Crawcrook Albion	3–2	2–0	2–0	5–0	4–2	0–4	1–2	8–1	8–0	1–2	2–1	0–2	4–0	1–0	2–2	0–1	—	0–1	1–0	1–0	2–2	0–2
Seaham Red Star	2–0	2–0	1–0	2–0	2–2	0–1	2–0	1–2	4–0	3–1	2–1	2–0	3–2	0–0	5–0	2–2	1–5	—	2–1	0–0	2–0	0–3
Sunderland RCA	2–3	0–0	1–1	4–3	1–1	0–3	0–1	2–1	2–0	2–1	3–1	1–3	1–2	0–2	3–1	1–2	3–1	3–2	—	1–1	0–0	0–1
Sunderland West End	2–1	4–2	2–2	2–1	2–1	0–2	3–0	3–1	3–0	1–3	4–1	1–2	0–2	0–7	1–1	1–3	1–2	1–4	2–4	—	2–1	0–4
Tow Law Town	1–2	3–1	2–3	2–1	1–1	1–1	2–0	0–0	1–0	0–3	0–1	1–1	1–2	0–2	0–3	0–1	1–1	0–0	1–2	4–0	—	4–0
Yarm & Eaglescliffe	1–1	5–1	2–0	2–1	3–1	1–0	1–4	6–1	6–1	2–0	4–1	2–1	2–1	2–0	5–0	1–2	1–0	2–2	0–0	4–0	4–0	—

Source: Northern League
Legend: Blue = home team win; Yellow = draw; Red = away team win.
For upcoming matches, an "a" indicates there is an article about the rivalry between the two participants.

=== Stadia and locations ===
Location of Division Two clubs
Location of Division Two clubs in Tyne and Wear

Club	Stadium	Capacity
AFC Newbigging	Newbiggin Sports Centre	
Alnwick Town	St James' Park	2,500
Billingham Synthonia	Stokesley Sports Club (groundshare with Stokesley Sports Club)	2,000
Billingham Town	Bedford Terrace	3,000
Boldon Community Association	Boldon Colliery Welfare	
Chester-le-Street Town	Moor Park	
Darlington Town	Eastbourne Community Stadium	
Durham United	Graham Sports Centre	
Esh Winning	West Terrace	3,500
FC Hartlepool	Grayfields Enclosure	
Grangetown Boys Club	B & W Lifting Ltd Stadium	
Jarrow	Perth Green	
Newcastle University	Essity Park	
Park View	Riverside	
Prudhoe Youth Club	Essity Park	
Redcar Town	Mo Mowlam Memorial Park	
Ryton & Crawcrook Albion	Kingsley Park	1,500
Seaham Red Star	Seaham Town Park	
Sunderland RCA	Meadow Park	1,500
Sunderland West End	Ford Hub Sports Complex	
Tow Law Town	Ironworks Road	3,000
Yarm & Eaglescliffe	Bedford Terrace (groundshare with Billingham Town)	3,000
