= Chris Barrass =

English footballer

Personal information
- Full name: Cuthbert Barrass
- Date of birth: 11 February 1898
- Place of birth: South Shields, England
- Date of death: 13 October 1978 (aged 80)
- Height: 5 ft 9 in (1.75 m)
- Position: Inside forward

Senior career*
Years	Team	Apps	(Gls)
1919–1920	Pandon Temperance		
1921–1921	Jarrow		
1921–1922	Grimsby Town	4	(0)
1922–19??	Jarrow		
- * Club domestic league appearances and goals

Cuthbert "Chris" Barrass (11 February 1898 – 13 October 1978) was an English professional footballer who played as an inside forward.
