= Boro Rangers F.C. =

Boro Rangers
- Full name: Boro Rangers Football Club
- Founded: 2003
- Ground: Phoenix Park
- Coordinates: 54°28′5″N 1°10′42″W
- Chairman: Mark Curtis
- 2025–26: Northern League Division One, 5th of 19
Home colours

Boro Rangers Football Club is a junior football club based in Middlesbrough, England. They play at Phoenix Park. They previously operated a senior men's team, that most recently competed in the Northern Football League Division One in 2025/26.

== History ==
Boro Rangers were founded in 2003 as a junior football club, gradually expanding its operations to provide teams from U7s upwards. This trajectory, and a desire to ensure that those coming through the club's ranks had a chance to represent them in senior football, led to Boro Rangers joining the Teesside League in 2014.

After finishing runners-up in Division Two in 2014/15, the club were promoted to Division One, winning the final two Division One championships prior to the dissolution of the Teesside League. Following this, the club joined the North Riding League, winning the league in five further consecutive seasons.

In 2022, the club was admitted into the Northern League Division Two. They achieved immediate promotion in the 2022–23 season, crowned champions on the final day of the season.

In 2024-25, the club's second season in Division One, they achieved what can be considered as their most successful season yet at any level, reaching the preliminary rounds of the FA Cup, and the first round proper of the FA Vase, as well as reaching the semi finals of the Northern League Division One playoffs, following a 3rd-placed finish. On 30 June 2026, the Rangers withdrew from the Northern Football League ahead of the 2026–27 season and folded their men's team.

== Ground ==
Prior to the 2021-22 season, Boro Rangers played at the Herlingshaw Centre, Eston, owned by the MFC Foundation.

In preparation for the club's transition to Northern League status, Boro Rangers made plans to build a 4G pitch and stadium facilities at Saltersgill Avenue, Tollesby, on the grounds of Trinity Catholic College, Middlesbrough. As such, the club temporarily moved to New Ferens Park, Durham, in order to secure earlier eligibility for the Northern League. The club later relocated to Stokesley Sports Club F.C. as a temporary ground for the 2022-23 season, in which they secured promotion to the Northern League Division One.

In 2023, the club's move back to Middlesbrough was secured, when Phoenix Park, built on the site of Trinity Catholic College, Middlesbrough, was opened. The club saw its record attendance at Phoenix Park during the 2024-25 Northern League Division One playoffs, when 816 spectators watched the club's semi final tie with Newcastle Blue Star.

== Manager History ==
- Ben Wheatley: 2014 - 2026

== List of seasons ==
List of Boro Rangers Seasons
Season	League	P	W	D	L	GF	GA	Points	Position	Top Scorer
2014-15	TLD2	24	18	3	3	106	26	57	2nd (P)	Not known
2015-16	TLD1	30	26	3	1	125	26	81	1st	Not known
2016-17	TLD1	22	20	1	1	89	22	61	1st	Not known
2017-18	NRPD	24	21	0	3	116	28	63	1st	Not known
2018-19	NRPD	30	27	1	2	155	19	82	1st	Not known
2019-20	NRPD	22	20	2	0	104	19	62	1st	Not known
2020-21	NRPD	9	9	0	0	37	5	27	1st	Not known
2021-22	NRPD	26	23	1	2	138	14	70	1st (P)	Not known
2022-23	NLD2	40	28	9	3	97	34	93	1st (P)	Stuart Rose (17)
2023-24	NLD1	38	20	8	10	82	42	68	7th	Danny Lofts/Stuart Rose (10)
2024-25	NLD1	42	24	8	10	92	58	80	3rd	Stuart Rose (41)

Please note: TLD1/2 refer to Teesside Leagues Division 1 and 2, NRPD refer to the North Riding League Premier Division, NLD1/2 refer to Northern Leagues Division 1 and 12.

== Club Records ==
- Record attendance: 816, versus Newcastle Blue Star, 2024–25 Northern Football League playoff semi final, 25th April 2025

== Performance Records ==
- Best ever league finish: 3rd, 2024–25 Northern Football League
- FA Cup best performance: Preliminary round, 2024–25
- FA Vase best performance: First round, 2024–25

== Player Records ==
- Most goals in a league season: Stuart Rose, 41, 2024–25 Northern Football League
- Record goal scorer (Northern League only): Stuart Rose, 82, 2022 - present

== League Honours ==
Northern Football League Division Two

- Winners (1): 2022–23

North Riding League Premier Division

- Winners (5): 2017/18, 2018/19, 2019/20*, 2020/21*, 2021/22

Asterisks mark that season ended early due to the COVID-19 pandemic.

Teesside Football League Division One

- Winners (2): 2015/16, 2016/17

Teesside Football League Division Two

- Runners-Up (1): 2014/15

== Cup Honours ==
North Riding Saturday County Cup

- Winners (5): 2015-16, 2017-18, 2019-20, 2020-21, 2021-22

North Riding Saturday Challenge Cup

- Winners (1): 2014-15

North Riding Senior Cup

- Runners-Up (1): 2023/24

MacMillan Bowl

- Winners (3): 2015/16, 2017/18, 2018/19

Lou Moore Trophy

- Winners (1): 2017/18

JV Madden Trophy

- Winners (1): 2016/17

== Notable former players ==
The following players all represented Boro Rangers at youth level, prior to embarking on senior careers in professional, and semi-professional football:

- Macaulay Langstaff
- Liam Mandeville
- Law McCabe
- Callum Johnson
- Connor Simpson
