= Durham United F.C. =

English football club

Durham United
- Full name: Durham United Football Club
- Founded: 2012; 14 years ago
- Chairman: Mark Blackbourne
- League: Northern League Division Two
- 2025–26: Northern League Division Two, 16th of 22

Durham United Football Club is a football club based in Durham, England. They are currently members of the Northern League Division Two.

== History ==
Formed in 2012 as Durham Federation FC, the club was originally affiliated with the Durham Federation school. They subsequently developed several youth teams, working across the local community. In 2015, a change in the management at the school led to a split, and the club was renamed Durham United.

In 2021, they entered the Wearside League, winning promotion to the First Division (later renamed Premier Division) in 2022. They subsequently partnered with Durham University Football Club, playing home matches at the university's sports ground, the university team playing non-league football as Durham United's first team, and the university taking on the first team costs. The partnership both aimed to give leading university players experience of competing in non-league football, and to move up the divisions as Durham City's relegation from the Northern League had left Durham without a team in the national league system. This was subsequently achieved with the club winning the Wearside League and earning promotion to the Northern League in 2025.

=== Honours ===
- Wearside League Premier Division
  - Winnners 2024-25

=== Records ===
- FA Vase
  - Second round 2026-27

== Ground ==
Since 2022, they have played at the Graham Sports Centre, Durham, a facility owned by Durham University.
