= Seaton Carew F.C. =

Seaton Carew
- Full name: Seaton Carew Football Club
- Founded: 1998; 28 years ago
- Ground: Hornby Park, Seaton Carew
- League: Northern Football League Division Two
- 2025-26: Wearside League 1st (Promoted)

Seaton Carew F.C. is a football club based in Seaton Carew in the Borough of Hartlepool in County Durham, England. They play in the Northern Football League Division Two, having won promotion from the Wearside League as champions in 2026.

== History ==
The club was founded, by Bernie Kelly, in 1998 and grew as a community club with teams at junior and adult levels. The club played in black and white stripes from their foundation in 1998 until 2026, but switched to claret and gold, colours associated with other Seaton Carew sports teams, in 2026.

After playing in the Hartlepool Church & District League, the senior team first entered the Wearside League in 2012, but left in 2015. They re-entered the Wearside League in the 2023–24 season, and secured promotion to the Northern League as champions in 2026.

== Ground ==
Seaton Carew play at Hornby Park, the home of Seaton Carew Community and Sports. Hornby Park was first developed as a sports facility by Seaton Carew Cricket Club in 1973. In 2025, Seaton Carew FC announced proposals for the construction of a more substantial stadium at Hornby Park, which would allow them to play at a higher level.

== Honours ==
- Wearside League
  - Division One champions: 2025–26

== See also ==
- Seaton Carew F.C. players
