= A.F.C. Newbiggin =

English football club

AFC Newbiggin
- Full name: AFC Newbiggin
- Founded: 2011; 15 years ago
- Ground: Newbiggin Sports Centre
- Chairman: John Messenger
- Manager: Simon Wilson
- League: Northern League Division Two
- 2025–26: Northern League Division Two, 12th of 22
Home colours

AFC Newbiggin are a football club based in Newbiggin-by-the-Sea, England. They are currently members of the Northern League Division Two.

== History ==
Previous clubs from the north-east town of Newbiggin were, Newbiggin Colliery Welfare FC and Newbiggin Central Welfare FC dating back to 1911, with Central Welfare having folded at the end of the 2004-05 Northern Alliance League season.

AFC Newbiggin were founded in 2011 to fill the gap following Central Welfare's collapse, and joined the North Northumberland League and then the Division Two of the Northern Alliance in 2013.

The club’s first season in the Northern Alliance saw AFC Newbiggin miss out on the Division Two Championship on the final day, finishing runners-up two points behind champions Blyth Isabella.

The 2013-14 season also saw the team win the Northumberland Minor Cup for the first time beating North Shields Athletic 3-0 in the final.

Success followed in season 2014-15 when finishing runners-up in Division One seven points behind champions Percy Main Amateurs gaining promotion to the Premier Division for the first time.

In 2017 AFC Newbiggin created a reserve side that were placed in the North Northumberland League Division One, which in their first season finished runners-up.

The 2018 season proved difficult for the club, the first team found difficulty in recruitment with several players from the previous season moving on to clubs playing at higher levels, the decision was made to resign from the Northern Alliance but continue with the reserve side in the North Northumberland League for 2018-19.

At the beginning of the 2019-20 season the reserve side became the first team and rejoined the Northern Alliance being placed in Division Two, however after playing seventeen games the season was curtailed due to the Coronavirus Pandemic.

The following season 2020-21 only ten games were played but promotion was achieved via the Points Per Game ruling after a second successive campaign hit by Covid 19.

In the 2021-22 season, the club gained promotion from Division One after a 3rd place finish behind Newcastle Independent and Cramlington United, further success was gained by winning the Northumberland Minor Cup for a second time beating Newcastle North End 12-11 on penalties after the game finished 1-1.

The 2022-23 season saw the club win the Northern Alliance Challenge Cup after a 1-0 victory over Wallington.

Season 2024-25 saw the club finish runners-up in the Northern Alliance Premier Division behind champions Burradon & New Fordley and promotion to the Northern League, AFC Newbiggin did however beat the same opposition 4-1 in the Benevolent Bowl Final.

The club’s first season in the Northern Football League saw AFC Newbiggin finish a respectable 12th in Division Two.

== Ground ==
AFC Newbiggin have played at Newbiggin Sports Centre since they were founded, with the facilities upgraded in 2023.

After seeking to develop a new ground elsewhere in 2020, Newbiggin were able to expand the facilities at Newbiggin Sport Centre in 2023, creating the possibility of playing at a higher level.

In 2025, they were duly able to gain promotion to the Northern League after finishing second in the Northern Alliance Premier Division.

== Honours ==
Northern Alliance

- Second Division Runners-Up : 2013-14
- First Division Runners-Up : 2014-15
- Premier Division Runners-Up : 2024-25

Northumberland Minor Cup

- Winners : 2013-14, 2021-22
