= Newton Aycliffe F.C. =

Association football club in England

Newton Aycliffe Football Club
- Full name: Newton Aycliffe Football Club
- Nickname: The Cliffe
- Founded: 1965
- Ground: Moore Lane Sports Club
- Coordinates: 54°36′55″N 1°33′31″W
- Chairman: Allan Oliver
- Manager: Brian Atkinson
- League: Northern League Division One
- 2025–26: Northern Premier League Division One East, 21st of 22 (relegated)
- Website: newtonaycliffefc.co.uk
Home colours	Away colours

Newton Aycliffe Football Club is an English football club based in Newton Aycliffe, County Durham. The club's ground is Moore Lane Sports Club, known as The Ashcourt Stadium for the 2024/25 season for sponsorship reasons. As of 2024, the club play in the highest level they have ever reached, the Northern Premier League Division One East.

== History ==
The club joined the Wearside League in 1984–85 and spent just under a decade in that league, their best finish being in 1988–89 when they finished in seventh place. They folded in March of the 1993–94 season after picking up two points from their opening 20 games. The team competed in the FA Vase in every season, their best run being in 1991–92 when they got to the third round. The club reformed and played in local football before joining the Durham Alliance. They won that league in 2007–08 and joined the Wearside League. The club was elected into the Northern League for the 2009–10 season, after finishing first in their previous season in the Wearside Football League. Finishing in ninth place in their first season in the second division of the Northern League, they went on to become the Champions of the division with three games remaining. Having anticipated the possibility months before, the team were required to make more improvements to the home ground to be eligible to play in the First Division of the Northern League. Upon ensuring their place in the top division, they finished in ninth place and participated in the FA Cup for the first time.

The club remained in the Northern League First Division for the next twelve years, winning the Durham FA Challenge Cup in 2016. In the 2019/20 season the club finished in its highest league position of fifth, despite the season being declared void following the outbreak of COVID-19. The following season saw The Newtonians sitting in fifth place, once again, when that season was curtailed following the second lock down period. The following season saw Newton Aycliffe finish in fourth place in the table. The 2022/23 season saw the club win the First Division title and promotion to Step 4 having seen off the threat of big-spenders Ashington to win the championship by five points.

The club were promoted to the eighth tier in the 2022–23 season following becoming Division One Champions. The club reached the semi-finals of the Durham Challenge Cup in 2024 but were eventually knocked out by Whickham on penalties.

== Honours ==
- Durham Challenge Cup
  - Winners 2015–16
- Durham Alliance
  - Champions 2007–08
- Wearside League
  - Champions 2008–09
- Northern League Division One
  - Champions 2022–23
- Northern League Division Two
  - Champions 2010–11

== Records ==
- FA Cup
  - 2nd round qualifying 2015–16, 2024-25
- FA Vase
  - Third round 1991–92
- FA Trophy
  - First Round 2024-25
