= Darlington Town F.C. =

Association football club in England

Coordinates: 54°45′52.06″N 1°19′01.88″W

Darlington Town
- Full name: Darlington Town
- Nickname: The Town
- Founded: 2018
- Ground: Eastbourne Community Stadium Darlington
- Chairman: Norman Stephens
- Manager: Nathan Wilson/Grant Hickman.. Coach Gary Farley..
- League: Northern League Division Two
- 2025–26: Northern League Division Two, 13th of 22
Home colours

Darlington Town is a football club based in Darlington, in County Durham, England. The club was formed in 2018, taking the place in the Wearside League of the reserve side for Darlington F.C., which itself had formed by the movement in 2016 of Horden Colliery Welfare F.C. to Darlington.

They are currently members of the Northern League Division Two and play at Eastbourne Community Stadium in Darlington.

== History ==
Horden Colliery Welfare had been formed in 1908, and had competed from 1975 until 2013 in the Northern League, but were relegated to the Wearside League at the end of the 2012–13 season. In 2016, Horden Parish Council demanded that the club vacate their ground at Horden Welfare Park (where the club has been based since their inception in 1908). On 29 January of that year, a court case upheld the council's decision and the club has been ordered to vacate by 25 February 2016 as well as awarding them legal costs.

In October 2016, in order to save the club, it was announced that Horden would move 30 miles to Darlington to become the Reserve Team of National League North Club Darlington 1883. The changed their name to Darlington 1883 Reserves and play on the 4G Surface at Eastbourne Sports Complex in Darlington. Horden Chairman Norman Stephens said 'If the move had not have happened, Horden would have been dead by Xmas'. Norman Stephens and some of the playing staff have been retained by Darlington who took Horden's place in the Wearside League. They played their first game under the new name on 6 October in a 1–0 away defeat to Boldon C.A. and played their first home game against Annfield Plain on 15 October at Eastbourne Sports Complex. The club signed its first international player in January 2018 when Gibraltar under-21 player Richie Parral joined the club.

In 2018, the club separated from Darlington 1883, and became known as Darlington Town, taking the reserve team's place in the Wearside League. They won their first championship in 2021, taking the league with a 19–0 victory over Annfield Plain.

In May 2024, Town moved to a different pitch at the Eastbourne Complex, complete with a seated stand, allowing them to be promoted to the Northern Football League Second Division for the 2024/5 season.

The club no longer wear the black and red of Horden CW, but plays in white shirts and black shorts.

== Honours ==
- Wearside League 2021–22.
