= Birtley Town F.C. =

Association football club in England

Coordinates: 54°53′16.3″N 1°34′50.6″W

Birtley Town
- Full name: Birtley Town Football Club
- Nickname: The Hoops
- Ground: Birtley Sports Complex, Birtley
- Chairman: Paul Beat
- Manager: Paul Foster
- League: Northern League Division One
- 2025–26: Northern League Division One, 10th of 19
Home colours

Birtley Town Football Club is a football club based in Birtley, Tyne and Wear, England. They are currently members of the Northern League Division One and play at the Birtley Sports Complex.

== History ==
The original Birtley Football Club were founder members of the Northern League in 1889. However, they left after finishing second-from-bottom of the league in its inaugural season. The club then joined the Northern Alliance, again leaving after a single season. They rejoined the alliance in 1895 and finished bottom of the league in 1897–98, before leaving again in 1900. The club returned for a third spell in the league in 1909, and were runners-up in 1913–14. After World War I, they were champions in 1923–24,

In 1926 the Northern Alliance merged into the North Eastern League, with Birtley becoming members of Division Two. They remained in the North Eastern League until transferring to the Wearside League in 1935. Following World War II the club was renamed Birtley Town, and went on to win the Wearside League in 1945–46. However, after finishing bottom of the league in 1949–50, 1950–51 and 1951–52, the club dropped out of the league.

A new Birtley Town was established in the early 1990s and joined Division Two of the Wearside League in 1992. They were Division Two champions in 1994–95, earning promotion to Division One. In 1997–98 the club won the League Cup, and in 2001–02 they won both the League Cup and the Monkwearmouth Charity Cup. The following season saw the club win the Wearside League title. After finishing as runners-up in 2003–04 and 2004–05 and winning the League Cup for a third time in 2005–06, they were champions again in 2006–07, resulting in promotion to Division Two of the Northern League.

In 2009–10 Birtley finished bottom of Division Two, but were not relegated. However, in 2015–16 the club finished second-from-bottom of the division and were relegated to the Premier Division of the Northern Alliance. They were Premier Division runners-up and League Cup winners in 2017–18, and were promoted back to Division Two of the Northern League. The 2022–23 season saw the club finish fifth in Division Two, qualifying for the promotion play-offs. After defeating Horden Community Welfare 5–4 on penalties (after a 2–2 draw) in the semi-finals, they won the final against Billingham Town on penalties after another 2–2 draw, earning promotion to Division One. The club went on to finish fourth in Division One the following season, qualifying for the play-offs again. However, they were beaten 1–0 in the semi-finals by Heaton Stannington.

== Honours ==
- Wearside League
  - Champions 2002–03, 2006–07
  - Division Two champions 1994–95
  - League Cup winners 1997–98, 2001–02, 2005–06
- Northern Alliance
  - League Cup winners 2017–18
- Monkwearmouth Cup
  - Winners 2001–02

== Records ==
- Best FA Cup performance: First qualifying round, 2024–25
- Best FA Vase performance: Second round, 2021–22

== See also ==
- Birtley Town F.C. players
