= FC Hartlepool =

Coordinates: 54°41′41.9″N 1°13′44.2″W

- Full name: Football Club Hartlepool
- Nickname: FC
- Founded: 1993; 33 years ago
- Ground: Grayfields Enclosure, Hartlepool
- Chairman: Salaam Shaheen
- Manager: Terry Hill
- League: Northern League Division Two
- 2025–26: Northern League Division Two, 4th of 22

FC Hartlepool is a semi-professional football club based in Hartlepool, England. They are currently members of the Northern League Division Two and play at Grayfields Enclosure in Hartlepool.

== History ==
FC Hartlepool were formed in 1993 and were originally known as The Fens Hotel FC. In 2002, the club was renamed as Teesside Arriva due to a sponsorship deal from Arriva who provided the club with minibuses for away games. In summer 2003, the club changed names again and were now known as Hartlepool FC.

In their first season as Hartlepool, the club won the Teesside League. They joined the Wearside League in the 2006–07 season.

In 2019, the club rebranded and changed their name to FC Hartlepool. In the 2022–23 season, they won the Wearside League which saw the club promoted to the Northern League Division Two for the first time. This made them the first side to play in the Northern League within Hartlepool since Hartlepool United Reserves in 1987 – while the defunct Hartlepool Town were in the league for the 1994–95 season, they played their home games in Ferryhill.

== Ground ==
FC Hartlepool play their home games at Grayfields Enclosure. They took over the site from Hartlepool Borough Council in 2021. In February 2022, they opened a new clubhouse which is a fully functioning sports bar open seven days a week. In April 2023, the club put up floodlights and built a 63-seater stand so the ground could meet the grading inspection to host Northern League games. The club had two new stands installed during their maiden Northern League season.

== Honours ==
- Teesside League
  - Division Two promotion 2002–03
  - Division One champions 2003–04
- Wearside League
  - Division One champions 2023–24
- Wearside League Cup
  - Winners 2017–18

== Records ==
- Record attendance: 1,516 vs Hartlepool United, pre-season friendly, 8 July 2025
- Best FA Vase performance: Second round, 2024–25

== See also ==
- FC Hartlepool players
