= Yarm & Eaglescliffe F.C. =

Yarm & Eaglescliffe
- Full name: Yarm & Eaglescliffe Football Club
- Founded: 2017; 9 years ago
- Ground: Bedford Terrace, Billingham
- Capacity: 3,000 (173 seated)
- Coordinates: 54°36′8″N 1°17′9″W
- Chairman: James Francis
- Manager: Stephen Jackson
- League: Northern League Division One
- 2025–26: Northern League Division Two, 2nd of 22 (promoted via play-offs)
Home colours

Yarm & Eaglescliffe Football Club is a football club based in Yarm, England. They are currently members of the Northern League Division One and play at Bedford Terrace, Billingham, groundsharing with Billingham Town.

== History ==
In 2017, Yarm & Eaglescliffe were formed as a response to the lack of senior football clubs in the area, joining the newly formed North Riding League. In the club's first season, they finished ninth in the Premier Division. In Yarm & Eaglescliffe's second season, the club won the North Riding Saturday County Cup. In 2023, the club was admitted into the Northern League Division Two.

On 29 April 2026, the club won their first North Riding Senior Cup at the Riverside Stadium in Middlesbrough. The game finished goalless in regulation time. Yarm & Eaglescliffe won the resulting penalty shoot-out 4–1 in front of 1,617 supporters from both clubs.

== Ground ==
Yarm & Eaglescliffe initially played at Conyers' School in Yarm. In 2022, the club began a groundsharing agreement with Billingham Town to play at Bedford Terrace.

== Records ==
- Best FA Cup performance: Extra preliminary round, 2026–27 (replay)
- Best FA Vase performance: Third round, 2026–27
