= North Riding Football League =

Association football league in England

- Organising body: North Riding County Football Association
- Founded: 2017
- Country: England
- Number of clubs: Men's: 32; 14 (Premier Division); 11 (Division One); 12 (Division Two); Women's: 17 (Premier Division)
- Level on pyramid: Level 11 (Premier Division)
- Promotion to: Level 10; Northern Football League
- Domestic cup(s): League; League Cup
- Current champions: Yarm & Eaglescliffe Reserves (Premier Division); North Ormesby (Division One); Northallerton Town Reserves (Division Two); TBD (Women's Premier) (2024–25)
- Website: Official site

The North Riding Football League is an English football league that was founded in 2017 by the merger of the former Teesside Football League and Eskvale & Cleveland League.

The league has three divisions – the Premier Division (which stands at level 11 of the English football league system), Division One and Women's Premier Division. The men's regional team won the 2017-18 FA Inter-League Cup, which qualified the team for the 2019 UEFA Regions' Cup.

As of August 2024, four clubs have been promoted from the league into the National League System, Redcar Town, Boro Rangers, Yarm & Eaglescliffe and Grangetown Boys Club

== Current member clubs (2024-25) ==
=== Premier Division ===
- Boro Rangers U23
- Darlington R.A. Seniors
- Fishburn Park
- Great Ayton United
- Guisborough Town Reserves
- Kader FC
- Lealholm
- Redcar Athletic Reserves
- Redcar Town Reserves
- St Marys 1947 Dormans
- Staithes Athletic
- Stokesley Sports Club
- T.I.B.S FC
- Yarm & Eaglescliffe Reserves
Location of teams in the North Riding Football League
– Premier Division – First Division
– Second Division
- Women's Premier Division - Teams that have a male counterpart share the same mark if sharing the ground

=== Division One ===
- Billingham Town Development
- Boro Rangers U21
- Heighington FC
- Kader Development
- Linthorpe Academicals FC
- Marske United Reserves
- North Ormsby FC
- Richmond Town Reserves
- Thirsk Falcons
- Whinney Banks YCC
- Whitby Fishermen's Society

=== Division Two ===
- Bedale AFC
- Haughton Le Skerne
- Grangetown Boys Club Reserves
- New Marske FC
- Normanby United
- Northallerton Town Reserves
- Saltburn Athletic
- South Park Rangers Development
- Tees FC
- Thornaby Town FC
- Whitby Fishermen's Society
- Yarm & Eaglescliffe U21

=== Women's Premier ===
- Boro Rangers Women
- Catterick Village Roses Ladies
- Guisborough Town Ladies
- Huntington Rovers Ladies
- Linthorpe Academicals Women
- Linthorpe Academicals Women Development
- Northallerton Town Women
- Old Malton St. Mary's Ladies
- Redcar Athletic Ladies
- Redcar Town Ladies Development
- Richmond Town Women
- Skelton United Ladies
- South Park Rangers Women
- Scarborough Sirens
- T.I.B.S Women
- Wigginton Grasshoppers Women
- York Railway Institute Ladies Reserves

== Champions ==
Men's:

Season	Premier Division	Division One	Division Two	Division One East	Division One West
2017–18	Boro Rangers	Bedale	N/A	N/A	N/A
2018–19	Boro Rangers	Thirsk Falcons	N/A	N/A	N/A
2021-22	Boro Rangers	N/A	N/A	South Park Rangers	Cleveland
2022-23	Redcar Newmarket	Lealholm	N/A	N/A	N/A
2023-24	Darlington United	Yarm & Eaglescliffe Reserves	N/A	N/A	N/A
2024-25	Yarm & Eaglescliffe Reserves	North Ormesby	Northallerton Town Reserves	N/A	N/A
2025-26	Stokesley Sports Club	Linthorpe Academicals			

Women's:

Season	Premier Division
2021-22	Redcar Town Ladies Reserves
2022-23	York City Development
2023-24	York City Ladies U23
2024/25	TBD
