= Washington F.C. =

Football club based in Washington, Tyne and Wear, England

Coordinates: 54°55′41.8″N 1°31′12.7″W

Washington
- Full name: Washington Football Club
- Nickname: The Mechanics
- Founded: 1947
- Ground: Northern Playing Fields, Washington
- Manager: Mark Gibbon
- League: Wearside League Premier Division
- 2025–26: Wearside League Premier Division, 3rd of 16
Home colours	Away colours

Washington Football Club is a football club based in Washington, Tyne and Wear, England. The club was formed by miners at the local "F-Pit" Colliery in the early 20th century as Washington Colliery F.C. The club's distinctive red colours were agreed upon on formation and a codicil written making the team strip of red shirts being in existence in perpetuity. The modern club was established in 1947 and joined the Wearside League in 1968. In the 1977–78 season, they reached the third round of the FA Vase. The club won promotion to the Northern Football League Division One after winning their last seven games of the 2014–15 season. It was their highest league standing since the 2003–04 season.

== History ==
Washington Colliery 1917–18 season

Little is known of the club prior to 1926–27 when the club became a founder member of North Eastern League where they were placed in the second division. Prior to this, it was known the club did exist but mainly in playing friendlies against other local pits such as Usworth Colliery. A notable player from the early era was Ronnie Starling, who went on to captain Sheffield Wednesday to the FA Cup and won two caps for England.

The club won the Division 2 title in the 1927–28 season and were promoted to division one but didn't enjoy much success. This period, however, did produce their most famous son, Jimmy Hagan, who went on to represent England (winning one full international cap against Denmark in Copenhagen in 1948). He later managed the famous Benfica team that won three successive Portuguese championships between 1971 and 1973. He was also briefly manager of Sporting CP during the 1976–77 season.

After the war the club were re-founded as Washington Colliery Mechanics and joined the Washington and District football league (known as the Durham Alliance league from 1996), with the club managing a great amount of success in the 1950s including winning the league title five consecutive seasons, and the coveted Durham Trophy. The Colliery stayed in the league until 1964 when they moved to the Northern Alliance League. Their tenure in that league lasted only one year where then club secretary Billy Benson was successful in applying to become a member of the Wearside League under the name Washington F.C.. Their greatest moment was in 1970–71 reaching the FA Cup 4th qualifying round where they were defeated 3–0 by professional league team Bradford Park Avenue. Currently Washington play in the Northern league and are semi-professional with paid players.

The football club has faced financial hardship due in part to having its changing rooms burnt in an arson attack in 2009; and with league rules stating each team should provide suitable facilities for home and away teams they have had to rely on the help of teams in the two divisions of the Northern Football League until financial support is provided within the club. These problems caused the club to abandon its Albany Park home during the 2010–11 season and take up residence at the Nissan Sports and Leisure Complex in Sunderland, the former home of Northern League rivals Sunderland Nissan, who folded in 2009.

September 2013. Steven Hutchinson appointed manager. Washington finished the season 2013–14 with a defeat in the Ernest Armstrong Cup losing 1–0 to Jarrow Roofing. Season 2014–15 Washington finished runners-up and were promoted into the First Division.

Throughout the 2015–16 and 2016–17 Washington was forced to change managers on several occasions and the club struggled to have a consistent run of form. In December 2016, following the departure of Neil Hixon on the back of 5 defeats, Richie Latimer was appointed as First Team Manager. Latimer appointed experienced Northern League coach James Clark as assistant manager. In February 2017, due to work commitments and personal circumstances, Richie Latimer was forced to step down as Manager. Clark was appointed as First Team Manager with assistance from Player Coach Michael Laws.

At the end of the 2016–17 season, due to lack volunteers of running the club, notice was submitted to the Northern Football League for the club to withdraw its membership for the 2017–18 season. An appeal was subsequently made in the local press/social media etc., to find help to take over/assist with the administration of the club.. Following discussions with the Committee of Washington Association Football Club - a Community Club with a pathway of 50 youth teams. Washington FC merged with Washington AFC with the volunteers needed to keep the Club afloat.

During the season 2022/ 23 Washington FC returned home to Washington following spells at various grounds following the sale of Spout Lane to houses.

== Achievements ==
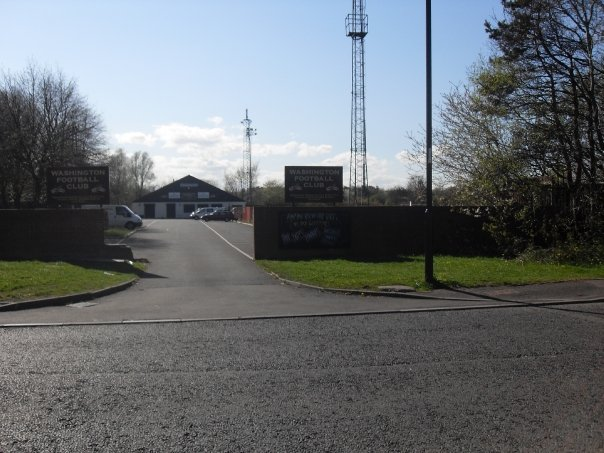
The entrance to the club

Washington Colliery 2006/07 season

- North Eastern League Division 2 Champions: 1927/28
- Gateshead Charity Cup: 1955–56
- Chester-Le-Street Aged Miners Cup: 1956–57
- Washington League Challenge Cup: 1955–56, 1958–59, 1960–61, 1964–65
- Washington Aged Miners Cup Winners: 1955–56, 1958–59, 1962–63
- Washington Amateur League Champions: 1955–56, 1956–57, 1957–58, 1958–59, 1959–60, 1961–62, 1962–63 Runners Up: 1960–61
- Durham Trophy: 1956–57, 1960–61, Runners-Up 1962–63
- Washington Aged People's Cup: 1960–61, 1961–62, 1962–63, 1963–64, 1965–66
- Wearside League: Runners-Up: 1966–67, 1974–75
- Sunderland Shipowners Cup: Runners-Up 1971–72
- Wearside League Challenge Cup: Runners-Up 1973–74
- Northern League Div 2: Runners-Up 2000–01, 2014–15; 3rd Place 2006–07
