= Stokesley Sports Club F.C. =

Association football club in England

Coordinates: 54°28′04.79″N 1°10′42.29″W

Stokesley Sports Club
- Full name: Stokesley Sports Club Football Club
- Nickname: Stowsla
- Founded: 1920
- Ground: Stokesley Sports Club, Stokesley
- Capacity: 2,000
- Chairman: Ted Watts
- Manager: James Hunter
- League: Northern League Division Two
- 2025–26: North Riding League Premier Division, 1st of 12 (promoted)
Home colours

Stokesley Sports Club Football Club is a football club based in Stokesley, North Yorkshire, England. They are currently members of the Northern League Division Two and play at the Stokesley Sports Club.

== History ==
Formed in 1920, the club spent most of the 20th century participating in local leagues before joining the Teesside League in 1994 before progressing to the Wearside League in 1999. Seven years later the club was accepted into the Northern League.

In each of their first two seasons at the higher level, Stokesley finished near the middle of the table. Promotion has also enabled the club to participate in national competitions - in the FA Vase their best performance came in 2008–09 when they reached the Second Round, and during the same season they made their debut in the FA Cup, beating Washington in the Extra Preliminary round before losing to Wakefield in the preliminary round.

In the summer of 2009 the club changed their name to Stokesley Football Club.

In 2009–10 the club became champions of the Northern League Second Division and gained promotion to the First Division for the first time in the club's history. They scored in every league game and had the league's top scorer in Andrew Jennings.

In 2009 the club's under-13 team won the national Tesco Cup.

In season 2010–11 the club finished 16th in division 1, but following the season the manager, chairman and secretary as well as the rest of the committee resigned quoting a lack of support from the sports club. Renamed Stokesley Sports Club FC, in 2011, a new team was appointed under the leadership of manager Monty Alexander. In the 2011–12 season Stokesley were relegated back to Division Two after finishing the season with 4 points and not having won a single game.

In the 2015–16 season, Stokesley were relegated into the Wearside League. Despite ending the season on a high, winning two of their final three games, Stokesley finished on 14 points, collecting just a single point away from home, finishing bottom of the table. Season 2018-19 saw the Wearside League and the abandoned Teesside League combine and reform into two new leagues - the Wearside League and the North Riding League. Stokesley joined the North Riding League Premier Division. A new manager was employed for the 2019–20 season, Steve Todd who had just brought his team up from Division One.

With the 2019–20 season being expunged by The FA, the season was void. Due to a disagreement with the committee Steve Todd and his team resigned taking his players with him.

Following the resignation of Steve Todd, David Howe was appointed as manager bringing his team from Stokesley Athletic with him.

After a year and a half in charge Howe stepped down as manager as he and the club chairman Ted Watts decided it was time for a change. Following that decision, first team coach Dan Boswell was named manager on 17 September 2021.

After three years and seven months in charge, Boswell told the club about his intention to resign as manager. The club named the former Grangetown Boys Club manager, James Hunter, as the new first team manager on 8 May 2025. Hunter brought a coaching team of Harry Taylor, Andrew Dorchell and Kris York with him.

== Honours ==
Stokesley Sports Club's honours
Competition		Position	Season
Northern League	Division Two	Champions	2009-10
Wearside League	Premier Division	Runners-up	2005-06
Wearside League	Division Two	Runners-up	1999-2000

== Records ==
- FA Cup
  - Preliminary round 2008–09, 2009–10
- FA Vase
  - Second Round 2008–09, 2010–11

== Non-playing staff ==
=== Coaching staff ===
Position	Name
Manager	James Hunter
Assistant manager	Harry Taylor
Coach	Andrew Dorchell
Coach	Kris York
