= Boldon Community Association F.C. =

Coordinates: 54.951008°N 1.460143°W

Boldon Community Association
- Full name: Boldon Community Association Football Club
- Short name: Boldon
- Founded: 1892
- Ground: Boldon Colliery Welfare Ground, Boldon Colliery, NE35 9AN
- Chairman: Mal Cooper
- Manager: Chris Spence
- League: Northern League Division Two
- 2025–26: Northern League Division Two, 20th of 22

Boldon Community Association F.C. is an association football club that plays in the Northern League Division Two. The club was founded as Boldon Villa, joining the Wearside Football League as a founder member in 1892. They were later known as Boldon Villa and Boldon Colliery Welfare. In 1976 the club name was renamed Boldon Community Association. The league title was won in 1953, 1955, 1975 and 1997 They were promoted from the Wearside League to the Northern League in 2021. They made their debut in the Northern Football League in 1–1 draw with Horden Community Welfare.

Goalkeeper Sam Bartram played for the club before joining Charlton Athletic.

== Club History ==
In 1992, when Boldon CAFC joined the Wearside league, the club gained its century and was presented with a certificate from the FA, and signed by its chief executive, Graham Kelly.

Boldon were one of the founder members of the Wearside League in 1892 as Boldon Star FC, and played for 5 seasons until they resigned in January 1898.

Boldon's next short appearance in the league was for 6 months in the 1939/40 season but resigned at the outbreak of the war. After the war, Boldon re-joined the League in the 1946/47 season. In the following season, 'The Villa' changed their name to Boldon Colliery Welfare FC.

Boldon were crowned champions in 1952/53 and 1954/55. They waited until 1974/75 before repeating this.

1976/77 the club changed name to the current one of Boldon Community Association, and had to wait until 1996/97 to lift the title for the final time.

At the end of the 2016/17 seasoned, the club completed 67 continuous years of service to the wearside league. On the honours front the club have won the Shipowners Charity cup 7 tikes, and the League challenge cup 3 times. In the 2017 season, the club celebrated the 125th anniversary of 'Boldon Star' entering into the inaugural Wearside League of 1892.

In the 2020/21 season, Boldon CAFC topped the Wearside League by 15 points when the season was paused by COVID-19. After a successful appeal to the FA, David Crumbie's team saw Boldon CAFC promoted to the Northern League Division 2 for the 2021/22 season, for the first time in the clubs history.

In the clubs first season in the EBAC Northern League 2, they reached the playoffs, losing in the Semi Finals to Tow Law town by two goals to nil.

In the first half of the 2023/24 season, it was announced head coach David Crumbie, who had coached the side for years would step down. He was replaced by Gary Henry.

== Records ==
- FA Vase
  - Third round 1978–79, 2026-27
