= Redcar Town F.C. =

Redcar Town
- Full name: Redcar Town Football Club
- Founded: 1997; 29 years ago
- Ground: Mo Mowlam Memorial Park, Redcar
- Coordinates: 54°36′41″N 1°5′23″W
- Chairman: Gary Wheatley
- Manager: Mitch Morris & James Smuk
- League: Northern League Division One
- 2025–26: Northern League Division Two, 1st of 22 (promoted)
Home colours

Redcar Town Football Club is a football club based in Redcar, England. They are currently members of the Northern League Division One and play at the Mo Mowlam Memorial Park, Redcar.

== History ==
The men's Redcar Town team were formed in 2014, being placed in the Teesside League Division Two, winning promotion to Division One in their first season. Prior to the current Redcar Town forming, a team by the same name competed in the Wearside League between 1998 and 2003. In 2017, Redcar joined the North Riding League, following the Teesside League merging with the Eskvale & Cleveland League.

In 2021, the club was admitted into the Northern League Division Two. Redcar Town entered the FA Vase for the first time in 2021–22. The 2025–26 season saw the club promoted to Division One as champions.

== Ground ==
The club currently play at the Mo Mowlam Memorial Park in Redcar.

== Former players ==
The club has produced a number of notable players who have gone on to become professionals - most recently Middlesbrough midfielder and England Under-21 international Hayden Hackney.

They have also produced Richard Smallwood, Jordan Jones, Lewis Maloney and Brad Halliday.

== Records ==
- Best FA Cup performance: Second qualifying round, 2026–27
- Best FA Vase performance: Second round, 2021–22, 2025–26

== Honours ==
- Northern Football League
  - Division Two champions: 2025–26

== See also ==
- Redcar Athletic F.C.
