= Whickham F.C. =

Association football club in Whickham, England

Whickham
- Full name: Whickham Football Club
- Nickname: The Lang Jacks or The Home Guard
- Founded: 1944
- Ground: The Glebe Sports Ground, Whickham
- Capacity: 4,000
- Coordinates: 54°56′37″N 1°40′49″W
- Chairman: Ross Gregory
- Manager: David Palmer and Dan Crooks
- League: Northern League Division One
- 2025–26: Northern League Division One, 18th of 19
- Website: https://whickhamfc.com
Home colours

Whickham Football Club are an English football club based in Whickham, Tyne and Wear, playing in the Northern League Division One in the English football league system. They won the FA Vase in 1981.

The team plays its home matches at the Glebe Sports Ground, Rose Avenue, Whickham.

== History ==
Founded in 1944 as Axwell Park Colliery Welfare, the club first started playing in the Derwent Valley League. In 1974, they joined the Wearside League, and were league champions in two seasons, 1977–78 and 1987–88. The year 1981 was one of the most successful years in the club's history, when they beat Willenhall Town 3–2 in the final, after going 0–2 down, to win the FA Vase. At the start of 1988–89, they moved up to the Northern League Division Two. The first season saw them finishing third in the league, and they were promoted to Division One. 1991–92 saw them relegated back to Division Two. In 1995, they were promoted again, as league champions, but after relegation in 1997, spent 20 seasons in Division Two, winning promotion back to Northern League 1 in 2017–18

By far the best run in the FA Cup for Whickham came during the 2003–04 season. In that season they won 3–0 at Garforth Town, 2–1 at Hebburn Town (in a replay), 2–1 at home to Armthorpe Welfare (again after a replay) before accumulating a 5–0 defeat at the hands of Chorley in the 2nd qualifying round.

In their first season back in Northern League Division One in 2018–19, it was a difficult campaign for the Lang Jacks, who finished with just enough points to remain in the division.

In the 2021-22 Season a slow start to the campaign was halted with the appointment of Tony Fawcett and some new faces to the squad and the resurgent Lang Jack's marched up the Northern League 1 table finishing in a club record 7th position.

== Squad ==
Note: Flags indicate national team as defined under FIFA eligibility rules; some limited exceptions apply. Players may hold more than one non-FIFA nationality.

No.	Pos.	Nation	Player
—	GK	ENG	Neal Bussey
—	GK	ENG	Matthew Wilkinson
—	DF	ENG	Callum Munro
—	DF	ENG	Dom Agnew
—	DF	ENG	Max Nelson
—	DF	ENG	Jordan Lavery
—	DF	ENG	Kyle Errington
—	DF	ENG	Christian Lynn
—	MF	ENG	Dom Moan
—	MF	ENG	Nathan Stephenson
—	MF	ENG	Finlay Neary
—	MF	ENG	Aaron Croft
—	MF	ENG	Harvey Smith
—	MF	ENG	Ross Peareth
—	FW	ENG	Lucas Lowery
—	FW	ENG	Mason Hardy
—	FW	ENG	Cameron Brewis
—	FW	ENG	Daniel Marriott
—	FW	ENG	Bailey Geliher
—	FW	ENG	Adam Lennox

== Committee ==
Position	Name
President	Brian McCartney
Chairperson	Ross Gregory
Vice-chairperson and secretary	Lynn Ready
Commercial director	Ben Riley
Treasurer	Alan Walton
Committee/Groundsman	Steve Peareth
Committee/Groundsman	John Curry
Head of Operations	Danny Henderson
Welfare Officer	Daniel Armory
Assistant Secretary	Joe Preston
Committee	Kris Holmes
Committee	Sam Harrison
Committee	Paul Cavanagh
Head of Media	Freddie Armstrong

== Notable former players ==
- Matty Pattison, former Newcastle United, Norwich and South Africa International
- Richard Brodie, currently coach at North West Counties League club Ashton Athletic
- David Rayner Now retired and runs his own sports business in New Zealand.

== Honours ==
- Ernest Armstrong Memorial Cup
  - Winners 2006–07
- Durham Challenge Cup
  - Winners 2005–06
- FA Vase
  - Winners 1980–81
- Wearside League Cup
  - Winners 1986–87
- Wearside League
  - Winners 1977–78
- Northern Combination
  - Winners 1969–70, 1972–73, 1973–74
- Northern Combination League Cup
  - Winners 1960–61, 1973–74
- Northern League Division Two
  - Champions 1994–95
- Vaux Challenge Cup
  - Winners 1986–87

== Records ==
- Best league performance: 1st in Wearside League, 1977–78, 1987–88; 7th in Northern League Division 1, 2021–22; 1st in Northern League Division Two, 1994–95
- Best FA Cup performance: 2nd round qualifying, 1995–96, 2003–04
- Best FA Trophy performance: 1st round qualifying, 1990–91, 1991–92
- Best FA Vase performance: Winners 1980–81
