= Jarrow F.C. =

Association football club in England

Coordinates: 54.960992°N 1.4702287°W

Jarrow
- Full name: Jarrow Football Club
- Ground: Perth Green, Jarrow
- Manager: Kennie Malia
- League: Northern League Division Two
- 2024–25: Northern League Division Two, 3rd of 22
- Website: https://www.jarrowfc.co.uk/
Home colours

Jarrow Football Club is a football club based in Jarrow, Tyne and Wear, England. They are currently members of the Northern League Division Two.

== History ==
The original Jarrow club was formed in 1894 after Jarrow Rangers folded; a year after it was disbanded in 1902, a new Jarrow F.C. emerged, which lasted until 1909. The current club is a continuation of a club originally known as Jarrow Croft Villa.

In 1900–01, under the simpler name Jarrow Croft, the club won the South Shields Junior League in contentious circumstances, with rival club Regent Athletic also laying claim to the title; after the league resolved the matter in favour of Jarrow Croft, a Regent Athletic member, Thomas McClasham, beat up the league secretary, and destroyed his hat, for which he was fined £2. The club won the Northern Amateur League in 1903–04 having only lost a single match, before winning the Newcastle Amateur League in 1909–10. In 1910–11 it joined the North Eastern League.

The club was renamed Jarrow in 1912, and for the first two years of World War I they played in the North Eastern League–Tyneside Combination. After the war the club were renamed Palmers Jarrow, before reverting to simply Jarrow in March 1920. They finished bottom of the North Eastern League in 1923–24, and moved to Campbell Park in Hebburn the following season; plans to rename themselves Jarrow and Hebburn were dropped after the Durham FA refused permission. In 1930–31 the club reached the first round of the FA Cup for the first time, losing 1–0 at Third Division North club Crewe Alexandra.

Jarrow won the Durham Challenge Cup in 1932–33, beating Spennymoor United 2–1 in the final. They retained the trophy the following season with a 1–0 win over Cockfield in the final and were also North Eastern League runners-up. The loss of their Campbell Park ground to the army in March 1939 led to the club resigning from the league at the end of the 1938–39 season. After World War II Jarrow rejoined the Northern Alliance, but they withdrew from the league during the 1948–49 season after 23 matches. They dropped into the Northern Combination and subsequently disappeared.

The club was reformed in 1980. They joined Division Two of the Wearside League in 1991 and a third-place finish in 1992–93 saw them promoted to Division One. However, they finished bottom of Division One the following season and were relegated back to Division Two. The league was reduced to a single division in 1996 and the club finished bottom of the league in 1996–97. A second division was readded in 1998 and Jarrow finished bottom of Division One in 1999–2000, but avoided relegation as the league was reduced to a single division again. In 2007–08 Jarrow were Wearside League runners-up. They won the league in 2016–17, earning promotion to Division Two of the Northern League.

== Ground ==
The original Jarrow initially played at a cycle track at Monkton, which had been opened by Jarrow Amateur Bicycling Club in 1891. The ground became known as the Monkton Stadium and was taken over by the Jarrow Cycling, Athletic and Football Ground Company Limited in 1896. Jarrow Croft played at Simonside, before moving to Monkton in 1909, and Jarrow Caledonian's Curlew Road ground in 1913. In the early 1920s the club built a new 15,000-capacity ground in nearby Hebburn named Campbell Park, with the first match played there on 1 September 1924, a 1–1 draw with Newcastle United. In 1939 the ground was commandeered by the army for conversion into a drill hall for the 87th Anti-Aircraft Regiment. After the war the club returned to the Monkston Stadium.

== Honours ==
- Wearside League
  - Champions 2016–17
- Newcastle Amateur League
  - Champions 1909–10
- Northern Amateur League
  - Champions 1903–04
- South Shield Junior League
  - Champions 1900–01
- Durham Challenge Cup
  - Winners 1932–33, 1933–34

== Records ==
- Best FA Cup performance: First round, 1930–31

== See also ==
- Jarrow F.C. players
- Jarrow F.C. managers
