= 2025 FA Trophy final =

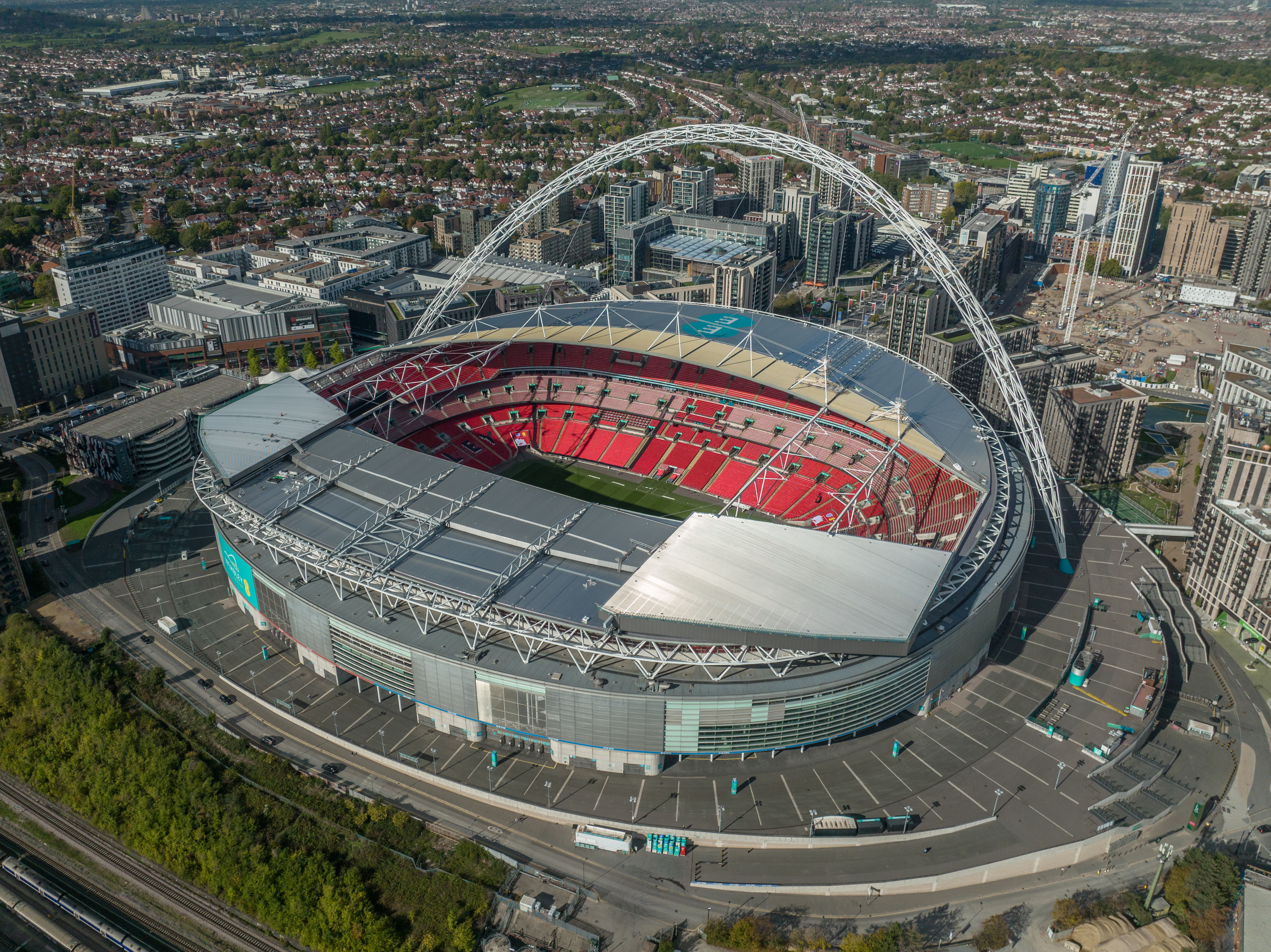
- Wembley Stadium hosted the final
- Event: 2024–25 FA Trophy
Aldershot Town	Spennymoor Town
3	0
- Date: 11 May 2025
- Venue: Wembley Stadium, London
- Man of the Match: Jack Barham (Aldershot Town)
- Referee: Lewis Smith (Lancashire)
- Attendance: 38,600

The 2025 FA Trophy final was an association football match played at Wembley Stadium, London, on 11 May 2025. It was the 56th FA Trophy final and was contested between Aldershot Town and Spennymoor Town. It was both teams's first final in the competition. Due to sponsorship by Isuzu, the final was officially named the Isuzu FA Trophy Final.

As part of Non-League Finals Day, the FA Vase final was played earlier in the same day at the same venue. The match was televised on TNT Sports 4 and available for streaming on Discovery+.

Aldershot won the game 3–0 to win the trophy for the first time.

== Route to the final ==
=== Aldershot Town ===
7 December 2024 3R	Aldershot Town	3–1	Wealdstone	Aldershot
15:00 GMT	Barrett 50'; A. Jones 68'; Mullins 90'	Report	Cesay 55'	Stadium: Recreation Ground; Attendance: 1,172

4 January 2025 4R	Aldershot Town	8–0	Chertsey Town	Aldershot
15:00 GMT	Maghoma 6'; Henry 11'; R. Jones 25'; Corbett 71', 85', 90+1'; Stuttle 83', 88'			Stadium: Recreation Ground; Attendance: 1,721

1 February 2025 5R	Aldershot Town	2–0	Boreham Wood	Aldershot
15:00 GMT	Barham 62'; Corbett 77'			Stadium: Recreation Ground; Attendance: 1,647

3 January 2025 QF	Sittingbourne	0–3	Aldershot Town	Sittingbourne
12:30 GMT			R. Jones 45+1'; Armitage 76'; Frost 87'	Stadium: The Staxson Stadium; Attendance: 1,600

5 April 2025 SF	Aldershot Town	2–1	Woking	Aldershot
12:30 BST	Henry 75' (pen.); Barham 90+3'		Walker 55'	Stadium: Recreation Ground; Attendance: 7,058

=== Spennymoor Town ===
16 November 2024 2R	Spennymoor Town	2–1	South Shields	Spennymoor
15:00 GMT	Ramshaw 28'; Allan 38'	Report	Jenkins 8'	Stadium: The Brewery Field; Attendance: 1,052

7 December 2024 3R	Alfreton Town	0–1	Spennymoor Town	Alfreton
15:00 GMT		Report	Dolan 86'	Stadium: North Street; Attendance: 231

4 January 2025 4R	Hampton & Richmond Borough	0–2	Spennymoor Town	Hampton, London
15:00 GMT		Report	Taylor 39', 80'	Stadium: Beveree Stadium; Attendance: 695

1 February 2025 5R	Spennymoor Town	2–2 (3–1 p)	Boston United	Spennymoor
15:00 GMT	Taylor 66'; Ramshaw 78'	Report	Hazel 55'; Rowe 58'	Stadium: The Brewery Field; Attendance: 1,028
	Penalties
	Taylor (penalty scored); Dolan (penalty scored); Rutledge (penalty missed); Dyson (penalty missed); Staunton (penalty scored)		Knowles (penalty missed); Weston (penalty scored); Osborne (penalty missed); Mills (penalty missed)

1 March 2025 QF	Sutton United	0–2	Spennymoor Town	Sutton, London
15:00 GMT		Report	Taylor 15', 84'	Stadium: Gander Green Lane; Attendance: 1,578

5 April 2025 SF	Rochdale	2–2 (4–5 p)	Spennymoor Town	Rochdale
15:00 BST	Rodney 48'; Barlow 54' (pen.)	Report	Shrimpton 50'; Rutledge 90+5'	Stadium: Spotland Stadium; Attendance: 5,527
	Penalties
	Beckwith (penalty scored); Barlow (penalty scored); Mitchell (penalty scored); Buyabu (penalty scored); Allarakhia (penalty missed)		Taylor (penalty scored); Dolan (penalty scored); Harris (penalty scored); Rutledge (penalty scored); Staunton (penalty scored)

== Match ==
11 May 2025
16:15 BST

Aldershot Town	3–0	Spennymoor Town
Barham 48'; Ellison 71'; Barrett 87'	Report

Wembley Stadium, London
Attendance: 38,600
Referee: Lewis Smith (Lancashire)

GK	28	(England) Marcus Dewhurst	(substituted off) 90'
CB	33	(England) Luca Woodhouse
CB	35	(England) Dan Ellison
CB	36	(England) Will Armitage
RWB	17	(England) Aaron Jones
LWB	8	(England) Tyler Frost	(substituted off) 90+3'
CM	34	(Serbia) Dejan Tetek	(substituted off) 57'
CM	6	(England) Theo Widdrington
RW	27	(England) James Henry	(substituted off) 82'
LW	10	(Republic of Ireland) Josh Barrett
CF	22	(England) Jack Barham	(substituted off) 75'
Substitutes:
GK	1	(Netherlands) Jordi van Stappershoef	(substituted on) 90'
DF	18	(England) Olly Scott	(substituted on) 90+3'
DF	24	(England) Maxwell Mullins	(substituted on) 82'
FW	9	(Spain) Kai Corbett	(substituted on) 57'
FW	14	(England) Ollie Bray
FW	23	(Lebanon) Hady Ghandour
FW	39	(Saint Kitts and Nevis) Kwame Thomas	(substituted on) 75'
Manager:
(England) Tommy Widdrington

GK	1	(England) Brad James	(substituted off) 90+3'
RB	14	(England) Olly Dyson
CB	24	(England) Michael Ledger
CB	6	(England) Ben Beals	(substituted off) 84'
LB	3	(Republic of Ireland) Reece Staunton
CM	29	(England) Matthew Dolan	(substituted off) 84'
CM	27	(England) Finley Shrimpton
RW	11	(England) Junior Mondal	(substituted off) 69'
AM	10	(England) Rob Ramshaw
LW	28	(England) Corey McKeown	(substituted off) 75'
CF	9	(England) Glen Taylor
Substitutes:
GK	13	(England) Ryan Johnson	(substituted on) 90+3'
DF	5	(England) Daniel Rowe	(substituted on) 84'
DF	15	(England) Dan Myers
DF	19	(England) Nathan Simpson
MF	4	(England) Callum Ross	(substituted on) 84'
FW	7	(England) Will Harris	(substituted on) 75'
FW	17	(England) Aidan Rutledge	(substituted on) 69'
Manager:
(England) Graeme Lee

Man of the Match:
Jack Barham (Aldershot Town)

Assistant referees:
Andrew Fox (Leicestershire and Rutland)
Sam Lewis (Bedfordshire)
Fourth official:
Elliott Bell (Liverpool)

Match rules

- 90 minutes.
- 30 minutes of extra time if necessary.
- Penalty shoot-out if scores still level.
- Seven named substitutes.
- Maximum of five substitutions.
