= 2018–19 Northern Football Alliance =

Northern Football Alliance
- Season: 2018–19

The 2018–19 Northern Football Alliance consists of 48 teams split over 3 leagues of 16 teams.

== Premier Division ==
The following 3 clubs left the Northern Alliance Premier Division before the season -

- Birtley Town - promoted to Northern League Division 2
- Ashington Colliers - resigned from the league
- Northbank Carlisle - resigned from the league

The following 5 clubs joined the Northern Alliance Premier Division before the season -

- Alnwick Town - relegated from Northern League Division Two
- AFC New Fordley - promoted from Northern Alliance Division 1
- Newcastle Blue Star - promoted from Northern Alliance Division 1
- Newcastle Chemfica - promoted from Northern Alliance Division 1
- Killingworth YPC - promoted from Northern Alliance Division 1

Other changes to Northern Alliance Premier Division before the season -

- Killingworth Town & Killingworth YPC merged / renamed AFC Killingworth
- Hazlerigg Victory renamed Newcastle Blue Star

| Pos | Team | Pld | W | D | L | GF | GA | GD | Pts | Promotion, qualification or relegation |
|---|---|---|---|---|---|---|---|---|---|---|
| 1 | Newcastle University | 17 | 16 | 0 | 1 | 92 | 12 | +80 | 48 | Promotion to Northern League Division 2 |
| 2 | AFC Killingworth | 14 | 12 | 1 | 1 | 58 | 16 | +42 | 37 | |
| 3 | Newcastle Blue Star | 15 | 12 | 1 | 2 | 46 | 17 | +29 | 37 | |
| 4 | Gateshead Rutherford | 17 | 10 | 1 | 6 | 37 | 33 | +4 | 31 | |
| 5 | Ponteland United | 19 | 9 | 3 | 7 | 40 | 32 | +8 | 30 | |
| 6 | Wallington | 17 | 9 | 2 | 6 | 34 | 31 | +3 | 29 | |
| 7 | Alnwick Town | 17 | 8 | 3 | 6 | 35 | 30 | +5 | 27 | |
| 8 | Shankhouse | 19 | 7 | 1 | 11 | 26 | 43 | −17 | 22 | |
| 9 | Percy Main Amateurs | 21 | 7 | 1 | 13 | 29 | 55 | −26 | 22 | |
| 10 | Newcastle Chemfica | 18 | 5 | 5 | 8 | 37 | 41 | −4 | 20 | |
| 11 | Seaton Delaval AFC | 16 | 6 | 1 | 9 | 26 | 43 | −17 | 19 | |
| 12 | AFC New Fordley | 15 | 5 | 2 | 8 | 29 | 44 | −15 | 17 | |
| 13 | Whitley Bay A | 17 | 5 | 3 | 9 | 34 | 57 | −23 | 15 (Note: 3 points deducted) | |
| 14 | Gateshead FC A | 17 | 4 | 2 | 11 | 38 | 46 | −8 | 14 | |
| 15 | FC United of Newcastle | 16 | 4 | 1 | 11 | 30 | 64 | −34 | 13 | |
| 16 | North Shields Athletic | 19 | 2 | 5 | 12 | 31 | 58 | −27 | 11 | Relegation to Northern Alliance Division 1 |

Updated to match(es) played on 15 January 2019. Source:
Rules for classification: 1) Points; 2) Goal difference; 3) Number of goals scored; 4) Number of matches won;

== Division 1 ==
The following 5 clubs left the Northern Alliance Division 1 before the season -

- AFC New Fordley - promoted to Northern Alliance Premier Division
- Newcastle Blue Star - promoted to Northern Alliance Premier Division
- Newcastle Chemfica - promoted to Northern Alliance Premier Division
- Killingworth YPC - promoted to Northern Alliance Premier Division
- Cramlington Town – relegated to Northern Alliance Division 2

The following 5 clubs joined the Northern Alliance Division 1 before the season -

- Blyth Spartans Reserves - promoted from Northern Alliance Division 2
- Prudhoe Youth Club - promoted from Northern Alliance Division 2
- Winlaton Vulcans - promoted from Northern Alliance Division 2
- Bedlington FC - promoted from Northern Alliance Division 2
- Blyth Town - promoted from Northern Alliance Division 2

Other changes to Northern Alliance Division 1 before the season -

- Hebburn Reyrolle renamed Hebburn Town U23s

| Pos | Team | Pld | W | D | L | GF | GA | GD | Pts | Promotion, qualification or relegation |
|---|---|---|---|---|---|---|---|---|---|---|
| 1 | Blyth Town | 15 | 14 | 1 | 0 | 42 | 6 | +36 | 43 | Promotion to Northern Alliance Premier Division |
| 2 | Cullercoats | 17 | 13 | 1 | 3 | 51 | 19 | +32 | 40 | |
| 3 | Bedlington FC | 18 | 12 | 1 | 5 | 56 | 35 | +21 | 37 | |
| 4 | Blyth Spartans Reserves | 17 | 11 | 2 | 4 | 72 | 25 | +47 | 35 | |
| 5 | Winlaton Vulcans | 16 | 11 | 0 | 5 | 43 | 29 | +14 | 33 | |
| 6 | Prudhoe Youth Club FC | 17 | 10 | 1 | 6 | 46 | 34 | +12 | 31 | |
| 7 | Hexham | 14 | 8 | 1 | 5 | 33 | 25 | +8 | 25 | |
| 8 | Hebburn Town U23 | 17 | 8 | 1 | 8 | 48 | 45 | +3 | 25 | |
| 9 | Forest Hall | 16 | 6 | 3 | 7 | 37 | 33 | +4 | 21 | |
| 10 | Seaton Burn | 18 | 5 | 4 | 9 | 30 | 35 | −5 | 19 | |
| 11 | Felling Magpies | 17 | 4 | 5 | 8 | 25 | 43 | −18 | 17 | |
| 12 | Wallsend Boys Club | 16 | 5 | 1 | 10 | 22 | 35 | −13 | 16 | |
| 13 | Red Row Welfare | 16 | 4 | 2 | 10 | 35 | 44 | −9 | 11 (Note: 3 points deducted) | |
| 14 | Longbenton FC | 20 | 4 | 2 | 14 | 34 | 76 | −42 | 11 | |
| 15 | Gosforth Bohemians | 14 | 2 | 2 | 10 | 28 | 52 | −24 | 8 | |
| 16 | Newcastle East End FC | 16 | 1 | 1 | 14 | 21 | 87 | −66 | 4 | Relegation to Northern Alliance Division 2 |

Updated to match(es) played on 15 January 2019. Source:
Rules for classification: 1) Points; 2) Goal difference; 3) Number of goals scored; 4) Number of matches won;

== Division 2 ==
The following 5 clubs left the Northern Alliance Division 2 before the season -

- Blyth Spartans Reserves - promoted to Northern Alliance Division 1
- Prudhoe Youth Club Seniors - promoted to Northern Alliance Division 1
- Winlaton Vulcans - promoted to Northern Alliance Division 1
- Bedlington FC - promoted to Northern Alliance Division 1
- Blyth Town - promoted to Northern Alliance Division 1

The following 5 clubs joined the Northern Alliance Division 2 before the season -

- Burradon FC – elected into the league
- Ellington - promoted from Tyneside Amateur League
- Jesmond - promoted from Tyneside Amateur League
- Stobswood Welfare - promoted from Tyneside Amateur League
- Rothbury - promoted from North Northumberland League

Other changes to Northern Alliance Division 2 before the season -

- Seghill FC renamed Seaton Sluice FC
- Whitburn Athletic renamed Whitburn & Cleadon

| Pos | Team | Pld | W | D | L | GF | GA | GD | Pts | Promotion, qualification or relegation |
|---|---|---|---|---|---|---|---|---|---|---|
| 1 | Whitley Bay Sporting Club | 19 | 14 | 1 | 4 | 59 | 39 | +20 | 43 | Promotion to Northern Alliance Division 1 |
| 2 | Rothbury | 16 | 12 | 3 | 1 | 46 | 21 | +25 | 39 | |
| 3 | Cramlington United | 18 | 11 | 2 | 5 | 57 | 33 | +24 | 35 | |
| 4 | Willington Quay Saints | 19 | 11 | 2 | 6 | 58 | 40 | +18 | 35 | |
| 5 | Whitburn & Cleadon | 18 | 10 | 3 | 5 | 46 | 30 | +16 | 33 | |
| 6 | Spittal Rovers | 17 | 10 | 1 | 6 | 51 | 25 | +26 | 31 | |
| 7 | Blyth FC | 14 | 9 | 1 | 4 | 40 | 21 | +19 | 28 | |
| 8 | Ellington | 15 | 8 | 3 | 4 | 40 | 23 | +17 | 27 | |
| 9 | Coundon and Leeholme | 15 | 8 | 0 | 7 | 36 | 28 | +8 | 24 | |
| 10 | Jesmond | 16 | 7 | 1 | 8 | 50 | 34 | +16 | 22 | |
| 11 | Wideopen and District | 17 | 4 | 3 | 10 | 34 | 59 | −25 | 15 | |
| 12 | Seaton Sluice FC | 19 | 5 | 0 | 14 | 39 | 74 | −35 | 15 | |
| 13 | Stobswood Welfare | 19 | 5 | 2 | 12 | 27 | 55 | −28 | 14 (Note: 3 points deducted) | |
| 14 | Cramlington Town | 20 | 4 | 2 | 14 | 27 | 78 | −51 | 14 | |
| 15 | Gateshead Redheugh 1957 | 16 | 3 | 2 | 11 | 25 | 50 | −25 | 11 | |
| 16 | Burradon | 14 | 2 | 0 | 12 | 20 | 45 | −25 | 6 | Potential relegation to National League step 10 |

Updated to match(es) played on 15 January 2019. Source:
Rules for classification: 1) Points; 2) Goal difference; 3) Number of goals scored; 4) Number of matches won;
