= 2024–25 FA Trophy =

English football tournament season

FA Trophy
Football Association Trophy
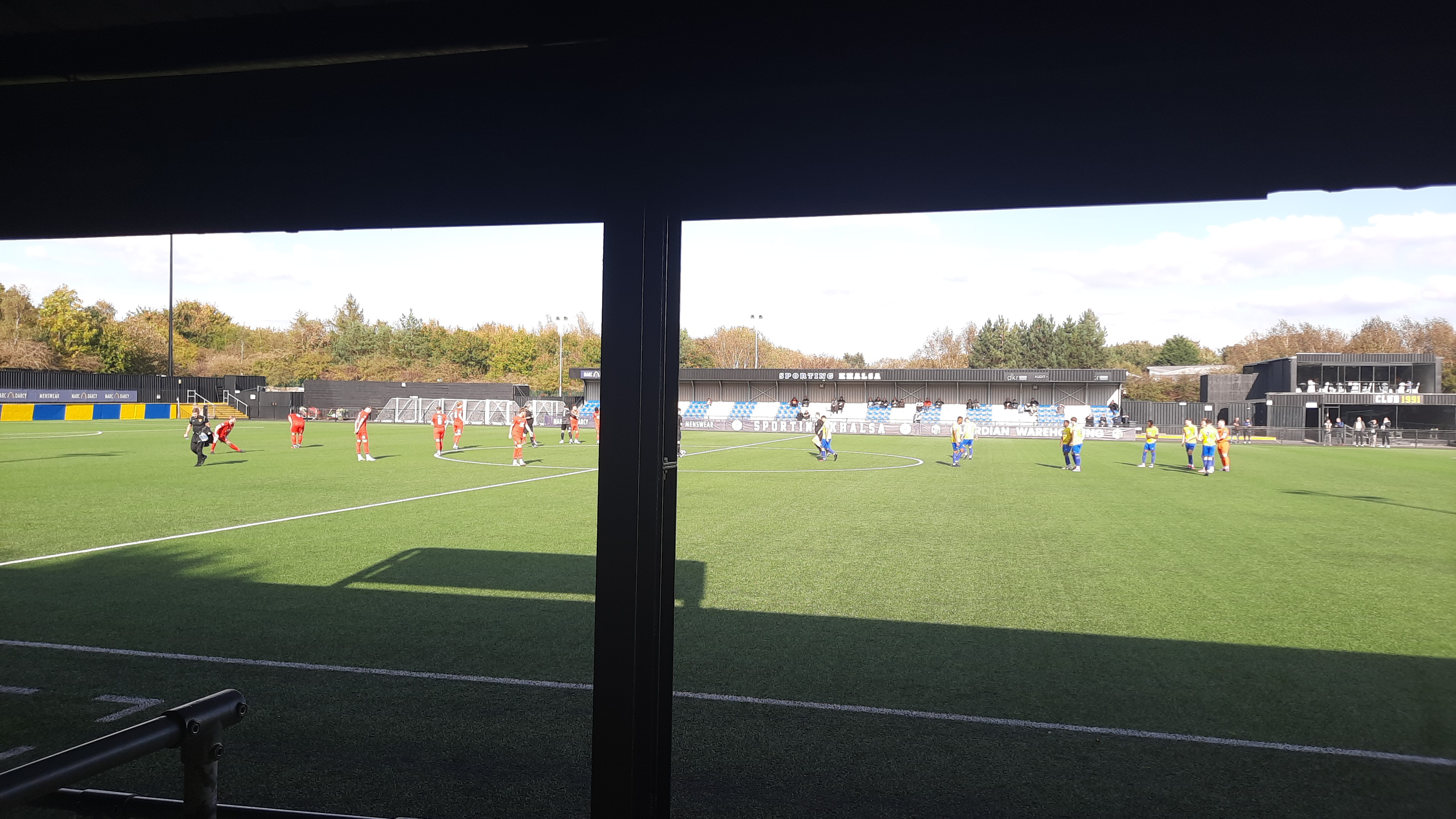
- Sporting Khalsa 5–2 Harborough Town, Third qualifying round, 5 October 2024

Tournament details
- Country: England; Wales
- Dates: Qualifying rounds: 24 August 2024 – 5 October 2024; Competition Proper: 26 October 2024 – 10–11 May 2025

Final positions
- Champions: Aldershot Town (1st title)
- Runners-up: Spennymoor Town

The 2024–25 FA Trophy (known for sponsorship reasons as the 2024–25 Isuzu FA Trophy) was the 56th edition of the FA Trophy, an annual football competition for teams at levels 5–8 of the English football league system.

Defending champions Gateshead were knocked-out during the fourth round by Boston United.

== Format and eligibility ==
The calendar was announced by The Football Association on 14 June 2024.

Gateshead were the reigning champions for the 2024–25 season, having defeated Solihull Moors in the 2024 FA Trophy final at Wembley Stadium.

Round	Main Date	Number of Fixtures	Clubs Remaining	New Entries This Round	Losing Club	Winning Club
Preliminary round	24 August 2024	14	334 → 320	28	£400	£1,500
First round qualifying	7 September 2024	80	320 → 240	146	£400	£1,500
Second round qualifying	21 September 2024	40	240 → 200	none	£575	£2,250
Third round qualifying	5 October 2024	64	200 → 136	88	£625	£2,450
First round proper	26 October 2024	32	136 → 104	none	£775	£3,000
Second round proper	16 November 2024	40	104 → 64	48	£1,000	£3,750
Third round proper	7 December 2024	32	64 → 32	24	£1,250	£4,500
Fourth round proper	4 January 2025	16	32 → 16	none	£1,500	£5,250
Fifth round proper	1 February 2024	8	16 → 8	none	£1,750	£6,000
Quarter-finals	1 March 2025	4	8 → 4	none	£2,000	£7,500
Semi-finals	5 April 2025	2	4 → 2	none	£5,000	£15,000
Final	11 May 2025	1	2 → 1	none	£30,000	£60,000

== Preliminary round ==
The draw for the preliminary round was made on 5 July 2024.

Due to the increase in the number of teams in step four, a preliminary round was used for the first time in five years.

Tie	Home team	Score	Away team	Att.
Saturday 24 August 2024
1	Congleton Town (8)	4–1	Ashington (8)	475
2	City of Liverpool (8)	3–3 (5–4 p)	Bootle (8)	309
3	Lye Town (8)	0–1	Anstey Nomads (8)	97
4	Long Eaton United (8)	Void (Note: The match had to be replayed due to Stafford Rangers using an ineligible player which led to the initial 2–1 win for Stafford Rangers to become void, causing a replay to be scheduled.)	Stafford Rangers (8)	187
5	AFC Dunstable (8)	2–0	Concord Rangers (8)	64
6	Biggleswade (8)	2–2 (5–4 p)	Hertford Town (8)	91
8	Moneyfields (8)	0–2	Hayes & Yeading United (8)	107
9	Ashford Town (Middlesex) (8)	1–1 (3–4 p)	Ascot United (8)	90

Tie	Home team	Score	Away team	Att.
10	South Park (8)	0–0 (2–4 p)	Steyning Town (8)	88
11	Lancing (8)	Void (Note: The match had to be replayed due to Southall using two ineligible players which led to the initial 1–0 win for Southall to become void, causing a replay to be scheduled.)	Southall (8)	155
12	Farnham Town (8)	3–0	Erith Town (8)	281
13	Cribbs (8)	0–1	Thatcham Town (8)	80
14	Didcot Town (8)	1–3	Helston Athletic (8)	129
Tuesday 27 August 2024
7	Littlehampton Town (8)	2–2 (5–4 p)	Rayners Lane (8)	149
Tuesday 3 September 2024
11R	Lancing (8)	0–4	Southall (8)	154
Wednesday 4 September 2024
4R	Long Eaton United (8)	2–2 (3–4 p)	Stafford Rangers (8)	187

== First round qualifying ==
The draw for the first round qualifying was also made on 5 July 2024.

The remaining 146 teams from step 4 joined the 14 winners from the preliminary round.

Tie	Home team	Score	Away team	Att.
Friday 6 September 2024
8	Emley (8)	2–0	Dunston (8)	410
60	Ascot United (8)	5–0	Merstham (8)	230
64	Kingstonian (8)	3–0	Eastbourne Town (8)	249
Saturday 7 September 2024
1	Heaton Stannington (8)	1–0	North Ferriby (8)	506
2	Congleton Town (8)	1–0	Wythenshawe (8)	626
3	Bishop Auckland (8)	1–2	Nantwich Town (8)	328
4	Stalybridge Celtic (8)	1–1 (6–7 p)	Ossett United (8)	561
5	Liversedge (8)	1–2	Avro (8)	197
6	Garforth Town (8)	0–1	Wythenshawe Town (8)	335
7	City of Liverpool (8)	2–2 (4–2 p)	Mossley (8)	221
9	Bridlington Town (8)	0–1	Trafford (8)	434
10	Runcorn Linnets (8)	1–2	Pontefract Collieries (8)	449
11	Brighouse Town (8)	1–1 (3–5 p)	Clitheroe (8)	234
12	Consett (8)	1–1 (4–5 p)	Atherton Collieries (8)	226
13	Vauxhall Motors (8)	1–1 (2–3 p)	Newton Aycliffe (8)	206
14	Stocksbridge Park Steels (8)	3–0	Widnes (8)	173
15	Witton Albion (8)	1–3	Bradford (Park Avenue) (8)	422
16	Hednesford Town (8)	4–1	Quorn (8)	1,014
17	Kidsgrove Athletic (8)	3–1	AFC Rushden & Diamonds (8)	179
18	Grantham Town (8)	0–2	Coleshill Town (8)	249
19	Sutton Coldfield Town (8)	3–1	Newcastle Town (8)	218
20	Sheffield (8)	Void (Note: The match had to be replayed due to Loughborough Students using an ineligible player which led to the initial 1–0 win for Loughborough Students to become void, causing a replay to be scheduled.)	Loughborough Students (8)	282
21	Grimsby Borough (8)	2–2 (2–3 p)	Chasetown (8)	121
22	Bedworth United (8)	1–3	Sherwood Colliery (8)	115
23	Darlaston Town (8)	0–2	Cleethorpes Town (8)	173
24	Belper Town (8)	2–1	Boldmere St. Michaels (8)	435
25	Rugby Town (8)	0–0 (4–5 p)	Carlton Town (8)	339
26	Racing Club Warwick (8)	2–3	Hanley Town (8)	264
27	Anstey Nomads (8)	6–1	Shepshed Dynamo (8)	158
28	Coventry Sphinx (8)	0–2	Sporting Khalsa (8)	105
29	Worcester City (8)	1–4	Hinckley LR (8)	551
30	Wellingborough Town (8)	2–3	Corby Town (8)	390
31	Walsall Wood (8)	2–1	Stafford Rangers (8)	187
32	Felixstowe & Walton United (8)	4–2	Basildon United (8)	337
33	Tilbury (8)	1–1 (6–5 p)	Welwyn Garden City (8)	252
34	Leighton Town (8)	0–0 (4–3 p)	Stotfold (8)	327
35	Enfield (8)	2–0	Biggleswade (8)	105
36	Heybridge Swifts (8)	0–1	Maldon & Tiptree (8)	400
37	Wroxham (8)	0–0 (4–3 p)	Aylesbury United (8)	185
38	Hadley (8)	2–1	Grays Athletic (8)	190
39	Walthamstow (8)	1–2	Real Bedford (8)	255

Tie	Home team	Score	Away team	Att.
40	Redbridge (8)	1–3	Haringey Borough (8)	132
41	Leverstock Green (8)	1–0	Bury Town (8)	114
42	Barton Rovers (8)	1–1 (4–2 p)	Waltham Abbey (8)	121
43	Mildenhall Town (8)	2–4	Brightlingsea Regent (8)	166
44	AFC Dunstable (8)	2–2 (2–3 p)	Berkhamsted (8)	181
45	Ware (8)	2–2 (4–2 p)	Newmarket Town (8)	213
46	Brentwood Town (8)	3–2	Witham Town (8)	223
48	Ipswich Wanderers (8)	2–0	Gorleston (8)	128
49	Uxbridge (8)	6–0	Phoenix Sports (8)	120
50	Hartley Wintney (8)	2–1	East Grinstead Town (8)	163
51	Sheppey United (8)	2–3	Ramsgate (8)	362
52	Raynes Park Vale (8)	4–3	Beckenham Town (8)	270
53	Badshot Lea (8)	0–4	Broadbridge Heath (8)	102
54	Horndean (8)	3–0	Binfield (8)	75
55	Deal Town (8)	0–1	Ashford United (8)	655
56	Hanworth Villa (8)	0–5	Margate (8)	147
57	Three Bridges (8)	2–1	Hythe Town (8)	144
58	Westfield (8)	4–0	Metropolitan Police (8)	136
61	Sevenoaks Town (8)	3–0	Harrow Borough (8)	134
62	Farnham Town (8)	1–2	Flackwell Heath (8)	397
63	Steyning Town (8)	0–5	Thame United (8)	108
65	Herne Bay (8)	1–0	Northwood (8)	274
66	Southall (8)	0–2	Burgess Hill Town (8)	86
67	AFC Croydon Athletic (8)	1–0	Beaconsfield Town (8)	102
68	Hayes & Yeading United (8)	0–1	Leatherhead (8)	236
69	Sittingbourne (8)	2–0	Sutton Common Rovers (8)	220
70	Willand Rovers (8)	0–2	Bishop's Cleeve (8)	153
71	Bashley (8)	Void (Note: The match had to be replayed due to an administrative error which led to the initial 1–1 (7–6 p) win for Mousehole to become void, causing a replay to be scheduled.)	Mousehole (8)	234
72	Helston Athletic (8)	1–1 (2–3 p)	Melksham Town (8)	78
73	Shaftesbury (8)	0–1	North Leigh (8)	61
74	Exmouth Town (8)	4–1	Kidlington (8)	320
75	Bemerton Heath Harlequins (8)	Void (Note: The match had to be replayed due to an administrative error which led to the initial 5–0 win for Yate Town to become void, causing a replay to be scheduled.)	Yate Town (8)	98
76	Bideford (8)	2–0	Malvern Town (8)	197
77	Falmouth Town (8)	3–0	Cinderford Town (8)	373
78	Thatcham Town (8)	Void (Note: The match had to be replayed due to an administrative error which led to the initial 4–2 win for Evesham United to become void, causing a replay to be scheduled.)	Evesham United (8)	218
79	Bristol Manor Farm (8)	2–0	Westbury United (8)	252
80	Tavistock (8)	3–2	Larkhall Athletic (8)	99
Sunday 8 September 2024
47	Cambridge City (8)	2–1	Kings Langley (8)	173
59	Littlehampton Town (8)	3–2	Sporting Bengal United (8)	165
Tuesday 17 September 2024
20R	Sheffield (8)	2–3	Loughborough Students (8)	121
71R	Bashley (8)	0–4	Mousehole (8)	118
Match played at Mousehole
78R	Thatcham Town (8)	1–2	Evesham United (8)	108
Wednesday 18 September 2024
75R	Bemerton Heath Harlequins (8)	1–3	Yate Town (8)	97

== Second round qualifying ==
The draw for the second round qualifying was made on 9 September 2024.

Tie	Home team	Score	Away team	Att.
Friday 20 September 2024
21	Real Bedford (8)	4–0	Leighton Town (8)	546
3	City of Liverpool (8)	4–0	Pontefract Collieries (8)	234
Saturday 21 September 2024
1	Trafford (8)	3–1	Atherton Collieries (8)	464
2	Ossett United (8)	2–1	Bradford (Park Avenue) (8)	259
4	Emley (8)	0–3	Newton Aycliffe (8)	242
5	Clitheroe (8)	3–1	Heaton Stannington (8)	447
6	Wythenshawe Town (8)	2–2 (3–4 p)	Stocksbridge Park Steels (8)	178
7	Avro (8)	0–1	Congleton Town (8)	180
8	Hanley Town (8)	1–0	Sherwood Colliery (8)	143
10	Hednesford Town (8)	1–2	Chasetown (8)	1,351
11	Anstey Nomads (8)	A–A	Sutton Coldfield Town (8)	85
12	Coleshill Town (8)	3–2	Carlton Town (8)	62
13	Walsall Wood (8)	1–1 (4–5 p)	Cleethorpes Town (8)	78
14	Kidsgrove Athletic (8)	1–2	Belper Town (8)	229
15	Loughborough Students (8)	1–1 (2–3 p)	Hinckley LR (8)	145
16	Maldon & Tiptree (8)	2–2 (4–2 p)	Corby Town (8)	186
17	Felixstowe & Walton United (8)	2–1	Enfield (8)	319
18	Hadley (8)	4–1	Ipswich Wanderers (8)	121
19	Leverstock Green (8)	3–4	Barton Rovers (8)	87

Tie	Home team	Score	Away team	Att.
20	Newmarket Town (8)	1–3	Cambridge City (8)	305
22	Berkhamsted (8)	4–0	Tilbury (8)	218
23	Brightlingsea Regent (8)	1–2	Brentwood Town (8)	151
24	Wroxham (8)	1–3	Haringey Borough (8)	184
25	Sittingbourne (8)	4–1	Kingstonian (8)	231
26	Ashford United (8)	2–1	Hartley Wintney (8)	308
27	Westfield (8)	1–3	Thame United (8)	97
28	Three Bridges (8)	0–3	Herne Bay (8)	229
Match played at Herne Bay
29	Uxbridge (8)	2–1	AFC Croydon Athletic (8)	134
30	Littlehampton Town (8)	0–0 (5–4 p)	Burgess Hill Town (8)	207
31	Ramsgate (8)	2–1	Raynes Park Vale (8)	626
32	Ascot United (8)	1–0	Margate (8)	152
33	Flackwell Heath (8)	6–1	Broadbridge Heath (8)	237
34	Sevenoaks Town (8)	1–2	Leatherhead (8)	137
35	Tavistock (8)	3–0	North Leigh (8)	119
36	Exmouth Town (8)	1–2	Horndean (8)	233
37	Mousehole (8)	3–1	Falmouth Town (8)	371
38	Melksham Town (8)	2–0	Bishop's Cleeve (8)	377
39	Evesham United (8)	2–2 (3–5 p)	Bristol Manor Farm (8)	246
40	Yate Town (8)	2–0	Bideford (8)	262
Tuesday 24 September 2024
9	Sporting Khalsa (8)	4–3	Nantwich Town (8)	137
11R	Anstey Nomads (8)	2–0	Sutton Coldfield Town (8)	82

== Third round qualifying ==
The draw for the third round qualifying was made on 23 September 2024.

Tie	Home team	Score	Away team	Att.
Friday 4 October 2024
3	City of Liverpool (8)	0–3	Macclesfield (7)	372
Saturday 5 October 2024
1	Workington (7)	3–1	Morpeth Town (7)	592
2	Blyth Spartans (7)	0–2	Stockton Town (7)	385
4	Whitby Town (7)	0–1	Newton Aycliffe (8)	401
5	Ossett United (8)	2–0	Prescot Cables (7)	273
6	Congleton Town (8)	1–0	Hyde United (7)	757
7	Trafford (8)	2–5	Ashton United (7)	469
8	Stocksbridge Park Steels (8)	1–1 (1–3 p)	Warrington Rylands 1906 (7)	166
9	Guiseley (7)	0–1	Bamber Bridge (7)	460
10	Hebburn Town (7)	0–3	FC United of Manchester (7)	505
11	Clitheroe (8)	2–0	Lancaster City (7)	684
12	Stourbridge (7)	3–0	Matlock Town (7)	498
13	Kettering Town (7)	0–2	Gainsborough Trinity (7)	954
14	Stamford (7)	1–5	Anstey Nomads (8)	295
15	Belper Town (8)	3–1	Hinckley LR (8)	572
16	Chasetown (8)	1–0	Bromsgrove Sporting (7)	406
17	Sporting Khalsa (8)	5–2	Harborough Town (7)	129
18	Redditch United (7)	0–3	Halesowen Town (7)	476
19	Basford United (7)	2–2 (4–1 p)	Hanley Town (8)	132
20	Barwell (7)	1–0	Stratford Town (7)	224
21	AFC Telford United (7)	1–1 (5–4 p)	Cleethorpes Town (8)	816
22	Ilkeston Town (7)	2–3	Coleshill Town (8)	317
23	Worksop Town (7)	2–1	St Ives Town (7)	377
24	Leek Town (7)	0–1	Mickleover (7)	303
25	Spalding United (7)	1–2	Alvechurch (7)	336
26	Ramsgate (8)	1–3	Cray Valley Paper Mills (7)	685
27	Bowers & Pitsea (7)	3–0	Real Bedford (8)	122
28	Sittingbourne (8)	2–1	Bognor Regis Town (7)	246
29	Potters Bar Town (7)	2–1	Whitehawk (7)	71
30	Uxbridge (8)	3–2	Thame United (8)	149
31	Ashford United (8)	1–0	Walton & Hersham (7)	304
32	Felixstowe & Walton United (8)	4–0	Haringey Borough (8)	315

Tie	Home team	Score	Away team	Att.
33	Hanwell Town (7)	1–1 (3–1 p)	Berkhamsted (8)	175
34	Sudbury (7)	0–1	Cambridge City (8)	258
35	Leatherhead (8)	1–2	Hastings United (7)	372
36	Folkestone Invicta (7)	8–1	Ascot United (8)	263
37	Lewes (7)	6–3	Bracknell Town (7)	628
38	Leiston (7)	1–1 (3–4 p)	Horsham (7)	128
39	Bedford Town (7)	1–5	Hendon (7)	351
40	Maldon & Tiptree (8)	1–2	Canvey Island (7)	203
41	Flackwell Heath (8)	1–1 (1–4 p)	Bishop's Stortford (7)	344
42	Dover Athletic (7)	3–0	Cheshunt (7)	436
43	Brentwood Town (8)	1–1 (4–3 p)	Cray Wanderers (7)	268
44	Lowestoft Town (7)	2–3	Royston Town (7)	361
45	Marlow (7)	0–1	Biggleswade Town (7)	202
46	Littlehampton Town (8)	0–1	Barton Rovers (8)	212
47	Chichester City (7)	2–0	Herne Bay (8)	279
48	Chertsey Town (7)	1–1 (6–5 p)	Billericay Town (7)	457
49	Chatham Town (7)	1–0	Wingate & Finchley (7)	537
50	Dartford (7)	0–1	Dulwich Hamlet (7)	591
51	Hashtag United (7)	1–0	Hitchin Town (7)	137
52	Hadley (8)	3–1	Carshalton Athletic (7)	163
53	Mousehole (8)	0–2	Bristol Manor Farm (8)	205
54	Gloucester City (7)	2–2 (8–7 p)	Wimborne Town (7)	427
55	Frome Town (7)	1–1 (4–5 p)	Havant & Waterlooville (7)	293
56	Taunton Town (7)	1–0	Basingstoke Town (7)	735
57	AFC Totton (7)	1–0	Merthyr Town (7)	507
58	Hungerford Town (7)	3–1	Sholing (7)	268
59	Tiverton Town (7)	0–0 (4–5 p)	Dorchester Town (7)	304
60	Plymouth Parkway (7)	3–2	Banbury United (7)	253
61	Poole Town (7)	1–1 (3–4 p)	Gosport Borough (7)	426
62	Yate Town (8)	3–0	Melksham Town (8)	527
63	Winchester City (7)	5–2	Swindon Supermarine (7)	197
64	Tavistock (8)	3–1	Horndean (8)	80

== First round proper ==
The draw for the first round proper was made on 7 October 2024.

Number of teams per tier still in competition
Tier 5	Tier 6	Tier 7	Tier 8	Total
24 / 24	48 / 48	46 / 46	18 / 18	136 / 136

Tie	Home team	Score	Away team	Att.
Saturday 26 October 2024
1	Worksop Town (7)	2–0	FC United of Manchester (7)	674
2	Warrington Rylands (7)	4–0	Ossett United (8)	311
3	Macclesfield (7)	7–1	Ashton United (7)	1,216
4	Clitheroe (7)	1–4	Gainsborough Trinity (7)	677
5	Workington (7)	2–3	Bamber Bridge (7)	605
6	Stockton Town (7)	2–1	Newton Aycliffe (8)	857
7	Mickleover (7)	1–2	AFC Telford United (7)	351
8	Basford United (7)	1–1 (5–3 p)	Anstey Nomads (8)	354
9	Barwell (7)	0–2	Sporting Khalsa (8)	230
10	Chasetown (8)	1–1 (5–4 p)	Belper Town (8)	469
11	Halesowen Town (7)	4–1	Congleton Town (8)	808
12	Stourbridge (7)	0–1	Alvechurch (7)	453
13	Gloucester City (7)	2–3	Coleshill Town (8)	479
14	Dulwich Hamlet (7)	1–1 (4–5 p)	Hashtag United (7)	1,847
15	Lewes (7)	2–2 (8–7 p)	Ashford United (8)	739

Tie	Home team	Score	Away team	Att.
16	Bishop's Stortford (7)	1–6	Felixstowe & Walton United (8)	339
17	Dover Athletic (7)	0–2	Sittingbourne (8)	658
18	Cambridge City (8)	1–2	Royston Town (7)	302
19	Uxbridge (7)	0–3	Chertsey Town (7)	334
20	Brentwood Town (8)	4–3	Cray Valley Paper Mills (7)	429
21	Biggleswade Town (7)	2–0	Potters Bar Town (7)	180
22	Barton Rovers (8)	0–3	Folkestone Invicta (7)	252
23	Bowers & Pitsea (7)	0–1	Chatham Town (7)	230
24	Hanwell Town (7)	5–0	Hendon (7)	224
25	Hadley (8)	4–3	Hastings United (7)	209
26	Canvey Island (7)	0–2	Horsham (7)	306
27	Gosport Borough (7)	5–1	Taunton Town (7)	550
28	Hungerford Town (7)	2–3	Yate Town (8)	252
29	Bristol Manor Farm (8)	1–1 (2–4 p)	Havant & Waterlooville (7)	262
30	AFC Totton (7)	1–0	Dorchester Town (7)	301
31	Tavistock (8)	0–4	Winchester City (7)	199
32	Plymouth Parkway (7)	0–4	Chichester City (7)	251

== Second round proper ==
The draw for the second round proper was made on 28 October 2024.

Number of teams per tier still in competition
Tier 5	Tier 6	Tier 7	Tier 8	Total
24 / 24	48 / 48	24 / 46	8 / 18	104 / 136

Tie	Home team	Score	Away team	Att.
Saturday 16 November 2024
1	Southport (6)	3–0	Warrington Town (6)	1,166
2	Scunthorpe United (6)	1–2	Warrington Rylands 1906 (7)	1,270
3	Gainsborough Trinity (7)	1–0	Chester (6)	753
4	Bamber Bridge (7)	0–1	Farsley Celtic (6)	520
5	Spennymoor Town (6)	2–1	South Shields (6)	1,052
6	Darlington (6)	1–0	Buxton (6)	995
7	Stockton Town (7)	3–1	Scarborough Athletic (6)	1,131
8	Curzon Ashton (6)	2–2 (3–5 p)	Macclesfield (7)	775
9	Chorley (6)	3–0	Marine (6)	980
10	Radcliffe (6)	3–2	Worksop Town (7)	624
11	Coleshill Town (8)	4–5	Biggleswade Town (7)	182
12	Alfreton Town (6)	3–2	Needham Market (6)	383
13	Aveley (6)	2–1	Hemel Hempstead Town (6)	206
15	Oxford City (6)	5–0	Sporting Khalsa (8)	309
16	Enfield Town (6)	1–1 (9–8 p)	Hornchurch (6)	502
17	Alvechurch (7)	0–0 (5–4 p)	Chasetown (8)	328
18	Leamington (6)	2–1	King's Lynn Town (6)	502
19	Hereford (6)	0–1	Brentwood Town (8)	1,442
20	Royston Town (7)	0–1	Rushall Olympic (6)	401
21	Kidderminster Harriers (6)	2–1	Halesowen Town (7)	3,884

Tie	Home team	Score	Away team	Att.
22	Boreham Wood (6)	1–1 (5–4 p)	Felixstowe & Walton United (8)	401
23	Peterborough Sports (6)	2–0	Chelmsford City (6)	387
24	Hadley (8)	1–0	AFC Telford United (7)	319
25	St Albans City (6)	1–2	Basford United (7)	980
26	Lewes (7)	0–2	AFC Totton (7)	1,259
27	Salisbury (6)	3–0	Farnborough (6)	607
28	Yate Town (8)	0–2	Hampton & Richmond Borough (6)	525
29	Folkestone Invicta (7)	0–2	Hanwell Town (7)	602
30	Horsham (7)	2–1	Maidstone United (6)	1,248
31	Gosport Borough (7)	1–0	Tonbridge Angels (6)	594
32	Welling United (6)	1–2	Havant & Waterlooville (7)	540
33	Slough Town (6)	1–1 (4–2 p)	Chatham Town (7)	547
34	Chesham United (6)	2–0	Chippenham Town (6)	490
35	Chichester City (7)	2–3	Worthing (6)	1,100
36	Winchester City (7)	1–1 (4–5 p)	Sittingbourne (8)	463
37	Torquay United (6)	1–0	Truro City (6)	1,967
38	Bath City (6)	2–3	Chertsey Town (7)	779
39	Weston-super-Mare (6)	2–3	Weymouth (6)	559
40	Dorking Wanderers (6)	1–1 (2–4 p)	Eastbourne Borough (6)	1,471
Sunday 17 November 2024
14	Hashtag United (7)	3–2	Brackley Town (6)	172

=== Upsets ===
Giantkiller (tier)	Opponent (tier)
Upset of two leagues above
Brentwood Town (level 8)	1–0 away vs Hereford (level 6)

== Third round proper ==
The draw for the third round proper was made on 18 November 2024. Three teams from the eighth tier, Brentwood Town, Hadley and Sittingbourne, are the lowest-ranked teams remaining in the competition.

Number of teams per tier still in competition
Tier 5	Tier 6	Tier 7	Tier 8	Total
24 / 24	23 / 48	14 / 46	3 / 18	64 / 136

Tie	Home team	Score	Away team	Att.
Saturday 7 December 2024
29	Brentwood Town (8)	3–5	Southend United (5)	1,323
1	Basford United (7)	2–2 (6–5 p)	FC Halifax Town (5)	476
3	AFC Fylde (5)	2–2 (0–3 p)	Kidderminster Harriers (6)	446
5	Stockton Town (7)	2–0	Oldham Athletic (5)	1,545
7	Solihull Moors (5)	1–2	Radcliffe (6)	374
8	Boston United (5)	1–0	Alvechurch (7)	836
9	Altrincham (5)	0–0 (4–2 p)	Macclesfield (7)	3,032
11	York City (5)	3–1	Darlington (6)	3,522
12	Gainsborough Trinity (7)	2–1	Rushall Olympic (6)	401
13	Chorley (6)	3–2	Warrington Rylands (7)	573
14	Alfreton Town (6)	0–1	Spennymoor Town (6)	231
16	Braintree Town (5)	1–1 (3–5 p)	Forest Green Rovers (5)	214
17	Barnet (5)	2–0	Aveley (6)	588
18	Sutton United (5)	3–3 (4–2 p)	Ebbsfleet United (5)	955
19	Boreham Wood (6)	1–0	Eastbourne Borough (6)	430
20	Aldershot Town (5)	3–1	Wealdstone (5)	1,172
21	Oxford City (6)	2–1	Hadley (8)	324
23	Sittingbourne (8)	4–2	Enfield Town (6)	362

Tie	Home team	Score	Away team	Att.
30	Slough Town (6)	2–1	Maidenhead United (5)	1,770
31	Worthing (6)	1–1 (2–3 p) (Note: Gosport Borough were removed from the FA Trophy by the FA for fielding an ineligible player in their Second Round match against Tonbridge Angels. Worthing thus advanced to the next round.)	Gosport Borough (7)	947
32	Hampton & Richmond Borough (6)	3–0	Hashtag United (7)	480
Tuesday 10 December 2024
2	Hartlepool United (5)	1–1 (0–3 p)	Tamworth (5)	1,312
4	Gateshead (5)	A–A (Note: Match abandoned during the first half, with the score at 1–0, due a serious injury to Farsley Celtic's captain, Lewis Turner.)	Farsley Celtic (6)	892
6	Southport (6)	2–1	Peterborough Sports (6)	442
10	Leamington (6)	0–2	Rochdale (5)	302
22	Woking (5)	3–3 (4–2 p)	Havant & Waterlooville (7)	423
24	Torquay United (6)	2–0	Horsham (7)	1,162
25	Yeovil Town (5)	1–2	Weymouth (6)	3,168
26	Chesham United (6)	2–3	Salisbury (6)	261
27	Biggleswade Town (7)	1–1 (3–2 p)	AFC Totton (7)	187
28	Hanwell Town (7)	1–2	Eastleigh (5)	203
Wednesday 11 December 2024
15	Chertsey Town (7)	1–0	Dagenham & Redbridge (5)	582
Tuesday 17 December 2024
4R	Gateshead (5)	8–1	Farsley Celtic (6)	351

=== Upsets ===
Giantkiller (tier)	Opponent (tier)
Upset of two leagues above
Basford United (level 7)	2(6)–2(5) at home vs FC Halifax Town (level 5)
Chertsey Town (level 7)	1–0 at home vs Dagenham & Redbridge (level 5)
Stockton Town (level 7)	2–0 at home vs Oldham Athletic (level 5)
Sittingbourne (level 8)	4–2 at home vs Enfield (level 6)

== Fourth round proper ==
The draw was conducted on 9 December 2024 and ties will be played on 4 January 2025. Sittingbourne from the eighth tier is the lowest-ranked team remaining in the competition, with six seventh tier clubs also remaining in the competition. Reigning champions Gateshead were knocked-out in this round by Boston United.

Number of teams per tier still in competition
Tier 5	Tier 6	Tier 7	Tier 8	Total
13 / 24	13 / 48	5 / 46	1 / 18	32 / 136

Tie	Home team	Score	Away team	Att.
Saturday 4 January 2025
1	Aldershot Town (5)	8–0	Chertsey Town (7)	1,721
2	Kidderminster Harriers (6)	4–0	Slough Town (6)	1,854
4	Altrincham (5)	3–1	Barnet (5)	1,233
5	Worthing (6)	5–1	Torquay United (6)	1,228
7	Sittingbourne (8)	2–1	Salisbury (6)	706
8	Forest Green Rovers (5)	2–0	Chorley (6)	692
11	Gainsborough Trinity (7)	1–0	York City (5)	1,726
12	Basford United (7)	1–4	Eastleigh (5)	361
13	Weymouth (6)	1–2	Boreham Wood (6)	624
14	Gateshead (5)	1–3 (Note: Match took place at Stockton Town's MAP Group UK Stadium due to expected low temperatures affecting Gateshead's pitch.)	Boston United (5)	368

Tie	Home team	Score	Away team	Att.
15	Hampton & Richmond Borough (6)	0–2	Spennymoor Town (6)	695
16	Southend United (5)	1–0	Southport (6)	3,113
Tuesday 7 January 2025
6	Biggleswade Town (7)	0–3	Oxford City (6)	120
9	Woking (5)	4–0	Radcliffe (6)	781
10	Sutton United (5)	1–0	Tamworth (5)	951
Wednesday 8 January 2025
3	Rochdale (5)	0–0 (4–3 p) (Note: Match was originally due to take place at Rochdale, but was postponed due to a frozen pitch. The match was re-scheduled to take place at Stockton's ground.)	Stockton Town (7)	1,158

=== Upsets ===
Giantkiller (tier)	Opponent (tier)
Upset of two leagues above
Gainsborough Trinity (level 7)	1-0 at home vs York City (level 5)
Sittingbourne (level 8)	2-1 at home vs Salisbury (level 6)

== Fifth round proper ==
Sittingbourne from the eighth tier is the lowest-ranked team remaining in the competition, with Gainsborough Trinity being the last seventh tier club remaining in the competition.

Number of teams per tier still in competition
Tier 5	Tier 6	Tier 7	Tier 8	Total
9 / 24	5 / 48	1 / 46	1 / 18	16 / 136

Tie	Home team	Score	Away team	Att.
Saturday 1 February 2025
1	Gainsborough Trinity (7)	0–3	Woking (5)	1,007
2	Southend United (5)	0–1	Sittingbourne (8)	4,810
3	Spennymoor Town (6)	2–2 (3–1 p)	Boston United (5)	1,028
4	Oxford City (6)	1–0	Forest Green Rovers (5)	661
5	Aldershot Town (5)	2–0	Boreham Wood (6)	1,647
6	Kidderminster Harriers (6)	0–1	Sutton United (5)	2,065
7	Worthing (6)	1–2	Rochdale (5)	2,230
8	Altrincham (5)	1–0	Eastleigh (5)	1,464

== Quarter-finals ==
Sittingbourne from the eighth tier is the lowest-ranked team remaining in the competition. The draw took place on 3 February 2025 alongside the 2024–25 FA Vase quarter-finals draw.

Number of teams per tier still in competition
Tier 5	Tier 6	Tier 7	Tier 8	Total
5 / 24	2 / 48	0 / 46	1 / 18	8 / 136

Tie	Home team	Score	Away team	Att.
Saturday 1 March 2025
1	Oxford City (6)	2–2 (1–2 p)	Woking (5)	1,538
2	Sutton United (5)	0–2	Spennymoor Town (6)	1,578
3	Sittingbourne (8)	0–3	Aldershot Town (5)	1,300
4	Rochdale (5)	2–0	Altrincham (5)	3,029

== Semi-finals ==
Spennymoor Town from the National League North is the lowest-ranked team remaining in the competition, while the only remaining former finalist is Woking. The draw took place on 3 March 2025.

Number of teams per tier still in competition
Tier 5	Tier 6	Tier 7	Tier 8	Total
3 / 24	1 / 48	0 / 46	0 / 18	4 / 136

5 April 2025
12:30 GMT

Aldershot Town (5)	2–1	Woking (5)
Henry 75' (pen.); Barham 90+3'	Report	Walker 55'

The EBB Stadium, Aldershot
Attendance: 7,058

5 April 2025

Rochdale (5)	2–2 (a.e.t.)	Spennymoor Town (6)
Rodney 48'; Barlow 54' (pen.)	Report	Shrimpton 50'; Rutledge 90+5'
Penalties
Beckwith (penalty scored); Barlow (penalty scored); Mitchell (penalty scored); Buyabu (penalty scored); Allarakhia (penalty missed)	4–5	(penalty scored) Taylor; (penalty scored) Dolan; (penalty scored) Harris; (penalty scored) Rutledge; (penalty scored) Staunton

Crown Oil Arena, Rochdale
Attendance: 5,527
Referee: Declan Bourne

== Final ==
Spennymoor Town from the National League North is the lowest-ranked team remaining in the competition. Aldershot town visited Wembley for the first time in their history, 99 years after the original Aldershot fc played at the stadium. The shots sold around 18,000 tickets because of them being very close to London. Spennymoor bought fewer people because they are situated up north.

Number of teams per tier still in competition
Tier 5	Tier 6	Tier 7	Tier 8	Total
1 / 24	1 / 48	0 / 46	0 / 18	2 / 136

11 May 2025
16:15 BST

Aldershot Town	3–0	Spennymoor Town
Barham 48'; Ellison 71'; Barrett 87'	Report

Wembley Stadium, London
Attendance: 38,600
Referee: Lewis Smith (Lancashire)
