= 2025 FA Vase final =

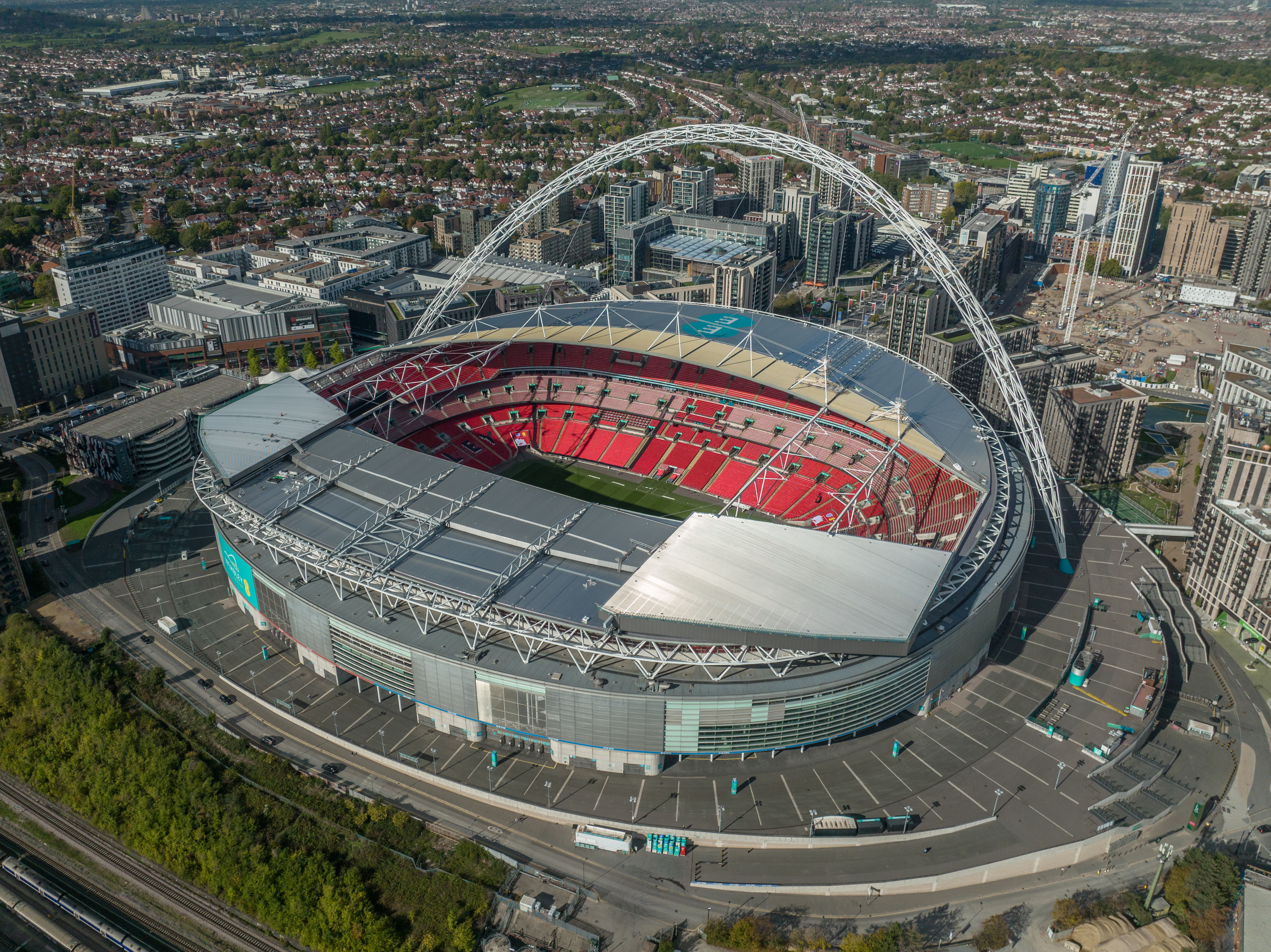
- Wembley Stadium hosted the final
- Event: 2024–25 FA Vase
AFC Whyteleafe	Whitstable Town
1	2
- After extra time
- Date: 11 May 2025
- Venue: Wembley Stadium, London
- Man of the Match: Harvey Smith (Whitstable Town)
- Referee: Ruebyn Ricardo (Leicestershire and Rutland)
- Attendance: 38,600

The 2025 FA Vase final was the 51st final of the Football Association's cup competition for teams at levels 9–11 of the English football league system. The match was contested between AFC Whyteleafe of the Combined Counties Football League and Whitstable Town of the Southern Counties East Football League. Both clubs were appearing in their first final.

As part of Non-League Finals Day, the FA Trophy final was played on the same day at the same venue. The match was televised on TNT Sports 4 and available for streaming on Discovery+.

== Route to the final ==
=== AFC Whyteleafe ===
21 September 2024 Second Qualifying Round	AFC Whyteleafe	1–0	Soul Tower Hamlets	Whyteleafe
15:00 BST	Ward 73'			Stadium: Church Road; Attendance: 152

19 October 2024 First Round	AFC Whyteleafe	4–0	Saltdean United	Whyteleafe
15:00 BST	Watson 22'; Mico 68'; Delgado-Hibbert 84'; Negassi 90+1'			Stadium: Church Road; Attendance: 209

9 November 2024 Second Round	AFC Whyteleafe	3–1	Harefield United	Whyteleafe
15:00 GMT	Mico 72'; Watson 76' (pen.); Johnson-Palmer 82'		Farhall 6'	Stadium: Church Road; Attendance: 169

7 December 2024 Third Round	AFC Whyteleafe	3–1	Tadley Calleva	Whyteleafe
15:00 GMT	Mico 45'; Watson 83' (pen.); Gondoh 90+3'		Rodgers 8'	Stadium: Church Road; Attendance: 154

11 January 2025 Fourth Round	AFC Whyteleafe	5–0	Dereham Town	Whyteleafe
15:00 GMT	Mascoll 5', 23'; Bennett 66'; Melanson 72' (o.g.); Watson 79'			Stadium: Church Road; Attendance: 458

1 February 2025 Fifth Round	AFC Whyteleafe	1–0	Egham Town	Whyteleafe
15:00 GMT	Watson 49'			Stadium: Church Road; Attendance: 773

1 March 2025 Quarter-Final	AFC Whyteleafe	1–0	Bourne Town	Whyteleafe
15:00 GMT	Mico 8'			Stadium: Church Road; Attendance: 1,540

29 March 2025 Semi-Final First Leg	AFC Whyteleafe	3–1	Andover New Street	Whyteleafe
15:00 GMT	Bennett 22', 90+10'; Mico 26'		Postance 66'	Stadium: Church Road; Attendance: 2,000

5 April 2025 Semi-Final Second Leg	Andover New Street	0–1 (1–4 agg.)	AFC Whyteleafe	Charlton, Hampshire
15:00 BST			Bennett 5'	Stadium: Foxcotte Park; Attendance: 1,350

=== Whitstable Town ===
24 August 2024 First Qualifying Round	Corinthian-Casuals	1–4	Whitstable Town	Tolworth
15:00 BST	Murad 21'	Report	Oliver 55'; Smith 80', 88', 93'	Stadium: King George's Field; Attendance: 143

21 September 2024 Second Qualifying Round	Whitstable Town	1–0	Hollands & Blair	Whitstable
15:00 BST	West 45'	Report		Stadium: The Belmont Ground; Attendance: 267

19 October 2024 First Round	Whitstable Town	1–0	Virginia Water	Whitstable
15:00 BST	Oliver 9'	Report		Stadium: The Belmont Ground; Attendance: 365

9 November 2024 Second Round	Whitstable Town	2–1	Lydd Town	Whitstable
15:00 GMT	H. Smith 58'; R. Smith 90+5' (o.g.)	Report	Astle 68'	Stadium: The Belmont Ground; Attendance: 401

14 December 2024 Third Round	Whitstable Town	2–1	Jersey Bulls	Whitstable
12:30 GMT	Oliver 84' (pen.); Grierson 86'	Report	Lekimamati 13'	Stadium: The Belmont Ground; Attendance: 367

18 January 2025 Fourth Round	Walsham-le-Willows	1–1 (2–3 p)	Whitstable Town	Walsham le Willows
15:00 GMT	Garcia 87'	Report	Sithole 48'	Stadium: Summer Road; Attendance: 267

1 February 2025 Fifth Round	Whitstable Town	2–1	Fleet Town	Whitstable
15:00 GMT	Boulton 48'; Dalton 56'	Report	Stepney 73'	Stadium: The Belmont Ground; Attendance: 1,121

1 March 2025 Quarter-Final	Whitstable Town	3–2	Whitchurch Alport	Whitstable
15:00 GMT	Sithole 20'; Jeche 72'; Smith 90+1'	Report	Knowles 9'; Bower 18'	Stadium: The Belmont Ground; Attendance: 2,656

29 March 2025 Semi-Final First Leg	Whitstable Town	2–0	Hartpury University	Whitstable
15:00 GMT	Jeche 11'; O'Mara 69'	Report		Stadium: The Belmont Ground; Attendance: 2,905

6 April 2025 Semi-Final Second Leg	Hartpury University	0–0 (0–2 agg.)	Whitstable Town	Hartpury
15:00 BST		Report		Stadium: Harpury University Stadium; Attendance: 905

== Match ==
=== Details ===
11 May 2025
12:15 BST

AFC Whyteleafe	1–2 (a.e.t.)	Whitstable Town
Bennett 17'	Report	Smith 52'; Sithole 100'

Wembley Stadium, London
Attendance: 38,600
Referee: Ruebyn Ricardo (Leicestershire and Rutland)

Man of the Match:
Harvey Smith (Whitstable Town)

Assistant referees:
Emily Carney (Lancashire)
David Harrison (Essex)
Fourth official:
Zac Kennard-Kettle (Northumberland)

Match rules

- 90 minutes.
- 30 minutes of extra time if necessary.
- Penalty shoot-out if scores still level.
- Seven named substitutes.
- Maximum of five substitutions.
