= 2017–18 Northern Football Alliance =

Northern Football Alliance
- Season: 2017–18

The 2017–18 Northern Football Alliance consists of 47 teams split over 3 leagues.

== Premier Division ==
Pos	Team	Pld	W	D	L	GF	GA	GD	Pts	Promotion, qualification or relegation
1	Newcastle University (C)	30	25	2	3	123	31	+92	77	Champions Not Promoted
2	Birtley Town (P)	30	22	3	5	91	42	+49	69	Promotion to the 2018–19 Northern Football League Division Two
3	Ponteland United	30	17	6	7	68	49	+19	57	
4	Whitley Bay	30	17	3	10	86	63	+23	54	
5	Seaton Delaval AFC	30	18	2	10	100	63	+37	56	
6	Wallington	29	16	5	8	85	54	+31	53	
7	Killingworth Town	30	13	5	12	59	54	+5	44	
8	Shankhouse	30	13	5	12	52	48	+4	44	
9	Ashington Colliers	30	14	4	12	68	61	+7	46	Resigned from the league
10	Gateshead Rutherford	30	11	5	14	52	62	−10	38	
11	Percy Main Amateurs	30	12	2	16	58	72	−14	38	
12	AFC Newbiggin	30	11	2	17	56	88	−32	35	
13	Gateshead FC A	30	8	3	19	67	72	−5	27	
14	Northbank Carlisle	29	8	4	17	57	71	−14	28	Resigned from the league
15	North Shields Athletic	30	7	1	22	49	106	−57	22	
16	FC United of Newcastle	30	0	2	28	25	160	−135	2	

Updated to match(es) played on 4 July 2018. Source: https://fulltime.thefa.com/ff/DivisionDetails?divisionid=8912591&leagueid=6866065&seasonid=674920247]
Rules for classification: 1) Points; 2) Goal difference; 3) Number of goals scored; 4) Number of matches won; 5) Head-to-head results
(C) Champions; (P) Promoted

== Division 1 ==
Pos	Team	Pld	W	D	L	GF	GA	GD	Pts	Promotion or relegation
1	Killingworth YPC	30	27	2	1	144	29	+115	83	Promotion to Premier Division
2	Hazlerigg Victory	30	24	2	4	131	32	+99	74	Promotion to Premier Division
3	Newcastle Chemfica	30	18	6	6	115	50	+65	60	Promotion to Premier Division
4	Felling Magpies	30	16	3	11	88	67	+21	51	
5	Wallsend Community	30	15	6	9	89	66	+23	51	
6	Seaton Burn	30	14	5	11	73	65	+8	47	
7	Forest Hall	30	14	3	13	61	58	+3	45	
8	New Fordley	30	16	2	12	75	52	+23	50	Resigned from the league
9	Hexham	30	14	2	14	77	65	+12	44	
10	Red Row Welfare	30	13	3	14	74	77	−3	42	
11	Wallsend Boys Club	30	11	5	14	66	62	+4	38	
12	Gosforth Bohemians	30	10	4	16	46	70	−24	34	
13	Hebburn Reyrolle	30	8	3	19	53	121	−68	27	
14	Cullercoats	30	8	4	18	49	79	−30	28	
15	Newcastle East End	30	3	3	24	34	152	−118	12	
16	Cramlington Town	30	2	1	27	30	160	−130	7	Relegation to Division Two

Updated to match(es) played on 4 July 2018. Source: https://fulltime.thefa.com/ff/DivisionDetails?divisionid=7785448&leagueid=6866065&seasonid=674920247]
Rules for classification: 1) Points; 2) Goal difference; 3) Number of goals scored; 4) Number of matches won; 5) Head-to-head results

== Division 2 ==
Pos	Team	Pld	W	D	L	GF	GA	GD	Pts	Promotion or relegation
1	Blyth Spartans Reserves	28	23	4	1	126	33	+93	73	Promotion to Division One
2	Prudhoe Youth Club Seniors	28	20	1	7	96	45	+51	61	Promotion to Division One
3	Winlaton Vulcans	28	16	6	6	93	50	+43	54	Promotion to Division One
4	Bedlington FC	28	16	4	8	91	55	+36	52	Promotion to Division One
5	Blyth Town	28	15	7	6	83	51	+32	52	Promotion to Division One
6	Cramlington United	28	14	6	8	79	70	+9	48	
7	Blyth FC	28	14	1	13	58	63	−5	43	
8	Whitburn Athletic	28	11	4	13	51	57	−6	37	
9	Whitley Bay Sporting Club	28	10	6	12	62	68	−6	36	
10	Coundon and Leeholme	28	9	7	12	54	63	−9	34	
11	Wideopen and District	28	7	4	17	42	70	−28	25	
12	Spittal Rovers	28	6	7	15	43	82	−39	25	
13	Willington Quay Saints	28	6	3	19	44	84	−40	21	
14	Seghill FC	28	4	7	17	37	70	−33	19	
15	Gateshead Redheugh 1957	28	4	3	21	39	137	−98	15	

Updated to match(es) played on 4 July 2018. Source: https://fulltime.thefa.com/ff/DivisionDetails?divisionid=863439&leagueid=6866065&seasonid=674920247]
Rules for classification: 1) Points; 2) Goal difference; 3) Number of goals scored; 4) Number of matches won; 5) Head-to-head results
