= 2024–25 FA Vase =

English football tournament season

Football Association Vase
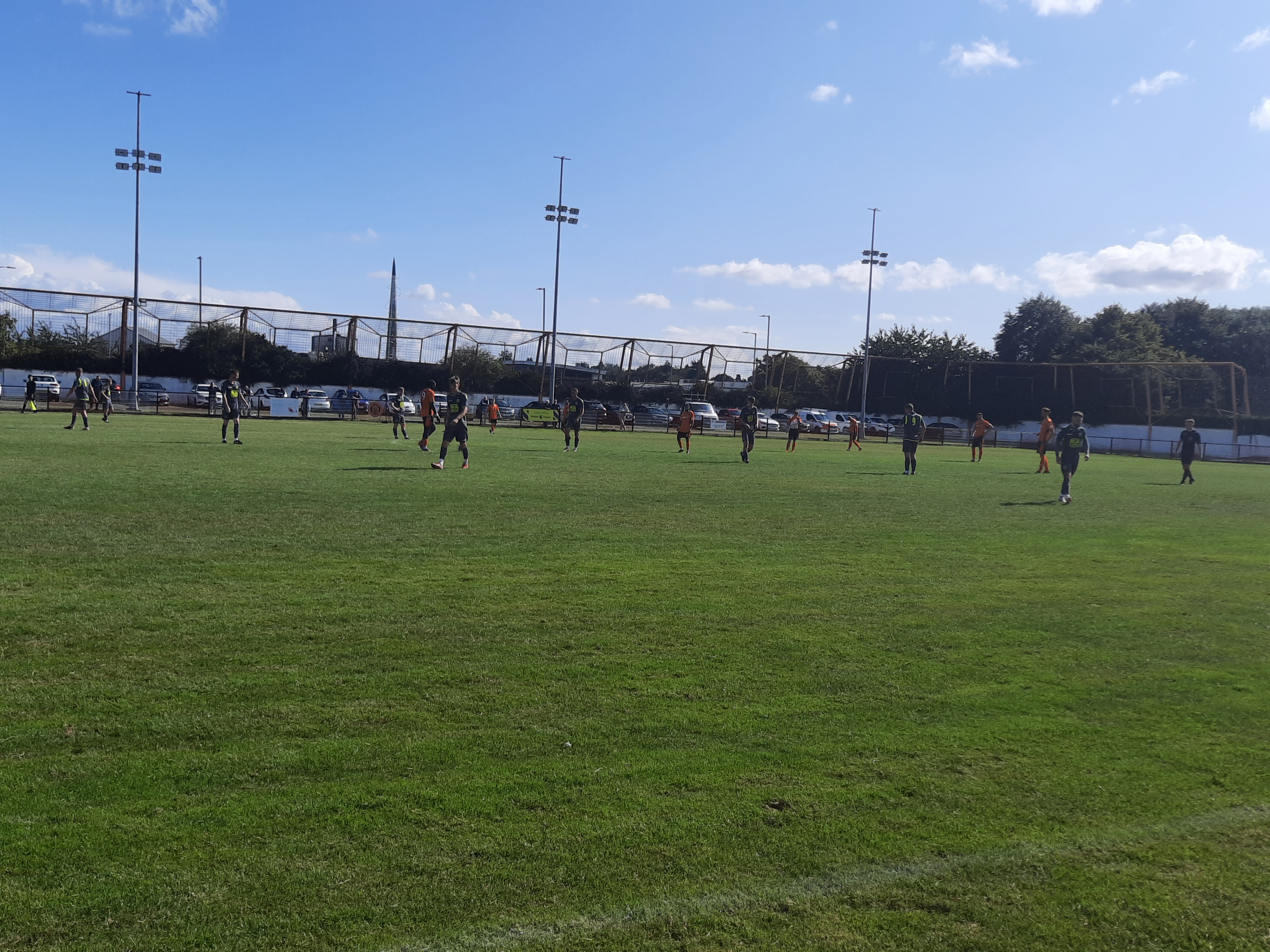
- Bilston Town 1–4 Stafford Town, First qualifying round, 24 August 2024

Tournament details
- Country: England; Wales; Jersey
- Dates: Qualifying: 24 August 2024 – 21 September 2024; Competition Proper: 19 October 2023 – 10/11 May 2024
- Teams: Total: 596

Final positions
- Champions: Whitstable Town (1st title)
- Runners-up: AFC Whyteleafe

The 2024–25 FA Vase (known for sponsorship reasons as the Isuzu FA Vase) is the 51st season of the FA Vase, an annual football competition for teams playing in steps 5 & 6 of the English National League System. The competition was played on a regional basis until the 4th round.

The Vase was won by Whitstable Town FC, beating AFC Whyteleafe 2-1 in the final, after extra time.

The defending champions were Romford. They lost 3–2 against Takeley in the second round.

== Calendar ==
Round	Main date	Number of fixtures	Clubs remaining	New entries this round	Prize money winners	Prize money losers
First round qualifying	24 August 2024	187	596 → 409	374	£550	£160
Second round qualifying	21 September 2024	177	409 → 232	167	£725	£225
First round proper	19 October 2024	103	231 → 128	29	£825	£250
Second round proper	9 November 2024	64	128 → 64	25	£900	£275
Third round proper	7 December 2024	32	64 → 32	None	£1,125	£350
Fourth round proper	11 January 2025	16	32 → 16	None	£1,875	£600
Fifth round proper	1 February 2025	8	16 → 8	None	£2,250	£725
Quarter-finals	1 March 2025	4	8 → 4	None	£4,125	1,350
Semi-finals	29 March 2025 & 5 April 2025	2	4 → 2	None	£5,500	£1,725
Final	11 May 2025	1	2 → 1	None	£30,000	£15,000

== First qualifying round ==
The draw for the first qualifying round was made on 5 July 2024.

Tie	Home team	Score	Away team	Att.
Friday 23 August 2024
12	Chester-le-Street Town (10)	0–1	Billingham Town (10)	200
176	Newton Abbot Spurs (10)	0–2	Ivybridge Town (9)	153
11	Pickering Town (9)	2–3	Newcastle Benfield (9)	116
20	Wombwell Town (10)	4–0	Nostell Miners Welfare (10)	144
30	Euxton Villa (10)	2–1	Squires Gate (9)	226
73	Great Yarmouth Town (9)	3–0	Soham Town Rangers (9)	272
90	St. Margaretsbury (10)	1–3	Haverhill Borough (10)	75
104	Wellingborough Whitworth (10)	1–3	Milton Keynes Irish (9)	142
121	Reading City (9)	3–2	Abingdon United (10)	127
134	Montpelier Villa (10)	0–3	Haywards Heath Town (9)	85
135	Meridian VP (10)	2–2 (5–4 p)	Lewisham Borough (10)	80
168	Totton & Eling (10)	1–2	Verwood Town (10)	73
171	Fawley (10)	1–2	Christchurch (9)	112
39	AFC Liverpool (9)	3–1	Northwich Victoria (9)	125
112	Sandhurst Town (9)	4–1	Nailsea & Tickenham (9)	79
Saturday 24 August 2024
179	Sidmouth Town (10)	3–1	Torrington (10)	90
1	Longridge Town (9)	2–3	Whitley Bay (9)	106
2	Newcastle Blue Star (9)	0–1	Easington Colliery (9)	332
3	Sunderland RCA (10)	0–4	FC Hartlepool (10)	80
4	Ilkley Town (10)	1–2	Penrith (9)	75
5	Tow Law Town (9)	2–5	Kendal Town (9)	102
6	Thackley (9)	1–3	Colne (9)	153
7	Shildon (9)	2–0	Yarm & Eaglescliffe (10)	208
8	Alnwick Town (10)	1–1 (2–3 p)	Billingham Synthonia (10)	150
9	Birtley Town (9)	0–2	Horden Community Welfare (10)	212
10	Jarrow (10)	3–2	Sunderland West End (10)	71
13	Thornaby (10)	1–2	Padiham (9)	93
14	Northallerton Town (9)	1–2	Route One Rovers (10)	126
Route One Rovers were disqualified for playing two ineligible players.
15	Boldon Community Association (10)	2–3	Seaham Red Star (9)	95
16	Redcar Town (10)	0–4	North Shields (9)	110
17	Parkgate (9)	0–2 (a.e.t.)	Sandbach United (10)	102
18	Horbury Town (10)	4–5 (a.e.t.)	Ashton Town (10)	125
19	Runcorn Town (10)	1–3	Handsworth (9)	93
21	Athersley Recreation (10)	0–2	Retford United (10)	114
22	Dearne & District (10)	0–1	Darwen (10)	181
23	FC St Helens (9)	2–1	Cheadle Heath Nomads (10)	86
24	Winsford United (10)	4–0	Litherland REMYCA (9)	241
25	Eccleshill United (9)	3–7	Chadderton (9)	46
26	Wakefield (10)	2–0	1874 Northwich (9)	336
27	Golcar United (9)	2–2 (5–6 p)	New Mills (10)	138
28	Burscough (9)	2–1	Droylsden (10)	150
29	Ashton Athletic (10)	2–1	Stockport Georgians (10)	60
31	Bottesford Town (9)	1–5	Barnton (10)	90
32	Maghull (10)	1–3	Bury (9)	1,505
Match was played at Bury.
35	Rossington Main (9)	1–3	Retford (10)	161
36	Dronfield Town (10)	1–3	Beverley Town (9)	119
37	Glasshoughton Welfare (10)	1–3	Cheadle Town (9)	95
38	Brigg Town (10)	1–1 (2–3 p)	Winterton Rangers (9)	268
40	Cammell Laird 1907 (10)	1–4	Armthorpe Welfare (10)	117
41	Barton Town (9)	1–2	Stockport Town (9)	185
42	Chelmsley Town (10)	2–3	Allscott Heath (10)	62
43	Stapenhill (10)	2–1	Pershore Town (9)	83
44	Southam United (10)	0–3 (a.e.t.)	Wolverhampton Casuals (9)	54
45	Bilston Town (10)	1–4	Stafford Town (10)	183
46	Shifnal Town (9)	3–0	Cradley Town (10)	150
47	Market Drayton Town (10)	1–0	Studley (9)	104
48	Wednesfield (10)	2–9	Atherstone Town (9)	58
49	Droitwich Spa (10)	6–2	Nuneaton Griff (10)	223
50	Alsager Town (10)	2–2 (1–3 p)	Heather St John's (10)	62
51	Worcester Raiders (9)	1–0	Eccleshall (10)	55
52	Westfields (9)	0–4	AFC Wulfrunians (9)	105
53	Brocton (9)	2–0	OJM Black Country (9)	134
54	Rugby Borough (9)	4–1	Gresley Rovers (9)	91
55	Bewdley Town (10)	4–0	AFC Bridgnorth (10)	79
56	Allexton & New Parks (10)	1–3	Clipstone (10)	32
57	Bourne Town (9)	3–2	Harrowby United (9)	219
58	Birstall United (10)	1–1 (2–3 p)	Dunkirk (10)	48
59	Clifton All Whites (10)	1–1 (1–4 p)	Deeping Rangers (9)	36
60	Blackstones (10)	3–2	Saffron Dynamo (10)	83
61	Newark Town (9)	4–3	AFC Mansfield (9)	166
62	Lutterworth Town (9)	6–1	Pinchbeck United (10)	34
63	GNG Oadby Town (9)	1–2	Radford (10)	22
64	Sandiacre Town (10)	0–5	Newark & Sherwood United (9)	67
65	Leicester Nirvana (9)	0–2	Aylestone Park (9)	37
66	Gedling Miners Welfare (10)	0–2	Sleaford Town (9)	74
67	Louth Town (10)	0–2	Heanor Town (9)	81
68	Holwell Sports (10)	0–3	Kimberley Miners Welfare (9)	55
69	Ingles (10)	0–4	Melton Town (9)	80
70	Clay Cross Town (10)	7–1	Selston (10)	112
71	Harleston Town (9)	4–3 (a.e.t.)	Wisbech Town (9)	126
72	March Town United (9)	5–2	Dussindale Rovers (10)	109
74	St Neots Town (9)	5–0	Sheringham (9)	191
75	Dereham Town (9)	4–1	FC Peterborough (10)	118
76	Mulbarton Wanderers (9)	8–0	Godmanchester Rovers (9)	72
77	Stowmarket Town (9)	2–1	Huntingdon Town (10)	101
78	Framlingham Town (10)	3–0	Ely City (9)	73
79	Eynesbury Rovers (9)	2–0	Lakenheath (9)	75
80	Diss Town (10)	1–2	Heacham (9)	88
81	Haverhill Rovers (10)	2–0	Baldock Town (9)	61
82	Long Melford (9)	0–2	Hullbridge Sports (9)	47
83	Brimsdown (10)	1–1 (3–1 p)	Hackney Wick (10)	9
84	Newbury Forest (10)	2–1	Cannons Wood (10)	45
85	Takeley (9)	3–0	Hutton (10)	65
86	Coggeshall Town (10)	3–1	May & Baker (10)	64
87	Harlow Town (10)	2–0	Ilford (9)	224
88	Colney Heath (9)	4–0	Wivenhoe Town (10)	61

Tie	Home team	Score	Away team	Att.
89	Buckhurst Hill (9)	3–1	Cockfosters (9)	55
91	Hadleigh United (9)	0–0 (4–3 p)	Woodford Town (9)	39
92	Basildon Town (10)	2–4	Rayleigh Town (10)	113
93	Potton United (9)	2–2 (3–2 p)	Little Oakley (9)	84
94	Barking (9)	4–0	FC Baresi (10)	73
95	West Essex (9)	3–1	Southend Manor (10)	64
96	Halstead Town (9)	3–3 (6–5 p)	Langford (10)	118
97	Risborough Rangers (9)	1–0	Ardley United (9)	114
98	Bedfont Sports (9)	5–0	Langley (10)	91
99	Holyport (9)	5–0	Hillingdon Borough (10)	78
100	Rising Ballers Kensington (10)	0–0 (3–4 p)	Bugbrooke St Michaels (9)	28
101	Desborough Town (10)	3–2	Aylesbury Vale Dynamos (9)	94
102	Raunds Town (10)	2–4	Penn & Tylers Green (10)	30
103	Holmer Green (10)	2–3	Rothwell Corinthians (10)	63
105	Kempston Rovers (9)	3–2	Spartans Youth (10)	113
106	Oxhey Jets (10)	1–1 (2–3 p)	Ampthill Town (10)	63
107	London Colney (10)	0–1	Winslow United (9)	20
108	Amersham Town (9)	1–2	Staines & Lammas (Middlesex) (10)	86
109	Northampton Sileby Rangers (9)	1–1 (2–4 p)	Northampton ON Chenecks (9)	121
111	Clanfield 85 (10)	1–4	Tadley Calleva (9)	64
113	Milton United (9)	2–1	Woodley United (10)	55
114	Stonehouse Town (10)	0–0 (3–1 p)	Corsham Town (9)	115
115	Brimscombe & Thrupp (9)	1–2	Roman Glass St George (9)	71
116	Oldland Abbotonians (9)	1–0	Cirencester Town (9)	97
117	Malmesbury Victoria (9)	3–0	Longlevens (9)	47
118	Hallen (10)	2–3 (a.e.t.)	Portishead Town (9)	92
120	Tytherington Rocks (10)	5–1	Keynsham Town (10)	71
122	Hengrove Athletic (10)	1–1 (4–3 p)	Shirehampton (10)	52
123	Wantage Town (10)	2–4	Bitton (10)	71
125	Newent Town (10)	1–3	Cadbury Heath (10)	124
126	Odd Down (10)	0–2	Brislington (9)	66
127	Westside (10)	1–4	VCD Athletic (9)	19
128	Redhill (9)	2–3	Billingshurst (10)	145
130	Mile Oak (10)	2–4	Glebe (9)	40
131	Ash United (10)	2–3	Crawley Down Gatwick (9)	38
132	FC Elmstead (10)	0–3	Frimley Green (10)	24
133	Abbey Rangers (9)	2–3	Rochester United (10)	39
136	Balham (9)	1–1 (4–2 p)	Punjab United (9)	35
138	Peacehaven & Telscombe (9)	1–0	Snodland Town (9)	76
139	Sporting Club Thamesmead (10)	1–1 (3–4 p)	Little Common (9)	35
140	Rusthall (9)	2–3	Soul Tower Hamlets (10)	95
141	Midhurst & Easebourne (9)	3–3 (4–5 p)	Sutton Athletic (9)	55
142	Hollands & Blair (9)	3–0	AFC Varndeanians (9)	54
143	Banstead Athletic (10)	2–4	Lordswood (9)	30
144	Fisher (9)	0–1	Faversham Town (9)	173
145	Corinthian (9)	1–1 (4–5 p)	Tooting & Mitcham United (9)	65
146	Oakwood (10)	2–2 (4–5 p)	Alfold (10)	35
148	Faversham Strike Force (10)	4–3	AFC Uckfield Town (10)	112
149	Godalming Town (10)	6–0	Erith & Belvedere (9)	85
150	Corinthian-Casuals (9)	1–4	Whitstable Town (9)	143
151	Chipstead (9)	3–1	Chessington & Hook United (10)	72
152	Forest Row (10)	3–5	Staplehurst Monarchs (10)	66
153	Kennington (9)	2–0	Loxwood (9)	96
154	Horsham YMCA (9)	1–3	East Preston (10)	66
155	Hassocks (9)	6–0	Storrington (10)	72
156	Bearsted (9)	5–2	Bexhill United (9)	76
157	Crowborough Athletic (9)	1–3	Wick (9)	141
158	Bridon Ropes (10)	0–3	Lydd Town (9)	37
159	Guildford City (9)	3–1	Worthing United (10)	68
160	Bournemouth (9)	0–5	Cowes Sports (9)	58
161	Andover New Street (9)	6–1	Lymington Town (10)	103
162	Ringwood Town (10)	2–2 (8–9 p)	Petersfield Town (9)	64
163	Folland Sports (10)	2–3	Sturminster Newton United (10)	54
164	Whitchurch United (10)	1–0	Portland United (9)	60
165	Hythe & Dibden (9)	2–6	Brockenhurst (9)	104
166	Sherborne Town (9)	1–1 (4–2 p)	Alresford Town (10)	120
167	Hamworthy United (10)	3–1	Warminster Town (10)	104
169	Baffins Milton Rovers (9)	6–2	AFC Portchester (9)	250
170	Clanfield (10)	0–6	Laverstock & Ford (9)	56
172	Millbrook (Hampshire) (9)	4–0	New Milton Town (10)	46
173	Blackfield & Langley (9)	1–0	United Services Portsmouth (9)	63
174	Fleetlands (10)	4–1	Romsey Town (10)	51
175	Callington Town (10)	1–1 (4–3 p)	Shepton Mallet (9)	126
177	St Blazey (9)	3–1	Saltash United (9)	121
178	Wendron United (10)	5–0	Dobwalls (10)	80
180	Bovey Tracey (10)	2–1	Liskeard Athletic (10)	127
181	Camelford (10)	0–1	Bishops Lydeard (10)	44
182	Torridgeside (10)	2–1	Newquay (10)	83
183	Middlezoy Rovers (10)	1–2	Okehampton Argyle (10)	124
184	Launceston (10)	2–3	Millbrook (Cornwall) (10)	92
185	Street (9)	2–3	Elburton Villa (10)	109
186	Crediton United (10)	1–3	Buckland Athletic (9)	93
187	Wadebridge Town (10)	5–1	Cheddar (10)	102
Sunday 25 August 2024
33	Worsbrough Bridge Athletic (10)	3–2	Prestwich Heys (9)	180
34	Selby Town (10)	1–0	Skelmersdale United (10)	280
110	NW London (10)	0–2	Wembley (9)	51
119	Berks County (9)	6–1	Calne Town (10)	101
124	Wokingham Town (9)	3–3 (3–4 p)	Cheltenham Saracens (10)	141
137	Sheppey Sports (10)	4–0	Reigate Priory (10)	94
147	Tooting Bec (10)	W/O	Newhaven (9)	NA
Tuesday 27 August 2024
129	Selsey (10)	1–1 (5–4 p)	Larkfield & New Hythe Wanderers (9)	149

== Second qualifying round ==
The draw for the second qualifying round was also made on 5 July 2024.

Tie	Home team	Score	Away team	Att.
Friday 20 September 2024
9	Albion Sports (9)	1–1 (5–4 p)	Tadcaster Albion (9)	69
24	Chadderton (9)	8–4	Retford United (10)	171
40	Romulus (9)	3–0	Wolverhampton Casuals (9)	76
43	Dudley Town (9)	4–0	Stone Old Alleynians (9)	142
51	Uttoxeter Town (9)	2–3	Hereford Pegasus (9)	70
81	Enfield Borough (10)	2–3	Frenford (9)	60
127	Thornbury Town (9)	2–0	Malmesbury Victoria (9)	202
154	Greenways (10)	1–3	Colliers Wood United (10)	95
124	Milton United (9)	4–1	Hengrove Athletic (10)	118
Saturday 21 September 2024
159	Blackfield & Langley (9)	2–3	East Cowes Victoria Athletic (10)	48
90	Barking (9)	0–3	Takeley (9)	78
1	North Shields (9)	3–0	Billingham Town (10)	224
2	Crook Town (10)	0–0 (4–2 p)	Holker Old Boys (10)	239
3	Guisborough Town (9)	2–1	Shildon (9)	170
4	Prudhoe Youth Club (10)	6–1	West Allotment Celtic (9)	91
5	Horden Community Welfare (10)	1–0	Kendal Town (9)	173
6	Ryton & Crawcrook Albion (10)	5–2	Garstang (10)	125
7	Easington Colliery (10)	1–3	Boro Rangers (9)	89
8	Campion (9)	2–0	Billingham Synthonia (10)	70
10	Esh Winning (10)	0–1	Marske United (9)	131
11	Barnoldswick Town (9)	3–1	Steeton (10)	162
12	Harrogate Railway Athletic (10)	2–2 (4–3 p)	Whitley Bay (9)	180
13	Jarrow (10)	2–2 (3–2 p)	Seaham Red Star (9)	116
14	Northallerton Town (9)	W/O	Bedlington Terriers (10)	
15	Yorkshire Amateur (10)	3–1	Newcastle Benfield (9)	102
16	Redcar Athletic (9)	1–1 (5–4 p)	West Auckland Town (9)	211
17	Colne (9)	2–1	Knaresborough Town (9)	107
18	Chester-le-Street (10)	0–3	FC Hartlepool (10)	85
19	Penrith (9)	1–2	Padiham (9)	116
20	Bury (9)	3–0	Burscough (9)	1,476
21	Selby Town (10)	1–3	AFC Liverpool (9)	322
22	Stockport Town (9)	2–1	FC St Helens (9)	105
23	Daisy Hill (10)	1–0	Lower Breck (9)	63
25	Beverley Town (9)	5–0	Winterton Rangers (9)	235
26	Ashton Town (10)	1–0	Armthorpe Welfare (10)	138
27	Maine Road (10)	1–3	Winsford United (10)	67
28	Pilkington (9)	2–3	Staveley Miners Welfare (10)	66
29	Retford (10)	0–1	Glossop North End (9)	136
30	Abbey Hey (9)	4–2	Penistone Church (9)	114
31	Frickley Athletic (9)	2–2 (4–5 p)	Sandbach United (10)	135
32	Wakefield (10)	2–1	Barnton (10)	177
Match played at Barnton
33	Euxton Villa (10)	2–0	Bacup Borough (10)	121
34	Goole (9)	1–3	New Mills (10)	131
35	Atherton Laburnum Rovers (10)	3–1	Cheadle Town (9)	64
36	Darwen (10)	3–1	Maltby Main (10)	126
38	Wombwell Town (10)	3–0	Ashton Athletic (10)	134
39	Abbey Hulton United (10)	1–1 (6–5 p)	Worcester Raiders (9)	89
41	Shawbury United (10)	0–1	Market Drayton Town (10)	128
42	Coton Green (10)	4–4 (3–4 p)	Foley Meir (10)	60
44	Atherstone Town (9)	1–1 (3–1 p)	Shifnal Town (9)	143
45	Sutton United (Birmingham) (10)	1–1 (5–3 p)	Stafford Town (10)	98
47	Heather St John's (10)	2–0	Sporting Club Inkberrow (10)	84
48	Brocton (9)	1–4	Allscott Heath (10)	138
49	Paget Rangers (10)	1–4	Rugby Borough (9)	34
50	Coventry Copsewood (10)	1–1 (2–3 p)	Stapenhill (10)	41
52	AFC Wulfrunians (9)	5–4	Coventry United (9)	61
53	Bewdley Town (10)	3–6	Droitwich Spa (10)	143
54	Kimberley Miners Welfare (9)	0–3	Skegness Town (9)	102
55	Sleaford Town (9)	0–3	Kirby Muxloe (9)	117
56	Aylestone Park (9)	6–6 (3–4 p)	Clay Cross Town (10)	103
57	Newark Town (9)	4–3	Southwell City (10)	236
58	Belper United (9)	2–0	Deeping Rangers (9)	44
59	Blackstones (10)	2–4	Bourne Town (9)	294
60	Coalville Town (10)	A–A	Lutterworth Town (9)	215
61	Radford (10)	2–4	Newark & Sherwood United (9)	70
62	Heanor Town (9)	4–0	Dunkirk (10)	127
63	Lutterworth Athletic (10)	1–6	Hucknall Town (9)	81
64	Pinxton (10)	3–2	Leicester St Andrews (10)	87
65	Shirebrook Town (10)	1–1 (1–4 p)	Holbeach United (10)	72
66	Melton Town (9)	2–1	Clipstone (10)	88
67	Thetford Town (9)	3–1	Swaffham Town (10)	90
68	Great Yarmouth Town (9)	3–0	Eynesbury Rovers (9)	263
69	Harleston Town (9)	3–0	Heacham (9)	107
70	Stowmarket Town (9)	1–4	Histon (9)	206
71	Yaxley (9)	4–3	Kirkley & Pakefield (9)	57
72	March Town United (9)	3–0	Mulbarton Wanderers (9)	157
73	St Neots Town (9)	0–1	Downham Town (9)	227
74	Framlingham Town (10)	0–4	Dereham Town (9)	75
75	Woodbridge Town (9)	5–1	Whittlesey Athletic (10)	116
76	FC Romania (9)	1–2	Cornard United (9)	25
77	Brantham Athletic (9)	4–1	Sawbridgeworth Town (9)	34
78	Letchworth Garden City Eagles (10)	5–0	FC Clacton (9)	103
79	Benfleet (9)	3–1	Baldock Town (9)	148
80	Potton United (9)	4–1	Hullbridge Sports (9)	105
82	Hadleigh United (9)	3–1	Harlow Town (10)	121
83	Halstead Town (9)	4–3	Haverhill Borough (10)	206
84	Stansted (9)	2–0	Burnham Ramblers (10)	82
85	Brimsdown (10)	1–0	Wormley Rovers (9)	45
86	Shefford Town & Campton (9)	1–2	West Essex (9)	77
87	Clapton Community (10)	2–2 (5–4 p)	Hoddesdon Town (10)	577

Tie	Home team	Score	Away team	Att.
88	Harwich & Parkeston (10)	4–4 (6–7 p)	Rayleigh Town (10)	176
89	Colney Heath (9)	0–0 (4–3 p)	Stanway Rovers (9)	95
91	AFC Welwyn (10)	0–1	Arlesey Town (9)	98
92	Coggeshall Town (10)	5–2	Barkingside (10)	71
93	Buckhurst Hill (9)	0–2	Newbury Forest (10)	79
94	Cranfield United (10)	2–2 (5–3 p)	Staines & Lammas (10)	150
95	Dunstable Town (9)	2–5	Tring Athletic (9)	146
96	Broadfields United (9)	1–1 (2–4 p)	Rothwell Corinthians (10)	62
97	London Samurai Rovers (10)	1–1 (2–4 p)	Spelthorne Sports (9)	74
98	Kempston Rovers (9)	1–0	Desborough Town (10)	88
99	Chalfont St Peter (10)	0–4	Harpenden Town (9)	93
100	Bedfont Sports (9)	3–0	Bedfont (10)	116
101	Irchester United (10)	1–2	Milton Keynes Irish (9)	96
102	Windsor & Eton (10)	3–0	Easington Sports (9)	238
103	Buckingham (10)	0–3	Brook House (10)	87
104	Daventry Town (9)	7–0	Rushden & Higham United (10)	110
105	Long Buckby (10)	4–2	Risborough Rangers (9)	53
106	Ampthill Town (10)	1–3	British Airways (9)	111
107	Wembley (9)	3–0	FC Deportivo Galicia (10)	62
108	Virginia Water (9)	1–0	Winslow United (9)	72
109	Edgware & Kingsbury (9)	1–2	Newport Pagnell Town (9)	66
110	Penn & Tylers Green (10)	4–1	Moulton (10)	27
111	Crawley Green (9)	1–4	Holyport (9)	30
112	Bugbrooke St Michaels (9)	0–1	Northampton ON Chenecks (9)	89
113	Cheltenham Saracens (10)	0–5	Roman Glass St George (9)	39
114	Bristol Telephones (10)	1–5	Tadley Calleva (9)	20
115	Tytherington Rocks (10)	0–2	Chipping Sodbury Town (10)	83
116	Lydney Town (9)	2–2 (4–3 p)	Oldland Abbotonians (9)	97
117	Fairford Town (9)	4–1	Reading City (9)	75
118	Mangotsfield United (9)	2–2 (3–4 p)	Stonehouse Town (10)	87
119	Eversley & California (10)	0–2	Yateley United (10)	43
120	Wallingford & Crowmarsh (9)	2–0	Sandhurst Town (9)	66
121	Bitton (10)	3–1	Tuffley Rovers (9)	58
122	AFC Aldermaston (10)	1–3	Bradford Town (10)	62
123	Longwell Green Sports (10)	0–3	Portishead Town (9)	84
126	Shortwood United (10)	2–3	Cadbury Heath (10)	73
128	Devizes Town (10)	2–1	Slimbridge (9)	89
129	Horley Town (9)	1–2	Hassocks (9)	65
130	Chipstead (9)	0–3	VCD Athletic (9)	75
131	Camberley Town (9)	3–1	Horsham YMCA (9)	36
132	Meridian VP (10)	0–2	Haywards Heath Town (9)	59
133	Molesey (10)	1–1 (2–4 p)	Crawley Down Gatwick (9)	32
134	Wick (9)	5–1	Alfold (10)	58
135	Tunbridge Wells (9)	2–0	Glebe (9)	149
136	Sheerwater (9)	0–6	Faversham Town (9)	74
137	Faversham Strike Force (10)	3–0	Selsey (10)	110
138	Billingshurst (10)	2–0	Knaphill (9)	105
140	Guildford City (9)	1–0	Tooting & Mitcham United (9)	78
141	Rochester United (10)	4–0	Welling Town (10)	77
142	Newhaven (9)	2–2 (2–4 p)	Lydd Town (9)	142
143	Canterbury City (10)	0–0 (1–3 p)	Lordswood (9)	60
144	Balham (9)	0–3	Arundel (10)	62
145	AFC Whyteleafe (9)	1–0	Soul Tower Hamlets (10)	152
146	Bearsted (9)	1–1 (5–4 p)	Kennington (9)	66
147	Copthorne (10)	1–4	Sutton Athletic (9)	49
148	Erith & Belvedere (9)	1–0	Frimley Green (10)	78
149	Staplehurst Monarchs (10)	0–1	Pagham (9)	86
150	Saltdean United (9)	3–1	Shoreham (9)	102
151	Little Common (9)	0–1	Peacehaven & Telscombe (9)	83
152	Whitstable Town (9)	1–0	Hollands & Blair (9)	267
153	Epsom & Ewell (9)	3–2	Seaford Town (10)	78
155	Newport (IOW) (10)	0–1	Verwood Town (10)	156
156	Fareham Town (9)	4–0	Cowes Sports (9)	216
157	Baffins Milton Rovers (9)	2–2 (3–4 p)	Andover New Street (9)	104
158	Bridport (10)	3–1	Brockenhurst (9)	179
160	Christchurch (9)	0–2	AFC Stoneham (9)	68
161	Millbrook (Hampshire) (9)	3–0	Alton (9)	46
162	Fleet Town (9)	6–2	Hamworthy United (10)	167
163	Whitchurch United (10)	0–4	Sherborne Town (9)	55
164	Sturminster Newton United (10)	5–0	Infinity (10)	102
166	Fleetlands (10)	3–1	Laverstock & Ford (9)	76
167	Wadebridge Town (10)	0–1	Bodmin Town (10)	112
168	Wendron United (10)	4–4 (4–2 p)	St Blazey (9)	66
169	Welton Rovers (9)	2–6	Ivybridge Town (9)	85
170	Buckland Athletic (9)	2–2 (3–1 p)	Callington Town (10)	159
171	Okehampton Argyle (10)	4–0	Millbrook (Cornwall) (10)	781
172	Elburton Villa (10)	W–O	Axminster Town (10)	NA
Walkover for Elburtan Villa due to Axminster Town withdrawing from the competition.
173	Paulton Rovers (9)	3–0	Torridgeside (10)	101
174	Bishops Lydeard (10)	2–3	Radstock Town (10)	45
175	Ilfracombe Town (9)	2–2 (5–4 p)	Bovey Tracey (10)	63
176	Honiton Town (10)	0–2	Torpoint Athletic (9)	104
177	Wellington (9)	1–3	Sidmouth Town (10)	101
Sunday 22 September 2024
125	Berks County (9)	3–0	Brislington (9)	62
46	FC Stratford (9)	2–1	Hinckley (9)	71
37	Worsbrough Bridge Athletic (10)	0–2	Handsworth (9)	131
139	Sheppey Sports (10)	1–1 (2–4 p)	Stansfeld (9)	74
Tuesday 24 September 2024
60	Coalville Town (10)	4–0	Lutterworth Town (9)	194
165	Petersfield Town (9)	7–0	Wincanton Town (9)	92

== First round proper ==
The draw for the first round proper was made on 23 September 2024. The round saw the 29 eligible teams that lost in the previous season's third round, enter the competition.

Tie	Home team	Score	Away team	Att.
Friday 18 October 2024
5	Prudhoe Youth Club (10)	2–5	Redcar Athletic (9)	280
9	Daisy Hill (10)	3–4	Ashton Town (10)	167
82	Faversham Strike Force (10)	1–2	Haywards Heath Town (9)	278
Saturday 19 October 2024
1	Wombwell Town (10)	3–2	Handsworth (9)	154
2	West Didsbury & Chorlton (9)	2–0	Stockport Town (9)	938
3	Guisborough Town (9)	0–1	Carlisle City (9)	219
4	Crook Town (10)	5–2	Newcastle University (10)	250
6	Ramsbottom United (9)	2–0	Euxton Villa (10)	191
7	Yorkshire Amateur (10)	0–2	New Mills (10)	77
8	Atherton Laburnum Rovers (10)	2–1	Colne (9)	170
10	Padiham (9)	5–0	Horden Community Welfare (10)	201
11	Ashville (10)	2–1	Marske United (9)	131
12	Northallerton Town (9)	2–0	Campion (9)	202
13	Glossop North End (9)	1–2	Sandbach United (10)	280
14	Chadderton (9)	1–1 (4–3 p)	Bury (9)	1,483
Match was played at Bury.
15	Darwen (10)	3–0	Harrogate Railway Athletic (10)	111
16	Beverley Town (9)	1–3	Abbey Hey (9)	346
17	Ryton & Crawcrook Albion (10)	3–0	Barnoldswick Town (9)	130
18	Staveley Miners Welfare (10)	1–1 (4–2 p)	Irlam (9)	170
19	Albion Sports (9)	3–3 (5–3 p)	Boro Rangers (9)	78
20	Jarrow (10)	0–1	FC Hartlepool (10)	176
21	Winsford United (10)	4–0	AFC Liverpool (9)	476
23	Rothwell Corinthians (10)	2–5	Abbey Hulton United (10)	135
24	Belper United (9)	1–2	Newark Town (9)	88
25	AFC Wulfrunians (9)	1–3	Sutton United (Birmingham) (10)	142
26	Holbeach United (10)	0–3	Droitwich Spa (10)	196
27	Hucknall Town (9)	1–1 (3–5 p)	Heanor Town (9)	240
28	Newark & Sherwood United (9)	2–2 (4–5 p)	Clay Cross Town (10)	86
29	Newport Pagnell Town (9)	0–0 (6–5 p)	Milton Keynes Irish (9)	620
30	Kirby Muxloe (10)	3–1	FC Stratford (10)	87
31	Foley Meir (10)	2–4	Yaxley (9)	79
32	Skegness Town (9)	4–0	Allscott Heath (10)	78
33	Highgate United (9)	1–2	Daventry Town (9)	125
34	Tividale (9)	3–2	Cranfield United (10)	131
35	Coalville Town (10)	3–1	Romulus (9)	213
36	Long Buckby (10)	1–4	Bourne Town (9)	64
37	Northampton ON Chenecks (9)	2–1	Heather St John's (10)	30
39	Rugby Borough (9)	4–0	Dudley Town (9)	87
40	Pinxton (10)	1–2	Melton Town (9)	141
41	Market Drayton Town (10)	4–0	Hereford Pegasus (9)	198
42	Stapenhill (10)	0–2	Eastwood Community (9)	106
43	Hadleigh United (9)	0–2	London Lions (9)	45
44	Stansted (9)	1–2	Clapton Community (10)	158
45	Colney Heath (9)	0–0 (3–4 p)	Potton United (9)	97
46	Woodbridge Town (9)	2–2 (5–6 p)	Takeley (9)	100
47	Halstead Town (9)	0–3	Harleston Town (9)	197
48	Thetford Town (9)	6–1	Cornard United (9)	90
49	Great Yarmouth Town (9)	2–0	Histon (9)	266
50	Downham Town (9)	0–2	Brantham Athletic (9)	104
51	Coggeshall Town (10)	2–4	March Town United (9)	138
52	Letchworth Garden City Eagles (10)	0–1	Biggleswade United (9)	230
53	Harpenden Town (9)	2–1	Fakenham Town (9)	194

Tie	Home team	Score	Away team	Att.
54	Brimsdown (10)	0–2	West Essex (9)	45
55	Arlesey Town (9)	0–1	Rayleigh Town (10)	142
56	Frenford (9)	0–3	Dereham Town (9)	81
58	Saffron Walden Town (9)	0–3	Tring Athletic (9)	297
59	Benfleet (9)	1–1 (7–6 p)	Newbury Forest (10)	167
60	Faversham Town (9)	1–0	British Airways (9)	265
61	Camberley Town (9)	0–2	Hassocks (9)	66
62	Yateley United (10)	2–4	Bearsted (9)	208
63	Stansfeld (9)	1–1 (1–4 p)	Peacehaven & Telscombe (9)	69
65	Guildford City (9)	0–0 (3–4 p)	Arundel (10)	107
67	Lordswood (9)	4–4 (3–4 p)	Rochester United (10)	149
68	Egham Town (9)	4–1	Colliers Wood United (10)	103
69	Athletic Newham (9)	2–3	Lydd Town (9)	53
71	Windsor & Eton (10)	3–1	Brook House (10)	324
73	Wick (9)	0–3	Harefield United (9)	98
74	AFC Whyteleafe (9)	4–0	Saltdean United (9)	209
75	Spelthorne Sports (9)	1–1 (3–4 p)	Holyport (9)	114
76	Erith & Belvedere (9)	1–1 (2–0 p)	Wallingford & Crowmarsh (9)	95
77	VCD Athletic (9)	1–1 (5–3 p)	Roffey (9)	88
78	Whitstable Town (9)	1–0	Virginia Water (9)	365
79	Sutton Athletic (9)	1–1 (3–5 p)	Fleet Town (9)	60
80	Penn & Tylers Green (10)	0–2	Bedfont Sports (9)	147
81	Wembley (9)	0–2	Crawley Down Gatwick (9)	71
83	Torpoint Athletic (9)	0–1	Thornbury Town (9)	121
84	Paulton Rovers (9)	5–0	Radstock Town (10)	386
85	AFC St Austell (9)	3–1	Cadbury Heath (10)	194
87	AFC Stoneham (9)	3–0	Royal Wootton Bassett Town (9)	114
88	Elburton Villa (10)	2–1	Petersfield Town (9)	59
89	Sturminster Newton United (10)	0–1	Okehampton Argyle (10)	163
90	Verwood Town (10)	0–5	Sherborne Town (9)	74
91	Milton United (9)	3–0	Chipping Sodbury Town (10)	48
92	Buckland Athletic (9)	1–0	Millbrook (Hampshire)	220
93	Devizes Town (10)	1–1 (4–5 p)	Wells City (10)	159
95	Bridport (10)	0–2	Hamble Club (9)	238
96	Fairford Town (9)	0–2	East Cowes Victoria Athletic (10)	103
97	Sidmouth Town (10)	1–3	Barnstaple Town (9)	159
98	Downton (9)	1–1 (4–2 p)	Stonehouse Town (10)	128
99	Bradford Town (10)	1–2	Andover New Street (9)	254
100	Bodmin Town (10)	3–2	Lydney Town (9)	128
101	Clevedon Town (9)	5–1	Wendron United (10)	121
103	Ilfracombe Town (9)	0–4	Roman Glass St George (9)	102
Sunday 20 October 2024
70	Burnham (9)	0–0 (5–3 p)	Eastbourne United (9)	53
66	Epsom & Ewell (9)	3–1	Berks County (9)	145
Tuesday 22 October 2024
72	Tunbridge Wells (9)	3–1	Pagham (9)	102
Saturday 26 October 2024
22	Wakefield (10)	0–1	North Shields (9)	346
38	Boston Town (9)	1–3	Atherstone Town (9)	130
57	Kempston Rovers (9)	1–2	White Ensign (9)	60
86	Tadley Calleva (9)	3–1	Ivybridge Town (9)	106
94	Portishead Town (9)	3–0	Fleetlands (10)	100
102	Fareham Town (9)	3–0	Bitton (10)	268
Tuesday 29 October 2024
64	Lingfield (9)	0–1	Billingshurst (10)	100

== Second round proper ==
The draw for the second round proper was made on 21 October 2024.

Tie	Home team	Score	Away team	Att.
Saturday 9 November 2024
41	Tunbridge Wells (9)	1–1 (3–0 p)	Hassocks (9)	234
42	Bedfont Sports Club (9)	0–2	Jersey Bulls (9)	91
1	Northallerton Town (9)	1–2	Crook Town (9)	330
2	Hallam (9)	1–0	New Mills (10)	705
3	Ryton & Crawcrook Albion (10)	0–2	West Didsbury & Chorlton (9)	329
4	Abbey Hey (9)	1–4	Atherton Laburnum Rovers (10)	182
5	Winsford United (10)	6–1	Darwen (10)	303
6	Ashton Town (10)	1–0	FC Hartlepool (10)	185
7	Silsden (9)	2–0	Ramsbottom United (9)	252
8	North Shields (9)	3–2	Charnock Richard (9)	412
9	Ashville (10)	1–2	Wombwell Town (10)	170
10	Whickham (9)	0–1	Redcar Athletic (9)	153
11	Carlisle City (9)	2–0	Blyth Town (9)	165
12	Albion Sports (9)	5–5 (5–3 p)	Padiham (9)	124
13	South Liverpool (9)	2–0	Chadderton (9)	103
14	Tividale (9)	0–2	Sutton United (Birmingham) (10)	147
15	Stourport Swifts (9)	3–4	Clay Cross Town (10)	117
16	Atherstone Town (9)	0–2	Abbey Hulton United (10)	287
17	Northampton ON Chenecks (9)	2–0	Kirby Muxloe (10)	83
18	Market Drayton Town (10)	1–3	Bourne Town (9)	328
19	Yaxley (9)	0–1	Melton Town (9)	158
20	Sandbach United (10)	2–3	Heanor Town (9)	180
21	Eastwood Community (9)	2–2 (2–3 p)	Lincoln United (9)	212
22	Daventry Town (9)	1–0	Staveley Miners Welfare (10)	203
23	Ashby Ivanhoe (9)	1–3	Droitwich Spa (10)	173
24	Newark Town (9)	1–1 (4–3 p)	Lichfield City (9)	329
25	Rugby Borough (9)	3–2	Skegness Town (9)	118
26	Whitchurch Alport (9)	2–2 (4–2 p)	Coalville Town (10)	188
27	Walsham-le-Willows (9)	3–0	Potton United (9)	87
28	Newport Pagnell Town (9)	1–2	Dereham Town (9)	360
29	Clapton Community (10)	0–0 (7–8 p)	Thetford Town (9)	803
30	Biggleswade United (9)	2–3	March Town United (9)	168

Tie	Home team	Score	Away team	Att.
32	Great Wakering Rovers (9)	2–2 (2–4 p)	Great Yarmouth Town (9)	238
33	London Lions (9)	10–2	Stanway Pegasus (10)	51
34	Tring Athletic (9)	4–1	Harleston Town (9)	294
35	Brantham Athletic (9)	2–1	Benfleet (9)	94
36	Rayleigh Town (10)	2–4	Harpenden Town (9)	121
37	Takeley (9)	3–2	Romford (9)	223
38	Rochester United (10)	0–1	Fleet Town (9)	236
39	Windsor & Eton (10)	5–0	Hilltop (9)	264
40	Epsom & Ewell (9)	2–0	North Greenford United (9)	107
43	Egham Town (9)	2–1	Haywards Heath Town (9)	129
44	Faversham Town (9)	4–1	Billingshurst (10)	301
45	Whitstable Town (9)	2–1	Lydd Town (9)	401
46	Peacehaven & Telscombe (9)	0–8	Crawley Down Gatwick (9)	125
47	Bearsted (9)	0–0 (2–4 p)	Erith & Belvedere (9)	106
48	VCD Athletic (9)	2–0	Arundel (10)	155
49	Spelthorne Sports (9)	1–1 (4–3 p)	Holmesdale (9)	86
50	Burnham (9)	1–0	Cobham (9)	51
51	AFC Whyteleafe (9)	3–1	Harefield United (9)	169
52	Hamble Club (9)	0–2	AFC Stoneham (9)	124
53	Highworth Town (9)	2–0	Sherborne Town (9)	127
54	Andover New Street (9)	2–2 (5–4 p)	AFC St Austell (9)	312
55	Downton (9)	1–1 (5–3 p)	Milton United (9)	86
56	Fareham Town (9)	0–0 (2–0 p)	Barnstaple Town (9)	261
57	Buckland Athletic (9)	0–3	Clevedon Town (9)	163
58	Thornbury Town (9)	0–2	Okehampton Argyle (10)	131
Match was played at Okehampton Argyle.
59	Roman Glass St George (9)	3–0	Hamworthy Recreation (9)	78
60	Portishead Town (9)	4–2	Paulton Rovers (9)	123
Match was played at Bristol Manor Farm.
61	Brixham AFC (9)	3–0	Elburton Villa (10)	204
62	Tadley Calleva (9)	4–1	Bridgwater United (9)	88
63	Bodmin Town (10)	2–5	Wells City (10)	79
64	Hartpury University (9)	1–0	East Cowes Victoria Athletic (10)	76
Sunday 10 November 2024
31	White Ensign (9)	2–0	West Essex (9)	102

== Third round proper ==
The draw for the third round proper was made on 11 November 2024.

Tie	Home team	Score	Away team	Att.
Saturday 7 December 2024
5	Wombwell Town (10)	0–4	Hallam (9)	203
9	Rugby Borough (9)	0–5	Heanor Town (9)	103
10	Newark Town (9)	1–1 (10–11 p)	Daventry Town (9)	315
16	Walsham-le-Willows (9)	2–1	Brantham Athletic (9)	87
17	March Town United (9)	1–0	Takeley (9)	303
21	VCD Athletic (9)	A–A	Windsor & Eton (10)	110
22	AFC Whyteleafe (9)	3–1	Tadley Calleva (9)	154
26	Faversham Town (9)	0–1	Erith & Belvedere (9)	225
31	Roman Glass St George (9)	2–0	Highworth Town (9)	100
32	Portishead Town (9)	6–1	Okehampton Argyle (10)	299
Wednesday 11 December 2024
3	South Liverpool (9)	0–2	Albion Sports (9)	141
Saturday 14 December 2024
24	Whitstable Town (9)	2–1	Jersey Bulls (9)	367
1	Crook Town (9)	2–0	Carlisle City (9)	262
2	Atherton Laburnum Rovers (10)	1–1 (7–6 p)	Ashton Town (10)	122
4	West Didsbury & Chorlton (9)	5–1	Silsden (9)	618
6	Redcar Athletic (9)	1–2	North Shields (9)	266
7	Clay Cross Town (10)	1–0	Melton Town (9)	131

Tie	Home team	Score	Away team	Att.
8	Whitchurch Alport (9)	3–1	Lincoln United (9)	120
11	Abbey Hulton United (10)	4–2	Droitwich Spa (10)	115
12	Winsford United (10)	1–2	Sutton United (Birmingham) (10)	397
13	Northampton ON Chenecks (9)	1–2	Bourne Town (9)	96
14	Dereham Town (9)	2–2 (7–6 p)	Harpenden Town (9)	200
15	London Lions (9)	5–0	Great Yarmouth Town (9)	84
18	White Ensign (9)	4–3	Thetford Town (9)	133
20	Spelthorne Sports (9)	0–5	Egham Town (9)	135
21	VCD Athletic (9)	2–0	Windsor & Eton (10)	263
23	Tring Athletic (9)	2–2 (2–4 p)	Fleet Town (9)	270
25	Epsom & Ewell (9)	2–1	Burnham (9)	60
27	AFC Stoneham (9)	4–0	Brixham AFC (9)	127
28	Downton (9)	0–2	Fareham Town (9)	132
29	Hartpury University (9)	1–0	Wells City (10)	64
30	Andover New Street (9)	1–1 (4–2 p)	Clevedon Town (9)	210
Saturday 21 December 2024
19	Tunbridge Wells (9)	2–2 (4–5 p)	Crawley Down Gatwick (9)	120
Match played at Crawley Down Gatwick

== Fourth round proper ==
The draw for the fourth round proper was made on 9 December 2024. Four tenth tier clubs remain: Atherton Laburnum Rovers, Sutton United (Birmingham), Clay Cross Town, and Abbey Hulton United.

Tie	Home team	Score	Away team	Att.
Saturday 11 January 2025
4	Sutton United (Birmingham) (10)	2–4	Bourne Town (9)	1,700
12	AFC Whyteleafe (9)	5–0	Dereham Town (9)	458
14	Portishead Town (9)	0–4	AFC Stoneham (9)	480
16	Roman Glass St George (9)	1–0	Andover New Street (9)	236
Roman Glass St George were removed from the competition for fielding an ineligible player.
Saturday 18 January 2025
2	Atherton Laburnum Rovers (10)	3–2	Hallam (9)	310
3	North Shields (9)	2–1	West Didsbury & Chorlton (9)	647

Tie	Home team	Score	Away team	Att.
5	Clay Cross Town (10)	1–5	Whitchurch Alport (9)	162
6	March Town United (9)	0–1	Daventry Town (9)	738
7	Abbey Hulton United (10)	0–2	Heanor Town (9)	263
8	VCD Athletic (9)	1–0	Epsom & Ewell (9)	170
9	Walsham-le-Willows (9)	1–1 (2–3 p)	Whitstable Town (9)	267
10	Crawley Down Gatwick (9)	1–2	Fleet Town (9)	330
11	Egham Town (9)	3–2	London Lions (9)	243
13	White Ensign (9)	1–1 (2–4 p)	Erith & Belvedere (9)	134
Sunday 19 January 2025
1	Albion Sports (9)	0–2	Crook Town (9)	232
15	Hartpury University (9)	1–0	Fareham Town (9)	251

== Fifth round proper ==
The draw for the fifth round proper was made on 13 January 2025. The final remaining tenth tier club, Atherton Laburnum Rovers, was eliminated during the fifth round.

Tie	Home team	Score	Away team	Att.
Saturday 1 February 2025
1	North Shields (9)	1–2	Whitchurch Alport (9)	585
2	Atherton Laburnum Rovers (10)	1–1 (4–5 p)	Bourne Town (9)	429
3	Heanor Town (9)	2–0	Crook Town (9)	615
4	VCD Athletic (9)	0–1	Hartpury University (9)	240
5	Andover New Street (9)	1–1 (6–5 p)	AFC Stoneham (9)	565
6	AFC Whyteleafe (9)	1–0	Egham Town (9)	773
7	Erith & Belvedere (9)	2–2 (4–2 p)	Daventry Town (9)	350
8	Whitstable Town (9)	2–1	Fleet Town (9)	1,121

== Quarter-finals ==
None of the teams remaining in this stage of the competition have ever reached the semi–finals, with Erith & Belvedere and Whitchurch Alport being the only two clubs remaining to have previously reached the FA Vase quarter-finals.

The draw took place on 3 February 2025.

Tie	Home team	Score	Away team	Att.
Saturday 1 March 2025
1	Whitstable Town (9)	3–2	Whitchurch Alport (9)	2,656
2	Hartpury University (9)	2–1	Erith & Belvedere (9)	256
3	Andover New Street (9)	1–0	Heanor Town (9)	953
4	AFC Whyteleafe (9)	1–0	Bourne Town (9)	1,540

== Semi-finals ==
None of the teams remaining in this stage of the competition had ever reached the semi–finals before 2024–25.

The draw took place on 3 March 2025.

=== First leg ===
29 March 2025
15:00 GMT

AFC Whyteleafe (9)	3–1	Andover New Street (9)
Bennett 22'; Mico 26'; Holder 90+10'		Postance 66'

Church Road, Whyteleafe
Attendance: 2,000
Referee: Robert Massey-Ellis
29 March 2025
15:00 GMT

Whitstable Town (9)	2–0	Hartpury University (9)
Jeche 11'; O'Mara 69'

The Belmont Ground, Whitstable
Attendance: 2,905
Referee: Andrew Humphries

=== Second leg ===
5 April 2025
15:00 GMT

Andover New Street (9)	0–1	AFC Whyteleafe (9)
		Bennett 4'

Foxcotte Park, Charlton
Attendance: 1,390

Andover New Street 1–4 AFC Whyteleafe on aggregate.

6 April 2025
15:00 GMT

Hartpury University (9)	0–0	Whitstable Town (9)

Hartpury University Stadium, Hartpury
Attendance: 905

Hartpury University 0–2 Whitstable Town on aggregate.

== Final ==
The final was played at Wembley Stadium.

11 May 2025
12:15 BST

AFC Whyteleafe	1–2 (a.e.t.)	Whitstable Town
Bennett 17'	Report	Smith 52'; Sithole 100'

Wembley Stadium, London
Attendance: 38,600
Referee: Ruebyn Ricardo (Leicestershire and Rutland)
