= Finley Shrimpton =

English footballer (born 2002)

Personal information
- Full name: Finley Thomas Shrimpton
- Date of birth: 24 August 2002 (age 24)
- Place of birth: Scunthorpe, England
- Position: Midfielder

Team information
- Current team: Macclesfield FC

Youth career
- 2017–2020: Scunthorpe United

Senior career*
Years	Team	Apps	(Gls)
2020–2025	Scunthorpe United	38	(2)
2020	→ Frickley Athletic (loan)	7	(0)
2021–2022	→ Grantham Town (loan)	19	(0)
2022	→ Cleethorpes Town (loan)	4	(0)
2022	→ Gainsborough Trinity (loan)	15	(0)
2024	→ Spennymoor Town (loan)	15	(2)
2024–2025	→ Spennymoor Town (loan)	28	(3)
2025–	Chester	29	(5)
- * Club domestic league appearances and goals as of 06:37, 2 March 2026 (UTC)

Finley Thomas Shrimpton is an English professional footballer who plays as a midfielder for National League club Macclesfield FC.

== Playing career ==
Born in Scunthorpe, Shrimpton joined Scunthorpe United's under-16 side in November 2017 following his release from Barnsley. He signed his first professional contract with Scunthorpe in the summer of 2020.

In September 2020, Shrimpton joined Frickley Athletic on loan. He made eight appearances in all competitions for the club.

Shrimpton made his professional debut on 24 August 2021 coming on as a substitute for Scunthorpe in an EFL Trophy defeat against Manchester City U23s.

At the end of the 2021–22 season, Scunthorpe exercised the one-year extension option on his contract.

On 7 September 2021, Shrimpton joined Northern Premier League club Grantham Town on loan until January 2022. Shrimpton made 19 league appearances for Grantham and also featured for the club in the FA Trophy. Shrimpton again went out loan in March 2022, this time in Cleethorpes Town for the remainder of the 2021–22 season. However, in April 2022, Shrimpton was recalled to Scunthorpe. He played four times for Cleethorpes. A day after his return to Scunthorpe, Shrimpton made his first league appearance for the club starting in a 4–0 defeat to Mansfield Town.

On 13 September 2022, Shrimpton signed on a one-month loan for Gainsborough Trinity. The deal was later extended by a further month. Shrimpton returned to his parent club on 8 December 2022.

On 16 February 2024, Shrimpton joined National League North club Spennymoor Town on a one-month loan deal. After impressing with The Moors, his loan was later extended until the end of the season.

On 15 November 2024, Shrimpton returned to Spennymoor Town on loan until the end of the season.

In May 2025, it was announced that Shrimpton had been released by Scunthorpe following the expiration of his contract.

== Honours ==
Spennymoor Town

- FA Trophy runner-up: 2024–25
