= Glen Taylor (footballer) =

English footballer (born 1990)

Personal information
- Date of birth: 11 May 1990 (age 36)
- Place of birth: Ashington, England
- Height: 1.91 m (6 ft 3 in)
- Position: Striker

Team information
- Current team: Spennymoor Town

Senior career*
Years	Team	Apps	(Gls)
- Ashington
- → North Shields (loan)
- Whitley Bay
- Ashington
2011–2012	Blyth Spartans	32	(7)
2012	Spennymoor Town		
2012–2015	Ashington		
2015–	Spennymoor Town		
- * Club domestic league appearances and goals as of 15:30, 1 June 2025 (UTC)

Glen Taylor (born 11 May 1990) is an English semi-professional footballer who plays as a striker for Spennymoor Town.

== Career ==
Born in Ashington, Taylor spent his early career with Ashington, North Shields and Whitley Bay, before signing for Blyth Spartans in August 2011. He signed for Spennymoor Town in 2012. He missed the 2013 FA Vase final with Spennymoor after leaving the club prematurely that season, to return to Ashington.

After spending time back at Ashington, Taylor re-joined Spennymoor Town in 2015. In January 2019 he extended his contract with the club, and in April 2019 he was awarded the National League North Player of the Year. In February 2022 he scored his 100th goal for the club, in his 200th appearance. He became Spennymoor's club record goalscorer in March 2022, with his 140th goal. As of May 2025, he had scored 210 goals in 394 appearances for the club. He captained Spennymoor as they lost the 2025 FA Trophy final on his 35th birthday on 11 May 2025.

In June 2025, a testimonial match for Taylor was announced.

In March 2026, Taylor received the Non-League Personality of the Year award as part of the Football Writers' Association Awards.

== Personal life ==
Taylor combined his playing career with a job as a teacher. His wife is also a teacher. Taylor said that he turned down chances to play at a higher level, due to having a young child, with a short-term professional contract not offering enough security for his family.
