= Prudhoe Youth Club F.C. =

Coordinates: 54°58′00.26″N 1°50′00.78″W

Prudhoe Youth Club
- Full name: Prudhoe Youth Club Football Club
- Founded: 1969; 57 years ago
- Ground: Essity Park, Prudhoe
- Chairman: Duncan Graham
- Manager: Dean Walker
- League: Northern League Division Two
- 2025–26: Northern League Division Two, 21st of 22
Home colours

Prudhoe Youth Club Football Club is a football club based in Prudhoe, England. They are currently members of the Northern League Division Two and play at Kimberley Park, groundsharing with Newcastle University.

== History ==
Prudhoe Youth Club were formed in 1969. In 2015, Prudhoe Youth Club joined the Northern Alliance Division Two, gaining promotion into Division One in 2018. The following year, Prudhoe Youth Club merged with Prudhoe Town. In 2022, the club was admitted into the Northern League Division Two.

The 22/23 season was a positive one for the Seniors. With over 14 separate scorers contributing to 64 goals, this earned the team 56 points, with 6 games to play.

== Ground ==
The club currently play at Essity Park (Locally known as the Tip-Top), Prudhoe, groundsharing with Newcastle University. With both teams playing in the Northern League 2, it has led to the rise of the "Essity Park derby".

== Squad ==
(From Last 5 games as of 01/02/23)

Goalkeepers: Liam Blair and Thomas White

Defenders: Danny Driver, Brad Rogers, Darren Graham, Finn Baty, Harrison Turnbull, Mark McKeekin

Midfielders: Adam Bell, Lutfur Karim, Will Morris, Harry Mitchell, Trae Rowlandson

Forwards: Craig Fairley, Matt Law, Josh Sott, Simon Farrier

== Records ==
- Best FA Vase performance: First round, 2024–25
