= Newcastle University F.C. =

Association football club in England

Coordinates: 54°58′00.26″N 1°50′00.78″W

Newcastle University
- Full name: Newcastle University Football Club
- Ground: Kimberley Park, Prudhoe
- Chairman: Kelly Scott
- Manager: Andy Jarman
- League: Northern League Division Two
- 2024–25: Northern League Division Two, 12th of 22
Home colours	Away colours

Newcastle University Football Club is a football club based in Newcastle upon Tyne, Tyne and Wear, England. They are current members of the Northern League Division Two and play at Kimberley Park, groundsharing with Prudhoe Youth Club.

== History ==
Newcastle University joined the Northern Alliance in the 1970s, leaving the league after finishing bottom in the 1978–79 season. In 1988, the club rejoined the Northern Alliance league system, being placed in Division One. In the 1991–1992 season, Newcastle University were relegated to Division Two, gaining promotion back to Division One in 1997. In 2000, Newcastle University gained promotion to the Northern Alliance Premier Division. After relegation and promotion in 2010 and 2016 respectively, Newcastle University won the 2017–18 Northern Football Alliance, dropping points in just five games out of thirty. Newcastle University entered the FA Vase for the first time in 2019–20.

== Ground ==
The club currently groundshare with Prudhoe Youth Club at Kimberley Park, having previously played at Cochrane Park in Newcastle.

== Records ==
- Best FA Vase performance: Third round proper, 2023–24
- Best League performance: 9th place in Northern League Division 2 (Tier 10), 2023-24

== Honours ==
- Northern Football Alliance Premier Division (Tier 11)
  - Winners: 2017–18
