= Football League 100 Legends =

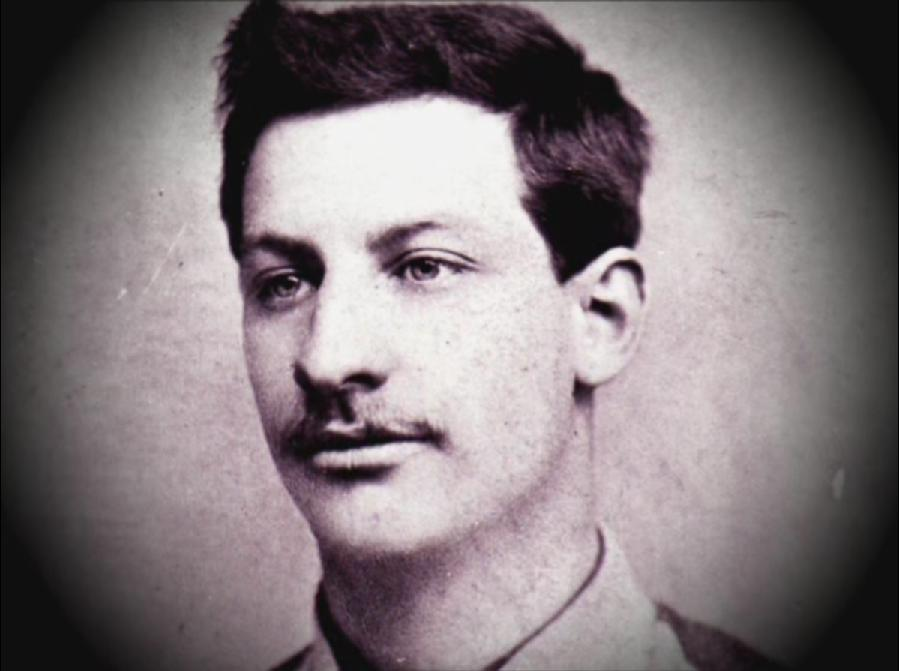
Billy Bassett played for West Bromwich Albion in The Football League's first season

The Football League 100 Legends is a list of 100 great association football players who played part or all of their professional career in English Football League and Premier League football. The players were selected in 1998 by a panel of journalists, including veteran reporter Bryon Butler, and the list was intended to reflect the League's history by including players from throughout the preceding 99 seasons. The Football League also announced plans for a gala dinner later in the season at which surviving legends would receive a specially commissioned award.

The list includes 34 players who began their playing careers before the Second World War, 37 who began their careers between the end of the war and 1980, and 29 whose professional careers began after that date. At the time of the list's publication, six of the legends were still active, all playing in the Premier League. The last of the players to play professionally was Ryan Giggs, who retired at the end of the 2013–14 season. All 100 of the legends played in The Football League except Dennis Bergkamp, who did not begin playing in England until after the Premier League replaced the Football League as the highest level of the English football league system in 1992.

At the time of its announcement, the Football League chief executive Richard Scudamore stated that the list was "almost impossible to better"; however, contributors to the BBC News website thought differently, providing many alternative suggestions. (Note: Including Peter Beardsley, Peter Bonetti, Stan Bowles, Terry Butcher, Trevor Brooking, Ian Callaghan, Jack Charlton, Alan Clarke, Brian Clough, Steve Coppell, Paddy Crerand, Tony Currie, Ron Davies, Tommy Docherty, Eddie Gray, Bruce Grobbelaar, Alan Hudson, Emlyn Hughes, Mark Hughes, Roger Hunt, Roy Keane, Steve Kember, Francis Lee, Matthew Le Tissier, Mark Lawrenson, Duncan McKenzie, Paul Madeley, Rodney Marsh, Terry McDermott, Phil Neal, Peter Osgood, Michael Owen, Stuart Pearce, Jesse Pennington, Norman Whiteside and Ian Wright.)

== Legends ==
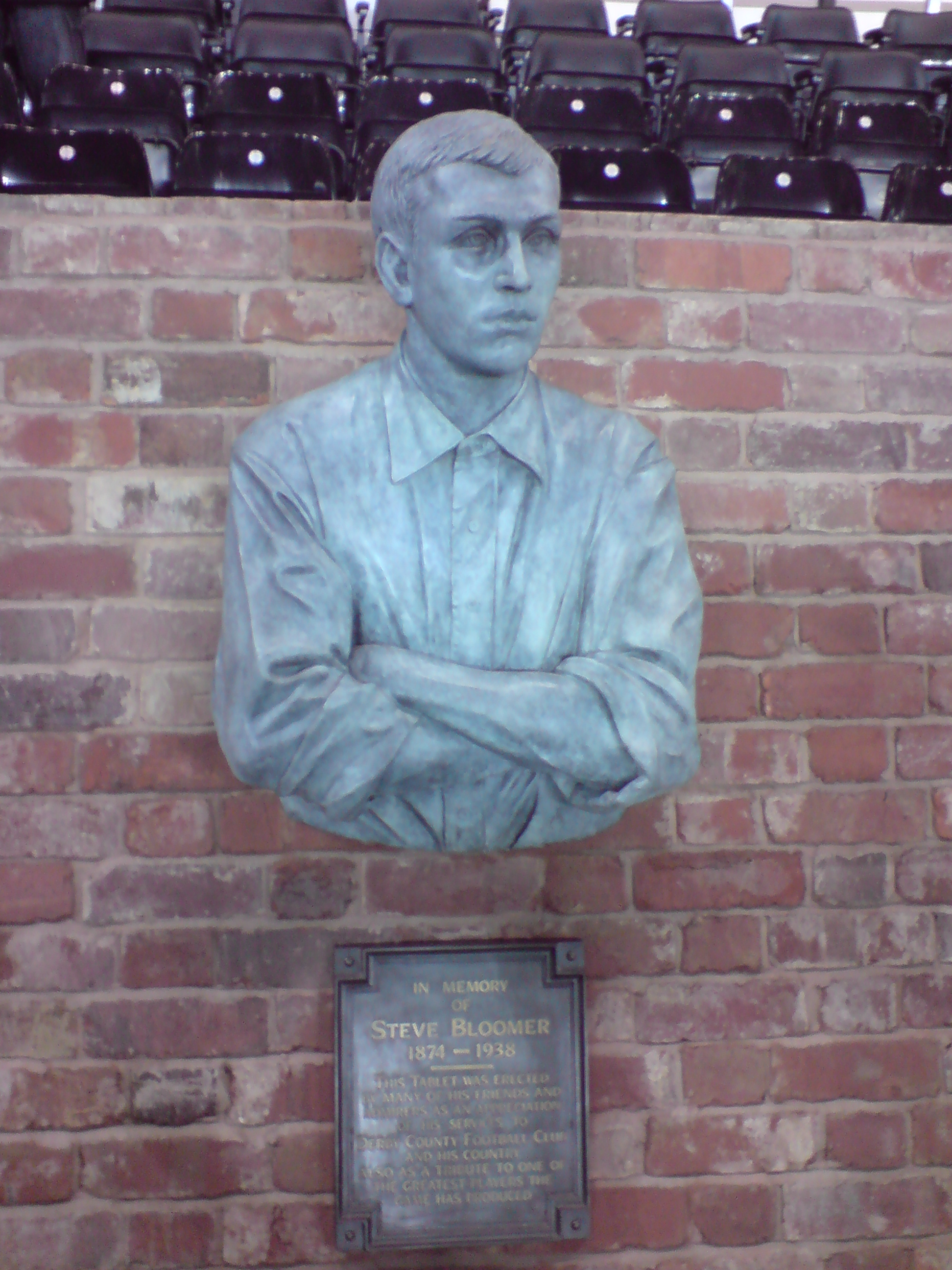
A statue of Steve Bloomer, who was honoured for his career with Derby County and Middlesbrough before the First World War

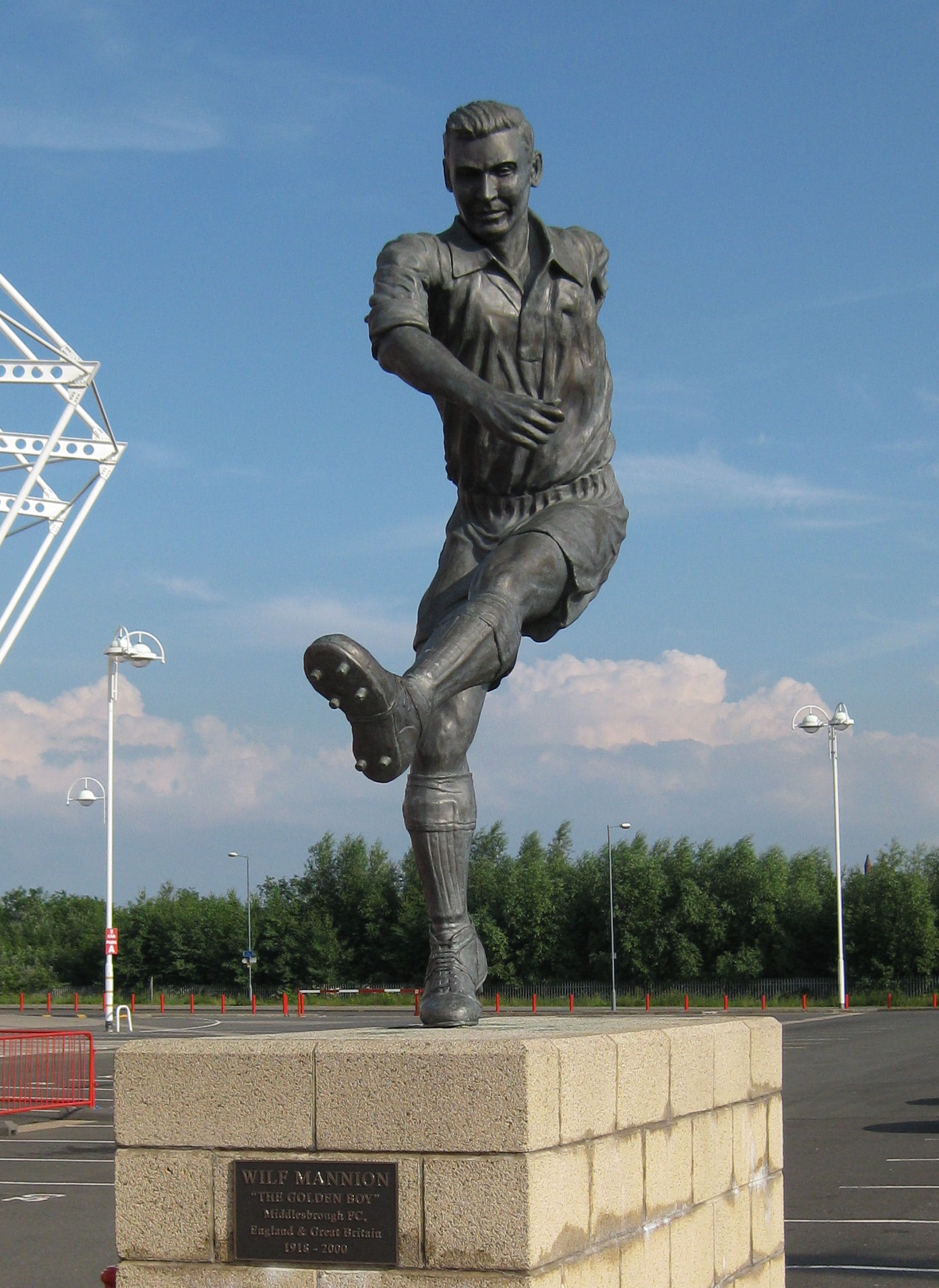
A statue of Wilf Mannion, whose career spanned either side of the Second World War

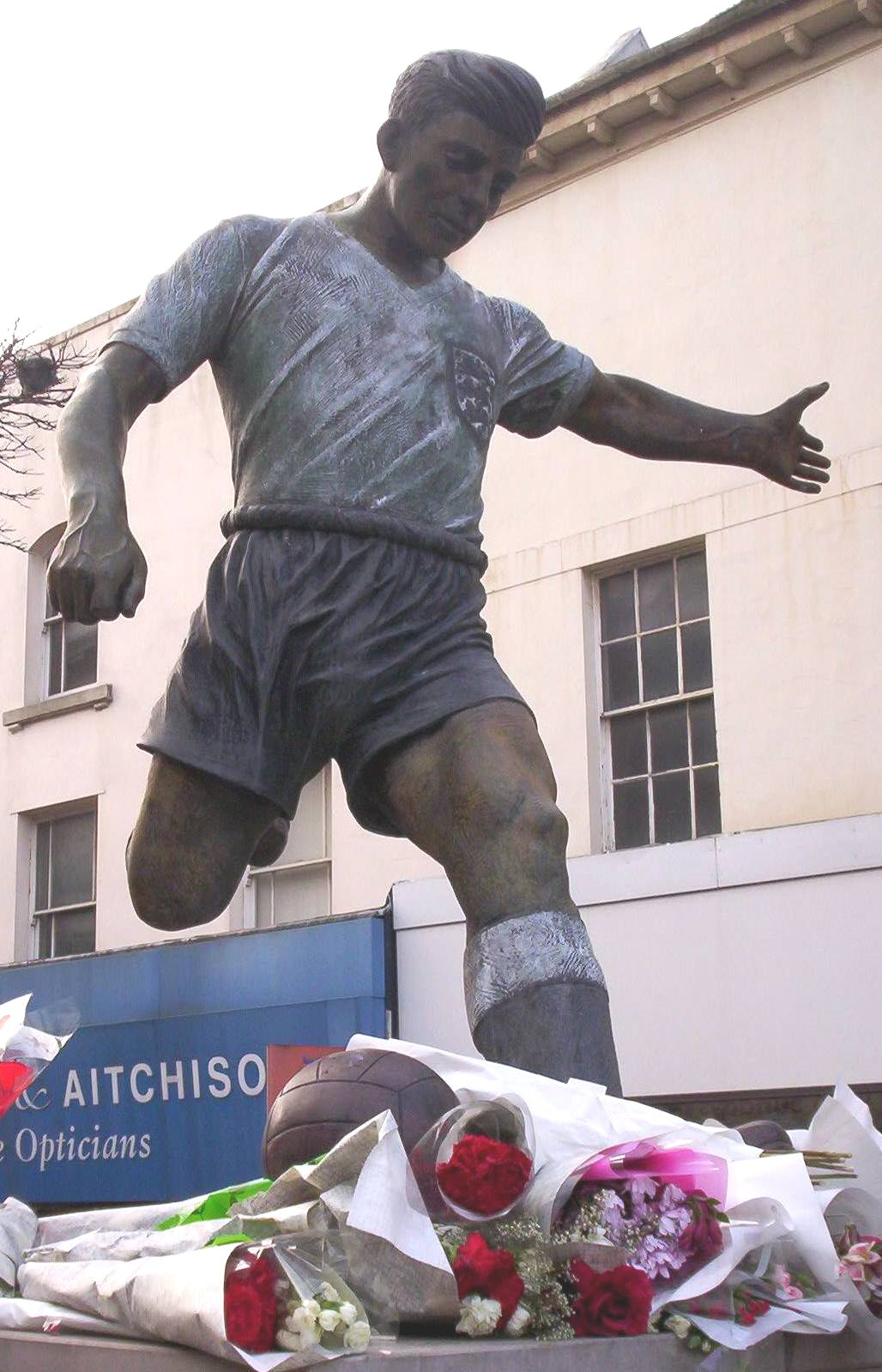
A statue of Duncan Edwards, who died at the age of 21 in the Munich air disaster

Name	Football League/Premier League club(s)	Career
(England) Billy Bassett	West Bromwich Albion	1888–1899
(Scotland) Archie Hunter	Aston Villa	1888–1890
(England) John Goodall	Preston North End, Derby County, New Brighton Tower, Glossop North End	1888–1904
(England) Steve Bloomer	Derby County, Middlesbrough	1892–1915
(Wales) Billy Meredith	Northwich Victoria, Manchester City, Manchester United	1893–1925
(England) Bob Crompton	Blackburn Rovers	1896–1921
(England) William Foulke	Sheffield United, Chelsea, Bradford City	1894–1908
(England) Alf Common	Sunderland, Sheffield United, Middlesbrough, Arsenal, Preston North End	1900–1915
(England) Sam Hardy	Chesterfield, Liverpool, Aston Villa, Nottingham Forest	1902–1926
(Northern Ireland) Bill McCracken	Newcastle United	1904–1924
(England) Viv Woodward	Tottenham Hotspur, Chelsea	1908–1915
(England) Clem Stephenson	Aston Villa, Huddersfield Town	1910–1930
(England) Charles Buchan	Sunderland, Arsenal	1910–1929
(Northern Ireland) Elisha Scott	Liverpool	1912–1934
(England) David Jack	Plymouth Argyle, Bolton Wanderers, Arsenal	1919–1935
(England) Dixie Dean	Tranmere Rovers, Everton, Notts County	1923–1939
(England) George Camsell	Durham City, Middlesbrough	1924–1939
(Scotland) Hughie Gallacher	Newcastle United, Chelsea, Derby County, Notts County, Grimsby Town, Gateshead	1925–1939
(England) Harry Hibbs	Birmingham	1925–1939
(Scotland) Alex James	Preston North End, Arsenal	1925–1938
(England) Eddie Hapgood	Arsenal	1927–1939
(England) Cliff Bastin	Exeter City, Arsenal	1927–1948
(England) Wilf Copping	Leeds United, Arsenal	1930–1939
(England) Stanley Matthews	Stoke City, Blackpool	1931–1966
(England) Ted Drake	Southampton, Arsenal	1931–1939
(England) Joe Mercer	Everton, Arsenal	1932–1954
(England) Raich Carter	Sunderland, Derby County, Hull City	1932–1953
(Northern Ireland) Peter Doherty	Blackpool, Manchester City, Derby County, Huddersfield Town, Doncaster Rovers	1933–1954
(England) Frank Swift	Manchester City	1933–1951
(England) Tommy Lawton	Burnley, Everton, Chelsea, Notts County, Brentford, Arsenal	1935–1957
(England) Wilf Mannion	Middlesbrough, Hull City	1936–1956
(England) George Hardwick	Middlesbrough, Oldham Athletic	1937–1956
(Republic of Ireland) Johnny Carey	Manchester United	1937–1954
(England) Stan Mortensen	Blackpool, Hull City, Southport	1938–1958
(England) Neil Franklin	Stoke City, Hull City, Crewe Alexandra, Stockport County	1946–1958
(Wales) Trevor Ford	Swansea City, Aston Villa, Sunderland, Cardiff City, Newport County	1946–1961
(England) Nat Lofthouse	Bolton Wanderers	1946–1961
(England) Tom Finney	Preston North End	1946–1960
(England) Alf Ramsey	Southampton, Tottenham Hotspur	1946–1955
(England) Len Shackleton	Bradford (Park Avenue), Newcastle United, Sunderland	1946–1958
(England) Jimmy Dickinson	Portsmouth	1946–1965
(England) Arthur Rowley	West Bromwich Albion, Fulham, Leicester City, Shrewsbury Town	1946–1965
(Scotland) Billy Liddell	Liverpool	1946–1961
(England) Billy Wright	Wolverhampton Wanderers	1946–1959
(England) Jackie Milburn	Newcastle United	1946–1957
(Wales) John Charles	Leeds United, Cardiff City	1948–1966
(Wales) Ivor Allchurch	Swansea Town, Cardiff City, Newcastle United	1948–1968
(Northern Ireland) Danny Blanchflower	Barnsley, Aston Villa, Tottenham Hotspur	1948–1964
(Germany) Bert Trautmann	Manchester City	1949–1964
(Northern Ireland) Jimmy McIlroy	Burnley, Stoke City, Oldham Athletic	1950–1968
(England) Tommy Taylor	Barnsley, Manchester United	1950–1958
(Wales) Cliff Jones	Swansea Town, Tottenham Hotspur, Fulham	1952–1970
(England) Johnny Haynes	Fulham	1952–1970
(England) Duncan Edwards	Manchester United	1953–1958
(England) Jimmy Armfield	Blackpool	1954–1971
(England) Terry Paine	Southampton, Hereford United	1956–1977
(England) Bobby Charlton	Manchester United, Preston North End	1956–1975
(England) Jimmy Greaves	Chelsea, Tottenham Hotspur, West Ham United	1957–1971
(Scotland) Denis Law	Huddersfield Town, Manchester City, Manchester United	1956–1974
(England) Gordon Banks	Chesterfield, Leicester City, Stoke City	1958–1973
(Scotland) Dave Mackay	Tottenham Hotspur, Derby County, Swindon Town	1958–1972
(England) Bobby Moore	West Ham United, Fulham	1958–1977
(England) Alan Mullery	Fulham, Tottenham Hotspur	1958–1976
(England) Geoff Hurst	West Ham United, Stoke City, West Bromwich Albion	1959–1976
(England) Nobby Stiles	Manchester United, Middlesbrough, Preston North End	1959–1974
(Republic of Ireland) Johnny Giles	Manchester United, Leeds United, West Bromwich Albion	1959–1977
(Scotland) Billy Bremner	Leeds United, Hull City, Doncaster Rovers	1959–1982
(Scotland) Frank McLintock	Leicester City, Arsenal, Queens Park Rangers	1959–1977
(Scotland) Alex Young	Everton, Stockport County	1960–1969
(England) Martin Peters	West Ham United, Tottenham Hotspur, Norwich City, Sheffield United	1960–1981
(England) Tommy Smith	Liverpool, Swansea City	1962–1979
(England) Norman Hunter	Leeds United, Bristol City, Barnsley	1962–1983
(Northern Ireland) Pat Jennings	Watford, Tottenham Hotspur, Arsenal	1962–1985
(England) Alan Ball	Blackpool, Everton, Arsenal, Southampton, Bristol Rovers	1962–1984
(England) Colin Bell	Bury, Manchester City	1963–1979
(Northern Ireland) George Best	Manchester United, Stockport County, Fulham, AFC Bournemouth	1963–1983
(England) Peter Shilton	Leicester City, Stoke City, Nottingham Forest, Southampton, Derby County, Plymouth Argyle, Bolton Wanderers, West Ham United, Leyton Orient	1965–1997
(England) Ray Clemence	Scunthorpe United, Liverpool, Tottenham Hotspur	1965–1988
(England) Malcolm Macdonald	Fulham, Luton Town, Newcastle United, Arsenal	1968–1979
(England) Kevin Keegan	Scunthorpe United, Liverpool, Southampton, Newcastle United	1968–1984
(England) Trevor Francis	Birmingham City, Nottingham Forest, Manchester City, Queens Park Rangers, Sheffield Wednesday	1970–1995
(Scotland) Graeme Souness	Middlesbrough, Liverpool	1972–1984
(Republic of Ireland) Liam Brady	Arsenal, West Ham United	1973–1990
(England) Glenn Hoddle	Tottenham Hotspur, Swindon Town, Chelsea	1974–1996
(England) Bryan Robson	West Bromwich Albion, Manchester United, Middlesbrough	1974–1997
(Scotland) Alan Hansen	Liverpool	1977–1990
(Scotland) Kenny Dalglish	Liverpool	1977–1990
(England) Gary Lineker	Leicester City, Everton, Tottenham Hotspur	1978–1993
(Wales) Ian Rush	Chester City, Liverpool, Leeds United, Newcastle United, Sheffield United, Wrexham	1978–1999
(Argentina) Ossie Ardiles	Tottenham Hotspur, Blackburn Rovers, Queens Park Rangers, Swindon Town	1978–1990
(Wales) Neville Southall	Bury, Everton, Port Vale, Southend United, Stoke City, Torquay United, Bradford City	1980–2000
(Republic of Ireland) Paul McGrath	Manchester United, Aston Villa, Derby County, Sheffield United	1981–1998
(England) John Barnes	Watford, Liverpool, Newcastle United, Charlton Athletic	1981–1999
(England) Tony Adams	Arsenal	1983–2002
(England) Paul Gascoigne	Newcastle United, Tottenham Hotspur, Middlesbrough, Everton, Burnley, Boston United	1985–2004
(England) Alan Shearer	Southampton, Blackburn Rovers, Newcastle United	1987–2006
(Wales) Ryan Giggs	Manchester United	1990–2014
(France) Eric Cantona	Leeds United, Manchester United	1991–1997
(Denmark) Peter Schmeichel	Manchester United, Aston Villa, Manchester City	1991–2003
(Netherlands) Dennis Bergkamp	Arsenal	1995–2006
