= Middlesbrough F.C. =

Association football club in England

Middlesbrough
- Full name: Middlesbrough Football Club
- Nicknames: The Boro; Teessiders; Smoggies (supporters)
- Founded: 20 October 1876; 150 years ago
- Stadium: Riverside Stadium
- Capacity: 33,746
- Owner: Steve Gibson
- Chairman: Steve Gibson
- Head coach: Kim Hellberg
- League: EFL Championship
- 2025–26: EFL Championship, 5th of 24
- Website: mfc.co.uk
Home colours	Away colours	Third colours

Middlesbrough Football Club (/ˈmɪdəlzbrə/ MID-əlz-brə) is a professional association football club based in Middlesbrough, North Yorkshire. They compete in the Championship, the second tier of English football. Nicknamed "the Boro", they were formed in 1876 and are the 12th oldest football league club in England and Wales. The club have played at the Riverside Stadium since 1995, having previously played at Ayresome Park for 92 years, from 1903 to 1995.

Middlesbrough were one of the founding members of the Premier League in 1992, and have spent all but two seasons of their entire history as a professional club competing within the top two tiers of English football. Their highest league finish to date was third place in the top flight in the 1913–14 season. The outbreak of the First World War stunted their push for a first top division title, though the club pushed again during the inter-war years, finishing fourth in the 1938–39 season before the Second World War halted the English leagues and again prevented a push for a first title. The club came within minutes of folding in 1986 before they were saved by a consortium led by board member and later chairman Steve Gibson. A remarkable recovery saw the club immediately earn back-to-back promotions to the top division in the 1986–87 and 1987–88 seasons. The club were runners-up in the FA Cup and League Cup in 1997 while also being relegated following a controversial 3-point deduction, and losing another League Cup final the following season. Under Steve McClaren, the club won the League Cup in 2004, its first major silverware, and reached the 2006 UEFA Cup final. The club has played one Premier League season since relegation in 2009.

Middlesbrough is the only major professional football club in the greater Teesside area (the 14th biggest urban area in England), the Tees Valley, and the county of North Yorkshire (the largest county in England by area). The club has regional rivalries with Newcastle United F.C (the Tyne–Tees derby) and Sunderland A.F.C. (the Tees–Wear derby).

The club's traditional kit is red with white detailing, often in the form of a white chest band. The home shorts and sock colours have interchangeably been shifted between red and white, complementing the red shirt that was adopted in 1899. The various crests throughout the club's history, the most recent of which was adopted in 2026, incorporates a lion within a roundel crest linking to Teesside landmarks. For the 2026–27 season this has been made golden with 150 years printed below it.

== History ==
=== Formation and early years (1876–1914) ===
Chart showing the progress of Middlesbrough's league finishes since the 1899–1900 season

Middlesbrough were formed in 1876, and won the FA Amateur Cup in 1895 and again in 1898. The club turned professional in 1889, but reverted to amateur status in 1892. They turned professional permanently in 1899. After three seasons, they won promotion to the First Division, where they would remain for the next 22 years.

In 1903, the club moved to Ayresome Park, their home for the next 92 years. In 1905, the club sanctioned the transfer of Alf Common for £1,000, a record fee. In the same year, Tim Williamson became the first Middlesbrough player to play international football.

Over these early years in the top flight, their form fluctuated greatly, rising to sixth in 1907–08 before dropping to 17th two seasons later. The club rose to their highest league finish to date, third, in 1913–14. The First World War soon intervened, and football was suspended.

=== Ups and downs (1914–1966) ===
Before league football resumed, Middlesbrough won the Northern Victory League, but the team were unable to maintain their previous form and finished the 1919–20 season in mid-table. They remained in the First Division for the next few seasons, but were relegated in 1923–24 after finishing bottom, 10 points adrift of their nearest rivals. Three seasons later, they won the Division Two title. During that season, debutant George Camsell, who had signed from Third Division North side Durham City the previous season, finished with a record 59 league goals, which included nine hat-tricks. He would continue as top scorer for each of the next 10 seasons. Middlesbrough's tenure back in the top flight lasted only one season, and the club were relegated. They were promoted at the first attempt in 1928–29, winning another Second Division title. The club remained in the First Division until 1954.

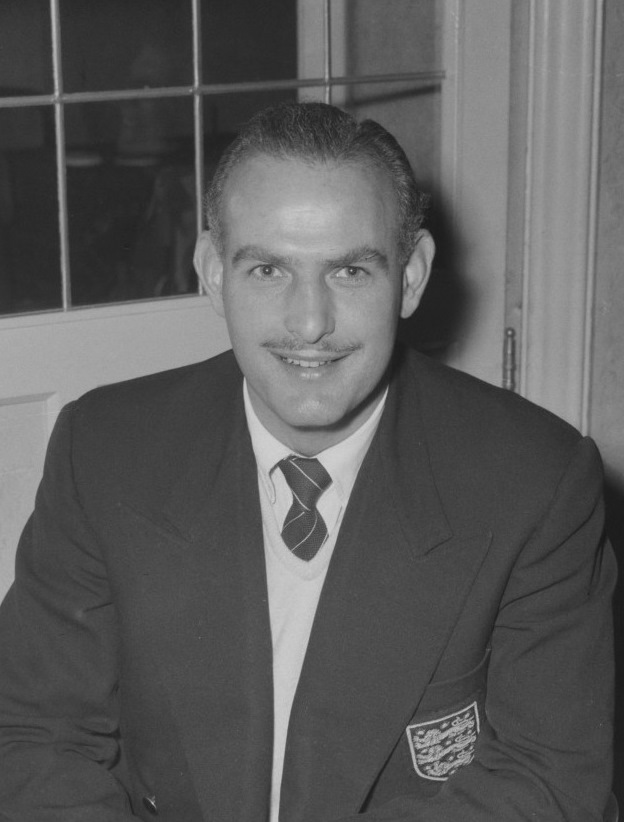
George Hardwick, a Middlesbrough and England player, later a manager and coach

The decade before the Second World War saw the emergence of Wilf Mannion and George Hardwick, both of whom would go on to become England internationals in the years ahead. Middlesbrough climbed to fourth in the last full season before the war, and were expected to challenge for the title the following season, but the war intervened. After the war, the club was unable to recover the form of the previous seasons before the war, hovering around mid-table and exiting in the early rounds of the FA Cup. Soon after the war, the team began to falter, and were relegated in 1953–54. This was the start of a 20-year spell outside the top division, but this was the spell too that saw the emergence of one of the club's top goalscorers, Brian Clough, who scored 204 goals in 222 games, before he left for Sunderland.

On 6 May 1950 Middlesbrough were represented by a Black player for the first time, Jamaican-born Lindy Delapenha making his debut in an away game against Fulham on that date. In total he went on to make 270 appearances, scoring 92 goals, before he left for Mansfield Town after the 1957–58 season. Over that period, Middlesbrough maintained reasonable progress in the Second Division, but were never serious contenders for promotion. After a fourth-place finish in 1962–63, the club endured a steady decline and were relegated to the Third Division for the first time in their history in 1966.

=== Resurgence, 'Charlton's Champions', and financial crisis (1966–1994) ===
New manager Stan Anderson returned the club to the second flight at the first attempt. Middlesbrough would not finish below ninth during the next six seasons in the Second Division, finishing 4th (just outside the top three promotion winning places at the time) on three of those occasions.

In 1973, Jack Charlton took over as manager and guided the team back to the top flight. A team led on the pitch by Willie Maddren and Bobby Murdoch, and including a young Graeme Souness, clinched promotion with seven games to spare, finishing with a then-league record 65 points (based on the 2 points for a win format), 15 points ahead of second-placed Luton Town. After a very promising start to their first campaign back in the first division Bob Paisley, manager of eventual runners up Liverpool, tipped Middlesbrough as favourites to win the league, however they ultimately fell short finishing seventh. Middlesbrough won their first silverware as a professional side in the 1975–76 season, lifting the Anglo-Scottish Cup in its inaugural season after a two-legged final win over Fulham.

In 1979, John Neal made the club's first international signing, with Boško Janković arriving from Željezničar Sarajevo.

The club experienced severe financial difficulties during the mid-1980s. Middlesbrough were dropping down the table, and finished 19th in the 1984–85 season. In April 1986, the club had to borrow £30,000 from the Professional Footballers' Association (PFA) to pay wages. The final game of the season saw Middlesbrough relegated to the Third Division again. That summer, the club called in the Provisional Liquidator, and, shortly afterwards, the club was wound up and the gates to Ayresome Park were padlocked. Without the £350,000 capital required for Football League registration, a new rule, the club risked folding permanently. Steve Gibson, however, a member of the board at the time, brought together a consortium, and with 10 minutes to spare before the deadline they completed their registration with the Football League for the 1986–87 season. Following the registration came both a change of club crest and a change of the official company name to Middlesbrough Football and Athletic Company (1986) Ltd.

Over the next two seasons, Middlesbrough gained successive promotions into Division Two and then into Division One, the latter being the first and only time a second-tier side directly relegated a first tier side through the English Football League play-offs. The next season however, they came straight back down to the Second Division, despite having being seventh in the league in November and outside the relegation zone until the day after the season. Early in the 1989-90 campaign, defender Gary Pallister was sold to Manchester United for £2.3 million, one of the highest fees in English football at the time. Following another promotion in 1992, Middlesbrough became one of the founding members of the FA Premier League when it was launched in the 1992–93 season, but were relegated after just one season.

=== Bryan Robson years (1994–2001) ===
Player-manager Bryan Robson, from Manchester United, took charge in 1994. Following promotion to the Premier League Middlesbrough made high-profile purchases like Brazilian international Juninho and previous season's Champions League final goalscorer and Italian international Fabrizio Ravanelli. A difficult 1996–97 season, however, was compounded by a deduction of three points imposed just after Christmas as punishment for the club's failure to fulfil a fixture against Blackburn Rovers, which ultimately resulted in relegation, despite the club taking guidance from the Premier League itself regarding the integrity of a match that would have included a number of debutants had Middlesbrough played due to illness in the Boro squad. At the same time, the club reached both the League and FA Cup finals for the first time, but lost both games. Despite being in the second tier, they were again runners-up in the League Cup final the next year.

Despite losing high-profile players Ravanelli and Juninho due to relegation, Middlesbrough were promoted back to the Premier League at the first attempt, in 1998. The following season saw them settle well and they had a 12-game unbeaten run midway through 1998–99, including a 3–2 win at Old Trafford In December 1998 during which they took a 3–0 lead; it was Manchester United's only home defeat during their treble-winning season. Middlesbrough continued to stay secure in mid-table the following season, due mainly to the goals of Hamilton Ricard and the signings of prominent players such as Paul Ince and Christian Ziege. In 2000–01, they had a brief relegation scare that was solved with the arrival of Terry Venables as co-manager, and a 3–0 win away at Arsenal in April was the team's best result. The trend of buying high profile European-based players continued with the acquisitions of Christian Karembeu and Alen Bokšić. Bryan Robson left the club before the start of 2001–02 season, having served as manager for seven years.

=== Venture into Europe (2001–2009) ===
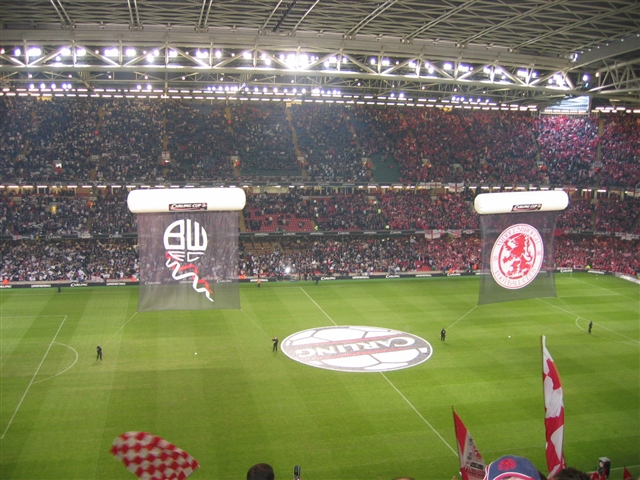
The 2004 League Cup final at the Millennium Stadium

After Venables decided not to take on the role of full time manager, in June 2001 Manchester United assistant coach Steve McClaren was appointed to replace Robson.

In his first season, McClaren led Middlesbrough to a respectable 12th place league finish and an FA Cup semi final, narrowly losing 1–0 to Arsenal. A slight improvement in the league saw the club finish 11th the following season. The 2003–04 season saw the club again finish 11th in the league, but much more significantly win a first major trophy by beating Bolton Wanderers 2–1 in the League Cup final. The League Cup win also ensured that Middlesbrough would qualify for Europe – the UEFA Cup – for the first time – the following season, where they reached the last 16 of the competition. UEFA Cup qualification was achieved for the second consecutive year after a 1–1 away draw with Manchester City on the final game of the season. The match concluded with a dramatic last minute late penalty save by goalkeeper Mark Schwarzer which saw Middlesbrough finish above City in 7th place and qualify for Europe again.

Middlesbrough enjoyed one of its most successful cup campaigns to date in the 2005–2006 season. Domestically the club reached the League Cup quarter final and the FA Cup semi final, losing out to a late goal in a 1–0 loss to West Ham at Villa Park. The club also reached the 2006 UEFA Cup final following two miraculous last minute comebacks from 3–0 down on aggregate in the quarter and semi finals against FC Basel and Steaua Bucharest respectively, however ultimately fell short losing 4–0 to Sevilla in the final in Eindhoven. McClaren's teams featured local youth players such as Stewart Downing, Adam Johnson and James Morrison as well as experienced international players such as forward trio Yakubu, Mark Viduka and Jimmy Floyd Hasselbaink, and midfielder Gaizka Mendieta. Middlesbrough fielded the youngest starting 11 (average age 20) in the final Premier League game in the 2005–06 season, against Fulham. Nine players were teenagers – all English – and two more came on as substitutes.

Following the European Cup final loss, McClaren left to manage the England national team, and captain Gareth Southgate took over as manager. Despite not having the coaching qualifications, he was allowed by the Premier League board to continue after receiving special dispensation. Southgate led the club to a 12th-placed finish and an FA Cup quarter final in his first season as manager. In the subsequent 2007–2008 season, Middlesbrough again reached the FA Cup quarter final, but lost to Championship side Cardiff City. Middlesbrough eventually finished 13th in the league, defeating Manchester City 8–1 on the final day.

In January 2008, the club broke its record transfer fee, paying £13.6 million for Brazilian international striker Afonso Alves. The club was relegated to the Championship at the end of the 2008–09 season in 19th place.

=== Decline, brief revival and relegation (2009–2017) ===
Middlesbrough sacked Gareth Southgate as manager in October 2009, when Southgate's team were one point from leading the Championship, and replaced him with Gordon Strachan. At the time of Southgate's dismissal, Boro were fourth in the Championship but their form under Strachan declined and they finished mid-table. On 18 October 2010, Strachan resigned and was later replaced by Tony Mowbray. Following a poor run of form at the start of the 2013–14 campaign, Mowbray left the club with immediate effect on 21 October.

Aitor Karanka, a former assistant coach at Real Madrid to José Mourinho, became the new Middlesbrough manager. He became the first non-British manager at the club, and led Boro to a 12th-place finish. In Karanka's first full season in charge, Middlesbrough finished fourth and thus qualified for the 2015 Football League play-offs. After defeating Brentford 5–1 on aggregate in the semi-final, the club lost 2–0 to Norwich City at Wembley Stadium in the final. The following 2015–16 season ended in dramatic fashion. The final match of the ordinary season was a head to head between 2nd placed Boro and 3rd placed Brighton & Hove Albion at The Riverside. Boro required 1 point from the match to finish above Brighton in second place and secure automatic promotion. After taking a first half lead, they were pegged back, but ultimately held on for the draw, securing promotion back to the Premier League.

Middlesbrough dismissed Karanka in March 2017 following a poor run of form, and the team were relegated in 19th place, after just one season back in the top flight. The team won only 5 league games, and scored 27 goals, the lowest in the league.

=== Return to the Championship (2017–present) ===
The club appointed former Leeds United manager Garry Monk as manager in the off-season. Expectations at the club were high, having spent close to £50 million in the transfer window on player purchases, in order to mount an immediate promotion challenge back to the Premier League. Monk left in December, with Middlesbrough ninth in the Championship, and Tony Pulis was appointed as his replacement. Pulis led the side to finish 5th in the table, however, they lost in the play-off semi-finals to Aston Villa. In the following season, a poor finish to the season caused them to finish 7th and miss out on the play-offs by one point.

When Pulis's contract was not extended, he was replaced by former Middlesbrough defender and first team coach, Jonathan Woodgate on 14 June 2019 on a three-year contract. Woodgate was dismissed with the club only outside of the relegation zone on goal difference with eight games left of the 2019–20 season, and Neil Warnock was appointed as his replacement on the same day. Warnock ensured survival from relegation, securing safety on the final day of the season and a 17th-place finish. On 6 November 2021, Middlesbrough parted company with Warnock, who was replaced by Chris Wilder the following day. After 11 months in charge, Wilder was dismissed with the club in 22nd position.

Former Manchester United midfielder Michael Carrick was appointed as his successor and led Boro to a fourth-place finish, but lost in the play-off semi-finals against Coventry City. On 26 May 2023, the club officially became affiliated with the women's team. In the 2023–24 season, Middlesbrough reached the semi-finals of the League Cup for the first time since 2004. Despite defeating Chelsea in the first leg, Middlesbrough lost 6–2 on aggregate. Carrick was dismissed in June 2025 with Rob Edwards replacing him. However, after a promising start to the season that saw the club enter the automatic promotion spaces, Edwards left in November 2025 to become the head coach of Wolverhampton Wanderers.

On 24 November 2025 Kim Hellberg was named as the successor to Rob Edwards.

In May 2026, Southampton defeated Middlesbrough 2–1 on aggregate (after extra time) in the EFL Championship play-off semi-final. Two days before the first leg of the semi-final, Middlesbrough complained that a member of Southampton's staff had been observed attempting to watch one of their training sessions in the build-up to the tie, and on the day before the first leg, Southampton were charged with breaching EFL regulations. An Independent Disciplinary Commission ruled that Southampton be expelled from the play-offs and receive a four-point deduction for the 2026–27 Championship season. Middlesbrough were reinstated to the play-off final, where they were defeated 1–0 by Hull City at Wembley. The incident was widely referred to in the media as "Spygate".

== Colours and crest ==
Early Middlesbrough F.C. kit

Middlesbrough F.C. crest (1986–2007)

Middlesbrough's original home kit upon election to the Football League in 1899 was a white home shirt with red shorts, and they did not adopt their colours of blue and white until later that season. Previous kits included a white shirt with a red and white polka dotted collar from around 1889. The Middlesbrough kit has remained broadly the same since 1899; a red shirt with white detailing, with shorts and socks of either red or white. The distinctive broad white stripe across the chest was introduced by Jack Charlton in 1973 (following an attempt to change the home shirt to a Leeds United-style white shirt), and brought back for a one-off in 1997–98, and, then again, for the 2000–01 and 2004–05 seasons due to popular demand. The club subsequently announced in December 2007 that the club would allow fans to decide via an online and text vote whether the white band should return for the following season. On 8 January 2008, the club announced that, with 77.4% of voters voting in its favour, the white band would return to the home kit, and that fans would choose the final shirt appearance from a selection of three designs, of which the winner was announced on 7 May 2008.

The Middlesbrough crest has gone through four changes since the formation of the club. Initially, the badge was simply the town of Middlesbrough's crest with a red lion instead of a blue lion in order to fit in with the club's colours. Following the adoption of the white band on the shirts in 1973, only the red lion remained with the letters "M.F.C" underneath in red. This was further adapted following the reformation of the club in 1986 to a circular crest with the lion in the middle and the words "Middlesbrough Football Club 1986" around the circle in order to reflect this new era. In 2007, Middlesbrough changed their crest again, this time with the lion inside a shield and the words "Middlesbrough Football Club 1876" underneath. The club's chairman Steve Gibson stated that the intention was to reflect the club's long history and not just their post-liquidation status. On 16 October 2025, Middlesbrough announced a new crest to be used from the 2026–27 season onwards, signalling a return to the all-familiar roundel shape after 19 years and tie in with the club's 150th anniversary celebrations, with a special version of the new crest to be used during that anniversary season.

=== Kit information ===
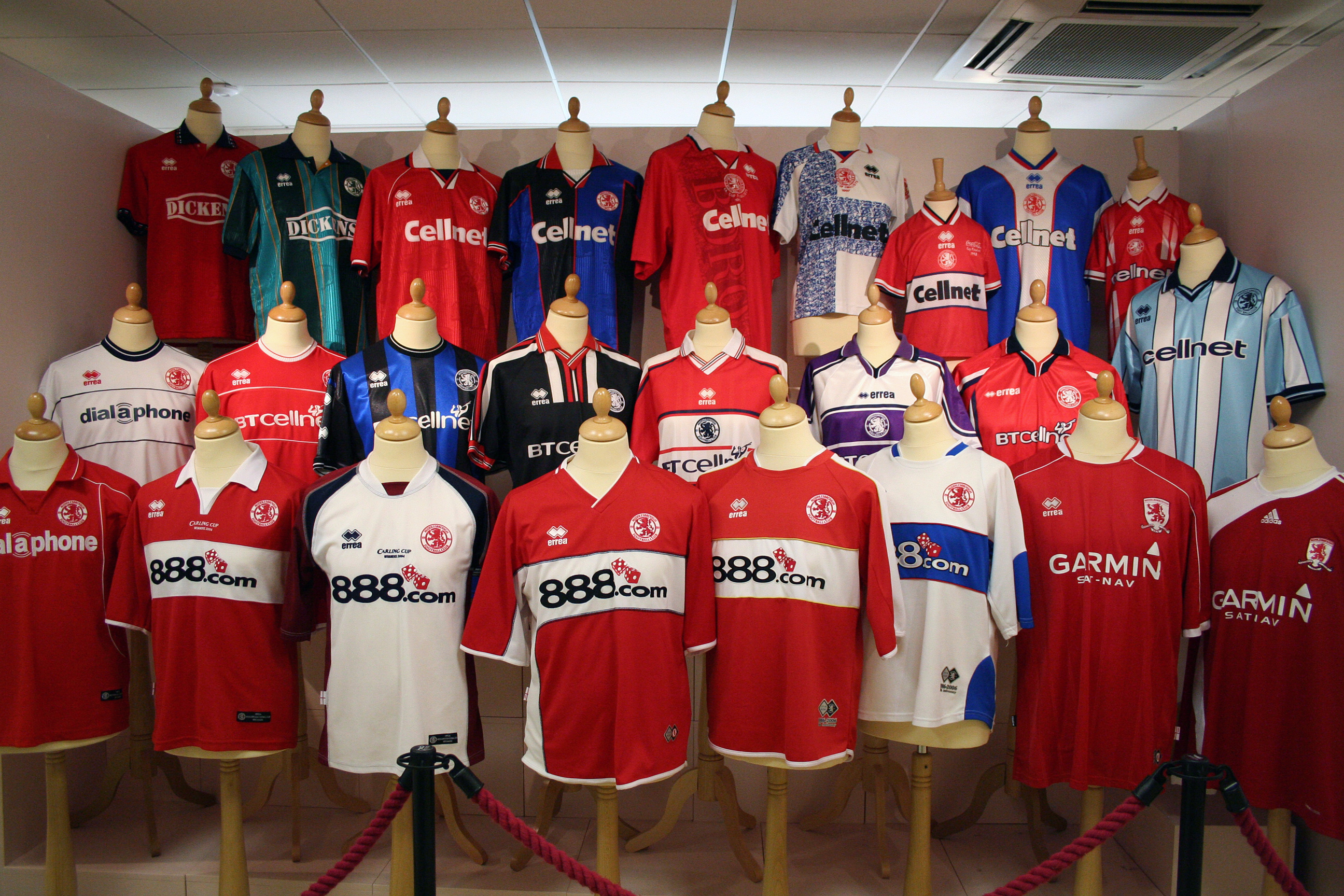
Middlesbrough shirts, 1994–2010

Middlesbrough's first sponsor in 1980 was Datsun Cleveland on a two-year deal. Further two-year deals continued until Dickens was the sponsor for the 1994–95 season only. From 1995 to 2002, the club was sponsored by mobile phone service Cellnet, followed by two years with mobile retailer Dial-a-Phone. Online casino 888.com (2004–07) and satellite navigation company Garmin (2007–2010) followed. In 2010–11, the club had several temporary sponsors including pawnbrokers Ramsdens, who then became permanent sponsors and signed a five-year deal in 2013. At its end, 32Red became the sponsors. Early in Ramsdens' sponsorship in March 2011, the company ceded its advertising space to Marie Curie Cancer Care for two games.

Italian manufacturers Erreà made Middlesbrough's kits from 1994 to 2009, when the role was taken up by Adidas, who had previously made the kits from 1979 to 1983. Danish company Hummel, which had made the kits from 1984 to 1987 during the club's winding up and rebirth, secured the contract again in 2018. Erreà returned in 2022. British company Castore have manufactured Middlesbrough's kits since 2025.

Period	Kit manufacturer	Shirt sponsor
1976–1977	Bukta	None
1977–1980	Adidas	None
1980–1982	Adidas	Datsun Cleveland
1982–1984	Adidas	McLean Homes
1984–1986	Hummel	Camerons
1986–1987	Hummel	Dickens
1987–1988	Skill	Dickens
1988–1990	Skill	Heritage Hampers
1990–1992	Skill	Evening Gazette
1992–1994	Admiral	ICI
1994–1995	Erreà	Dickens
1995–2002	Erreà	BT Cellnet
2002–2004	Erreà	Dial-a-Phone
2004–2007	Erreà	888.com
2007–2009	Erreà	Garmin
2009–2010	Adidas	Garmin
2010–2017	Adidas	Ramsdens
2017–2018	Adidas	Ramsdens Currency
2018–2022	Hummel	32Red
2022–2025	Erreà	Unibet
2025–2025	Castore	Unibet
2026-	Castore	Midnite

== Stadiums ==
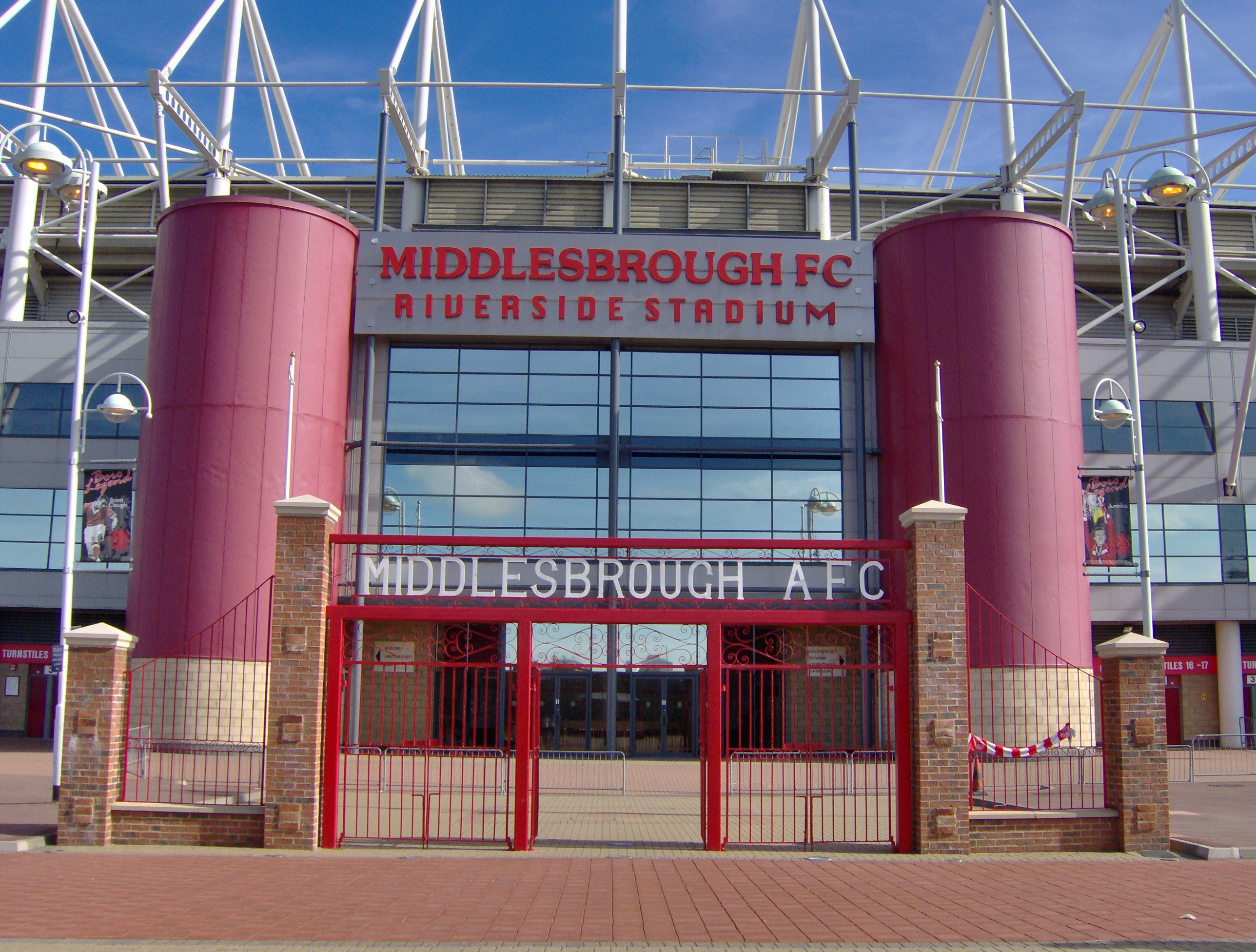
The Riverside Stadium in 2006, with the old gates to Ayresome Park in the foreground

After formation in 1876, and with the club still amateurs, Middlesbrough's first two years of football were played at Albert Park in Middlesbrough. After seeing the damage being caused by players and supporters, the Park Committee ordered the club to find an alternate venue. The club moved to Breckon Hill, behind the former Middlesbrough College longlands site, after agreeing to rent the land from its owner. However, two years later in 1880, the owner increased the rent and the club decided to move. They moved into the Linthorpe Road ground in 1882, home at the time of Middlesbrough Cricket Club. The cricket club departed in 1893–94 to move to the Breckon Hill field, and Middlesbrough Football Club became sole users of the ground.

With the club's growing size, and entry to the Football League, they had to move to a new ground in 1903, Ayresome Park. It was designed by Archibald Leitch and would be the club's home for the next 92 years, having also been chosen as one of the stadia for the 1966 FIFA World Cup. Following the Taylor Report in 1990, the ground either needed modernising or the club needed a new stadium. The club decided on the latter, and moved out at the end of the 1994–95 season. Ayresome Park was used as a training ground during 1995–96, before it was demolished in 1997 and a housing estate built in its place. Since the 1990s, the club trains at a £7 million complex at Rockliffe Park, in Hurworth, on the outskirts of Darlington.

The Riverside Stadium, named by the supporters of the club after a vote, became the club's home in 1995. It was the first stadium to be built in line with the Taylor Report's recommendations on all-seater stadiums for clubs in the top two divisions of the English football league system. It was originally a 30,000-seater stadium, constructed at a cost of £16 million, before it was expanded in 1998 to a capacity of 35,100 for an extra £5 million. The current capacity of the Riverside Stadium is 33,746 due to updates to the stadium, including the movement of the away section and the addition of a large screen.

Since then, several reorganisations of the Riverside Stadium have taken place. At the start of the 2013–14 season, away fans were moved from behind the goal in the South stand to the South East corner, while home fans were situated behind both goals to help create a better atmosphere inside the stadium. A giant TV screen was also installed at the back of the South-East corner, replacing the older style scoreboards attached to the North and South stand roofs. For the start of the 2016–17 season (and a return to the Premier League), the club had to improve the stadium's broadcasting facilities and floodlighting in order to meet Premier League requirements. The club also took this opportunity to move the main camera gantry to the back of the East stand, so that it faced the main West stand. As of the 2016–17 season, the stadium capacity is 33,746 due to the updates undertaken when the club was last in the Premier League.

== Supporters ==
Middlesbrough's average historic attendance is the 16th highest of all the clubs in England and Wales.

Traditionally, supporters come from Middlesbrough itself and towns in the immediate area. As of May 2001, Middlesbrough had one of the highest proportions in Britain of locally-born season ticket holders at 80%, and one of the highest proportions of female fans at 20%. A survey at the start of the 2007–08 season found Middlesbrough supporters were the seventh-loudest set of fans in the Premier League. Middlesbrough Official Supporters Club, which features its own team in the local football league, has links with supporters' clubs across the globe. The largest supporters' clubs include the Official Supporters' Club, the Middlesbrough Disabled Supporters' Association, Yarm Reds, Red Faction and Middlesbrough Supporters South.

For Middlesbrough supporters, their main rivals are Newcastle United (with whom they contest the Tyne–Tees derby), followed by Sunderland (with whom they contest the Tees–Wear derby), and also, according to a planetfootball.com's 2004 survey, Leeds United.

The nickname Smoggies was first used as a derogatory term by opposing supporters; it relates to the industrial air pollution – smog – that used to hang over the town, but it was later used by Middlesbrough fans in a somewhat self-deprecating manner, before finally being adopted as a badge of pride by supporters of the club. An example of this can be seen on the banners carried to away games stating "Smoggies on Tour". Middlesbrough fans received praise from UEFA Chief Executive Lars-Christer Olsson after their behaviour during the 2005–06 UEFA Cup campaign. He commented that:

You have the satisfaction of knowing that, although your team did not win the game, your supporters present in Eindhoven proved to the world that football fans can turn a match into a friendly, violence-free celebration.

Middlesbrough fans also received praise from Cleveland Police for their behaviour in previous rounds, particularly in the light of aggravation prior to and during the match at Roma.

== Media relations ==
Middlesbrough was the first football club in the world to launch its own TV channel – Boro TV. The first broadcasts were tied to the club's first ever major cup final appearance in 1997, a full year ahead of Manchester United's MUTV, which still claims to be the first in the world. The channel was the brainchild of then NTL marketing director, Peter Wilcock. The programme became synonymous with former Middlesbrough player Bernie Slaven and radio commentator Alastair Brownlee. Its programmes were not live initially but were pre-recorded and hosted by Dave Roberts.

In August 2001, Boro TV claimed another first when it became the first English football club to broadcast time-delayed full-match footage of their league games on its own channel. Boro TV ran through NTL cable television until July 2005. The club then began to show match highlights through a subscription-based scheme on its official website.

Middlesbrough's official matchday programme, Redsquare, was Programme Monthly's 2006–07 Programme of the Year. There are numerous other fanzines available, most notably Fly Me to the Moon, formed in September 1988 following Bruce Rioch's quote to Tony Mowbray, stating "If I had to go to the moon I'd want him by my side". In 2025, it became the football fanzine with the most issues, overtaking previous record holders Oatcake from Stoke, which stopped printing in 2019.

== Community ==
Middlesbrough Football Club in the Community (MFCIC) was founded in 1996 by club chairman Steve Gibson and is one of the largest community-based football schemes in the United Kingdom. It is run separately from the football club, but receives support from both the club in terms of providing players, staff, stadium facilities and PR for articles in the matchday programme and other publications, as well as support from other local organisations. In 2012, MFCIC was relaunched as MFC Foundation. The Foundation aims to use the club's profile to deliver sport, health, education and inclusion projects in vulnerable and disadvantaged communities across Teesside. Since 1996, the Foundation has delivered 20,000 qualifications, engaged over 500,000 people and invested £25 million in local communities to tackle inequality and disadvantage.

Since 2002, the club and MFCIC have also run the Middlesbrough Enterprise Academy, a scheme which helps local children. In March 2008, plans were announced by the Premier League to roll out the scheme nationally amongst all Premier League clubs.

It was announced in December 2007 that Middlesbrough football club had carried out more community work during 2006–07 than any other Premier League club, rising from second place the previous year, with the club making 318 appearances – almost twice the Premier League average of 162. They were in the top two for community appearances again in 2007–08, with 374 – a 17% increase on the previous season.

Middlesbrough's mascot is Roary the Lion. The club runs Roary's Children's Charity Fund, which purchases items for local children's charities.

In 2009, steel producer Corus Group announced the possibility that it would mothball its Teesside plant after a consortium of steel magnates walked away from a 10-year deal. Middlesbrough Football Club helped with the "Save Our Steel" campaign through various methods. Chairman Steve Gibson said:

"Middlesbrough Football Club exists for the community, for the people of Teesside—and the closure of the steel plants threatens to rip the heart out of our community. We cannot stand by and allow that to happen. We want the steelworkers and their families to know that we are behind them and will help their campaign in any way we can ... We like to think that the football club is the flagship of Teesside. Well this is our town and these are our people and we have to do what we can to help them."

=== European Football ===
Middlesbrough in Europe
Season	Competition	Round	Country	Club	Home	Away	Aggregate
2004–05	UEFA Cup	First round	(Czech Republic)	Baník Ostrava	3–0	1–1	4–1
2004–05	UEFA Cup	Group E	(Greece)	Egaleo	—N/a	0–1	1st
2004–05	UEFA Cup	Group E	(Italy)	Lazio	2–0	—N/a	1st
2004–05	UEFA Cup	Group E	(Spain)	Villarreal	—N/a	0–2	1st
2004–05	UEFA Cup	Group E	(Serbia)	Partizan Belgrade	3–0	—N/a	1st
2004–05	UEFA Cup	Round of 32	(Austria)	GAK	2–1	2–2	4–3
2004–05	UEFA Cup	Round of 16	(Portugal)	Sporting CP	2–3	0–1	2–4
2005–06	UEFA Cup	First round	(Greece)	Skoda Xanthi	2–0	0–0	2–0
2005–06	UEFA Cup	Group D	(Switzerland)	Grasshoppers Zürich	—N/a	0–1	1st
2005–06	UEFA Cup	Group D	(Ukraine)	Dnipro Dnipropetrovsk	3–0	—N/a	1st
2005–06	UEFA Cup	Group D	(Netherlands)	AZ Alkmaar	—N/a	0–0	1st
2005–06	UEFA Cup	Group D	(Bulgaria)	Litex Lovech	2–0	—N/a	1st
2005–06	UEFA Cup	Round of 32	(Germany)	Stuttgart	0–1	2–1	2–2a
2005–06	UEFA Cup	Round of 16	(Italy)	Roma	1–0	1–2	2–2a
2005–06	UEFA Cup	Quarter-final	(Switzerland)	Basel	4–1	0–2	4–3
2005–06	UEFA Cup	Semi-final	(Romania)	Steaua Bucharest	4–2	0–1	4–3
2005–06	UEFA Cup	Final	(Spain)	Sevilla	0–4		

== Non-playing staff ==
As of 24 October 2022

=== Corporate hierarchy ===
Position	Name
Chairman	Steve Gibson
Chief Executive	Neil Bausor
Head of Football	Kieran Scott
Club Secretary	Karen Nelson

=== Coaching staff ===
Position	Name
Head coach	(Sweden) Kim Hellberg
Assistant head coach	(Sweden) David Selini (England) Adi Viveash (Sweden) Anes Mravac
Goalkeeping coach	(Sweden) Linus Kandolin
Individual development coach	(England) Grant Leadbitter
Fitness coach	(England) Nick Allamby
Performance analyst	(England) Jack Riley
Performance analyst	(England) Nathan Kirby
Performance analyst	(England) Owen Forster
Head physiotherapist	(England) Adam Reed
Chief medical officer	(England) Rob Tatham
Physician	(England) Dr. Bryan English
Sports scientist	(England) Frankie Hunter
Kit man	(England) Peter Darke

=== Academy coaching staff ===
Position	Name
Academy Manager	(England) Craig Liddle
Head of Player Pathway and Development	(Uruguay) Leo Percovich
Professional Development Phase Coach (U21s)	(England) Mark Tinkler
Professional Development Phase Coach (U18s)	(England) James Marwood
Academy Goalkeeping Coach	(England) Chris Pennock
Head of Academy Recruitment	(England) Martin Carter
Head of Education and Welfare	(England) Barry Dawson

=== Managerial history ===
The following are all the full-time Middlesbrough managers since the club turned professional in 1899.

Dates	Manager(s)
1900–1905	Jack Robson
1905–1906	Alex Mackie
1906–1909	Andy Aitken
1909–1910	John Gunter
1910–1911	Andy Walker
1911–1919	Tom McIntosh
1920–1923	Jimmy Howie
1923–1926	Herbert Bamlett
1927–1934	Peter McWilliam
1934–1944	Wilf Gillow
1944–1952	David Jack
1952–1954	Walter Rowley
1954–1963	Bob Dennison
1963–1966	Raich Carter
1966–1973	Stan Anderson
1973–1977	Jack Charlton
1977–1981	John Neal
1981–1982	Bobby Murdoch

Dates	Manager(s)
1982–1984	Malcolm Allison
1984	Jack Charlton
1984–1986	Willie Maddren
1986–1990	Bruce Rioch
1990–1991	Colin Todd
1991–1994	Lennie Lawrence
1994–2001	Bryan Robson
2000–2001	Terry Venables
2001–2006	Steve McClaren
2006–2009	Gareth Southgate
2009–2010	Gordon Strachan
2010–2013	Tony Mowbray
2013–2017	Aitor Karanka
2017	Garry Monk
2017–2019	Tony Pulis
2019–2020	Jonathan Woodgate
2020–2021	Neil Warnock
2021–2022	Chris Wilder

Dates	Manager(s)
2022–2025	Michael Carrick
2025	Rob Edwards
2025–	Kim Hellberg

== Players ==
=== Current squad ===
As of 31 October 2026

Note: Flags indicate national team as defined under FIFA eligibility rules; some limited exceptions apply. Players may hold more than one non-FIFA nationality.

No.	Pos.	Nation	Player
1	GK	CZE	Radek Vítek
2	DF	ENG	Callum Brittain
3	DF	ENG	Sam Byram
4	DF	ENG	Ashley Phillips
5	DF	CAN	Alfie Jones
6	MF	USA	Sebastian Berhalter
7	FW	ENG	Will Lankshear
8	MF	AUS	Riley McGree
9	FW	SCO	Tommy Conway
10	MF	USA	Aidan Morris
11	FW	ENG	Amario Cozier-Duberry (on loan from Brighton & Hove Albion)
12	DF	ENG	Luke Ayling (captain)
13	FW	SVK	David Strelec
14	MF	ENG	Myles Peart-Harris

No.	Pos.	Nation	Player
16	MF	ECU	Jeremy Sarmiento
17	DF	USA	Max Arfsten
18	MF	SCO	Connor Barron (on loan from Rangers)
19	MF	ENG	Leo Castledine
21	MF	USA	Rokas Pukštas
22	FW	SCO	Kyle Joseph
25	DF	ENG	George Edmundson
28	MF	ENG	Law McCabe
29	DF	FRA	Adilson Malanda
30	DF	BRA	Neto Borges
31	GK	ENG	Sol Brynn
33	GK	SCO	Jon McLaughlin
44	MF	ENG	Cruz Ibeh

==== Out on loan ====
Note: Flags indicate national team as defined under FIFA eligibility rules; some limited exceptions apply. Players may hold more than one non-FIFA nationality.

No.	Pos.	Nation	Player
15	DF	ENG	Finley Munroe (at Blackpool until 30 June 2027)
27	FW	CUW	Sontje Hansen (at Gaziantep until 30 June 2027)

No.	Pos.	Nation	Player
—	FW	NED	Delano Burgzorg (at Preston North End until 30 June 2027)
40	MF	ENG	Fin Cartwright (at Grimsby Town until 30 June 2027)

==== Other players under contract ====
Note: Flags indicate national team as defined under FIFA eligibility rules; some limited exceptions apply. Players may hold more than one non-FIFA nationality.

No. / Pos. / Nation / Player; — / MF / ENG / Micah Hamilton	No. / Pos. / Nation / Player; 24 / DF / SLE / Alex Bangura

== Notable players ==
=== Middlesbrough Legends ===
These 10 players were voted for by fans as part of a campaign with the Evening Gazette.

- (England) George Camsell
- (England) George Hardwick
- (England) Wilf Mannion
- (England) Brian Clough
- (England) John Hickton
- (England) Willie Maddren
- (England) Tony Mowbray
- (Republic of Ireland) Bernie Slaven
- (Brazil) Juninho
- (England) Gareth Southgate

=== Top appearances ===
These players made more than 430 appearances during their time at the club. The number in brackets indicates the number of appearances in all competitions.

- Tim Williamson (602)
- Gordon Jones (532)
- John Hickton (499)
- John Craggs (487)
- Jim Platt (481)
- George Camsell (453)
- Jacky Carr (449)
- Mark Schwarzer (446)
- David Armstrong (431)

=== Top goalscorers ===
These players scored more than 140 goals during their time with the club. The number in brackets indicates the number of goals scored in all competitions.

- George Camsell (345)
- George Elliott (213)
- Brian Clough (204)
- John Hickton (193)
- Micky Fenton (162)
- Bernie Slaven (146)
- Alan Peacock (141)

=== Player of the Year award winners ===
Year	Winner
1966	(England) Gordon Jones
1968	(England) Dickie Rooks
1969	(England) Dickie Rooks
1970	(England) George Smith
1971	(England) Gordon Jones
1972	(Northern Ireland) Jim Platt and (England) Stuart Boam
1973	(England) Willie Maddren
1974	(Scotland) Graeme Souness
1978	(England) Stan Cummins
1979	(England) Stuart Boam
1980	(England) David Armstrong
1981	(Northern Ireland) Jim Platt
1985	(England) Tony Mowbray
1986	(England) Tony Mowbray
1991	(England) Ian Baird

Year	Winner
1997	(Brazil) Juninho
1999	(Colombia) Hámilton Ricard
2001	(Croatia) Alen Bokšić
2002	(England) Gareth Southgate
2004	(Netherlands) George Boateng
2005	(England) Stewart Downing
2006	(Nigeria) Yakubu
2007	(England) Jonathan Woodgate
2008	(England) David Wheater
2009	(Turkey) Tuncay Şanlı
2010	(Scotland) Barry Robson
2011	(England) Joe Bennett
2012	(Scotland) Barry Robson
2013	(England) Jason Steele
2014	(England) George Friend

Year	Winner
2015	(England) George Friend
2016	(England) Adam Clayton
2017	(England) Ben Gibson
2018	(Spain) Adama Traoré
2019	(Republic of Ireland) Darren Randolph
2020	(England) Jonny Howson
2021	(Northern Ireland) Paddy McNair
2022	(England) Jonny Howson
2023	(England) Chuba Akpom
2024	(Netherlands) Rav van den Berg
2025	(England) Hayden Hackney

=== Football League 100 Legends ===
The Football League 100 Legends is a list of 100 legendary football players produced by The Football League in 1998, to celebrate the 100th season of League football.

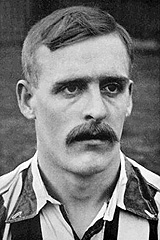
Alf Common, the first player to command a £1000 transfer fee

- Alf Common
- George Camsell
- Steve Bloomer
- Wilf Mannion
- George Hardwick
- Nobby Stiles
- Graeme Souness
- Bryan Robson
- Paul Gascoigne

=== English Football Hall of Fame ===
The English Football Hall of Fame is housed at the National Football Museum in Manchester, England. The Hall aims to celebrate and highlight the achievements of top English footballers and footballers who have played in England. These players appeared for or managed Middlesbrough at some point in their careers.

- Brian Clough (2002 inductee)
- Paul Gascoigne (2002 inductee)
- Bryan Robson (2002 inductee)
- Viv Anderson (2004 inductee)
- Wilf Mannion (2004 inductee)
- Jack Charlton (2005 inductee)
- Graeme Souness (2007 inductee)
- Nobby Stiles (2007 inductee)
- Terry Venables (2007 inductee)
- Steve Bloomer (2008 inductee)
- Malcolm Allison (2009 inductee)
- Raich Carter (2013 inductee)
- Gordon Strachan (2016 inductee)
- Paul Ince (2021 inductee)

=== Scottish Football Hall of Fame ===
The following former Middlesbrough players and managers have been inducted into the Scottish Football Hall of Fame.

- Bobby Murdoch (2004 inductee)
- Graeme Souness (2004 inductee)
- Gordon Strachan (2007 inductee)

== Honours ==
League
Competition	Position	Season
Second Division / First Division / Championship (level 2)	Champions	1926–27, 1928–29, 1973–74, 1994–95
Second Division / First Division / Championship (level 2)	Runners-up	1991–92, 1997–98, 2015–16
Second Division / First Division / Championship (level 2)	Play-off winners	1988
Third Division (level 3)	Runners-up	1966–67, 1986–87
Northern League	Champions	1893–94, 1894–95, 1896–97

Cup
Type	Competition	Position	Season
Domestic	FA Cup	Runners-up	1996–97
Domestic	League Cup	Winners	2003–04
Domestic	League Cup	Runners-up	1996–97, 1997–98
Domestic	Full Members' Cup	Runners-up	1989–90
Domestic	North Riding Senior Cup	Winners	55 occasions since 1882
Continental	Anglo-Scottish Cup	Winners	1975–76
Continental	UEFA Cup	Runners-up	2005–06
International	Kirin Cup	Winners	1980

== Middlesbrough Women ==
Middlesbrough Women is the women's team affiliated to Middlesbrough. Founded as Cleveland Spartans in 1976, they became officially affiliated with the men's team in 2023, and currently play in the FA Women's National League North, the third level of English women's football.
