= Linthorpe Road =

Former cricket and football grounds

- Interactive map of Linthorpe Road
- Location: Middlesbrough, England
- Coordinates: 54.5689°N 1.2407°W
- Surface: Grass

Construction
- Opened: 1875
- Closed: 1903

Tenants
- Middlesbrough Cricket Club (1875–1893); Middlesbrough F.C. (1880–1903)

Linthorpe Road was a cricket and football ground in Middlesbrough in England. It was the home ground of Middlesbrough Cricket Club and Middlesbrough F.C.

== History ==
Linthorpe Road opened as a cricket ground in 1875, and football began to be played there in 1880, with the football pitch at the northern end of the ground. In July 1882 a first class match was played at the ground, with Yorkshire lost to the touring Australians. Middlesbrough Cricket Club left the ground in 1893.

Middlesbrough F.C. were elected to the Second Division of the English Football League in 1899. By this time the ground consisted of a grandstand on the northern touchline and narrow seated stands around the remainder of the pitch. The first Football League game was played at Linthorpe Road on 9 September 1899, with Middlesbrough losing 3–1 to Small Heath in front of 10,000 spectators.

The ground's record League attendance was set on 6 September 1902 when 17,000 saw Middlesbrough defeat Everton 1–0. The club left Linthorpe Road at the end of the 1902–03 season to move to Ayresome Park, taking the grandstand with them. The final League match played at the ground was on 25 April 1903, with 8,000 spectators watching a 1–1 draw with Stoke. The site was initially used to build St Aidan's church, but was later converted into housing.
