= Phil Horrocks-Taylor =

British Lions & England international rugby union player (1934–2021)

- Born: John Philip Horrocks-Taylor; 27 October 1934 Halifax, England
- Died: 11 February 2021 (aged 86) Middlesbrough, England
- Height: 1.83 m (6 ft 0 in)
- Weight: 86 kg (13 st 8 lb)
- Occupation: Engineer

Rugby union career
- Position: Fly Half
Senior career
Years	Team	Apps	(Points)
1956–1957	Cambridge University		
1958–1963	Leicester Tigers	92	
1963–1969	Middlesbrough		
International career
Years	Team	Apps	(Points)
1955–1966	Yorkshire	57	
1958–1964	England	9	(3)
1959	Lions	1	(0)

John Philip Horrocks-Taylor (27 October 1934 – 11 February 2021) was a rugby union fly half who played for Leicester Tigers between 1958 and 1963; he represented England 9 times between 1958 and 1964 and was selected for the 1959 British Lions tour to Australia and New Zealand where he played in the third test. He was a Cambridge University blue in Rugby for 1956 and 1957.

== Career ==
Horrocks-Taylor came up to St John's College, Cambridge in 1955 after playing in his native Yorkshire for Halifax and completing his national service at Catterick.

Horrocks-Taylor joined Leicester in 1958, making his debut on 27 September against Harlequins at Twickenham, Horrocks-Taylor was described as a "brilliant half-back, who is the most talked young player about in rugger circles".

Horrocks-Taylor left Leicester in September 1963 after receiving a job offer in Middlesbrough that was "too good to turn down", and joined the local club, in the 1964 Five Nations Championship he played his final two matches for England and became the first current Middlesbrough RUFC player to represent England.

He also played for Wasps and Halifax.
