= Acklam Park =

Rugby and cricket ground in Middlesbrough, England

- Interactive map of Acklam Park
- Full name: Acklam Park
- Address: Green Lane, TS5 7SL; Middlesbrough
- Location: Middlesbrough, North Yorkshire, England
- Coordinates: 54.551207°N 1.252760°W
- Capacity: 5,000 (159 seated)
- Surface: Grass

Construction
- Groundbreaking: 1928
- Built: 1928–1929
- Opened: 1929
- Renovated: 2008
- Years active: 1929–1940, 1945–present
- Cost: £1,200 (1929)

Tenants
- Middlesbrough RUFC (1929–present); Middlesbrough Cricket Club (1932–present); Yorkshire County Cricket Club (1956–1996)

Website
- www.middlesbroughcricket.co.uk www.bororugby.co.uk

Acklam Park is a rugby union and cricket ground located in Middlesbrough, North Yorkshire, England. Initially opened in 1929, the venue has hosted games of Middlesbrough RUFC since the ground's opening in 1929, as well as Middlesbrough Cricket Club since 1932. Yorkshire County Cricket Club also played a number of first class matches at Acklam Park between 1956 and 1996. With a capacity of 5,000, the ground initially cost £1,200 in construction cost upon its opening.

== History ==
Middlesbrough RUFC purchased a 12-acre field in 1928 for a fee of £1,200. The club paid 13 shillings, club members paid £500 and £800 was loaned from the Rugby Football Union. Middlesbrough played their first games on their present ground in 1929, having played at several previous venues. Due to the cost of the ground, the club officials began selling oats and wheat from the field in order to pay off their loan from the Rugby Football Union. The name Acklam Park was adopted in 1930, and the following year a stand and pavilion was built, funded as a result of 12 interest-free loans of £100 each from local businessmen, the majority of whom refused to take repayment of their loan.

In 1932, Middlesbrough Cricket Club became joint-owners of Acklam Park, soon attracting the interest from Yorkshire County Cricket Club, who had a ground history as tenants of the ground between 1956 and 1996. With play halted during the Second World War, the ground closed in 1940, before being re-opened in 1945.

In 2008, a new clubhouse was opened at Acklam Park, which includes a bar, a café, a gymnasium, a function room and lounge. Improved changing rooms were also inserted, leading out to an exit to the main cricket and rugby pitches. A new stand was constructed, with seats being placed in front of the changing rooms exit and café door exit. Despite seats, supporters are eligible to stand and watch the rugby and cricket teams play. The stand uses bench seating, though plans are in place to have plastic seats added into the stand. In August 2018, the rugby club added dug-outs to the first team pitch.

== Location ==
The ground sits on Green Lane, and is located near Acklam Shops and Green Lane Primary School, with a range of pubs near the ground. On the exterior of the ground, a number of housing estates are on the boundaries of the clubhouse.

== Other events ==
Annually, a summer beer festival is held at the ground, which has raised much money over the years. They also host an annual firework display.

On 27 August 2016, Middlesbrough Cricket Club hosted the first fundraiser event, Party in Acklam Park!, with live music and entertainment. The purpose of this event was to raise more money for the cricket club and for new developments in the youth teams. Party in Acklam Park went from strength-to-strength in the subsequent years, welcoming more than 3,000 guests each year, and celebrates its 10th anniversary in 2026, welcoming back some of the most popular acts from the previous decade.
