= Laurie Gloag =

Scotland international rugby union player

- Born: Lawrence Gjers Gloag; 30 October 1925 Stokesley, England
- Died: 28 February 1984 (aged 58) Northallerton, England
- University: Trinity College, Cambridge

Rugby union career
- Position: Centre
Amateur team(s)
Years	Team	Apps	(Points)
1948	Middlesbrough		
1948-50	Cambridge University		
1951-52	Kelso		
Provincial / State sides
Years	Team	Apps	(Points)
1949	Scotland Possibles		
1949	Scotland Probables		
1951-52	South of Scotland District		
International career
Years	Team	Apps	(Points)
1949	Scotland	4	(3)

Laurie Gloag (30 October 1925 – 28 February 1984) was a Scotland international rugby union player.

== Rugby Union career ==
=== Amateur career ===
Laurie Gloag, along with his brother Ian, went to Oundle School.

He played for Middlesbrough.

He played rugby union for Cambridge University, when he went to university at Trinity College.

He joined Kelso in 1951. He was nominated for the vice-captaincy in early 1952 but declined as he expected to leave Kelso in October that year.

=== Provincial career ===
He started for the Scotland Possibles side in January 1949, but after a good performance in the first half was promoted to the Scotland Probables side in the second half.

When he joined Kelso, he then turned out for South of Scotland District.

=== International career ===
He was capped for Scotland four times, all in 1949. He scored one try, against Wales.

== Cricket career ==
He played cricket for Kelso Cricket club.

== Family ==
His father was Ernest Richardson Gloag and his mother Olga Gjers Gjers.

They had sons Laurie and Ian Sadler Gloag. Ian also played rugby union for Middlesbrough, Cambridge University, as well as the Royal Signals and Yorkshire.

Laurie Gloag married Anne Clinkard in June 1962.
