= Middlesbrough Cricket Club =

Cricket club in North Yorkshire, England

Middlesbrough Cricket Club plays at Acklam Park in Middlesbrough, North Yorkshire, England. The club currently plays in the North Yorkshire and South Durham Cricket League (NYSD).

It currently has multiple teams: 1st XI, 2nd XI, 3rd XI, under 17, under 15, under 13, under 12, under 11, under 9 and the Maidens (an all girl side).

== Teams ==
It currently has multiple teams: 1st XI, 2nd XI, 3rd XI, under 17, under 15, under 13, under 12, under 11, under 9 and the Maidens (an all girl side). In 2025, the club expanded to include an all-girls cricket team, the Middlesbrough Maidens, which played its inaugural season in 2026.

== History & Facilities ==
Established in 1855, the club opened Linthorpe Road as a purpose built cricket ground for the club in 1875. Middlesbrough Football Club (MFC) was founded by members of the club a year after the move. MFC began playing at the grounds in 1880 as joint tenants.

It was a founding member of the North Yorkshire and South Durham Cricket League (NYSD) in 1893. The club left Linthorpe Road the same year, leaving only MFC as its tenants.

After Linthorpe Road, the club moved to Breckon Hill Road (in the Grove Hill area of town), and further moved to Acklam Park in 1932. The Club became Acklam Park's co-owners, with Middlesbrough RUFC as pre-existing tenets.

In December 2025, the club completed a major upgrade to its training infrastructure, installing a state-of-the-art four-lane enclosed all-weather net facility at Acklam Park to replace the older, unserviceable nets. The project was funded through grants from the Enovert Community Trust and the ECB County Grants Fund. To honour the historic 1876 connection between the cricket club and Middlesbrough Football Club, Boro goalkeeper Sol Brynn officially opened the new facility in the spring of 2026 at an event supported by the MFC Foundation.

== Honours ==
- 1st XI has won the NYSD premier division 12 times; 1911, 1957, 1959, 1960, 1961, 1970, 1993, 1994, 2007, 2008, 2010 and 2022.

== Notable players ==
- Brenton Parchment, 2003-4
- Nick Kwant, 2019

== Club Officials ==
President - Laurence Davison

Chairman - Mal Bruton
