= Middlesbrough RUFC =

Rugby union club in North Yorkshire, England

Middlesbrough
- Full name: Middlesbrough Rugby Union Football Club
- Union: Yorkshire RFU
- Nickname(s): The Lions, Boro
- Founded: 1872; 154 years ago
- Location: Middlesbrough, England
- Ground: Acklam Park (Capacity: 5,000 (159 seats))
- Chairman: Phil Tilson
- President: Dave Storey
- Director of Rugby: Steve Todd
- Coach: Ollie Hodgson
- League: Regional 2 North
- 2024–25: 1st (promoted to Regional 1 North East)

Official website
- www.bororugby.co.uk

Middlesbrough Rugby Union Football Club is an English rugby union team. One of two clubs of the area of Middlesbrough, the club runs five senior sides and ten junior teams. Three of the senior leagues now play in the league structure, following a decision in 2026 to allow non-1st XVs teams into the leagues. The 1st XV plays in Regional 1 North East, the 2nd XV participates in Counties 2 Durham & Northumberland South, and the 3rd XV participates in Counties 3 Durham & Northumberland South.

The initial club was formed in 1872, but it was not until 1892 when the current name was introduced. The club plays at Acklam Park, having moved there in 1930, and currently have a ground-share with Middlesbrough Cricket Club.

== History ==
Number of teams as of the 2017–18 season
Senior	Junior	Mini
1st XV	Teesside Colts	U12s
Wasps	Teesside United U16s	U11s
A Team	U15s	U10s
Lions	U14s	U9s
	U13s	U8s
		U7s

The first recorded club match took place on 16 November 1872 against Northumberland, playing at Newcastle. The final results score was Northumberland 28–0 Middlesbrough. The earliest Derby game known was Middlesbrough 10–0 Darlington, which took place at Breckon Hill road on Grove Hill on 15 February 1873. Between 1873 and 1879 is unknown, with the debut Middlesbrough team later defunct. Following this, a Middlesbrough Rovers team was formed. Teesside Wanderers was founded in 1881. Until 1892, Middlesbrough continued to support their 2 clubs until that year came when the Rovers lost their ground. Middlesbrough RUFC was then officially formed.

The club had previously played at several different grounds, before eventually settling down at a new home on Green Lane, Acklam Park, in 1929; the official ground name was not decided until 1930. In 1933, the local Middlesbrough Cricket Club joined the ground, becoming joint-owners. For the 2012–13 season in the North 1 East, the club finished in 11th place, one place above the relegation zone, with 45 points. They were later relegated to Yorkshire 1 the following season, in 12th place, with just 50 points being achieved. In the 2014–15 season, Middlesbrough played in Yorkshire 1. They played two consecutive seasons in Durham/Northumberland 1, when they were transferred to that league, before being transferred back to Yorkshire 1.

In 2015, Barker and Stonehouse, Twitter, Charles Clinkard and Carlsberg agreed to sponsor Acklam Park, as well as the club. Facing the first team pitch, there is an all-seated stand, though it is bench seating that is used rather than seats, as it was cheaper at the time. However, there are seats facing the cricket pitch, which is connected to the right side of the clubhouse, with players walking out of the changing rooms onto the pitch forward. In 2017, the cricket club allowed the youth teams of the rugby club to use their pitch, due to the rugby club needing to use the main ground, rather than the main junior ground, Tollesby Road, as the grass was not cut. After the grass at Tollesby was cut, the youth teams from the under-7s to under-12s moved back to Tollesby. There are currently plans to have their stand converted into an all-seater stand, instead of using bench seating, there will be plastic seats used.

The 2019–20 season was a major blow for the club: they were transferred back to Durham/Northumberland 1 due to geographical reasons and a major cut in player numbers within their youth system saw their status as a club deteriorate. Lack of players led to their "Colts" side merge with Stockton to become "Teesside Colts" and their under-16s squad merge with Acklam to become "Teesside United".

== Current squad ==
Role	Name
Openside flanker	Rohan Brown
Second row	Billy Campbell
Tight-head prop	Martin Quinn
Tight-head prop	Myles Colvin
loose-head prop	Matthew Helm
Blindside flanker	Ali Lang
Number 8	Oli Hodgson
Second Row	Aaron Marron
Hooker	Joe Sawdon
Second row	Fin Magowan
Second row	Toby Tremlett
Hooker/ Loose-Head	Jack Cook

Role	Name
Loose-Head/Tight-head prop	Josh Lynas
Inside centre	Pete Homan
Outside centre	Jack McPhillips
Right wing	Brendan Hill
Full back	Matthew Marsay
Inside centre/Full back/Wing	Aedan Moloney
Right wing	Sean Maloney
Inside centre	Andrew Micklewright
Full back	Adam Nolson
Scrum half	Sam Seymour
Fly half	Matthew Todd
Right wing	Ben Wood
Inside centre	Michael Thornburn
Scrum half	Connor Foley

== Past seasons ==
Club past performances
Season	League	Finishing place	Promotion or relegation
2024–25	Regional 2 North	1st	Promoted to Regional 1 North East
2023–24	Regional 2 North	3rd	
2022–23	Regional 2 North	5th	
2021–22	Yorkshire Division One	1st	Promoted to Regional 2 North
2020–21	Yorkshire Division One		
2019–20	Yorkshire Division One		
2018–19	Yorkshire Division One	8th	
2017–18	Yorkshire Division One	3rd	
2016–17	Durham/Northumberland 1	5th	Transferred to Yorkshire Division One
2015–16	Durham/Northumberland 1	2nd	
2014–15	Yorkshire Division One	4th	Transferred to Durham/Northumberland 1
2013–14	North 1 East	12th	Relegated to Yorkshire Division One
2012–13	North 1 East	11th	
2011–12	North 1 East	4th	
2010–11	National League 3 North	12th	Relegated to North 1 East

== Notable events ==
- In 1947, the first team shattered the 1931–32 season record of 19 wins and 409 points, by notching 22 victories from 29 games and totalling 516 points with only 128 against.
- In 1955, numbered shirts were introduced for the first team squad.
- In 1960, the first post-war tour took place with matches against Chester, Birkenhead Park and the District XV.
- From 1962 until 1963, there was a 12-week lay-off because of snow.
- In 1963, Phil Horrocks-Taylor joined the club; a Cambridge blue and England international player, he was the first international player from Middlesbrough.

== Honours ==
- Yorkshire Cup champions: 1976, 2023
- North 2 (east v west) play-off winner 2003–24
- North Division 2 East champions 2006–07
- Counties 1 Yorkshire champions: 2021–22
- Regional 2 North champions: 2024–25

== Notable former players ==
=== Men ===
The following players have represented their country at full international level.

==== Scotland ====
- (Scotland) Laurie Gloag

==== England ====
The following former Middlesbrough players have represented England at full international level.

- (England) Phil Horrocks-Taylor
- (England) Alan Old
- (England) Rob Andrew
- (England) Rory Underwood
