= Wilf Mannion =

English footballer (1918–2000)

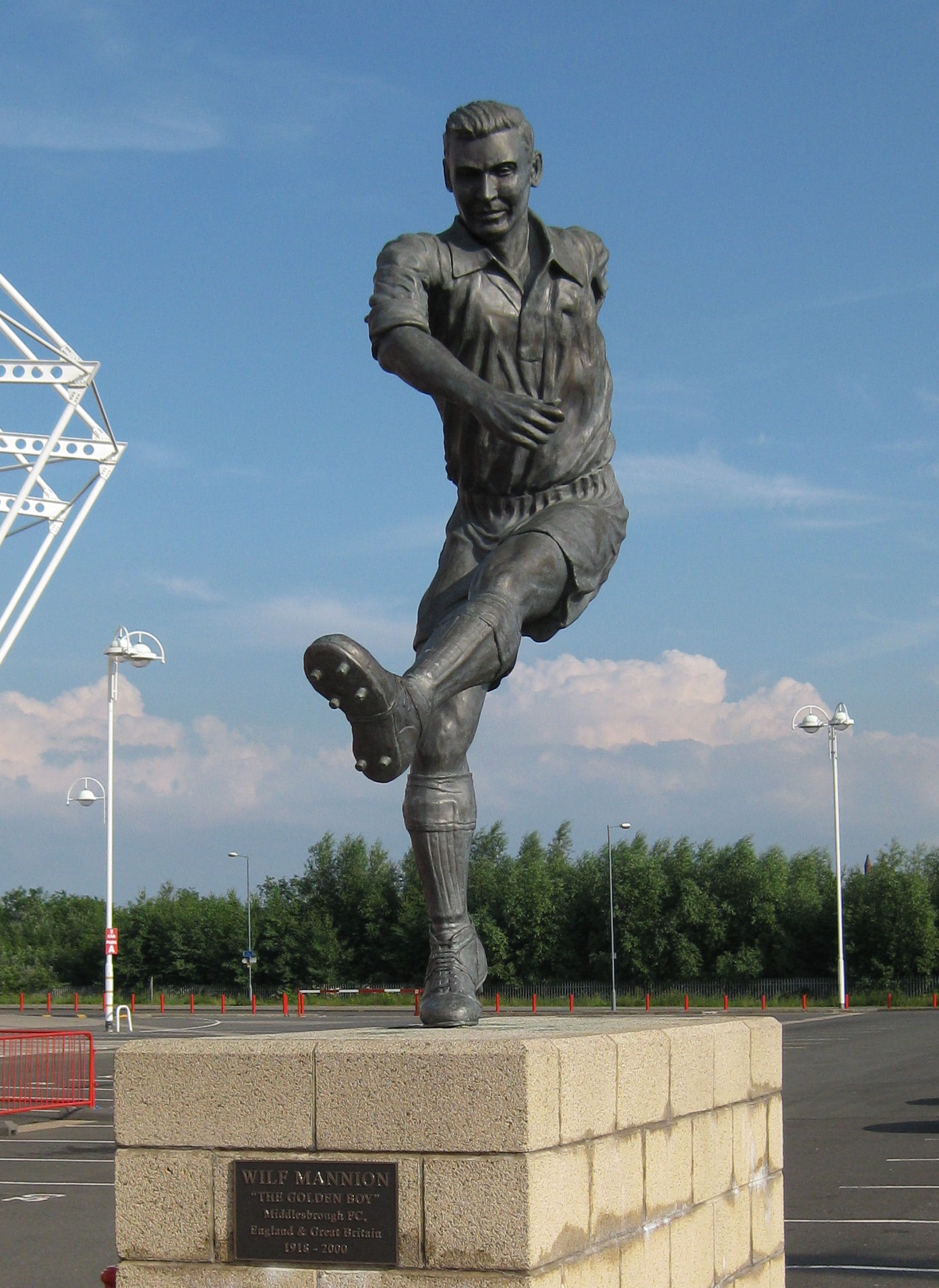
- Statue outside the Riverside Stadium of Middlesbrough F.C.

Personal information
- Full name: Wilfred James Mannion
- Date of birth: 16 May 1918
- Place of birth: South Bank, Middlesbrough, England
- Date of death: 14 April 2000 (aged 81)
- Place of death: Teesside, England
- Position: Inside forward

Senior career*
Years	Team	Apps	(Gls)
1936–1954	Middlesbrough	341	(99)
1954–1956	Hull City	16	(1)
1956	Poole Town		
1956–1958	Cambridge United		
1960–62	Earlestown (player/manager)		

International career
1939–1946	→ England wartime team	4	(0)
1948	England B	1	(0)
1946–1951	England	26	(11)
1947	United Kingdom	1	(2)
- * Club domestic league appearances and goals

Wilfrid James Mannion (16 May 1918 – 14 April 2000) was an English professional footballer who played as an inside forward, making over 350 senior appearances for Middlesbrough. He also played international football for England. With his blonde hair, he was nicknamed "The Golden Boy".

== Early life ==
Mannion was born on 16 May 1918 in South Bank, the son of Irish immigrants Tommy and Mary Mannion, and one of ten children.

== Club career ==
=== Middlesbrough ===
Mannion joined his local team Middlesbrough F.C. in 1936 and went on to make 341 Football League appearances for them, scoring 99 goals in the First and Second Divisions, over the next 18 years. However, his career was disrupted by World War II. He scored 110 goals in all competitions for Middlesbrough.

Mannion fought in France and Italy during World War II, and in Italy his commanding officer was the England cricketer Hedley Verity.

At the end of the 1947–48 season he wanted a transfer, but Middlesbrough refused. In protest he did not play for them for much of the following season but he eventually backed down and started playing for Middlesbrough again.

=== Later career ===
After initially retiring as a player in 1954, Mannion subsequently joined Hull City. However, the Football League suspended him for articles he had written, He then played non-league football with Cambridge United.

== International career ==
Mannion was capped on 26 occasions by the England national team between 1946 and 1951, and his final appearance came on 3 October 1951. He was a member of the England squad for the 1950 FIFA World Cup. Along with Middlesbrough and England teammate George Hardwick, he was also part of the Great Britain football team that beat the Rest of Europe 6–1 in 1947.

He remains the only Middlesbrough player to score for England at the World Cup.

== After football ==
Mannion was eventually awarded a testimonial match by Middlesbrough in 1983, alongside former Boro and England colleague George Hardwick.

Mannion died on 14 April 2000 at the age of 81. After his death, Middlesbrough FC erected a statue of Mannion outside the Riverside Stadium.

In 2004, he was inducted into the English Football Hall of Fame at the National Football Museum.
