= Riverside Stadium =

Football stadium in Middlesbrough, North Yorkshire, England

- Riverside
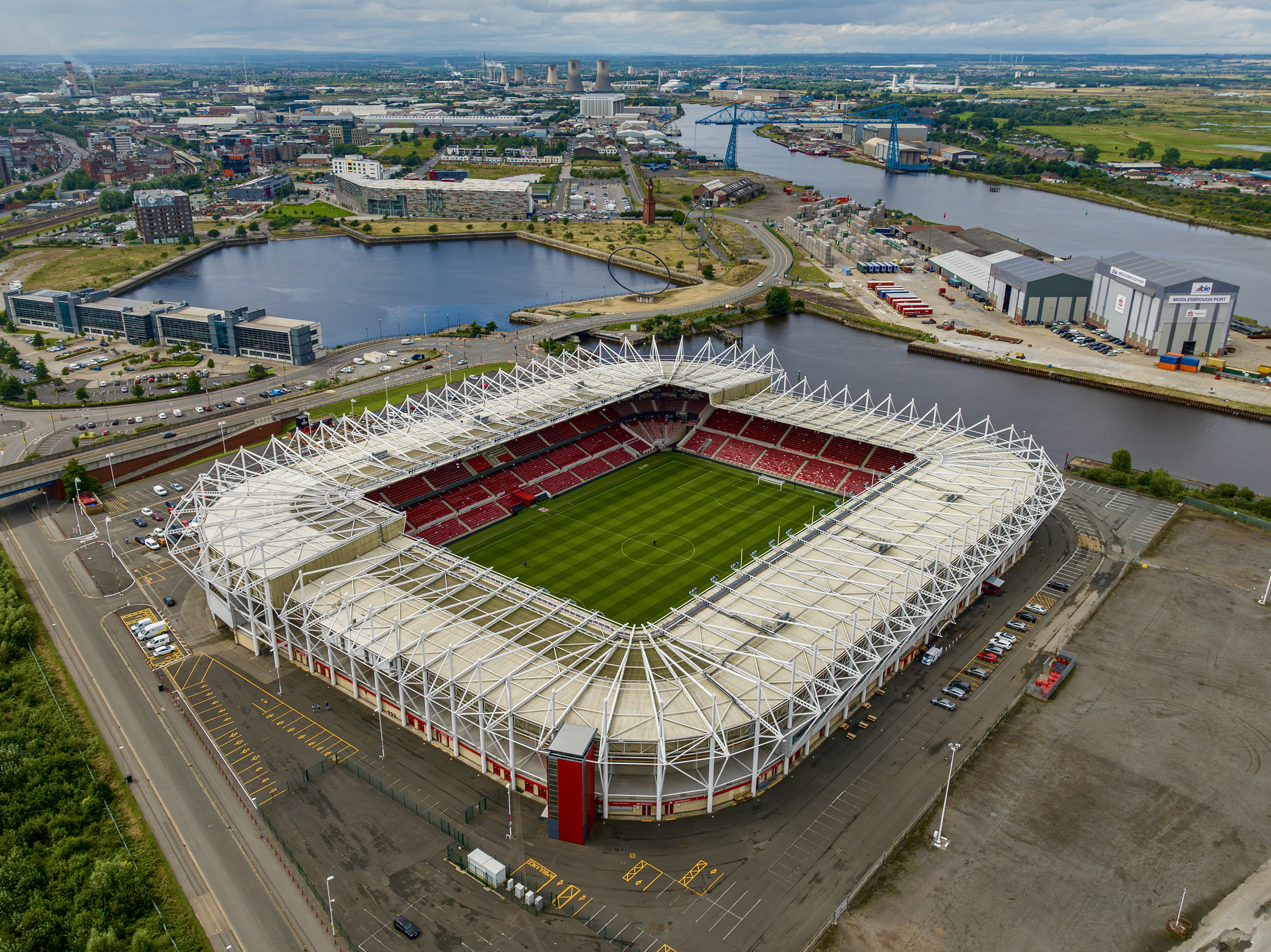
- UEFA
- Interactive map of Riverside Stadium
- Full name: Riverside Stadium
- Former names: Cellnet Riverside Stadium (1995–1999); BT Cellnet Riverside Stadium (1999–2002); Captain James Cook Stadium (2019)
- Location: Middlesbrough, England
- Coordinates: 54°34′42″N 1°13′1″W
- Owner: Middlesbrough
- Operator: Middlesbrough
- Capacity: 33,746
- Surface: Grass
- Record attendance: Middlesbrough: 34,836 (vs Norwich City, 28 December 2004); Overall: 35,000 (England v Slovakia, 11 June 2003)
- Field size: 115 x 75 yards (105 x 69 m)
- Public transit: Middlesbrough

Construction
- Built: 1994–1995
- Opened: 26 August 1995
- Renovated: 1998
- Cost: £16 million
- Structural engineer: Arup
- General contractor: Taylor Woodrow

Tenants
- Middlesbrough (1995–present); Middlesbrough Women (2023–present)

The Riverside Stadium is a football stadium in Middlesbrough, England, which has been the home of Middlesbrough since its opening in 1995. It has an all-seated capacity of 33,746, although provisional planning permission is in place to expand to 42,000 if required.

Middlesbrough Women became affiliated with the Middlesbrough men's team in May 2023 and now play selected matches at the Riverside Stadium.

== History ==
The stadium was built to replace Ayresome Park following the publication of the Taylor Report, which required all top division football stadiums to be all-seater. After the report was delivered in January 1990, Middlesbrough needed an all-seater stadium by August 1994 but were unable to expand Ayresome Park outwards owing to its location in a residential area, and expanding the stadium upwards would have limited the club to a capacity of around 20,000 seats – the club wanted a considerably larger capacity. The decision was taken in 1993 by club officials to build a new stadium; Teesside Development Corporation offered them the Middlehaven site by the River Tees for development.

The new 30,000 seater stadium was constructed by Taylor Woodrow Construction for £16 million, taking approximately nine months to complete after work began in the autumn of 1994. The name of the stadium was chosen by the club's fans, following a vote during the final game at Ayresome Park. The other choices available were Middlehaven Stadium, Erimus Stadium and Teesside Stadium. When it opened, the name was amended to Cellnet Riverside Stadium (and then BT Cellnet Riverside Stadium) as part of a £3 million sponsorship deal with Cellnet, but this deal ended after the 2001–02 season.

The first game was played against Chelsea in front of a 28,286 crowd (the highest home attendance in fourteen years) on 26 August 1995. Middlesbrough won the game 2–0, with Craig Hignett taking the honour of scoring the first ever goal at the stadium, Jan Åge Fjørtoft scoring the second. Their first season at their new stadium was also their first back in the Premier League following promotion after two seasons away.

In their second season at the Riverside Stadium, Middlesbrough were runners-up in both of the domestic cups, but a points deduction in the league meant that they were relegated from the Premier League.

In 1998 – when Middlesbrough were promoted back to the Premier League at the first attempt – the capacity was increased by 5,000 by filling in the north and south-west corners at a cost of £5 million. This expansion gave the stadium a 35,100 capacity, with average attendances during the late 1990s and into the 2000s frequently well over 30,000 compared to around 10,000 during most of the club’s final few seasons at Ayresome Park.

Modernisation of the stadium since then has led to the seating being reorganised on several occasions with the stadium having a capacity of 34,000 at the start of the 2017–18 season. The club have planning permission to extend the stadium by another 7,000 if demand made it necessary, which would bring its capacity up to approximately 42,000.

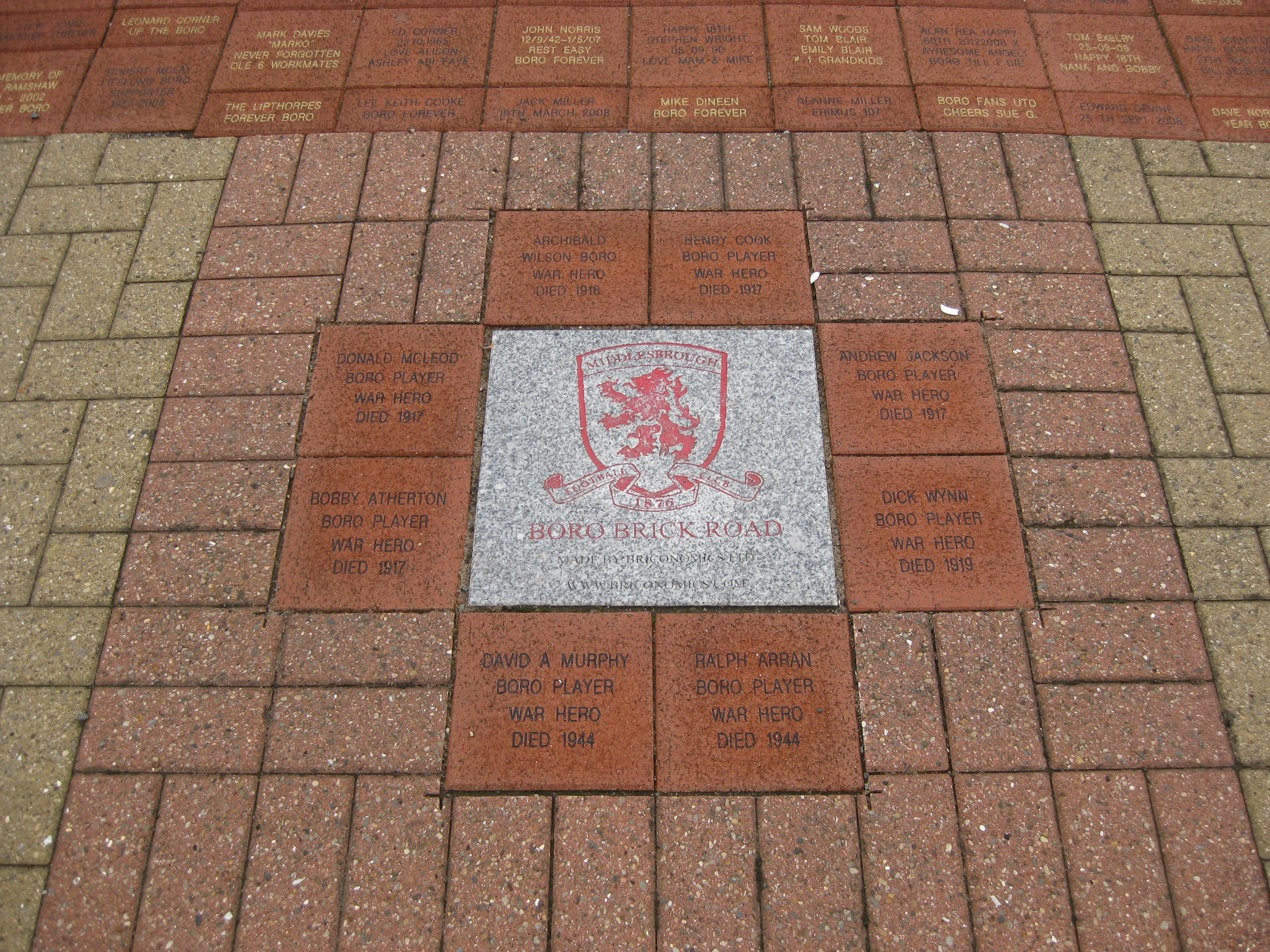
War heroes in the Borobrick Road

In 2005, the old Ayresome Park gates, which had been famously locked when the club went into liquidation in 1986, were erected outside the Riverside Stadium as a reminder of the past. Another addition has been statues of former players George Hardwick, Wilf Mannion and George Camsell. The area in front of the Ayresome Park gates is the location of the "Borobrick Road", where fans could pay to have a message inscribed on a brick (often in memory of a deceased family member) to be added to the road. For Armistice Day 2008, a set of bricks commemorating eight Middlesbrough players who died in the two world wars was unveiled.

In July 2008, planning permission was granted by Middlesbrough Council to construct a wind turbine at the site of the stadium, standing 125 metres high and capable of generating three megawatts of electricity. The turbine is used to power the stadium, with the excess being sold to the National Grid.

On 24 April 2012, it was announced that the stadium would host the only public warm up match for the Great Britain Olympic football team before the London 2012 Olympic Games against Brazil. Football stars including Ryan Giggs, Craig Bellamy, Thiago Silva, Neymar, Lucas Moura and Hulk all featured in the match in which Brazil outclassed Great Britain, winning 2–0.

On 15 March 2013, it was announced that Conference National side Gateshead would stage a "home" game at the Riverside Stadium, after continual drainage problems at Gateshead International Stadium forced them to play their last twelve league games of the season at five different venues.

Following the club's promotion to the Premier League at the end of the 2015–16 season, the ground underwent a £5 million package of renovations designed to bring it up to the standards required of Premier League stadiums. Renovations included the installation of a large press box at the back of the East Stand, the construction of two permanent television studios at the back of the south-east corner, with associated access and TV compound on the stadium's exterior, an internal reorganisation of the West Stand reception, tunnel and changing room area, new floodlights and refurbished concourse areas including the addition of new kiosks and card and contactless payment methods. These changes resulted in a slightly reduced capacity of 33,746.

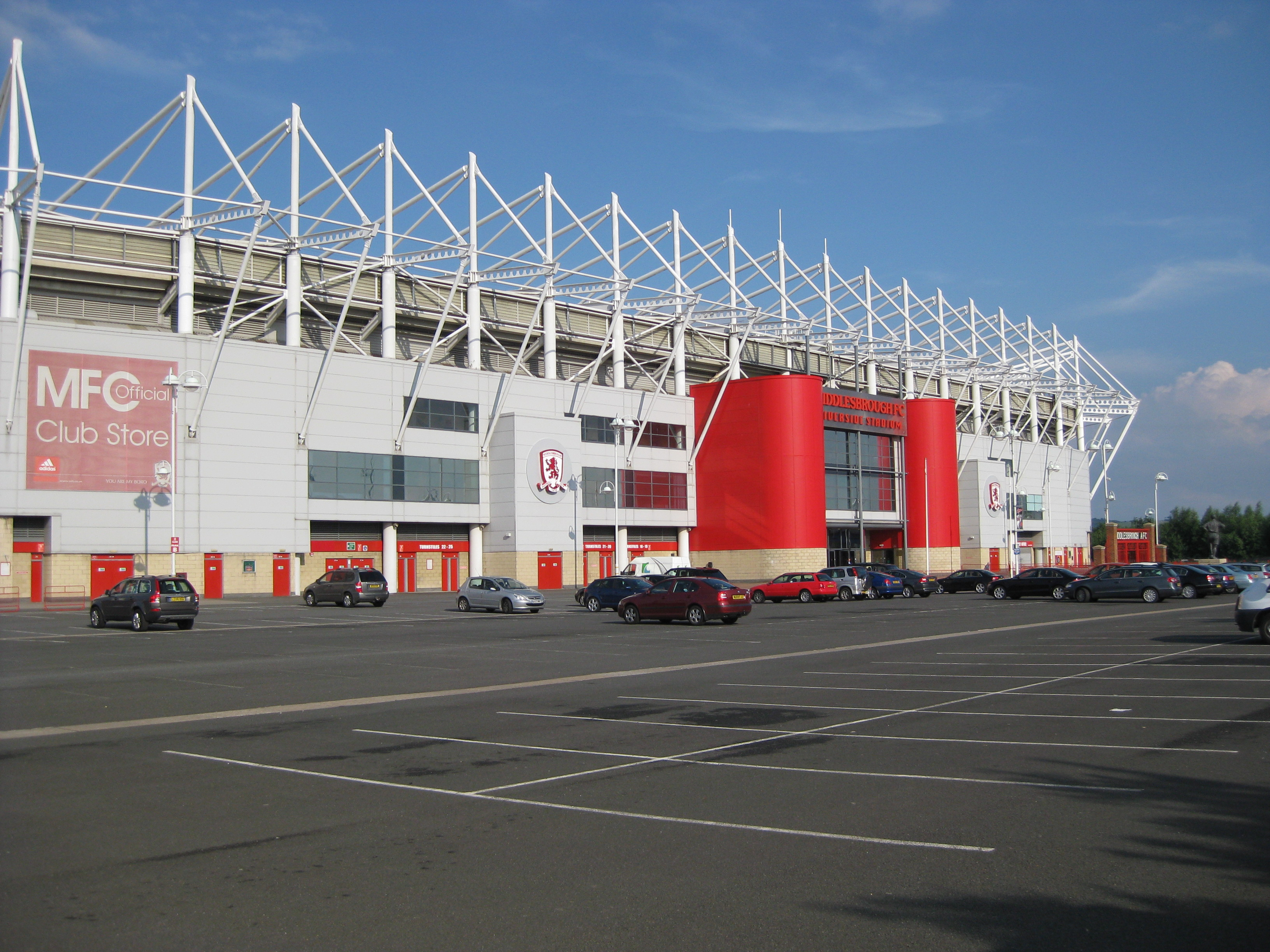
Exterior view

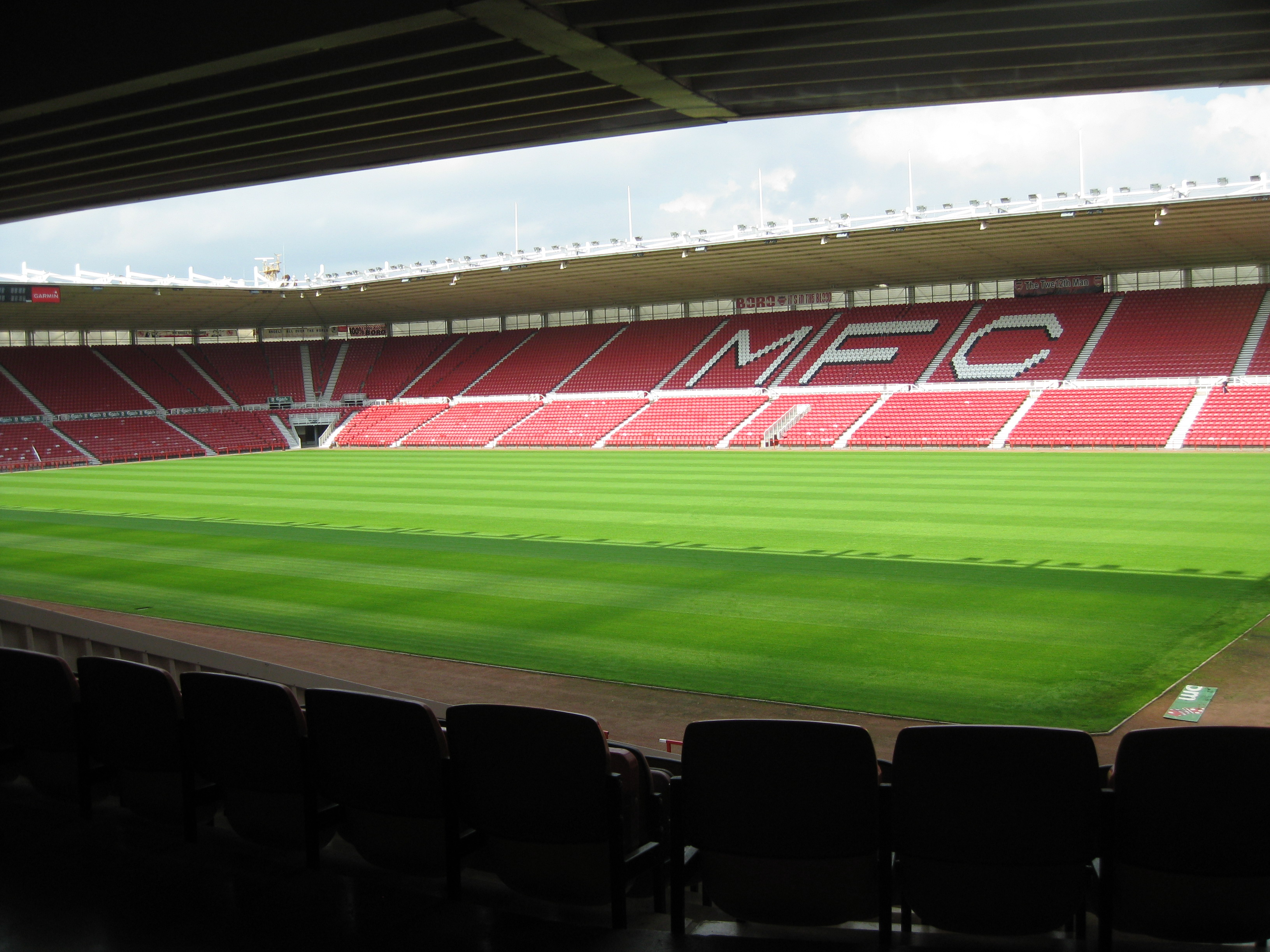
Interior view

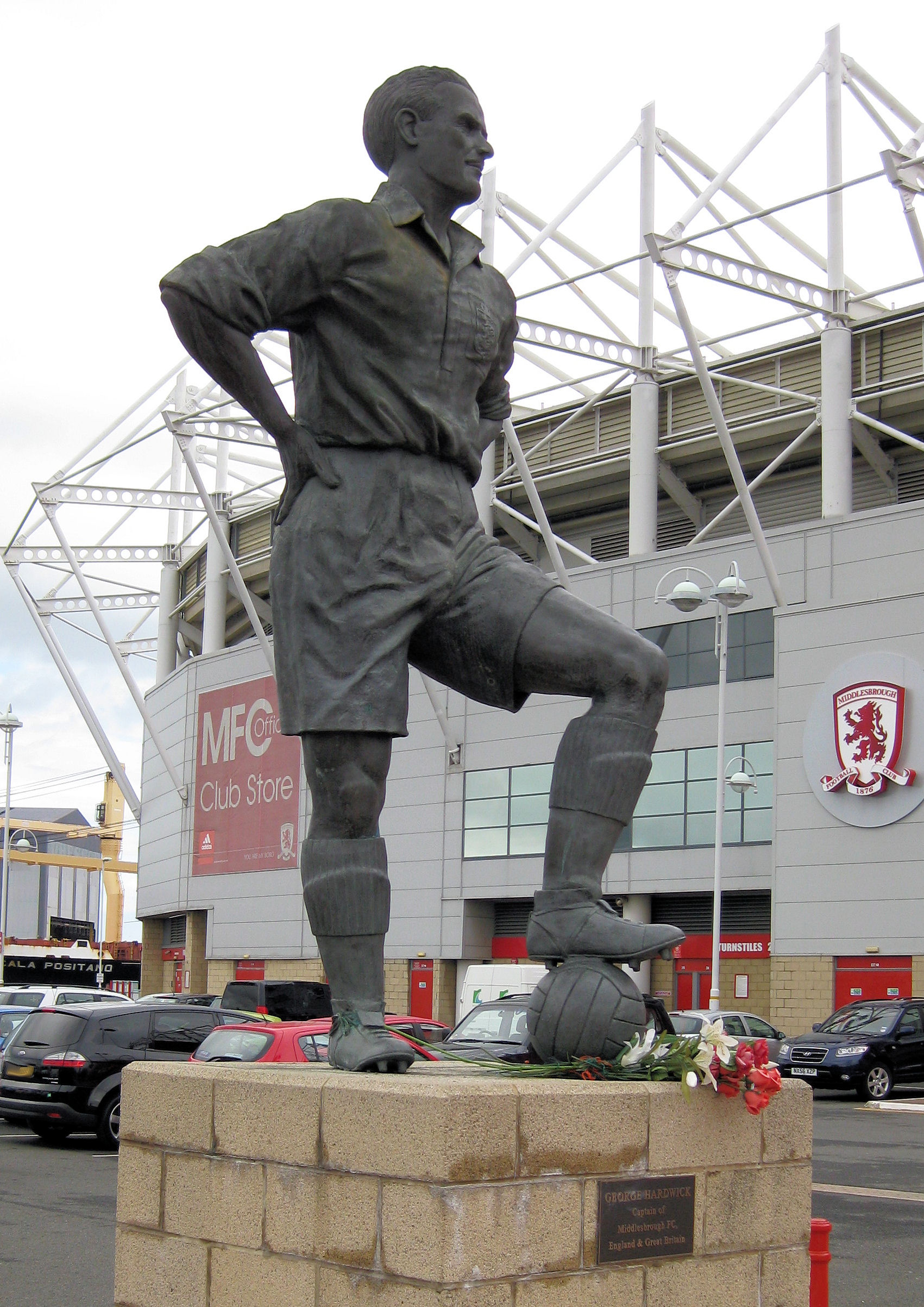
Statue of George Hardwick (1920–2004)

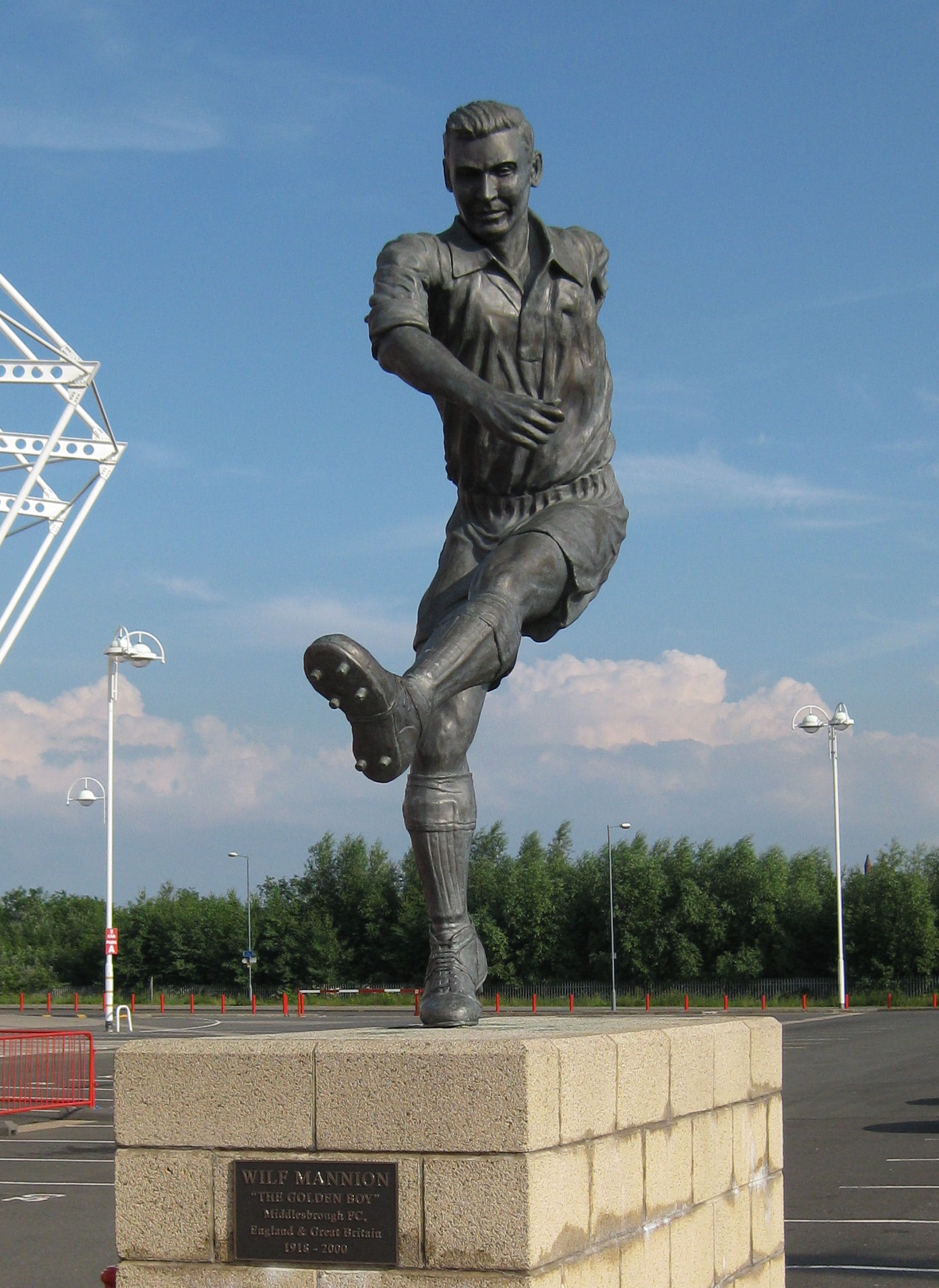
Statue of Wilf Mannion (1918–2000)

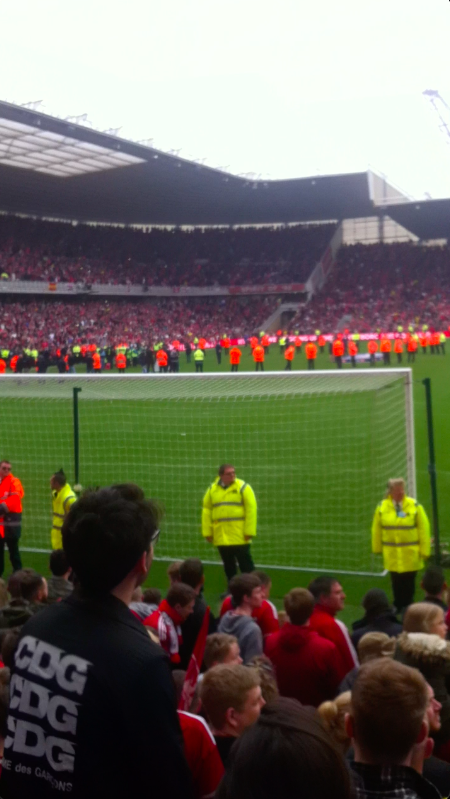
2015–16 promotion celebrations

== Stadium details ==
The stadium is fully enclosed with every seat offering an uninterrupted view of the pitch. The four main stands are commonly known as the North, East, West and South stands. The corners are referred to as the North-East, North-West, South-East and South-West corners. Concourses run around the entirety of the ground with kiosks serving food and drink.

The North Stand backs on to the River Tees.

The West Stand runs along the length of the pitch and is the stadium's largest stand. The stand contains a number of executive boxes along its length as well as restaurants etc. The stand houses the changing rooms, and the players' tunnel emerges from the middle of the stand. White seating in the top tier spells out the club's nickname "BORO".

The East Stand greets the players as they walk out the tunnel. The main television gantry was relocated to the top of the stand from the West Stand in 2016. White seating in the top tier of the stand spells out "MFC". The roof houses five flagpoles with various flags flying, usually representing the league and cup competitions the club are participating in, as well as a flag of the team crest. A new press box was installed at the back of this stand in preparation for the club's promotion back to the Premier League. The East Stand houses a family zone (North-East end) and also visiting supporters (South-East Corner). Prior the 2016–17 season, two permanent television studios were installed at the back of the South-East Corner, on either side of the existing giant TV screen. One effect of this was a slight reduction in overall capacity.

The South Stand previously housed visiting supporters (now relocated to the South-East corner), but since the 2013–14 season has housed home supporters. The stand houses the vocal Boro "ultras" group "Red Faction", who are known to organise tifos.

== Records and statistics ==
- Record Attendance (all teams): 35,000 England v Slovakia, 11 June 2003, (Euro 2004 qualifier)
- Record Attendance (Middlesbrough): 34,836 (vs Norwich City, 28 December 2004), (FA Premier League)

League attendances (pre 1998 extension)
Season	League	Position	High	Low	Average	Capacity (Note: All seats per safety certificate (including seats unavailable for sale due to segregation).)	% Full
1995–96	Premier League	12	30,011	27,882	29,283	30,000	98%
1996–97	Premier League	19	30,215	29,485	29,848	30,000	99%
1997–98	First Division	2	30,228	29,414	29,994	30,000	100%

League attendances (post 1998 extension)
Season	League	Position	High	Low	Average	Capacity (Note: All seats per safety certificate (including seats unavailable for sale due to segregation).)	% Full
1998–99	Premier League	9	34,687	33,387	34,386	35,100	98%
1999–00	Premier League	12	34,800	31,400	33,393	35,100	95%
2000–01	Premier League	14	34,696	27,965	30,747	35,100	88%
2001–02	Premier League	12	34,358	24,189	28,459	35,100	81%
2002–03	Premier League	11	34,814	27,443	31,025	35,100	88%
2003–04	Premier League	11	34,738	26,721	30,977	35,100	88%
2004–05	Premier League	7	34,836	29,603	32,012	35,100	91%
2005–06	Premier League	14	31,908	25,971	28,463	35,100	81%
2006–07	Premier League	12	33,308	23,638	27,730	35,100	79%
2007–08	Premier League	13	33,952	22,963	26,708	35,100	76%
2008–09	Premier League	19	33,767	24,020	28,429	34,988	81%
2009–10	Championship	11	27,342	14,038	19,948	34,988	57%
2010–11	Championship	12	23,550	13,712	16,269	34,988	46%
2011–12	Championship	7	27,794	14,366	17,558	34,988	50%
2012–13	Championship	16	28,229	13,683	16,794	34,988	48%
2013–14	Championship	12	23,679	12,793	15,748	34,742	45%
2014–15	Championship	4	33,381	14,970	19,562	34,742	56%
2015–16	Championship	2	33,806	19,966	24,627	34,742	71%
2016–17	Premier League	19	32,704	27,316	30,449	33,746	90%
2017–18	Championship	5	29,433	22,848	25,544	34,000	75%
2018–19	Championship	7	30,881	21,016	23,217	34,000	68%
2019–20	Championship	17	25,313	17,961	19,933 (Note: Due to the Covid-19 pandemic, the home games versus Swansea City, Queens Park Rangers, Bristol City and Cardiff City were played behind closed doors. Average calculated for the 19 matches for which attendance was permitted.)	34,000	59%
2020–21	Championship	10	1,000	1,000	1,000 (Note: Due to the Covid-19 pandemic, the entire season was played behind closed doors with the exception of the home game against Bournemouth on 19 September 2020, where a crowd of 1,000 was allowed as part of a pilot scheme targeting the return of supporters.)	34,000	3%
2021–22	Championship	7	29,832	17,931	21,825	34,000	64%
2022–23	Championship	4	32,187	22,124	26,012	34,000	77%
2023–24	Championship	8	31,716	23,545	26,905	34,000	79%
2024–25	Championship	10	32,147	22,177	25,416	34,000	75%

The above does not include attendances for cup competitions or play off matches.

== Other uses ==
=== International matches ===
==== Association football ====
Like its predecessor Ayresome Park, the Riverside Stadium has played host to international football. During the construction of the new Wembley Stadium, the England team toured the country, playing at varying grounds. The Riverside was chosen to host the Euro 2004 qualifying match against Slovakia on 11 June 2003. England won the match 2–1 with a brace from Michael Owen after Vladimír Janočko had put Slovakia ahead. The match is also notable for pitting Middlesbrough's England defender Gareth Southgate against their own Slovak striker at the time, Szilárd Németh. In April 2021, it was announced that the Riverside Stadium would host two England friendly matches, against Austria and Romania, in preparation for the Euro 2020 Championship.

In February 2022, the Riverside Stadium hosted two games of the Arnold Clark Cup, an invitational women's association football tournament featuring England, Canada, Germany and Spain.

Date		Result		Competition	Attendance
31 August 2000	England	6–1	Georgia	Under-21 Friendly	
4 September 2001	England	5–0	Albania	2002 UEFA European Under-21 Football Championship qualification	
11 June 2003	England	2–1	Slovakia	2004 UEFA European Football Championship qualification	35,000
7 August 2004	England	3–1	Ukraine	Under-21 Friendly	
29 March 2005	England	2–0	Azerbaijan	2006 UEFA European Under-21 Football Championship qualification	
29 February 2012	England	4–0	Belgium	2013 UEFA European Under-21 Football Championship qualification	
20 July 2012	Great Britain	0–0	Sweden	2012 London Olympic Women's Friendly	24,721
20 July 2012	Great Britain	0–2	Brazil	2012 London Olympic Men's Friendly	24,721
30 March 2015	England	3–2	Germany	Under-21 Friendly	30,178
6 October 2017	England	3–1	Scotland	2019 UEFA European Under-21 Championship qualification	20,126
5 October 2019	England	1–2	Brazil	International Friendly (women)	29,238
2 June 2021	England	1–0	Austria	International Friendly (men)	
6 June 2021	England	1–0	Romania	International Friendly (men)	
17 February 2022	Germany	1–1	Spain	2022 Arnold Clark Cup	249
17 February 2022	England	1–1	Canada	2022 Arnold Clark Cup	8,769

==== Rugby League ====
The Riverside Stadium was one of the venues for the 2021 Men's Rugby League World Cup, hosting the penultimate Group D match between Tonga and the Cook Islands. Tonga won 92–10 and thus qualified for the quarter-finals as group winners, whilst the Cook Islands were eliminated from the competition.

Date		Result		Competition	Attendance
30 October 2022	Tonga	92–10	Cook Islands	2021 Men's Rugby League World Cup	8,342

=== Concerts ===
On 1 June 2019, Take That performed at the Riverside Stadium in front of 32,000 fans, as part of their 30th Anniversary Tour. They were supported by Rick Astley, the first time a concert had been held at the stadium.

On 1 June 2022, The Killers, supported by the Manic Street Preachers, played at the stadium in front of 33,000 fans as part of the UK leg of their Imploding the Mirage Tour.

On 5 June 2023, the Arctic Monkeys, supported by The Hives and The Mysterines, played at the stadium in front of 32,000 fans.

Date	Artist(s)	Attendance
1 June 2019	Take That, Rick Astley,	32,000
1 June 2022	The Killers, Manic Street Preachers,	33,000
5 June 2023	Arctic Monkeys, The Hives, The Mysterines,	32,000
24 May 2024	Take That, Olly Murs,	32,000
8 June 2024	James Arthur, McFly, Lauran Hibberd,	

== Milestone matches ==
26 August 1995	(England) Middlesbrough	2–0	Chelsea (England)	1995–96 FA Premier League; First Match
15:00 BST	Hignett 39'; Fjørtoft 77'			Attendance: 28,286; Referee: Stephen Lodge

7 February 1996	(England) Middlesbrough	0–0	Wimbledon (England)	1995–96 FA Cup R4; First FA Cup Match
15:00 GMT				Attendance: 28,915; Referee: Roger Dilkes

11 June 2003	England	2–1	Slovakia	UEFA Euro 2004 qualifying Stadium Record Attendance (all teams)
20:00 BST				Attendance: 35,000

28 December 2004	(England) Middlesbrough	2–0	Norwich City (England)	2004–05 FA Premier League; Stadium Record Attendance (Middlesbrough)
15:00 GMT				Attendance: 34,836; Referee: Howard Webb

17 September 2023	(England) Middlesbrough	0–0	Stockport County (England)	2023–24 FA Women's National League Division One North; First Middlesbrough F.C. Women's Match
14:00 BST				Attendance: 2,177

13 April 2025	(England) Middlesbrough	7–0	Doncaster Rovers Belles (England)	2024–25 FA Women's National League Division One North; Stadium Record Attendance (Middlesbrough F.C. Women)
14:00 BST				Attendance: 4,083

== See also ==
- Development of stadiums in English football
- Lists of stadiums
