= Brenton Parchment =

Jamaican cricketer

Personal information
- Born: 24 June 1982 (age 44); St. Elizabeth, Jamaica
- Batting: Right-handed
- Bowling: Right-arm offbreak
- Role: Batsman

International information
- National side: West Indies
- Test debut: 10 January 2008 v South Africa
- Last Test: 22 May 2008 v Australia
- ODI debut: 4 December 2007 v Zimbabwe
- Last ODI: 3 February 2008 v South Africa
- Only T20I (cap 21): 16 December 2007 v South Africa

Domestic team information
- Years: Team
- 1999/00–2013: Jamaica

Career statistics
Competition	Test	ODI	T20I	FC
Matches	2	7	1	67
Runs scored	55	122	10	3,111
Batting average	13.75	17.42	10.00	26.58
100s/50s	0/0	0/0	0/0	4/13
Top score	20	48	10	168*
Balls bowled	0	0	0	247
Wickets	0	0	0	3
Bowling average	–	–	–	42.33
5 wickets in innings	0	0	0	0
10 wickets in match	0	0	0	0
Best bowling	–	–	–	2/1
Catches/stumpings	1/–	0/–	0/–	69/–
- Source: CricketArchive, 24 July 2021

Brenton Anthony Parchment (born 24 June 1982) is a Jamaican former professional cricketer. Born in St Elizabeth, he was the West Indies under-19 captain on the team's tour of England in 2001. This team was the only West Indies Under-19 team to beat England at home. Parchment made his full international debut in 2007 for the West Indies cricket team and played two Test matches, seven One Day Internationals and a single Twenty20 International in 2007 and 2008.

Parchment played first-class and List A cricket for Jamaica. As well as this, he plays as a professional for English cricket clubs. He was the professional cricketer for Middlesbrough Cricket Club in 2003–04. During his first season with them, they won the Cup. In 2005 he was the professional for Farnworth Cricket Club. He helped them to win both the League and Cup in the Bolton League, and to honour him they named the club's games room after him. In 2010 he played for Blackrod Cricket Club in the Bolton Association and broke the club's highest score record on his debut with 184 not out. He played in the Lancashire League at Haslingden Cricket Club in 2013 season and North County CC, playing in LCU Division 1.
