= The Oatcake =

Stoke City F.C. fan magazine

The Oatcake was a fanzine dedicated to the English football team Stoke City F.C.

It is named after a local delicacy: the North Staffordshire oatcake. The fanzine is well known for its cartoons featuring stereotypes both from within the city of Stoke-on-Trent and from the footballing world. 'The Oatcake' cost £2.50, and while the front cover shows the red colour of Stoke, it is generally black and white format. Inside there is satirical football humour, letters (from Stoke City fans), as well as match reports, and information about away games (where to park, drink etc.), and so on. It ran for over 30 years before publishing its 653rd and final issue for the opening EFL Championship game against Queens Park Rangers in August 2019. It was edited by Martin Smith.
