= George Hardwick =

English footballer, manager, and coach

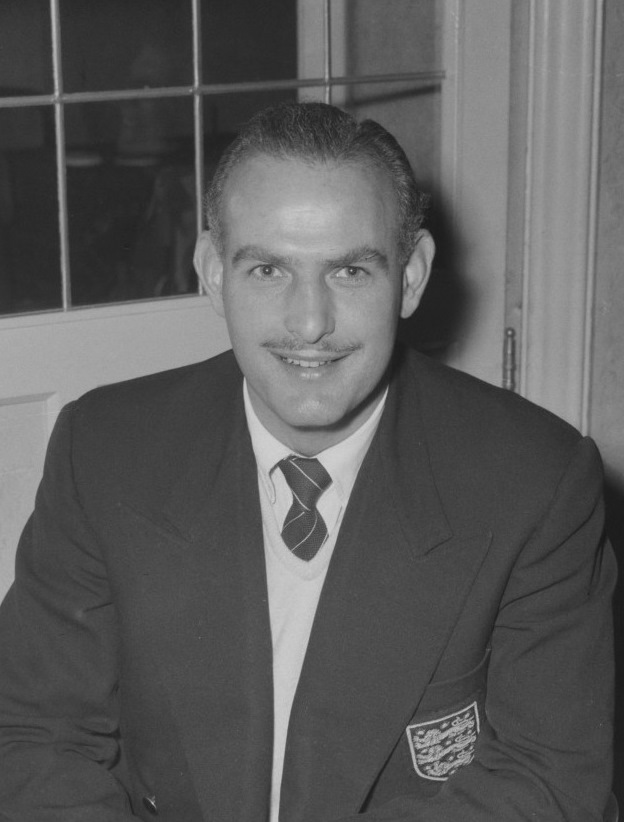
- Hardwick in 1956

Personal information
- Full name: George Francis Moutry Hardwick
- Date of birth: 2 February 1920
- Place of birth: Saltburn, England
- Date of death: 19 April 2004 (aged 84)
- Place of death: Stockton-on-Tees, England
- Position: Defender

Senior career*
Years	Team	Apps	(Gls)
1937–1950	Middlesbrough	143	(5)
1950–1956	Oldham Athletic	190	(14)
Total		333	(19)

International career
1946–1948	England	13	(0)

Managerial career
- 1950–1956: Oldham Athletic
- 1957: Netherlands
- 1957–1958: PSV Eindhoven
- 1964–1965: Sunderland
- 1966–1970: Gateshead
- * Club domestic league appearances and goals

George Francis Moutry Hardwick (2 February 1920 – 19 April 2004) was an English footballer, manager and coach. During his time as an active player, he was a left-sided defender for Middlesbrough and Oldham Athletic. He was also a member of the England national football team, playing in 13 international matches and serving as the team's first post-World War II captain in all 13 of those matches, and is the only England player to be captain in every one of his appearances.

In 1947, the nations of Great Britain joined to form a football team, which Hardwick captained and led to victory (6–1) against the rest of Europe.

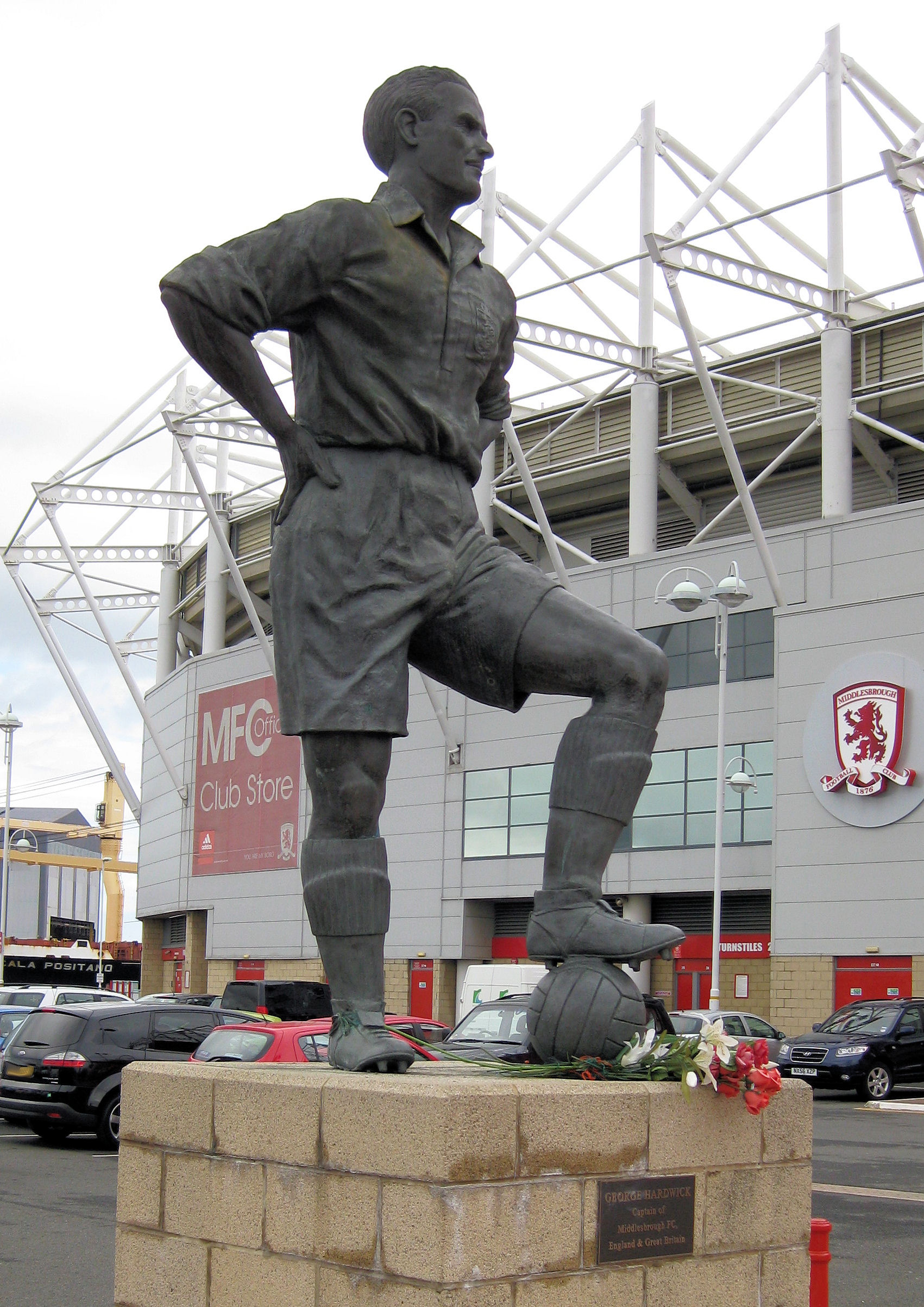
Statue of Hardwick which stands outside the Riverside Stadium, Middlesbrough

Owing to a knee injury, Hardwick's international career ended after twelve matches. He is held in high esteem by Middlesbrough fans, and is regarded as the greatest defender in the club's history.

After his career as a player, Hardwick served as player-manager for Oldham Athletic and manager for PSV Eindhoven, and for six months in 1957, the Netherlands national football team. He later managed Sunderland and Gateshead.

Today, his legacy lives on in the form of The George Hardwick Foundation, a charity dedicated to helping carers, former carers and patients. His wife Jennifer, who cared for George during his later years, is a patron. They have three main sites at Stockton, Middlesbrough and The University Hospital of North Tees.
