= 1949–50 FA Cup qualifying rounds =

Tournament details
- Country: England; Wales

The FA Cup 1949–50 is the 69th season of the world's oldest football knockout competition; The Football Association Challenge Cup, or FA Cup for short. The large number of clubs entering the tournament from lower down the English football league system meant that the competition started with a number of preliminary and qualifying rounds. The 25 victorious teams from the fourth round qualifying progressed to the first round proper.

== Extra preliminary round ==
=== Ties ===
Tie	Home team	Score	Away team
1	Alford United	6–4	Skegness Town
2	Amble	0–2	Newbiggin Colliery Welfare
3	Appleby Frodingham	1–1	Brigg Town
4	Arlesey Town	4–5	Huntingdon United
5	Armthorpe Welfare	4–5	Farsley Celtic
6	Ashington	5–2	Wardley Welfare
7	Aylesbury United	5–2	Bicester Town
8	Barnton	1–1	Knutsford
9	Basford United	0–1	Stanton Ironworks
10	Bedford Avenue	1–1	Bedford St Cuthberts
11	Bedford Corinthians	1–4	Houghton Rangers
12	Bentley Colliery	9–1	Upton Colliery
13	Bilston	1–0	Oswestry Town
14	Birtley	2–2	Heaton Stannington
15	Blackhall Colliery Welfare	1–0	Tow Law Town
16	Bolsover Colliery	2–1	Kiveton Park Colliery
17	Bootle Athletic	5–1	Stoneycroft
18	Boots Athletic	1–2	Measham Imperial
19	Boston United	7–0	Holbeach United
20	Bourne Town	5–3	Rufford Colliery
21	Bournemouth	1–0	Bournemouth Gasworks Athletic
22	Bourneville Athletic	1–6	Cradley Heath
23	Briggs Sports	7–0	Crittall Athletic
24	Brodsworth Main Colliery	3–2	Meltham
25	Brunswick Institute	7–3	Ferrybridge Amateur
26	Callender Athletic	0–7	Folkestone
27	Chesham United	3–0	Dickinsons
28	Chilton Athletic	4–1	Langley Park Colliery Welfare
29	Chippenham Town	7–0	Timsbury Athletic
30	Cinderhill Colliery	0–7	Heanor Athletic
31	Clapton	4–0	Brightlingsea United
32	Coleford Athletic	2–5	Swindon Victoria
33	Congleton Town	8–2	Wilmslow Albion
34	Cowes	4–0	Lymington
35	Cramlington Welfare	3–1	West Sleekburn Welfare
36	Creswell Colliery	3–0	Maltby Main Colliery
37	Crown & Manor	2–1	Tufnell Park
38	Dawdon Colliery Welfare	0–1	Crook Colliery Welfare
39	Dorchester Town	2–1	Blandford United
40	Earlestown	2–1	Crossens
41	Edgware Town	1–1	Hoddesdon Town
42	Ellesmere Port Town	2–3	Buxton
43	Eppleton Colliery Welfare	2–3	Consett
44	Epsom	6–0	Guildford
45	Eton Manor	2–1	Clacton Town
46	Frome Town	1–3	Chippenham United
47	Hamworthy	0–1	Portland United
48	Harrow Town	0–2	Wingate
49	Harwich & Parkeston	4–2	Chingford Town
50	Hatfield Town	6–2	Ruislip Town
51	Haydock C & B Recreation	5–2	Prescot B I
52	Headington United	9–4	Huntley & Palmers
53	Hemel Hempstead	6–0	Marlow
54	Henley Town	4–2	Pressed Steel
55	Hertford Town	3–5	Finchley
56	Hoylake Athletic	9–5	Southport Leyland Road
57	Ilkeston Town	2–3	Sutton Town
58	Langold W M C	3–3	Raleigh Athletic
59	Leatherhead	2–6	Hounslow Town
60	Llanelli	6–1	Hoffman Athletic (Stonehouse)
61	Lynemouth Welfare	6–2	Jarrow
62	Lyons Club	3–2	Pinner
63	Lysaghts Sports	3–1	Thorne Colliery
64	Margate	1–3	Faversham Town
65	Marine	1–0	Formby
66	Matlock Town	0–2	Port Sunlight
67	Mclaren Sports	3–1	Camberley
68	Moor Green	3–2	Boldmere St Michaels
69	Mossley	2–1	Ashton United
70	Newton Y M C A	3–4	Earle
71	Ollerton Colliery	0–4	Gedling Colliery
72	Osberton Radiator	5–0	Abingdon Town
73	Parkhouse Colliery	6–0	Jump Home Guard
74	Parliament Street Methodists	2–5	Teversal & Silverhill Colliery Welfare
75	Pilkington Recreation	2–1	Laceby
76	Potton United	1–2	Luton Amateur
77	Rainham Town	2–1	Woodford Town
78	Rickmansworth Town	2–2	Yiewsley
79	Ruislip Manor	4–2	Acton Town
80	Ryde Sports	1–0	Andover
81	Saffron Walden Town	2–3	Colchester Casuals
82	Sawbridgeworth	0–6	Tilbury
83	Shankhouse	1–4	Newburn
84	Shell	5–1	Atherton Collieries
85	Sheppey United	1–0	Ashford
86	Shilbottle Colliery Welfare	2–3	Gosforth & Coxlodge
87	Shotton Colliery Welfare	2–2	Spennymoor United
88	Silksworth Colliery Welfare	1–0	Cockfield
89	Sittingbourne	0–2	Erith & Belvedere
90	Slough Town	1–0	Slough Centre
91	Snowdown Colliery Welfare	2–1	Whitstable
92	South Normanton Miners Welfare	3–0	Sherwood Colliery
93	Southall	1–0	Berkhamsted Town
94	Spalding United	1–0	Stamford
95	Spencer Moulton	1–3	Devizes Town
96	St Philip's Marsh Adult School	1–2	Mount Hill Enterprise
97	Stansted	0–5	Grays Athletic
98	Steel Peech & Tozer S S	1–4	Rawmarsh Welfare
99	Stevenage Town	2–2	Willesden
100	Stocksbridge Works	4–1	Wombwell Athletic
101	Stork	2–5	Droylsden
102	Sutton Town (Birmingham)	3–0	Halesowen Town
103	Swindon G W R Corinthians	3–2	Calne & Harris United
104	Thornycroft Athletic	5–0	Sandown
105	Thynnes Athletic	0–6	Darlaston
106	Totton	3–0	Basingstoke Town
107	Usworth Colliery	0–2	Boldon Colliery Welfare
108	Wembley	2–2	Ware
109	Wigan Athletic	2–0	U G B St Helens
110	Willington	8–0	Seaham United
111	Winchester City	1–2	Newport I O W
112	Windsor & Eton	2–3	Hayes
113	Winterton Rangers	1–4	Ashby Institute
114	Wood Green Town	1–0	Polytechnic
115	Wootton Bassett Town	4–5	Warminster Town
116	Worksop Town	2–1	Bestwood Colliery

=== Replays ===
Tie	Home team	Score	Away team
3	Brigg Town	4–1	Appleby Frodingham
8	Knutsford	2–1	Barnton
10	Bedford St Cuthberts	0–0	Bedford Avenue
14	Heaton Stannington	2–2	Birtley
41	Edgware Town	3–0	Hoddesdon Town
58	Raleigh Athletic	0–2	Langold W M C
78	Yiewsley	2–0	Rickmansworth Town
87	Spennymoor United	4–2	Shotton Colliery Welfare
99	Willesden	7–2	Stevenage Town
108	Ware	2–2	Wembley

=== 2nd replay ===
Tie	Home team	Score	Away team
10	Bedford Avenue	3–2	Bedford St Cuthberts
14	Heaton Stannington	4–3	Birtley
108	Wembley	1–5	Ware

== Preliminary round ==
=== Ties ===
Tie	Home team	Score	Away team
1	Abbey United	2–1	Wisbech Town
2	Alford United	3–3	Bourne Town
3	Alnwick Town	2–4	Ashington
4	Altrincham	2–3	Mossley
5	Aspatria Spartans	3–1	Cleator Moor Celtic
6	Aylesford Paper Mills	1–10	Bowater Lloyds
7	Baldock Town	2–0	Leighton United
8	Barking	1–1	Eton Manor
9	Barnoldswick & District	1–3	Nelson
10	Barry Town	3–1	Soundwell
11	Barwell Athletic	3–0	Coalville Town
12	Bath City	7–1	Roundway Hospital
13	Bedford Town	2–0	Kempston Rovers
14	Bedworth Town	1–3	Nuneaton Borough
15	Beighton Miners Welfare	5–1	Grimethorpe Athletic
16	Bentley Colliery	3–1	Ashby Institute
17	Bexhill Town	3–4	Littlehampton Town
18	Bideford	1–1	Newton Abbot Spurs
19	Bilston	2–1	Darlaston
20	Birmingham City Transport	1–5	Cradley Heath
21	Blackhall Colliery Welfare	1–4	Consett
22	Blyth Spartans	3–0	Annfield Plain
23	Boldon Colliery Welfare	1–2	Heaton Stannington
24	Bolsover Colliery	4–5	Creswell Colliery
25	Bootle Athletic	5–1	Earlestown
26	Boston United	2–1	Teversal & Silverhill Colliery Welfare
27	Bournemouth	5–2	Thornycroft Athletic
28	Bridgwater Town	1–1	Taunton
29	Bridlington Central United	8–0	Cargo Fleet Works
30	Briggs Sports	10–1	Dagenham British Legion
31	Brodsworth Main Colliery	2–0	South Kirkby Colliery
32	Brunswick Institute	0–3	Farsley Celtic
33	Burscough	2–1	Marine
34	Canterbury City	2–1	Chatham Town
35	Cardiff Corinthians	0–1	Mount Hill Enterprise
36	Chichester City	2–2	Eastbourne Comrades
37	Chorley	5–0	De Havilland (Bolton)
38	Civil Service	0–3	Hatfield Town
39	Clandown	3–1	Peasedown Miners Welfare
40	Clapton	7–1	Harlow Town
41	Clevedon	2–1	Hanham Athletic
42	Clitheroe	4–2	Lytham
43	Cockermouth	8–2	Bowthorn United
44	Congleton Town	6–3	Shell
45	Corby Town	7–1	Rothwell Town
46	Crook Colliery Welfare	3–6	Easington Colliery Welfare
47	Denaby United	3–1	Sheffield
48	Devizes Town	4–4	Chippenham Town
49	Dover	7–2	Bexley
50	Droylsden	10–1	Nantwich
51	Earle w/o-scr Orrell		
52	East Cowes Victoria	4–1	Gosport Borough Athletic
53	Epsom	4–2	Cobham
54	Evenwood Town	5–1	Stanley United
55	Eynesbury Rovers	2–1	Wolverton Town & B R
56	Faversham Town	0–1	Erith & Belvedere
57	Felixstowe United	0–5	City Of Norwich School O B U
58	Finchley	0–2	Enfield
59	Firbeck Main Colliery	2–3	Staveley Welfare
60	Fleetwood	5–3	Galgate
61	Folkestone	1–1	Snowdown Colliery Welfare
62	Frickley Colliery	1–0	Yorkshire Amateur
63	Gedling Colliery	2–0	Langold W M C
64	Glastonbury	1–4	Wells City
65	Glossop	1–2	Hyde United
66	Goole Town	5–1	Barton Town
67	Gorleston	4–1	Holt United (Norfolk)
68	Gravesend & Northfleet	4–0	Sheppey United
69	Grays Athletic	5–1	Colchester Casuals
70	Great Harwood	1–1	Bacup Borough
71	Great Yarmouth Town	1–1	Cromer
72	Harwich & Parkeston	4–2	Brentwood & Warley
73	Harworth Colliery Athletic	2–2	Stocksbridge Works
74	Hastings United	3–0	Shoreham
75	Haydock C & B Recreation	1–2	Bangor City
76	Hayes	1–0	Banbury Spencer
77	Haywards Heath	5–1	East Grinstead
78	Hednesford Town	0–1	Dudley Town
79	Hemel Hempstead	3–1	Headington United
80	Hendon	0–4	Wealdstone
81	Henley Town	0–3	Yiewsley
82	Hinckley Athletic	11–0	Morris Sports
83	Hitchin Town	5–0	Houghton Rangers
84	Horden Colliery Welfare	8–4	Ferryhill Athletic
85	Hounslow Town	2–2	Wimbledon
86	Hove	3–2	Newhaven
87	Hoylake Athletic	0–3	St Helens Town
88	Hoyland Common Athletic	2–1	Kilnhurst Colliery
89	Huntingdon United	4–2	Bedford Avenue
90	Ibstock Penistone Rovers	0–2	Tamworth
91	Ilford	4–1	Ford Sports (Dagenham)
92	Ilminster Town	4–1	Street
93	Knutsford	0–9	Northwich Victoria
94	Leiston	0–5	Achilles
95	Letchworth Town	8–1	St Neots St Marys
96	Linby Colliery	1–2	Grantham
97	Llanelli	4–1	Stonehouse
98	Longfleet St Mary's	0–1	Portland United
99	Lostock Gralam	1–2	Buxton
100	Luddington	1–7	Brigg Town
101	Lye Town	2–0	Brierley Hill Alliance
102	Lyons Club	0–4	Crown & Manor
103	Macclesfield	3–2	Port Sunlight
104	Maidenhead United	1–1	Osberton Radiator
105	March Town	4–0	Parson Drove
106	Melksham	2–1	Swindon G W R Corinthians
107	Merthyr Tydfil	5–1	Ebbw Vale
108	Moor Green	2–2	Bromsgrove Rovers
109	Morecambe	4–5	Leyland Motors
110	Morpeth Town	2–2	Gosforth & Coxlodge
111	Newbiggin Colliery Welfare	3–0	Cramlington Welfare
112	Newmarket Town	4–4	Chatteris Town
113	North Shields	7–0	Newburn
114	Norton Woodseats	3–1	Dinnington Athletic
115	Ossett Town	7–0	Pilkington Recreation
116	Oxford City	5–2	N A C Athletic
117	Paulton Rovers	4–0	Purton
118	Pirelli General Cables	3–4	Cowes
119	Poole Town	9–1	R A O C Hilsea
120	Prescot Cables	3–0	Skelmersdale United
121	Rainham Town	1–2	Upminster
122	Ramsgate Athletic	6–0	Betteshanger Colliery Welfare
123	Rawmarsh Welfare	6–3	Parkhouse Colliery
124	Redhill	7–3	Dorking
125	Rhyl	2–0	Llandudno
126	Romsey Town	1–4	Dorchester Town
127	Rossendale United	5–2	Horwich R M I
128	Royston Town	0–6	Bury Town
129	Rugby Town	2–3	Moira United
130	Ruislip Manor	1–2	St Albans City
131	Ryde Sports	1–1	Newport I O W
132	Salisbury	8–0	Warminster Town
133	Scalegill	6–4	Florence & Ullcoats United
134	Seaham Colliery Welfare	1–1	Shildon
135	Selby Town	5–0	Lysaghts Sports
136	Shepshed Albion	0–0	Atherstone Town
137	Sheringham	0–1	Stowmarket Corinthians
138	Silksworth Colliery Welfare	3–3	West Auckland Town
139	Slough Town	3–2	Aylesbury United
140	South Bank East End	2–5	Whitby
141	South Hetton Colliery Welfare	5–1	Chilton Athletic
142	South Liverpool	0–1	Wigan Athletic
143	South Lynn	4–0	Wimblington Old Boys
144	South Normanton Miners Welfare	1–1	Worksop Town
145	South Shields	9–2	Lynemouth Welfare
146	Southall	6–2	Wycombe Wanderers
147	Spalding United	3–2	Heanor Athletic
148	St Austell	4–1	Oak Villa
149	St Neots & District	3–2	Vauxhall Motors
150	Stafford Rangers	3–0	Worcester City
151	Stanton Ironworks	3–5	Ransome & Marles
152	Stewartby Works	3–6	Luton Amateur
153	Stourbridge	0–0	Kidderminster Harriers
154	Sutton Town	3–2	Measham Imperial
155	Sutton Town (Birmingham)	4–0	Staffs Casuals
156	Sutton United	0–1	Kingstonian
157	Swindon Victoria	0–7	Trowbridge Town
158	Tavistock	0–4	Barnstaple Town
159	Tilbury	2–2	Leyton
160	Tiverton Town	2–2	Dartmouth United
161	Tonbridge	3–1	Woolwich Polytechnic
162	Tooting & Mitcham United	4–0	Farnham Town
163	Troedyrhiw	3–0	Bristol Aeroplane Company
164	Truro City	2–6	Ilfracombe Town
165	Uxbridge	2–0	Chesham United
166	Vickers Armstrong	7–2	Mclaren Sports
167	Walton & Hersham	2–2	Carshalton Athletic
168	Welwyn Garden City	0–2	Edgware Town
169	West Stanley	0–0	Hexham Hearts
170	Westbury United	1–2	Chippenham United
171	Weston Super Mare	2–3	Gloucester City
172	Weston Super Mare St Johns	2–7	Lovells Athletic
173	Weymouth	6–3	Totton
174	Whitton United	3–0	Churchman Sports
175	Willington	2–2	Spennymoor United
176	Wingate	1–5	Ware
177	Winsford United	9–1	Wheelock Albion
178	Woking	1–0	Metropolitan Police
179	Wood Green Town	0–1	Willesden

=== Replays ===
Tie	Home team	Score	Away team
2	Bourne Town	5–3	Alford United
8	Newton Abbot Spurs	2–4	Bideford
18	Taunton	1–3	Bridgwater Town
28	Eastbourne Comrades	6–0	Chichester City
36	Chippenham Town	4–3	Devizes Town
48	Barking	5–3	Eton Manor
61	Snowdown Colliery Welfare	1–1	Folkestone
70	Bacup Borough	5–1	Great Harwood
71	Cromer	3–4	Great Yarmouth Town
73	Stocksbridge Works	8–4	Harworth Colliery Athletic
85	Wimbledon	5–0	Hounslow Town
104	Osberton Radiator	1–0	Maidenhead United
108	Bromsgrove Rovers	4–1	Moor Green
110	Gosforth & Coxlodge	3–1	Morpeth Town
112	Chatteris Town	1–4	Newmarket Town
131	Newport I O W	3–5	Ryde Sports
134	Shildon	2–3	Seaham Colliery Welfare
136	Atherstone Town	8–2	Shepshed Albion
138	West Auckland Town	2–5	Silksworth Colliery Welfare
144	Worksop Town	1–2	South Normanton Miners Welfare
153	Kidderminster Harriers	2–3	Stourbridge
159	Leyton	2–3	Tilbury
160	Dartmouth United	2–0	Tiverton Town
167	Carshalton Athletic	0–8	Walton & Hersham
169	Hexham Hearts	2–1	West Stanley
175	Spennymoor United	2–4	Willington

=== 2nd replay ===
Tie	Home team	Score	Away team
61	Folkestone	1–2	Snowdown Colliery Welfare

== 1st qualifying round ==
=== Ties ===
Tie	Home team	Score	Away team
1	Ashington	2–3	Heaton Stannington
2	Aspatria Spartans	6–1	Milnthorpe Corinthians
3	Barking	4–1	Clapton
4	Barry Town	1–1	Gloucester City
5	Barwell Athletic	2–2	Atherstone Town
6	Bath City	0–2	Salisbury
7	Bedford Town	2–0	Luton Amateur
8	Bentley Colliery	4–2	Farsley Celtic
9	Bideford	6–0	Ilminster Town
10	Bootle Athletic	2–1	Prescot Cables
11	Boston United	2–3	Grantham
12	Bournemouth	3–1	Portland United
13	Bowater Lloyds	2–3	Canterbury City
14	Briggs Sports	0–0	Harwich & Parkeston
15	Bromsgrove Rovers	2–1	Bilston
16	Brush Sports	2–0	Tamworth
17	Bury Town	0–1	Cambridge Town
18	Buxton	3–0	Hyde United
19	Chorley	3–1	Bacup Borough
20	Clandown	3–0	Chippenham United
21	Clevedon	2–1	Troedyrhiw
22	Cockermouth	1–3	Kells Welfare Centre
23	Cowes	5–1	Dorchester Town
24	Cradley Heath	1–0	Lye Town
25	Dartmouth United	2–0	Bridgwater Town
26	Darwen	0–5	Nelson
27	Denaby United	0–2	Beighton Miners Welfare
28	Dover	2–0	Snowdown Colliery Welfare
29	Dudley Town	0–0	Sutton Town (Birmingham)
30	Earle	1–3	Rhyl
31	Eastbourne Comrades	0–1	Horsham
32	Enfield	0–0	Wealdstone
33	Erith & Belvedere	3–0	Tonbridge
34	Evenwood Town	1–4	Consett
35	Eynesbury Rovers	0–1	Hitchin Town
36	Fleetwood	3–0	Clitheroe
37	Frickley Colliery	1–1	Goole Town
38	Gorleston	5–0	Achilles
39	Gosforth & Coxlodge	0–4	Blyth Spartans
40	Gothic	1–3	Lowestoft Town
41	Great Yarmouth Town	4–1	Whitton United
42	Hastings United	14–2	Hove
43	Hatfield Town	4–1	Willesden
44	Haywards Heath	7–0	Bognor Regis Town
45	Hemel Hempstead	1–4	Uxbridge
46	Hinckley Athletic	1–3	Gresley Rovers
47	Histon Institute	3–2	South Lynn
48	Hoyland Common Athletic	1–1	Creswell Colliery
49	Huntingdon United	2–3	Baldock Town
50	Ilford	1–2	Grays Athletic
51	Ilfracombe Town	2–3	St Austell
52	Kettering Town	5–1	Northampton Amateurs
53	King's Lynn	3–2	March Town
54	Llanelli	0–3	Merthyr Tydfil
55	Lovells Athletic	4–1	Mount Hill Enterprise
56	Macclesfield	1–2	Congleton Town
57	Melksham	3–8	Paulton Rovers
58	Mossley	3–2	Northwich Victoria
59	Newmarket Town	1–0	Abbey United
60	North Shields	3–0	Newbiggin Colliery Welfare
61	Nuneaton Borough	7–1	Moira United
62	Ossett Town	1–3	Brodsworth Main Colliery
63	Oxford City	1–1	Slough Town
64	Penrith	2–3	Netherfield
65	Peterborough United	5–1	Desborough Town
66	Poole Town	5–1	East Cowes Victoria
67	Portrack Shamrocks	1–0	Bridlington Central United
68	Ramsgate Athletic	0–0	Gravesend & Northfleet
69	Ransome & Marles	4–6	Gedling Colliery
70	Rawmarsh Welfare	3–2	Staveley Welfare
71	Rossendale United	5–1	Leyland Motors
72	Rushden Town	0–3	Symingtons Recreation
73	Ryde Sports	2–6	Weymouth
74	Scalegill w/o-scr High Duty Alloys		
75	Seaham Colliery Welfare	1–1	Easington Colliery Welfare
76	Selby Town	2–1	Brigg Town
77	Silksworth Colliery Welfare	0–0	South Hetton Colliery Welfare
78	South Bank St Peters	4–2	Filey Town
79	South Normanton Miners Welfare	3–2	Bourne Town
80	South Shields	3–1	Hexham Hearts
81	Southall	3–1	Osberton Radiator
82	St Albans City	4–1	Crown & Manor
83	St Helens Town	0–3	Bangor City
84	St Neots & District	3–1	Letchworth Town
85	Stocksbridge Works	3–2	Norton Woodseats
86	Stourbridge	0–3	Stafford Rangers
87	Stowmarket Corinthians	3–3	City Of Norwich School O B U
88	Sutton Town	0–4	Spalding United
89	Tilbury	2–2	Upminster
90	Trowbridge Town	3–1	Chippenham Town
91	Vickers Armstrong	2–4	Tooting & Mitcham United
92	Walton & Hersham	1–0	Redhill
93	Ware	0–2	Edgware Town
94	Wellingborough Town	0–5	Corby Town
95	Wells City	1–0	Barnstaple Town
96	Whitby	2–2	Billingham Synthonia
97	Whitby Albion Rangers	1–2	South Bank
98	Wigan Athletic	1–1	Burscough
99	Willington	2–2	Horden Colliery Welfare
100	Wimbledon	0–0	Kingstonian
101	Winsford United	2–3	Droylsden
102	Woking	1–2	Epsom
103	Worthing	5–0	Littlehampton Town
104	Yiewsley	2–2	Hayes

=== Replays ===
Tie	Home team	Score	Away team
4	Gloucester City	1–0	Barry Town
5	Atherstone Town	4–3	Barwell Athletic
14	Harwich & Parkeston	0–0	Briggs Sports
29	Sutton Town (Birmingham)	0–1	Dudley Town
32	Wealdstone	2–0	Enfield
37	Goole Town	1–0	Frickley Colliery
48	Creswell Colliery	0–2	Hoyland Common Athletic
63	Slough Town	4–2	Oxford City
68	Gravesend & Northfleet	2–1	Ramsgate Athletic
75	Easington Colliery Welfare	2–1	Seaham Colliery Welfare
77	South Hetton Colliery Welfare	0–2	Silksworth Colliery Welfare
87	Stowmarket Corinthians	3–3	City Of Norwich School O B U
89	Upminster	2–4	Tilbury
96	Billingham Synthonia	3–0	Whitby
98	Burscough	1–5	Wigan Athletic
99	Horden Colliery Welfare	4–0	Willington
100	Kingstonian	1–1	Wimbledon
104	Hayes	3–2	Yiewsley

=== 2nd replays ===
Tie	Home team	Score	Away team
14	Harwich & Parkeston	3–0	Briggs Sports
87	Stowmarket Corinthians	3–0	City Of Norwich School O B U
100	Kingstonian	6–3	Wimbledon

== 2nd qualifying round ==
=== Ties ===
Tie	Home team	Score	Away team
1	Aspatria Spartans	1–0	Scalegill
2	Atherstone Town	2–2	Nuneaton Borough
3	Barking	4–0	Grays Athletic
4	Bedford Town	3–0	St Neots & District
5	Bideford	1–1	Wells City
6	Blyth Spartans	5–1	Heaton Stannington
7	Bournemouth	3–3	Cowes
8	Cambridge Town	1–0	Newmarket Town
9	Chorley	2–3	Rossendale United
10	Clandown	1–6	Salisbury
11	Congleton Town	1–2	Droylsden
12	Corby Town	6–1	Symingtons Recreation
13	Cradley Heath	1–2	Bromsgrove Rovers
14	Dartmouth United	2–1	St Austell
15	Dover	3–0	Erith & Belvedere
16	Edgware Town	5–1	Hatfield Town
17	Epsom	1–3	Kingstonian
18	Fleetwood	3–2	Nelson
19	Gloucester City	3–0	Clevedon
20	Goole Town	1–1	Bentley Colliery
21	Gorleston	4–2	Stowmarket Corinthians
22	Gravesend & Northfleet	5–1	Canterbury City
23	Gresley Rovers	3–2	Brush Sports
24	Harwich & Parkeston	0–2	Tilbury
25	Hastings United	4–1	Horsham
26	Histon Institute	2–2	King's Lynn
27	Hitchin Town	4–1	Baldock Town
28	Horden Colliery Welfare	2–1	Easington Colliery Welfare
29	Hoyland Common Athletic	3–2	Beighton Miners Welfare
30	Kettering Town	0–5	Peterborough United
31	Lovells Athletic	1–0	Merthyr Tydfil
32	Lowestoft Town	3–2	Great Yarmouth Town
33	Mossley	2–1	Buxton
34	Netherfield	2–0	Kells Welfare Centre
35	North Shields	2–0	South Shields
36	Paulton Rovers	1–4	Trowbridge Town
37	Rhyl	4–1	Bangor City
38	Selby Town	1–0	Brodsworth Main Colliery (Selby Town disqualified)
39	Silksworth Colliery Welfare	2–1	Consett
40	Slough Town	1–2	Hayes
41	South Bank	0–1	Billingham Synthonia
42	South Bank St Peters	2–2	Portrack Shamrocks
43	South Normanton Miners Welfare	0–3	Grantham
44	Southall	4–1	Uxbridge
45	Spalding United	5–2	Gedling Colliery
46	St Albans City	0–1	Wealdstone
47	Stafford Rangers	2–2	Dudley Town
48	Stocksbridge Works	1–2	Rawmarsh Welfare
49	Tooting & Mitcham United	1–1	Walton & Hersham
50	Weymouth	4–0	Poole Town
51	Wigan Athletic	6–1	Bootle Athletic
52	Worthing	2–4	Haywards Heath

=== Replays ===
Tie	Home team	Score	Away team
2	Nuneaton Borough	1–1	Atherstone Town
5	Wells City	2–3	Bideford
7	Cowes	4–0	Bournemouth
20	Bentley Colliery	2–4	Goole Town
26	King's Lynn	5–2	Histon Institute
42	Portrack Shamrocks	2–1	South Bank St Peters
47	Dudley Town	1–0	Stafford Rangers
49	Walton & Hersham	1–2	Tooting & Mitcham United

=== 2nd replay ===
Tie	Home team	Score	Away team
2	Nuneaton Borough	2–1	Atherstone Town

== 3rd qualifying round ==
=== Ties ===
Tie	Home team	Score	Away team
1	Aspatria Spartans	2–4	Netherfield
2	Barking	1–2	Tilbury
3	Bedford Town	2–0	Hitchin Town
4	Bideford	4–2	Dartmouth United
5	Billingham Synthonia	3–1	Portrack Shamrocks
6	Blyth Spartans	1–5	North Shields
7	Brodsworth Main Colliery	1–1	Goole Town
8	Bromsgrove Rovers	3–1	Dudley Town
9	Corby Town	1–0	Peterborough United
10	Cowes	1–5	Weymouth
11	Droylsden	1–3	Mossley
12	Edgware Town	0–1	Wealdstone
13	Fleetwood	5–0	Rossendale United
14	Gloucester City	3–0	Lovells Athletic
15	Gravesend & Northfleet	5–0	Dover
16	Hayes	4–1	Southall
17	Haywards Heath	0–1	Hastings United
18	Horden Colliery Welfare	3–1	Silksworth Colliery Welfare
19	King's Lynn	3–1	Cambridge Town
20	Kingstonian	5–3	Tooting & Mitcham United
21	Lowestoft Town	0–3	Gorleston
22	Nuneaton Borough	2–2	Gresley Rovers
23	Rawmarsh Welfare	4–2	Hoyland Common Athletic
24	Rhyl	2–0	Wigan Athletic
25	Spalding United	0–2	Grantham
26	Trowbridge Town	1–0	Salisbury

=== Replays ===
Tie	Home team	Score	Away team
7	Goole Town	8–2	Brodsworth Main Colliery
22	Gresley Rovers	2–3	Nuneaton Borough

== 4th qualifying round ==
The teams that entered in this round are: Leytonstone, Colchester United, Barnet, Bishop Auckland, Gillingham, Cheltenham Town, Guildford City, Chelmsford City, Gainsborough Trinity, Scunthorpe United, Shrewsbury Town, Scarborough, Stockton, Workington, Dulwich Hamlet, Walthamstow Avenue, Wellington Town, Runcorn, Stalybridge Celtic, Lancaster City, Dartford, Hereford United, Romford and Witton Albion.

=== Ties ===
Tie	Home team	Score	Away team
1	Barnet	2–6	Chelmsford City
2	Bideford	1–1	Gloucester City
3	Billingham Synthonia	1–1	Horden Colliery Welfare
4	Bromsgrove Rovers	5–2	Shrewsbury Town
5	Corby Town	1–6	Gravesend & Northfleet
6	Fleetwood	4–1	Lancaster City
7	Gorleston	1–1	Tilbury
8	Grantham	2–0	Gainsborough Trinity
9	Guildford City	2–3	Gillingham
10	Hastings United	2–0	Bedford Town
11	Hereford United	1–1	Cheltenham Town
12	King's Lynn	1–1	Dartford
13	Leytonstone	3–2	Hayes
14	Mossley	1–0	Runcorn
15	Netherfield	2–0	Workington
16	North Shields	1–1	Scarborough
17	Rhyl	6–0	Stalybridge Celtic
18	Romford	3–0	Kingstonian
19	Scunthorpe & Lindsey United	0–0	Goole Town
20	Stockton	7–0	Bishop Auckland
21	Walthamstow Avenue	3–3	Dulwich Hamlet
22	Wealdstone	1–0	Colchester United
23	Wellington Town	3–4	Nuneaton Borough
24	Weymouth	3–3	Trowbridge Town
25	Witton Albion	3–0	Rawmarsh Welfare

=== Replays ===
Tie	Home team	Score	Away team
2	Gloucester City	3–1	Bideford
3	Horden Colliery Welfare	0–1	Billingham Synthonia
7	Tilbury	2–1	Gorleston
11	Cheltenham Town	2–2	Hereford United
12	Dartford	1–2	King's Lynn
16	Scarborough	1–3	North Shields
19	Goole Town	2–0	Scunthorpe & Lindsey United
21	Dulwich Hamlet	1–3	Walthamstow Avenue
24	Trowbridge Town	1–2	Weymouth

=== 2nd replay ===
Tie	Home team	Score	Away team
11	Hereford United	4–2	Cheltenham Town

== 1949–50 FA Cup ==
See 1949–50 FA Cup for details of the rounds from the first round proper onwards.
