= 1946–47 FA Cup qualifying rounds =

Tournament details
- Country: England; Wales

The FA Cup 1946–47 is the 66th season of the world's oldest football knockout competition; The Football Association Challenge Cup, or FA Cup for short. The large number of clubs entering the tournament from lower down the English football league system meant that the competition started with a number of preliminary and qualifying rounds. The 25 victorious teams from the fourth round qualifying progressed to the first round proper.

== Extra preliminary round ==
=== Ties ===
Tie	Home team	Score	Away team
1	Aylesbury United	2–1	Morris Motors
2	Barking	9–0	London Transport
3	Bicester Town	2–3	Headington United
4	Brentwood & Warley	3–4	Tilbury
5	Calne & Harris United	3–4	Warminster Town
6	Enfield	1–1	Wood Green Town
7	Finchley	2–0	Polytechnic
8	Hanham Athletic	1–2	Soundwell
9	Harwich & Parkeston	8–1	Dagenham British Legion
10	Hatfield United	2–3	Chipperfield
11	Henley Town	6–6	Uxbridge
12	Hertford Town	6–2	Leavesden
13	Hoffman Athletic (Stonehouse)	7–0	Frome Town
14	Horden Colliery Welfare	3–3	Easington Colliery Welfare
15	Hounslow Town	1–4	Maidenhead United
16	Langley Park Colliery Welfare	0–2	Evenwood Town
17	Metal & Produce Recovery	1–1	Chesham United
18	Pinner	2–3	Hendon
19	Redford Sports	3–7	Yiewsley
20	Saffron Walden Town	4–2	Ware
21	Spencer Moulton	2–4	Melksham
22	Trafalgar Sports	2–6	R A O C Hilsea
23	Twickenham	1–2	Acton Town
24	Welwyn Garden City	2–2	Berkhamsted Town
25	Wootton Bassett Town	5–0	Dilton Rovers
26	Wycombe Wanderers	2–0	Marlow

=== Replays ===
Tie	Home team	Score	Away team
6	Wood Green Town	4–3	Enfield
11	Uxbridge	3–1	Henley Town
14	Easington Colliery Welfare	2–0	Horden Colliery Welfare
17	Chesham United	5–0	Metal & Produce Recovery
24	Berkhamsted Town	4–2	Welwyn Garden City

== Preliminary round ==
=== Ties ===
Tie	Home team	Score	Away team
1	Annfield Plain w/o-scr Shankhouse		
2	Arlesey Town	1–2	Biggleswade & District
3	Atherstone Town	4–2	Boldmere St Michaels
4	Aylesbury United	6–2	Osberton Radiator
5	Barking w/o-scr Severalls Athletic		
6	Basingstoke Town	1–1	Salisbury Corinthians
7	Bedford Town	1–1	Wolverton Town
8	Bexhill Town	5–2	Hove
9	Birmingham City Transport	0–5	Stourbridge
10	Bishop's Stortford	2–1	Chipperfield
11	Bournemouth	2–4	Poole Town
12	Bournemouth Gasworks Athletic w/o-scr Weymouth S A A		
13	Brandon Colliery Welfare	3–3	Stanley United
14	Brodsworth Main Colliery	9–1	Lysaghts Sports
15	Bromsgrove Rovers	0–3	Dudley Town
16	Buxton	2–2	Hyde United
17	Callender Athletic	2–3	Woolwich Polytechnic
18	Chatham	0–8	Folkestone
19	Clandown	8–3	Purton
20	Crittall Athletic	4–2	Woodford Town
21	Dartford	2–5	Sheppey United
22	Denaby United	4–1	Maltby Main Colliery
23	Devizes Town	1–2	Westbury United
24	Distington	1–7	Lowca
25	East Cowes Victoria	4–1	Portsmouth Electricity
26	East Grinstead	11–0	Shoreham
27	Eastbourne	4–1	Newhaven
28	Ebbw Vale	2–2	Llanelli
29	Eden Colliery	2–8	Crook Colliery Welfare
30	Edgware Town	1–2	Harrow Town
31	Ekco	2–0	Eton Manor
32	Ellesmere Port Town	9–0	Nantwich
33	Epsom	0–5	Metropolitan Police
34	Erith & Belvedere	3–3	Gravesend & Northfleet
35	Eynesbury Rovers	1–0	Waterlows
36	Ferryhill Athletic	2–1	Blackhall Colliery Welfare
37	Finchley	3–1	Hendon
38	Ford Sports (Dagenham)	2–4	Clapton
39	Frizington United	3–2	Haig Colliery
40	Gosforth & Coxlodge	6–2	Amble
41	Great Harwood	2–6	Horwich R M I
42	Harwich & Parkeston	3–2	Ilford
43	Harworth Colliery Athletic	8–1	Upton Colliery
44	Hastings & St Leonards	3–3	Worthing
45	Hayes	7–1	Pressed Steel
46	Headington United	3–2	Banbury Spencer
47	Hednesford Town	0–3	Hereford United
48	Hertford Town	7–2	Saffron Walden Town
49	Hoddesdon Town	4–3	Berkhamsted Town
50	Kells Welfare Centre	4–0	William Colliery
51	Kingstonian w/o-scr Epsom Town		
52	Kiveton Park Colliery	1–2	Ossett Town
53	Leyton	3–0	Hoffman Athletic (Chelmsford)
54	Littlehampton Town	1–2	Bognor Regis Town
55	Llandudno	3–4	Northwich Victoria
56	Lloyds (Sittingbourne)	4–2	Shorts Sports
57	Lytham	1–1	Leyland Motors
58	Maidstone United	3–1	Margate
59	Matlock Town	2–5	Sheffield
60	Melksham	4–1	Swindon Victoria
61	Merthyr Tydfil	4–1	Cardiff Corinthians
62	Murton Colliery Welfare	3–2	South Shields{2}
63	Nelson	1–2	Morecambe
64	Nuneaton Borough	3–1	Darlaston
65	Odd Down	0–3	Soundwell
66	Parton United w/o-scr Salterbeck		
67	Paulton Rovers	2–4	Hoffman Athletic (Stonehouse)
68	Penrith	1–5	Cleator Moor Celtic
69	R A O C Hilsea	4–3	Cowes
70	Ramsgate Athletic	9–0	Dover
71	Rawmarsh Welfare	5–1	Firbeck Main Colliery
72	Redhill	3–9	Tooting & Mitcham United
73	Romford	2–1	Grays Athletic
74	Ryde Sports	1–8	Gosport Borough Athletic
75	Sandown	3–3	Newport I O W
76	Scalegill	2–4	Moss Bay
77	Scunthorpe & Lindsey United	5–2	Norton Woodseats
78	Seaham Colliery Welfare	7–0	Dawdon Colliery Welfare
79	Selby Town	6–0	Meltham Mills
80	Shildon	2–2	Easington Colliery Welfare
81	Slough United	4–2	Lyons Club
82	Southall	2–5	Wycombe Wanderers
83	Spennymoor United	7–2	Willington
84	St Albans City	5–1	Apsley
85	Street	2–2	Wells City
86	Swindon G W R Corinthians	5–1	Wootton Bassett Town
87	Thorne Colliery	0–0	Bradford United
88	Thornycroft Athletic	2–0	Andover
89	Thurnscoe	0–5	Wombwell Athletic
90	Tilbury	3–0	Clacton Town
91	Tow Law Town	1–3	Chilton & Windlestone
92	Trimdon Grange Colliery	3–3	Evenwood Town
93	Trowbridge Town	6–0	Chippenham Town
94	Uxbridge	7–2	Chesham United
95	Vauxhall Motors	2–4	Luton Amateur
96	Vickers Armstrong	5–0	P O Engineers
97	Walton & Hersham	11–0	Guildford
98	Warminster Town	4–6	Pewsey Y M
99	Wealdstone	6–1	Tufnell Park
100	West Auckland Town w/o-scr Usworth Colliery		
101	Weston Super Mare St Johns	0–5	Gloucester City
102	Whitstable	3–10	Ashford
103	Wigan Athletic	3–2	Crossens
104	Wimbledon	3–0	Carshalton Athletic
105	Windsor & Eton	4–2	Oxford City
106	Wombwell Main Welfare	2–2	Grimethorpe Rovers
107	Wood Green Town	4–0	Acton Town
108	Yiewsley	3–3	Maidenhead United

=== Replays ===
Tie	Home team	Score	Away team
6	Salisbury Corinthians	2–2	Basingstoke Town
7	Wolverton Town	1–2	Bedford Town
13	Stanley United	1–3	Brandon Colliery Welfare
16	Hyde United	2–3	Buxton (Buxton disqualified)
28	Llanelli	5–2	Ebbw Vale
34	Gravesend & Northfleet	4–1	Erith & Belvedere
44	Worthing	2–2	Hastings & St Leonards
57	Lytham	0–3	Leyland Motors
75	Newport I O W	3–2	Sandown
80	Easington Colliery Welfare	2–4	Shildon
85	Wells City	1–2	Street
87	Bradford United	1–2	Thorne Colliery
92	Evenwood Town	2–1	Trimdon Grange Colliery
106	Grimethorpe Rovers	6–1	Wombwell Main Welfare
108	Maidenhead United	3–0	Yiewsley

=== 2nd replays ===
Tie	Home team	Score	Away team
6	Salisbury Corinthians	2–1	Basingstoke Town
44	Worthing	3–2	Hastings & St Leonards

== 1st qualifying round ==
=== Ties ===
Tie	Home team	Score	Away team
1	Annfield Plain	1–2	Newburn
2	Atherstone Town	1–4	Nuneaton Borough
3	Aylesbury United	2–3	Headington United
4	Barry Town	4–1	Clevedon
5	Basford United	2–1	Ollerton Colliery
6	Bexhill Town	3–1	East Grinstead
7	Biggleswade & District	1–7	Bedford Avenue
8	Brandon Colliery Welfare	2–1	Evenwood Town
9	Brigham & Cowan	2–2	Billingham Synthonia
10	Brodsworth Main Colliery	1–1	Denaby United
11	Chorley	4–1	Hurst
12	Consett	7–0	Gosforth & Coxlodge
13	Crittall Athletic	3–1	Clapton
14	Dartmouth United	5–2	Plymouth United
15	Darwen	1–1	Horwich R M I
16	Dinnington Athletic	3–4	Frickley Colliery
17	Dudley Town	1–1	Stourbridge
18	Ferryhill Athletic	3–1	Chilton & Windlestone
19	Fodens Motor Works	3–6	Bangor City
20	Folkestone	2–1	Ramsgate Athletic
21	Glossop	2–6	Rhyl
22	Goole Town	2–4	Yorkshire Amateur
23	Gothic	1–1	Gorleston
24	Great Yarmouth Town	5–1	Old Grammarians
25	Harrow Town	4–3	Wealdstone
26	Harwich & Parkeston	0–3	Barking
27	Haywards Heath	0–1	Bognor Regis Town
28	Hereford United	1–0	Bourneville Athletic
29	Hoddesdon Town	3–2	Bishop's Stortford
30	Hoffman Athletic (Stonehouse)	2–1	Clandown
31	Hyde United	1–2	Ellesmere Port Town
32	Kells Welfare Centre	1–2	Lowca
33	Kettering Town	2–0	Rushden Town
34	Leighton United	2–1	Eynesbury Rovers
35	Letchworth Town	0–2	Hitchin Town
36	Lloyds (Sittingbourne)	1–4	Gravesend & Northfleet
37	Lovells Athletic	1–0	Aberaman & Aberdare
38	Luton Amateur	1–5	Bedford Town
39	Maidstone United	3–5	Ashford
40	Melksham	3–2	Swindon G W R Corinthians
41	Merthyr Tydfil	5–2	Llanelli
42	Morecambe	0–3	Wigan Athletic
43	Moss Bay	2–3	Milnthorpe Corinthians
44	Murton Colliery Welfare	1–3	Ashington
45	Netherfield	7–2	Frizington United
46	Newport I O W	0–1	Bournemouth Gasworks Athletic
47	Orrell	1–2	Newton Y M C A
48	Ossett Town	0–2	South Kirkby Colliery
49	Parton United	2–4	Cleator Moor Celtic
50	Peasedown Miners Welfare	1–0	Glastonbury
51	Peterborough United	6–0	Wellingborough Town
52	Poole Town	1–0	East Cowes Victoria
53	Portrack Shamrocks	5–1	Hull Amateurs
54	Prescot Cables w/o-scr St Helens Town		
55	Ransome & Marles	3–1	Boots Athletic
56	Rawmarsh Welfare	4–0	Grimethorpe Rovers
57	Romford	3–0	Ekco
58	Salisbury Corinthians	2–2	Gosport Borough Athletic
59	Scunthorpe & Lindsey United	5–2	Harworth Colliery Athletic
60	Selby Town	0–0	Thorne Colliery
61	Sheffield	2–4	Wombwell Athletic
62	Shildon	3–3	Spennymoor United
63	Skelmersdale United	4–3	Leyland Motors
64	Slough United	3–3	Windsor & Eton
65	Southwick	5–3	Horsham
66	St Albans City	5–1	Hertford Town
67	St Philip's Marsh Adult School	2–0	Gloucester City
68	Stalybridge Celtic	4–3	Northwich Victoria
69	Street	2–0	Somerton Amateurs
70	Sutton United	7–0	Metropolitan Police
71	Thornycroft Athletic	1–2	R A O C Hilsea
72	Throckley	2–5	Crook Colliery Welfare
73	Tilbury	4–1	Leyton
74	Trowbridge Town	6–2	Soundwell
75	Uxbridge	2–1	Maidenhead United
76	Vickers Armstrong	1–1	Kingstonian
77	Walton & Hersham	1–1	Tooting & Mitcham United
78	Welton Rovers	2–4	Radstock Town
79	West Auckland Town	0–3	Seaham Colliery Welfare
80	Westbury United	2–1	Pewsey Y M
81	Whitby Albion Rangers	2–6	Whitby
82	Woking	2–6	Wimbledon
83	Wood Green Town	2–4	Finchley
84	Woolwich Polytechnic	0–0	Sheppey United
85	Worcester City	1–1	Moor Green
86	Worthing	3–5	Eastbourne
87	Wycombe Wanderers	3–4	Hayes

=== Replays ===
Tie	Home team	Score	Away team
9	Billingham Synthonia w/o-scr Brigham & Cowan		
10	Denaby United	2–1	Brodsworth Main Colliery
15	Horwich R M I	0–2	Darwen
17	Stourbridge	0–1	Dudley Town
23	Gothic	6–0	Gorleston
58	Gosport Borough Athletic	2–1	Salisbury Corinthians
60	Thorne Colliery	2–1	Selby Town
62	Spennymoor United	4–2	Shildon
64	Windsor & Eton	2–4	Slough United
76	Kingstonian	3–2	Vickers Armstrong
77	Tooting & Mitcham United	2–1	Walton & Hersham
84	Sheppey United	1–3	Woolwich Polytechnic
85	Moor Green	1–6	Worcester City

== 2nd qualifying round ==
=== Ties ===
Tie	Home team	Score	Away team
1	Ashford	1–1	Gravesend & Northfleet
2	Bangor City	4–1	Stalybridge Celtic
3	Barking	3–0	Crittall Athletic
4	Basford United	0–7	Ransome & Marles
5	Bedford Avenue	0–8	Hitchin Town
6	Bognor Regis Town	2–1	Bexhill Town
7	Brandon Colliery Welfare	1–1	Seaham Colliery Welfare
8	Brush Sports	7–0	Gresley Rovers
9	Coalville Town	14–0	Ibstock Penistone Rovers
10	Crook Colliery Welfare	2–1	Consett
11	Earle	0–3	Prescot Cables
12	Finchley	4–2	Hoddesdon Town
13	Grantham	1–2	Boston United
14	Haydock C & B Recreation	1–1	Newton Y M C A
15	Hayes	6–3	Slough United
16	Hereford United	3–0	Worcester City
17	Hoffman Athletic (Stonehouse)	5–1	Melksham
18	King's Lynn	0–2	Cambridge Town
19	Leighton United	2–5	Bedford Town
20	Leiston	3–1	Great Yarmouth Town
21	Lowca	3–3	Cleator Moor Celtic
22	Lowestoft Town	2–5	Gothic
23	Merthyr Tydfil	4–2	Lovells Athletic
24	Netherfield	6–2	Milnthorpe Corinthians
25	Newburn	3–3	Ashington
26	Newmarket Town	0–2	Chatteris Town
27	Nuneaton Borough	2–1	Dudley Town
28	Peasedown Miners Welfare	1–1	Dartmouth United
29	Peterborough United	3–0	Peterborough Westwood Works
30	Poole Town	3–0	Gosport Borough Athletic
31	Portrack Shamrocks	2–1	Billingham Synthonia
32	R A O C Hilsea	2–2	Bournemouth Gasworks Athletic
33	Radstock Town	2–1	Street
34	Rawmarsh Welfare	0–3	Scunthorpe & Lindsey United
35	Rhyl	4–4	Ellesmere Port Town
36	Skelmersdale United	1–1	Chorley
37	South Kirkby Colliery	2–1	Frickley Colliery
38	Southwick	5–5	Eastbourne
39	Spennymoor United	2–0	Ferryhill Athletic
40	St Albans City	2–5	Harrow Town
41	St Philip's Marsh Adult School	1–6	Barry Town
42	Stewarts & Lloyds	1–1	Kettering Town
43	Sutton United	3–1	Kingstonian
44	Tilbury	2–1	Romford
45	Tooting & Mitcham United	1–0	Wimbledon
46	Trowbridge Town	4–0	Westbury United
47	Uxbridge	5–2	Headington United
48	Whitby	0–2	Stockton
49	Wigan Athletic	1–2	Darwen
50	Wombwell Athletic	4–2	Denaby United
51	Woolwich Polytechnic	0–3	Folkestone
52	Yorkshire Amateur	1–0	Thorne Colliery

=== Replays ===
Tie	Home team	Score	Away team
1	Gravesend & Northfleet	3–2	Ashford
7	Seaham Colliery Welfare	2–0	Brandon Colliery Welfare
14	Newton Y M C A	1–3	Haydock C & B Recreation
21	Cleator Moor Celtic	0–5	Lowca
25	Ashington	6–1	Newburn
28	Dartmouth United	3–1	Peasedown Miners Welfare
32	Bournemouth Gasworks Athletic	6–2	R A O C Hilsea
35	Ellesmere Port Town	1–3	Rhyl
36	Chorley	1–1	Skelmersdale United
38	Eastbourne	4–1	Southwick
42	Kettering Town	4–2	Stewarts & Lloyds

=== 2nd replay ===
Tie	Home team	Score	Away team
36	Skelmersdale United	1–0	Chorley

== 3rd qualifying round ==
=== Ties ===
Tie	Home team	Score	Away team
1	Ashington	7–1	Crook Colliery Welfare
2	Bangor City	5–3	Rhyl
3	Barking	3–0	Tilbury
4	Bedford Town	2–2	Hitchin Town
5	Boston United	3–1	Ransome & Marles
6	Brush Sports	4–3	Coalville Town
7	Chatteris Town	1–6	Cambridge Town
8	Eastbourne	4–1	Bognor Regis Town
9	Finchley	4–3	Harrow Town
10	Folkestone	1–2	Gravesend & Northfleet
11	Gothic	4–4	Leiston
12	Hayes	3–2	Uxbridge
13	Hereford United	5–0	Nuneaton Borough
14	Hoffman Athletic (Stonehouse)	3–4	Trowbridge Town
15	Lowca	0–1	Netherfield
16	Merthyr Tydfil	3–0	Barry Town
17	Peterborough United	4–1	Kettering Town
18	Poole Town	4–2	Bournemouth Gasworks Athletic (Declared void)
19	Prescot Cables	2–2	Haydock C & B Recreation
20	Radstock Town	1–3	Dartmouth United
21	Seaham Colliery Welfare	0–4	Spennymoor United
22	Skelmersdale United	1–1	Darwen
23	South Kirkby Colliery	1–2	Yorkshire Amateur
24	Stockton	9–1	Portrack Shamrocks
25	Tooting & Mitcham United	3–5	Sutton United
26	Wombwell Athletic	2–5	Scunthorpe & Lindsey United

=== Replays ===
Tie	Home team	Score	Away team
4	Hitchin Town	3–2	Bedford Town
11	Leiston	0–2	Gothic
18	Bournemouth Gasworks Athletic	2–3	Poole Town
19	Haydock C & B Recreation	1–0	Prescot Cables
22	Darwen	6–4	Skelmersdale United

== 4th qualifying round ==
The teams that entered in this round are: Leytonstone, Shrewsbury Town, Chelmsford City, Cheltenham Town, Colchester United, Lancaster City, Walthamstow Avenue, Guildford City, Gillingham, Dulwich Hamlet, Marine, Bath City, Workington, North Shields, South Bank, South Liverpool, Scarborough, Bromley, Wellington Town, Kidderminster Harriers, Witton Albion, Runcorn, Yeovil Town and Gainsborough Trinity

=== Ties ===
Tie	Home team	Score	Away team
1	Barking	1–4	Leytonstone
2	Brush Sports	5–1	Shrewsbury Town
3	Chelmsford City	0–4	Cambridge Town
4	Cheltenham Town	1–1	Hereford United
5	Colchester United	5–1	Gothic
6	Darwen	2–5	Lancaster City
7	Eastbourne	3–7	Finchley
8	Gravesend & Northfleet	1–0	Walthamstow Avenue
9	Guildford City	1–2	Gillingham
10	Hayes	4–2	Dulwich Hamlet
11	Marine	7–0	Haydock C & B Recreation
12	Merthyr Tydfil	7–1	Bath City
13	Netherfield	1–3	Workington
14	North Shields	1–1	Ashington
15	Peterborough United	4–1	Hitchin Town
16	Poole Town	2–0	Trowbridge Town
17	Scunthorpe & Lindsey United	4–1	Boston United
18	South Bank	0–3	Spennymoor United
19	South Liverpool	2–2	Bangor City
20	Stockton	5–1	Scarborough
21	Sutton United	2–0	Bromley
22	Wellington Town	3–1	Kidderminster Harriers
23	Witton Albion	1–2	Runcorn
24	Yeovil Town	10–2	Dartmouth United
25	Yorkshire Amateur	3–3	Gainsborough Trinity

=== Replays ===
Tie	Home team	Score	Away team
4	Hereford United	3–4	Cheltenham Town
14	Ashington	1–1	North Shields
19	Bangor City	0–4	South Liverpool
25	Gainsborough Trinity	6–2	Yorkshire Amateur

=== 2nd replay ===
Tie	Home team	Score	Away team
14	North Shields	3–1	Ashington

== 1946–47 FA Cup ==
See 1946–47 FA Cup for details of the rounds from the first round proper onwards.
