= Hull Amateurs A.F.C. =

Defunct association football club

Hull Amateurs
- Full name: Hull Amateurs Association Football Club
- Nickname: the Ams
- Founded: 1944
- Dissolved: 1947
- Ground: Hull Cricket Ground
- Chairman: W. H. Banks
- Secretary: N. J. Pogson
Home colours	Change colours

Hull Amateurs A.F.C. was an association football club from Kingston-upon-Hull, active immediately after the Second World War.

== History ==
The club was founded in 1944 by the Hull Cricket Club to provide a first-class amateur football club in Hull, originally under the name The Hull Amateur A.F.C., and the club's chairman W. H. Banks was a director at the cricket club; the adult subscription was set at 35s. to defray the expected annual cost of £550. It joined the Yorkshire Football League for the 1945–46 season and also entered the FA Amateur Cup.

The club's senior record however showed that the cricket club's hopes were too optimistic. The Ams finished bottom of the Yorkshire League in 1945–46, and bottom but one in 1946–47; it only won 12 matches out of 66 in its two seasons. It did reach the semi-final of the East Riding Senior Cup in 1946-47, only losing 2–1 to a Hull City reserve XI which included five regular first-teamers.

The club's Amateur Cup run was a little more successful; it won through three qualifying rounds in 1945–46 but lost 2–1 at Guiseley at the final stage, and the luck of the draw sent them to Guiseley again for its second qualifying tie in 1946–47, this time extra-time being required for Guiseley to win through - the score was 1–1 after 90 minutes and the Ams took an extra-time lead before conceding twice. Perhaps as a result of its mini-run in the Amateur Cup, the club entered the 1946–47 FA Cup qualifying rounds, but lost 5–1 at Portrack Shamrocks at the first stage.

Following the lack of success, the club resigned from the Yorkshire League in June 1947, and appears to have disbanded before the 1947–48 season; it was certainly defunct before the 1948–49 season and its final recorded match was a 4–1 home win over Wombwell Athletic on 14 June to finish its Yorkshire League sojourn.

The name was revived in 1960, when Wheeler Amateurs A.F.C. changed its name to Hull Amateurs; it took part in the Amateur Cup from 1960–61 to 1969–70.

== Colours ==
The club wore green shirts with yellow collar and cuffs, black shorts, and green stockings; its change shirt was blue and yellow.

== Ground ==
The club played at the Hull Cricket Ground in Anlaby Road, which had a separate area used for football before 1944. A fixture backlog in 1946–47 forced the club to use Hull City's Boothferry Park and Goole's Victoria Pleasure Ground for its final few home games, as the cricket club needed the facilities.

== Notable players ==
- Jack Major, who joined Hull Amateurs in 1945 before joining Hull City and Sunderland.
