= South Bank East End F.C. =

- Full name: South Bank East End Football Club
- Founded: 1908
- Dissolved: 1953
- Ground: Majestic Ground
Home colours

South Bank East End F.C. was an association football club from South Bank, Redcar and Cleveland, North Yorkshire.

== History ==
The club was founded in 1908. It was considered a nursery side for Middlesbrough for much of its existence and a number of Boro players cut their teeth with East End.

The club entered the qualifying rounds of the FA Cup from 1920–21 to 1950–51; in its 30 years of entries, it never got beyond the first qualifying round. It came close in 1936–37, holding town rivals South Bank in the first preliminary round, but going down 2–1 in the replay.

It had more success in the FA Amateur Cup, which it entered over the same period, reaching the first round proper (last 64) in 1937–38; at that stage it lost 4–1 at home to Ferryhill Athletic. Its greatest success came at local level, winning numerous amateur competitions at county level, including three Teesside Football League titles before the Second World War, and notably winning 5 trophies in the 1933–34 season alone. It also reached the 1939–40 North Riding Senior Cup final, losing to Portrack Shamrocks at Ayresome Park.

East End was nearly put out of business in 1939, as the local council threatened a compulsory purchase order over its ground; ironically World War 2 saved the club temporarily. It continued playing to the end of the 1952–53 season, but there is no record for it afterwards.

== Colours ==
The club wore black and amber quarters.

== Ground ==
The club's ground, the Majestic Ground, was on Normanby Road.

== Notable players ==
- Harold Shepherdson, more notable as the England national football team assistant coach in the 1966 World Cup triumph; played for the club before joining Middlesbrough in 1933.
- Ray Garbutt, who played for the club in 1946–47 and moved to Manchester City for the following season.
- Four England internationals, Jackie Carr, Bobby Turnbull, George Hardwick, and Micky Fenton, started their careers with the club before moving to Middlesbrough.
- Other former players ( 9 )
