= Teesside Football League =

- Founded: 1891
- Folded: 2017
- Country: England
- Level on pyramid: 11
- Feeder to: Northern League Division One
- Domestic cup(s): Lou Moore Memorial Trophy;R T Raine Trophy and J V Madden Trophy
- League cup: MacMillan Bowl
- Last champions: Boro Rangers (2016–17)
- Most championships: Acklam Steelworks (7)

The Teesside Football League was a football competition based in northern England. Established in 1891, it was dissolved in 2017 when it merged with the Eskvale & Cleveland League to form the North Riding Football League. At the end of its existence the league was placed at level 11 of the English football league system, with clubs being promoted to Division Two of the Northern League.

== History ==
The league was founded in 1891 and was contested every season until 2017, with the exception of the two World Wars. Clubs competed in three cup competitions, the MacMillan Bowl, the R T Raine Trophy and the Lou Moore Memorial Trophy. The R T Raine Trophy is competed by the League Champions and MacMillan Bowl winners from the previous season. From the 2002–03 season onwards, clubs in Division Two competed for the A Burness Plate (with the exception of the 2008–09 season).

== Final member clubs, 2016–17 ==
The final season's championship was contested by 13 teams, though 14 were originally listed. The division was reduced from 16 teams from the previous season.

Team	Ground
Beechwood, Easterside & District Social	Beechwood & Easterside Sports Club, Middlesbrough
Billingham Town Reserves	Bedford Terrace, Billingham
Boro Rangers	Middlesbrough FC Foundation, Middlesbrough
Fishburn Park	Broomfield Park, Whitby
Grangetown Boys Club (not competing)	Grangetown YCC, Middlesbrough
Guisborough Three Fiddles	King George V Playing Fields, Guisborough
Nunthorpe Athletic	Nunthorpe & Marton Recreation Club, Middlesbrough
Redcar Newmarket	Rye Hills School, Redcar
Redcar Town	Mo Mowlam Memorial Park, Redcar
St. Mary's Yarm	Conyers School, Yarm
Staithes Athletic	Staithes Athletic Club, Staithes
Stockton West End	North Shore Health Academy, Stockton
Thornaby Dubliners	Harold Wilson Sports Centre, Thornaby
Whinney Banks Youth & Community Centre	Sandy Flatts, Middlesbrough

== League champions ==
Last title indicated by club name in bold and each entry followed by the number of times that club has won the title at that point.

- 1891–92: Middlesbrough Swifts (1)
- 1892–93: South Bank (1)
- 1893–94: Darlington St. Hilda's (1)
- 1894–95: Middlesbrough Reserves (1)
- 1895–96: Darlington Reserves (1)
- 1896–97: Thornaby (1)
- 1897–98: Thornaby (2)
- 1898–99: Haverton Hill (1)
- 1899–1900: Haverton Hill (2)
- 1900–01: Haverton Hill (3)
- 1901–02: Darlington St. Hilda's (1)
- 1902–03: Thornaby St. Patrick's (1)
- 1903–04: Thornaby St. Patrick's (2)
- 1904–05: South Bank St. Peter's (1)
- 1905–06: Riley Bros (Stockton) (1)
- 1906–07: Thornaby St. Patrick's (3)
- 1907–08: West Hartlepool Expansion (1)
- 1908–09: Skinningrove United (1)
- 1909–10: Eston United (1)
- 1910–11: Thornaby St. Patrick's (4)
- 1911–12: Ashmore, Benson & Pease (1)
- 1912–13: Cleveland Chemical Works (1)
- 1914–18: Not competed for due to World War I
- 1919–20: Haverton Hill (4)
- 1920–21: Blair & Co. (1)
- 1921–22: Stillington St. John's (1)
- 1922–23: West Hartlepool Temp (1)
- 1923–24: Stockton Malleable Institute (1)
- 1924–25: Normanby Magnesite (1)
- 1925–26: Stockton Malleable Institute (2)
- 1926–27: West Hartlepool Peser (1)
- 1927–28: Normanby Magnesite (2)
- 1928–29: West Hartlepool Peser (2)
- 1929–30: West Hartlepool Peser (3)
- 1930–31: South Bank East End (1)
- 1931–32: Normanby Magnesite (2)
- 1932–33: South Bank St. Peter's (2)
- 1933–34: Grangetown St. Mary's (1)
- 1934–35: Lingdale (1)
- 1935–36: Carlin How (1)
- 1936–37: South Bank East End (2)
- 1937–38: South Bank East End (3)
- 1938–39: Cargo Fleet Athletic (1)
- 1939–40: South Bank Athletic (1)
- 1941–46: Not competed for due to World War II
- 1946–47: Port Clarence Sports & Social Club (1)
- 1947–48: Port Clarence Sports & Social Club (2)
- 1948–49: Head Wrightson (1)
- 1949–50: Portrack Shamrocks (1)
- 1950–51: Ashmore Recreation (1)
- 1951–52: Billingham Synthonia Reserves (1)
- 1952–53: Head Wrightson (2)
- 1953–54: Stockton Amateurs (1)
- 1954–55: ICI Wilton (1)
- 1955–56: Portrack Shamrocks (2)
- 1956–57: Redcar Albion (1)
- 1957–58: Redcar Albion (2)
- 1958–59: Redcar Albion (3)
- 1959–60: Cleveland Mines (1)
- 1960–61: Cleveland Mines (1)
- 1961–62: Billingham Synthonia Reserves (2)
- 1962–63: Billingham Synthonia Reserves (3)
- 1963–64: Billingham Synthonia Reserves (4)
- 1964–65: Acklam Steelworks (1)
- 1965–66: Acklam Steelworks (2)
- 1966–67: Head Wrightson (2)
- 1967–68: Head Wrightson (3)
- 1968–69: Head Wrightson (4)
- 1969–70: Whinney Banks (1)
- 1970–71: Winterton Hospital (1)
- 1971–72: Whinney Banks (2)
- 1972–73: Teesside Polytechnic (1)
- 1973–74: Cassel Works (1)
- 1974–75: Hartlepool Boys Welfare Old Boys (1)
- 1975–76: Acklam Steelworks (3)
- 1976–77: Billingham Social Club (1)
- 1977–78: Smith's Dock (1)
- 1978–79: Billingham Social Club (2)
- 1979–80: Smith's Dock (2)
- 1980–81: Marske United (1)
- 1981–82: Hartlepool Athletic (1)
- 1982–83: Hartlepool Athletic (2)
- 1983–84: Marske United (2)
- 1984–85: Hartlepool Boys Welfare Old Boys (2)
- 1985–86: Stockton Town (1)
- 1986–87: New Marske Sports Club (1)
- 1988–89: Hemlington Sports Club (1)
- 1989–90: Nunthorpe Athletic (1)
- 1990–91: ICI Wilton (1)
- 1991–92: Billingham Cassel Mall (1)
- 1992–93: Rowntrees (1)
- 1993–94: Rowntrees (2)
- 1994–95: Tees Components (1)
- 1995–96: Acklam Steelworks (4)
- 1996–97: Acklam Steelworks (5)
- 1997–98: Acklam Steelworks (6)
- 1998–99: Grangetown Boys Club (1)
- 1999–2000: Grangetown Boys Club (2)
- 2000–01: Acklam Steelworks (7)
- 2001–02: Grangetown Boys Club (2)
- 2002–03: Grangetown Boys Club (3)
- 2003–04: Hartlepool (1)
- 2004–05: Carlin How Working Mens Club (2)
- 2005–06: Carlin How Working Mens Club (3)
- 2006–07: Carlin How Working Mens Club (4)
- 2007–08: Beechwood, Easterside & District Social (1)
- 2008–09: Beechwood, Easterside & District Social (2)
- 2009–10: Beechwood, Easterside & District Social (3)
- 2010–11: Grangetown Boys Club (4)
- 2011–12: Richmond Town (1)
- 2012–13: Endeavour (1)
- 2013–14: Whinney Banks Youth & Community Centre (2)
- 2014–15: Whinney Banks Youth & Community Centre (3)
- 2015–16: Boro Rangers (1)
- 2016–17: Boro Rangers (2)

=== Division Two Champions ===
- 2002–03 – SMG Redstripes
- 2003–04 – Dormans
- 2004–05 – Hartlepool Chester Hotel
- 2005–06 – Mackinlay Park
- 2006–07 – Guisborough Quoit
- 2007–08 – Bedale
- 2008–09 – Scarborough Town
- 2009–10 – Coulby Newham
- 2010–11 – Whinney Banks Youth & Community Centre
- 2011–12 – Darlington Rugby Club
- 2012–13 – Lingdale
- 2013–14 – Thirsk Falcons
- 2014–15 – Redcar Town

== MacMillan Bowl winners ==
- Acklam Steelworks (6) - 1968-69; 1976–77; 1995–96; 1996–97; 1997–98; 2013–14
- BEADS FC (2) - 2003-04; 2009–10
- Billingham Synthonia (2) - 1934-35; 1938–39
- Billingham Synthonia Res (4) - 1961-62; 1965–66; 1966–67; 1967-68
- Blackett Hutton Welfare (2) - 1959-60; 1962–63
- Boro Rangers FC (1) - 2015-16
- BSC Redcar (1) - 1994-95
- Cargo Fleet Ironworks (1) - 1936-37
- Carlin How (2) - 2004-05; 2006–07
- Cassell Works (1) - 1960-61
- Endeavour FC (1) - 2012-13
- Grangetown Boys Club (4) - 1963-64; 1999-00; 2000–01; 2002-03
- Grangetown St Mary's (1) - 1932-33
- Grangetown YCC (1) - 2010-11
- Guisborough Quoit FC (1) - 2007-08
- Head Wrightson (3) - 1948-49; 1950–51; 1964–65
- ICI Wilton (2) - 1982-83; 1988–89
- Lingdale Institute (1) - 1930-31
- New Marske SC (1) - 1986-87
- Normanby Magnesite (4) - 1927-28; 1929–30; 1931–32; 1937-38
- North Skelton (2) - 1952-53; 1953–54
- Norton CCT (1) - 1978-79
- Nunthorpe Athletic (5) - 1973-74; 1983–84; 1989–90; 1998–99; 2008–09
- Port Clarence (1) - 1946-47
- Portrack Shamrocks (4) - 1947-48; 1954–55; 1955–56; 1956-57
- Redcar Albion (6) - 1949-50; 1957–58; 1958–59; 1974–75; 1980–81; 1981–82
- Redcar Town (1) - 2014-15
- Richmond Town (1) - 2011-12
- Rowntree's (1) - 1992-93
- Smith's Dock (3) - 1951-52; 1977–78; 1979–80
- South Bank St Peter's (1) - 1933-34
- Stockton Malleable Institute (1) - 1925-26
- Stockton Town (1) - 1985-86
- Tees Comp (2) - 1984-85; 1990–91
- Teesside Polytechnic (2) - 1975-76; 1987–88
- Thornaby Amateurs (1) - 1935-36
- Thornaby FC (1) - 2001-02
- Thornaby YC (3) - 1991-92; 1993–94; 2005–06
- West Hartlepool Peser (2) - 1926-27; 1928–29
- Winterton Hospital (1) - 1969-70
