= North Riding Senior Cup =

- Organiser(s): North Riding County FA
- Founded: 1882; 144 years ago
- Region: North Riding of Yorkshire
- Teams: 19
- Current champions: Yarm & Eaglescliffe (1st title)
- Most championships: Middlesbrough (Note: including "A" and reserve teams.) (55 titles)

The North Riding Senior Cup is the county cup in the North Riding of Yorkshire. It is administered by the North Riding County FA. According to the current rules of the competition, it is open to all clubs whose first affiliation is with the NRCFA. A team having entered an F.A. Competition, (Challenge Cup, Vase or Trophy), in the current season must compete in the Senior Cup. Clubs can be exempt upon payment of a fee. Therefore, the lowest tier for compulsory entry are Northern League Division Two, Northern Counties East Division One or other Leagues of a similar status.

The current holders are Yarm & Eaglescliffe who won the cup for the first time by beating Boro Rangers 4–1 on penalties after the match was a goalless draw in regulation time in the 2025/26 final.

== List of finals ==
The competition was known as the Cleveland Cup between 1881 and 1902. Last win is in bold.

Season	Winners (No')	Score	Runners-up	Ref	Notes
1881–82	Middlesbrough(1)	–	Redcar and Coatham F.C.		
1882–83	Middlesbrough(2)	–	Redcar and Coatham F.C.		
1883–84	Middlesbrough(3)	–	Redcar and Coatham F.C.		
1884–85	Middlesbrough(4)	–	Redcar and Coatham F.C.		
1885–86	Middlesbrough(5)	–	Redcar and Coatham F.C.		
1886–87	Darlington(1)	0–0; 4–1 (replay)	St Augustine's		
1887–88	Middlesbrough(6)	–			
1888–89	St Augustine's(1)	–			
1889–90	Middlesbrough(7)	1–0	Stockton		Played at Linthorpe Road Ground, Midlesbrough
1890–91	Stockton(1)	1–0	Middlesbrough		Played at Victoria Ground, Stockton
1891–92	**Middlesbrough Ironopolis(1)**	1–0	Middlesbrough		Played at Paradise Ground, Middlesbrough. Ironopolis would be dissolved in 1894.
1892–93	Darlington(2)	–			
1893–94	Middlesbrough(8)	–			
1894–95	**Darlington(3)**	–			
1895–96	Middlesbrough(9)	–			
1896–97	Middlesbrough(10)	–	-		
1897–98	South Bank(1)	-	-		
1898–99	Stockton(2)	-	-		
1899–1900	Middlesbrough(11)	-	-		
1900–01	St Augustine's (2)	2–0	Middlesbrough		
1901–02	**St Augustine's (3)**	1–0	South Bank		
1902–03	Middlesbrough(12)	-	-		
1903–04	Middlesbrough(13)	-	-		
1904–05	Middlesbrough(14)	-	-		
1905–06	Stockton(3)	-	-		
1906–07	Middlesbrough(15)	–	South Bank		
1907–08	South Bank(2)	-	-		
1908–09	Scarborough(1)	-	-		
1909–10	South Bank(3)	-	-		
1910–11	South Bank(4)	-	-		
1911–12	Middlesbrough(16)	-	-		
1912–13	Middlesbrough(17)	-	-		
1913–14	Middlesbrough(18)	-	-		
1914–15	Middlesbrough(19)	3–2	Hartlepool United		
1915–19	No competition due to First World War				
1919–20	Middlesbrough(20)	-	-		
1920–21	Middlesbrough(21)	-	-		
1921–22	Middlesbrough(22)	-	-		
1922–23	Middlesbrough(23)	4–2	York City		
1923–24	South Bank(5)	-	-		
1924–25	Stockton(4)	-	-		
1925–26	Stockton(5)	-	-		
1926–27	**Loftus Albion(1)**	-	-		
1927–28	Middlesbrough(24)	-	-		
1928–29	Scarborough(2)	-	-		
1929–30	Middlesbrough(25)	-	-		
1930–31	Middlesbrough(26)	-	-		
1931–32	South Bank(6)	-	-		
1932–33	Middlesbrough(27)	-	-		
1933–34	Middlesbrough(28)	-	-		
1934–35	Middlesbrough(29)	-	-		
1935–36	Middlesbrough(30)	-	-		
1936–37	Middlesbrough(31)	-	-		
1937–38	Middlesbrough(32)	-	-		
1938–39	Scarborough(3)	-	-		
1939–40	**Portrack Shamrocks (1)**	-	South Bank East End	Played at Ayresome Park	
1940–45	No competition due to Second World War				
1945–46	Middlesbrough(33)	-	-		
1947–48	Scarborough(4)	-	-		
1948–49	Middlesbrough	-	-		
1949–50	York City(1)	3–0	Middlesbrough		Played at Ayresome Park 7 April 1950
1950–51	Stockton(6)	-	-		
1951–52	Middlesbrough(35)	-	-		
1952–53	Stockton(7)	-	-		
1953–54	Middlesbrough(36)	-	-		
1954–55	Middlesbrough(37)	1–0	York City		Middlesbrough's goal was scored by Brian Clough
1955–56	Scarborough(5)	-	-		
1956–57	York City(2)	-	Scarborough		
1957–58	Middlesbrough(38)	-	-		
1958–59	Scarborough(6)	-	-		
1959–60	**Stockton(8)**	-	-		
1960–61	Scarborough(7)	-	-		
1961–62	Scarborough(8)	-	-		
1962–63	Middlesbrough(39)	-	-		
1963–64	Middlesbrough(40)	-	-		
1964–65	Whitby Town(1)	-	-		
1965–66	Middlesbrough(41)	-	Scarborough		
1966–67	Billingham Synthonia(1)	-	-		
1967–68	Whitby Town(2)	-	-		
1968–69	Scarborough(9)	-	-		
1969–70	York City(3)	-	Billingham Synthonia n		
1970–71	Middlesbrough(42)	-	-		
1971–72	Billingham Synthonia(2)	-	-		
1972–73	Scarborough(10)	-	-		
1973–74	Scarborough(11)	-	-		
1974–75	Middlesbrough(43)	-	-		
1975–76	Middlesbrough(44)	-	-		
1976–77	Scarborough(12)	1–1; 2–1 (Replay)	Guisborough Town		
1977–78	Scarborough(13)	-	-		
1978–79	**Billingham Synthonia(3)**	-	-		
1979–80	York City(4)	-	Middlesbrough		
1980–81	Scarborough(14)	-	-		
1981–82	Scarborough(15)	-	-		
1982–83	Whitby Town(3)	-	-		
1983–84	**South Bank(7)**	-	-		
1984–85	Scarborough(16)	-	-		
1985–86	York City(5)	1–0	Whitby Town		
1986–87	Scarborough(17)	-	-		
1987–88	York City(6)	-	-		
1988–89	York City(7)	1–0	Stockton		
1989–90	Whitby Town(4)	-	-		
1990–91	Guisborough Town(1)	1–0	South Bank		
1991–92	Scarborough(18)	3–2	Guisborough Town		
1992–93	Guisborough Town(2)	2–0	Rowntrees		
1993–94	Guisborough Town(3)	2–0	Pickering Town		
1994–95	Marske United(1)	5–2	Pickering Town		
1995–96	York City(8)	-	Scarborough		
1996–97	Middlesbrough(45)	3–1	York City		Fabrizio Ravanelli and Paul Merson were among the Middlesbrough scorers
1997–98	Whitby Town(5)	3–0	York City		
1998–99	York City(9)	4–2	Whitby Town		Played at the Turnbull Ground, Whitby
1999–2000	York City(10)	1–0	Scarborough		Played at McCain Stadium, Scarborough on 10 August 2000. York Press headline on match report is misleading - it was a hat trick of final appearances not wins
2000–01	Middlesbrough(46)	2–0	York City		Played on 14 Aug 2001 at Bootham Crescent, York
2001–02	Middlesbrough(47)	4–2	Whitby Town		
2002–03	Middlesbrough(48)	2–1	Scarborough		Played at the McCain Stadium, Scarborough on 23 July 2003
2003–04	**Scarborough(19)**	1–0	Middlesbrough		Played at the McCain Stadium, Scarborough on 24 July 2004; Last title for Scarborough F.C. before they were wound up.
2004–05	Whitby Town(6)	3–1	Middlesbrough		Played at the Turnbull Ground, Whitby
2005–06	York City(11)	3–1	Northallerton Town		
2006–07	Middlesbrough(49)	5–0	Northallerton Town		
2007–08	Middlesbrough(50)	2–0	York City		
2008–09	Middlesbrough(51)	2–0	Stokesley Sports Club		
2009–10	**York City(12)**	2–0	Stokesley Sports Club		
2010–11	Guisborough Town(4)	1–0	Marske United		
2011–12	Middlesbrough(52)	1–0	York City		
2012–13	**Pickering Town(1)**	3–0	Marske United		
2013–14	**Guisborough Town(5)**	1–0	Middlesbrough		
2014–15	Middlesbrough(53)	2–0	Guisborough Town		
2015–16	Middlesbrough(54)	3–1	Guisborough Town		
2016–17	Whitby Town(7)	3–1	Pickering Town		
2017–18	**Middlesbrough(55)**	1–0	Scarborough Athletic		
2018–19	Scarborough Athletic(1)	2–2 (3–2 p)	Marske United		
2019–20	**Marske United(2)**	6–0	Thornaby		
2020–21	No competition due to COVID-19 pandemic				
2021–22	Scarborough Athletic(2)	3–0	Guisborough Town		
2022–23	Scarborough Athletic(3)	4–1	South Park Rangers		
2023–24	**Whitby Town(8)**	5–1	Boro Rangers		
2024–25	**Scarborough Athletic(4)**	2–1	Middlesbrough		
2025–26	**Yarm & Eaglescliffe(1)**	0–0 (4–1 p)	Boro Rangers		

== Winners by total wins ==
Club	Wins	First final won	Last final won
Middlesbrough	55	1881-82	2017-18
Scarborough	19	1908-09	2003-04
York City	12	1949-50	2009-10
Stockton	8	1890-91	1959-60
Whitby Town	8	1964-65	2023-24
South Bank	7	1897-98	1983-84
Guisborough Town	5	1990-91	2013-14
Scarborough Athletic	4	2018-19	2024-25
Darlington	3	1886-87	1894-95
St Augustine's	3	1888-89	1901-02
Billingham Synthonia	3	1966-67	1978-79
Marske United	2	1994-95	2019-20
Middlesbrough Ironopolis	1	1891-92	1891-92
Loftus Albion	1	1926-27	1926-27
Pickering Town	1	2012-13	2012-13
Portrack Shamrocks	1	1939-40	1939-40
Yarm & Eaglescliffe	1	2025-26	2025-26

== Competitions since 2005-06 ==
=== 2005-06 ===
First Preliminary Round

Home	Score	Away
Bedale	1-2	Marske United

Second Preliminary Round

Home	Score	Away
Guisborough Town	0-2	Northallerton Town
Pickering Town	2-0	Whitby Town
Fishburn Park	0-1	Marske United
Richmond Mavericks	2-5	Thornaby
Teesside Athletic	4-1	Grangetown Y C C

Quarter Finals

Home	Score	Away
Marske United	1-0	Thornaby
Northallerton Town	2-1	Pickering Town
Scarborough	5-1	Middlesbrough
York City	5-0	Teesside Athletic

Semi-Finals

Home	Score	Away
Marske United	0-2	Northallerton Town
York City	3-0	Scarborough

Final

2 May 2006
19:45 BST

York City	3-1	Northallerton Town
Alex Rhodes 9'; Neale Holmes 23'; Chas Wrigley 86'		Craig Skelton 79'

Bootham Crescent
Attendance: 429
Referee: P Quinn

=== 2006-07 ===
First Preliminary Round

Home	Score	Away
Bedale	1-5	Teesside Athletic
Grangetown Boys Club	4-1	Fishburn Park

Second Preliminary Round

Home	Score	Away
Thornaby	10-1	Richmond Mavericks
Northallerton Town	3-1	Pickering Town
Grangetown Boys Club	1-3	Guisborough Town
Stokesley Sports Club	2-3	Whitby Town
Marske United	3-2	Teesside Athletic

Quarter Finals

Home	Score	Away
Whitby Town	0-5	Northallerton Town
York City	1-2	Scarborough
Guisborough Town	2-0	Marske United
Middlesbrough	2-1	Thornaby

Semi-Finals

Home	Score	Away
Guisborough Town	0-2	Northallerton Town
Scarborough	0-3	Middlesbrough

Final

24 April 2007
19:45 BST

Middlesbrough	5-0	Northallerton Town
25'; 33'; 43'; 85'; 90'

Billingham Synthonia
Attendance: 300

=== 2007-08 ===
First Preliminary Round

Home	Score	Away
Whinney Banks	2-3	Teesside Athletic
Kirkbymoorside	0-2	Scarborough Athletic
Grangetown Boys Club	2-3	New Marske S C

Second Preliminary Round

Home	Score	Away
Fishburn Park	0-4	Scarborough Athletic
Guisborough Town Black Swan	3-2	Stokesley S C
Pickering Town	2-1	Marske United
New Marske S C	3-4	Whitby Town
Thornaby	1-0	Guisborough Town
Teesside Athletic	3-1	Northallerton Town

Quarter Finals

Home	Score	Away
Thornaby	0-2	Scarborough Athletic
Guisborough Town Black Swan	0-0 (1-4 on pens)	Middlesbrough
York City	3-0	Pickering Town
Teesside Athletic	0-2	Whitby Town

Semi-Finals

Home	Score	Away
Whitby Town	1-2	Middlesbrough
Scarborough Athletic	0-2	York City

Final

19 March 2008
19:45 BST

Middlesbrough	2-0	York City
Jonathon Franks

Bootham Crescent
Attendance: 229

=== 2008-09 ===
First Round

Home	Score	Away
Scarborough Town	1-2	Grangetown Boys Club
Fishburn Park	0-0 (6-7 on pens)	Nunthorpe Athletic
Teesside Athletic	2-0	Kirkbymoorside

Second Round

Home	Score	Away
Guisborough Town	1-1 (4-5 on pens)	Guisborough Town H C
Grangetown B C	1-1 (3-4 on pens)	Markse United
Thornaby	1-3	Northallerton Town
Pickering Town	1-1 (3-4 on pens)	Whitby Town
Stokesley S C	4-3	Scarborough Athletic
Nunthorpe Athletic	1-1 (3-4 on pens)	Teesside Athletic

Quarter Finals

Home	Score	Away
Middlesbrough	5-0	Whitby Town
Stokesley S C	3-0	York City
Northallerton Town	1-2	Teesside Athletic
Guisborough Town H C	0-3	Marske United

Semi-Finals

Home	Score	Away
Middlesbrough	2-0	Marske United
Stokesley S C	3-2	Teesside Athletic

Final

13 May 2009

Middlesbrough	2-0	Stokesley Sports Club

Stokesley Sports Club

=== 2009-10 ===
First Round

Home	Score	Away
Scarborough Town	7-2	New Marske

Second Round

Home	Score	Away
South Bank St Peters	0-2	Kirkbymoorside
Teesside Athletic	3-2	Nunthorpe Athletic
Fishburn Park	1-3	Scarborough Town
Grangetown Boys Club	4-0	Guisborough Town H C

Third Round

Home	Score	Away
Thornaby	1-1 (6-5 on pens)	Grangetown Boys Club
Guisborough Town	3-0	Teesside Athletic
Whitby Town	1-1 (2-3 on pens)	Scarborough Athletic
Marske United	1-1 (3-4 on pens)	Stokesley
Scarborough Town	0-3	Northallerton Town
Kirkbymoorside	1-4	Pickering Town

Quarter Finals

Home	Score	Away
Northallerton Town	3-1	Scarborough Athletic
York City	3-0	Guisborough Town
Stokesley	4-2	Thornaby
Middlesbrough	3-3 (4-3 on pens)	Pickering Town

Semi-Finals

Home	Score	Away
Northallerton Town	3-3 (2-4 on pens)	York City
Stokesley	2-1	Middlesbrough

Final

20 April 2010

Stokesley.	0-2	York City

Stokesley Sports Club

=== 2010-11 ===
Round 1

Date	Home	Score	Away
12 Oct 10	REDCAR ATHLETIC F.C.	0 - 1	PICKERING TOWN COMMUNITY F.C.
08 Jan 11	KIRKBYMOORSIDE F.C.	2 - 2 (4-3 on pens)	NUNTHORPE ATHLETIC F.C.
08 Jan 11	GRANGETOWN BOYS CLUB F.C.	3 - 1	FISHBURN PARK F.C.
13 Oct 10	NORTHALLERTON TOWN F.C.	2 - 2 (1-4 on pens)	MARSKE UNITED F.C.
29 Oct 10	THORNABY F.C.	5 - 9	GUISBOROUGH TOWN F.C.
26 Oct 10	SCARBOROUGH ATHLETIC F.C.	2 - 3	STOKESLEY (Do Not Use) F.C.

Quarter Final

Date	Home	Score	Away
18 Jan 11	MARSKE UNITED F.C.	1 - 1 (4-2 on pens)	GRANGETOWN BOYS CLUB F.C.
18 Jan 11	GUISBOROUGH TOWN F.C.	1 - 0	Middlesbrough FC
19 Jan 11	STOKESLEY F.C.	2 - 1	KIRKBYMOORSIDE F.C.
25 Jan 11	York City FC	2 - 3	PICKERING TOWN COMMUNITY F.C.

Semi Final

Date	Home	Score	Away
01 Mar 11	PICKERING TOWN COMMUNITY F.C.	2 - 3	MARSKE UNITED F.C.
02 Mar 11	STOKESLEY F.C.	1 - 1 (2-4 on pens)	GUISBOROUGH TOWN F.C.

Final

30 March 2011

Guisborough Town F.C.	1-0	Marske United F.C.
Onions 48'

Stokesley Sports Club
Attendance: 600

=== 2011-12 ===
Round 1

Date	Home	Score	Away
8 Oct 11	Grangetown Boys	4-2	Kirbymoorside FC
8 Oct 11	Richmond Town FC	7-1	Fishburn Park FC

Round 2

Date	Home	Score	Away
8 Nov 11	Scarborough Town FC	1-2	Pickering Town Community FC
22 Nov 11	Scarborough AFC	1-5	Guisborough Town FC
5 Nov 11	North Ormesby FC	1-4	Redcar Athletic FC
1 Nov 11	Marske United FC	1-0	Richmond Town FC
9 Nov 11	Northallerton Town FC	2-2 (2-4 on pens)	Stokesley Sports Club FC
15 Nov 11	Thornaby FC	2-2 (4-5 on pens)	Grangetown Boys Club FC

Quarter Finals

Date	Home	Score	Away
18 Jan 12	Stokesley Sports Club FC	0-2	York City F.C.
18 Jan 12	Guisborough Town FC	1-0	Redcar Athletic FC
1 Jan 12	Marske United FC	0-4	Middlesbrough F.C.
24 Jan 12	Grangetown Boys Club FC	4-2	Pickering Town Community FC

Semi-finals

Date	Home	Score	Away
15 Fen 12	Guisborough Town FC	1-2	Middlesbrough F.C.
28 Feb 12	York City F.C.	4-0	Grangetown Boys FC

Final

20 March 2012

Middlesbrough F.C.	1-0	York City F.C.
Reach 45'

Bootham Crescent, York
Attendance: 304

=== 2012-13 ===
Round 1

Date	Home	Score	Away
14 Nov 12	Marske United FC	3-1	Fishburne Park FC
4 Dec 12	Redcar Athletic FC	2-2 (3-2 on pens)	Scarborough Athletic FC
7 Nov 12	Guisborough Town FC	6-2	Stokesley Sports Club FC
3 Nov 12	Grangetown Boys Club FC	2-1	Scarborough Town FC
14 Nov 12	North Ormesby FC	2-4	Northallerton Town FC
30 Oct 12	Pickering Town Community FC	3-2	Thornaby FC

Quarter Finals

Date	Home	Score	Away
12 Feb 13	Middlesbrough FC	1-2	Marske United FC
9 Jan 13	Guisborough Town FC	4-1	Redcar Athletic FC
8 Jan 13	York City FC	3-0	Northallerton Town FC
19 Feb 13	Grangetown Boys Club FC	0-2	Pickering Town Community FC

Semi-finals

Date	Home	Score	Away	Att
5 Mar 13	Pickering Town Community FC	1-1 (4-2 on pens)	Guisborough Town FC	168
27 Feb 13	Marske United FC	2-0	York City FC	146

Final

30 April 2013
19:30 BST

Pickering Town	3 - 0	Marske United
Liam Shepherd 58'; Liam Salt (pen 90); Joe Danby 90+2'

Stokesley Sports Club
Attendance: 439
Referee: Paul Stalker

=== 2013-14 ===
Preliminary Round

Date	Home	Score	Away
19 Oct 13	Redcar Newmarket	3-1	North Ormesby
19 Oct 13	Fishburn Park	2-3	Grangetown Boys Club
19 Oct 13	Dringhouses	5-3	Scarborough Athletic F.C. Res

Round 1

Date	Home	Score	Away
9 Nov 13	Grangetown Boys Club	5-4	Dringhouses
9 Nov 13	Redcar Athletic	3-2	Northallerton Town
16 Nov 13	Richmond Town	3-2	Marske United
19 Nov 13	Redcar Newmarket	1-1 (5-4 pens)	Thornaby
19 Nov 13	Scarborough Athletic F.C. 1st	2-0	Pickering Town Community F.C.
4 Dec 13	Stokesley Sports Club	0-1	Guisborough Town

Quarter finals

Date	Home	Score	Away
25 Jan 14	Richmond Town	3 - 0	York City
18 Jan 14	Redcar Newmarket	4 - 2	Grangetown Boys Club
25 Feb 14	Redcar Athletic	3 - 3 (1-3 on pens)	Middlesbrough FC
28 Jan 14	Scarborough Athletic	1 - 2	Guisborough Town

Semi-finals

Date	Home	Score	Away
05 Mar 14	Guisborough Town	5 - 1	Redcar Newmarket
19 Mar 14	Middlesbrough FC	3 - 1	Richmond Town

Final

30 Apr 2014
19:30 BST

Middlesbrough FC	0 - 1	Guisborough Town FC
	Report	Johnson 32'

Riverside Stadium, Middlesbrough
Attendance: 986
Referee: Stuart Campbell

=== 2014-15 ===
Preliminary Round

Date	Home	Score	Away
4 Oct 14	Fishburn Park	2-1	Redcar Newmarket
4 Oct 14	Whinney Banks YCC	7-3	Northallerton Town Academy
4 Oct 14	Thirsk Falcons	2-4	Grangetown Boys Club

First Round

Date	Home	Score	Away
26 Nov 14	Whinney Banks	3-1	Richmond Town
19 Nov 14	Redcar Athletic	2-0	Grangetown Boys Club
19 Nov 14	Northallerton Town	1-2	Thornaby
12 Nov 14	Fishburn Park	0-5	Marske United
19 Nov 14	Guisborough Town	4-2	Stokesley Sports Club
25 Nov 14	Scarborough Athletic	1-1 (5-3) pens	Pickering Town Community FC

Quarter Finals

Date	Home	Score	Away
13 Jan 15	Redcar Athletic	0-1	York City
28 Jan 15	Guisborough Town	8-2	Whinney Banks YCC
10 Feb 15	Middlesbrough	6-1	Marske United
17 Feb 15	Scarborough Athletic	11-1	Thornaby

Semi Finals

Date	Home	Score	Away
17 Feb 15	York City	1-2	Guisborough Town
31 Mar 15	Middlesbrough	2-1	Scarborough Athletic

Final

Middlesbrough FC	2 - 0	Guisborough Town FC
McCarthy 40'; Fewster 85'

King George V Grounds, Guisborough
Attendance: 449
Referee: Michael Gillespie

=== 2015-16 ===
Note - Number in brackets indicates tier in English football league system for this season.

Preliminary Round

Date	Home	Score	Away
26 Sep 15	Redcar Newmarket (11)	w/o	Thirsk Falcons AFC (11)
24 Oct 15	Grangetown Boys Club (11)	2 - 0	Redcar Town (12)
7 Nov 15	Whinny Banks YCC (11)	3 - 2	Fishburn Park (10)

First Round

Date	Home	Score	Away
21 Oct 15	Northallerton Town (10)	5 - 3	Stokesley Sports Club (10)
9 Dec 15	Guisborough Town (9)	8 - 0	Grangetown Boys Club (11)
25 Nov 15	Scarborough Athletic FC (8)	3 - 0	Richmond Town (11)
8 Dec 15	Thornaby (10)	4 - 3	Whinny Banks YCC (11)
25 Nov 15	Redcar Athletic (11)	3 - 1	Redcar Newmarket (10)
17 Nov 15	Marske United (9)	4 - 1	Pickering Town (9)

Quarter Finals

Date	Home	Score	Away
9 Feb 16	Thornaby (10)	1-1 (pens 4–1)	Redcar Athletic (11)
20 Jan 16	Northallerton Town (10)	1 - 2	Middlesbrough (2)
19 Jan 15	Scarborough Athletic (8)	1 -2	Marske United (9)
9 Feb 16	Guisborough Town (9)	0-0 (pens 4–3)	York City (4)

Semi-finals

23 Mar 16
19:45 GMT

Guisborough Town	2 - 1	Marske United
Earl 38'; Bulmer 56'		Kelly 78'

King George V Ground, Guisborough
Attendance: 338
10 Mar 16

Thornaby	1 - 5	Middlesbrough
Mitchell 29'		Morelli 14', 23', 42', 46'; Kitching 83'

Teesdale Park, Thornaby-on-Tees
Attendance: 220
Referee: Alf Greenwood

Final

9 May 2016
1945 BST

Middlesbrough	3-1	Guisborough Town
Pattison 38'; Jakupovic 45', 69'		Bulmer 61'

King George V Playing Field, Guisborough
Attendance: 440

=== 2016-17 ===
Preliminary Round

15 Oct 16

Fishburn Park	1 - 1	Redcar Town
Penalties
	3 - 4

Broomfield Park, Whitby
Referee: Alan Geddes

First Round

8 Nov 16
20:00 GMT

Scarborough Athletic	1 - 0	Redcar Town

Queensgate, Bridlington
Referee: Benjamin Stones
18 Oct 16
19:30 BST

Marske United	5 - 0	Redcar Newmarket
Jefferson 28' (o.g.); Ramsbottom 70', 78'; Mulligan 74'; Butterworth 80'

GER Stadium, Marske-by-the-Sea
Referee: David Holmes
2 Nov 16
19:30 GMT

Northallerton Town	4 - 1	Thornaby

RGPS Stadium, Northallerton
Referee: George Roberts
30 Nov 16
19:45 GMT

Guisborough Town	0 - 5	Whitby Town
		Fryatt 9', 43'; Hopson 40', 50', 60' (pen.)

King George V Ground, Guisborough
Attendance: 222
Referee: Ross Joyce
30 Nov 16
19:30 GMT

Stokesley Sports Club	1 - 4	Richmond Town

Stokesley Sports Ground, Stokesley
Referee: Stuart Campbell
29 Nov 16
19:45 GMT

Pickering Town Community	3 - 0	Redcar Athletic
Danby 4'; Birch 18'; 52'

Mill Lane, Pickering
Referee: Matthew Diciccio

Quarter Finals

25 Jan 2017
1945 GMT

Richmond Town	0 - 2	Scarborough Athletic

Earl's Orchard, Richmond
10 Jan 2017
19:30 GMT

Middlesbrough U21/Res	4 - 0	Northallerton Town

Billingham Synthonia FC
Referee: Christopher Keightley
10 Jan 2017
19:45 GMT

Pickering Town Community	4 - 1	Marske United

Mill Lane, Pickering
Referee: David Holmes
10 Jan 2107
19:45 GMT

Whitby Town	3 - 1	York City
Snaith 5'; Bythway 50'; Carson		Oliver 51'

The Turnbull Ground, Whitby
Attendance: 328
Referee: Matthew Dicicco

Semi-finals

14 Feb 2017
19:45 GMT

Pickering Town Community	1 - 0	Scarborough Athletic
Kamara 76'

Mill Lane, Pickering
Attendance: 338
Referee: Christopher Keightley
23 Mar 2017
19:45 GMT

Whitby Town	4 - 3	Middlesbrough U21/Res
Roberts 44'; Bythway 48', 60', 69'		McGoldrick 36'; O'Neill 56'; Fewster 72'

The Turnbull Ground, Whitby
Attendance: 336
Referee: Alf Greenwood

Final

15 May 2017
19:30 BST

Whitby Town	3 - 1	Pickering Town Community
Hopson 53'; Roberts 69', 71'		Thompson 32'

Riverside Stadium, Middlesbrough
Attendance: 1,487
Referee: Nicholas Hawksby

=== 2017-18 ===
Preliminary Round

18 Oct 2017
19:00 BST

Grangetown Boys Club	1 - 2	Guisborough United

Grangetown YCC Broadway, Grangetown
Referee: Alan Geddes
4 Nov 2017
14:00 GMT

Redcar Newmarket	0 - 5	Redcar Town

Rye Hills School, Redcar Lane, Redcar
Referee: David Jarvis
1 Nov 2017
19:30 GMT

Redcar Athletic	2 - 0	Stokesley Sports Club

Redcar Athletic FC, Green Lane,Redcar
Referee: Geoffrey Mann
30 Oct 2017
19:30 GMT

Richmond Town	0 - 7	Boro Rangers

Earls Orchard, Richmond
Referee: Liam Powell

First Round

5 Dec 2017
19:30 GMT

Pickering Town Community FC	3 - 1	Redcar Town
Danby 62'; Gray 70'; Mulhearn 90+5'		Weatherald

Mill Lane, Pickering
Referee: George Roberts
20 Dec 2017
19:45 GMT

Northallerton Town	5 - 0	Fishburn Town

The Calvert Stadium, Northallerton
Referee: Conor Ledgeway
6 Dec 2017
19:45 GMT

Guisborough Town	1 - 2	Boro Rangers

King George V Ground, Guisborough
Referee: Jonathan Gill
12 Dec 2017
19:45 GMT

Scarborough Athletic	2 - 0	Marske United

Attendance: 260
Referee: Matthew East
6 Dec 2017
19:45 GMT

Guisborough United	0 - 0 (a.e.t.)	Thornaby
Penalties
	1 -2

6 Dec 2017
19:45 GMT

Redcar Athletic	1 - 0	Whitby Town
Rivis 33'

Green Lane, Redcar
Referee: David Holmes

Quarter-finals

20 Jan 2018
19:30 GMT

York City	2 - 1	Boro Rangers
Thompson 14'; Keenan 76' (o.g.)		Liddell 43'

Bootham Crescent, York
Attendance: 228
Referee: Matthew East
23 January 2018
19:45 GMT

Scarborough Athletic	2 - 1	Pickering Town Community
Stimpson 47'; Wright 52'		Dean (OG) 32'

Flamingo Land Stadium, Scarborough
Attendance: 1,082
Referee: Christopher Keightley
31 Jan 2018
19:30 GMT

Northallerton Town	1 - 1	Thornaby
James 89'		Martin 21'
Penalties
	2 - 4

Calvert Stadium, Northallerton
Referee: George Roberts
8 Feb 2018
19:30 GMT

Middlesbrough U23/Res	7 - 0	Redcar Athletic
Reading 7'; O'Neill 14', 62'; Walker 31', 38', 60'; Brahii 75'

Green Lane, Redcar
Attendance: 300
Referee: Ross Joyce

Semi-finals

6 Mar 2018
19:00 GMT

York City	3 - 3	Middlesbrough U23/Res
Kamdjo 66'; Thompson 82'; Elsdon 85' (o.g.)		Soisalo 45'; Wearne 77'; Walker 90+4' (pen.)
Penalties
	0 - 3

Bootham Crescent, York
Attendance: 151
Referee: Dane Mccarrick
14 Mar 2018
19:45 GMT

Thornaby	0 - 7	Scarborough Athletic
		Coulson 18'; Wright 23'; Walshaw 32', 35', 65'; White 40'; Valentine 45'

Teesdale Park, Thornaby
Attendance: 281
Referee: James Unwin

Final

16 May 2018
19:30 BST

Middlesbrough U23/Res	1 - 0	Scarborough Athletic
Armstrong 60'		Hewitt (red card) 55'

Riverside Stadium, Middlesbrough
Attendance: 1,019
Referee: Christopher Keightley

=== 2018-19 ===
Preliminary Round

24 Oct 2018
19:45 BST

St Mary's 1947	1 - 1	Grangetown Boys Club
Penalties
	7-8

Herlingshaw Centre
Referee: Liam Smith
24 Oct 2018
19:30 GMT

Boro Rangers	3 - 2	Richmond Town

Referee: Jonathon Gill

First Round

20 Nov 2018
19:45 GMT

Middlesbrough u23/Reserves	1 - 0	Pickering Town Community

Referee: David Holmes
24 Oct 2018
19:30 BST

Fishburn Park	2 - 5	Thornaby

Referee: David Avent
6 Nov 2018
19:45 GMT

Redcar Town	0 - 5	Scarborough Athletic

Attendance: 172
Referee: Conor Ledgeway
7 Nov 2018
19:30 GMT

Northallerton Town	0 - 4	York City
		Wright 32'; Jones 48' (o.g.)Kempster 52'; York 64'

Attendance: 267
Referee: Thomas Ross
28 Nov 18
19:30 GMT

Boro Ranger	0 - 3	Redcar Athletic
		Calvert; Browne 64'; Carmichael 80'

Attendance: 79
23 Oct 2018
19:45 BST

Redcar Newmarket	1 - 5	Marske United
Dowse 64' (pen.)		Brockbank 10'; Waters 14'; Stevens 54', 86'; Owens 90'

Attendance: 96
Referee: Geoffrey Mann
20 Nov 2018
19:45 BST

Whitby Town	6 - 1	Grangetown Boys Club
Maloney 13'; Rutherford 37', 51', 75'; Hopson 48'; Coffey 73'		Cooper 45'

Attendance: 223
Referee: Connor Ledgeway
28 Nov 2018
19:45 BST

Stokesley Sports Club	1 - 2	Guisborough Town
79'		Wood 16'; Bythway 65'

Referee: Timothy Craig

Quarter-finals

22 Jan 2019
19:45 GMT

Scarborough Athletic	2 - 1	Guisborough Town
Forrester 4'; Coulson 60'		Robinson 30' ((pen))

Attendance: 423
Referee: Matthew East
15 Jan 2019
19:45 GMT

Marske United	3 - 1	Thornaby

Attendance: 237
Referee: Matthew East
29 Dec 2018
GMT

Whitby Town	0 - 1	Middlesbrough u23/Reserves
		Walker 26'

Attendance: 221
Referee: Samuel Packer
15 Jan 2019
19:30 GMT

York City	6 - 1	Redcar Athletic
Parkin 7'; Griffiths 10'; Tait; Agnew 49' (red card) 82'; Langstaff 88'; Kempster 90'		Browne 51'

Attendance: 352
Referee: Jonathon Gill

Semi-finals

5 Mar 2019
19:45 GMT

Scarborough Athletic	0 - 0 (a.e.t.)	York City
Penalties
Walshaw (penalty scored); Brooksby (penalty scored); Killock (penalty scored)	3 - 0

Attendance: 1,608
Referee: Samuel Packer
12 Mar 2019
19:45 GMT

Middlesbrough u23/Reserves	1 - 3	Marske United
Fletcher 25'		Fairley 52'; Gott 73' (pen.); Butterworth 77'

Mount Pleasant, Marske
Attendance: 304
Referee: Christopher Keightley

Final

2 May 2019
19:30 BST

Scarborough Athletic	2 - 2	Marske United
Walshaw 41'; Coulson 62'		Owens 26'; Gott 73'
Penalties
	3-2	Butterworth (penalty missed); Waters (penalty scored); Dean (penalty missed); Martin (penalty scored)

Riverside Stadium, Middlesbrough
Attendance: 1,502
Referee: James Unwin

=== 2019-20 ===
Preliminary Round

2 Oct 2019
19:30 BST

Redcar Town	0 - 2	Staithes Athletic
		Calvert; Thompson (pen.)

Mo Mowlam Memorial Park, Redcar
Referee: Liam Smith
16 Oct 2019
19:45 BST

Richmond Town	0 - 1	Boro Rangers
		Lockwood 65'

Northallerton Town Football Club, Ainderby Road, Romanby, Northallerton
Referee: Christopher Proffit
23 Oct 2019
19:30 BST

Yarm & Eaglescliffe	2 - 1	Fishburn Park
Jenkinson; Darby
Penalties
	7 - 6

Referee: Alan Geddes
23 Oct 2019
19:30 BST

Grangetown Boys Club	1 - 1	Stokesley Sports Club

Referee: Richard Brine

First round

13 Nov 2019
19:30 GMT

Yarm & Eaglescliffe	2 - 1	Grangetown Boys Club
Forster; Tiff

Referee: Dean Whitwell
26 Nov 2019
19:45 GMT

Staithes Athletic	0 - 7	Scarborough Athletic
		Walshaw; Coulson; Thomson

Referee: Vladimir Mollov
18 Jan 2020
15:00 GMT

Redcar Athletic	5 - 1	St Mary's 1947
Smith (pen.); Wood; Rivis; Jackson		Scott

Referee: Jonathan Gill
19 Nov 2019
19:45 GMT

Redcar Newmarket	0 - 6	Whitby Town
		Bythway 14' (pen.); Weledji 22'; Bell 38'; Roper 45'; Wearmouth 51'; Rutherford 78'

Attendance: 192
Referee: Antony Turner
4 Dec 2019
19:15 GMT

Middlesbrough U23/Res	4 - 1	Boro Rangers
Wearne; Jones; Malley; Burrell		Blake

Referee: Dane McCarrick
19 Nov 2019
19:30 GMT

Thornaby	2 - 0	Guisborough Town
Wheatley 7'; Preston 50'

Attendance: 140
Referee: Leonard Thurlow
19 Nov 2019
19:30 GMT

York City	5 - 0	Pickering Town
Langstaff (?) 50'; Dyer 36'; Maguire 60'; Harrison 70'

Attendance: 256
Referee: Matthew East
11 Dec 2019
19:30 GMT

Northallerton Town	0 - 8	Marske United
		Gott 20', 55', 60' Johnson 34'; Waters 37'; Round 43'; Martin 50'

Referee: Geoffrey Mann

Quarter-final

11 Feb 2020
19:45 GMT

Scarborough Athletic	3 - 0	Redcar Athletic
Watson; Walshaw

Attendance: 347
21 Jan 2020
19:30 GMT

Thornaby	3 - 2	Yarm & Eaglescliffe
Preston 75' 83' (pen.); Jackson 90'		Jenkinson 29'; Mackin 44'

Attendance: 85
Referee: George Roberts
28 Jan 2020
19:45 GMT

Marske United	1 - 0	Middlesbrough U23s
Round 9'

Mount Pleasant, Marske
Attendance: 378
Referee: Davis Holmes
28 Jan 2020
19:45 GMT

Whitby Town	2 - 2 (a.e.t.)	York City
Blackett 65'; Weledji 90+5'		King 9'; Maguire 45'
Penalties
Blackett (penalty scored); Patton (penalty scored); Sukar (penalty missed); Rowe (penalty scored); Horwood (penalty missed)	3 - 4	Allan (penalty missed); King (penalty scored); Jackson W (penalty scored); Harrison (penalty scored); Jackson D (penalty scored)

Attendance: 363
Referee: Samuel Packer

Semi-finals

N/A
19:30 BST

York City	w/o (away team)	Thornaby

Referee: Leonard Thurlow
13 Aug 2020
19:45 BST

Marske United	3 - 1	Scarborough Athletic
Butterworth 35' 75'; Boyes 45'		Cartman 90+3'

Mount Pleasant, Marske
Referee: Jonathon Gill

Final

25 Aug 2020
19:45 BST

Thornaby	0 - 6	Marske United
		Tymon 22' 26' 80'; Boyes 33' 50'; Gott 62'

Teesdale Park, Thornaby
Referee: Ross Joyce

=== 2020-21 ===
Preliminary Round

24 Oct 20
14:00 BST

Grangetown Boys Club	2 - 0	Staithes Athletic

Referee: Richard Brine
28 Oct 20
18:30 GMT

St Mary's 1947	0 - 2	Redcar Town

Referee: Jack Evans
28 Oct 20
19:30 GMT

Boro Rangers	3 - 2	Yarm & Eaglescliffe

Referee: Vladimir Mollov
31 Oct 20
14:00 GMT

Fishburn Park	1 - 3	Richmond Town

Referee: Leonard Thurlow
4 Nov 20
19:30 GMT

Stokesley Sports Club	1 - 2	Kader

Referee: Simos Gerasimou

First Round

31 Jan 21
14:00 GMT

Marske United	-	Boro Rangers

31 Jan 21
14:00 GMT

Thornaby	-	Scarborough Athletic

31 Jan 21
14:00 GMT

Pickering Town	-	York City

31 Jan 21
14:00 GMT

Redcar Town	-	Northallerton Town

31 Jan 21
14:00 GMT

Whitby Town	-	Middlesbrough U23/Res

31 Jan 21
14:00 GMT

Richmond Town	-	Guisborough Town

31 Jan 21
14:00 GMT

Redcar Athletic	-	Grangetown Boys Club

TBC

Kader	-	Redcar Newmarket

Competition Cancelled After Preliminary Round

=== 2021-22 ===
First Round

30 Oct 21
14:00 BST

Kader	4 - 1	Fishburn Park

Outwood Academy Acklam
Acklam, Middlesbrough
Referee: Kevin Blackburn
27 Oct 21
19:00 BST

Yarm & Eaglescliffe	1 - 1	St Mary's 1947
Penalties
	2-4

Conyer's School
Referee: Christopher Barley
27 Oct 21
19:30 BST

Boro Rangers	3 - 0	Richmond Town

Referee: Harvey Websdale
26 Oct 21
19:30 BST

Stokesley Sports Club	2 - 2	Staithes Athletic
Penalties
	5-3

Stokesley Sports Club, Stokesley
Referee: Daniel Todd
23 Oct 21
14:00 BST

Grangetown Boys Club	2 - 2	Redcar Newmarket
Penalties
	4–3

Grange Farm Road, Middlesbrough
Referee: Alexander Bourner

Second Round

17 Nov 21
19:30 GMT

Kader	3 – 3	Redcar Athletic
Penalties
	1–4

Outwood Academy Acklam
Acklam, Middlesbrough
Referee: Andrew Rice
24 Nov 21
19:45 GMT

Guisborough Town	1 – 1	Middlesbrough U23
Bartliff	Match report	Balde 76'
Penalties
	4–3

King George V Ground, Guisborough
Attendance: 314
Referee: Geoffrey Mann
30 Nov 21
19:45 GMT

Redcar Town	2 – 6	Scarborough Athletic
Ord 29'; Clark 71'		Cartman (pen.); Colville; Plant 67'; Day 81'

Mo Mowlam Memorial Park, Redcar
Referee: Samuel Packer
8 Dec 21
19:30 GMT

Northallerton Town	1 – 1	Boro Rangers
Mitchell 76'		Rose 21'
Penalties
	3–4

The Calvert Stadium, Northallerton
Referee: Craig Atkin
15 Dec 21
19:45 GMT

St. Mary's 1947	0 – 3	Marske United
		Clark 58'; Gott 69' (pen.); Fairley 72'

Mount Pleasant, Marske-by-the-Sea
Attendance: 246
Referee: Timothy Craig
11 Jan 22
19:45 GMT

Whitby Town	4 – 1	York City
Campbell 7' (o.g.); Hazel 58'; Shepherd 86'; Griffiths 87'		Heaney 69'

Turnbull Ground, Whitby
Attendance: 361
Referee: David Holmes
17 Nov 21
19:30 GMT

Grangetown Boys Club	2 – 1	Stokesley Sports Club

Grange Farm Road, Middlesbrough
Referee: Richard Brine
30 Nov 21
19:45 GMT

Pickering Town	8–2	Thornaby
Johnson 17', 27', 39'; Logan 53', 59'; Joynes 69'; Keïta 81'; Barker 84'		Beddow 8', 82' (pen))

Mill Lane, Pickering
Referee: Matthew East

Quarter-final

22 Feb 22
19:45 GMT

Scarborough Athletic	1–0	Whitby Town
Day 87'

Flamingo Land Stadium, Scarborough
Attendance: 1,066
Referee: Jonathan Gill
26 Jan 22
19:30 GMT

Grangetown Boys Club	1–3	Redcar Athletic
Dickinson 10'		Rivis 21'; Williams 44'; Walker

Referee: Jonathan Gill
25 Jan 22
19:45 GMT

Pickering Town	3–4	Guisborough Town
Logan 14'; Ferreira 52'; Sanyang 69'		Bartliff 28'; Dillon 62'; Smithyman 85'; Webster 90'; Marshall (red card) 80'

Pickering Town Recreation Club, Pickering
Attendance: 97
Referee: Timothy Craig
25 Jan 22
19:45 GMT

Marske United	2–0	Boro Rangers
May; Mondal 80'

Mount Pleasant Avenue, Marske-by-the-Sea
Attendance: 375
Referee: Matthew East

Semi-finals

30 Mar 22
19:45 GMT

Guisborough Town	1–0	Marske United
Wright-Simpson 78'

King George V Stadium, Guisborough
Attendance: 626
Referee: Liam Smith
22 Mar 22
19:30 GMT

Redcar Athletic	1–3	Scarborough Athletic
Walker 32'		Colville 58'; Cadman 68'; Day 81'

Attendance: 361
Referee: Matthew Dicicco

Final

4 May 22
19:30 BST

Guisborough Town	0–3	Scarbrough Athletic
	Report	Plant 54'; Jarvis 71'; Watson 90'

York Community Stadium
Attendance: 1387
Referee: Samuel Packer

=== 2022-23 ===
First Round

26 Oct 22
19:30 BST

Grangetown Boys Club	1–2	South Park Rangers
36'		Oddy 45'; Melvin 86'

Grange Farm Road, Middlesbrough
Referee: Leonard Thurlow
12 Oct 22
19:30 BST

Yarm & Eaglescliffe	1–3	Redcar Newmarket
Jenkinson 57'		Duffield 12'; Clavert 22', 30'

Billingham Town FC, Bedford Terrace, Billingham
Referee: George Guilfoyle
TBC

Richmond Town	5–2	Kader
Gardner 26', 34'; Nicholas 39'; Pickersgill 55'		3' (o.g.); 79'

Earls Orchard, Richmond
18 Oct 22
20:00 BST

Fishburn Park	4–1	St Marys 1947

Eskdale School, Whitby
Referee: James Gerring

Second Round

26 Oct 22
19:30 BST

Whitby Town	2–0	York City
Fewster 18', 58'

Turnbull Ground, Whitby
Referee: Macauley Gibson
12 Oct 22
19:45 BST

Scarborough Athletic	4–1	Middlsbrough U23/Res
Plant 10', 75'; Tear 58'; Maloney 85'		Bridge 41'

Flamingo Land Stadium, Scarborough
Attendance: 524
Referee: Liam Smith
16 Nov 22
19:30 UTC

Northallerton Town	2–0	Pickering Town
Rae 64'; Waters 74'

The Calvert Stadium, Northallerton
Attendance: 148
Referee: George Roberts
16 Nov 22
19:30 UTC

Fishburn Park	2–2	Boro Rangers
		James; Lofts
Penalties
	3–4

Turnbull Ground, Whitby
Referee: Jason Payne
21 Dec 22
19:30 UTC

Thornaby	4–1	Redcar Newmarket
Croft 3'; Roberts 8' (pen.); Hindson 40'; Proctor 70'		Dickinson 22' (pen.)

Teesdale Park, Thornaby
Referee: Craig Atkin
23 Nov 22
19:30 UTC

Guisborough Town	5–1	Richmond Town
McGee 40', 76', 79'; Kiernan 71'; Miller 90'		Lewington 90+2'

King George V Ground, Guisborough
Attendance: 127
Referee: Andrew Rice
15 Nov 22
19:30 UTC

Redcar Town	2–2	Redcar Athletic
Howes 11'; Dixon 89'		Dale 51'; Walker 90+4' (pen.)
Penalties
Weatherald (penalty scored); Williams (penalty scored); Bennett (penalty missed); Elcoate (penalty scored); Dixon (penalty scored)	4–3	Bell (penalty scored); Norton (penalty missed); Walker (penalty scored); Garbutt (penalty missed); Clarkson (penalty scored)

Mo Mowlam Memorial Park, Redcar
Referee: Jonathan Gill
30 Nov 22
19:45 UTC

Marske United	2–2	South Park Rangers
Potts 19'; Chimalilo 21'		Benomran 6', 33'
Penalties
Boyes (penalty scored); Potts (penalty scored); Green (penalty scored); Kennedy (penalty scored); Chilmalilo (penalty scored); Smith (penalty scored); Sikora (penalty scored); May (penalty missed); Storey (penalty missed)	7–8	Penalty scored Penalty missed

Mount Pleasant Avenue, Marske-by-the-Sea
Referee: Alexander Bourner

Quarter-finals

8 Feb 23
19:30 UTC

Northallerton Town	3–5	South Park Rangers
Parker 8'; 46'; Stephenson 70'		Buchan; Tatt; Brookbanks; Hamo

Attendance: 125
Referee: George Smith
21 Dec 22
19:45 UTC

Boro Rangers	1–1	Whitby Town
Lofts 16' (pen.)		Keenan 19' (o.g.)
Penalties
Turner (penalty scored); Blake C (penalty scored); Blake P (penalty scored); Rouse (penalty scored)	4–2	Day (penalty scored); Hawkins (penalty missed); Fewster (penalty scored); Bramwell (penalty missed)

Stokesley Sports Club
Referee: David Holmes
24 Jan 23
19:30 UTC

Redcar Town	1–5	Guisborough Town
Howes 1'		Bartliff 22'; Blackford 42', 60'; Lieran 48'; McGee 80'

Referee: Matthew East
24 Jan 23
19:45 UTC

Scarborough Athletic	4–2	Thornaby
Ilesanmi 25'; McGuckin 43'; Charles 51', 77'		Mitchell 44'; Verity 83' (pen.)

Flamingo Land Stadium, Scarborough, North Yorkshire
Attendance: 479
Referee: Vladimir Mollov

Semi-finals

8 Mar 23
19:30 UTC

South Park Rangers	2–1	Guisborough Town
Tattersfield 87', 89'		McGee 11'

King George V Ground, Guisborough
Attendance: 203
Referee: Jonathan Gill
7 Mar 23
19:45 UTC

Boro Rangers	1–2	Scarborough Athletic
Rose 30'		Charles 21', 78'

Stokesley Sports Club, Stokesley
Attendance: 220
Referee: Liam Smith

Final

26 Apr 23
19:45 BST

Scarborough Athletic	4 – 1	South Park Rangers
Tear 34'; Charles 38'; Leach 67'; Weledji 84'		O'Brien 30'

York Community Stadium, York
Attendance: 563
Referee: David Holmes

=== 2023-24 ===
First Round

3 Oct 23
19:30 BST

Fishburn Park	5–1	Kader

Referee: Macauley Gibson
7 Oct 23
14:30 BST

Richmond Town	3–2	Grangetown Boys Club
Coatsworth; Ryan		Brookbanks; Hunter

Referee: Mark Purvis
18 Oct 23
19:30 BST

St Mary's 1947	2–3	Cleveland Seniors
Melvin 13', 83'		Garbutt 10', 19', 21'

Referee: Geoffrey Mann

Second Round

6 Feb 24
19:45 BST

Whitby Town	3-1	Northallerton Town
Fewster 23', 90', 90+1'		Stayman-Colin 83'

Attendance: 191
Referee: James Gerring
22 Nov 23
19:30 BST

Cleveland Seniors	1–2	Richmond Town
76'		Lewington 6' 43' (pen.)

Referee: Anthony Duffy
10 Oct 23
19:45 BST

Middlesbrough U21	1–1	Scarborough Athletic
Howells 3'		Green 66'
Penalties
Bridge (penalty scored); John (penalty scored); Nukrumah (penalty scored); Simpson (penalty scored); Samuels (penalty scored); Lindo (penalty scored); Howells (penalty scored); Bilongo (penalty missed); Myers-Smith (penalty missed)	7−8	Mulhern (penalty missed); Maloney (penalty scored); Weledji (penalty scored); Green (penalty scored); Coulson (penalty scored); Barnes (penalty scored); Durose (penalty scored); Brown (penalty scored); Purver (penalty scored)

Attendance: 257
Referee: David Holmes
17 Oct 23
19:30 BST

Redcar Athletic	4–0	Thornaby
Sayer 66'; Walker 81', 90+4'; Holdsworth 90+2'

BM Bi Fold Stadium, Green Lane, Redcar
Attendance: 171
Referee: Alexander Bourner
1 Nov 23
19:45 UTC

Guisborough Town	3–2	York City
Coleman 37'; Cummins 64'; Nelson 86'	Report]	Hancox 51' siziba 76'

King George V Ground, Guisborough
Attendance: 286
Referee: Matthew Dicicco
21 Nov 23
19:45 UTC

Pickering Town	5–2	Fishburn Park
Sanyang 46' 58'; Brooksby 61'; Dyer 77' (o.g.)		Warrilow 52'; Brown 72'

Referee: George Guilfoyle
6 Dec 23
19:30 UTC

Redcar Town	2–3	Boro Rangers
Prest 15'; Lee 23'		Guy 40'; Rose 70', 87'

Referee: James Gerring
21 Nov 23
19:30 UTC

Yarm & Eaglescliffe	4–5	Marske United
Lawrence 28'; Larkin 38' (pen.); Haani 45'; Atkinson 65'		Robertson 3'; Boyes 16' 33'; Chimallo 35'; Church 55'

Billingham Town FC
Referee: Craig Atkin

Quarter-finals

13 Feb 24
19:45 UTC

Guisborough Town	1–1	Scarborough Athletic
Fielding 32'	Report	Mulhern 39, pen'
Penalties
Martin (penalty missed); Blackburn (penalty scored); Tymon (penalty scored); Frazer (penalty missed); Bailey (penalty scored)	3-2	Rutledge (penalty scored); Maloney (penalty missed); Mulhern (penalty scored); Weledji (penalty missed); Colville (penalty missed)

King George V Stadium, Guisborough
Attendance: 409
Referee: David Holmes

Marske United	Away Walkover	Whitby Town

20 Feb 24
19:30 UTC

Redcar Athletic	1-0	Richmond Town
Anderson 13'

Green Lane, Redcar
Referee: Harvey Websdale
20 Jan 24
19:30

Boro Rangers	1–0	Pickering Town
Burns

Attendance: 111
Referee: George Roberts
Semi-finals
12 Mar 24
19:45

Guisborough Town	1–1	Whitby Town
Rowe 62'	Report	Tymon 78'
Penalties
Picket (penalty missed); Smith (penalty scored); Tymon (penalty scored); Dean (penalty missed)	2-4	Walker (penalty scored); Wheatley (penalty scored); Gratton (penalty missed); Fewster (penalty scored); Shepherd (penalty scored)

King George V Stadium, Guisborough
Attendance: 761
Referee: Matthew Dicicco
26 Mar 24
19:30

Redcar Athletic	0–5	Boro Rangers
		Rose 45', 61', 66'; Hickman 47'; Thompson 52'

BM Bi Fold Stadium, Green Lane, Redcar, Redcar
Attendance: 424
Referee: Matthew East

Final

13 May 2024
19:30 BST

Boro Rangers	1–5	Whitby Town
Wetherald 32'		Walker 3', 31', 80'; Doherty 48'; Thomas 76'

Riverside Stadium, Middlesbrough
Attendance: 1,516
Referee: Liam Smith

=== 2024/25 ===
First round

18 Sep 24
19:00 BST

T.I.B.S	1–0	St Mary's 1947
Gray

MFC Foundation Herlingshaw Centre
Referee: Harvey Websdale
23 Oct 24
19:30 BST

Fishburn Park	3–0	Richmond Town
Warrilow; Smith; Storr

Turnbull Ground
Referee: George Roberts

Second round

27 Nov 24
19:30 UTC

T.I.B.S.	2–2	York City
65'; 82'		Day 20'; Farrar 78'
Penalties
Penalty scored	4–3	Grumley (penalty scored); Tate (penalty scored); Day (penalty missed); Farrar (penalty scored) (penalty missed)

Teesdale Park, Thornaby
Referee: Matthew East
18 Dec 24
19:45 UTC

Guisborough Town	3–1	Pickering Town
Pickett 17'; Howes 24', 71'		Silburn 37'

KGV Stadium, Guisborough
Attendance: 147
Referee: James Gerring
19 Nov 24
19:45 UTC

Marske United	0–1	Middlesbrough U21/Res

29 Oct 24
19:30 UTC

Yarm & Eaglescliffe	2–2	Redcar Town
Chessebrough 26'; Conway 55'		23' (o.g.); Williams-Muthana 85'
Penalties
	0–3

Referee: Euan Sadler
17 Dec 24
19:30 UTC

Fishburn Park	1–5	Boro Rangers
Warrilow 51'		Guy 37'; Rose 49'; Burns

Phoenix Park, Middlesbrough
Referee: Thomas Shepherdson
27 Nov 24
19:45 UTC

Great Ayton	1–0	Whitby Town
Reeves 77'

Referee: Anthony Duffy
26 Nov 24
19:30 UTC

Northallerton Town	3–6	Redcar Athletic
Stephenson 16'; Nichols 64'; Ryan 67'		Blackford 18'; Fewster 33', 58'; Stott 47', 57', 77'

Referee: Harvey Websdale
12 Nov 24
19:45 UTC

Scarborough Athletic	7–0	Thornaby
Colville 31', 33'; Wiles 34'; Weledji 39'; King 54', 60'; Green 78'

Attendance: 341
Referee: Conor Ledgeway

Quarter-finals

22 Jan 25
19:45 UTC

Great Ayton	2–2	Redcar Town
32'; 90'		Beach 22'; Reader 39'
Penalties
Penalty missed Penalty scored	1–3	Storr (penalty scored); Williams (penalty missed); MacDonald (penalty scored); Wilson (penalty scored)

Stokesley Sports Club
Referee: Mark Benton
January 7, 2025

Scarborough Athletic	11-1	T.I.B.S.
Thornton 8'; Trialist 25'; Green 30', 37', 71'; Tear 32'; Wilson 41'; Bennett 47', 48'; Raine 56' (o.g.); Wiles 88'		Roberts 49'

Scarborough Sports Stadium
Attendance: 261
Referee: Sam Packer
28 Jan 25
19:30 UTC

Redcar Athletic	1–1	Boro Rangers
Fewster 64'		Thompson 85'
Penalties
Gott (penalty scored); Fewster (penalty scored); Fletcher (penalty scored); Boyes (penalty scored); Griffiths (penalty scored)	5–3	Turner (penalty scored); Hickman (penalty scored); Burns (penalty missed); Rose (penalty scored)

Referee: George Roberts
29 Jan 25
19:45 UTC

Middlesbrough U21/Res	3–1	Guisborough Town
Patterson 42'; Cartwright 51'; 89'		Mason 7'

Bishop Aukland FC
Referee: Matthew Dicicco

Semi-finals

19 Mar 25
19:45 UTC

Middlesbrough U21/Res	6–1	Redcar Town
		C. Smith 17'

Bishop Aukland FC
Referee: Liam Smith
18 Mar 25
19:45 UTC

Redcar Athletic	0–2	Scarborough Athletic
Liddle 6' (o.g.); Marshall 84'

Referee: Macauley Gibson

Final

1 May 25
19:30 BST

Middlesbrough U21/Res	1–2	Scarborough Athletic
Howells 59'	Report	Wiles 22'; Green 70'

Riverside Stadium, Middlesbrough
Attendance: 804

=== 2025/26 ===
First round

15 Oct 25
19@30 BST

Stokesley Sports Club	2–1	Great Ayton United
Forbes 47' (o.g.); Williams 81'		Jones 40'

Referee: Thomas hoyland
8 Nov 24
14:00 UTC

Fishburn Park	1–2	Richmond Town
Draper 45', 60', 75', 88'; Finn 55'		Weston 31', 50'; Bauer 45+2'

Referee: Callum Thirlwell

Second round

18 Nov 25
19:45 UTC

Marske United	5–3	Pickering Town

Referee: Anthony Duffy
11 Nov 25
19:45 UTC

Scarborough Athletic	3–2	Guisborough town
Chapman 33'; Colville 77'; Dear 90'		Willshaw 10'; Dowson 36'

Attendance: 242
Referee: MacAuley Gibson
18 Nov 25
19:30 UTC

Grangetown Boys Club	3–0	Whitby Town U18
Mahoney 26'; O'Brien 76'; Urwin 80'

Referee: Elliot Endrodi
7 Jan 26

Richmond Town	0–3	Redcar Athletic
		Fewster 71'; HOward 80'; Anderson 90'

Referee: Mark Shields
25 Nov 25
19:30 UTC

Thornaby	1–0	Northallerton Town
Conway 22'

Referee: Andrew Rice
26 Nov 25
19:30 UTC

Yarm & Eaglescliffe	3–3	York City
Dalton 35'; Roberts 56'; Williams 75'		Farrar 63'; Greening 69', 90+3' (pen.)
Penalties
Wild (penalty scored); Hillers (penalty scored); Atkinson (penalty scored)	3–0	Greening (penalty missed); Hewson (penalty missed); Farrar (penalty missed)

Referee: George Roberts
19 Nov 25
19:15 UTC

Boro Rangers	2–1	Middlesbrough U21/Res
Goodman 20'; Thompson 83'		22'

Referee: Matthew East
26 Nov 25
19:30 UTC

Stokesley Sports Club	0–2	Redcar Town
		Duffield 7'; Carmichael 56'

Attendance: 66
Referee: Nathan Alexander

Quarter finals

13 Jan 26
19:45 UTC

Marske United	0–4	Northallerton Town
		Croft 5'; Short 41', 77'; Harker 90+1'

Referee: Isaac Stephenson
18 mar 26
19:30 UTC

Redcar Athletic	6–0	Grangetown Boys Club
Burns 7'; Taylor 9'; Bartliff 33'; Anderson 45'; Round 58'; Fewster 83'

Attendance: 241
Referee: Anthony Duffy
20 Jan 26
19:45 UTC

Scarborough Athletic	2–2	Yarm & Eaglescliffe
Purver 48'; Thornton 50'		Larkin 16'; Thomson 83'
Penalties
Maloney (penalty scored); Allan (penalty scored); Green (penalty scored); Tear (penalty missed); Chapman (penalty scored); Waldron (penalty missed)	5–6	Wild (penalty scored); Stewart-Tichiner (penalty scored); Cheesebrough (penalty scored); Williams (penalty scored); Thomson (penalty missed); Catnach (penalty scored); Jones (penalty scored)

Attendance: 156
Referee: Thomas Ross
10 Mar 26
19:30 UTC

Redcar Town	1–3	Boro Rangers
Stares 15'		Crooks 46'; Walker 48'; Guy 80'

Referee: Thomas Shepherdson

Semi finals

24 Mar 26
19:30 UTC

Northallerton Town	1–2	Yarm & Eaglescliffe
Hughes 16'		Atkinson 57'; Titchner 90+4'

Attendance: 306
Referee: Harvey Websdale
8 Apr 26
19:30 BST

Boro Rangers	1–0	Redcar Athletic
Turner 51'

Referee: Tom Lishman

Final

29 Apr 26
19:30 BST

Yarm & Eaglescliffe	0–0	Boro Rangers
Penalties
Wild (penalty scored); Williams (penalty scored); Roberts (penalty scored); Larkin (penalty scored)	4–1	(penalty missed); Hickman (penalty missed); Walker (penalty scored)

Riverside Stadium, Middlesbrough
Attendance: 1617

=== 2026/27 ===
Sourced from North Riding FA website

First Round

7 Oct 26
19:45 BST

Richmond Town	7–2	Great Ayton United Royals
Proudlock; Sartini; Lamb; Sphuler; Banham; Hepper

Dave Clark Arena, Richmond
Referee: Bradley Triffitt

Second Round

23 Nov 26
19:45 BST

Whitby Town	–	Richmond Town

21 Oct 26
19:30 BST

Fishburn Park	1–3	York City
Storr 5'		Greening 34' (pen.), 57' (pen.); Farrar 78'

Turnbull Ground, Whitby
Attendance: 380
Referee: Craig Aitken
27 Oct 26
19:30 UTC

Thornaby	2–2	Yarm & Eaglescliffe
Howes 14'; Parnaby 67'		Roberts 16'; Larkin 48'
Penalties
Penalty scored Penalty missed	2–4	Penalty scored

Referee: Lewis Fryer
24 Nov 26
19:45 UTC

Marske United	–	Stokesley Sports Club

1 Dec 26
19:45 UTC

Redcar Town	–	Scarborough Athletic

7 Oct 26
19:45 BST

Middlesbrough U21/Res	7–2	Grangetown Boys Club

Heritage Park, Bishop Auckland
Referee: Harvey Websdale
28 Oct 26
19:45 UTC

Guisborough Town	5–1	Northallerton Town
Birtles 10'; Beddow 40'; Newall 72'; Rose 76'; Waller 90+2'		79'

Referee: Thomas Shepherdson
24 Nov 26
19:30 UTC

Redcar Athletic	–	Pickering Town Community
