= Grangetown Boys Club F.C. =

Association football club in England

Coordinates: 54°34′28.22″N 1°9′6.33″W

Grangetown Boys Club
- Full name: Grangetown Boys Club F.C
- Nickname: The Boysie
- Founded: 1941 (age 84–85)
- Ground: B & W Lifting Stadium, Grangetown, North Yorkshire
- Chairman: Carl Cairns
- Manager: Curtis Collantine
- League: Northern League Division Two
- 2025–26: Northern League Division Two, 17th of 22
| Home colours | Away colours |

Grangetown Boys Club is a football club based in Grangetown, North Yorkshire, England. Founded in 1941, they are currently members of the Northern League Division Two.

== History ==
After being founded in 1941, The club first found success in the MacMillan Bowl in 1963–64 before breaking a 36 year duck in 1999–2000, with subsequent triumphs in 2001–02, and 2002–03.

Boysie secured their inaugural Teesside League title in 1998–99 and successfully defended their championship status the following season in 1999–2000.

The turn of the millennium saw Boysie go from strength to strength, clinching back to back league titles in 2001–02 and 2002–03.

Alongside the traditional league and cup success the club also triumphed twice in the charity shield in the noughties, winning the R T Raine Trophy in 2002–03 and 2003–04

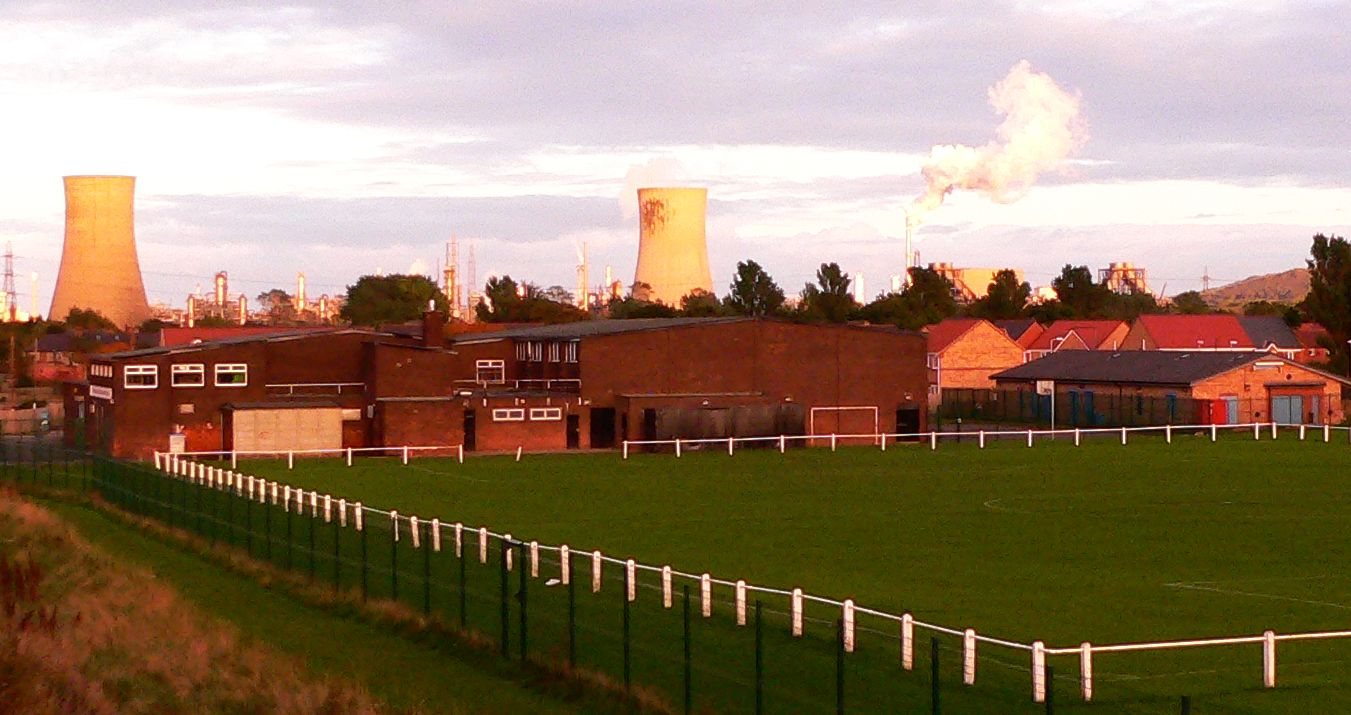
Grangetown Boys Club

The club's last Teesside league title came in 2010–11 after an eight year draught. The following season Boysie reached the Semi Final of the North Riding Senior Cup, ultimately losing 4–0 to York City.

Grangetown recorded a 2nd-place finish in the North Riding Football League's Premier Division in the 2023–24 season, it was confirmed that the FA had allocated Grangetown a place in the 2024–25 Northern League Division Two, entering the National League System for the first time in the club's history.

== Honours ==
Grangetown Boys Club's honours
| Competition | | Titles | Season |
|---|---|---|---|
| Teesside League | Division One | 5 | 1998–99, 1999-00, 2001–02, 2002–03, 2010–11 |
| Teesside League | MacMillan Bowl | 4 | 1963–64, 1999–00, 2001–02, 2002–03 |
| L R Raine Trophy | | 2 | 2002–03, 2003–04 |
| Lou Moore Trophy | | 1 | 2009–10 |
| North Riding County Cup | | 1 | 2002–03 |

== Records ==
- Best North Riding Senior Cup performance: Semi Finals 2012–13
- Best FA Vase performance: Second qualifying round 2025–26, 2026–27
