= Houghton Rangers F.C. =

Association football club in England

Houghton Rangers
- Full name: Houghton Rangers Football Club

Houghton Rangers F.C. was a football club based in Bedfordshire, England. They played in the FA Cup qualifying rounds in 1949, beating Bedford Corinthians 4–1 before losing 0–5 away at Hitchin Town.
