= Portrack Shamrocks F.C. =

Defunct association football club in England

- Full name: Portrack Shamrock Football Club
- Nickname(s): the Rocks
- Founded: 1921
- Dissolved: c. 1957
- Ground: Portrack Grange
Home colours

Portrack Shamrocks Football Club was an association football club from Portrack, near Stockton-on-Tees, England.

== History ==
The club was founded in 1921, originally under the name Stockton Shamrocks, changing to Portrack Shamrocks before the 1932–33 season. For much of its existence, the club's chief backer was comedian Jimmy James. Many of the club's players came from the Stockton Malleable ironworks.

Its greatest successes came in Teesside football, winning the Teesside Football League in 1949–50 and 1955–56, and the equivalent knockout competition - the Macmillan Bowl - in 1947–48, and three times in a row from 1954–55 to 1956–57. The club also won the Ellis Cup, which had started out as the South Bank Amateur Challenge Cup, in 1952–53, having been runner-up in 1938–39 and 1944–45. It also won the wartime North Riding Senior Cup in 1940, beating South Bank East End at Ayresome Park.

On a national scale, the club reached the 3rd qualifying round of the FA Cup three times between 1946 and 1950. It entered the FA Amateur Cup from 1924–25 to 1953–54, its best run being to the second round proper (last 32) in 1927–28 and 1933–34. Its 1–0 win over its larger neighbours Stockton in the 1933–34 edition was considered a major shock; in the second round it lost 1–0 at Worcestershire side Badsey Rangers.

The last recorded game for the club was in April 1957, and it seems to have been dissolved before the 1957–58 season.

== Colours ==
The club wore white shirts with a green shamrock badge and black shorts.

== Ground ==
The club's ground was known as Portrack Grange, and was known as Paddy's Field.

== Notable players ==
One Shamrocks player, Micky Fenton, who joined Middlesbrough in 1932, went on to play for England, gaining one cap in 1938. Matt Busby guested for the Rocks in the 1945 Ellis Cup final.

Players signing for League clubs from the Rocks include:

- Cecil Jackson, who scored the only goal in the Rocks' 1933 win at Stockton, signed for Darlington soon afterwards
- Outside-left James MacDonald signed for Manchester United in 1934
- Tom Ruddy and Tommy Crilly played for Derby County, joining via Darlington and Hartlepools United respectively, having played together for the Rocks in the early 1920s.

== External sites ==
- Teesside Football League tables
