= List of Middlesbrough F.C. players =

This is a list of notable footballers who have played for Middlesbrough. Generally, this means players that have played 100 or more first-class matches for the club, or been an officially designated captain.

Players are listed according to the date of their first-team debut for the club. Appearances are for first-team competitive matches only; wartime matches are excluded. Substitute appearances included. Names in bold are currently active at the club. Statistics correct as of 23 May 2026

== Notable players ==
Middlesbrough Legend (as voted for by fans in the Evening Gazette in 2007)
Club captains who have won a major senior competition (competitions noted in notes section)
Club record holder
Played their full career at Middlesbrough (professional teams only, including loans)
(n/a) = Information not available

Name	Nationality	Position	Boro career	Captaincy	Appearances	Goals	Notes
Peter McCracken	Scotland	Left-half; Left-back	1899–1900	1899–1900	34	0	
Andrew Ramsey	Scotland	Left-back	1899–1904	–	136	1	–
William Higgins	England	Centre-half	1900–1901	1900–1901	29	4	–
David Smith	Scotland	Right-half	1900–1905	1901–1903	114	12	–
Andy Davidson	Scotland	Left-half; Centre-half	1900–1906	–	201	8	–
Joseph Cassidy	Scotland	Inside-left; Centre-forward	1901–1906	–	135	34	–
Abraham Jones	England	Centre-half	1901–1906	–	149	9	–
George Friend	England	Left-back	2012–	–	100	3	–
Tim Williamson	England	Goalkeeper	1901–1923	19??–1914	602	2	
John Hogg	Scotland	Right-back	1902–1906	–	100	0	–
Sam Aitken	Scotland	Right-half; Centre-half	1903–1910	1907–19??	242	6	–
Alf Common	England	Forward	1905–1910	1905–1907	178	65	
Steve Bloomer	England	Inside-right	1905–1910	–	130	62	–
Billy Barker	England	Wing-half	1905–1913	–	113	2	–
Sammy Cail	England	Inside-left; Centre-forward	1906–1913	–	143	55	–
Donald McLeod	Scotland	Right-back	1908–1913	–	148	0	–
George Elliott	England	Centre-forward; Inside-forward	1909–1925	1913–1921	365	213	
Andy Jackson	Scotland	Centre-half	1910–1915	1914–1915	137	3	–
William Carr	England	Centre-half	1910–1924	–	118	4	–
Jacky Carr	England	Inside-forward; Outside-right	1910–1930	–	449	81	–
John Stirling	Scotland	Outside-right	1911–1914	–	112	8	–
George Malcolm	England	Right-half	1912–1915	–	101	1	–
Stewart Davidson	Scotland	Right-half	1913–1923	–	216	4	–
Walter Holmes	England	Full-back	1914–1928	–	174	1	–
Jack Marshall	Scotland	Right-back	1919–1923	–	121	0	–
Robert Pender	Scotland	Left-half; Inside-left	1919–1924	–	110	10	–
William Ellerginton	England	Centre-half; Left-half	1919–1924	–	131	0	–
William Victor Fox	England	Full-back; Left-half	1919–1924	–	112	1	–
Billy Birrell	Scotland	Inside-right; Outside-right	1920–1927	1926–1927	235	63	
Jack Clough	England	Goalkeeper	1922–1926	–	128	0	–
Reg Freeman	England	Full-back	1923–1930	1924–1926	187	0	–
Robert Furguson	Scotland	Centre-half; Right-back	1924–1931	–	159	2	–
Donald Ashman	England	Full-back; Half-back	1924–1932	–	174	2	–
George Camsell	England	Centre-forward	1925–1939	–	453	345	
Joseph Miller	Ireland	Right-half	1926–1930	–	153	0	–
John Smith	Scotland	Full-back	1926–1930	–	123	0	–
Billy Pease	England	Outside-right	1926–1933	–	238	102	–
James Mathieson	Scotland	Goalkeeper	1926–1934	–	264	0	–
John Reid McKay	Scotland	Inside-forward	1926–1934	–	109	20	–
Joseph Peacock	England	Wing-half	1927–1930	1929–1930	85	4	–
Bobbie Bruce	Scotland	Inside-forward	1927–1935	–	253	71	
Jack Elkes	England	Inside-left; Centre-half	1929–1933	–	113	4	–
John McFarlane	Scotland	Wing-half; Inside-forward	1929–1933	–	101	0	–
John Jennings	England	Full-back; Right-half	1929–1937	1930–1932	205	10	–
Bill Forrest	Scotland	Left-half	1929–1939	–	333	8	–
William Brown	England	Right-half; Right-back	1931–1946	–	274	2	–
Tom Griffiths	Wales	Centre-half; Right-back	1932–1935	1932–1935	92	1	
Frederick Gibson	England	Goalkeeper	1932–1936	–	120	0	–
Bobby Baxter	Scotland	Centre-half; Inside-left	1932–1939	193?–193?	266	20	–
John Martin	England	Wing-half	1932–1939	–	137	3	–
Micky Fenton	England	Centre-forward	1932–1950	–	269	162	–
Ralph Birkett	England	Outside-right	1934–1938	–	101	36	
David Cumming	Scotland	Goalkeeper	1936–1949	–	157	0	–
Wilf Mannion	England	Inside-forward	1936–1954	–	368	110	
George Hardwick	England	Full-back	1937–1950	19??–19??	166	7	–
Johnny Spuhler	England	Centre-forward	1945–1954	–	241	81	–
Jimmy Gordon	Scotland	Wing-half	1946–1954	1951–1952	253	4	–
Harry Bell	England	Wing-half	1946–1955	–	315	10	–
Richard (Dickie) Robinson	England	Full-back	1946–1959	–	416	1	–
Ronald Dicks	England	Wing-half	1947–1958	1956–1958	334	10	–
Tommy Blenkinsopp	England	Defender	1948–1952	–	100	0	–
Alex McCrae	Scotland	Defender	1948–1953	–	130	49	–
Lindy Delapenha	Jamaica	Forward	1949–1958	–	270	93	
Arthur Fitzsimons	Republic of Ireland	Inside-forward	1949–1959	–	231	51	–
Raymond Barnard	England	Full-back	1951–1961	–	118	0	–
Ray Bilcliff	England	Full-back	1951–1961	–	190	0	
John Brian Phillips	England	Centre-half	1954–1960	–	124	2	–
Alan Peacock	England	Centre-forward	1954–1964	–	238	141	–
Bill Harris	Wales	Inside-forward; Wing-half	1954–1965	19??–19??	378	72	
Brian Clough	England	Centre-forward	1955–1961	19??–19??	222	204	
Derek McLean	England	Inside-forward	1952–1961	–	123	30	–
Billy Day	England	Outside-right	1955–1962	–	131	21	–
Edwin Holliday	England	Outside-left	1956–1962; 1965-1966	–	169	25	–
Ronald Burbeck	England	Winger	1956–1963	–	152	29	–
Michael McNeil	England	Left-back	1958–1964	–	193	3	–
Bob Appleby	England	Goalkeeper	1959–1967	–	110	0	–
Arthur Kaye	England	Outside-right	1960–1965	–	185	44	–
Billy Horner	England	Defender	1960–1969	–	217	12	–
Gordon Jones	England	Full-back	1960–1973	1966–1973	532	5	
Alex Smith	England	Defender	1961–1972	–	137	1	–
Bill Gates	England	Centre-half	1961–1974	–	333	13	–
Mel Nurse	Wales	Centre-half	1962–1965	1962–1965	124	9	
Ian Gibson	Scotland	Midfield	1962–1966	1965–1966	184	47	
Bryan Orritt	Wales	Inside-forward	1962–1966	–	128	23	
Frank Spraggon	England	Defender	1962–1975	–	331	3	–
Edward Connachan	Scotland	Goalkeeper	1963–1966	–	105	0	–
Arthur Horsfield	England	Forward	1963–1969	–	127	56	
Jim Irvine	Scotland	Centre-forward	1964–1967	–	100	43	–
Stan Anderson	England	Wing-half	1965–1966	196?–196?	22	2	–
Richard Rooks	England	Centre-half	1965–1969	–	150	14	
Derrick Downing	England	Winger	1965–1972	–	204	49	–
Eric McMordie	Northern Ireland	Midfield	1965–1974	–	277	26	
David Chadwick	India	Winger	1966–1970	–	115	4	–
John Hickton	England	Forward; Utility	1966–1977	–	499	187	
Joe Laidlaw	England	Midfield; Forward	1967–1972	–	128	23	–
Willie Maddren	England	Central defender	1969–1978	–	354	21	
David Mills	England	Forward	1968–1979; 1984–1985	–	398	111	
David Armstrong	England	Midfielder	1970–1981	–	431	77	
Jim Platt	Northern Ireland	Goalkeeper	1970–1982	????–????	481	0	
Nobby Stiles	England	Wing-half	1971–1973	1971–197?	69	2	–
Stuart Boam	England	Central defender	1971–1979	–	393	16	–
John Craggs	England	Right-back	1971–1982	1981	488	14	
Alan Foggon	England	Winger	1972–1976	–	141	50	–
Peter Brine	England	Midfielder	1972–1977	–	101	8	–
Bobby Murdoch	Scotland	Midfield	1973–1976	–	125	9	–
Graeme Souness	Scotland	Midfield	1973–1978	–	216	27	
Tony McAndrew	Scotland	Central defender	1973–1982	1979–1981	358	18	–
Terry Cooper	England	Left-back	1974–1978	–	133	1	–
Ian Bailey	England	Left-back	1975–1982	–	175	3	–
Billy Ashcroft	England	Forward	1977–1982	–	179	25	
Mark Proctor	England	Midfield	1978–1981; 1989–1993	–	273	20	–
David Hodgson	England	Forward	1978–1982; 1987	–	143	20	–
Terry Cochrane	Northern Ireland	Winger	1978–1983	–	128	12	
Dave Shearer	England	Forward	1978–1983	–	115	30	–
Irving Nattrass	England	Right-back	1979–1986	1983–1985	221	2	
Mick Baxter	England	Central defender	1981–1984	–	138	8	–
Heine Otto	Netherlands	Midfield	1981–1985	–	187	28	–
David Currie	England	Forward	1982–1986	–	127	31	–
Tony Mowbray	England	Central defender	1982–1991	1987–1991	425	29	
Stephen Pears	England	Goalkeeper	1983; 1985–1995	–	424	0	
Gary Hamilton	Scotland	Midfield	1983–1989	–	268	28	–
Gary Pallister	England	Central defender	1984–1989; 1998–2000	–	250	7	
Colin Cooper	England	Defender	1984–1991; 1998–2006	–	423	14	–
Archie Stephens	England	Forward	1985–1987	–	107	27	–
Brian Laws	England	Right-back	1985–1988	1985–1986	129	14	–
Stuart Ripley	England	Right-winger	1985–1992	–	311	31	–
Alan Kernaghan	Republic of Ireland	Central defender	1985–1993	1991–1993	268	22	
Bernie Slaven	Republic of Ireland	Forward	1985–1993	–	381	146	
Gary Parkinson	England	Right-back	1986–1993	–	258	7	–
Paul Kerr	England	Midfield	1987–1991	–	162	18	–
Nicky Mohan	England	Central defender	1987–1994	–	131	4	–
Peter Davenport	England	Forward	1988–1990	–	28	5	
Jimmy Phillips	England	Left-back	1990–1993	–	172	6	–
John Hendrie	Scotland	Winger; Forward	1990–1996	1993–1994	234	55	
Robbie Mustoe	England	Midfield	1990–2002	–	367	34	–
Andy Peake	England	Midfield	1991–1994	–	100	1	
Jamie Pollock	England	Midfield	1991–1996	–	193	19	
Curtis Fleming	Republic of Ireland	Defender	1991–2001	–	317	4	
Alan Moore	Republic of Ireland	Left-winger	1991–2001	–	142	17	–
Craig Hignett	England	Winger	1992–1997	–	195	48	–
Chris Morris	Republic of Ireland	Full-back	1992–1997	–	104	4	–
Phil Stamp	England	Midfield	1993–2001	–	154	8	–
Neil Cox	England	Defender	1994–1996	–	120	4	
Bryan Robson	England	Midfield	1994–1997	–	27	1	
Nigel Pearson	England	Central defender	1994–1998	1994–1998	139	5	
Juninho Paulista	Brazil	Midfield	1995–1997; 1999; 2002–2004	–	155	34	
Fabrizio Ravanelli	Italy	Forward	1996–1997	–	50	32	
Mikkel Beck	Denmark	Striker	1996–1998	–	115	31	–
Andy Townsend	Republic of Ireland	Midfield	1997–1999	1998–1999	88	4	–
Gianluca Festa	Italy	Central defender	1997–2002	–	171	12	
Mark Schwarzer	Australia	Goalkeeper	1997–2008	–	446	0	
Hamilton Ricard	Colombia	Forward	1998–2002	–	134	43	–
Paul Ince	England	Midfield	1999–2002	1999–2002	106	9	–
Joseph-Désiré Job	Cameroon	Forward	2000–2006	–	111	21	–
Stuart Parnaby	England	Defender/Midfield	2000–2007	–	128	4	–
Ugo Ehiogu	England	Defender	2000–2007	–	150	8	
Jonathan Greening	England	Midfield	2001–2004	–	109	4	
Szilárd Németh	Slovakia	Forward	2001–2006	–	146	29	–
Franck Queudrue	France	Left-back	2001–2006	–	199	12	
Gareth Southgate	England	Defender	2001–2006	2002–2006	204	4	
Stewart Downing	England	Midfield	2001–2009; 2015–2019	–	404	32	
George Boateng	Netherlands	Midfield	2002–2008	2006–2008	222	9	–
Massimo Maccarone	Italy	Forward	2002–2007	–	102	24	
Doriva	Brazil	Midfield	2003–2006	–	110	1	–
Chris Riggott	England	Defender	2003–2009	–	121	8	
Matthew Bates	England	Defender	2004–2012	2010–2012	126	6	–
David Wheater	England	Defender	2004–2011	–	157	11	–
Emanuel Pogatetz	Austria	Defender	2005–2010	2008–2010	112	3	
Julio Arca	Argentina	Midfield	2006–2013	–	181	9	–
Jonathan Woodgate	England	Defender	2006–2008; 2012–2016	2014–2015	112	2	–
Gary O'Neil	England	Midfielder	2007–2011	–	120	12	–
Marvin Emnes	Netherlands	Forward	2008–2014	–	161	41	–
Justin Hoyte	Trinidad and Tobago	Defender	2008–2013	–	162	2	–
Rhys Williams	Australia	Defender/Midfield	2009–2016	2012–2014	141	5	–
Barry Robson	Scotland	Midfielder	2010–2012	–	90	19	
Scott McDonald	Australia	Forward	2010–2013	–	124	49	–
Ben Gibson	England	Defender	2010–2018	–	204	4	–
Grant Leadbitter	England	Midfield	2012–2019	2015–2019	244	33	–
George Friend	England	Defender	2012–2020	2019–2020	299	10	
Albert Adomah	Ghana	Midfield	2013–2016	–	143	26	–
Dimitrios Konstantopoulos	Greece	Goalkeeper	2013–2019	–	112	0	–
Daniel Ayala	Spain	Defender	2013–2020	–	216	23	–
Adam Clayton	England	Midfield	2014–2020	–	241	1	–
Dael Fry	England	Defender	2015–2026	2025–2026	295	5	–
Adama Traore	Spain	Midfield	2016–2018	–	71	5	–
Britt Assombalonga	DR Congo	Forward	2017–2021	2020–2021	161	47	
Jonny Howson	England	Midfield	2017–2025	2021–2025	320	9	
Marcus Tavernier	England	Midfield	2017–2021	–	155	18	–
Paddy McNair	Northern Ireland	Defender	2018–2024	–	219	14	–
George Saville	England	Midfield	2018–2021	–	118	12	–
Anfernee Dijksteel	Suriname	Defender	2019–2025	–	167	3	–
Matt Crooks	England	Midfielder	2021–2024	–	115	23	–
Isaiah Jones	England	Forward	2021–2025	–	127	13	–
Hayden Hackney	England	Midfield	2021–2026	–	154	16	–
**Riley McGree**	Australia	Midfield	2022–	-	127	21	–
Emmanuel Latte Lath	Ivory Coast	Forward	2023–2025	–	67	29	

== Key to positions ==
- GK — Goalkeeper
- RB — Right back
- LB — Left back
- CB — Centre back
- MF — Midfielder
- RW — Right winger
- LW — Left winger
- FW — Forward

== See also ==
- Middlesbrough F.C.
- Middlesbrough F.C. Player of the Year
- List of Middlesbrough F.C. records and statistics

== Notes and references ==
- Middlesbrough FC. The Who's Who of Middlesbrough. Breedon Books. ISBN 978-1-85983-569-2.
- **^{E}** End of contract
- **^{A}** Initial fee £2.5 million, rising to just over £5 million based on appearances.
- Glasper, Harry. Middlesbrough, A Complete Record, 1876-1989. Breedon Books Sport. ISBN 0-907969-53-4.
- "Squad Profiles". BBC Sport.
- "Soccerbase". Soccerbase.
