= History of Middlesbrough F.C. =

History of an English football club

Middlesbrough Football Club is an association football club based in Middlesbrough, England. Formed in 1876, the club played at Linthorpe Road from 1880, and were first elected to the Football League in 1899. The club moved to Ayresome Park for the 1903–04 season, and would remain there for ninety-two years, moving to the Riverside Stadium in 1995.

== Formation through to the Great War (1876–1914) ==
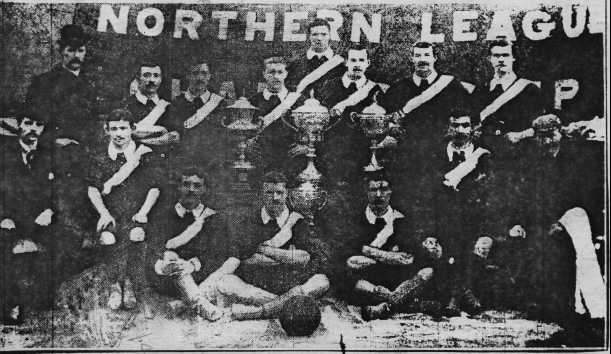
The breakaway Middlesbrough Ironopolis displaying their Northern championships

According to Boro folklore, the idea for forming the football club was suggested during a tripe supper at the Corporation Hotel, Middlesbrough, and while this has since been discovered by club historian Harry Glasper to be untrue, it is certainly true that like many football clubs of the time (such as The Wednesday), Middlesbrough F.C. were formed by members of the local cricket club wishing to stay fit during the winter. Indeed, it was at Albert Park on Linthorpe Road where players from Middlesbrough Cricket Club formed the fledgling team. The club retained its amateur status until 1889 when several members of Middlesbrough FC split to form Middlesbrough Ironopolis over a dispute. Both teams made their debuts as professional teams within a week of each other in December 1889.

After three years it was clear that both clubs were becoming more successful and club officials knew that only an amalgamation would give them a serious chance of a place in the Football League. On 7 May 1892 an application was made to the Football League under the name of Middlesbrough and Ironopolis Football and Athletic Club. The application failed and both clubs went their separate ways once more, as Middlesbrough FC reverted to their amateur status. They won the FA Amateur Cup in 1895 and again in 1898. The following year, 1899, Middlesbrough turned professional again in an attempt to gain entry to the Football League, and on 18 May 1899, backed by local neighbours Newcastle United and Sunderland, they were admitted to the Second Division, narrowly ahead of Blackpool.

Boro's first season in the FL was not a success, as they failed to win an away game, finishing 14th out of 18 teams. The 1901–02 campaign saw Boro finish second, to gain promotion to the First Division, where they would play their home games in their new ground, Ayresome Park, with a North Stand designed by Archibald Leitch, that would be their home for the next 92 years. This was exactly next to Ironopolis's old stadium, known as The Paradise Ground.

By February 1905, Boro had not won an away game for two years, and in an attempt to remedy this the board sanctioned the controversial transfer of Alf Common for a then record fee of £1,000. The following season, Steve Bloomer arrived from Derby County, and by 1907–08 Boro had secured their highest finish in the top division, finishing sixth, just two points behind runners-up Aston Villa.

National scandal was to follow in 1910, when Boro defeated local rivals Sunderland 1–0. It was to emerge after the match that Boro manager Andy Walker had offered Sunderland's players the sum of £2 each to let Boro win the game. The Sunderland players told their manager and he took it further. Walker was given an indefinite suspension from the FL, and Middlesbrough's season petered out to a drab conclusion. Four years later, Middlesbrough enjoyed their highest finish to date, as they ended the 1913–14 season in third place, before the First World War intervened.

== Between the World Wars (1919–39) ==
After the war, several players were too old to continue, and three had been killed in action. Before the season restarted, Boro were victorious in the Northern Victory League, and looked forward to competitive football again. While striker George Elliott and keeper Tim Williamson were still at the top of their game, the team's chance at the championship had faded and they finished mid-table. They remained there for the next few seasons, before finally slipping to relegation in 1923–24, finishing 22nd of 22, ten points adrift of their nearest rivals.

Three seasons later, they won the Division Two title, despite gaining only one point from their first four games. For their fifth game, injury meant George Camsell, signed from Third Division North side Durham City the previous season, got a start. He was to prove a revelation, and finished with a record 59 league goals, including nine hat tricks. He would continue as top scorer for each of the next ten seasons.

Although back in the top flight, the club didn't last long. Despite a good start to the season, Herbert Bamlett was replaced in January 1928, and replaced by former Spurs boss Peter McWilliam. However, following this, the club slipped to bottom of the table and were relegated. They bounced straight back the next season though, winning another Second Division title, remaining in the top flight after that until 1954.

After several seasons of milling around the bottom reaches of the table, 1936–37 saw the emergence of Wilf Mannion, whom Boro had signed from local club South Bank St Peter's. George Hardwick, who came from South Bank East End, also emerged. Both would go on to become England internationals in the years ahead. Boro rose to seventh that season, before moving to fifth, then up to fourth, their highest since before the First World War. Under former Grimsby boss Wilf Gallow, the club looked good to challenge for the 1939–40 title. In fact, Boro were second-bottom after three games, when war was declared, and broke up arguably their finest ever side.

== A steady decline (1946–66) ==
After the war, the club was unable to recover the form of the previous seasons and hovered around mid-table and the early rounds of the FA Cup. With Jamaican-born Lindy Delapenha playing on the wing, Boro climbed to ninth in 1949–50. The next season, nearing Christmas, Boro headed the First Division table, but a 1–0 defeat at Leeds knocked confidence and they slipped to sixth. Midway through the season, Hardwick also left the club to become player-manager of Oldham, and afterwards the team began to falter, eventually falling to relegation in 1953–54.

Their first season began awfully, but they managed to recover and finish 12th. A 6–0 win over West Ham and a 9–0 defeat to Blackburn showed it was a season of mixed results. Mannion had refused to sign a new contract upon relegation and was transferred to Hull City, where soon afterwards he disappeared into non-league football.

This was the start of a 20-year spell outside the top flight, but saw the emergence of another Middlesbrough great – Brian Clough. Making his debut in 1955–56, he helped the club to 14th place. From the next season, he started to establish himself in history. He rattled in the goals – 38 in that season, then 40, 43, 39 and 34, gaining his only two England caps in 1959–60, before inevitably leaving for arch-rivals Sunderland. After 204 goals in 222 games, he would be missed. Over that period, Boro maintained reasonable progress in the Second Division but never looked like gaining promotion.

After a 4th-place finish in 1962–63, the only way for Boro was down. They finished 10th, 17th, then 21st. On the last day of the season, Middlesbrough needed a draw at Cardiff to stay up, who themselves needed a win to remain in the division. A hat-trick from makeshift striker Dickie Rooks couldn't help Boro, who went down 5–3, and were relegated to the Third Division for the first time.

== Recovery, success and disaster (1966–86) ==
It was new manager Stan Anderson's job to return the club to the second flight. After only two wins in their first ten games, fans thought the club was already on the way down to the Fourth Division, but Anderson turned it around and the team finished second. Gordon Jones was captain, and John Hickton arrived, both of whom would go on to be second and third respectively in the club's all time appearances table.

After regaining promotion to the Second Division, Boro were on good form. They wouldn't finish below ninth during the next eight seasons. The FA Cup saw the club never get past the quarter-finals, a feat they were yet to accomplish in their history. John Hickton, converted from defence, was proving a revelation up front, while Willie Maddren made his debut in 1969, with John Craggs and Stuart Boam joining three seasons later. Jim Platt had also taken over in goal. With Graeme Souness joining soon after, the spine of the team to gain promotion to the First Division was there. Jack Charlton took over as manager and guided the team back to the top flight at last. They ensured promotion as early as 23 March, and with eight games of the season left, they became runaway champions, finishing with a record 65 points.

Middlesbrough spent the next eight seasons in the First Division, finishing 7th in 1974–75 and were generally a mid-table side in the seasons that followed. Some believe the side lacked the necessary firepower at the time to become serious contenders. However, the club's youth system turned out talent such as David Armstrong, Graeme Souness, Stan Cummins, Craig Johnston and Mark Proctor.

Back in the top flight, the team also gained some luck in the cups, albeit still not winning anything. In 1974–75, Boro reached the sixth round of the FA Cup and the quarter-finals of the League Cup. The next season, they reached the semi-final of the League Cup, where they lost 4–1 on aggregate to Manchester City. 1975–76 however was when Boro won their first silverware as a professional side, lifting the Anglo-Scottish Cup in its first season after a two-legged final win over Fulham.

After four seasons in charge, Charlton resigned as boss following three mid-table finishes, with John Neal taking over. In his first season, Boro should have reached the FA Cup semi-finals for the first time, but Second Division Leyton Orient managed to take them to a home replay and win. The club's patchy league form meant they did not climb any higher than mid-table however.

After eleven years at the club, David Mills was sold for a then national record of £482,222 to West Bromwich Albion in 1979. Neal left in 1981 and Bobby Murdoch took over. That same year Proctor, Johnston and Armstrong all left the club. Dutch midfielder Heini Otto was signed from FC Twente. The 1981/82 season saw Middlesbrough relegated in last place.

In February 1982, chairman Charles Amer and his son Kevin, a director, left the club to be replaced by George Kitching. That season saw Middlesbrough suffer a disappointing relegation back to the Second Division. With Murdoch still as manager, and, after appearing at the World Cup, Jim Platt as captain, led Boro into another disappointing season. In a season in which Tony Mowbray made his debut, the defence was leaking goals. Murdoch was asked to resign, Kitching stepped down to be replaced by Mike McCullagh, and Malcolm Allison became manager. The club eventually finished 16th. Platt left at the end of that season and Stephen Pears came in on loan from Manchester United.

Serious financial problems were now staring Boro in the face. Allison was being pressured into off-loading star players and matters came to a head in March 1984 when he claimed it was "Better for the club to die than to linger slowly on its deathbed". This saw Allison kicked out and replaced by Willie Maddren, temporarily with some help from Jack Charlton. Middlesbrough were dropping down the table though, finishing 19th in 1984–85.

On the opening day of 1985–86, Maddren named four debutants in the team that lost 3–0 to Wimbledon, one of whom was Gary Pallister. The cups were not going well either, and Boro were getting knocked out in the early rounds with alarming regularity. McCullagh left the club and was replaced by Alf Duffield, another change in chairmanship. In 1986, Maddren left to be replaced by coach Bruce Rioch. In April the club, fighting for its existence, had to borrow £30,000 from the Professional Footballers' Association to pay wages. The final game of the season saw Boro relegated to the Third Division once more.

== A near death experience (1986) ==
On 21 May 1986, the club called in the Provisional Liquidator and shortly afterwards, the club was wound up. In August, Rioch and 29 other non-playing staff were sacked by the Official Receiver and the gates to Ayresome Park were padlocked. Some players left, while others stayed under Rioch and coach Colin Todd. Without the £350,000 capital required for Football League registration, the death of the club was announced on Tyne Tees Television, and it seemed inevitable that the club would fold permanently. However, Steve Gibson, a member of the board at the time, brought together a consortium involving Bulkhaul Limited, ICI, Scottish and Newcastle Breweries and London businessman Henry Moszkowicz. With ten minutes to spare, Middlesbrough F.C. avoided missing the deadline and completed their registration with the Football League for the 1986–87 season with both a change of crest to a circular crest with the lion in the middle and the words "Middlesbrough Football Club 1986" around the circle, and a change of name to Middlesbrough Football and Athletic Club (1986) Ltd. With the gates to Ayresome Park still closed by the bailiffs, Middlesbrough were forced to play their opening game of the season at Hartlepool United's home ground, Victoria Park.

== Rioch revival... and more ups and downs (1986–94) ==
Manager Bruce Rioch and his players pulled together after the takeover and with his young squad including Boro legends Colin Cooper, Gary Pallister and Tony Mowbray finished second in the Third Division behind AFC Bournemouth to win automatic promotion to the Second Division. A year later they won the Second Division promotion/First Division relegation playoffs, after defeating First Division Chelsea to send them down, and achieved a second successive promotion which landed them in the First Division.

Middlesbrough showed promise in 1988–89 and fought themselves to a mid-table place, but a form slump in the second half of the season culminated in relegation on the final day- they had not occupied a relegation place that season before then. Gary Pallister was sold to Manchester United for a then national record transfer fee of £2.3 million. Their dismal form continued into the following season and a second successive relegation looked on the cards. Rioch was subsequently dismissed in March 1990 and his successor Colin Todd just managed to save Boro from the drop. The same season saw Middlesbrough play in their first Wembley cup final, suffering a 1–0 defeat to Chelsea in the Zenith Data Systems Cup. The team was led out at Wembley by an unfit Tony Mowbray.

1990–91 saw Boro's form improve substantially and a seventh-place finish was enough to qualify for the playoffs – this time four promotion places were up for grabs because the First Division was re-expanding to 22 clubs for the 1991–92 season. But the promotion dream was ended in the semi-finals when Boro lost to eventual playoff winners Notts County. Todd left soon afterwards and was succeeded by Charlton's Lennie Lawrence.

Lawrence's first season at the helm was a success, with Boro reaching the League Cup semi finals for the second time and most significantly finishing runners-up in the Second Division – booking their place in the inaugural Premier League.

Boro were mid table in the Premiership come Christmas 1992, but a run of seven defeats beginning in February dragged them down the table and they were relegated after losing their penultimate game of the season. The board kept faith in Lawrence but he resigned a year later after failing to achieve promotion back to the Premiership.

== Robson revolution (1994–2001) ==
Lawrence's successor was 37-year-old player-manager Bryan Robson, who had just ended an illustrious 13-year playing career with Manchester United and was a former England captain. With assistant manager Viv Anderson, Boro spent big and brought in players like club record signing at the time Neil Cox for £1 million, club captain Nigel Pearson and Norwegian striker Jan Åge Fjørtoft. His first season was a great success and Boro lifted the Division One title and getting promoted back to the Premiership after a two-year exile. A large part in the promotion push was played by a good loan signing in the form of Uwe Fuchs, scoring 9 goals in 13 league games. 1994–95 was the club's last season at Ayresome Park, from which they were relocating after 92 years to their new home at the Riverside Stadium on the banks of the River Tees.

Boro went on a massive spending spree after their promotion to the Premiership, paying £5.25million for 21-year-old Tottenham Hotspur winger Nick Barmby and £4.75million for 22-year-old Brazilian midfielder Juninho Paulista. The policy looked to have paid off as Boro stood fourth in the Premiership in October, but a terrible run of form followed and they slid to 12th place in the final table. Boro's dismal away form – just 8 goals in 19 games – also helped end their dreams of European football.

Robson paid £7 million for Juventus striker Fabrizio Ravanelli and £4 million for Brazilian midfielder Emerson for the following season, but Boro spent the season battling relegation instead of chasing a top-five finish. Their difficult task was compounded by a deduction of three points imposed just after Christmas, as punishment for the club's failure to fulfil a fixture against Blackburn Rovers. The club's explanation was that so many squad members had been hit by a flu virus that it could not field a competitive team; however the Football Association rejected this explanation despite allegedly encouraging the team to do this in the first place.

Meanwhile, Boro were building up an impressive cup run and reached the first senior cup final of their history in March, where they faced Leicester City in the League Cup. The deadlock was not broken until extra time, when Fabrizio Ravanelli's goal looked to have secured the trophy for Boro. But Leicester then scored an equaliser and went on to win the replay, through a goal from Steve Claridge.

Boro's three point deduction eventually cost them their Premiership status and they were relegated on the final day of the season after a draw at Elland Road. A week later they lost 2–0 to Chelsea in the FA Cup final and became the first English club to lose both major cup finals and be relegated from the top division in the same season. Despite these setbacks, Juninho still managed to finish as runner-up in the Footballer of the Year award to Gianfranco Zola.

The board kept faith in Robson and they were rewarded with promotion back to the Premiership as Division One runners-up the following season. While Emerson, Ravanelli and Juninho were all sold, new players such as Paul Merson, Marco Branca and Mark Schwarzer were brought in, helping the club not only gain promotion at the first attempt. Such was Merson's form that he was the only player from outside the top flight to be picked for England's World Cup squad that year. Amazingly, Boro reached the League Cup final for the second consecutive year, unfortunately once again losing to their opponents, Chelsea, 2–0 after extra time.

During this period, Robson also acted as a coach to the England team under Terry Venables. Two more secure mid-table finishes followed, but Boro found themselves battling relegation come the 2000–01 season. Venables was appointed to work alongside Robson and they comfortably avoided the drop.

== Reaching new heights under McClaren (2001–06) ==
In the 2001 close season, Robson left the club by mutual agreement and was replaced by Steve McClaren – the Manchester United assistant manager who was regarded as one of the finest coaches in Europe and was also one of the most prominent coaches in the England team. Players such as Franck Queudrue, Mark Wilson, Jonathan Greening and £6 million signing Gareth Southgate were brought in to refresh the squad and blended with promising youth players such as Luke Wilkshire and Robbie Stockdale. His first season saw Boro finish 12th in the Premiership and reach the FA Cup semi finals.

The 2002–03 season held high hopes. After the promise shown in the previous season, fan favourite Juninho returned to the club for a third spell alongside George Boateng and Massimo Maccarone, an £8.15 million signing from Empoli and Italy's first player to be capped having never played in Serie A, was brought in to increase the firepower available to McClaren. Geremi from Real Madrid was also signed in on loan. Pre-season results were encouraging, but a cruciate ligament injury to Juninho just before the start of the season was a massive setback for the club. An 11th-place finish followed, a marginal improvement on the previous season's finish but slightly disappointing considering Middlesbrough's early season form suggested that they could qualify for Europe.

The following season, 2003–04, saw Middlesbrough win their first major trophy. While Geremi opted to sign for Chelsea, Boudewijn Zenden, Danny Mills, and Gaizka Mendieta were brought in on loan to boost the squad. Success was to follow as they finally won a major trophy after beating Bolton Wanderers 2–1 in the League Cup final. This success also ensured that Boro would qualify for Europe – the UEFA Cup – for the first time. The season ended on a disappointing note as they were convincingly beaten 5–1 by Portsmouth on the final day to end a disappointing league campaign. They finished 11th but had been inconsistent with victories against Manchester United at Old Trafford a 5–3 thriller at home to Birmingham City and a 3–0 thrashing of Leeds United at Elland Road followed by defeats by Leeds at home and Wolves away (both were relegated this season), Four consecutive premiership games without scoring at home, and 4–0 and 4–1 thrashings by Arsenal (who went undefeated throughout the league season) proved to be a disappointment – but qualification for Europe by winning the League Cup more than made up for this.

The following season started very well, hovering around the top six until November, but a horrendous number of injuries almost sucked them into mid-table and out of the UEFA-cup qualifying places. UEFA cup qualification was eventually achieved after a 1–1 draw with Manchester City at the City of Manchester Stadium. If City had won then they would have qualified in Boro's place, and they almost made it when they were awarded a penalty kick in the final minute, but Mark Schwarzer saved Robbie Fowler's spot kick. In their inaugural UEFA Cup run, Middlesbrough performed brightly but were eventually knocked out in the fourth round by Sporting CP.

2005–06 was a mixed season for Middlesbrough. They found an ability to beat the big teams at the Riverside beating Arsenal 2–1 and thrashing Manchester United 4–1. However dismal mid-season form saw them sucked into the bottom half of the Premiership, and at one stage they looked in real danger of being relegated (notably after their 7–0 loss to Arsenal), although a subsequent recovery — which included a 3–0 win over eventual champions Chelsea — saw them finish fourteenth. In McClaren's last Premiership game against Fulham, Steve picked an all English 16 with 15 of the players (except Malcolm Christie) coming from the local area and the average age of the team was less than 20 making it the youngest ever Premiership side. Lee Cattermole was the captain for that match making himself Middlesbrough's youngest ever captain of the first team. To complete the set the team was the first all English starting line-up since Bradford City's in 1999 and the first all English matchday squad since Aston Villa's in 1998 to play in the Premiership. On 27 April 2006, Middlesbrough reached the UEFA Cup final in Eindhoven, with a victory over FC Steaua București 4–3 on aggregate in stunning fashion, being 3–0 down on aggregate after 25 minutes of the second leg. This was the second time in the competition that 'Boro found themselves 3–0 down after 25 minutes of the return leg and yet still going through as they beat FC Basel 4–3 in the quarter-finals. Boro fans watched from the stands as their Middlesbrough team lost 4–0 in the final to Sevilla FC. Trailing Sevilla 0–1 at the break, McClaren opted for a very attacking line-up for the second half with four strikers, which had worked to great effect in the quarter and semi-finals. Nevertheless, Middlesbrough were forced to push on in desperate search of an equaliser. Whilst playing in European matches, a popular chant amongst Middlesbrough fans was "We're just a small town in Europe".

== Southgate, relegation and life in the football league (2006–10) ==
On 4 May, McClaren was chosen to take over as the manager of the England national team after the 2006 World Cup. Martin O'Neill, Tony Mowbray and Alan Curbishley had been linked with the manager's job at Middlesbrough, with Steve Gibson expecting whoever took over to achieve a Champions League place in the near future. Gibson then looked within his own club and decided to make club captain Gareth Southgate the next manager of Middlesbrough F.C. Southgate signed a five-year contract and decided to finish his playing career, at the age of 35, to focus entirely on his new job. This made him the second youngest manager in the Premiership at the time. His appointment was controversial as he does not currently possess the coaching qualifications required to manage a Premiership football club. However, at a Premier League meeting on 22 November 2006, Southgate was granted a dispensation to continue in his role until the end of the season, during which time it was announced that he will study for the Uefa Pro A Licence.

George Boateng was appointed captain. Several players, including Jimmy Floyd Hasselbaink, Franck Queudrue and Doriva left the club in the summer while left sided Argentine Julio Arca was signed from local rivals Sunderland for a fee of £1.75m, and young Frenchman Hérold Goulon from Olympique Lyonnais on a three-year deal.

Southgate's competitive debut started with a 3–2 defeat to newly promoted Reading. After a 4–0 loss against Portsmouth, Southgate signed two international defenders to strengthen up his backline. England international Jonathan Woodgate joined his home-town team on loan from Real Madrid, Chelsea's German international centreback Robert Huth, and Charlton Athletic's Jamaican international striker Jason Euell were all signed in the closing days of the transfer window.

First Team coach Steve Round left the club on 15 December 2006 following a "difference in philosophy and ideas" with Gareth Southgate, and was replaced by Colin Cooper.

Lee Dong-Gook arrived from Pohang Steelers in the January transfer window, while Ray Parlour, Ugo Ehiogu and Massimo Maccarone all left the club for free.

Middlesbrough's form in 2006–07 was indifferent. Positive results such as a surprising home victory over reigning Premier League Champions Chelsea were coupled with the team losing away from home to all three newly promoted Premiership sides this season. Indeed, they registered their first away win of the season at struggling Charlton in mid-January, their first away win since April of the year before. They comprehensively beat Bolton Wanderers 5–1 at home in January, their biggest victory of the season. Middlesbrough eventually finished twelfth in league on 46 points, with the fact that they were 8 points away from a UEFA Cup spot and 8 points away from getting relegated neatly summing up their season.

In the cups, Boro suffered an embarrassing home defeat in the League Cup to Football League Two side Notts County in the second round. Their FA Cup run was decidedly longer, although this was partly due to them being taken to a replay in every round they played. Middlesbrough were eventually knocked out by Premier League champions-elect and eventual Cup finalists, Manchester United at Old Trafford after a narrow 1–0 defeat in their quarter-final replay.

2007–08 has been similarly uninspiring. Middlesbrough have never been in the hunt for European qualification (their last hope of a UEFA Cup place disappearing when they were eliminated from the FA Cup in the quarter-finals by championship side Cardiff City) and indeed have spent almost all of the season in the bottom half of the table. With two games remaining, they occupy 15th place and are four points clear of the relegation zone, needing only a win in their penultimate game of the Premier League season to confirm their survival.

In the 2008/09 season, despite a positive start to the campaign, Middlesbrough were relegated in abject fashion.

The following season back in the Championship, Gareth Southgate was sacked despite the team sitting in fourth place. Gordon Strachan was confirmed as his replacement on 26 October 2009. However the club's form got worse and they finished mid-table at the end of the 2009–10 season.

== Briefly back in the top flight (2010–present) ==
Middlesbrough started the 2010–11 season as promotion favourites, but had a poor start and Strachan resigned on 18 October, to be replaced by former player Tony Mowbray. However Mowbray left during the 2013–14 season, to be replaced by Aitor Karanka, a former Spain international defender and assistant coach at Real Madrid to José Mourinho. Karanka signed a two-year contract and he guided the club back to the Premier League after finishing second in the 2015–16 season.

Karanka was sacked in March 2017 after a poor run of form, and Middlesbrough were eventually relegated after just one season back in the Premier League finishing in 19th place.

Since then the club has appointed both Garry Monk who had a brief spell, and Tony Pulis, but have been no nearer to returning to the top flight. Middlesbrough appointed Jonathan Woodgate as their new manager at the start of the 2019–20 season.

Following a pre-season Woodgate along with his backroom staff including favourite former Karanka stalwart Leo Percovich and Woodgate's former Spurs teammate Robbie Keane, Middlesbrough started off the season with a 3–3 draw against Luton on Sky Sports on a Friday night. The "golden thread" that was mooted in Woodgate's unveiling alongside former FA senior adviser Adrian Bevington, which called for an attacking and intense pressing style looked like it might succeed. Utilising new youth players like Lewis Wing, Hayden Coulson and Djed Spence, Woodgate mixed old heads and youthful exuberance. Given the enthusiasm following Woodgate's appointment was less than spectacular, it seemed like the Boro faithful were ready to give the local lad, and his new style a chance.

Middlesbrough went into September with just one victory in seven games, including being dumped out of the League Cup on penalties by Crewe Alexandra. Things didn't get much better for the club in September with another 3 defeats and just 1 win since the start of the season which saw Boro finding themselves languishing just outside the relegation places in 18th. The club picked up just 2 more points in October and Woodgate's men found themselves in 22nd place by the end of October with a grim total of just 12 points, having yet to win away from home in the league. This period was made worse by Woodgate's ongoing PR campaign that the table at that time was in fact not a fair reflection and Boro were actually playing a lot better than the results suggested, much to frustration of fans who had seen nothing to suggest that the team were capable of competing at a higher level.

Much of the autumn was a similar story with the club flattering to deceive and wins were still hard to come by. Draws against fellow strugglers, Hull and QPR were marred by a couple of poor performances against Leeds and Derby with the club losing empathically to Woodgate's former club 4–0 away from home. Following the game Woodgate further irked the Boro faithful with more ill-timed comments praising the Leeds team.

As Middlesbrough entered the winter period, a time when the club always seemed to under perform, they hit a purple patch. Woodgate's men took 13 points from a possible 18 and finished the year as the most in form team in the division for December earning the manager the Manager of the Month award. The period included a rare away win at promotion chasing WBA, which saw a wonder goal from Ashley Fletcher. There were strong signs of improvement for the young team and Boro went into 2020 with renewed belief and optimism.
