= 1974–75 Middlesbrough F.C. season =

Middlesbrough
1974–75 season
- Manager: Jack Charlton
- Stadium: Ayresome Park
- First Division: 7th
- FA Cup: Sixth round (eliminated by Birmingham City)
- League Cup: Fifth round (eliminated by Manchester United)

The 1974–75 season was Middlesbrough's 92nd season in existence, and their first season back in the First Division, in which they finished 7th. Along with the First Division, they competed in the FA Cup and Football League Cup, being eliminated in the sixth and fifth rounds respectively.

== Competitions ==
=== First Division ===
==== League table ====
| Pos | Team | Pld | W | D | L | GF | GA | GAv | Pts |
|---|---|---|---|---|---|---|---|---|---|
| 5 | Stoke City | 42 | 17 | 15 | 10 | 64 | 48 | 1.333 | 49 |
| 6 | Sheffield United | 42 | 18 | 13 | 11 | 58 | 51 | 1.137 | 49 |
| 7 | Middlesbrough | 42 | 18 | 12 | 12 | 54 | 40 | 1.350 | 48 |
| 8 | Manchester City | 42 | 18 | 10 | 14 | 54 | 54 | 1.000 | 46 |
| 9 | Leeds United | 42 | 16 | 13 | 13 | 57 | 49 | 1.163 | 45 |

Source: World Football
Rules for classification: 1) Points; 2) Goal average; 3) Goals scored

==== Matches ====
First Division match results
| Date | Opponent | Venue | Result F–A | Scorers | Attendance |
|---|---|---|---|---|---|
| 17 August 1974 | Birmingham City | A | 3–0 | Hickton, Foggon (2) | 32,105 |
| 20 August 1974 | Carlisle United | H | 0–2 | | 28,719 |
| 24 August 1974 | Luton Town | H | 1–1 | Mills | 21,478 |
| 27 August 1974 | Carlisle United | A | 1–0 | Armstrong | 18,473 |
| 31 August 1974 | Stoke City | A | 1–1 | Souness | 23,475 |
| 7 September 1974 | Chelsea | H | 1–1 | Maddren | 25,480 |
| 14 September 1974 | Sheffield United | A | 0–1 | | 22,519 |
| 21 September 1974 | Manchester City | H | 3–0 | Mills, Foggon (2) | 30,256 |
| 28 September 1974 | Tottenham Hotspur | A | 2–1 | Armstrong, Mills | 23,282 |
| 5 October 1974 | Wolverhampton Wanderers | H | 2–1 | Hickton, Willey | 27,443 |
| 12 October 1974 | Liverpool | A | 0–2 | | 52,590 |
| 16 October 1974 | Luton Town | A | 1–0 | Foggon | 10,464 |
| 19 October 1974 | Coventry City | H | 4–4 | Souness (2), Mills, Foggon | 25,499 |
| 26 October 1974 | Derby County | A | 3–2 | Hickton, Foggon, Mills | 24,036 |
| 2 November 1974 | West Ham United | A | 0–3 | | 28,915 |
| 9 November 1974 | Newcastle United | H | 0–0 | | 38,380 |
| 16 November 1974 | Leeds United | A | 2–2 | Boam, Smith | 45,488 |
| 23 November 1974 | Queen's Park Rangers | H | 1–3 | Foggon | 27,530 |
| 30 November 1974 | Arsenal | A | 0–2 | | 25,283 |
| 7 December 1974 | Ipswich Town | H | 3–0 | Souness (2), Foggon | 23,735 |
| 10 December 1974 | Leicester City | H | 3–0 | Foggon (2), Willey | 22,699 |
| 14 December 1974 | Birmingham City | H | 3–0 | Foggon, Hickton (pen.), Page (o.g.) | 23,737 |
| 21 December 1974 | Burnley | A | 1–1 | Armstrong | 17,637 |
| 26 December 1974 | Sheffield United | H | 1–0 | Armstrong | 31,879 |
| 28 December 1974 | Everton | A | 1–1 | Maddren | 41,105 |
| 11 January 1975 | Ipswich Town | A | 0–2 | | 24,720 |
| 18 January 1975 | Arsenal | H | 0–0 | | 27,996 |
| 1 February 1975 | Newcastle United | A | 1–2 | Hickton | 42,514 |
| 8 February 1975 | West Ham United | H | 0–0 | | 29,179 |
| 22 February 1975 | Leeds United | H | 0–1 | | 39,500 |
| 25 February 1975 | Queen's Park Rangers | A | 0–0 | | 18,487 |
| 1 March 1975 | Stoke City | H | 2–0 | Hickton, Foggon | 25,766 |
| 15 March 1975 | Tottenham Hotspur | H | 3–0 | Hickton, Souness (2) | 25,637 |
| 18 March 1975 | Everton | H | 2–0 | Mills, Armstrong | 32,813 |
| 22 March 1975 | Chelsea | A | 2–1 | Willey, Craggs | 22,240 |
| 28 March 1975 | Manchester City | A | 1–2 | Mills | 37,772 |
| 29 March 1975 | Burnley | H | 2–0 | Murdoch, Foggon | 28,922 |
| 5 April 1975 | Derby County | H | 1–1 | Mills | 30,066 |
| 9 April 1975 | Leicester City | A | 0–1 | | 24,531 |
| 12 April 1975 | Wolverhampton Wanderers | A | 0–2 | | 21,066 |
| 19 April 1975 | Liverpool | H | 1–0 | Foggon | 33,982 |
| 26 April 1975 | Coventry City | A | 2–0 | Foggon, Hickton | 18,121 |

=== FA Cup ===
FA Cup match results
| Round | Date | Opponent | Venue | Result F–A | Scorers | Attendance |
|---|---|---|---|---|---|---|
| Third round | 4 January 1975 | Wycombe Wanderers | A | 0–0 | | 12,200 |
| Third round replay | 7 January 1975 | Wycombe Wanderers | H | 1–0 | Armstrong (pen.) | 30,128 |
| Fourth round | 25 January 1975 | Sunderland | H | 3–1 | Murdoch, Hickton (2, 2 pens.) | 39,400 |
| Fifth round | 15 February 1975 | Peterborough United | A | 1–1 | Mills | 25,742 |
| Fifth round replay | 18 February 1975 | Peterborough United | H | 2–0 | Foggon (2) | 34,303 |
| Sixth round | 8 March 1975 | Birmingham City | A | 0–1 | | 47,260 |

=== League Cup ===
League Cup match results
| Round | Date | Opponent | Venue | Result F–A | Scorers | Attendance |
|---|---|---|---|---|---|---|
| Second round | 11 September 1974 | Tottenham Hotspur | A | 4–0 | Smith, Mills, Hickton (pen.), Armstrong | 15,216 |
| Third round | 8 October 1974 | Leicester City | H | 1–0 | Mills | 23,901 |
| Fourth round | 12 November 1974 | Liverpool | H | 1–0 | Maddren | 24,906 |
| Fifth round | 4 December 1974 | Manchester United | A | 0–0 | | 36,005 |
| Fifth round replay | 18 December 1974 | Manchester United | H | 0–3 | | 49,501 |

== Appearances and goals ==
Numbers in parentheses denote appearances made as a substitute.
Key to positions: GK – Goalkeeper; DF – Defender; MF – Midfielder; FW – Forward

Players' appearances and goals by competition
| Pos. | Nat. | Name | League | | FA Cup | | League Cup | | Total | |
| Pos. | Nat. | Name | Apps | Goals | Apps | Goals | Apps | Goals | Apps | Goals |
|---|---|---|---|---|---|---|---|---|---|---|
| GK | NIR | Jim Platt | 42 | 0 | 6 | 0 | 5 | 0 | 53 | 0 |
| DF | ENG | Willie Maddren | 42 | 2 | 6 | 0 | 5 | 1 | 53 | 3 |
| DF | ENG | Stuart Boam | 42 | 1 | 6 | 0 | 5 | 0 | 53 | 1 |
| MF | ENG | David Armstrong | 42 | 5 | 6 | 1 | 5 | 1 | 53 | 7 |
| FW | ENG | Alan Foggon | 41 | 16 | 6 | 2 | 5 | 0 | 52 | 18 |
| DF | ENG | John Craggs | 41 | 1 | 6 | 0 | 4 | 0 | 51 | 1 |
| FW | ENG | John Hickton | 39 | 8 | 6 | 2 | 5 | 1 | 50 | 11 |
| MF | SCO | Bobby Murdoch | 39 | 1 | 4 | 1 | 4 | 0 | 47 | 2 |
| MF | SCO | Graeme Souness | 38 | 7 | 5 | 0 | 4 | 0 | 47 | 7 |
| FW | ENG | David Mills | 36 | 8 | 6 | 1 | 3 | 2 | 45 | 11 |
| DF | ENG | Frank Spraggon | 31 | 0 | 6 | 0 | 4 | 0 | 41 | 1 |
| FW | ENG | Alan Willey | 7 (9) | 3 | 1 (2) | 0 | 1 (1) | 0 | 9 (12) | 3 |
| FW | ENG | Malcolm Smith | 4 (6) | 1 | 0 | 0 | 2 (1) | 1 | 6 (7) | 2 |
| MF | ENG | Peter Brine | 3 (4) | 0 | 1 (2) | 0 | 0 | 0 | 4 (6) | 0 |
| DF | ENG | Terry Cooper | 9 | 0 | 0 | 0 | 0 | 0 | 9 | 0 |
| DF | ENG | Brian Taylor | 3 (4) | 0 | 0 | 0 | 1 (1) | 0 | 4 (5) | 0 |
| MF | ENG | Harry Charlton | 1 | 0 | 1 | 0 | 1 | 0 | 3 | 0 |
| DF | SCO | Tony McAndrew | 1 | 0 | 0 | 0 | 0 | 0 | 1 | 0 |
| FW | ENG | Tommy Paterson | 1 | 0 | 0 | 0 | 0 | 0 | 1 | 0 |
| DF | ENG | Peter Creamer | 0 | 0 | 0 | 0 | 1 | 0 | 1 | 0 |
| FW | ENG | Billy Woof | 0 (1) | 0 | 0 | 0 | 0 | 0 | 0 (1) | 0 |
