= List of Middlesbrough F.C. records and statistics =

This article contains the honours, records and statistics of Middlesbrough Football Club. This article lists all of the major honours won by Middlesbrough since their foundation. This list also lists the major playing honours including top goalscorer and most appearances. The Club records including record transfer fees are shown below as are international player honours.

Middlesbrough are an English professional association football club based in Middlesbrough, in the Tees Valley, who currently play in the EFL Championship. The club was founded in 1876 and have played at their current home ground, the Riverside Stadium, since 1995. Middlesbrough were founding members of the Premier League in 1992. They have won one major trophy in their history: the 2004 Football League Cup.

== Honours ==
=== Domestic ===
==== League ====
- Football League Second Division / Football League Division One

Champions 1926–27, 1928–29, 1973–74, 1994–95; runners up 1901–02, 1991–92, 1997–98, 2015–16

- Football League Third Division

Runners up 1966–67, 1986–87

- Northern League

Champions 1893–94, 1894–95, 1896–97; runners up 1890–91, 1891–92, 1897–98

==== Cup ====
- League Cup

Winners 2003–04; runners up 1996–97, 1997–98

- FA Cup

Runners up 1996–97

- FA Amateur Cup

Winners 1894–95, 1897–98

- Zenith Data Systems Cup

Runners up 1990

=== International ===
- UEFA Cup

Runners up 2005–06

- Anglo-Scottish Cup

Winners 1975

- Kirin Cup

Winners 1980

== Player records ==
=== Appearances ===
Mark Schwarzer, eighth in Middlesbrough's all-time appearances table.

- Youngest first-team player – 16 years and 72 days

Nathan Wood (vs Notts County 14 August 2018)

- Oldest first-team player – 40 years and 68 days

Dimitrios Konstantopoulos (vs Newport County 5 February 2019)

- Most consecutive appearances – 305

David Armstrong, between March 1973 and August 1980

- Most appearances

As of 22 May 2008. Competitive matches only, appearances as substitutes in brackets.

#	Name	Years	League	FA Cup	League Cup	Other	Total
1	(England) Tim Williamson	1902–1923	563 (0)	39 (0)	0 (0)	0 (0)	602 (0)
2	(England) Gordon Jones	1960–1973	457 (5)	40 (0)	26 (0)	4 (0)	527 (5)
3	(England) John Hickton	1966–1977	532(20)	37 (0)	26 (4)	15 (2)	473 (26)
4	(England) John Craggs	1971–1982	409	33	31	15	488
5	(Northern Ireland) Jim Platt	1971–1983	401	34	33	13	481
6	(England) George Camsell	1925–1939	418	35	0 (0)	0 (0)	453
7	(England) Jacky Carr	1910–1930	421	28	0 (0)	0 (0)	449
8	(Australia) Mark Schwarzer	1997–2008	367	32	26	21	446
9	(England) David Armstrong	1971–1981	359	29	28	15	431
10=	(England) Tony Mowbray	1982–1992	348	23	29	24	424
10=	(England) Stephen Pears	1983–1995	339	25	32	28	424

=== Goalscorers ===
- Most goals in a season – 63

George Camsell (Second Division, 1926–1927)

- Most League goals in a season – 59

George Camsell (Second Division, 1926–1927)

- Most goals in a single match – 5

John Wilkie, vs Gainsborough Trinity, 2 March 1901
Andy Wilson, vs Nottingham Forest, 6 October 1923
James McClelland, vs Leeds United, 9 January 1926
George Camsell, vs Manchester City, 25 December 1926
George Camsell, vs Aston Villa, 9 September 1935
Brian Clough, vs Brighton and Hove Albion, 23 August 1958

- Most goals in the League – 325

George Camsell, 1925–1939

- Most goals in the FA Cup – 20

George Camsell, 1925–1939

- Most goals in the League Cup – 13

John Hickton, 1966–1978

- Most goals in European competition – 8

Mark Viduka, 2004–2007

- Oldest goalscorer – 38 years and 2 months

Bryan Robson, vs Port Vale, 26 March 1995

- Youngest goalscorer – 17 years and 64 days

Arthur Horsfield, vs Grimsby Town, 17 April 1963

- Youngest hat-trick scorer – 20 years and 6 days

Tony McAndrew, vs Sheffield United, 17 April 1976

- Top goalscorers

As of 29 January 2008. Competitive matches only, appearances including substitutes appear in brackets.

#	Name	Years	League	FA Cup	League Cup	Other	Total
1	(England) George Camsell	1925–1939	325 (418)	20 (35)	0 (0)	0 (0)	345 (453)
2	(England) George Elliott	1909–1925	203 (344)	10 (21)	0 (0)	0 (0)	213 (365)
3	(England) Brian Clough	1955–1961	197 (213)	5 (8)	2 (1)	0 (0)	204 (222)
4	(England) John Hickton	1966–1977	159 (415)	13 (37)	13 (30)	7 (17)	192 (499)
5	(England) Micky Fenton	1932–1950	147 (240)	15 (29)	0 (0)	0 (0)	162 (269)
6	(Republic of Ireland) Bernie Slaven	1985–1992	118 (307)	4 (19)	10 (28)	14 (27)	146 (381)
7	(England) Alan Peacock	1955–1964	125 (218)	8 (13)	8 (7)	0 (0)	141 (238)
8	(England) David Mills	1969–1985	90 (328)	10 (29)	8 (24)	3 (17)	111 (398)
9	(England) Wilf Mannion	1936–1954	99 (341)	11 (27)	0 (0)	0 (0)	110 (368)
10	(England) Billy Pease	1926–1933	99 (221)	3 (17)	0 (0)	0 (0)	102 (238)

=== International ===
Statistics relate to international caps gained while at the club.

- Most capped player

Mark Schwarzer – 51 for Australia

- Most capped player for England

Wilf Mannion – 26

=== Highest transfer fees ===
As not all transfer details are made public, undisclosed transfer fees are not included in the tables, however reported media estimates of notable fees are included below to give a general idea. Fees are listed as the highest total that the fee could rise to.

==== Paid ====
Updated 30 March 2025.

#	Name	Fee	Purchased from	Date	Ref
1	(Democratic Republic of the Congo) Britt Assombalonga	£15m	(England) Nottingham Forest	July 2017	
2	(Brazil) Afonso Alves	£12.8m	(Netherlands) SC Heerenveen	January 2008	
3	(Netherlands) Marten de Roon	£11.75m	(Italy) Atalanta B.C.	July 2016	
4=	(Denmark) Martin Braithwaite	£9m	(France) Toulouse	July 2017	
4=	(Scotland) Jordan Rhodes	£9m	(England) Blackburn Rovers	February 2016	
6	(Italy) Massimo Maccarone	£8.15m	(Italy) Empoli	July 2002	
7	(England) Ugo Ehiogu	£8m	(England) Aston Villa	October 2000	
8	(Nigeria) Yakubu	£7.5m	(England) Portsmouth	July 2005	
9=	(Italy) Fabrizio Ravanelli	£7m	(Italy) Juventus	July 1996	
9=	(England) Jonathan Woodgate	£7m	(Spain) Real Madrid	April 2007	
9=	(England) George Saville	£7m	(England) Millwall F.C.	August 2018	
12=	(England) Gareth Southgate	£6.5m	(England) Aston Villa	July 2001	
12=	(England) Ashley Fletcher	£6.5m	(England) West Ham United	July 2017	
14=	(Brazil) Juninho Paulista	£6m	(Spain) Atlético Madrid	July 2002	
14=	(Germany) Robert Huth	£6m	(England) Chelsea	August 2006	
14=	(Egypt) Mido	£6m	(England) Tottenham Hotspur	August 2007	
14=	(England) Morgan Whittaker	£6m	(England) Plymouth Argyle	January 2025	

==== Received ====
Updated 30 March 2025.

#	Name	Fee	Sold to	Date	Ref
1	(Spain) Adama Traoré	£18m	(England) Wolverhampton Wanderers	August 2018	
2	(Ivory Coast) Emmanuel Latte Lath	£17.47m	(United States) Atlanta United	February 2025	
3	(England) Ben Gibson	£15m	(England) Burnley F.C.	August 2018	
4	(Netherlands) Marten de Roon	£13m	(Italy) Atalanta B.C.	August 2017	
5=	(Brazil) Juninho Paulista	£12m	(Spain) Atlético Madrid	July 1997	
5=	(England) Stewart Downing	£12m	(England) Aston Villa	July 2009	
7	(Nigeria) Yakubu	£11.25m	(England) Everton	August 2007	
8	(England) Chuba Akpom	£10.5m	(Netherlands) AFC Ajax	August 2023	
9	(England) Patrick Bamford	£10m	(England) Leeds United	July 2018	
10	(England) Morgan Rogers	£8m	(England) Aston Villa	February 2024	
11=	(England) Paul Merson	£7m	(England) Aston Villa	September 1998	
11=	(Brazil) Afonso Alves	£7m	(Qatar) Al-Sadd	September 2009	
13=	(England) Luke Young	£6m	(England) Aston Villa	August 2008	
13=	(Germany) Robert Huth	£6m	(England) Stoke City	August 2009	
15	(England) Nick Barmby	£5.75m	(England) Everton	October 1996	
16	(Germany) Christian Ziege	£5.5m	(England) Liverpool	August 2000	
17	(Italy) Fabrizio Ravanelli	£5.25m	(France) Olympique de Marseille	August 1997	
18	(Turkey) Tuncay	£5m	(England) Stoke City	August 2009	
19	(Brazil) Emerson Moisés Costa	£4.2m	(Spain) CD Tenerife	January 1998	
20	(England) Lee Cattermole	£4m	(England) Wigan Athletic	July 2008	
21=	(France) Christian Karembeu	£3.5m	(Greece) Olympiacos	August 2001	
21=	(England) Lee Tomlin	£3.5m	(England) Bournemouth	August 2015	

===== Undisclosed fees =====
The following are media estimates of notable undisclosed fees. The official fees remain unknown.

Name	Fee	Sold to	Date	Ref
(England) Jonathan Woodgate	£7–8m	(England) Tottenham Hotspur	January 2008	

== Club records ==
=== Wins ===
- Record League win – 9–0

vs Brighton & Hove Albion, Second Division, 23 August 1958

- Record FA Cup win – 11–0

vs Scarborough, 4 October 1890

- Record League Cup win – 7–0

vs Hereford United, 18 September 1996

- Record European win – 4–1

vs FC Basel, UEFA Cup, 6 April 2006

- 'Record Away Win - 7-1

vs Blackburn Rovers, 29 November 1947 and Derby County, 29 August 1959

- Most League wins in a season – 28

in the Third Division, 1986-87

- Fewest League wins in a season – 5

in the Premier League, 2016-17

=== Defeats ===
- Record League defeat – 0–9

vs Blackburn Rovers, Second Division, 6 November 1954

- Record FA Cup defeat – 1–8

vs Hebburn Argyle, 12 December 1896

- Record League Cup defeat – 1-6

vs Chelsea, 23 January 2024

- Record European defeat – 0–4

vs Sevilla, UEFA Cup, 10 May 2006 (Match Details)

- Record Home Defeat - Five goal margin 1-6

vs Arsenal, 24 April 1999
and 0-5
vs Bury, 12 February 1910; Huddersfield Town, 25 August 1962; Chelsea, 18 October 2008; West Bromwich Albion, 19 September 2009

- Most League defeats in a season – 27

in the First Division, 1923-24

- Fewest League defeats in a season – 4

in the Second Division, 1973-74

=== Goals ===
- Most League goals scored in one season – 122

in 42 matches, Second Division, 1926-1927

- Fewest League goals scored in one season – 28

in 38 matches, Premier League, 2008-2009

- Most League goals conceded in one season – 91

in 42 matches, First Division, 1953-1954

- Fewest League goals conceded in one season – 24

in 34 matches, Second Division, 1901-1902

=== Points ===
- Most points earned in a season (3 for a win) – 94

in 46 matches, Third Division, 1986-1987

- Fewest points earned in a season (3 for a win) – 28

in 38 matches, Premier League, 2016-2017

- Most points earned in a season (2 for a win) – 65

in 42 matches, Second Division, 1973-1974

- Fewest points earned in a season (2 for a win) – 22

in 42 matches, First Division, 1923-1924

=== Sequences ===
- Longest sequence of League wins – 9

in the Second Division, 1973–74

- Longest sequence without a League win – 19

in the First Division, 1981–82

- Longest sequence of League defeats – 8

in the Second Division, 1954–55
in the Premier League, 1995–96

- Longest sequence of away League defeats – 12

in the Premier League, 2008–09

- Longest sequence of unbeaten League matches – 24

in the Second Division, 1973–74

- Longest sequence of draws – 8

in the Second Division, 1970–71

- Longest sequence of League Cleansheets – 9

in the Football League Championship, 2015–16

=== Attendances ===
- Highest attendance at the Riverside Stadium – 34,836

vs Norwich City, Premier League, 28 December 2004)

- Lowest attendance at the Riverside – 3,918

vs Northampton Town, League Cup, 11 September 2001

- Highest attendance at Ayresome Park – 53,802

vs Newcastle United, First Division, 27 December 1949

- Lowest attendance at Ayresome Park – 1,633

vs Brescia Calcio, Anglo-Italian Cup, 22 December 1993
