= List of Middlesbrough F.C. seasons =

Boro's League Positions since entry to the English Football League

This is a list of seasons played by Middlesbrough Football Club in English and European football, from 1883, when the club first entered the FA Cup, to the most recent completed season. Middlesbrough Football Club were founded on 18 February 1876, by members of Middlesbrough Cricket Club. For the first years of their existence Middlesbrough participated in competitions such as the Sheffield Cup and the Cleveland Association Challenge Cup. The club have won only one major trophy in their professional history, the Football League Cup in 2004. Most of Middlesbrough's League existence has been in the top two tiers; they were relegated to the Third Division twice in 1966 and 1986, but each time they bounced back as runners-up the following season.

This list details the club's achievements in all competitions, and the top scorers for each season. Records of competitions such as the North Riding Senior Cup are not included due to them being played against lower league opposition and reserve sides.

== Seasons ==
| Season | League record | | | | | | | | | FA Cup | League Cup | Europe | Other | Top scorer(s) | |
| Season | Div (Level) | Pos | Pld | W | D | L | GF | GA | Pts | FA Cup | League Cup | Europe | Other | Player(s) | Goals |
|---|---|---|---|---|---|---|---|---|---|---|---|---|---|---|---|
| 1883–84 | n/a | | | | | | | | | R1 | | | | | |
| 1884–85 | n/a | | | | | | | | | R4 | | | | | |
| 1885–86 | n/a | | | | | | | | | R5 | | | | | |
| 1886–87 | n/a | | | | | | | | | R2 | | | | | |
| 1887–88 | n/a | | | | | | | | | QF | | | | | |
| 1888–89 | n/a | | | | | | | | | Q1 | | | | | |
| 1889–90 | NL (n/a) | 6th | 18 | 8 | 3 | 7 | 42 | 37 | 19 | Q1 | | | | | |
| 1890–91 | NL (n/a) | 2nd | 14 | 8 | 3 | 3 | 33 | 17 | 19 | Q3 | | | | | |
| 1891–92 | NL (n/a) | 2nd | 16 | 13 | 0 | 3 | 33 | 13 | 26 | R2 | | | | | |
| 1892–93 | NL (n/a) | 4th | 10 | 4 | 0 | 6 | 17 | 17 | 8 | R2 | | | | | |
| 1893–94 | NL (n/a) | 1st | 14 | 11 | 1 | 2 | 51 | 16 | 23 | R1 | | | | | |
| 1894–95 | NL (n/a) | 1st | 18 | 12 | 5 | 1 | 58 | 17 | 29 | R2 | | | FA Amateur Cup; Winners | | |
| 1895–96 | NL (n/a) | 3rd | 16 | 8 | 4 | 4 | 28 | 22 | 20 | Q2 | | | | | |
| 1896–97 | NL (n/a) | 1st | 16 | 11 | 4 | 1 | 36 | 15 | 26 | Q1 | | | FA Amateur Cup; SF | | |
| 1897–98 | NL (n/a) | 2nd | 16 | 9 | 4 | 3 | 42 | 22 | 22 | Q5 | | | FA Amateur Cup; Winners | | |
| 1898–99 | NL (n/a) | 3rd | 16 | 7 | 4 | 5 | 29 | 27 | 18 | Q1 | | | | | |
| 1899–1900 | Div 2 (2) | 14th | 34 | 8 | 8 | 18 | 39 | 69 | 24 | Q1 | | | | Eddie Pugh | 7 |
| 1900–01 | Div 2 (2) | 6th | 34 | 15 | 7 | 12 | 50 | 40 | 37 | QF | | | | Sandy Robertson | 16 |
| 1901–02 | Div 2 (2) | 2nd | 34 | 23 | 5 | 6 | 90 | 24 | 51 | R1 | | | | Jack Brearley | 23 |
| 1902–03 | Div 1 (1) | 13th | 34 | 14 | 5 | 15 | 43 | 50 | 32 | R1 | | | | Sandy Robertson | 8 |
| 1903–04 | Div 1 (1) | 10th | 34 | 9 | 12 | 13 | 46 | 47 | 30 | QF | | | | Alex Brown | 17 |
| 1904–05 | Div 1 (1) | 15th | 34 | 9 | 8 | 17 | 36 | 56 | 26 | R1 | | | | Harry Astley | 5 |
| 1905–06 | Div 1 (1) | 18th | 38 | 10 | 11 | 17 | 56 | 71 | 31 | R3 | | | | Alf Common | 24 |
| 1906–07 | Div 1 (1) | 11th | 38 | 15 | 6 | 17 | 56 | 63 | 36 | R2 | | | | Steve Bloomer | 20 |
| 1907–08 | Div 1 (1) | 6th | 38 | 17 | 7 | 14 | 54 | 45 | 41 | R1 | | | | Steve Bloomer Sammy Cail | 12 |
| 1908–09 | Div 1 (1) | 9th | 38 | 14 | 9 | 15 | 59 | 53 | 37 | R1 | | | | Jack Hall | 18 |
| 1909–10 | Div 1 (1) | 17th | 38 | 11 | 9 | 18 | 56 | 73 | 37 | R1 | | | | Jack Hall | 12 |
| 1910–11 | Div 1 (1) | 16th | 38 | 11 | 10 | 17 | 49 | 63 | 32 | R3 | | | | George Elliott | 10 |
| 1911–12 | Div 1 (1) | 7th | 38 | 16 | 8 | 14 | 56 | 45 | 40 | R2 | | | | George Elliott | 19 |
| 1912–13 | Div 1 (1) | 16th | 38 | 11 | 10 | 17 | 55 | 69 | 32 | R3 | | | | George Elliott | 25 |
| 1913–14 | Div 1 (1) | 3rd | 38 | 19 | 5 | 14 | 77 | 60 | 43 | R1 | | | | George Elliott | 31 |
| 1914–15 | Div 1 (1) | 12th | 38 | 13 | 12 | 13 | 62 | 74 | 38 | R2 | | | | Walter Tinsley | 26 |
| 1915–18 | No competitive football was played between 1915 and 1919 due to World War I | | | | | | | | | | | | | | |
| 1919 | NVL (n/a) | 1st | 14 | 9 | 2 | 3 | 28 | 12 | | | | | | George Elliott | 20 |
| 1919–20 | Div 1 (1) | 13th | 42 | 15 | 10 | 17 | 61 | 65 | 40 | R4 | | | | George Elliott | 34 |
| 1920–21 | Div 1 (1) | 8th | 42 | 17 | 12 | 13 | 53 | 53 | 46 | R1 | | | | George Elliott | 26 |
| 1921–22 | Div 1 (1) | 8th | 42 | 16 | 14 | 12 | 79 | 69 | 46 | R1 | | | | Andy Wilson | 32 |
| 1922–23 | Div 1 (1) | 18th | 42 | 13 | 10 | 19 | 57 | 63 | 36 | R2 | | | | George Elliott | 23 |
| 1923–24 | Div 1 (1) | 22nd | 42 | 7 | 8 | 27 | 37 | 60 | 22 | R1 | | | | Andy Wilson | 8 |
| 1924–25 | Div 2 (2) | 13th | 42 | 10 | 19 | 13 | 36 | 44 | 39 | R1 | | | | Ian Dickson Owen Williams | 7 |
| 1925–26 | Div 2 (2) | 9th | 42 | 21 | 2 | 19 | 77 | 68 | 44 | R4 | | | | James McClelland | 38 |
| 1926–27 | Div 2 (2) | 1st | 42 | 27 | 8 | 7 | 122 | 60 | 62 | R5 | | | | George Camsell | 63 |
| 1927–28 | Div 1 (1) | 22nd | 42 | 11 | 15 | 16 | 81 | 88 | 37 | R5 | | | | George Camsell | 37 |
| 1928–29 | Div 2 (2) | 1st | 42 | 22 | 11 | 9 | 92 | 57 | 55 | R4 | | | | George Camsell | 33 |
| 1929–30 | Div 1 (1) | 16th | 42 | 16 | 6 | 20 | 82 | 84 | 38 | R5 | | | | George Camsell | 31 |
| 1930–31 | Div 1 (1) | 7th | 42 | 19 | 8 | 15 | 98 | 90 | 46 | R3 | | | | George Camsell | 32 |
| 1931–32 | Div 1 (1) | 18th | 42 | 15 | 8 | 19 | 64 | 89 | 38 | R3 | | | | George Camsell | 20 |
| 1932–33 | Div 1 (1) | 17th | 42 | 14 | 9 | 19 | 63 | 73 | 37 | R5 | | | | George Camsell | 18 |
| 1933–34 | Div 1 (1) | 16th | 42 | 16 | 7 | 19 | 68 | 77 | 39 | R3 | | | | George Camsell | 24 |
| 1934–35 | Div 1 (1) | 20th | 42 | 10 | 14 | 18 | 70 | 90 | 34 | R3 | | | | George Camsell | 14 |
| 1935–36 | Div 1 (1) | 14th | 42 | 15 | 10 | 17 | 84 | 70 | 40 | QF | | | | George Camsell | 32 |
| 1936–37 | Div 1 (1) | 7th | 42 | 19 | 8 | 15 | 74 | 71 | 46 | R3 | | | | Micky Fenton | 22 |
| 1937–38 | Div 1 (1) | 5th | 42 | 19 | 8 | 15 | 72 | 65 | 46 | R5 | | | | Micky Fenton | 26 |
| 1938–39 | Div 1 (1) | 4th | 42 | 20 | 9 | 13 | 93 | 74 | 49 | R4 | | | | Micky Fenton | 35 |
| 1939–40 | Div 1 (n/a) | n/a | 3 | 0 | 1 | 2 | 3 | 8 | | | | | | Micky Fenton | 3 |
| 1939–40 | No competitive football was played between 1939 and 1946 due to World War II | | | | | | | | | | | | | | |
| 1939–40 | NERL (n/a) | | 20 | 8 | 4 | 8 | 48 | 43 | | | | | | Micky Fenton | 26 |
| 1940–41 | LN (n/a) | | 24 | 13 | 1 | 10 | 68 | 64 | | | | | | George Stobbart | 30 |
| 1941–42 | LN (n/a) | | 18 | 6 | 3 | 9 | 44 | 54 | | | | | | J Robinson | 9 |
| 1941–42 | LN (n/a) | | 18 | 7 | 4 | 7 | 37 | 36 | | | | | | PT Taylor | 10 |
| 1942–43 | LN (n/a) | | 18 | 4 | 4 | 10 | 30 | 50 | | | | | | George Stobbart | 8 |
| 1942–43 | LN (n/a) | | 18 | 5 | 0 | 13 | 31 | 69 | | | | | | P Bowers | 6 |
| 1943–44 | LN (n/a) | | 18 | 4 | 6 | 8 | 35 | 52 | | | | | | George Stobbart | 12 |
| 1943–44 | LN (n/a) | | 21 | 6 | 4 | 11 | 41 | 51 | | | | | | George Stobbart | 11 |
| 1944–45 | LN (n/a) | | 18 | 5 | 3 | 10 | 34 | 57 | | | | | | George Stobbart | 10 |
| 1944–45 | LN (n/a) | | 24 | 7 | 2 | 15 | 39 | 58 | | | | | | George Stobbart | 23 |
| 1945–46 | LN (n/a) | | 42 | 17 | 9 | 16 | 75 | 87 | | R5 | | | | Micky Fenton | 27 |
| 1946–47 | Div 1 (1) | 11th | 42 | 17 | 8 | 17 | 74 | 68 | 42 | QF | | | | Micky Fenton Wilf Mannion | 23 |
| 1947–48 | Div 1 (1) | 16th | 42 | 14 | 9 | 19 | 71 | 73 | 37 | R5 | | | | Micky Fenton | 29 |
| 1948–49 | Div 1 (1) | 19th | 42 | 11 | 12 | 19 | 46 | 57 | 34 | R3 | | | | Micky Fenton | 12 |
| 1949–50 | Div 1 (1) | 9th | 42 | 20 | 7 | 15 | 59 | 48 | 47 | R4 | | | | Alex McCrae Peter McKennan | 16 |
| 1950–51 | Div 1 (1) | 6th | 42 | 18 | 11 | 13 | 76 | 65 | 47 | R3 | | | | Alex McCrae | 21 |
| 1951–52 | Div 1 (1) | 18th | 42 | 15 | 6 | 21 | 64 | 88 | 36 | R4 | | | | Lindy Delapenha | 17 |
| 1952–53 | Div 1 (1) | 13th | 42 | 14 | 11 | 17 | 70 | 77 | 39 | R3 | | | | Wilf Mannion | 18 |
| 1953–54 | Div 1 (1) | 21st | 42 | 10 | 10 | 22 | 60 | 91 | 30 | R3 | | | | Lindy Delapenha | 18 |
| 1954–55 | Div 2 (2) | 12th | 42 | 18 | 6 | 18 | 73 | 82 | 42 | R3 | | | | Charlie Wayman | 17 |
| 1955–56 | Div 2 (2) | 14th | 42 | 16 | 8 | 18 | 76 | 78 | 40 | R4 | | | | Lindy Delapenha | 18 |
| 1956–57 | Div 2 (2) | 6th | 42 | 19 | 10 | 13 | 84 | 60 | 48 | R4 | | | | Brian Clough | 40 |
| 1957–58 | Div 2 (2) | 7th | 42 | 19 | 7 | 16 | 83 | 74 | 45 | R4 | | | | Brian Clough | 42 |
| 1958–59 | Div 2 (2) | 13th | 42 | 15 | 10 | 17 | 87 | 71 | 40 | R3 | | | | Brian Clough | 43 |
| 1959–60 | Div 2 (2) | 5th | 42 | 19 | 10 | 13 | 90 | 64 | 48 | R3 | | | | Brian Clough | 40 |
| 1960–61 | Div 2 (2) | 5th | 42 | 18 | 12 | 12 | 83 | 74 | 48 | R3 | R1 | | | Brian Clough | 36 |
| 1961–62 | Div 2 (2) | 12th | 42 | 16 | 7 | 19 | 76 | 72 | 39 | R5 | R3 | | | Alan Peacock | 32 |
| 1962–63 | Div 2 (2) | 4th | 42 | 20 | 9 | 13 | 86 | 85 | 49 | R4 | R2 | | | Alan Peacock | 33 |
| 1963–64 | Div 2 (2) | 10th | 42 | 15 | 11 | 16 | 67 | 52 | 41 | R3 | R2 | | | Ian Gibson | 14 |
| 1964–65 | Div 2 (2) | 17th | 42 | 13 | 9 | 20 | 70 | 76 | 35 | R5 | R2 | | | Jim Irvine | 24 |
| 1965–66 | Div 2 (2) | 21st | 42 | 10 | 13 | 19 | 58 | 86 | 33 | R3 | R3 | | | Jim Irvine | 17 |
| 1966–67 | Div 3 (3) | 2nd | 42 | 23 | 9 | 14 | 87 | 64 | 55 | R3 | R1 | | | John O'Rourke | 30 |
| 1967–68 | Div 2 (2) | 6th | 42 | 17 | 12 | 13 | 60 | 54 | 46 | R4 | R3 | | | John Hickton | 29 |
| 1968–69 | Div 2 (2) | 4th | 42 | 19 | 11 | 12 | 58 | 49 | 49 | R3 | R2 | | | John Hickton | 18 |
| 1969–70 | Div 2 (2) | 4th | 42 | 20 | 10 | 12 | 55 | 45 | 50 | QF | R2 | | Anglo-Italian Cup; English GS | John Hickton | 30 |
| 1970–71 | Div 2 (2) | 7th | 42 | 17 | 14 | 11 | 60 | 43 | 48 | R4 | R3 | | | John Hickton | 27 |
| 1971–72 | Div 2 (2) | 9th | 42 | 19 | 8 | 15 | 50 | 48 | 46 | R5 | R2 | | | John Hickton | 16 |
| 1972–73 | Div 2 (2) | 4th | 42 | 17 | 13 | 12 | 46 | 43 | 47 | R3 | R3 | | | John Hickton | 15 |
| 1973–74 | Div 2 (2) | 1st | 42 | 27 | 11 | 4 | 77 | 30 | 65 | R4 | R3 | | | Alan Foggon | 20 |
| 1974–75 | Div 1 (1) | 7th | 42 | 18 | 12 | 12 | 54 | 40 | 48 | QF | QF | | Texaco Cup; Q | Alan Foggon | 18 |
| 1975–76 | Div 1 (1) | 13th | 42 | 15 | 10 | 17 | 46 | 45 | 40 | R3 | SF | | Anglo-Scottish Cup; Winners | John Hickton | 18 |
| 1976–77 | Div 1 (1) | 12th | 42 | 14 | 13 | 15 | 40 | 45 | 41 | QF | R2 | | Anglo-Scottish Cup; Q | David Mills | 18 |
| 1977–78 | Div 1 (1) | 14th | 42 | 12 | 15 | 15 | 42 | 54 | 39 | QF | R3 | | | David Mills | 16 |
| 1978–79 | Div 1 (1) | 12th | 42 | 15 | 10 | 17 | 57 | 50 | 40 | R3 | R2 | | | Micky Burns | 14 |
| 1979–80 | Div 1 (1) | 9th | 42 | 16 | 12 | 14 | 50 | 44 | 44 | R4 | R3 | | | David Armstrong | 14 |
| 1980–81 | Div 1 (1) | 14th | 42 | 16 | 5 | 21 | 53 | 61 | 37 | R6 | R2 | | Kirin Cup; Winners | Božo Janković | 13 |
| 1981–82 | Div 1 (1) | 22nd | 42 | 8 | 15 | 19 | 34 | 52 | 39 | R3 | R3 | | | Billy Ashcroft Heine Otto Bobby Thomson | 5 |
| 1982–83 | Div 2 (2) | 16th | 42 | 11 | 15 | 16 | 46 | 67 | 48 | R5 | R2 | | | David Shearer | 13 |
| 1983–84 | Div 2 (2) | 17th | 42 | 12 | 13 | 17 | 41 | 47 | 49 | R5 | R1 | | | David Currie | 15 |
| 1984–85 | Div 2 (2) | 19th | 42 | 10 | 10 | 22 | 41 | 57 | 40 | R3 | R1 | | | David Mills | 14 |
| 1985–86 | Div 2 (2) | 21st | 42 | 12 | 9 | 21 | 44 | 53 | 45 | R3 | R1 | | | Gary Rowell | 12 |
| 1986–87 | Div 3 (3) | 2nd | 46 | 28 | 10 | 8 | 67 | 30 | 94 | R3 | R2 | | Associate Members Cup; Northern SF | Bernie Slaven | 21 |
| 1987–88 | Div 2 (2) | 3rd | 44 | 22 | 12 | 10 | 63 | 36 | 78 | R4 | R2 | | Full Members Cup; R1 | Bernie Slaven | 24 |
| 1988–89 | Div 1 (1) | 18th | 38 | 9 | 12 | 17 | 44 | 61 | 39 | R3 | R2 | | Full Members Cup; QF | Bernie Slaven | 18 |
| 1989–90 | Div 2 (2) | 21st | 46 | 13 | 11 | 22 | 52 | 63 | 50 | R3 | R3 | | Full Members Cup; RU | Bernie Slaven | 32 |
| 1990–91 | Div 2 (2) | 7th | 46 | 20 | 9 | 17 | 66 | 47 | 69 | R4 | R4 | | Full Members Cup; Northern R2 | Bernie Slaven | 19 |
| 1991–92 | Div 2 (2) | 2nd | 46 | 23 | 11 | 12 | 58 | 41 | 80 | R5 | SF | | Full Members Cup; Northern QF | Paul Wilkinson | 24 |
| 1992–93 | Prem (1) | 21st | 42 | 11 | 11 | 20 | 54 | 75 | 44 | R4 | R2 | | | Paul Wilkinson | 15 |
| 1993–94 | Div 1 (2) | 9th | 46 | 18 | 13 | 15 | 66 | 54 | 67 | R3 | R3 | | Anglo-Italian Cup; GS | John Hendrie | 20 |
| 1994–95 | Div 1 (2) | 1st | 46 | 23 | 13 | 10 | 67 | 40 | 82 | R3 | R3 | | Anglo-Italian Cup; GS | John Hendrie | 17 |
| 1995–96 | Prem (1) | 12th | 38 | 11 | 10 | 17 | 35 | 50 | 43 | R4 | R4 | | | Nick Barmby | 9 |
| 1996–97 | Prem (1) | 19th | 38 | 10 | 12 | 16 | 51 | 60 | 39 | RU | RU | | | Fabrizio Ravanelli | 31 |
| 1997–98 | Div 1 (2) | 2nd | 46 | 27 | 10 | 9 | 77 | 41 | 91 | R4 | RU | | | Paul Merson | 16 |
| 1998–99 | Prem (1) | 9th | 38 | 12 | 15 | 11 | 48 | 54 | 51 | R3 | R3 | | | Hamilton Ricard | 18 |
| 1999–2000 | Prem (1) | 12th | 38 | 14 | 10 | 14 | 46 | 52 | 52 | R3 | QF | | | Hamilton Ricard | 14 |
| 2000–01 | Prem (1) | 14th | 38 | 9 | 15 | 14 | 44 | 44 | 42 | R4 | R3 | | | Alen Bokšić | 12 |
| 2001–02 | Prem (1) | 12th | 38 | 12 | 9 | 17 | 35 | 47 | 45 | SF | R3 | | | Alen Bokšić | 8 |
| 2002–03 | Prem (1) | 11th | 38 | 13 | 10 | 15 | 48 | 44 | 49 | R3 | R3 | | | Massimo Maccarone | 9 |
| 2003–04 | Prem (1) | 11th | 38 | 13 | 9 | 16 | 44 | 52 | 48 | R4 | WN | | | Juninho Paulista | 9 |
| 2004–05 | Prem (1) | 7th | 38 | 14 | 13 | 11 | 53 | 46 | 55 | R4 | R4 | UEFA Cup; L16 | | Jimmy Floyd Hasselbaink | 16 |
| 2005–06 | Prem (1) | 14th | 38 | 12 | 9 | 17 | 48 | 58 | 45 | SF | QF | UEFA Cup; RU | | Yakubu | 19 |
| 2006–07 | Prem (1) | 12th | 38 | 12 | 10 | 16 | 44 | 49 | 46 | QF | R2 | | | Mark Viduka | 19 |
| 2007–08 | Prem (1) | 13th | 38 | 10 | 12 | 16 | 43 | 53 | 42 | QF | R3 | | | Stewart Downing | 10 |
| 2008–09 | Prem (1) | 19th | 38 | 7 | 11 | 20 | 28 | 57 | 32 | QF | R3 | | | Tuncay Şanlı | 8 |
| 2009–10 | Champ (2) | 11th | 46 | 16 | 14 | 16 | 58 | 50 | 62 | R3 | R2 | | | Adam Johnson | 11 |
| 2010–11 | Champ (2) | 12th | 46 | 17 | 11 | 18 | 68 | 68 | 62 | R3 | R2 | | | Scott McDonald | 14 |
| 2011–12 | Champ (2) | 7th | 46 | 18 | 16 | 12 | 52 | 51 | 70 | R4 | R3 | | | Marvin Emnes | 18 |
| 2012–13 | Champ (2) | 16th | 46 | 18 | 5 | 23 | 61 | 70 | 59 | R5 | QF | | | Scott McDonald | 13 |
| 2013–14 | Champ (2) | 12th | 46 | 16 | 16 | 14 | 62 | 50 | 64 | R3 | R1 | | | Albert Adomah | 12 |
| 2014–15 | Champ (2) | 4th | 46 | 25 | 10 | 11 | 68 | 37 | 85 | R5 | R3 | | | Patrick Bamford | 19 |
| 2015–16 | Champ (2) | 2nd | 46 | 26 | 11 | 9 | 63 | 31 | 89 | R3 | QF | | | Cristhian Stuani | 11 |
| 2016–17 | Prem (1) | 19th | 38 | 5 | 13 | 20 | 27 | 53 | 28 | QF | R2 | | | Álvaro Negredo | 10 |
| 2017–18 | Champ (2) | 5th | 46 | 22 | 10 | 14 | 67 | 45 | 76 | R4 | R4 | | | Britt Assombalonga | 15 |
| 2018–19 | Champ (2) | 7th | 46 | 20 | 13 | 13 | 49 | 41 | 73 | R4 | QF | | | Britt Assombalonga | 14 |
| 2019–20 | Champ (2) | 17th | 46 | 13 | 14 | 19 | 48 | 61 | 53 | R3 | R1 | | | Ashley Fletcher | 13 |
| 2020–21 | Champ (2) | 10th | 46 | 18 | 10 | 18 | 55 | 53 | 64 | R3 | R2 | | | Duncan Watmore | 9 |
| 2021–22 | Champ (2) | 7th | 46 | 20 | 10 | 16 | 59 | 50 | 70 | QF | R1 | | | Matt Crooks | 11 |
| 2022–23 | Champ (2) | 4th | 46 | 22 | 9 | 15 | 84 | 56 | 75 | R3 | R1 | | | Chuba Akpom | 29 |
| 2023–24 | Champ (2) | 8th | 46 | 20 | 9 | 17 | 71 | 62 | 69 | R3 | SF | | | Emmanuel Latte Lath | 18 |
| 2024–25 | Champ (2) | 10th | 46 | 18 | 10 | 18 | 64 | 56 | 64 | R3 | R2 | | | Tommy Conway | 13 |
| 2025–26 | Champ (2) | 5th | 46 | 22 | 14 | 10 | 72 | 47 | 80 | R3 | R1 | | | Morgan Whittaker | 14 |

=== Overall ===
- Seasons spent at Level 1 of the football league system: 61
- Seasons spent at Level 2 of the football league system: 53
- Seasons spent at Level 3 of the football league system: 2
- Seasons spent at Level 4 of the football league system: 0

As of 2025–26 season.

== Key ==
Champions Runners-up Promoted Relegated

League Results

- Div = Division
- Pos = Final position
- Pld = Matches played
- W = Matches won
- D = Matches drawn
- L = Matches lost
- GF = Goals for
- GA = Goals against
- Pts = Points

Divisions

- NL = Northern Football League
- Div 1 = Football League First Division
- Div 2 = Football League Second Division
- Div 3 = Football League Third Division
- Prem = Premier League
- NVL = Northern Victory League
- NERL = North Eastern Regional League
- LN = Football League North
- Champ = EFL Championship
- n/a = Not applicable

Cup Results

- Q = Qualifying round
- Q1 = Qualifying round 1
- Q2 = Qualifying round 2
- Q3 = Qualifying round 3
- Q4 = Qualifying round 4
- Q5 = Qualifying round 5
- R1 = Round 1
- R2 = Round 2
- R3 = Round 3
- R4 = Round 4
- R5 = Round 5
- QF = Quarter-finals
- SF = Semi-finals
- RU = Runners-up
- WN = Winners
- GS = Group Stage
- L16 = Last 16
