= Stan Cummins =

English footballer

Personal information
- Date of birth: 6 December 1958 (age 67)
- Place of birth: Sedgefield, County Durham, England
- Positions: Forward; midfielder

Senior career*
Years	Team	Apps	(Gls)
1975–1979	Middlesbrough	44	(9)
1977	→ Minnesota Kicks (loan)	18	(2)
1979–1983	Sunderland	133	(29)
1981	→ Seattle Sounders (loan)	15	(4)
1983–1984	Crystal Palace	28	(7)
1984–1985	Sunderland	17	(0)
1985–1988	Minnesota Strikers	123	(41)
1988–1989	Kansas City Comets	48	(6)
Total		426	(98)
- * Club domestic league appearances and goals

Stan Cummins (born 6 December 1958 England) is an English former footballer who played as an attacking midfielder or forward.

== Career ==
Cummins began his career with Middlesbrough in 1975 as an apprentice professional. He was coached at youth level by George Wardle, and then by former Scotland and Celtic player Bobby Murdoch. He was voted Boro's Young Player of the Year in 1976. Manager, Jack Charlton, gave him his debut in the old First Division (now the Premier League) against Ipswich Town at Ayresome Park on 27 November 1976. Cummins was only 17 at the time. Cummins signed a professional contract with the club on his 18th birthday. He gained renown as a striker/midfielder. While still only a teenager, Jack Charlton suggested that Cummins would one day be the first player to be sold for one million pounds. However, that was not to be the case, for in 1979 Trevor Francis became the first when Nottingham Forest bought him from Birmingham City. In 1977, Cummins had the honour of playing with 1966 World Cup winner Bobby Charlton in John Hickton's Testimonial Match against Sunderland at Ayresome Park.

In the summer of 1977, at the age of 18, he played for the Minnesota Kicks in the North American Soccer League (NASL). The team won the Western Division Championship during his time there.

In November of '77, Cummins scored his first league goal in Boro's 1–0 win against Aston Villa at Villa Park. By age 19, he established himself in Boro's first team, and played in their F.A. Cup run of 1978. This took them to the semi-final draw for the first time in their one-hundred-and-two year history. It was Ipswich Town v. West Bromwich Albion, and Arsenal v. Middlesbrough or Leyton Orient. In the quarter-final, Boro drew 0–0 with Orient at Ayresome Park, then lost the replay 2–1 at Brisbane Road. In January of that year, Boro beat Newcastle United 4–2 at St. James' Park, and Cummins scored Boro's fourth goal, prompting match commentator Kenneth Wolstenholme to say, "That gives him (Cummins) ten out of ten, and one for neatness".Cummins played against Scotland in Willie Maddren's Testimonial Match prior to their departure for the 1978 World Cup in Argentina. Cummins was voted Boro's Player of the Year, and received his award from Vice Chairman Mike McCullagh.

In December '78, Middlesbrough beat Chelsea 7–2 at Ayresome Park, and Cummins had three assists. In February 1979, he was a member of the England U21 Squad against Wales U21 along with Bryan Robson, Glenn Hoddle, Kenny Sansom, and Terry Butcher, coached by Dave Sexton and Terry Venables.

Cummins used to write a weekly column for Scoop, a soccer magazine, as did Kenny Dalglish, Glenn Hoddle, and Peter Barnes.

Cummins joined Sunderland in November 1979 at the age of 20, for £300,000, the club's most expensive signing in their 100-year history, scoring on his debut in the 3–1 win over Notts. County at Roker Park. He also won the Daily Express National Five-a-side Championship at Wembley Arena that same month. Cummins would also score vital goals for Sunderland in their promotion season of 1979–80. On 9 February 1980 he scored four goals and had one assist in the 5–0 win against Burnley at Roker Park. On 5 April he scored the only goal that beat Newcastle United in the local derby at Roker Park. That record stood for twenty-eight years until Sunderland beat Newcastle United again on home soil on 25 October 2008 when Sunderland won 2–1. He also scored in the 2–0 win against West Ham United to clinch promotion in front of 47,000 fans at Roker Park on 12 May. The following season, he would score the goal which ensured Sunderland's First Division survival away to Liverpool at Anfield in the last game of the season. He was named Sunderland Player of the Year for 1981 and also the North-East of England Outfield Player of the Year for 1981. He was also the only Sunderland player to play in all 46 League and Cup games that season. In the summer of 1981 he returned to the NASL and played for the Seattle Sounders alongside Bruce Rioch and Alan Hudson, winning the Trans-Atlantic Challenge Cup against the New York Cosmos, Glasgow Celtic and Southampton. He also played for the Sounders against the Washington Diplomats featuring Dutch legend Johan Cruyff. In May 1982 Aston Villa won the European Cup beating Bayern Munich 1–0. Three months later in the first fixture of the 1982/83 season Sunderland beat Aston Villa 3–1 at Villa Park, Cummins had two assists and was voted 'Man of the Match'.

In 1983, after his Sunderland contract had expired, Cummins joined Crystal Palace instead of Newcastle United, returning to Sunderland a year later. He had played with Keegan in John Craggs's Testimonial Match in 1982 and enjoyed Keegan's style of play. His second spell at Roker Park was short-lived. He was a member of the Sunderland Squad who got to the 1985 League Cup Final at Wembley Stadium but couldn't play because he was cup-tied. In May 1985 he captained Sunderland to victory over Middlesbrough in the Final of the Bradford City Disaster Fund North East of England Six-a-Side Tournament held at Teesside Park. All of the proceeds went to Bradford City F.C. In all he made 165 appearances for Sunderland. He left the club following relegation in 1985 for the US at the age of 26 and joined the Minnesota Strikers on a three-year contract in the Major Indoor Soccer League (MISL). The Strikers reached the 1986 MISL Championship only to lose 4 games to 3 (best of seven) to the San Diego Sockers. However, they were crowned MISL Eastern Division Champions in 1988 and on 8 April Cummins scored a hat-trick in the Strikers 4–2 victory against the Chicago Sting and he was carried shoulder high from the playing field by his teammates at the end of the game. The club folded at the end of the season and so Cummins joined the Kansas City Comets for the 1988/89 season. He played in all of the Comets games that season along with teammate Greg Ion. An entertaining and skilful player, Cummins' career spanned 14 years, 10 years in the English Football League where he made 251 appearances in both League and Cup Competitions scoring 50 goals, 2 seasons in the NASL and 4 years in the MISL, USA. He retired as a professional player in 1990 and has a UEFA 'B' coaching certificate.
