= John Hogg (disambiguation) =

John Hogg (born 1949) is an Australian politician.

John Hogg may also refer to:

- John Hogg (biologist) (1800–1869), English biologist
- John Hogg, English Catholic martyr, see Richard Hill, Richard Holiday and John Hogg
- John Hogg, vocalist for the rock bands Moke and The Magpie Salute
- Jack Hogg (John Hogg, 1881–1944), English footballer
- John Hogg (footballer, born 1879) (1879–?), Scottish footballer
- Jack Hogg (footballer, born 1931) (John Hogg, 1931–2001), English footballer
- John Hogg (cricketer) (1818–1885), English cricketer
