= Micky Fenton =

English footballer (1913–2003)

Personal information
- Full name: Michael Fenton
- Date of birth: 30 October 1913
- Place of birth: Portrack, Stockton-on-Tees, County Durham, England
- Date of death: 5 February 2003 (aged 89)
- Place of death: Stockton-on-Tees, County Durham, England
- Height: 5 ft 9 in (1.75 m)
- Position: Forward

Youth career
- Portrack Shamrocks
- South Bank East End

Senior career*
Years	Team	Apps	(Gls)
1932–1950	Middlesbrough	240	(137)
Total		240	(137)

International career
1938	England	1	(0)
- * Club domestic league appearances and goals

Michael Fenton (30 October 1913 – 5 February 2003) was an England international footballer for Middlesbrough either side of World War II. A forward, he scored 152 goals in 269 appearances in all competitions.

== Early and personal life ==
Michael Fenton was born on 30 October 1913 in Portrack, Stockton-on-Tees, County Durham. He married Alfreda Davies in 1937. He ran a newsagents in the Roseworth shopping area of Stockton-on-Tees in the 1950s and 1960s.

== Club career ==
Fenton started his professional career with Middlesbrough in 1932, having previously played football with Portrack Shamrocks (Stockton) and South Bank East End (Middlesbrough). He made his debut in 1933, gradually replacing George Camsell as Boro's leading goalscorer. Camsell was top scorer for ten consecutive seasons, though the club would soon become equally reliant on Fenton's goals. The Ayresome Park club struggled in the lower half of the First Division table in the 1933–34, 1934–35, and 1935–36 campaigns. Fenton scored 22 goals in 1936–37, to become the club's top-scorer, as "Boro" rose to seventh place. He then hit 26 goals in 1937–38 and 35 goals in 1938–39 as the club posted top five finishes. the Football League was suspended due to World War II. During the war, he continued to score goals for Middlesbrough. Also, he guested for Port Vale, Notts County, Rochdale, Wolverhampton Wanderers and Blackpool. After the war, despite being wanted by Everton, Fenton returned to Teesside, where he continued his scoring record, ending as top goalscorer for the next four seasons. He scored 23 goals in 1946–47 (level with Wilf Mannion), 29 goals in 1947–48 and 12 goals in 1948–49. However, David Jack's "Boro" failed to break into the top ten. His retirement came at the end of the 1949–50 season, when he joined the back-room staff. He scored a total of 162 goals in 269 league and FA Cup appearances, leaving him fifth in the club's all-time goalscoring charts. He remained on the staff until 1966. He has a corporate lounge named after him at the Riverside Stadium.

== International career ==
Fenton gained his one and only England cap on 9 April 1938 in a 1–0 defeat to Scotland at Wembley.

== Career statistics ==
Appearances and goals by club, season and competition
Club	Season	First Division		FA Cup		Total	
Club	Season	Apps	Goals	Apps	Goals	Apps	Goals
Middlesbrough	1932–33	1	1	0	0	1	1
Middlesbrough	1933–34	3	0	0	0	3	0
Middlesbrough	1934–35	21	8	1	0	22	8
Middlesbrough	1935–36	6	0	3	0	9	0
Middlesbrough	1936–37	35	22	1	0	36	22
Middlesbrough	1937–38	36	24	3	2	39	26
Middlesbrough	1938–39	33	34	4	1	37	35
Middlesbrough	1945–46	0	0	7	7	7	7
Middlesbrough	1946–47	40	18	7	5	47	23
Middlesbrough	1947–48	40	28	2	0	42	28
Middlesbrough	1948–49	24	12	1	0	25	12
Middlesbrough	1949–50	1	0	0	0	1	0
Career total		240	147	29	15	269	162

== Honours ==
England

- British Home Championship: 1937–38
