= Peter Creamer =

English footballer and manager

Personal information
- Full name: Peter Anthony Creamer
- Date of birth: 20 September 1953 (age 73)
- Place of birth: Hartlepool, England
- Height: 5 ft 11 in (1.80 m)
- Position: Defender

Youth career
- Middlesbrough

Senior career*
Years	Team	Apps	(Gls)
1972–1975	Middlesbrough	9	(0)
1975	→ York City (loan)	4	(0)
1975	→ Dallas Tornado (loan)	12	(1)
1975–1976	Doncaster Rovers	32	(0)
1976–1978	Hartlepool United	63	(3)
1978–1979	Rochdale	20	(0)
–	Gateshead		
- * Club domestic league appearances and goals

Peter Anthony Creamer (born 20 September 1953) is an English former professional footballer who played as a defender in the Football League for Middlesbrough, York City, Doncaster Rovers, Hartlepool United and Rochdale, and in the North American Soccer League for the Dallas Tornado.
