= Tommy Paterson =

English footballer

Personal information
- Full name: Thomas Paterson
- Date of birth: 30 March 1954 (age 72)
- Place of birth: Ashington, England
- Position: Forward

Senior career*
Years	Team	Apps	(Gls)
1973–1974	Leicester City	0	(0)
1974–1976	Middlesbrough	1	(0)
1976	→ Hamilton Academical (loan)	5	(2)
1976–1978	Bournemouth	57	(10)
1978–1979	Darlington	7	(2)
1979–1982	Weymouth	86	(42)
1982–1983	Poole Town	?	(?)
1982–1983	Dorchester Town	?	(?)
1983–1986	Salisbury	98	(45)
1986–1987	Poole Town	?	(?)
- * Club domestic league appearances and goals

Thomas Paterson (born 30 March 1954 in Ashington) is an English former professional footballer who played in the Football League, as a forward.
