= Bill Forrest =

English footballer (1908–1965)

Personal information
- Full name: William Forrest
- Date of birth: 28 February 1908
- Place of birth: Tranent, Scotland
- Date of death: February 1965 (aged 56–57)
- Position: Midfielder

Senior career*
Years	Team	Apps	(Gls)
1929–1945	Middlesbrough	307	(7)

Managerial career
- 1946–1950: Darlington
- * Club domestic league appearances and goals

William Forrest (28 February 1908 – February 1965) was a Scottish football player and manager. A midfielder, he played 307 League matches for Middlesbrough between 1929 and 1945. He managed Darlington from 1946 to 1950.

== Managerial statistics ==
Team	From	To	Record				
Team	From	To	G	W	L	D	Win %
Darlington	August 1946	April 1950	169	60	71	38	35.5
