= Harry Charlton =

English footballer (born 1951)

Personal information
- Full name: Harold Charlton
- Date of birth: 22 June 1951
- Place of birth: Gateshead, England
- Height: 5 ft 7 3/4 in (1.72 m)
- Position: Midfielder

Youth career
- Redheugh B.C.
- Middlesbrough

Senior career*
Years	Team	Apps	(Gls)
1968–1976	Middlesbrough	10	(0)
1976	→ Hartlepool (loan)	3	(0)
1976–1977	Chesterfield	21	(0)
1977–1978	Frickley Athletic		
1978–1979	Buxton		
1979–1982	Darlington	72	(4)
- * Club domestic league appearances and goals

Harold Charlton (born 22 June 1951) is an English former footballer who made 106 appearances in the Football League playing for Middlesbrough, Hartlepool, Chesterfield and Darlington in the 1970s and 1980s. A midfielder, he also played non-league football for clubs including Frickley Athletic and Buxton.
