= John Hogg (cricketer) =

English cricketer

Personal information
- Full name: John Hogg
- Born: 14 February 1818; Woodborough, Nottinghamshire, England
- Died: 30 October 1885 (aged 67); Burton Joyce, Nottinghamshire, England
- Batting: Unknown
- Role: Wicket-keeper

Domestic team information
- Years: Team
- 1858–1861: Nottinghamshire

Career statistics
| Competition | First-class |
|---|---|
| Matches | 5 |
| Runs scored | 78 |
| Batting average | 13.00 |
| 100s/50s | –/– |
| Top score | 31 |
| Balls bowled | – |
| Wickets | – |
| Bowling average | – |
| 5 wickets in innings | – |
| 10 wickets in match | – |
| Best bowling | – |
| Catches/stumpings | 2/4 |
- Source: Cricinfo, 18 February 2013

John Hogg (14 February 1818 – 30 October 1885) was an English cricketer. Hogg's batting style is unknown, though it is known he played as a wicket-keeper. He was born at Woodborough, Nottinghamshire.

Hogg made his first-class debut for Nottinghamshire against a combined Yorkshire and Durham team in 1858 at Portrack Lane, Stockton-on-Tees. He made two further first-class appearances for Nottinghamshire, both against Surrey at The Oval in 1859 and 1861. He later made two first-class appearances for the North in two North v South fixtures in 1861 at Lord's and The Oval. In his five first-class matches, Hogg scored 78 runs at an average of 13.00, with a high score of 31. Behind the stumps he took two catches and made four stumpings.

He died at Burton Joyce, Nottinghamshire on 30 October 1885.
