= 1926–27 in English football =

Football in England
- Season: 1926–27

Men's football
- Football League: Newcastle United
- Football League Second Division: Middlesbrough
- FA Cup: Cardiff City

The 1926–27 season was the 52nd season of competitive football in England.

== Overview ==
This was the season in which George Camsell scored an astounding 59 goals in 37 league appearances for Middlesbrough

== Honours ==
Competition	Winner	Runner-up
First Division	Newcastle United (4)	Huddersfield Town
Second Division	Middlesbrough	Portsmouth
Third Division North	Stoke City	Rochdale
Third Division South	Bristol City	Plymouth Argyle
FA Cup	Cardiff City (1)	Arsenal
Charity Shield	Amateurs XI	Professionals XI
Home Championship	Shared by England and Scotland	

Notes = Number in parentheses is the times that club has won that honour. * indicates new record for competition

== Football League ==
=== First Division ===
Pos	Team	Pld	W	D	L	GF	GA	GAv	Pts	Relegation
1	Newcastle United (C)	42	25	6	11	96	58	1.655	56	
2	Huddersfield Town	42	17	17	8	76	60	1.267	51	
3	Sunderland	42	21	7	14	98	70	1.400	49	
4	Bolton Wanderers	42	19	10	13	84	62	1.355	48	
5	Burnley	42	19	9	14	91	80	1.138	47	
6	West Ham United	42	19	8	15	86	70	1.229	46	
7	Leicester City	42	17	12	13	85	70	1.214	46	
8	Sheffield United	42	17	10	15	74	86	0.860	44	
9	Liverpool	42	18	7	17	69	61	1.131	43	
10	Aston Villa	42	18	7	17	81	83	0.976	43	
11	Arsenal	42	17	9	16	77	86	0.895	43	
12	Derby County	42	17	7	18	86	73	1.178	41	
13	Tottenham Hotspur	42	16	9	17	76	78	0.974	41	
14	Cardiff City	42	16	9	17	55	65	0.846	41	
15	Manchester United	42	13	14	15	52	64	0.813	40	
16	The Wednesday	42	15	9	18	75	92	0.815	39	
17	Birmingham	42	17	4	21	64	73	0.877	38	
18	Blackburn Rovers	42	15	8	19	77	96	0.802	38	
19	Bury	42	12	12	18	68	77	0.883	36	
20	Everton	42	12	10	20	64	90	0.711	34	
21	Leeds United (R)	42	11	8	23	69	88	0.784	30	Relegation to the Second Division
22	West Bromwich Albion (R)	42	11	8	23	65	86	0.756	30	Relegation to the Second Division

Source: World Football
Rules for classification: 1) Points; 2) Goal average; 3) Goals scored
(C) Champions; (R) Relegated

=== Second Division ===
Pos	Team	Pld	W	D	L	GF	GA	GAv	Pts	Promotion or relegation
1	Middlesbrough (C, P)	42	27	8	7	122	60	2.033	62	Promotion to the First Division
2	Portsmouth (P)	42	23	8	11	87	49	1.776	54	Promotion to the First Division
3	Manchester City	42	22	10	10	108	61	1.770	54	
4	Chelsea	42	20	12	10	62	52	1.192	52	
5	Nottingham Forest	42	18	14	10	80	55	1.455	50	
6	Preston North End	42	20	9	13	74	72	1.028	49	
7	Hull City	42	20	7	15	63	52	1.212	47	
8	Port Vale	42	16	13	13	88	78	1.128	45	
9	Blackpool	42	18	8	16	95	80	1.188	44	
10	Oldham Athletic	42	19	6	17	74	84	0.881	44	
11	Barnsley	42	17	9	16	88	87	1.011	43	
12	Swansea Town	42	16	11	15	68	72	0.944	43	
13	Southampton	42	15	12	15	60	62	0.968	42	
14	Reading	42	16	8	18	64	72	0.889	40	
15	Wolverhampton Wanderers	42	14	7	21	73	75	0.973	35	
16	Notts County	42	15	5	22	70	96	0.729	35	
17	Grimsby Town	42	11	12	19	74	91	0.813	34	
18	Fulham	42	13	8	21	58	92	0.630	34	
19	South Shields	42	11	11	20	71	96	0.740	33	
20	Clapton Orient	42	12	7	23	60	96	0.625	31	
21	Darlington (R)	42	12	6	24	79	98	0.806	30	Relegation to the Third Division North
22	Bradford City (R)	42	7	9	26	50	88	0.568	23	Relegation to the Third Division North

(C) Champions; (P) Promoted; (R) Relegated

=== Third Division North ===
Pos	Team	Pld	W	D	L	GF	GA	GAv	Pts	Promotion
1	Stoke City (C, P)	42	27	9	6	92	40	2.300	63	Promotion to the Second Division
2	Rochdale	42	26	6	10	105	65	1.615	58	
3	Bradford (Park Avenue)	42	24	7	11	101	59	1.712	55	
4	Halifax Town	42	21	11	10	70	53	1.321	53	
5	Nelson	42	22	7	13	104	75	1.387	51	
6	Stockport County	42	22	7	13	93	69	1.348	49 (Note: Stockport County had two points deducted for fielding Joe Smith without FA permission on 26 March 1927.)	
7	Chesterfield	42	21	5	16	92	68	1.353	47	
8	Doncaster Rovers	42	18	11	13	81	65	1.246	47	
9	Tranmere Rovers	42	19	8	15	85	67	1.269	46	
10	New Brighton	42	18	10	14	79	67	1.179	46	
11	Lincoln City	42	15	12	15	90	78	1.154	42	
12	Southport	42	15	9	18	80	85	0.941	39	
13	Wrexham	42	14	10	18	65	73	0.890	38	
14	Walsall	42	14	10	18	68	81	0.840	38	Transferred to the Third Division South
15	Crewe Alexandra	42	14	9	19	71	81	0.877	37	
16	Ashington	42	12	12	18	60	90	0.667	36	
17	Hartlepools United	42	14	6	22	66	81	0.815	34	
18	Wigan Borough	42	11	10	21	66	83	0.795	32	
19	Rotherham United	42	10	12	20	70	92	0.761	32	
20	Durham City	42	12	6	24	58	105	0.552	30	
21	Accrington Stanley	42	10	7	25	62	98	0.633	27	Re-elected
22	Barrow	42	7	8	27	34	117	0.291	22	Re-elected

Source: rsssf.com
(C) Champions; (P) Promoted

=== Third Division South ===
Pos	Team	Pld	W	D	L	GF	GA	GAv	Pts	Promotion or relegation
1	Bristol City (C, P)	42	27	8	7	104	54	1.926	62	Promotion to the Second Division
2	Plymouth Argyle	42	25	10	7	95	61	1.557	60	
3	Millwall	42	23	10	9	89	51	1.745	56	
4	Brighton & Hove Albion	42	21	11	10	79	50	1.580	53	
5	Swindon Town	42	21	9	12	100	85	1.176	51	
6	Crystal Palace	42	18	9	15	84	81	1.037	45	
7	Bournemouth & Boscombe Athletic	42	18	8	16	78	66	1.182	44	
8	Luton Town	42	15	14	13	68	66	1.030	44	
9	Newport County	42	19	6	17	57	71	0.803	44	
10	Bristol Rovers	42	16	9	17	78	80	0.975	41	
11	Brentford	42	13	14	15	70	61	1.148	40	
12	Exeter City	42	15	10	17	76	73	1.041	40	
13	Charlton Athletic	42	16	8	18	60	61	0.984	40	
14	Queens Park Rangers	42	15	9	18	65	71	0.915	39	
15	Coventry City	42	15	7	20	71	86	0.826	37	
16	Norwich City	42	12	11	19	59	71	0.831	35	
17	Merthyr Town	42	13	9	20	63	80	0.788	35	
18	Northampton Town	42	15	5	22	59	87	0.678	35	
19	Southend United	42	14	6	22	64	77	0.831	34	
20	Gillingham	42	11	10	21	54	72	0.750	32	
21	Watford	42	12	8	22	57	87	0.655	32	Re-elected
22	Aberdare Athletic (R)	42	9	7	26	62	101	0.614	25	Failed re-election and demoted to the Southern League

(C) Champions; (P) Promoted; (R) Relegated

=== Top goalscorers ===
First Division

- Jimmy Trotter (The Wednesday) – 37 goals

Second Division

- George Camsell (Middlesbrough) – 59 goals

Third Division North

- Albert Whitehurst (Rochdale) – 44 goals

Third Division South

- Harry Morris (Swindon Town) – 47 goals

== FA Cup ==
The 1927 FA Cup Final was won by Cardiff City, who beat Arsenal 1–0.

== National team ==
The England national football team had a successful season, drawing first place in the 1927 British Home Championship with Scotland and then winning all three matches of a tour to France and the Low Countries, scoring twenty goals and only conceding three in return.

=== European tour ===
11 May 1927

Belgium	1–9	England
Florimond Vanhalme		Dixie Dean 3, George Brown 2, Arthur Rigby 2, Louis Page, Joe Hulme

Oscar Bossaert Stadium, Brussels

21 May 1927

Luxembourg	2–5	England
A. Hubert, L. Lefevre		Dixie Dean 3, Robert Kelly, Sid Bishop

Stade de la Frontière, Luxembourg

26 May 1927

France	0–6	England
		Dixie Dean 2, George Brown 2, Arthur Rigby, Own goal

Stade Olympique Yves-du-Manoir, Paris
