= John Hickton =

English footballer

Personal information
- Date of birth: 24 September 1944 (age 82)
- Place of birth: Chesterfield, England
- Height: 6 ft 0 in (1.83 m)
- Position: Striker

Youth career
- Sheffield Wednesday

Senior career*
Years	Team	Apps	(Gls)
1963–1966	Sheffield Wednesday	53	(21)
1966–1978	Middlesbrough	415	(159)
1976–1977	→ Hull City (loan)	6	(1)
1978	Fort Lauderdale Strikers	3	(1)
- Whitby Town
Total		477	(182)
- * Club domestic league appearances and goals

John Hickton (born 24 September 1944) is an English former professional footballer who played in the Football League as a striker for Sheffield Wednesday, Middlesbrough and Hull City, and in the North American Soccer League for Fort Lauderdale Strikers. He is noted for his prolific scoring for Middlesbrough between 1966 and 1976.

Hickton was born in Brimington, near Chesterfield in Derbyshire. He started his career at Sheffield Wednesday, and made his debut in the Football League First Division on 7 March 1964 in a 2–2 draw away to Aston Villa. He went on to score 21 goals from 56 appearances, which caught the eye of Middlesbrough manager Stan Anderson, who took Hickton to Teesside in 1966.

Hickton was a goalscoring legend at Middlesbrough where he scored 192 goals in 10 years at the club, making nearly 500 appearances. As of 2009, he ranked fourth in the club's all-time goalscorers list and third in terms of appearances, behind George Camsell, George Elliott and Brian Clough, and Tim Williamson and Gordon Jones respectively.
