= John Hogg (footballer, born 1879) =

Scottish footballer

Personal information
- Full name: John Hogg
- Date of birth: 25 August 1879
- Place of birth: West Calder, Scotland
- Date of death: 1950 (aged 78–79)
- Position: Full back

Senior career*
Years	Team	Apps	(Gls)
1898–1899	West Calder Swifts		
1899–1900	Heart of Midlothian		
1900–1906	Middlesbrough	90	(0)
1906	Luton Town		
Total		90	(0)
- * Club domestic league appearances and goals

John Hogg (25 August 1879–unknown) was a Scottish footballer who played in the Football League for Middlesbrough.
