= David Mills (footballer) =

English footballer and scout (born 1951)

Personal information
- Date of birth: 6 December 1951 (age 74)
- Place of birth: Whitby, England
- Height: 5 ft 9 in (1.75 m)
- Position: Forward

Team information
- Current team: Leicester City (head scout)

Youth career
- 1968: Middlesbrough

Senior career*
Years	Team	Apps	(Gls)
1968–1979	Middlesbrough	296	(76)
1979–1982	West Bromwich Albion	59	(6)
1981–1982	→ Newcastle United (loan)	23	(4)
1982–1983	Sheffield Wednesday	15	(3)
1983–1984	Newcastle United	16	(5)
1984–1985	Middlesbrough	32	(14)
1986–1987	Darlington	17	(2)
- Whitby Town
Total		458	(112)

International career
1967	England Schoolboys	1	(0)
1974–1976	England U23	8	(3)
- * Club domestic league appearances and goals

David Mills (born 6 December 1951) is an English former footballer most notable for his career with Middlesbrough and becoming England's first £500,000 footballer.

He is currently working as the head scout for Leicester City.

== Playing career ==
=== Middlesbrough ===
Mills was born in Whitby, and brought up in Thornaby-on-Tees and while at school represented his country with England Schoolboys. After school, he attracted interest from several clubs, including Hull City, Stoke City, Manchester United and Burnley, but decided on a move to local team Middlesbrough, after missing close to a year due to injury, and signed for the club in July 1968 His first team debut came as a substitute towards the end of the 1968–69 season and he scored at Swindown Town in 1969–70 on his full debut. He became a regular two seasons later. As part of Boro's 1973–74 Second Division championship side, he scored the goal that earned the side promotion in the 1–0 victory over Luton Town. Mills came to the attention of the England Under 23 selectors, earning eight caps and scoring three goals. His best season in terms of goals was in the 1976–77 season, in which he scored 18 times in 41 games, making him top scorer that season. He retained that title the next season.

In December 1976, Mills asked for a move and so was transfer listed at a value of £200,000, but nobody came in for him. Two years later, his form had again caught the attention of other managers, and so in 1979, Ron Atkinson paid £518,000 to take him to West Bromwich Albion, breaking the English transfer record and making Mills Britain's first half million pound footballer.

=== Other Clubs ===
Mills scored on his first full appearance for West Brom, but despite the huge sum of money invested in him he was not given many opportunities to prove himself, with injuries, loss of form and a switch to midfield limiting his goals. After scoring only six goals in 59 appearances, he was loaned out to Newcastle United.

At the end of the loan, he moved to Sheffield Wednesday for just £30,000, but he only remained there for a short time, moving back to Newcastle on a permanent transfer.

=== Back at Middlesbrough ===
In June 1984, Willie Maddren re-signed him for one season, in which he finished top scorer with 14 goals. He suffered an Achilles tendon injury and a broken arm the following season and did not play. He had a short spell after this playing for Darlington, where he ended his career as a player in 1987. After coaching Middlesbrough's juniors, Mills went on to play for Northern League side Whitby Town. He was seriously injured in a car crash on Tyneside, which claimed the life of his father. Later, he went on to work as a representative for a printing firm.

=== Scouting Roles ===
Following a stint as assistant chief scout at Newcastle United, where he worked under seven different managers, it was announced on 29 April 2008 that Mills would return to Middlesbrough to boost the recruitment team along with Gordon McQueen. Mills has since worked closely with Steve Walsh at Leicester City and Hull City, as a chief scout Mills has worked alongside Walsh to bring young emerging talent to Leicester City and Hull City with many ex-Manchester United youth players now found at both clubs.
