= Gordon Jones (footballer, born 1943) =

English footballer (1943–2025)

Personal information
- Date of birth: 6 March 1943
- Place of birth: Sedgefield, England
- Date of death: 29 December 2025 (aged 82)
- Height: 5 ft 8 in (1.73 m)
- Position: Left-back

Youth career
- Middlesbrough

Senior career*
Years	Team	Apps	(Gls)
1960–1972	Middlesbrough	462	(4)
1972–1975	Darlington	85	(5)
- * Club domestic league appearances and goals

Gordon Jones (6 March 1943 – 29 December 2025) was an English professional footballer who made 547 appearances in the Football League as a left-back for Middlesbrough and Darlington.

Jones made more post-war appearances for Middlesbrough than any other player and second only to Tim Williamson in the club's long history. He won the club's Player of the Season award in 1966 and 1971. He went on to coach at non-league club Crook Town.

He died on 29 December 2025, at the age of 82.
