= Tim Williamson =

English footballer (1884–1943)

Personal information
- Full name: Reginald Garnet Williamson
- Date of birth: 6 June 1884
- Place of birth: North Ormesby, England
- Date of death: 1 August 1943 (aged 59)
- Place of death: Redcar, England
- Height: 5 ft 9 in (1.75 m)
- Position: Goalkeeper

Youth career
- Coatham Grammar School
- Redcar Juniors
- Redcar Crusaders

Senior career*
Years	Team	Apps	(Gls)
1902–1923	Middlesbrough	563	(2)

International career
1905–1913	England	7	(0)
- * Club domestic league appearances and goals

Reginald Garnet "Tim" Williamson (6 June 1884 – 1 August 1943) was an English football player who made 602 appearances as a goalkeeper for Middlesbrough, scoring two goals, as well as 7 appearances for England.

== Playing career ==
While he was young, Williamson played centre-forward for Coatham Grammar School. He also played at amateur level for Redcar Juniors and Redcar Crusaders before he kept goal for Middlesbrough in a friendly game versus Cliftonville as a 17-year-old.

Middlesbrough were very interested in signing him as a professional, but he only agreed under the condition that they allowed him to continue his interest in becoming a qualified draughtsman. Williamson's first competitive appearance for the club was in a game versus Crook Town in the Northern Football Alliance on 1 January 1902, with his league debut coming in a home game against Bristol City on 19 April of the same year. Initially an understudy for Scottish international Rab Macfarlane, he gained a regular place in 1903–04 and never looked back.

Williamson's Middlesbrough service saw him make 602 appearances in all competitions, of which 130 were consecutive. His appearance total is still a Middlesbrough record. He was nicknamed "Tiny", due to him being barely 5 ft 10 in (1.78 m) tall. He played in the last game at Linthorpe Road and the first league game at Ayresome Park. He scored two goals, both from the penalty spot, though after he missed one against West Ham United he never took another, after feeling the risk of racing back to his own goal was both too risky and tiring.

He was Middlesbrough's first capped goalkeeper, gaining seven full England caps. His first came against Ireland in February 1905 in the first international to be played at Ayresome Park, in which he scored an own goal. His next appearance did not come for six more years, with the brilliance of Sam Hardy keeping him out of the team.

Williamson's reserved occupation meant that he was exempt from a call-up for World War I. The Football League refused to sanction his benefit later, on the grounds that those years during the war did not count towards his Middlesbrough service. He did eventually receive a game however, versus Chelsea.

His final game came on 24 March 1923, a 1–0 defeat to Cardiff City. At 38 years and 9 months old, he would be the oldest player to represent Boro until Bryan Robson broke that record 74 years later.

== Retirement ==
On retirement, he was paid a sum of £1000, as well as a silver tea and coffee service from Middlesbrough chairman Philip Bach. Williamson continued to keep goal for a works team, however. Not interested in watching football, he spent his free time playing golf and taking his sporting gun to Teesmouth.

He died on 1 August 1943 at North Ormesby Hospital following an operation, and is buried in Coatham Churchyard.
