= George Elliott (footballer, born 1889) =

English footballer

Personal information
- Full name: George Washington Elliott
- Date of birth: 7 January 1889
- Place of birth: Sunderland, England
- Date of death: 27 November 1948 (aged 59)
- Height: 5 ft 9 in (1.75 m)
- Positions: Centre forward; inside right

Senior career*
Years	Team	Apps	(Gls)
- Redcar Crusaders
- South Bank
1909–1925	Middlesbrough	344	(203)

International career
1913–1920	England	3	(0)
- * Club domestic league appearances and goals

George Washington Elliott (7 January 1889 – 27 November 1948) was a football player for Middlesbrough and England during the early 20th century.

On 3 May 1909, he signed for Middlesbrough. He played his first few games at inside right, but later converted to a centre-forward. He also won three England caps.

He was top scorer in the Division One during the 1913–14 season with 31 goals, and (as of 1989) held the club record for most goals in a single match, with 11 for the Reserves in a 14–1 win over Houghton Rovers. He was top scorer during seven out of nine of Boro's peacetime seasons from 1910–11.

He spent all of his 'Boro career in the top flight until relegation in his penultimate season made his final season was spent in the second tier. His last appearance was against Southampton in 1924–25 after which he retired, and resumed his job as a cargo superintendent at Middlesbrough docks. In total he made 344 League appearances for Middlesbrough, scoring on 203 occasions.

In 1925 he was committed for trial charged with manslaughter following the death of an 11 year old Italian boy whose body was found under his car. He was acquitted in November 1925.
