= Jim Platt =

Northern Irish footballer and manager

Personal information
- Full name: James Archibald Platt
- Date of birth: 26 January 1952 (age 74)
- Place of birth: Ballymoney, Northern Ireland
- Height: 1.83 m (6 ft 0 in)
- Position: Goalkeeper

Senior career*
Years	Team	Apps	(Gls)
1971–1983	Middlesbrough	481	(0)
1978–1979	→ Hartlepool United (loan)	13	(0)
1978–1979	→ Cardiff City (loan)	4	(0)
1983–1985	Ballymena United		
1985–1987	Coleraine		

International career
1976–1986	Northern Ireland	23	(0)

Managerial career
- 1984–1985: Ballymena United
- 1985–1991: Coleraine
- 1991–1992: Ballyclare
- 1992–1993: Assyriska
- 1995: Darlington (joint manager with David Hodgson)
- 1995–1996: Darlington
- 1997: Gateshead
- * Club domestic league appearances and goals

James Archibald Platt (born 26 January 1952) is a former footballer who played as a goalkeeper for Northern Ireland.

== Playing career ==
During his career, Platt won 23 caps for Northern Ireland, an amount largely restricted due to the presence of Pat Jennings in the side. At club level, Platt played for the majority of his career at Middlesbrough, and also played for Hartlepool United, Cardiff City and Ballymena United. He conceded a hat trick in a junior match in Northern Ireland, when Kenny McKillop scored 3 goals from outside the box against him.

Platt was also in the Irish team that won the Home Championship the last time it was played.

== Managerial and coaching career ==
As a manager, Platt's first job was to take charge of Ballymena United for a season from 1984 to 1985, after which he had a longer spell at Coleraine, managing them for six years from 1985 to 1991. In 1991, he had another short spell, this time at Ballyclare, for just one season from 1991 to 1992.

For the 1992–93 season, Platt was given the job of managing Swedish outfit Assyriska, in the Swedish First Division. He had a two-season spell managing Darlington one partly with David Hodgson then the other from 1995–96, before leaving full-time management to take a job with Gateshead.

Previously Middlesbrough's Chief Coach at their Football Community Centre. He ran a private football school for local primary school around the Middlesbrough/Stockton Area.

In May 2009, Platt was appointed as Darlington's goalkeeping coach. However, three months later, Platt left the club following manager Colin Todd's sacking.

== Family ==
Platt is the uncle of Angela Platt, a former goalkeeper with both the Ireland women's national field hockey team and the Northern Ireland women's national football team. His nephew and Angela's brother, David Platt, is also a former footballer and played as a goalkeeper for Limavady United, Finn Harps and Derry City. He later managed Coleraine and Limavady United.

In 2019 he was elected to Middlesbrough Council in Kader ward, representing the Middlesbrough Independent Councillors Association. He was re-elected in 2023.

== Honours ==
Middlesbrough Second Division Championship 1973/74

- Darlington
  - Division Three Play-off final runner-up: 1995–96
