= John Craggs (footballer) =

English footballer

Personal information
- Full name: John Edward Craggs
- Date of birth: 31 October 1948 (age 78)
- Place of birth: Flint Hill, County Durham, England
- Height: 5 ft 8 in (1.73 m)
- Position: Right back

Senior career*
| Years | Team | Apps | (Gls) |
| 1966–1971 | Newcastle United | 52 | (1) |
| 1971–1982 | Middlesbrough | 409 | (12) |
| 1982–1983 | Newcastle United | 12 | (0) |
| 1983–1985 | Darlington | 54 | (0) |
| Total | | 527 | (13) |
- * Club domestic league appearances and goals

John Craggs (born 31 October 1948) is an English former footballer who spent all of his playing career in the North East of England. He played over 400 times for Middlesbrough but also had spells at Newcastle United and Darlington.

After 52 League appearances at Newcastle United, Middlesbrough paid a then club record £60,000 fee to bring Craggs to Teesside in 1971. After a testimonial match against Newcastle United in the summer of 1982, Craggs left Middlesbrough to re-join his former club before ending his playing days at Darlington. He thereafter took up a coaching role at Hartlepool United.
