= Willie Maddren =

British footballer and manager (1951–2000)

Personal information
- Full name: William Dixon Maddren
- Date of birth: 11 January 1951
- Place of birth: Billingham, Teesside, England
- Date of death: 29 August 2000 (aged 49)
- Place of death: Stockton-on-Tees, England
- Position: Defender

Senior career*
Years	Team	Apps	(Gls)
1969–1979	Middlesbrough	293	(19)

International career
1973–1974	England U23	5	(0)

Managerial career
- 1984–1986: Middlesbrough
- * Club domestic league appearances and goals

William Dixon Maddren (11 January 1951 – 29 August 2000) was an English professional football player and manager. A one-club man, he made all his professional club appearances for Middlesbrough between 1968 and 1979, and went on to manage the club from 1984 to 1986.

== Playing career ==
=== Club career ===
Maddren made his debut on 12 April 1969 against Bury scoring a goal and suffering a broken nose. Despite starting his Boro career as a striker he was known as a central defender. In the 1970–71 season Maddren established himself in the Boro defence. In 1971, Middlesbrough manager Stan Anderson bought Mansfield Town central defender Stuart Boam to form a defensive partnership with Maddren. In 1973, after repeated failures to gain promotion to the old First Division, Anderson left Middlesbrough and was replaced by World Cup winner Jack Charlton.

In the 1973–74 season Middlesbrough ran away with the old Second Division finishing 15 points clear from second place Luton Town (Under the old points system of 2 points for a win.) They were promoted to the First Division on 23 March 1974, finishing the season conceding only 30 goals, keeping 25 clean sheets in a 42-game programme. Maddren's final appearance for Boro was on 3 September 1977 against West Bromwich Albion. He was only 26. Maddren had a persistent knee injury and he often played games when in pain. An operation was unsuccessful and he retired in 1979.

=== International career ===
Maddren played for England under-23s five times. He was called up to the senior side, but never made an appearance.

== Management career ==
When Malcolm Allison became Middlesbrough manager in 1982 Maddren returned to Ayresome Park as physiotherapist. By then the club were struggling in the old Second Division. Allison was dismissed on 24 March 1984, and was replaced by Jack Charlton as caretaker manager with Maddren as assistant. The new management team helped to avoid relegation and Maddren was promoted to post of manager at the season's end. In his first full season, 1984–85, Middlesbrough struggled and avoided relegation on the last day of the season. The following season Maddren was dismissed with 13 games remaining, replaced by his assistant Bruce Rioch. Middlesbrough were relegated at the end of the season to the Third Division and the club went into liquidation.

Following his dismissal Maddren concentrated on his sports shop business. The Willie Maddren Trophy is a charity football competition, whose proceeds go towards the Mike Findley MND Fund.

== Illness ==
In 1995, Maddren was diagnosed with a terminal muscle-wasting disease motor neurone disease (MND). He became a campaigner for MND research, raising over £200,000 including £40,000 from his autobiography Extra Time. In 1996, a benefit match was arranged at the Riverside Stadium between Middlesbrough and Internazionale.

== Death ==
He died on 29 August 2000 at a hospice in Stockton-on-Tees, aged 49.

== Sources ==
- Boro's Best (1997) A book detailing Boro's top 50 players as chosen by players and fans.
- The Essential History of Middlesbrough (2002) History and statistics
