= George Camsell =

English footballer (1902–1966)

Personal information
- Full name: George Henry Camsell
- Date of birth: 27 November 1902
- Place of birth: Framwellgate Moor, England
- Date of death: 7 March 1966 (aged 63)
- Place of death: England
- Height: 5 ft 6 in (1.68 m)
- Position: Striker

Senior career*
Years	Team	Apps	(Gls)
1920	Durham Chapel		
1921	Framwellgate Moor		
1922	Tow Law Town		
1922	Esh Winning		
1923	Durham City	0	(0)
1923	Esh Winning		
1924–1925	Durham City	21	(20)
1925–1939	Middlesbrough	418	(325)
Total		439	(345)

International career
1929–1936	England	9	(18)
- * Club domestic league appearances and goals

George Henry Camsell (27 November 1902 – 7 March 1966) was an English footballer who scored a club record 325 league goals in 419 games for Middlesbrough, and 18 goals in nine appearances for England. His 59 goals in one season (1926–27) for Middlesbrough was a Football League record at the time, and has only been bettered once within the English game by Dixie Dean of Everton in 1927–28. His nine hat-tricks that season remains a Football League record. He also holds the highest goals-to-games ratio for England of anyone who has played more than a single international.

== Club career ==
Born in Framwellgate Moor, Durham in 1902, Camsell started work as a miner aged just 12, after the death of his father put his family into poverty. As a miner, Camsell played for Framwellgate Moor in the Durham Central League. He subsequently moved to Esh Winning in the Northern League who covered his expenses as a footballer, before in 1924 signing a professional contract with Durham City in the Third Division North having been made redundant when Framwellgate Colliery closed. He caught the attention of several clubs after scoring 20 goals in 21 games in a season, eventually signing for Middlesbrough on 6 October 1925 for the sum of £500. His debut was against Nottingham Forest on 31 October 1925. He scored three goals for Middlesbrough in the 1925–26 season.

The Middlesbrough club record of 59 League goals in 37 games and 63 goals in all competitions in one season is held by Camsell. He accomplished this feat in the 1926–27 season, his first full season with Middlesbrough. After he had initially struggled for game time and almost joined Barnsley, he made his first appearance of the season on 18 September 1926 after Jimmy McClelland had suffered an injury. Having failed to score on that day, Camsell would only fail to score on two more occasions in the following 25 matches, taking in a run of 12 successive matches in which he scored at least once. He scored five on Christmas Day, 1926 against Manchester City and two more in the return fixture on 27 December. In February 1927, Camsell broke the record for league goals in a season by a player, having overtaken Jimmy Cookson's haul of 44 (for Chesterfield in 1925–26). 59 remains the second-highest number of league goals scored and the equal highest number in all competitions in one English league season, behind Dixie Dean's 60 league and 100 total a year later. The nine hat-tricks Camsell scored that season remains an English record for most in a League season.

Camsell was Middlesbrough's top scorer in each of his first ten full seasons, and he bagged at least 30 in each of the first five as well as the tenth. Between 1925 and 1939, Camsell scored 345 goals in 453 appearances for Middlesbrough, including 325 league goals, the fifth-highest league total of all-time. The 233 goals he scored in the first division ranks him the 13th all time top scorer in the top flight. He scored 24 hat-tricks in his career, 22 for Middlesbrough. He played his last League game for Middlesbrough against Leicester City at Ayresome Park on 10 April 1939, in a 3–2 victory. Camsell scored the opening goal. He continued to play for them into 1940 following the cessation of the 1939–40 Football League season during the Second World War, playing in wartime competitions.

== International career ==
Camsell also won nine caps for England, scoring 18 goals. This is the highest goals-to-games ratio of anyone who has played more than a single international. His goals included a hat-trick in a 6–0 win against Wales on 20 November 1929 in the 1930 British Home Championship and four goals in a match against Belgium on 11 May 1929. He scored in every match he played for England; his nine consecutive scoring appearances are second only to Steve Bloomer.

== Coaching career ==
During the Second World War, Camsell worked in local factories. After the war, he worked for Middlesbrough's backroom staff, firstly as a scout, where he discovered a young Brian Clough. He then became a coach and eventually the club's assistant secretary.

== Death and legacy ==
Camsell retired in 1963 and died in 1966, aged 63, shortly before that year's World Cup. A suite at Middlesbrough's Riverside Stadium is named after him and in 2015, calls began for a statue of Camsell to be placed outside the stadium, joining those of George Hardwick and Wilf Mannion. A club spokesman said that such an honour could not be ruled out, adding: "As a club we honour and respect our former heroes and George Camsell is certainly one of those." A statue of George Camsell was subsequently erected outside the stadium, which was unveiled to the public on 2 September 2022. It is in front of the West Stand entrance.

== Career statistics ==
Appearances and goals by club, season and competition
Club	Season	League			FA Cup		Total	
Club	Season	Division	Apps	Goals	Apps	Goals	Apps	Goals
Durham City	1924-25	Third Division North	21	20	0	0	21	20
Middlesbrough	1925–26	Second Division	4	3	0	0	4	3
Middlesbrough	1926–27	Second Division	37	59	3	4	40	63
Middlesbrough	1927–28	First Division	40	33	3	4	43	37
Middlesbrough	1928–29	Second Division	40	30	3	3	43	33
Middlesbrough	1929–30	First Division	34	29	4	2	38	31
Middlesbrough	1930–31	First Division	37	32	2	0	39	32
Middlesbrough	1931–32	First Division	37	20	2	0	39	20
Middlesbrough	1932–33	First Division	31	17	4	1	35	18
Middlesbrough	1933–34	First Division	36	23	2	1	38	24
Middlesbrough	1934–35	First Division	26	14	2	0	28	14
Middlesbrough	1935–36	First Division	38	28	4	4	42	32
Middlesbrough	1936–37	First Division	23	18	1	0	24	18
Middlesbrough	1937–38	First Division	24	9	3	1	27	10
Middlesbrough	1938–39	First Division	11	10	2	0	13	10
Career total			439	345	35	20	474	365

== See also ==
- List of English Football first tier top scorers
- List of footballers in England by number of league goals
