= List of top Premier League goal scorers by season =

This is a list of footballers who have scored the most goals in each season in the Premier League since its inception in 1992.

== 1992–93 ==
The top goalscorer in the Premier League's inaugural season was Teddy Sheringham, who scored one goal for Nottingham Forest before his early-season transfer followed by 21 for Tottenham Hotspur for a total of 22.

Rank	Player	Club	Goals
1	(England) Teddy Sheringham	Nottingham Forest / Tottenham Hotspur	22
2	(England) Les Ferdinand	Queens Park Rangers	20
3	(England) Dean Holdsworth	Wimbledon F.C.	19
4	(England) Micky Quinn	Coventry City	17
5	(England) Alan Shearer	Blackburn Rovers	16
5	(England) David White	Manchester City	16
7	(England) Chris Armstrong	Crystal Palace	15
7	(France) Eric Cantona	Leeds United / Manchester United	15
7	(England) Brian Deane	Sheffield United	15
7	(Wales) Mark Hughes	Manchester United	15
7	(England) Matt Le Tissier	Southampton	15
7	(England) Mark Robins	Norwich City	15
7	(England) Ian Wright	Arsenal	15

== 1993–94 ==
Rank	Player	Club	Goals
1	(England) Andy Cole	Newcastle United	34
2	(England) Alan Shearer	Blackburn Rovers	31
3	(England) Matt Le Tissier	Southampton	25
3	(England) Chris Sutton	Norwich City	25
5	(England) Ian Wright	Arsenal	23
6	(England) Peter Beardsley	Newcastle United	20
7	(England) Mark Bright	Sheffield Wednesday	19
8	(France) Eric Cantona	Manchester United	18
9	(England) Dean Holdsworth	Wimbledon	17
9	(England) Rod Wallace	Leeds United	17
10	(England) Tony Cottee	Everton	16
10	(England) Les Ferdinand	Queens Park Rangers	16

== 1994–95 ==
Rank	Player	Club	Goals
1	(England) Alan Shearer	Blackburn Rovers	34
2	(England) Robbie Fowler	Liverpool	25
3	(England) Les Ferdinand	Queens Park Rangers	24
4	(England) Stan Collymore	Nottingham Forest	22
5	(England) Andy Cole	Newcastle United / Manchester United	21
5	(Germany) Jürgen Klinsmann	Tottenham Hotspur	21
7	(England) Matt Le Tissier	Southampton	19
8	(England) Teddy Sheringham	Tottenham Hotspur	18
8	(England) Ian Wright	Arsenal	18
10	(Germany) Uwe Rösler	Manchester City	15
10	(Wales) Dean Saunders	Aston Villa	15
10	(England) Chris Sutton	Blackburn Rovers	15

== 1995–96 ==
Rank	Player	Club	Goals
1	(England) Alan Shearer	Blackburn Rovers	31
2	(England) Robbie Fowler	Liverpool	28
3	(England) Les Ferdinand	Newcastle United	25
4	(Trinidad and Tobago) Dwight Yorke	Aston Villa	17
5	(Russia) Andrei Kanchelskis	Everton	16
5	(England) Teddy Sheringham	Tottenham Hotspur	16
7	(England) Chris Armstrong	Tottenham Hotspur	15
7	(England) Ian Wright	Arsenal	15
9	(France) Eric Cantona	Manchester United	14
9	(England) Stan Collymore	Liverpool	14
9	(England) Dion Dublin	Coventry City	14

== 1996–97 ==
Rank	Player	Club	Goals
1	(England) Alan Shearer	Newcastle United	25
2	(England) Ian Wright	Arsenal	23
3	(England) Robbie Fowler	Liverpool	18
3	(Norway) Ole Gunnar Solskjær	Manchester United	18
5	(Trinidad and Tobago) Dwight Yorke	Aston Villa	17
6	(England) Les Ferdinand	Newcastle United	16
6	(Italy) Fabrizio Ravanelli	Middlesbrough	16
8	(England) Dion Dublin	Coventry City	13
8	(England) Matt Le Tissier	Southampton	13
10	(Netherlands) Dennis Bergkamp	Arsenal	12
10	(England) Steve Claridge	Leicester City	12
10	(England) Stan Collymore	Liverpool	12
10	(Brazil) Juninho	Middlesbrough	12

== 1997–98 ==
Rank	Player	Club	Goals
1	(England) Dion Dublin	Coventry City	18
1	(England) Michael Owen	Liverpool	18
1	(England) Chris Sutton	Blackburn Rovers	18
4	(Netherlands) Dennis Bergkamp	Arsenal	16
4	(Scotland) Kevin Gallacher	Blackburn Rovers	16
4	(Netherlands) Jimmy Floyd Hasselbaink	Leeds United	16
7	(England) Andy Cole	Manchester United	15
7	(Wales) John Hartson	West Ham United	15
9	(England) Darren Huckerby	Coventry City	14
10	(Costa Rica) Paulo Wanchope	Derby County	13

== 1998–99 ==
Rank	Player	Club	Goals
1	(Netherlands) Jimmy Floyd Hasselbaink	Leeds United	18
1	(England) Michael Owen	Liverpool	18
1	(Trinidad and Tobago) Dwight Yorke	Manchester United	18
4	(France) Nicolas Anelka	Arsenal	17
4	(England) Andy Cole	Manchester United	17
6	(Colombia) Hamilton Ricard	Middlesbrough	15
7	(England) Dion Dublin	Aston Villa	14
7	(England) Robbie Fowler	Liverpool	14
7	(England) Julian Joachim	Aston Villa	14
7	(England) Alan Shearer	Newcastle United	14

== 1999–2000 ==
Rank	Player	Club	Goals
1	(England) Kevin Phillips	Sunderland	30
2	(England) Alan Shearer	Newcastle United	23
3	(Trinidad and Tobago) Dwight Yorke	Manchester United	20
4	(England) Michael Bridges	Leeds United	19
4	(England) Andy Cole	Manchester United	19
6	(France) Thierry Henry	Arsenal	17
7	(Italy) Paolo Di Canio	West Ham United	16
8	(England) Chris Armstrong	Tottenham Hotspur	14
8	(Norway) Steffen Iversen	Tottenham Hotspur	14
8	(Republic of Ireland) Niall Quinn	Sunderland	14

== 2000–01 ==
Rank	Player	Club	Goals
1	(Netherlands) Jimmy Floyd Hasselbaink	Chelsea	23
2	(England) Marcus Stewart	Ipswich Town	19
3	(France) Thierry Henry	Arsenal	17
3	(Australia) Mark Viduka	Leeds United	17
5	(England) Michael Owen	Liverpool	16
6	(England) Teddy Sheringham	Manchester United	15
7	(England) Emile Heskey	Liverpool	14
7	(England) Kevin Phillips	Sunderland	14
9	(Croatia) Alen Bokšić	Middlesbrough	12
10	(England) James Beattie	Southampton	11
10	(Finland) Jonatan Johansson	Charlton Athletic	11
10	(Mali) Frédéric Kanouté	West Ham United	11
10	(Uruguay) Gustavo Poyet	Chelsea	11
10	(England) Alan Smith	Leeds United	11

== 2001–02 ==
Rank	Player	Club	Goals
1	(France) Thierry Henry	Arsenal	24
2	(Netherlands) Jimmy Floyd Hasselbaink	Chelsea	23
2	(Netherlands) Ruud van Nistelrooy	Manchester United	23
2	(England) Alan Shearer	Newcastle United	23
5	(England) Michael Owen	Liverpool	19
6	(Norway) Ole Gunnar Solskjær	Manchester United	17
7	(England) Robbie Fowler	Liverpool / Leeds United	15
8	(Iceland) Eiður Guðjohnsen	Chelsea	14
8	(Latvia) Marians Pahars	Southampton	14
10	(England) Andy Cole	Manchester United / Blackburn Rovers	13

== 2002–03 ==
Rank	Player	Club	Goals
1	(Netherlands) Ruud van Nistelrooy	Manchester United	25
2	(France) Thierry Henry	Arsenal	24
3	(England) James Beattie	Southampton	23
4	(Australia) Mark Viduka	Leeds United	20
5	(England) Michael Owen	Liverpool	19
6	(England) Alan Shearer	Newcastle United	17
7	(France) Nicolas Anelka	Manchester City	15
8	(Australia) Harry Kewell	Leeds United	14
8	(France) Robert Pires	Arsenal	14
8	(England) Paul Scholes	Manchester United	14
8	(Italy) Gianfranco Zola	Chelsea	14

== 2003–04 ==
Rank	Player	Club	Goals
1	(France) Thierry Henry	Arsenal	30
2	(England) Alan Shearer	Newcastle United	22
3	(France) Louis Saha	Manchester United / Fulham	20
3	(Netherlands) Ruud van Nistelrooy	Manchester United	20
5	(Finland) Mikael Forssell	Birmingham City	17
6	(France) Nicolas Anelka	Manchester City	16
6	(Colombia) Juan Pablo Ángel	Aston Villa	16
6	(England) Michael Owen	Liverpool	16
6	(Nigeria) Yakubu	Portsmouth	16
10	(England) James Beattie	Southampton	14

== 2004–05 ==
Rank	Player	Team	Goals
1	(France) Thierry Henry	Arsenal	25
2	(England) Andy Johnson	Crystal Palace	21
3	(France) Robert Pires	Arsenal	14
4	(England) Jermain Defoe	Tottenham Hotspur	13
4	(Netherlands) Jimmy Floyd Hasselbaink	Middlesbrough	13
4	(England) Frank Lampard	Chelsea	13
4	(Nigeria) Yakubu	Portsmouth	13
8	(England) Andy Cole	Fulham	12
8	(England) Peter Crouch	Southampton	12
8	(Iceland) Eiður Guðjohnsen	Chelsea	12

== 2005–06 ==
Rank	Player	Club	Goals
1	(France) Thierry Henry	Arsenal	27
2	(Netherlands) Ruud van Nistelrooy	Manchester United	21
3	(England) Darren Bent	Charlton Athletic	18
4	(Republic of Ireland) Robbie Keane	Tottenham Hotspur	16
4	(England) Frank Lampard	Chelsea	16
4	(England) Wayne Rooney	Manchester United	16
7	(England) Marlon Harewood	West Ham United	14
8	(Wales) Craig Bellamy	Blackburn Rovers	13
8	(Nigeria) Yakubu	Middlesbrough	13
10	(Senegal) Henri Camara	Wigan Athletic	12
10	(Ivory Coast) Didier Drogba	Chelsea	12

== 2006–07 ==
Rank	Player	Club	Goals
1	(Ivory Coast) Didier Drogba	Chelsea	20
2	(South Africa) Benni McCarthy	Blackburn Rovers	18
3	(Portugal) Cristiano Ronaldo	Manchester United	17
4	(England) Wayne Rooney	Manchester United	14
4	(Australia) Mark Viduka	Middlesbrough	14
6	(England) Darren Bent	Charlton Athletic	13
6	(Republic of Ireland) Kevin Doyle	Reading	13
8	(Bulgaria) Dimitar Berbatov	Tottenham Hotspur	12
8	(Netherlands) Dirk Kuyt	Liverpool	12
8	(Nigeria) Yakubu	Middlesbrough	12

== 2007–08 ==
Rank	Player	Club	Goals
1	(Portugal) Cristiano Ronaldo	Manchester United	31
2	(Togo) Emmanuel Adebayor	Arsenal	24
2	(Spain) Fernando Torres	Liverpool	24
4	(Paraguay) Roque Santa Cruz	Blackburn Rovers	19
5	(Zimbabwe) Benjani	Portsmouth / Manchester City	15
5	(Bulgaria) Dimitar Berbatov	Tottenham Hotspur	15
5	(Republic of Ireland) Robbie Keane	Tottenham Hotspur	15
5	(Nigeria) Yakubu	Everton	15
9	(Argentina) Carlos Tevez	Manchester United	14
10	(Norway) John Carew	Aston Villa	13

== 2008–09 ==
Rank	Player	Club	Goals
1	(France) Nicolas Anelka	Chelsea	19
2	(Portugal) Cristiano Ronaldo	Manchester United	18
3	(England) Steven Gerrard	Liverpool	16
4	(Brazil) Robinho	Manchester City	14
4	(Spain) Fernando Torres	Liverpool	14
6	(England) Gabriel Agbonlahor	Aston Villa	12
6	(England) Darren Bent	Tottenham Hotspur	12
6	(England) Kevin Davies	Bolton Wanderers	12
6	(Netherlands) Dirk Kuyt	Liverpool	12
6	(England) Frank Lampard	Chelsea	12
6	(England) Wayne Rooney	Manchester United	12

== 2009–10 ==
Rank	Player	Club	Goals
1	(Ivory Coast) Didier Drogba	Chelsea	29
2	(England) Wayne Rooney	Manchester United	26
3	(England) Darren Bent	Sunderland	24
4	(Argentina) Carlos Tevez	Manchester City	23
5	(England) Frank Lampard	Chelsea	22
6	(England) Jermain Defoe	Tottenham Hotspur	18
6	(Spain) Fernando Torres	Liverpool	18
8	(Spain) Cesc Fàbregas	Arsenal	15
9	(Togo) Emmanuel Adebayor	Manchester City	14
10	(England) Gabriel Agbonlahor	Aston Villa	13
10	(France) Louis Saha	Everton	13

== 2010–11 ==
Rank	Player	Club	Goals
1	(Bulgaria) Dimitar Berbatov	Manchester United	20
1	(Argentina) Carlos Tevez	Manchester City	20
3	(Netherlands) Robin van Persie	Arsenal	18
4	(England) Darren Bent	Sunderland / Aston Villa	17
5	(Nigeria) Peter Odemwingie	West Bromwich Albion	15
6	(England) DJ Campbell	Blackpool	13
6	(England) Andy Carroll	Newcastle United / Liverpool	13
6	(Mexico) Javier Hernández	Manchester United	13
6	(Netherlands) Dirk Kuyt	Liverpool	13
6	(France) Florent Malouda	Chelsea	13
6	(Netherlands) Rafael van der Vaart	Tottenham Hotspur	13

== 2011–12 ==
Rank	Player	Club	Goals
1	(Netherlands) Robin van Persie	Arsenal	30
2	(England) Wayne Rooney	Manchester United	27
3	(Argentina) Sergio Agüero	Manchester City	23
4	(United States) Clint Dempsey	Fulham	17
4	(Togo) Emmanuel Adebayor	Tottenham Hotspur	17
4	(Nigeria) Yakubu	Blackburn	17
7	(Senegal) Demba Ba	Newcastle United	16
8	(England) Grant Holt	Norwich City	15
9	(Bosnia and Herzegovina) Edin Džeko	Manchester City	14
10	(Italy) Mario Balotelli	Manchester City	13
10	(Senegal) Papiss Cissé	Newcastle United	13

== 2012–13 ==
Rank	Player	Club	Goals
1	(Netherlands) Robin van Persie	Manchester United	26
2	(Uruguay) Luis Suárez	Liverpool	23
3	(Wales) Gareth Bale	Tottenham Hotspur	21
4	(Belgium) Christian Benteke	Aston Villa	19
5	(Spain) Michu	Swansea City	18
6	(Belgium) Romelu Lukaku	West Bromwich Albion	17
7	(Senegal) Demba Ba	Chelsea / Newcastle United	15
7	(Bulgaria) Dimitar Berbatov	Fulham	15
7	(England) Rickie Lambert	Southampton	15
7	(England) Frank Lampard	Chelsea	15

== 2013–14 ==
Rank	Player	Club	Goals
1	(Uruguay) Luis Suárez	Liverpool	31
2	(England) Daniel Sturridge	Liverpool	21
3	(Ivory Coast) Yaya Touré	Manchester City	20
4	(Argentina) Sergio Agüero	Manchester City	17
4	(England) Wayne Rooney	Manchester United	17
6	(Ivory Coast) Wilfried Bony	Swansea City	16
6	(Bosnia and Herzegovina) Edin Džeko	Manchester City	16
6	(France) Olivier Giroud	Arsenal	16
9	(Belgium) Romelu Lukaku	Everton	15
9	(England) Jay Rodriguez	Southampton	15

== 2014–15 ==
Rank	Player	Club	Goals
1	(Argentina) Sergio Agüero	Manchester City	26
2	(England) Harry Kane	Tottenham Hotspur	21
3	(Spain) Diego Costa	Chelsea	20
4	(England) Charlie Austin	Queens Park Rangers	18
5	(Chile) Alexis Sánchez	Arsenal	16
6	(Burundi) Saido Berahino	West Bromwich Albion	14
6	(France) Olivier Giroud	Arsenal	14
6	(Belgium) Eden Hazard	Chelsea	14
9	(Belgium) Christian Benteke	Aston Villa	13
10	(Italy) Graziano Pellè	Southampton	12
10	(England) Wayne Rooney	Manchester United	12
10	(Spain) David Silva	Manchester City	12

== 2015–16 ==
Rank	Player	Club	Goals
1	(England) Harry Kane	Tottenham Hotspur	25
2	(Argentina) Sergio Agüero	Manchester City	24
2	(England) Jamie Vardy	Leicester City	24
4	(Belgium) Romelu Lukaku	Everton	18
5	(Algeria) Riyad Mahrez	Leicester City	17
6	(France) Olivier Giroud	Arsenal	16
7	(England) Jermain Defoe	Sunderland	15
7	(Nigeria) Odion Ighalo	Watford	15
9	(England) Troy Deeney	Watford	13
9	(Chile) Alexis Sánchez	Arsenal	13

== 2016–17 ==
Rank	Player	Club	Goals
1	(England) Harry Kane	Tottenham Hotspur	29
2	(Belgium) Romelu Lukaku	Everton	25
3	(Chile) Alexis Sánchez	Arsenal	24
4	(Spain) Diego Costa	Chelsea	20
4	(Argentina) Sergio Agüero	Manchester City	20
6	(England) Dele Alli	Tottenham Hotspur	18
7	(Sweden) Zlatan Ibrahimović	Manchester United	17
8	(Norway) Joshua King	Bournemouth	16
8	(Belgium) Eden Hazard	Chelsea	16
10	(Spain) Fernando Llorente	Swansea City	15
10	(England) Jermain Defoe	Sunderland	15
10	(Belgium) Christian Benteke	Crystal Palace	15

== 2017–18 ==
Rank	Player	Club	Goals
1	(Egypt) Mohamed Salah	Liverpool	32
2	(England) Harry Kane	Tottenham Hotspur	30
3	(Argentina) Sergio Agüero	Manchester City	21
4	(England) Jamie Vardy	Leicester City	20
5	(England) Raheem Sterling	Manchester City	18
6	(Belgium) Romelu Lukaku	Manchester United	16
7	(Brazil) Roberto Firmino	Liverpool	15
8	(France) Alexandre Lacazette	Arsenal	14
9	(Brazil) Gabriel Jesus	Manchester City	13
10	(Belgium) Eden Hazard	Chelsea	12
10	(Algeria) Riyad Mahrez	Leicester City	12
10	(England) Glenn Murray	Brighton & Hove Albion	12
10	(South Korea) Son Heung-min	Tottenham Hotspur	12

== 2018–19 ==
Rank	Player	Club	Goals
1	(Egypt) Mohamed Salah	Liverpool	22
1	(Senegal) Sadio Mané	Liverpool	22
1	(Gabon) Pierre-Emerick Aubameyang	Arsenal	22
4	(Argentina) Sergio Agüero	Manchester City	21
5	(England) Jamie Vardy	Leicester City	18
6	(England) Harry Kane	Tottenham Hotspur	17
6	(England) Raheem Sterling	Manchester City	17
8	(Belgium) Eden Hazard	Chelsea	16
9	(England) Callum Wilson	Bournemouth	14
10	(France) Alexandre Lacazette	Arsenal	13
10	(France) Paul Pogba	Manchester United	13
10	(Brazil) Richarlison	Everton	13
10	(Iceland) Gylfi Sigurðsson	Everton	13
10	(England) Glenn Murray	Brighton & Hove Albion	13
10	(Mexico) Raúl Jiménez	Wolverhampton Wanderers	13

== 2019–20 ==
Rank	Player	Club	Goals
1	(England) Jamie Vardy	Leicester City	23
2	(Gabon) Pierre-Emerick Aubameyang	Arsenal	22
2	(England) Danny Ings	Southampton	22
4	(England) Raheem Sterling	Manchester City	20
5	(Egypt) Mohamed Salah	Liverpool	19
6	(England) Harry Kane	Tottenham Hotspur	18
6	(Senegal) Sadio Mané	Liverpool	18
8	(Mexico) Raúl Jiménez	Wolverhampton Wanderers	17
8	(France) Anthony Martial	Manchester United	17
8	(England) Marcus Rashford	Manchester United	17

== 2020–21 ==
Rank	Player	Club	Goals
1	(England) Harry Kane	Tottenham Hotspur	23
2	(Egypt) Mohamed Salah	Liverpool	22
3	(Portugal) Bruno Fernandes	Manchester United	18
4	(England) Patrick Bamford	Leeds United	17
4	(South Korea) Son Heung-min	Tottenham Hotspur	17
6	(England) Dominic Calvert-Lewin	Everton	16
7	(England) Jamie Vardy	Leicester City	15
8	(England) Ollie Watkins	Aston Villa	14
9	(Germany) İlkay Gündoğan	Manchester City	13
9	(France) Alexandre Lacazette	Arsenal	13

== 2021–22 ==
Rank	Player	Club	Goals
1	(Egypt) Mohamed Salah	Liverpool	23
1	(South Korea) Son Heung-min	Tottenham Hotspur	23
3	(Portugal) Cristiano Ronaldo	Manchester United	18
4	(England) Harry Kane	Tottenham Hotspur	17
5	(Senegal) Sadio Mané	Liverpool	16
6	(Belgium) Kevin De Bruyne	Manchester City	15
6	(Portugal) Diogo Jota	Liverpool	15
6	(England) Jamie Vardy	Leicester City	15
9	(Ivory Coast) Wilfried Zaha	Crystal Palace	14
10	(England) Raheem Sterling	Manchester City	13

== 2022–23 ==
Rank	Player	Club	Goals
1	(Norway) Erling Haaland	Manchester City	36
2	(England) Harry Kane	Tottenham Hotspur	30
3	(England) Ivan Toney	Brentford	20
4	(Egypt) Mohamed Salah	Liverpool	19
5	(England) Callum Wilson	Newcastle United	18
6	(England) Marcus Rashford	Manchester United	17
7	(Brazil) Gabriel Martinelli	Arsenal	15
7	(Norway) Martin Ødegaard	Arsenal	15
7	(England) Ollie Watkins	Aston Villa	15
10	(Serbia) Aleksandar Mitrović	Fulham	14
10	(England) Bukayo Saka	Arsenal	14

== 2023–24 ==
Rank	Player	Club	Goals
1	(Norway) Erling Haaland	Manchester City	27
2	(England) Cole Palmer	Chelsea	22
3	(Sweden) Alexander Isak	Newcastle United	21
4	(England) Phil Foden	Manchester City	19
4	(England) Dominic Solanke	Bournemouth	19
4	(England) Ollie Watkins	Aston Villa	19
7	(Egypt) Mohamed Salah	Liverpool	18
8	(South Korea) Son Heung-min	Tottenham Hotspur	17
9	(England) Jarrod Bowen	West Ham United	16
9	(France) Jean-Philippe Mateta	Crystal Palace	16
9	(England) Bukayo Saka	Arsenal	16

== 2024–25 ==
Rank	Player	Club	Goals
1	(Egypt) Mohamed Salah	Liverpool	29
2	(Sweden) Alexander Isak	Newcastle United	23
3	(Norway) Erling Haaland	Manchester City	22
4	(Cameroon) Bryan Mbeumo	Brentford	20
4	(New Zealand) Chris Wood	Nottingham Forest	20
6	(Democratic Republic of the Congo) Yoane Wissa	Brentford	19
7	(England) Ollie Watkins	Aston Villa	16
8	(Brazil) Matheus Cunha	Wolverhampton Wanderers	15
8	(England) Cole Palmer	Chelsea	15
10	(Norway) Jørgen Strand Larsen	Wolverhampton Wanderers	14
10	(France) Jean-Philippe Mateta	Crystal Palace	14

== 2025–26 ==
Rank	Player	Club	Goals
1	(Norway) Erling Haaland	Manchester City	27
2	(Brazil) Igor Thiago	Brentford	22
3	(Ghana) Antoine Semenyo	Bournemouth / Manchester City	17
4	(England) Ollie Watkins	Aston Villa	16
5	(England) Morgan Gibbs-White	Nottingham Forest	15
5	(Brazil) João Pedro	Chelsea	15
7	(England) Dominic Calvert-Lewin	Leeds United	14
7	(Sweden) Viktor Gyökeres	Arsenal	14
9	(France) Eli Junior Kroupi	Bournemouth	13
9	(England) Danny Welbeck	Brighton & Hove Albion	13

== See also ==
- List of footballers with 100 or more Premier League goals
- Premier League Golden Boot
