= Premier League Golden Boot =

Football award

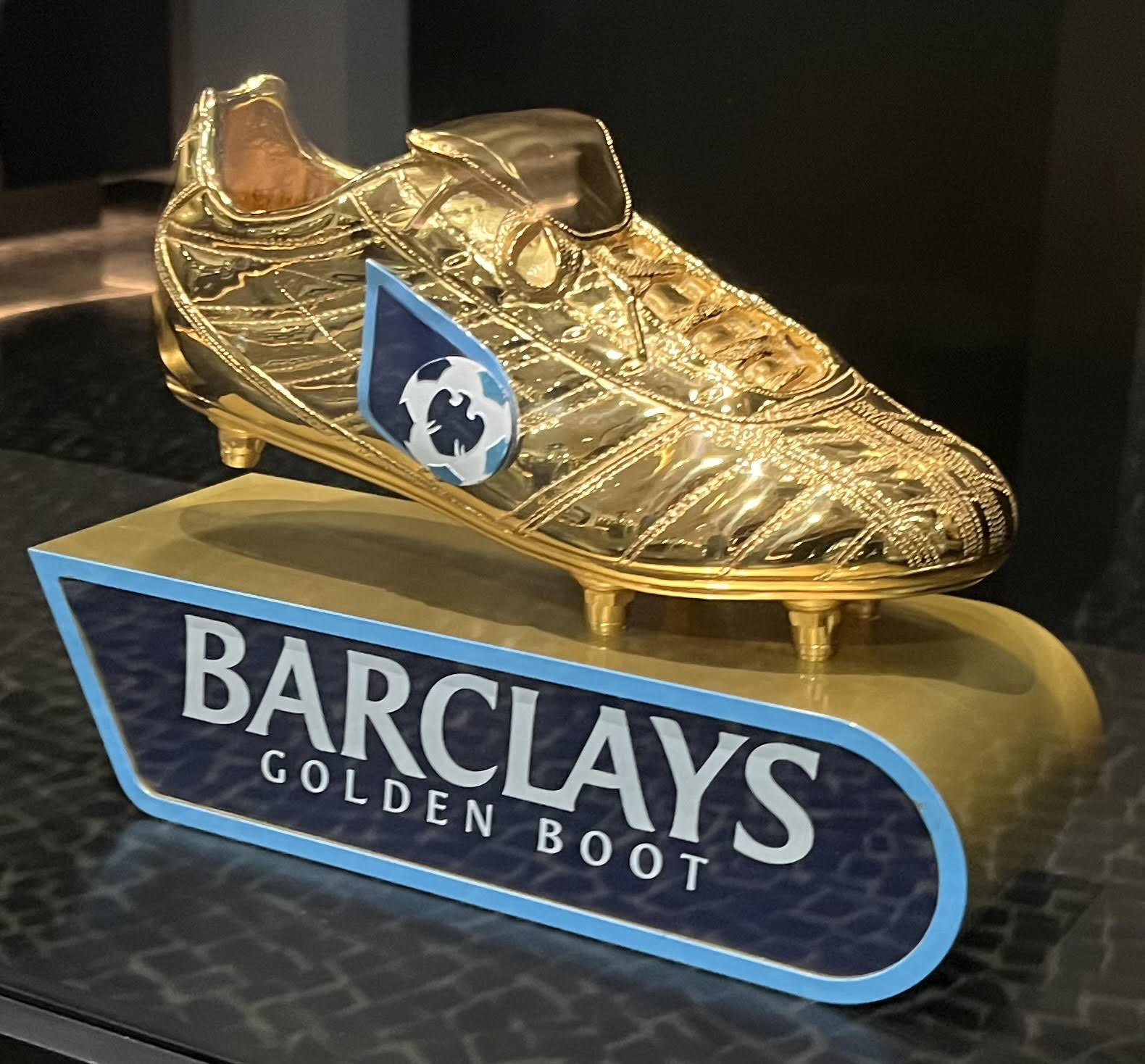
- Cristiano Ronaldo's 2007–08 Premier League Golden Boot at the Museu CR7
- Awarded for: The leading goalscorer in a given Premier League season.
- Sponsored by: Coca-Cola
- Country: England
- Presented by: Premier League
- First award: 1993
- Currently held by: Erling Haaland (3rd win)

Highlights
- Most wins: Thierry Henry; Mohamed Salah (4 awards each)
- Most consecutive wins: Alan Shearer; Thierry Henry (3 each)
- Most team wins: Liverpool (8)
- Most consecutive team wins: Arsenal (3)

The Premier League Golden Boot is an annual association football award presented to the leading goalscorer in the Premier League. For sponsorship purposes, it was called the Carling Golden Boot from 1994 to 2001, the Barclaycard Golden Boot from 2002 to 2004, the Barclays Golden Boot from 2005 to 2016, the Cadbury Golden Boot from 2017 to 2020,, the Coca-Cola Zero Sugar Golden Boot for 2021, the Castrol Golden Boot from 2022 to 2024 and the Premier League Golden Boot in 2025. Since 2026, it is referred to as the Coca-Cola Golden Boot. In addition to the trophy, winners of the Golden Boot are usually given £1,000 for every goal they scored throughout the season to donate to a charity of their choice, although Robin van Persie was given £30,000 after scoring 26 goals in the 2012–13 season.

The Premier League was founded in 1992, when the clubs of the First Division left the Football League and established a new commercially independent league that negotiated its own broadcast and sponsorship agreements. The newly formed league had no sponsor for its inaugural season until Carling agreed to a four-year £12 million deal that started the following season, and it was simply known as the Premier League in its first year. As a result, the award was called the "Premier League Golden Boot" when Teddy Sheringham received the inaugural award in 1993. Originally consisting of 22 teams, the league contracted to 20 teams after the 1994–95 season; this reduced the number of games played from 42 to 38.

Thierry Henry and Mohamed Salah have both won the Golden Boot on four occasions, more than any other player. Jimmy Floyd Hasselbaink and Dwight Yorke were the first non-English and non-European winners, respectively, when they shared the award with Michael Owen in 1999. Alan Shearer and Henry have won the award in three consecutive seasons. Kevin Phillips, Henry, Cristiano Ronaldo, Luis Suárez and Erling Haaland won the European Golden Shoe in the same season as the Premier League Golden Boot, with Henry achieving this on two occasions (2004 and 2005). Shearer, Hasselbaink and Van Persie are the only players to win the Golden Boot with two clubs.

Haaland scored the most goals to win the Golden Boot, with 36 in 2022–23. With 35 games played in the season, he also recorded the highest goals-to-games ratio to win the award, of 1.03. Nicolas Anelka scored the fewest goals to clinch the award outright, with 19 goals in 2008–09. The all-time record for lowest number of goals scored to be bestowed the award, however, is 18 goals; this was achieved during the 1997–98 and 1998–99 seasons, when the award was shared between three players both times. The latter season marked the last time the Golden Boot was shared until 2010–11, when Dimitar Berbatov and Carlos Tevez both scored 20 goals that season to tie for the award. Since then, the award was shared two more times: in 2018–19 (by three players) and in 2021–22 (two players). Notably, Son Heung-min, who shared the award with Salah in the 2021–22 season, became the first Asian player to win the Golden Boot. Erling Haaland holds the Premier League Golden Boot after scoring 27 goals in 2025–26. It was his third, putting him level with Harry Kane and Alan Shearer.

== Winners ==
Key
Player (X)	Name of the player and number of times they had won the award at that point (if more than one)
Games	The number of Premier League games played by the winner that season (Note: This does not necessarily match the total number of games in a season.)
Rate	The winner's goals-to-games ratio that season
†	Indicates multiple award winners in the same season
‡	Indicates player also won the European Golden Shoe in the same season
§	Denotes the club were Premier League champions in the same season
#	Premier League record

Premier League Golden Boot winners
Season	Player	Nationality	Club	Goals	Games (Note: From the 1995–96 season onwards, the Premier League was reduced from 22 teams to 20, thus reducing the number of games in a league season from 42 to 38.)	Rate	Ref(s)
1992–93	Teddy Sheringham	England	Tottenham Hotspur (Note: Teddy Sheringham scored his first goal of the 1992–93 season as a Nottingham Forest player, while the rest of his goals were scored for Tottenham Hotspur following his transfer in August 1992.)	22	41	0.54	
1993–94	Andy Cole	England	Newcastle United	34	40	0.85	
1994–95	Alan Shearer	England	Blackburn Rovers^{§}	34	42	0.81	
1995–96	Alan Shearer (2)	England	Blackburn Rovers	31	35	0.89	
1996–97	Alan Shearer (3)	England	Newcastle United	25	31	0.81	
1997–98^{†}	Chris Sutton	England	Blackburn Rovers	18	35	0.51	
1997–98^{†}	Dion Dublin	England	Coventry City	18	36	0.50	
1997–98^{†}	Michael Owen	England	Liverpool	18	36	0.50	
1998–99^{†}	Michael Owen (2)	England	Liverpool	18	30	0.60	
1998–99^{†}	Dwight Yorke	Trinidad and Tobago	Manchester United^{§}	18	33	0.55	
1998–99^{†}	Jimmy Floyd Hasselbaink	Netherlands	Leeds United	18	36	0.50	
1999–2000	Kevin Phillips^{‡}	England	Sunderland	30	36	0.83	
2000–01	Jimmy Floyd Hasselbaink (2)	Netherlands	Chelsea	23	35	0.66	
2001–02	Thierry Henry	France	Arsenal^{§}	24	33	0.73	
2002–03	Ruud van Nistelrooy	Netherlands	Manchester United^{§}	25	34	0.74	
2003–04	Thierry Henry^{‡} (2)	France	Arsenal^{§}	30	37	0.81	
2004–05	Thierry Henry^{‡} (3)	France	Arsenal	25	32	0.78	
2005–06	Thierry Henry (4)	France	Arsenal	27	32	0.84	
2006–07	Didier Drogba	Ivory Coast	Chelsea	20	36	0.56	
2007–08	Cristiano Ronaldo^{‡}	Portugal	Manchester United^{§}	31	34	0.91	
2008–09	Nicolas Anelka	France	Chelsea	19	36	0.53	
2009–10	Didier Drogba (2)	Ivory Coast	Chelsea^{§}	29	32	0.91	
2010–11^{†}	Carlos Tevez	Argentina	Manchester City	20	31	0.65	
2010–11^{†}	Dimitar Berbatov	Bulgaria	Manchester United^{§}	20	32	0.63	
2011–12	Robin van Persie	Netherlands	Arsenal	30	38 (Note: Arsenal's official website incorrectly lists Van Persie as having played 37 games in the 2011–12 season. He played all 38 games, as confirmed by the Premier League.)	0.79	
2012–13	Robin van Persie (2)	Netherlands	Manchester United^{§}	26	38	0.68	
2013–14	Luis Suárez^{‡}	Uruguay	Liverpool	31	33	0.94	
2014–15	Sergio Agüero	Argentina	Manchester City	26	33	0.79	
2015–16	Harry Kane	England	Tottenham Hotspur	25	38	0.66	
2016–17	Harry Kane (2)	England	Tottenham Hotspur	29	30	0.97	
2017–18	Mohamed Salah	Egypt	Liverpool	32	36	0.89	
2018–19^{†}	Pierre-Emerick Aubameyang	Gabon	Arsenal	22	36	0.61	
2018–19^{†}	Sadio Mané	Senegal	Liverpool	22	36	0.61	
2018–19^{†}	Mohamed Salah (2)	Egypt	Liverpool	22	38	0.58	
2019–20	Jamie Vardy	England	Leicester City	23	35	0.66	
2020–21	Harry Kane (3)	England	Tottenham Hotspur	23	35	0.66	
2021–22^{†}	Mohamed Salah (3)	Egypt	Liverpool	23	35	0.66	
2021–22^{†}	Son Heung-min	South Korea	Tottenham Hotspur	23	35	0.66	
2022–23	Erling Haaland^{‡}	Norway	Manchester City^{§}	36^{#}	35	1.03	
2023–24	Erling Haaland (2)	Norway	Manchester City^{§}	27	31	0.87	
2024–25	Mohamed Salah (4)	Egypt	Liverpool^{§}	29	38	0.76	
2025–26	Erling Haaland (3)	Norway	Manchester City	27	35	0.77	

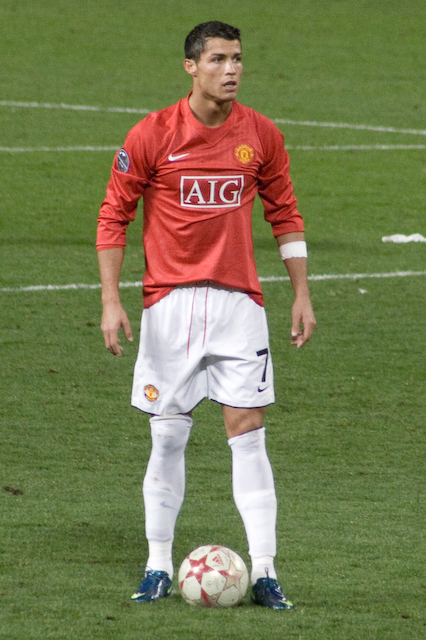
Cristiano Ronaldo, the 2008 winner, is one of five players to win the European Golden Shoe alongside the Golden Boot.

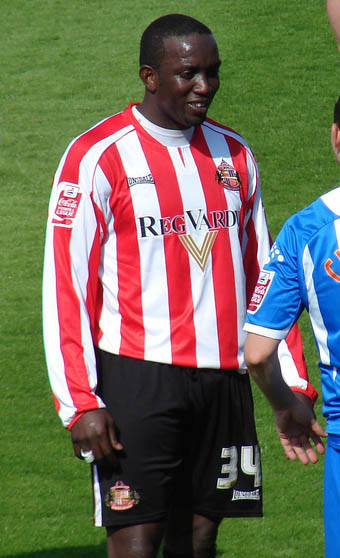
Dwight Yorke, the 1999 co-recipient, was the first Golden Boot winner from outside Europe.

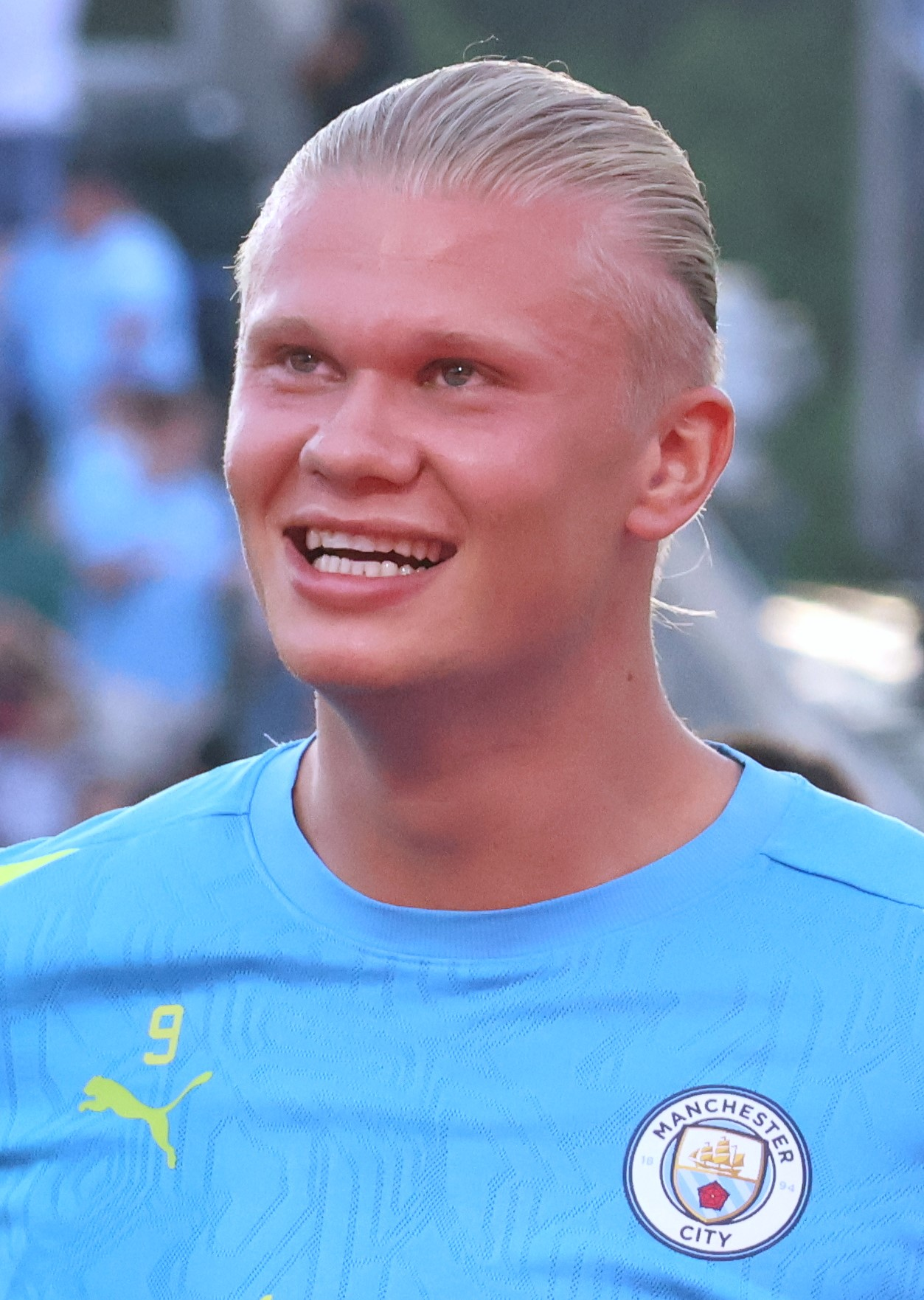
Erling Haaland, the 2023 winner, holds the record for the most goals in a Premier League season.

== Multiple awards won by player ==
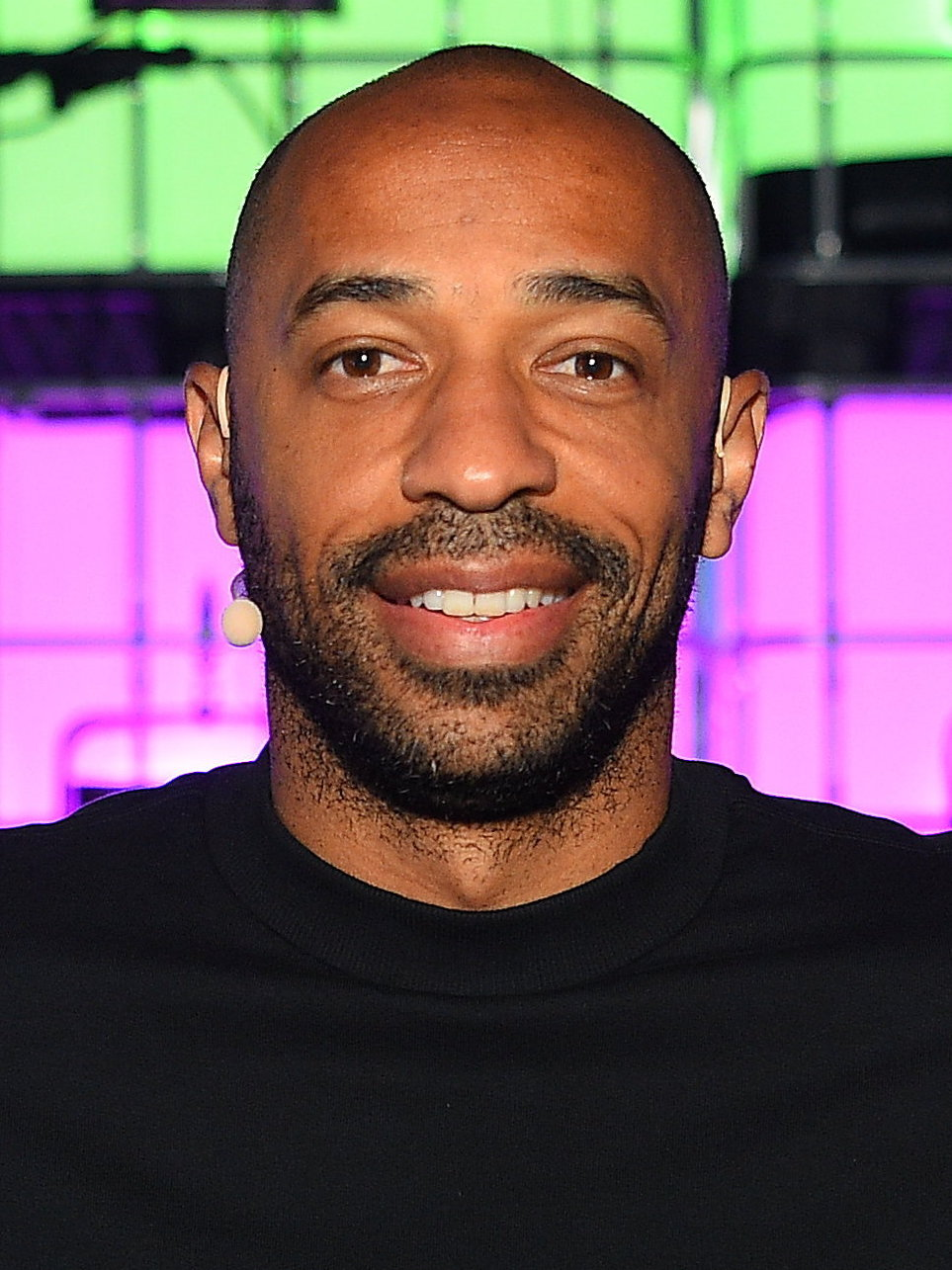
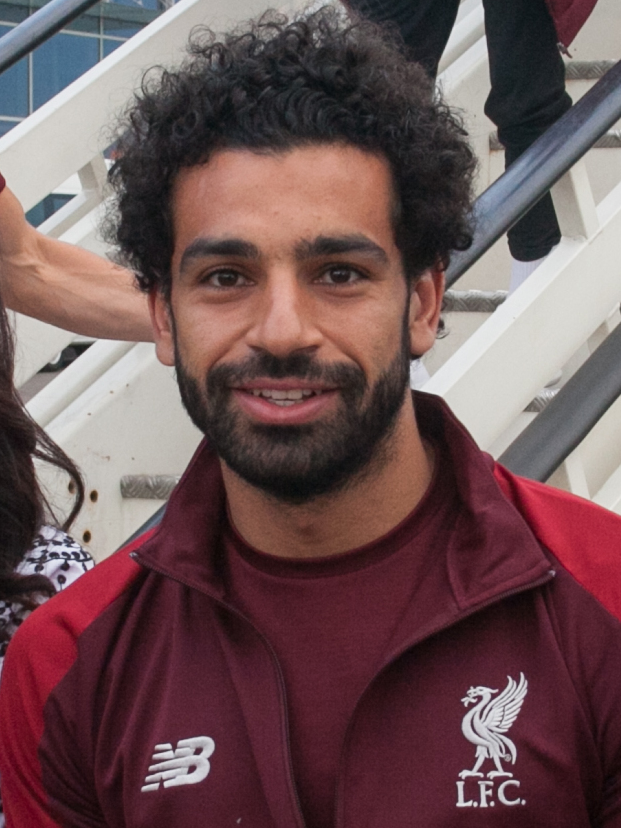
Thierry Henry (left) and Mohamed Salah (right) won the most Golden Boot awards with four each.

The following table lists the number of awards won by players who have won at least two Golden Boot awards.

Players in bold are still active in the Premier League.

Awards	Player	Country	Seasons
4	Thierry Henry	France	2001–02, 2003–04, 2004–05, 2005–06
4	Mohamed Salah	Egypt	2017–18, 2018–19, 2021–22, 2024–25
3	Alan Shearer	England	1994–95, 1995–96, 1996–97
3	Harry Kane	England	2015–16, 2016–17, 2020–21
3	**Erling Haaland**	Norway	2022–23, 2023–24, 2025–26
2	Michael Owen	England	1997–98, 1998–99
2	Jimmy Floyd Hasselbaink	Netherlands	1998–99, 2000–01
2	Didier Drogba	Ivory Coast	2006–07, 2009–10
2	Robin van Persie	Netherlands	2011–12, 2012–13

== Awards won by club ==
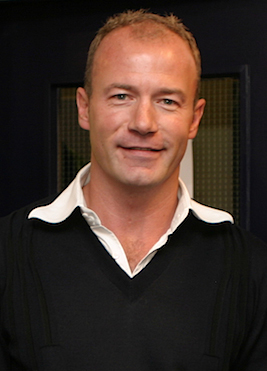
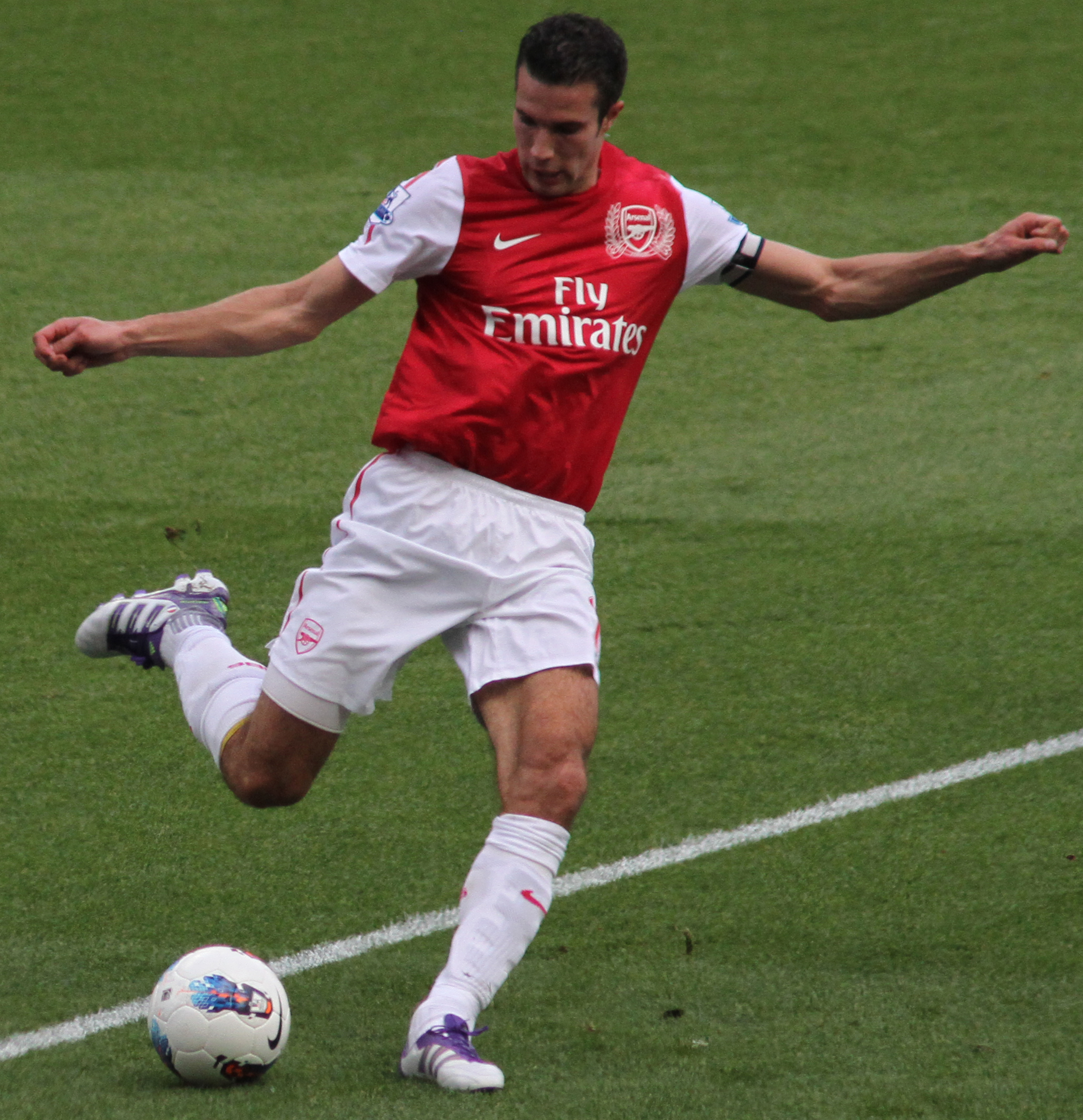
Alan Shearer (left) and Robin van Persie (right) won consecutive Golden Boot awards with two clubs.

Club	Players	Total
Liverpool	4	8
Arsenal	3	6
Manchester United	5	5
Manchester City	3	5
Tottenham Hotspur	3	5
Chelsea	3	4
Blackburn Rovers	2	3
Newcastle United	2	2
Coventry City	1	1
Leeds United	1	1
Leicester City	1	1
Sunderland	1	1

== See also ==
- List of footballers with 100 or more Premier League goals
- List of top Premier League goal scorers by season
- List of English football first tier top scorers
- Women's Super League Golden Boot
