= List of footballers with 100 or more Premier League goals =

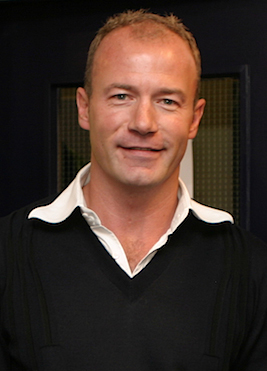
Alan Shearer was the first player to score 200 Premier League goals, and is the only player to score 100 goals for two clubs.

A total of 35 players have scored 100 or more goals in the Premier League since the league's formation. These players have been collectively referred to as the 100 Club. This list excludes goals from the Football League First Division (1888–1992), showing only those scored in the Premier League since its inception in the 1992–93 season. Alan Shearer holds the record for the most goals scored in the Premier League, with 260, and was the first player to reach 100 goals, having achieved the feat in 124 games. Along with Shearer, Harry Kane and Wayne Rooney are the only players to score 200 or more goals.

Erling Haaland became the most recent player to score 100 goals in December 2025, doing so in just 111 appearances, making him the fastest player to reach the milestone. Michael Owen is the youngest player to score 100 goals at 23 years, 133 days. Dwight Yorke was the first non-English player to reach 100 in November 2000. Mohamed Salah is the highest scoring foreign player in Premier League history. Didier Drogba became the first African to hit 100 goals in March 2012. In April 2016, Sergio Agüero became the first South American to hit the 100 mark, and Son Heung-min became the first Asian player to do so in April 2023. Six of the 35 players reached 100 without scoring a penalty: Sadio Mané, Peter Crouch, Emile Heskey, Les Ferdinand, Andy Cole, and Ryan Giggs. (Note: Giggs scored two penalties in the Premier League, both after he had already achieved 100 goals.)

Of players currently active in the Premier League, Callum Wilson and Chris Wood are the closest to joining the list with 95 and 92 goals, respectively.

== Players ==
Key

- **Bold** shows players playing in the Premier League.
- Italics show players playing professional football in other leagues.

As of 25 October 2026

List of footballers with 100 or more Premier League goals
Rank	Player	Goals	Apps	Ratio	First	Last	Club(s) (goals/apps)
1	(England) Alan Shearer (Note: Also played and scored in the top division of English football prior to the formation of the Premier League in 1992.)	260	441	0.59	1992	2006	Blackburn Rovers (112/138), Newcastle United (148/303)
2	(England) Harry Kane	213	320	0.67	2012	2023	Tottenham Hotspur (213/317), Norwich City (0/3)
3	(England) Wayne Rooney	208	491	0.42	2002	2018	Everton (25/98), Manchester United (183/393)
4	(Egypt) Mohamed Salah	193	328	0.59	2014	2026	Chelsea (2/13), Liverpool (191/315)
5	(England) Andy Cole	187	414	0.45	1993	2006	Newcastle United (43/58), Manchester United (93/195), Blackburn Rovers (27/83), Fulham (12/31), Manchester City (9/22), Portsmouth (3/18), Sunderland (0/7)
6	(Argentina) Sergio Agüero	184	275	0.67	2011	2021	Manchester City
7	(England) Frank Lampard	177	609	0.29	1996	2015	West Ham United (24/148), Chelsea (147/429), Manchester City (6/32)
8	(France) Thierry Henry	175	258	0.68	1999	2012	Arsenal
9	(England) Robbie Fowler	163	379	0.43	1993	2008	Liverpool (128/266), Leeds United (14/30), Manchester City (21/80), Blackburn Rovers (0/3)
10	(England) Jermain Defoe	162	496	0.33	2001	2018	West Ham United (18/74), Tottenham Hotspur (91/276), Portsmouth (15/31), Sunderland (34/87), Bournemouth (4/28)
11	(England) Michael Owen	150	326	0.46	1997	2013	Liverpool (118/216), Newcastle United (26/71), Manchester United (5/31), Stoke City (1/8)
12	(England) Les Ferdinand	149	351	0.42	1992	2004	Queens Park Rangers (60/110), Newcastle United (41/68), Tottenham Hotspur (33/118), West Ham United (2/14), Leicester City (12/29), Bolton Wanderers (1/12)
13	(England) Teddy Sheringham	146	418	0.35	1992	2006	Nottingham Forest (1/3), Tottenham Hotspur (97/236), Manchester United (31/104), Portsmouth (9/32), West Ham United (8/43)
14	(England) Jamie Vardy	145	342	0.42	2014	2025	Leicester City
15	(Netherlands) Robin van Persie	144	280	0.51	2004	2015	Arsenal (96/194), Manchester United (48/86)
16	(Netherlands) Jimmy Floyd Hasselbaink	127	288	0.44	1997	2007	Leeds United (34/69), Chelsea (69/136), Middlesbrough (22/58), Charlton Athletic (2/25)
16	(South Korea) Son Heung-min	127	333	0.38	2015	2025	Tottenham Hotspur
18	(Republic of Ireland) Robbie Keane	126	349	0.36	1999	2012	Coventry City (12/31), Leeds United (13/46), Tottenham Hotspur (91/238), Liverpool (5/19), West Ham United (2/9), Aston Villa (3/6)
19	(France) Nicolas Anelka	125	364	0.34	1997	2014	Arsenal (23/65), Liverpool (4/20), Manchester City (37/89), Bolton Wanderers (21/53), Chelsea (38/125), West Bromwich Albion (2/12)
20	(Trinidad and Tobago) Dwight Yorke	123	375	0.33	1992	2009	Aston Villa (60/179), Manchester United (48/96), Blackburn Rovers (12/60), Birmingham City (2/13), Sunderland (1/27)
20	(England) Raheem Sterling	123	396	0.31	2012	2025	Liverpool (18/95), Manchester City (91/225), Chelsea (14/59), Arsenal (0/17)
22	(Norway) **Erling Haaland**	121	140	0.86	2022	2026	**Manchester City**
22	(Belgium) Romelu Lukaku	121	278	0.44	2011	2022	Chelsea (8/36), West Bromwich Albion (17/35), Everton (68/141), Manchester United (28/66)
24	(England) Steven Gerrard	120	504	0.24	1998	2015	Liverpool
25	(England) Ian Wright	113	213	0.53	1992	1999	Arsenal (104/191), West Ham United (9/22)
26	(Senegal) Sadio Mané	111	263	0.42	2014	2022	Southampton (21/67), Liverpool (90/196)
26	(England) Dion Dublin	111	312	0.36	1992	2004	Manchester United (2/12), Coventry City (61/145), Aston Villa (48/155)
28	(England) Emile Heskey	110	516	0.21	1995	2012	Leicester City (33/124), Liverpool (39/150), Birmingham City (14/68), Wigan Athletic (15/82), Aston Villa (9/92)
29	(Wales) Ryan Giggs	109	632	0.17	1992	2014	Manchester United
30	(England) Peter Crouch	108	468	0.23	2002	2019	Aston Villa (6/37), Southampton (12/27), Liverpool (22/85), Portsmouth (11/38), Tottenham Hotspur (12/73), Stoke City (45/202), Burnley (0/6)
31	(England) Paul Scholes	107	499	0.21	1994	2013	Manchester United
32	(England) Darren Bent	106	276	0.38	2001	2014	Ipswich Town (1/5), Charlton Athletic (31/68), Tottenham Hotspur (18/60), Sunderland (32/58), Aston Villa (21/61), Fulham (3/24)
33	(Ivory Coast) Didier Drogba	104	254	0.41	2004	2015	Chelsea
34	(Portugal) Cristiano Ronaldo	103	236	0.44	2003	2022	Manchester United
35	(England) Matt Le Tissier	100	270	0.37	1992	2002	Southampton

== Gallery ==
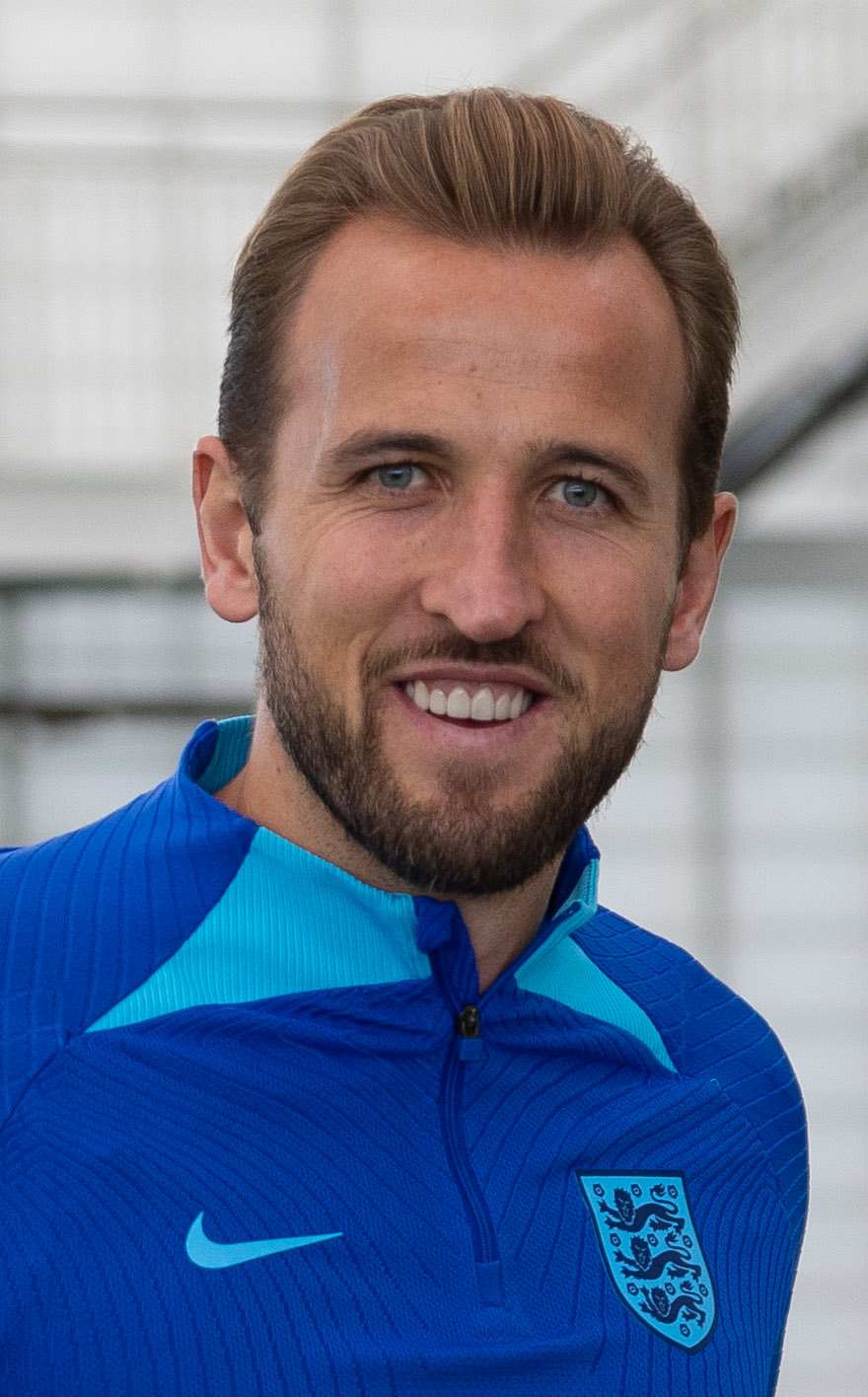
Harry Kane is the highest scoring player for a single Premier League team.

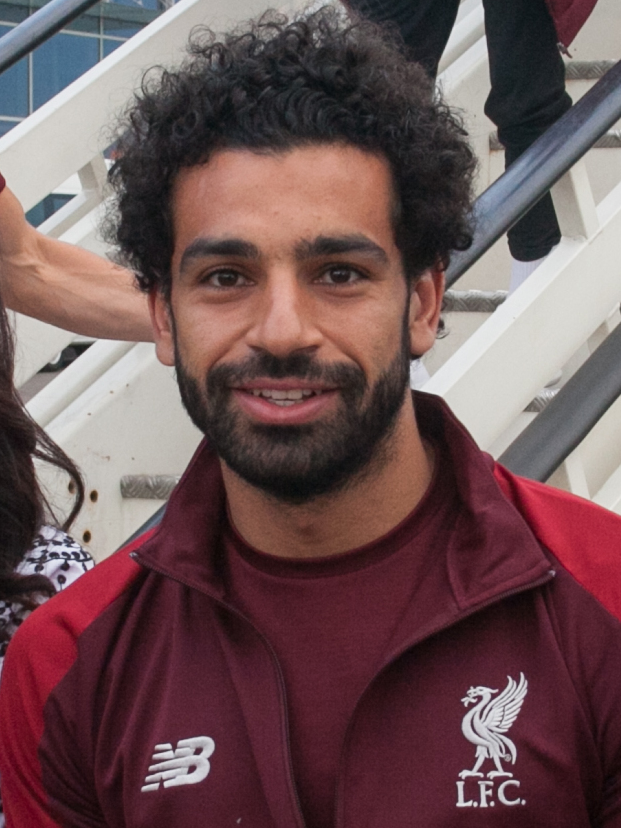
Mohamed Salah is the highest scoring foreign player.

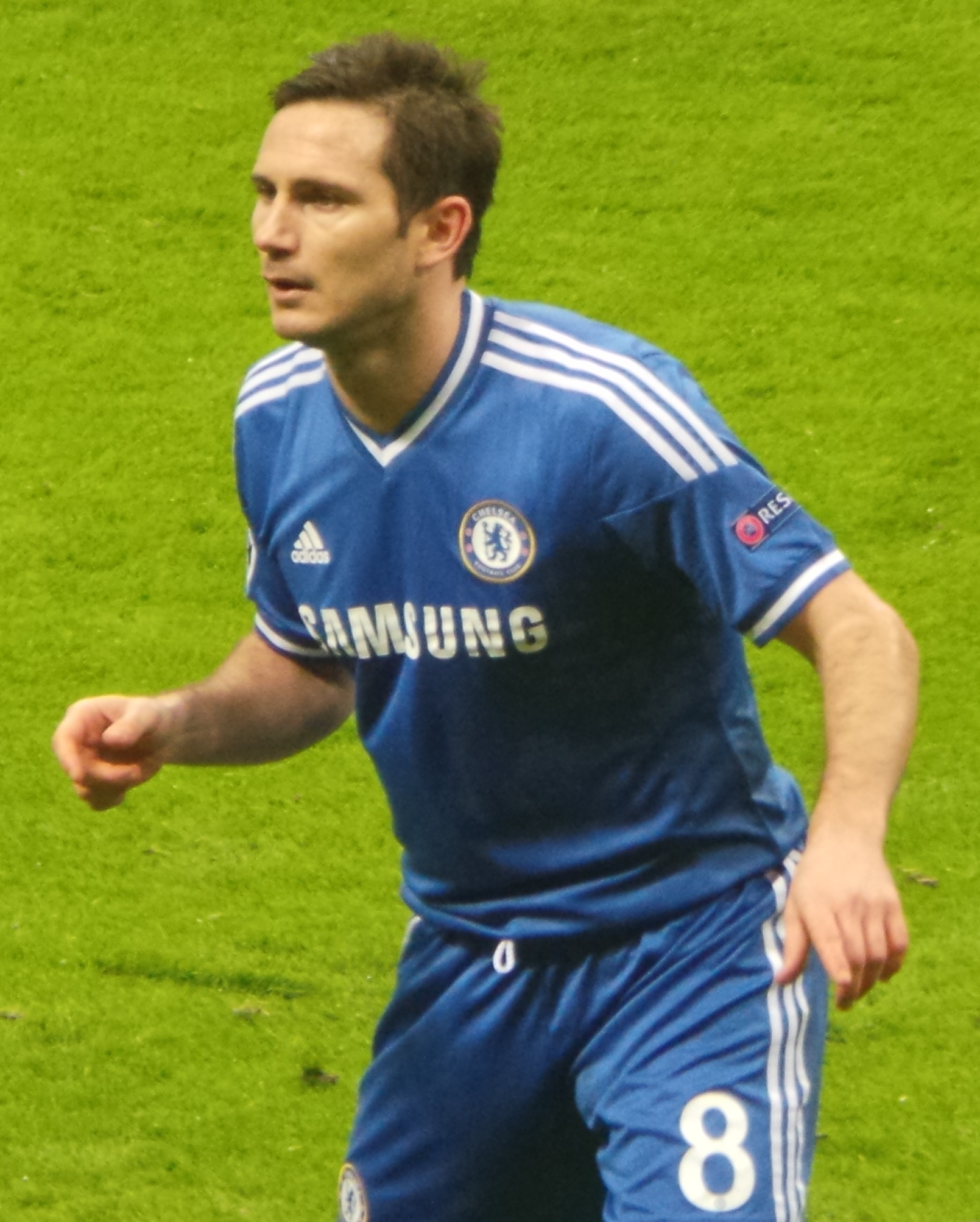
Frank Lampard is the Premier League's highest scoring midfielder.

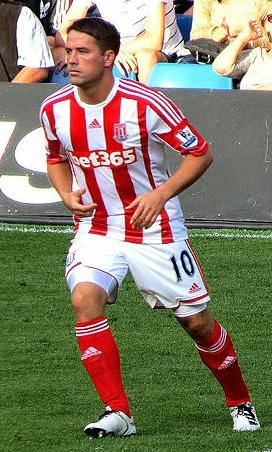
Michael Owen is the youngest player to reach the 100 goal milestone, at the age of 23 years and 133 days.

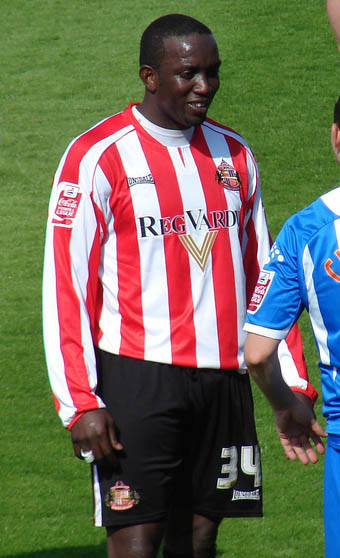
Dwight Yorke is the first non-English player to reach 100 goals.

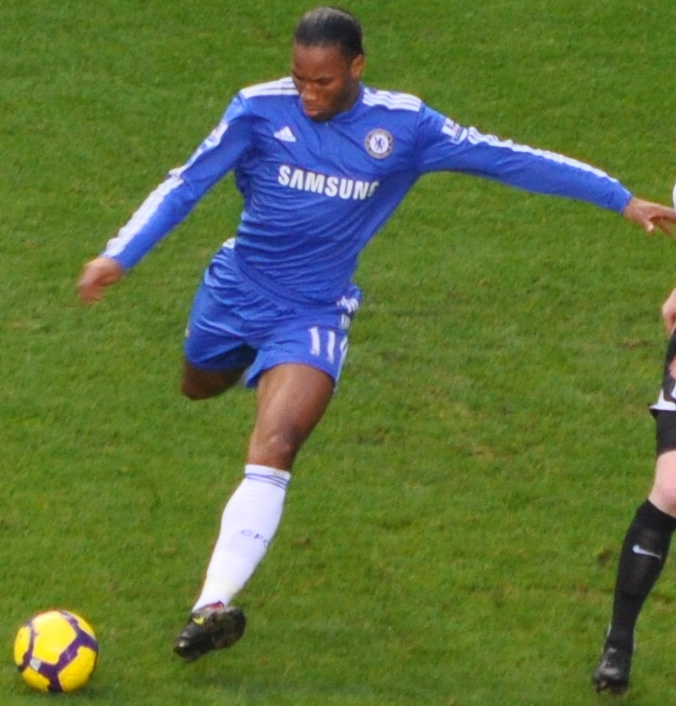
Didier Drogba is the first African player to reach 100 goals.

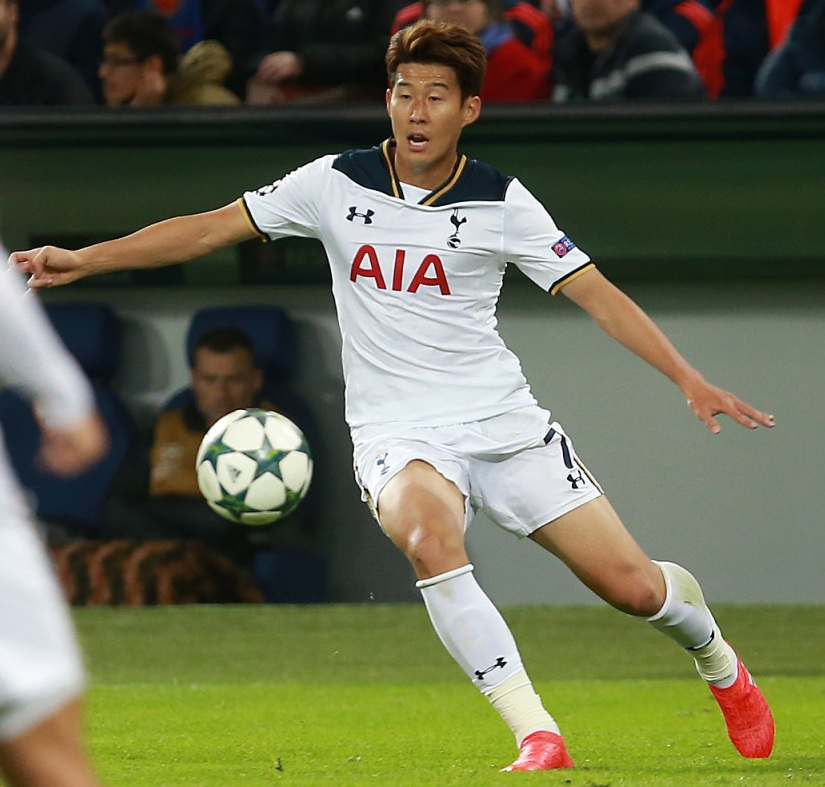
Son Heung-min is the first Asian player to reach 100 goals.

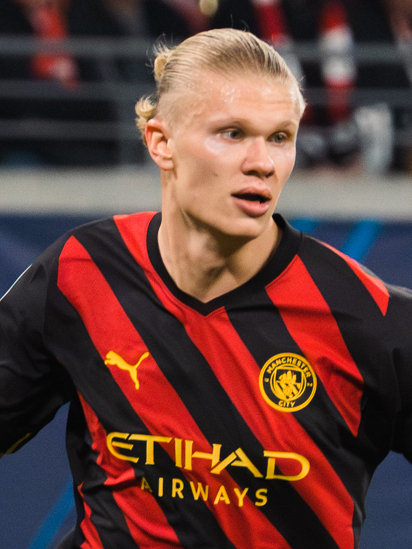
Erling Haaland is the fastest player to reach 100 goals.

== See also ==
- List of footballers with 500 or more Premier League appearances
- List of footballers in England by number of league goals
- List of top Premier League goal scorers by season
- List of English football first tier top scorers
- Premier League Golden Boot
