= List of English football first tier top scorers =

The top tier in English football today is the Premier League, replacing the Football League First Division for the 1992–93 inaugural campaign. Since the 1888–89 season, the first year of top flight football, three players have scored over 300 goals, with a further 25 players scoring over 200. In total, 256 players have scored 100 goals or more in the English top flight.

110 individual players have been named a season's top scorer. Players from Tottenham Hotspur have been top scorer more than any other club, appearing thirteen times on this list. Jimmy Greaves, the all-time leading goalscorer in English top flight history, earned the accolade four times whilst at Tottenham. Nineteen nationalities are represented, and although the vast majority of top scorers have historically been English, there were fifteen times where the top scorer in the First Division was Scottish. Since the start of the Premier League era, the player (or players) that scores the most goals in a season is awarded the Golden Boot. In the Premier League era, Thierry Henry of Arsenal and Mohamed Salah of Liverpool have both won the Golden Boot on a record four occasions. Despite being the Premier League's third-highest goalscorer, Wayne Rooney does not appear on this list at all, having never finished an individual season as the top scorer.

Once a rarity, a more widespread assortment of nationalities has achieved this success in recent years; in the 2018–19 season, the Golden Boot was shared between three players from different African countries, and in the 2021–22 season, South Korean Son Heung-min finished level with Egypt's Mohamed Salah, becoming the first Asian to be named top scorer. Sergio Agüero won the award once, scoring 26 goals in the 2014–15 season; in total, the Argentinian striker scored 184 goals between 2011 and 2021 to become the highest scoring foreign player in the top flight, a record later bettered by Salah during the 2024–25 season.

== Top scorers ==
=== By season ===
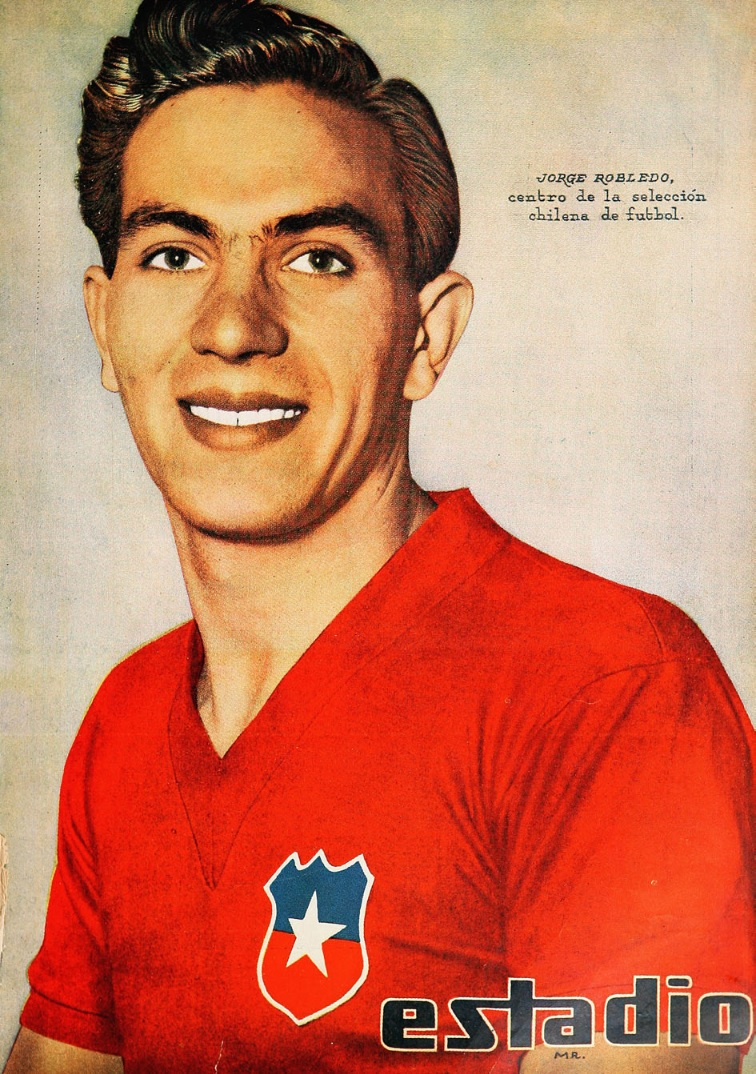
Jorge Robledo was the first foreign player to score the most goals in a season, 33 for Newcastle United in the 1951–52 season.

On six occasions Jimmy Greaves was the league top scorer: twice with Chelsea and later four with Tottenham Hotspur; however, Steve Bloomer holds the record for one team, with five won with Derby County. Thierry Henry and Mohamed Salah are the record Premier League winners with four each. Gary Lineker has won the honour three times, all with different clubs, the only player to do so.

In the 1951–52 season, Chile international Jorge 'George' Robledo became the first foreign player to score the most goals in a season, topping the list with 33 goals for Newcastle United. For two consecutive years the award was won by the lowest total of goals ever, 18. Englishmen Michael Owen, Dion Dublin and Chris Sutton won in the 1997–98 season. Owen again won in the 1998–99 season, but this time he was joined by Dutchman Jimmy Floyd Hasselbaink and Dwight Yorke, Trinidad and Tobago, the duo becoming the first foreign, league top scorers since Robledo. During this period however, two Republic of Ireland internationals, winger Andy McEvoy and striker John Aldridge, topped the scoring charts. McEvoy shared the most goals with Jimmy Greaves in the 1964–65 season while Aldridge top scored for Liverpool in the 1987–88 season. Both players, although non-British, do not appear on the top foreign goalscorers list published by the IFFHS as well as many other more reputable football websites. Didier Drogba (Ivory Coast) became the first African to win the award in 2006–07 season and later Carlos Tevez, Luis Suárez and Sergio Agüero would add to the South American winners. In 2018–19, two players from the same club both finished as top scorers for the first time: Sadio Mané (Senegal) and Mohamed Salah (Egypt) of Liverpool, finished in another three way tie, joined by Pierre-Emerick Aubameyang (Gabon). The 2021–22 season saw Son Heung-min become the first Asian winner; the South Korean international scored 23 goals, finishing level with Mohamed Salah.

From the start of the Premier League, a Golden Boot trophy is presented to the top goalscorer. The first player to win this trophy was Teddy Sheringham, then playing for Tottenham Hotspur. In the 1993–94 season Andy Cole scored 34 goals for Newcastle United, the highest number of goals in the Premier League era to win the award. The following season Alan Shearer equalled it while playing for Blackburn Rovers. Both these records however, were set during a 42-match season. Since the Premier League was reduced down to 20 teams, Mohamed Salah held the record previously with 32 in a 38-match season for Liverpool until Norwegian striker Erling Haaland scored his 33rd goal for Manchester City during the 2022–23 season. Haaland's next goal saw him break the record of most goals scored in a season by a foreign player, ending Robledo's 71-year-old record. Haaland finished the season with 36 goals, the highest goal amount since Ron Davies scored 37 for Southampton fifty-eight years ago. However all these totals are dwarfed by the all time record holder, Everton legend Dixie Dean, who still holds the record for the most goals in a season with 60, set in the 1927–28 season. Dean's 310 goals scored for Everton is still the record for most goals scored for one club, and also still holds the records for most hat-tricks, both overall and in a single season.

Since 2000, only three Englishmen have won the award. In the 1999–2000 season Kevin Phillips won with 30 goals for Sunderland. This was a record for most goals by a debut player, in a 38 match season, until Erling Haaland broke it in the 2022–23 season. Harry Kane won the Golden Boot in successive seasons when he scored 25 in 2015–16 and then 29 in the 2016–17 season. He won it again in the 2020–21 season with 23. The third is Jamie Vardy; the Leicester City striker scored 23 goals in the 2019–20 season.

Key
**Player (X)**	Name of the player and number of times they were top scorer at that point (if more than one)
^{†}	Indicates multiple top scorers in the same season
‡	Indicates player also won the European Golden Shoe in the same season (since 1967–68)
§	Denotes the club were English champions in the same season

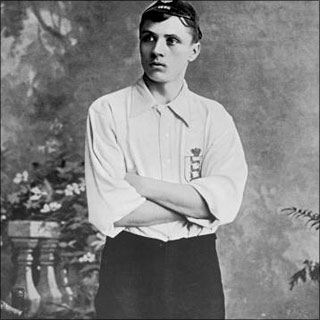
Steve Bloomer was the first player to score over 300 goals. He holds the record of most top scorer awards with one club (Derby County), with five.

Season	Player(s)	Nationality	Club(s)	Goals
1888–89	John Goodall	England	Preston North End^{§}	21
1889–90	Jimmy Ross	Scotland	Preston North End^{§}	22
1890–91	Jack Southworth	England	Blackburn Rovers	26
1891–92	John Campbell	Scotland	Sunderland^{§}	32
1892–93	John Campbell (2)	Scotland	Sunderland^{§}	31
1893–94	Jack Southworth (2)	England	Everton	27
1894–95	John Campbell (3)	Scotland	Sunderland^{§}	22
1895–96^{†}	Steve Bloomer	England	Derby County	20
1895–96^{†}	John Campbell	Scotland	Aston Villa^{§}	20
1896–97	Steve Bloomer (2)	England	Derby County	22
1897–98	Fred Wheldon	England	Aston Villa	21
1898–99	Steve Bloomer (3)	England	Derby County	23
1899–1900	Billy Garraty	England	Aston Villa^{§}	27
1900–01	Steve Bloomer (4)	England	Derby County	23
1901–02	Jimmy Settle	England	Everton	18
1902–03	Sam Raybould	England	Liverpool	31
1903–04	Steve Bloomer (5)	England	Derby County	20
1904–05	Arthur Brown	England	Sheffield United	22
1905–06	Albert Shepherd	England	Bolton Wanderers	26
1906–07	Alex Young	Scotland	Everton	28
1907–08	Enoch West	England	Nottingham Forest	27
1908–09	Bert Freeman	England	Everton	38
1909–10	Jack Parkinson	England	Liverpool	30
1910–11	Albert Shepherd (2)	England	Newcastle United	25
1911–12^{†}	Harry Hampton	England	Aston Villa	25
1911–12^{†}	George Holley	England	Sunderland	25
1911–12^{†}	David McLean	Scotland	Sheffield Wednesday	25
1912–13	David McLean (2)	Scotland	Sheffield Wednesday	30
1913–14	George Elliott	England	Middlesbrough	32
1914–15	Bobby Parker	Scotland	Everton^{§}	35
1919–20	Fred Morris	England	West Bromwich Albion^{§}	37
1920–21	Joe Smith	England	Bolton Wanderers	38
1921–22	Andrew Wilson	Scotland	Middlesbrough	31
1922–23	Charlie Buchan	England	Sunderland	30
1923–24	Wilf Chadwick	England	Everton	28
1924–25	Frank Roberts	England	Manchester City	31
1925–26	Ted Harper	England	Blackburn Rovers	43
1926–27	Jimmy Trotter	England	Sheffield Wednesday	37
1927–28	Dixie Dean	England	Everton^{§}	60
1928–29	Dave Halliday	Scotland	Sunderland	43
1929–30	Vic Watson	England	West Ham United	41
1930–31	Tom Waring	England	Aston Villa	49
1931–32	Dixie Dean (2)	England	Everton^{§}	44
1932–33	Jack Bowers	England	Derby County	35
1933–34	Jack Bowers (2)	England	Derby County	34
1934–35	Ted Drake	England	Arsenal^{§}	42
1935–36	W. G. Richardson	England	West Bromwich Albion	39
1936–37	Freddie Steele	England	Stoke City	33
1937–38	Tommy Lawton	England	Everton	34
1938–39	Tommy Lawton (2)	England	Everton^{§}	35
1946–47	Dennis Westcott	England	Wolverhampton Wanderers	37
1947–48	Ronnie Rooke	England	Arsenal^{§}	33
1948–49	Willie Moir	Scotland	Bolton Wanderers	25
1949–50	Dickie Davis	England	Sunderland	25
1950–51	Stan Mortensen	England	Blackpool	30
1951–52	George Robledo	Chile	Newcastle United	33
1952–53	Charlie Wayman	England	Preston North End	24
1953–54	Jimmy Glazzard	England	Huddersfield Town	29
1954–55	Ronnie Allen	England	West Bromwich Albion	27
1955–56	Nat Lofthouse	England	Bolton Wanderers	33
1956–57	John Charles	Wales	Leeds United	38
1957–58	Bobby Smith	England	Tottenham Hotspur	36
1958–59	Jimmy Greaves	England	Chelsea	33
1959–60	Dennis Viollet	England	Manchester United	32
1960–61	Jimmy Greaves (2)	England	Chelsea	41
1961–62^{†}	Ray Crawford	England	Ipswich Town^{§}	33
1961–62^{†}	Derek Kevan	England	West Bromwich Albion	33
1962–63	Jimmy Greaves (3)	England	Tottenham Hotspur	37
1963–64	Jimmy Greaves (4)	England	Tottenham Hotspur	35
1964–65^{†}	Jimmy Greaves (5)	England	Tottenham Hotspur	29
1964–65^{†}	Andy McEvoy	Republic of Ireland	Blackburn Rovers	29
1965–66^{†}	Roger Hunt	England	Liverpool^{§}	29
1965–66^{†}	Willie Irvine	Northern Ireland	Burnley	29
1966–67	Ron Davies	Wales	Southampton	37
1967–68^{†}	George Best	Northern Ireland	Manchester United	28
1967–68^{†}	Ron Davies (2)	Wales	Southampton	28
1968–69	Jimmy Greaves (6)	England	Tottenham Hotspur	27
1969–70	Jeff Astle	England	West Bromwich Albion	25
1970–71	Tony Brown	England	West Bromwich Albion	28
1971–72	Francis Lee	England	Manchester City	33
1972–73	Pop Robson	England	West Ham United	28
1973–74	Mick Channon	England	Southampton	21
1974–75	Malcolm Macdonald	England	Newcastle United	21
1975–76	Ted MacDougall	Scotland	Norwich City	23
1976–77^{†}	Andy Gray	Scotland	Aston Villa	25
1976–77^{†}	Malcolm Macdonald (2)	England	Arsenal	25
1977–78	Bob Latchford	England	Everton	30
1978–79	Frank Worthington	England	Bolton Wanderers	24
1979–80	Phil Boyer	England	Southampton	23
1980–81^{†}	Steve Archibald	Scotland	Tottenham Hotspur	20
1980–81^{†}	Peter Withe	England	Aston Villa^{§}	20
1981–82	Kevin Keegan	England	Southampton	26
1982–83	Luther Blissett	England	Watford	27
1983–84	Ian Rush^{‡}	Wales	Liverpool^{§}	32
1984–85^{†}	Kerry Dixon	England	Chelsea	24
1984–85^{†}	Gary Lineker	England	Leicester City	24
1985–86	Gary Lineker (2)	England	Everton	30
1986–87	Clive Allen	England	Tottenham Hotspur	33
1987–88	John Aldridge	Republic of Ireland	Liverpool^{§}	26
1988–89	Alan Smith	England	Arsenal^{§}	23
1989–90	Gary Lineker (3)	England	Tottenham Hotspur	24
1990–91	Alan Smith (2)	England	Arsenal^{§}	22
1991–92	Ian Wright	England	Crystal Palace; Arsenal	29 (Note: 5 goals in 8 appearances for Crystal Palace, 24 goals in 30 appearances for Arsenal)
1992–93	Teddy Sheringham	England	Nottingham Forest; Tottenham Hotspur	22 (Note: 1 goal in 3 appearances for Nottingham Forest, 21 goals in 38 appearances for Tottenham Hotspur)
1993–94	Andy Cole	England	Newcastle United	34
1994–95	Alan Shearer	England	Blackburn Rovers^{§}	34
1995–96	Alan Shearer (2)	England	Blackburn Rovers	31
1996–97	Alan Shearer (3)	England	Newcastle United	25
1997–98^{†}	Dion Dublin	England	Coventry City	18
1997–98^{†}	Michael Owen	England	Liverpool	18
1997–98^{†}	Chris Sutton	England	Blackburn Rovers	18
1998–99^{†}	Jimmy Floyd Hasselbaink	Netherlands	Leeds United	18
1998–99^{†}	Michael Owen (2)	England	Liverpool	18
1998–99^{†}	Dwight Yorke	Trinidad and Tobago	Manchester United^{§}	18
1999–2000	Kevin Phillips^{‡}	England	Sunderland	30
2000–01	Jimmy Floyd Hasselbaink (2)	Netherlands	Chelsea	23
2001–02	Thierry Henry	France	Arsenal^{§}	24
2002–03	Ruud van Nistelrooy	Netherlands	Manchester United^{§}	25
2003–04	Thierry Henry^{‡} (2)	France	Arsenal^{§}	30
2004–05	Thierry Henry^{‡} (3)	France	Arsenal	25
2005–06	Thierry Henry (4)	France	Arsenal	27
2006–07	Didier Drogba	Ivory Coast	Chelsea	20
2007–08	Cristiano Ronaldo^{‡}	Portugal	Manchester United^{§}	31
2008–09	Nicolas Anelka	France	Chelsea	19
2009–10	Didier Drogba (2)	Ivory Coast	Chelsea^{§}	29
2010–11^{†}	Dimitar Berbatov	Bulgaria	Manchester United^{§}	20
2010–11^{†}	Carlos Tevez	Argentina	Manchester City	20
2011–12	Robin van Persie	Netherlands	Arsenal	30
2012–13	Robin van Persie (2)	Netherlands	Manchester United^{§}	26
2013–14	Luis Suárez^{‡}	Uruguay	Liverpool	31
2014–15	Sergio Agüero	Argentina	Manchester City	26
2015–16	Harry Kane	England	Tottenham Hotspur	25
2016–17	Harry Kane (2)	England	Tottenham Hotspur	29
2017–18	Mohamed Salah	Egypt	Liverpool	32
2018–19^{†}	Pierre-Emerick Aubameyang	Gabon	Arsenal	22
2018–19^{†}	Sadio Mané	Senegal	Liverpool	22
2018–19^{†}	Mohamed Salah (2)	Egypt	Liverpool	22
2019–20	Jamie Vardy	England	Leicester City	23
2020–21	Harry Kane (3)	England	Tottenham Hotspur	23
2021–22^{†}	Mohamed Salah (3)	Egypt	Liverpool	23
2021–22^{†}	Son Heung-min	South Korea	Tottenham Hotspur	23
2022–23	Erling Haaland^{‡}	Norway	Manchester City^{§}	36
2023–24	Erling Haaland (2)	Norway	Manchester City^{§}	27
2024–25	Mohamed Salah (4)	Egypt	Liverpool^{§}	29
2025–26	Erling Haaland (3)	Norway	Manchester City	27

=== By number of seasons as top scorer ===
As of 24 May 2026

Rank	Player	Titles	Club(s)	Years	Ref.
1	(England) Jimmy Greaves	6	Chelsea 1959, 1961, Tottenham Hotspur 1963, 1964, 1965, 1969	1958–59, 1960–61, 1962–63, 1963–64, 1964–65, 1968–69	
2	(England) Steve Bloomer	5	Derby County	1895–96, 1896–97, 1898–99, 1900–01, 1903–04	
3	(France) Thierry Henry	4	Arsenal	2001–02, 2003–04, 2004–05, 2005–06	
3	(Egypt) Mohamed Salah	4	Liverpool	2017–18, 2018–19, 2021–22, 2024–25	
5	(Scotland) John Campbell	3	Sunderland	1891–92, 1892–93, 1894–95	
5	(England) Gary Lineker	3	Leicester City 1985, Everton 1986, Tottenham Hotspur 1990	1984–85, 1985–86, 1989–90	
5	(England) Alan Shearer	3	Blackburn Rovers 1995, 1996, Newcastle United 1997	1994–95, 1995–96, 1996–97	
5	(England) Harry Kane	3	Tottenham Hotspur	2015–16, 2016–17, 2020–21	
5	(Norway) **Erling Haaland**	3	Manchester City	2022–23, 2023–24, 2025–26	
10	(England) Jack Southworth	2	Blackburn Rovers 1891, Everton 1894	1890–91, 1893–94	
10	(England) Albert Shepherd	2	Bolton Wanderers 1906, Newcastle United 1911	1905–06, 1910–11	
10	(Scotland) David McLean	2	Sheffield Wednesday	1911–12, 1912–13	
10	(England) Dixie Dean	2	Everton	1927–28, 1931–32	
10	(England) Jack Bowers	2	Derby County	1932–33, 1933–34	
10	(England) Tommy Lawton	2	Everton	1937–38, 1938–39	
10	(Wales) Ron Davies	2	Southampton	1966–67, 1967–68	
10	(England) Malcolm Macdonald	2	Newcastle United 1975, Arsenal 1977	1974–75, 1976–77	
10	(England) Alan Smith	2	Arsenal	1988–89, 1990–91	
10	(England) Michael Owen	2	Liverpool	1997–98, 1998–99	
10	(Netherlands) Jimmy Floyd Hasselbaink	2	Leeds United 1999, Chelsea 2001	1998–99, 2000–01	
10	(Ivory Coast) Didier Drogba	2	Chelsea	2006–07, 2009–10	
10	(Netherlands) Robin van Persie	2	Arsenal 2012, Manchester United 2013	2011–12, 2012–13	

- **Bold** shows players currently playing in the Premier League.
- Italics show players still playing professional football.

=== By club ===
Coventry City and Stoke City are the only clubs with top league scorers whose teams have never finished in the top three.

Rank	Club	Titles	Seasons
1	Tottenham Hotspur	13	1957–58, 1962–63, 1963–64, 1964–65, 1968–69, 1980–81, 1986–87, 1989–90, 1992–93, 2015–16, 2016–17, 2020–21, 2021–22
2	Arsenal	12	1934–35, 1947–48, 1976–77, 1988–89, 1990–91, 1991–92, 2001–02, 2003–04, 2004–05, 2005–06, 2011–12, 2018–19
2	Everton	12	1893–94, 1901–02, 1906–07, 1908–09, 1914–15, 1923–24, 1927–28, 1931–32, 1937–38, 1938–39, 1977–78, 1985–86
2	Liverpool	12	1902–03, 1909–10, 1965–66, 1983–84, 1987–88, 1997–98, 1998–99, 2013–14, 2017–18, 2018–19, 2021–22, 2024–25
5	Sunderland	8	1891–92, 1892–93, 1894–95, 1911–12, 1922–23, 1928–29, 1949–50, 1999–2000
6	Derby County	7	1895–96, 1896–97, 1898–99, 1900–01, 1903–04, 1932–33, 1933–34
6	Aston Villa	7	1895–96, 1897–98, 1899–1900, 1911–12, 1930–31, 1976–77, 1980–81
6	Chelsea	7	1958–59, 1960–61, 1984–85, 2000–01, 2006–07, 2008–09, 2009–10
6	Manchester United	7	1959–60, 1967–68, 1998–99, 2002–03, 2007–08, 2010–11, 2012–13
6	Manchester City	7	1924–25, 1971–72, 2010–11, 2014–15, 2022–23, 2023–24, 2025–26
11	West Bromwich Albion	6	1919–20, 1935–36, 1954–55, 1961–62, 1969–70, 1970–71
11	Blackburn Rovers	6	1890–91, 1925–26, 1964–65, 1994–95, 1995–96, 1997–98
13	Bolton Wanderers	5	1905–06, 1920–21, 1948–49, 1955–56, 1978–79
13	Southampton	5	1966–67, 1967–68, 1973–74, 1979–80, 1981–82
13	Newcastle United	5	1910–11, 1951–52, 1974–75, 1993–94, 1996–97
16	Sheffield Wednesday	3	1911–12, 1912–13, 1926–27
16	Preston North End	3	1888–89, 1889–90, 1952–53
18	Middlesbrough	2	1913–14, 1921–22
18	West Ham United	2	1929–30, 1972–73
18	Leeds United	2	1956–57, 1998–99
18	Leicester City	2	1984–85, 2019–20
22	Sheffield United	1	1904–05
22	Nottingham Forest	1	1907–08
22	Stoke City	1	1936–37
22	Wolverhampton Wanderers	1	1946–47
22	Blackpool	1	1950–51
22	Huddersfield Town	1	1953–54
22	Ipswich Town	1	1961–62
22	Burnley	1	1965–66
22	Norwich City	1	1975–76
22	Watford	1	1982–83
22	Coventry City	1	1997–98

=== By nationality ===
Country	Titles
England	90
Scotland	15
France	5
Netherlands	5
Egypt	4
Wales	4
Norway	3
Argentina	2
Ivory Coast	2
Northern Ireland	2
Republic of Ireland	2
Bulgaria	1
Chile	1
Gabon	1
Portugal	1
Senegal	1
South Korea	1
Trinidad and Tobago	1
Uruguay	1

== Top 50 all-time top scorers ==
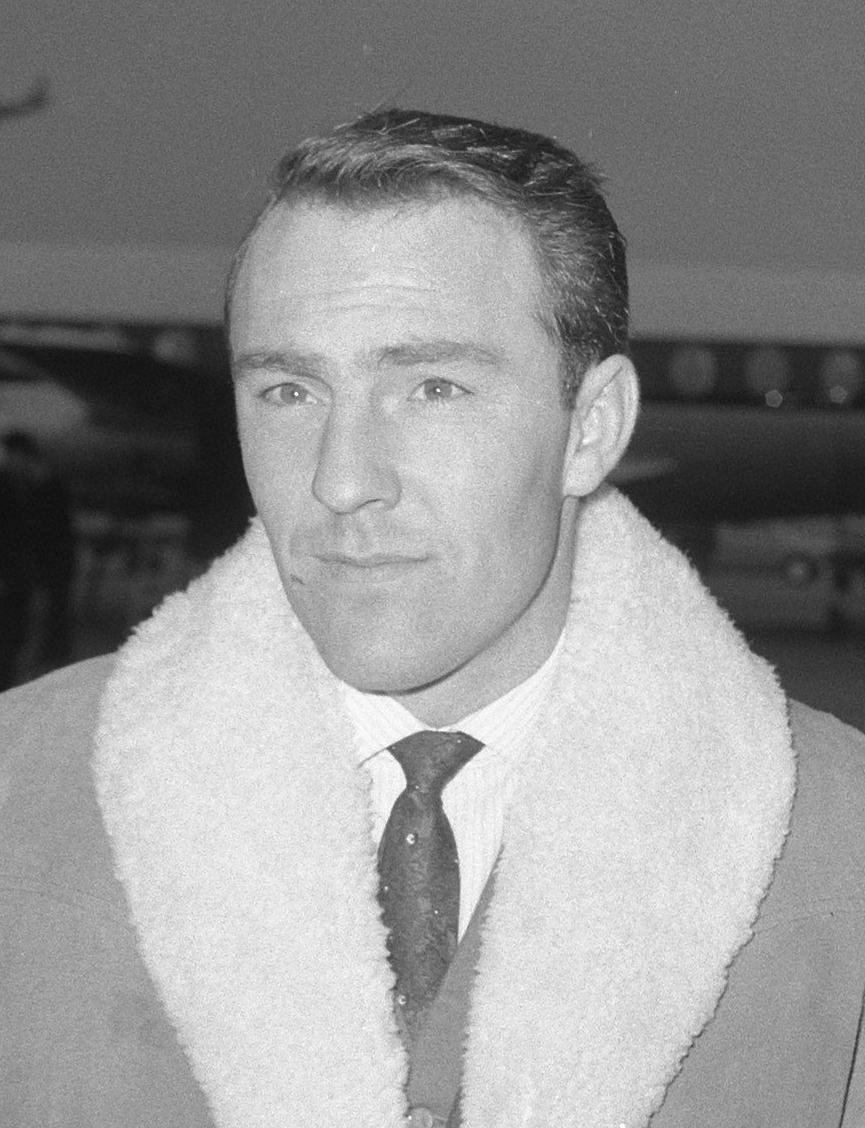
All time record goal scorer Jimmy Greaves who scored 357 goals in 516 matches. He is the record holder of top scorer awards with six and record league goalscorer for Tottenham Hotspur still, with 220.

The Football League Division One from 1888 through to the end of the 1991–92 season and now the Premier League, make up the top tier in English football. During these 137 years three players have scored over 300 goals, with another 25 scoring over 200 goals. A further three players were a goal shy, finishing on 199 goals. The first was Sheffield Wednesday's Andrew Wilson whose career was interrupted by World War I but went onto make 501 appearances. In the mid-sixties, Bobby Smith retired after scoring 23 in 74 for Chelsea and 176 in 271 for Tottenham, and finally ten years later, England legend Bobby Charlton, left Manchester United after making 606 appearances.

Derby County forward Steve Bloomer was the first player to score over 300 goals, his record of 314 stood for over half a century. In 14 years, he scored 240 goals in 376 matches in his first stint at Derby County before moving to Middlesbrough where he scored 59 in 125 games for the Boro. After five years on Teesside, he returned to Derby who were in the second division then. He spent two years in the second division scoring 38 goals before the Rams won promotion. In his final two seasons he scored a further 15 goals in 34 matches, a total of 255 in 410 appearances for Derby County. Everton striker Dixie Dean came very close to breaking the record, he scored 349 league goals all for Everton, however 39 were scored in the second division, leaving him 4 goals behind. Bloomers' achievement was finally surpassed when Jimmy Greaves broke the record scoring 357 goals, playing for Chelsea, Tottenham Hotspur and West Ham United. For Chelsea he scored 124 goals in 157 appearances, only Frank Lampard 147, Roy Bentley 130, and Bobby Tambling 129 have scored more top flight goals for Chelsea. Greaves moved on to Tottenham Hotspur where, to this day, remains Tottenham's top league goalscorer after scoring 220 goals in 321 appearances. His top flight career ended at West Ham United, where he scored 13 in 38 matches.

In the Premier League era, Alan Shearer sits top, but even with his full tally of 283 goals, he still trails. Four more "modern day" players, who have played in the Premier League make the list, Wayne Rooney, the third highest Premier League goalscorer with 208 goals for Everton and Manchester United, is 22nd. Liverpool legend Ian Rush is the 14th highest scorer in the history of top flight football, but his Premier League tally is only 48 goals, ranking him 144th. Another player to lose goals is Tony Cottee, who sits in 18th place. His last 78 goals gives him a current PL ranking of 62. Apart from these three, a further 20 players, who have scored 100 or more goals, have lesser totals. Ranked 45th, Lee Chapman scored 177 goals, the same as Frank Lampard and two more than Thierry Henry, but his last 23 goals sees him in 365th place in the Premier League. Peter Beardsley and Matt Le Tissier (jointly ranked 71st), both scored 161 goals, 11 more than Michael Owen who is eleventh on the PL list. Beardsley is in 97th position with 58 goals in the Premier League while a lack of centurions, assists Le Tissier's ranking. Losing 61 goals improves his overall position, ranked 34th in the Premier League with 100 goals.

The most recent active player in the Top 50 is Mohamed Salah; his goal against Leicester City on Boxing day, 2024, was his 173rd, moving the Egyptian winger inside the top 50. Recently, former Tottenham Hotspur striker Harry Kane, scored 30 goals in his last season in England to move above players such as Dennis Viollet, Ray Charnley who both had 190 goals, Peter Harris, who scored 192 goals for Portsmouth, Stan Mortensen who scored 197 goals for Blackpool, George Elliott who scored 198 goals for Middlesbrough and the three players mentioned above who all scored 199 goals. Kane, ranked 19th, became only the 28th player in 136 years of league football to join the elite 200 club, who, in the summer of 2023, signed for German club Bayern Munich.

First Division/Premier League top 50 goalscorers

Rank	Player	Goals	Apps	Ratio	Years	Club(s) (goals/apps)
1	(England) Jimmy Greaves	357	516	0.64	1957–1971	Chelsea (124/157), Tottenham Hotspur (220/321), West Ham United (13/38)
2	(England) Steve Bloomer	314	535	0.59	1892–1914	Derby County (255/410), Middlesbrough (59/125)
3	(England) Dixie Dean	310	362	0.86	1924–1938	Everton
4	(South Africa) Gordon Hodgson	288	455	0.63	1925–1940	Liverpool (233/359), Aston Villa (4/15), Leeds United (51/81)
5	(England) Alan Shearer	283	559	0.51	1988–2006	Southampton (23/118), Blackburn Rovers (112/138), Newcastle United (148/303)
6	(England) Charlie Buchan	258	481	0.54	1912–1928	Sunderland (209/379), Arsenal (49/102)
7	(England) David Jack	257	476	0.54	1920–1934	Bolton Wanderers (144/295), Arsenal (113/181)
8	(England) Nat Lofthouse	255	452	0.56	1946–1960	Bolton Wanderers
9	(England) Joe Bradford	248	410	0.6	1921–1935	Birmingham City
10	(Scotland) Hughie Gallacher	246	355	0.69	1925–1938	Newcastle United (133/160), Chelsea (72/132), Derby County (38/51), Grimsby Town (3/12)
11	(England) Joe Smith	243	416	0.58	1908–1927	Bolton Wanderers
12	(England) George Brown	240	366	0.66	1921–1935	Huddersfield Town (142/213), Aston Villa (79/116), Leeds United (19/37)
13	(England) George Camsell	233	337	0.69	1927–1939	Middlesbrough
14	(Wales) Ian Rush	232	515	0.45	1980–1998	Liverpool (229/469), Leeds United (3/36), Newcastle United (0/10)
15	(Scotland) David Herd	222	412	0.54	1954–1970	Arsenal (97/166), Manchester United (114/202), Stoke City (11/44)
16	(England) Harry Hampton	219	357	0.61	1904–1922	Aston Villa (215/339), Birmingham City (4/18)
17	(England) Billy Walker	214	478	0.45	1919–1933	Aston Villa
17	(England) Tony Cottee	214	548	0.39	1982–2001	West Ham United (115/279), Everton (72/184), Leicester City (27/85)
19	(England) Harry Kane	213	320	0.67	2012–2023	Tottenham Hotspur (213/317), Norwich City (0/3)
20	(Scotland) Dave Halliday	211	257	0.82	1925–1933	Sunderland (156/166), Arsenal (8/15), Manchester City (47/76)
21	(England) Geoff Hurst	210	519	0.4	1959–1975	West Ham United (180/411), Stoke City (30/108)
22	(England) Ronnie Allen	208	415	0.5	1950–1961	West Bromwich Albion
22	(England) Wayne Rooney	208	491	0.42	2002–2018	Everton (25/98), Manchester United (183/393)
24	(England) Bobby Gurney	205	348	0.59	1926–1944	Sunderland
25	(England) Arthur Chandler	203	309	0.66	1925–1935	Leicester City
25	(England) Vic Watson	203	295	0.69	1923–1936	West Ham United
27	(England) Harry Johnson	201	313	0.64	1919–1931	Sheffield United
27	(Scotland) Denis Law	201	377	0.53	1960–1974	Manchester City (30/68), Manchester United (171/309)
29	(England) Bobby Smith	199	345	0.58	1950–1965	Chelsea (23/74), Tottenham Hotspur (176/271)
29	(Scotland) Andrew Wilson	199	501	0.4	1900–1920	Sheffield Wednesday
29	(England) Bobby Charlton	199	606	0.33	1956–1975	Manchester United
32	(England) George Elliott	198	327	0.61	1909–1925	Middlesbrough
33	(England) Stan Mortensen	197	317	0.62	1946–1959	Blackpool
34	(Egypt) Mohamed Salah	193	328	0.59	2013–2026	Chelsea (2/13), Liverpool (191/315)
35	(England) Peter Harris	192	468	0.41	1946–1960	Portsmouth
36	(England) Ray Charnley	190	359	0.53	1954–1972	Blackpool
36	(England) Dennis Viollet	190	391	0.49	1953–1967	Manchester United (159/259), Stoke City (31/132)
38	(England) Tommy Thompson	187	354	0.53	1947–1964	Newcastle United (4/16), Aston Villa (67/149), Preston North End (116/189)
38	(England) Andy Cole	187	415	0.45	1992–2007	Arsenal (0/1), Newcastle United (43/58), Manchester United (93/195), Blackburn Rovers (27/83), Fulham (12/31), Manchester City (9/22), Portsmouth (3/18), Sunderland (0/7)
40	(England) Jack Bowers	186	255	0.73	1928–1939	Derby County (167/203), Leicester City (19/52)
41	(Argentina) Sergio Agüero	184	275	0.67	2011–2021	Manchester City
42	(England) Tony Brown	179	459	0.39	1963–1980	West Bromwich Albion
42	(England) Teddy Sheringham	179	521	0.34	1988–2007	Millwall (20/64), Nottingham Forest (14/42), Tottenham Hotspur (97/236), Manchester United (31/104), Portsmouth (9/32), West Ham United (8/43)
44	(England) Ginger Richardson	178	269	0.66	1928–1946	West Bromwich Albion
45	(England) Lee Chapman	177	508	0.35	1979–1995	Stoke City (34/99), Arsenal (4/23), Sunderland (3/15), Sheffield Wednesday (63/149), Nottingham Forest (15/48), Leeds United (50/118), West Ham United (7/40), Ipswich Town (1/16)
45	(England) Frank Lampard	177	609	0.29	1995–2015	West Ham United (24/148), Chelsea (147/429), Manchester City (6/32)
47	(France) Thierry Henry	175	258	0.68	1999–2012	Arsenal
47	(England) Billy Hibbert	175	387	0.45	1906–1922	Bury (99/178), Newcastle United (46/139), Bradford City (26/53), Oldham Athletic (4/17)
47	(Northern Ireland) Derek Dougan	175	458	0.38	1957–1975	Blackburn Rovers (26/59), Leicester City (35/68), Wolverhampton Wanderers (86/247), Portsmouth (9/33), Aston Villa (19/51)
50	(England) Jack Rowley	173	351	0.49	1937–1957	Manchester United
50	(England) Peter Dobing	173	509	0.34	1955–1973	Blackburn Rovers (60/120), Manchester City (31/82), Stoke City (82/307)

Lee Chapman holds the record of most top flight clubs scored for with eight. Andy Cole played for eight clubs also, but only scored for six. Marcus Bent is another player to play for eight top flight clubs, again only scoring for six. A name that does not appear on the top scorer list is Arthur Rowley, the record holder for the most goals in league football, scoring 434 goals in 619 league games. Arthur's brother Jack Rowley scored 173 goals for Manchester United and is ranked 50th, shown above. Arthur however didn't play much top flight football in his career, but he did score 51 goals in 95 matches. In one season at Fulham he scored eight in 34 appearances and then later hit 43 in 61 appearances over two seasons for Leicester City.

== Club's top scorers in top tier ==
The start of the Football League saw 12 teams become the founding members of the first ever league season in 1888–89. These were Accrington, Blackburn Rovers, Bolton Wanderers, Burnley, Everton, Preston North End, Aston Villa, Derby County, Notts County, Stoke City, West Bromwich Albion and Wolverhampton Wanderers. Since then, 65 clubs have played at the top level, with only four Premier League players breaking club records set in the football league. Thierry Henry surpassed the 150 goals scored by Cliff Bastin for Arsenal. Roy Bentley, who scored 130 goals for Chelsea, was surpassed by Frank Lampard, while Sergio Agüero overtook the 147 goals Eric Brook scored for Manchester City. Matt Le Tissier scored in both the First Division and the Premier League to become Southampton's top scorer, exceeding the 134-goal record set by Welshman Ron Davies. Danny Welbeck scored 46 goals for Brighton & Hove Albion, 9 above previous record holder Michael Robinson's tally of 37. The Premier League's top three goalscorers, who all have scored over 200 goals, fail to appear; Alan Shearer finished nine goals adrift of Blackburn's Ted Harper and finished two short of Newcastle legend Jackie Milburn, Wayne Rooney was sixteen short of Bobby Charlton's record for Manchester United, and Harry Kane departed Tottenham Hotspur with 213 goals, leaving Jimmy Greaves as the club's record top flight scorer.

Club	Player	Goals	Years
Accrington	(Scotland) Billy Barbour	33	1888–1890
Arsenal	(France) Thierry Henry	175	1999–2012
Aston Villa	(England) Harry Hampton	215	1904–1920
Barnsley	(England) Neal Redfearn	10	1991–1998
Birmingham City	(England) Joe Bradford	248	1920–1935
Blackburn Rovers	(England) Ted Harper	121	1923–1934
Blackpool	(England) Stan Mortensen	197	1941–1955
Bolton Wanderers	(England) Nat Lofthouse	255	1946–1960
Bournemouth	(Norway) Josh King	48	2015–2021
Bradford City	(Scotland) Frank O'Rourke	63	1920–1921
Bradford Park Avenue	(Scotland) David McLean	49	1919–1922
Brentford	(Scotland) Dave McCulloch	85	1935–1938
Brighton & Hove Albion	(England) Danny Welbeck	46	2020–2026
Bristol City	(Scotland) Sam Gilligan	44	1904–1910
Burnley	(England) George Beel	142	1923–1932
Bury	(England) Billy Hibbert	99	1906–1911
Cardiff City	(Wales) Len Davies	117	1919–1931
Carlisle United	(England) Joe Laidlaw	12	1972–1976
Charlton Athletic	(England) Charles Vaughan	91	1946–1953
Chelsea	(England) Frank Lampard	147	2001–2014
Coventry City	(England) Dion Dublin	61	1994–1998
Crystal Palace	(Ivory Coast) Wilfried Zaha	68	2010–2023
Darwen	(England) John McKnight	11	1893–1894
Derby County	(England) Steve Bloomer	255	1891–1914
Everton	(England) Dixie Dean	310	1925–1937
Fulham	(Scotland) Graham Leggat	106	1958–1966
Glossop	(England) Arthur Goddard	7	1899-1900
Grimsby Town	(Wales) Pat Glover	117	1929–1939
Huddersfield Town	(England) George Brown	142	1921–1929
Hull City	(Croatia) Nikica Jelavić	13	2014–2015
Ipswich Town	(Scotland) John Wark	107	1974–1990
Leeds United	(Scotland) Peter Lorimer	151	1962–1979
Leicester City	(England) Arthur Chandler	203	1923–1935

Club	Player name	Goals	Years
Leyton Orient	(England) Dave Dunmore	11	1961–1964
Liverpool	(England) Gordon Hodgson	233	1925–1936
Luton Town	(England) Gordon Turner	101	1949–1964
Manchester City	(Argentina) Sergio Agüero	184	2011–2021
Manchester United	(England) Bobby Charlton	199	1956–1973
Middlesbrough	(England) George Camsell	233	1925–1939
Millwall	(Republic of Ireland) Tony Cascarino	22	1987–1990
Newcastle United	(England) Jackie Milburn	150	1946–1957
Northampton Town	(England) Bobby Brown	9	1963–1966
Norwich City	(England) John Deehan	48	1981–1986
Notts County	(England) Trevor Christie	41	1979–1984
Nottingham Forest	(Wales) Grenville Morris	152	1898–1913
Oldham Athletic	(England) Joe Walters	35	1912–1919
Oxford United	(Republic of Ireland) John Aldridge	38	1984–1987
Portsmouth	(England) Peter Harris	193	1946–1960
Preston North End	(England) Tom Finney	164	1946–1960
Queens Park Rangers	(England) Les Ferdinand	80	1987–1995
Reading	(Republic of Ireland) Kevin Doyle	19	2005–2009
Sheffield United	(England) Harry Johnson	201	1916–1931
Sheffield Wednesday	(Scotland) Andrew Wilson	199	1900–1920
Southampton	(England) Matt Le Tissier	161	1986–2002
Stoke City	(England) Freddie Steele	140	1933–1949
Sunderland	(England) Charlie Buchan	209	1911–1925
Swansea City	(Ivory Coast) Wilfried Bony	27	2013–2019
Swindon Town	(Norway) Jan Age Fjortoft	12	1993–1995
Tottenham Hotspur	(England) Jimmy Greaves	220	1961–1970
Watford	(England) Luther Blissett	70	1975–1988
West Bromwich Albion	(England) Ronnie Allen	208	1950–1961
West Ham United	(England) Vic Watson	203	1920–1935
Wigan Athletic	(Colombia) Hugo Rodallega	24	2009–2012
Wimbledon	(England) John Fashanu	103	1986–1994
Wolverhampton Wanderers	(England) Johnny Hancocks	158	1946–1957

== Top five scorers by nationality/region ==
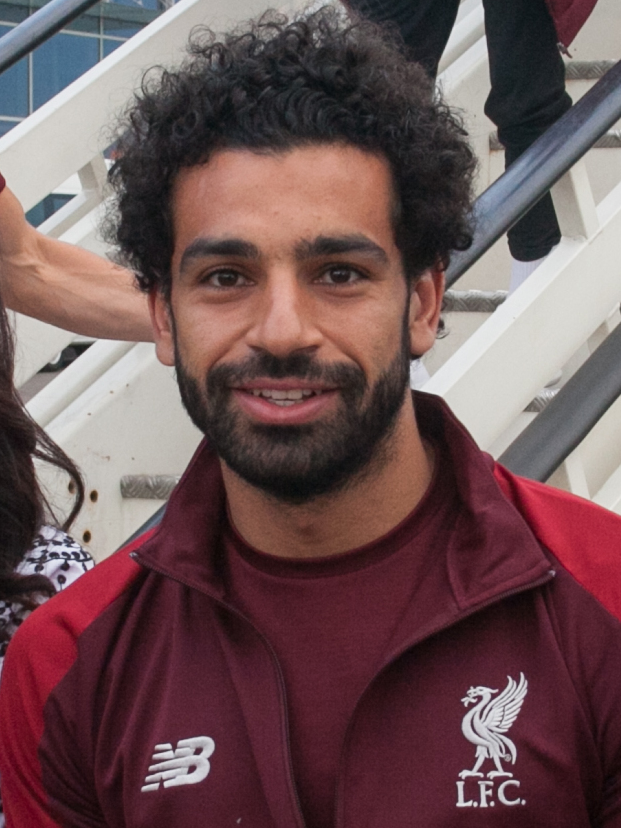
With 193 goals, Liverpool winger Mohamed Salah is currently the highest foreign goalscorer in English top flight history.

Many nationalities have played in English top flight football throughout the years. The tables below show the top five highest scorers from their respective countries or region. As shown in the top 50 list above, the top English and Scottish goal scorers can be seen.

Of the home nation countries, players from the Premier League era are well short of the overall records. Northern Ireland's top scorer is Iain Dowie, who scored 33 of his 57 goals in the Premier League. The top Welsh goal scorer is Ryan Giggs, who scored 114 goals (109 in the Premier League), while Duncan Ferguson with 68 goals is the top Scottish goalscorer in the Premier League. These numbers all fall short of the record top flight totals set by Derek Dougan, Ian Rush and Hughie Gallacher. Elsewhere, Republic of Ireland striker Robbie Keane scored 126 goals in the Premier League, but ended with 10 goals less than record holder Frank Stapleton.

A different story occurs with the rest of the world, made up predominately of Premier League-era players only. South American George Robledo's record remains from the 1950s, and he is currently the joint third-highest South American goalscorer. Craig Johnston has been overtaken by Premier League Oceanic players, while Lindy Delapenha also lost his Caribbean record. American Roy Wegerle has dropped to second in the United States and Canada scorers; his goals span the switch to the Premier League. The top European and African scorers are all from the Premier League era.

When Dwight Yorke scored a hat-trick for Manchester United against Leicester City, on 17 January 1999, he became the league's top foreign scorer. With this treble, he moved onto 84 top flight goals, surpassing the previous record of 82, set by Chilean George Robledo in 1953. Later that year, on 18 December 1999, Yorke scored twice for Manchester United in a 4–2 away win at West Ham United. His first goal that day saw him become the first foreign player to score 100 top flight goals in England. This was his 27th league goal for Manchester United, after scoring 73 previously for Aston Villa. As of 2026, his 136 goals ranks him as the fifth-highest foreign goalscorer, behind Mohamed Salah's 193, Sergio Agüero's 184, Thierry Henry's 175 and Robin van Persie's 144.

- **Bold** shows players currently playing in the Premier League.

As of 24 May 2026

Northern Ireland

Rank	Player	Goals	Apps	Ratio	Years	Club(s) (goals/apps)	Ref.
1	Derek Dougan	**175**	458	0.38	1957–1975	Blackburn Rovers (26/59), Leicester City (35/68), Wolverhampton Wanderers (86/247), Portsmouth (9/33), Aston Villa (19/51)	
2	Jimmy Dunne	**153**	201	0.76	1926–1937	Sheffield United (143/173), Arsenal (10/28)	
3	George Best	**137**	361	0.38	1963–1977	Manchester United	
4	Billy Gillespie	**127**	448	0.28	1910–1933	Sheffield United	
5	Jimmy McIlroy	**126**	519	0.24	1950–1967	Burnley (116/439), Stoke City (10/80)	

Republic of Ireland

Rank	Player	Goals	Apps	Ratio	Years	Club(s) (goals/apps)	Ref.
1	Frank Stapleton	**136**	458	0.3	1974–1995	Arsenal (75/225), Manchester United (60/223), Derby County (1/10)	
2	Robbie Keane	**126**	349	0.36	1997–2012	Coventry City (12/31), Leeds United (13/46), Tottenham Hotspur (91/238), Liverpool (5/19), West Ham United (2/9), Aston Villa (3/6)	
3	Niall Quinn	**109**	399	0.27	1983–2002	Arsenal (14/67), Manchester City (66/193), Sunderland (29/139)	
4	Johnny Giles	**91**	479	0.19	1959–1976	Manchester United (10/99), Leeds United (80/343), West Bromwich Albion (1/37)	
5	John Aldridge	**88**	147	0.6	1985–1989	Oxford United (38/64), Liverpool (50/83)	

Wales

Rank	Player	Goals	Apps	Ratio	Years	Club(s) (goals/apps)	Ref.
1	Ian Rush	**232**	515	0.45	1980–1998	Liverpool (229/469), Leeds United (3/36), Newcastle United (0/10)	
2	Trevor Ford	**169**	324	0.52	1946–1961	Aston Villa (60/120), Sunderland (67/108), Cardiff City (42/96)	
3	Grenville Morris	**152**	332	0.46	1897–1913	Nottingham Forest	
4	Mark Hughes	**149**	531	0.28	1980–2002	Manchester United (120/345), Chelsea (25/95), Southampton (2/52), Everton (1/18), Blackburn Rovers (1/21)	
5	Roy Vernon	**145**	315	0.46	1955–1970	Blackburn Rovers (22/51), Everton (101/176), Stoke City (22/88)	

Continental Europe

Rank	Player	Goals	Apps	Ratio	Years	Club(s) (goals/apps)	Ref.
1	(France) Thierry Henry	**175**	258	0.68	1994–2012	Arsenal	
2	(Netherlands) Robin van Persie	**144**	280	0.51	2004–2015	Arsenal (96/194), Manchester United (48/86)	
3	(Netherlands) Jimmy Floyd Hasselbaink	**127**	288	0.44	1997–2007	Leeds United (34/69), Chelsea (69/136), Middlesbrough (22/58), Charlton Athletic (2/25)	
4	(France) Nicolas Anelka	**125**	364	0.34	1996–2014	Arsenal (23/65), Manchester City (37/89), Chelsea (38/125), Liverpool (4/20), Bolton Wanderers (21/53), West Bromwich Albion (2/12)	
5	(Belgium) Romelu Lukaku	**121**	278	0.44	2011–2022	West Bromwich Albion (17/35), Everton (68/141), Manchester United (28/66), Chelsea (8/36)	

South America

Rank	Player	Goals	Apps	Ratio	Years	Club(s) (goals/apps)	Ref.
1	(Argentina) Sergio Agüero	**184**	275	0.67	2011–2021	Manchester City	
2	(Argentina) Carlos Tevez	**84**	202	0.42	2006–2013	West Ham United (7/26), Manchester United (19/63), Manchester City (58/113)	
3	(Chile) George Robledo	**82**	146	0.56	1949–1953	Newcastle United	
3	(Brazil) Roberto Firmino	**82**	256	0.32	2015–2023	Liverpool	
5	(Brazil) Gabriel Jesus	**79**	243	0.33	2017–2026	Manchester City (58/159), Arsenal (21/84)	

Africa

Rank	Player	Goals	Apps	Ratio	Years	Club(s) (goals/apps)	Ref.
1	(Egypt) Mohamed Salah	**193**	328	0.59	2013–2026	Chelsea (2/13), Liverpool (191/315)	
2	(Senegal) Sadio Mané	**111**	263	0.42	2014–2022	Southampton (21/67), Liverpool (90/196)	
3	(Ivory Coast) Didier Drogba	**104**	254	0.41	2004–2012	Chelsea	
4	(Togo) Emmanuel Adebayor	**97**	242	0.4	2005–2016	Arsenal (46/104), Manchester City (15/34), Tottenham Hotspur (35/92), Crystal Palace (1/12)	
5	(Nigeria) Yakubu	**95**	252	0.38	2003–2012	Portsmouth (28/67), Middlesbrough (25/73), Everton (25/82), Blackburn Rovers (17/30)	

Oceania

Rank	Player	Goals	Apps	Ratio	Years	Club(s) (goals/apps)	Ref.
1	(Australia) Mark Viduka	**92**	240	0.38	2000–2009	Leeds United (59/130), Middlesbrough (26/72), Newcastle United (7/38)	
1	(New Zealand) **Chris Wood**	**92**	278	0.33	2009–	West Bromwich Albion (0/3), Leicester City (1/7), Burnley (49/144), Newcastle United (4/35), Nottingham Forest (38/89)	
3	(Australia) Harry Kewell	**57**	274	0.21	1993–2008	Leeds United (45/181), Liverpool (12/93)	
4	(Australia) Tim Cahill	**56**	226	0.25	2004–2012	Everton	
5	(Australia) Craig Johnston	**46**	254	0.18	1977–1988	Middlesbrough (16/64), Liverpool (30/190)	

North America

Rank	Player	Goals	Apps	Ratio	Years	Club(s) (goals/apps)	Ref.
1	(Trinidad and Tobago) Dwight Yorke	**136**	423	0.32	1989–2009	Aston Villa (73/231), Manchester United (48/92), Blackburn Rovers (12/60), Birmingham City (2/13), Sunderland (1/27)	
2	(Mexico) Raúl Jiménez	**68**	233	0.29	2018–2026	Wolverhampton Wanderers (40/135), Fulham (28/98)	
2	(Jamaica) Michail Antonio	**68**	268	0.25	2008–2025	West Ham United	
4	(Jamaica) Robbie Earle	**59**	283	0.21	1991–2000	Wimbledon	
5	(United States) Clint Dempsey	**57**	218	0.26	2007–2013	Fulham (50/189), Tottenham Hotspur (7/29),	

Asia

Rank	Player	Goals	Apps	Ratio	Years	Club(s) (goals/apps)	Ref.
1	(South Korea) Son Heung-min	**127**	333	0.38	2015–2025	Tottenham Hotspur	
2	(Israel) Yossi Benayoun	**31**	194	0.16	2005–2014	West Ham United (8/75), Liverpool (18/92), Chelsea (1/8), Arsenal (4/19)	
3	(Israel) Ronny Rosenthal	**25**	162	0.15	1990–1997	Liverpool (21/74), Tottenham Hotspur (4/88)	
4	(South Korea) Hwang Hee-chan	**24**	133	0.18	2021–2026	Wolverhampton Wanderers	
5	(Japan) **Kaoru Mitoma**	**23**	113	0.2	2022–	Brighton & Hove Albion	

== Players with 100 or more goals ==
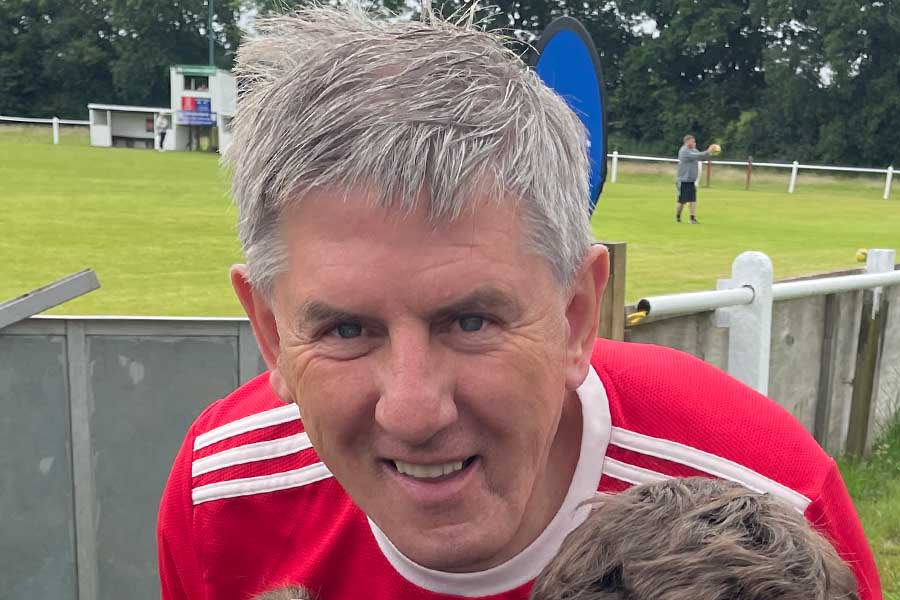
Peter Beardsley scored 161 goals in the first tier: 88 goals for Newcastle United, 46 for Liverpool, 25 for Everton and 2 for Bolton Wanderers.

As of 2026, a total of 256 players have scored 100 or more goals in the English first tier. Erling Haaland in the 2025–26 season became the latest player to reach a century of goals, all scored for Manchester City.

Starting in 1992–93, the Premier League was established as the first tier English football competition, replacing the Football League First Division. The Premier League does not include matches prior to its establishment in record-keeping, which has been criticized. In a 2016 interview published in the Irish Independent, former Leeds United legend Johnny Giles stated "What other sport wipes out 100 years of records and standards and decides that Alan Shearer was the first player to score 100 goals for two clubs when Jimmy Greaves did it decades before? In no other sport in England is there such a casual disregard and disrespect for the achievements of players who inhabit the archives..."

Of the 256 players to score 100 or more goals in the English first tier:

- 214 players scored 100 or more goals in the First Division prior to the 1992–93 season.
- 35 players have scored 100 or more goals in the Premier League since 1992–93. (Note: See also: List of footballers with 100 or more Premier League goals)
- 7 players that scored fewer than 100 goals in either the First Division or the Premier League separately scored 100 or more goals in total in the first tier.

== Player records ==
All records listed below pertain to league matches played in Division 1 and/or the Premier League only.

Most goals in a season:

- 42 matches – 60 Dixie Dean, Everton 1927–28
- 38 matches – 38 Bert Freeman, Everton 1908–09

Most goals in a debut season:

- 42 matches – 38 Dave Halliday, Sunderland 1925–26
- 38 matches – 36 Erling Haaland, Manchester City 2022–23

Most penalties scored: 56 Alan Shearer (from 67 taken for Blackburn Rovers and Newcastle United, 1992–2006)

Most penalties scored in 1 season: 13 Francis Lee, Manchester City 1971–72

Most consecutive Top Scorer awards: 3

- Jimmy Greaves (1963, 1964, 1965)
- Alan Shearer (1995, 1996, 1997)
- Thierry Henry (2004, 2005, 2006)

Most top scorer awards with different clubs: 3 Gary Lineker (Leicester City 1985, Everton 1986, Tottenham Hotspur 1990)

100 goals for two clubs: 3

- David Jack 1919–34 (Bolton Wanderers 144 – Arsenal 113)
- Jimmy Greaves 1957–1970 (Chelsea 124 – Tottenham Hotspur 220)
- Alan Shearer 1992–2006 (Blackburn Rovers 112 – Newcastle United 148)

Fastest player to reach 100 goals: Dave Halliday in 101 games for Sunderland.

Players to score over 30 league goals in four consecutive seasons: Dave Halliday, 1925–26 to 1928–29. Halliday scored at least 35 goals in each of those four seasons.

== See also ==
- List of footballers with 100 or more Premier League goals
- List of footballers in England by number of league goals
- Football records and statistics in England
- Premier League Golden Boot
