= Billy Hibbert =

English footballer

Personal information
- Full name: William Hibbert
- Date of birth: 21 September 1884
- Place of birth: Golborne, England
- Date of death: 16 March 1949 (aged 64)
- Place of death: Blackpool, England
- Height: 5 ft 8 in (1.73 m)
- Position: Centre forward

Youth career
- Golborne Juniors

Senior career*
Years	Team	Apps	(Gls)
- Newton-le-Willows
- Brynn Central
1906–1911	Bury	178	(99)
1911–1920	Newcastle United	139	(46)
- → Sheffield Wednesday (guest)
	→ Leeds City (guest)	0	(0)
1920–1922	Bradford City	53	(26)
1922	Oldham Athletic	16	(4)
1923	Fall River	4	(1)
1923–1926	J&P Coats	56	(24)
- Burscough Rangers
1927	Real Gimnástico CF		
Total		443	(200)

International career
1910	England	1	(0)
- * Club domestic league appearances and goals

William Hibbert (21 September 1884 – 16 March 1949) was a professional footballer who played as centre forward and was capped once for England.

== Club career ==
Born in Golborne, Lancashire, Hibbert started his junior career with Golborne Juniors in 1902, joining Newton-le-Willows the following year then Brynn Central in 1905 in the Lancashire Combination league. On 3 May 1906, he signed for First Division club Bury, becoming their top scorer four consecutive seasons. He made his debut against Middlesbrough in September, scoring in his first four league appearances finishing with 12 in his debut season. The following season he hit hat-tricks against Bolton Wanderers and Preston North End in his total of 20. He scored 26 goals in the 1908-09 season that included hat-tricks against Sunderland (4) and Notts County. Two more hat-tricks came the next season against Middlesbrough and Tottenham Hotspur as he finished the 1909-10 season with 21 goals. A treble against Manchester City in his 19 goals that season meant he finished as Bury's top scorer for the fourth time. At Gigg Lane, Hibbert scored 99 goals, of which seven were from the penalty spot, and included seven hat-tricks, in 178 league games and a further six goals in ten FA Cup appearances. Bury were struggling financially and were relegated at the end of the 1911-12 season. Hibbert scored his final goal this season before leaving in October 1911 when Newcastle United paid a record £1,950 fee for his services after 105 goals in 188 appearances for the Shakers.

Hibbert wasn't as prolific on Tyneside, he finished the 1911-12 season having played 27 league games netting 15 times which saw him score a hat-trick in a 5-2 home win over Bolton Wanderers. The following season he only managed 3 goals in 23 league games and 1 in 6 FA Cup games. He found the net 6 times in 35 games in the 1913-14 season before a return to more like his goal-scoring best in 1914-15, the final season before WW1 took over. He scored 13 in 30 league games and twice in six FA Cup ties. During the First World War, Hibbert made guest appearances for both Sheffield Wednesday and Leeds City. On resumption of the Football League he scored 9 times in 24 matches, including two hat-tricks against Liverpool and Bradford Park Avenue, in what proved to be his final season with the Magpies. He had played 139 league games and scored 46 goals and scored another 3 goals in 16 FA Cup appearances.

On 12 May 1920 he signed for Bradford City on a free transfer, and he was at his prolific best in his two seasons there, scoring 26 goals in 53 matches. Trebles against Bolton Wanderers and Huddersfield Town (4) took his hat-trick total to 12. He also scored another 2 goals in 6 FA Cup games. Bradford City were relegated at the end of the 1921-22 season and Hibbert moved to First Division Oldham Athletic on 21 May 1922. He stayed at Boundary Park for just one season until the Latics also were relegated. He scored 4 for the club, bettered only by Jimmy Marshall with 6.

Like many at the time, he crossed the Atlantic to the United States to play in the embryonic American Soccer League with Fall River and J&P Coats. After three years in the states, he returned to play, and captain non league Burscough Rangers before a coaching role saw him move to Spain to join Real Gimnastico in 1927. After a year in Spain he returned to England, signing for Wigan Borough as a fitness coach.

When Hibbert retired from football in England he had scored 175 goals in 387 appearances, all in the first division. Only six players, Steve Bloomer, Charlie Buchan, Joe Smith, Harry Hampton, Andrew Wilson and George Elliott had scored more top flight goals. A century later Hibbert's goal scoring record ranks him inside the top 50 and his hat-trick record of 12 is only bettered by 12 other players.

== National team ==
He also won one international cap for England against Scotland on 2 April 1910 in a 2–0 defeat.

== Manager ==
After his playing career finished he was a coach in the United States of America, Spain and at Wigan Borough. He died in Blackpool, England, on 16 March 1949.

== Personal life ==
His brother-in-law was Joe Shaw who played more than 300 games for Arsenal.
