= 1999–2000 Northern Football League =

The 1999–2000 Northern Football League season was the 102nd in the history of Northern Football League, a football competition in England.

== Division One ==
Northern Football League Division One
- Season: 1999–2000
- Champions: Bedlington Terriers
- Relegated: Thornaby-On-Tees; Shotton Comrades; South Shields
- Matches: 380
- Goals: 1,174 (3.09 per match)

Division One featured 17 clubs which competed in the division last season, along with three new clubs, promoted from Division Two:

- Durham City
- Peterlee Newtown
- Shotton Comrades

Also, Stockton changed name to Thornaby-On-Tees.

=== League table ===
Pos	Team	Pld	W	D	L	GF	GA	GD	Pts	Promotion or relegation
1	Bedlington Terriers	38	25	8	5	89	25	+64	83	
2	Seaham Red Star	38	23	5	10	63	49	+14	74	
3	Dunston Federation Brewery	38	20	7	11	72	41	+31	67	
4	Marske United	38	19	8	11	67	44	+23	65	
5	West Auckland Town	38	17	14	7	65	43	+22	65	
6	Billingham Synthonia	38	17	6	15	72	64	+8	57	
7	Jarrow Roofing BCA	38	15	12	11	64	61	+3	57	
8	Morpeth Town	38	14	15	9	55	56	−1	57	
9	Consett	38	12	18	8	57	43	+14	54	
10	Tow Law Town	38	15	8	15	65	55	+10	53	
11	Billingham Town	38	13	13	12	58	47	+11	52	
12	Guisborough Town	38	15	7	16	57	61	−4	52	
13	Chester-le-Street Town	38	14	9	15	57	67	−10	51	
14	Crook Town	38	13	11	14	55	57	−2	50	
15	Durham City	38	11	13	14	50	61	−11	46	
16	Peterlee Newtown	38	13	7	18	56	76	−20	46	
17	Easington Colliery	38	10	11	17	56	73	−17	41	
18	Thornaby-on-Tees	38	7	12	19	47	68	−21	33	Relegated to Division Two
19	Shotton Comrades	38	4	9	25	36	88	−52	21	Relegated to Division Two
20	South Shields	38	3	7	28	33	95	−62	16	Relegated to Division Two

Source: fchd
Rules for classification: 1) points; 2) goal difference; 3) number of goals scored.

== Division Two ==
Northern Football League Division Two
- Season: 1999–2000
- Champions: Brandon United
- Promoted: Brandon United; Newcastle Blue Star; Hebburn
- Matches: 342
- Goals: 1,218 (3.56 per match)

Division Two featured 16 clubs which competed in the division last season, along with three new clubs, relegated from Division One:

- Newcastle Blue Star
- Penrith
- Shildon

Also, Ryhope CA changed name to Kennek Ryhope CA, while Washington changed name to Washington Ikeda Hoover.

=== League table ===
Pos	Team	Pld	W	D	L	GF	GA	GD	Pts	Promotion or relegation
1	Brandon United	36	25	9	2	82	24	+58	84	Promoted to Division One
2	Newcastle Blue Star	36	24	5	7	94	43	+51	77	Promoted to Division One
3	Hebburn	36	22	4	10	72	35	+37	70	Promoted to Division One
4	Northallerton Town	36	21	5	10	76	48	+28	68	
5	Shildon	36	20	7	9	62	44	+18	67	
6	Willington	36	21	3	12	81	41	+40	66	
7	Washington Ikeda Hoover	36	19	7	10	95	57	+38	64	
8	Norton & Stockton Ancients	36	18	8	10	70	51	+19	62	
9	Ashington	36	17	10	9	92	36	+56	61	
10	Penrith	36	15	11	10	69	40	+29	56	
11	Alnwick Town	36	16	7	13	78	58	+20	55	
12	Horden Colliery Welfare	36	13	10	13	53	57	−4	49	
13	Prudhoe Town	36	11	9	16	59	74	−15	39 (Note: Prudhoe Town were deducted three points.)	
14	Evenwood Town	36	11	6	19	57	100	−43	39	
15	Esh Winning	36	11	2	23	59	81	−22	35	
16	Kennek Ryhope CA	36	9	7	20	49	70	−21	34	
17	Whickham	36	6	7	23	27	70	−43	25	
18	Murton	36	1	4	31	21	133	−112	7	
19	Eppleton Colliery Welfare	36	0	3	33	22	156	−134	3	

Source: fchd
Rules for classification: 1) points; 2) goal difference; 3) number of goals scored.
