= 1986–87 Northern Football League =

The 1986–87 Northern Football League season was the 89th in the history of Northern Football League, a football competition in England.

== Division One ==
Northern Football League Division One
- Season: 1986–87
- Champions: Blyth Spartans
- Relegated: Bedlington Terriers; Peterlee Newtown
- Matches: 380
- Goals: 1,168 (3.07 per match)

Division One featured 18 clubs which competed in the division last season, along with two new clubs, promoted from Division Two:

- Blue Star, who also changed name to Newcastle Blue Star
- Easington Colliery

=== League table ===
Pos	Team	Pld	W	D	L	GF	GA	GD	Pts	Promotion or relegation
1	Blyth Spartans	38	29	7	2	87	36	+51	94	
2	Bishop Auckland	38	26	2	10	96	42	+54	80	
3	Spennymoor United	38	20	13	5	89	41	+48	73	
4	Newcastle Blue Star	38	20	11	7	74	34	+40	71	
5	Whitley Bay	38	19	9	10	74	53	+21	66	
6	North Shields	38	18	10	10	65	47	+18	64	
7	Gretna	38	17	10	11	73	57	+16	61	
8	South Bank	38	16	12	10	59	36	+23	60	
9	Tow Law Town	38	15	10	13	50	57	−7	55	
10	Easington Colliery	38	16	5	17	59	59	0	53	
11	Whitby Town	38	13	13	12	56	63	−7	52	
12	Brandon United	38	12	11	15	55	64	−9	47	
13	Consett	38	14	5	19	46	72	−26	47	
14	Ryhope Community	38	11	9	18	47	64	−17	42	
15	Hartlepool United reserves	38	10	10	18	41	59	−18	40	Resigned from the league
16	Chester-le-Street Town	38	7	14	17	37	66	−29	35	
17	Crook Town	38	9	5	24	47	85	−38	32	
18	Ferryhill Athletic	38	7	9	22	42	80	−38	30	
19	Peterlee Newtown	38	7	7	24	31	66	−35	28	Relegated to Division Two
20	Bedlington Terriers	38	6	4	28	40	87	−47	22	Relegated to Division Two

Source: fchd
Rules for classification: 1) points; 2) goal difference; 3) number of goals scored.

== Division Two ==
Northern Football League Division Two
- Season: 1986–87
- Champions: Billingham Synthonia
- Promoted: Billingham Synthonia; Guisborough Town; Shildon
- Matches: 342
- Goals: 1,119 (3.27 per match)

Division Two featured 17 clubs which competed in the division last season, along with two new clubs, relegated from Division One:

- Billingham Synthonia
- Billingham Town

=== League table ===
Pos	Team	Pld	W	D	L	GF	GA	GD	Pts	Promotion or relegation
1	Billingham Synthonia	36	26	9	1	83	34	+49	87	Promoted to Division One
2	Guisborough Town	36	24	7	5	87	33	+54	79	Promoted to Division One
3	Shildon	36	19	8	9	77	47	+30	65	Promoted to Division One
4	Billingham Town	36	17	9	10	70	43	+27	60	
5	West Auckland Town	36	15	13	8	56	46	+10	58	
6	Alnwick Town	36	15	11	10	45	30	+15	56	
7	Stockton	36	15	11	10	65	51	+14	56	
8	Norton & Stockton Ancients	36	16	6	14	64	47	+17	54	
9	Seaham Colliery Welfare	36	16	6	14	60	53	+7	54	
10	Ashington	36	14	6	16	67	73	−6	48	
11	Northallerton Town	36	13	6	17	61	74	−13	45	
12	Durham City	36	12	8	16	52	63	−11	44	
13	Willington	36	12	10	14	53	52	+1	43 (Note: Willington were deducted three points.)	
14	Shotton Comrades	36	8	16	12	52	64	−12	37 (Note: Shotton Comrades were deducted three points.)	
15	Evenwood Town	36	10	7	19	58	70	−12	37	
16	Darlington Cleveland Bridge	36	8	10	18	45	81	−36	34	
17	Esh Winning	36	8	7	21	44	81	−37	31	
18	Horden Colliery Welfare	36	8	6	22	39	79	−40	30	
19	Langley Park	36	5	6	25	41	98	−57	21	

Source: fchd
Rules for classification: 1) points; 2) goal difference; 3) number of goals scored.
