= 1983–84 Northern Football League =

The 1983–84 Northern Football League season was the 86th in the history of Northern Football League, a football competition in England.

== Division One ==
Northern Football League Division One
- Season: 1983–84
- Champions: Blyth Spartans
- Relegated: Ashington; Evenwood Town
- Matches: 306
- Goals: 991 (3.24 per match)

Division One featured 16 clubs which competed in the division last season, along with two new clubs, promoted from Division Two:

- Gretna
- Peterlee Newtown

=== League table ===
Pos	Team	Pld	W	D	L	GF	GA	GD	Pts	Promotion or relegation
1	Blyth Spartans	34	23	9	2	74	22	+52	78	
2	North Shields	34	21	6	7	81	51	+30	69	
3	Whitby Town	34	20	7	7	79	33	+46	67	
4	Tow Law Town	34	19	8	7	72	44	+28	65	
5	Bishop Auckland	34	19	7	8	80	39	+41	64	
6	South Bank	34	18	7	9	62	35	+27	61	
7	Billingham Synthonia	34	14	8	12	56	54	+2	50	
8	Gretna	34	15	7	12	65	58	+7	49 (Note: Gretna were deducted three points.)	
9	Whitley Bay	34	14	5	15	39	60	−21	47	
10	Horden Colliery Welfare	34	12	7	15	48	59	−11	43	
11	Spennymoor United	34	10	9	15	41	57	−16	39	
12	Consett	34	10	8	16	43	58	−15	38	
13	Peterlee Newtown	34	11	5	18	50	78	−28	38	
14	Crook Town	34	9	10	15	38	50	−12	37	
15	Shildon	34	10	6	18	50	66	−16	36	
16	Ferryhill Athletic	34	9	6	19	47	61	−14	33	
17	Ashington	34	7	8	19	39	71	−32	26 (Note: Ashington were deducted three points.)	Relegated to Division Two
18	Evenwood Town	34	1	5	28	27	95	−68	8	Relegated to Division Two

Source: fchd
Rules for classification: 1) points; 2) goal difference; 3) number of goals scored.

== Division Two ==
Northern Football League Division Two
- Season: 1983–84
- Champions: Chester-le-Street Town
- Promoted: Chester-le-Street Town; Ryhope Community
- Matches: 306
- Goals: 982 (3.21 per match)

Division Two featured nine clubs which competed in the division last season, along with nine new clubs.

- Clubs relegated from Division One:
  - Durham City
  - West Auckland Town
  - Willington
- Clubs joined from the Wearside Football League:
  - Brandon United
  - Chester-le-Street Town
  - Seaham Colliery Welware
- Clubs joined from the Northern Football Alliance:
  - Darlington Cleveland Bridge
  - Shotton Comrades
- Plus:
  - Langley Park

=== League table ===
Pos	Team	Pld	W	D	L	GF	GA	GD	Pts	Promotion or relegation
1	Chester-le-Street Town	34	25	7	2	84	21	+63	82	Promoted to Division One
2	Ryhope Community	34	23	6	5	66	33	+33	75	Promoted to Division One
3	Seaham Colliery Welfare	34	23	5	6	69	30	+39	74	
4	Brandon United	34	20	6	8	67	37	+30	66	
5	Durham City	34	16	11	7	61	38	+23	59	
6	Darlington Cleveland Bridge	34	15	9	10	60	52	+8	54	
7	Hartlepool United reserves	34	18	5	11	73	52	+21	53 (Note: Hartlepool United reserves were deducted three points.)	
8	Bedlington Terriers	34	14	7	13	52	41	+11	49	
9	Esh Winning	34	13	10	11	49	55	−6	49	
10	Billingham Town	34	13	6	15	63	51	+12	45	
11	Darlington reserves	34	12	4	18	47	69	−22	40	
12	Northallerton Town	34	12	6	16	48	52	−4	39 (Note: Northallerton Town were deducted three points.)	
13	Langley Park	34	9	8	17	46	76	−30	35	
14	Alnwick Town	34	7	12	15	49	53	−4	33	
15	Shotton Comrades	34	9	5	20	55	76	−21	32	
16	Norton & Stockton Ancients	34	6	10	18	30	55	−25	28	
17	West Auckland Town	34	7	3	24	36	83	−47	24	
18	Willington	34	2	4	28	27	108	−81	10	

Source: fchd
Rules for classification: 1) points; 2) goal difference; 3) number of goals scored.
