= 2000–01 FA Cup qualifying rounds =

Tournament details
- Country: England; Scotland; Wales

The 2000–01 FA Cup qualifying rounds opened the 120th season of competition in England for 'The Football Association Challenge Cup' (FA Cup), the world's oldest association football single knockout competition. A total of 602 clubs were accepted for the competition, up 23 from the previous season’s 579.

This season saw invites extended to some teams from Level 10 in the English football pyramid. With the larger number of clubs entering the tournament from non-League teams (Levels 5 through 10), a new extra preliminary round was added to the tournament. As a result, the competition started with six rounds of preliminary (2) and qualifying (4) knockouts for these non-League teams.

The 32 winning teams from fourth qualifying round progressed to the First round proper, where League teams tiered at Levels 3 and 4 entered the competition.

== Calendar ==
Round	Start date	Leagues entering at this round	New entries this round	Winners from previous round	Number of fixtures
Extra preliminary round	19 August 2000	Levels 8-10	34	none	17
Preliminary round	2 September 2000	Level 7	387	17	202
First qualifying round	16 September 2000	none	none	202	101
Second qualifying round	30 September 2000	Isthmian League; Northern Premier League; Southern Football League (Premier divisions)	67	101	84
Third qualifying round	14 October 2000	none	none	84	42
Fourth qualifying round	28 October 2000	Football Conference	22	42	32

== Extra preliminary round ==
Matches in the first extra preliminary round since 1950–51 were played on the weekend beginning Saturday 19 August 2000. 34 clubs from Levels 8-10 of English football, entered at this stage of the competition, while other clubs from those levels get a bye to the next round.

Tie	Home team (tier)	Score	Away team (tier)
1	Brigg Town (8)	3–0	Willington (9)
2	Eccleshill United (8)	2–3	Sheffield (8)
3	South Shields (9)	2–1	Garforth Town (8)
4	Tow Law Town (8)	2–0	St Helens Town (8)
5	Squires Gate (9)	1–2	West Auckland Town (8)
6	Guisborough Town (8)	1–1	Chadderton (9)
replay	Chadderton (9)	4–1	Guisborough Town (8)
7	Armthorpe Welfare (8)	0–1	Penrith (9)
8	Pelsall Villa (8)	1–1	Kidsgrove Athletic (8)
replay	Kidsgrove Athletic (8)	1–3	Pelsall Villa (8)

Tie	Home team (tier)	Score	Away team (tier)
9	Holbeach United (8)	1–0	Halesowen Harriers (8)
10	Royston Town (10)	0–5	Newmarket Town (8)
11	Haringey Borough (10)	4–1	Concord Rangers (10)
12	Raunds Town (8)	2–3	Soham Town Rangers (8)
13	Buckingham Town (8)	4–1	Halstead Town (8)
14	Lowestoft Town (8)	2–3	Fakenham Town (8)
15	Yate Town (8)	0–3	Brislington (8)
16	Melksham Town (8)	1–0	Falmouth Town (10)
17	Wimborne Town (8)	2–0	Bridport (8)

== Preliminary round ==
Matches were played on weekend of Saturday 2 September 2000. A total of 404 clubs took part in this stage of the competition, including the 17 winners from the extra preliminary round, 300 clubs from Levels 8-10, who get a bye in the extra preliminary round and 87 clubs entering at this stage from the four divisions at Level 7 of English football (all, except Vauxhall Motors). The round featured 40 clubs from Level 10 in the competition, being the lowest ranked clubs in this round.

Tie	Home team (tier)	Score	Away team (tier)
1	Louth United (9)	1–5	North Ferriby United (7)
2	Witton Albion (7)	4–3	Oldham Town (9)
3	Trafford (7)	1–0	Flixton (8)
4	Marske United (8)	3–1	South Shields (9)
5	Consett (8)	2–1	Hallam (8)
6	Yorkshire Amateur (9)	5–0	Parkgate (9)
7	Workington (7)	0–1	Farsley Celtic (7)
8	Bradford Park Avenue (7)	1–0	Brandon United (8)
9	Kennek Ryhope CA (9)	0–5	Salford City (8)
10	Whitley Bay (8)	2–1	Ashington (9)
11	Gretna (7)	0–0	Ramsbottom United (8)
replay	Ramsbottom United (8)	3–2	Gretna (7)
12	Glasshoughton Welfare (8)	0–2	West Auckland Town (8)
13	Billingham Synthonia (8)	1–1	Brigg Town (8)
replay	Brigg Town (8)	1–0	Billingham Synthonia (8)
14	Goole (8)	3–0	Jarrow Roofing BCA (8)
15	Castleton Gabriels (9)	2–3	Harrogate Railway Athletic (8)
16	Tow Law Town (8)	2–2	Newcastle Blue Star (8)
replay	Newcastle Blue Star (8)	2–1	Tow Law Town (8)
17	Chadderton (9)	2–3	Hebburn Town (8)
18	Prescot Cables (8)	0–2	Bedlington Terriers (8)
19	Maine Road (8)	2–2	Easington Colliery (8)
replay	Easington Colliery (8)	3–2	Maine Road (8)
20	Bacup Borough (9)	0–4	Harrogate Town (7)
21	Shotton Comrades (9)	1–2	Atherton Laburnum Rovers (9)
22	Clitheroe (8)	4–1	Shildon (9)
23	Mossley (8)	4–1	Hatfield Main (9)
24	Winsford United (7)	1–1	Selby Town (8)
replay	Selby Town (8)	2–0	Winsford United (7)
25	Durham City (8)	4–0	Thackley (8)
26	Skelmersdale United (8)	1–1	Guiseley (7)
replay	Guiseley (7)	3–0	Skelmersdale United (8)
27	Brodsworth Miners Welfare (8)	2–2	Blackpool Mechanics (9)
replay	Blackpool Mechanics (9)	3–2	Brodsworth Miners Welfare (8)
28	Horden Colliery Welfare (9)	3–0	Crook Town (8)
29	Darwen (9)	2–2	Penrith (9)
replay	Penrith (9)	0–1	Darwen (9)
30	Dunston Federation Brewery (8)	2–0	Curzon Ashton (8)
31	Great Harwood Town (8)	2–0	Northallerton Town (9)
32	Radcliffe Borough (7)	3–1	Rossington Main (9)
33	Denaby United (8)	0–1	Warrington Town (9)
34	Ossett Town (7)	0–1	Chorley (7)
35	Atherton Collieries (8)	2–0	Morpeth Town (8)
36	Evenwood Town (9)	1–2	Tadcaster Albion (9)
37	Woodley Sports (8)	0–3	Ashton United (7)
38	Sheffield (8)	2–1	Rossendale United (8)
39	Seaham Red Star (8)	3–1	Pontefract Collieries (9)
40	Peterlee Newtown (8)	4–4	Fleetwood Freeport (8)
replay	Fleetwood Freeport (8)	3–0	Peterlee Newtown (8)
41	Thornaby (9)	4–0	Esh Winning (9)
42	Abbey Hey (8)	1–2	Stocksbridge Park Steels (7)
43	Liversedge (8)	1–1	Chester-le-Street Town (8)
replay	Chester-le-Street Town (8)	0–3	Liversedge (8)
44	Billingham Town (8)	2–0	Ossett Albion (8)
45	Cheadle Town (8)	0–1	Bridlington Town (9)
46	Kendal Town (7)	3–1	Pickering Town (9)
47	Boston Town (8)	2–3	Leek CSOB (8)
48	Spalding United (7)	4–0	Glossop North End (8)
49	Bilston Town (7)	3–0	Sandwell Borough (8)
50	Staveley Miners Welfare (8)	1–2	Belper Town (7)
51	Gedling Town (9)	5–1	Boldmere St Michaels (8)
52	Oadby Town (8)	2–1	Willenhall Town (8)
53	Redditch United (7)	3–2	Arnold Town (8)
54	Newcastle Town (8)	2–0	Buxton (8)
55	Stamford (7)	2–0	Rushall Olympic (8)
56	Holbeach United (8)	2–1	Glapwell (8)
57	Atherstone United (7)	2–1	Pelsall Villa (8)
58	Bourne Town (8)	1–2	Shepshed Dynamo (7)
59	Corby Town (7)	1–0	Knypersley Victoria (8)
60	Cradley Town (8)	1–2	Paget Rangers (7)
61	Gresley Rovers (7)	1–1	Matlock Town (7)
replay	Matlock Town (7)	4–1	Gresley Rovers (7)
62	Racing Club Warwick (7)	1–2	Stourport Swifts (8)
63	West Midlands Police (8)	1–1	Bedworth United (7)
replay	Bedworth United (7)	2–0	West Midlands Police (8)
64	Eastwood Town (7)	3–1	Rocester (7)
65	Hinckley United (7)	7–0	Nantwich Town (8)
66	Stapenhill (8)	1–0	Bridgnorth Town (8)
67	Stratford Town (8)	1–1	Stafford Town (8)
replay	Stafford Town (8)	0–0 (5–4 p)	Stratford Town (8)
68	Blakenall (7)	0–1	Oldbury United (8)
69	Borrowash Victoria (9)	0–3	Grantham Town (7)
70	Barwell (8)	0–0	Lincoln United (7)
replay	Lincoln United (7)	2–4	Barwell (8)
71	Blackstones (8)	4–1	Shifnal Town (8)
72	Congleton Town (7)	0–0	Wednesfield (8)
replay	Wednesfield (8)	0–1	Congleton Town (7)
73	Solihull Borough (7)	2–1	Mickleover Sports (9)
74	Stourbridge (8)	0–0	Rugby United (7)
replay	Rugby United (7)	2–2 (5–6 p)	Stourbridge (8)
75	Chasetown (8)	0–1	Alfreton Town (8)
76	Sutton Coldfield Town (7)	1–1	Bromsgrove Rovers (7)
replay	Bromsgrove Rovers (7)	3–2	Sutton Coldfield Town (7)
77	Saffron Walden Town (10)	1–2	Histon (7)
78	Tiptree United (8)	6–2	Buckingham Town (8)
79	Flackwell Heath (9)	0–2	Bishop's Stortford (7)
80	Wroxham (8)	0–3	Ford United (7)
81	Felixstowe & Walton United (8)	2–3	Waltham Abbey (10)
82	Edgware Town (8)	2–2	Stowmarket Town (8)
replay	Stowmarket Town (8)	1–0	Edgware Town (8)
83	Chelmsford City (7)	4–1	Sawbridgeworth Town (10)
84	Northampton Spencer (8)	0–0	Southall (10)
replay	Southall (10)	0–2	Northampton Spencer (8)
85	Basildon United (10)	w/o	Yeading (7)
Walkover for Yeading – Basildon United removed
86	Boreham Wood (7)	3–0	Great Wakering Rovers (8)
87	Bugbrooke St Michaels (8)	0–3	Newmarket Town (8)
88	Potters Bar Town (10)	2–1	Leighton Town (8)
89	Cogenhoe United (8)	4–1	Desborough Town (8)
90	Bowers United (10)	1–1	Bedford United (10)
replay	Bedford United (10)	3–1	Bowers United (10)
91	Chalfont St Peter (9)	1–1	Harwich & Parkeston (8)
replay	Harwich & Parkeston (8)	1–1 (4–3 p)	Chalfont St Peter (9)
92	Ware (9)	3–2	Yaxley (8)
93	Romford (7)	1–6	Hemel Hempstead Town (8)
94	Wingate & Finchley (9)	2–1	Wivenhoe Town (8)
95	Woodbridge Town (8)	3–0	Marlow (8)
96	Baldock Town (7)	2–0	Ruislip Manor (10)
97	Uxbridge (7)	6–1	Holmer Green (10)
98	Barking (8)	2–1	Haringey Borough (10)
99	Wootton Blue Cross (8)	2–2	London Colney (10)
replay	London Colney (10)	2–2 (4–2 p)	Wootton Blue Cross (8)

Tie	Home team (tier)	Score	Away team (tier)
100	Ilford (10)	1–4	Mildenhall Town (8)
101	Wellingborough Town (8)	1–1	Tring Town (9)
replay	Tring Town (9)	2–1	Wellingborough Town (8)
102	Great Yarmouth Town (8)	4–1	Kempston Rovers (8)
103	Braintree Town (7)	6–0	Banbury United (7)
104	Witney Town (7)	0–3	Beaconsfield SYCOB (10)
105	Harlow Town (7)	2–3	Diss Town (8)
106	Burnham Ramblers (10)	1–0	Burnham (7)
107	Hanwell Town (10)	1–2	Stotfold (8)
108	Hullbridge Sports (10)	0–1	Welwyn Garden City (10)
109	Witham Town (9)	0–3	Bedford Town (7)
110	Southend Manor (10)	1–4	AFC Sudbury (8)
111	St Neots Town (8)	5–0	Milton Keynes City (10)
112	Tilbury (8)	1–0	Fakenham Town (8)
113	Rothwell Town (7)	0–2	Northwood (7)
114	Leyton Pennant (8)	2–2	East Thurrock United (8)
replay	East Thurrock United (8)	3–0	Leyton Pennant (8)
115	Eynesbury Rovers (8)	2–4	Stewart & Lloyds Corby (8)
116	Arlesey Town (9)	7–1	Aveley (9)
117	Brackley Town (8)	0–3	Wealdstone (7)
118	Long Buckby (8)	0–1	Clapton (9)
119	Ford Sports Daventry (8)	1–1	Hertford Town (9)
replay	Hertford Town (9)	2–3	Ford Sports Daventry (8)
120	Maldon Town (8)	3–3	Bury Town (8)
replay	Bury Town (8)	0–2	Maldon Town (8)
121	Berkhamsted Town (8)	4–1	Hornchurch (9)
122	Wembley (8)	1–1	Gorleston (8)
Walkover for Wembley - Gorleston disqualified for fielding ineligible player
123	Potton United (8)	0–2	Ely City (8)
124	Ipswich Wanderers (8)	3–1	Wisbech Town (7)
125	Brentwood (10)	2–4	Staines Town (7)
126	Brook House (10)	6–0	Kingsbury Town (9)
127	Cheshunt (8)	2–2	Clacton Town (8)
replay	Clacton Town (8)	2–3	Cheshunt (8)
128	AFC Wallingford (10)	2–1	Warboys Town (8)
129	Hoddesdon Town (10)	1–2	St Margaretsbury (10)
130	Barton Rovers (7)	0–2	Soham Town Rangers (8)
131	Moneyfields (8)	0–2	Epsom & Ewell (9)
132	Sandhurst Town (10)	0–4	Andover (8)
133	Chertsey Town (8)	3–1	Abingdon Town (9)
134	Thatcham Town (8)	2–0	Corinthian-Casuals (9)
135	Eastbourne Town (8)	2–2	Selsey (8)
replay	Selsey (8)	3–1	Eastbourne Town (8)
136	Camberley Town (9)	0–1	Saltdean United (8)
137	Bashley (7)	3–0	North Leigh (8)
138	Littlehampton Town (8)	2–0	Peacehaven & Telscombe (9)
139	Beckenham Town (8)	0–1	Aylesbury United (7)
140	Walton & Hersham (7)	3–1	Croydon Athletic (9)
141	Chichester City United (8)	2–2	Abingdon United (8)
replay	Abingdon United (8)	2–1	Chichester City United (8)
142	Lordswood (8)	1–3	Horsham (8)
143	Cowes Sports (8)	1–0	Cray Wanderers (8)
144	Burgess Hill Town (8)	4–1	Brockenhurst (8)
145	Banstead Athletic (8)	4–0	Farnham Town (10)
146	St Leonards (7)	1–1	Three Bridges (8)
replay	Three Bridges (8)	2–3	St Leonards (7)
147	Lewes (9)	3–0	Dorking (9)
148	Tooting & Mitcham United (8)	3–0	Worthing (7)
149	Southwick (9)	0–5	Langney Sports (7)
150	Viking Greenford (10)	1–4	Merstham (10)
151	Sittingbourne (7)	2–0	Godalming & Guildford (10)
152	Whitchurch United (8)	0–2	AFC Newbury (8)
153	Thamesmead Town (8)	1–2	Herne Bay (8)
154	Greenwich Borough (8)	1–0	Hythe United (8)
Walkover for Hythe Town - Greenwich Borough disqualified for fielding multiple ineligible players in the same match
155	Shoreham (9)	1–10	Oxford City (7)
156	Erith Town (8)	2–2	Hassocks (8)
replay	Hassocks (8)	3–1	Erith Town (8)
157	Ashford Town (Kent) (7)	4–1	Walton Casuals (10)
158	Wokingham Town (8)	0–3	Bedfont (10)
159	Dartford (7)	3–1	Deal Town (8)
160	Chipstead (10)	0–1	Ashford Town (Middx) (9)
161	Fareham Town (8)	1–1	Ringmer (8)
replay	Ringmer (8)	0–2	Fareham Town (8)
162	Gosport Borough (8)	1–1	Slade Green (8)
replay	Slade Green (8)	1–2	Gosport Borough (8)
163	Windsor & Eton (8)	1–0	Whitstable Town (8)
164	Portsmouth Royal Navy (8)	1–4	Ash United (10)
165	Reading Town (10)	2–0	Lancing (8)
166	Newport (Isle of Wight) (7)	5–2	Arundel (8)
167	Metropolitan Police (8)	2–1	Leatherhead (7)
168	Hungerford Town (8)	0–2	Bromley (7)
169	East Preston (8)	1–0	Redhill (8)
170	Tunbridge Wells (8)	1–2	VCD Athletic (8)
171	Carterton Town (8)	1–1	Thame United (7)
replay	Thame United (7)	0–0 (1–4 p)	Carterton Town (8)
172	Hillingdon Borough (10)	1–3	Bracknell Town (9)
173	Eastbourne United (8)	1–4	Egham Town (9)
174	Horsham YMCA (8)	2–0	Cobham (10)
175	Wick (8)	1–0	Erith & Belvedere (7)
176	Tonbridge Angels (7)	0–0	Eastleigh (8)
replay	Eastleigh (8)	0–1	Tonbridge Angels (7)
177	Lymington & New Milton (8)	2–1	Didcot Town (8)
178	Hailsham Town (9)	1–2	Whyteleafe (7)
179	Chatham Town (8)	3–1	Molesey (8)
180	Chessington & Hook United (10)	1–6	Hastings Town (7)
181	Bognor Regis Town (7)	2–3	Cove (10)
182	BAT Sports (8)	0–0	Sheppey United (8)
replay	Sheppey United (8)	2–2 (5–4 p)	BAT Sports (8)
183	Fleet Town (8)	1–0	Ramsgate (8)
184	Whitehawk (8)	0–3	AFC Totton (8)
185	Paulton Rovers (8)	4–0	Street (9)
186	Westbury United (8)	1–3	Bristol Manor Farm (8)
187	Downton (8)	4–0	Bournemouth (8)
188	Bemerton Heath Harlequins (8)	0–4	Tiverton Town (7)
189	Cinderford Town (7)	0–3	Bridgwater Town (8)
190	Devizes Town (8)	1–1	Melksham Town (8)
replay	Melksham Town (8)	0–1	Devizes Town (8)
191	Chippenham Town (8)	1–1	St Blazey (10)
replay	St Blazey (10)	0–3	Chippenham Town (8)
192	Tuffley Rovers (8)	4–1	Taunton Town (8)
193	Brislington (8)	3–2	Calne Town (9)
194	Weston-super-Mare (7)	2–1	Wimborne Town (8)
195	Welton Rovers (8)	1–1	Shortwood United (8)
replay	Shortwood United (8)	1–0	Welton Rovers (8)
196	Elmore (8)	3–4	Barnstaple Town (8)
197	Frome Town (9)	2–0	Bishop Sutton (8)
198	Evesham United (7)	3–1	Bideford (8)
199	Odd Down (8)	0–2	Gloucester City (7)
200	Cirencester Town (7)	1–0	Minehead Town (8)
201	Mangotsfield United (7)	4–2	Christchurch (8)
202	Backwell United (8)	5–2	Torrington (9)

== First qualifying round ==
Matches were played on weekend of 16 September 2000. A total of 202 clubs took part in this stage of the competition, all having progressed from the preliminary round. The round featured 15 clubs from Level 10 still in the competition, being the lowest ranked clubs in this round.

Tie	Home team (tier)	Score	Away team (tier)
1	Warrington Town (9)	0–2	Clitheroe (8)
2	Tadcaster Albion (9)	0–1	Horden Colliery Welfare (9)
3	Stocksbridge Park Steels (7)	1–0	Darwen (9)
4	Harrogate Railway Athletic (8)	1–5	Bedlington Terriers (8)
5	West Auckland Town (8)	3–1	Selby Town (8)
6	Guiseley (7)	0–1	Farsley Celtic (7)
7	Thornaby (9)	0–1	Marske United (8)
8	Seaham Red Star (8)	7–0	Great Harwood Town (8)
9	Easington Colliery (8)	2–1	Yorkshire Amateur (9)
10	Blackpool Mechanics (9)	0–1	Radcliffe Borough (7)
11	Goole (8)	2–1	Ramsbottom United (8)
12	Durham City (8)	3–1	Newcastle Blue Star (8)
13	Chorley (7)	3–2	Trafford (7)
14	North Ferriby United (7)	2–2	Ashton United (7)
replay	Ashton United (7)	4–3	North Ferriby United (7)
15	Witton Albion (7)	1–0	Atherton Collieries (8)
16	Mossley (8)	2–0	Hebburn Town (8)
17	Harrogate Town (7)	0–2	Billingham Town (8)
18	Dunston Federation Brewery (8)	1–2	Fleetwood Freeport (8)
19	Atherton Laburnum Rovers (9)	1–5	Sheffield (8)
20	Whitley Bay (8)	3–1	Consett (8)
21	Brigg Town (8)	5–1	Liversedge (8)
22	Bradford Park Avenue (7)	0–1	Salford City (8)
23	Bridlington Town (9)	3–1	Kendal Town (7)
24	Redditch United (7)	2–3	Belper Town (7)
25	Hinckley United (7)	3–0	Gedling Town (9)
26	Bromsgrove Rovers (7)	1–1	Oldbury United (8)
replay	Oldbury United (8)	2–0	Bromsgrove Rovers (7)
27	Bilston Town (7)	1–5	Solihull Borough (7)
28	Grantham Town (7)	3–1	Bedworth United (7)
29	Paget Rangers (7)	0–2	Stafford Town (8)
30	Atherstone United (7)	0–1	Stourport Swifts (8)
31	Stourbridge (8)	2–3	Stamford (7)
32	Leek CSOB (8)	1–1	Holbeach United (8)
replay	Holbeach United (8)	3–1	Leek CSOB (8)
33	Stapenhill (8)	1–1	Barwell (8)
replay	Barwell (8)	5–1	Stapenhill (8)
34	Shepshed Dynamo (7)	4–2	Oadby Town (8)
35	Newcastle Town (8)	2–0	Corby Town (7)
36	Congleton Town (7)	4–3	Eastwood Town (7)
37	Blackstones (8)	2–3	Matlock Town (7)
38	Alfreton Town (8)	3–2	Spalding United (7)
39	Cogenhoe United (8)	2–3	Maldon Town (8)
40	Northampton Spencer (8)	0–2	Mildenhall Town (8)
41	Waltham Abbey (10)	4–2	St Neots Town (8)
42	Wealdstone (7)	4–0	Ware (9)
43	Stewart & Lloyds Corby (8)	1–3	Baldock Town (7)
44	Ford United (7)	3–0	Welwyn Garden City (10)
45	Tilbury (8)	1–3	Chelmsford City (7)
46	Stotfold (8)	1–1	London Colney (10)
replay	London Colney (10)	2–3	Stotfold (8)
47	Uxbridge (7)	5–1	Potters Bar Town (10)
48	Braintree Town (7)	5–0	Clapton (9)
49	St Margaretsbury (10)	1–0	Boreham Wood (7)
50	Soham Town Rangers (8)	3–1	Ford Sports Daventry (8)
51	Ely City (8)	2–2	Tring Town (9)
replay	Tring Town (9)	3–2	Ely City (8)
52	Newmarket Town (8)	3–3	Wingate & Finchley (9)
replay	Wingate & Finchley (9)	4–1	Newmarket Town (8)
53	Yeading (7)	2–3	Beaconsfield SYCOB (10)
54	Arlesey Town (9)	1–2	Histon (7)

Tie	Home team (tier)	Score	Away team (tier)
55	Bedford Town (7)	3–1	Staines Town (7)
56	Woodbridge Town (8)	3–1	Burnham Ramblers (10)
57	AFC Sudbury (8)	5–1	Brook House (10)
58	Barking (8)	2–3	Berkhamsted Town (8)
59	Ipswich Wanderers (8)	1–0	Bedford United (10)
60	Hemel Hempstead Town (8)	3–0	Cheshunt (8)
61	Diss Town (8)	0–5	Bishop's Stortford (7)
62	East Thurrock United (8)	1–4	Northwood (7)
63	Tiptree United (8)	1–3	Stowmarket Town (8)
64	Harwich & Parkeston (8)	1–2	AFC Wallingford (10)
65	Wembley (8)	2–0	Great Yarmouth Town (8)
66	Cowes Sports (8)	1–1	Horsham YMCA (8)
replay	Horsham YMCA (8)	6–0	Cowes Sports (8)
67	Littlehampton Town (8)	1–1	Hythe United (8)
replay	Hythe United (8)	0–1	Littlehampton Town (8)
68	Selsey (8)	4–0	Reading Town (10)
69	Carterton Town (8)	3–1	St Leonards (7)
70	East Preston (8)	3–3	Merstham (10)
replay	Merstham (10)	3–1	East Preston (8)
71	Thatcham Town (8)	1–1	Gosport Borough (8)
replay	Gosport Borough (8)	1–1 (3–4 p)	Thatcham Town (8)
72	Newport (Isle of Wight) (7)	1–1	Bashley (7)
replay	Bashley (7)	0–2	Newport (Isle of Wight) (7)
73	Fareham Town (8)	0–0	Herne Bay (8)
replay	Herne Bay (8)	2–1	Fareham Town (8)
74	Sittingbourne (7)	0–3	Horsham (8)
75	Ashford Town (Kent) (7)	1–2	Bracknell Town (9)
76	Fleet Town (8)	3–1	Walton & Hersham (7)
77	AFC Totton (8)	0–0	Egham Town (9)
replay	Egham Town (9)	1–3	AFC Totton (8)
78	Lymington & New Milton (8)	0–1	Oxford City (7)
79	Abingdon United (8)	4–1	Tooting & Mitcham United (8)
80	Aylesbury United (7)	4–3	Bedfont (10)
81	VCD Athletic (8)	4–4	Epsom & Ewell (9)
replay	Epsom & Ewell (9)	2–0	VCD Athletic (8)
82	Windsor & Eton (8)	1–0	Chatham Town (8)
83	Langney Sports (7)	3–2	Ashford Town (Middx) (9)
84	Ash United (10)	2–4	Hastings Town (7)
85	AFC Newbury (8)	2–0	Wick (8)
86	Whyteleafe (7)	4–0	Burgess Hill Town (8)
87	Lewes (9)	2–2	Cove (10)
replay	Cove (10)	1–2	Lewes (9)
88	Dartford (7)	1–1	Chertsey Town (8)
replay	Chertsey Town (8)	0–2	Dartford (7)
89	Bromley (7)	1–2	Metropolitan Police (8)
90	Andover (8)	2–3	Saltdean United (8)
91	Banstead Athletic (8)	3–1	Sheppey United (8)
92	Tonbridge Angels (7)	3–0	Hassocks (8)
93	Weston-super-Mare (7)	0–0	Shortwood United (8)
replay	Shortwood United (8)	3–2	Weston-super-Mare (7)
94	Bridgwater Town (8)	2–1	Downton (8)
95	Tuffley Rovers (8)	0–1	Chippenham Town (8)
96	Backwell United (8)	1–2	Devizes Town (8)
97	Gloucester City (7)	2–1	Evesham United (7)
98	Barnstaple Town (8)	1–5	Cirencester Town (7)
99	Brislington (8)	2–3	Paulton Rovers (8)
100	Mangotsfield United (7)	4–2	Frome Town (9)
101	Tiverton Town (7)	X	Bristol Manor Farm (8)
Score was 1-0, but a replay was ordered due to a rule break
replay	Bristol Manor Farm (8)	1–4	Tiverton Town (7)

== Second qualifying round ==
Matches were played on weekend of 30 September 2000. A total of 168 clubs took part in this stage of the competition, including the 101 winners from the first qualifying round and 67 Level 6 clubs, from Premier divisions of the Isthmian League, Northern Premier League and Southern Football League, entering at this stage. AFC Wallingford and Merstham from the Combined Counties Football League and Beaconsfield SYCOB, St Margaretsbury and Waltham Abbey from the Spartan South Midlands Football League, which technically were the Level 10 leagues were the lowest ranked clubs in this round. Also, the round featured seven clubs from Level 9 still in the competition.

Tie	Home team (tier)	Score	Away team (tier)
1	Emley (6)	3–1	Salford City (8)
2	Gateshead (6)	2–1	Bishop Auckland (6)
3	Stalybridge Celtic (6)	2–0	Blyth Spartans (6)
4	Witton Albion (7)	1–1	Fleetwood Freeport (8)
replay	Fleetwood Freeport (8)	1–2	Witton Albion (7)
5	Durham City (8)	2–2	Accrington Stanley (6)
replay	Accrington Stanley (6)	4–2	Durham City (8)
6	Bamber Bridge (6)	1–1	Marske United (8)
replay	Marske United (8)	0–2	Bamber Bridge (6)
7	Spennymoor United (6)	0–3	Bedlington Terriers (8)
8	Marine (6)	4–3	Colwyn Bay (6)
9	Sheffield (8)	2–1	Farsley Celtic (7)
10	Barrow (6)	3–0	Droylsden (6)
11	Ashton United (7)	1–1	Goole (8)
replay	Goole (8)	2–3	Ashton United (7)
12	Altrincham (6)	0–3	Mossley (8)
13	Frickley Athletic (6)	1–0	Stocksbridge Park Steels (7)
14	Clitheroe (8)	1–2	Hyde United (6)
15	Horden Colliery Welfare (9)	1–3	Gainsborough Trinity (6)
16	Bridlington Town (9)	1–1	Billingham Town (8)
replay	Billingham Town (8)	3–1	Bridlington Town (9)
17	Whitley Bay (8)	2–1	Worksop Town (6)
18	Burscough (6)	2–1	Runcorn (6)
19	Brigg Town (8)	2–2	Lancaster City (6)
replay	Lancaster City (6)	3–4	Brigg Town (8)
20	Radcliffe Borough (7)	4–1	West Auckland Town (8)
21	Chorley (7)	0–2	Whitby Town (6)
22	Seaham Red Star (8)	0–3	Easington Colliery (8)
23	Alfreton Town (8)	1–1	Hinckley United (7)
replay	Hinckley United (7)	2–1	Alfreton Town (8)
24	Holbeach United (8)	1–3	Belper Town (7)
25	Oldbury United (8)	2–3	Stourport Swifts (8)
26	Stamford (7)	1–1	Tamworth (6)
replay	Tamworth (6)	1–1 (3–2 p)	Stamford (7)
27	Stafford Town (8)	2–1	Moor Green (6)
28	Shepshed Dynamo (7)	0–3	Ilkeston Town (6)
29	Hucknall Town (6)	4–0	Congleton Town (7)
30	Barwell (8)	0–3	Grantham Town (7)
31	Matlock Town (7)	1–2	King's Lynn (6)
32	Solihull Borough (7)	1–1	Stafford Rangers (6)
replay	Stafford Rangers (6)	0–0 (4–3 p)	Solihull Borough (7)
33	Halesowen Town (6)	0–2	Burton Albion (6)
34	Newcastle Town (8)	1–1	Leek Town (6)
replay	Leek Town (6)	3–2	Newcastle Town (8)
35	Histon (7)	1–2	Bishop's Stortford (7)
36	Hendon (6)	3–2	St Margaretsbury (10)
37	Ford United (7)	3–1	Soham Town Rangers (8)
38	Heybridge Swifts (6)	1–1	AFC Sudbury (8)
replay	AFC Sudbury (8)	3–2	Heybridge Swifts (6)
39	Chesham United (6)	3–2	AFC Wallingford (10)
40	Hitchin Town (6)	1–1	Maidenhead United (6)
replay	Maidenhead United (6)	1–1 (7–6 p)	Hitchin Town (6)
41	Cambridge City (6)	3–0	Stotfold (8)

Tie	Home team (tier)	Score	Away team (tier)
42	Chelmsford City (7)	1–1	Grays Athletic (6)
replay	Grays Athletic (6)	2–1	Chelmsford City (7)
43	Purfleet (6)	3–1	Ipswich Wanderers (8)
44	Canvey Island (6)	1–1	Braintree Town (7)
replay	Braintree Town (7)	2–3	Canvey Island (6)
45	Hemel Hempstead Town (8)	3–4	Northwood (7)
46	Mildenhall Town (8)	3–0	Beaconsfield SYCOB (10)
47	Harrow Borough (6)	3–0	Tring Town (9)
48	Stowmarket Town (8)	1–2	Wealdstone (7)
49	Woodbridge Town (8)	0–0	Wembley (8)
replay	Wembley (8)	1–4	Woodbridge Town (8)
50	Baldock Town (7)	0–0	St Albans City (6)
replay	St Albans City (6)	1–2	Baldock Town (7)
51	Uxbridge (7)	3–2	Berkhamsted Town (8)
52	Waltham Abbey (10)	1–3	Maldon Town (8)
53	Billericay Town (6)	5–1	Wingate & Finchley (9)
54	Bedford Town (7)	0–0	Enfield (6)
replay	Enfield (6)	1–1 (4–3 p)	Bedford Town (7)
55	Farnborough Town (6)	3–3	Oxford City (7)
replay	Oxford City (7)	1–2	Farnborough Town (6)
56	Fisher Athletic (6)	4–2	Newport (Isle of Wight) (7)
57	Dartford (7)	3–2	Abingdon United (8)
58	Windsor & Eton (8)	0–3	Hampton & Richmond Borough (6)
59	Carshalton Athletic (6)	1–1	Croydon (6)
replay	Croydon (6)	2–2 (5–3 p)	Carshalton Athletic (6)
60	Margate (6)	0–1	Banstead Athletic (8)
61	Herne Bay (8)	0–5	Aylesbury United (7)
62	Carterton Town (8)	1–4	Havant & Waterlooville (6)
63	Saltdean United (8)	4–2	AFC Totton (8)
64	Tonbridge Angels (7)	2–0	Slough Town (6)
65	Crawley Town (6)	1–2	Aldershot Town (6)
66	Gravesend & Northfleet (6)	4–0	AFC Newbury (8)
67	Lewes (9)	2–0	Langney Sports (7)
68	Fleet Town (8)	1–2	Thatcham Town (8)
69	Whyteleafe (7)	2–1	Horsham YMCA (8)
70	Metropolitan Police (8)	1–4	Welling United (6)
71	Horsham (8)	5–1	Epsom & Ewell (9)
72	Folkestone Invicta (6)	1–1	Hastings Town (7)
replay	Hastings Town (7)	2–0	Folkestone Invicta (6)
73	Bracknell Town (9)	3–1	Merstham (10)
74	Littlehampton Town (8)	0–5	Sutton United (6)
75	Selsey (8)	1–2	Dulwich Hamlet (6)
76	Basingstoke Town (6)	1–1	Bath City (6)
replay	Bath City (6)	2–0	Basingstoke Town (6)
77	Gloucester City (7)	1–1	Chippenham Town (8)
replay	Chippenham Town (8)	3–5	Gloucester City (7)
78	Mangotsfield United (7)	4–2	Paulton Rovers (8)
79	Worcester City (6)	2–1	Cirencester Town (7)
80	Newport County (6)	0–4	Merthyr Tydfil (6)
81	Clevedon Town (6)	2–4	Salisbury City (6)
82	Tiverton Town (7)	2–0	Shortwood United (8)
83	Weymouth (6)	0–1	Dorchester Town (6)
84	Devizes Town (8)	2–1	Bridgwater Town (8)

== Third qualifying round ==
Matches were played on weekend of 14 October 2000. A total of 84 clubs took part, all having progressed from the second qualifying round. Bracknell Town and Lewes at Level 9 of English football were the lowest-ranked clubs to qualify for this round of the competition.

Tie	Home team (tier)	Score	Away team (tier)
1	Sheffield (8)	3–0	Ashton United (7)
2	Marine (6)	0–2	Radcliffe Borough (7)
3	Mossley (8)	1–1	Frickley Athletic (6)
replay	Frickley Athletic (6)	3–0	Mossley (8)
4	Stalybridge Celtic (6)	1–1	Billingham Town (8)
replay	Billingham Town (8)	3–0	Stalybridge Celtic (6)
5	Hyde United (6)	2–1	Brigg Town (8)
6	Witton Albion (7)	0–0	Burscough (6)
replay	Burscough (6)	6–1	Witton Albion (7)
7	Bamber Bridge (6)	1–1	Gateshead (6)
replay	Gateshead (6)	4–1	Bamber Bridge (6)
8	Emley (6)	1–2	Barrow (6)
9	Bedlington Terriers (8)	5–2	Accrington Stanley (6)
10	Easington Colliery (8)	1–0	Whitby Town (6)
11	Gainsborough Trinity (6)	0–0	Whitley Bay (8)
replay	Whitley Bay (8)	2–0	Gainsborough Trinity (6)
12	AFC Sudbury (8)	1–1	Leek Town (6)
replay	Leek Town (6)	1–2	AFC Sudbury (8)
13	Harrow Borough (6)	0–0	Stafford Town (8)
replay	Stafford Town (8)	1–3	Harrow Borough (6)
14	Mildenhall Town (8)	0–2	Grays Athletic (6)
15	Purfleet (6)	2–2	Grantham Town (7)
replay	Grantham Town (7)	1–0	Purfleet (6)
16	Bishop's Stortford (7)	1–2	Billericay Town (6)
17	Enfield (6)	3–1	Stourport Swifts (8)
18	Stafford Rangers (6)	0–2	Chesham United (6)

Tie	Home team (tier)	Score	Away team (tier)
19	Wealdstone (7)	2–3	Belper Town (7)
20	Hendon (6)	2–1	Ford United (7)
21	Canvey Island (6)	2–1	King's Lynn (6)
22	Tamworth (6)	1–1	Burton Albion (6)
replay	Burton Albion (6)	3–1	Tamworth (6)
23	Ilkeston Town (6)	3–0	Baldock Town (7)
24	Northwood (7)	5–1	Uxbridge (7)
25	Cambridge City (6)	3–2	Maldon Town (8)
26	Hucknall Town (6)	3–2	Maidenhead United (6)
27	Woodbridge Town (8)	0–2	Hinckley United (7)
28	Bracknell Town (9)	1–0	Banstead Athletic (8)
29	Welling United (6)	1–0	Tonbridge Angels (7)
30	Hastings Town (7)	2–3	Horsham (8)
31	Saltdean United (8)	1–2	Devizes Town (8)
32	Bath City (6)	3–0	Sutton United (6)
33	Tiverton Town (7)	1–3	Gloucester City (7)
34	Dartford (7)	0–3	Havant & Waterlooville (6)
35	Fisher Athletic (6)	1–2	Aldershot Town (6)
36	Merthyr Tydfil (6)	0–3	Hampton & Richmond Borough (6)
37	Farnborough Town (6)	0–2	Aylesbury United (7)
38	Worcester City (6)	3–1	Thatcham Town (8)
39	Gravesend & Northfleet (6)	4–1	Croydon (6)
40	Dulwich Hamlet (6)	1–1	Lewes (9)
replay	Lewes (9)	0–0 (1–3 p)	Dulwich Hamlet (6)
41	Dorchester Town (6)	4–3	Salisbury City (6)
42	Whyteleafe (7)	1–3	Mangotsfield United (7)

== Fourth qualifying round ==
Matches were played on weekend of Saturday 28 October 2000. A total of 64 clubs took part, 42 having progressed from the third qualifying round and 22 clubs from Football Conference, forming Level 5 of English football, entering at this stage. The round featured Bracknell Town from Level 9 still in the competition, being the lowest ranked club in this round.

Tie	Home team (tier)	Score	Away team (tier)
1	Gateshead (6)	4–2	Billingham Town (8)
2	Easington Colliery (8)	0–2	Chester City (5)
3	Barrow (6)	6–1	Whitley Bay (8)
4	Burscough (6)	1–1	Radcliffe Borough (7)
replay	Radcliffe Borough (7)	2–1	Burscough (6)
5	Sheffield (8)	1–5	Northwich Victoria (5)
6	Bedlington Terriers (8)	1–3	Morecambe (5)
7	Scarborough (5)	3–4	Leigh RMI (5)
8	Doncaster Rovers (5)	2–2	Southport (5)
replay	Southport (5)	1–0	Doncaster Rovers (5)
9	Frickley Athletic (6)	1–0	Hyde United (6)
10	Boston United (5)	1–1	Burton Albion (6)
replay	Burton Albion (6)	3–2	Boston United (5)
11	Hinckley United (7)	1–1	Telford United (5)
replay	Telford United (5)	4–1	Hinckley United (7)
12	Nuneaton Borough (5)	1–1	Stevenage Borough (5)
replay	Stevenage Borough (5)	1–2	Nuneaton Borough (5)
13	Hucknall Town (6)	0–1	Ilkeston Town (6)
14	Harrow Borough (6)	2–1	Enfield (6)
15	Hendon (6)	1–3	Dagenham & Redbridge (5)
16	Rushden & Diamonds (5)	5–4	Grantham Town (7)

Tie	Home team (tier)	Score	Away team (tier)
17	Cambridge City (6)	0–2	Canvey Island (6)
18	Belper Town (7)	2–3	AFC Sudbury (8)
19	Billericay Town (6)	0–0	Hednesford Town (5)
replay	Hednesford Town (5)	2–1	Billericay Town (6)
20	Northwood (7)	1–1	Grays Athletic (6)
replay	Grays Athletic (6)	1–0	Northwood (7)
21	Chesham United (6)	0–2	Kettering Town (5)
22	Forest Green Rovers (5)	3–1	Bath City (6)
23	Havant & Waterlooville (6)	1–1	Gloucester City (7)
replay	Gloucester City (7)	2–3	Havant & Waterlooville (6)
24	Aylesbury United (7)	0–1	Bracknell Town (9)
25	Gravesend & Northfleet (6)	4–0	Mangotsfield United (7)
26	Dorchester Town (6)	1–1	Welling United (6)
replay	Welling United (6)	2–4	Dorchester Town (6)
27	Yeovil Town (5)	1–1	Horsham (8)
replay	Horsham (8)	0–2	Yeovil Town (5)
28	Hayes (5)	4–2	Dulwich Hamlet (6)
29	Aldershot Town (6)	1–0	Dover Athletic (5)
30	Kingstonian (5)	5–2	Devizes Town (8)
31	Hampton & Richmond Borough (6)	5–0	Worcester City (6)
32	Woking (5)	1–0	Hereford United (5)

== 2000–01 FA Cup ==
See 2000–01 FA Cup for details of the rounds from the first round proper onwards.
