= 2000–01 Northern Football League =

The 2000–01 Northern Football League season was the 103rd in the history of Northern Football League, a football competition in England.

== Division One ==
Northern Football League Division One
- Season: 2000–01
- Champions: Bedlington Terriers
- Relegated: Easington Colliery; Hebburn Town; Crook Town
- Matches: 420
- Goals: 1,456 (3.47 per match)

Division One featured 17 clubs which competed in the division last season, along with four new clubs.

- Clubs promoted from Division Two:
  - Brandon United
  - Hebburn, who also changed name to Hebburn Town
  - Newcastle Blue Star
- Plus:
  - Whitley Bay, relegated from the Northern Premier League

=== League table ===
Pos	Team	Pld	W	D	L	GF	GA	GD	Pts	Promotion or relegation
1	Bedlington Terriers	40	28	5	7	108	31	+77	89	
2	Dunston Federation Brewery	40	26	7	7	93	49	+44	85	
3	Marske United	40	24	7	9	82	35	+47	79	
4	Durham City	40	24	6	10	95	42	+53	78	
5	Brandon United	40	23	8	9	86	53	+33	77	
6	Peterlee Newtown	40	22	9	9	75	55	+20	75	
7	Tow Law Town	40	20	7	13	90	64	+26	67	
8	Billingham Synthonia	40	18	11	11	81	58	+23	65	
9	Billingham Town	40	19	7	14	74	59	+15	64	
10	Consett	40	17	8	15	63	60	+3	59	
11	Whitley Bay	40	15	10	15	69	61	+8	55	
12	West Auckland Town	40	16	7	17	65	68	−3	55	
13	Jarrow Roofing BCA	40	12	12	16	63	71	−8	48	
14	Guisborough Town	40	13	8	19	53	60	−7	47	
15	Chester-le-Street Town	40	13	5	22	61	64	−3	44	
16	Newcastle Blue Star	40	12	8	20	53	83	−30	44	
17	Seaham Red Star	40	14	2	24	59	111	−52	44	
18	Morpeth Town	40	12	6	22	63	78	−15	36 (Note: Morpeth Town were deducted six points.)	
19	Easington Colliery	40	10	6	24	57	86	−29	36	Relegated to Division Two
20	Hebburn Town	40	5	7	28	33	113	−80	22	Relegated to Division Two
21	Crook Town	40	2	4	34	33	155	−122	10	Relegated to Division Two

Source: fchd
Rules for classification: 1) points; 2) goal difference; 3) number of goals scored.

== Division Two ==
Northern Football League Division Two
- Season: 2000–01
- Champions: Ashington
- Promoted: Ashington; Washington Ikeda Hoover; Thornaby
- Matches: 342
- Goals: 1,143 (3.34 per match)

Division Two featured 16 clubs which competed in the division last season, along with three new clubs, relegated from Division One:

- Shotton Comrades
- South Shields
- Thornaby-On-Tees, who also changed name to Thornaby

=== League table ===
Pos	Team	Pld	W	D	L	GF	GA	GD	Pts	Promotion or relegation
1	Ashington	36	25	5	6	100	41	+59	80	Promoted to Division One
2	Washington Ikeda Hoover	36	23	10	3	83	35	+48	79	Promoted to Division One
3	Thornaby	36	23	7	6	85	50	+35	76	Promoted to Division One
4	Horden Colliery Welfare	36	20	7	9	53	35	+18	67	
5	Esh Winning	36	19	7	10	79	44	+35	64	
6	Northallerton Town	36	16	12	8	75	45	+30	60	
7	Penrith	36	14	12	10	60	52	+8	54	
8	Norton & Stockton Ancients	36	16	9	11	51	51	0	54 (Note: Norton & Stockton Ancients were deducted three points.)	
9	Willington	36	12	12	12	52	46	+6	48	
10	Kennek Ryhope CA	36	12	10	14	46	53	−7	46	
11	South Shields	36	12	9	15	71	81	−10	45	
12	Prudhoe Town	36	13	5	18	69	66	+3	44	
13	Shildon	36	12	8	16	42	58	−16	44	
14	Alnwick Town	36	9	12	15	53	61	−8	39	
15	Evenwood Town	36	10	5	21	50	97	−47	35	
16	Shotton Comrades	36	8	10	18	49	85	−36	34	
17	Murton	36	9	8	19	53	76	−23	32 (Note: Murton were deducted three points.)	
18	Whickham	36	6	11	19	43	68	−25	29	
19	Eppleton Colliery Welfare	36	1	5	30	29	99	−70	8	

Source: fchd
Rules for classification: 1) points; 2) goal difference; 3) number of goals scored.
