= 1982–83 Northern Football League =

The 1982–83 Northern Football League season was the 85th in the history of Northern Football League, a football competition in England. The Northern League expanded to two divisions this season for the first time since 1899–1900.

== Division One ==
Northern Football League Division One
- Season: 1982–83
- Champions: Blyth Spartans
- Relegated: Durham City; West Auckland Town; Willington
- Matches: 342
- Goals: 1,091 (3.19 per match)

Division One featured 19 clubs which competed in the league last season, no new clubs joined the division this season.

=== League table ===
Pos	Team	Pld	W	D	L	GF	GA	GD	Pts	Promotion or relegation
1	Blyth Spartans	36	23	11	2	92	31	+61	80	
2	Whitby Town	36	23	9	4	80	34	+46	78	
3	Horden Colliery Welfare	36	21	5	10	65	35	+30	68	
4	Bishop Auckland	36	17	13	6	69	34	+35	64	
5	Spennymoor United	36	17	10	9	70	53	+17	61	
6	Billingham Synthonia	36	16	12	8	71	43	+28	60	
7	North Shields	36	17	7	12	73	46	+27	58	
8	Tow Law Town	36	16	10	10	71	63	+8	58	
9	Consett	36	15	10	11	53	37	+16	55	
10	Crook Town	36	16	7	13	54	47	+7	55	
11	South Bank	36	14	12	10	56	32	+24	54	
12	Ferryhill Athletic	36	14	12	10	53	42	+11	54	
13	Whitley Bay	36	13	8	15	56	50	+6	47	
14	Shildon	36	9	11	16	48	71	−23	38	
15	Evenwood Town	36	9	8	19	49	67	−18	35	
16	Ashington	36	9	6	21	36	73	−37	33	
17	Durham City	36	4	8	24	32	83	−51	20	Relegated to Division Two
18	West Auckland Town	36	5	3	28	37	110	−73	18	Relegated to Division Two
19	Willington	36	2	2	32	26	140	−114	8	Relegated to Division Two

Source: fchd
Rules for classification: 1) points; 2) goal difference; 3) number of goals scored.

== Division Two ==
Northern Football League Division Two
- Season: 1982–83
- Champions: Peterlee Newtown
- Promoted: Peterlee Newtown; Gretna
- Matches: 165
- Goals: 533 (3.23 per match)

This was the first season since 1899–1900 the league ran with a Division Two. The Division was formed by eleven clubs.

- Clubs joined from the Northern Football Alliance:
  - Alnwick Town
  - Bedlington Terriers
  - Esh Winning
  - Ryhope Community
- Clubs joined from the Wearside Football League:
  - Hartlepool United reserves
  - Peterlee Newtown
- Plus:
  - Billingham Town, joined from the Teesside Football League
  - Darlington reserves
  - Gretna, joined from the Carlisle and District League
  - Northallerton Town, joined from the Harrogate and District Football League
  - Norton & Stockton Ancients

=== League table ===
Pos	Team	Pld	W	D	L	GF	GA	GD	Pts	Promotion or relegation
1	Peterlee Newtown	30	18	9	3	67	33	+34	63	Promoted to Division One
2	Gretna	30	18	6	6	63	29	+34	60	Promoted to Division One
3	Darlington reserves	30	15	7	8	55	36	+19	52	
4	Hartlepool reserves	30	16	4	10	69	46	+23	46 (Note: Hartlepool United reserves were deducted three points.)	
5	Ryhope Community	30	14	6	10	61	55	+6	45 (Note: Ryhope Community were deducted three points.)	
6	Esh Winning	30	10	7	13	42	60	−18	37	
7	Billingham Town	30	8	11	11	36	47	−11	35	
8	Northallerton Town	30	10	4	16	41	61	−20	34	
9	Norton & Stockton Ancients	30	7	6	17	35	61	−26	27	
10	Bedlington Terriers	30	5	9	16	33	48	−15	24	
11	Alnwick Town	30	5	9	16	31	57	−26	24	

Source: fchd
Rules for classification: 1) points; 2) goal difference; 3) number of goals scored.
