= 1987–88 Northern Football League =

The 1987–88 Northern Football League season was the 90th in the history of Northern Football League, a football competition in England.

== Division One ==
Northern Football League Division One
- Season: 1987–88
- Champions: Blyth Spartans
- Promoted: Whitley Bay; Bishop Auckland
- Relegated: Ryhope Community; Consett
- Matches: 380
- Goals: 1,213 (3.19 per match)

Division One featured 17 clubs which competed in the division last season, along with three new clubs, promoted from Division Two:

- Billingham Synthonia
- Guisborough Town
- Shildon

=== League table ===
Pos	Team	Pld	W	D	L	GF	GA	GD	Pts	Promotion or relegation
1	Blyth Spartans	38	28	8	2	106	36	+70	92	
2	Newcastle Blue Star	38	28	3	7	79	33	+46	87	
3	Billingham Synthonia	38	23	8	7	76	41	+35	77	
4	Whitley Bay	38	22	9	7	60	27	+33	75	Promoted to the Northern Premier League Division One
5	Guisborough Town	38	18	12	8	63	41	+22	66	
6	Bishop Auckland	38	19	7	12	70	48	+22	64	Promoted to the Northern Premier League Division One
7	Gretna	38	17	6	15	69	46	+23	57	
8	Tow Law Town	38	16	6	16	65	72	−7	54	
9	North Shields	38	16	5	17	62	59	+3	53	
10	Brandon United	38	15	7	16	64	61	+3	52	
11	Spennymoor United	38	15	7	16	57	57	0	52	
12	Shildon	38	14	7	17	61	59	+2	49	
13	Whitby Town	38	12	10	16	57	74	−17	46	
14	Ferryhill Athletic	38	12	7	19	58	75	−17	43	
15	Easington Colliery	38	12	6	20	65	85	−20	42	
16	South Bank	38	10	11	17	34	48	−14	41	
17	Crook Town	38	8	9	21	45	84	−39	33	
18	Chester-le-Street Town	38	7	9	22	38	73	−35	30	
19	Ryhope Community	38	5	10	23	40	89	−49	25	Relegated to Division Two
20	Consett	38	5	9	24	44	105	−61	24	Relegated to Division Two

Source: fchd
Rules for classification: 1) points; 2) goal difference; 3) number of goals scored.

== Division Two ==
Northern Football League Division Two
- Season: 1987–88
- Champions: Stockton
- Promoted: Stockton; Seaham Red Star; Durham City; Billingham Town
- Matches: 306
- Goals: 895 (2.92 per match)

Division Two featured 16 clubs which competed in the division last season, along with two new clubs, relegated from Division One:

- Bedlington Terriers
- Peterlee Newtown

Also, Seaham Colliery Welware changed name to Seaham Red Star.

=== League table ===
Pos	Team	Pld	W	D	L	GF	GA	GD	Pts	Promotion or relegation
1	Stockton	34	21	10	3	78	31	+47	73	Promoted to Division One
2	Seaham Red Star	34	21	8	5	63	32	+31	71	Promoted to Division One
3	Durham City	34	19	6	9	55	37	+18	63	Promoted to Division One
4	Billingham Town	34	14	13	7	60	43	+17	55	Promoted to Division One
5	Esh Winning	34	14	7	13	47	49	−2	49	
6	Alnwick Town	34	12	9	13	53	47	+6	45	
7	Bedlington Terriers	34	11	11	12	49	46	+3	44	
8	Peterlee Newtown	34	11	11	12	37	34	+3	44	
9	Northallerton Town	34	13	5	16	49	49	0	44	
10	Norton & Stockton Ancients	34	11	10	13	49	58	−9	43	
11	Horden Colliery Welfare	34	10	13	11	48	65	−17	43	
12	Langley Park	34	11	9	14	52	57	−5	42	
13	Willington	34	11	7	16	44	53	−9	40	
14	Darlington Cleveland Bridge	34	11	7	16	45	57	−12	40	
15	Ashington	34	10	9	15	45	62	−17	39	
16	Evenwood Town	34	10	8	16	42	56	−14	38	
17	West Auckland Town	34	9	8	17	46	62	−16	35	
18	Shotton Comrades	34	7	9	18	33	57	−24	30	

Source: fchd
Rules for classification: 1) points; 2) goal difference; 3) number of goals scored.
