= 2003–04 FA Cup qualifying rounds =

Tournament details
- Country: England; Wales

The 2003–04 FA Cup qualifying rounds opened the 123rd season of competition in England for 'The Football Association Challenge Cup' (FA Cup), the world's oldest association football single knockout competition. A total of 644 clubs were accepted for the competition, up 20 from the previous season’s 624.

The large number of clubs entering the tournament from lower down (Levels 5 through 10) in the English football pyramid meant that the competition started with six rounds of preliminary (2) and qualifying (4) knockouts for these non-League teams. South Western Football League was the only level 10 league represented in the Cup, four clubs from the South Western Football League were the lowest-ranked clubs in competition. The 32 winning teams from Fourth qualifying round progressed to the First round proper, where League teams tiered at Levels 3 and 4 entered the competition.

== Calendar ==
Round	Start date	Leagues entering at this round	New entries this round	Winners from previous round	Number of fixtures	Prize money
Extra preliminary round	23 August 2003	Levels 8-10	130	none	65	£500
Preliminary round	30 August 2003	Level 7	331	65	198	£1,000
First qualifying round	20 September 2003	none	none	198	99	£2,250
Second qualifying round	27 September 2003	Isthmian League; Northern Premier League; Southern Football League (Premier divisions)	69	99	84	£3,750
Third qualifying round	11 October 2003	none	none	84	42	£5,000
Fourth qualifying round	25 October 2003	Football Conference	22	42	32	£10,000

== Extra preliminary round ==
Matches played on Saturday/Sunday 23 to 24 August 2003. 130 clubs from Level 8, Level 9 and Level 10 of English football, entered at this stage of the competition, while other 217 clubs from levels 8-10 get a bye to the preliminary round.

Tie	Home team (tier)	Score	Away team (tier)	Att.
1	Skelmersdale United (8)	7–2	Glasshoughton Welfare (8)	71
2	Brodsworth Miners Welfare (8)	0–1	Pickering Town (8)	90
3	St Helens Town (8)	0–2	Trafford (8)	182
4	Garforth Town (9)	0–3	Whickham (9)	87
5	Holker Old Boys (9)	1–0	Penrith (8)	
6	Colne (9)	2–3	Mossley (8)	100
7	Norton & Stockton Ancients (9)	0–2	Evenwood Town (9)	117
8	Ossett Albion (8)	5–2	Alnwick Town (9)	94
9	Washington Nissan (9)	1–2	Jarrow Roofing BCA (8)	54
10	Shotton Comrades (9)	1–4	Newcastle Blue Star (9)	35
11	Dunston Federation Brewery (8)	1–0	Abbey Hey (8)	121
12	Eccleshill United (8)	1–2	Warrington Town (8)	49
13	Oldham Town (9)	3–2	Northallerton Town (9)	73
14	Fleetwood Town (8)	1–0	Darwen (9)	103
15	Blackstones (8)	1–4	Gedling Town (9)	78
16	Holbeach United (8)	1–1	Staveley Miners Welfare (9)	
replay	Staveley Miners Welfare (9)	3–2	Holbeach United (8)	
17	Carlton Town (9)	0–3	Shirebrook Town (9)	87
18	Lincoln Moorlands (9)	1–0	Arnold Town (8)	65
19	Nantwich Town (8)	1–2	Stratford Town (8)	80
20	Cradley Town (8)	2–0	Daventry Town (8)	65
21	Maldon Town (8)	4–1	Holmer Green (8)	
22	Stotfold (8)	1–2	London Colney (8)	67
23	Wroxham (8)	4–1	Halstead Town (8)	126
24	Brentwood (9)	0–2	Haringey Borough (8)	73
25	Kingsbury Town (8)	1–2	Stowmarket Town (8)	48
26	Harpenden Town (8)	6–1	Woodbridge Town (8)	65
27	Needham Market (9)	0–3	Norwich United (8)	79
28	Romford (9)	0–2	Bury Town (8)	166
29	Tiptree United (8)	0–1	Cogenhoe United (8)	92
30	Northampton Spencer (8)	2–2	Desborough Town (8)	76
replay	Desborough Town (8)	4–2	Northampton Spencer (8)	
31	Broxbourne Borough V&E (8)	0–2	Yaxley (8)	26
32	Mildenhall Town (8)	2–1	Ilford (9)	103
33	St Margaretsbury (8)	0–0	Henley Town (8)	46
replay	Henley Town (8)	0–3	St Margaretsbury (8)	

Tie	Home team (tier)	Score	Away team (tier)	Att.
34	Bedford United & Valerio (8)	1–0	Harefield United (8)	32
35	Southend Manor (9)	1–1	Buckingham Town (8)	30
replay	Buckingham Town (8)	4–1	Southend Manor (9)	
36	Ruislip Manor (8)	2–2	Ely City (9)	32
replay	Ely City (9)	0–2	Ruislip Manor (8)	
37	Hadleigh United (9)	0–1	Wootton Blue Cross (8)	72
38	Brackley Town (8)	2–1	Hullbridge Sports (9)	75
39	Royston Town (8)	0–3	Ford Sports Daventry (8)	85
40	Great Yarmouth Town (8)	4–1	Southall Town (8)	271
41	St Leonards (8)	1–4	Arundel (8)	127
42	Thatcham Town (8)	6–0	Selsey (8)	88
43	East Preston (8)	2–3	Andover (8)	124
44	Walton Casuals (8)	5–0	Westfield (8)	78
45	Brockenhurst (8)	2–3	VCD Athletic (8)	59
46	Wokingham Town (8)	2–0	Chertsey Town (8)	136
47	Chichester City United (8)	4–1	Tunbridge Wells (8)	115
48	Sandhurst Town (8)	2–1	Camberley Town (8)	106
49	Didcot Town (8)	2–1	Ramsgate (8)	131
50	Saltdean United (9)	0–4	Cray Wanderers (8)	104
51	Bedfont (8)	4–0	Littlehampton Town (9)	54
52	Horsham YMCA (8)	3–3	Gosport Borough (8)	105
replay	Gosport Borough (8)	1–0	Horsham YMCA (8)	
53	Eastbourne United Association (9)	1–0	Lordswood (8)	102
54	BAT Sports (8)	3–1	Cobham (8)	109
55	Carterton Town (8)	1–0	Hungerford Town (8)	64
56	Lancing (9)	0–3	Whitehawk (8)	94
57	AFC Totton (8)	3–0	Erith Town (8)	68
58	Reading Town (8)	1–2	Lymington & New Milton (8)	56
59	Barnstaple Town (8)	2–3	Exmouth Town (8)	126
60	Highworth Town (8)	3–1	Shortwood United (8)	85
61	Frome Town (8)	1–0	Tuffley Rovers (8)	96
62	Shepton Mallet (9)	0–1	Falmouth Town (10)	126
63	Minehead Town (9)	2–1	Liskeard Athletic (10)	94
64	Devizes Town (8)	0–4	Christchurch (8)	101
65	Chard Town (9)	0–3	Paulton Rovers (8)	58

== Preliminary round ==
Matches played on weekend of Saturday 30 August 2003. A total of 396 clubs took part in this stage of the competition, including the 65 winners from the extra preliminary round, 217 clubs from Levels 8-10, who get a bye in the extra preliminary round and 114 entering at this stage from the five divisions at Level 7 of English football. The round featured three clubs from Level 10 (all from the South Western Football League) still in the competition, being the lowest ranked clubs in this round.

Tie	Home team (tier)	Score	Away team (tier)	Att.
1	Brigg Town (8)	2–2	Billingham Town (8)	187
replay	Billingham Town (8)	1–0	Brigg Town (8)	157
2	Maine Road (9)	2–4	Ashington (9)	45
3	Bishop Auckland (7)	8–0	Flixton (9)	145
4	Harrogate Railway Athletic (8)	w/o	Hatfield Main	
Walkover for Harrogate Railway Athletic – Hatfield Main removed
5	Armthorpe Welfare (8)	w/o	Louth United	
Walkover for Armthorpe Welfare – Louth United removed
6	Chadderton (9)	1–2	Holker Old Boys (9)	86
7	Peterlee Newtown (8)	1–2	Bridlington Town (7)	111
8	Mossley (8)	1–1	Curzon Ashton (8)	236
replay	Curzon Ashton (8)	2–3	Mossley (8)	253
9	Bamber Bridge (7)	3–1	Prescot Cables (7)	187
10	Stocksbridge Park Steels (7)	2–1	Squires Gate (8)	120
11	Goole (8)	2–4	Rossendale United (7)	227
12	Witton Albion (7)	4–1	Nelson (9)	240
13	Thackley (8)	0–1	Ossett Town (7)	111
14	Skelmersdale United (8)	3–0	Atherton Laburnum Rovers (8)	104
15	Pontefract Collieries (9)	0–2	Clitheroe (8)	102
16	Blackpool Mechanics (9)	1–1	Colwyn Bay (7)	80
replay	Colwyn Bay (7)	3–1	Blackpool Mechanics (9)	
17	Crook Town (9)	2–3	Guiseley (7)	
18	Tow Law Town (8)	1–1	Salford City (8)	126
replay	Salford City (8)	4–3	Tow Law Town (8)	111
19	South Shields (9)	0–0	Bedlington Terriers (8)	189
replay	Bedlington Terriers (8)	4–1	South Shields (9)	138
20	Willington (9)	0–5	Consett (9)	72
21	Fleetwood Town (8)	3–0	Parkgate (9)	144
22	Newcastle Blue Star (9)	1–2	Dunston Federation Brewery (8)	139
23	Billingham Synthonia (8)	1–1	Chorley (7)	112
replay	Chorley (7)	3–1	Billingham Synthonia (8)	279
24	Hyde United (7)	6–1	Hallam (8)	228
25	Liversedge (8)	3–1	Gateshead (7)	92
26	Guisborough Town (8)	1–1	Kendal Town (7)	86
replay	Kendal Town (7)	2–2 (7–8 p)	Guisborough Town (8)	159
27	Tadcaster Albion (9)	0–4	Winsford United (9)	50
28	Great Harwood Town (9)	0–3	North Ferriby United (7)	111
29	Cheadle Town (9)	1–2	Chester-le-Street Town (8)	61
30	Woodley Sports (8)	1–1	Ramsbottom United (8)	113
replay	Ramsbottom United (8)	3–0	Woodley Sports (8)	
31	Durham City (8)	0–0	Rossington Main (9)	127
replay	Rossington Main (9)	0–1	Durham City (8)	111
32	Horden Colliery Welfare (8)	0–1	Brandon United (8)	106
33	Esh Winning (8)	1–3	Bacup Borough (8)	104
34	Whickham (9)	2–2	Hebburn Town (9)	180
replay	Hebburn Town (9)	1–2	Whickham (9)	159
35	Thornaby (8)	5–1	Easington Colliery (9)	47
36	Shildon (8)	2–1	Workington (7)	240
37	Selby Town (8)	0–0	Washington (8)	102
replay	Washington (8)	3–3 (4–5 p)	Selby Town (8)	106
38	Maltby Main (9)	1–0	West Auckland Town (8)	55
39	Sheffield (8)	1–0	Jarrow Roofing BCA (8)	130
40	Pickering Town (8)	2–0	Whitley Bay (8)	205
41	Evenwood Town (9)	3–5	Oldham Town (9)	124
42	Hall Road Rangers (9)	1–1	Trafford (8)	107
replay	Trafford (8)	3–1	Hall Road Rangers (9)	130
43	Marske United (8)	3–0	Winterton Rangers (9)	104
44	Warrington Town (8)	1–0	Yorkshire Amateur (9)	92
45	Prudhoe Town (9)	2–0	Morpeth Town (8)	34
46	Ossett Albion (8)	2–1	Alsager Town (8)	106
47	Seaham Red Star (9)	3–4	Murton (9)	114
48	Atherton Collieries (8)	0–3	Farsley Celtic (7)	71
49	Gresley Rovers (7)	1–1	Buxton (8)	310
replay	Buxton (8)	4–0	Gresley Rovers (7)	360
50	Stamford (7)	2–0	Bourne Town (8)	244
51	Shepshed Dynamo (7)	0–1	Congleton Town (8)	148
52	Shirebrook Town (9)	2–1	Matlock Town (7)	297
53	Grosvenor Park (8)	0–0	Glapwell (8)	37
replay	Glapwell (8)	2–0	Grosvenor Park (8)	60
54	Quorn (8)	0–1	Gedling Town (9)	137
55	Studley (8)	3–0	Rushall Olympic (8)	104
56	Oadby Town (8)	5–1	Stratford Town (8)	205
57	Corby Town (7)	2–1	Lincoln United (7)	110
58	Bedworth United (7)	0–2	Halesowen Town (7)	262
59	Belper Town (7)	1–1	Boston Town (8)	208
replay	Boston Town (8)	0–1	Belper Town (7)	108
60	Mickleover Sports (8)	3–0	Ludlow Town (8)	80
61	Chasetown (8)	1–2	Sutton Coldfield Town (7)	217
62	Kidsgrove Athletic (7)	1–3	Rugby United (7)	174
63	Borrowash Victoria (8)	3–4	Biddulph Victoria (8)	52
64	Racing Club Warwick (8)	0–1	Stafford Town (8)	85
65	Rocester (8)	1–1	Ilkeston Town (7)	165
replay	Ilkeston Town (7)	3–1	Rocester (8)	238
66	Staveley Miners Welfare (9)	0–1	Sutton Town (9)	96
67	Atherstone United (7)	w/o	Pelsall Villa (8)	
Walkover for Pelsall Villa – Atherstone United removed
68	Eastwood Town (8)	2–2	Deeping Rangers (8)	111
replay	Deeping Rangers (8)	1–2	Eastwood Town (8)	252
69	Lincoln Moorlands (9)	1–2	Leek Town (7)	
70	Spalding United (8)	3–0	Glossop North End (8)	196
71	Stourport Swifts (7)	1–0	Boldmere St Michaels (8)	101
72	Cradley Town (8)	0–4	Bromsgrove Rovers (7)	164
73	Solihull Borough (7)	3–0	Stone Dominoes (8)	163
74	Leek CSOB (9)	2–3	Redditch United (7)	105
75	Barwell (8)	3–1	Oldbury United (8)	70
76	Newcastle Town (8)	3–0	Willenhall Town (8)	95
77	Stourbridge (8)	0–2	Causeway United (8)	190
78	Long Eaton United (9)	0–0	Norton United (9)	71
replay	Norton United (9)	0–2	Long Eaton United (9)	78
79	Gorleston (8)	w/o	Haverhill Rovers (9)	
Walkover for Haverhill Rovers – Gorleston removed
80	Burnham (7)	1–7	Arlesey Town (7)	85
81	Burnham Ramblers (9)	4–1	Potters Bar Town (8)	
82	Dunstable Town (7)	w/o	Saffron Walden Town	
Walkover for Dunstable Town – Saffron Walden Town removed
83	Leighton Town (8)	3–1	Wootton Blue Cross (8)	122
84	Tring Town	w/o	Mildenhall Town (8)	
Walkover for Mildenhall Town – Tring Town removed
85	Sawbridgeworth Town (9)	2–2	AFC Wallingford (8)	41
replay	AFC Wallingford (8)	2–0	Sawbridgeworth Town (9)	125
86	Newmarket Town (8)	5–0	Wembley (8)	142
87	Chalfont St Peter (8)	0–6	Chesham United (7)	145
88	Boreham Wood (7)	2–1	Desborough Town (8)	66
89	Ware (8)	2–2	London Colney (8)	102
replay	London Colney (8)	0–1	Ware (8)	90
90	Enfield Town (9)	2–1	Clacton Town (8)	356
91	Norwich United (8)	2–2	Leyton (7)	98
replay	Leyton (7)	2–1	Norwich United (8)	190
92	AFC Sudbury (8)	5–1	Diss Town (8)	347
93	Histon (7)	7–0	Yeading (7)	131

Tie	Home team (tier)	Score	Away team (tier)	Att.
94	Hampton & Richmond Borough (7)	3–0	Great Wakering Rovers (7)	157
95	Harpenden Town (8)	1–3	St Margaretsbury (8)	68
96	Haringey Borough (8)	1–3	Dereham Town (8)	65
97	Barton Rovers (7)	2–2	Rothwell Town (7)	134
replay	Rothwell Town (7)	3–0	Barton Rovers (7)	147
98	Stewart & Lloyds Corby (8)	3–0	Fakenham Town (8)	48
99	Milton Keynes City	w/o	Tilbury (7)	
Walkover for Tilbury – Milton Keynes City removed
100	Bedford United & Valerio (8)	0–2	St Neots Town (8)	70
101	Beaconsfield SYCOB (8)	1–1	Ipswich Wanderers (9)	78
replay	Ipswich Wanderers (9)	2–1	Beaconsfield SYCOB (8)	172
102	Wisbech Town (8)	1–2	Aveley (7)	289
103	Stowmarket Town (8)	0–2	Waltham Forest (7)	86
104	Stanway Rovers (9)	0–1	Staines Town (7)	140
105	Wivenhoe Town (7)	7–0	Bowers United (9)	104
106	Cheshunt (7)	2–3	Harlow Town (7)	155
107	Cogenhoe United (8)	1–2	Maldon Town (8)	94
108	Wingate & Finchley (7)	3–2	Bury Town (8)	127
109	Edgware Town (8)	2–2	Clapton (8)	85
replay	Clapton (8)	0–1	Edgware Town (8)	
110	Stansted (9)	0–7	Uxbridge (7)	87
111	Great Yarmouth Town (8)	0–1	Berkhamsted Town (7)	217
112	Raunds Town (8)	1–0	Hoddesdon Town (8)	86
113	Buckingham Town (8)	2–0	Ford Sports Daventry (8)	101
114	Hertford Town (8)	2–4	Lowestoft Town (8)	140
115	Yaxley (8)	2–1	Barking & East Ham United (7)	84
116	Ruislip Manor (8)	1–4	Soham Town Rangers (8)	78
117	Enfield (7)	1–1	Hemel Hempstead Town (7)	89
replay	Hemel Hempstead Town (7)	2–3	Enfield (7)	115
118	Wroxham (8)	6–1	Banbury United (7)	137
119	Flackwell Heath (8)	4–1	Concord Rangers (9)	83
120	Long Buckby (8)	1–5	King's Lynn (7)	210
121	Hanwell Town (8)	2–2	East Thurrock United (7)	85
replay	East Thurrock United (7)	6–3	Hanwell Town (8)	147
122	Witham Town (8)	2–0	Marlow (7)	77
123	Brook House (8)	1–3	Wealdstone (7)	223
124	Brackley Town (8)	4–2	Harwich & Parkeston (9)	93
125	Greenwich Borough (8)	1–1	Maidstone United (8)	314
replay	Maidstone United (8)	1–0	Greenwich Borough (8)	270
126	Hailsham Town (8)	0–1	Cowes Sports (8)	132
127	Chessington & Hook United (8)	2–0	Merstham (8)	118
128	Leatherhead (7)	3–1	Moneyfields (8)	113
129	Windsor & Eton (7)	0–1	Metropolitan Police (7)	134
130	Dartford (7)	1–0	Bashley (7)	257
131	Walton & Hersham (7)	0–2	Walton Casuals (8)	216
132	Three Bridges (8)	1–1	Redhill (8)	75
replay	Redhill (8)	0–3	Three Bridges (8)	86
133	Tonbridge Angels (7)	4–0	BAT Sports (8)	424
134	Fisher Athletic (7)	3–4	Bedfont (8)	91
135	Blackfield & Langley (8)	1–3	Thamesmead Town (8)	76
136	Abingdon United (8)	3–2	Cove (8)	44
137	Banstead Athletic (7)	0–2	Winchester City (8)	106
138	Arundel (8)	4–0	Hassocks (8)	94
139	Tooting & Mitcham United (7)	3–1	Ashford Town (Middx) (7)	235
140	Chipstead (8)	1–2	Ringmer (8)	778
141	Croydon (7)	1–1	Hythe Town (8)	
replay	Hythe Town (8)	1–1 (5–4 p)	Croydon (7)	165
142	Abingdon Town (8)	3–1	Chichester City United (8)	128
143	Whitchurch United (8)	4–1	Withdean 2000 (8)	50
144	Worthing (7)	7–0	Ash United (8)	259
145	Fleet Town (7)	1–0	Epsom & Ewell (7)	88
146	Slade Green (8)	1–2	Hartley Wintney (8)	57
147	Egham Town (7)	1–8	Thame United (7)	66
148	Sidlesham (8)	0–2	Sittingbourne (7)	61
149	AFC Totton (8)	3–1	AFC Newbury (8)	111
150	Didcot Town (8)	4–1	Eastbourne Town (8)	172
151	Ashford Town (Kent) (7)	3–0	Eastbourne United Association (9)	363
152	Gosport Borough (8)	2–4	Erith & Belvedere (7)	166
153	Hastings United (7)	1–3	Bracknell Town (7)	289
154	Southwick (8)	1–4	Burgess Hill Town (7)	203
155	VCD Athletic (8)	2–1	Eastleigh (7)	67
156	Beckenham Town (8)	2–5	Sandhurst Town (8)	28
157	Slough Town (7)	5–0	East Grinstead Town (8)	374
158	Dulwich Hamlet (7)	1–3	Folkestone Invicta (7)	265
159	Wokingham Town (8)	0–1	Deal Town (8)	104
160	Dorking (8)	3–5	Lewes (7)	222
161	Hillingdon Borough (8)	2–0	Corinthian-Casuals (7)	62
162	Wick (9)	0–5	Whyteleafe (7)	102
163	Oxford City (7)	5–1	Farnham Town (8)	98
164	Molesey (7)	1–2	Godalming & Guildford (8)	76
165	Croydon Athletic (7)	2–1	Herne Bay (8)	110
166	Bromley (7)	2–1	North Leigh (8)	262
167	Whitehawk (8)	0–2	Lymington & New Milton (8)	67
168	Thatcham Town (8)	1–2	Alton Town (8)	113
169	Whitstable Town (8)	1–3	Raynes Park Vale (8)	136
170	Cray Wanderers (8)	5–0	Pagham (8)	87
171	Peacehaven & Telscombe (9)	2–1	Chessington United (8)	61
172	Horsham (7)	1–2	Newport (Isle of Wight) (7)	297
173	Carterton Town (8)	1–2	Fareham Town (8)	82
174	Chatham Town (7)	2–4	Andover (8)	143
175	Bitton (9)	3–4	Christchurch (8)	162
176	Bideford (8)	1–3	Swindon Supermarine (7)	330
177	Backwell United (8)	2–0	Fairford Town (8)	41
178	Bishop Sutton (8)	1–0	Falmouth Town (10)	78
179	Bridport (8)	2–0	Street (9)	102
180	Cinderford Town (7)	1–3	Brislington (8)	130
181	Melksham Town (8)	0–4	Mangotsfield United (7)	156
182	Evesham United (7)	3–3	Hallen (9)	97
replay	Hallen (9)	2–1	Evesham United (7)	179
183	Taunton Town (7)	1–1	Bournemouth (8)	336
replay	Bournemouth (8)	0–5	Taunton Town (7)	269
184	St Blazey (10)	5–0	Willand Rovers (9)	140
185	Highworth Town (8)	4–3	Portland United (8)	132
186	Westbury United (9)	2–2	Keynsham Town (8)	103
replay	Keynsham Town (8)	2–5	Westbury United (9)	65
187	Minehead Town (9)	2–2	Welton Rovers (8)	80
replay	Welton Rovers (8)	2–1	Minehead Town (9)	75
188	Bemerton Heath Harlequins (8)	3–2	Torrington (8)	74
189	Bristol Manor Farm (9)	0–5	Gloucester City (7)	153
190	Frome Town (8)	1–1	Clevedon Town (7)	156
replay	Clevedon Town (7)	2–3	Frome Town (8)	182
191	Porthleven (10)	0–4	Team Bath (7)	238
192	Salisbury City (7)	4–0	Odd Down (8)	418
193	Elmore (8)	1–3	Wimborne Town (8)	61
194	Downton (8)	3–4	Exmouth Town (8)	70
195	Yate Town (7)	1–2	Cirencester Town (7)	197
196	Paulton Rovers (8)	2–0	Calne Town (9)	86
197	Bridgwater Town (8)	0–1	Corsham Town (9)	206
198	Dawlish Town (8)	1–2	Clevedon United (9)	68

== First qualifying round ==
Matches on weekend of Saturday 20 September 2003. A total of 198 clubs took part in this stage of the competition, all having progressed from the Preliminary round. St Blazey from the South Western Football League at Level 10 of English football were the lowest-ranked club to qualify for this round of the competition.

Tie	Home team (tier)	Score	Away team (tier)	Att.
1	Witton Albion (7)	7–0	Holker Old Boys (9)	279
2	Stocksbridge Park Steels (7)	6–1	Prudhoe Town (9)	103
3	Mossley (8)	1–6	Hyde United (7)	525
4	Rossendale United (7)	2–1	Harrogate Railway Athletic (8)	218
5	Clitheroe (8)	4–1	Brandon United (8)	222
Walkover for Brandon United – Clitheroe removed
6	Maltby Main (9)	4–2	Colwyn Bay (7)	110
7	Winsford United (9)	2–1	Marske United (8)	189
8	Oldham Town (9)	3–2	Liversedge (8)	120
9	Ossett Albion (8)	0–0	Ossett Town (7)	522
replay	Ossett Town (7)	1–3	Ossett Albion (8)	
10	Durham City (8)	0–2	Shildon (8)	221
11	Ashington (9)	3–1	Ramsbottom United (8)	271
12	Thornaby (8)	1–2	Guisborough Town (8)	90
13	Armthorpe Welfare (8)	0–0	Whickham (9)	72
replay	Whickham (9)	2–1	Armthorpe Welfare (8)	
14	Bamber Bridge (7)	2–0	Bacup Borough (8)	
15	Guiseley (7)	1–0	Trafford (8)	242
16	Bishop Auckland (7)	0–1	Pickering Town (8)	168
17	Chester-le-Street Town (8)	2–0	Murton (9)	71
18	Warrington Town (8)	6–1	North Ferriby United (7)	107
19	Chorley (7)	2–1	Selby Town (8)	222
20	Dunston Federation Brewery (8)	2–2	Billingham Town (8)	104
replay	Billingham Town (8)	0–1	Dunston Federation Brewery (8)	
21	Farsley Celtic (7)	1–1	Sheffield (8)	
replay	Sheffield (8)	1–3	Farsley Celtic (7)	
22	Bridlington Town (7)	5–0	Salford City (8)	311
23	Skelmersdale United (8)	2–0	Consett (9)	102
24	Fleetwood Town (8)	3–2	Bedlington Terriers (8)	158
25	Stourport Swifts (7)	0–3	Rugby United (7)	173
26	Oadby Town (8)	0–2	Stamford (7)	281
27	Barwell (8)	2–5	Newcastle Town (8)	113
28	Glapwell (8)	1–2	Gedling Town (9)	75
29	Shirebrook Town (9)	2–0	Stafford Town (8)	190
30	Studley (8)	0–1	Bromsgrove Rovers (7)	387
31	Solihull Borough (7)	0–3	Redditch United (7)	416
32	Long Eaton United (9)	0–2	Ilkeston Town (7)	484
33	Mickleover Sports (8)	0–0	Eastwood Town (8)	213
replay	Eastwood Town (8)	1–0	Mickleover Sports (8)	
34	Sutton Coldfield Town (7)	1–1	Causeway United (8)	118
replay	Causeway United (8)	0–3	Sutton Coldfield Town (7)	
35	Pelsall Villa (8)	0–4	Belper Town (7)	
36	Corby Town (7)	1–1	Halesowen Town (7)	228
replay	Halesowen Town (7)	3–2	Corby Town (7)	
37	Spalding United (8)	2–2	Sutton Town (9)	293
replay	Sutton Town (9)	0–5	Spalding United (8)	
38	Congleton Town (8)	1–0	Leek Town (7)	386
39	Biddulph Victoria (8)	1–1	Buxton (8)	326
replay	Buxton (8)	3–2	Biddulph Victoria (8)	
40	Newmarket Town (8)	6–1	Brackley Town (8)	160
41	Hampton & Richmond Borough (7)	1–0	Dunstable Town (7)	155
42	Harlow Town (7)	1–0	St Neots Town (8)	140
43	Waltham Forest (7)	1–3	Rothwell Town (7)	96
44	Dereham Town (8)	1–4	Tilbury (7)	120
45	Aveley (7)	1–2	Lowestoft Town (8)	107
46	Wealdstone (7)	0–1	Uxbridge (7)	326
47	Leyton (7)	4–0	Arlesey Town (7)	108
48	Edgware Town (8)	0–1	Enfield Town (9)	225
49	Ware (8)	2–2	Buckingham Town (8)	116
replay	Buckingham Town (8)	2–1	Ware (8)	

Tie	Home team (tier)	Score	Away team (tier)	Att.
50	Wingate & Finchley (7)	3–1	Raunds Town (8)	107
51	Mildenhall Town (8)	1–6	Histon (7)	168
52	AFC Wallingford (8)	2–0	Ipswich Wanderers (9)	137
53	Berkhamsted Town (7)	0–9	AFC Sudbury (8)	376
54	Chesham United (7)	2–0	Yaxley (8)	202
55	Wroxham (8)	2–2	Flackwell Heath (8)	163
replay	Flackwell Heath (8)	1–0	Wroxham (8)	
56	East Thurrock United (7)	2–1	Staines Town (7)	140
57	Wivenhoe Town (7)	2–3	Soham Town Rangers (8)	124
58	Boreham Wood (7)	2–1	Maldon Town (8)	121
59	St Margaretsbury (8)	2–2	Leighton Town (8)	83
replay	Leighton Town (8)	0–1	St Margaretsbury (8)	
60	Haverhill Rovers (9)	1–2	Burnham Ramblers (9)	230
61	King's Lynn (7)	2–2	Stewart & Lloyds Corby (8)	871
replay	Stewart & Lloyds Corby (8)	0–3	King's Lynn (7)	
62	Enfield (7)	4–0	Witham Town (8)	99
63	Whitchurch United (8)	0–3	Tooting & Mitcham United (7)	156
64	Raynes Park Vale (8)	0–2	Folkestone Invicta (7)	120
65	Lymington & New Milton (8)	1–0	Erith & Belvedere (7)	133
66	Cray Wanderers (8)	4–1	Sandhurst Town (8)	129
67	Deal Town (8)	1–2	Leatherhead (7)	170
68	Ashford Town (Kent) (7)	1–1	Bromley (7)	427
replay	Bromley (7)	1–0	Ashford Town (Kent) (7)	
69	Tonbridge Angels (7)	1–1	Lewes (7)	617
replay	Lewes (7)	2–1	Tonbridge Angels (7)	
70	Hillingdon Borough (8)	1–1	Oxford City (7)	85
replay	Oxford City (7)	2–1	Hillingdon Borough (8)	
71	Chessington & Hook United (8)	1–4	Thamesmead Town (8)	123
72	Slough Town (7)	2–0	Godalming & Guildford (8)	319
73	Metropolitan Police (7)	2–3	Winchester City (8)	180
74	Fareham Town (8)	1–2	Newport (Isle of Wight) (7)	210
75	Hythe Town (8)	3–1	Alton Town (8)	136
76	Burgess Hill Town (7)	2–1	Abingdon United (8)	220
77	Thame United (7)	4–2	VCD Athletic (8)	145
78	Worthing (7)	4–1	Walton Casuals (8)	390
79	Dartford (7)	3–0	Peacehaven & Telscombe (9)	284
80	Sittingbourne (7)	1–0	Whyteleafe (7)	267
81	Andover (8)	5–0	Arundel (8)	278
82	Abingdon Town (8)	4–3	Ringmer (8)	88
83	Bracknell Town (7)	3–2	Hartley Wintney (8)	154
84	Three Bridges (8)	1–2	Fleet Town (7)	129
85	Croydon Athletic (7)	7–1	Bedfont (8)	142
86	AFC Totton (8)	1–3	Didcot Town (8)	94
87	Maidstone United (8)	4–0	Cowes Sports (8)	350
88	Clevedon United (9)	4–1	Frome Town (8)	141
89	Paulton Rovers (8)	2–0	Bemerton Heath Harlequins (8)	133
90	Gloucester City (7)	0–0	Team Bath (7)	377
replay	Team Bath (7)	0–2	Gloucester City (7)	
91	Christchurch (8)	2–3	Westbury United (9)	103
92	Mangotsfield United (7)	4–3	Bridport (8)	229
93	Cirencester Town (7)	2–1	Swindon Supermarine (7)	188
94	Corsham Town (9)	1–2	Brislington (8)	160
95	Salisbury City (7)	4–1	Taunton Town (7)	551
96	Exmouth Town (8)	2–2	St Blazey (10)	
replay	St Blazey (10)	2–2 (3–4 p)	Exmouth Town (8)	
97	Hallen (9)	1–2	Highworth Town (8)	84
98	Backwell United (8)	1–4	Wimborne Town (8)	49
99	Welton Rovers (8)	3–3	Bishop Sutton (8)	70
replay	Bishop Sutton (8)	1–0	Welton Rovers (8)	

== Second qualifying round ==
Matches played on weekend of Saturday 27 September 2003. A total of 168 clubs took part in this stage of the competition, including the 99 winners from the first qualifying round and 69 Level 6 clubs, from Premier divisions of the Isthmian League, Northern Premier League and Southern Football League, entering at this stage. The round featured eleven clubs from Level 9 still in the competition, being the lowest ranked clubs in this round.

Tie	Home team (tier)	Score	Away team (tier)	Att.
1	Frickley Athletic (6)	0–0	Shildon (8)	253
replay	Shildon (8)	5–1	Frickley Athletic (6)	664
2	Whitby Town (6)	3–0	Winsford United (9)	282
3	Runcorn Halton (6)	3–0	Guiseley (7)	234
4	Droylsden (6)	2–2	Burscough (6)	151
replay	Burscough (6)	1–2	Droylsden (6)	166
5	Pickering Town (8)	0–1	Ossett Albion (8)	258
6	Vauxhall Motors (6)	3–1	Southport (6)	492
7	Dunston Federation Brewery (8)	1–1	Fleetwood Town (8)	165
replay	Fleetwood Town (8)	1–2	Dunston Federation Brewery (8)	185
8	Bridlington Town (7)	2–2	Farsley Celtic (7)	359
replay	Farsley Celtic (7)	3–0	Bridlington Town (7)	182
9	Stocksbridge Park Steels (7)	3–2	Brandon United (8)	139
10	Ashton United (6)	1–1	Hyde United (7)	446
replay	Hyde United (7)	1–2	Ashton United (6)	489
11	Blyth Spartans (6)	3–0	Bamber Bridge (7)	464
12	Marine (6)	3–1	Rossendale United (7)	332
13	Chester-le-Street Town (8)	0–2	Bradford (Park Avenue) (6)	201
14	Maltby Main (9)	2–3	Ashington (9)	121
15	Barrow (6)	2–0	Harrogate Town (6)	1,250
16	Lancaster City (6)	2–0	Altrincham (6)	489
17	Gainsborough Trinity (6)	6–0	Skelmersdale United (8)	376
18	Witton Albion (7)	0–1	Wakefield & Emley (6)	348
19	Guisborough Town (8)	2–2	Stalybridge Celtic (6)	205
replay	Stalybridge Celtic (6)	3–1	Guisborough Town (8)	305
20	Chorley (7)	5–0	Whickham (9)	239
21	Radcliffe Borough (6)	2–1	Oldham Town (9)	294
22	Spennymoor United (6)	0–2	Warrington Town (8)	202
23	Gedling Town (9)	1–0	Alfreton Town (6)	280
24	Newcastle Town (8)	2–1	Sutton Coldfield Town (7)	107
25	Cambridge City (6)	3–1	Ilkeston Town (7)	294
26	Hednesford Town (6)	0–2	Bromsgrove Rovers (7)	570
27	Rothwell Town (7)	0–1	Bedford Town (6)	410
28	Stafford Rangers (6)	1–2	Grantham Town (6)	797
29	Redditch United (7)	1–1	Shirebrook Town (9)	337
replay	Shirebrook Town (9)	2–2 (4–1 p)	Redditch United (7)	340
30	Spalding United (8)	1–2	Halesowen Town (7)	393
31	Stamford (7)	0–3	Kettering Town (6)	862
32	Hucknall Town (6)	1–1	Congleton Town (8)	447
replay	Congleton Town (8)	3–2	Hucknall Town (6)	290
33	Soham Town Rangers (8)	0–2	Histon (7)	281
34	Buxton (8)	1–0	Belper Town (7)	915
35	Nuneaton Borough (6)	1–0	Worcester City (6)	1,352
36	Worksop Town (6)	2–2	King's Lynn (7)	834
replay	King's Lynn (7)	1–4	Worksop Town (6)	1,209
37	Rugby United (7)	1–3	Eastwood Town (8)	364
38	Moor Green (6)	1–2	Hinckley United (6)	271
39	Basingstoke Town (6)	1–0	Cray Wanderers (8)	351
40	Sutton United (6)	0–0	Bishop's Stortford (6)	429
replay	Bishop's Stortford (6)	1–1 (5–3 p)	Sutton United (6)	347

Tie	Home team (tier)	Score	Away team (tier)	Att.
41	Buckingham Town (8)	1–2	Thurrock (6)	182
42	Bromley (7)	2–0	Dartford (7)	542
43	Sittingbourne (7)	1–2	East Thurrock United (7)	301
44	Boreham Wood (7)	4–0	Burgess Hill Town (7)	165
45	Bracknell Town (7)	4–2	Tilbury (7)	178
46	Hendon (6)	4–0	Enfield (7)	158
47	Canvey Island (6)	6–1	Uxbridge (7)	321
48	Wingate & Finchley (7)	1–2	Oxford City (7)	159
49	Hampton & Richmond Borough (7)	2–1	Kingstonian (6)	660
50	Heybridge Swifts (6)	3–3	Worthing (7)	297
replay	Worthing (7)	2–0	Heybridge Swifts (6)	452
51	Lowestoft Town (8)	2–1	Lewes (7)	317
52	Hythe Town (8)	0–4	Maidstone United (8)	603
53	Leyton (7)	1–0	Leatherhead (7)	140
54	Slough Town (7)	1–1	Welling United (6)	465
replay	Welling United (6)	4–1	Slough Town (7)	418
55	Thame United (7)	4–0	Thamesmead Town (8)	150
56	Abingdon Town (8)	1–2	Chesham United (7)	183
57	Hornchurch (6)	2–1	Billericay Town (6)	836
58	Newmarket Town (8)	3–0	Fleet Town (7)	221
59	Braintree Town (6)	3–2	Aylesbury United (6)	214
60	St Albans City (6)	2–4	Grays Athletic (6)	420
61	Hayes (6)	4–2	Tooting & Mitcham United (7)	272
62	Enfield Town (9)	0–1	Carshalton Athletic (6)	501
63	Hitchin Town (6)	0–0	Folkestone Invicta (7)	319
replay	Folkestone Invicta (7)	3–0	Hitchin Town (6)	428
64	Ford United (6)	3–1	Didcot Town (8)	117
65	Croydon Athletic (7)	2–0	AFC Wallingford (8)	150
66	Northwood (6)	2–4	AFC Sudbury (8)	385
67	Dover Athletic (6)	4–0	Maidenhead United (6)	703
68	Burnham Ramblers (9)	1–3	St Margaretsbury (8)	160
69	Eastbourne Borough (6)	2–2	Chelmsford City (6)	608
replay	Chelmsford City (6)	0–2	Eastbourne Borough (6)	441
70	Harrow Borough (6)	0–0	Flackwell Heath (8)	120
replay	Flackwell Heath (8)	0–1	Harrow Borough (6)	128
71	Harlow Town (7)	0–4	Crawley Town (6)	372
72	Newport County (6)	3–2	Weymouth (6)	769
73	Bognor Regis Town (6)	0–4	Havant & Waterlooville (6)	945
74	Newport (Isle of Wight) (7)	2–1	Tiverton Town (6)	378
75	Weston-super-Mare (6)	4–1	Dorchester Town (6)	293
76	Paulton Rovers (8)	4–1	Bishop Sutton (8)	123
77	Mangotsfield United (7)	3–0	Wimborne Town (8)	233
78	Brislington (8)	0–2	Bath City (6)	516
79	Salisbury City (7)	1–1	Westbury United (9)	570
replay	Westbury United (9)	1–2	Salisbury City (7)	478
80	Chippenham Town (6)	2–1	Winchester City (8)	461
81	Gloucester City (7)	2–0	Merthyr Tydfil (6)	476
82	Lymington & New Milton (8)	8–2	Clevedon United (9)	130
83	Cirencester Town (7)	3–2	Andover (8)	202
84	Exmouth Town (8)	0–1	Highworth Town (8)	258

== Third qualifying round ==
Matches played on weekend of Saturday 11 October 2003. A total of 84 clubs took part, all having progressed from the second qualifying round. Ashington, Gedling Town and Shirebrook Town from Level 9 of English football were the lowest-ranked club to qualify for this round of the competition.

Tie	Home team (tier)	Score	Away team (tier)	Att.
1	Ashton United (6)	2–1	Barrow (6)	429
2	Farsley Celtic (7)	3–0	Worksop Town (6)	374
3	Shirebrook Town (9)	1–3	Shildon (8)	662
4	Nuneaton Borough (6)	1–1	Runcorn Halton (6)	1,201
replay	Runcorn Halton (6)	2–2 (5–4 p)	Nuneaton Borough (6)	347
5	Ashington (9)	1–3	Grantham Town (6)	659
6	Gedling Town (9)	0–1	Stalybridge Celtic (6)	210
7	Eastwood Town (8)	1–1	Stocksbridge Park Steels (7)	277
replay	Stocksbridge Park Steels (7)	3–2	Eastwood Town (8)	253
8	Newcastle Town (8)	1–1	Ossett Albion (8)	184
replay	Ossett Albion (8)	4–4 (3–0 p)	Newcastle Town (8)	334
9	Marine (6)	1–2	Dunston Federation Brewery (8)	329
10	Blyth Spartans (6)	2–1	Halesowen Town (7)	667
11	Bradford (Park Avenue) (6)	1–1	Vauxhall Motors (6)	321
replay	Vauxhall Motors (6)	1–3	Bradford (Park Avenue) (6)	278
12	Warrington Town (8)	0–0	Whitby Town (6)	253
replay	Whitby Town (6)	2–1	Warrington Town (8)	364
13	Wakefield & Emley (6)	0–2	Hinckley United (6)	248
14	Droylsden (6)	0–2	Gainsborough Trinity (6)	345
15	Buxton (8)	2–1	Radcliffe Borough (6)	1,416
16	Chorley (7)	1–1	Lancaster City (6)	616
replay	Lancaster City (6)	1–0	Chorley (7)	452
17	Congleton Town (8)	0–2	Bromsgrove Rovers (7)	544
18	Kettering Town (6)	2–0	St Margaretsbury (8)	790
19	Folkestone Invicta (7)	1–1	Welling United (6)	734
replay	Welling United (6)	2–2 (5–3 p)	Folkestone Invicta (7)	602
20	Bromley (7)	1–1	Thurrock (6)	461
replay	Thurrock (6)	3–0	Bromley (7)	231

Tie	Home team (tier)	Score	Away team (tier)	Att.
21	Histon (7)	0–0	Newmarket Town (8)	402
replay	Newmarket Town (8)	0–1	Histon (7)	938
22	Hornchurch (6)	5–0	Carshalton Athletic (6)	611
23	Canvey Island (6)	4–3	Dover Athletic (6)	528
24	Ford United (6)	3–2	Worthing (7)	167
25	Cambridge City (6)	3–0	Lowestoft Town (8)	357
26	Maidstone United (8)	1–1	Bishop's Stortford (6)	601
replay	Bishop's Stortford (6)	3–2	Maidstone United (8)	568
27	Hayes (6)	1–1	Boreham Wood (7)	350
replay	Boreham Wood (7)	3–1	Hayes (6)	268
28	East Thurrock United (7)	1–1	AFC Sudbury (8)	600
replay	AFC Sudbury (8)	1–1 (2–4 p)	East Thurrock United (7)	602
29	Leyton (7)	3–0	Bedford Town (6)	275
30	Grays Athletic (6)	3–0	Hendon (6)	406
31	Braintree Town (6)	0–4	Eastbourne Borough (6)	351
32	Crawley Town (6)	6–1	Croydon Athletic (7)	897
33	Basingstoke Town (6)	0–0	Bracknell Town (7)	429
replay	Bracknell Town (7)	1–0	Basingstoke Town (6)	375
34	Gloucester City (7)	4–3	Chippenham Town (6)	611
35	Thame United (7)	3–0	Bath City (6)	342
36	Oxford City (7)	0–3	Cirencester Town (7)	181
37	Havant & Waterlooville (6)	3–4	Salisbury City (7)	494
38	Newport (Isle of Wight) (7)	2–2	Harrow Borough (6)	415
replay	Harrow Borough (6)	2–0	Newport (Isle of Wight) (7)	181
39	Newport County (6)	3–6	Mangotsfield United (7)	667
40	Weston-super-Mare (6)	1–1	Chesham United (7)	303
replay	Chesham United (7)	1–2	Weston-super-Mare (6)	211
40	Lymington & New Milton (8)	2–0	Highworth Town (8)	200
42	Paulton Rovers (8)	2–1	Hampton & Richmond Borough (7)	300

== Fourth qualifying round ==
Matches played on weekend of Saturday 25 October 2003. A total of 64 clubs took part, 42 having progressed from the third qualifying round and 22 clubs from Conference Premier, forming Level 5 of English football, entering at this stage. The round featured six clubs from Level 8 still in the competition, being the lowest ranked clubs in this round.

Tie	Home team (tier)	Score	Away team (tier)	Att.
1	Ossett Albion (8)	0–1	Stalybridge Celtic (6)	621
2	Dunston Federation Brewery (8)	0–1	Lancaster City (6)	310
3	Ashton United (6)	1–2	Grantham Town (6)	413
4	Blyth Spartans (6)	0–1	Chester City (5)	1,105
5	Bromsgrove Rovers (7)	2–2	Whitby Town (6)	814
replay	Whitby Town (6)	2–1	Bromsgrove Rovers (7)	
6	Burton Albion (5)	6–0	Buxton (8)	1,980
7	Morecambe (5)	2–4	Shrewsbury Town (5)	1,651
8	Telford United (5)	3–3	Tamworth (5)	1,431
replay	Tamworth (5)	2–3	Telford United (5)	1,221
9	Scarborough (5)	3–1	Hinckley United (6)	1,207
10	Farsley Celtic (7)	1–1	Gainsborough Trinity (6)	774
replay	Gainsborough Trinity (6)	3–0	Farsley Celtic (7)	845
11	Accrington Stanley (5)	2–0	Leigh RMI (5)	1,361
12	Northwich Victoria (5)	1–0	Halifax Town (5)	1,101
13	Runcorn Halton (6)	0–1	Bradford (Park Avenue) (6)	379
14	Shildon (8)	6–0	Stocksbridge Park Steels (7)	1,046
15	Leyton (7)	1–2	Histon (7)	288
16	Eastbourne Borough (6)	2–2	Stevenage Borough (5)	1,305
replay	Stevenage Borough (5)	1–0	Eastbourne Borough (6)	1,205

Tie	Home team (tier)	Score	Away team (tier)	Att.
17	Bracknell Town (7)	0–3	Barnet (5)	1,069
18	Thame United (7)	1–2	Farnborough Town (5)	909
19	Grays Athletic (6)	3–3	Margate (5)	665
replay	Margate (5)	3–3 (1–3 p)	Grays Athletic (6)	411
20	Welling United (6)	2–3	Weston-super-Mare (6)	678
21	Boreham Wood (7)	1–0	Kettering Town (6)	501
22	Forest Green Rovers (5)	1–3	Aldershot Town (5)	1,137
23	Thurrock (6)	2–1	Dagenham & Redbridge (5)	957
24	Harrow Borough (6)	1–6	Hereford United (5)	655
25	Bishop's Stortford (6)	2–0	Gloucester City (7)	768
26	Salisbury City (7)	5–1	Lymington & New Milton (8)	1,190
27	Cambridge City (6)	2–3	Ford United (6)	412
28	Mangotsfield United (7)	1–2	Canvey Island (6)	1.083
29	Hornchurch (6)	1–0	Paulton Rovers (8)	747
30	East Thurrock United (7)	1–1	Woking (5)	1,215
replay	Woking (5)	2–0	East Thurrock United (7)	1,781
31	Cirencester Town (7)	2–4	Crawley Town (6)	715
32	Exeter City (5)	0–0	Gravesend & Northfleet (5)	2,686
replay	Gravesend & Northfleet (5)	3–3 (6–5 p)	Exeter City (5)	1,227

== Competition proper ==
See 2003–04 FA Cup for details of the rounds from the first round proper onwards.
