= 1985–86 Northern Football League =

The 1985–86 Northern Football League season was the 88th in the history of Northern Football League, a football competition in England.

== Division One ==
Northern Football League Division One
- Season: 1985–86
- Champions: Bishop Auckland
- Relegated: Billingham Synthonia; Billingham Town
- Matches: 380
- Goals: 1,258 (3.31 per match)

Division One featured 16 clubs which competed in the division last season, along with four new clubs, promoted from Division Two:

- Bedlington Terriers
- Billingham Town
- Brandon United
- Hartlepool United reserves

=== League table ===
| Pos | Team | Pld | W | D | L | GF | GA | GD | Pts | Promotion or relegation |
|---|---|---|---|---|---|---|---|---|---|---|
| 1 | Bishop Auckland | 38 | 21 | 10 | 7 | 79 | 45 | +34 | 73 | |
| 2 | Bedlington Terriers | 38 | 19 | 10 | 9 | 65 | 44 | +21 | 67 | |
| 3 | South Bank | 38 | 18 | 12 | 8 | 66 | 36 | +30 | 66 | |
| 4 | Blyth Spartans | 38 | 19 | 9 | 10 | 79 | 52 | +27 | 66 | |
| 5 | Tow Law Town | 38 | 18 | 10 | 10 | 72 | 47 | +25 | 64 | |
| 6 | Peterlee Newtown | 38 | 19 | 6 | 13 | 66 | 56 | +10 | 63 | |
| 7 | Chester-le-Street Town | 38 | 18 | 7 | 13 | 62 | 53 | +9 | 61 | |
| 8 | Brandon United | 38 | 16 | 10 | 12 | 72 | 68 | +4 | 58 | |
| 9 | Crook Town | 38 | 15 | 8 | 15 | 73 | 70 | +3 | 53 | |
| 10 | Hartlepool United reserves | 38 | 14 | 10 | 14 | 65 | 69 | −4 | 52 | |
| 11 | Gretna | 38 | 13 | 11 | 14 | 70 | 69 | +1 | 50 | |
| 12 | North Shields | 38 | 14 | 8 | 16 | 65 | 72 | −7 | 50 | |
| 13 | Consett | 38 | 13 | 9 | 16 | 44 | 58 | −14 | 48 | |
| 14 | Spennymoor United | 38 | 12 | 11 | 15 | 51 | 54 | −3 | 47 | |
| 15 | Ryhope Community | 38 | 13 | 7 | 18 | 50 | 69 | −19 | 46 | |
| 16 | Whitby Town | 38 | 12 | 9 | 17 | 59 | 74 | −15 | 45 | |
| 17 | Whitley Bay | 38 | 11 | 8 | 19 | 65 | 73 | −8 | 41 | |
| 18 | Ferryhill Athletic | 38 | 11 | 6 | 21 | 62 | 94 | −32 | 39 | |
| 19 | Billingham Synthonia | 38 | 8 | 11 | 19 | 47 | 66 | −19 | 35 | Relegated to Division Two |
| 20 | Billingham Town | 38 | 6 | 8 | 24 | 46 | 89 | −43 | 26 | Relegated to Division Two |

Source: fchd
Rules for classification: 1) points; 2) goal difference; 3) number of goals scored.

== Division Two ==
Northern Football League Division Two
- Season: 1985–86
- Champions: Blue Star
- Promoted: Blue Star; Easington Colliery
- Matches: 380
- Goals: 1,312 (3.45 per match)

Division Two featured 14 clubs which competed in the division last season, along with six new clubs.

- Clubs relegated from Division One:
  - Horden Colliery Welfare
  - Shildon
- Clubs joined from the Wearside Football League:
  - Blue Star
  - Easington Colliery
  - Stockton
- Plus:
  - Guisborough Town, transferred from the Northern Counties East League

=== League table ===
| Pos | Team | Pld | W | D | L | GF | GA | GD | Pts | Promotion or relegation |
|---|---|---|---|---|---|---|---|---|---|---|
| 1 | Blue Star | 38 | 36 | 1 | 1 | 133 | 15 | +118 | 109 | Promoted to Division One |
| 2 | Easington Colliery | 38 | 27 | 7 | 4 | 101 | 36 | +65 | 88 | Promoted to Division One |
| 3 | Guisborough Town | 38 | 25 | 7 | 6 | 88 | 36 | +52 | 82 | |
| 4 | Durham City | 38 | 22 | 9 | 7 | 89 | 48 | +41 | 75 | |
| 5 | West Auckland Town | 38 | 19 | 7 | 12 | 64 | 61 | +3 | 64 | |
| 6 | Seaham Colliery Welfare | 38 | 17 | 7 | 14 | 63 | 56 | +7 | 58 | |
| 7 | Stockton | 38 | 15 | 9 | 14 | 62 | 56 | +6 | 54 | |
| 8 | Ashington | 38 | 15 | 9 | 14 | 81 | 85 | −4 | 54 | |
| 9 | Norton & Stockton Ancients | 38 | 16 | 5 | 17 | 67 | 72 | −5 | 53 | |
| 10 | Alnwick Town | 38 | 13 | 12 | 13 | 62 | 56 | +6 | 51 | |
| 11 | Willington | 38 | 15 | 5 | 18 | 53 | 65 | −12 | 50 | |
| 12 | Langley Park | 38 | 11 | 11 | 16 | 43 | 57 | −14 | 44 | |
| 13 | Horden Colliery Welfare | 38 | 12 | 8 | 18 | 54 | 85 | −31 | 44 | |
| 14 | Shotton Comrades | 38 | 9 | 12 | 17 | 56 | 82 | −26 | 39 | |
| 15 | Darlington reserves | 38 | 9 | 9 | 20 | 45 | 86 | −41 | 36 | Resigned from the league |
| 16 | Northallerton Town | 38 | 10 | 5 | 23 | 54 | 83 | −29 | 35 | |
| 17 | Evenwood Town | 38 | 9 | 7 | 22 | 51 | 79 | −28 | 34 | |
| 18 | Darlington Cleveland Bridge | 38 | 10 | 4 | 24 | 55 | 89 | −34 | 34 | |
| 19 | Shildon | 38 | 6 | 15 | 17 | 42 | 66 | −24 | 33 | |
| 20 | Esh Winning | 38 | 5 | 9 | 24 | 49 | 99 | −50 | 24 | |

Source: fchd
Rules for classification: 1) points; 2) goal difference; 3) number of goals scored.
