= 1984–85 Northern Football League =

The 1984–85 Northern Football League season was the 87th in the history of Northern Football League, a football competition in England.

== Division One ==
Northern Football League Division One
- Season: 1984–85
- Champions: Bishop Auckland
- Relegated: Horden Colliery Welfare; Shildon
- Matches: 306
- Goals: 973 (3.18 per match)

Division One featured 16 clubs which competed in the division last season, along with two new clubs, promoted from Division Two:

- Chester-le-Street Town
- Ryhope Community

=== League table ===
Pos	Team	Pld	W	D	L	GF	GA	GD	Pts	Promotion or relegation
1	Bishop Auckland	34	26	4	4	92	26	+66	82	
2	Blyth Spartans	34	24	3	7	86	36	+50	75	
3	South Bank	34	19	10	5	62	30	+32	67	
4	Tow Law Town	34	18	10	6	57	45	+12	64	
5	North Shields	34	19	5	10	62	49	+13	62	
6	Gretna	34	17	8	9	56	39	+17	59	
7	Whitby Town	34	17	7	10	61	44	+17	58	
8	Chester-le-Street Town	34	15	6	13	54	44	+10	51	
9	Peterlee Newtown	34	13	7	14	51	44	+7	46	
10	Ryhope Community	34	13	6	15	49	55	−6	45	
11	Spennymoor United	34	11	8	15	63	56	+7	41	
12	Billingham Synthonia	34	11	5	18	39	65	−26	38	
13	Whitley Bay	34	8	11	15	51	55	−4	32 (Note: Whitley Bay were deducted three points.)	
14	Ferryhill Athletic	34	8	8	18	39	70	−31	32	
15	Consett	34	8	3	23	42	95	−53	27	
16	Crook Town	34	6	8	20	32	66	−34	26	
17	Horden Colliery Welfare	34	5	10	19	36	67	−31	25	Relegated to Division Two
18	Shildon	34	5	7	22	41	87	−46	22	Relegated to Division Two

Source: fchd
Rules for classification: 1) points; 2) goal difference; 3) number of goals scored.

== Division Two ==
Northern Football League Division Two
- Season: 1984–85
- Champions: Brandon United
- Promoted: Brandon United; Bedlington Terriers; Hartlepool United reserves Billingham Town
- Matches: 306
- Goals: 1,056 (3.45 per match)

Division Two featured 16 clubs which competed in the division last season, along with two new clubs, relegated from Division One:

- Ashington
- Evenwood Town

=== League table ===
Pos	Team	Pld	W	D	L	GF	GA	GD	Pts	Promotion or relegation
1	Brandon United	34	27	2	5	102	38	+64	83	Promoted to Division One
2	Bedlington Terriers	34	25	5	4	77	28	+49	80	Promoted to Division One
3	Hartlepool United reserves	34	25	2	7	86	37	+49	77	Promoted to Division One
4	Billingham Town	34	22	6	6	74	32	+42	72	Promoted to Division One
5	Durham City	34	21	9	4	73	36	+37	72	
6	Seaham Colliery Welfare	34	19	7	8	76	41	+35	64	
7	Willington	34	17	5	12	59	57	+2	56	
8	Darlington Cleveland Bridge	34	14	6	14	57	64	−7	48	
9	Langley Park	34	11	9	14	53	62	−9	42	
10	Ashington	34	11	7	16	59	58	+1	40	
11	Esh Winning	34	12	6	16	46	64	−18	42	
12	Northallerton Town	34	11	5	18	44	71	−27	38	
13	Norton & Stockton Ancients	34	7	7	20	34	69	−35	28	
14	Alnwick Town	34	6	8	20	42	78	−36	26	
15	Evenwood Town	34	7	5	22	41	78	−37	26	
16	Darlington reserves	34	6	7	21	49	81	−32	25	
17	West Auckland Town	34	7	3	24	47	88	−41	24	
18	Shotton Comrades	34	4	9	21	37	74	−37	21	

Source: fchd
Rules for classification: 1) points; 2) goal difference; 3) number of goals scored.
