= List of Hinckley United F.C. seasons =

Hinckley United F.C. played in the Non League Pyramid from the formation of the club in 1997 until their final season in 2013–14. This is a list of seasons played by the club in English football.

== Seasons ==
Season	League record									FA Cup	FA Trophy
Season	Division	P	W	D	L	F	A	Pts	Pos	FA Cup	FA Trophy
1997–98	Southern League Midland Division	40	15	11	14	59	56	56	12th	QR4	QR3
1998–99	Southern League Midland Division	42	20	12	10	58	40	72	4th	QR1	R4
1999–2000	Southern League Midland/West Division (Note: In 1999–2000, the Southern Football League regional divisions were restructured and the Midland Division was renamed the Midland/West Division.)	42	25	12	5	89	47	87	3rd	QR3	R2
2000–01	Southern League Midland/West Division	42	30	8	4	102	37	98	1st	QR4	R1
2001–02	Southern League Premier Division	42	14	13	15	64	62	55	12th	R2	R2
2002–03	Southern League Premier Division	42	12	16	14	61	64	52	13th	QR3	R1
2003–04	Southern League Premier Division	42	15	14	13	55	46	59	6th	QR4	R2
2004–05	Conference North (Note: In 2004–05, the Football Conference was restructured to create a second tier of two regional divisions: the Conference North and the Conference South. The top 13 clubs from the previous season in the Southern Football League Premier Division, Isthmian League Premier Division, and Northern Premier League Premier Division qualified for the new Conference regional divisions.)	42	15	11	16	55	62	56	12th	R2	R2
2005–06	Conference North	42	14	16	12	60	55	58	10th	QR2	QR3
2006–07	Conference North	42	19	12	11	68	54	69	4th (Note: Beat Workington 2–1 on aggregate in the semi-final before losing 4–2 to Farsley Celtic in the 2007 Conference North play-off Final.)	QR2	R1
2007–08	Conference North	42	11	12	19	48	69	45	19th	QR3	QR3
2008–09	Conference North	42	16	9	17	56	59	57	10th	QR4	QR3
2009–10	Conference North	40 (Note: In 2009–10, only 40 games were played as opposed to 42, due to the insolvency of Farsley Celtic, whose games were removed from the record.)	16	14	10	60	52	62	7th	R1	R1
2010–11	Conference North	40 (Note: In 2010–11, only 40 games were played as opposed to 42, due to the insolvency of Ilkeston Town, whose games were removed from the record.)	13	7	20	76	76	46	15th	QR3	R1
2011–12	Conference North	42	13	9	20	75	90	48	20th	R1	R2
2012–13	Conference North ↓	42	3	4	35	37	143	7 (Note: Hinckley United were deducted three points on 13 December for failing to pay football creditors, and a further three points on 15 April for failing to fulfil their fixture against Bishop's Stortford on 18 December.)	22nd	QR3	QR3
2013–14	Southern League Premier Division	Record expunged								QR1	QR1
