= Easington Colliery A.F.C. =

Association football club in England

Coordinates: 54.7844°N 1.3284°W

Easington Colliery
- Full name: Easington Colliery Association Football Club
- Nicknames: The Colliery, The Colliers, Green Army
- Founded: 1913
- Ground: Welfare Park, Easington
- Chairman: Paul Adamson
- Manager: Olly Hotchkiss
- League: Northern League Division One
- 2025–26: Northern League Division One, 9th of 19
Home colours

Easington Colliery Association Football Club is a football club based in Easington Colliery, County Durham, England. They are currently members of the Northern League Division One and play at Welfare Park.

== History ==
The club was established in 1913 and joined the Wearside League. After finishing third in their first season, they withdrew from the league during the 1914–15 season. Although they rejoined for the 1915–16 season, they left again at the end of the 1916–17 season. Following the end of World War I, the club entered the league again in 1919 under the name Easington Colliery Welfare. They were runners-up in 1928–29 and won the league the following season. Although they dropped to fifth in 1930–31, they won back-to-back league titles in 1931–32 and 1932–33. However, after finishing bottom of the table in 1936–37, they left the league.

In 1939 Easington rejoined the Wearside League again. After finishing as runners-up in 1946–47, they went on to win back-to-back titles in 1947–48 and 1948–49. In 1955–56 the club reached the first round of the FA Cup for the first time in their history, eventually losing 2–0 at home to Tranmere Rovers in front of a record crowd of 4,500. The club disbanded in 1964, but were reformed in 1973 when they rejoined Wearside League and were runners-up in their first season back in the league. In 1976 they adopted their current name. They joined Division Two of the Northern League in 1985 and were runners-up in their first season in the league, earning promotion to Division One. They were relegated back to Division Two after finishing bottom of Division One in 1989–90, but were promoted to Division One the following season after a third-place finish in Division Two. However, the club were relegated again two seasons later.

In 1995–96 Easington finished third in Division Two, earning promotion back to Division One. They remained in Division One until being relegated at the end of the 2000–01 season. After finishing second-from-bottom of Division Two in 2004–05 the club were relegated to the Premier Division of the Northern Alliance. After two seasons in the Northern Alliance, they transferred to the Wearside League. A second-place finish in 2010–11 saw the club promoted to Division Two of the Northern League, but they were relegated the following season after finishing bottom of Division Two. After winning the Shipowners Cup in 2013–14, beating Ashbrooke Belford House 5–3 in the final, the following season saw them finish as runners-up in the Wearside League, resulting in promotion back to Division Two of the Northern League.

In 2023–24 Easington finished third in Division Two, qualifying for the promotion play-offs. After beating Bedlington Terriers 4–0 in the semi-finals, they defeated Newcastle Blue Star 2–1 in the final to earn promotion to Division One.

== Honours ==
- Wearside League
  - Champions 1929–30, 1931–32, 1932–33, 1947–48, 1948–49
  - League Cup winners 1932–33, 1945–46, 1961–62, 2009–10, 2024–25
  - Monkwearmouth Cup winners 1930–31, 1947–48, 1975–76
  - Sunderland Shipowners Cup winners 1974–75, 1979–80, 2013–14

== Records ==
- Best FA Cup performance: First round, 1955–56
- Best FA Trophy performance: Third qualifying round, 1991–92
- Best FA Vase performance: Fourth round, 1982–83
- Record attendance: 4,500 vs Tranmere Rovers, FA Cup first round, 1955

== See also ==
- Easington Colliery A.F.C. players
- Easington Colliery A.F.C. managers
