= Brandon United F.C. =

Association football club in England

Coordinates: 54.756486°N 1.6287044°W

Brandon United
- Full name: Brandon United Football Club
- Nickname: The Boars
- Founded: 1968
- Ground: Welfare Ground, Brandon
- Chairman: Malcolm Clarke
- League: Wearside League Premier Division
- 2025–26: Wearside League Premier Division, 14th of 16
Home colours	Away colours

Brandon United Football Club is a football club based in Brandon, County Durham, England. They are currently members of the Wearside League Premier Division and play at the Welfare Ground.

== History ==
The club was established in 1968 as Rostrons Football Club, the works team of the waste paper company of the same name. They joined Division Three of the Durham & District Sunday League, winning the division in their first season. They went on to win Division Two the following season, and were promoted to Division One. The mid-1970s saw Brandon win Division One four times in successive seasons between 1973–74 and 1976–77. They also won the Durham Sunday Cup in 1973–74, 1975–76 and 1976–77, as well as the FA Sunday Cup in 1975–76.

In 1977 the club joined the Northern Alliance, winning back-to-back championships in their first two seasons in the league, also winning the League Cup in their first season. Although they only finished fourth in 1979–80, the club entered the FA Cup for the first time, and reached the first round. Drawn at home to Bradford City, the match was moved to Spennymoor United's ground, with Bradford winning 3–0. The season also saw them win the League Cup for a second time.

In the summer of 1980 Brandon left the Northern Alliance to join the Northern Amateur League, but after a single season, they were elected to the Wearside League. Two seasons later, they moved up to Division Two of the Northern League. After finishing fourth in 1983–84, they won the division the following season, and were promoted to the Premier Division. In 1988–89 they reached the first round of the FA Cup again; after drawing 0–0 at Doncaster Rovers, the replay was also played at Doncaster's Belle Vue, with Rovers winning 2–1.

Brandon were relegated to Division Two at the end of the 1993–94 season, but returned to Division One after winning Division Two in 1999–2000. The club were Division One champions in 2002–03, but finished bottom of Division One in 2005–06 and were relegated back to Division Two. After finishing bottom of Division Two in 2023–24 they were relegated to the Premier Division of the Wearside League.

== Honours ==
- Northern League
  - Division One champions 2002–03
  - Division Two champions 1984–85, 1999–2000
- Northern Alliance
  - Champions 1977–78, 1978–79
  - League Cup winners 1977–78, 1979–80
- Sunderland Shipowners Cup
  - Winners 1981–82
- FA Sunday Cup
  - Winners 1975–76
- Durham & District Sunday League
  - Division One champions 1973–74, 1974–75, 1975–76, 1976–77
  - Division Two champions 1969–70
  - Division Three champions 1968–69
- Durham Sunday Cup
  - Winners 1973–74, 1975–76, 1976–77

== Records ==
- Best FA Cup performance: First round, 1979–80, 1988–89
- Best FA Trophy performance: Third qualifying round, 1987–88, 1989–90
- Best FA Vase performance: Quarter-finals, 1982–83, 1983–84
- Record attendance: 2,500, FA Sunday Cup semi-final
- Most appearances: Derek Charlton (1977–1986)
- Most goals: Tommy Holden

== See also ==
- Brandon United F.C. players
