= Bedlington Terriers F.C. =

English football club

Coordinates: 55°7′49.991″N 1°35′11.281″W

Bedlington Terriers
- Full name: Bedlington Terriers Football Club
- Nickname: The Terriers
- Founded: 1949
- Dissolved: 2025
- Ground: Welfare Park, Bedlington
- Capacity: 3,000 (300 seated)
Home colours	Away colours

Bedlington Terriers Football Club was a football club based in Bedlington, Northumberland, England. Established in 1949, the club played at Welfare Park until folding in 2025.

== History ==
The club was established in 1949 as Bedlington Mechanics. They joined the Northumberland Miners Welfare League, and were champions of the North Section in 1951–52. The club subsequently transferred to the Northern Combination, and won the Northumberland Minor Cup in 1953–54. They were Northern Combination champions the following season. They joined the Northern Alliance in 1955, and entered the FA Cup for the first time in 1959.

The club disbanded in 1963, but were reformed as Bedlington Colliery Welfare in 1965, and rejoined the Northern Alliance. They were league champions and League Cup winners in 1966–67, and were runners-up the following season and again in 1969–70 and 1971–72, as well as winning the League Cup again in 1969–70.

After leaving the Northern Alliance at the end of the 1978–79 season, the club spent the 1979–80 season in the Tyneside Amateur League as Bedlington United, before rejoining the Northern Alliance as Bedlington Terriers in 1980. In 1982 they were founder members of the new Division Two of the Northern League. They finished as runners-up in 1984–85, earning promotion to Division One. After finishing as runners-up in their first season in Division One, the following season saw them finish bottom of the table, resulting in relegation back to Division Two.

Bedlington won Division Two in 1993–94, earning promotion to Division One. This started the most successful era in the club's history, as they finished as runners-up in 1995–96, also winning the League Cup and Northumberland Senior Cup. They then won five consecutive league titles between 1997–98 and 2001–02. They also reached the first round of the FA Cup for the first time in 1998–99, and after beating Second Division Colchester United 4–1 in front of a record crowd of 2,400, they progressed to the second round, where they lost 2–0 at Scunthorpe United. The same season saw them reach the final of the FA Vase, eventually losing 1–0 to Tiverton Town at Wembley Stadium. They reached the FA Vase semi-finals again in 2000–01 and 2004–05, but were beaten by Berkhamsted Town and AFC Sudbury respectively. During this period the club also won the Northumberland Senior Cup again in 1997–98, 2001–02 and 2003–04 and the League Cup in 2000–01.

Following their run of league titles, Bedlington finished as runners-up in Division One in 2002–03 and 2005–06, but the club then suffered financial difficulties, finishing third-from-bottom in 2006–07. In 2010 the club received sponsorship from American billionaire Robert E. Rich Jr. after his wife discovered ancestral links to the town and purchased the title Lord of Bedlington. Rich's investment included purchasing a £30,000 electronic scoreboard and laying a new pitch, as well as financing a club tour to the United States, with a friendly match against FC Buffalo styled as the "Lord Bedlington Cup". This led to the BBC broadcasting a programme about the story in 2012 under the title Mr Rich and the Terriers.

In 2015–16 Bedlington finished bottom of Division One and were relegated to Division Two. They finished third in Division Two in 2022–23, qualifying for the promotion play-offs, going on to lose on penalties to Billingham Town in the semi-finals. The club finished fourth the following season before being beaten 4–0 by Easington Colliery in the play-off semi-finals. At the end of the following season the club were demoted to the Premier Division of the Northern Alliance for failing ground grading requirements.

In July 2025 Northumberland County Council recovered ownership of the team's facility, Dr Pit Park Welfare Ground, and effectively locked out the club, stating that the club did not have a lease in place. The adult club subsequently folded in December 2025, with their first team taken over by West Allotment Celtic to act as a new reserve team. The junior Terriers continues to operate, using school pitches.

== Honours ==
- Northern League
  - Division One champions 1997–98, 1998–99, 1999–2000, 2000–01, 2001–02
  - Division Two champions 1993–94
  - League Cup winners 1996–97, 2000–01
- Northern Alliance
  - Champions 1966–67
  - League Cup winners 1966–67, 1969–70
- Northern Combination
  - Champions 1954–55
- Northumberland Miners Welfare League
  - North Section champions 1951–52
- Northumberland Senior Cup
  - Winners 1996–97, 1997–98, 2001–02, 2003–04
- Northumberland Minor Cup
  - Winners 1953–54

== Records ==
- Best FA Cup performance: Second round, 1998–99
- Best FA Trophy performance: Third qualifying round, 1986–87
- Best FA Vase performance: Runners-up, 1998–99
- Record attendance: 2,400 vs Colchester United, FA Cup first round, 1998–99
- Most goals: John Milner

== See also ==
- Bedlington Terriers F.C. players
- Bedlington Terriers F.C. managers
