= Billingham Town F.C. =

Association football club in England

Coordinates: 54°36′7.780″N 1°17′8.452″W

Billingham Town
- Full name: Billingham Town Football Club
- Nickname: Billy Town
- Founded: 1967
- Ground: Bedford Terrace, Billingham
- Capacity: 3,000 (173 seated)
- Chairman: Kevin Close
- Manager: Bobby Coultman
- League: Northern League Division Two
- 2025–26: Northern League Division Two, 11th of 22
Home colours	Away colours

Billingham Town Football Club is a football club based in Billingham, England. They are currently members of the Northern League Division Two and play at Bedford Terrace.

== History ==
The club was established by Tom Donnelly and Robbie Cushley in 1967 as Billingham Social. They joined Division Two of the Stockton & District League in 1968 and went on to win it in their first season. After promotion to Division A, they went on to win the league title three seasons in a row and win the League Cup twice.

In 1974 Billingham joined the Teesside League, which they won in 1978–79. After winning a second title in 1981–82, the club was promoted to the new Division Two of the Northern League and adopted its current name, A fourth-place finish in 1984–85 saw them promoted to Division One, but they were relegated at the end of the following season after finishing bottom of the table.

Following a fourth-place finish in 1987–88, Billingham were promoted back to Division One. Despite finishing fifth in their first season in the new division, they were relegated back to Division Two in 1989–90 after finishing second-from-bottom. They remained in Division Two until promotion back to Division One at the end of the 1996–97 season, which saw them finish as runners-up.

In 2003–04 they won the Durham Challenge Cup, beating Bishop Auckland 2–0 in the final. The 2006–07 season saw them finish as Division One runners-up, with Whitley Bay winning the title on goal difference. The following season they won the League Cup, beating Shildon 2–1 in the final. In 2013–14 the club finished bottom of Division One and were relegated to Division Two. They were Division Two champions in 2018–19, earning promotion back to Division One. They lasted just three years in Division One, the first two of which were ended early due to the COVID-19 pandemic before being relegated back to Division Two at the end of the 2021–22 season. In 2023–23 season the club finished fourth in Division Two, qualifying for the promotion play-offs. After beating Bedlington Terriers 3–2 on penalties in the semi-finals (after a 2–2 draw), they lost the final 5–4 on penalties to Birtley Town following another 2–2 draw.

== Ground ==
The club initially played at Mill Lane, which had sloped to the extent that the crossbar was level with the top of one of the corner flags. They moved to Bedford Terrace in 1981, with floodlights installed in 1992–93. Hartlepool United funded the laying of a new pitch in 2007 in order to play their reserve matches at the ground. The ground has a capacity of 3,000, of which 176 is seated and 600 covered. The record attendance of 1,500 was set for an FA Youth Cup game against Manchester City match in 1985.

== Honours ==
- Northern League
  - Division Two champions 2018–19
  - League Cup winners 2007–08
- Teesside League
  - Champions 1978–79, 1981–82
- Stockton & District League
  - Division Two champions 1968–69
- Durham Challenge Cup
  - Winners 2003–04
- Durham Amateur Cup
  - Winners 1975–76

== Records ==
- Best FA Cup performance: Fourth qualifying round, 2000–01
- Best FA Trophy performance: First qualifying round, 1985–86, 1986–87, 1989–90
- Best FA Vase performance: Fifth round, 1997–98
- Record attendance: 1,500 vs Manchester City, FA Youth Cup, 1985
- Most appearances: Paul Rowntree, 505
- Most goals: Paul Rowntree, 396

== See also ==
- Billingham Town F.C. players
- Billingham Town F.C. managers
