= Seaham Red Star F.C. =

Association football club in England

Coordinates: 54°50′36.49″N 1°21′49.99″W

- Full name: Seaham Red Star Football Club
- Nickname: The Star
- Founded: 1973
- Ground: Alexandra Steakhouse, Stadium [Sunderland]
- Chairman: John Allan
- Manager: David A (King of Seaham)
- League: Northern League Division Two
- 2025–26: Northern League Division Two, 5th of 22
Home colours	Away colours

Seaham Red Star Football Club is a football club based in Seaham, England. They joined the Wearside League in 1979 as Seaham Colliery Welfare Red Star. In the 1978–79 season, they reached the 5th round of the FA Vase. In 1984, they changed to their present name. For the 2014–15 season, they are members of Northern League Division Two. Seaham were confirmed second division champions on 28 March 2015 and will return to Division One for the 2015–16 season. The club has a focus on producing local players and providing a platform for talented local players to play Northern League football.

== History ==
=== Formation ===
Seaham Red Star are named after the pub in which they were formed. A Sunday morning side in 1973, they are now widely regarded as one of the Northern League's leading clubs.

Much of the credit for the club's early development belongs to Ralph Pigg, the initial Secretary, and Larry Phillips, the club's first Manager. The pair, supported by a small committee, entered a side in the Houghton and District League and, after a promising first season, made a successful application to join the Northern Alliance League in 1974. After a further five fairly successful seasons, the Club felt sufficiently confident to join the then highly competitive Wearside League in 1979. This confidence was soon justified, the Club winning the Durham Challenge Cup in 1980 and the League and League Cup "double" in 1981–82. In 1983, they were elected to the Northern League Second Division and, after some near misses, eventually gained promotion to the First Division in the 1987–88 season.

=== 1980s and 1990s ===
Bryan Mayhew took over as Chairman of the Club in 1986 and, with able support from former Secretaries, Harry Hobson and John McBeth and a small hardworking committee – in particular Reg Atkinson, Dave Copeland, Jim Ferguson and John Smith – the Club enjoyed First Division status for an unbroken fourteen seasons. Notable successes during this period, included finishing third in 1993–94, winning the League Cup in 1992–93 and, after leading the table for most of the season, finishing second in 1999–00. Mayhew was also a prime mover in getting the League to join the National Pyramid, calling the Special General Meeting of clubs which eventually led to the historic decision being made.

Just two years after finishing runners-up in the First Division, the Club suffered its first ever relegation in its near thirty years history. Even worse was to follow when, as a result of dwindling committee support, officials took the reluctant step of tendering the club's resignation from the League.

However, following a positive response from a number of local people keen to see the Club continue, a new committee was formed under the chairmanship of John Smith and the resignation was withdrawn.

=== 2000s ===
The club's re-introduction to Division Two at the start of 2002–03 got off to an unpromising start but, after bringing in Neil Hixon as Manager, the Star failed by the narrowest of margins to gain an immediate return to Division One. Unfortunately for the club, Neil's achievements resulted in him being snapped up by Durham City shortly after the start of last season, effectively putting our promotion aspirations on hold for at least another year. However, with experienced Northern League manager Peter Mulcaster steadying the ship, the Club finished in a respectable mid-table position.

Neil Hixon returned as manager in 2005 and along with Stuart Gooden and former Sunderland & Scottish International George Herd put together a side that won promotion back to the First Division in the 2006–07 season. The following season Hixon & Herd moved to Sunderland RCA and Gooden took over the team which finished in a creditable 8th place in the table. The following season saw yet another change in management with former Darlington player Andy Toman taking over. Another dip in club fortunes saw the side face relegation.

=== 2010s ===
The 2010–11 and 2011–12 were two of the worst seasons in the Red Star history with the team involved in relegation battles which could have seen the club relegated to the Wearside League, both battles were successful and the club retained its Northern League status.

In May 2012, the club appointed Mark Collingwood and Simon Johnson, who achieved great success in the Northern Alliance League with Hebburn Reyrolle, Johnson resigned at the end of the 2013–14 season and was replaced by Chris McCabe who was appointed Assistant/Player manager.

2014–15 was a successful season for The Star as they won the Division Two title.

2016–17 Chris McCabe replaced Mark Collingwood as Manager. 2017/18 Mark Collingwood returns as 1st team manager

== Honours ==
- 1979 Phillips Floodlit Trophy
- 1980 Durham Challenge Cup Winners
- 1980 Monkwearmouth Challenge Cup Runners-up
- 1982 Wearside League Champions
- 1982 Wearsisde League Cup Winners
- 1988 Northern League Division Two Runners-up
- 1993 Northern League Cup winners
- 1993 J.R.Cleator Cup Runners-up
- 2000 Northern League Division One Runners-up
- 2007 Northern League Division Two Runners-up
- 2015 Northern League Division Two Winners

== Notable former players ==
- Nigel Gleghorn
- Steve Harper
- Lee Howey
- David Rush
- Jordan Hugill
- Tony Cullen
