= Peterlee Town F.C. =

Coordinates: 54.75135°N 1.34114°W

Peterlee Town FC
- Full name: Peterlee Town Football Club
- Founded: 1976
- Ground: Helford Road, Peterlee
- Chairman: Jan Thirlaway
- Manager: Michael Eggleston
- League: Wearside League Division Two
Home colours

Peterlee Town F.C. are a football club from Peterlee, England. They are currently members of the Wearside League Division Two and play at Helford Road.

== History ==
The club was formed in 1976 as Peterlee Newtown FC and three years after forming they joined the Wearside League and played in that league until 1982 when they finished runners-up, joining the newly expanded Northern League in Division Two winning the Second Division Championship at the first attempt and were promoted to Division One. In the next few years, they had a yo-yo existence between the two divisions, gaining a further three promotions to Division One. In 1985–86 they reached the 4th qualifying round of the FA Cup, losing in the replay to Whitby Town. After their relegation from the top division in 2004–05, the team finished at the bottom of Division Two in 2005–06 and were relegated to the Northern Alliance.

In 2006 the club changed its name to Peterlee Town F.C.

In September 2008 Peterlee beat Billingham Town 2–0 in the second round qualifying of the FA Vase at the Eden Lane Ground. This win saw them play Newcastle Benfield in the first round proper of the competition where they lost 4–1.

In 2011 they club rejoined the Wearside League with the club stating on their website that this has "helped attract more local talent and will almost certainly help Peterlee move back into the Northern League within the next few years." However, they left the league after two seasons.

In 2022 the club reformed as Peterlee Town FC with two junior teams competing in the Russel Foster Youth League. As of the 2024-2025 Season the club maintains 16 teams with a mixture of girls, boys and adult teams.

== Honours ==
- Northern League
  - Division Two champions 1982–83

== Records ==
- Best FA Cup performance: Fourth qualifying round, 1985–86
- Best FA Trophy performance: Second qualifying round, 1984–85, 1992–93
- Best FA Vase performance: Third round, 1981–82, 1982–83, 1989–90
