= Sunderland Ryhope Community Association F.C. =

Association football club in England

Coordinates: 54°52′02″N 1°22′06″W

Sunderland Ryhope Community Association
- Full name: Sunderland Ryhope Community Association Football Club
- Founded: 1963; 63 years ago (as Ryhope Youth Club)
- Ground: Meadow Park; Ryhope; Sunderland
- Capacity: 1,500
- Manager: Mark Forrest
- League: Northern League Division Two
- 2025–26: Northern League Division Two, 14th of 22
| Home colours | Away colours |

Sunderland Ryhope Community Association Football Club is an English association football club, based in Ryhope, Sunderland, Tyne and Wear, currently playing in the Northern League Division Two.

== History ==
Sunderland RCA FC started its life as Ryhope Youth Club FC. Its first season was in the Seaham & District League in 1963. The first game was against Seaham UDC at the Seaham CW ground, now home to Seaham Red Star, and it was a 3–3 draw. The first seeds had been sown three years earlier, in 1960, when the Ryhope Youth Club Centre opened in the Welfare Hall.

In 1965 the club moved to the Colliery Welfare ground and in 1971 changed its name to Ryhope Community Association. Competing in the Seaham, then Houghton & District Leagues, the club had nine cup wins and four league titles.

Rejected by the Wearside League because a Ryhope team already played in it, the club folded after the 1974–75 season. Re-formed three years later, the club joined the Northern Alliance in 1978 and won the League Challenge Cup at St James Park in Newcastle, in only their third season. Ryhope CA were also league runners up that year, even though they were reduced to playing on a school field.

After some persuasion, the club convinced the council to lease then some derelict land - Meadow Park was underway. Financial help was obtained from Sunderland and Tyne and Wear Councils and the Sports Council to build a football ground. The club members and community joined to carry out the building work, resulting in the enclosed ground.

In 1982 the club was a founder member of the Northern League Second Division, achieving promotion as runner up in the 1983–84 season. Despite achieving a league placing of tenth the next season, survival proved difficult and the club was relegated in 1988.

In 1999 a new era commenced with the amalgamation with Kennek Roker of the Wearside League to form Kennek Ryhope Community Association. The seasons from 2003 onwards were tough, but for the season 2006–07, the club joined forces with Springboard Sunderland and a new era as Sunderland RCA FC began.

Progress continued to be made both on and off the pitch and after finishing fourth in the previous two seasons Sunderland RCA FC were promoted as runners-up to Stokesley FC in season 2009–10.

== Club records ==
- Best league performance: 4th in Northern League Division One, 2011–12
- Best FA Cup performance: Third qualifying round, 1984–85, 1997–98
- Best FA Trophy performance: First round, 1985–86
- Best FA Vase performance: Fourth round, 2018–19

== Honours ==
- Northern League Division 2 Runners-Up 1983–84, 2009–10
- Northern Alliance Runners-Up 1980–81
- Northern Alliance Cup Winners 1980–81
