= Northumberland Football Association =

County sport governing body in Northern England

- Formation: 1883
- Headquarters: Whitley Park; Whitley Road
- Location: Newcastle-upon-Tyne NE12 9FA
- Region served: Northumberland
- Chief Executive: Andrew Rose-Cook
- Website: www.northumberlandfa.com

The Northumberland Football Association is a governing body in the historic county of Northumberland, England. The association was formed in 1883. It is responsible for the governance and development of football at all levels in the county.

== History ==
In 1879 the joint Durham and Northumberland Football Association was founded and they stayed that way until 1883 when increasing numbers and travel problems necessitated a change. On 11 May 1883, 40 clubs met in the Alexandra Hotel in Newcastle and voted to form an independent body known as the Northumberland Football Association with the brief of 'using their influence to encourage new clubs to take up the game in their area'. At a subsequent meeting in September of the same year, Mr Robinson reported that he had managed to get the accounts in order and a loss of some four pounds would be divided between the two Counties. It was also agreed to pay Durham £15 for the existing Challenge Cup.

The first secretary of Northumberland Football Association was Aleck Peters and the Lord Bishop of Newcastle was the County FA's first President. Prominent clubs in the late 1800s were Tyne Association, Newcastle Rangers, Newcastle East End and Newcastle West End.

The Northern Football Association was formed as a rival to the Northumberland FA by 'country clubs' who saw the parent body as Tyneside-centric in 1888. The venture was short lived as the NFA talked the FA in London into not recognising the Northern as an official organisation, and it was strangled after just a couple of years of existence.

The rebel clubs that formed the Morpeth-based Northern Association included Amble, Burradon, Bedlington East End, Horncliffe, Berwick Rangers, Tweedside Wanderers, Newsham, Backworth, Broomhill, Warkworth, Blyth, Seaside Rovers, Morpeth Athletic, Weetslade, Longhirst, Spittal, Belford, Stobswood, Seaton Burn and the senior sides Morpeth Harriers and Shankhouse Black Watch. Ashington joined the rebels following season.

As the new Millennium arrived Northumberland FA became a Limited Company and in 2002–03 there was a move into their own new premises at Whitley Park with a County Ground included.

== Organisation ==
The Association provides the appropriate structures and systems to enable the organisation to control, manage, regulate and promote the game within the county.

The Football Development Team assist in all aspects of football development ranging from support for Charter Standard Clubs to assistance with funding applications to further club/school development.

== Affiliated leagues ==
=== Men's saturday leagues ===
- Northern Football Alliance
- Newcastle Corinthians League
- North Northumberland League
- North East Christian Fellowship League
- Tyneside Amateur League

=== Men's sunday leagues ===
- Blyth and Wansbeck Sunday League
- Cramlington and District Sunday League
- Hexham and District Sunday League
- Newcastle Central Sunday Afternoon League
- Northumberland U21 League

=== Other men's leagues ===
- Newcastle Business League
- Newcastle University Business League
- Friday Night Elevens League

=== Ladies and girls leagues ===
- Northumberland County Women's Football League
- Northumberland Girls Football League

=== Youth leagues ===
- Pinpoint Recruitment Jnr. Football League
- Northumberland Youth League
- Glendale League (Youth)
- Newcastle Mini Soccer League
- Northumberland Mini Soccer League.
- Tynedale Mini Soccer League

=== Small sided leagues ===
- Champion Soccer – Gosforth
- Newcastle Futsal League - Walker
- Power League – North Shields
- SoccerWorld Newcastle

== Disbanded or amalgamated leagues ==
Leagues that were affiliated to the Northumberland FA but have disbanded or amalgamated with other leagues include:

- Ashington & District League
- Blyth and District League
- Coast Colts Junior Football League
- Coquetdale League
- East and West Tyne League
- East Northumberland League
- Hexham and District League Amalgamated with the North Tyne league in 1971 to become The Hexham & North Tyne League which ceased to exist in 1999.
- Mid-Tyne Amateur League
- NEL-Tyneside Combination
- Newcastle and District Trader league (later known as the Newcastle Business Houses League)
- Newcastle and District United League
- Northern Combination
- North Eastern Amateur league (founded in 1923 and now amalgamated with Tyneside Amateur League)
- South East Northumberland League (founded in 1921 and eventually incorporated in Tyneside Amateur League)
- Tyneside League
- Tyneside Munition Workers League (also known as the Tyneside Munitioneers' League)
- Tyneside Works League
- United Free Churches League

== Affiliated member clubs ==
Among the notable clubs that are (or at one time were) affiliated to the Northumberland FA are:

- Alnwick Town
- Ashington
- Bedlington Terriers
- Blyth Spartans
- Morpeth Town
- Newcastle Benfield
- Newcastle Blue Star (now defunct)
- Newcastle East End (became NUFC)
- Newcastle West End (became NUFC)
- Newcastle United
- North Shields
- Ponteland United
- Prudhoe Town
- Ryton & Crawcrook Albion
- Shankhouse
- Team Northumbria (now defunct)
- Walker Celtic (now defunct)
- West Allotment Celtic
- Whitley Bay

== County Cup competitions ==
The Northumberland FA run the following Cup Competitions:

- Northumberland Senior Cup
- Northumberland Senior Benevolent Bowl
- Northumberland Minor Cup
- Northumberland Junior Cup
- Northumberland Women's Cup
- Northumberland Sunday Cup
- Northumberland Sunday Minor Cup
- Northumberland Sunday Junior Cup
- Northumberland Tesco Girls U14 Cup
- Northumberland Tesco Girls U16 Cup
- Northumberland Rangers Cup
- Northumberland Colts Cup
- Northumberland Tesco Cup
- Northumberland Cubs Cup
- Northumberland Divisional Cup

== Senior Cup ==
The Northumberland Senior Cup is a county cup competition involving teams within the Northumberland Football Association.

== List of recent Northumberland Cup winners ==
Season	Northumberland Senior Cup	Northumberland Senior Benevolent Bowl	Northumberland Minor Cup	Northumberland Junior Cup	Northumberland Women's Cup
2004-05		Ponteland United			
2005-06	Newcastle United Reserves	Seaton Delaval Amateurs			
2006-07	Morpeth Town	Wallsend	Amble United		Newcastle United Women Reserves
2007-08	Newcastle United Reserves	Blyth Town	Shilbottle Colliery Welfare	New Hartley Juniors U18	Newcastle United Women
2008-09	Newcastle United Reserves	Blyth Town	Blakelaw	New Hartley Juniors U18	Blyth Spartans Ladies
2009-10	Whitley Bay	Alnwick Town	Morpeth Sporting Club	New Hartley Juniors U18	Whitley Bay Women
2010-11	Newcastle United Reserves	Percy Main Amateurs	Whitley Bay 'A'	New Hartley Juniors U18	Whitley Bay Women
2011-12	Newcastle United Reserves	Killingworth Town	Wallington FC	New Hartley Juniors U18	Newcastle United Women
2012-13	Ashington A.F.C	Heaton Stannington F.C	Red House Farm	New Hartley Juniors U18	Newcastle United Women Reserves
2013-14	Newcastle United Reserves	Killingworth Town	AFC Newbiggin	Wallsend Boys Club U18	Tynedale Ladies F.C
2014-15	Blyth Spartans AFC	Wallington FC	Newcastle University	Newcastle Benfield Juniors U18	Whitley Bay FC Women
2015-16	North Shields FC	Whitley Bay 'A'	Ponteland United	New Hartley Juniors U18	Blyth Town Ladies
2016-17	Blyth Spartans AFC	Shankhouse FC	Hazlerigg Victory FC		Wallsend Boys Club Ladies

A full record of the Northumberland FA Cup competitions is available in the book Howay the Lads.

== Board & council members ==
=== Board members ===
- Steve Ord (President)
- Derek Booth (Vice President)
- Frank Scantlebury (Vice President)
- Andrew Rose-Cook (Acting Chief Executive)
- Lauri Chandler (Finance Director)
- Wilton Holmes (Director)
- Paul Nesbitt (Director)
- Alistar Jenkins (Director)

=== Members of council ===
- Syd Johnson (Life Vice President)
- Derek Booth (Vice President)
- Alex Smailes (Vice President)
- Frank Scantlebury (Vice President)
- George Watson (Honorary Life Member)
- David Tiffin (Honorary Life Member)
- Derek Breakwell (Northern League)
- George Penman (Northern Football Alliance)
- Steve Swinbank (North East Combination League)
- Fiona Robson (Northumberland County Women's League
- Graham Smith (North East Sunday League)
- Lee Scott (Pinpoint Recruitment Junior Leagues)
- Gary Trewick (Pinpoint Recruitment Junior Leagues)
- Louis Storey (Youth Football Development League)
- Stew Pringle (Cramlington Sunday League)
- Paul Nesbitt (Hexham and District Sunday Football League)
- Wilton Holmes (Tynedale Mini Soccer League)
- Colin Douglas (Blyth Sunday League)
- Chris Flynn (Independent Board Member)
- Alistair Jenkins (Independent Board Member)
- Richie Hines (Newcastle United)
- Jonathan Gray (Referee Association)
- Jess Callaghan (IAG)

== Key staff ==
Key Staff Members
- Andrew Rose-Cook (Acting Chief Executive)
- David Jones (Head of Participation)
- Angela Barber (Head of Compliance)
- Lynn Barber (Head of Administration)
- Vacant (Head of Quality)
- Kevin Azzopardi (Referee Development Officer)
- Helen Beales (Marketing & Communications Officer)
