= 1988–89 Northern Football League =

The 1988–89 Northern Football League season was the 91st in the history of Northern Football League, a football competition in England.

== Division One ==
Northern Football League Division One
- Season: 1988–89
- Champions: Billingham Synthonia
- Relegated: Chester-le-Street Town; Crook Town
- Matches: 380
- Goals: 1,126 (2.96 per match)

Division One featured 16 clubs which competed in the division last season, along with four new clubs, promoted from Division Two:

- Billingham Town
- Durham City
- Seaham Red Star
- Stockton

=== League table ===
Pos	Team	Pld	W	D	L	GF	GA	GD	Pts	Promotion or relegation
1	Billingham Synthonia	38	26	6	6	83	34	+49	84	
2	Tow Law Town	38	23	8	7	74	45	+29	77	
3	Gretna	38	22	7	9	80	37	+43	73	
4	Guisborough Town	38	21	9	8	74	37	+37	72	
5	Billingham Town	38	20	4	14	59	47	+12	64	
6	Newcastle Blue Star	38	17	10	11	61	38	+23	61	
7	Brandon United	38	15	8	15	50	60	−10	53	
8	Ferryhill Athletic	38	15	7	16	72	65	+7	52	
9	Blyth Spartans	38	13	13	12	51	50	+1	52	
10	Stockton	38	15	7	16	58	63	−5	52	
11	Spennymoor United	38	14	9	15	47	60	−13	51	
12	Whitby Town	38	13	9	16	56	52	+4	48	
13	Easington Colliery	38	12	11	15	51	57	−6	47	
14	Durham City	38	11	13	14	41	42	−1	46	
15	South Bank	38	12	10	16	46	58	−12	46	
16	Seaham Red Star	38	12	8	18	50	67	−17	44	
17	Shildon	38	9	11	18	50	88	−38	38	
18	North Shields	38	10	6	22	56	77	−21	36	Transferred to the Northern Counties East League
19	Chester-le-Street Town	38	6	14	18	35	60	−25	32	Relegated to Division Two
20	Crook Town	38	5	8	25	32	89	−57	20 (Note: Crook Town were deducted three points.)	Relegated to Division Two

Source: fchd
Rules for classification: 1) points; 2) goal difference; 3) number of goals scored.

== Division Two ==
Northern Football League Division Two
- Season: 1988–89
- Champions: Consett
- Promoted: Consett; Alnwick Town; Whickham
- Matches: 380
- Goals: 1,245 (3.28 per match)

Division Two featured 14 clubs which competed in the division last season, along with six new clubs.

- Clubs relegated from Division One:
  - Consett
  - Ryhope Community
- Clubs joined from the Wearside Football League:
  - Murton
  - Washington
  - Whickham
- Plus:
  - Prudhoe East End, joined from the Northern Football Alliance

=== League table ===
Pos	Team	Pld	W	D	L	GF	GA	GD	Pts	Promotion or relegation
1	Consett	38	30	3	5	89	32	+57	93	Promoted to Division One
2	Alnwick Town	38	25	9	4	92	36	+56	84	Promoted to Division One
3	Whickham	38	26	6	6	88	38	+50	84	Promoted to Division One
4	Prudhoe East End	38	24	6	8	68	32	+36	78	
5	Ashington	38	21	5	12	79	52	+27	68	
6	Peterlee Newtown	38	20	7	11	70	53	+17	67	
7	Bedlington Terriers	38	16	7	15	63	50	+13	55	
8	Horden Colliery Welfare	38	15	10	13	57	58	−1	55	
9	Northallerton Town	38	13	15	10	62	38	+24	51 (Note: Northallerton Town were deducted three points.)	
10	Ryhope Community	38	13	11	14	67	60	+7	50	
11	Murton	38	14	8	16	65	62	+3	50	
12	West Auckland Town	38	12	11	15	66	72	−6	47	
13	Langley Park	38	13	6	19	58	72	−14	42 (Note: Langley Park were deducted three points.)	
14	Norton & Stockton Ancients	38	11	7	20	52	72	−20	40	
15	Esh Winning	38	10	8	20	42	68	−26	38	
16	Darlington Cleveland Bridge	38	10	8	20	49	83	−34	38	
17	Evenwood Town	38	8	8	22	53	100	−47	32	
18	Washington	38	8	6	24	50	87	−37	30	
19	Willington	38	8	6	24	43	97	−54	30	
20	Shotton Comrades	38	5	9	24	32	83	−51	24	

Source: fchd
Rules for classification: 1) points; 2) goal difference; 3) number of goals scored.
