= 1989–90 Northern Football League =

The 1989–90 Northern Football League season was the 92nd in the history of Northern Football League, a football competition in England.

== Division One ==
Northern Football League Division One
- Season: 1989–90
- Champions: Billingham Synthonia
- Relegated: Billingham Town; Easington Colliery
- Matches: 380
- Goals: 1,221 (3.21 per match)

Division One featured 17 clubs which competed in the division last season, along with three new clubs, promoted from Division Two:

- Alnwick Town
- Consett
- Whickham

=== League table ===
Pos	Team	Pld	W	D	L	GF	GA	GD	Pts	Promotion or relegation
1	Billingham Synthonia	38	29	4	5	87	35	+52	91	
2	Gretna	38	23	6	9	79	44	+35	75	
3	Tow Law Town	38	22	7	9	78	57	+21	73	
4	Newcastle Blue Star	38	19	10	9	77	48	+29	67	
5	Stockton	38	18	8	12	73	64	+9	62	
6	Consett	38	16	9	13	57	61	−4	57	
7	Guisborough Town	38	16	8	14	59	46	+13	56	
8	Alnwick Town	38	16	6	16	59	54	+5	54	
9	Blyth Spartans	38	15	8	15	58	58	0	53	
10	Seaham Red Star	38	15	7	16	62	66	−4	52	
11	Spennymoor United	38	14	8	16	58	53	+5	50	Transferred to the Northern Counties East League
12	Whitby Town	38	15	8	15	74	73	+1	50 (Note: Whitby Town were deducted three points.)	
13	Ferryhill Athletic	38	14	4	20	63	79	−16	46	
14	Shildon	38	12	10	16	58	75	−17	46	
15	Whickham	38	11	7	20	48	69	−21	40	
16	South Bank	38	10	10	18	40	65	−25	40	
17	Durham City	38	9	12	17	64	77	−13	39	
18	Brandon United	38	9	12	17	46	60	−14	39	
19	Billingham Town	38	10	9	19	52	67	−15	39	Relegated to Division Two
20	Easington Colliery	38	6	9	23	29	70	−41	27	Relegated to Division Two

Source: fchd
Rules for classification: 1) points; 2) goal difference; 3) number of goals scored.

== Division Two ==
Northern Football League Division Two
- Season: 1989–90
- Champions: Murton
- Promoted: Murton; Northallerton Town; Peterlee Newtown
- Matches: 380
- Goals: 1,189 (3.13 per match)

Division Two featured 17 clubs which competed in the division last season, along with three new clubs.

- Clubs relegated from Division One:
  - Chester-le-Street Town
  - Crook Town
- Plus:
  - Hebburn, joined from the Wearside Football League

=== League table ===
Pos	Team	Pld	W	D	L	GF	GA	GD	Pts	Promotion or relegation
1	Murton	38	27	8	3	86	33	+53	89	Promoted to Division One
2	Northallerton Town	38	26	9	3	82	32	+50	87	Promoted to Division One
3	Peterlee Newtown	38	24	10	4	71	24	+47	82	Promoted to Division One
4	Langley Park	38	24	8	6	67	35	+32	80	
5	Chester-le-Street Town	38	23	8	7	62	34	+28	77	
6	Crook Town	38	20	7	11	70	45	+25	67	
7	Evenwood Town	38	19	8	11	77	52	+25	65	
8	Prudhoe East End	38	17	10	11	63	49	+14	61	
9	Bedlington Terriers	38	17	5	16	67	72	−5	56	
10	Washington	38	16	4	18	50	58	−8	52	
11	Ryhope Community	38	14	6	18	68	67	+1	48	
12	Darlington Cleveland Bridge	38	13	7	18	45	72	−27	43 (Note: Darlington Cleveland Bridge were deducted three points.)	
13	Ashington	38	10	6	22	62	85	−23	36	
14	Willington	38	10	5	23	51	86	−35	35	
15	Hebburn	38	8	8	22	56	76	−20	32	
16	Horden Colliery Welfare	38	8	8	22	34	66	−32	32	
17	Shotton Comrades	38	8	10	20	51	69	−18	31 (Note: Shotton Comrades were deducted three points.)	
18	Norton & Stockton Ancients	38	7	9	22	43	71	−28	30	
19	West Auckland Town	38	5	13	20	43	72	−29	28	
20	Esh Winning	38	7	5	26	41	91	−50	23 (Note: Esh Winning were deducted three points.)	

Source: fchd
Rules for classification: 1) points; 2) goal difference; 3) number of goals scored.
