= Wallsend F.C. =

Wallsend
- Full name: Wallsend Football Club
- Founded: 1890 as Wallsend Park Villa
- Dissolved: 1937
- Ground: Old Cycling Ground/North Road Ground
- 1932–33: North-Eastern League Div.1, 20th
Home colours

Wallsend F.C. was an English association football club based in the town of Wallsend, Northumberland.

== History ==
The club was founded in 1890 under the name Wallsend Park Villa. The team won the Gateshead Cup in 1893–94 and again the following season when they combined it with victory in the Northumberland Junior League. Until then, the team had played on open grounds, but an arrangement was made to rent the Wallsend Amateur Bicycle Club's enclosure. The club was afforded senior status in 1895, and joined the Tyneside League. The team played in both the FA Cup and the FA Amateur Cup for the first time in 1896. They lost to Leadgate Exiles in the preliminary round of the FA Cup, and in the Amateur Cup, received a bye in the first qualifying round and beat Rutherford College in the second before being eliminated by Shankhouse in the third. They also reached the final of the Northumberland Senior Cup, losing to Willington Athletic; they were to win the trophy for the first and only time in 1901–02.

Wallsend were admitted to the Northern Alliance when Southwick resigned just before the 1896–97 season was due to start. They lost their first match 8–1, but recovered to finish third. They continued in the top half of the table, building up to a runners-up place in 1902–03 and winning the league title the following season. After four more seasons, which included another runners-up finish, in 1906–07, Wallsend joined the North Eastern League. They began with three mid-table finishes, but then slumped to 18th of 19 in 1911–12. A change of name, to plain Wallsend F.C., preceded a return to mid-table, but they finished bottom of the league in the two seasons before competition was abandoned for the duration of the First World War.

In the six seasons after the war, Wallsend's best placing was 15th of 20, although they did reach the fifth qualifying round of the FA Cup on three occasions. After finishing bottom in 1924–25, having conceded more than 100 goals in 38 matches, they left the North Eastern League and joined the Northern Alliance, only to return a season later, as the Alliance was absorbed into the North Eastern League as its second division. Wallsend were promoted as runners-up to Washington Colliery in 1927–28.

Tragedy struck the club in the 1931 close season, when inside forward, John Wynn, formerly of Cardiff City F.C., died aged 27, after being hit in the chest by a cricket ball, when playing in a friendly match.

After four seasons in mid-table at the higher level, they finished bottom in 1932–33 and were relegated, at which point the shareholders decided that the club, which had a deficit of £732, should be voluntarily wound up.

A successor club, formed shortly afterwards under the name of Wallsend Town A.F.C., also struggled financially. The team spent two seasons in the North Eastern League Second Division, then returned for one season to the re-formed Northern Alliance, in which they finished 10th of 12. The Club finally went under in 1937.

== Colours ==
The club wore originally wore red and white stripes, changing in the 1910s to red jerseys, with a white change kit.

== Ground ==
The club played at the Old Cycling Ground and the North Road Ground, which is now the site of the Lindisfarne Social Club and private housing.

== Players who played Professional ==
Name	Club Played For	First Played Professional
Archie Mowatt	Newcastle United F.C.	1891
W. Inneard	Newcastle United F.C	1900
Joe McClarence	Newcastle United F.C	1904
Tommy Lowes	Newcastle United F.C	1910
S. Barber	Newcastle United F.C	1925
Tom Hughes	Newcastle United F.C	1912
James Wynn	Rochdale	1936
Tommy Winship	Arsenal	1910

== League participation ==
- 1895–1897: Tyneside League
- 1897–1908: Northern Football Alliance
- 1908–1925: North-Eastern League
- 1925–1926: Northern Football Alliance
- 1926–1928: North-Eastern League Div 2
- 1928–1933: North-Eastern League Div 1
- 1933–1935: North-Eastern League Div 2
- 1935–1936: Northern Football Alliance

== Records ==
FA Cup

- Fifth Qualifying Round: 1903–04

Northumberland Senior Cup

- Winners: 1901/02
- Runners Up: 1896/97, 1904/05, 1906/07, 1928/29, 1929/30
