= Stan Alexander =

English footballer

Personal information
- Full name: Stanley Alexander
- Date of birth: 17 September 1905
- Place of birth: Percy Main, North Tyneside, England
- Date of death: 5 June 1961 (aged 55)
- Place of death: Kingston upon Hull, England
- Height: 5 ft 9 in (1.75 m)
- Position: Inside forward

Senior career*
Years	Team	Apps	(Gls)
1921–1926	Percy Main Amateurs	?	(?)
1926–1931	Hull City	98	(41)
1931–1933	Bradford City	61	(23)
1933–1935	Millwall	88	(11)
1936	Tottenham Hotspur	9	(1)
1938	Accrington Stanley	22	(2)
- * Club domestic league appearances and goals

Stanley Alexander (17 September 1905 – 5 June 1961) was a professional footballer who played as inside forward. He was born in Percy Main, North Tyneside, England.

The Hull Daily Mail reported "A third addition to the City playing ranks is Stanley Alexander, a 19 year old inside right from the Percy Main club. Alexander, who is an English schoolboy international, weighs 10 1/2 stone and stands 5ft. 9in. The boy is well recommended and was anxious to join his former club companion, Charlie Lloyd, a full back, who joined Hull City at the end of last season and has been retained."

The match report by "Veritas" on Hull City's 4–2 win over Reading, describes Alexander, who scored twice, taking his season's tally to eleven league and four cup goals, as of considerable value and a nugget that is paying for being polished up.

Stan Alexander, inside forward of Percy Main, who has been with Tottenham Hotspur during the last two seasons, has signed on for Accrington Stanley. Starting with Percy Main Amateurs F.C., Alexander had spells with Hull City and Bradford City before joining Millwall in September 1933. In June 1936 he was transferred from Millwall to Tottenham Hotspur.

Alexander's activity benefitted the clubs:

- Percy Main Amateurs,
- Hull City,
- Bradford City where he scored 23 goals in 61 games,
- Millwall,
- Tottenham Hotspur in London;
- Accrington Stanley in the region of North West England
