= 1990–91 Northern Football League =

The 1990–91 Northern Football League season was the 93rd in the history of Northern Football League, a football competition in England.

== Division One ==
Northern Football League Division One
- Season: 1990–91
- Champions: Gretna
- Relegated: Stockton; Alnwick Town; Durham City
- Matches: 380
- Goals: 1,131 (2.98 per match)

Division One featured 17 clubs which competed in the division last season, along with three new clubs, promoted from Division Two:

- Murton
- Northallerton Town
- Peterlee Newtown

=== League table ===
Pos	Team	Pld	W	D	L	GF	GA	GD	Pts	Promotion or relegation
1	Gretna	38	30	5	3	86	23	+63	95	
2	Guisborough Town	38	21	12	5	79	43	+36	75	
3	Blyth Spartans	38	20	8	10	80	50	+30	68	
4	Billingham Synthonia	38	20	8	10	72	43	+29	68	
5	Consett	38	19	11	8	67	43	+24	68	
6	Whitby Town	38	16	13	9	66	49	+17	61	
7	Tow Law Town	38	16	10	12	65	64	+1	58	
8	Ferryhill Athletic	38	16	9	13	55	50	+5	54 (Note: Ferryhill Athletic were deducted three points.)	
9	Northallerton Town	38	14	11	13	50	46	+4	53	
10	Newcastle Blue Star	38	13	13	12	59	48	+11	52	
11	Seaham Red Star	38	12	12	14	44	46	−2	48	
12	South Bank	38	9	16	13	40	43	−3	43	
13	Murton	38	10	11	17	47	59	−12	41	
14	Shildon	38	10	9	19	49	75	−26	39	
15	Whickham	38	10	9	19	44	71	−27	39	
16	Peterlee Newtown	38	7	17	14	57	65	−8	38	
17	Brandon United	38	9	11	18	44	70	−26	38	
18	Stockton	38	10	6	22	40	79	−39	36	Relegated to Division Two
19	Alnwick Town	38	7	10	21	40	78	−38	31	Relegated to Division Two
20	Durham City	38	6	9	23	47	86	−39	27	Relegated to Division Two

Source: fchd
Rules for classification: 1) points; 2) goal difference; 3) number of goals scored.

== Division Two ==
Northern Football League Division Two
- Season: 1990–91
- Champions: West Auckland Town
- Promoted: West Auckland Town; Langley Park; Easington Colliery
- Matches: 342
- Goals: 1,144 (3.35 per match)

Division Two featured 17 clubs which competed in the division last season, along with two new clubs, relegated from Division One:

- Billingham Town
- Easington Colliery

=== League table ===
Pos	Team	Pld	W	D	L	GF	GA	GD	Pts	Promotion or relegation
1	West Auckland Town	36	24	7	5	72	39	+33	79	Promoted to Division One
2	Langley Park	36	24	4	8	83	40	+43	76	Promoted to Division One
3	Easington Colliery	36	20	8	8	80	42	+38	68	Promoted to Division One
4	Hebburn	36	22	5	9	89	56	+33	68 (Note: Hebburn were deducted three points.)	
5	Billingham Town	36	21	5	10	69	39	+30	68	
6	Evenwood Town	36	20	8	8	69	40	+29	65 (Note: Evenwood Town were deducted three points.)	
7	Esh Winning	36	19	6	11	77	57	+20	63	
8	Prudhoe East End	36	16	10	10	71	46	+25	58	
9	Norton & Stockton Ancients	36	16	3	17	60	67	−7	51	
10	Darlington Cleveland Bridge	36	14	7	15	53	60	−7	49	
11	Bedlington Terriers	36	14	6	16	60	73	−13	48	
12	Ashington	36	14	6	16	47	68	−21	48	
13	Crook Town	36	13	8	15	57	64	−7	47	
14	Ryhope Community	36	13	4	19	54	57	−3	43	
15	Shotton Comrades	36	7	9	20	43	73	−30	30	
16	Chester-le-Street Town	36	6	11	19	45	68	−23	29	
17	Washington	36	7	6	23	44	79	−35	27	
18	Willington	36	4	9	23	34	77	−43	21	
19	Horden Colliery Welfare	36	2	10	24	37	99	−62	16	

Source: fchd
Rules for classification: 1) points; 2) goal difference; 3) number of goals scored.
