= Northumberland and Durham Association Cup =

- Founded: 1880
- Abolished: 1884
- Region: Northumberland and County Durham
- Teams: 21
- Most championships: Rangers (Newcastle) (2 wins)

The Northumberland and Durham Association Cup was the first association football tournament for teams in the north-west of England; it proved so successful that the association was split into its constituent counties within four years.

== History ==
The first association football club in the north-east of England, Tyne Association, was founded in 1876, but until 1878 it had no other local club against which to play; after a concerted effort, including inviting teams from Scotland down to demonstrate the game, a number of other clubs were founded, and in January 1880 six of them formed the Northumberland and Durham Association; the founder members were Tyne, Rangers, Corbridge, North-Eastern, Burnopfield, and Haughton-le-Skerne.

They organized a subscription for a new trophy, and £50 was raised for it; by the end of 1880, the association had 18 full members. The trophy stood 30 inches high, with a figure of Victory on top bearing a laurel and palm reath, and bas-reliefs of the coat of arms of Northumberland and Durham, and St George and the Dragon.

=== 1880–81 ===
The first competition was held in 1880–81, and the competition was drawn on a geographical basis (a South Durham and a Newcastle section), with 4 clubs in the former and 7 in the latter. The biggest tie of the round - Rangers v Tyne Association - was drawn in the second round; the game ended in a draw, and Rangers' protest that it had in fact won was turned down, resulting in a large attendance turning up to the Northumberland Cricket Club ground for the replay to see Rangers win 2–0.

Rangers indeed was the first champion, beating South Durham representatives Haughton-le-Skerne 1–0 in the final, played at the Tyne Cricket Ground. The winning goal was credited to captain Simms, whose shot was parried through the post by Dodds. In the semi-final Rangers had beaten Sunderland 5–0, although the lop-sided nature of the draw meant that Houghton-le-Skerne had had a bye into the final.

=== 1881–82 ===
Rangers retained the trophy in 1881–82, beating Tyne in the semi-final and Corbridge in a final replay; Corbridge had won 3–2 at Alnwick, amid some disgruntlement that the referee disallowed an Alnwick goal, after the Corbridge goalkeeper was charged between the posts while holding the ball, after he consulted the rule book in his pocket. Both finals were again being held at the Tyne cricket ground. Corbridge took a first-minute lead in the original game, R. Mitchelson equalizing after 35 minutes. Rangers won the replay 2–0; the first goal was scored by Simms in the first half, and Lochhead clinched near the end, unmarked enough at a corner to nod the ball down to himself to finish.

=== 1882–83 ===
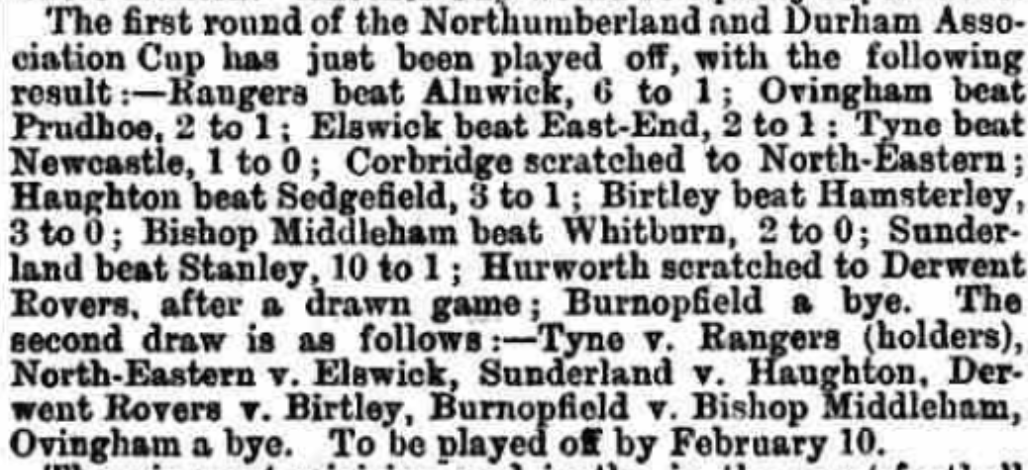
Northumberland and Durham Association Cup 1st Round, Sporting Life, 1 February 1883

1882–83 was the final year of the competition, and it saw its biggest entry of 21 clubs, including Sunderland and Newcastle East End. Rangers suffered its first defeat in the competition with a 1–0 defeat to Tyne Association in the second-final. Tyne indeed went on to win the trophy; again held on the Tyne Cricket Ground, final opponents Sunderland failed to take advantage of the wind behind it in the first half, and second half goals from T. Redmayne and G. H. Ainslie secured the cup for the Newcastle side.

=== Split ===
The success of the competition and growth of the game in the counties had been such that for 1883–84 each county had its own association, running its own competition, namely the Northumberland Senior Cup and Durham Challenge Cup, although for some years afterwards the two cup holders met in a friendly match.

== Finals ==
Northumberland and Durham Association Cup Finals
Season	Date	Winner	Score	Runners Up
1880–81	26 March	Rangers	1–0	Houghton-le-Skerne
1881–82	18 March, 1 April	Rangers	1–1, 2–0	Corbridge
1882–83	31 March	Tyne Association	2–0	Sunderland
