= Corbridge F.C. =

Former association football club in England

Corbridge
- Full name: Corbridge Football Club
- Founded: 1879
- Dissolved: 1882
- Ground: Angel Inn
- Secretary: Frederick Knott
- Captain: E. Docker
colours

Corbridge F.C. was an association football club from Corbridge-on-Tyne, England.

== History ==
The club was formed on 13 October 1879, quickly enrolling 20 members paying 2 shillings per year, and setting up a practice match five days later. Its earliest recorded match was a defeat at a Tyne Association second XI the next month. In January 1880, it was one of the six founder members of the Northumberland and Durham Football Association. Club secretary Frederick Knott was particularly active in trying to spread the game in villages in the area - after Corbridge beat Tyne Association 2–0 in an exhibition match in the village of Ovingham in September 1880, members of the cricket club agreed to set up a football team.

It was also one of the clubs which entered the first Northumberland and Durham Association Cup in 1880–81, but lost 5–2 at Tyne Association in the first round. In 1881–82, it reached the final, winning the semi-final at Alnwick 3–2, although an inexperienced referee had to check the rule book in his pocket from time to time. In the final, against Rangers of Newcastle at the Tyne Cricket Ground, Corbridge held the holders to a 1–1 draw, having taken a first-minute lead. Rangers won the replay 2–0.

The club however did not take part in the 1882–83 tournament, scratching to North-Eastern, and the last recorded match for the club was a game at home to Tyne Association that ended in acrimony, with Tyne scoring one undisputed goal, but Corbridge "winning" 2–1 on disputed.

The club was revived in October 1886, with Knott as chairman and with the same colours, playing at a low level until around 1893.

== Colours ==
The club's colours were black and red striped jerseys, hose, and cap.

== Ground ==
The club's ground was next to the railway station, and it used the Angel Inn or Railway Hotel for its facilities.
