= Jimmy Scarth =

English footballer

Personal information
- Full name: James William Scarth
- Date of birth: 26 August 1926
- Place of birth: North Shields, England
- Date of death: 12 December 2000 (aged 74)
- Place of death: Welwyn Garden City, England
- Position: Inside forward

Senior career*
Years	Team	Apps	(Gls)
1947	Percy Main Amateurs		
1947	North Shields		
1947–1948	Percy Main Amateurs		
1948–1952	Tottenham Hotspur	7	(3)
1952–1955	Gillingham	138	(24)
1955–1960	Gravesend & Northfleet	189	(64)
- * Club domestic league appearances and goals

James William Scarth (26 August 1926 – 12 December 2000) was an English footballer who for more than fifty years held the record for the fastest hat-trick scored in the history of the Football League.

== Playing career ==
Born in North Shields in 1926, he first made his name with local amateur sides, and as a result was invited to Tottenham Hotspur for trials. Although he impressed the London club and was signed as a professional, he found first team opportunities limited at White Hart Lane. He was one of 19 players used in the club's Championship winning side of 1950–51 when he featured in one match.

He moved to Gillingham in 1952 for £3,500. It was during his time at Priestfield Stadium that he wrote his name into the record books with a lightning-fast hat-trick against Leyton Orient on 1 November 1952. This was officially recognised as the fastest hat-trick in the history of the Football League until February 2004 when James Hayter notched three goals in 2 minutes 20 seconds for AFC Bournemouth against Wrexham, with contemporary reports stating that the previous record had been 2 minutes 30 seconds. Sources published in the intervening years, however, give the total time of Scarth's goals as exactly 2 minutes or even as little as 110 seconds, which is quicker than the 2 mins 13 secs claimed for Irish player Jimmy O'Connor for the "world's fastest hat-trick".

Scarth left Gillingham in 1955 after scoring 24 goals in 138 League matches, and joined non-league Kent team Gravesend & Northfleet, where he was to remain until he retired from football in 1960. During his time there he scored 64 goals in 189 games and helped the club win the Southern League title in 1958.

== Later life ==
In an interview published in Gillingham's matchday programme in 1996, Scarth stated that he began work at a printing firm in Tottenham in 1960, and that at the time of the interview he was living in Hertford and working at Waitrose, but planned to retire when he turned 70 later that year. He died at Welwyn Garden City in 2000. His son Bobby Scarth joined Tottenham as an apprentice but failed to make the breakthrough to the professional game.
