= Darren Drysdale =

Football referee

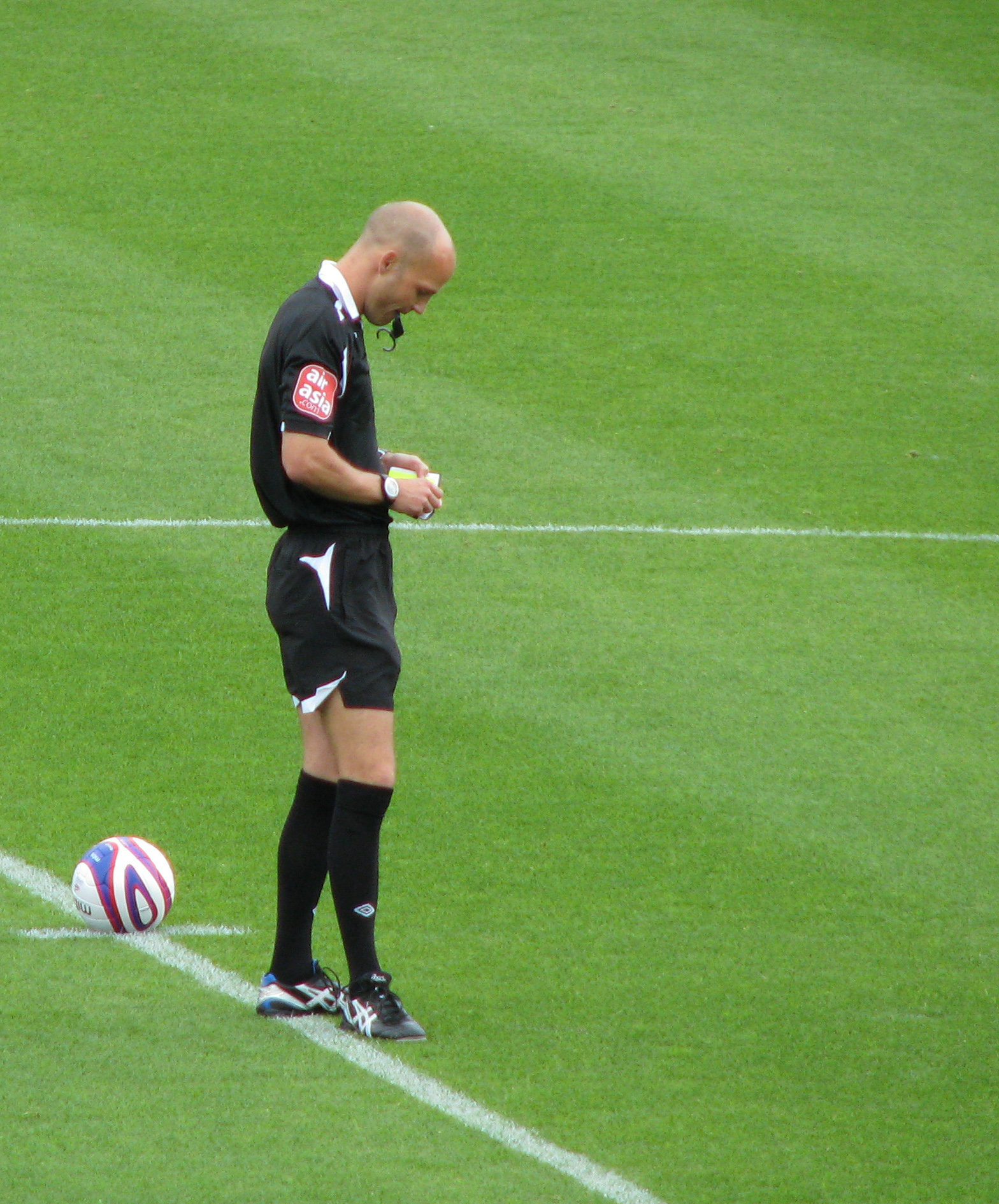
- Full name: Darren Drysdale
- Born: 18 February 1971 (age 55); Lincolnshire
- Other occupation: RAF sergeant

Domestic
Years	League	Role
? - ?	Northern Alliance	Referee
? –1997	Northern Premier League	Referee
1997–2004	Conference North	Referee
1996–1998	Football League	Asst. referee
1998–2004	Premier League	Asst. referee
2004–	Football League	Referee

International
Years	League	Role
2002–2004	UEFA listed	Asst. referee

Darren Drysdale (born 18 February 1971) is an English football referee from Lincolnshire who officiates in the English Football League, and is a sergeant in the RAF at Waddington.

== Career ==
He has been refereeing since 1988, officiating in the Northern Alliance and Northern Premier League. He became an assistant referee for the Football League in 1996, and in 1997 progressed to Conference North referee.

He was appointed as an assistant referee for the Premier League in 1998.

Drysdale was an assistant referee to Graham Poll in the 2000 FA Cup final, and became a FIFA assistant referee in the same year.

In 2002, he became a UEFA assistant referee, one of only 3 from the UK at the time.

He was appointed to the (Football League) National List of referees in 2004. Also in 2004, on 6 March, he was named Combined Services Sports Official of the Year, due to his work for sport within the RAF. He had been posted to the Middle East at this time, so his parents travelled to London to receive the award from the Princess Royal on his behalf.

His first Football League game was a 0–0 draw between Rushden & Diamonds and Kidderminster Harriers on 7 August 2004. His first game at Championship level was the 2–0 home win for Leicester City against Gillingham on 22 January 2005.

Drysdale attracted media attention in 2007 after Bradford City's Dean Windass received a five-match ban for swearing at him in the car park after a home game against Brentford on 2 January.

In February 2021, Drysdale was involved in an altercation with Ipswich Town midfielder Alan Judge after Judge was shown a yellow card. Drysdale was subsequently charged with improper conduct by the Football Association and removed as the referee for his next game.
