= Newcastle Rangers F.C. =

English football club active from 1878 to 1884

Newcastle Rangers
- Full name: Newcastle Rangers Football Club
- Founded: 1878
- Dissolved: 1884
- Ground: St James' Park
- Secretary: R. S. Bain, F. W. Hardy
Home colours

Newcastle Rangers F.C. was an English association football club from Newcastle-upon-Tyne.

== History ==
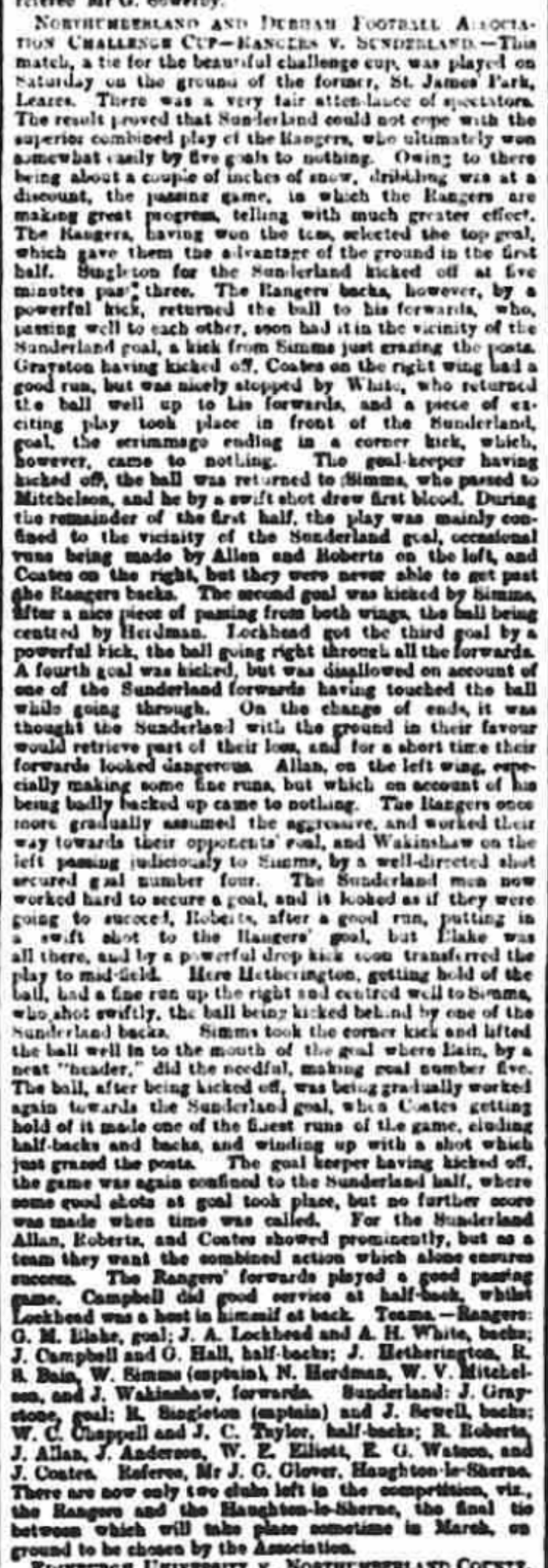
1880–81 Northumberland & Durham Senior Cup, Rangers 5–0 Sunderland, Newcastle Daily Journal, 14 February 1881

The club was founded in 1878, and was the second association club to be formed in Newcastle, after Tyne Association. The club was often known simply as Rangers given the lack of risk of confusion with the Glaswegian club.

In January 1880, it was one of the six clubs which formed the Northumberland and Durham Association. The six teams arranged for a new competition, the Northumberland and Durham Association Cup, and Rangers was the first winner, beating Haughton-le-Skerne 1–0 in the final, played at the Tyne Cricket Ground. The winning goal was credited to captain Simms, whose shot was parried through the post by Dodds. In the semi-final Rangers had beaten Sunderland 5–0.

Rangers retained the trophy at the same venue in 1881–82; the original final against Corbridge ended in a 1–1 draw, R. Mitchelson scoring the Rangers' goal after 35 minutes, after Smith could only half-save a V. Mitchelson shot, equalizing a first-minute goal. Rangers won the replay 2–0 with goals from Simms in the first half, and Lochhead near the end, unmarked enough at a corner to nod the ball down to himself to finish.

Rangers' stature on the local scene was properly shown by it providing four players (and two reserves) for the county representative match against Cleveland in 1883. However it lost its hold on the local cup, losing 1–0 to eventual winner Tyne Association in the semi-final.

The competition did not survive into a fourth season, splitting between the Northumberland Senior Cup and Durham Challenge Cup, and Rangers duly entered the former in 1883–84. Ostensibly still a strong side, the Rangers beat Alnwick 6–0 at Dalton Street in the second round, However Rangers could only muster 9 men for a match at Ovingham - which Rangers nevertheless still won - suggesting that interest was fading.

The club finished the 1883–84 season with two defeats in competitive matches - to Tyne Association in the Northumberland Senior Cup final in March and to Newcastle F.C. in the Northumberland Charity Shield semi-final in April, the club again being handicapped in the latter tie by playing with a man short.

After this, star player Lochhead returned to Glasgow for work, and that seems to have robbed most of the first choice players of any desire to continue playing, not merely just for Rangers, but for anyone; the last recorded match for the club, a defeat at Sleekburn Wanderers in September 1884, was with more or less the second XI which had played the equivalent fixture the season before. With the game growing, nobody seemed to notice, or even care, that one of the top two sides in the area in 1883–84 had disappeared, and by 1885 the Newcastle Rangers name was being used by a rugby club.

== Colours ==
The club originally played in dark blue, modified to navy blue and white from 1882.

== Ground ==
Due to a lack of suitable grounds in Newcastle itself, the club started out using the Drill Field in Gateshead as its home, basing itself in the Prince Consort Arms.

Rangers was the first proper football club to play at St James' Park, doing so from 1880 to 1882. The club originally used the Strawberry House for changing facilities but had a club room open by December 1880.

In October 1882 the club moved to a "capital field" on Dalton Street in Byker, using the Railway Station Hotel for changing rooms.

== Honours ==
- Northumberland and Durham Association Cup
  - Winner: 1880–81, 1881–82
- Northumberland Senior Cup
  - Runner-up: 1883–84
