= Bedlington United A.F.C. =

Bedlington United
- Full name: Bedlington United Association Football Club
- Nickname(s): Terriers
- Founded: by 1897
- Dissolved: 1938
- Ground: Hollymount (1897–1920); Burdon Park (1920–1938)
- League: Northern Alliance
- 1937–38: Northern Alliance, 20th
Home colours

Bedlington United A.F.C. was an English association football club based in the town of Bedlington, Northumberland.

== History ==
Bedlington United was formed in or before 1897, and in that year became a founder member of the East Northumberland Combination. The team played in the East Northumberland League from 1902, and their 1907–08 league title preceded election to the Northern Alliance. Bedlington regularly finished in mid-table in the seasons running up to the war; their best result was fourth in 1911–12.

Bedlington continued in the Northern Alliance for one post-war season and were then accepted into the North-Eastern League. They finished bottom in their first season, but were reprieved by four teams leaving to join the newly formed Football League Third Division North, and continued in mid-table or below until 1929–30, when a bottom-place finish meant they were relegated to the North-Eastern League Second Division. Runners-up spots in 1934 and 1935 did not bring promotion, and when the North-Eastern League reverted to a single division, Bedlington joined the re-formed Northern Alliance. They struggled on for two seasons, but after a third in which they finished bottom of the table, conceded eight goals both at home and away to Newcastle United "A", failed to win away from home until the penultimate match of the season, and had three players fail to turn up for the last home fixture, the club resigned. Its structure as a limited liability company combined with a longstanding lack of interest from the shareholders had made it impossible to continue. A public meeting agreed to set up a new club with the intention of replacing it in the Northern Alliance, but there were five clubs applying for three vacancies and Bedlington were unsuccessful.

Bedlington United first entered the FA Cup in 1908–09, and entered every season until 1927–28; their last participation was in 1935–36. Their best performance was in 1926–27, when they reached the second round proper before losing heavily to North-Eastern League rivals Carlisle United. They beat favourites Blyth Spartans 5–0 to win the Northumberland Senior Cup for the first time in 1923, and won it again in 1928.

== Colours ==
The club wore the same colours as Sunderland A.F.C., namely red and white striped shirts and black shorts.

== Ground ==
The club originally played at Hollymount, building a stand there in 1913, and the sale of advertising space within the ground contributed to the club's finances. However, the land was requisitioned in 1920 by the local council for house building, and the club moved to a site in Church Lane to be known as Burdon Park.
