= Durham County Football Association =

Sport governing body in Northern England

- Nickname: Durham FA
- Formation: 1883; 143 years ago
- Purpose: County football association
- Headquarters: 'Codeslaw'; Riverside South
- Location: Chester-le-Street DH3 3SJ
- Region served: County Durham
- Company Secretary: John Topping
- Website: durhamfa.com

The Durham County Football Association (also simply known as the Durham FA) is the governing body of football in the county of Durham, from grassroots to professional level. The Durham FA was founded on 25 March 1883. They run a number of cups for teams across the county for under-18, under-21, ladies teams, and an under-18 representative team.

== History ==
In 1879, the joint Durham and Northumberland Football Association was founded, until 1883, when travel problems for the clubs prompted a change. On 11 May 1883, 40 clubs met in the Alexandra Hotel in Newcastle and voted to form an independent body known as the Northumberland Football Association. The Durham clubs followed suit by holding a meeting at the Three Tuns Hotel, Durham City, on 25 May 1883. The nine clubs who were represented at that meeting formed the Durham County Football Association.

In its second season, 18 clubs took part in the Durham Challenge Cup, the only county cup competition in the country at that time. On its 125th anniversary in 2007–08, the association organised 11 county cup competitions at various levels, and a total of 988 clubs participated. The association now has 2,386 teams and 1,055 referees affiliated, with 13 staff. In 1883, the staff consisted of a part-time honorary secretary.

The association opened its first rented office at 10 Tenters Terrace, Durham City, on 1 October 1913. In June 1923, it purchased Codeslaw, The Avenue, Durham City, to provide "an office, meeting rooms and residence for the secretary". In 1971, the association moved to larger offices at The Sands, Durham City, which were officially opened by its then President, Arthur Askew. Owing to an increase in staff, another move was required and a custom-built suite of offices was erected at The Riverside, Chester-le-Street, which were officially opened on 9 June 2005 by the association's president, Frank Pattison, and the chairman of The Football Association, Geoffrey Thompson.

== Development ==
The Durham County Football Association (FA) assists clubs, leagues, and educational institutions. It collaborates with external development officers. Between 2008 and 2012, the Durham County FA established new partnerships.

== Governance ==
The governance department runs the day-to-day running of the County Football Association to provide assistance and advice in administration matters.

== Leagues ==
=== Affiliated leagues ===
==== Men's Saturday leagues ====
- Wearside League
- Crook and District League
- Darlington Church and Friendly League
- Durham Alliance League
- Tyne and Wear Business Houses League
- Wearside Combination League

==== Ladies and girls leagues ====
- Durham County Women's League
- Durham County Council Girls Mini Soccer League
- Tyne Tees Girls Youth League

==== Men's Sunday leagues ====
- Consett and District Sunday League
- Durham and District Sunday League
- Darlington Sunday Morning Invitation League
- Hartlepool Sunday League
- Peterlee and District Sunday League
- South Shields Sunday League
- Spennymoor Sunday League
- Stockton Sunday League
- Sunderland Sunday League

==== Other leagues ====
- Durham Emergency Services League
- Sunderland and District Sunderland Steels Social Club Over 40s League
- Wear Valley Sunday League

==== Youth leagues ====
- Durham County Under 21s Saturday League
- Durham County Under 18s League
- Gateshead Youth League
- Hartlepool Street League
- South Tyneside Youth League

==== Small sided leagues ====
- Champion Soccer – Hartlepool (Monday & Thursday)
- Champion Soccer – South Shields (Monday)
- Power League – Gateshead
- 6-a-side League – Sunderland

=== Disbanded or amalgamated leagues ===
Leagues that were affiliated to the Durham County FA but have disbanded or amalgamated with other leagues include:

- Auckland and District League (also known as Bishop Auckland and District League)
- Auckland and District Junior League
- Barnard Castle and District League
- Chester-le-Street and District League
- Darlington Church & Friendly League
- Darlington and District League
- Darlington and District Sunday Morning League
- Darlington Weekend League
- Darlington Youth League
- Durham Central League
- Gaunless Valley League
- Houghton and District League
- Jarrow and District Junior League
- Mid Durham League
- Seaham and District League
- South Durham League
- Stanley and District League
- Stanley and District Sunday League
- Stockton League
- Sunderland & District Nonconformist & Brotherhood League (now known as Wearside Combination League)
- Washington and District League (known as the Durham Alliance League from 1996)

== Affiliated member clubs ==
Among the notable clubs that are (or at one time were) affiliated to the Durham County FA are:

- Billingham Synthonia
- Billingham Town
- Birtley Town
- Bishop Auckland
- Brandon United
- Chester-le-Street Town
- Cleator Moor Celtic
- Cockfield (now defunct)
- Consett
- Craghead United (now defunct)
- Crook Town
- Darlington
- Darlington Railway Athletic
- Dunston Federation Brewery
- Durham City
- Easington Colliery
- Esh Winning
- Gateshead
- Hartlepool United
- Hebburn
- Horden Colliery Welfare
- Jarrow Roofing
- Leadgate Park (now defunct)
- Murton (now defunct)
- Newton Aycliffe
- Norton & Stockton Ancients
- Peterlee Town
- Prudhoe Town
- Ryhope Colliery Welfare (now defunct)
- Seaham Coast Youth
- Seaham Red Star
- Shildon
- South Shields
- Spennymoor Town
- Spennymoor United (now defunct)
- Stockton (now defunct)
- Stockton Town
- Sunderland
- Sunderland Albion (now defunct)
- Sunderland Nissan (now defunct)
- Sunderland RCA
- Tow Law Town
- Washington
- West Auckland Town
- West Hartlepool (now defunct)
- West Stanley (now defunct)
- Whickham
- Willington
- Wolviston

== County Cup Competitions ==
The Durham County FA ran the following Cup Competitions:

- Durham County Challenge Cup
- Durham County Trophy Competition
- Durham County Minor Cup Competition
- Durham County Sunday Cup Competition
- Durham County Under 18s Sunday Cup Competition
- Durham County Bill Upsall Youth Minor Cup Competition
- Durham County Under 14s Cup Competition
- Durham County Tesco Under 13 Cup Competition
- Durham County Under 12s Cup Competition
- Durham County Women's County Cup Competition
- Durham County Youth Cup Competition

== County cup winners ==
Competition	Winners (2010–11)
Durham County Challenge Cup	Gateshead Reserves
Durham County Trophy	Hebburn Reyrolle
Durham County Minor Cup	Sunderland Redhouse
Durham County Youth Cup	Gateshead Under 18s

== Directors and officials ==
=== Directors ===
- F.D. Pattison
- R. Strophair
- J.R. Parker
- P.Maguire
- R.Coleman
- G. Charlton
- K. Clark
- J. Sinclair
- J.C. Topping

=== Key officials ===
- J.C. Topping (Company Secretary)
- Mrs T. Lavery (Office Manager)
- Chris Smith (County Development Manager)
