= Willington Athletic F.C. =

Willington Athletic
- Full name: Willington Athletic Football Club
- Founded: 1889
- Dissolved: 1919
- Ground: Willington Quay
- League: Northern Alliance
- 1914–15: Northern Alliance, 3rd
Home colours

Willington Athletic Football Club was an English football club based in Willington Quay, Northumberland. The team played at a ground next to Howdon railway station.

== History ==
Willington Athletic was founded in 1888, and it joined the Northern Alliance in 1891–92. The club won that league's championship for the first time in 1899–1900, repeating the feat in 1904–05, 1905–06 and 1909–10.

Its team first entered the FA Cup in 1891–92 – they lost to Shankhouse in the second qualifying round after a replay – and entered each season until competitive football was abandoned for the duration of the First World War. In 1899–1900, they reached the fifth qualifying round, in which they lost to Jarrow, also after a replay. They won the Northumberland Senior Cup in 1896 and 1897.

The club applied for election to the Football League in 1903, but received only one vote.

When the Northern Alliance resumed after the war, Willington Athletic initially intended to continue in membership, but by the time the 1919–20 season began, the club had resigned, its letter being accepted "with very deep regret". The last recorded fixture for the club was a friendly in August 1919, although some former players turned out for a charity match under the Athletic name in 1923.

== Colours ==
The club wore dark blue shirts.

== Ground ==
The club's first ground was known as Rosehill, and in 1900 the club moved to a new ground, known as Willington Quay (or occasionally as the Howdon Station Ground), midway between Howdon and Willington Quay stations. In 1927 it was turned into a recreation ground by the local council.

== Honours and achievements ==
- Northern Alliance
  - Champions: 1899–1900, 1904–05, 1905–06, 1909–10
- Northumberland Senior Cup
  - Winners: 1896, 1897

== Notable players ==
- Former players ( 14 )
