= Charlie Lloyd (footballer) =

English footballer

Personal information
- Full name: Charles Frederick Lloyd
- Date of birth: 27 September 1906
- Place of birth: North Shields, England
- Date of death: 1979 (aged 72–73)
- Position: Defender

Senior career*
Years	Team	Apps	(Gls)
1925	Preston Colliery		
1925–1926	Percy Main Amateurs		
1926–1927	Hull City	7	(0)
1928–1929	Southend United	1	(0)
1929–1930	Loughborough Corinthians		
1931–1933	Mansfield Town	5	(0)
1933	Ripley Town		
- * Club domestic league appearances and goals

Charles Frederick Lloyd (27 September 1906 – 1979) was an English footballer who played for Preston Colliery, Percy Main Amateurs, Hull City, Mansfield Town and Southend United.
