= Tyneside Amateur League =

English football league

- Founded: 1949
- Folded: 2019
- No. of teams: 12
- Country: England
- Last champion: Haltwhistle Jubilee
- Feeder to: Northern Alliance Division Two

The Tyneside Amateur League was a football competition based in England. It had one division, which was a feeder to the Northern Alliance.

The League was formed in 1949 and was 60 years old in 2009. To celebrate this, the League held a dinner with John Beresford as the guest speaker on 12 June at The Lancastrian Suite of the Dunston Federation Brewery. The League ceased after the 2018–19 season.

== Final member clubs ==
- Gosforth Bohemian Reserves
- Haltwhistle Jubilee
- Morpeth FC
- Newcastle Benfield Reserves
- Newcastle Chemfica Amateurs
- Newcastle Medicals
- Ponteland United Reserves
- Red House Farm
- Swalwell Juniors
- Wallsend B.C. Senior Development
- West Jesmond
- Wideopen

== Champions ==
Season	Division One	Division Two
2002–03	Felling Greyhound	Willington Quay Saints
2003–04	Winlaton Vulcan Inn	The Bush Wallsend
2004–05	Winlaton Vulcan Inn	Ryton Reserves
2005–06	Winlaton Vulcan Inn	Blyth Town Reserves
2006–07	Winlaton Vulcan Inn	Forest Hall
2007–08	Forest Hall	Killingworth YPC Town
2008–09	Killingworth YPC Town	Blakelaw Crofters Lodge
2009–10	Wincanton Vulcan Inn	Whickham Lang Jacks
2010–11	Whickham Lang Jacks	Blyth Isabella
2011–12	West Jesmond	Winlaton Queens Head
2012–13	New York	Chopwell
2013–14	Lindisfarne Custom Planet	Hazlerigg Victory
2014–15	Hazlerigg Victory	
2015–16	Bedlington Juniors	
2016–17	Ponteland United Reserves	
2017–18	Ellington FC	
2018–19	Haltwhistle Jubilee	
