= Haughton-le-Skerne F.C. =

Former association football club in England

Haughton-le-Skerne
- Full name: Haughton-le-Skerne Football Club
- Nickname(s): the Haughtonians
- Founded: 1879
- Dissolved: 1883
- Ground: Haughton Ground, Great Burdon
- Secretary: Alfred Axtell
colours

Haughton-le-Skerne F.C. was the first association football club from Darlington, England.

== History ==
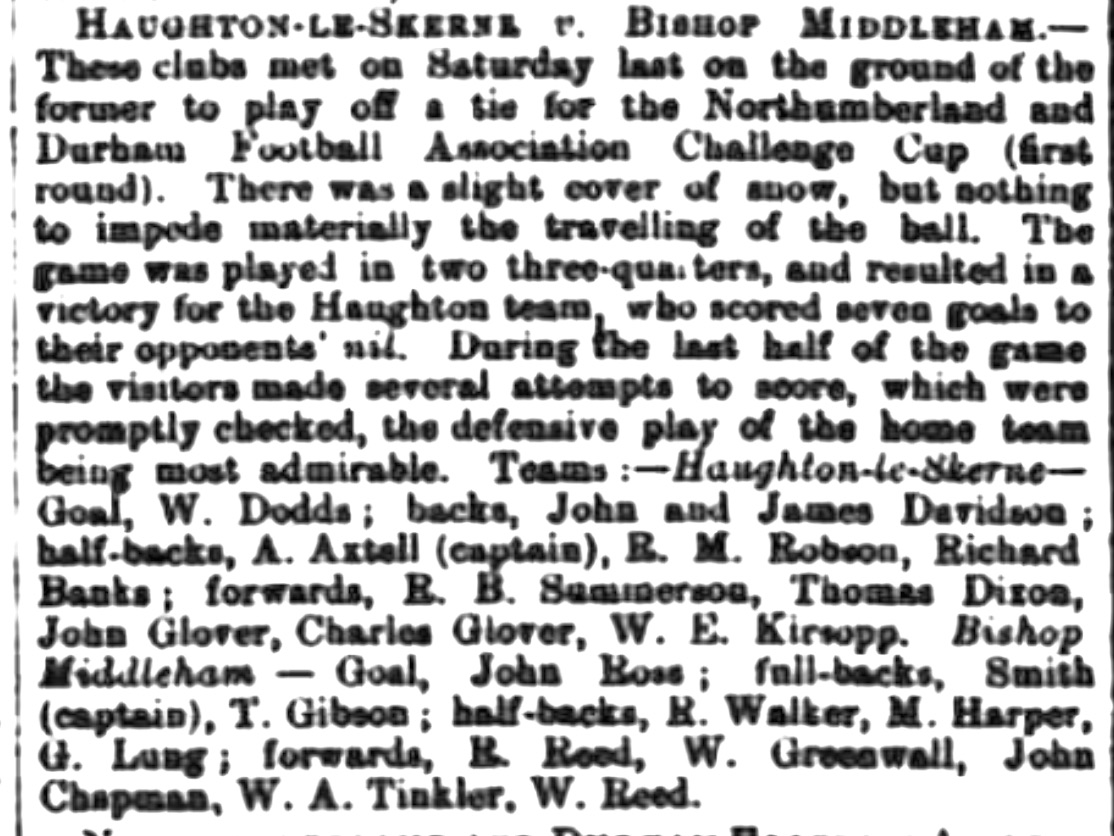
1880–81 Northumberland and Durham Senior Cup, First Round, Haughton-le-Skerne 7–0 Bishop Middleham, Darlington & Stockton Times, 27 November 1880

The club was formed in October 1879; in January 1880, it was one of the six founder members of the Northumberland and Durham Football Association. It had a wide enough membership to include both sides of the political divide - the club closed its first season with a game between Conservative and Liberal members of the club (the Conservatives winning 6–1).

It was also one of the clubs which entered the first Northumberland and Durham Association Cup in 1880–81, and was the South Durham representative in the final after beating Bishop Middleham 7–0 and Ferryhill 2–0. The club however lost 1–0 to Rangers of Newcastle-upon-Tyne in the final. The club's second and last entry in the competition ended in a first-round defeat to a side from Darlington Grammar School the next season.

The club continued until the end of the 1882–83 season, its final recorded game being a 6–0 defeat at Redcar & Coatham in April. On 20 July 1883, the Grammar School hosted a meeting with a view to forming a single football club for the town; Haughton-le-Skerne in effect formed part of this movement, as the new Darlington F.C.'s earliest matches included a number of Haughton players - of those who faced Redcar, Summerson, Stabler, C. Glover, and Kirksop all played for Darlington against West Hartlepool in October 1883, and Rickinson, Wright, and Buckton all played for Darlington in the 1884–85 season.

== Colours ==
The club's colours were amber and navy blue.

== Ground ==
The club's ground was in Great Burdon, 2 miles from both Bank Top and North Road railway station in Darlington, and known simply as "the Haughton ground". The club used the Grey Horse Inn in Haughton-le-Skerne for facilities.
