= Morpeth Harriers F.C. =

Morpeth Harriers
- Full name: Morpeth Harriers Football Club
- Nickname: the Harriers
- Founded: 1883?; re-founded 1897
- Dissolved: 1891; again 1910
- Ground: Grange House Field, Dogger Bank
Home colours

Morpeth Harriers Football Club is the name of two football clubs from Morpeth, in Northumberland.

== Original incarnation ==
The club was founded in about 1883 by James and Harry Jobling, C. Purdy, and Jack Oliver. The club was named after a famous Northumbrian hunt.

By 1884 the club already had enough members for two sides. The Harriers suffered an early tragedy when the club secretary, William Mavin, died of an injury he received when playing for Morpeth Rangers in November 1885.

=== Co-winners of the Northumberland Senior Cup ===
The club was declared the co-winner of the Northumberland Senior Cup in 1885–86 in unique circumstances. Drawn against Shankhouse Black Watch in the semi-final, the two clubs played out three 1–1 draws, the first two ties both seeing Morpeth equalize with seven minutes to go.

It looked as if Shankhouse had won through at the fourth time of asking, with a late winner in the third replay, but Morpeth protested on the basis that the goal had been scored after its players heard a whistle and stopped playing, giving Shankhouse a simple goal. The whistle came from someone in the crowd. On appeal, the Football Association ruled that there had been crowd interference with the match, and scrubbed off the goal.

Therefore, the teams had to play for a fifth time, under orders to continue until the match finished. However, after three half-an-hour periods of extra-time, the game remained goalless, and it was too dark to continue.

Instead of playing a sixth game, the clubs drew lots to see who would play West End in the final, and Shankhouse drew the winning lot. However this was not to work out who won the semi-final, but to work out who would represent both clubs in the final. Shankhouse duly won 3–2, and, as a result, both Shankhouse and the Harriers were declared to be the co-holders of the Cup. It was the Harriers' only triumph in the competition, and they had the distinction of winning a knockout cup without ever playing a final.

=== FA Cup ===
The club entered the FA Cup for the first time in 1887–88. In the first round, despite weather that was "wretched in the extreme", nearly 4,000 attended the club's tie at Sunderland. The Harriers lost 4–2, but, as Ford of Sunderland had not been registered in time for the competition, the FA ordered a replay at Morpeth's ground. The Harriers were two-nil up inside half-an-hour, but Sunderland, who had been unbeaten all season, came back to win 3–2.

Qualifying rounds were introduced the following season, and Morpeth lost to Birtley F.C. in the second qualifying round in 1888–89. This time Morpeth were the victims of a protest, having won the original tie 3–1, and lost the second attempt 1–-0 after injury reduced them to 10 men for eighty minutes.

The club entered the Cup for the following two seasons, both times losing in the first qualifying round to the Whitburn (England) club of Sunderland.

=== North-eastern league ===
The north-east football landscape was transformed by the legalization of professionalism; Sunderland A.F.C. had rich backers and the two leading Newcastle clubs merged to form Newcastle United, and both joined national leagues, which enabled them to earn the income to pay for their players. The Harriers, like many north-east clubs, lacked such resources, and turned to local football to generate income.

In 1889–90, the club was a founder member of the North-Eastern League, but the League was plagued with financial difficulties and organizational problems. Each club should have played 18 matches, but, by April, no team had played more than 15, and the competition seems to have petered out - disastrously for the Harriers, as, with 19 points from 13 games, the club was top. By May, the media were seeking information as to what was happening, in vain.

Consequently, with only a precarious income, the club ceased operations in 1891.

== Colours ==
The club played in black shirts with a yellow hoop. The revived club also wore amber and black.

== Second incarnation ==
In 1897, two clubs in Morpeth, AFC and YMCA, merged to form a new Morpeth Harriers. The new club replaced Morpeth YMCA in the East Northumberland League.

The club finished joint top of the table with Seghill FC in 1898–99, with 37 points from 24 matches. Had goal average or goal difference been applied as a tie-breaker, the Harriers would have been champions; however the League ordered a play-off, which Seghill won. However the club won the title the following year and in 1900–01 the club joined the higher-profile Northern Alliance.

The club struggled in its first season, finishing 12th, but in 1901–02 finished 4th, behind only the reserve sides of Newcastle United, Sunderland, and Middlesbrough. In 1902–03, with the reserve sides excluded, the Harriers won the League by 8 clear points.

However, by the end of the decade, the club was finishing bottom of the table. The 1909–10 season left the club without a deficit and evicted from their ground. A report that "it seems the old team's days are numbered" was prophetic as the club resigned from the Alliance and disbanded.
