= Tweedmouth Rangers F.C. =

Association football club in England

Tweedmouth Rangers
- Full name: Tweedmouth Rangers Football Club
- Founded: 2010
- Ground: Shielfield Park, Berwick-upon-Tweed
- Capacity: 4,000
- Coordinates: 55°45′36″N 2°0′57″W
- Chairman: Colin Smith
- Manager: Kev Wright
- League: East of Scotland League Third Division
- 2025–26: East of Scotland League Second Division, 9th of 11
Home colours	Away colours

Tweedmouth Rangers Football Club are a football team from the town of Berwick-upon-Tweed, England, just south of the border with Scotland.

The club motto is NOLI CAESUM CREDENTES which is the Latin phrase that translated means "Do not believe the slain" and features on the club crest along with the Flag of England.

== History ==
Founded in 2010, they currently play across the border in the East of Scotland Football League, having joined in 2016.

Prior to this, they were members of the North Northumberland League in England.

During the club's time in the North Northumberland League they were champions of Division Two in 2012-13 and runners-up of Division One in 2015–16.

They also enjoyed cup success winning the Robson and Runciman Cups during the 2012-13 treble winning season and the Anderson Cup in 2015–16, while their time in the East of Scotland Football League has often been one of struggle and currently play in the Second Division.

For the 2023–24 season the club started groundsharing with Berwick Rangers and Berwick Bandits at Shielfield Park, which has a capacity of just over 4,000 with 1,366 seats.

In January 2023, Colin Smith accepted the role as club chairman following the resignation of Kevin Dixon.

June 2023, the club announced the appointment of Kev Wright as First Team Manager.

30 August 2025, Tweedmouth played its first Scottish Cup tie against Midlands Premier Team Lochee United losing 3-1 after being 1-0 up for much of the game.

== Club colours ==
The team play in a blue with white trim shirt, navy blue shorts and socks, the away colours are a yellow shirt with black trim, black shorts, and socks.

== Club officials ==
Chairman	Michael Smyth
Vice Chairman	Alex Aitchison
Secretary	Helen Borthwick
Treasurer - Match Secretary	Claire Marr
Club Advisor	Mark Thompson
Child Welfare Protection Officer	Joanne Knox
Committee Member	Ross Aitchison
Committee Member	Mike Martin
Committee Member	Lee Taylor
Official (Advisory) Club Doctor	Dr. Jamie Paweleck MBBS PGDip

== Club coaching staff ==
Manager	Kev Wright
Coach	Gary Smith
GK Coach	Sean Beacroft
Coach	Cory Johnston
Coach	Jake Gibson
Physiotherapist	Megan Dixon

== Current squad ==
As of 1 September 2023

No.	Nationality	Player	Position
1		Ryan Dunn	Goalkeeper
2		Dan Collin	Defender
3		Tommy Malcolm	Defender
4		Evan Smith	Defender
5		Craig Heath	Defender
6		Rhys Dixon	Midfield
7		Ilja Ovcinnikovs	Midfield
8		Harry Clark	Midfield
9		Sam Straughan	Striker
10		Craig Colquhoun	Midfield
11		Jack Clark	Striker
15		Lyall Roberts	Midfield
16			Striker
17			Midfield
18			Defender
19		Dylan Gruter	Defender
20		Dennis Smolenskij	Midfield
21			Midfielde
23		Dylan Gibson	Goalkeeper

== Season-by-season league record ==
Season	League & Division	Position	Played	Wins	Draws	Losses	GD	Points	Season Notes
2010/11	North Northumberland League - Second Division	9th	20	5	3	12	−22	18	
2011/12	North Northumberland League - Second Division	4th	18	10	3	5	+32	33	
2012/13	North Northumberland League - Second Division	1st	16	13	1	2	+56	40	Champions
2013/14	North Northumberland League - First Division *	3rd	16	8	3	5	+22	30	
2014/15	North Northumberland League - First Division	3rd	16	10	3	3	+21	33	
2015/16	North Northumberland League - First Division	2nd	18	13	3	2	+43	42	Runners-Up
2016/17	East of Scotland League	10th	20	3	3	14	−49	12	
2017/18	East of Scotland League	13th	24	1	1	22	−118	4	
2018/19	East of Scotland League - Conference A	13th	24	1	1	22	−95	4	Placed in Conf. A
2019/20	East of Scotland League - Conference B	10th	24	4	4	16	−47	16	Placed in Conf. B
2020/21	East of Scotland League - Conference B **	16th	7	0	0	7	−31	0	
2021/22	East of Scotland League - Conference A	13th	28	6	0	22	−47	18	Switch to Conf. A
2022/23	East of Scotland League - Second Division	8th	32	12	7	13	−14	43	Placed in Div.Two
2023/24	East of Scotland League - Second Division								

Three Points awarded to Tweedmouth Rangers FC; Red Row FC played ineligible player in fixture between two clubs *

Season curtailed due to coronavirus pandemic **

== South Challenge Cup record ==
Season	Progress	Opposition	Venue	Result
2018-19	Second Round	Leith Athletic	Home	0-2
2019-20	Second Round	Upper Annandale	Home	1-2
2020-21	Second Round	Leith Athletic	Away	0-3
2021-22	Second Round	Coldstream	Away	0-3
2022-23	First Round	Dunbar United	Home	2-3
2023-24	First Round	West Calder United	Away	2-3
