= Newcastle Benfield F.C. =

Association football club in Newcastle upon Tyne, England

Newcastle Benfield
- Full name: Newcastle Benfield Football Club
- Nickname: The Lions
- Founded: 1988; 38 years ago (as Brunswick Village)
- Ground: Sam Smith's Park, Walkergate, Newcastle upon Tyne
- Capacity: 2,000
- Coordinates: 54°59′31″N 1°33′32″W
- Chairman: Craig Bell
- Manager: Andrew Ferguson
- League: Northern League Division One
- 2025–26: Northern League Division One, 13th of 19
Home colours	Away colours

Newcastle Benfield Football Club is an English football club based in Newcastle upon Tyne, England.

== History ==
The roots of the club can be traced back to Brunswick Village Football Club, which was founded in 1988 and entered into the Northern Alliance Division Two. After only one season (a 10th-place finish) the team's name was changed to Heaton Corner House Football Club, playing at Walker Park. Heaton Corner were champions of the Northern Alliance Division Two during the 1989–90 season.

At the end of their first season, the club moved to their current home, Sam Smith's Park and changed their name to Newcastle Benfield Park a further year later. By the early 1990s, they had finished runners-up in the Northern Alliance Division One and were competing in the Premier Division of that league system. During the first year of being promoted into the league, Benfield were crowned champions; in fact they did the league and cup double, capturing the Northern Alliance League Cup.

=== Merger with North Shields St Columbas ===
Despite lifting the championship, the club were not promoted to a higher league and continued on within the division for the rest of the 90s. In 1999 Benfield Park merged with North Shields side St. Columbas and changed their name to Newcastle Benfield Saints. They regained the Premier Division title in 2003 and with it promotion to the Northern League Division Two. Another promotion followed the next season, to Northern League Division One.

Their first season at this higher level, 2004–05, saw them finish in a creditable fourth place and reach the final of the Northumberland FA Senior Cup. In 2005 they changed their name again, this time to Newcastle Benfield Bay Plastics.

The 2005–06 season started badly, but fortunes changed after the appointment of the former York City, Carlisle United, Hartlepool United and Torquay United player Paul Baker as manager in September 2005. They reached the fifth round of the FA Vase and finished 9th in the league.

For the 2007–08 season Bay Plastics was dropped from the team's title and for that season Benfield were known simply as Newcastle Benfield BP.

=== Recent times ===
In the 2006–07 season, the team, which has never made it to the first round proper of the FA Cup, were drawn at home to former Football League side York City in the final qualifying round of the 2006–07 competition, but lost 1–0, a Clayton Donaldson penalty winning the tie for York. Despite the disappointment of the loss, a new club attendance record of 926 was set. At the end of the season the club was once again renamed Newcastle Benfield. In the final game of the 2006–07 season, the club won the Northern League Cup by beating Sunderland Nissan 1–0 at Federation Park, home of Dunston Federation Brewery. The goal was a long distance free-kick scored by club captain Alusene Bangura.

In the 2008–09 season Benfield won the league cup and championship double with the championship running to the final game of the season. After a rotation of managerial staff over the past year Paul Baker returned as manager with Alu Bangura as assistant manager.

During the 2011–12 season former Newcastle United player and Peruvian international, Nolberto Solano joined the club as first team coach.

In 2013–14 the club reached the quarter-final of the FA Vase beating holders Spennymoor Town along the way before losing narrowly to St Andrews. The club finished 14th in the Northern League.

Since 2012 the club have added teams under the Benfield banner, the reserves play in the Northern Football Alliance using primarily young local talent, and the Juniors play in the Durham FA under-18 league and compete regularly in the FA Youth Cup.

== Records ==
- Best FA Cup result: Third qualifying round (2008–09, 2017–18)
- Best FA Vase result: Quarter-finals (2013–14)

== Honours ==
- Northern League Division One
  - Champions: 2008–09
- Northern League Cup
  - Winners: 2008–09, 2010–11
- Northern League Division Two
  - Runners-up: 2003–04
- Northern League Cup
  - Winners: 2006–07
- Northern Alliance Premier Division
  - Champions: 1994–95, 2002–03
- Northern Alliance Division One
  - Runners-up: 1993–94
- Northern Alliance Division Two
  - Champions: 1989–90
- Northern Alliance League Cup
  - Winners: 1994–95
