= North Northumberland Football League =

English amateur league football competition

- Founded: 1898
- Division: One
- No. of teams: 11
- Country: England
- Most recent champion: Alnmouth United (2024-25)
- Promotion to: Northern Alliance Division Two

The North Northumberland Football League is a football competition based in England.

When it had two divisions, the highest (Division One) was a feeder to the Northern Alliance. The league consisted of teams from between the rivers Tweed and Wansbeck.

Member teams compete in the Northumberland FA Minor Cup as well as six cup competitions run by the league: the Bilclough Cup, the Sanderson Cup, the Anderson Cup, the Runciman Cup and the Robson Cup, as well as the sixth one.

== Recent champions ==
| Season | Division One | Division Two |
|---|---|---|
| 2006–07 | Amble United | Hedgeley Rovers |
| 2007–08 | Stobswood Welfare | Bedlington Terrier Reserves |
| 2008–09 | Ashington Booze Brothers Athletic | Alnwick Town Reserves |
| 2009–10 | Rothbury | Lynemouth Institute |
| 2010–11 | Alnwick Town Reserves | Wooler |
| 2011–12 | Wooler | Red Row Welfare |
| 2012–13 | AFC Newbiggin | Tweedmouth Rangers |
| 2013–14 | Shilbottle Colliery Welfare | Wansbeck |
| 2014–15 | Alnmouth United | Amble St. Cuthbert |
| 2015–16 | Red Row Welfare | Tweedmouth Harrow |
| 2016–17 | Tweedmouth Harrow | Embleton Whinstone Rovers |
| 2017–18 | North Sunderland | No Division Two |
| 2018–19 | AFC Newbiggin | No Division Two |
| 2019–20 | Season abandoned due to COVID-19 pandemic | No Division Two |
| 2020–21 | Alnwick Town Development | No Division Two |
| 2021–22 | Amble AFC | No Division Two |
| 2022–23 | AFC Newbiggin Reserves | No Division Two |
| 2023–24 | Alnmouth United | No Division Two |
| 2024–25 | Alnmouth United | No Division Two |

== 2022–23 clubs ==
- Alnmouth FC
- Alnwick Town B
- Berwick Town FC
- Ellington FC
- Longhoughton Rangers FC
- Lowick United FC
- AFC Newbiggin Reserves
- North Sunderland FC
- Swarland FC
- Wooler FC
