= Ponteland United F.C. =

Association football club in England

Coordinates: 55°02′51.49″N 1°44′26.68″W

Ponteland United
- Full name: Ponteland United Football Club
- Nickname: Pont
- Founded: 1900
- Ground: Ponteland Leisure Centre, Ponteland
- Chairman: Paul Brooks
- Manager: Alex Martin
- League: Northern Alliance Premier Division
- 2025–26: Northern Alliance Premier Division, 7th of 17
- Website: https://www.pontelandunitedfc.com/

Ponteland United Football Club is a football club based in Ponteland, Northumberland, England. They are currently members of the Northern Alliance Premier Division and play at Ponteland Leisure Centre.

== History ==
Established back in 1900, Ponteland United have been a local football team for over 100 years.

The club officially joined the Northern Alliance in the 1983–84 season.

In their inaugural season, Ponteland finished 9th out of 14 teams, laying the foundation for their future endeavours. Subsequent seasons saw fluctuating performances, with notable finishes including a 4th place in the 1984–85 season and a 2nd place in the 1996–97 and 1998–99 seasons.

Throughout the 1990s, the club finished runners-up six times in the Northern Alliance League Cup, including four times in a row between 1991 and 1995 and they also finished runners-up three times in the Northern Alliance Challenge Cup. However, during the period they did manage to win their first Northumberland Senior Benevolent Bowl in 1995–96.

A second Northumberland Senior Benevolent Bowl success followed in 2004–05, but Ponteland's crowning achievement arrived in the 2010–11 season when they secured their first-ever Northern Alliance Premier Division league title. In a dramatic final game Ponteland pipped Alnwick Town to the title with a last minute winner against Blyth Town (Pont were due to finish 2nd before the goal was scored).

Despite facing relegation to Division 1 in the 2011–12 season, Ponteland swiftly rebounded and secured promotion back to the Premier Division in the 2015–16 season, accompanied by a Northern Alliance League Cup triumph. Subsequent seasons witnessed commendable performances, including another Northern Alliance Challenge Cup victory in the 2016–17 season.

Ponteland United remains a stalwart presence in the Northern Football Alliance Premier Division.

== League history ==
Season	League	Division	PLD	W	D	L	GF	GA	PTS	Position	Notes
2026–27	Northern Football Alliance	Premier Division									
2025–26	Northern Football Alliance	Premier Division	32	16	6	10	72	51	54	7/17	
2024–25	Northern Football Alliance	Premier Division	30	14	7	9	50	36	49	6/16	
2023–24	Northern Football Alliance	Premier Division	30	11	3	16	42	56	36	10/16	
2022–23	Northern Football Alliance	Premier Division	30	9	9	12	58	59	36	11/16	
2021–22	Northern Football Alliance	Premier Division	30	10	6	14	32	47	36	10/16	
2020–21	Northern Football Alliance	Premier Division	8	4	0	4	18	18	12	N/A	Abandoned due to COVID-19
2019–20	Northern Football Alliance	Premier Division	20	11	2	7	48	31	35	N/A	Abandoned due to COVID-19
2018–19	Northern Football Alliance	Premier Division	30	13	4	13	60	57	43	6/16	
2017–18	Northern Football Alliance	Premier Division	30	17	6	7	68	49	57	3/16	
2016–17	Northern Football Alliance	Premier Division	28	16	2	10	62	49	50	4/15	Challenge Cup winners
2015–16	Northern Football Alliance	Division 1	28	17	3	8	88	55	54	3/15	Promoted and League Cup winners
2014–15	Northern Football Alliance	Division 1	28	12	3	13	49	48	39	9/15	
2013–14	Northern Football Alliance	Division 1	28	9	8	11	45	66	35	9/15	
2012–13	Northern Football Alliance	Division 1	30	12	4	14	68	66	40	9/16	Division One Combination Cup winners
2011–12	Northern Football Alliance	Premier Division	30	6	5	19	45	88	23	15/16	Relegated
2010–11	Northern Football Alliance	Premier Division	32	22	5	5	72	31	71	1/17	League champions
2009–10	Northern Football Alliance	Premier Division	32	14	6	12	51	50	48	8/17	Challenge Cup winners
2008–09	Northern Football Alliance	Premier Division	32	9	11	12	56	60	38	10/17	
2007–08	Northern Football Alliance	Premier Division	30	11	3	16	66	63	36	11/16	
2006–07	Northern Football Alliance	Premier Division	28	14	8	6	59	35	50	3/15	
2005–06	Northern Football Alliance	Premier Division	30	12	3	15	52	63	39	9/16	
2004–05	Northern Football Alliance	Premier Division	30	10	6	14	59	63	36	9/16	Benevolent Bowl winners
2003–04	Northern Football Alliance	Premier Division	30	11	6	13	56	60	39	10/16	
2002–03	Northern Football Alliance	Premier Division	30	12	6	12	65	52	42	6/16	
2001–02	Northern Football Alliance	Premier Division	28	12	5	11	55	48	41	7/15	
2000–01	Northern Football Alliance	Premier Division	30	14	6	10	56	46	48	6/16	
1999–2000	Northern Football Alliance	Premier Division	30	16	7	7	81	37	55	4/16	
1998–99	Northern Football Alliance	Premier Division	28	20	4	4	71	25	64	2/15	Runners-up
1997–98	Northern Football Alliance	Premier Division	28	19	2	7	87	41	59	3/15	
1996–97	Northern Football Alliance	Premier Division	32	25	3	4	109	30	78	2/17	Runners-up
1995–96	Northern Football Alliance	Premier Division	32	15	7	10	73	39	52	7/17	Benevolent Bowl winners
1994–95	Northern Football Alliance	Premier Division	28	15	6	7	64	43	51	6/15	
1993–94	Northern Football Alliance	Premier Division	30	18	5	7	80	43	59	3/16	
1992–93	Northern Football Alliance	Premier Division	30	13	6	11	71	59	45	8/16	
1991–92	Northern Football Alliance	Premier Division	30	11	7	12	55	46	40	10/16	
1990–91	Northern Football Alliance	Premier Division	28	10	7	11	44	47	37	9/15	
1989–90	Northern Football Alliance	Premier Division	28	17	3	8	62	35	54	5/15	
1988–89	Northern Football Alliance	Premier Division	28	10	5	13	55	54	35	8/15	
1987–88	Northern Football Alliance		28	9	2	17	41	67	20	13/15	
1986–87	Northern Football Alliance		30	14	6	10	46	43	34	5/16	
1985–86	Northern Football Alliance		30	11	6	13	48	49	28	10/16	
1984–85	Northern Football Alliance		28	15	5	8	60	29	35	4/15	
1983–84	Northern Football Alliance		26	7	9	10	38	38	23	9/14	

== Honours ==
=== League ===
- Northern Alliance – Premier Division
  - Champions: 2010–11
  - Runners-up: 1996–97, 1998–99

=== Cup ===
- Northumberland Senior Benevolent Bowl
  - Winners: 1995–96, 2004–05
- Northern Alliance League Cup
  - Winners: 2015–16
  - Runners-up: 1991–92, 1992–93, 1993–94, 1994–95, 1996–97, 1998–99, 2023–24
- Northern Alliance Challenge Cup
  - Winners: 2009–10, 2016–17
  - Runners-up: 1984–85, 1990–91, 1993–94, 1997–98, 2006–07, 2017–18

=== Minor titles ===
- Northern Alliance Division One Combination Cup
  - Winners: 2012–13
  - Runners-up: 2014–15

== Records ==
- Best FA Vase performance: Third Round 1992–93, 1993–94

== Junior section ==
Ponteland United is a FA Three Star Accredited Club with circa 50 junior girls and mixed teams competing in the Northumberland Football League.

=== Former notable players ===
- Bobby Clark
- Max Thompson
