= Shankhouse F.C. =

Association football club in England

Shankhouse
- Full name: Shankhouse Football Club
- Nickname: The House
- Founded: 1883
- Dissolved: 2021
- Ground: Action Park, Cramlington
Home colours

Shankhouse Football Club was a football club based in Cramlington, near Newcastle-upon-Tyne in England, between 1883 and 2021. They played at Action Park. The club was a FA Charter Standard Club affiliated to the Northumberland Football Association. The club's nickname was The House.

== History ==
The club was formed in 1883 by the local Methodist Chapel bible class after the Scottish Highland Black Watch regiment camped nearby arranged a match against the local miners, inspiring the local working class to take up the sport.

=== Co-winners of the Northumberland Senior Cup ===
The club was declared the co-winner of the Northumberland Senior Cup in 1885–86 in unique circumstances. Drawn against Morpeth Harriers F.C. in the semi-final, the two clubs played out three 1-1 draws, the first two ties both seeing Morpeth equalize with seven minutes to go.

It looked as if Shankhouse had won through at the fourth time of asking, with a late winner in the third replay, but Morpeth protested on the basis that the goal had been scored after its players heard a whistle and stopped playing, giving Shankhouse a simple goal. The whistle came from someone in the crowd. On appeal, the Football Association ruled that there had been crowd interference with the match, and scrubbed off the goal.

Therefore, the teams had to play for a fifth time, under orders to continue until the match finished. However, after three half-an-hour periods of extra-time, the game remained goalless, and it was too dark to continue.

Instead of playing a sixth game, the clubs drew lots to see who would play West End in the final, and Shankhouse drew the winning lot. However this was not to work out who won the semi-final, but to work out who would represent both clubs in the final. Shankhouse duly won 3–2, and, as a result, both Shankhouse and the Harriers were declared to be the co-holders of the Cup.

=== FA Cup and local leagues ===
In 1887 the club entered the FA Cup for the first time making it to the fourth round, before being dispatched by Aston Villa 9–0. The 1891–92 season saw the club join the Northern Football Alliance, and becoming the league winners at their first attempt. The club stayed in the Northern alliance league until the end of the 1905–06 season, when the club dropped down to the Blyth and District League.

After the Second World War, the club reentered the Northern alliance league again for the 1947–48 season, but left again after 10 seasons. Over 30 years later the club rejoined the Northern alliance league again for the 1989–90 season, starting in Division Two. The 1994–95 season saw the club move up to division one, when they qualified for promotion as runners-up. Three seasons later, the club achieved promotion to the Premier Division when they finished as champions of Division One. The 2004–05 season saw the club become league champions.

The club withdrew from the league ahead of the 2021–22 season.

== Ground ==
The club play their home games at Action Park in Cramlington. The club used to play their home games at Arcot Park, when they purchased that ground in 1906.

== Honours ==
Shankhouse's honours
Competition		Titles	Season
Northern Football Alliance	Premier Division	2	1891-92, 2004-05
Northern Football Alliance	Division One	1	1997-98
Northern Football Alliance	League Cup	2	2004-05, 2013-14
Northern Football Alliance	Challenge Cup	2	2000-01, 2001-02
Northern Football Alliance	Division Two Ameteur Cup	1	1993-94
Northumberland Senior Cup		4	1885–86, 1892–93, 1893–94, 1894–95
Northumberland FA Benevolent Bowl		2	1999–00, 2016–17
Northumberland Challenge Cup		1	1886-97

== Records ==
- FA Cup
  - Fourth Round 1887–88
