= Northumberland Senior Cup =

Newcastle Flooring Company Senior Cup
- Founded: 1884
- Region: Northumberland
- Teams: 11
- Current champions: Whitley Bay (2026)
- Most championships: Newcastle United (East End, West End, ‘A’, U23, and reserve teams, 39 wins)
- Website: Northumberland FA Senior Cup

The Northumberland Senior Cup, officially named the Newcastle Flooring Company Senior Cup, is an annual football competition held between the clubs of the Northumberland Football Association which was first played in 1884. It is the senior county cup for the historic county of Northumberland, which includes Newcastle upon Tyne and North Tyneside. The final is held at St. James' Park.

The first winners were Tyne. The current holders are Whitley Bay.

== Winners ==
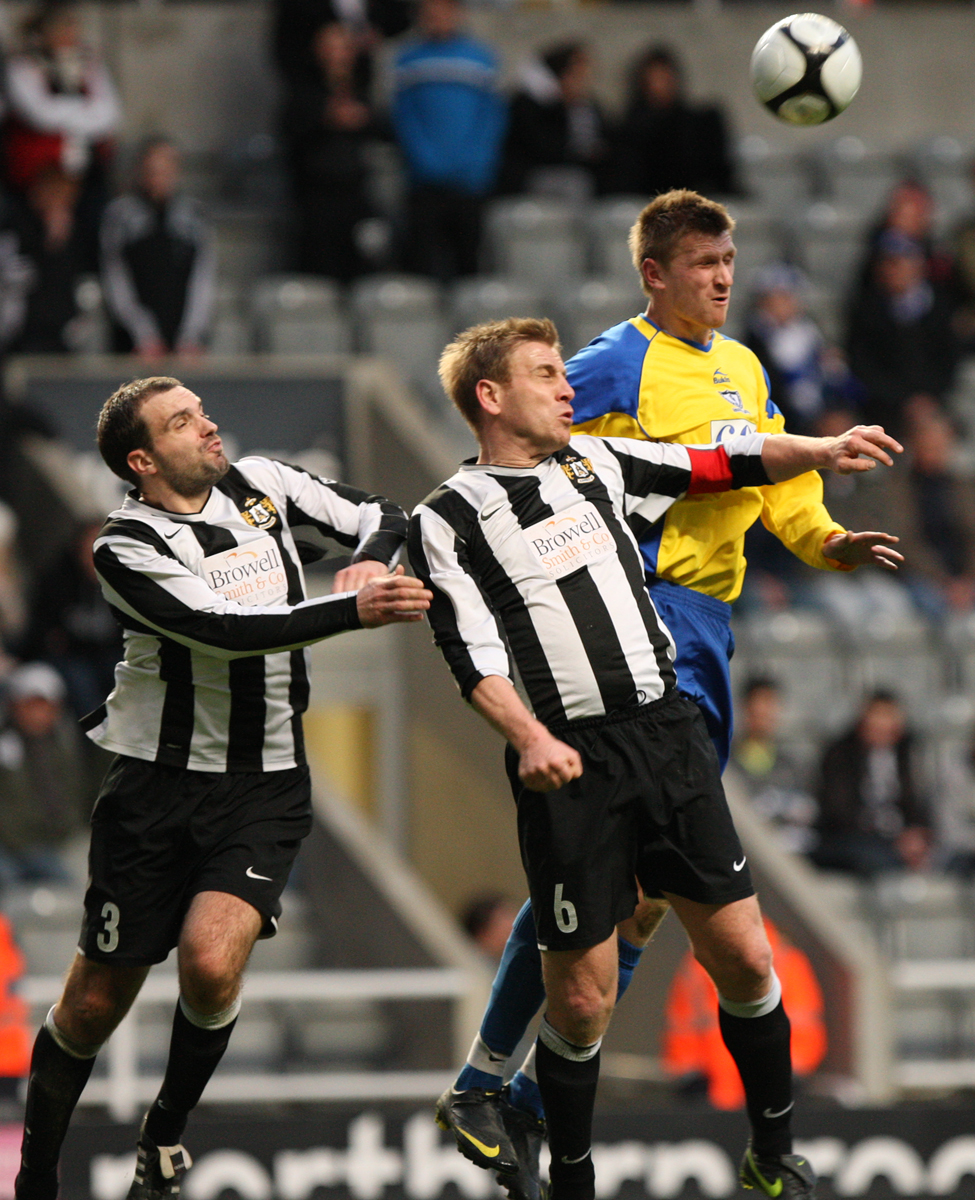
Marc Wamsley (Ashington #3), Iain Nickalls (Ashington #6) and Phil Bell (Whitley Bay) contest a ball at the Northumberland Senior Cup 2010 Final.

1884	Tyne Association	1928	Bedlington United	1976	North Shields^{5}	2017	Blyth Spartans
1885	Newcastle East End^{1}	1929	Newcastle United Reserves	1977	Blue Star Welfare^{6}	2018	Newcastle United U23
1886	Morpeth Harriers; Shankhouse	1930	Newcastle United Reserves	1978	Blyth Spartans	2019	Morpeth Town
1887	Shankhouse Black Watch^{2}	1931	Newcastle United	1979	North Shields	2022	Blyth Spartans
1888	Newcastle West End^{3}	1932	Blyth Spartans	1980	Ashington	2023	Morpeth Town
1889	Newcastle East End^{1}	1933	Ashington	1981	Blyth Spartans	2024	Newcastle United U21
1890	Newcastle West End^{3}	1934	Blyth Spartans	1982	Blyth Spartans	2025	Heaton Stannington
1891	Shankhouse Black Watch^{2}	1935	Blyth Spartans	1983	Blue Star	2026	Whitley Bay
1892	Newcastle West End^{3}	1936	Blyth Spartans	1984	Blue Star^{6}
1893	Shankhouse	1937	Blyth Spartans	1985	Blyth Spartans
1894	Shankhouse	1938	North Shields^{5}	1986	Blue Star^{6}
1895	Shankhouse	1939	Ashington A.F.C.	1987	Whitley Bay
1896	Willington Athletic	1947	Newburn	1988	Newcastle Blue Star^{6}
1897	Willington Athletic	1948	North Shields^{5}	1989	Newcastle United Reserves
1898	Newcastle United ‘A’	1949	Hexham Hearts	1990	Newcastle United Reserves
1899	Newcastle United ‘A’	1950	Ashington	1991	North Shields^{5}
1900	Seghill	1951	Cramlington Welfare	1992	Blyth Spartans
1901	Newcastle United ‘A’	1952	Blyth Spartans; Newburn	1993	Newcastle Blue Star^{6}
1902	Wallsend Park Villa^{4}	1953	Whitley Bay	1994	Blyth Spartans
1903	Morpeth Harriers	1954	North Shields^{5}	1995	Newcastle United Reserves
1904	Newcastle United ‘A’	1955	Blyth Spartans	1996	Newcastle United Reserves
1905	Newcastle United ‘A’	1956	Ashington	1997	Bedlington Terriers
1906	North Shields Athletic^{5}	1957	Ashington	1998	Bedlington Terriers
1907	Newcastle United ‘A’	1958	North Shields^{5}	1999	Newcastle United Reserves
1908	North Shields Athletic^{5}	1959	Blyth Spartans	2000	Newcastle United Reserves
1909	Newcastle United ‘A’	1960	North Shields^{5}	2001	Newcastle United Reserves
1910	Newcastle United ‘A’	1961	Whitley Bay	2002	Bedlington Terriers
1911	Newcastle United ‘A’	1962	Ashington	2003	Newcastle United Reserves
1912	Newcastle United ‘A’ North Shields Athletic^{5}	1963	Blyth Spartans	2004	Bedlington Terriers
1913	Newburn	1964	Whitley Bay	2005	Whitley Bay
1914	Blyth Spartans	1965	Whitley Bay	2006	Newcastle United Reserves
1915	Blyth Spartans	1966	North Shields^{5}	2007	Morpeth Town
1919	Walker Celtic	1967	Ashington	2008	Newcastle United Reserves
1920	Walker Celtic	1968	Whitley Bay	2009	Newcastle United Reserves
1921	Ashington	1969	Whitley Bay	2010	Whitley Bay
1922	Newcastle United Reserves	1970	Whitley Bay	2011	Newcastle United Reserves
1923	Bedlington United	1971	Whitley Bay F.C.	2012	Newcastle United Reserves
1924	Newcastle United Reserves	1972	Blyth Spartans	2013	Ashington
1925	Newcastle United Reserves	1973	Whitley Bay	2014	Newcastle United Reserves
1926	Newcastle United Reserves	1974	Blyth Spartans	2015	Blyth Spartans
1927	Newcastle United Reserves	1975	Blyth Spartans	2016	North Shields

The competition was not held between 1916 and 1918 due to World War I and between 1940 and 1946 due to World War II.

The competition was cancelled in 2019-20 and 2020-21 due to the COVID-19 pandemic.

== Notes ==
^{1} Known as Newcastle United from 1892 to present
^{2} Known as Cramlington Town from 2001 to present
^{3} Merged with Newcastle East End in 1892
^{4} Known as Wallsend from 1912 to 1933
^{5} Known as North Shields Athletic from 1908 to 1918 and 1995 to 1999, Preston Colliery from 1918 to 1928, North Shields from 1928 to 1995 and 1999 to present
^{6} Known as Newcastle Blue Star from 1930 to 1973, 1986 to 1994, and 1997 to 2009, Blue Star Welfare from 1973 to 1979, Blue Star from 1979 to 1986, RTM Newcastle from 1994 to 1997
