= Tyne Association F.C. =

Tyne Association
- Full name: Tyne Association Football Club
- Founded: 1877
- Dissolved: 1887
- Ground: Northumberland Cricket Ground, Bath Road, Newcastle
- Secretary: J. D. Challoner, A. Page
Home colours

Tyne Association F.C. was an English association football club, the first association club from Newcastle-upon-Tyne.

== History ==
The club was founded in 1877, by public schoolboys returning home from term; these included pupils from the leading association-playing teams such as Charterhouse School. Being the first club in the town, the club's early games were internal matches between its members, or matches against Northumberland Rugby Club under a mixture of codes.

In 1879–80 the club entered the FA Cup and lost 5–1 in the first round to competition favourites Blackburn Rovers, the Tyne goal being a fluke as a corner clearance hit forward J. Bruce on the back and deflected through the posts. In 1880–81, it was one of the clubs which entered the first Northumberland and Durham Association Cup, beating Corbridge 5–2 in the first round. In the semi-final Tyne lost 2–0 to eventual winners Newcastle Rangers.

Tyne's only success in the competition came in 1882–83, getting revenge on Rangers in the first round (Rangers' first defeat in the competition), and beating Sunderland in the final, thanks to second half goals from T. Redmayne and G. H. Ainslie. The growth of the competition required the local association to split into Northumberland and County Durham sections, and Tyne duly won the first Northumberland Senior Cup in 1883–84, again beating Rangers in the final, this time 4–1.

However Tyne remained amateur as other clubs in the area turned professional, and the club fell behind in the local pecking order. It did not enter the FA Cup again until 1886–87, losing once more in the first round, 4–0, to the professional side of Redcar. It was the club's last FA Cup entry, as at the end of the season the club was disbanded.

== Colours ==
The club wore amber and black halves.

== Ground ==
The club played at the Northumberland Cricket Ground in Heaton, Newcastle upon Tyne.
