= Northern Football Alliance =

Association football league in England

- Organising body: Northumberland Football Association (County Durham) Durham County Football Association
- Founded: 1890
- Country: England
- Confederation: FA
- Divisions: Premier Division (20 teams); Division One (20 teams); Division Two (22 teams); Division Three
- Number of clubs: 62
- Level on pyramid: Level 11 (Premier Division)
- Feeder to: Northern League Division Two
- Domestic cup(s): Challenge Cup; Stan Seymour League Cup
- Current champions: Burradon & New Fordley (Premier Division); Hebburn Town Reserves (Division One); Whitley Bay Sporting Club (Division Two); Prudhoe Youth Club Seniors Reserves (Division Three) (2024–25)
- Website: Official website

The Northern Football Alliance is a football league based in the North East, England. It has four divisions headed by the Premier Division, which sits at step 7 (or level 11) of the National League System.

The top club in the Premier Division is eligible for promotion to the Northern League Division Two. The top clubs in the First, Second and Third Divisions are promoted to the Premier, First, and Second Divisions respectively. The bottom club in the Third Division may be relegated to either the North Northumberland League Division One, or the Tyneside Amateur League, depending on which is more geographically appropriate.

The Northern Football Alliance was founded in 1890 as a single league, with a membership of seven teams. In 1926 it became the Second Division of the North Eastern League, but it split away again in 1935. It disbanded in 1964 due to lack of membership, but reformed just one season later, in 1965–66.

In 1988 the Northern Amateur League and the Northern Combination League combined with the Northern Football Alliance (all under the name Northern Football Alliance) to create a three-division format, which later expanded to four. Under a sponsorship agreement it is billed as the Bay Plastics Northern Football Alliance.

The league's teams chiefly come from Tyneside as well as Northumberland, with teams from further south preferring to play in the Wearside League, but there are exceptions, for example Prudhoe Town F.C. from Northumberland competed in the Wearside League, whilst Coundon and Leeholme from near Bishop Auckland in southern County Durham compete in the Alliance.

== Member teams, 2026–27 season ==
=== Premier Division ===
- Burradon & New Fordley
- Cramlington United
- Gateshead Rutherford
- Gosforth Bohemians
- Haltwhistle Jubilee
- Hazlerigg Victory
- Heaton Stannington 'A'
- Hebburn Town Reserves
- Killingworth
- Newcastle Chemfica
- Newcastle East End
- North Shields Athletic
- Ponteland United
- Seaton Delaval AFC
- Wallington
- Wallsend Boys Club
- West Moor & Jesmond

=== Division One ===
- Bedlington
- Hexham
- Morpeth
- Newcastle Benfield Reserves
- Newcastle Independent
- Newcastle University 'A'
- North Shields Athletic Reserves
- North Sunderland
- Percy Main Amateurs
- Rothbury
- Stobswood Welfare
- Whitley Bay Sporting Club
- Willington Quay Saints
- Winlaton Community
- Wrekenton Blue Star

=== Division Two ===
- AFC Newbiggin Reserves
- Blyth Rangers
- Blyth Town Reserves
- Cramlington Town Independent
- Ellington
- FC United of Newcastle
- Forest Hall
- Gosforth Bohemians Reserves
- Great Park
- Killingworth Reserves
- Newcastle Chemfica Amateurs
- Prudhoe Youth Club Seniors Reserves
- Red House Farm Seniors
- Wallsend Boys Club Reserves
- Whickham Reserves

=== Division Three ===
- Bedlington United
- Blaydon Community
- Ellington Development
- Forest Hall United
- Gateshead Borough FC
- Hadrian
- Heddon United
- Killingworth Reserves
- Lemington FC
- Newbiggin Reds
- Newcastle East End Reserves
- North East Sporting Club
- Ponteland United Development
- Walkergate XI

Newcastle Westgate Seniors

== Champions (1890–1988) ==
- 1890–91 – Sunderland "A"
- 1891–92 – Shankhouse
- 1892–93 – Sunderland "A"
- 1893–94 – Sunderland "A"
- 1894–95 – Sunderland "A"
- 1895–96 – Sunderland "A"
- 1896–97 – Hebburn Argyle
- 1897–98 – Newcastle United "A"
- 1898–99 – Jarrow
- 1899–1900 – Willington Athletic
- 1900–01 – Newcastle United "A"
- 1901–02 – Newcastle United "A"
- 1902–03 – Morpeth Harriers
- 1903–04 – Wallsend Park Villa
- 1904–05 – Willington Athletic
- 1905–06 – Willington Athletic
- 1906–07 – North Shields Athletic
- 1907–08 – North Shields Athletic
- 1908–09 – Blyth Spartans
- 1909–10 – Willington Athletic
- 1910–11 – Newburn
- 1911–12 – Newburn
- 1912–13 – Blyth Spartans
- 1913–14 – Ashington
- 1914–15 – Spen Black & Whites
- 1915–19 – Not competed for due to World War I
- 1919–20 – Annfield Plain
- 1920–21 – Chopwell Institute
- 1921–22 – Felling Colliery
- 1922–23 – Annfield Plain
- 1923–24 – Birtley
- 1924–25 – Ashington Reserves
- 1925–26 – Chilton Colliery Recreation
- 1926–27 – Consett
- 1927–28 – Washington Colliery
- 1928–29 – North Shields
- 1929–30 – Walker Celtic
- 1930–31 – Chopwell Institute
- 1931–32 – Crawcrook Albion
- 1932–33 – Eden Colliery Welfare
- 1933–34 – Throckley Welfare
- 1934–35 – Newbiggin West End
- 1935–36 – Hexham Town
- 1936–37 – Stakeford Albion
- 1937–38 – Alnwick
- 1938–39 – Newcastle United "A"
- 1939–46 – Not competed for due to World War II
- 1946–47 – Newburn
- 1947–48 – Hexham Hearts
- 1948–49 – Cramlington Welfare
- 1949–50 – West Sleekburn
- 1950–51 – Cramlington Welfare
- 1951–52 – Newburn
- 1952–53 – Whitley Bay Athletic
- 1953–54 – Whitley Bay Athletic
- 1954–55 – Amble
- 1955–56 – Ashington Reserves
- 1956–57 – Amble
- 1957–58 – Newcastle United "A"
- 1958–59 – Amble
- 1959–60 – Amble
- 1960–61 – Amble
- 1961–62 – Newburn
- 1962–63 – Alnwick Town
- 1963–64 – Alnwick Town
- 1964–65 – not competed
- 1965–66 – Alnwick Town
- 1966–67 – Bedlington Colliery Welfare
- 1967–68 – Alnwick Town
- 1968–69 – Alnwick Town
- 1969–70 – Alnwick Town
- 1970–71 – Alnwick Town
- 1971–72 – Alnwick Town
- 1972–73 – Marine Park
- 1973–74 – Marine Park
- 1974–75 – South Shields Mariners
- 1975–76 – South Shields
- 1976–77 – Wallington
- 1977–78 – Brandon United
- 1978–79 – Brandon United
- 1979–80 – Guisborough Town
- 1980–81 – Percy Main Amateurs
- 1981–82 – Percy Main Amateurs
- 1982–83 – Darlington Cleveland Bridge
- 1983–84 – Morpeth Town
- 1984–85 – Dudley Welfare
- 1985–86 – Gateshead Tyne Sports
- 1986–87 – West Allotment Celtic
- 1987–88 – Seaton Delaval Seaton Terrace

== Divisional Champions (since 1988) ==
Season	Premier Division	Division One	Division Two
1988–89	Seaton Delaval Seaton Terrace	Ashington Premier	Blyth Kitty Brewster
1989–90	Seaton Delaval Amateurs	Westerhope Hillheads	Heaton Corner House
1990–91	West Allotment Celtic	Blyth Kitty Brewster	Procter & Gamble
1991–92	West Allotment Celtic	Carlisle City	St Columbas
1992–93	Seaton Delaval Amateurs	Longbenton	Amble Town
1993–94	Morpeth Town	Amble Town	Ashington Hirst Progressive
1994–95	Newcastle Benfield Park	Amble Town	Walker Ledwood
1995–96	Seaton Delaval	Gosforth Bohemians	Walbottle Masons
1996–97	Lemington Social	Ryton	Northbank
1997–98	West Allotment Celtic	Shankhouse	Coxlodge S C
1998–99	West Allotment Celtic	Percy Main Amateurs	Amble Vikings
1999–2000	West Allotment Celtic	Coxlodge S C	Harraby Catholic Club
2000–01	Walker Central	Amble Vikings	Wallington
2001–02	West Allotment Celtic	Bedlington Terriers "A"	Haydon Bridge
2002–03	Newcastle Benfield Saints	Chopwell Top Club	Blyth Town
2003–04	West Allotment Celtic	Heddon	Alnmouth
2004–05	Shankhouse	Alnmouth	Ashington Colliers
2005–06	Team Northumbria	Wallsend	Whitley Bay "A"
2006–07	Harraby Catholic Club	Gillford Park Spartans	Westerhope
2007–08	Walker Central	Wark	Killingworth Y P C
2008–09	Walker Central	Killingworth Y P C	Amble United
2009–10	Harraby Catholic Club	Gateshead Rutherford	North Shields Athletic
2010–11	Ponteland United	Hebburn Reyrolle	Newcastle Chemfica Independent
2011–12	Heaton Stannington	Amble United	Hexham
2012–13	Heaton Stannington	Wallington	North Shields Athletic
2013-14	Blyth Town	North Shields Athletic	Blyth Isabella
2014–15	Blyth Town	Percy Main Amateurs	Shilbottle Colliery Welfare
2015–16	Blyth Town	Shilbottle Colliery Welfare	Gateshead FC A
2016-17	Killingworth Town	Gateshead FC A	Killingworth YPC
2017-18	Newcastle University	Killingworth YPC	Blyth Spartans Reserves
2018-19	AFC Killingworth	Blyth Town	Rothbury
2019-20 & 2020-21	Not awarded due to Covid-19 Pandemic	Not awarded due to Covid-19 Pandemic	Not awarded due to Covid-19 Pandemic

== Divisional Champions (4 Divisions since 2021) ==
Season	Premier Division	Division One	Division Two	Division Three
2021-22	Killingworth	Newcastle Independent	Stobswood Welfare	Blaydon Community
2022-23	Newcastle Blue Star	Stobswood Welfare	Ponteland United Reserves	Hazelrigg Victory
2023-24	Wallington	Gosforth Bohemians	Heaton Stannington 'A'	Cramlington Town Independent
2024-25	Burradon & New Fordley	Hebburn Town Reserves	Whitley Bay Sporting Club	Prudhoe Youth Club Seniors Reserves
