= Percy Main Amateurs F.C. =

Association football club in England

Coordinates: 54.9986°N 1.4717°W

- Full name: Percy Main Amateurs Football Club
- Nickname: The Villagers
- Founded: 1913
- Ground: Purvis Park, St. John's Green Percy Main
- Capacity: 1,500
- Manager: Rob Blackburn
- League: Northern Alliance Division One
- 2025–26: Northern Alliance Division One, 10th of 15
Home colours

Percy Main Amateurs Football Club is a football club based in Percy Main in Tyne and Wear, England. They are currently members of the Northern Alliance Division One and play at Purvis Park.

== History ==
The club was established in 1913, joining the newly formed North Shields & District Junior League, a competition for 14 - 16 year olds, one of three teams from the village, along with Percy Main Black Watch and Percy Main Celtic. The first season was to see the team finish as runners-up to Preston Colliery Athletic, losing 0 - 1 in the Championship play-off at the fourth attempt following three drawn games! Next season,1914 - 15, the Amateurs entered the Shields & District Church League 'B' Division and finished the season as Champions, while also winning the league's Knock-out Competition by defeating South Shields Wenlock in the final at Green Lane by 3 - 1. By now, war was beginning to take its toll as throughout the season, teams began to lose staff and players and had to fold. Season 1915 - 16 saw Percy Main Amateurs playing only in occasional friendly matches. For 1916 - 17, Percy Main Amateurs joined the South Shields & District League, with the club adding a second side, Percy Main Amateurs 'A', playing in the North Shields Junior Alliance. This league was for ages between 15 - 17 but again, war badly impacted the league and 16 teams in January 1917 had reduced to 12 teams by mid-February. The season following, 1917 - 18, saw Percy Main Amateurs back to a single team, competing in the North Shields & District Junior League. The team included players from both Percy Main Amateurs and Percy Main Amateurs 'A' and some who had represented both sides, details are, understandably, hard to come by, however. Season 1918 - 19 is also, sadly, under recorded, however, Percy Main Amateurs were playing in the South Shields & District League. This season also saw the beginning of Percy Main Amateurs long tradition of appearing in charitable fund-raising games and two were held during the season. In November 1918 against Palmers (Jarrow) and in May 1919 against Cullercoats at Hawkey's Lane, to raise funds for the family of a local soldier who was lost in action. For the season 1919 - 20, the club was bolstered by demobilised soldiers returning after fighting in World War I. They joined the Northern Amateur League, going on to win the league title in their first season. They were also winners of the Northumberland Minor Cup, beating Byker St. Lawrence 2–1 in the final at Croft Park in Blyth in front of a crowd of around 5,000. A special train had been put on to bring fans up from Percy Main. Although tradition has the club's colours as claret and blue, at that time they were blue and white. The Northern Amateur League was won again the following season, with the club also winning the Tynemouth War Memorial Shield, defeating Whitley Athletic 2–1 after extra time at Hawkey's Lane before a crowd of almost 6,000. Following these initial successes, the club made an application to join the Northern Alliance, but were rejected. The club were subsequently runners-up in the league, the league cup and the Tynemouth Dispensary Cup in 1921–22. The following season saw them win the Tynemouth Dispensary Cup Final with a 1–0 win over New York United.

Percy Main were then accepted into the Northern Alliance. However, they returned to the Northern Amateur League the following year due to the cost of travelling. They then won the Amateur League twice in the next four years, before moving to the Tyneside League in 1929. In October 1929, the club won the Amateur Shield at the North East Coast Exhibition in Newcastle upon Tyne, beating Stockton 3–1 in the final at St. James' Park They also reached the quarter-finals of the FA Amateur Cup in 1929–30, and were runners-up in the Tyneside League in 1932–33. In 1936–37 the club finished bottom of the league, which they left at the end of the following season, returning to the Northern Amateur League.

In 1968 Percy Main rejoined the Northern Alliance, and in 1971–72 they won the League Cup. They were champions in 1980–81 and retained the title the following season. Although the club were runners-up the following season, they went into gradual decline, and were relegated from the Premier Division to Division One at the end of the 1990–91 season. In 1998–99 they were Division One champions, earning promotion back to the Premier Division. The club won the League Cup for a second time the following season, but were relegated to Division One again at the end of the 2005–06 season after finishing bottom of the Premier Division. They were Division One runners-up in 2009–10, resulting in another promotion to the Premier Division. Although the club were relegated again in 2013–14, they won Division One at the first attempt to earn an immediate promotion back to the Premier Division. Towards the end of the 2020–21 season, following two seasons which were curtailed due to the ongoing COVID-19 pandemic, the club announced its intention to resign from the Northern Alliance and fold at the conclusion of the remaining games, citing a lack of volunteers and the funds required for the necessary upgrade to the facilities at Purvis Park. This generated a huge amount of regional interest and about three weeks later and because of some additional fund raising efforts and some extra help behind the scenes, the resignation was withdrawn and plans were put in place to begin work on the improvements to the pitch and pavilion.

== Ground ==
The club's ground was originally named Middle Row Park. In September 1925 a new dressing pavilion was opened. Although this was badly damaged by fire in early 1927, the club rebuilt it in time for the start of the 1927–28 season. The ground and facilities have long been admired and local clubs have been keen to make use of them when faced with difficulties at their own grounds. North Shields, then of the Wearside League, shared the ground from December 1992 until the end of that season. Then North Shields St. Columba's, another Northern Alliance club, were allowed to share for six seasons, from the start of the 1993/94 season, until the end of the 1998/99 season, after their own facilities were vandalised. In 1995 the ground was renamed Purvis Park after Alan Purvis, a former player, treasurer, secretary and chairman who spent over 50 years at the club.

== Club officials ==
- President: Colin Revel
- Vice-Presidents: Alan Fletcher, Ernie Beasley
- Chairman: Paul Springett
- Secretary: Norman de Bruin
- Treasurer: Jack Bowden
- Manager: Rob Blackburn
- Assistant Manager: Gary Newbrook
- Coach: Chris Reay
- Committee: Bob Rodgerson, George Mooney, Steve Hurd, Jack Bowden, Julie Hurd, Keith Bell.
- Club Captain: Cam Inglis
- Club Historian: Keith Bell

== Honours ==
- Northern Football Alliance
  - Champions 1980–81, 1981–82
  - Division One champions 1998–99, 2014–15
  - League Cup winners 1971–72, 1999–2000
  - Combination Cup winners 2009–10, 2025-26
- Northern Amateur League
  - Champions 1919–20, 1920–21, 1925–26, 1927–28, 1947–48, 1963–64, 1964-65 (tied)
  - League Challenge Cup winners 1925–26, 1967–68
- Northumberland Amateur Cup
  - Winners 1967–68, 1969–70, 1970–71
- Northumberland Minor Cup
  - Winners 1919–20
- Tynemouth War Memorial Shield
  - Winners 1920–21
- Tynemouth Dispensary Cup
  - Winners 1922–23, 1930–31, 1931–32
- Willington Quay Nursing Association Cup
  - Winners 1929–30
- South-East Northumberland Hospitals Cup
  - Winners 1963–64 (joint), 1966–67, 1974–75
- North Tyneside Hospitals Cup
  - Winners 1977–78, 1979–80, 1981–82, 1982–83
- Northumberland Senior Benevolent Bowl
  - Winners 1977–78, 2003–04, 2010–11
- North East Coast Exhibition Amateur Football Shield
  - Winners 1929–30

== Records ==
- Best FA Cup performance: Preliminary round, 1982–83
- Best FA Amateur Cup performance: Quarter-finals, 1929–30
- Best FA Vase performance: Fifth round, 1982–83

=== Results ===
- Record Win – 18-0 (v. North Shields YMCA 1967 - Northumberland F.A. Minor Cup)
- Record Defeat – 0-14 (v. Wallington F.C. 2022 - Northern Alliance)

== See also ==
- Percy Main Amateurs F.C. players
