= Alnwick Town A.F.C. =

Association football club in England

Coordinates: 55°24′11.28″N 1°41′58.83″W

Alnwick Town
- Full name: Alnwick Town Association Football Club
- Nicknames: Magpies, The Wick
- Founded: 1879
- Ground: St James' Park, Alnwick
- Capacity: 2,500
- Chairman: Tommy McKie
- Manager: Andy Waugh
- League: Northern League Division Two
- 2025–26: Northern League Division Two, 8th of 22
| Home colours | Away colours |

Alnwick Town Association Football Club is a football club based in Alnwick, Northumberland, England. They are currently members of the Northern League Division Two and play at St James' Park.

== History ==
The club were established in 1879 as Alnwick United Services. They joined the North Northumberland League, winning it in 1898–99. In 1900 they were renamed Alnwick United Juniors. In 1923 they joined the East Northumberland League, before switching to the Northern Alliance in 1935. The following year the club adopted its current name, and in 1937–38 won the Northern Alliance for the first time. During the 1960s and early 1970s they enjoyed a sustained period of success, after finishing as runners-up in the Northern Alliance in 1959–60 and 1961–62, they won the league title in 1962–63, 1963–64, 1965–66, 1967–68, 1968–69, 1969–70, 1970–71 and 1971–72, and were runners-up in the league in 1966–67 and 1972–73. The club also won the league's Challenge Cup in 1961–62, 1965–66, 1967–68, 1968–69 and 1970–71.

In 1982 the club joined the Northern League, becoming members of the new Division Two. In 1988–89 they were runners-up, earning promotion to Division One. However, after finishing eighth in their first season in Division One, they were second from bottom in 1990–91, resulting in relegation back to Division Two. The club remained in Division Two until 2006–07 when they finished bottom of the table and were relegated back to the Premier Division of the Northern Alliance. The club won the league's Subsidiary Cup in 2008–09. After finishing as runners-up in the Northern Alliance in 2010–11, they were promoted to Division Two of Northern League. In 2017–18 they finished bottom of Division Two and were relegated back to the Northern Alliance. In 2022–23 the club won the Northern Alliance League Cup, beating Burradon & New Fordley 5–2 in the final. The following season saw the club retain the trophy, beating Ponteland United 1–0 in the final. They also finished as runners-up in the Northern Alliance Premier Division, earning promotion to Division Two of the Northern League.

=== League history ===
| Season | Division | Position | Significant events |
|---|---|---|---|
| 1898–99 | North Northumberland League | 1 | Champions |
| 1899–00 | North Northumberland League | | |
| 1900–01 | North Northumberland League | | |
| 1901–02 | North Northumberland League | | |
| 1902–03 | North Northumberland League | | |
| 1903–04 | North Northumberland League | | |
| 1904–05 | North Northumberland League | | |
| 1905–06 | North Northumberland League | | |
| 1906–07 | North Northumberland League | | |
| 1907–08 | North Northumberland League | | |
| 1908–09 | North Northumberland League | | |
| 1909–10 | North Northumberland League | | |
| 1910–11 | North Northumberland League | | |
| 1911–12 | Coquetdale League | 4/8 | Renamed Alnwick Town |
| 1912–13 | Wansbeck League | | |
| 1913–14 | Wansbeck League | | |
| 1919–20 | North Northumberland League | | Renamed Alnwick United |
| 1920–21 | North Northumberland League South Division | | |
| 1921–22 | North Northumberland League South Division | | |
| 1922–23 | Ashington & District League | | |
| 1923–24 | Ashington & District League | | |
| 1924–25 | Ashington & District League | | |
| 1925–26 | North Northumberland League | 5/12 | |
| 1926–27 | North Northumberland League | 2/9 | |
| 1927–28 | Coquetdale League | 4/12 | |
| 1928–29 | Coquetdale League Eastern Division | | |
| 1929–30 | Coquetdale League Eastern Division | 6/13 | |
| 1930–31 | North Northumberland League Division One | 8/13 | |
| 1931–32 | North Northumberland League Division One | 7/11 | |
| 1932–33 | North Northumberland League Division One | 10/10 | |
| 1933–34 | North Northumberland League Division One | 4/12 | |
| 1934–35 | North Northumberland League Division One | 3/10 | |
| 1935–36 | North Northumberland League Division One | 7/12 | |
| 1936–37 | Northern Alliance | 5/16 | Renamed Alnwick Town |
| 1937–38 | Northern Alliance | 1/17 | Champions |
| 1938–39 | Northern Alliance | 6/18 | |
| 1939–40 | Northern Alliance | - | Withdrew - Outbreak of World War 2 |
| 1946–47 | Northern Alliance | 6/16 | |
| 1947–48 | Northern Alliance | 6/18 | |
| 1948–49 | Northern Alliance | 11/17 | |
| 1949–50 | Northern Alliance | 11/18 | |
| 1950–51 | Northern Alliance | 9/18 | |
| 1951–52 | Northern Alliance | 12/17 | |
| 1952–53 | Northern Alliance | 8/18 | |
| 1953–54 | Northern Alliance | 5/18 | |
| 1954–55 | Northern Alliance | 15/17 | |
| 1955–56 | Northern Alliance | 12/18 | |
| 1956–57 | Northern Alliance | 3/18 | |
| 1957–58 | Northern Alliance | 7/17 | |
| 1958–59 | Northern Alliance | 11/18 | |
| 1959–60 | Northern Alliance | 2/16 | |
| 1960–61 | Northern Alliance | 11/18 | |
| 1961–62 | Northern Alliance | 2/17 | |
| 1962–63 | Northern Alliance | 1/14 | Champions |
| 1963–64 | Northern Alliance | 1/11 | Champions |
| 1964–65 | Durham Central League | | |
| 1965–66 | Northern Alliance | 1/14 | Champions |
| 1966–67 | Northern Alliance | 2/16 | |
| 1967–68 | Northern Alliance | 1/14 | Champions |
| 1968–69 | Northern Alliance | 1/12 | Champions |
| 1969–70 | Northern Alliance | 1/12 | Champions |
| 1970–71 | Northern Alliance | 1/11 | Champions |
| 1971–72 | Northern Alliance | 1/11 | Champions |
| 1972–73 | Northern Alliance | 2/14 | |
| 1973–74 | Northern Alliance | 5/15 | |
| 1974–75 | Northern Alliance | 4/17 | |
| 1975–76 | Northern Alliance | 8/15 | |
| 1976–77 | Northern Alliance | 8/16 | |
| 1977–78 | Northern Alliance | 10/17 | |
| 1978–79 | Northern Alliance | 14/18 | |
| 1979–80 | Northern Alliance | 14/15 | |
| 1980–81 | Northern Alliance | 14/16 | |
| 1981–82 | Northern Alliance | 17/18 | |
| 1982–83 | Northern League Division Two | 11/11 | |
| 1983–84 | Northern League Division Two | 14/18 | |
| 1984–85 | Northern League Division Two | 14/18 | |
| 1985–86 | Northern League Division Two | 10/20 | |
| 1986–87 | Northern League Division Two | 6/19 | |
| 1987–88 | Northern League Division Two | 6/18 | |
| 1988–89 | Northern League Division Two | 2/20 | Promoted |
| 1989–90 | Northern League Division One | 8/20 | |
| 1990–91 | Northern League Division One | 19/20 | Relegated |
| 1991–92 | Northern League Division Two | 9/20 | |
| 1992–93 | Northern League Division Two | 9/20 | |
| 1993–94 | Northern League Division Two | 15/19 | |
| 1994–95 | Northern League Division Two | 17/19 | |
| 1995–96 | Northern League Division Two | 16/19 | |
| 1996–97 | Northern League Division Two | 15/19 | |
| 1997–98 | Northern League Division Two | 9/19 | |
| 1998–99 | Northern League Division Two | 12/19 | |
| 1999–00 | Northern League Division Two | 11/19 | |
| 2000–01 | Northern League Division Two | 14/19 | |
| 2001–02 | Northern League Division Two | 13/20 | |
| 2002–03 | Northern League Division Two | 15/20 | |
| 2003–04 | Northern League Division Two | 11/20 | |
| 2004–05 | Northern League Division Two | 12/20 | |
| 2005–06 | Northern League Division Two | 16/20 | |
| 2006–07 | Northern League Division Two | 21/21 | Relegated |
| 2007–08 | Northern Alliance Premier Division | 14/16 | |
| 2008–09 | Northern Alliance Premier Division | 5/17 | |
| 2009–10 | Northern Alliance Premier Division | 11/17 | |
| 2010–11 | Northern Alliance Premier Division | 2/17 | Promoted |
| 2011–12 | Northern League Division Two | 16/22 | |
| 2012–13 | Northern League Division Two | 21/22 | |
| 2013–14 | Northern League Division Two | 18/22 | |
| 2014–15 | Northern League Division Two | 16/22 | |
| 2015–16 | Northern League Division Two | 17/22 | |
| 2016–17 | Northern League Division Two | 15/21 | |
| 2017–18 | Northern League Division Two | 21/21 | Relegated |
| 2018–19 | Northern Alliance Premier Division | 9/16 | |
| 2019–20 | Northern Alliance Premier Division | – | Season abandoned due to COVID-19 pandemic |
| 2020–21 | Northern Alliance Premier Division | – | Season abandoned due to COVID-19 pandemic |
| 2021–22 | Northern Alliance Premier Division | 9/16 | |
| 2022–23 | Northern Alliance Premier Division | 4/16 | |
| 2023–24 | Northern Alliance Premier Division | 2/16 | Promoted |
| 2024–25 | Northern League Division Two | 10/22 | |
| 2025–26 | Northern League Division Two | 8/22 | |

== Other teams ==
The club's reserve team joined Division Two of the Northern Alliance in 2011, having previously played in the North Northumberland League. In 2015 they returned to the North Northumberland League. Although the reserve team subsequently dropped out of the league, they returned in 2017. At the end of the 2017–18 season the team were rebranded as the Development Squad. When the league folded in 2019, the team transferred to the North East Combination League. When the North Northumberland League was revived in 2020, the Development Squad rejoined. They were champions in 2020–21, after which they moved up to Division Three of the Northern Alliance. The Development Squad folded ahead of the 2023–24 season after being promoted from Division Three of the Northern Alliance.

Alnwick Town Ladies play in the North East Regional Women's League Premier Division. They previously won the Northumberland County League and Cup, before being promoted to the North East Regional Women's League Northern Division and then the Premier Division.

== Ground ==
The club moved to St James' Park in 1900.

== Honours ==
- Northern Alliance
  - Champions 1937–38, 1962–63, 1963–64, 1965–66, 1967–68, 1968–69, 1969–70, 1970–71, 1971–72
  - League Cup winners 2022–23, 2023–24
  - Challenge Cup winners 1961–62, 1965–66, 1967–68, 1968–69, 1970–71
  - Charity Cup winners 1980–81, 2008–09
- Durham Central League
  - League Cup winners 1964–65
- North Northumberland League
  - Champions 1898–99
- Northumberland Senior Benevolent Bowl
  - Winners 1986–87, 2009–10
- Northumberland Amateur Cup
  - Winners 1971–72
- North Northumberland Minor Cup
  - Winners 1903–04
- Aged Miners Homes Cup
  - Winners 1936–37, 1958–59
- Ashington Hospital Cup
  - Winners 1922–23

== Records ==
- Best FA Cup performance: Third qualifying round, 1951–52, 1957–58
- Best FA Trophy performance: Third qualifying round, 1990–91
- Best FA Vase performance: Second round, 1975–76, 2014–15

== See also ==
- Alnwick Town A.F.C. players
