= Prudhoe Town F.C. =

Association football club in England

Coordinates: 54°58′00.26″N 1°50′00.78″W

Prudhoe Town
- Full name: Prudhoe Town Football Club
- Nickname(s): The Citizens
- Founded: 1959 (as Ovington)
- Ground: Essity Park, Prudhoe
- 2017–18: Wearside League (withdrew)
Home colours	Away colours

Prudhoe Town Football Club was a football club based in Prudhoe, Northumberland, England. The club is affiliated to the Northumberland Football Association. They play at Essity Park.

== History ==
The club was formed in 1959 and originally played in the Hexham & District League as Ovington F.C.. They moved upwards through the Newcastle & District League, the Northern Combination, and the Northern Amateur League before joining the Northern Alliance in 1984 as Prudhoe East End.

Twice Northern Alliance runners-up, they joined the Northern League in 1988, spending all but two seasons of their period in the league in Division Two. Promotion was earned in the 1993–94 and 2001–02 seasons, but on each occasion they were relegated after a solitary season in Division One. They adopted their present name in 1994. They stayed in the Northern League, until 2009 when they resigned and joined the Wearside Football League, where they remained until resigning during the 2017–18 season. In 2019, Prudhoe merged with Prudhoe Youth Club.

== Ground ==
Prudhoe Town played their home games at Essity Park, Broomhouse Road, Prudhoe, NE42 5EH. The club's future was put in doubt after the loss of this ground officially.

== Honours ==
- Northern League Division Two :
  - Runners-up (1): 2001–02
- Northern Alliance:
  - Runners-up (2): 1985–86, 1987–88

== Records ==
- Highest League Position: 19th in Northern League Division one 2002–03
- FA Cup best performance: Second Round Qualifying – 1990–91
- FA Trophy best performance: First Round Qualifying – 1994–95
- FA Vase best performance: Third Round – 1995–96

== Former players ==
A list of players that have played for the club at one stage and meet one of the following criteria;

1. Players that have played/managed in the football league or any foreign equivalent to this level (i.e. fully professional league).
2. Players with full international caps.
- (England) Jeff Wright
