= Newcastle Blue Star F.C. =

Newcastle Blue Star FC
- Full name: Newcastle Blue Star Football Club
- Nicknames: The Aristocrats; The Star
- Founded: 1930; 96 years ago 2018 (refounded)
- Ground: Scotswood, Newcastle upon Tyne
- Coordinates: 54°58′27″N 1°41′43″W
- Chairman: Stephen Best
- Manager: Vacant
- League: Northern League Division One
- 2025–26: Northern League Division One, 6th of 19
Home colours	Away colours

Newcastle Blue Star F.C. is a football club based in Newcastle upon Tyne, England. It was established in 1930 and joined the Wearside League in 1973. In 1978, the club won the FA Vase. They won promotion to the Northern Premier League Premier Division at the end of the 2008–09 season via the play-offs, however off field troubles led to the club having to wind up, having never taken its place in the league. In 2018 the club was reborn from renaming club Hazlerigg Victory and bringing with it their players and management staff, playing matches at Scotswood in the West End of the city. The club currently play in the Northern League Division One, the ninth tier of the English football league system.

== History ==
Formed in 1930 as Newcastle Blue Star, the club was entered into the Newcastle Business Houses League two years later. The club would play in this league for six seasons before moving onto the North East Amateur League. Spells in the Tyneside Amateur League and Northern Combination would follow.

In 1973, under the name Blue Star Welfare, the club had advanced to the Wearside League. It was crowned champions during its first season in the league. It repeated the success in the 1975–76 season adding the championship to its name again. In 1978 the club marked its most notable achievement to date, winning the FA Vase, beating Barton Rovers 2-1 in the final at Wembley Stadium.

By the 1979 season, the club had re-named as simply Blue Star. The early 1980s was a successful time for the club. It won the Wearside League in three consecutive seasons. Around this time it also reached the First Round proper of the FA Cup, knocked out by York City, losing 2–0 at Bootham Crescent.

In 1992, a consortium placed a pre-emptive bid to buy cash-strapped Fourth Division side Maidstone United with the intention of moving the club to the north-east and merging it with Blue Star, thus giving Blue Star League football. The bid was rejected by Maidstone chairman Jim Thompson.

=== Northern League era ===
The club entered into the Northern League Division Two for the 1985–86 season, emphatically winning it. It won 36 out of 38 games, only dropping points in two games (one a draw, the other a loss). Also in that season, the club scored a very high 133 goals. In 1986, the name was reverted to its original title of Newcastle Blue Star.

Newcastle Blue Star had moved up to the Northern League Division One and came very close to winning it in 1987–88. By the early 1990s, the club had a slump in the league, finishing generally in the lower half of the table. From 1994 until 1998, the club was known as RTM Newcastle, soon changing it back to Newcastle Blue Star.

The club was relegated to Division Two for the 1999–00 season, but bounced straight back up with a runners-up spot. Unable to regain the form of previous years, Newcastle spent three seasons in the lower regions of the table, the last of which was a bottom place finish and subsequent relegation.

In 2004–05, Newcastle Blue Star was promoted into the Northern League Division One after ending the season in third place. Under the management of Eric Tait, Blue Star had a fantastic return to Division One, winning it for the first time and also completing the double by winning the Northern League Cup. Unfortunately for the club, it was not promoted because their Wheatsheaf Ground did not meet required league standards.

=== 2007–2009 ===
It was announced as of the 2007–08 season that Blue Star would share the 10,200 capacity Kingston Park stadium with rugby side Newcastle Falcons. The ground change allowed the club to progress to the Northern Premier League Division One North which stands at level 8 on the football pyramid.

In September 2007, Tommy Cassidy was appointed manager, joining from Workington. As of March 2008, Workington were still claiming £10,000 compensation.

On 8 March 2008, Newcastle Blue Star asked the FA if they could take the place of the relegated team in the league. The reason being that the costs of playing in this division were too high, and this could be due to the fact that they are the only Newcastle based team in the division, and at least 9 of the opposing teams are in the Manchester area, meaning the team have to pay for a coach to every away game, and paying costs for the visitors at a home game. The Northern League (the feeder division that Newcastle came from) had said that they would welcome the team back. This was confirmed on 26 March that Blue Star would be relegated in place of the bottom placed team in the league. However, on 4 April it was announced that the league allowed Blue Star to stay in the Northern Premier League as they had withdrawn their request.

On 26 March 2008, the club announced Paul Baker as the club's new manager. He succeeded Tommy Cassidy who left the club to pursue management at a higher level than the proposed drop back to Northern League offered.

On Wednesday 9 April 2008, Newcastle Blue Star scored two goals in the first 47 seconds of their 3–0 win over Bamber Bridge. This is believed to be a world record.

In the 2008–09 season, Newcastle Blue Star finished 3rd in the Northern Premier League Division One North but were promoted to the Northern Premier League Premier Division after a 4–1 victory over Curzon Ashton at Kingston Park in the Play-off final.

On Monday 11 May 2009, it was announced that the club was facing the possibility of folding after being hit with a demand to repay £65,000 of loans previously made by the Football Stadia Improvement Fund to improve the club's former Wheatsheaf Ground; this on the basis that the club was no longer playing there. Although it was offered the option of repaying the debt in instalments, the club chose to cease operations in June 2009.

=== 2018 reformation ===
In 2018, a local businessman saw fit to reform the club, with teams from U8 through to seniors, taking over the established Hazlerigg Victory Football Club. The current Newcastle Blue Star play at Scotswood, in the West End of the city. The club is located next door to the sports centre and boxing club, also known as Grainger Park. The clubhouse was named the Sir Bobby Robson Lounge and was officially opened in October 2018 by his widow, Lady Elsie Robson.

In May 2023 and after winning the Northern Football Alliance, Blue Star were promoted back to the Northern League Division Two. Having finished in second in the 2023–24 season, the club were promoted as one of the losing play-off finalists with the best points-per-game record across step six nationwide.

== Players ==
As of 26 February 2025.

Note: Flags indicate national team as defined under FIFA eligibility rules; some limited exceptions apply. Players may hold more than one non-FIFA nationality.

No.	Pos.	Nation	Player
—	GK		Daniel Lister
—	GK		Michael Hogan
—	DF		Craig Scott
—	DF		Connor Macleod
—	DF		Jake Cunningham
—	DF		Harry Barclay
—	DF		Spencer Ashcroft
—	DF		Jack Spurr
—	DF		Matthew Dopson
—	MF		Alfie Coulthard
—	MF		Luke Heppell
—	MF		Max Emmerson

No.	Pos.	Nation	Player
—	MF		Dean Armstrong
—	MF		Jack Maughan
—	MF		Harry Norris
—	MF		Charlie Smith
—	MF		Kuba Zmich
—	MF		Ritchie Slaughter
—	FW		Dan Lanning
—	FW		Leon Burke
—	FW		Liam Clavering
—	FW		Jack Wilson
—	FW		Jakub Zych
—	FW		Sean Reid

== Management ==
=== Current backroom staff ===
==== First Team ====
As of 24 October 2025

Name	Role
Vacant	Manager
(England) Gareth McAlindon	Assistant manager
(England) Steve Bowey	Assistant manager
(England) Tom Kitchen	Physiotherapist

== Board of Directors ==
As of 31 January 2025

Name	Role
(England) Stephen Best	Chairman
(England) Darren Arkley	Director
(England) Tony Quinn	Director
(England) John Graham	Club Secretary
(England) Jonny Taberham	Treasurer
(England) Gareth Edwards	Welfare Officer

== Records ==
- Best FA Cup performance: First Round proper (1984–85)
- Best FA Trophy performance: Quarter-finals (1988–89)
- Best FA Vase performance: Champions (1977–78)

== Honours ==
- FA Vase
  - Winners: 1977–78
- Northern Premier League Division One North
  - Playoff winners: 2008–09
- Northern League Division One
  - Champions: 2005–06
  - Runners-up: 1987–88
- Northern League Division Two
  - Champions: 1985–86
  - Runners-up: 1999–2000
  - Promoted: 2004–05
- Northern League Cup
  - Winners: 1985–86, 2005–06
  - Runners-up: 1990–91
- Wearside League
  - Winners: 1973–74, 1975–76, 1982–83, 1983–84, 1984–85
  - Runner-up: 1974–75, 1977–78, 1979–80
