= 2018 FA Vase final =

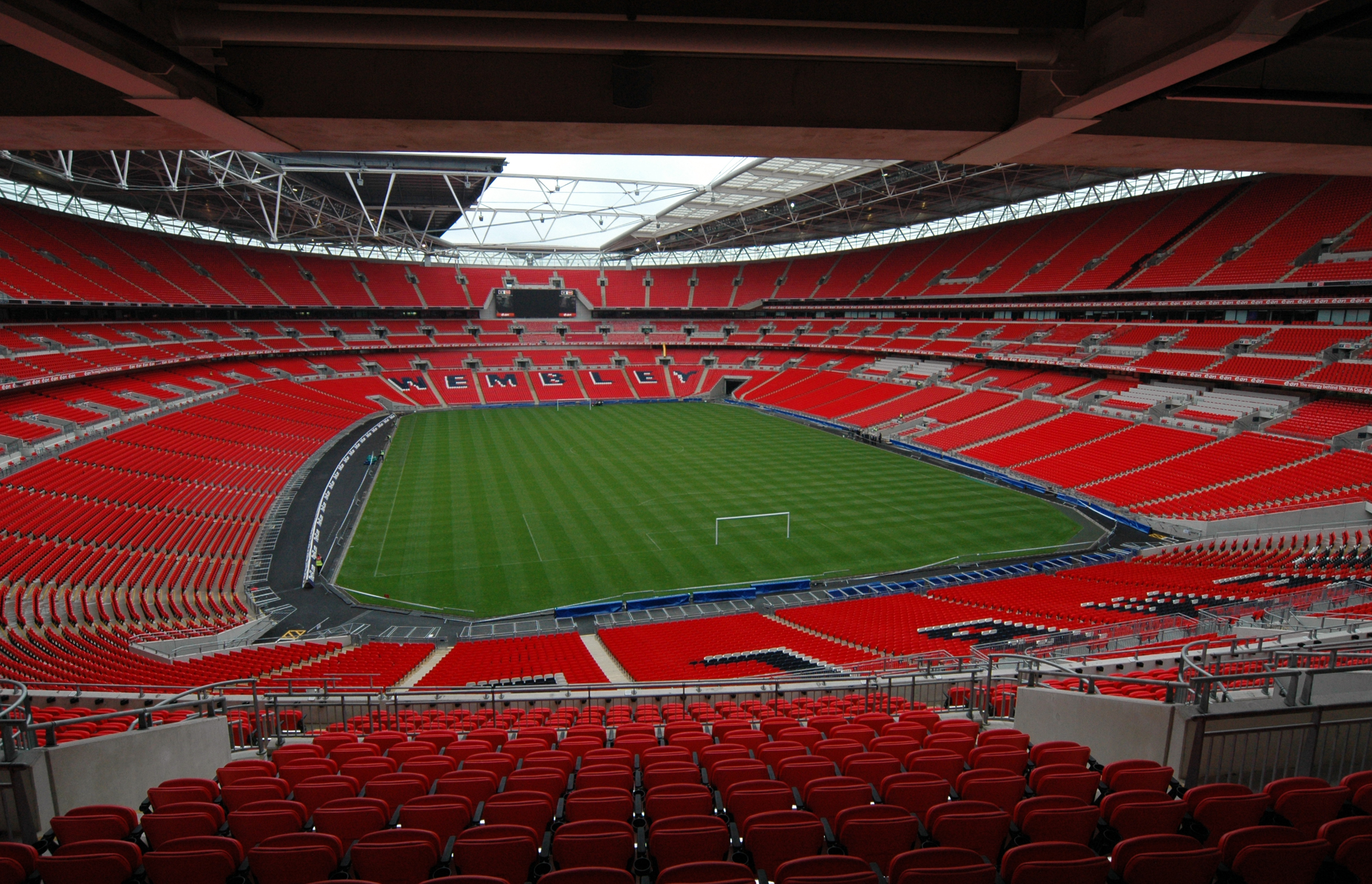
- Wembley Stadium hosted the final
- Event: 2017–18 FA Vase
Stockton Town	Thatcham Town
0	1
- Date: 20 May 2018
- Venue: Wembley Stadium, Wembley, London
- Man of the Match: Baboucarr Jarra
- Referee: John Brooks
- Attendance: 31,430
- Weather: Sunny

The 2018 FA Vase final was the 44th final of the Football Association's cup competition for teams at levels 9–11 of the English football league system. The match was contested between Stockton Town, of the Northern League Division One, and Thatcham Town, of the Hellenic League Premier Division. This was the first time both teams had reached the final and the first visit to Wembley Stadium for both sides. The final of the FA Trophy was played on the same day at the same venue for the third year running, as part of the FA's Non-League Finals Day. Both matches were televised in the UK on BT Sport.

Stockton Town began their campaign in the second qualifying round, with a victory over Consett. They proceeded to defeat Whickham, Bootle, City of Liverpool, West Auckland Town, Stourport Swifts, Windsor and Marske United en route to the final.

Thatcham Town started in the first round of the competition, where they defeated Horsham YMCA. Victories over Broadbridge Heath, Sevenoaks Town, Biggleswade, Bromsgrove Sporting, Melksham Town and 1874 Northwich saw them reach the final.

== Background ==
The final will be the first appearance for both sides in a national cup final.

Stockton Town play their league football in the Northern League Division One, following promotion from the second division in the previous season. The 2017–18 season was their first season at level nine of the pyramid and only their third season playing in the FA Vase since their first appearance in the 1982–83 season. Their best run in the competition was reaching the second round in the 2016–17 season.

Thatcham Town play in the Hellenic League Premier Division. Thatcham won the league prior to the final on goal difference, finishing on 98 points, to earn promotion to the Southern Football League. They won thirty-one of their thirty-eight league matches, drawing five and losing just two. They embarked on a forty match unbeaten run, in all competitions, before the final - ending with a 2–1 defeat against Binfield two games before to the final. Their previous best run in the competition was a quarter-final appearance in the 1988–89 season, where they were defeated by Berkshire rivals Hungerford Town.

=== Route to the final ===
==== Stockton Town ====
23 November 2017 Second round qualifying	Stockton Town	4–3 (a.e.t.)	Consett	Stockton-On-Tees
15:00				Stadium: Bishopton Road West; Attendance: 212

21 October 2017 First round	Whickham	0–2	Stockton Town	Whickham
15:00				Stadium: The Glebe Sports Ground; Attendance: 84

11 November 2017 Second round	Stockton Town	4–2 (a.e.t.)	Bootle	Stockton-On-Tees
15:00				Stadium: Bishopton Road West; Attendance: 360

2 December 2017 Third round	Stockton Town	1–0	City of Liverpool	Stockton-On-Tees
15:00				Stadium: Bishopton Road West; Attendance: 527

6 January 2018 Fourth round	Stockton Town	2–1 (a.e.t.)	West Auckland Town	Stockton-On-Tees
15:00				Stadium: Bishopton Road West; Attendance: 537

3 February 2018 Fifth round	Stockton Town	3-0	Stourport Swifts	Stockton-On-Tees
15:00				Stadium: Bishopton Road West; Attendance: 663

24 February 2018 Quarter-final	Stockton Town	2–0	Windsor	Stockton-On-Tees
15:00				Stadium: Bishopton Road West; Attendance: 1,213

17 March 2018 Semi-final First Leg	Marske United	0–2	Stockton Town	Stockton-On-Tees
15:00			Rowbotham 12' (o.g.); Woodhouse 44'	Stadium: Bishopton Road West; Attendance: 1,502
Note: Match played at Bishopton Road West, Stockton due to Marske United's ground being waterlogged.

24 March 2018 Semi-final Second Leg	Stockton Town	1–2 (3–2 agg.)	Marske United	Stockton-On-Tees
15:00	Mulligan 41' (pen.)		O’Sullivan 8'; Fairley 56'	Stadium: Bishopton Road West; Attendance: 1,800
Note: Stockton Town won 3–2 on aggregate

==== Thatcham Town ====
21 October 2017 First round	Thatcham Town	2–1	Horsham YMCA	Thatcham
15:00	White 71'; Johnson 81'	Report	Schaaf 17'	Stadium: Waterside Park; Attendance: 96

11 November 2017 Second round	Thatcham Town	8–2	Broadbridge Heath	Thatcham
15:00	Cooper-Clark 4', 58', 70'; Grant 10'; Helmore 60', 65'; Miller 78'; Browne 87'	Report	Campbell 61'; Frankland 90'	Stadium: Waterside Park; Attendance: 120

2 December 2017 Third round	Thatcham Town	3–1	Sevenoaks Town	Thatcham
15:00	Cooper-Clark 33', 37'; Elliott 65'	Report	Carnegie 59'	Stadium: Waterside Park; Attendance: 145

6 January 2018 Fourth round	Thatcham Town	2–1	Biggleswade	Thatcham
15:00	Grant 24'; Jarra 78'	Report	George 30' (pen.)	Stadium: Waterside Park; Attendance: 216

3 February 2018 Fifth round	Thatcham Town	2–1	Bromsgrove Sporting	Thatcham
15:00	Elliott 18', 27'	Report	Gregory 35' (pen.)	Stadium: Waterside Park; Attendance: 701

24 February 2018 Quarter-final	Melksham Town	0–1	Thatcham Town	Melksham
15:00		Report	Elliott 89'	Stadium: Oakfield Stadium; Attendance: 2,208

17 March 2018 Semi-final First Leg	Thatcham Town	1–0	1874 Northwich	Thatcham
15:00	Cook 4' (pen.)	Report		Stadium: Waterside Park; Attendance: 1,134

24 March 2018 Semi-final Second Leg	1874 Northwich	2–3 (2–4 agg.)	Thatcham Town	Winsford
15:00	McGowan 44' (pen.); Woolley 69'	Report	James 3', 22'; Cooper-Clark 47'	Stadium: Barton Stadium; Attendance: 1,693

== Match ==
=== Details ===
20 May 2018
12:15 BST

Stockton Town	0–1	Thatcham Town
	Report	Cooper-Clark 24' (pen.)

Wembley Stadium, London
Attendance: 31,430
Referee: John Brooks

1	(England) Michael Arthur
2	(England) Joe Carter (substituted off) 61'
3	(England) James Ward (substituted off) 79'
4	(England) Nathan Mulligan
5	(England) Dale Mulligan
6	(England) Tom Coulthard (C)
7	(England) Kevin Hayes
9	(England) Fred Woodhouse
10	(England) Jamie Owens
11	(England) James Risborough
15	(England) Chris Stockton (substituted off) 66'
Substitutes:
12	(England) Adam Nicholson (substituted on) 79'
14	(England) Sonni Coleman (substituted on) 66'
16	(England) Matthew Garbutt (substituted on) 61'
17	(England) Alan Cossavella
18	(England) Chris Dunwell
Manager:
(England) Michael Dunwell

1	(England) Chris Rackley
2	(England) Lewis Brownhill
3	(England) Curtis Angell
4	(England) Tom Melledew (substituted off) 83'
5	(England) Baboucarr Jarra
6	(England) Tom Moran
8	(England) Harrison Bayley
9	(England) Shane Cooper-Clark (substituted off) 78'
10	(Saint Vincent and the Grenadines) Gavin James
11	(England) Ekow Elliott
20	(England) Jordan Brown (substituted off) 70'
Substitutes:
14	(England) Harry Grant
15	(England) Gareth Thomas
16	(England) Ross Cook (substituted on) 78'
17	(England) Ashleigh James (substituted on) 83'
18	(England) Jemel Johnson (substituted on) 70'
Manager:
(England) Danny Robinson

Man of the match: Baboucarr Jarra

Match officials

- Assistant referees: Adrian Waters & Craig Taylor
- Fourth official: Antony Coggins

Match rules

- 90 minutes.
- 30 minutes of extra-time if necessary.
- Penalty shoot-out if scores still level.
- Five named substitutes.
- Maximum of three substitutions.
