= Dunwell =

Dunwell is a surname. Notable people with the surname include:

- Brad Dunwell, American soccer player
- Charles T. Dunwell (1852–1908), American politician
- Mary Ann Dunwell, American politician
- Michael Dunwell, English soccer player and manager
- Pauline Dunwell Partridge (1879–1944), American writer
- Richard Dunwell, English soccer player
- Steve Dunwell, American photographer
- Joseph Dunwell and David Dunwell, of English rock band The Dunwells
