= 2019–20 Northern Football League =

Northern Football League
- Season: 2019–20

The 2019–20 season was the 122nd in the history of Northern Football League, a football competition in England. The allocations for Steps 1 to 6 for season 2019–20 were announced by the FA on 19 May. These were subject to appeal, and the Northern League's constitution was ratified at the league's annual general meeting (AGM) on 15 June.

As a result of the COVID-19 pandemic, this season's competition was formally abandoned on 26 March 2020, with all results from the season being expunged, and no promotion or relegation taking place to, from, or within the competition. On 30 March 2020, sixty-six non-league clubs sent an open letter to the Football Association requesting that they reconsider their decision. A legal appeal against the decision, funded by South Shields of the Northern Premier League, was dismissed later in June.

== Division One ==
Northern Football League Division One
- Season: 2019–20
- Matches: 292
- Goals: 1,029 (3.52 per match)

Division One featured 17 clubs which competed in the division last season, along with three new clubs, promoted from Division Two:

- Billingham Town
- Northallerton Town
- Thornaby

=== Division One table ===
Pos	Team	Pld	W	D	L	GF	GA	GD	Pts
1	Stockton Town	30	24	5	1	71	14	+57	77
2	Shildon	30	20	4	6	75	38	+37	64
3	Hebburn Town	31	19	5	7	82	48	+34	62
4	North Shields	28	16	6	6	56	37	+19	54
5	Newton Aycliffe	29	17	2	10	64	43	+21	53
6	Consett	27	14	7	6	72	38	+34	49
7	Guisborough Town	29	15	4	10	43	38	+5	49
8	Newcastle Benfield	31	11	10	10	50	49	+1	43
9	West Auckland Town	29	11	9	9	50	35	+15	42
10	Billingham Town	30	12	6	12	54	54	0	42
11	Bishop Auckland	32	12	5	15	59	66	−7	41
12	Sunderland RCA	30	12	5	13	50	59	−9	41
13	Ryhope Colliery Welfare	30	9	9	12	45	64	−19	36
14	Seaham Red Star	28	7	8	13	43	67	−24	29
15	Ashington	29	8	5	16	33	61	−28	29
16	Whitley Bay	31	7	7	17	50	62	−12	28
17	Whickham	29	7	4	18	37	66	−29	25
18	Thornaby	29	5	7	17	34	67	−33	22
19	Penrith	29	5	5	19	32	69	−37	20
20	Northallerton Town	27	6	1	20	29	54	−25	19

Source: NL website
Rules for classification: 1) Points; 2) Goal difference; 3) Number of goals scored; 4) Number of matches won; 5) Head-to-head results

=== Stadia and locations ===
Location of Division One clubs

Club	Stadium	Capacity
Ashington	Woodhorn Lane	
Billingham Town	Bedford Terrace	3,000
Bishop Auckland	Heritage Park	1,950
Consett	Belle View Stadium	
Guisborough Town	King George V Ground	
Hebburn Town	Hebburn Sports & Social Ground	
Newcastle Benfield	Sam Smith’s Park	2,000
Newton Aycliffe	Moore Lane Park	
Northallerton Town	Calvert Stadium	
North Shields	Ralph Gardner Park	1,500
Penrith	Frenchfield Stadium	1,500
Ryhope Colliery Welfare	Ryhope Recreation Ground	
Seaham Red Star	Seaham Town Park	
Shildon	Dean Street	2,000
Stockton Town	Bishopton Road West	1,800
Sunderland RCA	Meadow Park	1,500
Thornaby	Teesdale Park	5,000
West Auckland Town	Darlington Road	2,000
Whickham	Glebe Sports Ground	4,000
Whitley Bay	Hillheads Park	4,500

== Division Two ==
Northern Football League Division Two
- Season: 2019–20
- Matches: 280
- Goals: 1,045 (3.73 per match)

Division Two featured 17 clubs which competed in the division last season, along with three new clubs:

- Carlisle City, transferred from North West Counties League
- Newcastle University, promoted from the Northern Football Alliance
- Sunderland West End, promoted from the Wearside League

=== Division Two table ===
Pos	Team	Pld	W	D	L	GF	GA	GD	Pts
1	West Allotment Celtic	28	22	2	4	100	39	+61	68
2	Redcar Athletic	30	20	5	5	63	33	+30	65
3	Crook Town	29	19	3	7	73	34	+39	60
4	Billingham Synthonia	30	18	2	10	64	42	+22	56
5	Heaton Stannington	28	16	5	7	63	29	+34	53
6	Ryton & Crawcrook Albion	30	16	4	10	60	39	+21	52
7	Carlisle City	27	16	3	8	65	54	+11	51
8	Tow Law Town	27	14	4	9	55	38	+17	46
9	Jarrow	27	14	3	10	48	39	+9	45
10	Easington Colliery	27	10	6	11	64	55	+9	36
11	Birtley Town	27	11	3	13	36	38	−2	36
12	Willington	27	11	3	13	44	51	−7	36
13	Newcastle University	27	10	5	12	60	63	−3	35
14	Chester-le-Street Town	29	11	1	17	40	60	−20	34
15	Bedlington Terriers	26	10	1	15	44	65	−21	31
16	Esh Winning	29	8	6	15	49	63	−14	30
17	Sunderland West End	29	7	6	16	38	62	−24	27
18	Washington	30	5	4	21	33	77	−44	19
19	Brandon United	27	3	6	18	27	78	−51	15
20	Durham City	26	2	2	22	19	86	−67	8

Source: NL website
Rules for classification: 1) Points; 2) Goal difference; 3) Number of goals scored; 4) Number of matches won; 5) Head-to-head results

=== Stadia and locations ===
Location of Division Two clubs

Club	Stadium	Capacity
Bedlington Terriers	Welfare Park	3,000
Billingham Synthonia	Norton Sports Complex	1,970
Birtley Town	Birtley Sports Complex	
Brandon United	Welfare Ground	
Carlisle City	Gillford Park	
Chester-le-Street Town	Moor Park	
Crook Town	The Sir Tom Cowie Millfield Ground	1,500
Easington Colliery	Welfare Park	
Esh Winning	West Terrace	3,500
Heaton Stannington	Grounsell Park	
Jarrow	Perth Green	
Newcastle University	Kimberley Park	
Redcar Athletic	Green Lane	
Ryton & Crawcrook Albion	Kingsley Park	1,500
Sunderland West End	Nissan Sports Complex	1,000
Washington	New Ferens Park	
Tow Law Town	Ironworks Road	3,000
West Allotment Celtic	Druid Park	
Willington	Hall Lane	
Durham City	Hall Lane	
