= John Brooks (referee) =

English football referee (born 1990)

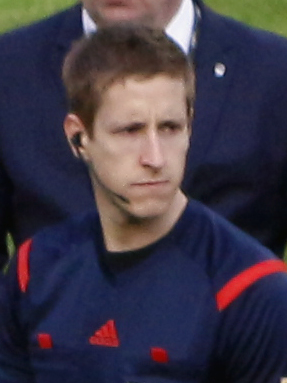
- Brooks in March 2015
- Full name: John Edmund Cornwall Brooks
- Born: 1990 (age 35–36); Melton Mowbray, Leicestershire, England
- Other occupation: Insurance Broker

Domestic
Years	League	Role
2012–2016	Premier League	Assistant referee
2014–2016	Football Conference	Referee
2016–	English Football League	Referee
2021–	Premier League	Referee

International
Years	League	Role
2015–2016	FIFA listed	Assistant referee
2023–	FIFA listed	Referee

John Edmund Cornwall Brooks (born 1990) is an English professional football referee who works primarily in the Premier League, having been promoted to the Select Group in 2021. He has been a UEFA First Category referee since 2024, and was previously an assistant referee in the Premier League from 2012 to 2016.

Brooks began refereeing in 2004, and became a Select Group assistant referee in 2012 and then a FIFA listed international assistant referee in 2015. He began refereeing in the Football Conference League in 2014, before becoming an EFL referee in 2016. He was promoted to Select Group 2 in 2018, before his promotion to Select Group 1 in June 2021. He was promoted to the FIFA list of international referees in 2023.

In November 2026, Brooks was heavily criticised for his handling of Tottenham Hotspur's 1–0 defeat to Leeds United, after he did not send off Jayden Bogle for stamping on Mathys Tel’s achilles. Tel was forced off injured, and former referee Mike Dean and former assistant referee Darren Cann both said the challenge deserved a red card. Steven Gerrard described Brooks’s performance as the worst he had seen from a referee in the Premier League. Tottenham Hotspur subsequently announced they would submit a formal complaint to the refereeing body Pro Ref over the decision.

== Early life and education ==
John Edmund Cornwall Brooks was born in 1990 in Melton Mowbray, to Edmund Hugh Cornwall Brooks (1949–1990) and Sally Ann Taylor. His father died in a car accident in 1990. Through his father, he is a descendant of King Edward III of England, and also of Richard of Cornwall, the son of King John of England.

Brooks attended Loughborough Grammar school.

== Career ==
=== Early career (2004–2021) ===
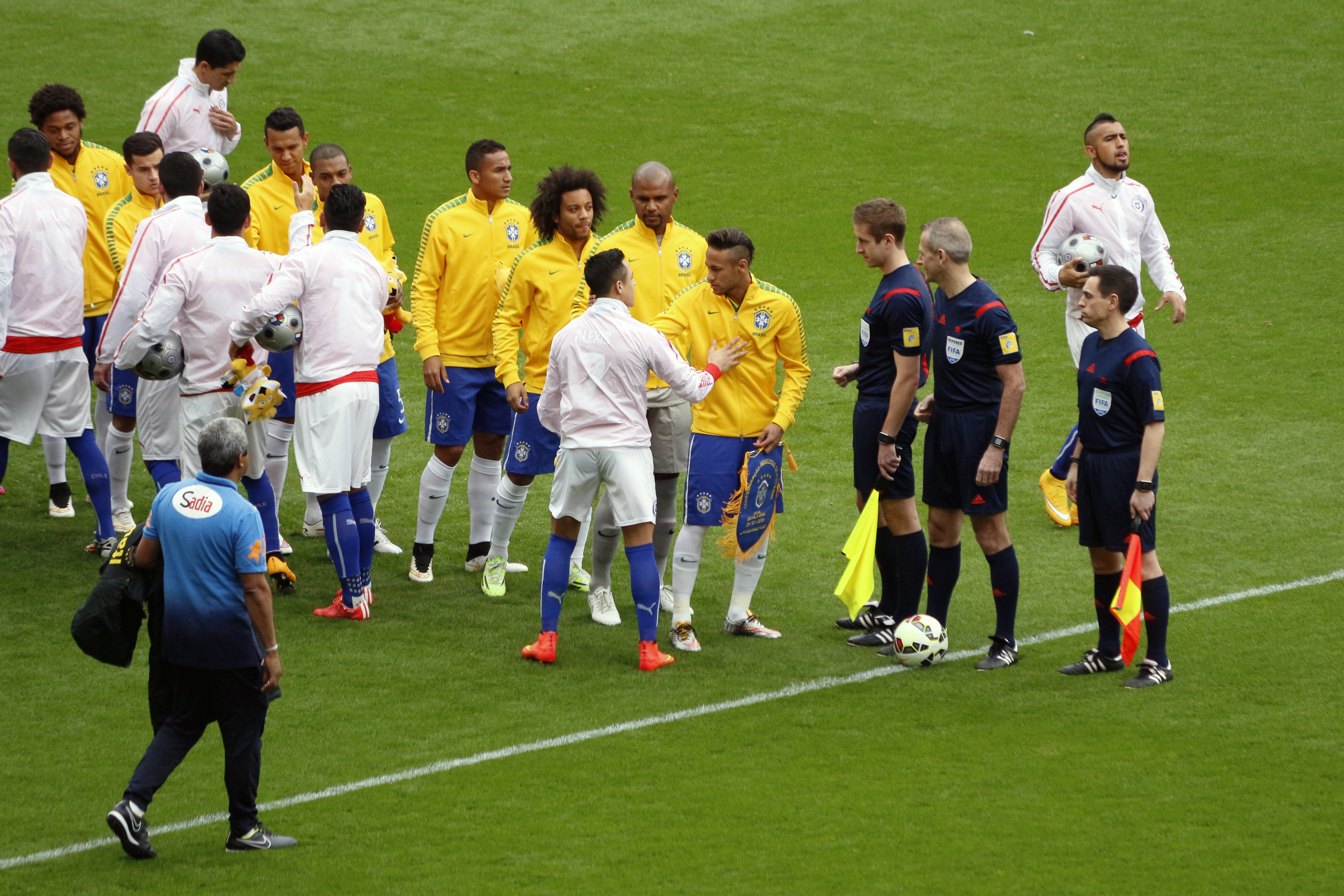
Brooks (standing third from right) next to Neymar (left) and Martin Atkinson (right) on 29 March 2015 officiating Brazil vs Chile.

Brooks played football up until the age of 14, and has said that he "wasn't the most talented footballer", but loved football and so decided to take up refereeing. He began refereeing in the local leagues in Leicestershire in 2004 at the age of 14. He began refereeing adult football at the age of 16. He also worked at an insurance brokers before becoming a professional referee.

Brooks began officiating as an assistant referee at Premier League level at the age of 21. In 2011, he was promoted to the national list of assistant referees, and in 2012 he was promoted to the Select Group of assistant referees. He was promoted to the FIFA list of international assistant referees in 2015.

Brooks was an assistant referee at the 2014 Football League Championship play-off final and the 2015 FA Community Shield. He was also an assistant referee to Mark Clattenburg at the 2016 FA Cup final.

Brooks began refereeing in the Conference League at the start of the 2014–2015 season, before moving up to Football League in the 2016–2017 season. He was promoted to Select Group 2 at the start of the 2018–2019 season. He refereed the 2018 FA Vase final between Stockton Town and Thatcham Town.

=== Premier League and FIFA list (2021–present) ===
==== 2021–22: Debut Premier League season ====
Brooks was promoted to the Select Group of referees in June 2021. His referee coach is Andre Marriner.

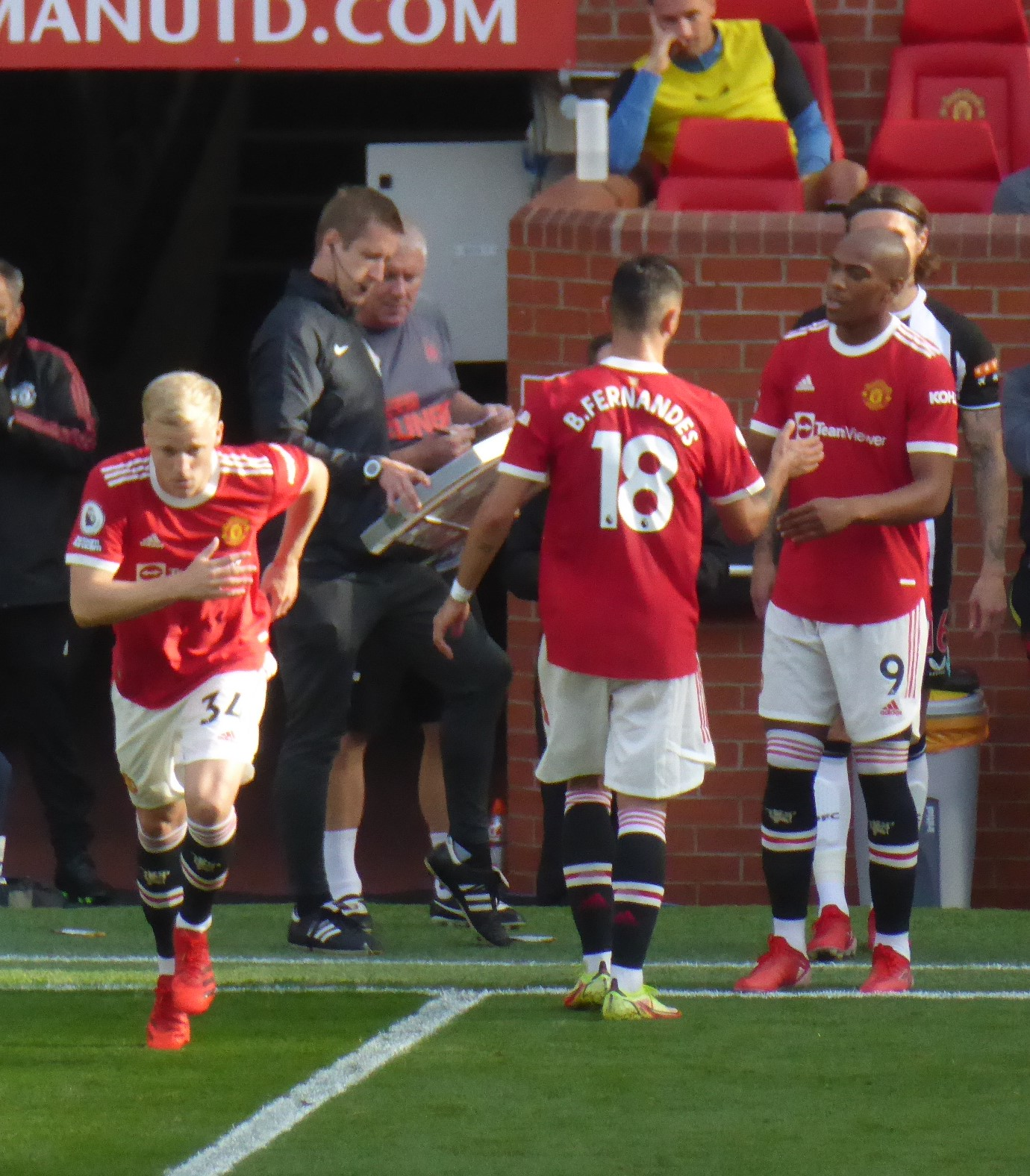
Brooks (second from left), as the fourth official, with Donny Van de Beek, Bruno Fernandes and Anthony Martial on 11 September 2021.

In December 2021, Brooks refereed his first Premier League match between Wolves and Burnley at Molineux. He refereed a total of 4 Premier League games during the 2021–2022 season; on 2 January 2022 between Everton and Brighton at Goodison Park, on 26 February 2022 between Brighton and Aston Villa at the AMEX stadium, and on 30 April 2022 between Aston Villa and Norwich at Villa Park, the last of which was the game that saw Norwich relegated from the Premier League.

Brooks also refereed 11 games in the EFL Championship, as well as a third round FA Cup tie between Tottenham and Morecambe at Tottenham Hotspur Stadium on 9 January 2022.

==== 2022–23: Premier League breakthrough ====
Brooks refereed his first Premier League game of the 2022–23 season on 13 August 2022 between Wolverhampton Wanderers and Fulham at the Molineux stadium.

Brooks was promoted to the FIFA list of international referees at the start of 2023.

On 11 February 2023, Brooks, as the video assistant referee, wrongly ruled out a goal by Brighton & Hove Albion's Pervis Estupiñán against Crystal Palace. A technician tasked with drawing the lines failed to draw the line to the deepest Crystal Palace defender and mistakenly identified James Tomkins as the Crystal Palace player closest to his own goal when it was actually his team-mate Marc Guéhi. After the image was presented to Brooks, he misjudged the situation and unintentionally ruled out Brighton & Hove's goal. An emergency meeting was convened by PGMOL head Howard Webb after the incident. Following the meeting, Brooks was subsequently dropped for his next two matches.

After almost a two month gap, Brooks returned to refereeing on 5 March 2023, where he refereed Nottingham Forest's 2–2 draw with Everton at the City Ground. He was criticised by Nottingham Forest manager Steve Cooper and Everton manager Sean Dyche for his performance in the match. Cooper said that there would be a lot of talk about the performance of Brooks, and said that he had "too much impact" on the game. Cooper claimed that there was a foul on Morgan Gibbs-White in the build up to Abdoulaye Doucouré's goal, whilst Dyche said that he was "amazed" that Everton did not get a penalty after Séamus Coleman went down after a challenge from Jack Colback. Cooper subsequently called for a review into Brooks' display and Nottingham Forest made a formal complaint about the standard of referees. Despite this, Brooks went on to referee Bournemouth vs Liverpool at the Vitality stadium, and later refereed Manchester United vs Brentford at Old Trafford on 5 April 2023.

Brooks was the fourth official for Liverpool's 4–3 victory over Tottenham Hotspur at Anfield on 30 April 2023, in which a winner for Liverpool was scored in the 94th minute. Liverpool manager Jürgen Klopp celebrated the stoppage time winner by running up to Brooks and celebrating in front of him, which Klopp later described as being "not cool" and admitted was his fault. Referee Paul Tierney deemed his conduct worthy of a red card, but Brooks convinced Tierney to instead issue him with a yellow card. Klopp later submitted a letter to the FA, in which he apologised to both Tierney and Brooks, and stated that he was sorry for his "immediate reaction" when he ran towards Brooks.

Brooks refereed 5 matches during the final month of the season in May 2023. He refereed Manchester City's 3–0 win over West Ham at the Etihad on 3 May and Bournemouth's 1–3 defeat to Chelsea at the Vitality stadium on 6 May, before refereeing Manchester United vs Wolverhampton Wanderers at Old Trafford on 13 May and then Liverpool vs Aston Villa at Anfield on 20 May. His last game came on the final day of the season between Brentford and Premier League champions Manchester City at the Gtech Community stadium on 28 May 2023. He refereed a total of 19 Premier League games during the season.

==== 2023–24: Rise and international career ====
Brooks was the fourth official for the 2023 FA Community Shield between Arsenal and Manchester City on 6 August 2023. His first refereed Premier League game of the season came on 12 August 2023 between Sheffield United and Crystal Palace at Bramall Lane. He refereed his first UEFA Europa League match between Sheriff Tiraspol and Servette on 26 October 2023.

Brooks refereed Newcastle vs Liverpool at St James' Park on 27 August 2023. In the match, he showed a straight red card to Liverpool captain Virgil Van Dijk for a DOGSO on Newcastle forward Alexander Isak. Van Dijk argued with Brooks over the decision to send him off while the incident was being reviewed by the VAR, and said "absolute fucking joke" during the incident. Van Dijk later denied calling Brooks that, and said he was "adamant" that he was instead referring to the decision by Brooks and subsequent VAR decision to send him off. After looking at the match report by Brooks, the FA subsequently charged Van Dijk for acting in an improper manner towards a match official after his sending off, and also for using abusive and or insulting words. After the match, Newcastle manager Eddie Howe said that Brooks was "wrong" to not issue a second yellow card to Liverpool defender Trent Alexander-Arnold for a foul on Newcastle forward Anthony Gordon.

Brooks was the VAR for Chelsea's 4–1 win over Tottenham at Tottenham Hotspur stadium on 6 November 2023. During the match, Brooks made 9 VAR decisions, and in the match there were 5 goals ruled out and 2 red cards issued. During the first half, Brooks checked for a red card against Tottenham defender Cristian Romero at 22 mins but no card was issued. At 24 mins, he disallowed an equalised for Chelsea forward Raheem Sterling for handball and at 28 mins he disallowed a goal from Moisés Caicedo for offside. At 31 mins, he recommended referee Michael Oliver to review Romero for serious foul play for a foul by Romero on Enzo Fernández, for which Oliver issued a penalty and a red card against Romero. Brooks was praised for his performance as the VAR by former referees Dermot Gallagher and Mark Clattenburg. PGMOL chief Howard Webb also said that the VAR officials for the match and the officials on the field did really well, and described the review for the Romero sending off and subsequent penalty as an "excellent process" and a "good intervention".

On 26 November 2023, Brooks was the referee for Manchester United's 3–0 win over Everton at Goodison Park, in which Alejandro Garnacho scored the opening goal; which was a bicycle kick which later won the Puskás award. During the second half after the first goal had been scored, Brooks initially booked Anthony Martial for a dive, but VAR Chris Kavanagh advised Brooks to watch Ashley Young's challenge on the pitchside monitor and after doing that, Brooks awarded a penalty to Manchester United which Marcus Rashford scored to make it 2–0. Everton manager Sean Dyche described the "screen thing" as a "farce", and said that VAR seems to be "mayhem all the time". Thousands of Everton fans also took part in anti-Premier League protests in the match by holding up cards with the Premier League logo with the word "corrupt" underneath it, and Brooks was booed by the Everton fans for decisions he made during the match.

Brooks refereed Portugal's 9–0 win over Luxemburg on 11 September 2023. He later refereed France's 14–0 victory over Gibraltar at the Allianz Riviera on 18 November 2023, which was the largest win in the history of the European Championship qualifiers. During the match, Brooks issued a red card to Gibraltar defender Ethan Santos after a VAR review, and also awarded a penalty to France after a VAR review for handball, which Kylian Mbappé converted. He refereed the UEFA Youth League final between Olympiacos and Milan at Colovray Stadium, Nyon in Switzerland on 22 April 2024. Brooks refereed two FA cup games during the season, firstly during the third round on 7 January 2024 between Arsenal and Liverpool at the Emirates stadium. He also refereed the quarter-final between Manchester United and Liverpool at Old Trafford on 17 March 2024, during which he issued a second yellow card to Manchester United player Amad Diallo for excessive celebration after he scored a 121st minute winner in extra time to make the score 4–3. He also refereed a Carabao cup second leg semi-final between Chelsea and Middlesbrough at Stamford Bridge on 23 January 2024.

Brooks refereed a total of 22 Premier games during the season, with his last refereed Premier League match coming on the final day of the season on 19 May 2024, between Manchester City and West Ham at the Etihad stadium, which Manchester City won 3–1 to become Premier League champions. Brooks was reported as being statistically the best Premier League referee during the season, as well as the second best VAR.

Brooks refereed the 2024 EFL Championship play-off final between Southampton and Leeds at Wembley on 26 May 2024, which was attended by 85,862 people; making it the highest attended EFL Championship play-off final in over a decade.

==== 2024–25: UEFA promotion and Cup final ====
Brooks was promoted to the UEFA first category of referees at the start of the 2024–2025 season; he replaced Craig Pawson, and joined Chris Kavanagh to be the only English officials on the UEFA second tier referees list for the season. He was appointed to referee the 2024 FA Community Shield, but sustained a minor injury the week before the final was due to be played, and he was replaced by Jarred Gillett. He refereed his first Premier League match of the season between Tottenham and Brentford at the Tottenham Hotspur stadium on 21 September 2024. Brooks was defended by Brentford manager Thomas Frank when Frank was asked about the handball by Tottenham goalkeeper Guglielmo Vicario that Brooks had missed during the game; Frank stated that it was a "mistake" but said that the incident "did not define the game", and also added that "Brooks overall had a very good game" and said that "the way he handled soft fouls both ways was really good".

Brooks refereed his second Premier League match of the season on 20 October 2024, which was a big six clash between Liverpool and Chelsea at Anfield. During the first half, Brooks awarded a penalty to Liverpool for a foul by Levi Colwill on Curtis Jones, which Mohamed Salah then scored. Brooks awarded a second penalty to Liverpool for Robert Sánchez's challenge on Jones, but changed his decision after being recommended to review at the pitchside monitor by VAR Michael Oliver. After the match, Liverpool manager Arne Slot accused Brooks of wanting to show that he was not able to give the decisions he had to make whilst referring to the Anfield atmosphere. Conversely, Chelsea manager Enzo Maresca said the referee was there to "make decisions", and claimed that sometimes they were made "because of the noise", but also stated that "overall they did ok". Brooks has also refereed multiple other big six clashes during the season, including Manchester City's 4–0 defeat to Tottenham at the Etihad stadium on 23 November 2024, and a carabao cup quarter-final which Manchester United lost 4–3 to Tottenham at the Tottenham Hotspur stadium on 19 December 2024. He refereed Manchester City's 3–1 win over Chelsea at the Etihad on 25 January 2025.

Internationally, in the UEFA Europa League, Brooks refereed Ajax's 4–0 win over Besiktas at the Johan Cruyff Arena on 26 September 2024, and Malmö FF's 2–2 draw with Galatasaray at the Eleda stadion on 12 December 2024. He also refereed the group stage UEFA Nations league match between Malta and Moldova on 13 October 2024. On 30 January 2025, Brooks refereed Braga vs Lazio at the Estádio Municipal de Braga.

Brooks refereed Ipswich Town's 2–0 win over Chelsea at Portman Road on 30 December 2024. In the 10th minute of the match, he awarded a penalty to Ipswich for a foul by Filip Jörgensen on Liam Delap. Numerous Chelsea players then surrounded Brooks due to the on-field decision, including Levi Colwill and Enzo Fernández, who were both then booked for dissent. Chelsea were later charged by the FA for "surrounding a match official", and for failing to "ensure their players did not behave in a way which was improper".

Brooks refereed the first leg of a Carabao cup semi-final between Arsenal and Newcastle at the Emirates on 7 January 2025. On 4 March, Brooks was appointed to referee the 2025 Carabao Cup final.

2026–27: Sixth Premier League season

In November 2026, Brooks was heavily criticised for his handling of Tottenham Hotspur's 1–0 defeat to Leeds United, after he did not send off Jayden Bogle for stamping on Mathys Tel’s achilles. Tel was forced off injured, and former referee Mike Dean and former assistant referee Darren Cann both said the challenge deserved a red card. Steven Gerrard described Brooks’s performance as the worst he had seen from a referee in the Premier League. Tottenham Hotspur subsequently announced they would submit a formal complaint to the refereeing body Pro Ref over the decision.

== Career statistics ==
Season	Competition(s)	Games (Note: Total number of games for all competitions listed)	Total (yellow card)	(yellow card) per game	Total (red card)	(red card) per game
2012–13	Premier League U21 D1	1	2	2	0	0
2013–14	Premier League U21 D1	3	7	2.3	0	0
2014–15	Conference League	15	70	4.7	3	0.2
2015–16	National League	17	41	2.4	0	0
2016–17	League Two, League One	27	124	4.6	8	0.3
2017–18	EFL Championship, FA Cup, EFL Cup	9	30	3.3	1	0.1
2018–19	EFL Championship, FA Cup, EFL Cup	28	116	4.1	3	0.1
2019–20	EFL Championship, FA Cup, EFL Cup	32	116	3.6	1	0
2020–21	EFL Championship, EFL Championship play-offs, FA Cup, EFL Cup, League Two	30	103	3.4	5	0.2
2021–22	Premier League, EFL Championship, EFL Cup, League Two, European Qualifiers	18	58	3.2	2	0.1
2022–23	Premier League, EFL Championship, FA Cup, EFL Cup, U21 European Qualifiers	28	113	4	3	0.1
2023–24	Premier League, EFL Championship, EFL Championship play-offs, FA Cup, EFL Cup, UEFA Europa League, UEFA Youth League, UEFA Europa Conference League Qualifiers	33	148	4.5	5	0.2

== List of officiated domestic finals ==
2014 Football League Championship play-off final
Date	Match	Venue	Role
24 May 2014	Derby County – Queens Park Rangers	Wembley Stadium	Assistant referee
2015 FA Community Shield
Date	Match	Venue	Role
2 August 2015	Arsenal – Chelsea	Wembley Stadium	Assistant referee
2016 FA Cup final
Date	Match	Venue	Role
21 May 2016	Crystal Palace – Manchester United	Wembley Stadium	Assistant referee
2018 FA Vase final
Date	Match	Venue	Role
20 May 2018	Stockton Town – Thatcham Town	Wembley Stadium	Referee
2023 FA Community Shield
Date	Match	Venue	Role
6 August 2023	Arsenal – Manchester City	Wembley Stadium	Fourth official
2024 EFL Championship play-off final
Date	Match	Venue	Role
26 May 2024	Leeds United – Southampton	Wembley Stadium	Referee
2025 EFL Cup final
Date	Match	Venue	Role
16 March 2025	Liverpool – Newcastle United	Wembley Stadium	Referee

== See also ==
- List of football referees
