= Stockton Town F.C. =

English football club

Coordinates: 54°34′14″N 1°20′23″W

Stockton Town
- Full name: Stockton Town Football Club
- Nickname: The Anchors
- Short name: Town; STFC; Stockton
- Founded: 1987; 39 years ago
- Ground: Bishopton Road West
- Capacity: 2,200 (600 seated)
- Chairman: Martin Hillerby
- Manager: Michael Dunwell
- League: Northern Premier League Premier Division
- 2025–26: Northern Premier League Premier Division, 5th of 21
- Website: Official website
Home colours	Away colours

Stockton Town Football Club is an association football club based in Stockton-on-Tees, England. They are currently members of the Northern Premier League Premier Division and play at Bishopton Road West, which has an overall capacity of 2,200 including 600 available seat and corporate area including bar. They are managed by former player Michael Dunwell, who retired from playing in 2014.

The club are notable for reaching the final of the FA Vase in the 2017–18 season, where they finished as runners-up, after being defeated 1–0 by champions Thatcham Town. Their previous success includes four consecutive Wearside Football League titles between 2012 and 2016, two consecutive Wearside League Cup titles between 2014 and 2016, two consecutive Monkwearmouth Charity Cup titles between 2014 and 2016, as well as winning the Shipowners Charity Cup in the 2014–15 season.

Their club badge, which includes their motto, "Fortitudo et Spes" (Latin for "Strength and Hope"), is navy and yellow, representing their traditional colours. The historic club nickname, "the Anchors", is taken from the Stockton coat of arms, representing the town's shipbuilding history during the seventeenth and eighteenth centuries.

== History ==
The club was initially formed in 1979 as Hartburn Juniors, entering a 5-a-side league in Middlesbrough to give youngsters an opportunity to play organised football. The club changed to their name to Stockton Town in 2003.

For the 2009–10 season, a senior team was entered into the Teesside League Division Two and finished in fourth place in their first season. In the summer of 2010, the club applied for membership to the Wearside League and were accepted for the 2010–11 season where they finished in tenth place. In the 2011–12 season, the club finished third in the league and lost in the final of the League Cup.

The club won their first league title in the 2012–13 season, and repeated the feat in their following league campaign, finishing the season with a league record of 104 points. At the end of the 2014–15 season, the club applied for qualification for the Northern League Division Two. However, despite winning the league title for a third time, their application was withdrawn due to legal issues.

In the 2015–16 season, the club won their fourth consecutive league title to gain promotion to Northern League. The following season, the club played their first ever FA Vase tie, beating Eccleshill United 2–0, before gaining their most famous victory to date, beating four-time winners, Whitley Bay, 2–0 in the next round. On 15 April, the club won 2–1 at Team Northumbria, to clinch the Division Two title and gain promotion to the Northern Football League Division One.

In only their second ever Northern League campaign, Stockton reached the final of the 2017–18 FA Vase. They played Thatcham Town of the Hellenic League. The final, played at Wembley Stadium, took place on 20 May, with Stockton narrowly losing by 1–0. Furthermore, that season's semi-final against Marske United, taking place on home turf and resulting in a 2–0 victory in Stockton's favour, saw the ground record broken, with an attendance of 3,300 (1,800 of Stockton).

In the 2019–20 season, Stockton were leading the table by 13 points with eight games left to play. However, as a result of the COVID-19 pandemic, the Football Association ruled that the entire league would be expunged, with no sides in the league being promoted or relegated, thus denying Stockton promotion despite being top of the league. Representatives from the team and local Member of Parliament, Alex Cunningham, protested against the movement though the ruling stayed in force. After the 2020–21 season was curtailed for the second consecutive season, results from both seasons were combined, which resulted in Stockton Town being promoted to the eighth tier of English football, joining the newly formed Northern Premier League Division One East for the 2021–22 season. In their first season, Stockton reached the play-off final, but lost 2–1 to Marske United. In the following 2022–23 season, Stockton lost the play-off final on penalties to Long Eaton United. In the 2023–24 season, Stockton reached the play-off final in the third season in a row, this time winning on penalties to Dunston, earning promotion to the Northern Premier League Premier Division.

In the 2024–25 season, Stockton Town progressed to the third qualifying round of the FA Cup for the first time in their history after defeating Marine 3–2 at home. In the third round they drew 1–1 at home to Chester, but lost the replay 1–0. Due to their promotion the previous season, Stockton also played in the third qualifying round of the FA Trophy for the first time, winning away to Blyth Spartans 0–2. Stockton went on to win the first round proper, defeating Newton Aycliffe at home 2–1, in the second round against Scarborough Athletic 3–1, and against Oldham Athletic in a 2-0 giant killing at home in the third round. In the fourth round, Stockton were drawn away to Rochdale, but the match was postponed and moved to Stockton's ground. The match finished 0-0, with Stockton losing 4-3 in penalties.

Stockton finished third in their first season in the Northern Premier League Premier Division, qualifying for the play-offs. They beat Guiseley 1-0 on 29 April 2025. However, the club was disqualified from the competition for fielding an ineligible player, namely captain Adam Nicholson, who had been sent-off in the last regular game of the season against Hyde United. Stockton believed Nicholson's suspension did not start until 3 May 2025. The club was charged by the FA, with the Northern Premier League confirming that Nicholson was ineligible to play for the semi-final. As a result, Guiseley progressed to the final instead.

In the 2025–26 season, Stockton qualified for the final of the Durham Challenge Cup, having defeated Farringdon Detached, Hebburn Town, Dunston and Horden CW on route. The final was originally going to take place at Sunderland's Stadium of Light on 14 April 2026, where they will play Shildon, but it was rescheduled to played at Bishop Auckland F.C. Stockton lost the final 2-0. In the league, Stockton were deducted three points in February 2026 after it was ruled that the club had wrongly played someone who was suspended in a game against Warrington Rylands in November. The club still qualified for the play-offs after finishing fifth, but were knocked out in the semi-finals by Hednesford Town.

== Ground ==
In April 2008, the club moved to facilities at Bishopton Road West in Stockton-on-Tees currently known as the MAP uk stadium. These facilities were built in partnership with the Football Foundation, Stockton Sixth Form College and Our Lady and St Bede Catholic Academy. In total, the project cost approximately £1.4 million, with close to £200,000 spent on the drainage of the pitches and the remainder on the new building containing 6 new changing rooms, 2 changing rooms for officials, an educational room, a club room and a drama and dance studio.

In July 2015, the club narrowly won approval from planners for expansion, at a cost of around £800,000. The plans, which had been recommended for approval by Stockton's planning officers, included fencing, flood lights, stands, dug outs, a turnstile, a changing block, a storage container and refreshments room. They had previously been given the green light a year previously to erect a 200-seat stand, floodlighting, artificial (3G) turf pitch, pay booth, changing facilities and toilet and refreshment areas. However, the expansion had met with a mixed response from residents, with 69 letters of objection submitted against 50 in support. A 105-signature petition of support was also submitted by the principal of Stockton Sixth Form college, insisting that students would benefit from the scheme.

== Players ==
=== Current squad ===
As of 23 June 2026

Note: Flags indicate national team as defined under FIFA eligibility rules; some limited exceptions apply. Players may hold more than one non-FIFA nationality.

Pos.	Nation	Player
GK	ENG	Nathan Harker
DF	ENG	Lewis King
DF	ENG	Tom Coulthard
DF	ENG	Adam Nicholson
DF	ENG	Joshua Baggs
DF	SCO	Owen Gallacher
DF	WAL	Ryan Barrett
DF	ENG	Aaron Brown
DF	IRL	Paul Rooney
MF	ENG	Cameron Painter
MF	ENG	Jake Petitjean
MF	ENG	Thomas Birtles

Pos.	Nation	Player
MF	ENG	Glen Butterworth
MF	ENG	Layton Watts
MF	ENG	Luca McHugh
FW	ENG	Stephen Thompson
FW	ENG	Josh Scott
FW	ENG	Michael Sweet
FW	ENG	Jaedon Faulkner
FW	ENG	Frank Nouble
	ENG	Harry Christy
	ENG	Seb Waller
	ENG	Chuka Unigwe

== Management team ==
As of 24 September 2022

Role	Name
Manager	(England) Michael Dunwell
Assistant manager	(England) J.D. Briggs
First team coach	(England) John Fielding
Goalkeeping coach	(England) Jason Hamilton
Injury Rehabilitation / Strength & Conditioning Coach	(England) Sam Higgins

== Records ==
- Best FA Cup performance: Third qualifying round, 2024–25 (replay)
- Best FA Trophy performance: Fourth round, 2024–25
- Best FA Vase performance: Runners-up, 2017–18

== Honours ==
League

- Northern Premier League East Division
  - Play-off winners: 2024
- Northern Football League Division One
  - Promoted: 2020–21 (combined results of two previously curtailed seasons)
- Northern Football League Division Two
  - Champions: 2016–17
- Wearside Football League
  - Champions: 2012–13, 2013–14, 2014–15, 2015–16

Cup

- Durham Challenge Cup
  - Runners-up: 2025–26
- FA Vase
  - Runners-up: 2017–18
- Northern League Ernest Armstrong Trophy
  - Runners-up: 2016–17
- Wearside League Cup
  - Winners: 2014–15, 2015–16
- Monkwearmouth Charity Cup
  - Winners: 2014–15, 2015–16
- Shipowners Charity Cup
  - Winners: 2014–15

== See also ==
- Norton and Stockton Ancients F.C.
- Stockton RFC
- Stockton Cricket Club
