= Graham Lewis (footballer) =

English footballer (born 1982)

Personal information
- Date of birth: 15 February 1982 (age 44)
- Place of birth: Reading, England
- Position: Forward

Youth career
- 1998–2000: Lincoln City

Senior career*
Years	Team	Apps	(Gls)
1999–2001	Lincoln City	7	(0)
2000–2001	Northwich Victoria	12	(2)
2000–2001	→ Frickley Athletic (loan)		
2001–2003	Frickley Athletic		
2002–2003	→ Belper Town (loan)		
2002–2003	Lincoln United		
2003–2004	Goole		
2003–2004	Brigg Town		
2003–2004	Ilkeston Town		
2003–2004	Gedling Town		
2004–2005	Lincoln Moorlands		
2005–2006	Reading Town		
2006–2008	Bracknell Town		
2007–2008	Burnham		
2008–2010	Reading Town	32	(22)
2010–2011	Thatcham Town		
2010–2011	Abingdon United		
2011–2012	Reading Town		
2012–2013	Marlow		
2026-	Woodley Saints Sharks		
- * Club domestic league appearances and goals as of 04:11, 16 March 2009 (UTC)

Graham Lewis (born 15 February 1982) is an English footballer. He played as a professional for Lincoln City.

Having been a member of the Centre of Excellence at home-town Reading, Graham Lewis began his senior career in the Lincoln City youth scheme, making his professional debut at the age of 17 in the 5–2 defeat at Torquay United in September 1999. A pacy forward, he would go on to make five appearances in the 1999–2000 season, the second year of his youth training. Lewis was offered a three-month professional contract for the 2000–2001 season by the newly installed Lincoln manager Phil Stant which he accepted and made a further two league appearances before being released at the end of this contract.

He linked up with Northwich Victoria, who were then managed by the one-time Lincoln manager Keith Alexander. Having only just turned 19, and to gain experience, he was loaned out to Frickley Athletic at the beginning of 2001. He impressed at Frickley and earned a recall to Northwich in February 2001, marking his return with a goal against Boston United and then making regular appearances for the remainder of the season.

In August 2001, he joined Frickley Athletic permanently, the Yorkshire club paying a club record fee to secure his services, He struggled for goals in the 2001–2002 season, scoring just seven league goals which included a hat-trick against Whitby Town in September 2001.

In August 2002, he joined Belper Town on a three-month loan deal. His debut, as a substitute, for Belper against Ossett Town was almost prevented after the assistant referee and referee claimed he had not been named on the team sheet, only relenting when the Belper secretary pointed out to the officials the new format of the team sheet showing clearly that Lewis was a valid substitute. In October 2002, he moved to Lincoln United on loan, scoring on his debut in a 3–2 defeat to Trafford. In January 2003, the move to Lincoln was made permanent.

He commenced the 2003–2004 season with short spells with Goole and Brigg Town. In November 2003, he joined Ilkeston Town, linking up with his former Lincoln City manager Phil Stant who had recently been appointed manager of the Derbyshire side. He moved on to Gedling Town in February 2004 before joining Lincoln Moorlands at the start of the 2004–2005 season.

Lewis relocated back to his home area of Reading and linked up with Reading Town at the start of the 2005–2006 season. A successful season saw him score 21 times and step-up the non-league pyramid to join Bracknell Town in August 2006. In March 2008, Lewis moved on to Burnham. In August 2008, Lewis returned to Reading Town for a second spell for the 2008–09 season. After scoring sixty-six goals in just over 100 games in his career with the club, Lewis joined Thatcham Town in July 2010 and marked his Southern Football League Division One South & West debut for the club with a hat-trick in the 5–0 home victory over Clevedon Town on 14 August 2010. In November 2010 he joined league rivals Abingdon United, debuting in the 3–1 league defeat at Almondsbury Town on 27 November 2010. In July 2011 he agreed to rejoin Reading Town. In July 2012, along with a number of teammates, he followed his Reading Town manager Mark Bartley in joining Marlow.
