= 2020–21 Northern Football League =

Northern Football League
- Season: 2020–21

The 2020–21 season was the 123rd in the history of the Northern Football League, a football competition in England. The league has operated two divisions in the English football league system, Division One at step 5, and Division Two at step 6.

The allocations for Steps 5 and 6 for season 2020–21 were announced by the FA on 21 July, and were subject to appeal.

Due to the restrictions on clubs' ability to play matches in the COVID-19 lockdowns, competitions at Steps 3–6 were curtailed on 24 February 2021. The scheduled restructuring of non-league took place at the end of the season, with a new division added to the Northern Premier League at Step 4 for 2021–22, resulting in three Northern League clubs' promotions to that league.

== Division One ==
Northern Football League Division One
- Season: 2020–21
- Promoted: Hebburn Town; Shildon; Stockton Town
- Matches: 118
- Goals: 457 (3.87 per match)

Division One comprised 20 teams, the same number of teams which competed in the previous season's aborted competition.

=== Division One table ===
Pos	Team	Pld	W	D	L	GF	GA	GD	Pts	Promotion
1	Hebburn Town	12	11	0	1	49	11	+38	33	Promoted to the Northern Premier League (Note: Promoted based on points per game calculations from the 2019–20 and 2020–21 seasons combined.)
2	Stockton Town	12	8	3	1	32	8	+24	27	Promoted to the Northern Premier League
3	Consett	12	9	0	3	32	19	+13	27	
4	North Shields	11	8	2	1	27	12	+15	26	
5	Newton Aycliffe	12	6	4	2	31	15	+16	22	
6	Newcastle Benfield	13	7	1	5	35	23	+12	22	
7	Whitley Bay	11	7	1	3	27	18	+9	22	
8	Shildon	11	6	3	2	26	11	+15	21	Promoted to the Northern Premier League
9	Thornaby	11	6	2	3	19	22	−3	20	
10	Whickham	13	5	2	6	18	21	−3	17	
11	West Auckland Town	13	5	2	6	21	29	−8	17	
12	Ashington	11	5	1	5	23	24	−1	16	
13	Sunderland RCA	12	4	1	7	25	23	+2	13	
14	Northallerton Town	13	3	3	7	10	30	−20	12	
15	Sunderland Ryhope CW	10	3	2	5	11	18	−7	11	
16	Guisborough Town	12	2	3	7	20	35	−15	9	
17	Penrith	11	3	0	8	15	34	−19	9	
18	Bishop Auckland	12	1	2	9	12	30	−18	5	
19	Seaham Red Star	11	1	2	8	10	31	−21	5	
20	Billingham Town	13	1	0	12	14	43	−29	3	

Source: NL website
Rules for classification: 1) Points; 2) Goal difference; 3) Number of goals scored; 4) Number of matches won; 5) Head-to-head results

=== Stadia and locations ===
Location of Division One clubs

Club	Stadium	Capacity
Ashington	Woodhorn Lane	
Billingham Town	Bedford Terrace	3,000
Bishop Auckland	Heritage Park	1,950
Consett	Belle View Stadium	
Guisborough Town	King George V Ground	
Hebburn Town	Hebburn Sports & Social Ground	
Newcastle Benfield	Sam Smith’s Park	2,000
Newton Aycliffe	Moore Lane Park	
Northallerton Town	Calvert Stadium	
North Shields	Ralph Gardner Park	1,500
Penrith	Frenchfield Stadium	1,500
Ryhope Colliery Welfare	Ryhope Recreation Ground	
Seaham Red Star	Seaham Town Park	
Shildon	Dean Street	2,000
Stockton Town	Bishopton Road West	1,800
Sunderland RCA	Meadow Park	1,500
Thornaby	Teesdale Park	5,000
West Auckland Town	Darlington Road	2,000
Whickham	Glebe Sports Ground	4,000
Whitley Bay	Hillheads Park	4,500

== Division Two ==
Northern Football League Division Two
- Season: 2020–21
- Promoted: Crook Town; Redcar Athletic; West Allotment Celtic
- Matches: 118
- Goals: 447 (3.79 per match)

Division Two comprised the same 20 teams which competed in the previous season's aborted competition.

=== Division Two table ===
Pos	Team	Pld	W	D	L	GF	GA	GD	Pts	Promotion
1	West Allotment Celtic	12	7	3	2	25	16	+9	24	Promoted to Division One (Note: Promoted based on points per game calculations from the 2019–20 and 2020–21 seasons combined.)
2	Crook Town	12	7	2	3	33	17	+16	23	Promoted to Division One
3	Carlisle City	11	7	2	2	25	17	+8	23	
4	Billingham Synthonia	11	7	1	3	31	11	+20	22	
5	Tow Law Town	12	6	2	4	22	19	+3	20	
6	Bedlington Terriers	11	6	2	3	19	16	+3	20	
7	Birtley Town	13	5	5	3	18	19	−1	20	
8	Easington Colliery	10	7	1	2	32	17	+15	19 (Note: Easington Colliery deducted three points for fielding an ineligible player.)	
9	Newcastle University	11	5	4	2	17	15	+2	19	
10	Redcar Athletic	11	5	3	3	19	14	+5	18	Promoted to Division One
11	Heaton Stannington	12	4	5	3	26	15	+11	17	
12	Chester-le-Street Town	12	5	2	5	29	20	+9	17	
13	Brandon United	12	4	3	5	20	27	−7	15	
14	Willington	13	5	0	8	19	27	−8	15	
15	Esh Winning	12	5	0	7	22	31	−9	15	
16	Ryton & Crawcrook Albion	14	3	3	8	21	26	−5	12	
17	Sunderland West End	12	3	2	7	15	30	−15	11	
18	Jarrow	12	3	1	8	17	31	−14	10	
19	Washington	10	2	2	6	18	29	−11	8	
20	Durham City	13	0	1	12	19	50	−31	1	

Source: NL website
Rules for classification: 1) Points; 2) Goal difference; 3) Number of goals scored; 4) Number of matches won; 5) Head-to-head results

=== Stadia and locations ===
Location of Division Two clubs

Club	Stadium	Capacity
Bedlington Terriers	Welfare Park	3,000
Billingham Synthonia	Norton Sports Complex	1,970
Birtley Town	Birtley Sports Complex	
Brandon United	Welfare Ground	
Carlisle City	Gillford Park	
Chester-le-Street Town	Moor Park	
Crook Town	The Sir Tom Cowie Millfield Ground	1,500
Easington Colliery	Welfare Park	
Esh Winning	West Terrace	3,500
Heaton Stannington	Grounsell Park	
Jarrow	Perth Green	
Newcastle University	Kimberley Park	
Redcar Athletic	Green Lane	
Ryton & Crawcrook Albion	Kingsley Park	1,500
Sunderland West End	Nissan Sports Complex	1,000
Tow Law Town	Ironworks Road	3,000
Washington	New Ferens Park	
West Allotment Celtic	Sam Smith’s Park (groundshare with Newcastle Benfield)	2,000
Willington	Hall Lane	
Durham City	Hall Lane	
