= Michael Dunwell =

English footballer and manager

Personal information
- Full name: Michael Dunwell
- Date of birth: 6 January 1980 (age 46)
- Place of birth: Stockton-on-Tees, England
- Position: Forward

Senior career*
Years	Team	Apps	(Gls)
1998–1999	Hartlepool United	1	(0)
- Bishop Auckland
- Durham City
2005–2008	Billingham Synthonia	37	(11)
- Norton & Stockton Ancients
- Billingham Town
- Northallerton Town
2013–2014	Stockton Town		

Managerial career
- 2014–: Stockton Town
- * Club domestic league appearances and goals

Michael Dunwell (born 6 January 1980) is an English football manager and former professional player. He is the manager of Northern Premier League Premier Division side Stockton Town. In his playing career, he played as a forward for Hartlepool United, Bishop Auckland, Durham City, Billingham Synthonia, Norton & Stockton Ancients, Billingham Town, Northallerton Town and Stockton Town.

== Early life ==
Dunwell was born and raised in the Stockton-on-Tees area.

== Playing career ==
Dunwell began his career at Hartlepool United in 1996, and spent four seasons there, making one league appearance during the 1998–99 season. before going on to play for clubs such as Bishop Auckland, Durham City, Billingham Synthonia, Norton & Stockton Ancients, Billingham Town, Northallerton Town and Stockton Town.

== Management career ==
Dunwell was a player-coach at Billingham Town and Stockton Town. He became Stockton Town first team manager in the summer of 2014, after retiring from his playing career. He appointed J.D. Briggs as his assistant manager; the duo had previously played together for many years and are long-time friends.

When Stockton qualified for the Northern Football League Second Division, he guided the club to automatic promotion to the first division, having finished as the second division champions. Stockton then gained promotion to the newly-formed Northern Premier League Division One East for the 2021–22 season, having finished as runners-up of the Northern League Division One for the 2020–21 season.
