= Gavin James (footballer) =

Vincentian international footballer (born 1989)

Personal information
- Date of birth: 6 January 1989 (age 37)
- Place of birth: High Wycombe, England
- Position: Striker

Team information
- Current team: Ardley United

Youth career
- 2005–2006: Beaconsfield SYCOB
- 2006–2007: Wycombe Wanderers

Senior career*
Years	Team	Apps	(Gls)
2007–2009	Maidenhead United	40	(2)
2008	→ Wealdstone (loan)	6	(3)
2011	Marlow	28	(6)
2012	Burnham	15	(7)
2012–2013	Beaconsfield SYCOB	25	(3)
2013–2015	Flackwell Heath	96	(70)
2015–2016	Maidenhead United	22	(2)
2016–2018	Slough Town	51	(17)
2017	→ Metropolitan Police (loan)	8	(4)
2018	→ Thatcham Town (loan)	10	(5)
2018-2019	Bracknell Town	16	(5)
2019-2021	Burnham	42	(20)
2021-2022	Aylesbury United	11	(5)
2022-2023	Risborough Rangers	23	(11)
2023-2025	Ardley United	58	(22)

International career
2015–	St Vincent and the Grenadines	9	(1)
- * Club domestic league appearances and goals as of 12 May 2018

Gavin James (born 6 January 1989) is a Vincentian international footballer who plays as a striker for Ardley United.

== International career ==
He qualifies to play international football for Saint Vincent and the Grenadines through his parents, and on 10 June 2015, he made his debut against Guyana in a FIFA World Cup 2018 preliminary round qualifier.

The Guyana Football Federation later protested his eligibility as he was not in possession of a Vincentian passport during the time he played against them. He did, however have confirmation that he held a Vincentian citizenship in the form of a stamp on his British passport. FIFA decided to take no action and told Guyana that "no further intervention was necessary".

== Honours ==
Thatcham Town

- FA Vase: 2017-18
