= Sunderland West End F.C. =

Association football club in England

Coordinates: 54°54′28.7″N 1°26′17.5″W

Sunderland West End
- Full name: Sunderland West End Football Club
- Ground: Ford Quarry, Sunderland
- Chairman: Anthony Nelson/David Keithley
- Manager: Dan Martin
- League: Wearside League Premier
- Northern League Division Two, 15th of 22 (resigned)
Home colours

Sunderland West End Football Club is a football club based in Sunderland, Tyne and Wear, England. They are currently members of the Northern League Division Two and play at the Ford Quarry Hub.

== History ==
Sunderland West End played in the inaugural Wearside League season in 1892–93, finishing bottom after winning just one game in eighteen. In the following season, West End again finished bottom with one win. Sunderland West End returned to the Wearside League in the 1900–01 season, finishing third, before finishing just one point behind league winners Sunderland Rovers in the 1901–02 season. On 10 December 1904, Sunderland West End suffered a 9–0 defeat against Bradford City in the FA Cup sixth qualifying round. In the first full season after the culmination of World War I, West End finished fourth, before finishing second, behind Seaham Harbour, in the 1920–21 season. The club finished fourth for four consecutive seasons thereafter, before a decline in the second half of the 1920s saw the club play their final campaign in the league in the 1929–30 season, finishing second from bottom.

In 2011, Houghton Town changed its name to Sunderland West End, signaling the first time in 81 years a club by the name of Sunderland West End had competed in the Wearside League. West End finished runners-up in the 2018–19 Wearside League season, gaining promotion to the Northern League Division Two. Sunderland West End entered the FA Vase for the first time in 2019–20. The club has been in the Northern League Div 2 since finishing 17th 2019/20 and 20/21 during Covid Seasons. Since then 9th 2021/22, 20th 2022/23 and 20th 2023/24.

Before the start of the 2024/25 season, the club had a tight relationship with the community through sponsorship and memberships. There was a buzz around the place and that led to a great season. They finished 8th in the Northern League Division 2 and just eleven points from the play-offs. FA Vase 1st Round qualifying round, Durham Challenge Cup 2nd round, Ernest Armstrong 2nd round, and the Brooks Mileson Memorial League Cup Quarter Finals.

Sunderland West End F.C. will withdraw from the Northern League following the 2025–26 season.

The club then re-joined the Wearside Premier League for the start of the 2026/27 season.

== Ground ==
The club currently play at the Ford Quarry Hub in Sunderland.

== Records ==
- Best FA Cup performance: Sixth qualifying round, 1904–05
- Best FA Vase performance: Second qualifying round, 2019–20
