= Harry Grant (footballer) =

English footballer

Personal information
- Full name: Harry Edward Grant
- Date of birth: 31 December 1993 (age 32)
- Place of birth: Reading, England
- Position: Midfielder

Team information
- Current team: Hayes & Yeading United

Youth career
- 2004–2007: Reading
- 2008–2011: Swindon Town

Senior career*
Years	Team	Apps	(Gls)
2012–2013	Sheffield Wednesday	2	(0)
2013	→ Gillingham (loan)	2	(0)
2013	Gillingham	5	(0)
2013–2014	→ Maidenhead United (loan)	37	(12)
2014	Bromley	21	(2)
2014–2015	→ Farnborough (loan)	32	(10)
2015	Hayes & Yeading United	7	(0)
2015–2016	Chippenham Town	31	(4)
2016–2017	Reading City	28	(11)
2017–2018	Thatcham Town	38	(14)
2018–2021	North Leigh	60	(5)
2022–2025	Ascot United	142	(15)
2025	Hartley Wintney	16	(1)
2025–	Hayes & Yeading United	29	(6)
- * Club domestic league appearances and goals as of 17:16, 15 December 2025 (UTC)

Harry Edward Grant (born 31 December 1993) is an English footballer who plays as a midfielder for Isthmian League South Central Division club Hayes & Yeading United.

== Playing career ==
Grant is a former professional footballer who played as a central midfielder. He began his football career at Swindon Town, where he was named captain of the youth team.

Grant's professional career began in June 2012, when he signed a two-year contract with Sheffield Wednesday, under the management of Dave Jones . During his time with the club, Grant played for the Sheffield Wednesday Development Squad in the U21 Development League, where he scored 13 goals in 24 games in the 2012–2013 season.

In March 2013, Grant was loaned out to Gillingham, where he made his debut for the club on 27 April 2013. He played 70 minutes in their title-winning game against Burton Albion at the Pirelli Stadium.

Grant was then loaned out to Maidenhead United, where he made a promising start by scoring the winning goal on his debut in the fourth round of the 2013–14 FA Trophy. He ended his loan spell with a return of twelve goals in 37 appearances, which helped the team avoid relegation.

Grant then moved on to play for Bromley in the 2014–15 season, where he made 21 appearances. He was then loaned out to Farnborough for the remainder of the season, where he scored 10 goals in 32 appearances.

Grant went on to play for Hayes & Yeading United and Chippenham Town before joining Thatcham Town. As well as securing victory in the 2017-18 FA Vase at Wembley Stadium, Grant played a key role in Thatcham Town's win of the 2017–18 Hellenic Football League in the same season.

In June 2022, Grant signed for Ascot United. He was a key figure during a historic campaign in which the club secured the 2022–23 Combined Counties Football League title with a record 102 points and triumphed in the 2022–23 FA Vase at Wembley Stadium. Grant captained the team to a fourth-place finish in the 2024–25 Isthmian League South Central Division, the club's highest ever league position, qualifying for the play-offs, where they were defeated by Hanworth Villa. Grant departed the club in the summer of 2025 following the exit of manager Jamie Tompkins.

In December 2025, Grant returned to Hayes & Yeading United for a third spell, reuniting with former manager Jamie Tompkins.

== Honours ==
Gillingham

- Football League Two: 2012–13

Bromley

- National League South: 2014–15 Football Conference

Thatcham Town

- 2017-18 FA Vase
- 2017–18 Hellenic Football League

Ascot United

- 2022-23 Combined Counties Football League
- 2022-23 FA Vase
