= 2021–22 Northern Premier League =

The 2021–22 season was the 54th season of the Northern Premier League. The league consists of four divisions, the Premier Division at Step 3 of the National League System, and the West, East and Midlands divisions at Step 4. The NPL continued this season with main sponsors Entain's Pitching In.

As the previous season was curtailed due to the COVID-19 pandemic, with all results finalised, the Trident Leagues along with The Football Association decided to make the realignment to leagues at Steps 4, 5 and 6.

== Premier Division ==
Northern Premier League Premier Division
- Season: 2021–22
- Champions: Buxton
- Promoted: Buxton; Scarborough Athletic
- Relegated: Witton Albion; Grantham Town
- Matches: 462
- Goals: 1,202 (2.6 per match)
- Top goalscorer: 26 goals - Jacob Hazel (Whitby Town)
- Total attendance: 212,646
- Average attendance: 642

The Premier Division comprised the same set of 22 teams which competed in the aborted competition the previous season.

=== League table ===
Pos	Team	Pld	W	D	L	GF	GA	GD	Pts	Promotion, qualification or relegation
1	Buxton (C, P)	42	23	12	7	80	38	+42	81	Promoted to the National League North
2	South Shields	42	23	9	10	71	40	+31	78	Qualified for the play-offs (Note: Four teams played for one spot and promotion to the National League North.)
3	Scarborough Athletic (O, P)	42	21	11	10	61	48	+13	74	Qualified for the play-offs
4	Matlock Town	42	21	10	11	59	36	+23	72 (Note: Matlock Town were deducted one point for fielding an ineligible player.)	Qualified for the play-offs
5	Warrington Town	42	20	11	11	67	47	+20	71	Qualified for the play-offs
6	Bamber Bridge	42	21	6	15	67	59	+8	69	
7	Whitby Town	42	19	9	14	57	50	+7	66	
8	Stafford Rangers	42	15	16	11	55	39	+16	61	
9	FC United of Manchester	42	18	7	17	66	57	+9	61	
10	Morpeth Town	42	17	10	15	67	59	+8	61	
11	Lancaster City	42	17	5	20	44	51	−7	56	
12	Mickleover	42	15	10	17	54	65	−11	55	Transferred to the Southern League Premier Division Central
13	Nantwich Town	42	14	10	18	46	52	−6	52	
14	Ashton United	42	13	12	17	50	59	−9	51	
15	Radcliffe	42	15	6	21	56	73	−17	51	
16	Gainsborough Trinity	42	12	14	16	40	52	−12	50	
17	Hyde United	42	14	8	20	52	65	−13	50	
18	Stalybridge Celtic	42	15	7	20	51	59	−8	49 (Note: Stalybridge Celtic were deducted 3 points for fielding an ineligible player.)	
19	Atherton Collieries	42	13	9	20	34	45	−11	48	Reprieved from relegation (Note: Due to expansion of Step 2 divisions and in order to make up the number of clubs in Step 3 and higher divisions, seven clubs at Step 3, all four fourth-from-bottom teams and those placed third-from-bottom that are the top three based on points per game (PPG), were reprieved from relegation.)
20	Basford United	42	12	9	21	32	49	−17	45	Reprieved from relegation, then transferred to the Southern League Premier Division Central
21	Witton Albion (R)	42	12	7	23	48	78	−30	43	Relegated to Division One West
22	Grantham Town (R)	42	8	10	24	45	81	−36	34	Relegated to Division One East

Source: NPL official site
Rules for classification: 1) points; 2) goal difference; 3) number of goals scored; 4) number of matches won; 5) head-to-head results
(C) Champions; (O) Play-off winners; (P) Promoted; (R) Relegated

=== Top goalscorers ===
Rank	Player	Club	Goals
1	(Saint Kitts and Nevis) Jacob Hazel	Whitby Town	26
2	(Italy) Diego De Girolamo	Buxton	20
3	(England) Andrew Johnson	Morpeth Town	18
3	(Wales) Callum Saunders	Witton Albion	18
5	(England) Jordan Buckley	Warrington Town	17
5	(Northern Ireland) Jamie Ward	Buxton	17
7	(England) Bobby Grant	Radcliffe	16
8	(England) Paul Dawson	Bamber Bridge; Lancaster City (6)	14
8	(England) Regan Linney	F.C. United of Manchester	14
10	(England) Joshua Amis	Warrington Town	12
10	(England) Liam Henderson	Morpeth Town	12
10	(England) JJ Hooper	South Shields	12
10	(England) Luca Navarro	Radcliffe; Stafford Rangers (3)	12

=== Results table ===
Home \ Away	ASH	ATH	BAM	BAS	BUX	UOM	GAI	GRA	HYD	LNC	MAT	MIC	MOR	NAN	RAD	SCA	SOU	STA	STL	WAR	WHI	WIT
Ashton United		2–2	0–0	3–0	1–1	0–3	2–1	2–2	0–3	1–0	2–0	3–0	1–2	2–1	3–1	0–0	1–0	0–0	2–1	0–1	1–3	0–1
Atherton Collieries	1–2		2–0	3–0	0–0	2–1	0–1	1–0	0–1	3–1	2–1	1–2	1–1	0–2	1–0	1–2	1–1	1–1	0–1	0–2	0–1	0–0
Bamber Bridge	0–1	1–2		1–0	0–4	0–0	5–1	2–1	4–1	2–1	2–4	2–2	3–2	1–1	1–1	0–2	3–0	1–3	0–2	2–2	3–0	2–0
Basford United	0–0	2–0	0–1		1–3	0–1	2–0	0–1	2–0	1–0	0–1	0–1	1–2	1–0	1–2	0–0	1–1	1–1	1–1	0–1	1–1	2–2
Buxton	3–0	2–0	3–0	1–0		1–2	1–0	3–0	3–0	0–0	1–0	3–1	2–2	1–1	3–0	5–1	2–2	2–3	2–0	3–3	4–1	3–1
FC United of Manchester	4–3	2–0	1–0	3–2	1–1		3–2	0–1	0–2	1–0	1–1	2–0	3–0	0–2	3–0	6–0	0–1	1–3	2–1	0–1	3–4	2–0
Gainsborough Trinity	1–1	1–0	2–0	1–0	0–0	3–2		2–2	1–1	3–1	1–2	2–0	2–1	0–0	1–1	0–2	1–1	1–1	1–0	1–1	1–0	1–1
Grantham Town	4–3	0–1	1–2	1–1	0–3	1–2	1–1		2–0	2–7	1–3	1–1	3–2	0–1	1–2	1–2	1–0	0–1	0–0	1–2	0–2	2–3
Hyde United	2–1	0–1	0–4	0–1	1–2	2–1	1–0	3–0		0–1	2–3	1–4	2–2	1–0	1–3	3–2	1–2	1–0	2–2	2–1	1–2	3–2
Lancaster City	3–2	0–0	0–1	1–0	1–0	1–0	0–2	1–1	0–0		0–2	3–0	1–0	1–0	2–1	0–2	1–0	0–2	2–0	0–1	0–1	0–1
Matlock Town	1–1	0–1	2–1	2–1	2–1	1–0	3–0	0–0	2–1	0–1		1–0	0–0	0–0	0–0	0–0	0–1	2–3	2–1	2–0	2–3	9–0
Mickleover	2–1	2–0	0–1	0–1	3–3	3–3	2–0	2–2	3–2	3–1	2–1		0–4	0–0	4–1	1–2	1–0	0–0	1–3	2–2	1–2	2–1
Morpeth Town	2–0	2–0	1–3	2–1	3–0	1–0	2–0	2–1	2–2	2–2	0–0	3–1		1–2	3–1	0–3	1–0	2–2	1–1	2–0	2–0	1–2
Nantwich Town	2–2	2–2	0–1	0–1	1–3	2–0	2–1	1–0	0–2	0–2	0–1	0–1	2–3		2–3	2–1	0–0	2–1	3–2	1–1	1–0	1–0
Radcliffe	0–2	1–0	2–3	3–0	2–3	3–3	2–0	1–2	3–2	2–0	0–1	3–1	1–5	3–1		0–1	0–4	0–1	2–1	0–2	4–3	2–0
Scarborough Athletic	1–1	0–1	2–4	3–0	2–1	2–2	2–0	2–0	1–1	2–0	0–0	1–1	1–1	3–0	5–2		0–2	1–1	0–3	2–0	2–1	3–2
South Shields	1–1	2–1	4–2	0–1	0–1	1–1	3–1	4–1	1–2	2–1	3–1	3–0	2–0	4–2	2–0	1–0		2–0	4–0	3–2	2–3	3–1
Stafford Rangers	5–0	1–1	1–2	0–1	0–1	0–2	0–0	4–1	0–0	1–2	2–0	1–1	3–1	2–2	2–0	0–1	1–1		2–0	0–1	0–0	1–1
Stalybridge Celtic	1–0	1–0	1–2	0–2	1–0	5–2	1–1	5–0	1–1	3–0	0–2	0–1	2–0	1–5	0–2	0–1	1–3	2–1		0–3	2–1	2–2
Warrington Town	1–3	2–0	4–1	2–3	2–2	2–0	1–0	3–3	1–0	5–1	0–2	0–1	3–1	2–1	1–1	0–2	1–2	1–1	3–0		0–0	2–0
Whitby Town	2–0	0–2	2–0	0–0	0–0	1–0	1–2	3–0	1–0	0–3	2–2	4–2	2–1	2–0	0–0	3–0	2–2	1–3	0–1	1–1		0–1
Witton Albion	1–0	2–0	1–4	4–0	0–3	2–3	1–1	1–4	4–2	2–3	0–1	1–0	3–2	0–1	2–1	2–2	0–1	0–1	0–2	1–4	0–2	

Source: NPL Premier Division results grid
Legend: Blue = home team win; Yellow = draw; Red = away team win.

=== Play-offs ===
Semifinals
2	South Shields	1 (5)
5	Warrington Town (pen.)	1 (6)
3	Scarborough Athletic	2
4	Matlock Town	1

Final
5	Warrington Town	1
3	Scarborough Athletic	2

Semi-finals

26 April	South Shields	1–1 (a.e.t.) (5–6 p)	Warrington Town	South Shields
	Osei 19'		Buckley 52'	Stadium: Mariners Park; Attendance: 2,014

26 April	Scarborough Athletic	2–1	Matlock Town	Scarborough
	Jackson 74'; Colville 84'		Hughes 90'	Stadium: Flamingo Land Stadium; Attendance: 2,676

Final

2 May	Scarborough Athletic	2–1	Warrington Town	Scarborough
	Coulson 19'; Gooda 81'		Amis 36'; (red card) Duggan	Stadium: Flamingo Land Stadium; Attendance: 2,805

=== Stadia and locations ===
Locations of the 2021–22 Premier Division teams
Locations of Northern Premier League 2021–22 Premier Division teams (Greater Manchester)

Club	Location	Ground	Capacity
Ashton United	Ashton-under-Lyne	Hurst Cross	4,500
Atherton Collieries	Atherton	Alder Street	2,500
Bamber Bridge	Bamber Bridge	Irongate	2,264
Basford United	Nottingham (Basford)	Greenwich Avenue	2,200
Buxton	Buxton	The Silverlands	5,200
FC United of Manchester	Manchester (Moston)	Broadhurst Park	4,400
Gainsborough Trinity	Gainsborough	The Northolme	4,304
Grantham Town	Grantham	South Kesteven Sports Stadium	7,500
Hyde United	Hyde	Ewen Fields	4,250
Lancaster City	Lancaster	Giant Axe	3,500
Matlock Town	Matlock	Causeway Lane	2,214
Mickleover	Derby (Mickleover)	Station Road	1,500
Morpeth Town	Morpeth	Craik Park	1,500
Nantwich Town	Nantwich	The Weaver Stadium	3,500
Radcliffe	Radcliffe	Stainton Park	3,500
Scarborough Athletic	Scarborough	Flamingo Land Stadium	2,833
South Shields	South Shields	Mariners Park	3,500
Stafford Rangers	Stafford	Marston Road	4,000
Stalybridge Celtic	Stalybridge	Bower Fold	6,500
Warrington Town	Warrington	Cantilever Park	3,500
Whitby Town	Whitby	Turnbull Ground	3,500
Witton Albion	Northwich	Wincham Park	4,813

== Division One East ==
Northern Premier League Division One East
- Season: 2021–22
- Champions: Liversedge
- Promoted: Liversedge; Marske United
- Relegated: Yorkshire Amateur; Frickley Athletic; Pickering Town
- Matches: 342
- Goals: 1,099 (3.21 per match)
- Top goalscorer: 28 goals - Adam Boyes (Marske United)
- Total attendance: 114,372
- Average attendance: 334

When the divisions were realigned this became Division One East instead of Division One South East from the previous season. Division One East comprised 19 teams, with a vacancy left due to the withdrawal of Droylsden in the previous campaign.

=== Team changes ===
The following six clubs were promoted from Step 5 divisions:

- Bridlington Town – promoted from Northern Counties East League Premier Division
- Hebburn Town – promoted from Northern League Division One
- Liversedge – promoted from Northern Counties East League Premier Division
- Shildon – promoted from Northern League Division One
- Stockton Town – promoted from Northern League Division One
- Yorkshire Amateur – promoted from Northern Counties East League Premier Division

The following seven clubs transferred from the Division One North West:

- Dunston
- Marske United
- Tadcaster Albion
- Pickering Town
- Brighouse Town
- Pontefract Collieries
- Ossett United

=== League table ===
Pos	Team	Pld	W	D	L	GF	GA	GD	Pts	Promotion, qualification or relegation
1	Liversedge (C, P)	36	29	6	1	98	22	+76	93	Promoted to the Premier Division
2	Marske United (O, P)	36	28	4	4	94	34	+60	88	Qualified for the play-offs (Note: Four teams played for one spot and promotion to Level 7.)
3	Cleethorpes Town	36	21	6	9	74	46	+28	69	Qualified for the play-offs
4	Stockton Town	36	19	9	8	79	41	+38	66	Qualified for the play-offs
5	Shildon	36	19	6	11	61	35	+26	63	Qualified for the play-offs
6	Dunston	36	17	3	16	67	60	+7	54	
7	Brighouse Town	36	15	9	12	59	52	+7	54	
8	Worksop Town	36	16	6	14	56	53	+3	54	
9	Ossett United	36	15	8	13	43	59	−16	53	
10	Yorkshire Amateur (D)	36	14	5	17	55	63	−8	47	Demoted to the Northern Counties East League (Note: The FA relegated Yorkshire Amateur for not meeting Step 4 ground grading standards, sparing Sheffield from the relegation play-offs.)
11	Stocksbridge Park Steels	36	13	7	16	53	58	−5	46	
12	Pontefract Collieries	36	13	4	19	41	54	−13	43	
13	Hebburn Town	36	12	6	18	47	56	−9	42	
14	Tadcaster Albion	36	10	7	19	47	63	−16	37	
15	Bridlington Town	36	9	7	20	40	65	−25	34	
16	Lincoln United	36	9	7	20	56	91	−35	34	Reprieved from inter-step play-offs (Note: Ten of the 16 clubs at Step 4, all eight fourth-from-bottom teams and two sides placed third-from-bottom, one at the top and the other in third place on a points per game (PPG) basis, were reprieved from contesting relegation play-offs. The FA granted third-placed Sheffield a reprieve after demoting Yorkshire Amateur.)
17	Sheffield	36	8	9	19	47	77	−30	33	Reprieved from inter-step play-offs
18	Frickley Athletic (R)	36	8	6	22	30	67	−37	30	Relegated to the Northern Counties East League
19	Pickering Town (R)	36	7	5	24	52	103	−51	20 (Note: Pickering Town were deducted 6 points for fielding an ineligible player.)	Relegated to the Northern League

Source: NPL official site
Rules for classification: 1) points; 2) goal difference; 3) number of goals scored; 4) number of matches won; 5) head-to-head results
(C) Champions; (D) Disqualified; (O) Play-off winners; (P) Promoted; (R) Relegated

=== Top goalscorers ===
Rank	Player	Club	Goals
1	(England) Adam Boyes	Marske United	28
2	(England) Laurence Sorhaindo	Brighouse Town	23
3	(England) Matthew Cotton	Lincoln United	21
4	(England) Benjamin Atkinson	Liversedge	18
4	(England) Luke Mangham	Stocksbridge Park Steels	18
4	(England) Michael Roberts	Stockton Town	18
4	(England) Nicholas Walker	Liversedge	18
8	(England) Kevin Hayes	Stockton Town	16
8	(England) Dean Thexton	Shildon	16
9	(England) Marc Newsham	Sheffield	16
9	(England) Brody Robertson	Cleethorpes Town	16

=== Results table ===
Home \ Away	BRD	BRI	CLE	DUN	FRI	HEB	LIN	LIV	MAR	OSS	PIC	PON	SHE	SHI	STB	STC	TAD	WOR	YOR
Bridlington Town		1–4	1–2	3–2	1–1	0–0	4–2	2–2	0–5	2–0	5–2	2–0	0–2	2–1	0–0	1–3	0–4	0–1	2–1
Brighouse Town	1–0		0–2	0–0	3–1	3–1	3–2	1–2	0–3	2–0	5–1	1–1	2–2	0–1	2–1	1–3	1–1	1–1	1–2
Cleethorpes Town	1–0	3–2		1–1	3–0	0–2	4–4	2–4	3–4	7–1	2–0	0–2	3–1	1–2	3–1	0–0	0–0	0–0	1–1
Dunston	1–2	2–3	0–2		6–0	1–0	3–1	0–4	2–0	2–1	4–3	4–1	3–1	0–2	4–2	2–1	1–2	4–0	3–0
Frickley Athletic	2–0	2–1	1–2	1–2		0–1	1–4	0–2	0–3	0–1	1–2	1–3	2–2	1–1	1–0	0–3	2–0	0–1	1–4
Hebburn Town	3–0	1–3	0–4	2–1	0–1		2–1	1–1	0–2	2–1	2–2	0–1	1–0	1–2	1–5	1–4	2–3	3–0	4–2
Lincoln United	2–2	1–1	1–4	3–2	1–0	1–4		0–2	0–3	3–3	3–1	0–0	2–2	0–1	0–0	0–5	1–3	1–0	4–1
Liversedge	1–1	1–1	5–0	2–0	2–0	2–0	6–1		2–1	6–0	5–1	1–1	3–2	2–1	5–0	4–2	3–1	1–0	5–0
Marske United	2–1	4–1	2–0	4–0	4–0	1–1	1–0	0–2		1–1	5–2	1–0	6–1	2–0	2–1	1–2	3–2	3–2	4–0
Ossett United	0–0	1–0	1–3	1–1	4–2	2–1	2–1	0–5	1–3		1–1	1–3	3–2	2–1	3–0	2–1	1–0	1–0	1–0
Pickering Town	1–4	2–2	0–4	4–2	1–2	2–1	3–4	1–3	1–4	0–2		1–3	4–1	0–4	1–0	0–6	2–1	1–4	3–3
Pontefract Collieries	2–0	0–0	1–2	1–2	2–0	2–1	3–4	1–3	0–1	0–2	1–0		1–2	1–0	0–1	2–0	1–5	1–2	4–3
Sheffield	3–0	1–2	0–1	2–1	1–0	0–4	2–0	0–2	0–5	0–0	2–3	4–0		1–1	1–1	0–0	2–3	0–3	3–2
Shildon	2–0	3–1	3–0	2–1	2–2	1–0	2–1	0–3	1–2	0–0	4–0	4–0	5–1		2–2	0–0	2–1	3–0	1–2
Stocksbridge Park Steels	2–0	1–3	0–2	5–2	1–2	5–2	4–3	0–3	2–2	1–0	3–2	1–0	1–0	1–2		0–0	2–0	2–1	2–0
Stockton Town	2–1	3–2	2–3	3–0	1–1	2–1	3–1	0–0	2–2	4–0	4–1	3–1	3–3	1–0	3–2		4–0	0–1	1–1
Tadcaster Albion	2–1	1–2	1–4	1–2	2–0	0–0	1–2	0–2	0–1	2–3	3–2	0–2	2–2	0–3	1–1	3–2		2–2	0–3
Worksop Town	4–2	0–1	3–1	0–3	1–2	1–1	6–2	0–2	3–5	1–1	3–2	1–0	6–0	2–1	3–2	2–1	0–0		0–3
Yorkshire Amateur	2–0	1–3	0–4	0–3	0–0	0–1	7–0	2–0	1–2	2–0	0–0	1–0	2–1	2–1	2–1	2–5	2–0	1–2	

Source: NPL East Division results grid
Legend: Blue = home team win; Yellow = draw; Red = away team win.

=== Play-offs ===
Semifinals
2	Marske United	2
5	Shildon	1
3	Cleethorpes Town	1
4	Stockton Town	2

Final
2	Marske United	2
4	Stockton Town	1

Semi-finals

26 April	Marske United	2–1 (a.e.t.)	Shildon	Marske-by-the-Sea
19:45	Boyes 77'; Kennedy 111'	Report	Thexton 79'	Stadium: Mount Pleasant; Attendance: 855

26 April	Cleethorpes Town	1–2	Stockton Town	Grimsby
19:45	Middleton 26'	Report	Nicholson 15'; Hayes 21'	Stadium: Bradley Football Centre; Attendance: 828

Final

30 April	Marske United	2–1	Stockton Town	Marske-by-the-Sea
21:00	Smith 71'; Gott 89'	Report 1 Report 2	Portas 90'	Stadium: Mount Pleasant; Attendance: 1,500; Referee: Stuart Morland

=== Stadia and locations ===
Locations of Northern Premier League 2021–22 Division One East teams
Locations of Northern Premier League 2021–22 Premier Division teams (Yorkshire)

Team	Location	Stadium	Capacity
Bridlington Town	Bridlington	Queensgate	3,000
Brighouse Town	Brighouse	St Giles Road	1,000
Cleethorpes Town	Grimsby	Bradley Football Centre	1,000
Dunston	Dunston	Wellington Road	2,500
Frickley Athletic	South Elmsall	Westfield Lane	2,087
Hebburn Town	Hebburn	The Green Energy Sports Ground	–
Lincoln United	Lincoln	Ashby Avenue	2,200
Liversedge	Cleckheaton	Clayborn	2,000
Marske United	Marske-by-the-Sea	Mount Pleasant	2,500
Ossett United	Ossett	Ingfield	1,950
Pickering Town	Pickering	Mill Lane	2,000
Pontefract Collieries	Pontefract	Harratt Nissan Stadium	1,200
Sheffield	Dronfield	Coach and Horses Ground	2,089
Shildon	Shildon	Dean Street	4,700
Stocksbridge Park Steels	Stocksbridge	Bracken Moor	3,500
Stockton Town	Stockton	Bishopton Road West	1,800
Tadcaster Albion	Tadcaster	Ings Lane	2,000
Worksop Town	Worksop	Sandy Lane	2,500
Yorkshire Amateur	Leeds	Bracken Edge	1,550

== Division One Midlands ==
Northern Premier League Division One Midlands
- Season: 2021–22
- Champions: Ilkeston Town
- Promoted: Ilkeston Town; Belper United
- Relegated: Histon; Soham Town Rangers; Wisbech Town
- Matches: 380
- Goals: 1,255 (3.3 per match)
- Top goalscorer: 31 goal - Jonathon Margetts (Stamford; Belper Town)
- Total attendance: 128,877
- Average attendance: 339

As part of the realignment, the delayed formation of a third Northern Premier League First Division saw the creation of a new Midlands Division, in which it covers the Birmingham area, Nottinghamshire, western Northamptonshire and northern Cambridgeshire regions. The division consists of 20 sides for its inaugural season.

=== Team changes ===
The following 2 clubs were promoted from Step 5 divisions:

- Shepshed Dynamo – promoted from United Counties League
- Sporting Khalsa – promoted from Midland League

The following 9 clubs transferred from the NPL Division One South East:

- Belper Town
- Carlton Town
- Chasetown
- Ilkeston Town
- Loughborough Dynamo
- Stamford
- Sutton Coldfield Town
- Spalding United
- Wisbech Town

The following 9 clubs also transferred from other Step 4 Trident Alliance divisions:

- Bedworth United – transferred from Southern League Division Division One Central
- Cambridge City – transferred from Isthmian League North Division
- Coleshill Town – transferred from Southern League Division One Central
- Corby Town – transferred from Southern League Division One Central
- Daventry Town – transferred from Southern League Division One Central
- Halesowen Town – transferred from Southern League Division One Central
- Histon – transferred from Isthmian League North Division
- Soham Town Rangers – transferred from Isthmian League North Division
- Yaxley – transferred from Southern League Division One Central

=== League table ===
Pos	Team	Pld	W	D	L	GF	GA	GD	Pts	Promotion, qualification or relegation
1	Ilkeston Town (C, P)	38	27	6	5	97	42	+55	87	Promoted to the Southern League Premier Central
2	Stamford	38	26	6	6	95	36	+59	84	Qualified for the play-offs (Note: Four teams played for one spot and promotion to Level 7.)
3	Halesowen Town	38	25	8	5	92	39	+53	83	Qualified for the play-offs
4	Chasetown	38	25	7	6	79	38	+41	82	Qualified for the play-offs
5	Belper Town (O, P)	38	23	4	11	73	51	+22	73	Qualified for the play-offs
6	Carlton Town	38	19	11	8	71	48	+23	68	Transferred to Division One East
7	Coleshill Town	38	19	4	15	71	49	+22	61	
8	Sporting Khalsa	38	18	6	14	76	68	+8	60	
9	Cambridge City	38	15	9	14	60	58	+2	54	
10	Spalding United	38	15	8	15	47	56	−9	53	
11	Shepshed Dynamo	38	13	12	13	55	60	−5	51	
12	Bedworth United	38	13	8	17	47	59	−12	47	
13	Loughborough Dynamo	38	13	6	19	71	76	−5	45	
14	Yaxley	38	12	5	21	59	95	−36	41	
15	Corby Town	38	11	7	20	56	66	−10	40	
16	Daventry Town	38	10	9	19	50	80	−30	39	
17	Sutton Coldfield Town	38	9	10	19	42	62	−20	37	Reprieved from inter-step play-offs (Note: Ten of the 16 clubs at Step 4, all eight fourth-from-bottom placed teams and two sides placed third-from-bottom, one at the top and other in third place on a points per game (PPG) basis, were reprieved.)
18	Histon (R)	38	5	9	24	37	91	−54	24	Qualified for inter-step play-off (Note: Histon contested a one-off play-off match as one of the remaining six third-from-bottom teams with the fewest PPG against Consett, one of six runners-up from Step 5 that also had the fewest PPG at the end of the 2021–22 season.)
19	Soham Town Rangers (R)	38	5	6	27	42	91	−49	21	Relegated to the Eastern Counties League
20	Wisbech Town (R)	38	5	3	30	35	90	−55	18	Relegated to the United Counties League

Source: NPL official site
Rules for classification: 1) points; 2) goal difference; 3) number of goals scored; 4) number of matches won; 5) head-to-head results
(C) Champions; (O) Play-off winners; (P) Promoted; (R) Relegated

=== Top goalscorers ===
Rank	Player	Club	Goals
1	(England) Jonathon Margetts	Stamford; Belper Town (18)	31
2	(England) Jack Langston	Chasetown	27
3	(England) Kai Tonge	Coleshill Town	24
4	(England) Zak Goodson	Ilkeston Town	21
5	(England) Richard Gregory	Halesowen Town	20
5	(England) Remaye Campbell	Ilkeston Town	20
7	(England) Joey Butlin	Chasetown	19
8	(England) Kevin Bastos	Loughborough Dynamo	16
9	(England) Jack Bowen	Daventry Town	15
9	(England) Daniel Cotton	Yaxley	15
9	(England) Jack Duffy	Stamford	15
9	(Republic of Ireland) Kyle Finn	Halesowen Town	15

=== Results table ===
Home \ Away	BED	BEL	CAM	CAR	CHA	COL	COR	DAV	HAL	HIS	ILK	LOU	SHE	SOH	SPA	SPO	STA	SUT	WIS	YAX
Bedworth United		1–2	2–2	0–0	1–3	1–0	2–0	0–0	1–2	4–0	1–2	2–1	2–0	2–2	1–0	1–3	0–3	1–0	0–0	3–0
Belper Town	5–0		2–1	3–0	0–2	0–2	2–0	2–1	2–2	2–1	2–2	2–1	4–1	3–1	1–2	3–0	1–4	4–0	2–1	3–0
Cambridge City	0–1	1–1		2–3	1–3	3–4	2–4	3–1	1–2	4–2	1–2	3–1	3–3	1–1	2–1	1–1	1–2	0–0	1–0	2–1
Carlton Town	1–0	2–1	1–0		2–0	2–1	4–2	3–2	3–3	0–0	1–1	4–1	1–1	2–1	4–0	2–2	1–3	2–0	2–0	2–3
Chasetown	1–1	3–0	3–0	2–2		3–1	3–2	5–0	1–4	1–0	1–0	3–0	1–0	1–1	2–2	1–1	0–4	1–0	3–1	4–0
Coleshill Town	5–0	1–2	2–1	1–1	1–4		4–2	1–1	0–1	2–1	2–3	2–1	0–0	3–0	1–2	1–2	0–3	1–2	3–1	4–1
Corby Town	0–2	0–1	1–1	1–1	1–2	3–0		1–3	2–2	6–1	0–2	0–3	1–1	1–0	1–2	3–1	0–4	2–1	2–0	0–0
Daventry Town	3–2	1–3	0–4	0–2	2–2	1–1	3–2		1–6	1–1	0–4	2–2	0–5	1–2	2–1	3–1	0–2	2–0	0–2	3–0
Halesowen Town	3–0	2–1	2–0	2–2	0–2	0–2	3–0	2–1		3–0	0–1	4–1	5–1	2–1	0–1	4–0	3–2	1–1	2–0	5–0
Histon	2–2	1–1	0–1	2–0	0–1	0–4	0–5	2–4	0–1		0–0	3–2	2–2	2–4	1–1	0–1	2–2	1–1	1–5	0–2
Ilkeston Town	3–1	3–1	2–0	4–1	3–4	3–2	4–0	2–1	2–2	8–0		2–1	2–4	3–1	5–0	2–3	0–0	5–2	5–1	1–0
Loughborough Dynamo	1–2	1–2	0–2	2–2	0–2	1–4	2–1	2–0	1–1	3–4	1–5		5–0	2–2	3–2	6–2	0–2	3–3	2–0	6–1
Shepshed Dynamo	1–0	3–1	1–2	1–1	2–1	1–0	0–0	1–1	2–1	3–1	0–1	0–1		1–0	1–3	0–2	0–0	4–4	2–3	4–4
Soham Town Rangers	1–4	0–2	1–2	0–6	1–2	0–2	1–3	1–0	1–6	2–0	2–5	1–3	0–2		0–2	0–2	1–3	0–1	2–0	2–4
Spalding United	1–1	0–3	1–2	0–3	1–0	0–2	0–2	1–1	0–3	3–0	0–0	2–1	3–0	4–3		2–0	3–2	1–1	2–0	1–3
Sporting Khalsa	4–1	1–0	2–3	2–1	2–1	0–1	3–3	1–1	2–3	3–1	4–2	2–2	2–3	3–1	2–0		1–2	2–0	6–2	4–3
Stamford	4–1	6–1	2–2	3–0	1–3	3–1	1–0	5–1	2–2	1–0	1–3	3–1	2–0	2–2	1–0	4–3		6–0	5–0	1–2
Sutton Coldfield Town	1–0	0–2	0–1	0–1	0–0	0–1	2–2	1–3	1–2	0–2	1–2	1–2	2–0	2–0	1–1	2–1	1–0		3–0	3–0
Wisbech Town	0–2	3–4	2–3	0–3	0–4	0–4	2–1	3–4	0–1	1–2	1–2	2–3	1–4	3–0	0–0	0–3	0–1	2–2		2–1
Yaxley	3–2	1–2	1–1	1–3	1–4	0–5	0–3	2–0	1–5	5–2	0–1	1–3	1–1	4–4	3–1	3–2	0–3	4–3	3–0	

Source: NPL Midlands Division results grid
Legend: Blue = home team win; Yellow = draw; Red = away team win.

=== Play-off ===
Semifinals
2	Stamford	1
5	Belper Town	2
3	Halesowen Town	0
4	Chasetown	1

Final
5	Belper Town	1
4	Chasetown	0

Semi-finals

26 April	Stamford	1–2	Belper Town	Stamford
19:45	Matwasa 90+3'	Report	Litchfield 40'; Dixon 90'	Stadium: Borderville Sports Centre; Attendance: 984; Referee: Ben Cooke

26 April	Halesowen Town	0–1	Chasetown	Halesowen
19:45		Report	Langston 90+3' (pen.)	Stadium: The Grove; Attendance: 2,573

Final

30 April	Chasetown	0–1	Belper Town	Chasetown
15:00		Report	Bertram 49'	Stadium: The Scholars Ground; Attendance: 2,500; Referee: Shaun Taylor

=== Inter-step play-off ===
30 April	Histon	1–2	Consett	Impington
	Lindsay 73'		Heslop 44'; Marriott 52'	Stadium: Bridge Road; Attendance: 410

=== Stadia and locations ===
Locations of Northern Premier League 2021–22 Division One Midlands teams

Team	Location	Stadium	Capacity
Bedworth United	Bedworth	The Oval	3,000
Belper Town	Belper	Christchurch Meadow	2,650
Cambridge City	Impington	Bridge Road (groundshare with Histon)	4,300
Carlton Town	Carlton	Bill Stokeld Stadium	1,500
Chasetown	Burntwood	The Scholars Ground	2,000
Coleshill Town	Coleshill	Pack Meadow	2,000
Corby Town	Corby	Steel Park	3,893
Daventry Town	Daventry	Elderstubbs	1,855
Halesowen Town	Halesowen	The Grove	3,150
Histon	Impington	Bridge Road	4,300
Ilkeston Town	Ilkeston	New Manor Ground	3,029
Loughborough Dynamo	Loughborough	Nanpantan Sports Ground	1,500
Shepshed Dynamo	Shepshed	The Dovecote Stadium	2,500
Soham Town Rangers	Soham	Julius Martin Lane	2,000
Spalding United	Spalding	Sir Halley Stewart Field	3,500
Sporting Khalsa	Willenhall	Guardian Warehousing Arena	–
Stamford	Stamford	Borderville Sports Centre	2,000
Sutton Coldfield Town	Sutton Coldfield	Central Ground	2,000
Wisbech Town	Wisbech	Fenland Stadium	1,118
Yaxley	Yaxley	Leading Drove	1,000

== Division One West ==
Northern Premier League Division One West
- Season: 2021–22
- Champions: Warrington Rylands 1906
- Promoted: Warrington Rylands 1906; Marine
- Relegated: Kendal Town; Market Drayton
- Matches: 380
- Goals: 1,121 (2.95 per match)
- Top goalscorer: 25 goals - Ryan Brooke (Runcorn Linnets)
- Total attendance: 161,728
- Average attendance: 426

When the divisions were realigned this became Division One West instead of Division One North West from the previous season. Division One West comprised 20 teams.

=== Team changes ===
The following 3 clubs were promoted from the North West Counties League:

- 1874 Northwich
- Bootle
- Warrington Rylands 1906

The following 5 clubs transferred from Division One South East:

- Leek Town
- Newcastle Town
- Kidsgrove Athletic
- Glossop North End
- Market Drayton Town

=== League table ===
Pos	Team	Pld	W	D	L	GF	GA	GD	Pts	Promotion, qualification or relegation
1	Warrington Rylands 1906 (C, P)	38	26	7	5	95	38	+57	85	Promoted to the Premier Division
2	Workington	38	25	9	4	72	27	+45	84	Qualified for the play-offs (Note: Four teams played for one spot and promotion to Level 7.)
3	Leek Town	38	24	7	7	74	36	+38	79	Qualified for the play-offs
4	Runcorn Linnets	38	23	7	8	72	39	+33	76	Qualified for the play-offs
5	Marine (O, P)	38	24	5	9	63	40	+23	74 (Note: Marine were deducted 3 points for fielding an ineligible player.)	Qualified for the play-offs
6	Clitheroe	38	21	8	9	78	44	+34	71	
7	Bootle	38	20	2	16	78	65	+13	62	
8	Mossley	38	17	6	15	60	59	+1	57	
9	City of Liverpool	38	14	11	13	48	51	−3	53	
10	Kidsgrove Athletic	38	14	8	16	51	53	−2	50	
11	Trafford	38	13	10	15	56	55	+1	49	
12	1874 Northwich	38	13	8	17	59	58	+1	47	
13	Widnes	38	13	8	17	46	45	+1	47	
14	Colne	38	12	8	18	39	54	−15	44	
15	Ramsbottom United	38	12	6	20	47	62	−15	42	
16	Newcastle Town	38	10	10	18	49	64	−15	40	
17	Glossop North End	38	9	13	16	36	55	−19	40	Reprieved from inter-step play-offs (Note: Ten of the 16 clubs at Step 4, all eight fourth-from-bottom teams and two sides placed third-from-bottom, one at the top and the other in third place on a points per game (PPG) basis, were reprieved from contesting relegation play-offs.)
18	Prescot Cables	38	12	3	23	49	70	−21	39	Reprieved from inter-step play-offs
19	Kendal Town (R)	38	3	4	31	28	90	−62	12 (Note: Kendal Town were deducted one point for fielding an ineligible player.)	Relegated to the North West Counties League
20	Market Drayton Town (R)	38	2	6	30	21	116	−95	12	Relegated to the Midland League

Source: NPL official site
Rules for classification: 1) points; 2) goal difference; 3) number of goals scored; 4) number of matches won; 5) head-to-head results
(C) Champions; (O) Play-off winners; (P) Promoted; (R) Relegated

=== Top goalscorers ===
Rank	Player	Club	Goals
1	(England) Ryan Brooke	Runcorn Linnets	25
2	(England) Ben Hodkinson	Bootle	20
3	(England) Kane Drummond	Warrington Rylands	19
3	(England) Daniel Trickett-Smith	Leek Town	19
5	(England) Jamie Rainford	Glossop North End; Ramsbottom United (4)	18
6	(England) Max Cane	Clitheroe	16
7	(England) Timothy Grice	Leek Town	15
7	(England) Jack McGowan	Bootle	15
9	(England) Sefton Gonzales	Clitheroe	14
9	(England) Jack Hazlehurst	City of Liverpool	14
9	(England) David Symington	Workington	14

=== Results table ===
Home \ Away	18N	BOO	COL	CLI	CLN	GNE	KEN	KID	LEE	MAR	MKT	MOS	NEW	PRE	RAM	RUN	TRA	WAR	WID	WOR
1874 Northwich		0–5	2–2	2–2	1–2	0–1	4–1	0–3	0–3	0–2	1–0	7–3	1–1	0–1	1–0	1–2	3–0	0–1	0–3	2–4
Bootle	3–2		3–1	1–2	3–0	1–2	3–2	0–3	0–3	2–0	4–0	3–0	2–3	3–0	5–0	2–1	2–3	2–4	1–0	0–4
City of Liverpool	0–1	2–1		0–4	0–0	1–1	0–0	1–1	2–0	1–2	3–0	1–0	0–1	1–0	0–0	2–0	0–0	1–2	1–0	0–2
Clitheroe	2–2	7–1	6–0		5–1	2–0	3–1	1–2	0–2	2–0	4–0	3–2	2–0	4–1	3–2	1–2	1–0	2–2	2–1	0–2
Colne	0–4	0–2	4–0	1–1		2–0	0–1	1–0	0–1	1–1	0–0	0–1	0–1	0–2	1–0	1–1	1–0	0–2	2–0	0–3
Glossop North End	1–1	3–2	2–2	0–2	3–2		2–0	2–2	1–2	0–2	3–2	0–2	0–2	0–2	3–0	3–1	1–1	1–1	0–0	1–3
Kendal Town	0–0	2–4	0–1	1–2	0–2	0–0		0–4	1–3	0–2	2–1	1–2	0–2	4–3	1–2	0–3	1–5	0–2	0–0	1–3
Kidsgrove Athletic	1–3	1–2	2–1	2–0	1–1	3–0	4–2		2–3	0–0	1–0	1–3	4–0	1–2	0–0	0–1	0–2	1–0	1–0	0–1
Leek Town	1–2	3–1	2–2	5–0	2–0	2–1	3–0	0–0		3–2	5–1	4–0	1–1	1–1	2–1	0–1	2–2	3–0	2–1	0–0
Marine	1–0	0–3	2–1	0–2	1–0	2–1	4–1	3–0	1–3		3–1	0–3	3–2	3–1	3–1	3–1	2–1	0–2	0–0	2–1
Market Drayton Town	0–1	0–3	1–3	1–1	0–5	0–0	2–1	1–4	0–1	0–1		1–7	1–1	1–0	2–2	0–2	0–4	1–3	0–5	1–1
Mossley	1–0	2–1	1–2	0–0	0–2	0–0	2–1	3–3	3–2	1–1	1–0		2–2	4–1	0–3	0–2	3–1	0–3	1–1	0–1
Newcastle Town	0–1	0–2	1–3	0–1	5–1	0–0	1–0	1–0	2–3	1–3	6–1	1–2		2–1	1–1	1–2	2–2	1–2	3–4	1–1
Prescot Cables	1–2	2–1	0–6	2–3	0–4	0–2	1–0	3–0	0–1	0–1	7–0	3–1	2–1		2–1	0–1	4–2	3–3	0–1	0–0
Ramsbottom United	2–0	2–3	1–0	3–0	3–1	0–0	2–0	3–2	0–2	0–3	7–1	1–2	4–0	1–0		1–3	1–1	0–1	3–2	0–1
Runcorn Linnets	1–0	3–1	3–3	0–0	0–0	1–1	7–0	4–0	2–0	1–1	4–1	0–4	2–0	2–1	4–0		1–1	2–0	2–0	1–2
Trafford	2–5	1–2	0–1	0–5	1–1	1–0	4–2	0–1	2–1	0–2	3–0	2–1	1–1	3–0	2–0	2–0		0–0	3–0	2–2
Warrington Rylands 1906	3–1	2–2	2–3	2–2	6–0	4–0	2–1	3–0	2–0	1–4	7–0	2–1	5–2	7–2	8–0	2–0	4–1		1–0	2–1
Widnes	1–1	3–0	1–1	2–1	1–3	2–0	3–1	1–1	1–2	2–3	2–0	1–2	0–0	2–1	1–0	3–5	1–0	0–1		0–1
Workington	2–2	2–2	3–0	1–0	2–0	5–1	2–0	5–0	1–1	1–0	2–1	2–0	4–0	1–0	1–0	2–4	2–1	1–1	0–1	

Source: NPL West Division results grid
Legend: Blue = home team win; Yellow = draw; Red = away team win.

=== Play-offs ===
Semifinals
2	Workington	2
5	Marine	3
3	Leek Town	1
4	Runcorn Linnets	4

Final
5	Marine	2
4	Runcorn Linnets	1

Semi-finals

26 April	Workington	2–3 (a.e.t.)	Marine	Workington
	Scott Allison 6'; Sam Smith 58'	Report	Neil Kengni 21', 90', 93'	Stadium: Borough Park; Attendance: 1,326

26 April	Leek Town	1–4	Runcorn Linnets	Leek
	Timothy Grice 65'	Report	Iwan Murray 1', 4'; Thomas Marsh-Hughes 3'; Ryan Brooke 79'	Stadium: Harrison Park; Attendance: 1,381

Final

30 April	Runcorn Linnets	1–2	Marine	Runcorn, Cheshire
15:00	Ryan Brooke 3'	Report	Neil Kengni 71'; Jack Dunn 79'	Stadium: APEC Taxis Stadium; Attendance: 1,600

=== Stadia and locations ===
Locations of Northern Premier League 2021–22 Division One West teams

Team	Location	Stadium	Capacity
1874 Northwich	Barnton	The Offside Trust Stadium (groundshare with Barnton)	3,000
Bootle	Bootle	New Bucks Park	3,750
City of Liverpool	Ellesmere Port	Rivacre Park (groundshare with Vauxhall Motors)	3,300
Clitheroe	Clitheroe	Shawbridge	2,000
Colne	Colne	Holt House	1,800
Glossop North End	Glossop	The Amdec Forklift Stadium	1,301
Kendal Town	Kendal	Parkside Road	2,400
Kidsgrove Athletic	Kidsgrove	The Autonet Insurance Stadium	2,000
Leek Town	Leek	Harrison Park	3,600
Marine	Crosby	Rossett Park	3,185
Market Drayton Town	Market Drayton	Greenfields Sports Ground	1,000
Mossley	Mossley	Seel Park	4,000
Newcastle Town	Newcastle-under-Lyme	Lyme Valley Stadium	4,000
Prescot Cables	Prescot	IP Truck Parts Stadium	3,200
Ramsbottom United	Ramsbottom	The Harry Williams Riverside	2,000
Runcorn Linnets	Runcorn	APEC Taxis Stadium	1,600
Trafford	Flixton	Shawe lane	2,500
Warrington Rylands 1906	Warrington	Gorsey Lane	1,345
Widnes	Widnes	Halton Stadium	13,350
Workington	Workington	Borough Park	3,101

== Relegation reprieves ==
=== Step 3 ===
Seven clubs at Step 3, all four fourth-from-bottom teams and those placed third-from-bottom that are the top three on a points per game (PPG) basis, were reprieved from relegation. The remaining team was relegated to Step 4.

The final points-per-game ranking of the third-from-bottom placed teams in Step 3 divisions was as follows:

Pos	Team	League	Pld	Pts	PPG	Qualification
5	Basford United	Northern Premier League Premier Division	42	45	1.071	Retention at Step 3
6	Barwell	Southern League Premier Division Central	40	41	1.025	Retention at Step 3
7	Kings Langley	Southern League Premier Division South	42	37	0.881	Retention at Step 3
8	Leatherhead	Isthmian League Premier Division	42	36	0.857	Relegation to Step 4

=== Step 4 ===
Ten of the 16 clubs at Step 4, all eight fourth-from-bottom teams and two sides placed third-from-bottom, one at the top and the other in third place on a points per game (PPG) basis, were reprieved from contesting relegation play-offs. The FA granted third-placed Sheffield a reprieve after Yorkshire Amateur's demotion. The remaining six teams contested one-off matches with six runners-up from Step 5 that had the fewest PPG at the end of the 2021–22 season. Three winners of their matches stayed at Step 4 for the 2022–23 season, while three others lost theirs and were relegated to Step 5.

The final points-per-game ranking of the 3rd-from-bottom-placed teams in Step 4 divisions was also as follows:

Pos	Team	League	Pld	Pts	PPG	Qualification
9	Prescot Cables	Northern Premier League Division One West	38	39	1.026	Retention at Step 4
10	Lancing	Isthmian League South East Division	38	36	0.947	Relegation match with a Step 5 team
11	Sheffield	Northern Premier League Division One East	36	33	0.917	Retention at Step 4
12	Witham Town	Isthmian League North Division	38	33	0.863	Relegation match with a Step 5 team
13	Cinderford Town	Southern League Division One South	36	31	0.861	Relegation match with a Step 5 team
14	Kempston Rovers	Southern League Division One Central	38	29	0.763	Relegation match with a Step 5 team
15	Histon	Northern Premier League Division One Midlands	38	24	0.632	Relegation match with a Step 5 team
16	Chalfont St Peter	Isthmian League South Central Division	36	21	0.583	Relegation match with a Step 5 team

== Challenge Cup ==
For the second successive season, it was announced to member clubs that the League Challenge Cup was cancelled due to any further fixture disruptions that might have occurred during the COVID-19 pandemic.

== See also ==
- Northern Premier League
- 2021–22 Isthmian League
- 2021–22 Southern League
