= Steve Dunwell =

American photographer

Steve Dunwell teaching a photography workshop in Boston, 2009

Steve Dunwell is an American photographer noted for his color photographs of urban and scenic landscapes.

== Early life and education ==
Boston photographer Steve Dunwell has traveled the world shooting for corporations and magazines and eventually settled in Beantown, “The Athens of America” and, after having his New England photos serve as the basis for many publishers’ coffee-table books, up and started his own publishing company himself. Plus, he got to study under the legendary Walker Evans, which is a story in itself.

“I’m very interested in the environments that people create,” Dunwell says, “and the way they inhabit them. I concentrate on themes involving what people build, including architectural landscape, industrial history and aerial photography. I’m also interested in portraiture and interpreting people in the environment they inhabit.”

Born in New Rochelle, N.Y., and raised further upstate in Poughkeepsie, Dunwell attended the Quaker academy Oakwood Friends School there. His father had worked for IBM, and in their retirement helped administer a community arts programs at the town’s Bardavon Opera House, a venerable Hudson Valley performance venue and cultural institution dating to 1869. He became interested in photography when he got to Yale – albeit as a science major. “I was extremely fortunate to get an on-campus job working in the darkroom that supplied photographic services to the science department,” Dunwell recalls “Thom Brown, the guy who ran it, was a protégé of [the Guggenheim Fellow landscape photographer] Paul Caponigro. I learned tremendous technical background in that situation.”

It was also that Yale that he studied with Walker Evans, whose photographs of the Great Depression have become iconic American images. Evans was appointed a professor of photography in the graphic-design department of the Yale School of Art and Architecture. Steve studied photojournalism with Walker Evans at Yale University.

== Photography career ==
Steve Dunwell makes photographs of New England – its people, landscape, and industry – for publications, for collectors, and for advertising. Many of his photographs are featured in a series of fourteen picture books on regional subjects, including Extraordinary Boston.

He also works on corporate and editorial assignments, concentrating on industrial environments, architecture, aerials, and portraiture. He has traveled to over 40 nations on 5 continents. His stock photos are represented in several libraries and agencies. Editorial clients include Yankee Magazine, American Style, GEO, American Heritage, Black Enterprise, Preservation Magazine, and National Geographic Traveler.

Steve Dunwell created Back Bay Press in 1994. Back Bay Press specializes in photographic studies of New England subjects. Their most recent title is Boston Freedom Trail, describing the city's foremost historical venue.

As a supplier of Boston-themed images, Steve continues to make new images of his city, extending and improving his collection. Panoramic and aerial images are a key part of this archive, along with cultural activities.

Steve Dunwell lives and has his studio in the Bay Village neighborhood of Boston. He has been an instructor at New England School of Photography and now teaches workshops at Panasonic Digital Photography Academy. His photographs are included in numerous corporate and private collections.

== Books ==
- Rhode Island: A Scenic Discovery (Foremost Publishers, 1976), ISBN 978-0-940078-03-1
- The Run of the Mill (Godine Press, 1978),ISBN 978-0-87923-249-8
- Connecticut: A Scenic Discovery (Foremost Publishers, 1980), ISBN 978-0-89909-050-4
- Vision in Steel (AMCA International, 1982)
- Duke University: A Portrait (Fort Church Press, 1983), ISBN 978-0-917585-00-5
- Mystic Seaport (Foremost Publishers, 1984), ISBN 978-0-939510-13-9
- Long Island: A Scenic Discovery (Foremost Publishers, 1985), ISBN 978-0-89909-083-2
- Boston University: Pictorial (Boston University Press, 1989), ISBN 978-0-87270-064-2
- Yale: A Portrait (Fort Church Press, 1990), ISBN 978-7-85665-510-3
- USS Constitution: Old Ironsides (Fort Church Press, 1991), ISBN 978-1-884824-04-3
- Boston Freedom Trail (Back Bay Press, 1996, revised 2004), ISBN 978-0-9643015-2-8
- Harvard: A Living Portrait (Back Bay Press, revised 2007), ISBN 978-0-9643015-1-1
- Extraordinary Boston (Back Bay Press, revised 2007), ISBN 978-0-9643015-0-4
- Massachusetts: A Scenic Discovery (Back Bay Press, revised 2008) ISBN 978-0899090511

== See also ==
- Aerial photography
- Portrait photography
