= Richard Dunwell =

English footballer (born 1971)

Personal information
- Full name: Richard Kirk Dunwell
- Date of birth: 17 June 1971 (age 55)
- Place of birth: Islington, England
- Height: 1.78 m (5 ft 10 in)
- Position: Forward

Youth career
- –1989: Millwall

Senior career*
Years	Team	Apps	(Gls)
1989–1990	Millwall	0	(0)
1990–1991	Aldershot	1	(0)
- Collier Row
1995–1997	Barnet	14	(1)
1996	→ Walton & Hersham (loan)		
1996	→ Cheltenham Town (loan)		
1998-2000	Enfield		
2000-2001	Billericay Town	13	(4)
2001	Hemel Hempstead Town	1	(0)
- Dagenham & Redbridge
- Gravesend & Northfleet
- * Club domestic league appearances and goals

Richard Kirk Dunwell (born 17 June 1971 in Islington, England), is an English footballer who played as a forward. He played in the Football League for Millwall, Aldershot, Barnet.
