= 2018–19 Wearside Football League =

Wearside Football League
- Season: 2018–19

The 2018–19 Wearside Football League season is the 127th in the history of Wearside Football League and the first season that the Durham & Wearside Development Division is part of the system.

== Wearside Football League ==
The 2018–19 season consists of 16 clubs from South Tyneside, Gateshead, Sunderland, County Durham, Teesside, Cumbria and North Yorkshire.

The following 4 clubs left the Wearside League before the season -

- Redcar - promoted to Northern League Division Two
- Cleator Moor Celtic - promoted to North West Counties Football League Division One North
- Stokesley Sports Club - resigned
- Prudhoe Town - resigned
- South Shields Res - resigned

The following 3 clubs joined the Wearside League before the season -

- Darlington RA - relegated from Northern League Division Two
- Hordon Colliery Welfare - promoted from Durham Alliance League
- West Auckland Tuns - promoted from Durham Alliance League

Pos	Team	Pld	W	D	L	GF	GA	GD	Pts	Promotion, qualification or relegation
1	Wolviston	19	17	1	1	82	25	+57	52	Promotion to Northern League
2	Hebburn Town Res	17	15	2	0	51	11	+40	47	
3	Sunderland West End	20	15	1	4	72	31	+41	46	
4	Harton and Westoe CW	19	13	3	3	63	25	+38	42	
5	Richmond Town	19	12	1	6	47	25	+22	37	
6	Silksworth CW	19	10	3	6	46	34	+12	33	
7	Hartlepool	18	10	2	6	52	26	+26	32	
8	Hordon CW	18	10	0	8	47	32	+15	30	
9	Windscale	20	7	1	12	37	56	−19	22	
10	West Auckland Tuns	18	4	5	9	28	59	−31	17	
11	Darlington RA	16	5	1	10	28	46	−18	16	
12	Annfield Plain	18	5	1	12	29	50	−21	16	
13	Gateshead Leam Rangers	17	4	2	11	38	54	−16	14	
14	Boldon CA	21	4	2	15	30	65	−35	14	
15	Darlington Town	15	1	1	13	21	45	−24	4	
16	Coxhoe Athletic	18	0	2	16	20	107	−87	2	Relegation to Durham & Wearside Development League

Updated to match(es) played on 3 January 2019. Source: Wearside Football League table
Rules for classification: 1) Points; 2) Goal difference; 3) Number of goals scored; 4) Number of matches won; 5) Head-to-head results

== Durham & Wearside Development Division ==
Newly created division which will act as a feeder to the Wearside League. Many of the teams in the league moved from the Durham Alliance Combination League when it was closed in 2018.

Pos	Team	Pld	W	D	L	GF	GA	GD	Pts	Promotion, qualification or relegation
1	Sunderland Town End FC	10	9	1	0	122	16	+106	28	Promotion to Wearside League
2	Wheatley Hill WMC FC	7	6	0	1	37	6	+31	18	
3	Durham United FC	7	6	0	1	36	10	+26	18	
4	Seaton Carew FC	9	5	1	3	23	18	+5	16	
5	Farringdon Detached FC	9	4	0	5	26	41	−15	12	
6	Hylton Sports Club FC	11	3	1	7	28	56	−28	10	
7	Washington AFC Reserves	7	2	3	2	29	19	+10	9	
8	Durham City Reserves FC	9	1	2	6	20	28	−8	5	
9	Jarrow FC Reserves	11	0	0	11	17	144	−127	0	Relegation

Updated to match(es) played on 3 January 2019. Source: Wearside Football League table
Rules for classification: 1) Points; 2) Goal difference; 3) Number of goals scored; 4) Number of matches won; 5) Head-to-head results
