= Thatcham Town F.C. =

Association football club in England

Thatcham Town
- Full name: Thatcham Town Football Club
- Nicknames: The Kingfishers, Blues
- Founded: 1894
- Ground: Waterside Park, Thatcham
- Chairman: Phil Holdway
- Manager: Cameron Philbey
- League: Combined Counties League Premier Division North
- 2025–26: Combined Counties League Premier Division South, 15th of 20 (transferred)
- Website: www.thatchamtownfootball.club
Home colours	Away colours

Thatcham Town Football Club is a semi-professional English football club based in Thatcham, Berkshire. They are currently members of the Combined Counties League Premier Division North and play at Waterside Park. The club is affiliated to the Berks & Bucks Football Association.

== History ==
Thatcham Town Football Club was founded in 1894 and played friendly matches only for the first two years at "The Marsh", now known as Dunston Green. The club was known as Thatcham at this time and added "Town" to its name later in 1974. The club joined the Reading Temperance League in 1896 where it remained for the next fifty-seven years, winning Division Two in 1905–06. During this period, Thatcham also won the Reading Town Senior Cup, the Berks & Bucks Junior Cup in 1935–36 and was runner-up in the Reading & District Premier League.

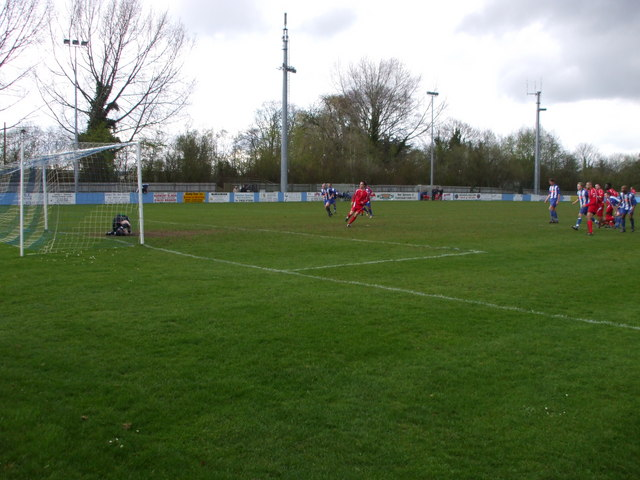
Game against Bracknell Town at Waterside Park in 2008

In 1949, the club purchased eleven acres of land off Northfield Road. This became known as Lancaster Close. Early in 1970, seven acres were sold and the proceeds used to finance the construction of a new clubhouse and dressing rooms. In 1953, Thatcham became a founder member of the Hellenic League and was promoted to the Premier Division on three occasions as Division one champions in 1958–59, 1964–65 and 1972–73. In 1974, the club changed its name from Thatcham. In the 1974–75 season the club won the Hellenic League Championship and the Premier Division Cup; in addition Thatcham also reached the final of the Berks & Bucks Senior Cup losing to Wycombe Wanderers. However, Thatcham was awarded the Cup by default because of a dispute between Wanderers and the Berks & Bucks FA.

In 1983, floodlights were erected and were first used when Thatcham entertained Fulham at Lancaster Close in January that year. After a short stay in the Athenian League, the club spent two seasons in the London Spartan League before joining the newly formed Wessex League in 1986. In the 1988–89 season, Thatcham reached the quarter-finals of the FA Vase, losing 2–0 away at local rivals Hungerford Town.

To provide improved facilities, the club moved to a new ten-acre site at Waterside Park during the 1992–93 season and a record gate for the new stadium was set when 1,400 spectators saw Thatcham lose by a single goal to Aldershot Town, the newly reformed phoenix club of former Football League team Aldershot, in the first round of the 1993–94 FA Vase.

Under the management of Jim Greenwood, in 1994–95, the club set a Wessex League and club record when they went thirty-three league games unbeaten and won the Wessex League Cup beating Fleet Town in the final. The following season, in 1995–96, Jim Greenwood led Thatcham to the league title. The following season saw the club's best ever FA Cup run, reaching the Fourth Qualifying Round after away victories against Southern League Premier Gloucester City and Bashley, of the Southern League South. Thatcham eventually succame to Isthmian League side Boreham Wood. In 1997, the club reached the Final of the Wessex League Cup for the sixth time in eight years, winning the Cup for the fourth time.

In 2002–03, Thatcham was awarded the FA Community Standard Charter, the first club at this level in Southern England to earn this award. Two seasons later, under new manager Jason Braidwood, the club reached three local cup finals, winning two of them, and finished third in the League. In the 2005–06 season, the club went one better and was runner-up to Winchester City and, with the club meeting FA ground-grading requirements, it joined the Southern League in Division One South & West. In the 2008–09 season, his first full season in charge, manager Gary Ackling guided the club to winning the Basingstoke Senior Cup.

In June 2010, Thatcham appointed Colin Millard as manager. With over half of the squad departed, many to its local rival Hungerford Town, and a reduction in the club's playing budget, Millard had the difficult task of rebuilding the squad for the 2010–11 season. Millard left the club in October 2010, and Ackling returned to manage the club. In April 2011, Thatcham Town beat Tadley Calleva 4–1 to win The Basingstoke Senior Cup Final. This was played at the ground at Andover New Street. Thatcham won the competition again at the end of the 2011–12 season, beating Basingstoke New Inn 3–0 in the final.

At the end of the 2013–14 season, Thatcham resigned from the Southern Football League after eight seasons in the league. The club were placed in the Hellenic Football League Premier Division, a step below their previous division on the National League System ladder, by the FA Leagues Committee.

The 2017–18 season saw Thatcham win the FA Vase, beating the club's previous best performance in the competition. On 21 October, they started in the first round of the competition defeating Horsham YMCA 2–1 at Waterside Park, before an 8–2 victory over Broadbridge Heath in the next round on 11 November. The third round saw Sevenoaks Town fall 3–1 on 2 December, while, on 6 January, Biggleswade were dispatched 2–1 in the fourth round. A 2–1 victory against Bromsgrove Sporting on 3 February saw the club reach the quarter-finals, equalling the club's record performance in the competition set in 1989. On 24 February, a 1–0 victory away at Melksham Town put the Kingfishers into the semi-finals. On 17 March, they beat 1874 Northwich in the first leg of the semi-final 1–0, following a fourth-minute penalty from Ross Cook in front of 1,134 at Waterside Park. The Kingfishers won the second leg 3–2, with a brace from Gavin James and a goal from Shane Cooper-Clark, to give them a 4–2 aggregate victory and a place in the final at Wembley Stadium. In the same season, Thatcham won the Hellenic Premier Division by +2 goal difference to earn promotion to the Southern League Division One.

On 10 May 2020, manager Danny Robinson resigned from his post and was replaced by Jamie Leacock. During his first season (2020–21) which was curtailed after playing just 8 matches the team ended with 6 points.

Experiencing a new league or the 2021–22 season, Thatcham Town now play in the Isthmian League Division One South Central. On 27 February 2022 after a series of defeats and with Town in 14th place with 25 points from 27 games, he left the club by mutual consent.

Assistant Manager, Yash Romeo, took on First Team Management duties. Shaun Allaway and Colin Charles continue to be part of the team and are joined by Sam Loades who comes in as First Team Coach.

=== Seasons ===
Season	Position	Teams	P	W	D	L	F	A	Pts
1974-75 HELL-P	1	17	32	22	4	6	49	24	70
1975-76 HELL-P	9	16	30	12	7	11	36	45	43
1976-77 HELL-P	14	16	30	7	8	15	33	62	29
1977-78 HELL-P	15	16	30	3	7	20	20	73	16
1978-79 HELL-1	8	18	34	15	7	12	67	56	37
1979-80 HELL-1	9	16	30	12	6	12	49	55	30
1980-81 HELL-1	8	16	30	11	12	7	48	41	34
1981-82 HELL-1	11	16	30	11	6	13	54	53	28
1982-83 ATHEN	18	20	38	8	6	24	30	85	22
1983-84 ATHEN	17*	21	40	8	14	18	65	79	35
1984-85 LON S-P	4	17	32	15	8	9	54	34	38
1985-86 LON S-P	4	16	30	18	5	7	67	36	41
1986-87 WESSEX	6	17	32	15	6	11	53	33	5
1987-88 WESSEX	11	19	36	14	7	15	50	53	49
1988-89 WESSEX	4	17	32	17	7	8	60	26	58
1989-90 WESSEX	7	19	36	15	12	9	56	45	57
1990-91 WESSEX	6	20	38	19	11	8	68	32	68
1991-92 WESSEX	3	19	36	22	4	10	85	45	70
1992-93 WESSEX	4	21	40	24	10	6	104	45	82
1993-94 WESSEX	4	22	42	25	7	10	96	51	82
1994-95 WESSEX	3	22	42	29	9	4	104	44	96
1995-96 WESSEX	1	21	40	28	8	4	73	27	92
1996-97 WESSEX	3*	21	40	26	5	9	91	45	79
1997-98 WESSEX	10	20	38	16	6	16	64	54	54
1998-99 WESSEX	2	20	38	23	9	6	92	46	78
1999-00 WESSEX	13	21	40	15	7	18	62	69	52
2000-01 WESSEX	6	23	44	24	9	11	81	58	81
2001-02 WESSEX	12	23	44	19	8	17	94	77	65
2002-03 WESSEX	9	22	42	18	13	11	68	58	67
2003-04 WESSEX	10	22	42	16	10	16	70	72	58
2004-05 WESSEX-1	3	22	42	24	13	5	95	51	85
2005-06 WESSEX-1	2	22	42	29	7	6	92	37	94
2006-07 SOUTH-1SW	6	22	42	21	7	14	70	60	70
2007-08 SOUTH-1SW	15	22	42	13	10	19	59	62	49
2008-09 SOUTH-1SW	6	22	42	20	8	14	74	58	68
2009-10 SOUTH-1SW	12	22	42	17	6	19	76	72	57
2010-11 SOUTH-1SW	5	21	40	20	7	13	70	43	27
2011-12 SOUTH-1SW	8	21	40	16	14	10	51	42	62
2012-13 SOUTH-1SW	17	22	42	10	5	27	59	86	35
2013-14 SOUTH-1SW	19	22	42	11	6	25	41	99	58
2014-15 HELLENIC PREM	12	20	38	14	5	19	60	65	47
2015-16 HELLENIC PREM	2	20	38	28	6	4	101	45	90
2016-17 HELLENIC PREM	4	20	38	34	21	5	90	48	68
2017-18 HELLENIC PREM	1	20	38	31	5	2	129	25	98
2018-19 SOUTH-1S	11	20	38	17	5	16	57	58	56
2019-20 SOUTH 1S *	1*	20	27	18	4	5	66	28	58
2020-21 SOUTH 1S *	15	20	8	1	3	4	8	13	6
2021-22 SOUTH 1S	12	20	36	10	8	18	48	65	38
2022-23 SOUTH 1S		20							

- 2019-20 and 2020-21 Season null and void due to COVID-19 pandemic

== Ground ==
Stacatruc Stadium (also known as Waterside Park)
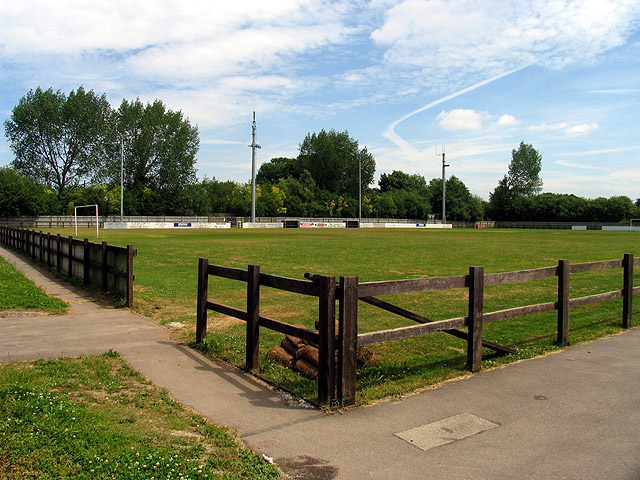
- The club's ground Stacatruc Stadium
- Interactive map of Stacatruc Stadium (also known as Waterside Park)
- Full name: Stacatruc Stadium, Waterside Park
- Location: Crookham Hill, Thatcham, Berkshire, RG19 4PA
- Coordinates: 51°23′29″N 1°14′33″W
- Capacity: 1,500
- Record attendance: 1,400 vs Aldershot Town (1993–94)
- Public transit: Thatcham

Construction
- Opened: 1992

Tenant
- Thatcham Town F.C. (1992–present)

Thatcham Town plays its home games at Waterside Park. The ground is located 300 metres (330 yd) south of Thatcham railway station and 250 metres (270 yd) south of the Kennet and Avon Canal and River Kennet; its location next to the two bodies of water gives the ground its name. Waterside Park is additionally 1.9 kilometres (1.2 mi) south of Thatcham town centre.

Waterside Park has a covered-seated stand at the southern side of the pitch, containing around three hundred seats, which hosts the club's offices and changing rooms. The stand is in a central position, running approximately half the length of the pitch. Amenities, such as toilets and catering, are located to the west of the main stand; the dugouts are located opposite. Supporters can stand anywhere around the pitch, with advertising boards and wooden fencing separating spectators from the pitch. The standing areas are uncovered and flat – not terraced – although a path has been tarmacked next to the barriers with grassed areas behind. The ground can be accessed through one of four turnstiles located at the south-western corner, two giving access from the west and two from the south; this enables the ground to be segregated should it be deemed necessary. Behind the main stand, there is a field which the club uses for training and other events.

The club previously played their home matches at The Marsh in Dunston Green, Brownsfield - the home of the local cricket club - and Station Road. The club moved to the current 10-acre (40,000 m^{2}) site at Waterside Park in 1992. The record attendance at the current home is 1,400 for the visit of Aldershot Town in the FA Vase in the 1993–94 season.

=== Support ===
During the first half of the 2021–22 season, Thatcham Town have averaged 161 supporters for their league home matches, with the highest league attendance being 451 against Basingstoke.

== Current squad ==
As of 24th September 2025

Note: Flags indicate national team as defined under FIFA eligibility rules; some limited exceptions apply. Players may hold more than one non-FIFA nationality.

No.	Pos.	Nation	Player
—	GK		Sam Jones
—	GK		Adam Smith
—	GK		Maciej Wieczorek
—	GK		William Wyatt
—	DF		Jamie Barker
—	DF		Luke Bishop
—	DF		Kai Boylan
—	DF		Kaser Shahid Chowdhary
—	DF		Prince da Cruz
—	DF		Edmundo Junior Fernandes Da Cruz Coquenao
—	DF		Archie Denton
—	DF		William David Edwards
—	DF		Joseph Hopkins
—	DF		Oscar Mcclure
—	DF		Finley Meikle
—	DF		Aaron Voller
—	DF		Callum Winchcombe
—	MF		Rowan Clark
—	MF		Amadou Diallo
—	MF		Louis Hutchings
—	MF		Mohammed Khamis
—	MF		Harvey Nash
—	MF		Luke Polding
—	MF		Daniel Smith
—	MF		Callum Mark Willmoth
—	FW		Pharrel Agbotey
—	FW		Oliver Denner
—	FW		Archie Goode
—	FW		David McDonagh
—	FW		Daniel Santos
—	FW		Nasser Southgate
—	FW		William Stantiford
—	FW		Fernando Tankaria-Rodriguez

== Former players ==
Lawrie Sanchez is one of the better known players to have played for Thatcham. Sanchez was born in London to a Northern Irish mother and an Ecuadorian father; when it came to selecting which country to represent at international level in his playing career, he chose Northern Ireland. He played for Thatcham three times before moving on to Reading; he later won the FA Cup with Wimbledon - scoring the winning goal in the final. The former Burnley, Queens Park Rangers and Southampton striker Charlie Austin used to play for Thatcham; he is currently playing for Queens Park Rangers as well as being a presenter on TalkSport Radio.

=== Professional players ===
Players who have played for Thatcham and who have played or managed in the Football League or a foreign equivalent to this level (i.e. fully professional league) are:

- (England) Charlie Austin (2008)
- (Sweden) Doug Bergqvist (2010–11)
- (England) Harry Grant (2017–2018 & 2021–2022)
- (England) Graham Lewis (2010–11)
- (Northern Ireland) Lawrie Sanchez (>1978)
- (England) Joe Tillen (2007–08)

=== International players ===
Players who have played for Thatcham and have played or managed at full international level are:

- (Saint Vincent and the Grenadines) Gavin James (2017–2018)
- (Northern Ireland) Lawrie Sanchez (>1978)

== Honours ==
- Wessex Football League:
  - Winners: 1995–96 (1)
  - Runners-up: 1998–99, 2005–06
- Hellenic Football League Premier Division :
  - Winners: 1974–75, 2017-18 (2)
- Hellenic Football League Division One:
  - Winners: 1958–59, 1964–65, 1972–73 (3)
- Reading Temperance League Division Two:
  - Winners: 1905–06 (1)
- Berks and Bucks Senior Cup:
  - Winners: 1974–75 (1)
- Berks and Bucks Senior Trophy:
  - Winners: 2004–05
- Wessex League Cup:
  - Winners: 1990–91, 1991–92, 1994–95, 1996–97
- Basingstoke Senior Cup:
  - Winners: 2008–09, 2010–11, 2011–12
- Berks and Bucks Junior Cup:
  - Winners: 1935–36
- FA Vase
  - Winners: 2017–18

== Records ==
- Best league performance: 5th in Southern League Division One South & West (Level 8), 2010–11
- Best FA Cup performance: 4th Qualifying Round, 1996–97
- Best FA Trophy performance: 2nd Qualifying Round, 2008–09
- Best FA Vase performance: Winners, 2017–18
- Highest attendance: 1,400 vs Aldershot Town 1993–94
