= Jason Ainsley =

English footballer and manager

Personal information
- Date of birth: 30 July 1970 (age 56)
- Place of birth: Stockton-on-Tees, England
- Position: Midfielder

Team information
- Current team: Spennymoor Town (head of football)

Senior career*
Years	Team	Apps	(Gls)
- Guisborough Town
- Spennymoor United
- Bishop Auckland
- Spennymoor United
1994–1995	Hartlepool United	15	(1)
- Inglewood Kiev
- Spennymoor United
- Blyth Spartans
1999	Jurong FC		
- Gateshead
- Balestier Khalsa
- Barrow
- Bishop Auckland
- Spennymoor United
- Durham City
- Spennymoor United

Managerial career
- 2006–2020: Spennymoor Town
- 2022–2023: Spennymoor Town
- 2026: Spennymoor Town (caretaker)
- * Club domestic league appearances and goals

Jason Ainsley (born 30 July 1970) is an English football manager and former player who is Head of Football of Spennymoor Town F.C., which compete in the National League North, in the English football league system.

== Playing career ==
Ainsley signed for Football League Third Division side Hartlepool United from Spennymoor in June 1994. In October 1994, Ainsley scored his only professional goal for Hartlepool in a 3–1 victory against Preston. After leaving Hartlepool, Ainsley played for several English non-league sides as well as for clubs in Australia and Singapore.

== Coaching career ==
In 2006, Ainsley was appointed as manager of Northern League Division Two (the tenth tier of English football) side Spennymoor. Ainsley was manager of National League North club Spennymoor Town from 2006 until 2020. Ainsley was the longest-serving manager in the top seven divisions of English football when he left Spennymoor in 2020. Ainsley won 11 trophies whilst at Spennymoor in more than 770 matches. Ainsley guided Spennymoor to the National League North (6th tier), the highest division in their history.

In October 2022, Ainsley returned to Spennymoor Town as manager until the end of the 2022–23 season. Having missed out on the play-offs on the final day of the season, he returned to his role of Head of Football in May 2023.

== Personal life ==
Ainsley is also a teacher and head of year at Mortimer Community College.

== Honours ==
=== Manager ===
Spennymoor Town

- Northern League Division One: 2009–10, 2010–11, 2011–12, 2013–14; runner-up: 2012–13
- Northern League Division Two: 2006–07
- FA Vase: 2012–13
