= 2010–11 Northern Football League =

The 2010–11 Northern Football League season was the 113th in the history of Northern Football League, a football competition in England.

== Division One ==
Northern Football League Division One
- Season: 2010–11
- Champions: Spennymoor Town
- Relegated: Esh Winning; Ryton; West Allotment Celtic
- Matches: 462
- Goals: 1,597 (3.46 per match)
- Top goalscorer: Alex Benjamin (Bedlington Terriers) (39 goals)

Division One featured 19 clubs which competed in the division last season, along with three new clubs, promoted from Division Two:

- Jarrow Roofing
- Stokesley
- Sunderland RCA

=== League table ===
Pos	Team	Pld	W	D	L	GF	GA	GD	Pts	Promotion or relegation
1	Spennymoor Town	42	33	4	5	116	31	+85	103	
2	Consett	42	29	6	7	103	51	+52	93	
3	Whitley Bay	42	28	9	5	73	32	+41	93	
4	Newcastle Benfield	42	27	6	9	94	53	+41	87	
5	Shildon	42	26	5	11	114	46	+68	83	
6	West Auckland Town	42	26	4	12	96	62	+34	82	
7	Dunston UTS	42	24	8	10	84	49	+35	80	
8	Ashington	42	21	5	16	83	65	+18	68	
9	Bedlington Terriers	42	20	7	15	94	62	+32	67	
10	Norton & Stockton Ancients	42	19	9	14	66	45	+21	66	
11	South Shields	42	17	7	18	61	66	−5	58	
12	Billingham Synthonia	42	16	9	17	63	65	−2	57	
13	Sunderland RCA	42	15	6	21	67	80	−13	51	
14	Bishop Auckland	42	15	6	21	75	93	−18	51	
15	Billingham Town	42	13	7	22	58	88	−30	46	
16	Stokesley	42	12	9	21	61	85	−24	45	
17	Penrith	42	12	10	20	65	76	−11	43 (Note: Penrith deducted three points for fielding an unregistered player.)	
18	Tow Law Town	42	12	7	23	49	77	−28	43	
19	Jarrow Roofing BCA	42	10	9	23	50	98	−48	39	
20	West Allotment Celtic	42	9	5	28	51	82	−31	32	Relegated to Division Two
21	Esh Winning	42	4	4	34	40	121	−81	16	Relegated to Division Two
22	Ryton	42	2	2	38	34	170	−136	8	Relegated to Division Two

Source: fchd
Rules for classification: 1) points; 2) goal difference; 3) number of goals scored.

=== Results ===
Home \ Away	ASH	BED	BLS	BLT	BIS	CON	DUN	ESH	JRO	NCB	NSA	PEN	RYT	SHI	SSH	SPE	STO	RCA	TOW	WAC	WAT	WHI
Ashington		0–1	2–0	3–1	4–0	2–1	1–0	3–0	2–0	2–2	0–1	3–4	8–0	3–1	2–1	2–6	2–2	1–2	6–2	2–1	1–2	0–3
Bedlington Terriers	1–2		6–2	4–1	3–0	2–2	0–1	3–0	5–0	1–2	1–3	2–1	3–1	1–1	6–2	0–1	6–0	3–3	4–0	1–2	2–1	3–3
Billingham Synthonia	2–1	1–1		2–1	1–0	1–0	0–1	3–3	2–1	0–1	1–3	2–1	6–0	2–3	1–0	0–1	3–1	2–2	2–1	0–0	3–5	2–2
Billingham Town	3–2	1–0	0–3		3–2	0–2	2–4	2–0	2–2	0–4	0–2	1–1	5–2	1–0	1–2	0–5	0–0	0–1	3–0	3–2	2–2	4–1
Bishop Auckland	2–1	1–4	4–2	2–1		2–3	0–0	4–0	3–1	3–4	0–4	2–3	3–0	2–1	2–0	0–2	3–5	3–2	4–1	2–2	1–2	0–2
Consett	2–1	1–0	1–1	3–0	3–3		4–0	4–2	3–2	4–0	3–1	2–1	7–0	2–0	4–1	1–2	6–1	3–0	2–1	2–1	2–3	3–1
Dunston UTS	3–1	1–2	2–1	2–0	3–1	1–0		4–1	4–0	3–0	1–1	0–2	5–0	3–2	3–0	3–2	4–1	2–3	3–1	2–0	0–3	1–2
Esh Winning	1–2	0–3	0–3	0–2	0–2	2–5	1–1		3–3	1–3	0–1	3–1	7–0	0–4	1–2	0–4	0–2	0–1	0–4	0–3	0–3	1–5
Jarrow Roofing BCA	0–5	4–0	0–3	2–1	1–3	1–3	3–3	1–0		0–2	2–2	3–0	1–0	2–2	0–1	0–5	2–1	1–0	1–1	0–4	1–4	0–0
Newcastle Benfield	0–3	3–2	1–1	3–0	4–2	5–1	2–1	7–0	4–0		2–1	2–0	6–0	1–4	1–0	0–3	1–2	5–0	5–0	2–1	0–0	0–3
Norton & Stockton Ancients	0–3	2–2	0–1	3–0	3–0	1–1	1–2	2–0	6–0	1–2		1–1	2–0	1–2	1–1	0–1	4–0	1–0	1–2	1–0	2–4	0–2
Penrith	0–0	1–2	6–1	2–2	2–2	2–3	2–2	2–0	2–2	2–2	0–2		5–0	2–3	1–1	2–4	1–4	1–0	1–2	2–1	1–4	0–2
Ryton	0–1	0–3	5–3	2–2	3–5	1–3	1–5	4–5	0–3	2–5	0–2	2–3		0–7	1–3	0–2	0–5	0–4	1–1	0–2	2–5	0–2
Shildon	4–0	1–1	0–1	7–0	7–1	1–1	0–2	6–2	2–1	4–0	3–1	5–1	10–0		1–2	0–1	4–1	3–1	4–1	1–0	4–0	1–2
South Shields	0–1	2–4	2–1	0–1	1–1	0–2	0–1	4–2	5–2	0–1	2–2	3–1	5–0	1–2		0–3	0–2	3–2	4–1	3–0	3–1	0–3
Spennymoor Town	5–0	4–0	2–0	2–0	2–1	1–3	2–2	3–1	4–1	2–1	1–2	2–0	8–1	2–1	4–0		5–0	1–1	3–0	6–1	4–0	2–2
Stokesley	2–2	0–2	0–0	4–3	3–4	1–2	1–1	1–1	1–1	0–1	2–0	0–4	4–1	1–2	0–0	3–2		1–1	0–2	2–1	2–3	0–1
Sunderland RCA	3–2	2–0	2–0	4–3	0–3	1–1	0–5	7–0	4–1	1–4	1–3	3–0	1–2	1–2	1–2	0–2	3–2		1–2	1–1	3–2	0–2
Tow Law Town	1–2	3–2	1–1	3–2	3–0	1–2	0–0	2–1	0–1	2–2	0–0	0–0	3–1	1–3	0–1	0–2	0–2	3–4		2–0	0–1	0–1
West Allotment Celtic	2–2	1–5	0–2	1–2	1–1	2–3	3–0	1–2	2–3	1–3	1–0	0–1	2–1	0–4	2–3	1–2	3–1	2–0	0–2		2–7	0–2
West Auckland Town	4–1	3–2	2–1	0–1	4–1	1–2	1–2	3–0	3–1	0–1	1–1	0–3	5–0	1–2	1–1	2–1	3–1	4–1	2–0	1–0		0–3
Whitley Bay	0–2	3–1	1–0	2–2	2–1	2–1	2–1	1–0	2–0	0–0	0–1	1–0	3–1	0–0	0–0	0–0	1–0	2–0	2–0	3–2	2–3	

Legend: Blue = home team win; Yellow = draw; Red = away team win.

== Division Two ==
Northern Football League Division Two
- Season: 2010–11
- Champions: Newton Aycliffe
- Promoted: Guisborough Town; Marske United; Newton Aycliffe
- Matches: 380
- Goals: 1,484 (3.91 per match)
- Top goalscorer: Warren Byrne (Newton Aycliffe) (44 goals)

Division Two featured 17 clubs which competed in the division last season, along with three new clubs, relegated from Division One:

- Chester-Le-Street Town
- Horden Colliery Welfare
- Morpeth Town

=== League table ===
Pos	Team	Pld	W	D	L	GF	GA	GD	Pts	Promotion
1	Newton Aycliffe	38	30	5	3	116	38	+78	95	Promoted to Division One
2	Guisborough Town	38	28	4	6	110	52	+58	88	Promoted to Division One
3	Marske United	38	25	7	6	95	41	+54	82	Promoted to Division One
4	North Shields	38	24	8	6	98	36	+62	80	
5	Team Northumbria	38	24	1	13	88	45	+43	73	
6	Whickham	38	21	5	12	70	51	+19	68	
7	Whitehaven	38	18	8	12	104	85	+19	62	
8	Chester-le-Street Town	38	18	5	15	78	63	+15	59	
9	Northallerton Town	38	17	7	14	80	58	+22	58	
10	Hebburn Town	38	17	5	16	76	72	+4	53 (Note: Hebburn Town deducted three points for fielding an ineligible player.)	
11	Gillford Park	38	14	9	15	63	59	+4	51	
12	Crook Town	38	15	5	18	77	80	−3	50	
13	Birtley Town	38	13	10	15	70	89	−19	49	
14	Thornaby	38	12	6	20	53	84	−31	42	
15	Darlington Railway Athletic	38	12	3	23	54	92	−38	39	
16	Washington	38	9	7	22	46	95	−49	34	
17	Seaham Red Star	38	9	4	25	66	118	−52	31	
18	Horden Colliery Welfare	38	8	4	26	52	95	−43	28	
19	Brandon United	38	5	8	25	41	86	−45	23	
20	Morpeth Town	38	4	3	31	47	145	−98	15	

Source: fchd
Rules for classification: 1) points; 2) goal difference; 3) number of goals scored.

=== Results ===
Home \ Away	BIR	BRA	CLS	CRO	DRA	GIL	GUI	HEB	HCW	MAR	MOR	NTA	NSH	NOR	SRS	TNO	THO	WAS	WHC	WHA
Birtley Town		1–3	2–1	4–7	1–1	2–2	3–3	3–2	4–2	1–1	5–3	1–6	2–0	0–0	4–2	0–6	1–0	2–4	0–2	2–1
Brandon United	0–1		0–2	1–2	1–3	0–2	0–2	1–1	1–1	1–2	1–1	1–4	2–2	1–3	2–4	0–1	3–2	1–0	2–4	1–2
Chester-le-Street Town	2–2	3–2		3–2	4–2	2–0	5–0	2–1	3–1	0–1	2–0	2–3	1–3	0–4	3–0	3–2	2–1	2–1	0–1	2–4
Crook Town	1–2	4–1	0–3		4–0	1–1	2–4	2–3	6–0	2–8	2–1	0–4	2–0	2–3	2–3	2–1	1–4	2–0	1–1	3–5
Darlington Railway Athletic	2–1	2–0	1–4	0–3		0–5	1–2	3–1	3–1	1–1	6–3	0–5	2–4	0–5	3–0	0–2	1–2	3–1	0–0	1–4
Gillford Park	3–2	2–2	1–5	0–1	3–1		1–4	0–1	1–3	0–2	4–0	0–2	0–1	1–1	4–0	2–1	2–2	4–0	3–1	1–1
Guisborough Town	2–2	4–0	4–1	5–2	4–0	4–3		1–4	5–1	1–2	9–1	2–2	1–0	1–3	3–2	1–0	1–0	8–1	1–1	5–2
Hebburn Town	4–0	2–1	2–1	2–2	0–1	1–2	0–3		4–2	1–3	5–0	1–5	4–1	1–6	2–1	2–3	3–1	1–1	2–3	2–4
Horden Colliery Welfare	0–1	1–2	2–1	2–4	2–0	1–2	1–3	0–2		0–2	6–0	1–3	1–4	0–2	0–3	0–3	4–1	1–3	1–2	3–3
Marske United	3–1	5–0	7–2	2–0	1–2	1–0	2–1	1–1	1–1		7–1	0–2	1–1	1–1	4–0	1–0	5–0	4–3	3–1	4–2
Morpeth Town	5–4	1–5	2–5	1–4	1–2	3–1	1–5	1–2	0–1	0–3		1–2	1–2	0–5	1–3	0–0	2–5	3–2	2–1	0–5
Newton Aycliffe	5–1	3–0	2–2	2–0	1–0	2–2	2–3	1–1	8–2	2–1	5–0		3–2	1–1	2–0	2–1	5–1	4–0	1–0	3–0
North Shields	2–2	4–0	2–1	0–1	4–1	1–0	0–1	1–4	2–0	4–1	4–1	0–3		1–1	4–0	1–0	3–0	7–1	1–0	0–1
Northallerton Town	0–0	3–0	2–1	3–0	2–0	0–1	1–2	8–3	1–3	1–3	9–0	0–2	2–2		5–2	1–3	0–1	5–0	2–3	5–3
Seaham Red Star	1–1	2–2	0–5	1–6	5–2	4–0	1–5	0–3	4–2	0–3	3–3	1–6	4–4	1–4		2–5	2–4	3–1	1–4	3–6
Team Northumbria	4–0	1–0	3–2	2–0	1–0	2–0	2–0	4–0	1–2	1–4	5–2	4–0	3–1	1–2	3–1		2–1	4–0	0–1	8–3
Thornaby	1–4	4–0	0–0	2–1	1–0	2–2	1–4	0–5	1–0	3–1	3–1	0–4	0–1	1–1	1–0	1–3		0–3	3–3	2–6
Washington	0–4	2–2	1–1	2–2	1–0	0–3	0–2	2–0	2–2	2–0	4–1	3–0	0–1	1–9	0–4	1–5	1–1		0–1	1–2
Whickham	3–0	1–0	2–0	3–0	3–5	1–3	1–2	1–3	3–0	1–3	2–0	2–5	0–1	4–1	4–1	2–1	3–1	1–1		2–0
Whitehaven	5–4	2–2	0–0	1–1	9–5	2–2	1–2	1–0	4–2	1–1	6–4	2–4	1–1	0–4	5–2	5–0	4–0	0–1	1–2	

Legend: Blue = home team win; Yellow = draw; Red = away team win.
