= Andy Madley =

English football referee

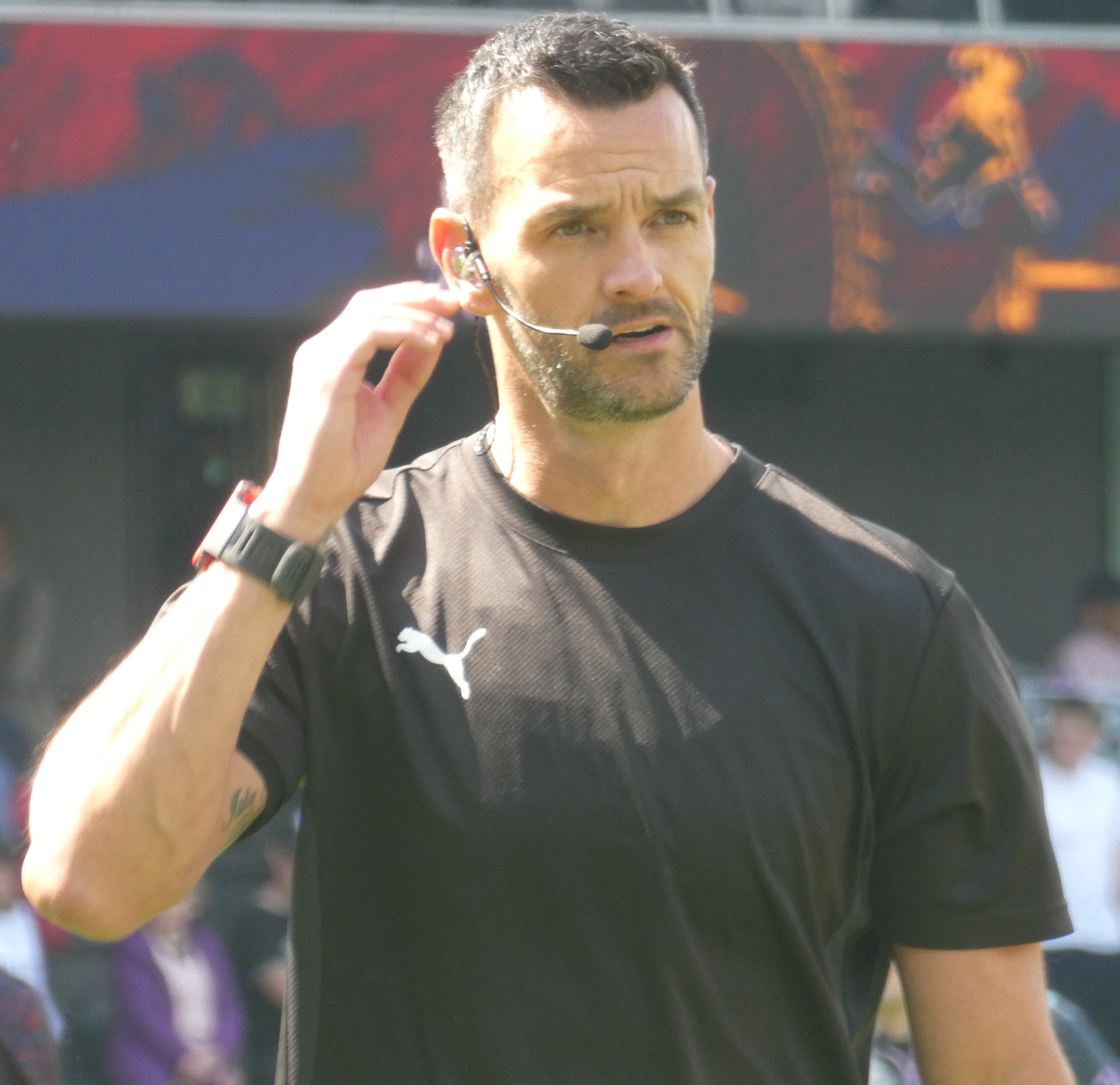
- Madley in 2026
- Full name: Andrew Madley
- Born: 5 September 1983 (age 43); Huddersfield, West Yorkshire, England

Domestic
Years	League	Role
2008–2010	The Football League	Assistant Referee
2009–2011	Conference	Referee
2010–2011	Premier League	Assistant Referee
2011–2019	Football League	Referee
2019–	Premier League	Referee

Andrew Madley (born 5 September 1983) is an English football referee from Huddersfield, West Yorkshire who currently officiates in the Premier League.

== Career ==
Madley began his refereeing career on the local Wakefield leagues. He quickly advanced through the levels before becoming a Level 3A referee in 2008. This allowed him to act as an assistant referee on the three Football League divisions. The following year he was promoted to the Panel List which allowed him to referee in the Conference divisions. He then progressed further the following year by becoming a Select Group Assistant Referee, officiating on the Premier League. In 2011, he progressed to his current role, a National List Referee, officiating in the three Football League divisions. Andy is the older brother of former Select Group Referee Bobby Madley.

For the start of the 2016–17 season, Madley was included as a Select Group 2 referee which sees him primarily referee in the Championship. He took charge of a Premier League game for the first time on 31 March 2018, a 2–2 draw between Watford and Bournemouth.

In June 2019, Madley was promoted to the Select Group 1 Referees list which will see him referee primarily in the Premier League.

== Matches ==
Madley refereed the Football League Two play-off semi final between Cheltenham Town and Northampton Town on 4 May 2013 which ended 0–1 (0–2 agg). He also refereed the FA Vase final on 9 May 2015 between Glossop North End and North Shields, which finished 1–2.

Madley refereed the Football League One play-off final between Preston North End and Swindon Town on 24 May 2015.

On 19 May 2019, Madley refereed the FA Trophy final at Wembley Stadium between Leyton Orient and AFC Fylde ending in a 0–1 win for AFC Fylde. He also refereed the EFL League One play-off final between Charlton Athletic and Sunderland on 26 May 2019, which Charlton won 2–1.

On 25 May 2024, Madley refereed the FA Cup final at Wembley between Manchester City and Manchester United.
