= 2011–12 Northern Football League =

The 2011–12 Northern Football League season was the 114th in the history of Northern Football League, a football competition in England.

== Division One ==
Northern Football League Division One
- Season: 2011–12
- Champions: Spennymoor Town
- Relegated: Jarrow Roofing; Stokesley Sports Club; Tow Law Town
- Matches: 462
- Goals: 1,664 (3.6 per match)
- Top goalscorer: Andrew Johnson (Bishop Auckland) (39 goals)

Division One featured 19 clubs which competed in the division last season, along with three new clubs, promoted from Division Two:

- Guisborough Town
- Marske United
- Newton Aycliffe

Also, Stokesley changed back name to Stokesley Sports Club.

=== League table ===
| Pos | Team | Pld | W | D | L | GF | GA | GD | Pts | Promotion or relegation |
|---|---|---|---|---|---|---|---|---|---|---|
| 1 | Spennymoor Town | 42 | 30 | 7 | 5 | 86 | 31 | +55 | 97 | |
| 2 | West Auckland Town | 42 | 29 | 8 | 5 | 117 | 58 | +59 | 95 | |
| 3 | Dunston UTS | 42 | 27 | 9 | 6 | 85 | 34 | +51 | 90 | |
| 4 | Sunderland RCA | 42 | 27 | 7 | 8 | 106 | 54 | +52 | 88 | |
| 5 | Ashington | 42 | 23 | 8 | 11 | 91 | 58 | +33 | 77 | |
| 6 | Whitley Bay | 42 | 23 | 7 | 12 | 90 | 54 | +36 | 76 | |
| 7 | Bedlington Terriers | 42 | 20 | 10 | 12 | 97 | 49 | +48 | 70 | |
| 8 | Bishop Auckland | 42 | 20 | 9 | 13 | 87 | 69 | +18 | 69 | |
| 9 | Newton Aycliffe | 42 | 18 | 11 | 13 | 70 | 52 | +18 | 65 | |
| 10 | Shildon | 42 | 18 | 5 | 19 | 83 | 63 | +20 | 59 | |
| 11 | Billingham Synthonia | 42 | 18 | 5 | 19 | 74 | 77 | −3 | 59 | |
| 12 | Newcastle Benfield | 42 | 16 | 7 | 19 | 73 | 65 | +8 | 55 | |
| 13 | South Shields | 42 | 15 | 6 | 21 | 81 | 92 | −11 | 51 | |
| 14 | Norton & Stockton Ancients | 42 | 14 | 8 | 20 | 54 | 60 | −6 | 50 | |
| 15 | Consett | 42 | 13 | 11 | 18 | 71 | 78 | −7 | 50 | |
| 16 | Guisborough Town | 42 | 13 | 11 | 18 | 67 | 97 | −30 | 50 | |
| 17 | Billingham Town | 42 | 15 | 4 | 23 | 72 | 95 | −23 | 49 | |
| 18 | Marske United | 42 | 11 | 11 | 20 | 61 | 89 | −28 | 44 | |
| 19 | Penrith | 42 | 11 | 7 | 24 | 59 | 97 | −38 | 40 | |
| 20 | Jarrow Roofing BCA | 42 | 12 | 4 | 26 | 65 | 114 | −49 | 40 | Relegated to Division Two |
| 21 | Tow Law Town | 42 | 9 | 1 | 32 | 44 | 102 | −58 | 28 | Relegated to Division Two |
| 22 | Stokesley Sports Club | 42 | 0 | 4 | 38 | 31 | 176 | −145 | 4 | Relegated to Division Two |

Source: fchd
Rules for classification: 1) points; 2) goal difference; 3) number of goals scored.

=== Results ===
| Home \ Away | ASH | BED | BLS | BLT | BIS | CON | DUN | GUI | JRO | MAR | NCB | NTA | NSA | PEN | SHI | SSH | SPE | SSC | RCA | TOW | WAT | WHI |
|---|---|---|---|---|---|---|---|---|---|---|---|---|---|---|---|---|---|---|---|---|---|---|
| Ashington | | 1–4 | 2–1 | 3–0 | 7–1 | 3–1 | 2–0 | 2–0 | 5–1 | 1–1 | 0–1 | 2–2 | 3–1 | 6–1 | 2–0 | 2–2 | 4–1 | 3–0 | 0–4 | 2–1 | 3–1 | 1–3 |
| Bedlington Terriers | 2–4 | | 1–2 | 2–0 | 0–1 | 0–2 | 0–0 | 1–2 | 2–1 | 3–0 | 5–0 | 1–1 | 2–1 | 4–1 | 2–1 | 4–2 | 0–2 | 15–0 | 1–2 | 5–2 | 3–1 | 4–0 |
| Billingham Synthonia | 0–2 | 2–2 | | 3–1 | 2–1 | 1–2 | 1–2 | 0–0 | 4–1 | 2–2 | 2–0 | 0–0 | 1–2 | 3–1 | 0–3 | 2–3 | 1–3 | 4–0 | 0–1 | 5–4 | 1–3 | 3–1 |
| Billingham Town | 2–3 | 0–7 | 2–1 | | 1–1 | 0–1 | 0–2 | 3–3 | 4–5 | 3–1 | 5–2 | 0–5 | 2–1 | 2–1 | 0–1 | 3–2 | 0–1 | 2–2 | 2–4 | 3–2 | 1–2 | 0–2 |
| Bishop Auckland | 1–0 | 2–3 | 2–3 | 5–0 | | 3–2 | 1–2 | 2–0 | 1–3 | 2–2 | 3–2 | 1–1 | 2–0 | 5–3 | 2–0 | 2–2 | 1–0 | 3–1 | 0–0 | 3–0 | 1–1 | 1–3 |
| Consett | 1–2 | 0–0 | 1–5 | 2–0 | 1–1 | | 2–2 | 4–2 | 5–1 | 0–4 | 0–2 | 2–2 | 0–0 | 0–0 | 1–5 | 4–3 | 1–0 | 8–1 | 3–4 | 4–1 | 0–3 | 0–4 |
| Dunston UTS | 2–0 | 1–1 | 2–1 | 3–0 | 1–2 | 2–0 | | 2–2 | 1–0 | 5–1 | 1–0 | 0–0 | 1–0 | 5–1 | 2–4 | 3–0 | 0–0 | 5–0 | 2–1 | 5–0 | 1–3 | 1–1 |
| Guisborough Town | 2–2 | 1–1 | 3–3 | 0–2 | 1–2 | 1–4 | 0–1 | | 3–1 | 1–1 | 1–4 | 0–1 | 1–1 | 2–1 | 2–1 | 3–1 | 2–1 | 6–0 | 0–7 | 3–1 | 0–7 | 0–4 |
| Jarrow Roofing BCA | 1–1 | 0–2 | 1–2 | 1–7 | 2–4 | 2–1 | 0–3 | 3–3 | | 0–3 | 0–2 | 0–3 | 0–2 | 2–1 | 0–3 | 3–2 | 4–2 | 4–2 | 0–3 | 0–1 | 2–2 | 1–4 |
| Marske United | 1–2 | 2–2 | 0–2 | 1–2 | 2–2 | 2–2 | 2–6 | 1–3 | 4–0 | | 2–1 | 3–1 | 0–2 | 0–3 | 2–1 | 2–5 | 1–1 | 5–0 | 0–2 | 2–1 | 1–4 | 0–0 |
| Newcastle Benfield | 2–1 | 1–1 | 0–2 | 5–2 | 1–3 | 4–2 | 1–2 | 2–3 | 2–3 | 3–0 | | 1–1 | 2–3 | 1–2 | 2–1 | 4–0 | 1–2 | 1–0 | 1–2 | 5–0 | 1–3 | 1–1 |
| Newton Aycliffe | 1–1 | 1–0 | 2–1 | 3–2 | 2–1 | 2–1 | 0–1 | 4–2 | 5–3 | 2–0 | 1–2 | | 3–1 | 1–2 | 2–4 | 1–4 | 0–1 | 6–1 | 0–2 | 1–1 | 1–2 | 2–1 |
| Norton & Stockton Ancients | 1–1 | 1–2 | 0–1 | 0–1 | 1–3 | 0–1 | 2–3 | 3–1 | 2–2 | 3–0 | 1–0 | 1–1 | | 2–0 | 2–1 | 0–3 | 2–2 | 3–0 | 0–3 | 2–0 | 2–2 | 1–3 |
| Penrith | 2–2 | 2–2 | 3–4 | 3–0 | 1–5 | 0–0 | 0–4 | 1–0 | 4–1 | 5–2 | 0–5 | 1–0 | 0–3 | | 1–4 | 0–1 | 0–3 | 4–0 | 0–1 | 2–1 | 4–4 | 2–4 |
| Shildon | 2–3 | 1–0 | 0–1 | 1–2 | 2–2 | 2–2 | 0–1 | 2–1 | 3–4 | 5–1 | 2–2 | 1–4 | 2–0 | 0–2 | | 1–0 | 1–2 | 11–0 | 2–3 | 3–1 | 1–2 | 1–1 |
| South Shields | 0–1 | 0–0 | 5–1 | 1–5 | 2–1 | 2–0 | 0–1 | 3–4 | 2–1 | 3–4 | 1–1 | 2–1 | 2–4 | 1–0 | 1–2 | | 0–3 | 5–2 | 2–3 | 3–1 | 3–4 | 3–2 |
| Spennymoor Town | 2–1 | 2–1 | 2–0 | 2–1 | 2–1 | 1–1 | 1–0 | 1–1 | 3–1 | 2–0 | 1–1 | 1–0 | 2–0 | 5–0 | 3–0 | 5–0 | | 5–1 | 2–0 | 3–0 | 1–1 | 2–0 |
| Stokesley Sports Club | 0–7 | 1–5 | 0–5 | 1–3 | 2–3 | 2–7 | 0–3 | 1–2 | 2–3 | 1–3 | 1–2 | 0–3 | 0–0 | 2–2 | 0–2 | 1–1 | 0–3 | | 1–6 | 1–2 | 0–3 | 2–7 |
| Sunderland RCA | 5–1 | 3–1 | 2–0 | 2–2 | 3–2 | 2–2 | 2–1 | 7–0 | 2–3 | 2–2 | 3–1 | 0–0 | 4–1 | 1–1 | 2–2 | 1–2 | 1–4 | 2–1 | | 3–0 | 2–3 | 4–3 |
| Tow Law Town | 1–2 | 0–3 | 2–1 | 1–4 | 2–6 | 4–1 | 0–3 | 0–1 | 2–3 | 0–1 | 1–0 | 1–2 | 0–2 | 2–0 | 1–3 | 2–1 | 1–3 | 3–2 | 2–1 | | 0–2 | 0–1 |
| West Auckland Town | 2–1 | 2–1 | 9–1 | 2–1 | 3–1 | 2–0 | 1–1 | 7–3 | 4–2 | 0–0 | 0–3 | 1–2 | 2–1 | 5–1 | 2–1 | 5–5 | 1–3 | 3–0 | 2–1 | 3–0 | | 6–1 |
| Whitley Bay | 2–0 | 1–2 | 4–0 | 5–2 | 3–1 | 1–0 | 2–2 | 2–2 | 1–0 | 4–0 | 1–1 | 1–0 | 1–0 | 2–1 | 0–1 | 3–1 | 0–1 | 6–0 | 2–3 | 2–0 | 1–2 | |

Legend: Blue = home team win; Yellow = draw; Red = away team win.

== Division Two ==
Northern Football League Division Two
- Season: 2011–12
- Champions: Team Northumbria
- Promoted: Gillford Park; Hebburn Town; Team Northumbria
- Relegated: Easington Colliery
- Matches: 462
- Goals: 1,792 (3.88 per match)
- Top goalscorer: Peter Watling (Team Northumbria) (39 goals)

Division Two featured 17 clubs which competed in the division last season, along with five new clubs.

- Clubs relegated from Division One:
  - Esh Winning
  - Ryton, who also changed name to Ryton & Crawcrook Albion
  - West Allotment Celtic
- Plus:
  - Alnwick Town, promoted from the Northern Football Alliance
  - Easington Colliery, promoted from the Wearside Football League

=== League table ===
| Pos | Team | Pld | W | D | L | GF | GA | GD | Pts | Promotion or relegation |
|---|---|---|---|---|---|---|---|---|---|---|
| 1 | Team Northumbria | 42 | 28 | 5 | 9 | 112 | 49 | +63 | 89 | Promoted to Division One |
| 2 | Gillford Park | 42 | 27 | 8 | 7 | 125 | 62 | +63 | 86 (Note: Gillford Park deducted three points for fielding an ineligible player.) | Promoted to Division One |
| 3 | Hebburn Town | 42 | 26 | 4 | 12 | 110 | 73 | +37 | 82 | Promoted to Division One |
| 4 | Morpeth Town | 42 | 22 | 10 | 10 | 78 | 54 | +24 | 76 | |
| 5 | Darlington Railway Athletic | 42 | 22 | 7 | 13 | 84 | 68 | +16 | 73 | |
| 6 | Birtley Town | 42 | 21 | 9 | 12 | 100 | 77 | +23 | 72 | |
| 7 | West Allotment Celtic | 42 | 21 | 8 | 13 | 90 | 72 | +18 | 71 | |
| 8 | North Shields | 42 | 19 | 11 | 12 | 77 | 51 | +26 | 68 | |
| 9 | Northallerton Town | 42 | 19 | 11 | 12 | 99 | 74 | +25 | 68 | |
| 10 | Crook Town | 42 | 18 | 13 | 11 | 99 | 69 | +30 | 67 | |
| 11 | Esh Winning | 42 | 20 | 6 | 16 | 95 | 74 | +21 | 66 | |
| 12 | Chester-le-Street Town | 42 | 16 | 8 | 18 | 70 | 63 | +7 | 56 | |
| 13 | Whitehaven | 42 | 15 | 9 | 18 | 71 | 79 | −8 | 54 | |
| 14 | Washington | 42 | 16 | 5 | 21 | 69 | 97 | −28 | 53 | |
| 15 | Whickham | 42 | 13 | 10 | 19 | 76 | 82 | −6 | 49 | |
| 16 | Alnwick Town | 42 | 13 | 10 | 19 | 56 | 86 | −30 | 49 | |
| 17 | Brandon United | 42 | 13 | 7 | 22 | 70 | 94 | −24 | 46 | |
| 18 | Ryton & Crawcrook Albion | 42 | 13 | 5 | 24 | 68 | 117 | −49 | 44 | |
| 19 | Thornaby | 42 | 11 | 8 | 23 | 78 | 110 | −32 | 41 | |
| 20 | Seaham Red Star | 42 | 8 | 7 | 27 | 61 | 113 | −52 | 31 | |
| 21 | Horden Colliery Welfare | 42 | 8 | 6 | 28 | 44 | 92 | −48 | 30 | |
| 22 | Easington Colliery | 42 | 6 | 7 | 29 | 60 | 136 | −76 | 22 (Note: Easington Colliery deducted three points for failing to fulfil a fixture.) | Relegated to the Wearside League |

Source: fchd
Rules for classification: 1) points; 2) goal difference; 3) number of goals scored.

=== Results ===
| Home \ Away | ALN | BIR | BRA | CLS | CRO | DRA | ESC | ESH | GIL | HEB | HCW | MOR | NSH | NOR | RYC | SRS | TNO | THO | WAS | WAC | WHC | WHA |
|---|---|---|---|---|---|---|---|---|---|---|---|---|---|---|---|---|---|---|---|---|---|---|
| Alnwick Town | | 1–3 | 0–2 | 2–1 | 1–5 | 0–3 | 2–1 | 0–1 | 1–3 | 0–5 | 3–0 | 0–3 | 1–1 | 1–1 | 1–2 | 5–2 | 0–7 | 1–0 | 3–2 | 1–0 | 3–1 | 2–1 |
| Birtley Town | 1–1 | | 2–1 | 2–0 | 2–3 | 1–3 | 4–1 | 3–2 | 2–2 | 2–2 | 1–0 | 4–2 | 1–1 | 3–0 | 0–1 | 6–1 | 1–4 | 3–4 | 5–1 | 2–5 | 1–0 | 4–0 |
| Brandon United | 2–1 | 0–3 | | 0–2 | 1–1 | 2–0 | 4–1 | 1–6 | 0–1 | 6–3 | 4–1 | 0–3 | 1–2 | 5–5 | 3–0 | 2–3 | 2–2 | 2–3 | 4–1 | 5–1 | 1–1 | 0–2 |
| Chester-le-Street Town | 4–3 | 1–2 | 1–0 | | 0–1 | 0–2 | 2–0 | 2–2 | 1–2 | 4–0 | 1–0 | 1–0 | 1–1 | 1–1 | 4–0 | 5–2 | 0–2 | 2–4 | 3–1 | 0–2 | 0–3 | 1–2 |
| Crook Town | 1–1 | 4–0 | 1–1 | 0–0 | | 0–2 | 7–1 | 1–4 | 3–3 | 1–5 | 2–1 | 1–1 | 0–1 | 1–1 | 6–0 | 1–3 | 2–3 | 4–1 | 5–1 | 2–2 | 1–1 | 3–0 |
| Darlington Railway Athletic | 4–0 | 3–1 | 0–2 | 2–1 | 3–1 | | 2–3 | 5–0 | 5–1 | 0–6 | 2–1 | 1–1 | 1–1 | 1–0 | 1–0 | 2–1 | 3–1 | 4–2 | 3–2 | 1–2 | 1–0 | 2–2 |
| Easington Colliery | 0–1 | 1–4 | 6–0 | 0–3 | 0–2 | 2–3 | | 0–3 | 0–4 | 2–5 | 4–2 | 2–2 | 0–3 | 1–3 | 0–3 | 1–0 | 2–4 | 3–5 | 1–4 | 1–3 | 2–3 | 2–2 |
| Esh Winning | 0–1 | 1–1 | 2–3 | 3–0 | 5–5 | 3–0 | 5–3 | | 2–5 | 2–3 | 2–1 | 0–2 | 0–2 | 2–1 | 3–4 | 4–1 | 4–1 | 7–1 | 1–2 | 1–0 | 3–3 | 3–0 |
| Gillford Park | 3–1 | 4–4 | 5–1 | 2–1 | 4–0 | 2–2 | 1–1 | 3–0 | | 1–2 | 11–1 | 1–2 | 3–0 | 4–4 | 4–3 | 5–1 | 1–2 | 7–2 | 2–0 | 0–1 | 3–0 | 4–1 |
| Hebburn Town | 4–1 | 1–2 | 3–0 | 1–4 | 1–4 | 4–4 | 3–1 | 1–3 | 1–2 | | 5–2 | 2–1 | 0–2 | 2–2 | 8–2 | 6–3 | 0–0 | 4–3 | 3–1 | 3–1 | 4–0 | 0–5 |
| Horden Colliery Welfare | 1–2 | 2–1 | 0–1 | 3–4 | 0–1 | 3–1 | 0–1 | 1–1 | 0–0 | 1–4 | | 1–0 | 0–0 | 1–1 | 4–1 | 1–2 | 1–3 | 1–2 | 0–2 | 1–3 | 1–2 | 1–0 |
| Morpeth Town | 3–3 | 0–3 | 3–1 | 3–2 | 3–0 | 2–0 | 1–0 | 2–0 | 1–1 | 2–1 | 2–0 | | 2–1 | 0–1 | 2–1 | 2–0 | 2–2 | 1–1 | 5–1 | 4–2 | 2–1 | 3–0 |
| North Shields | 1–1 | 2–2 | 2–2 | 0–1 | 2–4 | 5–2 | 2–2 | 3–0 | 2–3 | 0–2 | 4–0 | 1–2 | | 2–0 | 5–1 | 3–1 | 0–1 | 1–0 | 2–4 | 2–1 | 1–1 | 2–0 |
| Northallerton Town | 3–0 | 2–3 | 4–1 | 0–0 | 3–0 | 2–1 | 6–1 | 3–3 | 1–4 | 2–1 | 3–1 | 4–3 | 2–2 | | 3–1 | 2–3 | 4–5 | 3–0 | 3–2 | 0–1 | 3–0 | 2–0 |
| Ryton & Crawcrook Albion | 1–1 | 1–3 | 0–4 | 1–4 | 1–6 | 0–4 | 3–3 | 2–1 | 1–3 | 1–2 | 2–2 | 2–2 | 2–5 | 4–1 | | 5–4 | 2–4 | 1–1 | 2–1 | 1–0 | 1–3 | 1–3 |
| Seaham Red Star | 4–2 | 3–4 | 0–0 | 0–0 | 0–5 | 2–4 | 0–1 | 1–3 | 2–5 | 0–1 | 2–2 | 2–2 | 0–2 | 0–2 | 2–3 | | 1–0 | 2–1 | 6–0 | 3–3 | 1–6 | 0–1 |
| Team Northumbria | 2–1 | 4–1 | 2–0 | 5–1 | 2–2 | 2–0 | 14–0 | 0–1 | 2–3 | 0–2 | 5–0 | 2–0 | 0–1 | 2–1 | 0–2 | 2–0 | | 4–0 | 4–2 | 0–0 | 3–1 | 2–0 |
| Thornaby | 3–4 | 2–2 | 4–2 | 2–2 | 2–2 | 1–2 | 7–1 | 2–0 | 2–5 | 1–2 | 1–2 | 4–4 | 0–6 | 1–6 | 4–3 | 2–0 | 0–2 | | 2–1 | 2–2 | 0–1 | 1–2 |
| Washington | 0–0 | 0–2 | 3–2 | 1–0 | 1–3 | 1–1 | 2–2 | 1–6 | 3–2 | 1–2 | 1–0 | 1–0 | 2–1 | 2–5 | 3–2 | 4–0 | 0–4 | 3–1 | | 1–1 | 3–1 | 2–2 |
| West Allotment Celtic | 3–2 | 3–2 | 3–1 | 3–1 | 2–2 | 3–2 | 8–4 | 1–2 | 2–3 | 2–1 | 3–0 | 3–0 | 2–0 | 3–3 | 5–1 | 5–0 | 1–5 | 2–1 | 3–0 | | 0–2 | 2–4 |
| Whickham | 1–1 | 6–5 | 6–1 | 1–1 | 3–1 | 5–2 | 2–2 | 0–3 | 2–1 | 0–2 | 1–3 | 0–1 | 1–2 | 1–4 | 1–2 | 3–3 | 1–2 | 2–2 | 1–3 | 5–0 | | 0–3 |
| Whitehaven | 1–1 | 2–2 | 5–0 | 2–8 | 1–5 | 0–0 | 2–1 | 3–1 | 0–2 | 2–3 | 1–2 | 1–2 | 2–1 | 5–2 | 1–2 | 0–0 | 4–1 | 2–1 | 2–3 | 1–1 | 4–4 | |

Legend: Blue = home team win; Yellow = draw; Red = away team win.
