= 1976–77 Northern Football League =

The 1976–77 Northern Football League season was the 79th in the history of Northern Football League, a football competition in England.

== Clubs ==
Northern Football League
- Season: 1976–77
- Champions: Spennymoor United
- Matches: 380
- Goals: 1,205 (3.17 per match)

Division One featured 20 clubs which competed in the league last season, no new clubs joined the division this season.

=== League table ===
Pos	Team	Pld	W	D	L	GF	GA	GD	Pts
1	Spennymoor United	38	22	10	6	72	38	+34	76
2	Consett	38	22	10	6	71	45	+26	76
3	Whitby Town	38	21	8	9	97	62	+35	71
4	Crook Town	38	19	11	8	63	40	+23	68
5	Blyth Spartans	38	19	9	10	80	49	+31	66
6	North Shields	38	19	8	11	62	51	+11	65
7	Whitley Bay	38	19	8	11	73	62	+11	65
8	Bishop Auckland	38	17	9	12	67	47	+20	60
9	Ashington	38	17	8	13	84	61	+23	57 (Note: Ashington were deducted two points.)
10	South Bank	38	15	5	18	53	58	−5	50
11	Willington	38	13	10	15	66	68	−2	49
12	Durham City	38	12	11	15	44	53	−9	47
13	Horden Colliery Welfare	38	12	10	16	59	65	−6	46
14	Ferryhill Athletic	38	12	10	16	42	58	−16	46
15	Evenwood Town	38	13	4	21	54	72	−18	43
16	West Auckland Town	38	12	7	19	45	69	−24	43
17	Tow Law Town	38	11	8	19	55	73	−18	41
18	Billingham Synthonia	38	9	6	23	37	64	−27	33
19	Shildon	38	6	9	23	32	75	−43	27
20	Penrith	38	4	11	23	49	95	−46	23

Source: fchd
Rules for classification: 1) points; 2) goal difference; 3) number of goals scored.
