= 2015 FA Vase final =

- Event: 2014–15 FA Vase
Glossop North End	North Shields
1	2
- Date: 9 May 2015
- Venue: Wembley Stadium, London

The 2014–15 FA Vase final was the 41st final of the Football Association's cup competition for teams at levels 9-11 of the English football league system. The match was contested between North Shields, of the Northern League Division 1 (level 9), and Glossop North End, of the North West Counties League Premier Division (level 9). North Shields won the final 2-1 after extra time.

== Route to the Final ==
With a maximum of 9 rounds needed to reach the Final, North Shields played in every round. They played five away ties and three home ties plus the semi-final round, winning each round without need of a replay. Glossop on the other hand only played in seven of the rounds, receiving a bye into the First Round Proper. They were drawn with four away ties and two home ties, although both later rounds required a replay to decide the winner.

This was North Shields' first visit to Wembley since 1969 when they won the FA Amateur Cup final. In comparison, Glossop were visiting the home of football for the second time in six years, having lost the 2009 FA Vase Final to another Northern League team, Whitley Bay.

== Build up ==
After a meeting at Wembley Stadium the week after the semi-finals, where both teams met with The Football Association to decide the choice of dressing rooms, the kit selections and TV rights, tickets for the final were released on sale on 1 April 2015, with Glossop and North Shields expecting to sell thousands of tickets compared with an average home crowds of 340 and 322 respectively.

In the week before the final, Glossop trained at Everton's Finch Farm on the Sunday and at Arsenal's Training Centre on the Friday before the final. Glossop set up a club shop in their town to sell Wembley merchandise.

== Match ==
=== Details ===
9 May 2015
15:00

Glossop North End	1–2 (a.e.t.)	North Shields
Tom Bailey 55'	report report	Gareth Bainbridge 80'; Adam Forster 95'

Wembley Stadium, London
Attendance: 9,674
Referee: Andrew Madley (West Riding FA)

GK	1	Greg Hall
DF	2	Michael Bowler
DF	3	Matt Russell
DF	4	Kelvin Lugsden
DF	5	Dave Young (c)
MF	6	Martin Parker
MF	7	Lee Blackshaw		(substituted off) 69'
MF	18	Sam Hare	(yellow card) 50'	(substituted off) 82'
FW	9	Tom Bailey
MF	10	Kieran Lugsden
MF	11	Eddie Moran		(substituted off) 61'
Substitutes:
	12	Daniel White		(substituted on) 61'
	14	Ben Richardson
	15	Sam Hind		(substituted on) 82'
	16	Sam Grimshaw		(substituted on) 69'
	17	Richard Gresty
Manager:
Chris Willcock

GK	19	Christopher Bannon
DF	22	Stuart Donnison
DF	3	John Grey
DF	5	John Parker
DF	6	Kevin Hughes (c)
MF	4	Michael McKeown
MF	10	Ben Richardson	(yellow card) 90+5'
MF	7	Denver Morris
FW	11	Dean Holmes		(substituted off) 69'
FW	17	James Luccock		(substituted off) 59'
MF	19	Gareth Bainbridge		(substituted off) 106'
Substitutes:
	2	Curtis Coppen
	8	Kieran Wrightson		(substituted on) 106'
	12	Marc Lancaster
	14	Adam Forster		(substituted on) 69'
	20	Ryan Carr		(substituted on) 59'
Manager:
Graham Fenton

Man of the match

- Denver Morris

Match officials

- Assistant referees:
  - Wade Norcott (Essex FA)
  - Daniel Cook (Hampshire FA)
- Fourth official: Chris Kavanagh (Manchester FA)

Match rules

- 90 minutes.
- 30 minutes of extra-time if necessary.
- Penalty shoot-out if scores still level.
- Five named substitutes.
- Maximum of three substitutions.
