= 1945–46 Carlisle United F.C. season =

Carlisle United F.C.
1945–46 season
- Manager: Bill Clarke
- Stadium: Brunton Park
- Third Division Northern Section: 8th
- FA Cup: Second Round

For the 1945–46 season, Carlisle United F.C. competed in the Third Division Northern Section.

== Results & fixtures ==
=== Third Division Northern Section ===
==== Selected results ====
Match Day	Date	Opponent	H/A	Score	Carlisle United Scorer(s)	Attendance
1	6 October	Hartlepools United	H	3–1		6,000
2	13 October	Hartlepools United	A	3–2		5,183
3	20 October	Doncaster Rovers	A	?–?		
4		Doncaster Rovers	H	?–?		
5		Darlington	A	?–?		
6		Darlington	H	?–?		
7		York City	A	?–?		
8		York City	H	?–?		

=== FA Cup ===
Round	Date	Opponent	H/A	Score	Carlisle United Scorer(s)	Attendance
R1 L1	17 November	North Shields	H	5–1		
R1 L2	24 November	North Shields	A	3–2		
R2 L1	8 December	Barrow	A	2–4		
R2 L2	15 December	Barrow	H	3–4		
