= Steve Pyle (footballer) =

English footballer

Personal information
- Full name: Stephen Pyle
- Date of birth: 28 September 1963 (age 63)
- Place of birth: North Shields, England
- Positions: Midfielder; forward

Youth career
- Cramlington Juniors
- –1981: Cambridge United

Senior career*
Years	Team	Apps	(Gls)
1981–1985	Cambridge United	69	(8)
1985–1987	Torquay United	33	(5)
1987–1990	Blyth Spartans		
1990–	North Shields		
- Gateshead
- Blyth Spartans
- Whitby Town
–2001	Whitley Bay		

Managerial career
- North Shields
- * Club domestic league appearances and goals

Stephen Pyle (born 28 September 1963) is an English retired professional footballer who played as a midfielder and forward in the Football League for Cambridge United and Torquay United. He later had a long career as a player and manager in non-League football.
