= List of FA Amateur Cup finals =

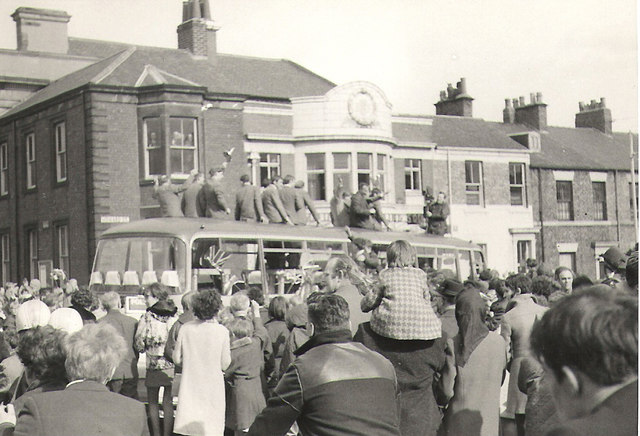
North Shields celebrating their 1969 FA Amateur Cup win

The Football Association Amateur Cup, commonly known as the FA Amateur Cup, was a national knockout cup competition for English amateur football clubs, which was organised by, and named after, the FA (The Football Association). It was staged for the first time in the 1893–94 season, in response to the increasing domination of the sport by professional teams. It was discontinued after the 1973–74 season, when the FA abolished their policy whereby all clubs were officially considered to be either professional or amateur in status. Thereafter, teams which had competed in the Amateur Cup instead either joined the existing FA Trophy or entered the newly created FA Vase.

The competition was staged 71 times and 36 different clubs won the Cup. The first tournament was won by Old Carthusians, who beat Casuals in a match held at the Richmond Athletic Ground. The record for the most wins is held by Bishop Auckland, with ten victories, followed by Clapton and Crook Town with five wins each. The final club to win the tournament was Bishop's Stortford, who defeated Ilford in the 1974 final.

== History ==
The first tournament featured amateur teams from throughout England and was won by Old Carthusians, the team representing former pupils of Charterhouse School, who defeated Casuals. The Carthusians had won England's premier national competition, the FA Cup, in 1881, and thus became the first team to win both cups. The only other club to achieve this feat was Wimbledon, who won the Amateur Cup in 1963 and the FA Cup in 1988. With the exception of a second win for Carthusians and a victory for Old Malvernians, the competition's first decade was dominated by teams from the north-east of the country, including Middlesbrough, Bishop Auckland and Stockton, who each won the competition twice. Southern clubs were the most successful during the inter-war period, winning the tournament 15 times in 19 seasons.

By the start of the Second World War, Bishop Auckland had won the Amateur Cup seven times, and Clapton five times. Interest in the competition peaked soon after the war, and the final was moved to Wembley Stadium, which attracted crowds of up to 100,000. In 1954, Crook Town defeated Bishop Auckland to win the Amateur Cup for the second time, over fifty years after the club's previous victory. The "Bishops" won the final for the next three seasons, the only hat-trick of wins in the competition's history. This took the club's number of wins to 10, a figure that was never surpassed. Crook Town themselves also went on to win the tournament three more times.

In the 1960s, interest in the Amateur Cup declined and crowds for the final dropped to less than half the level of the early Wembley finals. During the last decade of the tournament's existence, Enfield claimed two wins. The last Amateur Cup final was held on 20 April 1974, and Bishop's Stortford became the last tournament winners, defeating Ilford 4–1. In the same year, the FA abandoned its policy of classifying all clubs as either fully professional or fully amateur, and accordingly the Amateur Cup was abolished.

== Finals ==
If the final finished with the scores level after extra time, the teams would play again in a replay at a later date. Penalty shoot-outs were never used. The competition was not staged during the First or Second World Wars, other than in the 1914–15 season. Where the venue is shown in italics, only the town where the final took place is recorded, rather than the name of the specific stadium.

Key
(R)	Replay
(2R)	Second replay
*	Match went to extra time

Results
Season	Winner	Score	Runners–up	Venue	Notes
1893–94	Old Carthusians	2–1	Casuals	Athletic Ground, Richmond	
1894–95	Middlesbrough	2–1	Old Carthusians	Headingley Stadium	
1895–96	Bishop Auckland	1–0	Royal Artillery Portsmouth	Walnut Street, Leicester	
1896–97	Old Carthusians	1–1 *	Stockton	Tufnell Park (Note: Only the town where the final was held is recorded, not the specific stadium name.)	
1896–97 (R)	Old Carthusians	4–1	Stockton	Feethams	
1897–98	Middlesbrough	2–1	Uxbridge	Crystal Palace	
1898–99	Stockton	1–0	Harwich & Parkeston	Linthorpe Road, Middlesbrough	
1899–1900	Bishop Auckland	5–1	Lowestoft Town	Filbert Street	
1900–01	Crook Town	1–1 *	King's Lynn	Dovercourt	
1900–01 (R)	Crook Town	3–0	King's Lynn	Ipswich	
1901–02	Old Malvernians	5–1	Bishop Auckland	Headingley Stadium	
1902–03	Stockton	0–0 *	Oxford City	Reading	
1902–03 (R)	Stockton	1–0	Oxford City	Feethams	
1903–04	Sheffield	3–1	Ealing Association	Valley Parade	
1904–05	West Hartlepool	3–2	Clapton	Shepherd's Bush	
1905–06	Oxford City	3–0	Bishop Auckland	Stockton-on-Tees	
1906–07	Clapton	2–1	Stockton	Stamford Bridge	
1907–08	Depot Bn., Royal Engineers	2–1	Stockton	Bishop Auckland	
1908–09	Clapton	6–0	Eston United	Ilford	
1909–10	RMLI Gosport	2–1	South Bank	Bishop Auckland	
1910–11	Bromley	1–0	Bishop Auckland	ground of West Norwood F.C., Herne Hill	
1911–12	Stockton	0–0 *	Eston United	Ayresome Park	
1911–12 (R)	Stockton	1–0	Eston United	Ayresome Park	
1912–13	South Bank	1–1 *	Oxford City	Elm Park	
1912–13 (R)	South Bank	1–0	Oxford City	Kingsway, Bishop Auckland	
1913–14	Bishop Auckland	1–0	Northern Nomads	Elland Road	
1914–15	Clapton	1–0	Bishop Auckland	The Den	
1919–20	Dulwich Hamlet	1–0	Tufnell Park	The Den	
1920–21	Bishop Auckland	4–2	Swindon Victoria	Ayresome Park	
1921–22	Bishop Auckland	5–2 *	South Bank	Ayresome Park	
1922–23	London Caledonians	2–1	Evesham Town	Crystal Palace	
1923–24	Clapton	3–0	Erith & Belvedere	The Den	
1924–25	Clapton	2–1	Southall	The Den	
1925–26	Northern Nomads	7–1	Stockton	Roker Park	
1926–27	Leyton	3–1	Barking Town	The Den	
1927–28	Leyton	3–2	Cockfield	Ayresome Park	
1928–29	Ilford	3–1	Leyton	Arsenal Stadium	
1929–30	Ilford	5–1	Bournemouth Gasworks Athletic	Boleyn Ground	
1930–31	Wycombe Wanderers	1–0	Hayes	Arsenal Stadium	
1931–32	Dulwich Hamlet	7–1	Marine	Boleyn Ground	
1932–33	Kingstonian	1–1 *	Stockton	Champion Hill	
1932–33 (R)	Kingstonian	4–1	Stockton	Feethams	
1933–34	Dulwich Hamlet	2–1	Leyton	Boleyn Ground	
1934–35	Bishop Auckland	0–0 *	Wimbledon	Ayresome Park	
1934–35 (R)	Bishop Auckland	2–1	Wimbledon	Stamford Bridge	
1935–36	Casuals	1–1 *	Ilford	Selhurst Park	
1935–36 (R)	Casuals	2–0	Ilford	Boleyn Ground	
1936–37	Dulwich Hamlet	2–0	Leyton	Boleyn Ground	
1937–38	Bromley	1–0	Erith & Belvedere	The Den	
1938–39	Bishop Auckland	3–0	Willington	Roker Park	
1945–46	Barnet	3–2	Bishop Auckland	Stamford Bridge	
1946–47	Leytonstone	2–1	Wimbledon	Arsenal Stadium	
1947–48	Leytonstone	1–0	Barnet	Stamford Bridge	
1948–49	Bromley	1–0	Romford	Wembley Stadium	
1949–50	Willington	4–0	Bishop Auckland	Wembley Stadium	
1950–51	Pegasus	2–1	Bishop Auckland	Wembley Stadium	
1951–52	Walthamstow Avenue	2–1	Leyton	Wembley Stadium	
1952–53	Pegasus	6–0	Harwich & Parkeston	Wembley Stadium	
1953–54	Crook Town	2–2 *	Bishop Auckland	Wembley Stadium	
1953–54 (R)	Crook Town	2–2 *	Bishop Auckland	St James' Park	
1953–54 (2R)	Crook Town	1–0	Bishop Auckland	Ayresome Park	
1954–55	Bishop Auckland	2–0	Hendon	Wembley Stadium	
1955–56	Bishop Auckland	1–1 *	Corinthian-Casuals	Wembley Stadium	
1955–56 (R)	Bishop Auckland	4–1	Corinthian-Casuals	Ayresome Park	
1956–57	Bishop Auckland	3–1	Wycombe Wanderers	Wembley Stadium	
1957–58	Woking	3–0	Ilford	Wembley Stadium	
1958–59	Crook Town	3–2	Barnet	Wembley Stadium	
1959–60	Hendon	2–1	Kingstonian	Wembley Stadium	
1960–61	Walthamstow Avenue	2–1	West Auckland Town	Wembley Stadium	
1961–62	Crook Town	1–1 *	Hounslow Town	Wembley Stadium	
1961–62 (R)	Crook Town	4–0	Hounslow Town	Ayresome Park	
1962–63	Wimbledon	4–2	Sutton United	Wembley Stadium	
1963–64	Crook Town	2–1	Enfield	Wembley Stadium	
1964–65	Hendon	3–1	Whitby Town	Wembley Stadium	
1965–66	Wealdstone	3–1	Hendon	Wembley Stadium	
1966–67	Enfield	0–0 *	Skelmersdale United	Wembley Stadium	
1966–67 (R)	Enfield	3–0	Skelmersdale United	Maine Road	
1967–68	Leytonstone	1–0	Chesham United	Wembley Stadium	
1968–69	North Shields	2–1	Sutton United	Wembley Stadium	
1969–70	Enfield	5–1	Dagenham	Wembley Stadium	
1970–71	Skelmersdale United	4–1	Dagenham	Wembley Stadium	
1971–72	Hendon	2–0	Enfield	Wembley Stadium	
1972–73	Walton & Hersham	1–0	Slough Town	Wembley Stadium	
1973–74	Bishop's Stortford	4–1	Ilford	Wembley Stadium	

== Wins by team ==
Wins by team
Wins	Club	Years
10	Bishop Auckland	1896, 1900, 1914, 1921, 1922, 1935, 1939, 1955, 1956, 1957
5	Clapton	1907, 1909, 1915, 1924, 1925
5	Crook Town	1901, 1954, 1959, 1962, 1964
4	Dulwich Hamlet	1920, 1932, 1934, 1937
3	Bromley	1911, 1938, 1949
3	Hendon	1960, 1965, 1972
3	Leytonstone	1947, 1948, 1968
3	Stockton	1899, 1903, 1912
2	Enfield	1967, 1970
2	Ilford	1929, 1930
2	Leyton	1927, 1928
2	Middlesbrough	1895, 1898
2	Old Carthusians	1894, 1897
2	Pegasus	1951, 1953
2	Walthamstow Avenue	1952, 1961
1	Barnet	1946
1	Bishop's Stortford	1974
1	Casuals	1936
1	Depot Bn., Royal Engineers	1908
1	Kingstonian	1933
1	London Caledonians	1923
1	North Shields	1969
1	Northern Nomads	1926
1	Old Malvernians	1902
1	Oxford City	1906
1	RMLI Gosport	1910
1	Sheffield	1904
1	Skelmersdale United	1971
1	South Bank	1913
1	Walton & Hersham	1973
1	Wealdstone	1966
1	West Hartlepool	1905
1	Willington	1950
1	Wimbledon	1963
1	Woking	1958
1	Wycombe Wanderers	1931
