= Alan Grenyer =

English footballer

Personal information
- Date of birth: 31 August 1892
- Place of birth: North Shields, England
- Date of death: 1953 (aged 60–61)
- Height: 6 ft 0 in (1.83 m)
- Position: Left half

Senior career*
Years	Team	Apps	(Gls)
	North Shields Athletic	?	(?)
1910–1922	Everton	142	(9)
1924–1928	South Shields	41	(5)
Total		183	(14)
- * Club domestic league appearances and goals

Alan Grenyer (31 August 1892 – 1953) was an English footballer who played in The Football League for Everton and South Shields. He also played for North Shields Athletic.
