= Tommy Lumley =

English footballer

Personal information
- Full name: Ilderton Thomas Lumley
- Date of birth: 9 December 1924
- Place of birth: Consett, County Durham, England
- Date of death: 17 December 2009 (aged 85)
- Height: 1.68 m (5 ft 6 in)
- Position: Inside forward

Senior career*
Years	Team	Apps	(Gls)
1947–1948	Consett	?	(?)
1948–1951	Charlton Athletic	37	(10)
1951–1956	Barnsley	146	(36)
1956–1957	Darlington	15	(3)
1957–1958	Consett		
Total		198	(49)
- * Club domestic league appearances and goals

Ilderton Thomas Lumley (9 December 1924 – 17 December 2009) was an English footballer who played as an inside forward in the Football League.
