= Mortimer Community College =

Location
- Reading Road; South Shields, South Tyneside, NE33 4UG; England
- Coordinates: 54.9813°N 1.4276°W

Information
- Type: Community school
- Local authority: South Tyneside
- Department for Education URN: 108727 Tables
- Ofsted: Reports
- Headteacher: Simon Hignett
- Gender: Coeducational
- Age: 11 to 16
- Enrolment: 1500
- Website: http://www.mortimercommunitycollege.co.uk/

Mortimer Community College is a coeducational secondary school in South Shields, South Tyneside, England. It takes pupils from the age of 11 to 16. It is a specialist Arts and Sports College.

The school teamed up with the National Glass Centre for a project to design a large glass mural for the foyer of the school. The glass mural was unveiled by David Miliband, then the UK Foreign Secretary, on 19 March 2010.

== Notable former pupils and staff ==
- Perrie Edwards - Member of the band Little Mix
- Sarah Millican - Comedian
- Chris Cook - Olympic swimmer
- Steve Simonsen - Professional goalkeeper
- Katy McLean - Rugby Union player for England
- John Barbour - inventor and manufacturer of the Barbour jacket
- Jason Ainsley - Spennymoor manager
