= Consett A.F.C. =

Association football club in England

Coordinates: 54.850281°N 1.8237868°W

Consett
- Full name: Consett Association Football Club
- Nickname: The Steelmen
- Founded: 1899; 127 years ago
- Ground: Belle View Stadium, Consett
- Capacity: 3,770 (250 seated)
- Chairman: Frank Bell
- Manager: Jason Miller
- League: Northern Premier League Division One East
- 2025–26: Northern Premier League Division One East, 10th of 22
- Website: consettafc.com
Home colours	Away colours

Consett Association Football Club is a football club based in Consett in County Durham, England. They are currently members of the Northern Premier League Division One East and play at Belle View Stadium.

== History ==
The club was established on 1 July 1899 as Consett Celtic. They joined the Northern Alliance in 1919, and were renamed Consett in 1922. They finished bottom of the league in 1922–23, but were runners-up in 1925–26. At the end of the season all the clubs in the league joined the North Eastern League as members of the new Division Two. They were the first Division Two champions in 1926–27, earning promotion to Division One. However, after finishing second-from-bottom of Division One in 1930–31, they were relegated back to Division Two.

In 1932–33 Consett were Division Two runners-up and were promoted to Division One. After finishing second-from-bottom of Division One in 1934–35, they left to return the Northern Alliance, which had been re-established. However, after two seasons in the Northern Alliance, they rejoined the North Easter League, which was now running with a single division. When the league was suspended in 1939 following the outbreak of World War II, a competition was run with ten clubs, which Consett won. In 1946–47 they finished seventh in the league and subsequently applied for election to the Football League. However, no vote took place and the four clubs up for re-election retained their places in the Football League. The club went on to win the League Cup in 1950–51 and 1953–54.

When the North Eastern League was disbanded in 1958, Consett spent the 1958–59 and 1959–60 seasons in the Midland League, also reaching the first round of the FA Cup for the first time in 1958–59, losing 5–0 at Doncaster Rovers. In 1960 they were founder members of the Northern Counties League; the club were champions in 1961–62, and the league was renamed the North Eastern League in 1962. They finished bottom of the league in 1963–64, with the league disbanded at the end of the season. The club subsequently joined the Wearside League, They were runners-up in 1968–69 and 1969–70, after which the club joined the Northern League. In 1976–77 they finished joint top of the table with Spennymoor United, but lost the championship play-off 3–0 in a match played at Willington. They were later relegated to Division Two after finishing bottom of Division One in 1987–88.

The 1988–89 season saw Consett win Division Two at the first attempt, earning an immediate return to Division One. They won the League Cup in 1994–95 with a 2–0 win over Whitby Town in the final, and in 1996–97 the club reached the first round of the FA Cup for a second time, losing 4–0 at Mansfield Town. The early 2000s saw the club yo-yo between the divisions, as they were relegated in 2002–03, promoted in 2003–04, relegated again in 2004–05 and promoted again in 2005–06 after winning Division Two. They went on to finish as Division One runners-up in 2007–08, 2008–09 and again in 2010–11. In 2019–20 the club reached the final of the FA Vase, losing 3–2 to Hebburn Town in a match that was delayed until May 2021 due to the COVID-19 pandemic. In the 2021–22 season they were runners-up in Division One, qualifying for an inter-step play-off against Histon from the level above, which they won 2–1 to earn promotion to Division One East the Northern Premier League.

== Ground ==
The club originally played at Vicarage Field, which was owned by the Consett Iron Company. Spectator facilities were restricted to a small stand, with an army hut used for changing rooms. However, in 1948 the site was needed for expansion of the steelworks. They spent two seasons at Eden Colliery Welfare's Leadgate ground before returning to Consett to play at the new Belle Vue Park ground on Ashdale Road. Built largely by volunteers, the new ground had banking around the pitch made from mine workings, with two stands erected, one of which was paid for by the £1,150 transfer fee received from Charlton Athletic for Tommy Lumley. The first match at Belle Vue Park was played in August 1950, attracting a record attendance of 7,000 to see a game against Sunderland reserves. One of the stands was later closed, although the steel structure was left in place. The remaining stand consisted of covered bench seating and a small terraced area in front.

The club played at Belle Vue Park until 2013. They moved to a new ground on Delves Lane, named Belle View Stadium; the new ground included an artificial pitch after the 2012–13 season had seen 18 matches at Belle Vue Park postponed due to the weather. The first match was played on 22 November, with Newcastle United the visitors; a crowd of 3,054 saw Newcastle win 2–1. The Belle Vue site was later used to build Consett Academy.

== Honours ==
- Northern League
  - Division Two champions 1988–89, 2005–06
  - Challenge Cup winners 1994–95
- North Eastern League
  - Champions 1939–40
  - Division Two champions 1926–27
  - League Cup winners 1950–51, 1953–54
- Northern Counties League
  - Champions 1961–62
- Sunderland Shipowners Cup
  - Winners 1967–68
- Sunderland Shipowners Centenary Cup
  - Winners 1997–98
- Monkwearmouth Charity Cup
  - Winners 1967–68
- Durham Challenge Cup
  - Winners 1947–48, 1949–50, 1958–59, 1960–61, 1968–69, 2006–07, 2017–18

== Records ==
- Best FA Cup performance: First round, 1958–59, 1996–97
- Best FA Trophy performance: Second round, 1978–79
- Best FA Vase performance: Runners-up 2019–20
- Record attendance:
  - At the original Belle Vue Park: 7,000 vs Sunderland reserves, August 1950

== See also ==
- Consett A.F.C. players
- Consett A.F.C. managers
