= 1893–94 FA Amateur Cup =

Football Association Amateur Cup

Tournament details
- Country: England; Wales

Final positions
- Champions: Old Carthusians
- Runners-up: Casuals
- Semifinalists: Bishop Auckland; Sherwood Foresters

The 1893–94 FA Amateur Cup was the first season of the FA Amateur Cup, an annual football competition for teams outside the professional leagues.

Old Carthusians won the competition, beating Casuals in the final.

== Quarter-finals ==
Home team	Score	Away team
Bishop Auckland	3–1	Shrewsbury Town
Casuals	W/O	Chirk

Home team	Score	Away team
Old Carthusians	4–1	Great Marlow
Old Etonians	2–5	Sherwood Foresters

== Semi-finals ==
Home team	Score	Away team
Sherwood Foresters	0–1	Casuals

Home team	Score	Away team
Old Carthusians	5–1	Bishop Auckland

== Final ==
7 April 1894

Old Carthusians	2–1	Casuals

Athletic Ground, Richmond
