= North Shields F.C. =

Association football club in England

North Shields
- Full name: North Shields Football Club
- Nickname: The Robins
- Founded: 1896; 130 years ago (as North Shields Athletic)
- Ground: Daren Persson Stadium @ Ralph Gardner Park; North Shields
- Capacity: 1,500
- Coordinates: 55°0′19″N 1°27′33″W
- Chairman: Dennis Scarth
- Manager: Brian Smith
- League: Northern League Division 1
- 2025–26: Northern League Division One, 8th of 19
- Website: Official website
Home colours	Away colours

North Shields Football Club is a football club based in North Shields, Tyne and Wear, England. They have reached the 2nd round of the FA Cup twice in their history: in 1933–34 and 1982–83. Following their promotion from Northern League Division Two, they achieved promotion to Northern League Division One from which they were promoted from in 2022 as Champions to the Northern Premier League Division One East. They also won the FA Amateur Cup at Wembley in 1969, beating Sutton United. During the 2014–15 season, North Shields repeated their 1969 success by defeating Glossop North End 2-1 AET at Wembley in the final of the FA Vase.

== History ==
=== North Shields Athletic 1896–1915 ===
The club was formed in 1896 as North Shields Athletic playing initially in the South Shields and District League. They subsequently became members of the Northern Combination and were runners-up of this league in the 1900–01 season. The club moved to the Appleby Park ground at Hawkey's Lane, North Shields around 1900.

After eight seasons as a Northern Combination club, in 1904 North Shields Athletic joined the Northern Alliance. They soon were successful, winning the league for two successive seasons in 1906–07 and 1907–08. Following this the team were admitted to the North Eastern League and North Shields Athletic remained members until 1914–15 when competition was suspended owing to the First World War. At least two players, Alan Grenyer and Harry Chambers went on to play for the full England team after starting their careers with North Shields Athletic.

=== Preston Colliery 1919–1928 ===
After the First World War the club emerged as Preston Colliery and upon resumption of football played the 1919–20 season in the Tyneside League. The following season they competed in the Northern Alliance and from 1921 they were re-admitted to the North Eastern League. Success proved elusive for the Preston Colliery team and after a next to bottom finish to the 1927–28 campaign they were relegated to Division 2 (which had been formed a few seasons earlier by absorbing the clubs' previous league, the Northern Alliance).

=== North Shields 1928–1992 ===
The club became North Shields F.C. at the start of the 1928–29 season and were immediately divisional champions and promoted back to Division 1 of the North Eastern League where they remained playing (except for a seven-year suspension of the league caused by the Second World War) until 1958.

North Shields achieved their best to date performance in the FA Cup in reaching the second round proper in 1933–34 (this feat was not equalled for forty-nine years). In the first round Shields defeated Midland League Scarborough 3–0 at Appleby Park. They were drawn away in the next round to local rivals Football League Third Division North club Gateshead who won the tie, 1–0.

A few years prior to the war-time cessation, in 1936 the club saw their record attendance at Appleby Park of 12,800 in a local derby match against South Shields. In 1944–45 following the post war resumption of the league Shields won the league cup. Shortly afterwards in 1949–50 the team won the North Eastern League championship, achieved a second-placed finish in 1951–52 and took the League Cup winners crown again five years later. That season, 1956–57, was to be temporarily their penultimate as members of the North Eastern League as that league disbanded after the 1957–58 campaign.

The disbandment was caused by the withdrawal of Football League clubs' reserve teams - a fate that also befell the Midland League. The remaining teams from both leagues combined into a single Midland League. North Shields were runners-up of this grouping in 1959–60 (by three points to Peterborough United who were elected to the Football League for the following season).

This league arrangement was short-lived and from 1960 the north-eastern teams organised themselves into a ten-team Northern Counties League. North Shields were champions of this league in its inaugural 1960–61 season. The league was renamed the North Eastern League in 1962 but only survived a further two seasons.

Upon the folding of that league, North Shields joined the Northern League from the 1964–65 campaign and shortly thereafter achieved success. A year after joining they were runners-up and three years later with former Scotland defender Frank Brennan as manager North Shields recorded a unique quadruple in 1968–69 of league winners, league cup winners, FA Amateur Cup winners and joint winners of the Anglo Italian Amateur Cup (after an aggregate draw over two legs against Italian Amateur cup winners Almas).

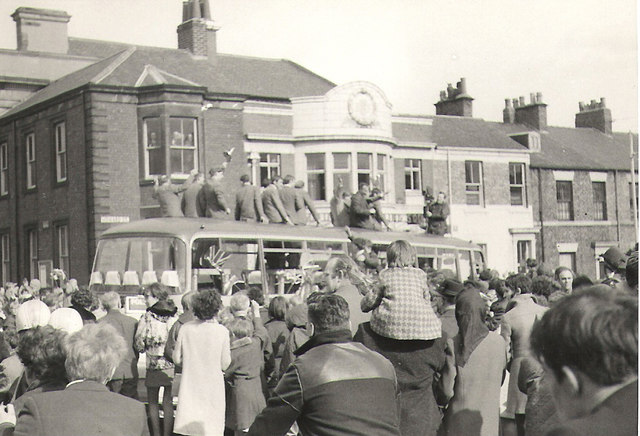
The team celebrating their 1969 FA Amateur Cup win

The FA Amateur Cup was the highest ranked nationwide cup competition for amateur clubs and in the 1968–69 final North Shields beat Isthmian League club Sutton United in front of 47,000 spectators at Wembley Stadium. Shields were a goal down after only four minutes but won 2–1 with second half strikes from Richie Hall and Brian Joicey, both laid on by substitute Tommy Orrick a local shipyard worker.

North Shields continued in the Northern League until 1989, winning the league cup in 1971–72 and were league runners-up in 1983–84. "The Robins" achieved their best post-war FA Cup performance in 1982 progressing for the second time in their history to the second round proper. They won 1–0 at fourth division League club Halifax Town in the first round, Bede McCaffrey scoring the all-important goal. It was Shields first (and only to date) FA Cup victory over a Football League club. Third division league club Walsall were the visitors to Appleby Park in the second round and left with a 3–0 victory.

During the late 1970s, the whole structure of Non-League football was changing. North Shields had been an amateur club however in 1974 the Football Association had abolished the distinction between amateur and professional players. 1979 saw the creation of the Alliance Premier League at the head of a national pyramid structure with, from 1987, automatic promotion to the Football League. The Northern League remained outside of the pyramid structure and gradually lost its status to the Northern Premier League which was a direct feeder league to the Alliance. Indeed, the Northern Counties East League which was founded in 1982 to be part of the pyramid structure (and a feeder to the Northern Premier League) was becoming an alternative rival to the independent Northern League.

North Shields stepped into the integrated leagues in 1989 joining the Premier Division of the Northern Counties East League. Shields immediately made their mark with runners-up position in 1989-90 and again in 1990–91. These achievements were surpassed over the 1991–92 season with the winning of the Northern Counties East League championship and cup double. Under the managership of Colin Richardson the Robins claimed the number one spot (finishing 24 points clear over runners up Sutton Town) and the prize of promotion up the non-league pyramid to the second tier of the Northern Premier League.

But behind the scenes all was not well, with Director Chris Wynne claiming repayment of £98,000 debt. The club under financial administration set about selling its Appleby Park ground to settle the debt and fund a ground-sharing arrangement with Whitley Bay. However, insufficient funds were realised for the latter and with no ground on which to play Shields' membership of the Northern Premier League was terminated. It looked like the end of North Shields FC until a new company North Shields (1992) Ltd was formed with local councillors, business leaders and a couple of members of Geordie folk rock band Lindisfarne supporting it.

=== North Shields FC 1992– ===
Despite it being a couple of weeks after the start of competition, North Shields were accepted into Division 2 of the Wearside League - a drop of 5 levels down the football pyramid. Former player Dave Callaghan became the manager and put a new team together. The club's stay at this level was short-lived, earning promotion - as 1992–93 division 2 runners-up - to Division 1 of the Wearside league. Initially the club played at their Appleby Park ground but after a few months relocated to groundshare with Percy Main Amateurs at St John's Green, Percy Main, until the end of the season and thence for a couple of years from 1993 to 1994 on to Swallow Sports Ground, Wallsend. Thereafter, the club relocated back to North Shields to the Ralph Gardner Park which has since been developed into a 1,500-capacity stadium.

For four years in the late nineties (1995 to 1999), the club adopted the name of their forerunners, North Shields Athletic and under this name were Wearside League champions in 1998–99. The club name reverted to North Shields FC in 1999 and success continued with Wearside League runners-up and two league championships in the four seasons to 2003–04.

Following these successes the club rejoined, after a 15-year absence, the Northern League at division 2 level. The team endured a run of lower table finishes until Anthony Woodhouse arrived as player-manager in 2009 from local rivals Whitley Bay. In his second full season the club finished 4th. After a series of top eight finishes he was replaced in April 2012 by former Blackburn Rovers and Aston Villa player Graham Fenton.

Two years later in 2014, North Shields F.C. clinched promotion to the Northern League First Division by winning the Northern League Second Division Championship - clinching the title with a 3–1 win at rivals South Shields. A then record attendance at their current ground of 1,312 was established at the Good Friday game in their final home game of the season against West Allotment Celtic - who were also promoted that season. Shields received the trophy after a 3–0 win.

Shields scored 141 goals, with a goal difference of +108 and 100 points. Gareth Bainbridge was the leading scorer with 55 goals, 47 of these in the league, a total greater than any other Northern League player. He was rewarded with the Northern League Player of the Year Award for 2013–14.

Success on a national level followed the next season when "the Robins" won the 2014–15 FA Vase beating champions of the North West Counties League, Glossop North End. The final took place at Wembley Stadium and similar to the North Shields Amateur Cup triumph 46 years previously they came from a goal down to win 2-1 (after extra time) with Gareth Bainbridge and Adam Forster scoring. Along the way, a new attendance record of 1,500 was established at the Shields' Ralph Gardner Park stadium at the semi-final second leg match against Highworth Town in which the Shields triumphed 2–0. They also finished 4th in the Northern League First Division and only five points behind champions Marske United.

Success on a regional level followed the next season when "the Robins" won the Northumberland Senior Cup beating Northern Premier League Premier Division, Blyth Spartans AFC. Northumberland Senior Cup final took place at St James' Park. There was a lot of build up to the game with favourites and holders Blyth Spartans who play in a higher league than North Shields looking to grab some silverware after missing out on promotion this season. The game ended 4–3 to North Shields adding another piece of silverware to their impressive collection. Goals came from Gary Ormston, 2 impressive goals from Gareth Bainbridge and with the scores at 3-3, Ryan Carr came up with the goods with a thunderbolt into the top corner sparking pandemonium on and off the field. The Robins comfortably wound down the remaining seconds, and Kevin Hughes lifted the cup for the thirteenth time in the club's history. The game attracted a crowd of 2321 with a healthy contingent from North Shields. They also finished 5th in the Northern League First Division and 24 points behind champions Shildon AFC. Also only 5 points from 3rd place with Morpeth Town AFC and Guisborough Town being level on 77 points.

Manager Graham Fenton left the club in September 2016 to join South Shields, with Jon McDonald replacing him as manager. McDonald kept North Shields at the top until early April, losing out to South Shields in the title race. North Shields also lost the Senior Cup to Blyth and the League Cup to South Shields after which Jon McDonald left the club.

Shields moved to appoint Assistant Manager, Brian Smith as the new Manager, with Gary Ormston stepping up as Assistant and Andy Gowans joining the coaching set up alongside Wilf Keilty. Brian Smith left the club in February 2018 to be replaced by ex-Whitley Bay boss Marc Nash.

Nash brought with him Anthony Woodhouse, who was welcomed back to his old stamping ground as assistant. The duo marked their debut in charge with a sensational 6–5 victory over Jarrow Roofing after the Robins were trailing 5-2 late in the game. With Steve Swinyard coming in as coach the new management team guided the club to a final 8th position as the season closed.

The campaign of 2019–2020 before halted due to the COVID-19 pandemic, the side saw an impressive 4th-placed finish with games in hand on the teams above. The team scored 56 goals only conceding 37. The following season (20–21) was another curtailed with the Shieldsmen again in a strong 4th position with 26 points from 11 games having lost only once as well as enjoying a decent FA Vase run including a penalty shoot-out success at Bridlington Town. Ultimately, three clubs were promoted that year on a points per game basis combined over 2 seasons – the Robins missing out by the narrowest of margins.

However, Marc Nash's men were to make no mistake in an unforgettable 2021–2022 campaign cruising to the Northern League First Division title by 9 points – their first such triumph since 1969. The management team challenged the players to respond after the disappointment of a quarter-final loss in the Vase after a marathon 8 match adventure featuring 3 penalty shoot-out victories. The Robins' clinched the Championship and promotion to the Northern Premier League East with a 3–1 triumph at Whitley Bay sparking emotional celebrations. Shields won 25 and drew 9 of their 38 games – overcoming an 11-point deficit behind Consett at one stage and having to play their last 6 matches all away. Centre forward Dan Wilson ended the season as the League's joint top scorer with 29 goals plus 11 in cup ties. "There's so much pride in what we have achieved as a club" commented a beaming boss Marc Nash.

The 2022–23 season saw North Shields finish in seventh position. Despite this, the club were Demoted having failed to prove to the FA that they could provide the stipulated ground improvements. Off the pitch problems continued into the 2023–24 season. In December 2023, Sean Mulligan and Sean Redford took the reins as co-chairmen to provide further stability to the club, the club confirmed that in order to prevent the club from going out of existence, all players and management were to leave the club with immediate effect. Brian Smith was immediately appointed as first team manager as he returned to the club. Brian and the club have built a brand new team with some great experience and a great link up with South Shields FC, North Shields Juniors & Athletic as well as New Hartley Juniors.

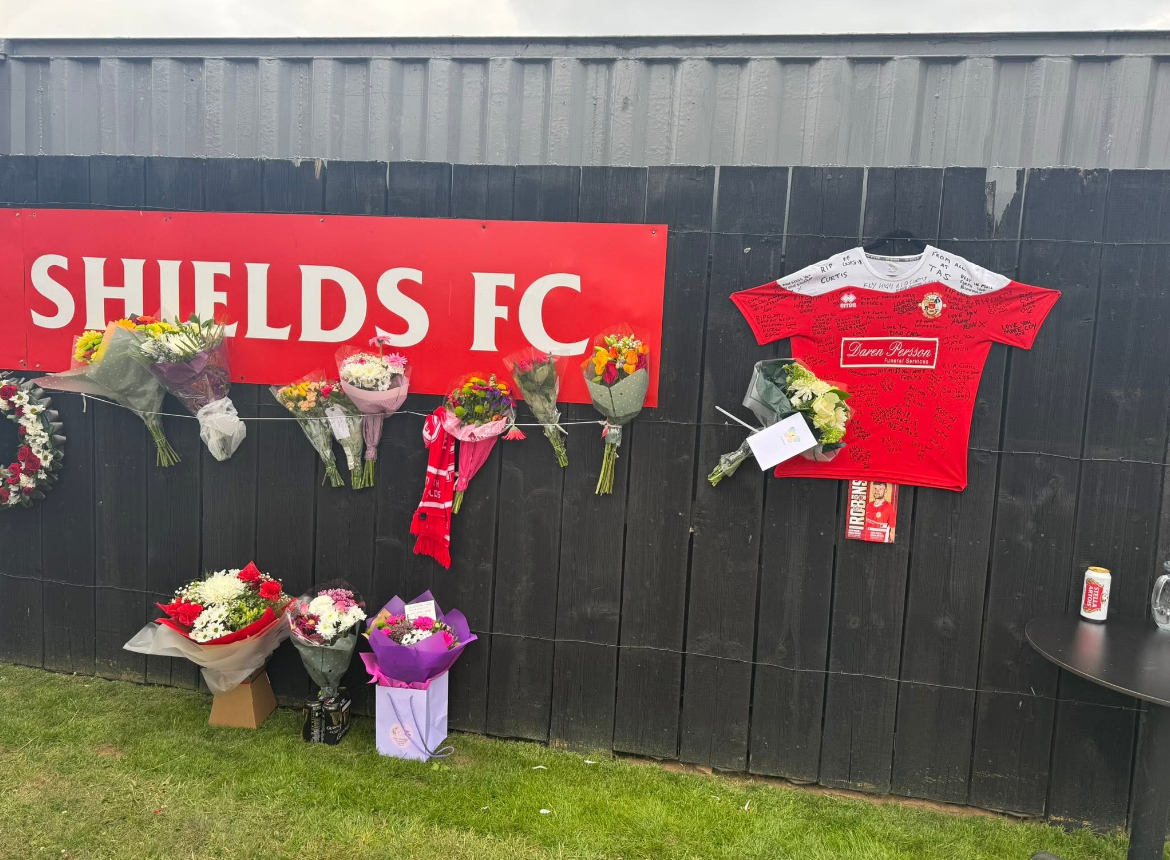
Curtis Coppen tribute outside Ralph Gardner Park

In 2025 North Shields lost a key member of their squad as longtime defender of the club Curtis Coppen died at the age of 30, Coppen had 3 different spells with North Shields most famously in the 2014–15 FA Vase winning team; however he was not selected for the final, tributes for Coppen remain outside the ground.

=== Reforming of the club ===
The twists and turns of North Shields' history continued right up to the start of the new 1992–93 season and beyond. The mishandling of the club over the previous couple of years has been well documented, and culminated in the appointment of an administrator by club director Chris Wynne, who was claiming repayment of a debt of some £98,000. The administrator moved in with the brief of resolving the creditors’ situation, and endeavoring to ensure the continuance of football in North Shields. Wynne's co-director Vic Halom was removed from his post as general manager of the club and hopes were high that the Robins would soon be put on an even keel.

The players were managed by Colin Richardson. North Shields gained promotion to the HFS Loans league after winning the Northern Counties East League Premier Division title, finishing 24 points ahead of runners-up Sutton Town. North Shields also won the League Challenge Cup, defeating Armthorpe Welfare FC 5–0 in the final, and the Presidents Cup, while reaching the final of the Northumberland Senior Cup.

It became clear that North Shield's ground, Appleby Park (pictured right), would have to be sold to repay creditors, and the administrators negotiated a ground-sharing agreement with Whitley Bay, which met with the approval of HFS Loans League officials. The future of North Shields looked bright, as manager Colin Richardson prepared his squad for the challenge of their higher status, winning their first three pre-season friendlies, including a 4–1 demolition of a strong Sunderland AFC side which included several of their FA Cup final line-up.

Suddenly, players and officials were hit by the news that a sudden reduction in the valuation of the Appleby Park site meant that insufficient cash would be released to repay creditors in full, and as a result, the administrators were unable to make the agreed ground-share payment of £35,000 to Whitley Bay. Furthermore, it looked inevitable that North Shields Association Football Club Limited would go into liquidation. A group of interested people attempted to re-negotiate the ground share terms with Whitley Bay without success. With no ground on which to play, North Shields membership of the HFS Loans League was terminated a little over a week before the season got underway, with the Robins scheduled to journey to Workington FC.

It certainly seemed so, with the administrator releasing the playing squad from their contracts. Many of them were very quickly snapped up by other clubs. Former boss Colin Richardson, who had taken over as manager at HFS Loans League First Division club Bridlington Town FC, acquired Ian Mckenzie, Dave Woodcock, Ged Parkinson, Graeme Jones and Justin Robson with Neil Howie becoming the latest to join after having brief spells with Gateshead FC and Blyth Spartans AFC. Steve Pyle joined Blyth Spartans AFC after originally signing for Gateshead FC, Gary Nicholson and Barrie Wardrobe joined Guiseley and Dunston Federation signed Martin Hamilton and Graham Mole.

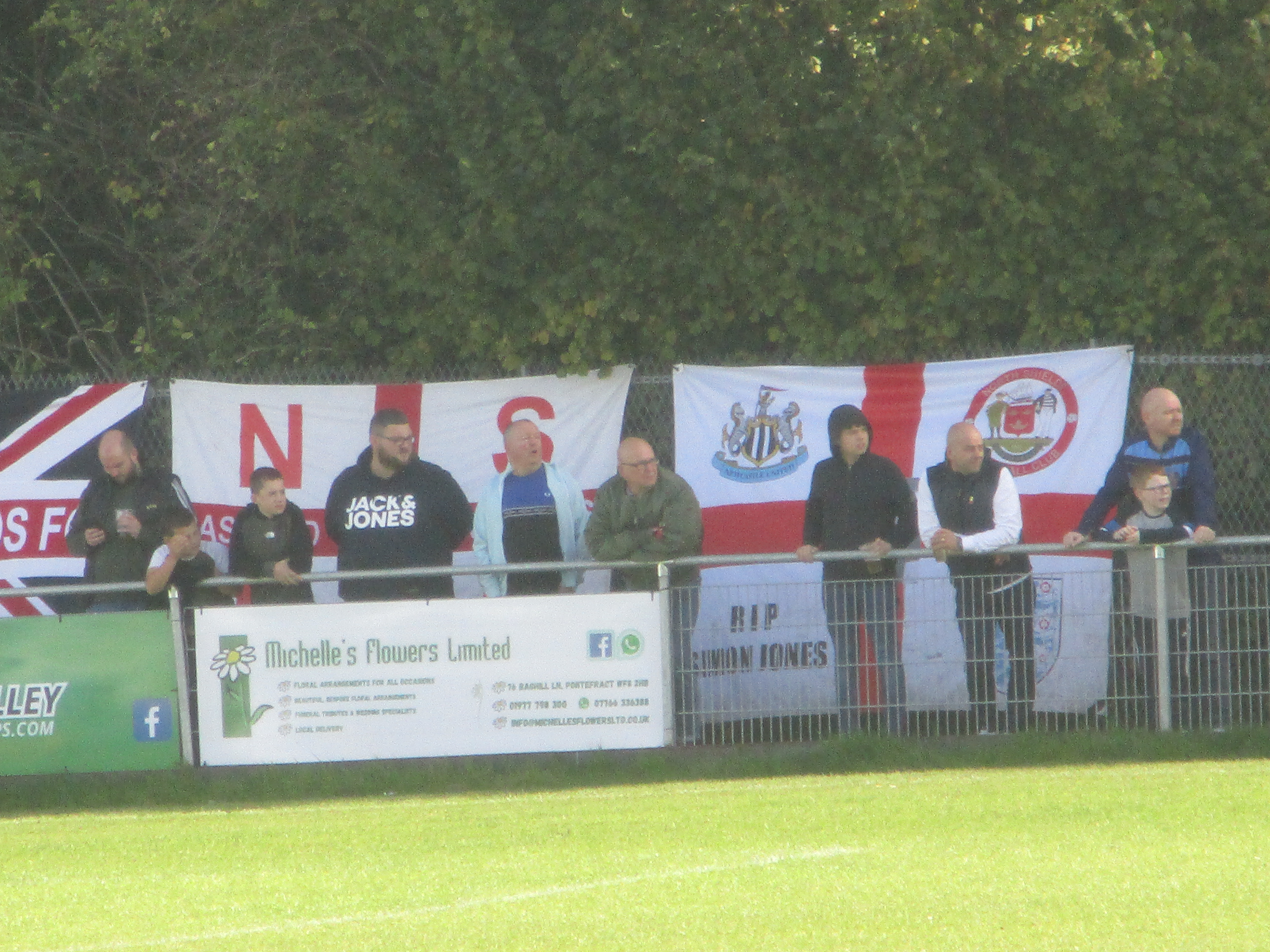
North Shields supporters at Pontefract Collieries F.C. in 2022.

The end it might have seemed, but a small group of people would not accept that situation and swiftly formed a new company, North Shields FC (1992) Limited, in order to save North Shields. It seemed a tall order, but a new, strong board was assembled. The new chairman was to be Richard Slade, president of the North Shields Chamber of Trade & Commerce. Two members of the Geordie rock band Lindisfarne joined the board, Alan Hull and drummer Ray Laidlaw, who became Press Officer, whilst two North Tyneside Councillors, Frank Lott and David Corkey were ‘signed up’, and at the time the board of the new company was twelve strong.

An approach was made to the Vaux Wearside League, seeking immediate admission to their Second Division, and on Tuesday 1 September, a couple of weeks after the campaign had got underway, North Shields were elected on a majority vote. The club had been given the go-ahead to play at Appleby Park for the time being, whilst the new ground was developed and the first match in the VAUX Wearside League was on Saturday, 19 September. The new manager was Dave Callaghan, a stalwart of North Shields team for the past two years, who was assisted by his twin brother Tommy. The club were determined that before long the name of North Shields would once again be to the forefront of North East-non league football.

== Players ==
As of 24 February 2025.

Note: Flags indicate national team as defined under FIFA eligibility rules; some limited exceptions apply. Players may hold more than one non-FIFA nationality.

No.	Pos.	Nation	Player
—	GK		Alex Curran
—	GK		Callum Elliott
—	DF		Blair Adams
—	DF		Euan Anderson
—	DF		Nick Cassidy
—	DF		Flynn Williamson
—	DF		Ben Harmison
—	DF		Liam Marrs
—	MF		Ryan Carr
—	MF		Kyle Downey
—	MF		Adam Forster
—	MF		Matty Nelson

No.	Pos.	Nation	Player
—	MF		Dean Holmes
—	MF		Callum Ross
—	MF		Reece Wanless
—	FW		Stephen Hall
—	FW		Jordan Lashley
—	FW		Lee Mason
—	FW		Nelson Ogbewe
—	FW		Regan Paterson
—	FW		Brandon Slater
—	FW		Lewis Suddick
—	FW		Dan Waldon

== Team management ==
=== Current backroom staff ===
==== First Team ====
As of 1 January 2025

Name	Role
(England) Brian Smith	Manager
(England) Steve Cuggy	Assistant manager
(England) Andy Bowman	First Team Coach
(England) Sean McCafferty	Goalkeeping Coach
(England) Bree Nessling	Physiotherapist
(England) Bob Scott	Coach

== Management Committee ==
- Chairman / Treasurer: Dennis Scarth
- Vice Chairman: Lindsey Coulthard
- Club Secretary: Chris Lowther
- Digital Solutions Manager: Gary Williamson
- Commercial Manager: Steve Cherry
- Head of Media / Welfare Officer: Sean Mulligan
- Stadium Manager: Anthony Reed
- Hospitality Manager: Sam Cave

== Volunteers ==
- Kitman: Terry Reed
- Kitman: Paul Reed
- Official Club Photographer: Chris Chambers
- Videographer: Joe Kenja
- Videographer Apprentice: Thomas Williamson
- Media: Dom Ilderton
- Media: Felix Cox
- Volunteer: Mick Woodhouse
- Volunteer: Gordon Barlow
- Volunteer: Joe Cave

== Honorary ==
- President: Malcolm Macdonald
- Vice President & Volunteer: Trevor Campbell

== Records ==
=== Attendances ===
- Record Attendance, (Appleby Park) – 13,000 (v. South Shields FC 1936)
- Record Attendance, ( Ralph Gardner Park) – 1,500 (v. Highworth Town FC – FA Vase Trophy Semi-Final, 28 March 2015)

=== Results ===
- Record Win – 13-2 (v. Newbiggin AFC 1965 - Northumberland Aged Miners Homes Cup QF)
- Record Defeat – 0-16 (v. Marske United FC 1994 - Wearside League)
- Most goals in a game – 7, Andy Hay (v. Harton & Westoe 2001 - Wearside League)

=== Cup records ===
- Best FA Cup performance: 2nd round, 1933–34, 1982–83
- Best FA Trophy performance: 2nd round, 1983–84
- Best FA Vase performance: Champions, 2014–15
- Best FA Amateur Cup performance: Champions, 1968–69

== Stadium ==
Appleby Park

North Shields Athletic moved to Appleby Park in 1900 and developed the stadium on Hawkey's Lane into one of the finest non league stadiums in the country. The 1969 Amateur Cup Final Programme notes that "Appleby Park is one of the finest grounds in amateur soccer with accommodation for 15,000, dressing-rooms of Football League standard, and a thriving social club." The ground record attendance was 12,800 watching the local derby with South Shields in 1936. The ground was one of the finest non-league stadiums in the country and disputedly the fourth best in the North East after St James', Roker and Ayresome Park.

The stadium was blighted with subsidence problems having been built on the site of a former colliery and it wasn't uncommon for holes to appear in the pitch, one of which developed during the course of a game and resulted in a home player ending up waist high in a hole!

North Shields played at Appleby Park until 1992 after the club encountered financial difficulties and subsidence at the ground forced the club into selling the land. The stadium was eventually sold to developers and by 1993 the stadium was replaced by new housing. The site is now replaced with a street named after the old stadium, Appleby Park.

St John's Green, Percy Main

The 1992–93 programme records this as being the home ground of the club. This is the current ground of Percy Main Amateurs F.C.

Swallow Sports Ground, Wallsend

The 1993–94 programme records this as being the home ground of the club. The ground was on Kings Road in Wallsend.

Ralph Gardner Park:

After 2 years of playing at various grounds around the Wallsend area the club finally reached an agreement with North Tyneside Council and a new ground known as "Ralph Gardner Park" was built in the Chirton area of North Shields. 2010–11 saw the commencement of a sponsorship deal with local funeral director Daren Persson which has seen the stadium carry his name. The stadium is affectionately known as "The Morgue" to the North Shields "Ultras" supporters. Attendances at "RGP" has been known to pass the 300 mark on occasions.

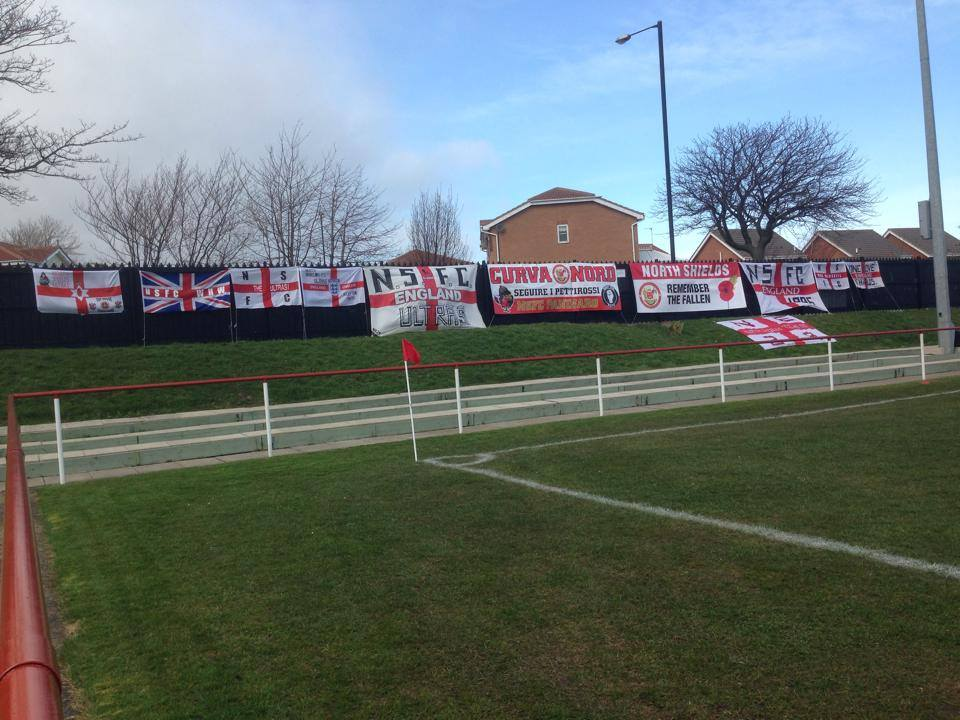
The Ultras display of flags

The ground has covered seating and standing areas. The record attendance for the stadium is 1,500 (the maximum permitted due to health and safety regulations), recorded during the FA Vase semi-final second leg victory against Highworth Town FC on 28 March 2015.

North Shields Football Club and its supporters have been granted an early Christmas present as formal confirmation that a new club house will be built at their Daren Persson Stadium. Building work is set to commence within a matter of weeks as news of a £100,000 Football Foundation Grant and planning approval by North Tyneside Council were received. The club house is to be built on land adjacent to their stadium on the corner of Silkey's Lane and West Percy Road servicing their facilities built on the site of the old Ralph Gardner School playing fields.

== League results ==
As of end of 2022–23 season

Season	Level	League	Played	Won	Drawn	Lost	GF	GA	GD	Points	Final
2005–06	10	Northern Football League Division Two	38	13	8	17	57	67	-10	47	12th
2006–07	10	Northern Football League Division Two	40	13	4	23	49	72	-23	43	18th
2007–08	10	Northern Football League Division Two	38	11	4	23	50	87	-37	37	17th
2008–09	10	Northern Football League Division Two	38	13	6	19	53	76	-23	45	15th
2009–10	10	Northern Football League Division Two	38	17	12	9	66	52	+14	63	6th
2010–11	10	Northern Football League Division Two	42	24	8	6	98	36	+62	80	4th
2011–12	10	Northern Football League Division Two	42	19	11	12	77	51	+26	68	8th
2012–13	10	Northern Football League Division Two	42	21	7	14	72	54	+18	70	8th
2013–14	10	Northern Football League Division Two	42	31	3	4	141	33	+108	100	1st promoted
2014–15	9	Northern Football League Division One	42	26	7	9	87	49	+38	85	4th
2015–16	9	Northern Football League Division One	42	21	9	12	77	48	+29	72	5th
2016–17	9	Northern Football League Division One	42	32	5	5	107	39	+68	101	3rd
2017–18	9	Northern Football League Division One	42	21	6	15	103	73	+30	69	8th
2018–19	9	Northern Football League Division One	34	16	4	14	58	55	+3	69	9th
2019–20 (Note: Due to the COVID-19 pandemic, the season was formally abandoned on 26 March 2020 with all results being expunged and no promotions or relegations taking place)	9	Northern Football League Division One	28	16	6	6	56	37	+19	54	4th
2020–21 (Note: Due to restrictions on clubs' ability to play matches in the COVID-19 lockdowns, competitions at steps 3–6 were curtailed on 24 February 2021)	9	Northern Football League Division One	11	8	2	1	27	12	+15	26	4th
2021–22	9	Northern Football League Division One	38	25	9	4	88	30	+58	84	1st promoted
2022–23	8	Northern Premier League Division One East	38	14	11	13	50	45	+5	53	7th demoted

== Honours ==
INTERNATIONAL

- Anglo Italian Amateur Cup
  - Joint Winners: 1968–69

NATIONAL

- FA Amateur Cup
  - Winners: 1968-69
- FA Vase
  - Winners: 2014-15

LEAGUE

- Northern Combination
  - Runners-up: (As North Shields Athletic) 1900–01
- Northern Alliance
  - Champions: (As North Shields Athletic) 1906–07, 1907–08
- North Eastern League
  - Division 2
    - Champions: 1928–29
  - Division 1
    - Champions: 1949–50
    - Runners-up: 1951–52
  - League Cup Winners: 1944–45, 1956–57
- Midland League
  - Runners-up: 1959–60
- Northern Counties League
  - Champions: 1960–61
  - League Cup Winners: 1960–61
- Northern League
  - Division 1
    - Champions: 1968–69, 2021–22
    - Runners-up: 1965–66, 1983–84
    - League Cup Winners: 2025-25
    - League Cup Runners-up: 2016–17
  - Division 2
    - Champions: 2013–14
  - League Cup Winners: 1968–69, 1971–72
- Northern Counties East League
  - Champions: 1991–92
  - Runners-up: 1989–90, 1990–91
  - League Cup Winners: 1991–92
- Wearside League
  - Division 2
    - Runners-up: 1992–93
  - Division 1
    - Champions: 1998–99 (as North Shields Athletic), 2001–02, 2003–04
    - Runners-up: 2000–01

REGIONAL

- Northumberland Senior Cup
  - Winners: 1905–06, 1907–08, 1911–12 (joint), 1937–38, 1947–48, 1953–54, 1957–58, 1959–60, 1965–66, 1975–76, 1978–79, 1990–91, 2015–2016
  - Runners-up: 1914–15, 1921–22, 1925–26, 1935–36, 1936–37, 1952–53, 1968–69, 1969–70, 1971–72, 1977–78, 1984–85, 1988–89, 1989–90, 1991–92, 2016–2017, 2018-2019
