= Whitehaven A.F.C. =

Association football club in England

Coordinates: 54°32′20.62″N 3°34′59.67″W

Whitehaven A.F.C
- Full name: Whitehaven Amateur Football Club
- Nickname: Lions
- Founded: 1994
- Ground: County Ground, Whitehaven
- Capacity: 2,000
- Chairman: Luke Johnston
- Manager: Jon Karl Benson
- League: West Lancashire League Premier Division
- 2024–25: West Lancashire League Premier Division, 13th of 16
Home colours

Whitehaven Amateur Football Club is a football club in Whitehaven, Cumbria. The club are currently members of the West Lancashire League Premier Division and play at the County Ground.

== Ground ==
A new ground for the club has been in the planning stages for some time, however it has been beset with problems. It was envisaged that a £6 million sports stadium (sharing with Whitehaven R.L.F.C.) would be designed with an 8,000-capacity, though it is believed the final price tag could be higher. However, upgraded individual facilities will instead be installed, including a new clubhouse.

The new facility was hoped to be part of a sports village for the site as part of a £20 million Pow Beck regeneration, in which Copeland Council and West Lakes Renaissance are the most significant players.

== Honours ==
- Wearside League
  - Champions 2005–06
  - Runners-up 2006–07
- Wearside League Division Two
  - Champions 1995–96

== Records ==
- FA Cup
  - Preliminary Round 2010–11, 2011–12, 2012–13, 2013–14
- FA Vase
  - Second Qualifying Round 2009–10, 2010–11, 2011–12
