= Guisborough Town F.C. =

Association football club in England

Coordinates: 54°32′17.79″N 1°03′51.25″W

Guisborough Town
- Full name: Guisborough Town Football Club
- Nickname: The Priorymen
- Founded: 1973
- Ground: King George V Stadium, Guisborough
- Chairman: Andy Willis
- Manager: Gary Forster
- League: Northern Premier League Division One East
- 2025–26: Northern League Division One, 1st of 19 (promoted)
Home colours	Away colours

Guisborough Town Football Club is a football club based in Guisborough, North Yorkshire, England. They are currently members of the Northern Premier League Division One East and play at the King George V Ground.

== History ==
The club was established in 1973 and joined the Middlesbrough & District League. They later switched to the South Bank & District League before joining the Northern Alliance in 1977. They finished third in their first season in the league and then as runners-up in their second season, also winning the League Cup. The club went on to win the league in 1979–80 without losing a match. They also reached the final of the FA Vase, eventually losing 2–0 to Stamford at Wembley. The club then joined the Premier Division of the Midland League. In 1982 the league merged with the Yorkshire League to form the Northern Counties East League, with a fifth-place finish in 1981–82 seeing Guisborough placed in the Premier Division of the new league.

In 1985 Guisborough switched to the Northern League, effectively dropping a division as they were placed in Division Two. In 1986–87 they were Division Two runners-up and were promoted to the Premier Division. In 1988–89 the club won both the League Cup, the league's Cleator Cup. In the FA Cup they reached the first round of the competition for the first time after playing eight qualifying games. Drawn at home to Third Division Bury, the match was moved to Middlesbrough's Ayresome Park where Bury won 1–0 in front of a crowd of 5,990. The club won the North Riding Senior Cup the following season, and retained it in 1990–91, a season which also saw them finish as Division One runners-up. They went on to win the Senior Cup again in 1992–93 and 1993–94. In 2004–05 the club finished bottom of Division One and were relegated to Division Two.

The 2010–11 season saw Guisborough end the season as Division Two runners-up, earning promotion back to Division One. They also won the North Riding Senior Cup for a fifth time. In 2013–14 they won the Senior Cup again.

== Current squad ==
As of 19 August 2026

Note: Flags indicate national team as defined under FIFA eligibility rules; some limited exceptions apply. Players may hold more than one non-FIFA nationality.

No.	Pos.	Nation	Player
—	GK	ENG	Ryan Catterick
—	DF	ENG	Harvey Coates
—	DF	ENG	Sam Collins
—	DF	ENG	Ben Errington
—	DF	ENG	Soni Fergus
—	DF	ENG	James Frazer
—	DF	ENG	Kallum Griffiths
—	MF	ENG	Jack Bailey
—	MF	ENG	Alfie Doherty
—	MF	ENG	Joe Ferguson

No.	Pos.	Nation	Player
—	MF	ENG	Josh MacDonald
—	MF	ENG	Alex Payne
—	MF	ENG	Leo Robinson
—	MF	ENG	Billy Waller
—	FW	ENG	Elliott Beddow
—	FW	ENG	Noah Cunningham
—	FW	ENG	Jey Draper
—	FW	ENG	Toluwani Osiyemi
—	FW	ENG	Connor Simpson
—	FW	ENG	Matthew Willshaw

== Honours ==
- Northern League
  - Division One champions 2025–26
  - League Cup winners 1988–89
  - Cleator Cup winners 1988–89
- Northern Alliance
  - Champions 1979–80
  - League Cup winners: 1978–79
- North Riding Senior Cup
  - Winners 1989–90, 1990–91, 1992–93, 1993–94, 2010–11, 2013–14
- North Riding County Cup
  - Winners 1975–76

== Records ==
- Best FA Cup performance: First round, 1988–89
- Best FA Trophy performance: First round, 1989–90, 1990–91, 1991–92, 1992–93
- Best FA Vase performance: Finalists, 1979–80
- Record attendance: 3,112 vs Hungerford Town, FA Vase semi-final, 29 March 1980
- Most appearances: Mark Davis, 587
- Most goals: Mark Davis, 341

== See also ==
- Guisborough Town F.C. players
- Guisborough Town F.C. managers
