= 1997–98 Midland Football Combination =

The 1997–98 Midland Football Combination season was the 61st in the history of Midland Football Combination, a football competition in England.

== Premier Division ==
Midland Football Combination Premier Division
- Season: 1997–98
- Champions: Worcester Athletico
- Relegated: Wellesbourne
- Matches: 420
- Goals: 1,450 (3.45 per match)

The Premier Division featured 17 clubs which competed in the division last season, along with four new clubs, promoted from Division One:

- Cheslyn Hay
- Continental Star
- Dudley Sports
- GPT Coventry

=== League table ===
Pos	Team	Pld	W	D	L	GF	GA	GD	Pts	Promotion or relegation
1	Worcester Athletico	40	26	12	2	111	41	+70	90	Merged into Pershore Town
2	Southam United	40	24	11	5	84	38	+46	83	
3	Bolehall Swifts	40	25	8	7	76	43	+33	83	
4	Studley BKL	40	24	4	12	79	36	+43	76	
5	Coleshill Town	40	21	9	10	78	38	+40	72	
6	GPT Coventry	40	20	8	12	71	46	+25	68	
7	Meir KA	40	20	7	13	81	58	+23	67	
8	David Lloyd	40	19	7	14	80	66	+14	64	Resigned from the league
9	Kings Heath	40	17	12	11	62	45	+17	63	
10	Continental Star	40	18	7	15	78	69	+9	61	
11	Knowle	40	14	12	14	81	72	+9	54	Demoted to Division One
12	Bilston Community College	40	15	9	16	69	76	−7	54	Resigned from the league
13	Coventry Sphinx	40	15	9	16	72	78	−6	51 (Note: Coventry Sphinx deducted 3 points.)	
14	Cheslyn Hay	40	14	9	17	66	86	−20	51	
15	Highgate United	40	12	14	14	59	54	+5	50	
16	Handrahan Timbers	40	11	10	19	52	53	−1	43	
17	Alvechurch	40	12	6	22	67	88	−21	42	
18	Massey Ferguson	40	12	5	23	49	73	−24	41	
19	Kenilworth Town	40	6	8	26	43	98	−55	26	
20	Dudley Sports	40	4	7	29	54	137	−83	19	
21	Wellesbourne	40	1	6	33	38	155	−117	9	Relegated to Division One

Source: nonleaguematters
Rules for classification: 1) points; 2) goal difference; 3) number of goals scored.

== Division One ==
Midland Football Combination Division One
- Season: 1997–98
- Champions: Alveston
- Promoted: Alveston; Feckenham
- Relegated: Fairfield Villa; Barlestone St. Giles

The Division One featured 12 clubs which competed in the division last season, along with 4 new clubs:

- Shirley Town, relegated from the Premier Division
- West Midlands Fire Service, relegated from the Premier Division
- Feckenham, promoted from Division Two
- Fairfield Villa, promoted from Division Two

=== League table ===
Pos	Team	Pld	W	D	L	GF	GA	GD	Pts	Promotion or relegation
1	Alveston	30	23	5	2	82	24	+58	74	Promoted to the Premier Division
2	Northfield Town	30	18	6	6	70	40	+30	60	
3	Feckenham	30	18	5	7	60	36	+24	59	Promoted to the Premier Division
4	Fairfield Villa	30	17	6	7	85	38	+47	57	Relegated to Division Two
5	Colletts Green	30	17	3	10	67	45	+22	54	
6	Polesworth North Warwick	30	15	4	11	86	62	+24	49	Resigned from the league
7	Monica Star	30	12	8	10	70	53	+17	44	Resigned from the league
8	Shirley Town	30	10	11	9	54	48	+6	41	
9	Leicester YMCA	30	11	7	12	52	60	−8	40	Joined Leicestershire Senior League
10	Newhall United	30	11	5	14	52	51	+1	38	Resigned from the league
11	Thimblemill REC	30	12	2	16	55	62	−7	38	
12	Chelmsley Town	30	11	3	16	50	68	−18	36	
13	Holly Lane	30	8	5	17	33	59	−26	29	
14	Barlestone St. Giles	30	7	5	18	45	74	−29	26	Relegated to Division Two
15	Hams Hall	30	7	3	20	26	73	−47	24	
16	West Midlands Fire Service	30	3	2	25	26	120	−94	11	

Source: nonleaguematters
Rules for classification: 1) points; 2) goal ratio; 3) number of goals scored.

== Division Two ==
Midland Football Combination Division Two
- Season: 1997–98
- Champions: Blackheath Electrodrives
- Promoted: Blackheath Electrodrives; Kings Norton Town reserves Alvis SGL; Burntwood; Studley BKL reserves

The Division Two featured 12 clubs which competed in the division last season, along with 5 new clubs:

- Brownhills Town, relegated from Division One
- Swan Sports, promoted from Division Three
- Studley BKL reserves, promoted from Division Three
- Mitchell & Butlers, promoted from Division Three
- Stourbridge Community College

Also, Richmond Swifts reserves changed name to Kings Norton Town reserves and Mitchell & Butlers changed name to Mitchells.

=== League table ===
Pos	Team	Pld	W	D	L	GF	GA	GD	Pts	Promotion or relegation
1	Blackheath Electrodrives	32	18	8	6	66	28	+38	62	Promoted to Division One
2	Kings Norton Town reserves	32	18	8	6	79	45	+34	62	Promoted to Division One
3	Alvis SGL	32	16	11	5	70	35	+35	59	Promoted to Division One
4	Stourbridge Community College	32	18	5	9	70	50	+20	59	Resigned from the league
5	Swan Sports	32	16	9	7	67	53	+14	57	Resigned from the league
6	Burntwood	32	15	8	9	83	45	+38	53	Promoted to Division One
7	Studley BKL reserves	32	16	4	12	52	37	+15	52	Promoted to Division One
8	Mitchells	32	13	6	13	59	56	+3	45	Resigned from the league
9	Cadbury Athletic	32	13	5	14	45	50	−5	44	
10	Brownhills Town	32	12	5	15	65	66	−1	41	
11	Ledbury Town	32	11	6	15	53	61	−8	39	
12	Albright & Wilson	32	9	6	17	52	64	−12	33	Resigned from the league
13	Tipton S & S	32	9	9	14	56	74	−18	33 (Note: Tipton S & S deducted 3 points.)	Resigned from the league
14	Birmingham Vaults	32	9	6	17	46	72	−26	33	
15	Earlswood Town	32	7	11	14	46	69	−23	32	
16	Enville Athletic	32	8	2	22	29	96	−67	26	
17	West Midlands Police reserves	32	6	7	19	32	69	−37	25	

Source: nonleaguematters
Rules for classification: 1) points; 2) goal ratio; 3) number of goals scored.

== Division Three ==
Midland Football Combination Division Three
- Season: 1997–98
- Champions: Old Hill Town
- Promoted: Old Hill Town; Hansaker; Wyre Forest; GNP Sports; Kenilworth Wardens

The Division Three featured 6 clubs which competed in the division last season, along with 9 new clubs:

- Archdale, relegated from Division Two
- Old Hill Town
- Hansaker
- Wyre Forest
- GNP Sports
- Continental Star reserves
- Barnt Green Spartak
- Knowle reserves
- Erdington Albion

Also, Birchfield Sports changed name to Birchfield Oaklands.

=== League table ===
Pos	Team	Pld	W	D	L	GF	GA	GD	Pts	Promotion or relegation
1	Old Hill Town	28	20	4	4	88	40	+48	64	Promoted to Division Two
2	Hansaker	28	19	2	7	81	27	+54	59	Promoted to Division Two
3	Wyre Forest	28	18	5	5	84	35	+49	59	Promoted to Division Two
4	GNP Sports	28	16	4	8	44	31	+13	52	Promoted to Division Two
5	Kenilworth Wardens	28	15	4	9	61	49	+12	49	Promoted to Division Two
6	Continental Star reserves	28	15	1	12	52	49	+3	46	
7	Barnt Green Spartak	28	12	7	9	71	70	+1	43	
8	Birchfield Oaklands	28	12	6	10	60	69	−9	39 (Note: Birchfield Oaklands deducted 3 points.)	Resigned from the league
9	Knowle reserves	28	9	10	9	64	50	+14	37	
10	Erdington Albion	28	9	6	13	62	71	−9	33	Resigned from the league
11	Archdale	28	9	3	16	50	69	−19	30	
12	Tipton Town reserves	28	7	7	14	65	78	−13	28	
13	Dudley Sports reserves	28	7	3	18	41	75	−34	24	
14	Alvechurch reserves	28	5	5	18	54	95	−41	20	Resigned from the league
15	Kenilworth Town reserves	28	1	5	22	31	100	−69	8	

Source: nonleaguematters
Rules for classification: 1) points; 2) goal ratio; 3) number of goals scored.
