= 1993–94 Midland Football Combination =

The 1993–94 Midland Football Combination season was the 57th in the history of Midland Football Combination, a football competition in England.

At the end of the season Midland Football Alliance were to be created. Ten Premier Division clubs joined newly formed league along with West Midlands (Regional) League clubs. Thus, the league became Midland Alliance feeder and downgraded to ninth level of the overall English football league system.

== Premier Division ==
Midland Football Combination Premier Division
- Season: 1993–94
- Champions: Pershore Town
- Matches: 462
- Goals: 1,610 (3.48 per match)

The Premier Division featured 17 clubs which competed in the division last season, along with five new clubs:

- Ansells, promoted from Division Two
- Kings Heath, promoted from Division One
- Shepshed Albion, relegated from the Northern Premier League
- Shifnal Town
- Wellesbourne, promoted from Division One

=== League table ===
Pos	Team	Pld	W	D	L	GF	GA	GD	Pts	Promotion or relegation
1	Pershore Town	42	25	13	4	84	35	+49	88	Joined the Midland Football Alliance
2	West Midlands Police	42	25	10	7	95	49	+46	85	Joined the Midland Football Alliance
3	Shifnal Town	42	25	8	9	112	35	+77	83	Joined the Midland Football Alliance
4	Shepshed Albion	42	23	10	9	87	47	+40	79	Joined the Midland Football Alliance
5	Boldmere St. Michaels	42	22	7	13	74	54	+20	73	Joined the Midland Football Alliance
6	Northfield Town	42	20	9	13	83	65	+18	69	
7	Studley BKL	42	19	11	12	91	76	+15	68	
8	Wellesbourne	42	18	11	13	78	60	+18	65	
9	Stratford Town	42	19	8	15	73	56	+17	65	Joined the Midland Football Alliance
10	Meir KA	42	17	11	14	101	78	+23	62	
11	Stapenhill	42	17	11	14	77	55	+22	62	Joined the Midland Football Alliance
12	Barwell	42	18	8	16	69	61	+8	62	Joined the Midland Football Alliance
13	Sandwell Borough	42	15	14	13	82	71	+11	59	Joined the Midland Football Alliance
14	Bolehall Swifts	42	17	7	18	61	77	−16	58	Joined the Midland Football Alliance
15	Knowle	42	12	13	17	63	67	−4	49	
16	Bloxwich Town	42	14	6	22	65	108	−43	48	
17	Coleshill Town	42	10	15	17	53	72	−19	45	
18	Kings Heath	42	11	9	22	65	99	−34	42	
19	Highgate United	42	12	6	24	58	98	−40	42	
20	Chelmsley Town	42	8	9	25	55	94	−39	33	
21	Ansells	42	5	11	26	43	109	−66	26	
22	Mile Oak Rovers	42	2	9	31	32	135	−103	15	Resigned from the league

Source: nonleaguematters
Rules for classification: 1) points; 2) goal difference; 3) number of goals scored.

== Division One ==
Midland Football Combination Division One
- Season: 1993–94
- Champions: West Midlands Fire Service
- Promoted: West Midlands Fire Service; Handrahan Timbers; Olton Royale; Sherwood Celtic; Shirley Town; Upton Town

The Division One featured 15 clubs which competed in the division last season, along with 4 new clubs:

- Barlestone St. Giles, relegated from the Premier Division
- Shirley Town, promoted from Division Two
- Colletts Green, promoted from Division Two
- Monica Star, promoted from Division Two

Also, West Heath United changed name to Olton Royale.

=== League table ===
Pos	Team	Pld	W	D	L	GF	GA	GD	Pts	Promotion or relegation
1	West Midlands Fire Service	36	25	5	6	86	35	+51	80	Promoted to the Premier Division
2	Handrahan Timbers	36	22	9	5	72	44	+28	75	Promoted to the Premier Division
3	Solihull Borough reserves	36	21	5	10	95	55	+40	68	Resigned from the league
4	Kenilworth Town	36	20	8	8	77	38	+39	68	
5	Colletts Green	36	19	8	9	76	46	+30	65	
6	Olton Royale	36	19	6	11	64	43	+21	63	Promoted to the Premier Division
7	Sherwood Celtic	36	16	12	8	68	41	+27	60	Promoted to the Premier Division
8	Shirley Town	36	16	7	13	63	65	−2	55	Promoted to the Premier Division
9	Hams Hall	36	15	3	18	66	65	+1	48	
10	Kings Norton Ex-Service	36	11	11	14	60	65	−5	44	
11	Southam United	36	11	11	14	45	54	−9	44	
12	Upton Town	36	11	11	14	49	64	−15	44	Promoted to the Premier Division
13	Monica Star	36	13	2	21	52	74	−22	41	
14	Becketts Sporting	36	11	6	19	49	83	−34	39	Resigned from the league
15	Badsey Rangers	36	10	7	19	43	61	−18	37	
16	Polesworth North Warwick	36	10	4	22	54	78	−24	34	
17	Barlestone St. Giles	36	10	3	23	58	84	−26	33	
18	Dudley Sports	36	7	11	18	53	84	−31	32	
19	Wilmcote	36	8	5	23	54	105	−51	29	

Source: nonleaguematters
Rules for classification: 1) points; 2) goal ratio; 3) number of goals scored.

== Division Two ==
Midland Football Combination Division Two
- Season: 1993–94
- Champions: Massey-Ferguson
- Promoted: Massey-Ferguson; Jaguar-Daimler; Thimblemill REC; Sphinx; GPT Coventry

The Division Two featured 11 clubs which competed in the division last season, along with 8 new clubs:

- Ledbury Town, relegated from Division One
- Massey-Ferguson
- Jaguar-Daimler
- Sphinx
- GPT Coventry
- Rugby Town
- Alvis SGL
- Sutton Coldfield Town Reserves

=== League table ===
Pos	Team	Pld	W	D	L	GF	GA	GD	Pts	Promotion or relegation
1	Massey-Ferguson	36	30	5	1	137	27	+110	95	Promoted to Division One
2	Jaguar-Daimler	36	25	5	6	103	41	+62	80	Promoted to Division One
3	Thimblemill REC	36	24	5	7	79	31	+48	77	Promoted to Division One
4	Sphinx	36	23	7	6	96	49	+47	76	Promoted to Division One
5	GPT Coventry	36	21	7	8	75	49	+26	70	Promoted to Division One
6	Holly Lane	36	18	8	10	91	63	+28	62	
7	Fairfield Villa	36	16	7	13	61	38	+23	55	
8	Swift Personalised Products	36	14	7	15	64	54	+10	49	
9	Burntwood	36	13	7	16	61	84	−23	46	
10	Rugby Town	36	11	10	15	65	67	−2	43	
11	Archdale	36	12	7	17	60	85	−25	43	
12	Studley BKL reserves	36	12	5	19	57	73	−16	41	
13	Alvis SGL	36	10	10	16	36	56	−20	40	
14	Enville Athletic	36	11	5	20	59	81	−22	38	
15	Coleshill Town reserves	36	9	7	20	41	81	−40	34	
16	Ledbury Town	36	8	7	21	66	100	−34	31	
17	Sutton Coldfield Town Reserves	36	7	10	19	53	87	−34	31	Resigned from the league
18	Meir KA reserves	36	9	2	25	46	117	−71	29	Resigned from the league
19	Earlswood Town	36	5	7	24	29	96	−67	22	

Source: nonleaguematters
Rules for classification: 1) points; 2) goal ratio; 3) number of goals scored.

== Division Three ==
Midland Football Combination Division Three
- Season: 1993–94
- Champions: Albright & Wilson
- Promoted: Bilston Community College to Division One; Albright & Wilson; Continental Star; Blackheath Electrodrives; Alveston to Division Two

The Division Three featured 16 new clubs:

- Kenilworth Town reserves, relegated from Division Two
- Barlestone St. Giles reserves, relegated from Division Two
- Wellesbourne reserves, relegated from Division Two
- Dudley Sports reserves, relegated from Division Two
- Blackheath Electrodrives, transferred from West Midlands (Regional) League Division Two
- Mitchell & Butlers, transferred from West Midlands (Regional) League Division Two
- Albright & Wilson, transferred from West Midlands (Regional) League Division Two
- Park Rangers, transferred from West Midlands (Regional) League Division Two
- Continental Star
- Bilston Community College
- West Midlands Police reserves
- Alveston
- Stapenhill reserves
- Ansells reserves
- Wilmcote reserves
- Enville Athletic reserves

=== League table ===
Pos	Team	Pld	W	D	L	GF	GA	GD	Pts	Promotion or relegation
1	Albright & Wilson	30	22	4	4	91	30	+61	70	Promoted to Division Two
2	Continental Star	30	22	2	6	99	35	+64	68	Promoted to Division Two
3	Blackheath Electrodrives	30	21	2	7	86	38	+48	65	Promoted to Division Two
4	Bilston Community College	30	19	5	6	96	40	+56	62	Promoted to Division One
5	West Midlands Police reserves	30	18	5	7	84	48	+36	59	
6	Alveston	30	17	4	9	98	53	+45	55	Promoted to Division Two
7	Mitchell & Butlers	30	16	6	8	102	57	+45	54	
8	Wellesbourne reserves	30	15	7	8	86	47	+39	52	
9	Stapenhill reserves	30	14	6	10	62	48	+14	48	Resigned from the league
10	Ansells reserves	30	12	5	13	58	61	−3	41	
11	Kenilworth Town reserves	30	9	3	18	59	82	−23	30	Resigned from the league
12	Wilmcote reserves	30	7	7	16	34	84	−50	28	
13	Park Rangers	30	6	4	20	68	98	−30	22	
14	Enville Athletic reserves	30	3	4	23	30	106	−76	13	
15	Dudley Sports reserves	30	2	6	22	34	110	−76	12	
16	Barlestone St. Giles reserves	30	1	2	27	16	166	−150	5	

Source: nonleaguematters
Rules for classification: 1) points; 2) goal ratio; 3) number of goals scored.
