= 1996–97 Midland Football Combination =

The 1996–97 Midland Football Combination season was the 60th in the history of Midland Football Combination, a football competition in England.

== Premier Division ==
Midland Football Combination Premier Division
- Season: 1996–97
- Champions: Richmond Swifts
- Promoted: Richmond Swifts
- Relegated: Shirley Town; West Midlands Fire Service
- Matches: 380
- Goals: 1,286 (3.38 per match)

The Premier Division featured 15 clubs which competed in the division last season, along with five new clubs:

- Bilston Community College, promoted from Division One
- Bolehall Swifts, relegated from the Midland Football Alliance
- Kenilworth Town, promoted from Division One
- Richmond Swifts, promoted from Division One
- Worcester Athletico

Also, Ansells was renamed David Lloyd, and Alvechurch Villa was renamed Alvechurch.

=== League table ===
Pos	Team	Pld	W	D	L	GF	GA	GD	Pts	Promotion or relegation
1	Richmond Swifts	38	30	5	3	92	29	+63	95	Promoted to the Midland Football Alliance
2	Meir KA	38	26	6	6	91	39	+52	84	
3	Coleshill Town	38	22	10	6	69	30	+39	76	
4	Studley BKL	38	22	6	10	100	49	+51	72	
5	Knowle	38	22	4	12	83	47	+36	70	
6	Worcester Athletico	38	20	7	11	85	60	+25	67	
7	Kings Heath	38	16	8	14	66	50	+16	56	
8	Massey Ferguson	38	15	11	12	62	61	+1	56	
9	David Lloyd	38	14	11	13	54	57	−3	53	
10	Handrahan Timbers	38	15	6	17	46	54	−8	51	
11	Coventry Sphinx	38	14	8	16	51	74	−23	50	
12	Bilston Community College	38	14	7	17	83	71	+12	49	
13	Bolehall Swifts	38	11	14	13	62	59	+3	47	
14	Southam United	38	13	8	17	53	62	−9	47	
15	Wellesbourne	38	12	5	21	62	89	−27	41	
16	Kenilworth Town	38	11	8	19	49	80	−31	41	
17	Highgate United	38	11	3	24	55	77	−22	36	
18	Alvechurch	38	9	5	24	46	82	−36	32	
19	Shirley Town	38	7	8	23	51	94	−43	29	Relegated to Division One
20	West Midlands Fire Service	38	4	4	30	26	122	−96	16	Relegated to Division One

Source: nonleaguematters
Rules for classification: 1) points; 2) goal difference; 3) number of goals scored.

== Division One ==
Midland Football Combination Division One
- Season: 1996–97
- Champions: GPT Coventry
- Promoted: GPT Coventry; Continental Star; Cheslyn Hay; Dudley Sports
- Relegated: Brownhills Town

The Division One featured 11 clubs which competed in the division last season, along with 7 new clubs:

- Chelmsley Town, demoted from the Premier Division
- Northfield Town, relegated from the Premier Division
- Continental Star, promoted from Division Two
- Brownhills Town, promoted from Division Two
- Cheslyn Hay, promoted from Division Two
- Yardley
- Leicester YMCA

=== League table ===
Pos	Team	Pld	W	D	L	GF	GA	GD	Pts	Promotion or relegation
1	GPT Coventry	34	26	3	5	91	16	+75	81	Promoted to the Premier Division
2	Continental Star	34	21	8	5	91	37	+54	71	Promoted to the Premier Division
3	Alveston	34	21	7	6	78	39	+39	70	
4	Cheslyn Hay	34	20	4	10	89	59	+30	64	Promoted to the Premier Division
5	Northfield Town	34	18	7	9	68	41	+27	61	
6	Newhall United	34	16	10	8	82	52	+30	58	
7	Dudley Sports	34	17	7	10	64	42	+22	58	Promoted to the Premier Division
8	Colletts Green	34	15	6	13	59	50	+9	51	
9	Yardley	34	16	3	15	63	55	+8	51	Resigned from the league
10	Polesworth North Warwick	34	15	5	14	62	66	−4	50	
11	Holly Lane	34	13	9	12	50	50	0	48	
12	Monica Star	34	12	8	14	59	50	+9	44	
13	Leicester YMCA	34	12	5	17	57	70	−13	41	
14	Chelmsley Town	34	10	6	18	51	66	−15	36	
15	Thimblemill REC	34	5	8	21	34	99	−65	23	
16	Barlestone St. Giles	34	5	6	23	27	98	−71	21	
17	Hams Hall	34	4	5	25	44	90	−46	17	
18	Brownhills Town	34	4	5	25	29	118	−89	17	Relegated to Division Two

Source: nonleaguematters
Rules for classification: 1) points; 2) goal ratio; 3) number of goals scored.

== Division Two ==
Midland Football Combination Division Two
- Season: 1996–97
- Champions: Feckenham
- Promoted: Feckenham; Fairfield Villa
- Relegated: Archdale

The Division Two featured 10 clubs which competed in the division last season, along with 6 new clubs:

- Fairfield Villa, relegated from Division One
- Badsey Rangers, relegated from Division One
- Feckenham, promoted from Division Three
- Richmond Swifts reserves, promoted from Division Three
- Tipton S & S, promoted from Division Three
- Birmingham Vaults, promoted from Division Three

=== League table ===
Pos	Team	Pld	W	D	L	GF	GA	GD	Pts	Promotion or relegation
1	Feckenham	30	21	5	4	79	27	+52	68	Promoted to Division One
2	Fairfield Villa	30	19	5	6	72	37	+35	62	Promoted to Division One
3	Ledbury Town	30	17	7	6	77	42	+35	58	
4	Richmond Swifts reserves	30	17	5	8	68	32	+36	56	
5	Tipton S & S	30	14	7	9	50	35	+15	49	
6	Burntwood	30	15	4	11	47	41	+6	49	
7	Alvis SGL	30	13	8	9	46	37	+9	47	
8	Earlswood Town	30	13	6	11	58	40	+18	45	
9	Blackheath Electrodrives	30	12	6	12	35	38	−3	42	
10	Cadbury Athletic	30	11	8	11	48	39	+9	41	
11	West Midlands Police reserves	30	10	8	12	42	49	−7	38	
12	Enville Athletic	30	10	5	15	36	48	−12	35	
13	Birmingham Vaults	30	7	6	17	28	68	−40	27	
14	Albright & Wilson	30	6	6	18	40	75	−35	24	
15	Badsey Rangers	30	5	5	20	22	65	−43	20	Resigned from the league
16	Archdale	30	2	5	23	29	104	−75	11	Relegated to Division Three

Source: nonleaguematters
Rules for classification: 1) points; 2) goal ratio; 3) number of goals scored.

== Division Three ==
Midland Football Combination Division Three
- Season: 1996–97
- Champions: Swan Sports
- Promoted: Swan Sports; Studley BKL reserves Mitchell & Butlers

The Division Three featured 10 clubs which competed in the division last season, along with 2 new clubs:

- Tipton Town reserves
- Kenilworth Town reserves

Also, Alvechurch Villa reserves changed name to Alvechurch reserves.

=== League table ===
Pos	Team	Pld	W	D	L	GF	GA	GD	Pts	Promotion or relegation
1	Swan Sports	22	16	2	4	55	20	+35	50	Promoted to Division Two
2	Studley BKL reserves	22	14	5	3	40	16	+24	47	Promoted to Division Two
3	Mitchell & Butlers	22	13	2	7	57	36	+21	41	Promoted to Division Two
4	Cradley Heath	22	12	4	6	46	24	+22	40	Resigned from the league
5	Kenilworth Wardens	22	12	3	7	50	26	+24	39	
6	Tipton Town reserves	22	10	7	5	41	29	+12	37	
7	Alvechurch reserves	22	9	3	10	42	42	0	30	
8	Birchfield Sports	22	7	4	11	29	48	−19	25	
9	Enville Athletic reserves	22	6	3	13	29	45	−16	21	Resigned from the league
10	Kenilworth Town reserves	22	6	1	15	29	53	−24	19	
11	Dudley Sports reserves	22	5	3	14	30	52	−22	18	
12	Barlestone St. Giles reserves	22	2	3	17	10	67	−57	9	Resigned from the league

Source: nonleaguematters
Rules for classification: 1) points; 2) goal ratio; 3) number of goals scored.
