= 1995–96 Midland Football Combination =

The 1995–96 Midland Football Combination season was the 59th in the history of Midland Football Combination, a football competition in England.

== Premier Division ==
Midland Football Combination Premier Division
- Season: 1995–96
- Champions: Bloxwich Town
- Promoted: Bloxwich Town
- Relegated: Northfield Town
- Matches: 380
- Goals: 1,343 (3.53 per match)

The Premier Division featured 17 clubs which competed in the division last season, along with three new clubs, promoted from Division One:

- Massey Ferguson
- Southam United
- Sphinx, who also was renamed Coventry Sphinx

=== League table ===
Pos	Team	Pld	W	D	L	GF	GA	GD	Pts	Promotion or relegation
1	Bloxwich Town	38	31	4	3	122	45	+77	97	Promoted to the Midland Football Alliance
2	Coventry Sphinx	38	25	5	8	87	43	+44	80	
3	Massey Ferguson	38	23	8	7	77	36	+41	77	
4	Knowle	38	21	10	7	87	49	+38	73	
5	Studley BKL	38	17	11	10	93	64	+29	62	
6	Kings Heath	38	18	6	14	63	65	−2	60	
7	Meir KA	38	15	10	13	77	72	+5	55	
8	Wellesbourne	38	15	10	13	55	60	−5	55	
9	Southam United	38	13	14	11	69	63	+6	53	
10	Coleshill Town	38	14	9	15	76	66	+10	51	
11	Chelmsley Town	38	14	8	16	65	62	+3	50	Demoted to Division One
12	Upton Town	38	14	6	18	68	72	−4	48	Resigned from the league
13	Ansells	38	12	10	16	64	81	−17	46	
14	Olton Royale	38	12	8	18	56	71	−15	44	Resigned from the league
15	West Midlands Fire Service	38	11	9	18	51	70	−19	42	
16	Alvechurch Villa	38	10	10	18	57	84	−27	40	
17	Highgate United	38	9	10	19	56	81	−25	37	
18	Handrahan Timbers	38	9	10	19	46	71	−25	37	
19	Shirley Town	38	8	8	22	51	74	−23	32	
20	Northfield Town	38	3	6	29	33	124	−91	15	Relegated to Division One

Source: nonleaguematters
Rules for classification: 1) points; 2) goal difference; 3) number of goals scored.

== Division One ==
Midland Football Combination Division One
- Season: 1995–96
- Champions: Richmond Swifts
- Promoted: Richmond Swifts; Kenilworth Town; Bilston Community College
- Relegated: Fairfield Villa; Badsey Rangers

The Division One featured 12 clubs which competed in the division last season, along with 5 new clubs:

- Richmond Swifts, promoted from Division Two
- Alveston, promoted from Division Two
- Fairfield Villa, promoted from Division Two
- Holly Lane, promoted from Division Two
- Newhall United, joined from the Central Midlands League

=== League table ===
Pos	Team	Pld	W	D	L	GF	GA	GD	Pts	Promotion or relegation
1	Richmond Swifts	32	26	5	1	92	18	+74	83	Promoted to the Premier Division
2	Kenilworth Town	32	17	10	5	75	31	+44	61	Promoted to the Premier Division
3	Bilston Community College	32	18	7	7	78	41	+37	61	Promoted to the Premier Division
4	Colletts Green	32	18	7	7	76	54	+22	61	
5	GPT Coventry	32	19	3	10	84	47	+37	60	
6	Dudley Sports	32	16	8	8	63	39	+24	56	
7	Alveston	32	14	7	11	63	48	+15	49	
8	Polesworth North Warwick	32	12	9	11	60	69	−9	45	
9	Newhall United	32	11	10	11	68	63	+5	43	
10	Monica Star	32	11	8	13	55	56	−1	41	
11	Holly Lane	32	9	11	12	43	53	−10	38	
12	Hams Hall	32	11	4	17	55	68	−13	37	
13	Kings Norton Ex-Service	32	12	1	19	49	82	−33	37	Resigned from the league
14	Thimblemill REC	32	8	4	20	38	73	−35	28	
15	Barlestone St. Giles	32	8	3	21	44	91	−47	27	
16	Fairfield Villa	32	6	4	22	27	75	−48	22	Relegated to Division Two
17	Badsey Rangers	32	2	7	23	30	92	−62	13	Relegated to Division Two

Source: nonleaguematters
Rules for classification: 1) points; 2) goal ratio; 3) number of goals scored.

== Division Two ==
Midland Football Combination Division Two
- Season: 1995–96
- Champions: Continental Star
- Promoted: Continental Star; Brownhills Town; Cheslyn Hay

The Division Two featured 11 clubs which competed in the division last season, along with 7 new clubs:

- West Midlands Police reserves, promoted from Division Three
- Cheslyn Hay, promoted from Division Three
- Brownhills Town, promoted from Division Three
- Wolverhampton Casuals reserves, promoted from Division Three
- Wellesbourne reserves, promoted from Division Three
- Cadbury Athletic, promoted from Division Three
- Bromsgrove Rangers

=== League table ===
Pos	Team	Pld	W	D	L	GF	GA	GD	Pts	Promotion or relegation
1	Continental Star	32	24	6	2	89	28	+61	78	Promoted to Division One
2	Enville Athletic	32	21	5	6	71	31	+40	68	
3	Brownhills Town	32	20	5	7	73	46	+27	65	Promoted to Division One
4	Cheslyn Hay	32	19	4	9	76	54	+22	61	Promoted to Division One
5	Earlswood Town	32	16	9	7	56	30	+26	57	
6	West Midlands Police reserves	32	13	8	11	47	41	+6	47	
7	Bromsgrove Rangers	32	12	8	12	63	59	+4	44	Resigned from the league
8	Ledbury Town	32	11	9	12	71	50	+21	42	
9	Alvis SGL	32	10	12	10	52	41	+11	42	
10	Coleshill Town reserves	32	12	6	14	44	61	−17	42	Resigned from the league
11	Cadbury Athletic	32	11	6	15	36	49	−13	39	
12	Wolverhampton Casuals reserves	32	11	4	17	46	79	−33	37	Transferred to the West Midlands (Regional) League
13	Blackheath Electrodrives	32	8	8	16	40	49	−9	32	
14	Archdale	32	7	8	17	46	60	−14	29	
15	Burntwood	32	7	7	18	41	64	−23	28	
16	Albright & Wilson	32	6	6	20	35	81	−46	24	
17	Wellesbourne reserves	32	6	5	21	33	101	−68	23	Resigned from the league
18	Rugby Town	0	0	0	0	0	0	0	0	Club folded, record expunged

Source: nonleaguematters
Rules for classification: 1) points; 2) goal ratio; 3) number of goals scored.

== Division Three ==
Midland Football Combination Division Three
- Season: 1995–96
- Champions: Feckenham
- Promoted: Feckenham; Richmond Swifts reserves Tipton S & S Birmingham Vaults

The Division Three featured 8 clubs which competed in the division last season, along with 10 new clubs:

- Studley BKL reserves, relegated from Division Two
- Feckenham
- Richmond Swifts reserves
- Tipton S & S
- Birmingham Vaults
- Cradley Heath
- Kenilworth Wardens
- Tipton Rovers
- Swan Sports
- Alvechurch Villa reserves

=== League table ===
Pos	Team	Pld	W	D	L	GF	GA	GD	Pts	Promotion or relegation
1	Feckenham	34	27	5	2	102	26	+76	86	Promoted to Division Two
2	Richmond Swifts reserves	34	25	4	5	89	29	+60	79	Promoted to Division Two
3	Tipton S & S	34	21	5	8	68	30	+38	68	Promoted to Division Two
4	Birmingham Vaults	34	20	8	6	62	38	+24	68	Promoted to Division Two
5	Mitchell & Butlers	34	16	9	9	74	44	+30	57	
6	Studley United	34	16	6	12	64	56	+8	54	Resigned from the league
7	Cradley Heath	34	13	8	13	53	46	+7	47	
8	Kenilworth Wardens	34	13	7	14	51	56	−5	46	
9	Dudley Sports reserves	34	14	3	17	48	55	−7	45	
10	Kings Heath reserves	34	13	2	19	53	79	−26	41	Resigned from the league
11	Enville Athletic reserves	34	10	8	16	47	60	−13	38	
12	Birchfield Sports	34	10	8	16	46	71	−25	38	
13	Tipton Rovers	34	10	7	17	51	59	−8	37	Resigned from the league
14	Swan Sports	34	10	6	18	76	85	−9	36	
15	Studley BKL reserves	34	9	6	19	45	71	−26	33	
16	Alvechurch Villa reserves	34	9	4	21	45	85	−40	31	
17	Barlestone St. Giles reserves	34	8	7	19	35	81	−46	31	
18	Park Rangers	34	5	11	18	51	89	−38	26	Resigned from the league

Source: nonleaguematters
Rules for classification: 1) points; 2) goal ratio; 3) number of goals scored.
