= 1994–95 Midland Football Combination =

The 1994–95 Midland Football Combination season was the 58th in the history of Midland Football Combination, a football competition in England.

== Premier Division ==
Midland Football Combination Premier Division
- Season: 1994–95
- Champions: Northfield Town
- Matches: 306
- Goals: 1,076 (3.52 per match)

The Premier Division featured eleven clubs which competed in the division last season, along with seven new clubs:

- Clubs promoted from Division One:
  - Handrahan Timbers
  - Olton Royale
  - Sherwood Celtic
  - Shirley Town
  - Upton Town
  - West Midlands Fire Service
- Plus:
  - Alvechurch Villa

=== League table ===
Pos	Team	Pld	W	D	L	GF	GA	GD	Pts	Promotion or relegation
1	Northfield Town	34	27	3	4	96	38	+58	84	
2	Bloxwich Town	34	21	9	4	105	39	+66	72	
3	Wellesbourne	34	22	4	8	71	41	+30	70	
4	Olton Royale	34	18	5	11	74	72	+2	59	
5	Alvechurch Villa	34	15	11	8	66	41	+25	56	
6	Meir KA	34	15	8	11	73	63	+10	53	
7	Handrahan Timbers	34	14	9	11	62	48	+14	51	
8	Studley BKL	34	14	9	11	66	53	+13	51	
9	Shirley Town	34	13	6	15	56	68	−12	45	
10	West Midlands Fire Service	34	11	11	12	39	45	−6	44	
11	Chelmsley Town	34	10	10	14	53	65	−12	40	
12	Kings Heath	34	10	7	17	51	69	−18	37	
13	Knowle	34	9	10	15	42	63	−21	37	
14	Coleshill Town	34	9	9	16	45	61	−16	36	
15	Ansells	34	10	5	19	42	64	−22	35	
16	Sherwood Celtic	34	9	5	20	55	81	−26	32	Resigned from the league
17	Upton Town	34	7	7	20	45	68	−23	28	
18	Highgate United	34	6	4	24	35	97	−62	22	

Source: nonleaguematters
Rules for classification: 1) points; 2) goal difference; 3) number of goals scored.

== Division One ==
Midland Football Combination Division One
- Season: 1994–95
- Champions: Massey Ferguson
- Promoted: Massey Ferguson; Sphinx; Southam United

The Division One featured 11 clubs which competed in the division last season, along with 6 new clubs:

- Massey Ferguson, promoted from Division Two
- Jaguar-Daimler, promoted from Division Two
- Thimblemill REC, promoted from Division Two
- Sphinx, promoted from Division Two
- GPT Coventry, promoted from Division Two
- Bilston Community College, promoted from Division Three

=== League table ===
Pos	Team	Pld	W	D	L	GF	GA	GD	Pts	Promotion or relegation
1	Massey Ferguson	32	20	10	2	73	27	+46	70	Promoted to the Premier Division
2	Sphinx	32	21	5	6	72	27	+45	68	Promoted to the Premier Division
3	Southam United	32	21	3	8	72	42	+30	66	Promoted to the Premier Division
4	Bilston Community College	32	19	4	9	86	40	+46	61	
5	GPT Coventry	32	18	3	11	86	62	+24	57	
6	Jaguar-Daimler	32	16	6	10	57	43	+14	54	Resigned from the league
7	Kenilworth Town	32	12	9	11	58	49	+9	45	
8	Hams Hall	32	13	6	13	45	51	−6	45	
9	Polesworth North Warwick	32	12	5	15	67	79	−12	41	
10	Dudley Sports	32	10	8	14	54	63	−9	38	
11	Colletts Green	32	10	7	15	54	65	−11	37	
12	Monica Star	32	8	12	12	39	51	−12	36	
13	Wilmcote	32	9	6	17	48	82	−34	33	Resigned from the league
14	Badsey Rangers	32	8	7	17	43	64	−21	31	
15	Kings Norton Ex-Service	32	8	7	17	50	73	−23	31	
16	Barlestone St. Giles	32	7	7	18	48	82	−34	28	
17	Thimblemill REC	32	6	3	23	40	92	−52	21	

Source: nonleaguematters
Rules for classification: 1) points; 2) goal ratio; 3) number of goals scored.

== Division Two ==
Midland Football Combination Division Two
- Season: 1994–95
- Champions: Richmond Swifts
- Promoted: Richmond Swifts; Alveston; Fairfield Villa; Holly Lane
- Relegated: Studley BKL reserves

The Division Two featured 12 clubs which competed in the division last season, along with 4 new clubs:

- Albright & Wilson, promoted from Division Three
- Continental Star, promoted from Division Three
- Blackheath Electrodrives, promoted from Division Three
- Alveston, promoted from Division Three

Also, Swift Personalised Products changed name to Richmond Swifts.

=== League table ===
Pos	Team	Pld	W	D	L	GF	GA	GD	Pts	Promotion or relegation
1	Richmond Swifts	30	24	2	4	93	23	+70	74	Promoted to Division One
2	Alveston	30	18	5	7	58	30	+28	59	Promoted to Division One
3	Fairfield Villa	30	15	8	7	58	43	+15	53	Promoted to Division One
4	Holly Lane	30	16	4	10	81	47	+34	52	Promoted to Division One
5	Albright & Wilson	30	14	9	7	65	46	+19	51	
6	Alvis SGL	30	15	3	12	44	35	+9	48	
7	Rugby Town	30	14	6	10	61	57	+4	48	
8	Continental Star	30	14	4	12	57	47	+10	46	
9	Earlswood Town	30	11	10	9	54	40	+14	43	
10	Enville Athletic	30	12	6	12	53	56	−3	42	
11	Blackheath Electrodrives	30	10	8	12	43	49	−6	38	
12	Ledbury Town	30	9	3	18	54	73	−19	30	
13	Coleshill Town reserves	30	8	6	16	38	85	−47	30	
14	Archdale	30	8	4	18	42	66	−24	28	
15	Burntwood	30	6	3	21	28	80	−52	21	
16	Studley BKL reserves	30	2	7	21	27	79	−52	13	Relegated to Division Three

Source: nonleaguematters
Rules for classification: 1) points; 2) goal ratio; 3) number of goals scored.

== Division Three ==
Midland Football Combination Division Three
- Season: 1994–95
- Champions: West Midlands Police reserves
- Promoted: West Midlands Police reserves Cheslyn Hay; Brownhills Town; Wolverhampton Casuals reserves Wellesbourne reserves Cadbury Athletic

The Division Three featured 9 clubs which competed in the division last season, along with 8 new clubs:

- Cheslyn Hay, transferred from West Midlands (Regional) League Division One
- Brownhills Town
- Wolverhampton Casuals reserves
- Kings Heath reserves
- Studley United
- Cadbury Athletic
- Birchfield Sports
- Moxley Rangers reserves

=== League table ===
Pos	Team	Pld	W	D	L	GF	GA	GD	Pts	Promotion or relegation
1	West Midlands Police reserves	32	24	4	4	99	35	+64	76	Promoted to Division Two
2	Cheslyn Hay	32	23	3	6	107	46	+61	72	Promoted to Division Two
3	Brownhills Town	32	22	6	4	86	34	+52	72	Promoted to Division Two
4	Wolverhampton Casuals reserves	32	20	3	9	96	42	+54	63	Promoted to Division Two
5	Wellesbourne reserves	32	17	6	9	73	49	+24	57	Promoted to Division Two
6	Mitchell & Butlers	32	17	7	8	72	48	+24	55 (Note: Mitchells & Butlers deducted 3 points.)	
7	Kings Heath reserves	32	17	4	11	76	62	+14	55	
8	Studley United	32	14	8	10	75	58	+17	50	
9	Cadbury Athletic	32	16	1	15	58	59	−1	49	Promoted to Division Two
10	Birchfield Sports	32	13	6	13	64	63	+1	45	
11	Dudley Sports reserves	32	12	6	14	66	65	+1	42	
12	Ansells reserves	32	10	6	16	58	82	−24	36	Resigned from the league
13	Park Rangers	32	10	3	19	66	100	−34	33	
14	Enville Athletic reserves	32	6	4	22	30	71	−41	22	
15	Barlestone St. Giles reserves	32	7	0	25	50	108	−58	21	
16	Moxley Rangers reserves	32	4	5	23	39	82	−43	17	Resigned from the league
17	Wilmcote reserves	32	2	4	26	32	133	−101	10	Resigned from the league

Source: nonleaguematters
Rules for classification: 1) points; 2) goal ratio; 3) number of goals scored.
