= 2004–05 Midland Football Combination =

The 2004–05 Midland Football Combination season was the 68th in the history of Midland Football Combination, a football competition in England.

== Premier Division ==
Midland Football Combination Premier Division
- Season: 2004–05
- Champions: Leamington
- Promoted: Leamington
- Relegated: West Midlands Police
- Matches: 462
- Goals: 1,750 (3.79 per match)

The Premier Division featured 19 clubs which competed in the division last season, along with three new clubs, promoted from Division One:

- Barnt Green Spartak
- Bloxwich Town
- Pilkington XXX

=== League table ===
Pos	Team	Pld	W	D	L	GF	GA	GD	Pts	Promotion or relegation
1	Leamington	42	35	4	3	132	40	+92	109	Promoted to the Midland Football Alliance
2	Coventry Sphinx	42	28	6	8	137	73	+64	90	
3	Coventry Marconi	42	28	4	10	111	55	+56	88	
4	Bloxwich Town	42	26	7	9	91	55	+36	85	Club folded
5	Barnt Green Spartak	42	22	11	9	93	60	+33	77	
6	Southam United	42	23	5	14	84	68	+16	74	
7	Brocton	42	18	11	13	90	62	+28	65	
8	Feckenham	42	19	10	13	85	78	+7	61 (Note: Feckenham deducted 6 points.)	
9	Coleshill Town	42	19	4	19	80	78	+2	61	
10	Castle Vale KH	42	19	4	19	79	77	+2	61	
11	Bolehall Swifts	42	16	9	17	67	75	−8	57	
12	Nuneaton Griff	42	17	4	21	75	79	−4	55	
13	Dudley Sports	42	15	10	17	64	71	−7	55	
14	Meir KA	42	15	6	21	88	91	−3	51	
15	Pilkington XXX	42	12	11	19	75	89	−14	47	
16	Pershore Town	42	13	6	23	75	95	−20	45	
17	Shifnal Town	42	12	9	21	55	82	−27	45	
18	Highgate United	42	12	8	22	50	94	−44	44	
19	Massey Ferguson	42	13	2	27	57	88	−31	38 (Note: Massey Ferguson deducted 3 points.)	
20	Continental Star	42	10	6	26	56	108	−52	36	
21	Alveston	42	9	5	28	59	122	−63	32	
22	West Midlands Police	42	8	4	30	47	110	−63	28	Relegated to the Division One

Source: nonleaguematters
Rules for classification: 1) points; 2) goal difference; 3) number of goals scored.
