= 2005–06 Midland Football Combination =

The 2005–06 Midland Football Combination season was the 69th in the history of Midland Football Combination, a football competition in England.

== Premier Division ==
Midland Football Combination Premier Division
- Season: 2005–06
- Champions: Atherstone Town
- Promoted: Atherstone Town
- Matches: 462
- Goals: 1,623 (3.51 per match)

The Premier Division featured 19 clubs which competed in the division last season, along with three new clubs:

- Atherstone Town, promoted from Division One
- Bridgnorth Town, relegated from the Midland Football Alliance
- Cadbury Athletic, promoted from Division One

Also, Coventry Marconi changed name to Coventry Copsewood and Castle Vale KH changed name to Castle Vale.

=== League table ===
Pos	Team	Pld	W	D	L	GF	GA	GD	Pts	Promotion or relegation
1	Atherstone Town	42	32	7	3	131	27	+104	103	Promoted to the Midland Football Alliance
2	Coventry Sphinx	42	33	4	5	148	60	+88	103	
3	Barnt Green Spartak	42	28	3	11	82	51	+31	87	
4	Feckenham	42	25	6	11	107	64	+43	81	
5	Bridgnorth Town	42	24	7	11	75	48	+27	79	Transferred to the West Midlands (Regional) League
6	Bolehall Swifts	42	24	6	12	90	59	+31	78	
7	Shifnal Town	42	23	8	11	86	44	+42	77	Transferred to the West Midlands (Regional) League
8	Nuneaton Griff	42	19	6	17	73	70	+3	63	
9	Castle Vale	42	18	8	16	73	76	−3	62	
10	Alveston	42	18	4	20	65	61	+4	58	
11	Coleshill Town	42	14	9	19	79	93	−14	51	
12	Brocton	42	13	10	19	56	70	−14	49	
13	Coventry Copsewood	42	14	7	21	56	79	−23	49	
14	Southam United	42	13	9	20	56	65	−9	48	
15	Highgate United	42	13	8	21	51	86	−35	47	
16	Pershore Town	42	14	3	25	63	88	−25	45	
17	Meir KA	42	12	9	21	55	92	−37	45	
18	Dudley Sports	42	11	11	20	51	71	−20	44	Transferred to the West Midlands (Regional) League
19	Pilkington XXX	42	11	8	23	61	109	−48	41	
20	Massey Ferguson	42	11	5	26	46	90	−44	38	
21	Cadbury Athletic	42	11	8	23	68	92	−24	37 (Note: Cadbury Athletic deducted 4 points.)	
22	Continental Star	42	5	6	31	51	128	−77	21	

Source: nonleaguematters
Rules for classification: 1) points; 2) goal difference; 3) number of goals scored.
