= 2003–04 Midland Football Combination =

The 2003–04 Midland Football Combination season was the 67th in the history of Midland Football Combination, a football competition in England.

== Premier Division ==
Midland Football Combination Premier Division
- Season: 2003–04
- Champions: Romulus
- Promoted: Romulus
- Matches: 420
- Goals: 1,456 (3.47 per match)

The Premier Division featured 18 clubs which competed in the division last season, along with three new clubs:

- Brocton, joined from the Midland Football League
- Dudley Sports, promoted from Division One
- Shifnal Town, relegated from the Midland Football Alliance

=== League table ===
Pos	Team	Pld	W	D	L	GF	GA	GD	Pts	Promotion or relegation
1	Romulus	40	31	2	7	128	44	+84	95	Promoted to the Midland Football Alliance
2	Leamington	40	30	4	6	101	36	+65	94	
3	Rugby Town	40	25	5	10	80	55	+25	80	Club folded
4	Coventry Sphinx	40	23	8	9	74	55	+19	77	
5	Feckenham	40	21	8	11	79	63	+16	71	
6	Coventry Marconi	40	22	4	14	84	53	+31	70	
7	Meir KA	40	18	11	11	89	68	+21	65	
8	Nuneaton Griff	40	15	15	10	74	62	+12	60	
9	Castle Vale KH	40	17	8	15	76	72	+4	59	
10	Dudley Sports	40	16	9	15	84	64	+20	57	
11	West Midlands Police	40	16	9	15	67	78	−11	57	
12	Highgate United	40	15	11	14	62	52	+10	56	
13	Bolehall Swifts	40	16	8	16	67	78	−11	56	
14	Brocton	40	15	10	15	53	59	−6	55	
15	Pershore Town	40	10	15	15	65	83	−18	45	
16	Shifnal Town	40	11	10	19	44	52	−8	43	
17	Massey Ferguson	40	12	5	23	65	93	−28	41	
18	Coleshill Town	40	11	5	24	49	83	−34	38	
19	Continental Star	40	6	9	25	53	88	−35	27	
20	Southam United	40	3	6	31	33	115	−82	15	
21	Alveston	40	2	8	30	29	103	−74	14	

Source: nonleaguematters
Rules for classification: 1) points; 2) goal difference; 3) number of goals scored.
