= 1998–99 Midland Football Combination =

The 1998–99 Midland Football Combination season was the 62nd in the history of Midland Football Combination, a football competition in England.

== Premier Division ==
Midland Football Combination Premier Division
- Season: 1998–99
- Champions: Alveston
- Relegated: Dudley Sports
- Matches: 306
- Goals: 1,040 (3.4 per match)

The Premier Division featured 16 clubs which competed in the division last season, along with two new clubs, promoted from Division One:

- Alveston
- Feckenham

=== League table ===
| Pos | Team | Pld | W | D | L | GF | GA | GD | Pts | Promotion or relegation |
|---|---|---|---|---|---|---|---|---|---|---|
| 1 | Alveston | 34 | 21 | 8 | 5 | 74 | 32 | +42 | 71 | |
| 2 | Cheslyn Hay | 34 | 18 | 10 | 6 | 61 | 42 | +19 | 64 | |
| 3 | Southam United | 34 | 16 | 10 | 8 | 70 | 49 | +21 | 58 | |
| 4 | Kings Heath | 34 | 17 | 6 | 11 | 66 | 51 | +15 | 57 | |
| 5 | Massey Ferguson | 34 | 15 | 10 | 9 | 57 | 51 | +6 | 55 | |
| 6 | Meir KA | 34 | 15 | 9 | 10 | 69 | 47 | +22 | 54 | |
| 7 | Studley BKL | 34 | 14 | 11 | 9 | 67 | 43 | +24 | 53 | |
| 8 | GPT Coventry | 34 | 15 | 8 | 11 | 67 | 65 | +2 | 53 | |
| 9 | Handrahan Timbers | 34 | 14 | 10 | 10 | 56 | 47 | +9 | 52 | |
| 10 | Bolehall Swifts | 34 | 13 | 8 | 13 | 58 | 48 | +10 | 47 | |
| 11 | Highgate United | 34 | 13 | 7 | 14 | 69 | 59 | +10 | 46 | |
| 12 | Feckenham | 34 | 10 | 14 | 10 | 45 | 42 | +3 | 44 | |
| 13 | Coventry Sphinx | 34 | 12 | 7 | 15 | 53 | 64 | −11 | 43 | |
| 14 | Alvechurch | 34 | 12 | 4 | 18 | 61 | 77 | −16 | 40 | |
| 15 | Continental Star | 34 | 11 | 7 | 16 | 57 | 69 | −12 | 37 (Note: Continental Star deducted 3 points.) | |
| 16 | Kenilworth Town | 34 | 8 | 8 | 18 | 37 | 67 | −30 | 32 | |
| 17 | Coleshill Town | 34 | 6 | 6 | 22 | 46 | 78 | −32 | 24 | |
| 18 | Dudley Sports | 34 | 2 | 5 | 27 | 27 | 109 | −82 | 11 | Relegated to Division One |

Source: nonleaguematters
Rules for classification: 1) points; 2) goal difference; 3) number of goals scored.
