= 2002–03 Midland Football Combination =

The 2002–03 Midland Football Combination season was the 66th in the history of Midland Football Combination, a football competition in England.

== Premier Division ==
Midland Football Combination Premier Division
- Season: 2002–03
- Champions: Alvechurch
- Promoted: Alvechurch
- Matches: 462
- Goals: 1,735 (3.76 per match)

The Premier Division featured 20 clubs which competed in the division last season, along with two new clubs, promoted from Division One:

- Leamington
- Rugby Town

Also:

- County Sports merged with Division Two club Fernhill Heath Old Boys to create Fernhill County Sports
- Handsworth Continental Star reverted name to Continental Star
- Kings Heath changed name to Castle Vale KH

=== League table ===
Pos	Team	Pld	W	D	L	GF	GA	GD	Pts	Promotion or relegation
1	Alvechurch	42	30	7	5	126	48	+78	97	Promoted to the Midland Football Alliance
2	Coventry Marconi	42	29	5	8	94	37	+57	92	
3	Leamington	42	27	9	6	92	48	+44	90	
4	Bolehall Swifts	42	27	5	10	82	53	+29	86	
5	Romulus	42	24	5	13	107	58	+49	77	
6	Rugby Town	42	22	10	10	90	52	+38	76	
7	Coventry Sphinx	42	23	6	13	95	72	+23	75	
8	Fernhill County Sports	42	21	8	13	74	59	+15	71	Resigned from the league
9	Highgate United	42	23	3	16	95	67	+28	69 (Note: Highgate United deducted 3 points.)	
10	Meir KA	42	21	6	15	94	75	+19	69	
11	Castle Vale KH	42	19	6	17	86	66	+20	63	
12	Nuneaton Griff	42	17	3	22	66	80	−14	54	
13	Continental Star	42	14	9	19	86	88	−2	51	
14	Coleshill Town	42	13	9	20	54	68	−14	48	
15	Pershore Town	42	13	7	22	74	86	−12	46	
16	Massey Ferguson	42	13	7	22	85	112	−27	46	
17	Feckenham	42	12	6	24	66	85	−19	42	
18	West Midlands Police	42	11	9	22	56	87	−31	42	
19	Handrahan Timbers	42	11	8	23	57	73	−16	41	Resigned from the league
20	Alveston	42	9	7	26	66	114	−48	34	
21	Southam United	42	7	2	33	43	162	−119	23	
22	Cheslyn Hay	42	4	7	31	47	145	−98	19	Resigned from the league

Source: nonleaguematters
Rules for classification: 1) points; 2) goal difference; 3) number of goals scored.
