= 2007–08 Midland Football Alliance =

Midland Football Alliance
- Season: 2007–08
- Champions: Atherstone Town
- Promoted: Atherstone Town; Loughborough Dynamo
- Matches: 462
- Goals: 1,485 (3.21 per match)

The 2007–08 Midland Football Alliance season was the 14th in the history of Midland Football Alliance, a football competition in England.

== Clubs and league table ==
The league featured 19 clubs from the previous season, along with three new clubs:

- Coventry Sphinx, promoted from the Midland Football Combination
- Shifnal Town, promoted from the West Midlands (Regional) League
- Stapenhill, promoted from the Leicestershire Senior League

=== League table ===
Pos	Team	Pld	W	D	L	GF	GA	GD	Pts	Promotion or relegation
1	Atherstone Town	42	25	11	6	94	36	+58	86	Promoted to the Southern League Division One Midlands
2	Loughborough Dynamo	42	25	10	7	90	47	+43	85	Promoted to the Northern Premier League Division One South
3	Market Drayton Town	42	25	7	10	96	54	+42	82	
4	Boldmere St. Michaels	42	20	11	11	75	49	+26	71	
5	Rocester	42	18	13	11	77	72	+5	67	
6	Causeway United	42	18	12	12	59	42	+17	66	
7	Stratford Town	42	17	12	13	88	63	+25	63	
8	Coalville Town	42	18	7	17	64	56	+8	61	
9	Tipton Town	42	19	4	19	58	63	−5	61	
10	Barwell	42	16	12	14	61	60	+1	60	
11	Westfields	42	17	8	17	66	56	+10	59	
12	Biddulph Victoria	42	17	8	17	65	65	0	59	
13	Studley	42	17	8	17	58	73	−15	59	
14	Alvechurch	42	17	7	18	68	68	0	58	
15	Shifnal Town	42	15	11	16	64	64	0	56	
16	Friar Lane & Epworth	42	15	11	16	72	77	−5	56	
17	Oadby Town	42	14	9	19	71	68	+3	51	
18	Racing Club Warwick	42	14	8	20	65	82	−17	50	
19	Coventry Sphinx	42	14	3	25	62	97	−35	45	
20	Stapenhill	42	8	11	23	53	97	−44	35	Resigned from the league
21	Oldbury United	42	7	12	23	48	71	−23	32 (Note: Oldbury United deducted 1 point.)	
22	Cradley Town	42	6	5	31	31	125	−94	23	

Source: fchd
Rules for classification: 1) points; 2) goal difference; 3) number of goals scored.
