= 1997–98 Midland Football Alliance =

Midland Football Alliance
- Season: 1997–98
- Champions: Bloxwich Town
- Promoted: Bloxwich Town
- Matches: 380
- Goals: 1,111 (2.92 per match)

The 1997–98 Midland Football Alliance season was the fourth in the history of Midland Football Alliance, a football competition in England.

== Clubs and league table ==
The league featured 18 clubs from the previous season, along with two new clubs:

- Richmond Swifts, promoted from the Midland Football Combination, who also changed name to Kings Norton Town
- Wednesfield, promoted from the West Midlands (Regional) League

=== League table ===
Pos	Team	Pld	W	D	L	GF	GA	GD	Pts	Promotion or relegation
1	Bloxwich Town	38	28	4	6	77	31	+46	88	Promoted to the Southern Football League
2	Rocester	38	23	7	8	74	36	+38	76	
3	Oldbury United	38	20	11	7	73	43	+30	71	
4	Boldmere St. Michaels	38	19	11	8	54	38	+16	68	
5	Kings Norton Town	38	18	13	7	57	37	+20	67	
6	Barwell	38	16	12	10	68	56	+12	60	
7	Bridgnorth Town	38	15	13	10	64	47	+17	58	
8	West Midlands Police	38	15	12	11	58	42	+16	57	
9	Halesowen Harriers	38	17	5	16	53	63	−10	56	
10	Chasetown	38	14	11	13	57	43	+14	53	
11	Wednesfield	38	14	11	13	56	49	+7	53	
12	Knypersley Victoria	38	11	17	10	52	53	−1	50	
13	Willenhall Town	38	12	13	13	45	44	+1	49	
14	Pelsall Villa	38	10	15	13	66	66	0	45	
15	Sandwell Borough	38	10	15	13	57	63	−6	45	
16	Rushall Olympic	38	12	8	18	51	57	−6	44	
17	Stapenhill	38	7	12	19	39	74	−35	33	
18	Stratford Town	38	8	7	23	39	69	−30	31	
19	Pershore Town	38	4	6	28	36	97	−61	18	
20	Shifnal Town	38	3	5	30	35	103	−68	14	

Source: fchd
Rules for classification: 1) points; 2) goal difference; 3) number of goals scored.
