= 1999–2000 Midland Football Alliance =

Midland Football Alliance
- Season: 1999–2000
- Champions: Oadby Town
- Relegated: Pershore Town
- Matches: 462
- Goals: 1,452 (3.14 per match)

The 1999–2000 Midland Football Alliance season was the sixth in the history of Midland Football Alliance, a football competition in England.

== Clubs and league table ==
The league featured 19 clubs from the previous season, along with three new clubs:

- Bloxwich Town, relegated from the Southern Football League
- Cradley Town, promoted from the West Midlands (Regional) League
- Oadby Town, promoted from the Leicestershire Senior League

=== League table ===
Pos	Team	Pld	W	D	L	GF	GA	GD	Pts	Promotion or relegation
1	Oadby Town	42	27	7	8	107	48	+59	88	
2	Stratford Town	42	22	12	8	73	47	+26	78	
3	Willenhall Town	42	20	13	9	77	42	+35	73	
4	Wednesfield	42	21	9	12	71	56	+15	72	
5	Boldmere St. Michaels	42	20	12	10	61	48	+13	72	
6	Stourport Swifts	42	19	13	10	73	57	+16	70	
7	Rushall Olympic	42	20	9	13	75	65	+10	69	
8	Shifnal Town	42	17	16	9	66	50	+16	67	
9	Barwell	42	18	12	12	85	57	+28	66	
10	Oldbury United	42	17	13	12	62	45	+17	64	
11	Chasetown	42	18	7	17	61	62	−1	61	
12	Knypersley Victoria	42	17	10	15	75	71	+4	60 (Note: Knypersley Victoria deducted 1 point.)	
13	West Midlands Police	42	15	8	19	62	71	−9	53	
14	Bridgnorth Town	42	15	7	20	70	72	−2	52	
15	Halesowen Harriers	42	14	8	20	63	71	−8	50	
16	Sandwell Borough	42	12	13	17	53	69	−16	49	
17	Bloxwich Town	42	11	13	18	57	84	−27	46	
18	Kings Norton Town	42	9	16	17	60	68	−8	43	Club folded
19	Cradley Town	42	10	12	20	56	87	−31	42	
20	Pelsall Villa	42	9	10	23	57	88	−31	37	
21	Stapenhill	42	8	6	28	42	91	−49	30	
22	Pershore Town	42	7	6	29	46	103	−57	27	Relegated to the Midland Football Combination

Source: fchd
Rules for classification: 1) points; 2) goal difference; 3) number of goals scored.
