= 2006–07 Midland Football Alliance =

Midland Football Alliance
- Season: 2006–07
- Champions: Leamington
- Promoted: Leamington; Romulus; Quorn
- Matches: 462
- Goals: 1,469 (3.18 per match)

The 2006–07 Midland Football Alliance season was the 13th in the history of Midland Football Alliance, a football competition in England.

== Clubs and league table ==
The league featured 19 clubs from the previous season, along with three new clubs:

- Atherstone Town, promoted from the Midland Football Combination
- Friar Lane & Epworth, promoted from the Leicestershire Senior League
- Market Drayton Town, promoted from the West Midlands (Regional) League

=== League table ===
Pos	Team	Pld	W	D	L	GF	GA	GD	Pts	Promotion or relegation
1	Leamington	42	33	4	5	105	36	+69	103	Promoted to the Southern League Division One Midlands
2	Romulus	42	25	11	6	102	47	+55	86	Promoted to the Southern League Division One Midlands
3	Quorn	42	25	7	10	82	40	+42	82	Promoted to the Northern Premier League Division One South
4	Stratford Town	42	25	7	10	81	47	+34	82	
5	Tipton Town	42	22	8	12	71	48	+23	74	
6	Barwell	42	22	5	15	88	68	+20	71	
7	Boldmere St. Michaels	42	20	6	16	73	56	+17	66	
8	Atherstone Town	42	16	16	10	71	50	+21	64	
9	Loughborough Dynamo	42	19	7	16	73	70	+3	64	
10	Alvechurch	42	17	12	13	66	57	+9	63	
11	Oadby Town	42	19	5	18	68	59	+9	62	
12	Rocester	42	16	7	19	45	66	−21	55	
13	Market Drayton Town	42	14	11	17	61	62	−1	53	
14	Oldbury United	42	13	13	16	48	57	−9	51 (Note: Oldbury United deducted 1 point.)	
15	Friar Lane & Epworth	42	12	12	18	66	86	−20	48	
16	Westfields	42	13	9	20	57	78	−21	48	
17	Causeway United	42	14	5	23	63	72	−9	47	
18	Coalville Town	42	15	2	25	51	83	−32	47	
19	Racing Club Warwick	42	10	8	24	57	88	−31	38	
20	Studley	42	11	5	26	55	86	−31	38	
21	Biddulph Victoria	42	10	8	24	51	84	−33	38	
22	Cradley Town	42	4	6	32	35	129	−94	18	

Source: fchd
Rules for classification: 1) points; 2) goal difference; 3) number of goals scored.
