= 2002–03 Midland Football Alliance =

Midland Football Alliance
- Season: 2002–03
- Champions: Stourbridge
- Relegated: Shifnal Town; Wednesfield
- Matches: 462
- Goals: 1,568 (3.39 per match)

The 2002–03 Midland Football Alliance season was the ninth in the history of Midland Football Alliance, a football competition in England.

== Clubs and league table ==
The league featured 20 clubs from the previous season, along with two new clubs:

- Causeway United, promoted from the West Midlands (Regional) League
- Grosvenor Park, promoted from the Midland Football Combination

Also, Knypersley Victoria changed its name to Biddulph Victoria and Studley B K L changed its name to Studley.

=== League table ===
Pos	Team	Pld	W	D	L	GF	GA	GD	Pts	Promotion or relegation
1	Stourbridge	42	31	8	3	96	27	+69	101	
2	Rushall Olympic	42	31	6	5	94	37	+57	96 (Note: Rushall Olympic deducted 3 points.)	
3	Stratford Town	42	29	6	7	105	38	+67	93	
4	Oadby Town	42	26	7	9	87	52	+35	85	
5	Quorn	42	25	9	8	115	55	+60	84	
6	Willenhall Town	42	23	10	9	91	47	+44	79	
7	Studley	42	24	6	12	97	58	+39	78	
8	Oldbury United	42	22	7	13	88	58	+30	73	
9	Chasetown	42	20	8	14	79	64	+15	68	
10	Grosvenor Park	42	19	10	13	81	58	+23	67	
11	Causeway United	42	18	5	19	70	73	−3	59	
12	Barwell	42	17	7	18	70	68	+2	58	
13	Biddulph Victoria	42	17	6	19	51	69	−18	57	
14	Boldmere St. Michaels	42	16	5	21	59	63	−4	53	
15	Ludlow Town	42	12	8	22	63	76	−13	44	
16	Bridgnorth Town	42	11	9	22	48	79	−31	42	
17	Stafford Town	42	11	8	23	61	93	−32	41	
18	Pelsall Villa	42	10	11	21	64	97	−33	41	
19	Cradley Town	42	8	7	27	43	87	−44	31	
20	Shifnal Town	42	6	7	29	43	93	−50	25	Relegated to the Midland Football Combination
21	Halesowen Harriers	42	4	6	32	44	107	−63	18	Club folded
22	Wednesfield	42	4	0	38	19	169	−150	12	Relegated to the West Midlands (Regional) League

Source: fchd
Rules for classification: 1) points; 2) goal difference; 3) number of goals scored.
