= Marcus Law =

English footballer and manager (born 1975)

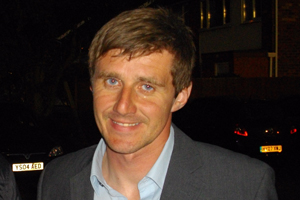
- Law in 2011

Personal information
- Full name: Marcus William Law
- Date of birth: 28 September 1975 (age 51)
- Place of birth: Coventry, England
- Height: 5 ft 11 in (1.80 m)
- Position: Goalkeeper

Senior career*
Years	Team	Apps	(Gls)
1994–1995	Bristol Rovers	2	(0)
- → Yeovil Town (loan)
- Stafford Rangers
- Sacramento Knights

Managerial career
- 1999–2001: Coventry Sphinx
- 2003–2006: Racing Club Warwick
- 2006–2007: Quorn
- 2007–2010: Barwell
- 2010–2011: Kettering Town
- 2011–2013: Tamworth
- 2015: Chasetown
- 2015–2019: Kettering Town
- 2019: Bradford Park Avenue (caretaker)
- * Club domestic league appearances and goals

Marcus William Law (born 28 September 1975) is an English former professional footballer. He has since managed several non-League clubs, including Kettering Town, Tamworth, Coventry Sphinx, Racing Club Warwick, Quorn and Barwell.

== Playing career ==
Born in Coventry, West Midlands, Law started his career as a goalkeeper at Bristol Rovers, making two appearances in the Football League during the 1994–95 season. He then moved into non-league football, playing for Stafford Rangers, before a hip injury forced him into premature retirement whilst playing for the Sacramento Knights in America.

== Managerial career ==
=== Non-League ===
He later went on to manage non-league sides Coventry Sphinx, Racing Club Warwick, Quorn and Barwell. He also spent time coaching in the youth set-ups at Aston Villa and Coventry City. While at Barwell he won the Midland Football Alliance, the highest position they had achieved as a club in their history and started an unbeaten run that eventually stretched to 66 games.

=== Kettering Town ===
His successful run attracted the attention of Conference National side Kettering Town and he was appointed manager on 1 October 2010. Kettering finished 14th in his first season in charge of the club.

=== Tamworth ===
After eight months as manager of Kettering, Law was appointed manager of fellow Conference club Tamworth on a three-year contract on 25 May 2011. Law led Tamworth to the third round of the FA Cup in January 2012 where they lost against Premier League side Everton at Goodison Park. After 19 months in charge at Tamworth, Law was sacked by the club on 14 January 2013.

=== Forest Green Rovers ===
In August 2013, Law joined Forest Green Rovers as a coach on a part-time remit, working alongside Dave Hockaday. He left the club in October 2013 following Hockaday's departure as manager. In March 2014 he revealed he had applied for the vacant job at Wrexham and was keen on a return to management.

=== Chasetown ===
On 26 January 2015, Law joined Chasetown as their new manager giving him the return to management he desired after working as a scout with professional football clubs.

=== Kettering Town ===
Following Kettering Town's promotion to the Southern Premier Division and the departure of joint managers Thomas Baillie and Scott Machin, the club appointed Law as manager in May 2015. Despite winning the Southern League Premier Central division in 2018–19, Law left the club in June 2019.

== Honours ==
=== Club ===
Quorn

- Midland Football Alliance (promotion): 2006–07

Barwell

- Midland Football Alliance: 2009–10

Kettering Town

- Premier Division Central: 2018–19
- Division One Central: 2014–15
