= 2006–07 West Midlands (Regional) League =

The 2006–07 West Midlands (Regional) League season was the 107th in the history of the West Midlands (Regional) League, an English association football competition for semi-professional and amateur teams based in the West Midlands county, Shropshire, Herefordshire, Worcestershire and southern Staffordshire. It has three divisions, the highest of which is the Premier Division, which sits at step 6 of the National League System, or the tenth level of the overall English football league system.

== Premier Division ==
West Midlands League Premier Division
- Season: 2006–07
- Champions: Shifnal Town
- Promoted: Shifnal Town
- Matches: 420
- Goals: 1,372 (3.27 per match)

The Premier Division featured 18 clubs which competed in the division last season, along with four new clubs:

- Bridgnorth Town, transferred from the Midland Combination
- Dudley Sports, transferred from the Midland Combination
- Ellesmere Rangers, promoted from Division One
- Shifnal Town, transferred from the Midland Combination

=== League table ===
Pos	Team	Pld	W	D	L	GF	GA	GD	Pts	Promotion or relegation
1	Shifnal Town	40	27	7	6	100	27	+73	88	Promoted to the Midland Football Alliance
2	Tividale	40	22	12	6	84	49	+35	78	
3	Bewdley Town	40	20	15	5	92	55	+37	75	
4	Gornal Athletic	40	20	10	10	61	47	+14	70	
5	Dudley Town	40	20	7	13	67	46	+21	67	
6	Goodrich	40	21	4	15	83	69	+14	67	
7	Bridgnorth Town	40	20	9	11	83	49	+34	66 (Note: Bridgnorth Town deducted 3 points)	
8	Lye Town	40	19	9	12	83	57	+26	66	
9	Pelsall Villa	40	15	12	13	70	69	+1	57	
10	Wellington	40	15	10	15	66	73	−7	55	
11	Dudley Sports	40	14	9	17	56	58	−2	51	
12	Ellesmere Rangers	40	15	5	20	57	68	−11	50	
13	Wednesfield	40	13	9	18	46	76	−30	48	
14	Wyrley Rangers	40	12	10	18	50	68	−18	46	Club folded
15	Brierley & Hagley	40	12	7	21	55	80	−25	43	
16	Ledbury Town	40	12	5	23	51	97	−46	41	
17	Wolverhampton Casuals	40	9	13	18	53	72	−19	40	
18	Bromyard Town	40	11	7	22	56	83	−27	40	
19	Ludlow Town	40	11	7	22	49	78	−29	40	
20	Bustleholme	40	10	9	21	55	69	−14	39	
21	Shawbury United	40	10	8	22	55	82	−27	38	
22	Great Wyrley	0	0	0	0	0	0	0	0	Club folded, record expunged

Source: fchd
Rules for classification: 1) points; 2) goal difference; 3) number of goals scored.
