= Birmingham Youth Cup =

The Birmingham Youth Cup (Saturday & Sunday Combined) is a defunct cup competition which was run by the Birmingham County F.A for football teams that competed in an affiliated or sanctioned league throughout the Birmingham F.A.
The competition was an inter league competition which seen Saturday and Sunday football teams compete amongst each other.

== Youth Cup Finalists ==
The Youth Cup (sat & sun) is a defunct County Cup which started in the 1964/65 season. The 1992/93 season was the final season for this particular competition (reason not known)

=== Results ===
Birmingham FA Minor Cup winners
Season	Winner	Score	Runners Up
1964-65	Coventry City	2-1	Bentley Road Sports
1965-66	Coventry Wood End	4-1	Mile Oak Rovers YC
1966-67	Coventry Wood End	4-0	Sandon Rangers
1967-68	Brookhill	1-0	Warwicks Juniors
1968-69	Sporting Club (Northfield)	4-2	Chelmsley Town
1969-70	Northfield Juniors	4-1	Inter Volante
1970-71	Northfield Juniors	5-3 (AET)	Billesley Carnegie
1971-72	Northfield Juniors	5-1	Northfield Rangers
1972-73	Oldbury United Colts	2-0	Northfield Juniors
1973-74	Oldswinford	6-0	Tipton Town
1974-75	NOT KNOWN	?-?	NOT KNOWN
1975-76	Solihull Borough	4-1	Kingsbury United Juniors
1976-77	Northfield Terriers	2-1	Sutton Coldfield Town
1977-78	Northfield	4-2	Solihull Unity
1978-79	Alvechurch	2-1	Oldswinford
1979-80	Sutton Coldfield Town	3-1	Nuneaton Borough
1980-81	Sutton Coldfield Town	3-1	Cubbington Albion
1981-82	Nuneaton Borough	3-0	Northfield Town^{[A]}
1982-83	Dudley Town	4-3 (AET)	Northfield Town^{[A]}
1983-84	Oldbury United	4-1	Moor Green Juniors
1984-85	Catholic Community Centre	7-1	AP Leamington
1985-86	Hall Green St Michaels	2-1	Northfield Town^{[A]}
1986-87	Burton Albion	2-1	Sutton Coldfield Town
1987-88	Northfield Town	4-1	Bustleholme
1988-89	Lye Town	2-1	St Annes
1989-90	Tamworth	3-2	Rushall Olympic
1990-91	Nuneaton Borough	5-1	Binley Woods
1991-92	Burton Albion	5-0	Mount Nod Highway
1992-93	Burton Albion	4-0	Jaguar

== Results by team ==
Results by team
Club	Wins	First final won	Last final won	Runners-up	Last final lost	Total final appearances
Northfield Town / Juniors^{[A]}	4	1970	1988	4	1986	8
Burton Albion	3	1987	1993	0	–	3
Sutton Coldfield Town	2	1980	1981	2	1987	4
Nuneaton Borough	2	1982	1991	1	1980	3
Coventry Wood End	2	1966	1967	0	–	2
Oldswinford	1	1974	1974	1	1979	2
Coventry City	1	1965	1965	0	–	1
Brookhill	1	1968	1968	0	–	1
Sporting Club (Northfield)	1	1969	1969	0	–	1
Oldbury United Colts	1	1973	1973	0	–	1
Chapelfield Colts	1	1973	1973	0	–	1
Solihull Borough	1	1976	1976	0	–	1
Northfield Terriers	1	1977	1977	0	–	1
Northfield	1	1978	1978	0	–	1
Alvechurch	1	1979	1979	0	–	1
Dudley Town	1	1983	1983	0	–	1
Oldbury United	1	1984	1984	0	–	1
Catholic Community Centre	1	1985	1985	0	–	1
Hall Green St.Michaels	1	1986	1986	0	–	1
Lye Town	1	1989	1989	0	–	1
Tamworth	1	1990	1990	0	–	1
Bentley Road Sports	0	–	–	1	1965	1
Mile Oak Rovers YC	0	–	–	1	1966	1
Sandon Rangers	0	–	–	1	1967	1
Warwicks Juniors	0	–	–	1	1968	1
Chelmsley Town	0	–	–	1	1969	1
Inter Volante	0	–	–	1	1970	1
Billesley Carnegie	0	–	–	1	1971	1
Northfield Rangers	0	–	–	1	1972	1
Tipton Town	0	–	–	1	1974	1
Kingsbury United Juniors	0	–	–	1	1976	1
Solihull Unity	0	–	–	1	1978	1
Cubbington Albion	0	–	–	1	1981	1
Moor Green Youth	0	–	–	1	1984	1
AP Leamington	0	–	–	1	1985	1
Bustleholme	0	–	–	1	1988	1
St Annes	0	–	–	1	1989	1
Rushall Olympic	0	–	–	1	1990	1
Binley Woods	0	–	–	1	1991	1
Mount Nod Highway	0	–	–	1	1992	1
Jaguar	0	–	–	1	1993	1

== Notes ==
- A. Northfield Juniors and Northfield Town are the same team just with a different suffix added. (See Junior Honours on citation)
