= 1998–99 Southern Football League =

The 1998–99 Southern Football League season was the 96th in the history of the league, an English football competition.

Nuneaton Borough won the Premier Division and earned promotion to the Football Conference. Hastings Town, Gresley Rovers and Bromsgrove Rovers were relegated from the Premier Division, whilst Havant & Waterlooville, Clevedon Town, Margate and Newport County were promoted from the Southern and Midland Divisions, the former two as champions. Bloxwich Town and Brackley Town were relegated to the eighth level whilst Andover resigned from the league.

At the end of the season Midland Division was renamed Western Division, and Southern Division was renamed Eastern Division.

== Premier Division ==
The Premier Division consisted of 22 clubs, including 18 clubs from the previous season and four new clubs:

- Two clubs promoted from the Midland Division:
  - Grantham Town
  - Ilkeston Town
- Plus:
  - Boston United, transferred from the Northern Premier League
  - Weymouth, promoted from the Southern Division

=== League table ===
Southern Football League Premier Division
- Season: 1998–99
- Champions: Nuneaton Borough
- Promoted: Nuneaton Borough
- Relegated: Bromsgrove Rovers; Gresley Rovers
- Matches: 462
- Goals: 1,266 (2.74 per match)

Pos	Team	Pld	W	D	L	GF	GA	GD	Pts	Promotion or relegation
1	Nuneaton Borough	42	27	9	6	91	33	+58	90	Promoted to the Football Conference
2	Boston United	42	17	16	9	69	51	+18	67	
3	Ilkeston Town	42	18	13	11	72	59	+13	67	
4	Bath City	42	18	11	13	70	44	+26	65	
5	Hastings Town	42	18	11	13	57	49	+8	65	Demoted to the Eastern Division
6	Gloucester City	42	18	11	13	57	52	+5	65	
7	Worcester City	42	18	9	15	58	54	+4	63	
8	Halesowen Town	42	17	11	14	72	60	+12	62	
9	Tamworth	42	19	5	18	60	67	−7	62	
10	King's Lynn	42	17	10	15	53	46	+7	61	
11	Crawley Town	42	17	10	15	57	58	−1	61	
12	Salisbury City	42	16	12	14	56	61	−5	60	
13	Burton Albion	42	17	7	18	58	52	+6	58	
14	Weymouth	42	14	14	14	56	53	+3	56	
15	Merthyr Tydfil	42	15	8	19	52	62	−10	53	
16	Atherstone United	42	12	14	16	47	52	−5	50	
17	Grantham Town	42	14	8	20	51	58	−7	50	
18	Dorchester Town	42	11	15	16	49	63	−14	48	
19	Rothwell Town	42	13	9	20	47	67	−20	48	
20	Cambridge City	42	11	12	19	47	68	−21	45	
21	Gresley Rovers	42	12	8	22	49	73	−24	44	Relegated to the Western Division
22	Bromsgrove Rovers	42	8	7	27	38	84	−46	30 (Note: Bromsgrove Rovers were deducted one point.)	Relegated to the Western Division

Source: fchd.com rsssf.com
Rules for classification: 1) points; 2) goal difference; 3) number of goals scored.

== Midland Division ==
The Midland Division consisted of 22 clubs, including 16 clubs from the previous season and six new clubs:

- Four clubs transferred from the Southern Division:
  - Cinderford Town
  - Clevedon Town
  - Newport
  - Weston-super-Mare
- Plus:
  - Bloxwich Town, promoted from the Midland Alliance
  - Stamford, promoted from the United Counties League

At the end of the season Midland Division was renamed Western Division.

=== League table ===
Southern Football League Midland Division
- Season: 1998–99
- Champions: Clevedon Town
- Promoted: Clevedon Town; Newport
- Relegated: Bloxwich Town
- Matches: 462
- Goals: 1,396 (3.02 per match)

Pos	Team	Pld	W	D	L	GF	GA	GD	Pts	Promotion or relegation
1	Clevedon Town	42	28	8	6	83	35	+48	92	Promoted to the Premier Division
2	Newport	42	26	7	9	92	51	+41	85	Promoted to the Premier Division
3	Redditch United	42	22	12	8	81	45	+36	75 (Note: Redditch United were deducted three points.)	
4	Hinckley United	42	20	12	10	58	40	+18	72	
5	Stafford Rangers	42	21	8	13	92	61	+31	71	
6	Bilston Town	42	20	11	11	79	69	+10	71	
7	Solihull Borough	42	19	12	11	76	53	+23	69	
8	Moor Green	42	20	7	15	70	61	+9	67	
9	Blakenall	42	17	14	11	65	54	+11	65	
10	Shepshed Dynamo	42	17	12	13	62	54	+8	63	
11	Sutton Coldfield Town	42	17	8	17	46	57	−11	59	
12	Stourbridge	42	16	10	16	60	54	+6	58	
13	Evesham United	42	16	9	17	64	63	+1	57	
14	Wisbech Town	42	16	9	17	59	66	−7	57	Transferred to the Eastern Division
15	Weston-super-Mare	42	15	10	17	59	56	+3	55	
16	Bedworth United	42	15	9	18	63	52	+11	54	
17	Cinderford Town	42	13	8	21	61	74	−13	47	
18	Stamford	42	13	7	22	60	75	−15	46	Transferred to the Eastern Division
19	Paget Rangers	42	11	12	19	49	58	−9	45	
20	VS Rugby	42	12	9	21	53	74	−21	45	Transferred to the Eastern Division
21	Racing Club Warwick	42	5	8	29	38	93	−55	23	
22	Bloxwich Town	42	1	2	39	26	151	−125	5	Relegated to the Midland Alliance

Source: fchd.com rsssf.com
Rules for classification: 1) points; 2) goal difference; 3) number of goals scored.

== Southern Division ==
The Southern Division consisted of 22 clubs, including 13 clubs from the previous season and nine new clubs, relegated from the Premier Division:

- Three clubs relegated from the Premier Division:
  - Ashford Town (Kent)
  - Sittingbourne
  - St. Leonards Stamcroft, who also changed name to St. Leonards.
- Three clubs transferred from the Midland Division:
  - Brackley Town
  - Corby Town
  - Raunds Town
- Plus:
  - Andover, promoted from the Wessex League
  - Folkestone Invicta, promoted from the Kent League
  - Havant & Waterlooville, new club formed as a merger of Havant Town and Waterlooville

At the end of the season Southern Division was renamed Eastern Division.

=== League table ===
Southern Football League Southern Division
- Season: 1998–99
- Champions: Havant & Waterlooville
- Promoted: Havant & Waterlooville; Margate
- Relegated: Brackley Town
- Matches: 462
- Goals: 1,358 (2.94 per match)

Pos	Team	Pld	W	D	L	GF	GA	GD	Pts	Promotion or relegation
1	Havant & Waterlooville	42	29	7	6	85	32	+53	94	Promoted to the Premier Division
2	Margate	42	27	8	7	84	33	+51	89	Promoted to the Premier Division
3	Folkestone Invicta	42	26	8	8	92	47	+45	86	
4	Newport (Isle of Wight)	42	23	7	12	68	40	+28	76	
5	Chelmsford City	42	20	12	10	91	51	+40	72	
6	Raunds Town	42	19	13	10	87	50	+37	70	
7	Ashford Town (Kent)	42	17	12	13	59	54	+5	63	
8	Baldock Town	42	17	9	16	60	59	+1	60	
9	Fisher Athletic	42	16	11	15	58	52	+6	59	
10	Bashley	42	17	7	18	74	77	−3	58	
11	Witney Town	42	15	12	15	56	48	+8	57	
12	Cirencester Town	42	16	8	18	61	66	−5	56	Transferred to the Western Division
13	Sittingbourne	42	12	18	12	54	56	−2	54	
14	Dartford	42	14	10	18	48	54	−6	52	
15	Erith & Belvedere	42	15	7	20	48	64	−16	52	
16	Tonbridge Angels	42	12	15	15	48	59	−11	51	
17	St. Leonards	42	14	8	20	57	72	−15	50	
18	Fleet Town	42	12	11	19	54	72	−18	47	
19	Corby Town	42	10	10	22	48	73	−25	40	
20	Yate Town	42	10	7	25	37	79	−42	37	Transferred to the Western Division
21	Andover	42	6	10	26	48	115	−67	28	Resigned to the Wessex League
22	Brackley Town	42	6	8	28	41	105	−64	26	Relegated to the Hellenic League

Source: fchd.com rsssf.com
Rules for classification: 1) points; 2) goal difference; 3) number of goals scored.

== Cup competition ==
The league's cup competition, the Dr Martens League Cup, was won by Sutton Coldfield Town, who beat Cambridge City 2–1 on aggregate in the final. The first round, semi-finals and final were played over two legs with the second, third and fourth rounds going to a replay if the tie finished all square. Cambridge had beaten Dorchester Town 4–3 on aggregate to reach the final and Sutton Coldfield defeated Boston United 2–1 on aggregate to reach the final.

== See also ==
- Southern Football League
- 1998–99 Isthmian League
- 1998–99 Northern Premier League
