= 2001–02 West Midlands (Regional) League =

The 2001–02 West Midlands (Regional) League season was the 102nd in the history of the West Midlands (Regional) League, an English association football competition for semi-professional and amateur teams based in the West Midlands county, Shropshire, Herefordshire, Worcestershire and southern Staffordshire.

== Premier Division ==
West Midlands League Premier Division
- Season: 2001–02
- Champions: Causeway United
- Promoted: Causeway United
- Matches: 552
- Goals: 1,820 (3.3 per match)

The Premier Division featured 22 clubs which competed in the division last season, along with two new clubs:

- Ledbury Town, promoted from Division One South
- Wolverhampton United, promoted from Division One North

Also, Brierley Hill Town changed name to Brierley & Hagley and Warley Rangers changed name to Smethwick Rangers.

=== League table ===
Pos	Team	Pld	W	D	L	GF	GA	GD	Pts	Promotion or relegation
1	Causeway United	46	29	12	5	107	55	+52	99	Promoted to the Midland Football Alliance
2	Tividale	46	27	10	9	94	57	+37	88 (Note: Tividale deducted three points.)	
3	Wolverhampton Casuals	46	26	8	12	89	69	+20	86	
4	Little Drayton Rangers	46	24	13	9	98	54	+44	85	
5	Westfields	46	24	9	13	89	53	+36	81	
6	Ledbury Town	46	26	3	17	103	85	+18	81	
7	Star	46	24	8	14	91	65	+26	80	Resigned from the league
8	Kington Town	46	20	14	12	76	42	+34	74	
9	Malvern Town	46	20	11	15	87	57	+30	71	
10	Heath Hayes	46	19	13	14	60	54	+6	70	
11	Tipton Town	46	19	12	15	76	50	+26	69	
12	Brierley & Hagley	46	18	15	13	74	60	+14	69	
13	Wellington	46	18	11	17	63	69	−6	65	
14	Lye Town	46	16	15	15	59	47	+12	63	
15	Ettingshall Holy Trinity	46	16	13	17	66	73	−7	61	
16	Bustleholme	46	16	10	20	80	92	−12	58	
17	Wolverhampton United	46	15	11	20	79	81	−2	56	
18	Shawbury United	46	13	14	19	69	83	−14	53	
19	Darlaston Town	46	13	12	21	69	99	−30	51	Demoted to Division One North
20	Bromyard Town	46	11	10	25	73	97	−24	43	
21	Gornal Athletic	46	7	15	24	54	113	−59	36	
22	Smethwick Rangers	46	11	3	32	70	147	−77	36	
23	Walsall Wood	46	7	12	27	52	96	−44	33	
24	Dudley Town	46	3	6	37	42	122	−80	15	

Source: fchd
Rules for classification: 1) points; 2) goal difference; 3) number of goals scored.
