= Bloxwich United =

Bloxwich United may refer to one of two English association football clubs:

- Bloxwich United F.C., which existed between 2001 and 2002
- Bloxwich United A.F.C., which adopted the name in 2008
