= Barwell Athletic F.C. =

Barwell Athletic
- Full name: Barwell Athletic Football Club
- Dissolved: 1992

Barwell Athletic F.C. was an English association football club based in Barwell, England.

== History ==
The club entered the FA Cup on four occasions, but never went further than the 1st Qualifying Round.

In 1992 they merged with Hinckley F.C. to form Barwell F.C.
