= Chelmsley Town F.C. =

Association football club in England

Coordinates: 52.482584°N 1.6983975°W

Chelmsley Town
- Full name: Chelmsley Town Football Club
- Founded: 1927
- Ground: Pack Meadow, Coleshill
- League: Midland League Division One
- 2024–25: Midland League Division One, 19th of 22
Home colours

Chelmsley Town Football Club is a football club representing the town of Chelmsley Wood, West Midlands, England. They are currently members of the Midland League Division One and play at Pack Meadow in nearby Coleshill.

== History ==
The club was established in 1927 by members of the Christ Church Bible Class under the name Christchurch Football Club. They joined the Handsworth League and later became members of the Mercian League. The club won the Mercian League Premier Division title in 1964–65 and 1966–67, before being renamed Chelmsley Town in 1968. After winning the Premier Division again in 1972, they joined Division Two of the Midland Combination. They won the league's Presidents Cup in 1977–78 and the Invitation Cup the following season. Division Two was renamed Division One in 1983 and the club were Division One champions in 1987–88, earning promotion to the Premier Division.

Chelmsley remained in the Premier Division until being demoted at the end of the 1995–96 season due to a lack of floodlights. They were relegated again in 1999–2000 after finishing bottom of Division One, and went on to finish bottom of Division Two in 2002–03 and 2003–04. In 2011–12 the club won the league's Challenge Vase and finished third in Division Two, resulting in promotion to Division One. In 2014 the Midland Combination merged with the Midland Alliance to form the Midland League, with Chelmsley placed in Division Two. In 2015–16 they were Division Two runners-up, earning promotion to Division One.

== Ground ==
The club initially played at Summerfield Park on Selwyn Road in Ladywood, where they remained until World War II, when the ground was requisition for used by a school. The club temporarily relocated to Rookery Park on Spring Lane in Erdington, before moving to Wallace Road in Selly Park. After 19 years at Wallace Road they moved to the grounds of the Colehill Hall Hospital in Coleshill, although first team matches were played at Chelmsley Hospital in Marston Green.

Chelmsley played at Northfield Town's Shenley Lane during the 2012–13 after a fire at their Marston Green ground. They later relocated to Coleshill Town's Pack Meadow ground.

== Honours ==
- Midland Combination
  - Division One champions 1987–88
  - Challenge Vase winners 2011–12
  - Presidents Cup winners 1977–78
  - Invitation Cup winners 1978–79
- Mercian League
  - Premier Division champions 1964–65, 1966–67, 1971–72

== Records ==
- Best FA Vase performance: First round, 1975–76, 2016–17

== See also ==
- Chelmsley Town F.C. players
