= Kings Norton Town F.C. =

Kings Norton Town
- Full name: Kings Norton Football Club
- Nickname(s): Kings
- Dissolved: 2000
- Ground: Triplex Sports Ground; Kings Norton
- League: Midland Alliance
- 1999–2000: Midland Alliance, 18th (folded)
Home colours

Kings Norton Town F.C. was an English association football club based in Kings Norton, Birmingham. They entered the Midland Combination in 1991 and quickly rose up the leagues during the mid-1990s, reaching the Midland Alliance by 1997. After entering the FA Cup for the first time in 1999, the club folded in 2000.

== History ==
Originally known as Swift Personalised Products F.C., the club entered the Midland Football Combination Division Two in 1991. After changing their name to Richmond Swifts F.C. in 1994, the club won three successive promotions to take it to the Midland Alliance in 1997. The club then changed its name to Kings Norton Town, and finished runners-up in 1998–99. In 1999–2000, Kings Norton entered the FA Cup for the first time, but failed to make it beyond the preliminary qualifying rounds. At the end of the season, the club folded.

== Colours ==
The club wore white shirts and shorts with red trim, and red socks.

== Ground ==
The team originally played at Wythall Park, and later played at the Triplex Sports Ground in Kings Norton; during their time in the Midland Football Alliance they ground shared with Redditch United.

== Honours ==
- Midland Alliance
  - Runners-up 1998–99
- Midland Combination Premier Division
  - Champions 1996–97
- Midland Combination Division One
  - Champions 1995–96
- Midland Combination Division Two
  - Champions 1994–95

== Records ==
- FA Cup
  - Preliminary Round 1999–2000
- FA Vase
  - First Round 1999–2000
