= Feckenham F.C. =

Association football club in England

Coordinates: 52.274304°N 1.8988739°W

Feckenham
- Full name: Feckenham Football Club
- Nickname: The Millers
- Founded: 1881
- Dissolved: 2025
- Ground: Mill Lane, Feckenham
Home colours

Feckenham Football Club was a football club based in Feckenham, near Redditch, Worcestershire, England. They played at Mill Lane.

== History ==
The club was established in 1881 They were founder members of the Redditch & District League and were league champions in 1920–21. The club then moved up to the Worcester & District League, which they won in 1955–56 and 1962–63. They also won the Worcester Minor Cup in 1978–79.

After winning the league again in 1994–95, Feckenham moved up to Division Three of the Midland Combination. They won Division Three at the first attempt and were promoted to Division Two. The club went on to win Division Two in 1996–97 to earn a second successive promotion, this time to Division One. A third successive promotion was secured when they finished third in Division One the 1997–98, resulting in promotion to the Premier Division.

At the end of the 2007–08 season Feckenham dropped two divisions, replacing their reserve team in Division Two. They were Division Two runners-up in 2010–11 and were promoted back to Division One. When the Midland Combination merged with the Midland Alliance to form the Midland League in 2014, Feckenham became members of Division Two of the new league. The club left the league at the end of the curtailed 2020–21 season. They subsequently joined Division Two West of the Hellenic League for the 2022–23 season, before transferring to Division Three of the Midland League at the end of the season.

The club folded at the end of the 2024–25 season.

== Ground ==
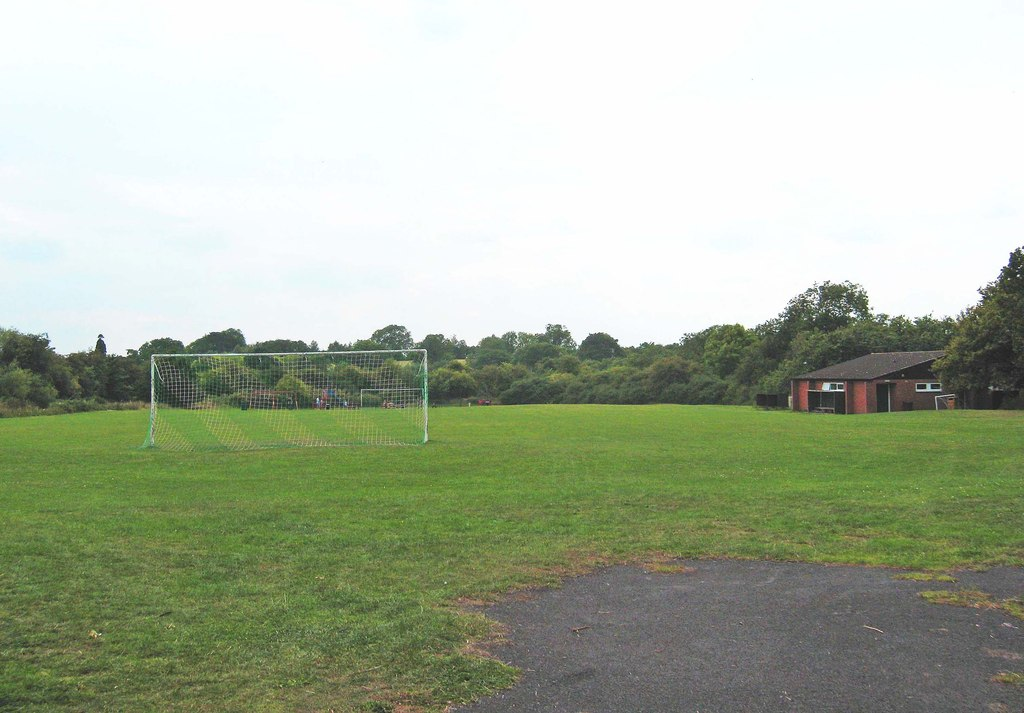
Feckenham Football Club ground

The club played at Mill Lane until the first team were required to relocate in 1998 as the ground could not be brought up to the standard required to play in the Midland Combination Premier Division. They initially groundshared at Evesham United's Common Road ground, before moving to the Valley Stadium owned by Redditch United. After the club dropped out of the Premier Division in 2008, they returned to Mill Lane before moving to the Studley Sports & Social Club.

== Honours ==
- Midland Combination
  - Division Two champions 1996–97
  - Division Three champions 1995–96
- Worcester & District League
  - Champions 1955–56, 1962–63, 1994–95
  - Baylis Cup winners 1994–95
- Redditch & District League
  - Champions 1920–21
- Worcestershire Minor Cup
  - Winners 1978–79
- Smedley Crooke Memorial Challenge Cup
  - Winner 1995–96, 1996–97

== See also ==
- Feckenham F.C. players
