= Bloxwich Town F.C. =

Association football club in England

Coordinates: 52.609511°N 2.0001139°W

Bloxwich Town
- Full name: Bloxwich Town Football Club
- Founded: 1976 (original club); 2002 (reformed club); 2016 (second reformation)
- Dissolved: 2001 (merger); 2005; 2018 (second reformation)
- Ground: Red Lion Ground, Bloxwich

Bloxwich Town Football Club was a football club based in Bloxwich, West Midlands, England, based at The Red Lion Ground.

== History ==
The original club was established in 1976 as Peel Football Club, representing the Sir Robert Peel pub. They joined the Bloxwich Combination and were Division One runners-up in 1977–78, as well as winning the Alan Peck Memorial Cup. The club was then renamed Carvers Football Club for sponsorship purposes, going on to win the Division One title and retain the Alan Peck Memorial Cup in 1978–79. They were then renamed again, becoming Bloxwich Association Football Club, with the first season under the new name seeing them retain the league and cup titles. After a third successive league and cup double in 1980–81, the club moved up to Division One of the Staffordshire County League (South).

Bloxwich won Division One of the Staffordshire County League (South) at the first attempt, also reaching the League Cup final. They moved up to Division Two of the Midland Combination in 1983. Despite only finishing eleventh, the club were promoted to the Premier Division at the end of the 1984–85 season due to the quality of their Abbey Park ground. However, after finishing bottom of the Premier Division in 1987–88, they were relegated back to Division One. In 1988 the club was renamed Bloxwich Town Association Football Club, taking the name of a club that had played in the West Midlands (Regional) League a year earlier. The newly renamed club went on to win the Division One title in 1988–89 and were promoted back to the Premier Division.

In 1994–95 Bloxwich Town were runners-up in the Premier Division. They went on to win the Premier Division title the following season, earning promotion to the Midland Alliance. Two seasons later the club were Midland Alliance champions and were promoted to the Midland Division of the Southern League. However, the promotion coincided with the withdrawal of the club's financial backers, leading to almost all players leaving; as a result, the team finished bottom of the Midland Division in 1998–99, suffering an immediate relegation back to the Midland Alliance. At the end of the 2000–01 season the club merged with Blakenall to form Bloxwich United, with the new club playing at Blakenall's Red Lion Ground, although the eventual plan was to sell off the Red Lion ground and upgrade Abbey Park. However, the new club folded midway through the 2001–02 season.

A new Bloxwich Town club was formed for the 2002–03 season, joining Division One of the Midland Combination. After finishing seventh in 2003–04, they were promoted to the Premier Division. However, the club folded again at the end of the 2004–05 season. In 2016 another Bloxwich Town emerged when Midland League club Rostance Edwards were renamed. Rostance Edwards had joined Division Two of the Midland Combination from the Wolverhampton Combination in 2013. When the Midland Combination merged with the Midland Alliance to form the Midland League in 2014, the club were placed in Division Three. They were Division Three runners-up in 2014–15, earning promotion to Division Two.

== Ground ==
The original club initially played at the King George V Memorial Playing Fields. They moved to Abbey Park in 1981 and new stands were built and floodlights installed in the early 1990s. The club returned to Abbey Park after being reformed in 2002. The modern club played at the Red Lion Ground, formerly home to Bloxwich United.

== Honours ==
- Midland Alliance
  - Champions 1997–98
- Midland Combination
  - Premier Division champions 1995–96
  - Division One champions 1988–89
  - Premier Division Cup winners 1989–90, 1995–96
  - Invitation Cup winners 1988–89
  - Tony Allden Memorial Cup winners 1995–96
- Walsall Senior Cup
  - Winners 1996–97
- Staffordshire County League (South)
  - Division One champions 1981–82
- Bloxwich Combination
  - Division One champions 1978–79, 1979–80, 1980–81
  - Alan Peck Memorial Cup winners 1977–78, 1978–79, 1979–80, 1980–81
- Bloxwich Charity Cup
  - Winners 1979–80

== Records ==
- Best FA Cup performance: First qualifying round, 1998–99
- Best FA Trophy performance: First round, 1998–99
- Best FA Vase performance: Third round, 1997–98

== See also ==
- Bloxwich Town F.C. players
