= Barwell F.C. =

English football club

Coordinates: 52°34′21.709″N 1°20′28.320″W

Barwell
- Full name: Barwell Football Club
- Nickname: The Canaries
- Short name: Barwell
- Founded: 1992
- Ground: Kirkby Road, Barwell
- Capacity: 2,500 (256 seated)
- Chairman: Dave Laing
- Manager: Damion Beckford-Quailey and Andy Wilson
- League: Northern Premier League Division One Midlands
- 2025–26: Southern League Premier Division Central, 20th of 22 (relegated)
Home colours	Away colours

Barwell Football Club is a football club based in Barwell, near Hinckley in Leicestershire, England. They are currently members of the Northern Premier League Division One Midlands and play at Kirkby Road.

== History ==
The club was established in 1992 as a merger of Hinckley of the Midland Combination Premier Division and Barwell Athletic of the Leicestershire Senior League Premier Division; the new club took Hinckley's place in the Midland Combination.

In 1994 Barwell were founder members of the Midland Alliance. They won the Leicestershire and Rutland Senior Cup in 1996–97 and the League Cup in 2005–06, beating Leamington 3–1 in the final. After finishing as runners-up in 2008–09, they won the league the following season, earning promotion to Division One South of the Northern Premier League. Their first season in the division saw them win the title, earning promotion to step three of the National League System. Instead of playing in the Northern Premier League's Premier Division, the club were moved to the Premier Division of the Southern League. However, two seasons later, they were transferred back to the Northern Premier League.

In 2015–16 Barwell reached the first round of the FA Cup for the first time, losing 2–0 at home to Welling United. The following season saw them win the Leicestershire and Rutland Challenge Cup, beating Coalville Town 3–1 in the final. The club was transferred to the Premier Division Central of the Southern League at the end of the 2017–18 season as part of the restructuring of the non-League pyramid. In 2025–26 they finished third-from-bottom of the Premier Division Central and were relegated to Division One Midlands of the Northern Premier League.

== Ground ==
The club play at Kirkby Road in Barwell. The sports complex also incorporates bowling facilities and a cricket pitch, which was once used for first class matches. Floodlights were installed prior to the 1992–93 season, and a number of seats were obtained from the old main stand at Leicester City's Filbert Street ground. A new covered stand to accommodate five hundred spectators was built prior to the 1996–97 season. Towards the end of the 2000–01 season, a new 256 seater cantilever stand was erected, and the club have made further improvements to allow them to progress up the pyramid. The ground currently has a capacity of 2,500, of which 256 is seated and 750 covered.

== Managerial history ==
Period	Manager
1992–1995	David Callow
1995–1998	Bill Moore
1998–2002	Paul Purser
2003–2004	Alan Hussey
2004–2007	Bob Steel
2007–2010	Marcus Law
2010–2011	Paul O'Brien
2011–2018	Jimmy Ginnelly
2018–2022	Guy Hadland
2022–2024	Ian King
2024–2026	Jimmy Ginnelly
2026–	Damion Beckford-Quailey and Andy Wilson
Source: NLCD

== Honours ==
- Northern Premier League
  - Division One South champions 2010–11
- Midland Alliance
  - Champions 2009–10
  - League Cup winners 2005–06
- Leicestershire and Rutland Senior Cup
  - Winners 1996–97
- Leicestershire and Rutland Challenge Cup
  - Winners 2016–17

== Records ==
- Best FA Cup performance: First round, 2015–16
- Best FA Trophy performance: First round, 2018–19, 2024–25
- Best FA Vase performance: Semi-finals, 2009–10
- Most appearances: Liam Castle
- Most goals: Kev Charley

== See also ==
- Barwell F.C. players
- Barwell F.C. managers
