= Northfield Town F.C. =

Association football club in England

Coordinates: 52°25′27.04″N 1°57′57.90″W

Northfield Town
- Up The Town
- Full name: Northfield Town Football Club
- Nickname: The Town
- Short name: NTFC
- Founded: 1966
- Ground: 'The Lane' @Shenley Lane Community Association
- Capacity: 500
- Chair: Al Jones
- Secretary: Matt Onions
- Management Team: Ryan Smith, Sam Smith, Jack Gauntlett
- League: Midland League Division One
- 2025–26: Midland League Division Two, 1st of 15 (promoted)
- Website: www.facebook.com/NorthfieldTown/
| Home colours | Away colours |

Northfield Town Football Club & Northfield Town Foundation are amateur grassroots football clubs based in the Northfield area in the South of the City of Birmingham,

England. The senior first team play in the Midland League Division One.

The club has junior boys and girls teams, an U18 floodlit team, two open age teams, and two veterans teams playing in various competitions.

== History ==
Although the name of Northfield Town Football Club came into being in 1966, its origins go back to the 1930s, then playing under the name of Allens Cross Football Club, which was part of the Allens Cross Sports Club.

In its early days, the club had two teams Allens Cross F.C. Seniors & Allens Cross F.C. Juniors, the clubs teams had spells in the Kings Norton League, Warwickshire & West Midlands Alliance and the Mercian League, then the senior team joined the Midland Football Combination for the 1956/57 season (then known as the Worcestershire Combination). The senior team won the Midland Football Combination Cup in that first season and then the League Championship in the 1961/62 season. Following an amalgamation with another successful local side, Castle Rovers, the club played briefly as Cross Castle United before adopting the present name, Northfield Town in 1966.

In 2013, Northfield Town F.C. amalgamated with Shenley Radford Youth F.C. to create a youth system. This was the beginning of Northfield Town Juniors F.C. then becoming Northfield Town Foundation in 2025 after gaining charity status.

The 2013/14 season was the last season in the Midland Football Combination, in which 'The Town' finished 13th before entering the newly formed Midland Football League for the 2014/15 season. 'The Town' had some successful seasons from 2013/14 through to 2020/21 reaching cup finals, gaining promotion from Division 3 and becoming the 2018/19 Division 2 Champions. Leading up to the 2021/22 season, following the previous two seasons being hampered by the COVID-19 pandemic, the club reviewed its long term future and made the decision for the senior first team to drop down to the Birmingham and District Football League, in the hope this would help spur the club's growth in the longer term.

The club's development plan started to come to fruition sooner than expected. The senior first team had two successful seasons in the Birmingham and District Football League, so for the 2023/24 season the club applied to go back to the Midland Football League, and subsequently gained promotion from Division 3 that same season. A development team was formed to help players transitioning from U18s football to open age football, which competes in the Birmingham and District Football League, and a girls section at the club was created, with the first girls team playing in the Central Warwickshire Girls Football League. The club's success continued for the 2024/25 season with a first venture into the Midland Floodlit Youth League for the U18 team, and the senior first team winning the Division 2 title in their first season back in the division. The junior section of the club has teams competing in the Midland Junior Premier League, the Central Warwickshire Youth Football League and the Central Warwickshire Girls Football League.

During the 2024/25 season, the club broke the previous record attendance (of 124 people set in the 2016/17 season Vs Montpellier) twice. Firstly Vs Cadbury Athletic, with 151 people attending the match, and then again, on what was viewed as the division two title decider, Vs Knowle F.C. with 393 people attending the match. If Knowle F.C. had won that match, they were the league champions, if Northfield Town won, it meant that the title would not be decided until Northfield Town had played their next two fixtures. Northfield Town won 1-0, and then won the following fixture to be crowned the division two champions.

== Club badge and colours ==
The early clubs history was incorporated into the current club badge, with the X representing Allen's Cross Football Club & the castle representing Castle Rovers.

The club colours changed in 2013 as part of the agreement with the amalgamation with Shenley Radford Youth F.C. The home kits are Black and White vertical stripes with a hint of red in the shirts (Shenley Radford's traditional colours), the away kit is Blue and Yellow (Northfield Town's traditional colours)

For the 2016/17 season and to celebrate 50 years of the club, the senior first team wore the Blue and Yellow kit at home, in honour to the milestone and the clubs history, with the black and white strip being used as an away kit.

== Ground ==
The home games for the Northfield Town F.C. 1st and Development teams, Northfield Town F.C. Veterans teams and the Northfield Town Foundation girls and boys teams are played at 'The Lane' (Shenley Community Association and Sports Centre, Shenley Lane) based in the Selly Oak area of Birmingham. The Northfield Town Foundation U18 floodlit team currently play their home matches at Shenley Academy, based in the Weoley Castle area of Birmingham.

The present sports ground was initially the playing fields for the Allen's Cross Sports Club which was part of the greater Allen's Cross Community Association and they were the "parent body" until 1983, the current body of the sports ground is Shenley Lane Community Association & Sports Centre.

The playing fields were opened for use in 1935, that year King George V and Queen Mary were celebrating the Silver Jubilee of their reign, to mark the event a fund was set up, called the King George V Playing Fields Fund. The Allen's Cross Community Association obtained funds from the Birmingham Branch of the National Playing Fields Association, the Birmingham Civic Society, Bournville Village Trust and other donors.

On 1 April 1937, a 99-year lease for the playing fields was agreed between Cadbury and The Birmingham Common Good Trust to create the Allen's Cross Sports Ground, which was a subsidiary of the Allen's Cross Community Association. At this time work started on a clubhouse pavilion, provided by the Feeney Trust, a tarmac tennis court and a caretaker's house, all of which were officially opened on 27 August 1938 by George Cadbury JR. At this time the sports fields were laid out for two football pitches and one cricket pitch.

When Cadbury formed a partnership with Schweppes in the early 1970s, three of their properties, the Allen's Cross Sports Ground, Weoley Hill Cricket and Tennis Club and the Cadbury Club, were allowed to have a bar. The sports club then went from strength to strength while the Community Hall was struggling and in the red.

Due to the success of the sports ground, the Allen's Cross Sports Club grew and went from strength to strength, which resulted in the committee from sports ground requesting to break away from the Allen's Cross Community Association in 1983. Discussions took place and there was an initial reluctance, Chris Cadbury, then the President of the Association, reluctantly agreed to the request, with the understating that the new organisation become a community association. With that, the sports ground 'broke' from its parent body, the Allen's Cross Community Association. It became a registered charity in its own right and was renamed Shenley Lane Community Association & Sports Centre. It originally consisted of Northfield Town Football Club, Allen's Cross Cricket Club and Shenley Radford Youth Football Club.

At the same time a development plan was put into place and with the help of the Prince's Trust a brand new changing block, entrance, stand and toilets were added. Later an all-weather pitch was built.

Various developments have taken place over recent years, most significantly the security fencing, but are usually limited to "refurbishments" due to limited funds.

From the opening of the sports ground the football club are the only surviving group, although with a name change, playing at the ground from 1938 to the present day. The Allen's Cross Cricket Club played at the ground from 1938 to 2002. There have been various cricket clubs that have rented the cricket pitch from season to season, with more recently a long term renter in Shenley Fields Cricket Club, who formed in 2013, and had been at the sports ground since then, but left following their 2025 season.

== Honours ==
Seniors

- Midland Football League Division 2
  - Champions 2018/19, 2024/25, 2025/26
- Midland Football League Division 3
  - Promotion 2016/17, 2023/24
- Midland Football League Challenge Vase
  - Runners-up 2015/16, 2016/17
- Midland Football Combination Premier Division
  - Champions 1975/76, 1994/95
  - Runners-up 1989/90
- Midland Football Combination Division One
  - Champions 1961/62, 1998/99
  - Runner-up 1997/98, 2005/06, 2006/07
- Midland Football Combination Division Two
  - Champions 1961/62 (Reserves), 1963/64
- Midland Football Combination Cup
  - Winners 1956/57
  - Runner-up 1963/64, 1986/87
- Midland Football Combination Presidents Cup
  - Winners 1961/62, 1980/81
  - Runner-up 1973/74, 2007/08
- Midland Football Combination Challenge Vase
  - Winners 1983/84
- Midland Football Combination Tony Allden Memorial Cup
  - Winners 1976/77
- Midland Football Combination Challenge Trophy
  - Winners 1988/89
- Birmingham & District Football League Division 1
  - Champions 2022/23
  - Promotion 2024/25
- Birmingham & District Football League Division 2
  - Champions 2021/22
  - Promotion 2023/24
- Birmingham & District Football League Holder Cup
  - Champions 2022/23
- Birmingham & District Football League Senior Cup
  - Runners-up 2021/22
- Birmingham & District Football League Intermediate Cup
  - Champions 2021/22
  - Runners-up 2023/24
- Birmingham County Saturday Challenge Vase
  - Winners 2007/08, 2017/18
- Birmingham Saturday Amateur Cup
  - Winners 1958/59, 1961/62
  - Runners-up 1948/49, 1963/64
- Birmingham Sunday Amateur Cup
  - Runners-up 1964/65
- Birmingham Senior Amateur Cup
  - Winners 1974/75
- Lord Mayor of Birmingham Charity Cup
  - Runners-up 1990/91, 1992/93
- Smedley Crooke Memorial Charity Cup
  - Winners 1989/90
  - Runners-up 4 times

Juniors

- Birmingham County Youth Cup _{(Saturday & Sunday combined)}
  - Winners 1969/70, 1970/71, 1971/72, 1987/88
  - Runners-up 1972/73, 1981/82, 1982/83, 1985/86
- Birmingham County Minor Cup (U16s)
  - Winners 1993/94, 1999/00, 2013/14
  - Runners-up 1998/99, 2001/02, 2008/09, 2012/13
- Birmingham A.F.A Youth Cup winners
  - Winners 1989/90, 1990/91, 1991/92, 1993/94
  - Runners-up 1988/89, 1992/93
- Worcestershire County Youth Cup winners
  - 4 times
- Mercian A.F.A. Premier Championship
  - 1982/83
- Mercian A.F.A. Division One Champions
  - 1973/74
- Mercian A.F.A. Senior Cup
  - 1979/80
- Aston Villa Shield
  - Winners 1973/74, 1979/80
- Queens Hospital Cup
  - Winners 1985/86

== Records ==
- FA Vase
  - 3rd Round 1988/89
- Record Attendance
  - 2024/25 season, Saturday 5 April 2025, Vs Knowle F.C. - 393
- Birmingham Youth Cup (Saturday & Sunday Combined)
  - Most times winners - 4
  - Most consecutive wins - 3
  - Most final appearances - 8
