= Coventry Sphinx F.C. =

Association football club in England

Coordinates: 52°24′4.972″N 1°28′19.132″W

Coventry Sphinx
- Full name: Coventry Sphinx Football Club
- Nickname: The Sphinx
- Founded: 1946
- Ground: Sphinx Drive, Coventry
- Chairman: Joey Fletcher
- Manager: Joe Conneely
- League: United Counties League Premier Division South
- 2025–26: Northern Premier League Division One Midlands, 21st of 22 (relegated)
Home colours	Away colours

Coventry Sphinx Football Club is a football club based in Coventry, West Midlands, England. They are currently members of the United Counties League Premier Division South and play at Sphinx Drive.

== History ==
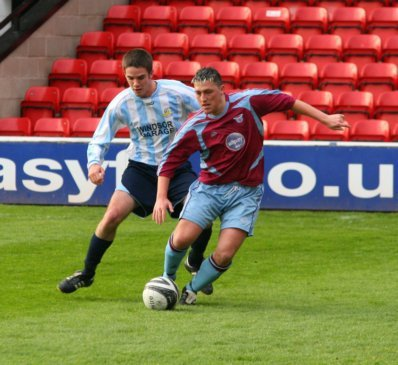
Sphinx (light blue and white) in action against Westfields in 2010

The club was established in 1946 as a works team for Armstrong Siddeley under the name Armstrong Siddeley Motors Football Club. In 1960 they were renamed Sphinx Football Club. The club were founder members of the Coventry Alliance and remained in the league until moving up to Division Two of the Midland Combination in 1993. They finished fourth in their first season in the league, earning promotion to Division One. The club went on to finish as runners-up in Division One in 1994–95, and were promoted to the Premier Division, at which point they adopted their current name.

Coventry Sphinx were Premier Division runners-up in 1995–96 and again in 2001–02, a season which also saw them win the league's Challenge Cup. They went on to finish as runners-up in consecutive seasons in 2004–05 (also winning the Challenge Cup again) and 2005–06 before winning the Premier Division title in 2006–07, earning promotion to the Midland Alliance. In 2009–10 the club won the Midland Alliance League Cup, beating Westfields 3–1 in the final. When the league merged with the Midland Combination in 2014 to form the Midland League in 2014, the club became members of the Premier Division.

At the end of the 2020–21 season Coventry Sphinx were transferred to the Premier Division South of the United Counties League. They were Premier Division South champions in 2022–23, earning promotion to Division One Midlands of the Northern Premier League. In 2025–26 the club finished second-from-bottom of Division One Midlands and were relegated back to the Premier Division South of the United Counties League.

== Ground ==
The club play at Sphinx Drive, the name of which was adopted in 1995. In the mid-1990s a new stand was built and opened with a friendly match against a Coventry City team. The record attendance of 935 was set for a league match against Hereford in 2016.

== Honours ==
- United Counties League
  - Premier Division South champions 2022–23
- Midland Alliance
  - League Cup winners 2009–10
- Midland Combination
  - Premier Division champions 2006–07
  - Challenge Cup winners 2001–02, 2004–05
  - Tony Allden Cup winners 2006–07
- Coventry Evening Telegraph Challenge Cup
  - Winners 1965–66, 2004–05, 2005–06
- Coventry Charity Cup
  - Winners 2006–07
- Birmingham FA Midweek Floodlit Cup
  - Winners 2006–07

== Records ==
- Best FA Cup performance: Third qualifying round, 2009–10
- Best FA Trophy performance: First qualifying round, 2023–24, 2024–25, 2025–26
- Best FA Vase performance: Quarter-finals, 2007–08
- Record attendance: 935 vs Hereford, Midland League Premier Division, 26 April 2016

== See also ==
- Coventry Sphinx F.C. players
- Coventry Sphinx F.C. managers
