= Continental Star F.C. =

Association football club in England

Coordinates: 52.519048°N 1.8900494°W

Continental Star
- Full name: Continental Star Football Club
- Nickname: The Stars
- Founded: 1973
- Ground: The Hub, Perry Barr
- Chairman: Keith John
- Manager: Daniel Moses
- League: Midland League Division Three
- 2024–25: Midland League Division Three, 6th of 15
Home colours	Away colours

Continental Star Football Club is a football club based in the Perry Barr area of Birmingham, West Midlands, England. They are currently members of the Midland League Division Three and play at the Hub on Holford Drive.

== History ==
The club was established in 1973 as Villa Star Football Club. They were renamed Continental Star in 1975 and joined a league for the first time in 1976 when they became members of Division One of the Central Birmingham Alliance. The club were Division One runners-up in their first season, earning promotion to the Premier Division. They went on to win the Premier Division title the following season, as well as the Surry Trophy. The club then joined the Kings Norton League, winning Division One at the first attempt. They subsequently transferred to the Warley Alliance League and won back-to-back league titles in 1979–80 and 1980–81 before moving to Division Four B of the Birmingham Works League.

Continental Star won Division Four B at the first attempt. They went on to win Division Three B, Division Two and Division One B in successive seasons, before finishing as runners-up in Division One A in 1985–86. In 1989–90, the club were Division One champions, also winning the WBA Shield and the Sports Argus Shield. After winning the league's Premier Division, Aston Villa Shield, and WBA Shield in 1992–93, they moved up to Division Three of the Midland Combination. Their first season in Division Three saw them finish as runners-up, earning promotion to Division Two. The club were Division Two champions in 1995–96 and were promoted to Division One. They went on to finish as Division One runners-up the following season, securing promotion to the Premier Division.

Despite finishing bottom of the Premier Division in 2000–01, Continental Star were not relegated. They were renamed Handsworth Continental Star at the end of the season, but reverted to Continental Star in 2002. In 2011–12, they were Premier Division champions and were promoted to the Midland Alliance. When the Midland Alliance merged with the Midland Combination to form the Midland League in 2014, the club were placed in the Premier Division. However, after finishing bottom of the Premier Division in 2015–16, they dropped into Division Two due to moving to a new ground that did not meet Division One standards. In 2016–17, the club finished bottom of Division Two and were relegated to Division Three.

== Ground ==
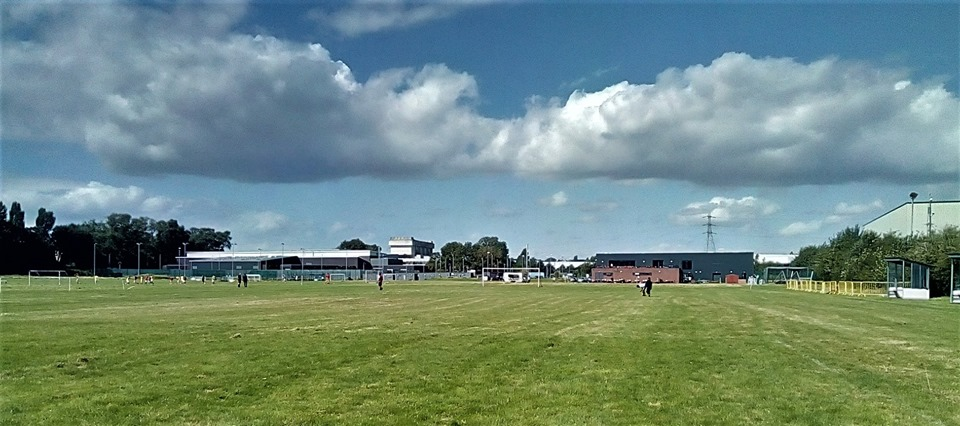
The Hub, Perry Barr

The club has played at numerous grounds since its establishment. In 1999, they relocated from Coleshill Town's Pack Meadow to Paget Rangers' Vale Stadium. In 2001, the club relocated to Newbury Lane in Sandwell when it became vacant after Sandwell Borough folded. They moved to Blakenhall in 2002 and then back to Newbury Lane in 2004. The club later moved to Rushall Olympic's Dale Lane ground, before moving to The Hub in Perry Barr in 2015. The Hub, found near Villa Park, incorporates the football club as well as a tennis club and a boxing club. It was opened with the support of Lincoln Moses MBE, Keith John, and Diane Sawyers, and the trustees of the foundation.

== Honours ==
- Midland Combination
  - Premier Division champions 2011–12
  - Division Two champions 1995–96
  - Charity Shield winners 2012–13
  - Jack Mould Trophy winners 1996–97
- Birmingham Works League
  - Premier Division champions 1992–93
  - Division One champions 1989–90
  - Division One B champions 1984–85
  - Division Two champions 1983–84
  - Division Three B champions 1982–83
  - Division Four B champions 1981–82
  - Aston Villa Shield winners 1992–93
  - WBA Shield winners 1989–90, 1992–93
  - Sports Argus Shield winners 1987–88, 1989–90
  - Wade Victory Cup winners 1982–83
- Warley Alliance League
  - Champions 1979–80, 1980–81
- Kings Norton League
  - Division One champions 1978–79
- Central Birmingham Alliance
  - Premier Division champions 1977–78
  - Surry Trophy winners 1977–78
- JW Hunt Cup
  - Winners 1999–2000

== Records ==
- Best FA Cup performance: Preliminary round, 2011–12, 2012–13, 2015–16
- Best FA Vase performance: First round, 2010–11, 2011–12

== See also ==
- Continental Star F.C. players
