= Dudley Sports F.C. =

Association football club in England

Coordinates: 52.477409°N 2.1317889°W

Dudley Sports
- Full name: Dudley Sports Football Club
- Nickname: The Piemen
- Founded: 1979
- Ground: Hillcrest Avenue, Brierley Hill
- Chairman: James Taylor
- Manager: Daniel Mandley
- League: West Midlands (Regional) League Premier Division
- 2024–25: West Midlands (Regional) League Premier Division, 15th of 15
Home colours	Away colours

Dudley Sports Football Club is a football club based in Dudley, West Midlands, England. They are currently members of the West Midlands (Regional) League Premier Division and play at Hillcrest Avenue in Brierley Hill.

== History ==
The club was established in 1979 after the Marsh & Baxter company folded and was initially named Dudley Employees Sports & Social Club. They joined the Birmingham & District Work and Combination, where they played until joining Division Two of the Midland Combination in 1985. Despite only finishing ninth in their first season in Division Two, the club were promoted to Division One. They won the league's Presidents Cup in 1989–90. The club remained in Division One until 1997, when they were promoted to the Premier Division after a seventh-place finish.

Dudley Sports finished bottom of the Midland Combination Premier Division in 1998–99 and were relegated back to Division One. They returned to the Premier Division after finishing fourth in Division One in 2002–03, a season which also saw them win the Presidents Cup again. In 2006 the club transferred to the Premier Division of the West Midlands (Regional) League, where they have remained since. In 2007–08 they won the Premier Division League Cup, beating Wednesfield 2–1 in the final.

At the end of the 2020–21 season Dudley Sports were transferred to Division One of the Midland League when the Premier Division of the West Midlands (Regional) League lost its status as a step six division. However, they finished bottom of the division in 2021–22 and were relegated to Division One of the West Midlands (Regional) League. In 2023–24 Division One was renamed the Premier Division. The club finished bottom of the Premier Division in 2024–25 but avoided being relegated.

== Honours ==
- West Midlands (Regional) League
  - Premier Division League Cup winners 2007–08
- Midland Combination
  - Presidents Cup winners 1989–90, 2002–03

== Records ==
- Best FA Cup performance: First qualifying round, 2009–10
- Best FA Vase performance: Second qualifying round, 2011–12, 2013–14, 2015–16, 2016–17
