= Massey Ferguson F.C. =

Association football club in England

Coordinates: 52°24′39″N 1°35′41″W

Massey Ferguson
- Full name: Massey Ferguson Football Club
- Nickname: The Tractormen
- Founded: 1956
- Ground: BannerBrook Park; Banner Lane; Tile Hill; Coventry
- Capacity: 50 seated
- Chairman: Lindsey Bailey
- Manager: Kevin Kingham
- League: Coventry Sunday Football League
- 2010–11: Midland Football Combination; Premier Division, 16th (resigned)
Home colours	Away colours

Massey Ferguson Sports & Social F.C. are a football club based in Coventry, England. They joined the Midland Combination Division Two in 1993. They currently play Sunday League football in the Coventry Sunday Football League.

== History ==
Massey Ferguson F.C. was formed in 1956 as the works team for Coventry's Massey Ferguson factory and initially played in the Coventry Works League before becoming founder members of the Coventry Alliance, where they won at least one league title and a number of cups.

For the 1993–94 season the club joined the Midland Football Combination, initially in Division Two, where they were champions at the first attempt, and followed this up by winning the Division One title the following year. They remained in the Premier Division until the end of the 2010–11 season, with a best finish of third in 1995–96.

At the end of the 2010–11 season they resigned from the Midland Combination and took the place of their reserves in the Coventry Alliance in Division Three, eventually switching to playing Sunday league football in the Coventry Sunday Football League.

== Records ==
- Best league performance: 3rd in Midland Combination Premier Division, 1995–96
- Best FA Cup performance: never entered
- Best FA Vase performance: never entered
