= Studley F.C. =

Association football club in England

Coordinates: 52°16′56.15″N 1°53′35.59″W

Studley
- Full name: Studley Football Club
- Nickname: The Bees
- Founded: 1971 (as B.K.L.)
- Ground: The Beehive, Studley
- Manager: Myles Cooper
- League: Hellenic League Division One
- 2025–26: Midland League Premier Division, 18th of 18 (relegated)
Home colours	Away colours

Studley Football Club is a football club based in Studley, near Redditch, Worcestershire, England. They play in the Hellenic League Division One.

== History ==
Studley FC was formed in 1971, playing Sunday football in the local Redditch league, they initially played as B.K.L.. The side was made up mainly of employees of BKL Fittings.

The club was re-launched as Studley Football Club on 2 June 2002, following the collapse of the company BKL. Further developments are planned for the future.

They have reached the first qualifying round of the FA Cup twice, in seasons 2003–04 and 2008–09.

The club was crowned champions of the Hellenic League Division One for the 2021–22 season.

== Ground ==
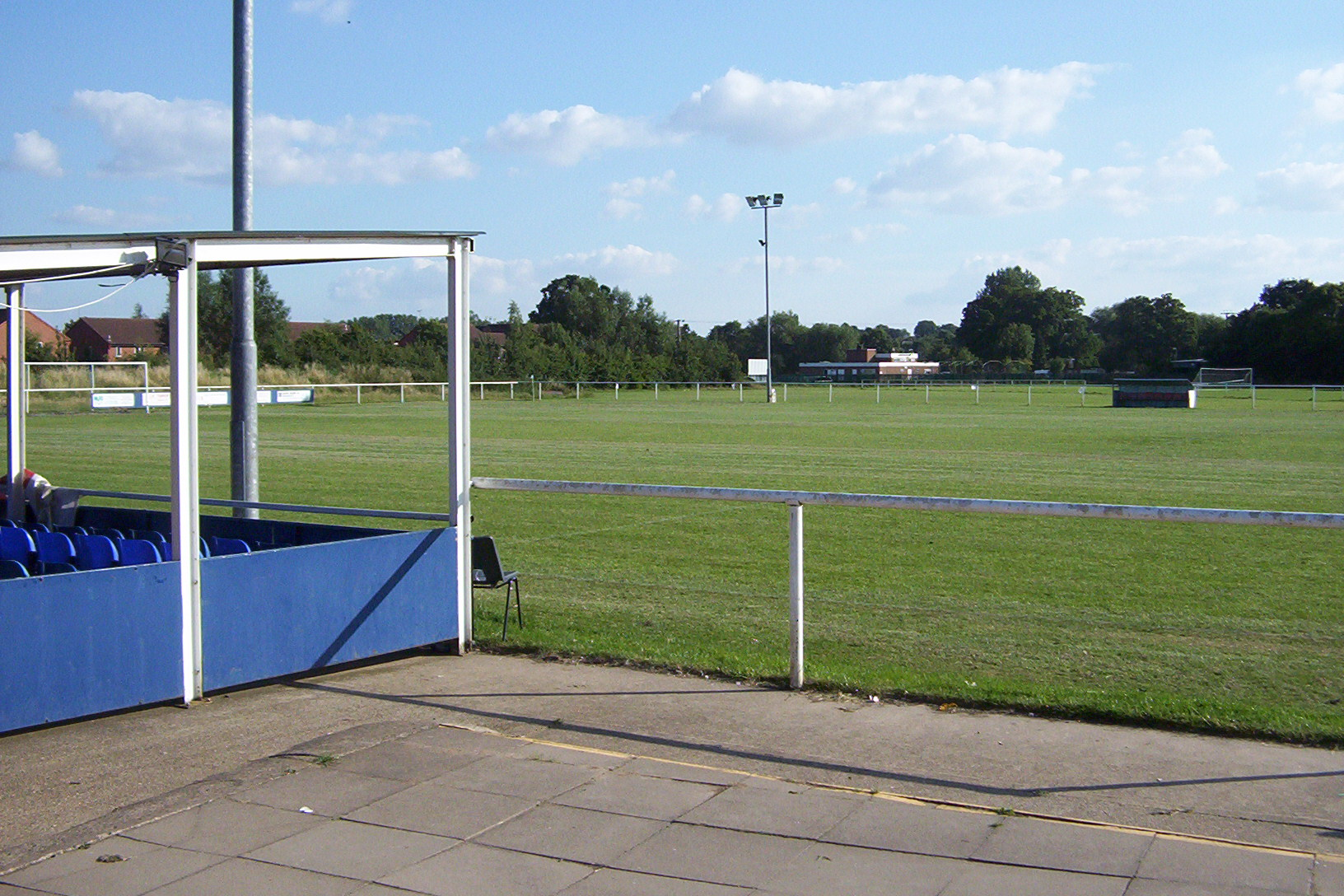
The club's home ground, The Beehive

The Beehive is situated in Abbeyfields Drive, which is off the main Birmingham – Alcester Road (A435). Recent years have seen a lot of improvements take place at The Beehive, the changing rooms have been given a complete face-lift, and for the first time ever, a snack bar is open on match days. Average attendance in home league matches at the Beehive is about 100.

In August 2020, National League club Solihull Moors started using the site as their training ground having made significant investment into the facility as part of a long-term partnership with Studley.

== Honours ==
- 1987–88 – Challenge Vase Winners
- 1990–91 – Smedley Crooke Cup Winners
- 1991–92 – Midland Combination Division One Champions
- 1991–92 – Smedley Crooke Cup Winners
- 1994–95 – Smedley Crooke Cup Winners
- 1999–2000 – Smedley Crooke Cup Winners
- 2000–01 – Worcester Senior Urn Winners
- 2000–01 – Midland Combination Premier Division Runners-Up
- 2001–02 – Tony Allden Memorial Cup Winners
- 2001–02 – Worcester Senior Urn Winners
- 2002–03 – Worcester Senior Urn Winners
- 2008–09 – Worcester Senior Urn Winners
- 2021–22 – Hellenic League Division One title
