= Highgate United F.C. =

Association football club in Solihull, England

Coordinates: 52°23′20.52″N 1°50′45.01″W

Highgate United
- Full name: Highgate United Football Club
- Nickname: The Gate
- Founded: 1948
- Ground: The Coppice, Shirley
- Chairman: Malcolm Ward
- Manager: Malcolm Ward
- League: United Counties League Premier Division South
- 2025–26: Midland League Premier Division, 17th of 18 (transferred)
Home colours	Away colours

Highgate United Football Club is a football club based in the Shirley district of Solihull, having relocated from their original home in Highgate, Birmingham. They are currently members of the United Counties League Premier Division South and play at the Coppice.

== History ==
The club was established in 1948 by a group of former residents of the St Vincent's Home for Working Boys, run by Father Hudson's Society. They initially joined the South Birmingham League before moving up to Division Two of the Worcestershire Combination in 1964. After finishing fourth in their first season in Division Two, the club were promoted to Division One.

In 1966–67 the club reached the quarter-finals of the FA Amateur Cup. During the match against Enfield, several players collapsed after a lightning strike, and Highgate's Tony Allden died the following day. The game was abandoned and replayed at Villa Park, where a crowd of over 31,000 watched Enfield win 6–0.

The 1970s was the most successful era in Highgate United's history; in 1972–73 the club were champions of the renamed Midland Combination, also winning the League Cup and reaching the semi-finals of the FA Amateur Cup, losing 4–0 in a replay to Walton & Hersham at Selhurst Park after the first match at Highfield Road had ended 0–0. They retained the league title and the League Cup the following season, also winning the Birmingham Senior Cup with a 3–2 win over Darlaston. The club won a third consecutive Midland Combination title in 1974–75 and went on to win the League Cup in 1975–76 and 1976–77.

Highgate were Division One runners-up in 1981–82 and League Cup winners in 1984–85. They finished bottom of the (renamed) Premier Division in 1994–95, but avoided being relegated as the division was expanded from 18 to 20 clubs. The club won the Coventry Evening Telegraph Cup win 2006–07, and were Premier Division runners-up the following season, earning promotion to the Midland Alliance.

In 2014 the Midland Combination and Midland League merged to form the Midland League; despite finishing third in the Alliance the previous season, Highgate were placed in Division One of the new league, a level below their previous position. However, they went on to win Division One in the Midland League's inaugural season and were promoted to the Premier Division. In 2023–24 they finished fifth in the Premier Division, qualifying for the promotion play-offs, in which they lost 3–1 to Lichfield City in the semi-finals.

== Ground ==
The club initially played at Billesley Common. By the 1960s they had relocated to their current ground on Tythe Barn Lane. In July 1996 a covered stand, partially seated and partially standing, was constructed on one side of the pitch and later named the Patrick & Philomena Meade Stand. Floodlights were installed the following year. On 25 February 2017 a was renamed the 'Tony Allden Stand'.

== Honours ==
- Midland League
  - Division One champions 2014–15
- Midland Combination
  - Division One champions 1972–73, 1973–74, 1974–75
  - League Cup winners 1972–73, 1973–74, 1975–76, 1976–77, 1984–85
- Birmingham Senior Cup
  - Winners 1973–74
- Coventry Evening Telegraph Cup
  - Winners 2006–07
- Tony Allden Memorial Cup
  - Winners 1973–74, 1974–75

== Records ==
- Best FA Cup performance: Fourth qualifying round, 1973–74
- Best FA Amateur Cup performance: Semi-finals, 1972–73
- Best FA Trophy performance: Third round, 1974–75
- Best FA Vase performance: Third round, 2023–24

== See also ==
- Highgate United F.C. players
- Highgate United F.C. managers
