= Southam United F.C. =

Association football club in England

Coordinates: 52°14′38.27″N 1°23′33.28″W

Southam United
- Full name: Southam United Football Club
- Nickname: The Saints
- Founded: 1905
- Ground: Bobby Hancocks Park, Southam
- League: Coventry Alliance League Premier Division
- 2025–26: Hellenic League Division One (resigned)
- Website: southamunited.com
Home colours

Southam United Football Club is a football club based in Southam, Warwickshire. They were members of the Coventry Alliance League Premier Division and played at Bobby Hancocks Park, until resigning in February 2025.

== History ==
Known as the “Saints”, they celebrated their centenary in 2005, having been founded in 1905 following the amalgamation of two village teams. From 1947 to 1956 the club dominated the Coventry and North Warwickshire League. They took the step up to the Midland Combination in 1980–81 and immediately won the Division Three title. When the League was reorganised in 1983–84, United were placed in the Premier Division, but after several seasons of struggle they were downgraded to Division Two when it was discovered that their pitch was now too short owing to the construction of a bowling green next to it. Finally in 1995–96 United made it back to the Premier Division after two promotions in seven years.

The 1997–98 season was the Saints' most successful as they finished as Premier Division runners up and also won the Birmingham County FA Vase with a 3–0 victory over Shirley Town, but league form since then has been disappointing, with four successive finishes in the bottom two between 2001 and 2004 seeing relegation only staved off each time by a lack of teams with acceptable facilities to be promoted.

In 2001, Saints merged with Southam Town Junior Sports Club, a progressive junior club formed in 1972, which amongst other achievements, pioneered ladies and girls football in Warwickshire.

Although finishing in 15th place in the 2009–10 seasons, Saints had finished 3rd in each of the previous two seasons and, in addition, won the Birmingham County FA Midweek Floodlit Cup in 2008–09 with a 3–1 win over Darlaston Town and won the Coventry Evening Telegraph Cup in 2010–11 with victory at the Ricoh Arena over Alvis.

The club finished bottom of Division One of the Midland Football League in 2016–17, after which the adult team ceased to exist. The team was reformed to join Division Two North of the Hellenic League for the 2019–20 season. As part of their reformation they moved to a new built ground not far from the old one. The old ground was purchased by Bloor Homes who are looking to develop properties on the site.

In 2019–20 season, they were top of the league after 17 games when the season was abandoned due to COVID-19. Following the abandoned 2020–21 season they were transferred to the Oxfordshire Senior Football League Premier Division were they finished second, gaining promotion for the 2022–23 season back to Step 6 in Division One of the Hellenic League.

== Club records ==
- Most appearances: Bob Hancocks
- Best league performance: Midland Combination Premier Division runners-up, 1997–98
- Best FA Cup performance: Second qualifying round, 2008–09
- Best FA Vase performance: Second qualifying round, 2000–01 and 2007–08

== Sources ==
- Southam United at the Football Club History Database
