= Alveston F.C. =

Alveston
- Full name: Alveston Football Club
- Founded: 1924
- Dissolved: 2017
- Ground: Bearley Sports and Social Club, Bearley
Home colours	Away colours

Alveston Football Club was a football club based in Stratford-upon-Avon, Warwickshire, England.

== History ==
The club was established in 1924 after Alveston United folded. They joined the Stratford & District League, going on to win the title in 1924–25 and 1925–26.

In 1993 the club joined the newly formed Division Three of the Midland Combination. After finishing sixth in their first season, they were promoted to Division Two. The 1994–95 season saw them finish as Division Two runners-up, earning promotion to Division One. They went on to win Division One in 1997–98 and were promoted to the Premier Division. The following season saw them win the Premier Division at the first attempt, as well as winning the league's Challenge Cup and the Smedley Crooke Cup.

Following their period of success, the club subsequently went into decline, finishing seventeenth the season after winning the title. After improving to a fifteenth-placed finish in 2000–01, they went on to finish in the bottom three for four consecutive seasons. Although they finished tenth in 2005–06, the following season saw them finish bottom of the division, at which point they were relegated to Division One.

After three seasons in Division One, they returned to the Premier Division after finishing third in 2009–10. However, an eighteenth-place finish in the Premier Division the following season, they left the league. They subsequently dropped into Division One of the Stratford Alliance, finishing as runners-up in their first season in the league and winning the Hospital Cup. The club folded at the start of the 2017–18 season.

== Ground ==
Having previously played on Alveston's village green and on Stratford's Recreation Ground, the club moved to the Home Guard Club in Tiddington in 1975. Floodlights were erected in 1999. However, they left the ground in 2010 and later played at Bearley Sports and Social Club.

== Honours ==
- Midland Combination
  - Premier Division champions 1998–99
  - Division One champions 1997–98
  - Challenge Cup winners 1998–99
  - Smedley Crooke Cup winners 1997–98, 1998–99
  - Jack Mould Trophy winners 1995–96
- Stratford Alliance
  - Hospital Cup winners 2011–12
- Stratford and District League
  - Champions 1924–25, 1925–26
