= Castle Vale F.C. =

English football club

Castle Vale
- Full name: Castle Vale Football Club
- Nickname: The Spitfires
- Founded: 1964 (as The Horseshoe)
- Dissolved: 2012
- Ground: Vale Stadium; Farnborough Road; Castle Vale; Birmingham
- 2011–12: Midland Football Combination; Premier Division, 5th (resigned)
Home colours	Away colours

Castle Vale F.C. was a football club based in the Castle Vale area of Birmingham, England. The club was previously known as King's Heath and Castle Vale King's Heath before adopting its final name in 2005. The club resigned as members of the Midland Combination Premier Division in July 2012 and folded.

== History ==
The club was founded in 1964 as the pub team of the Horseshoe pub in the King's Heath area of Birmingham. The team played in the South Birmingham League and Mercian League for a number of years. In 1977, they changed their name to Kings Heath F.C. and joined the Midland Football Combination, initially in Division Two, and were promoted in 1982–83 to the top division, which was renamed the Premier Division in the same year.

By this stage the club, although still named Kings Heath, was based at The Glen in Solihull but were forced to leave the ground when, midway through an extensive programme of ground improvements, their financial backer abruptly pulled out, leaving them unable to complete the work. The team was able to groundshare with Knowle and later Shirley Town, but the facilities at these grounds did not meet Premier Division requirements, forcing the club to step down to Division One. In the 1992–93 season, Kings Heath finished as runners-up in Division One and were able to step back up to the Premier Division, having helped Shirley Town to get their ground up to the required standard. In 1999-2000, they achieved their best ever finish when they came second in the Premier Division.

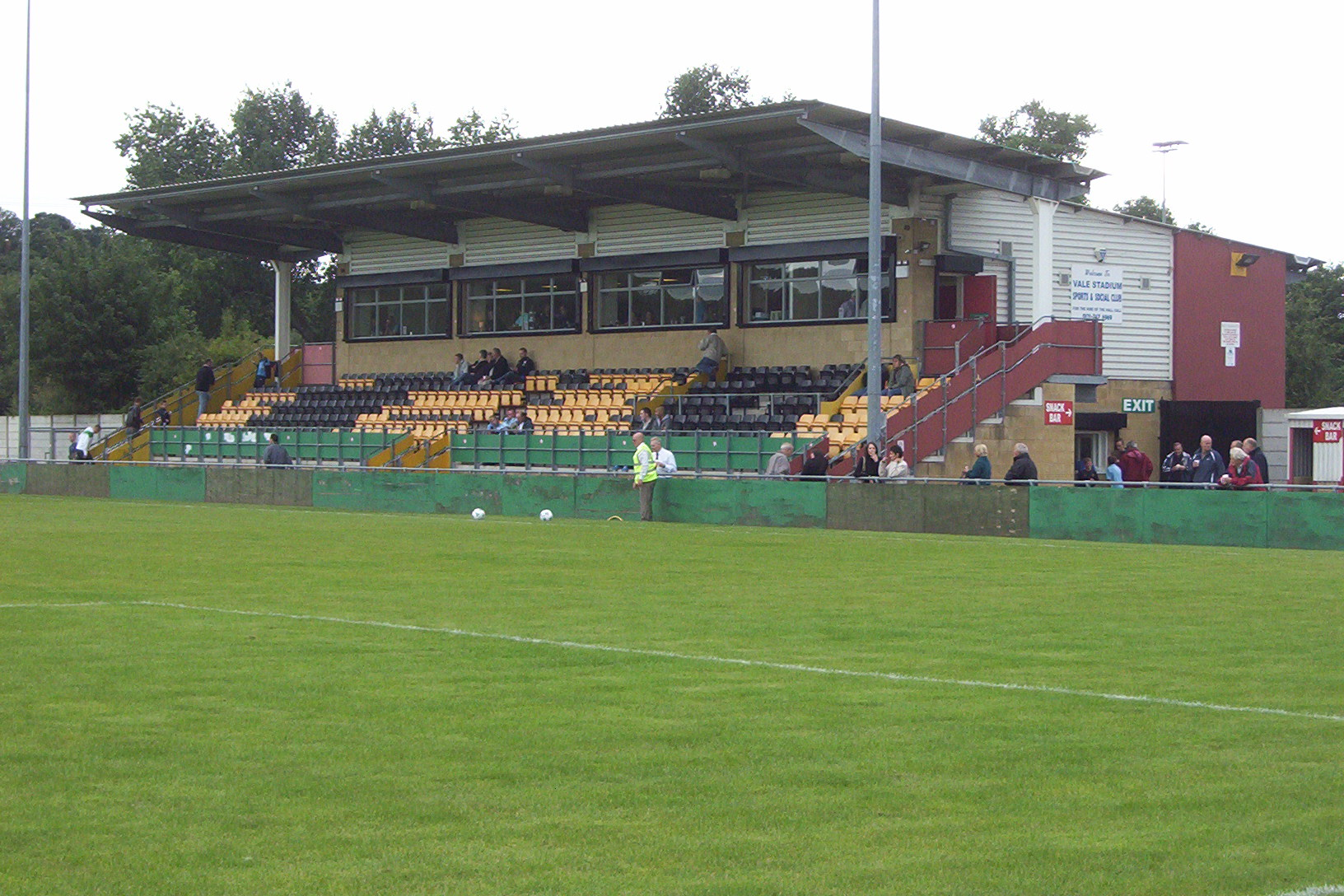
The grandstand at Vale Stadium

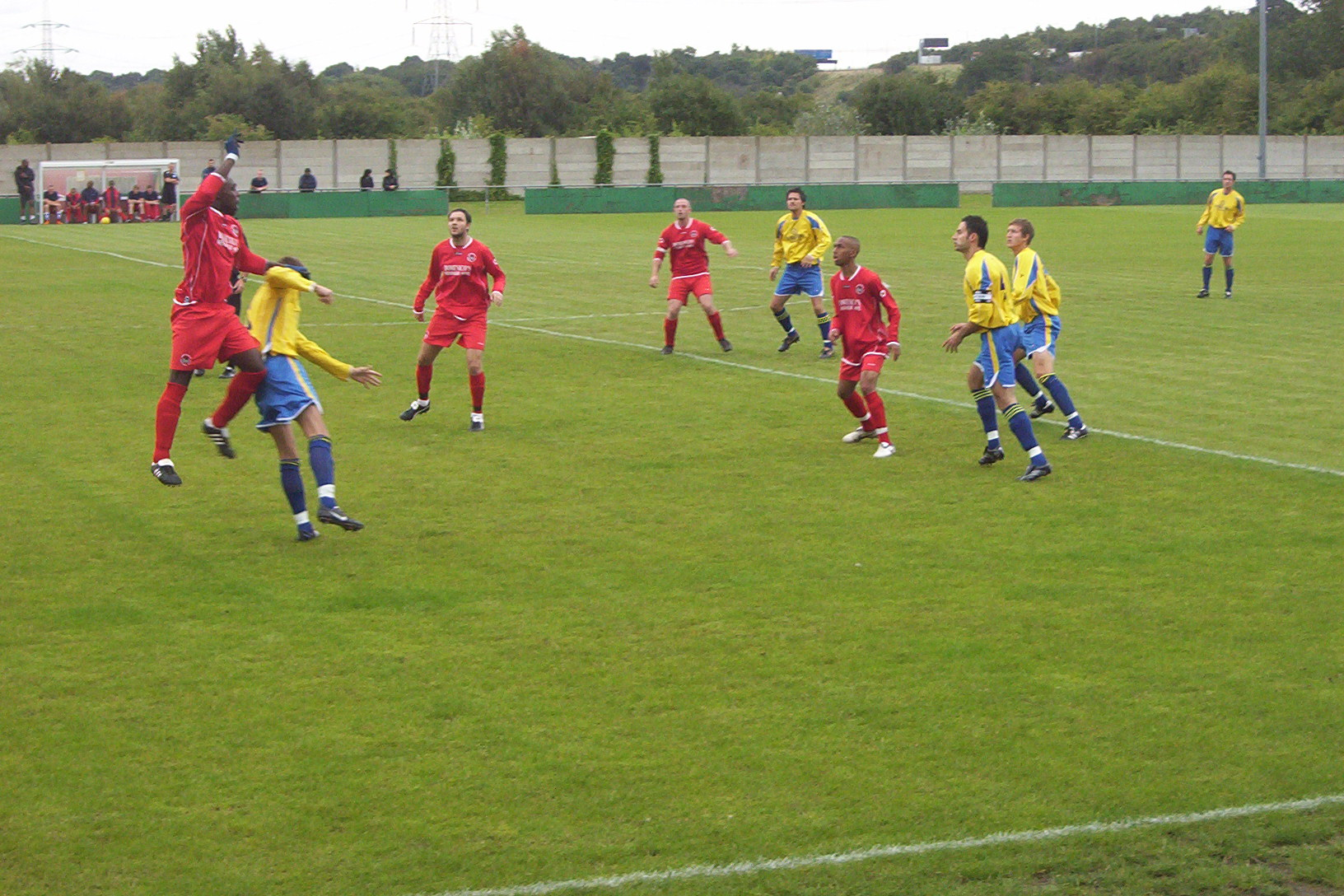
Castle Vale (red shirts) take on Barrow Town in the FA Cup in 2008

They moved on to groundshare with first Alvechurch before moving into Vale Stadium, the former home of the previously defunct Paget Rangers in Castle Vale. They accordingly changed their name to Castle Vale Kings Heath, although they were usually known as Castle Vale KH. In 2005, they dropped their last link to Kings Heath when they changed their name to simply Castle Vale F.C. The club remained in the Midland Combination Premier Division until folding in 2012. They achieved a second runners-up finish in the 2006–07 season.

== Records ==
- Best league performance: 2nd in Midland Combination Premier Division, 1999–2000, 2006–07
- Best FA Cup performance: Preliminary Round 2007–08
- Best FA Vase performance: 3rd round proper, 2006–07
