= 2017–18 Midland Football League =

The 2017–18 Midland Football League season was the 4th in the history of the Midland Football League, a football competition in England.

== Premier Division ==
Midland Football League Premier Division
- Season: 2017–18
- Champions: Bromsgrove Sporting
- Promoted: Bromsgrove Sporting
- Relegated: Haughmond; Shawbury United; Rocester
- Matches: 462
- Goals: 1,640 (3.55 per match)

The Premier Division featured 17 clubs which competed in the previous season, along with five new clubs:

- Bromsgrove Sporting, promoted from Division One
- Haughmond, promoted from the West Midlands (Regional) League
- Rugby Town, relegated from the Northern Premier League
- South Normanton Athletic, promoted from the East Midlands Counties League
- Worcester City, voluntarily demoted from the National League North

=== League table ===
Pos	Team	Pld	W	D	L	GF	GA	GD	Pts	Promotion or relegation
1	Bromsgrove Sporting	42	31	5	6	110	50	+60	98	Promoted to Southern League Division One Central
2	Coleshill Town	42	28	8	6	106	47	+59	92	Promoted to Southern League Division One Central (Note: 12 of the 14 runners-up at Step 5 were to have been promoted to Step 4. However, with resignations and mergers in leagues above, all fourteen runners-up were promoted.)
3	Highgate United	42	28	6	8	92	47	+45	90	
4	Worcester City	42	24	11	7	94	41	+53	83	
5	Sporting Khalsa	42	20	11	11	83	58	+25	71	
6	Rugby Town	42	19	7	16	76	60	+16	64	Transferred to the United Counties League Premier Division
7	Shepshed Dynamo	42	18	9	15	95	76	+19	63	
8	Coventry United	42	18	7	17	80	77	+3	61	
9	Long Eaton United	42	18	7	17	65	86	−21	61	
10	Coventry Sphinx	42	16	12	14	73	65	+8	60	
11	Quorn	42	18	6	18	77	89	−12	60	
12	Westfields	42	17	8	17	86	83	+3	59	
13	Heanor Town	42	17	7	18	67	79	−12	58	Voluntarily relegated to the East Midlands Counties League
14	Boldmere St Michaels	42	15	8	19	59	75	−16	53	
15	Stourport Swifts	42	13	10	19	65	88	−23	49	
16	Lye Town	42	13	8	21	62	79	−17	47	
17	AFC Wulfrunians	42	14	5	23	52	88	−36	47	
18	Loughborough University	42	12	7	23	57	82	−25	43	
19	South Normanton Athletic	42	12	7	23	59	91	−32	43	
20	Haughmond	42	9	11	22	58	80	−22	38	Relegated to the West Midlands (Regional) League
21	Shawbury United	42	10	7	25	59	80	−21	37	Relegated to the West Midlands (Regional) League
22	Rocester	42	5	7	30	65	119	−54	22	Relegated to Division One

Source: FA Full-Time
Rules for classification: 1) Points; 2) Goal difference; 3) Number of goals scored; 4) Number of matches won; 5) Head-to-head results

=== Stadia and locations ===
Locations of the Premier Division clubs

Club	Location	Stadium	Capacity
AFC Wulfrunians	Wolverhampton	Castlecroft Stadium	2,000
Boldmere St. Michaels	Boldmere	Trevor Brown Memorial Ground	2,500
Bromsgrove Sporting	Bromsgrove	Victoria Ground	3,500
Coleshill Town	Coleshill	Pack Meadow	2,070
Coventry Sphinx	Coventry	Sphinx Drive	1,000
Coventry United	Coventry	Butts Park Arena	3,000
Haughmond	Shrewsbury	Sundorne Sports Village	
Heanor Town	Heanor	Town Ground	2,700
Highgate United	Shirley	The Coppice	2,000
Long Eaton United	Long Eaton	Grange Park	3,000
Loughborough University	Loughborough	Loughborough University Stadium	3,300
Lye Town	Lye	The Sports Ground	1,000
Quorn	Quorn	Farley Way Stadium	1,400
Rocester	Rocester	Hillsfield	4,000
Rugby Town	Rugby	Butlin Road	6,000
Shawbury United	Wem	Butler Sports Centre	1,000
Shepshed Dynamo	Shepshed	The Dovecote Stadium	2,500
South Normanton Athletic	South Normanton	Lees Lane	3,000
Sporting Khalsa	Willenhall	Aspray Arena	2,500
Stourport Swifts	Stourport-on-Severn	Walshes Meadow	2,000
Westfields	Hereford	allpay.park	2,000
Worcester City	Bromsgrove	Victoria Ground	3,500

== Division One ==
Midland Football League Division One
- Season: 2017–18
- Champions: Walsall Wood
- Promoted: Walsall Wood; Ilkeston Town
- Relegated: Stafford Town; Bolehall Swifts; Coventry Alvis
- Matches: 462
- Goals: 1,892 (4.1 per match)

Division One featured 17 clubs which competed in the previous season, along with five new clubs.

- Two clubs relegated from the Premier Division:
  - Brocton
  - Walsall Wood
- Two clubs promoted from Division Two:
  - Coventry Alvis, with a name change from Alvis Sporting Club
  - Paget Rangers
- Plus:
  - Ilkeston Town, new club formed after Ilkeston folded

=== League table ===
Pos	Team	Pld	W	D	L	GF	GA	GD	Pts	Promotion or relegation
1	Walsall Wood	42	36	2	4	173	36	+137	110	Promoted to the Premier Division
2	Ilkeston Town	42	30	5	7	107	46	+61	95	Promoted to the Premier Division
3	Atherstone Town	42	29	5	8	128	50	+78	92	
4	Leicester Road	42	28	6	8	99	52	+47	90	
5	Racing Club Warwick	42	25	6	11	112	69	+43	81	
6	Hinckley	42	25	5	12	136	76	+60	80	
7	Heather St John's	42	25	5	12	136	81	+55	80	
8	Littleton	42	24	1	17	88	53	+35	73	
9	Studley	42	21	8	13	84	77	+7	71	
10	Lichfield City	42	17	7	18	81	89	−8	58	
11	Uttoxeter Town	42	16	8	18	87	101	−14	56	
12	Paget Rangers	42	16	7	19	80	85	−5	55	
13	Coventry Copsewood	42	16	4	22	65	91	−26	52	
14	Heath Hayes	42	11	11	20	90	99	−9	44	
15	Cadbury Athletic	42	11	11	20	66	82	−16	44	
16	Chelmsley Town	42	12	8	22	55	89	−34	44	
17	Brocton	42	11	10	21	69	87	−18	43	
18	Pershore Town	42	11	8	23	64	95	−31	41	Transferred to the West Midlands (Regional) League
19	Nuneaton Griff	42	10	8	24	52	102	−50	38	
20	Stafford Town	42	9	3	30	52	107	−55	30	Relegated to the Staffordshire County Senior League
21	Bolehall Swifts	42	7	4	31	34	143	−109	25	Relegated to Division Two
22	Coventry Alvis	42	4	4	34	34	182	−148	16	Relegated to Division Two

Source: FA Full-Time
Rules for classification: 1) Points; 2) Goal difference; 3) Number of goals scored; 4) Number of matches won; 5) Head-to-head results

=== Stadia and locations ===
Location of Division one clubs

Club	Location	Stadium	Capacity
Atherstone Town	Atherstone	Sheepy Road	3,500
Bolehall Swifts	Tamworth	Rene Road	
Brocton	Stafford	Silkmore Lane	
Cadbury Athletic	Bournville	Triplex Sports Ground	
Chelmsley Town	Chelmsley Wood	Pack Meadow	
Coventry Alvis	Coventry	Alvis Sports & Social Club	
Coventry Copsewood	Coventry	Allard Way	
Heath Hayes	Heath Hayes	Coppice Colliery Ground	
Heather St John's	Heather	St. John's Park	
Hinckley	Heather	St. John's Park	
Ilkeston Town	Ilkeston	New Manor Ground	3,029
Leicester Road	Hinckley	Leicester Road Stadium	4,329
Littleton	North and Middle Littleton	Five Acres	
Nuneaton Griff	Nuneaton	Pingles Stadium	6,000
Paget Rangers	Boldmere	Church Road	
Pershore Town	Pershore	King George V Playing Fields	
Racing Club Warwick	Warwick	Townsend Meadow	
Stafford Town	Stafford	Evans Park	
Studley	Studley	The Beehive	1,500
Uttoxeter Town	Uttoxeter	Oldfields	
Walsall Wood	Walsall Wood	Oak Park	

== Division Two ==
Midland Football League Division Two
- Season: 2017–18
- Champions: NKF Burbage
- Promoted: NKF Burbage
- Matches: 230
- Goals: 862 (3.75 per match)

Division Two featured eleven clubs which competed in the division last season, along with five new clubs:

- Pelsall Villa, relegated from Division One
- NKF Burbage, promoted from Division Three
- Montpellier, promoted from Division Three
- Northfield Town, promoted from Division Three
- Moors Academy, promoted from Division Three

=== League table ===
Pos	Team	Pld	W	D	L	GF	GA	GD	Pts	Promotion or relegation
1	NKF Burbage	29	25	3	1	71	17	+54	78	Promoted to Division One
2	Smithswood Firs	27	22	2	3	74	32	+42	68	Resigned from the league
3	Droitwich Spa	29	18	2	9	74	45	+29	56	Transferred to the West Midlands (Regional) League Division One
4	Feckenham	29	15	4	10	64	54	+10	49	
5	Hampton	30	15	4	11	57	63	−6	49	
6	Montpellier	30	12	5	13	59	69	−10	41	Resigned from the league
7	Fairfield Villa	30	11	7	12	52	57	−5	40	
8	Moors Academy	30	11	6	13	60	52	+8	39	
9	Barnt Green Spartak	30	11	6	13	48	57	−9	39	
10	Northfield Town	29	11	5	13	41	51	−10	38	
11	Knowle	29	11	4	14	59	59	0	37	
12	Coton Green	29	8	8	13	49	51	−2	32	
13	Earlswood Town	29	7	6	16	43	66	−23	27	
14	Redditch Borough	29	7	4	18	51	62	−11	25	
15	Bloxwich Town	29	7	4	18	39	70	−31	25	Resigned from the league
16	Pelsall Villa	22	1	6	15	21	57	−36	9	Resigned from the league

Source: fchd
Rules for classification: 1) points; 2) goal difference; 3) number of goals scored.

== Division Three ==
Midland Football League Division Three
- Season: 2017–18
- Champions: GNP Sports
- Promoted: GNP Sports; Boldmere Sports & Social; FC Stratford
- Matches: 240
- Goals: 1,072 (4.47 per match)

Division Three featured nine clubs which competed in the division last season, along with seven new clubs:

- Bartestree, joined from the Herefordshire County League
- Birmingham Tigers, joined from the Birmingham & District League
- CT Shush, joined from the Birmingham & District League
- Central Ajax, joined from the Stratford on Avon Alliance
- Continental Star, relegated from Division Two
- GNP Sports, joined from the Coventry Alliance
- Leamington Hibs, relegated from Division Two

=== League table ===
Pos	Team	Pld	W	D	L	GF	GA	GD	Pts	Promotion or relegation
1	GNP Sports	30	26	2	2	144	23	+121	80	Promoted to Division Two
2	Boldmere Sports & Social	30	21	1	8	76	46	+30	64	Promoted to Division Two
3	FC Stratford	30	18	5	7	98	36	+62	59	Promoted to Division Two
4	Alcester Town	30	18	5	7	84	41	+43	59	
5	Bartestree	30	18	1	11	88	53	+35	55	
6	AFC Solihull	30	14	6	10	64	56	+8	48	
7	Coventrians	30	15	3	12	67	62	+5	48	
8	Central Ajax	30	13	7	10	74	78	−4	46	
9	Inkberrow	30	13	6	11	74	50	+24	45	
10	Shipston Excelsior	30	13	4	13	63	69	−6	43	
11	Birmingham Tigers	30	10	5	15	58	84	−26	35	
12	CT Shush	30	7	9	14	42	60	−18	30	
13	Continental Star	30	9	2	19	49	94	−45	28 (Note: Continental Star one point deducted.)	
14	Enville Athletic	30	6	6	18	32	59	−27	24	
15	Castle Vale Town	30	4	3	23	33	117	−84	15	
16	Leamington Hibs	30	1	3	26	26	144	−118	6	

Source: fchd
Rules for classification: 1) points; 2) goal difference; 3) number of goals scored.
