= 2014–15 Midland Football League =

The 2014–15 Midland Football League season was the first in the history of the new Midland Football League, a football competition in England.

At the end of the previous season the Midland Football Alliance and the Midland Football Combination merged to form the Midland Football League. The Midland Alliance clubs formed Premier Division, while the Midland Combination clubs formed Division One.

== Premier Division ==
Midland Football League Premier Division
- Season: 2014–15
- Champions: Basford United
- Promoted: Basford United
- Relegated: Heath Hayes; Tipton Town
- Matches: 462
- Goals: 1,585 (3.43 per match)

The Premier Division featured 18 clubs which competed in the Midland Alliance in the previous season, along with four new clubs:

- Brocton, promoted from the Midland Combination
- Basford United, transferred from the Northern Counties East League
- Long Eaton United, transferred from the Northern Counties East League
- Lye Town, promoted from the West Midlands (Regional) League

=== League table ===
Pos	Team	Pld	W	D	L	GF	GA	GD	Pts	Promotion or relegation
1	Basford United	42	31	2	9	127	51	+76	95	Promoted to the Northern Premier League Division One South
2	Coleshill Town	42	28	5	9	114	47	+67	89	
3	Long Eaton United	42	23	11	8	78	48	+30	80	
4	Walsall Wood	42	24	7	11	63	38	+25	79	
5	Kirby Muxloe	42	23	7	12	88	60	+28	76	Transferred to the United Counties League
6	Lye Town	42	22	6	14	88	59	+29	72	
7	AFC Wulfrunians	42	21	6	15	70	57	+13	69	
8	Westfields	42	19	10	13	78	66	+12	67	
9	Boldmere St. Michaels	42	19	9	14	69	64	+5	66	
10	Stourport Swifts	42	17	11	14	60	50	+10	62	
11	Quorn	42	18	8	16	71	62	+9	62	
12	Rocester	42	17	4	21	59	93	−34	55	
13	Brocton	42	13	12	17	73	84	−11	51	
14	Causeway United	42	15	5	22	57	83	−26	50	Club folded
15	Alvechurch	42	12	12	18	52	63	−11	48	
16	Shepshed Dynamo	42	12	9	21	73	82	−9	45	
17	Continental Star	42	14	6	22	69	91	−22	45 (Note: Continental Star were deducted 3 points for playing an ineligible player.)	
18	Coventry Sphinx	42	12	10	20	76	84	−8	43 (Note: Coventry Sphinx were deducted 3 points for playing an ineligible player.)	
19	Dunkirk	42	12	6	24	52	90	−38	42	
20	Loughborough University	42	9	9	24	70	98	−28	36	
21	Tipton Town	42	9	7	26	55	103	−48	34	Relegated to the West Midlands (Regional) League
22	Heath Hayes	42	6	10	26	43	112	−69	28	Relegated to Division One

Source: MFL Premier Division table
Rules for classification: 1) points; 2) goal difference; 3) number of goals scored.

=== Results ===
Home \ Away	AWU	ALV	BAS	BOS	BRO	CAU	COL	COS	COV	DUN	HEA	KIM	LOE	LOU	LYE	QON	ROC	SPD	SPS	TIP	WAW	WES
AFC Wulfrunians		3–0	5–3	0–3	3–1	2–1	2–1	2–0	2–4	1–1	4–1	1–2	0–5	4–1	0–1	2–0	1–0	1–0	0–1	0–2	0–3	1–1
Alvechurch	1–0		2–1	4–1	4–1	3–2	0–3	1–0	0–4	4–1	1–1	1–2	0–1	1–1	0–0	0–0	4–0	0–0	0–2	2–4	1–0	1–1
Basford United	2–1	1–2		3–0	2–1	4–0	3–3	2–4	3–1	6–0	8–1	7–0	1–1	3–2	3–0	4–3	1–2	4–1	5–0	3–1	3–1	5–2
Boldmere St. Michaels	1–1	4–3	1–6		4–1	2–1	0–5	1–0	4–1	1–2	1–2	2–1	1–2	1–2	0–5	1–0	6–1	1–1	1–1	1–0	0–0	1–3
Brocton	2–2	4–4	2–0	1–0		2–1	2–8	1–1	1–4	1–0	1–1	1–2	2–5	2–2	5–0	0–0	2–1	0–2	1–1	2–1	3–1	2–2
Causeway United	1–0	2–1	0–1	3–0	4–3		0–3	1–3	1–0	1–2	2–0	2–2	0–3	1–0	0–8	1–0	2–0	1–0	0–2	2–1	1–4	6–1
Coleshill Town	3–1	2–1	1–2	3–0	2–1	3–1		2–1	8–2	3–1	6–1	1–1	1–1	2–0	0–2	2–0	2–1	4–1	0–2	3–2	2–1	2–2
Continental Star	1–3	2–2	0–2	1–3	1–0	3–1	1–0		3–0	1–0	2–2	1–5	1–4	2–1	2–1	0–1	5–2	1–4	1–1	0–3	1–2	0–2
Coventry Sphinx	0–2	1–0	0–5	0–1	2–2	5–0	2–1	3–1		0–2	2–2	2–0	3–3	4–2	2–0	1–1	1–2	2–1	0–0	10–0	1–2	2–4
Dunkirk	1–2	1–0	2–4	1–2	3–2	1–2	0–3	2–2	2–2		3–0	1–0	1–3	3–1	1–0	1–2	3–5	1–0	0–2	2–2	1–4	2–3
Heath Hayes	0–5	0–2	0–2	1–2	2–2	1–1	0–5	1–2	1–0	2–1		0–4	1–3	0–1	0–5	0–6	0–5	3–1	1–2	0–2	0–1	1–1
Kirby Muxloe	1–0	1–0	3–0	1–4	2–1	2–1	5–0	3–1	5–4	2–2	2–2		0–0	2–1	1–3	1–0	0–0	4–2	2–1	8–0	3–0	1–2
Long Eaton United	2–2	0–0	0–2	0–0	4–1	3–2	0–4	3–2	1–0	0–0	1–2	2–1		2–1	1–1	2–1	2–3	3–1	2–1	2–1	1–2	2–0
Loughborough University	3–4	3–1	1–5	1–2	2–2	4–2	2–3	5–2	1–1	2–1	3–3	1–4	2–2		3–1	1–2	2–4	2–2	1–2	2–2	0–3	6–1
Lye Town	1–3	4–0	3–2	2–3	0–3	1–1	2–1	7–0	3–2	6–2	3–1	4–1	0–1	4–1		1–0	0–0	5–4	2–2	2–1	1–1	3–1
Quorn	0–1	4–1	0–6	1–0	2–3	3–3	0–6	4–1	4–1	6–1	3–2	3–2	1–3	2–1	3–0		2–3	1–1	1–2	2–2	0–1	3–2
Rocester	0–1	2–1	3–2	1–9	2–0	2–1	0–3	1–5	1–1	1–2	1–1	1–4	2–1	2–1	0–3	1–2		2–1	2–1	2–1	2–0	0–2
Shepshed Dynamo	1–2	1–1	0–2	1–1	2–4	2–2	0–5	6–5	5–0	5–2	2–1	1–2	0–1	3–3	0–1	0–1	2–1		3–1	4–0	1–2	3–0
Stourport Swifts	2–0	1–1	0–2	1–1	1–3	0–1	1–0	2–5	1–0	2–0	6–1	0–0	1–1	3–0	2–1	1–2	5–0	1–2		3–1	1–1	1–1
Tipton Town	0–4	1–1	1–2	1–3	2–4	0–1	0–4	1–1	3–3	5–0	2–3	0–6	1–4	1–2	1–0	0–4	3–1	4–4	1–0		0–1	0–3
Walsall Wood	1–1	1–0	1–3	0–0	0–0	2–1	1–2	2–1	2–1	0–1	3–0	2–0	2–1	3–0	1–2	1–1	1–0	4–1	2–0	0–1		2–0
Westfields	3–1	0–1	0–2	1–1	2–1	4–1	2–2	2–3	2–2	1–0	3–2	3–0	1–0	4–0	4–0	0–0	7–0	1–2	2–1	2–1	0–2	

Updated to match(es) played on unknown. Source:
Legend: Blue = home team win; Yellow = draw; Red = away team win.

=== Stadia and locations ===
Map showing the location of teams in 2014–15 Midland Football League Premier Division season

Team	Location	Stadium	Capacity
AFC Wulfrunians	Wolverhampton	Castlecroft Stadium	
Alvechurch	Alvechurch	Lye Meadow	3,000
Basford United	Basford	Greenwich Avenue	1,600
Brocton	Stafford	Silkmore Lane	
Boldmere St. Michaels	Boldmere	Trevor Brown Memorial Ground	2,500
Causeway United	Halesowen	The Grove	3,150
Coleshill Town	Coleshill	Pack Meadow	
Continental Star	Rushall	Dale Lane	1,980
Coventry Sphinx	Coventry	Sphinx Drive	
Dunkirk	Nottingham	Ron Steel Sports Ground	1,500
Heath Hayes	Heath Hayes and Wimblebury	Coppice Colliery Ground	
Kirby Muxloe	Kirby Muxloe	Ratby Lane	3,000
Long Eaton United	Long Eaton	Grange Park	1,500
Loughborough University	Loughborough	Loughborough University Stadium	3,300
Lye Town	Lye	The Sports Ground	
Quorn	Quorn	Farley Way Stadium	
Rocester	Rocester	Hillsfield	4,000
Shepshed Dynamo	Shepshed	Dovecote Stadium	2,500
Stourport Swifts	Stourport-on-Severn	Walshes Meadow	2,000
Tipton Town	Tipton	Tipton Sports Academy	1,000
Walsall Wood	Walsall Wood	Oak Park	
Westfields	Hereford	allpay.park	

== Division One ==
Midland Football League Division One
- Season: 2014–15
- Champions: Highgate United
- Promoted: Highgate United
- Relegated: Alvis Sporting Club
- Matches: 380
- Goals: 1,496 (3.94 per match)

Division One featured 15 clubs which competed in the Midland Combination Premier Division last season, along with five new clubs:

- Cadbury Athletic, promoted from Midland Combination Division One
- Heather St John's, relegated from Midland Football Alliance
- Highgate United, relegated from Midland Football Alliance
- Hinckley, new club
- Uttoxeter Town, promoted from the Staffordshire County Senior League

=== League table ===
Pos	Team	Pld	W	D	L	GF	GA	GD	Pts	Promotion or relegation
1	Highgate United	38	28	5	5	113	42	+71	89	Promoted to the Premier Division
2	Bromsgrove Sporting	38	27	5	6	121	41	+80	86	
3	Hinckley	38	23	7	8	106	53	+53	76	
4	Bolehall Swifts	38	23	7	8	103	50	+53	76	
5	Uttoxeter Town	38	22	6	10	87	51	+36	72	Resigned to the Staffordshire County Senior League
6	Cadbury Athletic	38	19	8	11	80	50	+30	65	
7	Southam United	38	20	3	15	71	69	+2	63	
8	Coventry Copsewood	38	17	10	11	83	55	+28	60 (Note: Coventry Copsewood were deducted 1 point for playing an ineligible player)	
9	Littleton	38	17	4	17	77	60	+17	55	
10	Studley	38	15	7	16	68	86	−18	52	
11	Pershore Town	38	15	6	17	51	61	−10	51	
12	Lichfield City	38	14	8	16	63	67	−4	50	
13	Atherstone Town	38	14	4	20	77	92	−15	46	
14	Stafford Town	38	13	7	18	74	93	−19	46	
15	Pilkington XXX	38	13	5	20	74	75	−1	44	
16	Heather St. John's	38	12	7	19	63	85	−22	43	
17	Nuneaton Griff	38	11	8	19	66	79	−13	41	
18	Racing Club Warwick	38	10	4	24	52	102	−50	34	
19	Pelsall Villa	38	4	5	29	35	162	−127	17	
20	Alvis Sporting Club	38	4	2	32	32	123	−91	14	Relegated to Division Two

Source: MFL Division One table
Rules for classification: 1) points; 2) goal difference; 3) number of goals scored.

=== Results ===
Home \ Away	ALV	ATH	BOS	BRS	CAD	COV	HEJ	HIG	HIN	LIC	LIT	NUN	PEL	PER	PIL	RCW	SOU	STA	STU	UTT
Alvis Sporting Club		3–6	0–2	0–4	1–6	1–6	1–5	0–6	0–2	2–3	0–3	3–0	1–3	0–3	0–3	0–2	0–3	1–1	1–1	0–2
Atherstone Town	4–3		1–2	1–2	1–1	0–1	2–3	1–1	1–2	0–3	0–4	4–3	7–0	2–1	1–0	1–3	1–5	2–0	2–2	2–1
Bolehall Swifts	4–0	2–3		0–2	0–2	2–1	4–0	2–2	3–3	0–1	2–0	2–1	3–1	4–0	4–3	9–0	1–2	1–1	1–2	1–0
Bromsgrove Sporting	2–1	3–2	2–2		1–2	2–0	4–2	0–1	2–3	1–0	2–3	6–1	6–0	0–0	5–3	8–0	7–0	6–0	6–0	2–3
Cadbury Athletic	5–0	0–1	4–4	1–2		3–3	4–1	1–1	2–1	0–3	1–2	3–2	7–0	1–3	1–0	1–0	2–0	0–0	3–4	1–2
Coventry Copsewood	5–0	5–0	1–2	1–1	1–1		2–1	0–4	0–1	1–1	3–1	1–3	3–0	0–2	2–0	0–0	3–3	2–2	7–2	2–0
Heather St. John's	2–5	2–1	1–5	1–2	0–1	1–7		2–3	1–1	4–3	2–0	0–0	4–0	1–0	0–2	4–3	2–1	2–2	1–2	1–1
Highgate United	4–0	5–2	3–1	1–3	1–2	1–2	3–1		2–2	6–1	3–2	3–1	4–0	3–1	2–1	2–1	2–0	7–0	3–5	3–1
Hinckley	6–1	5–1	2–3	1–2	3–1	2–0	2–2	0–3		2–2	4–0	2–0	13–0	1–0	2–2	2–2	5–1	8–2	0–1	1–6
Lichfield City	3–0	2–1	1–1	3–3	0–1	4–1	1–2	0–1	0–2		1–2	2–4	0–0	1–3	2–2	2–0	1–0	0–2	3–3	2–3
Littleton	1–2	2–1	1–3	0–3	2–2	0–1	5–1	2–3	1–0	2–3		8–1	5–0	3–0	2–3	3–0	0–2	4–1	1–1	1–0
Nuneaton Griff	5–0	3–3	1–1	1–2	0–0	1–2	3–3	0–2	0–2	4–0	2–1		2–2	1–1	3–1	0–2	2–1	3–0	1–2	3–5
Pelsall Villa	3–0	0–6	0–10	0–7	0–3	0–4	2–4	0–4	2–3	3–3	2–2	0–3		2–4	5–1	0–2	0–2	2–6	0–3	0–9
Pershore Town	1–2	0–1	2–3	0–3	3–2	2–2	0–0	0–2	1–2	0–1	3–1	3–3	4–2		0–7	0–1	2–0	1–0	1–0	1–4
Pilkington XXX	3–1	3–2	1–3	2–3	0–2	3–3	1–0	1–2	2–5	0–3	1–1	1–2	10–1	0–1		2–1	2–4	0–0	1–2	3–2
Racing Club Warwick	6–1	5–8	1–3	1–10	1–3	0–4	1–6	0–4	2–1	0–2	1–0	2–1	0–0	1–2	2–4		1–2	1–4	2–4	0–1
Southam United	2–1	3–2	3–1	2–1	3–1	2–0	2–0	0–4	0–3	2–0	0–4	0–3	7–0	1–2	1–0	2–2		2–1	1–4	4–4
Stafford Town	2–0	8–0	0–4	1–3	2–6	5–4	3–1	4–3	3–4	2–4	3–1	4–1	3–0	1–3	2–3	2–1	4–3		1–3	1–4
Studley	1–0	1–3	0–3	1–2	0–4	1–2	4–0	1–7	2–5	2–1	2–5	4–2	3–5	1–1	1–2	2–4	0–3	0–0		1–2
Uttoxeter Town	3–1	3–1	2–5	1–1	2–0	1–1	2–0	2–2	0–3	5–1	1–2	1–0	4–0	2–0	2–1	2–1	1–2	3–1	0–0	

Updated to match(es) played on 7 May 2015. Source: MFL Division One results
Legend: Blue = home team win; Yellow = draw; Red = away team win.

== Division Two ==
Midland Football League Division Two
- Season: 2014–15
- Champions: Coventry United
- Promoted: Coventry United; Leicester Road

Division Two featured 11 clubs which competed in the Midland Combination Division One last season, along with five new clubs:

- Earlswood Town, demoted from Midland Combination Premier Division
- Leicester Road, new club
- Kenilworth Town, promoted from Midland Combination Division Two
- Coventry United, promoted from Midland Combination Division Two
- Paget Rangers, promoted from Midland Combination Division Two

=== League table ===
Pos	Team	Pld	W	D	L	GF	GA	GD	Pts	Promotion or relegation
1	Coventry United	30	22	4	4	97	40	+57	70	Promoted to Division One
2	Leicester Road	30	15	10	5	78	34	+44	55	Promoted to Division One
3	Fairfield Villa	30	17	4	9	83	61	+22	55	
4	Barnt Green Spartak	30	15	6	9	55	45	+10	51	
5	Sutton United	30	13	9	8	72	52	+20	48	
6	Chelmsley Town	30	13	7	10	60	54	+6	46	
7	Hampton	30	13	7	10	54	50	+4	46	
8	Droitwich Spa	30	15	1	14	64	66	−2	46	
9	Earlswood Town	30	12	9	9	49	57	−8	45	
10	Aston	30	12	8	10	59	47	+12	44	Resigned from the league
11	Paget Rangers	30	12	6	12	52	38	+14	42	
12	Knowle	30	9	7	14	63	57	+6	34	
13	Feckenham	30	9	5	16	53	64	−11	32	
14	FC Glades Sporting	30	8	10	12	43	62	−19	31 (Note: FC Glades Sporting 3 points deducted.)	Resigned from the league
15	Kenilworth Town	30	5	4	21	39	114	−75	16 (Note: Kenilworth Town 3 points deducted.)	Resigned from the league
16	Coton Green	30	1	1	28	24	104	−80	4	

Source: fchd
Rules for classification: 1) points; 2) goal difference; 3) number of goals scored.

== Division Three ==
Midland Football Combination Division Three
- Season: 2014–15
- Champions: Austrey Rangers
- Promoted: Austrey Rangers; Rostance Edwards

Division Three featured 12 clubs which competed in the Midland Combination Division Two last season, along with three new clubs:

- Redditch Borough
- Smithswood Firs
- Boldmere Sports & Social

=== League table ===
Pos	Team	Pld	W	D	L	GF	GA	GD	Pts	Promotion or relegation
1	Austrey Rangers	28	21	4	3	76	27	+49	67	Promoted to Division Two
2	Rostance Edwards	28	18	6	4	73	38	+35	60	Promoted to Division Two
3	Alcester Town	28	16	5	7	75	38	+37	53	
4	Redditch Borough	28	16	2	10	70	49	+21	50	
5	Smithswood Firs	28	13	7	8	75	50	+25	46	
6	Boldmere Sports & Social	28	11	9	8	60	51	+9	42	
7	Inkberrow	28	11	8	9	52	47	+5	41	
8	Enville Athletic	28	11	5	12	58	60	−2	38	
9	Badsey Rangers	28	9	7	12	55	57	−2	34	
10	Barton United	28	10	2	16	54	77	−23	32	
11	Perrywood	28	8	7	13	60	67	−7	31	
12	FC Stratford	28	8	4	16	44	72	−28	28	
13	Burntwood Town	28	8	3	17	38	78	−40	27	
14	Leamington Hibs	28	7	2	19	38	86	−48	23	
15	Northfield Town	28	5	5	18	50	81	−31	20	

Source: fchd
Rules for classification: 1) points; 2) goal difference; 3) number of goals scored.
