= 2016–17 Midland Football League =

The 2016–17 Midland Football League season was the third in the history of the Midland Football League, a football competition in England.

== Premier Division ==
Midland Football League Premier Division
- Season: 2016–17
- Champions: Alvechurch
- Promoted: Alvechurch
- Relegated: Brocton; Tividale; Walsall Wood
- Matches: 462
- Goals: 1,621 (3.51 per match)

The Premier Division featured 18 clubs which competed in the previous season, along with four new clubs:

- Coventry United, promoted from Division One
- Shawbury United, promoted from the West Midlands (Regional) League
- St Andrews, promoted from the East Midlands Counties League
- Tividale, relegated from the Northern Premier League

=== League table ===
Pos	Team	Pld	W	D	L	GF	GA	GD	Pts	Promotion or relegation
1	Alvechurch	42	28	8	6	91	33	+58	92	Promoted to the Northern Premier League Division One South
2	Coleshill Town	42	27	5	10	109	59	+50	86	
3	Sporting Khalsa	42	24	10	8	92	50	+42	82	
4	Lye Town	42	22	10	10	73	45	+28	76	
5	Westfields	42	20	10	12	98	75	+23	70	
6	Heanor Town	42	20	9	13	87	65	+22	69	
7	Highgate United	42	18	9	15	84	71	+13	63	
8	Coventry United	42	18	8	16	63	57	+6	62	
9	St Andrews	42	18	8	16	86	88	−2	62	Transferred to the United Counties League
10	Coventry Sphinx	42	16	9	17	78	79	−1	57	
11	Quorn	42	16	9	17	58	74	−16	57	
12	Boldmere St Michaels	42	15	10	17	73	63	+10	55	
13	Stourport Swifts	42	14	11	17	73	83	−10	53	
14	Long Eaton United	42	15	8	19	74	87	−13	53	
15	Shepshed Dynamo	42	14	10	18	65	68	−3	52	
16	Rocester	42	13	13	16	71	86	−15	52	
17	AFC Wulfrunians	42	14	8	20	55	72	−17	50	
18	Loughborough University	42	11	15	16	67	66	+1	48	
19	Shawbury United	42	14	5	23	69	91	−22	47	
20	Walsall Wood	42	14	5	23	57	86	−29	47	Relegated to Division One
21	Brocton	42	10	4	28	50	112	−62	34	Relegated to Division One
22	Tividale	42	6	6	30	48	111	−63	24	Relegated to the West Midlands League

Source: FA Full-Time
Rules for classification: 1) Points; 2) Goal difference; 3) Number of goals scored; 4) Number of matches won; 5) Head-to-head results

==== Promotion criteria ====
To be promoted at the end of the season a team must:

1. Have applied to be considered for promotion by the end of November
2. Pass a ground grading examination by the end of March
3. Finish the season in a position higher than that of any other team also achieving criteria 1 and 2
4. Finish the season in one of the top three positions

The following six teams achieved criterion one:

- Alvechurch
- Coleshill Town
- Coventry United
- Heanor Town
- Sporting Khalsa
- Westfields

=== Results ===
Home \ Away	AWU	ALV	BOS	BRO	COL	COV	CVU	HEA	HIG	LOE	LOU	LYE	QON	ROC	SHA	SPD	SPK	STA	SPS	TIV	WAW	WES
AFC Wulfrunians		0–2	2–0	2–3	0–0	1–4	4–1	2–0	2–2	4–3	3–2	0–1	0–2	2–2	1–0	0–1	1–3	0–4	0–3	0–0	1–0	0–1
Alvechurch	3–1		2–1	2–0	2–0	2–0	1–0	1–1	3–0	1–2	3–2	0–1	5–0	3–0	3–0	2–2	2–2	5–1	1–1	4–0	4–1	2–0
Boldmere St. Michaels	1–0	3–0		5–1	4–2	1–1	4–3	0–2	0–4	1–0	2–2	2–3	1–2	1–2	3–0	0–0	2–0	8–0	1–3	3–0	1–2	1–5
Brocton	0–5	0–3	2–1		0–4	1–0	1–1	3–2	2–6	1–4	0–2	3–1	1–2	1–1	1–3	0–4	1–6	1–3	1–3	1–0	1–1	1–2
Coleshill Town	2–1	2–0	4–1	3–2		3–4	4–0	2–3	2–1	2–3	0–2	2–3	1–0	5–2	6–1	2–0	3–3	5–1	4–3	4–2	5–2	3–1
Coventry Sphinx	3–0	0–2	0–0	8–0	1–1		1–2	1–0	1–1	4–1	2–1	1–1	2–3	4–4	3–1	2–1	0–5	0–5	1–3	1–1	4–0	2–3
Coventry United	0–1	0–1	0–2	4–1	1–3	1–0		2–1	1–3	3–1	0–0	1–2	2–0	2–0	2–0	1–0	2–2	2–4	5–0	5–1	2–0	1–1
Heanor Town	1–2	2–2	1–1	3–2	2–3	1–2	2–1		2–0	0–0	2–1	4–0	2–3	2–1	3–2	1–1	2–1	4–0	2–1	4–1	3–1	4–2
Highgate United	2–0	0–3	0–6	1–2	0–1	4–1	0–1	1–3		1–2	0–0	0–3	2–1	3–0	4–2	5–1	2–2	3–5	4–0	2–1	3–2	4–0
Long Eaton United	2–3	2–5	3–1	3–2	2–2	2–0	2–1	1–1	1–1		2–2	2–1	3–1	0–1	2–3	1–2	4–6	2–0	5–1	2–0	0–2	3–3
Loughborough University	3–2	0–2	1–1	2–4	2–4	4–1	1–3	2–4	1–0	3–1		3–3	0–1	1–1	1–1	2–1	0–1	1–3	1–0	4–2	1–1	1–1
Lye Town	2–0	1–2	1–1	3–1	0–1	5–0	0–0	1–1	1–2	4–0	1–0		3–0	0–0	4–0	3–0	0–1	1–0	2–0	2–1	2–0	2–1
Quorn	2–0	0–5	0–4	0–0	2–1	1–1	2–1	2–2	3–2	0–2	1–1	1–1		0–3	1–0	0–0	0–2	2–1	4–3	1–2	1–1	2–1
Rocester	0–0	0–3	3–0	5–4	0–4	1–4	1–0	3–2	1–2	2–1	1–1	3–1	3–2		2–2	1–2	2–2	4–4	0–0	4–1	3–2	2–4
Shawbury United	2–1	1–1	4–0	2–0	2–1	4–3	1–1	0–3	2–4	5–1	0–5	0–3	1–2	4–3		2–1	0–1	2–6	3–0	2–0	1–2	5–1
Shepshed Dynamo	5–1	0–1	3–1	3–0	1–3	2–3	2–2	3–2	1–1	2–2	1–2	2–2	3–3	2–1	2–1		1–0	1–1	1–2	3–0	1–0	4–5
Sporting Khalsa	1–0	0–1	2–2	4–0	1–1	4–2	0–1	2–1	1–1	5–0	2–1	3–0	3–2	5–3	1–0	3–2		2–0	5–1	3–0	0–2	1–1
St Andrews	1–2	1–1	2–2	1–0	2–1	1–0	0–2	4–3	0–0	5–1	4–3	1–1	2–1	0–0	4–1	2–0	0–2		3–6	1–4	5–2	0–4
Stourport Swifts	2–2	1–1	0–0	2–0	0–2	2–3	1–2	1–1	1–6	2–2	2–1	3–1	1–1	3–2	3–1	3–0	1–1	2–2		4–0	1–2	0–5
Tividale	3–1	1–4	0–3	1–3	1–5	1–3	0–2	1–4	2–2	2–4	1–1	0–2	3–2	2–2	2–1	1–2	2–3	2–4	1–5		0–2	2–2
Walsall Wood	3–5	2–1	0–2	3–1	1–2	1–3	1–1	1–3	1–4	1–0	1–1	1–3	0–3	4–0	2–5	1–0	2–1	2–1	1–0	1–3		3–4
Westfields	0–0	2–0	1–0	1–2	0–4	2–2	6–1	5–1	7–1	1–0	0–3	2–2	3–2	1–2	2–2	3–2	2–0	3–2	3–3	3–1	4–0	

Updated to match(es) played on 29 April 2017. Source: MFL Premier Division results
Legend: Blue = home team win; Yellow = draw; Red = away team win.

=== Locations ===
Locations of the Premier Division clubs

== Division One ==
Midland Football League Division One
- Season: 2016–17
- Champions: Bromsgrove Sporting
- Promoted: Bromsgrove Sporting
- Relegated: Pelsall Villa; Southam United
- Matches: 380
- Goals: 1,521 (4 per match)

Division One featured 18 clubs which competed in the previous season, along with two new clubs:

- Chelmsley Town, promoted from Division Two
- Uttoxeter Town, joined from the Staffordshire County Senior League

=== League table ===
Pos	Team	Pld	W	D	L	GF	GA	GD	Pts	Promotion or relegation
1	Bromsgrove Sporting	38	33	5	0	132	23	+109	104	Promoted to the Premier Division
2	Hinckley	38	27	4	7	133	47	+86	85	
3	Leicester Road	38	25	4	9	117	36	+81	79	
4	Atherstone Town	38	24	5	9	99	58	+41	77	
5	Cadbury Athletic	38	19	13	6	78	45	+33	70	
6	Racing Club Warwick	38	19	9	10	92	72	+20	66	
7	Lichfield City	38	17	7	14	66	61	+5	58	
8	Heather St John's	38	17	4	17	67	69	−2	55	
9	Littleton	38	16	4	18	64	64	0	52	
10	Nuneaton Griff	38	15	6	17	71	76	−5	51	
11	Uttoxeter Town	38	14	7	17	68	82	−14	49	
12	Coventry Copsewood	38	14	5	19	74	90	−16	47	
13	Bolehall Swifts	38	15	1	22	80	97	−17	46	
14	Heath Hayes	38	12	8	18	67	69	−2	44	
15	Studley	38	12	5	21	69	97	−28	41	
16	Stafford Town	38	10	9	19	69	79	−10	39	
17	Chelmsley Town	38	10	8	20	62	81	−19	38	
18	Pershore Town	38	10	8	20	48	81	−33	38	
19	Pelsall Villa	38	9	7	22	53	99	−46	34	Relegated to Division Two
20	Southam United	38	0	5	33	12	195	−183	5	Resigned from the league

Source: FA Full-Time
Rules for classification: 1) Points; 2) Goal difference; 3) Number of goals scored; 4) Number of matches won; 5) Head-to-head results

=== Results ===
Home \ Away	ATH	BOS	BRS	CAD	CHL	COV	HEA	HEJ	HIN	LRD	LIC	LIT	NUN	PEL	PER	RCW	SOU	STA	STU	UTT
Atherstone Town		1–0	0–4	1–3	4–1	5–0	2–1	0–1	3–0	1–1	1–1	0–5	5–0	4–1	1–0	3–1	3–2	4–1	1–2	0–3
Bolehall Swifts	1–2		0–8	4–3	4–2	1–2	4–0	5–2	3–7	0–8	1–2	1–2	2–4	0–4	3–1	1–2	7–0	4–2	1–2	6–2
Bromsgrove Sporting	2–2	3–0		3–2	3–2	5–2	2–1	5–0	3–0	1–0	5–0	2–0	4–2	10–0	5–0	1–1	3–0	1–1	2–0	2–1
Cadbury Athletic	1–1	3–0	1–1		2–2	2–0	2–0	2–2	0–3	0–2	2–1	3–2	1–1	1–1	3–0	2–0	6–0	3–0	2–2	4–0
Chelmsley Town	0–5	2–3	1–4	0–2		4–2	1–6	1–2	3–6	0–2	3–3	1–0	1–2	1–0	4–1	3–1	8–0	0–0	6–1	0–1
Coventry Copsewood	2–1	1–3	1–3	1–4	3–1		2–3	1–3	2–2	0–3	3–0	2–1	1–2	3–3	1–0	1–3	8–0	3–2	0–4	1–5
Heath Hayes	3–4	1–2	0–4	0–2	0–2	2–1		2–1	0–2	0–2	0–3	1–1	2–3	5–0	0–0	3–4	4–0	0–2	3–0	3–3
Heather St. John's	0–2	1–0	0–3	1–1	4–0	4–1	0–1		1–3	0–1	1–0	1–0	1–0	3–0	1–1	2–4	10–0	1–2	4–3	4–3
Hinckley	2–3	4–1	1–2	5–3	1–2	2–0	1–2	2–0		2–0	2–0	2–2	4–0	6–0	4–1	4–1	12–0	2–1	5–1	6–2
Leicester Road	2–2	4–0	0–1	0–1	4–1	4–2	1–1	5–1	2–1		4–1	7–2	3–1	5–1	1–2	1–1	11–0	3–1	3–1	5–0
Lichfield City	5–0	3–1	0–1	0–2	0–1	2–4	2–1	3–0	0–4	1–0		3–0	3–1	1–3	3–0	2–2	5–0	1–1	0–3	1–1
Littleton	1–2	3–2	0–4	0–2	2–2	1–3	0–1	4–2	2–1	1–3	2–1		1–3	2–1	1–0	2–1	2–0	1–0	3–1	1–2
Nuneaton Griff	3–5	0–3	0–5	3–0	2–1	2–4	0–0	0–2	1–1	1–3	0–1	0–0		2–1	3–4	3–7	7–0	1–0	6–0	2–0
Pelsall Villa	1–6	4–1	1–5	1–2	0–0	2–3	2–3	2–1	1–6	2–1	0–0	1–5	4–0		1–4	2–2	4–0	3–1	2–4	0–0
Pershore Town	2–0	0–6	0–3	0–3	2–2	0–3	2–2	2–2	1–2	3–2	1–4	0–6	0–3	0–1		0–2	2–0	1–1	4–0	0–0
Racing Club Warwick	2–5	1–1	0–3	2–2	3–1	2–2	1–3	2–0	1–7	1–0	3–5	3–1	1–1	2–0	3–3		15–0	3–1	2–0	3–1
Southam United	0–8	0–3	0–6	0–0	1–1	1–1	0–6	1–2	0–10	0–7	2–2	0–4	0–4	2–2	0–4	1–2		0–3	1–6	1–2
Stafford Town	2–4	6–1	0–4	3–3	1–1	2–0	4–4	4–2	1–2	2–6	4–1	0–1	2–2	1–0	2–4	3–4	7–0		2–5	0–2
Studley	1–5	1–4	2–7	1–1	0–1	2–4	2–2	2–3	1–1	0–6	1–2	4–3	3–2	4–0	1–2	1–2	4–0	1–1		1–3
Uttoxeter Town	1–3	4–1	2–2	2–2	2–0	4–4	3–1	1–2	1–6	1–5	1–2	2–1	1–4	3–2	2–1	1–2	4–0	1–3	1–2	

Source: MFL Division One results
Legend: Blue = home team win; Yellow = draw; Red = away team win.

=== Locations ===
Locations of the Division One clubs

== Division Two ==
Midland Football League Division Two
- Season: 2016–17
- Champions: Paget Rangers
- Promoted: Paget Rangers; Alvis Sporting Club
- Relegated: Leamington Hibernian; Continental Star

Division Two featured 12 clubs which competed in the division last season, along with 4 new clubs:

- Continental Star, demoted from Premier Division
- Leamington Hibernian, promoted from Division Three
- Redditch Borough, promoted from Division Three
- Smithswood Firs, promoted from Division Three

=== League table ===
Pos	Team	Pld	W	D	L	GF	GA	GD	Pts	Promotion or relegation
1	Paget Rangers	30	20	4	6	93	40	+53	64	Promoted to Division One
2	Alvis Sporting Club	30	19	6	5	59	29	+30	63	Promoted to Division One
3	Droitwich Spa	30	20	5	5	80	31	+49	62 (Note: Droitwich Spa were deducted three points for fielding an ineligible player)	
4	Redditch Borough	30	20	4	6	87	30	+57	61 (Note: Redditch Borough were deducted three points for fielding an ineligible player against Paget Rangers on 13 August 2016.)	
5	Fairfield Villa	30	17	4	9	75	51	+24	55	
6	Knowle	30	13	8	9	60	41	+19	47	
7	Coton Green	30	13	8	9	56	44	+12	47	
8	Sutton United	30	12	5	13	62	72	−10	40 (Note: Sutton United were deducted one point for fielding an ineligible player against Coton Green on 29 August 2016.)	Resigned from the league
9	Earlswood Town	30	11	5	14	49	53	−4	38	
10	Feckenham	30	9	8	13	45	64	−19	35	
11	Smithswood Firs	30	8	9	13	63	70	−7	33	
12	Barnt Green Spartak	30	9	3	18	45	80	−35	30	
13	Bloxwich Town	30	8	6	16	32	67	−35	30	
14	Hampton	30	6	5	19	33	77	−44	23	
15	Leamington Hibernian	30	6	4	20	38	79	−41	22	Relegated to Division Three
16	Continental Star	30	3	8	19	32	81	−49	17	Relegated to Division Three

Source: FA Full-Time
Rules for classification: 1) Points; 2) Goal difference; 3) Number of goals scored

== Division Three ==
Midland Football Combination Division Three
- Season: 2016–17
- Champions: NKF Burbage
- Promoted: NKF Burbage; Montpellier; Northfield Town; Moors Academy

Division Three featured 10 clubs which competed in the division last season, along with 4 new clubs:

- Castle Vale Town
- Montpellier
- Moors Academy
- NKF Burbage, from Leicestershire Senior League

=== League table ===
Pos	Team	Pld	W	D	L	GF	GA	GD	Pts	Promotion
1	NKF Burbage	26	22	4	0	76	14	+62	70	Promoted to Division Two
2	Montpellier	26	19	4	3	88	34	+54	61	Promoted to Division Two
3	Northfield Town	26	17	3	6	69	36	+33	54	Promoted to Division Two
4	Moors Academy	25	17	3	5	68	38	+30	54	Promoted to Division Two
5	Shipston Excelsior	26	12	5	9	52	53	−1	41	
6	FC Stratford	26	11	3	12	64	47	+17	36	
7	Alcester Town	26	10	5	11	34	32	+2	35	
8	Inkberrow	26	9	5	12	45	57	−12	32	
9	Coventrians	26	9	3	14	50	72	−22	30	
10	Barton United	25	7	7	11	43	41	+2	28	Resigned from the league
11	Enville Athletic	26	8	2	16	23	50	−27	26	
12	AFC Solihull	26	5	3	18	30	73	−43	18	
13	Boldmere Sports & Social Falcons	26	4	5	17	23	63	−40	17	
14	Castle Vale Town	26	3	4	19	34	89	−55	13	

Source: FA Full-Time
Rules for classification: 1) Points; 2) Goal difference; 3) Number of goals scored
