= 2015–16 Midland Football League =

The 2015–16 Midland Football League season was the 2nd in the history of the Midland Football League, a football competition in England.

== Premier Division ==
Midland Football League Premier Division
- Season: 2015–16
- Champions: Hereford
- Promoted: Hereford
- Relegated: Dunkirk
- Matches: 462
- Goals: 1,677 (3.63 per match)

The Premier Division featured 17 clubs which competed in the previous season, along with five new clubs:

- Bardon Hill, promoted from the East Midlands Counties League
- Heanor Town, transferred from the Northern Counties East League
- Hereford, new club
- Highgate United, promoted from Division One
- Sporting Khalsa, promoted from the West Midlands (Regional) League

Four clubs have applied for promotion to Step 4: Alvechurch, Heanor Town, Hereford and Sporting Khalsa.

=== League table ===
Pos	Team	Pld	W	D	L	GF	GA	GD	Pts	Promotion or relegation
1	Hereford	42	35	3	4	138	33	+105	108	Promoted to the Southern Football League
2	Alvechurch	42	32	5	5	99	30	+69	101	
3	Sporting Khalsa	42	25	8	9	90	49	+41	83	
4	Shepshed Dynamo	42	24	5	13	86	58	+28	77	
5	Coleshill Town	42	23	5	14	108	73	+35	74	
6	Heanor Town	42	22	7	13	99	77	+22	73	
7	Walsall Wood	42	21	7	14	76	66	+10	70	
8	Lye Town	42	22	3	17	86	58	+28	69	
9	Highgate United	42	19	10	13	75	60	+15	64 (Note: Highgate United were deducted 3 points for failing to fulfil their fixture against Stourport Swifts on 7 April.)	
10	Stourport Swifts	42	17	8	17	57	57	0	59	
11	Boldmere St. Michaels	42	18	5	19	70	81	−11	59	
12	Rocester	42	17	7	18	67	82	−15	58	
13	AFC Wulfrunians	42	16	9	17	70	74	−4	57	
14	Loughborough University	42	16	6	20	79	83	−4	54	
15	Brocton	42	15	8	19	75	88	−13	53	
16	Westfields	42	13	12	17	69	68	+1	51	
17	Quorn	42	12	9	21	71	78	−7	45	
18	Long Eaton United	42	12	9	21	63	85	−22	45	
19	Coventry Sphinx	42	12	3	27	68	98	−30	39	
20	Dunkirk	42	8	6	28	49	121	−72	30	Relegated to the East Midlands Counties League
21	Bardon Hill	42	7	9	26	56	120	−64	27 (Note: Bardon Hill were deducted 3 points for failing to fulfil their fixture against Alvechurch on 23 April.)	Resigned to the Leicestershire Senior League
22	Continental Star	42	2	4	36	26	138	−112	10	Demoted to Division Two

Source: Full-time FA
Rules for classification: 1) points; 2) goal difference; 3) number of goals scored.

=== Results ===
Home \ Away	AWU	ALV	BAH	BOS	BRO	COL	COS	COV	DUN	HEA	HER	HIG	LOE	LOU	LYE	QON	ROC	SPD	SPK	SPS	WAW	WES
AFC Wulfrunians		0–4	2–2	3–2	2–1	1–4	2–1	3–1	3–0	1–1	1–2	0–3	4–1	3–1	0–1	4–4	1–1	1–0	2–2	1–2	2–3	3–2
Alvechurch	0–3		2–1	2–2	2–0	3–0	8–0	3–1	4–0	1–0	1–2	3–1	3–1	4–1	2–1	1–1	4–1	4–1	1–0	1–0	2–1	3–0
Bardon Hill	3–3	0–3		0–2	1–3	2–2	3–1	1–5	2–2	3–5	0–2	1–4	1–1	0–7	1–0	2–1	0–1	0–3	0–2	0–3	2–4	0–4
Boldmere St. Michaels	1–0	1–0	3–2		2–3	1–6	5–0	2–1	3–2	1–2	0–3	0–2	2–1	0–2	2–1	2–1	1–3	1–2	0–0	3–0	2–2	2–1
Brocton	1–4	0–2	1–2	3–1		0–3	2–1	4–2	2–4	5–5	0–4	3–1	1–2	3–4	0–5	2–2	3–0	1–2	1–4	3–2	1–1	1–1
Coleshill Town	2–1	2–0	3–2	1–1	0–2		0–1	6–3	10–1	1–4	1–4	0–3	6–0	5–1	0–3	3–1	4–1	1–3	1–1	4–2	1–0	1–1
Continental Star	1–4	1–2	1–0	1–5	0–2	1–4		1–1	1–4	0–3	1–5	0–1	0–2	0–0	0–4	0–0	0–2	1–3	2–4	1–2	1–2	0–7
Coventry Sphinx	2–3	0–3	2–3	3–0	0–3	2–3	5–2		2–1	2–4	0–4	0–2	5–0	1–2	0–2	2–0	6–0	0–6	0–3	1–0	3–2	3–0
Dunkirk	0–1	1–4	3–3	0–1	2–1	0–7	3–0	1–0		0–10	2–3	1–6	1–1	0–2	1–3	0–4	3–3	0–4	3–1	0–0	2–3	0–1
Heanor Town	0–0	0–4	1–0	7–2	2–2	1–0	7–0	4–1	3–0		2–7	3–1	2–0	3–1	0–3	0–4	2–0	2–3	1–2	2–0	2–2	1–3
Hereford	1–1	1–1	7–0	2–1	4–1	4–5	6–0	6–1	4–1	8–0		0–2	1–0	1–0	4–1	2–0	4–0	2–1	4–0	6–0	2–1	3–0
Highgate United	1–0	0–2	3–3	0–1	2–3	1–2	2–0	2–2	2–1	1–2	2–1		4–3	1–0	3–2	4–0	1–2	1–1	1–1	1–1	2–1	0–2
Long Eaton United	5–1	0–2	1–4	3–3	2–4	4–3	6–1	2–0	2–0	1–2	0–4	1–1		2–1	0–0	2–2	1–3	0–4	0–2	3–0	1–2	1–1
Loughborough University	5–1	2–1	7–2	4–1	1–2	3–1	6–1	3–2	4–3	2–2	0–5	3–3	0–4		4–1	1–3	1–2	3–2	1–1	1–1	1–2	0–2
Lye Town	1–0	1–2	5–1	1–2	3–0	3–1	5–1	2–0	2–2	2–1	1–2	7–3	1–1	6–1		1–0	0–1	1–2	1–0	0–4	2–3	1–2
Quorn	1–0	0–0	6–1	1–3	5–2	0–3	2–2	3–4	4–0	1–2	0–2	0–3	3–1	3–2	1–2		2–4	1–4	2–3	1–1	1–2	2–1
Rocester	0–1	0–3	0–2	1–3	2–2	1–3	2–1	1–0	4–1	2–1	3–4	1–1	1–2	2–0	1–2	3–2		1–0	4–2	0–2	5–0	4–4
Shepshed Dynamo	4–2	0–3	3–2	3–2	1–4	2–2	3–1	0–0	0–1	3–2	1–3	0–0	2–0	1–0	4–1	2–0	2–1		1–3	2–0	0–3	2–2
Sporting Khalsa	2–3	2–3	6–1	2–1	2–2	5–2	3–0	4–1	4–0	1–3	0–3	5–2	2–1	2–0	1–0	1–1	4–0	2–1		2–0	3–0	2–0
Stourport Swifts	3–1	2–2	4–1	3–0	1–0	0–1	3–0	1–2	1–0	1–2	2–0	1–0	3–1	0–2	2–3	0–3	2–2	1–2	0–0		1–1	4–2
Walsall Wood	1–0	0–1	1–1	3–2	2–1	3–2	5–0	2–1	5–1	3–0	0–6	0–1	2–3	0–0	2–1	3–1	1–1	3–2	0–3	0–1		4–0
Westfields	2–2	0–3	1–1	4–1	0–0	1–2	3–0	4–1	1–2	3–3	0–0	1–1	1–1	4–0	1–4	1–2	4–1	0–4	0–1	0–1	2–1	

Source: MFL Premier Division results
Legend: Blue = home team win; Yellow = draw; Red = away team win.

=== Locations ===
Locations of the Premier Division clubs

== Division One ==
Midland Football League Division One
- Season: 2015–16
- Champions: Coventry United
- Promoted: Coventry United
- Matches: 380
- Goals: 1,444 (3.8 per match)

Division One featured 17 clubs which competed in the previous season, along with three new clubs:

- Coventry United, promoted from Division Two
- Heath Hayes, relegated from the Premier Division
- Leicester Road, promoted from Division Two

=== League table ===
Pos	Team	Pld	W	D	L	GF	GA	GD	Pts	Promotion or relegation
1	Coventry United	38	33	1	4	123	33	+90	100	Promoted to the Premier Division
2	Bromsgrove Sporting	38	29	4	5	102	41	+61	91	
3	Nuneaton Griff	38	27	5	6	119	41	+78	86	
4	Leicester Road	38	23	8	7	98	41	+57	77	
5	Hinckley	38	23	6	9	116	53	+63	75	
6	Pilkington XXX	38	20	7	11	73	57	+16	67	Club folded
7	Lichfield City	38	19	7	12	87	60	+27	64	
8	Heath Hayes	38	20	4	14	57	43	+14	64	
9	Littleton	38	19	4	15	61	58	+3	61	
10	Racing Club Warwick	38	16	7	15	71	76	−5	55	
11	Coventry Copsewood	38	15	9	14	75	78	−3	54	
12	Studley	38	13	7	18	67	89	−22	46	
13	Atherstone Town	38	11	8	19	55	71	−16	41	
14	Pershore Town	38	11	5	22	51	69	−18	38	
15	Cadbury Athletic	38	10	4	24	48	69	−21	34	
16	Heather St. John's	38	10	3	25	56	115	−59	33	
17	Bolehall Swifts	38	9	3	26	65	103	−38	30	
18	Stafford Town	38	8	3	27	46	96	−50	27	
19	Pelsall Villa	38	7	6	25	46	122	−76	27	
20	Southam United	38	4	5	29	28	129	−101	17	

Source: Full-time FA
Rules for classification: 1) points; 2) goal difference; 3) number of goals scored.

=== Results ===
Home \ Away	ATH	BOS	BRS	CAD	COV	CVU	HEA	HEJ	HIN	LRD	LIC	LIT	NUN	PEL	PER	PIL	RCW	SOU	STA	STU
Atherstone Town		0–3	1–2	1–0	2–2	2–4	1–1	2–1	0–2	3–2	1–2	0–1	0–3	3–0	3–0	0–0	2–2	2–1	4–1	1–3
Bolehall Swifts	2–2		2–6	0–5	2–3	1–5	1–3	3–1	0–5	1–4	4–0	0–2	3–7	4–2	0–4	1–8	3–3	11–0	1–0	0–3
Bromsgrove Sporting	3–1	4–1		4–0	5–2	4–2	2–0	7–2	2–1	3–0	2–0	3–1	0–1	3–1	3–0	3–0	1–0	1–1	3–0	3–1
Cadbury Athletic	2–1	2–2	2–0		1–1	2–1	0–3	0–2	0–1	1–2	1–3	0–2	2–3	1–3	1–1	1–3	4–2	4–0	2–3	0–2
Coventry Copsewood	0–2	0–3	1–4	2–1		0–5	2–1	4–0	1–1	1–1	0–0	0–2	2–2	4–2	0–2	0–1	2–2	7–1	3–2	4–2
Coventry United	6–1	2–0	3–2	2–1	10–0		2–0	6–2	2–2	0–3	2–1	3–0	3–2	11–0	1–0	3–0	3–1	3–1	2–1	1–0
Heath Hayes	2–1	3–1	1–2	0–1	2–0	2–1		1–2	2–1	0–0	0–2	0–1	2–1	0–0	1–0	0–1	0–1	3–0	1–0	2–0
Heather St. John's	3–1	3–1	0–4	1–0	1–5	1–4	0–4		2–3	0–2	3–4	2–2	0–3	3–2	1–0	0–5	2–5	5–0	1–0	0–2
Hinckley	2–2	3–2	1–3	2–0	1–4	0–4	3–4	4–1		3–2	2–0	1–1	1–1	3–3	3–1	4–1	0–1	4–0	9–0	8–2
Leicester Road	3–0	3–0	5–1	3–0	1–1	1–2	1–0	5–1	1–2		2–0	4–2	4–0	2–2	5–0	2–2	7–3	5–0	1–1	5–0
Lichfield City	2–2	4–1	0–2	3–0	4–1	1–2	2–4	5–1	0–4	3–2		2–2	0–3	1–1	1–1	5–1	3–2	3–1	3–1	5–1
Littleton	2–1	0–3	0–3	3–2	3–0	0–2	4–2	2–1	1–5	0–1	3–4		1–4	3–0	4–1	0–1	1–0	2–0	2–1	1–4
Nuneaton Griff	1–1	1–0	4–0	2–0	4–0	0–1	2–0	10–0	3–0	2–2	2–1	4–3		3–1	4–1	4–1	4–3	7–0	2–0	3–0
Pelsall Villa	2–1	2–1	2–2	2–6	2–1	0–3	3–4	4–2	0–2	1–2	0–8	0–0	0–7		1–7	2–4	0–5	1–3	1–0	1–5
Pershore Town	0–2	4–1	0–1	2–2	0–1	1–5	0–1	3–1	1–4	1–3	0–1	0–1	3–2	3–0		1–2	1–4	2–0	2–1	2–0
Pilkington XXX	2–3	1–0	0–5	2–0	1–3	0–2	0–1	2–2	3–2	1–1	2–2	1–0	2–1	5–1	3–1		0–1	5–0	3–1	3–2
Racing Club Warwick	2–3	3–2	1–1	1–0	1–1	1–3	1–1	3–2	1–3	2–1	2–1	2–0	1–9	4–2	3–2	0–0		0–1	3–1	0–1
Southam United	2–0	0–4	1–3	1–3	1–5	0–4	1–4	3–2	0–13	0–6	0–2	0–3	0–1	0–1	1–1	2–3	0–1		2–2	4–4
Stafford Town	2–1	2–0	0–2	3–0	0–5	0–5	0–1	3–4	2–3	2–3	0–7	1–4	0–4	3–1	0–1	1–1	6–4	1–0		1–3
Studley	3–2	3–1	3–3	0–1	3–7	0–3	3–1	1–1	0–8	0–1	2–2	0–2	3–3	3–0	2–2	0–3	3–0	1–1	2–4	

Updated to match(es) played on 13 December 2016. Source: MFL Division One results
Legend: Blue = home team win; Yellow = draw; Red = away team win.

=== Locations ===
Locations of the Division One clubs

== Division Two ==
Midland Football League Division Two
- Season: 2015–16
- Champions: Alvis Sporting Club
- Promoted: Chelmsley Town

Division Two featured 11 clubs which competed in the division last season, along with 3 new clubs:

- Alvis Sporting Club, relegated from Division One
- Austrey Rangers, promoted from Division Three
- Rostance Edwards, promoted from Division Three

=== League table ===
Pos	Team	Pld	W	D	L	GF	GA	GD	Pts	Promotion or relegation
1	Alvis Sporting Club	26	23	3	0	93	21	+72	72	
2	Chelmsley Town	26	20	3	3	71	27	+44	63	Promoted to Division One
3	Droitwich Spa	26	16	5	5	65	23	+42	53	
4	Paget Rangers	26	16	4	6	64	33	+31	52	
5	Rostance Edwards	26	15	2	9	44	34	+10	47	
6	Sutton United	26	11	1	14	50	54	−4	34	
7	Coton Green	26	7	7	12	33	54	−21	28	
8	Hampton	26	8	4	14	37	63	−26	28	
9	Knowle	26	6	9	11	36	49	−13	27	
10	Barnt Green Spartak	26	7	4	15	35	49	−14	25	
11	Austrey Rangers	26	5	9	12	36	53	−17	24	Resigned from the league
12	Feckenham	26	6	6	14	47	74	−27	24	
13	Fairfield Villa	26	6	5	15	40	64	−24	23	
14	Earlswood Town	26	3	4	19	19	72	−53	13	

Source: fchd
Rules for classification: 1) points; 2) goal difference; 3) number of goals scored.

== Division Three ==
Midland Football Combination Division Three
- Season: 2015–16
- Champions: Leamington Hibs
- Promoted: Leamington Hibs; Redditch Borough; Smithswood Firs

Division Three featured 13 clubs which competed in the division last season, along with 3 new clubs:

- AFC Solihull, from Stratford Alliance
- Coventrians
- Shipston Excelsior, from Stratford Alliance

=== League table ===
Pos	Team	Pld	W	D	L	GF	GA	GD	Pts	Promotion or relegation
1	Leamington Hibs	28	21	3	4	88	38	+50	66	Promoted to Division Two
2	Redditch Borough	28	20	2	6	90	34	+56	62	Promoted to Division Two
3	Smithswood Firs	28	21	2	5	95	44	+51	53 (Note: Smithswood Firs 12 points deducted.)	Promoted to Division Two
4	FC Stratford	28	15	4	9	73	44	+29	49	
5	Alcester Town	28	16	0	12	74	53	+21	48	
6	Barton United	28	14	6	8	56	43	+13	48	
7	Shipston Excelsior	28	15	1	12	59	57	+2	46	
8	Northfield Town	28	14	4	10	62	61	+1	46	
9	Inkberrow	27	12	4	11	57	61	−4	40	
10	Coventrians	27	9	3	15	42	53	−11	30	
11	Burntwood Town	28	7	6	15	40	66	−26	27	Resigned from the league
12	Boldmere Sports & Social	28	8	2	18	42	60	−18	26	
13	Enville Athletic	27	7	3	17	40	69	−29	24	
14	Perrywood	27	3	6	18	37	99	−62	15	Resigned from the league
15	AFC Solihull	28	2	2	24	32	105	−73	5 (Note: AFC Solihull 3 points deducted.)	
16	Badsey Rangers	0	0	0	0	0	0	0	0	Club folded, record expunged

Source: fchd
Rules for classification: 1) points; 2) goal difference; 3) number of goals scored.
