= 2013–14 Midland Football Combination =

The 2013–14 Midland Football Combination season was the 77th and final in the history of Midland Football Combination, a football competition in England.

At the end of the season, the Midland Alliance and the Midland Combination merged to form the Midland Football League. The Midland Alliance clubs formed the Premier Division, while the Midland Combination clubs formed Division One.

== Premier Division ==
Midland Football Combination Premier Division
- Season: 2013–14
- Champions: Brocton
- Promoted: Brocton
- Matches: 306
- Goals: 1,174 (3.84 per match)

The Premier Division featured 17 clubs which competed in the division last season, along with two new clubs:

- Alvis Sporting Club, promoted from Division One
- Studley, relegated from the Midland Football Alliance

=== League table ===
Pos	Team	Pld	W	D	L	GF	GA	GD	Pts	Promotion or relegation
1	Brocton	34	25	6	3	100	49	+51	81	Promoted to the Midland Football League Premier Division
2	Bromsgrove Sporting	34	23	3	8	92	35	+57	72	
3	Nuneaton Griff	34	20	4	10	96	75	+21	64	
4	Bolehall Swifts	34	18	6	10	73	50	+23	60	
5	Atherstone Town	34	18	6	10	75	55	+20	60	
6	Studley	34	16	8	10	64	54	+10	56	
7	Lichfield City	34	13	11	10	52	50	+2	50	
8	Stafford Town	34	14	8	12	56	57	−1	50	
9	Alvis Sporting Club	34	14	8	12	69	79	−10	50	
10	Southam United	34	14	5	15	62	80	−18	47	
11	Littleton	34	14	4	16	74	60	+14	46	
12	Racing Club Warwick	34	11	7	16	60	63	−3	40	
13	Earlswood Town	34	11	4	19	47	66	−19	37	Demoted to Midland Football League Division Two
14	Blackwood	34	11	4	19	49	74	−25	37	Resigned from the league and folded
15	Pershore Town	34	10	3	21	57	80	−23	33	
16	Coventry Copsewood	34	8	10	16	54	77	−23	33 (Note: 1 point deducted)	
17	Pilkington XXX	34	6	8	20	53	77	−24	26	
18	Pelsall Villa	34	5	5	24	41	93	−52	20	
19	Castle Vale JKS	0	0	0	0	0	0	0	0	Club folded, record expunged

Source: fchd
Rules for classification: 1) points; 2) goal difference; 3) number of goals scored.

=== Results ===
Home \ Away	ALV	ATH	BLA	BOS	BRO	BRS	COV	EAR	LIC	LIT	NUN	PEL	PER	PIL	RCW	SOU	STA	STU
Alvis Sporting Club		2–3	2–0	2–1	0–3	0–6	3–2	1–1	2–2	1–2	0–2	8–1	3–1	1–1	2–5	2–1	5–2	3–2
Atherstone Town	4–3		2–3	0–4	2–4	1–2	2–1	2–1	0–0	2–1	4–1	1–1	2–0	3–1	2–2	3–0	2–0	3–2
Blackwood	3–4	0–4		1–5	1–2	0–4	0–0	2–2	2–0	0–4	4–2	4–1	1–2	2–1	1–0	0–3	1–1	1–3
Bolehall Swifts	1–1	2–1	1–0		1–1	1–3	3–2	1–3	1–3	4–1	2–3	3–0	2–1	2–1	2–2	2–3	3–1	5–0
Brocton	5–1	2–1	5–2	2–1		2–1	4–0	4–1	2–1	1–4	1–1	2–1	4–2	3–3	4–4	5–1	4–1	2–2
Bromsgrove Sporting	2–3	2–1	3–1	0–2	3–2		6–0	2–1	3–0	0–2	2–3	4–0	3–0	0–0	2–0	10–0	3–1	2–3
Coventry Copsewood	2–2	2–1	2–5	1–4	1–3	0–4		4–1	2–2	2–1	4–2	2–0	4–3	3–2	2–2	2–3	1–1	1–1
Earlswood Town	0–3	1–3	1–2	2–0	0–1	2–0	2–1		1–2	0–2	2–1	4–1	0–3	1–4	1–2	2–5	1–1	1–2
Lichfield City	4–1	1–3	3–3	2–3	1–1	3–1	2–0	1–0		4–2	1–0	1–1	2–1	2–3	0–1	1–1	3–2	2–1
Littleton	7–0	4–2	3–0	0–1	1–3	2–2	1–1	2–3	3–0		1–2	3–4	2–2	5–0	1–2	0–4	1–4	1–3
Nuneaton Griff	2–2	0–5	3–2	2–2	4–5	2–2	5–1	5–1	4–0	5–4		2–1	4–2	3–2	3–0	2–0	6–2	2–6
Pelsall Villa	3–1	2–4	0–1	1–3	1–7	0–2	4–3	0–1	1–1	2–1	3–4		1–2	4–2	0–7	0–1	0–0	2–3
Pershore Town	4–0	2–3	0–1	3–2	3–4	0–4	1–1	1–3	2–1	0–2	0–4	4–2		3–2	2–1	3–5	2–3	1–3
Pilkington XXX	1–3	0–1	1–0	3–4	1–2	1–2	0–3	1–4	1–1	1–4	4–2	1–1	3–3		1–2	4–1	1–1	1–1
Racing Club Warwick	2–3	1–1	0–1	2–1	1–3	1–2	2–2	1–2	1–2	1–3	2–3	2–1	2–0	2–5		1–4	4–4	0–1
Southam United	3–3	2–2	4–1	1–1	0–3	0–4	3–1	3–0	0–3	3–3	3–7	2–1	1–2	2–0	1–4		0–2	0–3
Stafford Town	1–2	2–2	2–1	1–2	1–0	1–4	2–1	2–1	0–0	0–1	4–1	4–0	3–1	2–0	1–0	2–0		2–1
Studley	0–0	4–3	4–3	1–1	1–4	0–2	0–0	1–1	1–1	1–0	1–4	3–1	2–1	4–1	0–1	1–2	3–0	

Legend: Blue = home team win; Yellow = draw; Red = away team win.

== Division One ==
Midland Football Combination Division One
- Season: 2013–14
- Champions: Cadbury Athletic
- Promoted: Cadbury Athletic

The Division One featured 13 clubs which competed in the division last season, along with two new clubs, promoted from Division Two:

- Barnt Green Spartak
- Sutton United

=== League table ===
Pos	Team	Pld	W	D	L	GF	GA	GD	Pts	Promotion or relegation
1	Cadbury Athletic	28	21	4	3	93	26	+67	67	Promoted to the Midland Football League Division One
2	Fairfield Villa	28	17	5	6	67	33	+34	56	
3	Phoenix United	28	17	5	6	73	44	+29	56	Resigned from the league
4	Sutton United	28	16	7	5	68	32	+36	55	
5	Aston	28	18	1	9	62	43	+19	55	
6	Chelmsley Town	28	13	5	10	45	48	−3	44	
7	Hampton	28	12	7	9	53	49	+4	43	
8	Feckenham	28	11	6	11	49	50	−1	39	
9	West Midlands Police	28	8	8	12	46	59	−13	32	Resigned from the league
10	Shirley Town	28	10	2	16	36	59	−23	32	Resigned from the league
11	Knowle	28	8	6	14	29	47	−18	30	
12	Barnt Green Spartak	28	7	6	15	43	53	−10	27	
13	Droitwich Spa	28	7	4	17	46	71	−25	25	
14	FC Glades Sporting	28	5	4	19	35	73	−38	19	
15	Coton Green	28	2	6	20	22	80	−58	12	

Source: fchd
Rules for classification: 1) points; 2) goal difference; 3) number of goals scored.

== Division Two ==
Midland Football Combination Division Two
- Season: 2013–14
- Champions: Kenilworth Town
- Promoted: Kenilworth Town; Coventry United; Paget Rangers

The Division Two featured 11 clubs which competed in the division last season, along with six new clubs:

- Northfield Town, relegated from Division One
- Austrey Rangers
- Badsey Rangers
- Coventry United
- Paget Rangers
- Rostance Edwards

=== League table ===
Pos	Team	Pld	W	D	L	GF	GA	GD	Pts	Promotion or relegation
1	Kenilworth Town	30	22	3	5	90	48	+42	69	Promoted to the Midland Football League Division Two
2	Coventry United	30	22	2	6	105	33	+72	68	Promoted to the Midland Football League Division Two
3	Paget Rangers	30	20	6	4	98	33	+65	66	Promoted to the Midland Football League Division Two
4	Badsey Rangers	30	16	7	7	69	39	+30	55	
5	Rostance Edwards	30	15	6	9	72	59	+13	51	
6	Leamington Hibs	30	14	7	9	48	40	+8	49	
7	Alcester Town	30	15	4	11	79	71	+8	46 (Note: Alcester Town were deducted three points.)	
8	Barton United	30	13	4	13	48	65	−17	43	
9	Polesworth	30	12	6	12	59	90	−31	42	Resigned from the league
10	Perrywood	30	12	4	14	58	50	+8	40	
11	Enville Athletic	30	10	3	17	59	62	−3	33	
12	Austrey Rangers	30	10	3	17	55	64	−9	33	
13	Northfield Town	30	9	6	15	45	63	−18	33	
14	FC Stratford	30	6	3	21	43	92	−49	21	
15	Burntwood Town	30	5	4	21	54	102	−48	19	
16	Inkberrow	30	2	6	22	39	110	−71	12	
17	Rugeley Rangers	0	0	0	0	0	0	0	0	Club folded, record expunged

Source: fchd
Rules for classification: 1) points; 2) goal difference; 3) number of goals scored.
