= Quentin Townsend =

English footballer

Personal information
- Date of birth: 13 February 1977 (age 49)
- Place of birth: Worcester, England
- Position: Centre back

Team information
- Current team: Droitwich Spa (manager)

Youth career
- Wolverhampton Wanderers

Senior career*
Years	Team	Apps	(Gls)
1995–1996	Wolverhampton Wanderers	0	(0)
1996–1997	Hereford United	7	(0)
- Worcester City
- Stourport Swifts
- Stourbridge
- Cinderford Town
- Racing Club Warwick
- Southam United
- Pershore Town

Managerial career
- 2014–2015: Southam United
- 2015–2018: Pershore Town
- 2018–2024: Stourport Swifts
- 2026–: Droitwich Spa
- * Club domestic league appearances and goals

Quentin Townsend (born 13 February 1977) is an English football coach and former player who is the manager of Hellenic League Premier Division club Droitwich Spa. During his playingcareer he played as a centre back. He played in the Football League for Hereford United.

== Playing career ==
Townsend began his career as a trainee with Wolverhampton Wanderers, but despite signing professional terms with the club, he never played a first-team match for the club.

He moved to Third Division Hereford United in Summer 1996, on a free transfer, where he reunited with his former Wolves manager Graham Turner.

The defender made his senior debut on 17 August 1996, in a 0–1 defeat at Fulham, and went on to make ten appearances in total, for the club in the football league. At the end of the season, the team suffered relegation from the Football League and Townsend was released.

After leaving Hereford, Townsend signed for his hometown club Worcester City, before having a good semi pro career, representing a number of non-league clubs in the Midlands.

== Coaching career ==
He recently managed Stourport Swifts in the Midland Premier Division, after a 3 year long spell at Pershore Town.

On 7 June 2026 Droitwich Spa announced they had secured the services of Townsend for the 2026–27 Season.
