= Coventry Copsewood F.C. =

Association football club in England

Coordinates: 52°23′29.97″N 1°28′18.07″W

Coventry Copsewood
- Full name: Coventry Copsewood Football Club
- Nickname: Copses
- Founded: 1922 (as Peel Connor)
- Ground: Allard Way; Coventry
- Capacity: 2,000
- Chairman: Craig Watson
- Manager: Ryan Baldwin and Stuart Ryan
- League: Midland League Division One
- 2024–25: Midland League Division One, 11th of 22
Home colours	Away colours

Coventry Copsewood F.C. are a football club based in Coventry, West Midlands, England. In 2005, they changed their name from Coventry Marconi to their present name. Currently, they are members of the Midland League Division One.

== History ==
=== Name ===
The club was formed in 1922 by employees of Peel Connor, and was known as the 'Connor'. They played in the Coventry District League until 1926 when due to an amalgamation with Magnito Ltd, they were renamed Magnet FC. They continued playing under this name until 1934 when they changed again to GEC (Cov) FC. This name stuck for longer, lasting until the 1970s when they became GPT (Coventry) FC, and then changed again in 1999 to Marconi (Coventry) FC, and then when Marconi sold off their land in 2006, it became Coventry Copsewood FC.

=== On the pitch ===
During its early years, the team played in the District and Works League, and had success in the post war years, and then again in the 1970s when they won their league's internal cup four times, the Coventry Evening Telegraph Cup three years running and the Birmingham Junior Cup twice. In 1993, the club applied to join the Midland Football Combination. They finished 5th in each of their first five years in Division Two, but gained promotion due to their facilities. In the 1996–97 season, they did the double in Division One, and were promoted to the Premier Division.

In the early part of the 21st century, manager Paul Mills led the club to several finishes near the top of the table, and qualification for the later stages of their cup competitions, being runners-up in the Telegraph Cup twice, winning the Coventry Charity Cup three times and winning the Tony Allden Cup. Since then, with the departure of Mills, they underwent a rebuilding process and finished mid-table in 2005–06, but slipped to near the bottom of the division in 2006–07. In 2008, the club reached the Telegraph Cup Final. In the 2010–11 season, they reached both the League Cup Final and Telegraph Final. In the next season, the club won the Coventry Charity Cup.

== Ground ==
The team play their home games at Allard Way, which is often used for local cup finals. Although, around the pitch there is one small stand and a small covered shelter behind one goal. The team have a two-storey clubhouse which they share with the other sports clubs which together make up the Copsewood Sports and Social Club.

== Seasons ==
Year	League	Level	P	W	D	L	F	A	GD	Pts	Position	FA Cup
2006–07	Midland Football Combination	10	40	8	11	21	39	78	+39	35	20th of 21	DNP
2007–08	Midland Football Combination	10	42	9	11	22	57	84	+27	38	21st of 22	DNP
2008–09	Midland Football Combination	10	40	16	8	16	75	66	+9	56	9th of 21	DNP
2009–10	Midland Football Combination	10	42	22	11	9	81	55	+26	77	5th of 22	DNP
2010–11	Midland Football Combination	10	36	21	4	11	75	49	+26	67	4th of 19	DNP
2011–12	Midland Football Combination	10	32	18	6	8	58	30	+28	60	3rd of 17	DNP
2012–13	Midland Football Combination	10	34	13	10	11	58	55	+3	49	12th of 18	DNP
2013–14	Midland Football Combination	10	34	8	10	16	54	77	-23	33 ^{†}	16th of 18 ^{†}	DNP
2014–15	Midland League Div. One	10	38	17	10	11	83	55	+28	60 ^{††}	8th of 20 ^{††}	DNP
2015–16	Midland League Div. One	10	38	15	9	14	75	78	-3	54	11th of 20	DNP
2016–17	Midland League Div. One	10	38	14	5	19	74	90	-16	47	12th of 20	DNP
2017–18	Midland League Div. One	10	42	16	4	22	65	91	−26	52	13th of 22	DNP
2018–19	Midland League Div. One	10	36	9	8	19	51	90	−39	35	15th of 19	DNP
2019–20	Midland League Div. One	10	29	9	2	18	40	67	−27	29	15th of 20	DNP
2020–21	Midland League Div. One	10	13	3	2	8	23	38	−15	11	15th of 19	DNP
2021–22	Midland League Div. One	10	36	9	5	22	57	83	−26	32	17th of 19	DNP
2022–23	Midland League Div. One	10	40	14	7	19	68	73	−5	49	12th of 21	DNP
2023–24	Midland League Div. One	10	38	14	9	15	71	65	+6	51	11th of 20	DNP
2024–25	Midland League Div. One	10	42								of 22	DNP

^{†} Coventry Copsewood deducted 1 point for fielding an ineligible player.
^{††} Coventry Copsewood deducted 1 point for fielding an ineligible player.

As a result of the COVID-19 pandemic, the 2019-20 competition was formally abandoned on 26 March 2020, with all results from the season being expunged, and no promotion or relegation taking place to, from, or within the competition.

The 2020–21 season started in September and was suspended in December a result of the COVID-19 pandemic in England. The league season was subsequently abandoned on 24 February 2021.

== Honours ==
- Midland Football Combination Premier Division Runners Up (1 time):
  - 2002–03
- Midland Combination Division One Champions (1 time):
  - 1996–97
- Best FA Vase run: 2nd round, 2001–02, 2010–11,2016–17

== Sources ==
- GPT Coventry at the Football Club History Database
- Marconi Coventry at the Football Club History Database
- Coventry Marconi at the Football Club History Database
- Coventry Copsewood at the Football Club History Database
