= Droitwich Spa F.C. =

Association football club in England

Coordinates: 52°20′07.54″N 2°16′50.61″W

Droitwich Spa
- Full name: Droitwich Spa Football Club
- Nickname: The Saltmen
- Founded: 1985
- Ground: King George V Ground
- Capacity: 2,000 (100 seated)
- Manager: Quentin Townsend
- League: Hellenic League Premier Division
- 2025–26: Hellenic League Premier Division, 3rd of 20
- Website: https://www.pitchero.com/clubs/droitwichspafootballclub

Droitwich Spa Football Club is a football club representing the town of Droitwich Spa, Worcestershire, England. They are currently members of the Hellenic League Premier Division and played at King George V Fields until 2017. For the 2017–18 season they ground shared at Stourport Swifts' Walshes Meadow. The club returned to Droitwich during the 2022–23 season with the completion of redevelopment work at their King George V ground. The ground was officially opened on 10 November 2022 by former England national football team player and manager Kevin Keegan. The team are known as 'The Saltmen'.

== History ==
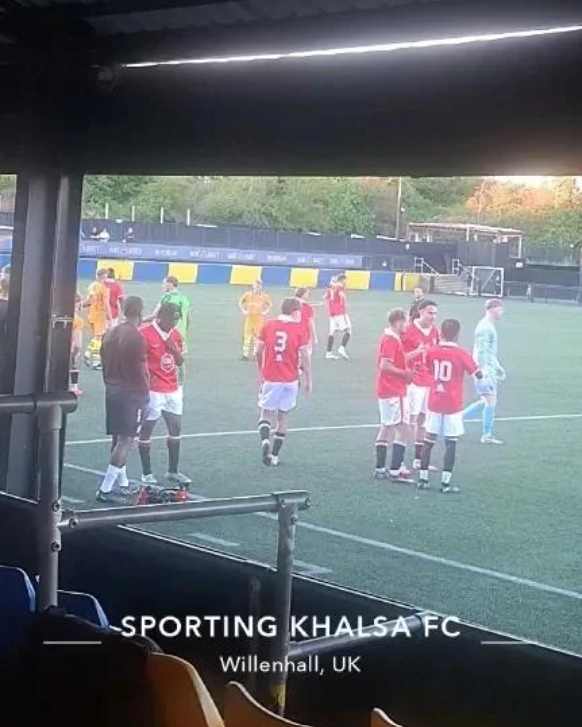
Droitwich Spa's first ever win in the FA Cup was against Dudley Town on 7 August 2026.

The club was established in 1985 as a Sunday league club, only moving into Saturday football in 2000, when they joined the Midland Combination. In 2006–07 the club finished third in Division Two, earning promotion to Division One. In 2014 the league merged with the Midland Football Alliance to form the Midland League, with the club becoming members of Division Two.

In 2016–17 Droitwich ended the season as Division Two champions and were set to be promoted to Division One. However, they received a controversial points deduction after the season had ended, which led to them dropping to third place in the table. Although they remained in Division Two, the club entered the FA Vase in the 2017–18 season.

The club faced Worcester City in the first round of the Worcestershire Senior Cup during the 2022–23 season. This is the first time the two sides have played against each other in formal competition. The match ended in a 3–0 win for Droitwich Spa in front of 973 spectators at the King George V Ground.

The club guaranteed their promotion from the Hellenic Football League Division One after a 2–0 victory at Shortwood United on 30 March 2025. This was the club's first ever promotion to Step 5 and FA Cup qualification for the 2025–26 season, which also celebrates the club's 40th anniversary year.

In June 2026 it was announced that long term manager Andy Crowther was to step down after a period of at the club where they achieved two promotions and reached three play off finals together . The club confirmed that ex Wolves and Hereford United player Quentin Townsend would be joining for the 2026/27 campaign.

== Honours ==
- Hellenic Football League
  - Division One Champions: 2024–25

== Records ==
- Best FA Cup performance: Preliminary round, 2026–27
- Best FA Vase performance: Third round, 2024–25
