= Walsall Wood F.C. =

Association football club in England

Coordinates: 52°37′52.12″N 1°55′46.41″W

Walsall Wood
- Full name: Walsall Wood Community Football Club
- Nickname: The Wood
- Founded: 1915; 111 years ago
- Ground: John Sylvester Stadium
- Manager: Adam Pearce
- League: Midland League Division Three
- 2025–26: Midland League Division Three, 5th of 15
Home colours

Walsall Wood Football Club is an association football club based in Walsall Wood, near Walsall in the West Midlands, England. Nicknamed "the Wood", they are currently members of the Midland League Division Three and play their home games at Oak Park.

== History ==
The club was formed in the early part of the 20th century, although the exact date is unknown, the earliest surviving records being from 1915. The club's original name was Walsall Wood Ebenezer Primitive Methodists, stemming from its affiliation with a local Methodist chapel. It is from this that the team's former nickname derives.

In the inter-war years they were considered amongst the strongest non-league teams in the region, and won the Walsall Senior Cup in 1923 and the Walsall Senior League in 1946 and 1947. The club joined the Worcestershire Combination in 1951, winning the championship at the very first attempt and finishing as runner-up five times in the next decade. In 1982 it merged with Walsall Sportsco; the new entity became known as Walsall Borough F.C. and continued to play in the Combination. The club re-adopted the Walsall Wood name in 1986.

The Wood switched to the Staffordshire Senior League for one season in 1992 before relocating once again to the West Midlands (Regional) League, starting in Division One but gaining promotion to the Premier Division at the first attempt. In 2000 the team finished in 21st place and were relegated, but an appeal to the FA saw them reinstated in the top flight.

In 2006, due to a redrafting of the league boundaries, the Wood returned to the Midland Combination after 14 years of absence.

Walsall Wood won the Midland Combination Premier Division in the 2012–13 season and secured promotion to the Midland Football Alliance, the highest level the club has competed at to date. During this season The Wood also progressed to the quarter-finals of the FA Vase before being knocked out in a replay away at Guernsey.

At the end of the 2016–17 season, after four seasons at step 5, Walsall Wood suffered relegation to the Midland League Division One after management changes, and a sharp decline in performances led to the club finding itself involved in a relegation scrap. For the 2017–18 season Wood were managed by former Walsall player Gary Birch. The season was one of the most successful seasons in the club's history. Walsall Wood won the MFL Division One title and the MFL League Cup, as well as losing on penalties in the Walsall Senior Cup final.

They were promoted to step 4 of the National League System in the 2022–23 season, crowned as MFL Premier Division Champions, for the first time in the club's history. . In October 2023 Harry Harris departed the club after two years and the club appointed Ian Long as manager. In 2023–24, the club had its first ever season in the FA Trophy. Reaching the third round, they were drawn at home to Coalville Town. Despite being drawn at home, the tie was reversed due to numerous postponements, and Walsall Wood lost 2–0. In October 2024, after just 11 months in charge, Ian Long resigned as manager along with his backroom staff.

On 29 October, the club resigned from the NPL Midlands Division with immediate effect due to insufficient funds.

== Badge ==
The club's badge incorporates the winding gear of a coal mine (symbolising the area's coal mining tradition), a cross (representing the club's original affiliation with a Methodist chapel), a castle, representing a castle which once stood in the area, and an oak tree, symbolising the "Shire Oak", a former local landmark after which Oak Park, and the surrounding area is named. The club's motto is "Pro Bono Silvae" which is Latin for "for the good of the wood".

== Ground ==
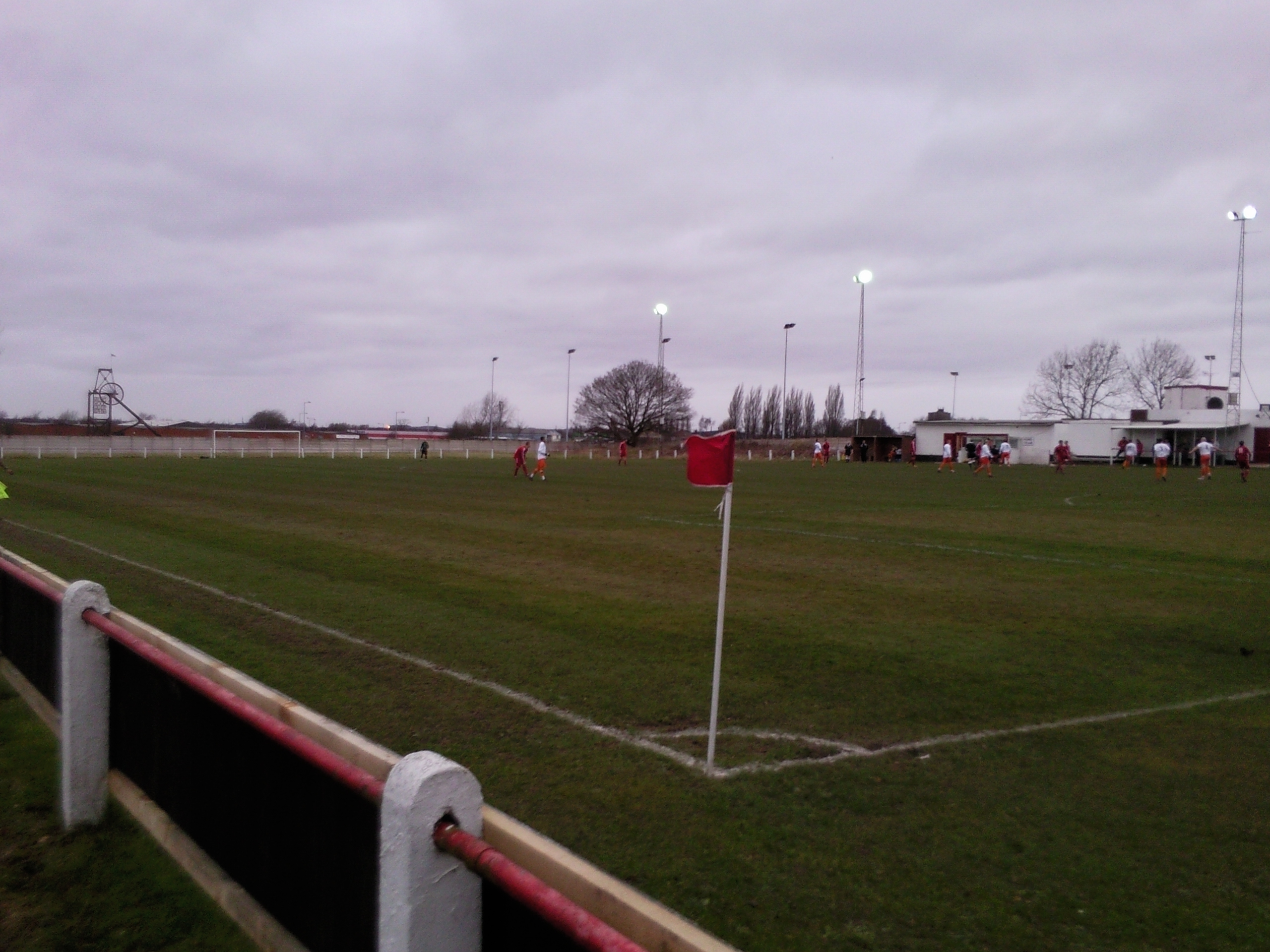
Walsall Wood's home ground, Oak Park. Visible at the extreme left is a memorial to the area's mining heritage, which stands behind the stadium.

The Oak Park ground boasts a stand which dates from the 1930s, which the club claim is the only surviving stand of its type in England. Wolverhampton Wanderers visited the ground for its official opening. Over the last few years the ground has undergone a lot of renovations to bring it up to standard for step 5 football. Behind the far goal there is a memorial to the area's mining heritage, which lends the ground a very traditional feel.

Oak Park was permanently renamed the John Sylvester Stadium from the 2023–24 season as a tribute to the club's former chairman who died during the previous season.

== Club honours ==
- Midland Football League Premier Division
  - Winners: 2022–23
- Worcestershire Combination/Midland Combination
  - Winners: 1951–52, 2012–13
  - Runners-up: 1953–54, 1954–55, 1957–58, 1958–59, 1960–61
- Midland Combination League Cup
  - Runners-up: 2012–13
- Walsall & District League
  - 1933-34
- Walsall Senior Cup
  - Winners: 1922–23 (joint), 1934–35 (joint), 1945–46, 1946-47, 1951–52, 1957–58, 1960–61
  - Runners-up: 1925–26, 1946—47, 1950–51, 1956–57, 1958–59, 1959–60, 1981–82
- Staffordshire FA Challenge Cup
  - Winners: 1953–54
  - Runners-up: 1922–23, 1934–35
- JW Hunt Cup
  - Runners-up: 1932–33, 1948–49
- Wednesbury Charity Cup
  - Winners: 2001–02, 2005–06
- Midland Football League Cup
  - Runners-up: 2015–16
  - Winners: 2017–18

== Club records ==
Walsall Wood vs Guernsey in the 2012–13 FA Vase

- Best league performance: Midlands League Premier Division Winners 2022–23 (Promoted to Northern Premier League)
- Best FA Cup performance: 2nd qualifying round, 1988–89
- Best FA Vase performance: Semi-finals, 2020–21
- Best FA Trophy performance: Third round, 2023–24

== See also ==
- Walsall Wood F.C. players
- Walsall Wood F.C. managers
