= Brocton F.C. =

Association football club in England

Coordinates: 52°47′25.580″N 2°5′56.119″W

Brocton
- Full name: Brocton Football Club
- Nickname: The Badgers
- Founded: 1937
- Ground: Silkmore Lane, Stafford
- Chairman: Nigel Pepper
- Manager: Alex Curtis
- League: Midland League Premier Division
- 2024–25: Midland League Premier Division, 5th of 18
Home colours	Away colours

Brocton Football Club is a football club representing Brocton, near Stafford, England. They are currently members of the Midland League Premier Division and play at Silkmore Lane in Stafford.

== History ==
The club was formed in 1937 after the owner of the Chetwynd Arms pub, Arthur Mayer, gave a football to local boys and asked them to establish a club. In 1946–47 they won the Rugeley & District League. After winning the league again the following season, they moved on to the Cannock Chase League. The club were champions of the new league in 1954–55, before going on to win the title again in 1954–55, 1956–57, 1957–58, 1960–61, 1973–74 and 1977–78. The next step was to move up to Division One of the Staffordshire County League (South). They were runners-up in 1982–83, and after finishing second again the following season, the club were promoted to the Premier Division, where they finished as runners-up in 1985–86.

In 1991 Brocton joined the Staffordshire Senior League, which became the Midland League in 1994. In 2003 the club transferred to the Premier Division of the Midland Combination. After winning the Premier Division in the league's final season, they became members of the Premier Division of the new Midland League, which was formed by a merger of the Midland Combination and Midland Alliance. They finished second-from-bottom of the division in 2016–17 and were relegated to Division One.

At the end of the 2020–21 season Brocton were transferred to Division One South of the North West Counties League. They finished fourth in the division in 2022–23, qualifying for the promotion play-offs, in which they lost 3–1 to Sandbach United in the semi-finals. The following season saw them win the Division One South title, earning promotion to the Premier Division of the Midland League.

Brocton finished fifth in the Premier Division in 2024–25, before losing 3–2 to Shifnal Town in the play-off semi-finals.

== Ground ==
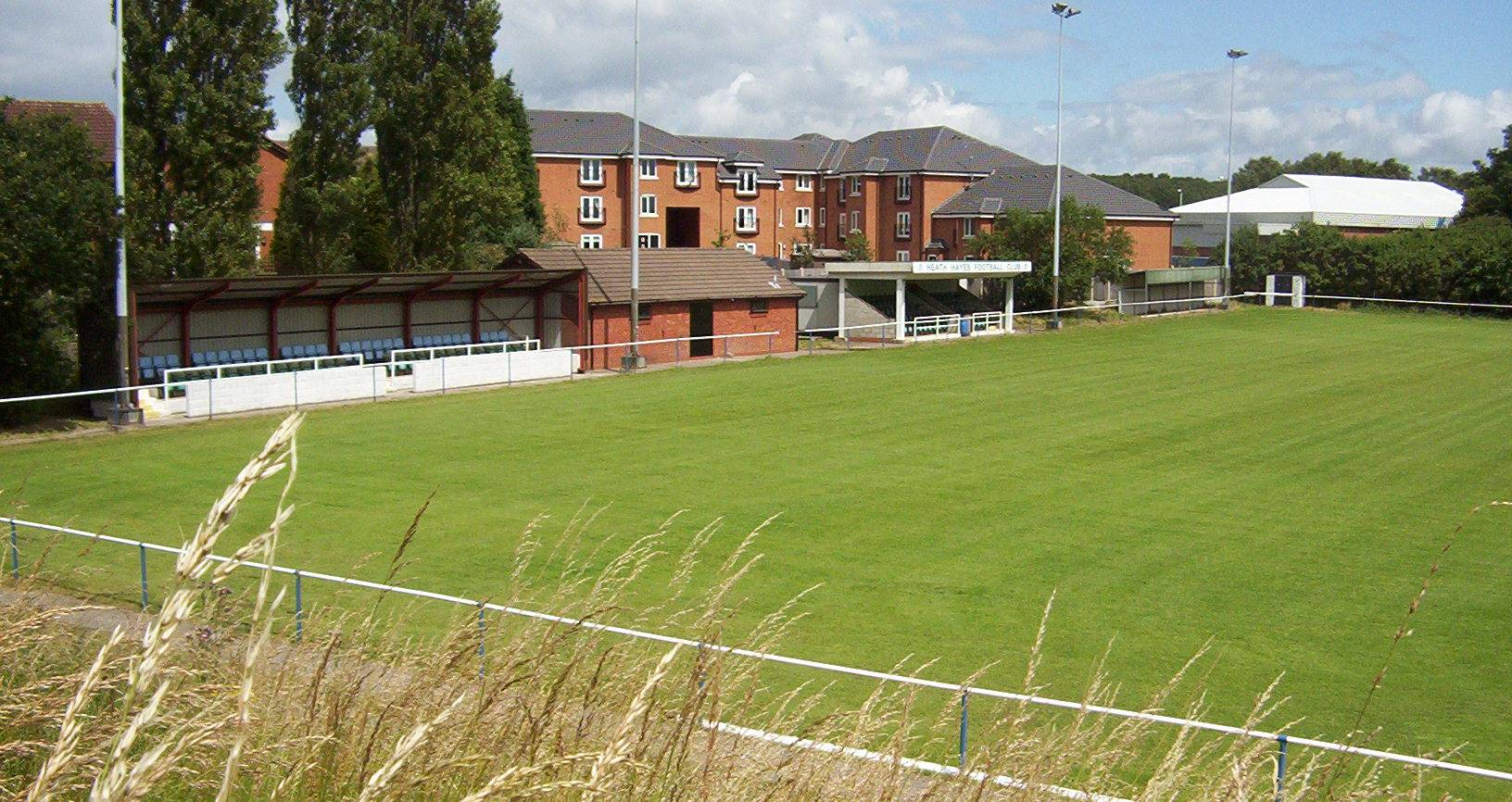
The Coppice Colliery Ground in Heath Hayes, the club's former home

The club originally played at the Chetwynd Arms Ground in Brocton, but had to move to the Rowley Park Stadium in Stafford to meet the requirements of the Staffordshire Senior League. In 2002 they relocated once again to the Cannock Sports Stadium in Cannock in order to have a floodlit ground, but left in 2004 after the Council failed to confirm their tenancy. After two years sharing with Heath Hayes at the Coppice Colliery Ground, the club gained a 30-year lease on the Old Police Sports Ground in Silkmore Lane in Stafford. The ground includes a 100-seat stand.

== Honours ==
- North West Counties League
  - Division One South champions 2023–24
- Midland Combination
  - Premier Division champions 2013–14
- Cannock Chase League
  - Champions 1954–55, 1956–57, 1957–58, 1960–61, 1973–74, 1977–78
- Rugeley & District League
  - Champions 1946–47, 1947–48
- Staffordshire FA Vase
  - Winners 1996–97, 1999–2000

== Records ==
- Best FA Cup performance: First qualifying round, 2013–14
- Best FA Vase performance: Fourth round, 2014–15
- Record attendance: 565 vs Stafford Town, North West Counties League Division One South, 1 April 2024
