= Hinckley A.F.C. =

Association football club in England

Coordinates: 52°34′21″N 1°20′28″W

Hinckley AFC
- Full name: Hinckley Association Football Club
- Founded: 2014; 12 years ago
- Ground: Kirkby Road, Barwell, Leicestershire
- Capacity: 2500 (256 seated)
- Chairman: Bryan White
- Manager: Ross Innes, Adam Davies and Chris Tullin
- League: United Counties League Premier Division South
- 2024–25: United Counties League Premier Division South, 9th of 19
- Website: http://www.hinckleyafc.co.uk/
Home colours	Away colours

Hinckley Association Football Club is a football club, from Hinckley, Leicestershire, who play home games at Barwell F.C.'s Kirkby Road. The club was formed in January 2014 when fans of the dissolved Hinckley United formed their own Community Trust football club, owned and democratically run by its supporters. The club competes in the United Counties League Premier Division South.

== History ==
Following the demise of Hinckley United in October 2013, a working group was formed and at a public meeting in December announced their intentions to form a co-operative community trust to launch a new football club for Hinckley. After discussions with Supporters Direct, the working group decided to adopt the same model as F.C. United of Manchester and AFC Wimbledon with a membership scheme allowing a 'one member one vote' ethos. In January 2014, at the next public meeting it was voted that the name of the new football club would be Hinckley AFC. Further to that, in February 2014, the club's badge and playing colours were voted on. The club crest chosen represented the town's history and future, and the playing colours would be a home kit of red and blue, with away colours of violet and white. At that same meeting, the working group announced a bid by a local businessman to purchase the De Montfort Park ground, and that his favoured tenant for the stadium would be Hinckley AFC.

In March 2014, the working group announced that the co-operative trust had finalised its constitution. Members were informed that the club had applied to join the Midland Alliance, but would have to wait until the FA had fully scrutinised the business plan before they would make a final decision.

The club were informed in June 2014 that they had been allocated a place in the newly formed Midland Football League First Division, level 6 of the Non League Pyramid.

The club won their opening league game 3-0 away at Southam United and a week later set a club record victory beating Pelsall Villa 13–0, but a run of seven games without winning followed, leaving the club in the bottom reaches of the league table. On 18 October, Hinckley AFC beat Cadbury Athletic 2–1, and then proceeded to set a Midland League record of 26 games unbeaten in a season culminating with a final day victory over Southam United winning 5–1. This unbeaten run lifted Hinckley AFC into a final league position of 3rd, ahead of Bolehall Swifts by virtue of goals scored. In cup competitions, an early exit in the FA Vase losing 2-1 at Tipton Town was balanced by reaching the final of the Leicestershire and Rutland Senior Cup, finishing runners-up to Bardon Hill, losing 1–0.

That on-field success continued into the start of the 2015–16 season, when they overturned a Redditch United side from three levels higher in the non-league pyramid to reach the Second Qualifying Round of the FA Cup in their first campaign in the competition. That season, the club finished fifth in the league and won their first piece of silverware: going one better than the previous season by winning the Leicestershire and Rutland Senior Cup with a 5–1 victory over Oakham United in the Final.

The following season, 2016-17, Hinckley AFC were runners up to Bromsgrove Sporting, though were still 19 points behind as Sporting ran away with the league. Since then, a couple of mid-table finishes led to a series of managerial changes, and in 2019, the appointment of Courtney Belford was confirmed, but the COVID-19 regulations of 2019 and 2020 have prevented the completion of either of those seasons.

In May 2021, in the restructure of the Non League System at steps 5 and 6 of the non league pyramid Hinckley AFC were initially placed in the Midland Football League. Following a successful appeal to the FA in June 2021, the club was laterally transferred to the United Counties League Division One.

In September 2021, Hinckley AFC set a new club record score beating St Martins in the FA Vase 18–0, this score also being the biggest win in the history of the FA Vase.

Seven years on from their first piece of silverware, the club lifted the Midland League Cup in May 2023, defeating higher-level Whitchurch Alport in the final. The following season saw the club promoted to the Midland Premier Division as champions.

== Colours and crest ==
Historically the football clubs in Hinckley have either played in red, blue or a mixture of both. Hinckley Athletic played in red, Hinckley Town played in blue, and Hinckley United played in red & blue. The fans of Hinckley AFC voted to keep the tradition and the new club's home colours would be red & blue. The away kit was voted as being violet & white.

Six designs of club crest were presented to members to vote on, each representing the town of Hinckley in a different way. The crest voted for by the members was an amalgamation of all the designs incorporating elements of each. The Arms of Honour of Hinckley (white & red divided vertically with a serrated line) has long been established with Hinckley, relating to Simon de Montfort, 6th Earl of Leicester famously represented in a stained glass window at Chartres Cathedral, and has been incorporated in the previous clubs football crests, schools and other establishments in the town of Hinckley. The White Lion rampant also represents Simon de Montfort, considered to be one of the progenitors of modern parliamentary democracy, and represents the one member one vote ethos of the club. The Hansom Cab represents part of the history of Hinckley, as Joseph Hansom first developed and tested his Hansom Cab design in Hinckley. Finally the Phoenix represents the rebirth of the new football club after the dissolving of Hinckley United.

== Ground ==
In March 2014, Steve and Joy Jelfs, who run a local business in Hinckley, and founder members of Hinckley AFC, made a bid to BDO Liquidators in regards to the De Montfort Park Stadium, former home of Hinckley United. Subsequently, Hinckley AFC entered an agreement with the Jelfs family for a 50-year lease upon completion of the Stadium purchase. The bid was accepted by the creditors of Hinckley United Ltd, but legal issues regarding ownership and security of tenure, meant that any purchase could not be completed.

On 31 March 2014, Hinckley AFC announced plans to ground share at St John's Park the home of Heather St John's, for the 2014–15 season. Hinckley AFC have since ground shared at Heather St John up to the 2017–18 season.

On 9 April 2018, the club announced an agreement had been reached to play home matches at the Miners Welfare Ground in Ibstock for the 2018–19 season, the former home of Ibstock United and the previous home of the Hinckley AFC under 18's team.

On 30 March 2020, the club announced a three-year agreement to move to Barwell FC Kirkby Road ground.

In December 2021, the club announced that a further 10-year agreement had been signed by the club allowing them to remain at Barwell FC Kirby Road ground until the end of season 2031–32.

== Managers ==
On 6 May 2014 Hinckley AFC announced the appointment of the club's first manager, Carl Abbott, former manager of Wolverhampton Casuals. He was joined by his assistant, Paul Tomlinson and coach Simon Mellor. On 3 October 2017, Abbott stepped down from his role as manager after three and a half successful years in charge, in order to take the managerial position at Market Drayton Town, with his fellow backroom staff joining him at his new club.

Two days later it was announced that former Hinckley United player and manager Dean Thomas would take interim charge of the team whilst the search for a new man continued. On 13 October 2017, Dale Belford was appointed as the new permanent manager, with Richard Lavery to assist him alongside his playing duties. However, after just over two months in charge, Belford stepped down as manager on 27 December 2017.

Richard Lavery took on the role of interim manager whilst continuing his playing duties, alongside former first team coach Tom Cherry. Following mixed results and the conclusion of the 2017/18 season, the duo decided to step down from their roles at the club.

On 29 May 2018 Lavery's former player, James Jepson, took over as manager with John Ramshaw as his assistant. At the end of November Jepson resigned as manager after 21 competitive games in charge. Ramshaw, Jepson's assistant, took charge for the remainder of the 2018/2019 season.

In May 2019, Courtney Belford, son of former manager Dale Belford, was appointed as manager of Hinckley AFC.

In May 2022 manager Courtney Belford resigned due to other commitments and the club immediately announced the appointment of his assistant Joe Conneely as his successor.

== Backroom staff ==
As of March 23

Position	Staff
Manager	Vacant
Assistant Manager	Vacant
First Team Coach	Vacant
Director of Football	David Gunn
Head of Physiotherapy	Daniel White

== Honours ==
- Leicestershire and Rutland Senior Cup
  - Winners (1): 2015–16
  - Runners-up (1): 2014–15
- Midland Football League Cup
  - Winners (1): 2022–23
  - Runners-up (1): 2016–17
- Midland Football League Division One
  - Winners (1): 2023–24

== Seasons ==
Seasons 2019-20 and 2020-21 were both incomplete as curtailed due to COVID-19 restrictions.

Season	∆	Division	Pos	P	W	D	L	F	A	GD	Pts
2014–15	10	Midland Football League Division 1	3rd	38	23	7	8	106	53	+53	76
2015–16	10	Midland Football League Division 1	5th	38	23	6	9	116	53	+63	75
2016–17	10	Midland Football League Division 1	2nd	38	27	4	7	133	47	+86	85
2017–18	10	Midland Football League Division 1	6th	42	25	5	12	136	76	+60	80
2018–19	10	Midland Football League Division 1	16th	36	8	10	18	46	69	-23	34
2019–20	10	Midland Football League Division 1	8th	25	11	5	9	46	38	+8	38
2020–21	10	Midland Football League Division 1	4th	12	7	3	2	26	19	+7	24
2021–22	10	United Counties Football League Division 1	2nd	44	33	4	7	148	56	+92	103
2022–23	10	Midland Football League Division 1	3rd	40	28	3	9	122	51	+71	87

== Club records ==
- Best league performance: Midland Football League Division One, 1st, 2023–24
- Best FA Cup performance: 2nd Qualifying Round, 2015–16
- Best FA Vase performance: 5th Round, 2016–17
