= Quorn F.C. =

Association football club in England

Coordinates: 52°44′55.831″N 1°10′49.001″W

Quorn FC
- Full name: Quorn Football Club
- Nicknames: The Reds, The Methodists
- Founded: 1924
- Ground: Farley Way Stadium
- Capacity: 1,952
- Chairman: Stuart Turner
- Manager: Ryan Beswick
- League: Northern Premier League Premier Division
- 2025–26: Southern League Premier Division Central, 8th of 22 (transferred)
Home colours	Away colours

Quorn Football Club is an English football club based in the village of Quorn, near Loughborough, Leicestershire, currently playing in the Northern Premier League Premier Division. The club play their home games on the 3G pitch at their Farley Way Stadium, just off the A6, which runs between Leicester and Loughborough. The club are nicknamed "The Reds" due to their colours, as well "The Methodists", which is a nod to their historical name.

As well as the first team, Quorn operate an academy side from their Farley Way base. The academy features two teams which play in the English College's Football Association. There are also junior teams at Under 11 and Under 17 age groups. The Under 17s currently play in the Leicestershire Youth League, as well as the Leicestershire Midweek Floodlit Youth League.

== History ==
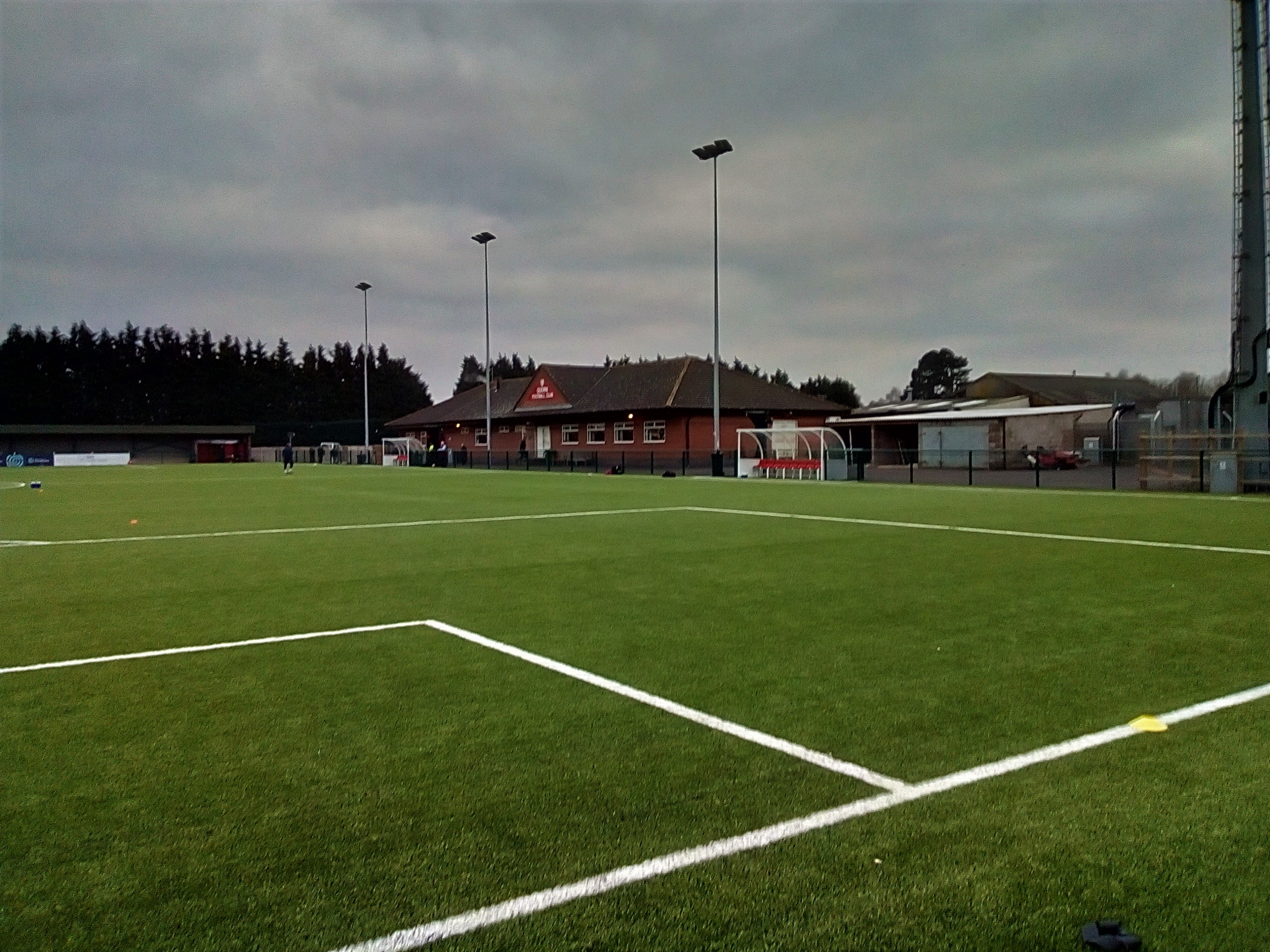
The clubhouse in 2019

The club was founded in 1924 by attendees of the local Wesleyan Chapel and accordingly was named Quorn Methodists F.C., changing its name in 1952. In 1937, the club joined the Leicestershire Senior League. Immediately after World War II they played in the Central Division, and then from 1948 in Division 2 after a league re-organisation. Quorn won this division in 1950 and then followed up by winning the first division the following season.

Over the next fifty years, the club moved up and down between the divisions on four occasions, finally cementing their place in the renamed Premier Division in the late 1990s, before claiming the league title, and with it promotion to the Midland Alliance in 2001.

In 2003, the club was the only one at its level to sell a player to a Football League team, when Luke Varney moved to Crewe Alexandra for £50,000.

In the 2006–07 season, they finished 3rd in the Midland Alliance and, due to the expansion of the Northern Premier League First Division into two regional divisions, were therefore accepted into the Northern Premier League Division One South. In May 2007, the club received a £500,000 windfall after Luke Varney's £2,000,000 move from Crewe Alexandra to Charlton Athletic.

In 2011, Quorn won the Westerby Cup for the first time with a 5–4 victory over Hinckley United at Walkers Stadium under the management of Lawrie Dudfield, but were relegated from the Northern Premier League Division One South during the same season.

John Folwell was appointed as their new manager in May 2013, joining from local rivals Barrow Town. He resigned in January 2015 due to disagreements with the chairman. Two time former manager Dougie Keast was agreed to take over until the end of the 2014–15 season one that Ashley white wouldn't forget scoring in the fa cup.

Dougie Keast remained at the helm until December 2017, when former Hinckley AFC manager Carl Abbott was appointed, joining the club from Northern Premier Division Market Drayton Town. On Wednesday 8 May 2019, Carl Abbott left Quorn AFC to join Evesham United FC.

Following the COVID-19 outbreak, the 2019/2020 playing season was expunged. Quorn was in first place in the United Counties league (Step 5) when the football season was terminated on 16 March 2020. Former Burton Albion and Scunthorpe United midfielder Cleveland Taylor was appointed as the first team manager on 1 May 2020. He left the club on 14 October 2021.

Richard Lavery, who had been Assistant Manager at Nuneaton Borough, took over with the club languishing at the wrong end of the table in the UCL Premier North. Fortunes turned immediately, with the club recovering to finish in the top half of the table. The following season Lavery led the side to the playoffs in dramatic fashion, as an injury time winner in the final game of the season lifted the club in to second place.

There was still work to be done though and a long journey to the Essex coast saw Quorn triumph 5–0 away to Great Wakering Rovers in the inter-step playoff, catapulting the club back up to step four, the highest level the club have achieved to date.

In their return to step four football, Quorn got off to a fast start and also enjoyed their best run in the FA Trophy. Victories at home over Coventry Sphinx, Leek Town and AFC Telford United saw The Reds through to the first round proper. The run came to and end in an away trip against Stafford Rangers. The club maintained a top half placing throughout the season, sitting in seventh place when Lavery left the club to take over at Kettering Town, taking his assistant Tom Cherry with him.

Ant Carney, who had been player/coach, stepped up to take charge against Gresley Rovers just two days later, assisted by Matt Green. The pair began their reign with a 2–1 win at The Moat Ground, an 85th-minute penalty by Ryan Beswick the difference on the day.

Carney guided the side to fifth place in the league, but lost out in the playoff semi-final, 3–1 away to Anstey Nomads. After taking a week to reflect, Carney decided to step down as Manager, also announcing his retirement from playing football.

== Recent managerial history ==
- Bob Steel (–2002)
- Dougie Keast (2002–2006)
- Marcus Law (2006–2007)
- Peter McGurk (2007–2008)
- Gavin O'Toole (2008–2009)
- Dougie Keast (2009–2011)
- Lawrie Dudfield (2011–2012)
- Craig Armstrong (2012)
- Tommy Brookbanks (2012)
- John Folwell (2013–2015)
- Dougie Keast (2015–2017)
- Carl Abbott (2017–2019)
- Martin Carruthers (May 2019 - Nov 2019)
- Willis Francis (Nov 2019 - February 2020)
- Russell Hoult (February 2020 to April 2020)
- Cleveland Taylor (May 2021 to October 2021)
- Richard Lavery (October 2021 to February 2024)
- Ant Carney (February 2024 to May 2024)

== Ground ==
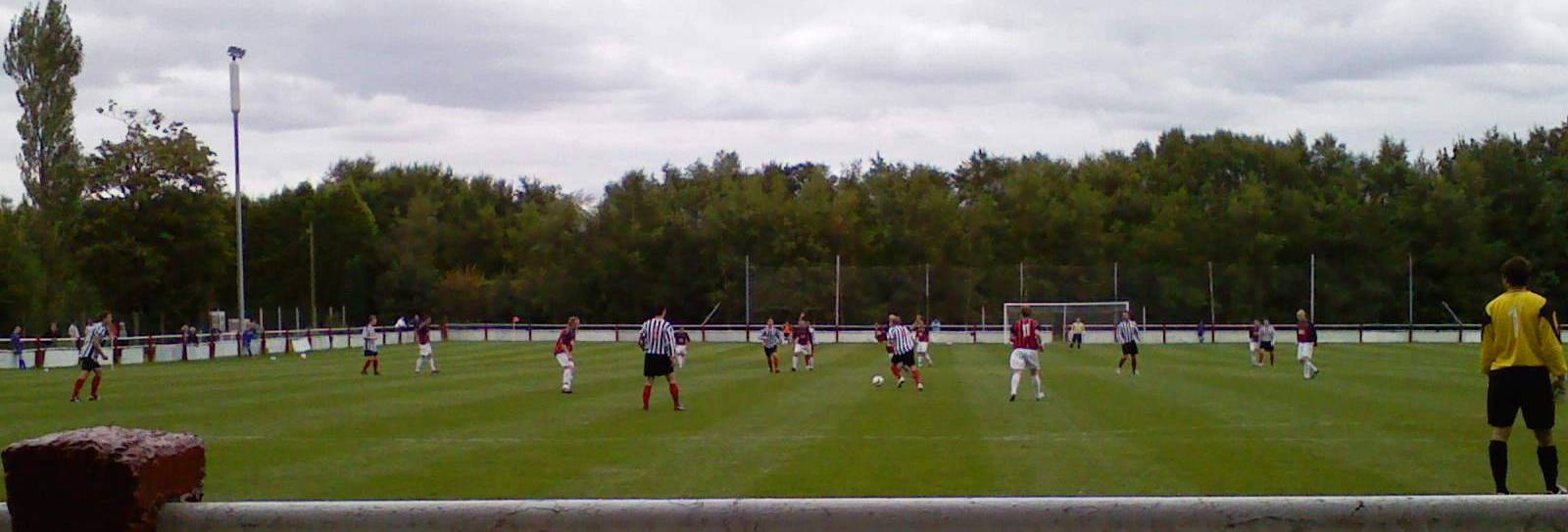
Quorn in action against Pelsall Villa in the 2007–08 FA Cup

Farley Way Stadium boasts a 315-seater cantilever stand running along one side of the pitch and a covered terrace at one end. Car parking is available on the ground and there is also a clubhouse where food and drink are available on match days. Previously, the club had played at Warwick Avenue since 1960 but moved out after selling their ground at that site to the Abbeyfield housing association.

== Rivalries ==
Quorn's main rivals include Shepshed Dynamo and Loughborough Dynamo of the Northern Premier League Midlands Division and Barrow Town, the closest senior club to Quorn geographically.

== Current squad ==
As of 19 August 2026

Note: Flags indicate national team as defined under FIFA eligibility rules; some limited exceptions apply. Players may hold more than one non-FIFA nationality.

No.	Pos.	Nation	Player
—	DF	ENG	Elias Scott Reaney (On loan from Notts County)
—	GK	ENG	Jake Laban (on loan from Harborough Town)
—	GK	ENG	Elliot Smith
—	DF	ESP	Madou Cisse
—	DF	ENG	Luke Cox
—	DF	ENG	Mason Frizelle
—	DF	ENG	Ben Kaninda
—	DF	ENG	Jaiden Owen
—	DF	ENG	Finlay Tunstall

No.	Pos.	Nation	Player
—	MF	ENG	Ryan Beswick
—	MF	GAM	Ethan Bojang
—	MF	ENG	Aiden Edwards
—	MF	ENG	Lindon Meikle
—	FW	ENG	Tim Berridge
—	FW	ENG	Jaiden Campbell-Ryce
—	FW	ENG	Billy Kee
—	FW	ENG	Jayden-Samuel Lawrence-Lowther
—	FW	ENG	Luke Shaw

== Honours ==
League

- NPL Division One Midlands
  - Champions: 2024–25

== Club records ==
- Best league performance: Northern Premier League Division One Midlands, 1st, 2024–25
- Best FA Cup performance: Third Qualifying Round, 2006–07, 2025–26
- Best FA Vase performance: 4th round, 2004–05 and 2006–07
- Best FA Trophy performance: First Round, 2023–24

== Sources ==
- Mike and Tony Williams (2006). Non League Club Directory 2006. Tony Williams Publications Ltd. ISBN 1-869833-54-6.
- Quorn at the Football Club History Database
- Quorn FC on the official village website
