= Nuneaton Griff F.C. =

Association football club in England

Coordinates: 52°30′56.68″N 1°27′51.43″W

Nuneaton Griff
- Full name: Nuneaton Griff Football Club
- Nicknames: The Heartlanders, The Griff
- Founded: 1972 (as Nuneaton Amateurs)
- Ground: The Pingles Stadium; Nuneaton
- Capacity: 4,000
- Chairman: John Gore
- Manager: Vacant
- League: Midland League Division Two
- 2025–26: Midland League Division One, 21st of 21 (relegated)
Home colours	Away colours

Nuneaton Griff F.C. are a football club based in Nuneaton, Warwickshire, England. They joined the Midland Football Combination Premier Division in 1999, they compete in the Midland League Division Two.

Griff have won the Midland Combination Premier Division on two occasions, including a League and cup treble in 2000–2001, earning them the Midland Combination Team of the Year Award, two Coventry Alliance Premier Division titles, one Birmingham Combination Premier Cup in 2000–2001, two Coventry Alliance Premier Cups, five Coventry Telegraph Cups, two Chapel End Nursing Cups, along with the Birmingham County Junior Cup in 1998–1999.

The club play their home games at the Pingles Stadium, which holds up to 6,000 spectators 232 seated. Griff's home kit is blue and white vertical striped shirts, with blue shorts, accompanied by blue socks. This combination has been used since the club formed in 1972.

== History ==
The club was founded in 1972 as Nuneaton Amateurs when a dispute at the well-known local club Co-op Sports F.C. led to many members moving to the Nuneaton Griff and Coton Miners Welfare Ground. Nine players and officials paid £1 each to start the new club and Colin Wetton became the first manager, with Colin Rathbone as chairman.

The Amateurs initially played in the Coventry and North Warwickshire League, and in their first season, were denied a championship success when their opponents failed to turn up for a late-season rescheduled game and the Coventry and North Warwickshire League decided there was not time to fit in another match.

By the 1990s, the club was playing in the Coventry Alliance Football League, where they were dominant for a number of years. In 1998–99, the decision was made to apply for membership of the Midland Football Combination.

The club was controversially placed directly into the Premier Division but the Heartlanders, under manager Mark Green, repaid that faith by winning the championship in their first season 1999–2000 and repeated the feat the following season 2000–01, adding the Endsleigh Challenge Cup for good measure. In the process, they made history by winning the Challenge Cup at Villa Park and the following night, winning the Coventry Telegraph Cup at Highfield Road, Coventry, to become the only club ever to play in two cup finals on consecutive days at two different Premier League football grounds win them both.

In 2014, they were placed into the newly formed Midland Football League Division One. In the 2015–16 season, the club reached the fifth round of the FA Vase for the first time, where they lost 3–0 to Salisbury at home in front of a record crowd of 870.

== Honours ==
- Midland Combination Premier Division
  - Winners: 1999–2000, 2000–01
  - Runners-up: 2010–11
- Midland Combination Challenge Cup
  - Winners: 2000–01
- Midland Combination Glover Rowley Team of the Year
  - Winners: 2000–01
- Coventry Alliance Premier Division
  - Winners: 1996–97, 1997–98
  - Runners-up: 1998–99
- Coventry Alliance Premier Division Cup
  - Winners: 1996–97, 1997–98
- Birmingham County Junior Cup
  - Winners: 1998–99
  - Finalists: 1999–2000
- Birmingham County Saturday Vase
  - Finalists: 2000–01
- Birmingham County Midweek Floodlit Cup
  - Finalists: 2003–04, 2010–11, 2015–16
- Coventry Telegraph Cup
  - Winners: 1972–73, 1996–97, 2000–01, 2001–02, 2008–09
- Coventry Charity Cup
  - Winners: 1998–99, 1999–2000
- Midland Combination Programme of the Year
  - Winners: 2007–08, 2009–10, 2010–11, 2011–12, 2012–13, 2013–14
- Soccer Club Swap Shop
  - MFC Programme of the Season: 2007–08
- Coventry Telegraph Junior Cup
  - Winners: 2008–09, 2014–15
- Foleshill Charity Cup
  - Winners: 1989–90, 1997–98, 1999–2000
- Roy Jones Memorial Cup
  - Winners: 2010–11
- Coventry Alliance Fair Play Award
  - Winners: 2009–10
- Nuneaton Cannon Sports 6-A-Side Champions Cup
  - Winners: 2013

== Records ==
- Best league performance: Midland Combination Premier Division champions, 1999–2000 and 2000–01
- Best FA Cup performance: Second Qualifying Round 2012–13
- Best FA Vase performance: Fifth Round, 2015–16
