= Stafford Town F.C. =

Association football club in England

Coordinates: 52°47′38.26″N 2°07′25.01″W

Stafford Town
- Full name: Stafford Town Football Club
- Nicknames: Reds, Town
- Founded: 1976
- Ground: Evans Park; Riverway; Stafford
- Capacity: 600
- Chairman: Ian Setterfield
- Manager: Adam Wall
- League: North West Counties League Division One South
- 2025–26: North West Counties League Division One South, 5th of 18
Home colours

Stafford Town Football Club is an English football club based in Stafford. The club's senior men's team play in the North West Counties League Division One South. Their nearest rivals are fellow Stafford clubs Stafford Rangers and Brocton.

== History ==
The club was founded in 1976 as Stafford and joined the Midland Combination Division two for the 1977–78 season, winning the league at their second attempt. They changed their name to Stafford Town in 1981 and left the Midlands Combination the following year before entering local football in 1984 when they became a founder member of the Staffordshire Senior League. They remained in that competition until 1993 and for two of those seasons the club was known as Stafford MSHD following the merger with Sunday League team MSHD. They joined the West Midlands Regional League for the 1993–94 season and won Division One in their debut season, earning them promotion to the Premier Division. They were champions of the Premier Division in 1999–2000 and earned promotion to the Midland Football Alliance and in their debut season at that level they reached the 3rd Qualifying Round of the FA Cup, going down 3–1 to Harrow Borough in a replay having achieved a 0–0 draw at Harrow's ground. The club finished bottom in 2003–04 and were relegated back to the West Midlands Regional Alliance Division One, getting back into the Premier Division in 2009–10 as runners-up, losing the title on goal difference.

The team transferred to the Midland Football Combination Premier Division at the beginning of the 2012–13 season, for which the club appointed Adam Cunningham from Stone Old Alleynians as manager after Steve Dockerty had resigned.

Cunningham left the team in May 2016, after winning the Les James Challenge League Cup. Dave Downing was then appointed as manager in the summer of 2016.

Downing departed the club in February 2018 with the club rooted to the bottom of the division. Jake Robinson and Paul Snape took the helm and guided the club to what was believed to be safety in a 20th-place finish. The club fell foul to the restructure of step 6 and 5 and were relegated to the Staffordshire Senior League Premier. During close season Snape departed leaving Robinson working alongside long term club servant Calvin Bailey to rebuild the squad and adapt to a new division. Robinson, assisted by Bailey and Luke Williams then led Stafford to a top 5 finish the following season, and a League Cup win over Leek CSOB, prompting a return to the Midland Football League Division One ahead of the 2019-20 campaign.

Following a disappointing 2019-20 campaign which saw Town rock bottom before the league was abandoned due to the COVID-19 outbreak, Jake Robinson was replaced as manager.

Steve Barrow and Dominic Heath were appointed as joint managers ahead of the 2020–21 season.

The 2020–21 season was again cut short due to the COVID-19 outbreak at the end of 2020. Ahead of the 2021–22 season, the club was moved sideways to the North West Counties League Division One South.

In 2022, many managerial problems came as Steve Barrow and Dominic Heath resigned as managers of the club, after winning 2 games from 10, they left the job as managers after 2 1/2 years at the job. Recently after the departure of Steve Barrow and Dominic stepping down as manager, the appointment of Anthony Malbon was made successful, but only after 27 days of taking charge of Stafford Town, he decided it was wrong place, wrong time and stepped down as manager just shortly after arriving. Stafford Town then appointed Adam Wall as manager of the first team assisted by Bill Bickley.

== Ground ==
The club has moved into its first permanent stadium (having rented other clubs' and municipal grounds up until now) at Riverway, close to the centre of Stafford. The stadium is named after chairman Gordon Evans. The ground was turned into a 3G facility in the summer of 2016, with a joint partnership with the Stafford Borough Council. In the autumn of 2022, two new dugout facilities were put into place, situated opposite the stand. As well as the 550 seats situated at the stadium, there are available standing points located all around the stadium, and food and drink is available to spectators. The club in 2026 were donated a club shop facility from club sponsors MKM as well as a facility for a bar and lounge area.

== Honours ==
- West Midlands (Regional) League Premier Division
  - Champions 1999–2000
- West Midlands (Regional) League Division One
  - Champions 1993–94
  - Runners-up 2009–10
- Midland Combination Division Two
  - Champions 1978–79
- Staffordshire Senior League
  - Runners-up 1991–92
- Les James Challenge Cup
  - Winners – 2013–14
- Staffordshire Senior League Premier Division Cup
  - Winners - 2018–19
- Macron Cup
  - Finalists 2024-25
- Edward Case Trophy
  - Finalists 2024-25

== Records ==
- FA Cup
  - Third Qualifying Round 2000–01
- FA Vase
  - Second Round 2011–12
