= Cadbury Athletic F.C. =

Association football club in England

Coordinates: 52.427497°N 1.933958°W

Cadbury Athletic
- Full name: Cadbury Athletic Football Club
- Nickname: The Chocolate Men
- Founded: 1994
- Ground: Cadbury Recreation Ground, Bournville
- Chairman: Bryan Elliott
- Manager: Dean Guest
- League: Midland League Division Two
- 2025–26: Midland League Division Two, 2nd of 15
- Website: cadburyathleticfc.co.uk
Home colours	Away colours

Cadbury Athletic Football Club is an amateur football club based in Birmingham, England. Affiliated with the Cadbury confectionery company and playing in the company colours of purple and white, they are currently members of the Midland League Division Two and play at the Cadbury Recreation Ground in Bournville.

== History ==
The club was established in 1994, and were admitted to Division Three of the Midland Combination. Despite finishing ninth in their first season, they were promoted to Division Two. In 2000–01 a fourth-place finish was enough to secure promotion to Division One, with the club also winning the league's Challenge Vase. They were Division One runners-up in 2004–05, earning promotion to the Premier Division.

Despite finishing twelfth in the Premier Division in 2011–12, Cadbury Athletic resigned from the division and dropped into Division One. They were Division One champions in 2013–14, the last season before the league merged with the Midland Alliance to form the Midland League, with Cadbury Athletic placed in Division One. The club resigned from Division One at the end of the 2020–21 season and dropped into Division Two. The following season saw them win the Division Two title and the Birmingham Saturday Vase with a 4–0 victory over Tipton Town in the final.

== Ground ==
The club originally played at the Cadbury Recreation Ground at the Cadbury factory in Bournville. Due to the lack of floodlights, the first team moved to Pilkington XXX's Triplex Sports Ground in Kings Norton, and then Alvechurch's Lye Meadow ground, before returning to the Triplex Ground.

The Triplex Ground was originally developed by Richmond Swifts. Levelling work between 1956 and 1958 led to banking being created on three sides of the pitch, with the fourth side left open for use as a cricket oval. A stand was built on the railway side of the pitch the mid-1990s, but Richmond left the ground after being unable to obtain planning permission to install floodlights. The ground was later taken over by Pilkington XXX, who were able to install floodlights.

After dropping into Division Two of the Midland League in 2021, the club returned to the Cadbury Recreation Ground.

== Players ==
Several former youth players at Cadbury Athletic have gone on to play professional football, including Rico Henry, Ryan Burge, Demarai Gray, Corey O'Keeffe and Daniel Sturridge.

== Honours ==
- Midland League
  - Division Two champions 2021–22
- Midland Combination
  - Division One champions 2013–14
  - Challenge Vase winners 2000–01
- Birmingham Saturday Vase
  - Winners 2021–22

== Records ==
- Best FA Cup performance: Preliminary round, 2015–16
- Best FA Vase performance: Fourth round, 2018–19
