= Littleton F.C. =

Association football club in England

Coordinates: 52.12225°N 1.86293°W

Littleton
- Full name: Littleton Football Club
- Nickname: The Ton
- Founded: 1890
- Ground: Five Acres, North and Middle Littleton
- Chairman: Mark Wilcox
- Manager: Steven Edghill
- League: Herefordshire League Premier Division
- 2025–26: Herefordshire League Premier Division, 3rd of 14
Home colours

Littleton Football Club Pitch

Littleton Football Club is a football club based in North and Middle Littleton, near Evesham, Worcestershire. They are members of the Herefordshire League Premier Division.

== History ==
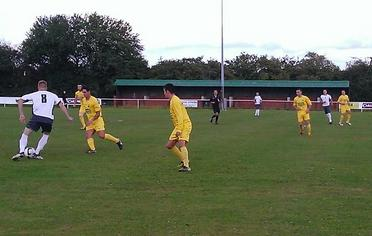
Littleton (in white) playing Bolehall Swifts in 2013

Littleton Football Club was formed in 1890. The joined the Midland Football Combination Division Three in 1979 but only spent three seasons in the division before leaving. Littleton rejoined in 2001–02 and won the league in their first season back, gaining promotion to Division Two. The following season they were promoted again, to Division One, after finishing runners-up. In 2011–12, Littleton finished runners-up in Division One and gained promotion to the Premier Division for 2012–13, their first season at level 10 of the English football league system.

The 2019–20 season saw Littleton moved into the West Midlands (Regional) League Premier Division under the guidance of new management duo Tyrone Henderson and Oliver Hartill who saved the club from relegation in the 2018–19 season. At the end of the 2020–21 season, the club were transferred to Division One of the Hellenic League.

== Ground ==
Littleton play at Five Acres in North and Middle Littleton.

== Honours ==
- Midland Football Combination Division Three
  - Champions: 2001–02
- Midland Football Combination Division One
  - Runners-up: 2011–12
- Midland Football Combination Division Two
  - Runners-up: 2002–03

== Records ==
- FA Vase
  - Second Qualifying Round 2015–16
