= Racing Club Warwick F.C. =

Association football club in Warwick, England

Coordinates: 52°16′32″N 1°36′06″W

Racing Club Warwick
- Full name: Racing Club Warwick Football Club
- Nickname: The Racers
- Founded: 1919
- Ground: Townsend Meadow, Warwick
- Capacity: 1,800 (450 seated)
- Chairman: Gary Vella
- Manager: Jack Edwards and Chris Knott
- League: Southern League Premier Division Central
- 2025–26: Northern Premier League Division One Midlands, 5th of 22 (promoted via play-offs)
Home colours	Away colours

Racing Club Warwick Football Club is a football club based in Warwick, Warwickshire, and competes in the Southern League Premier Division Central.

== History ==
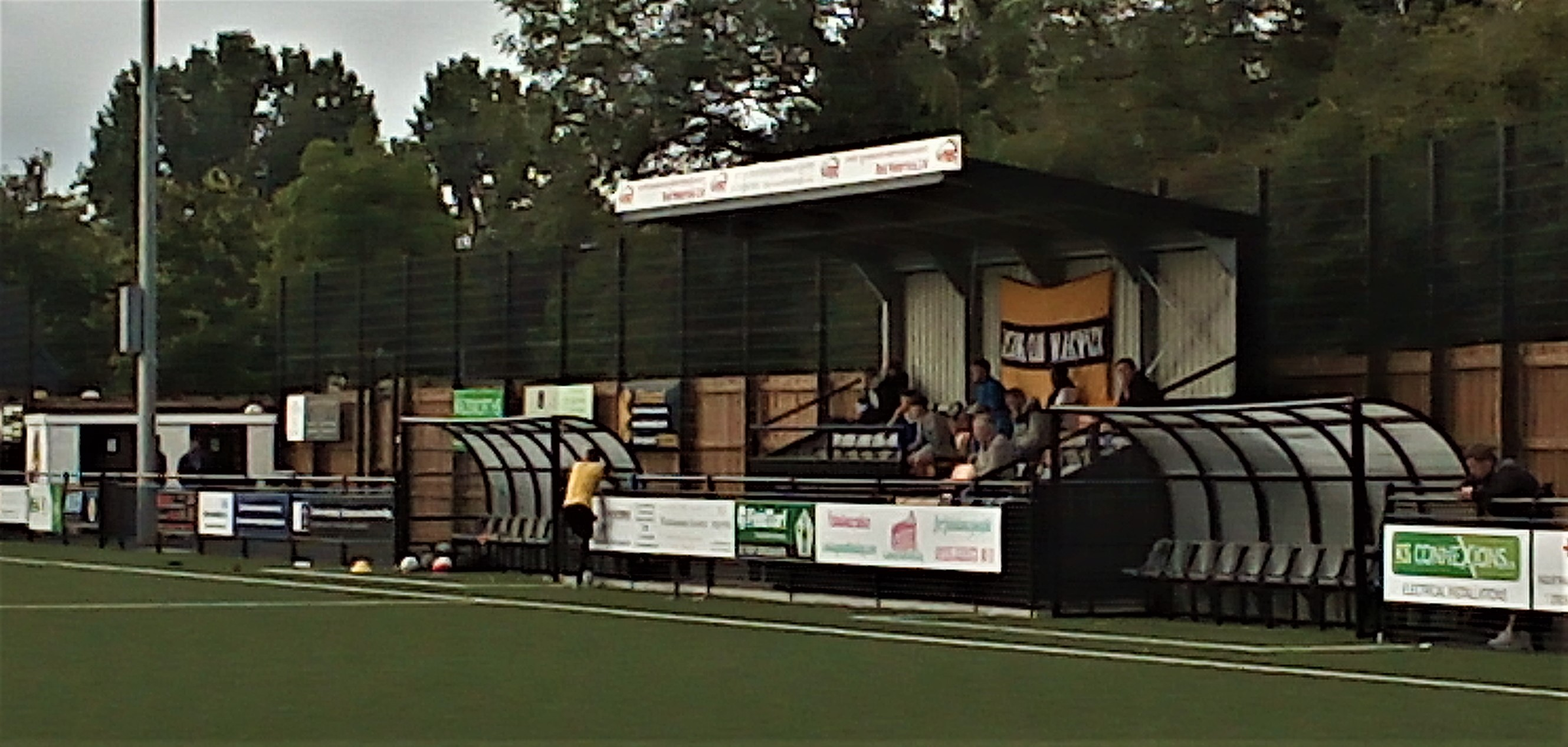
One of the seated stands at Townsend Meadow in 2021

They were formed in 1919 under the name of Saltisford Rovers and played in various local leagues including the Warwick League, Leamington & District League and the Warwickshire Combination until 1967. During this period the club won a number of honours, including the Birmingham Alliance Senior Cup when they defeated Birmingham City in the final at St. Andrews. In 1967 the club joined the West Midlands (Regional) League. Three years later they changed to their current name (which came from the fact that their ground is by Warwick Racecourse) and soon afterwards switched to the Midland Football Combination, where they were champions in 1988 and runners-up in 1989. After the latter honour they gained promotion to the Southern League where they remained until 2003 when they finished bottom of the Western Division and dropped into the Midland Football Alliance. They remained in the Midland Football Alliance until the end of the 2008–09 season, when they were relegated to the Midland Football Combination Premier Division, now the Midland Football League Division One. At the start of the 2016–17 season the club began huge infrastructure renovations following the arrival of local businessman Chairman Gary Vella and the new committee members the previous year, including new changing rooms, floodlighting, stands and artificial training area. The club's record win is 15–0 recorded on 26 December 2016. They gained their first promotion for 30 years in 2018-19 as runners-up in the Midland Football League Division One. The club installed a 3g pitch in the winter of 2020 in order to expand their community activity and provide a broad spectrum of football to include women's and disability amongst other community groups. Claverdon play their home fixtures at Townsend Meadow.

Racing Club Warwick made it to the final of the 2023-24 Birmingham Senior Cup before losing 9-0 against Aston Villa U21.

== Youth set-up and football academy ==
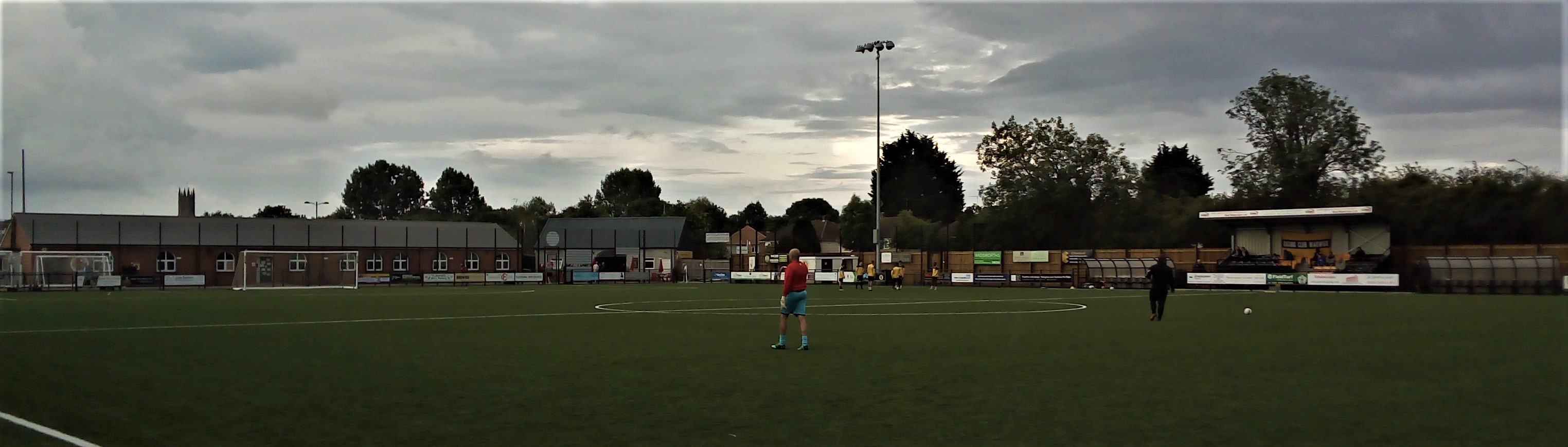
A panorama of the club grounds from 2021

As of the 2026–27 season the club has a youth team in the Midland Floodlight Youth League Premier after winning the Central Division in 25-26, teams from U-8 to U-16 and an academy nursery section, Mini Racers, for children aged 4 to 7. The junior teams are entered into the Coventry Minor League, MJPL and the Mid Warwickshire league. The club has a partnership with Leamington Lions Girls and Ladies. The club also have an academy and education programme in partnership with HOET.

== Backroom staff and club officials ==
Name	Position
Gary Vella	Chairman
Ryan Goode	Vice-chairman
Phil Salter	Treasurer
Ryan Goode	Football Secretary
Kevin Walsh	Club Secretary
Ryan Goode	Board Member Junior Secretary
Ian Ray	Welfare Officer
Georgina McCarthy	Foundation Phase Welfare Officer
Ruth Vella	Board Member
Jack Edwards/Chris Knott	First Team Managers
Lewis Marston	First team Coach
Chris Cook	1st Team/Academy GK Coach
TBC	First Team Kitman
Anna Poole	Physio
Josh Vella	Academy Media
Rob Harris	Groundsman
Dylan Parker	U18 Head Coach
Harry Budd	Academy Coach
Matt Nutt	Academy Manager

=== Current squad ===
Note: Flags indicate national team as defined under FIFA eligibility rules; some limited exceptions apply. Players may hold more than one non-FIFA nationality.

No.	Pos.	Nation	Player
1	GK	ENG	Tom Allsopp
2	DF	ENG	Ryan Moore
3	DF	ENG	Kyle Barnett
4	MF	ENG	James Hancocks
5	DF	ENG	Nile Timson
6	DF	ENG	Archie Hamp
8	MF	ENG	Cam Ebbutt
9	MF	ENG	Jack Edwards
10	MF	ENG	Ethan Hill
12	MF	ENG	Connor Taylor

No.	Pos.	Nation	Player
10	FW	GHA	Aaron Opoku
15	FW	ENG	Josh Flynn
16	MF	ENG	Charlie Pye
17	MF	ENG	Callum Coyle
18	MF	POR	Miro Pais
19	MF	ENG	Jude Collins
20	FW	ENG	Rhys Hilton
21	MF	ENG	Jaden Baker
22	MF	ENG	Adam Walker

== Honours ==
- Warwick League Champions 1933–36 inclusive
- Warwick Cinderella Cup winners 1935–39 inclusive, 1946–47
- T.G John Cup winners 1936–37
- Leamington & District Champions 1937–38 and 1945–48 inclusive
- Birmingham & West Midlands Alliance champions 1948–49
- Leamington Hospital Cup winners 1938–39, 1946–47
- Leamington Junior Cup winners 1938–39, 1946–47
- Birmingham & District Alliance Senior Cup winners 1949–50
- Midland Combination Premier Division champions 1987–88
- Midland Alliance League Cup winners 2004–05
- Midland Floodlit Youth League southern champions 2013–14
- United Counties League Premier Division South playoff champions 2023–24

== Club records ==
- Best league performance: Southern League Midland Division, 10th, 1994–95
- Best FA Cup performance: 3rd qualifying round, 1987–88
- Best FA Trophy performance: 2nd round, 1998–99
- Best FA Vase performance: 4th round, 1977–78
- Best Birmingham Senior Cup performance: Runners-up, 2023–24
- Biggest league win: 15–0 v Southam United, 26 December 2016
- Most league goals scored in a season: 119, 2018–19
- Record goalscorer in a season: Ben Mackey, 37 goals, 2018–19
- Most clean sheets in a season: O. Gibson, 18 clean sheets, 1981-82

== Sources ==
- Racing Club Warwick at the Football Club History Database
- Mike and Tony Williams (2006). Non League Club Directory 2006. Tony Williams Publications Ltd. ISBN 1-869833-54-6.
