= Chris Cornes =

English footballer

Personal information
- Full name: Christopher Richard Cornes
- Date of birth: 20 December 1986 (age 39)
- Place of birth: Worcester, England
- Height: 5 ft 11 in (1.80 m)
- Position: Forward

Team information
- Current team: Worcester City (manager)

Youth career
- Wolverhampton Wanderers

Senior career*
Years	Team	Apps	(Gls)
2004–2006	Wolverhampton Wanderers	0	(0)
2005	→ Port Vale (loan)	10	(4)
2006–2007	Worcester City		
2007	→ Telford United (loan)		
2007–2008	Telford United		
2008	Bromsgrove Rovers	17	(0)
2008–2009	Stourport Swifts		
2009	Worcester City		
2009	→ Evesham United (loan)		
2009–2010	Stourport Swifts		
2010	Redditch United	3	(0)
2010–201?	Malvern Town		
201?–201?	Littleton		

Managerial career
- 2018–2021: Worcester Raiders (co-manager)
- 2022: Bewdley Town
- 2022–: Worcester City
- * Club domestic league appearances and goals

Christopher Richard Cornes (born 20 December 1986) is an English football manager and former player who is the manager of Southern League Premier Division Central club Worcester City.

Cornes played as a forward. A former Wolverhampton Wanderers trainee, he enjoyed a successful loan spell to Port Vale in 2005, having signed a professional contract at Wolves the previous year. He tested positive for cocaine in February 2006 and received a six-month ban from the game before his contract was cancelled in September of that year. He then joined Worcester City before moving on to Telford United the following year. In 2008, he joined Stourport Swifts via Bromsgrove Rovers. The next year, he was back at Worcester and Stourport Swifts, also playing on loan for Evesham United before signing with Malvern Town via Redditch United in summer 2010. He was imprisoned on drug dealing charges in 2015.

He co-managed Worcester Raiders to the West Midlands (Regional) League Division One title at the end of the 2018–19 season. He left the club in October 2021 and was appointed Bewdley Town manager in January 2022 before taking charge of Worcester City ten months later. He led the club to successive promotions, winning the Hellenic League Premier Division title in 2023–24 and then the Northern Premier League Division One Midlands play-offs in 2025, as well as two Worcestershire Senior Cup titles.

== Playing career ==
=== Wolverhampton Wanderers ===
Cornes attended Pershore High School, before beginning his career as a trainee with Championship club Wolverhampton Wanderers, turning professional in July 2004. He joined League One side Port Vale on loan in August 2005, making his debut on 28 August in Vale's goalless draw at Milton Keynes Dons – picking up the man of the match award in the process. He scored both goals against Oldham Athletic on 28 September, and followed this by getting goals against Walsall and Swindon Town, leaving him with a streak of four goals in three games. He returned to Molineux at the end of November, having scored four times in eleven first team appearances for the "Valiants".

In February 2006, Cornes tested positive for cocaine and was given a six-month ban. Initially Wolves stood by him and allowed him to continue training. However, in September 2006, his contract was cancelled by mutual consent.

"Chris is grateful for the club for supporting him and regrets the embarrassment he has caused."

— Chief executive Jez Moxey explains Cornes' situation in July 2006.

=== Non-League ===
At the end of his ban in October 2006, he joined Conference North side Worcester City, and two months later signed until the end of the season. However, he fell out of favour and joined Northern Premier League Premier Division side AFC Telford United on loan in March 2007, helping Telford to promotion to the Conference North via the play-offs. He turned down interest from several league clubs to sign a one-year contract with Telford in May 2007.

He terminated his contract with Telford in January 2008, with the club and Cornes coming towards the end of a club disciplinary process. He joined Bromsgrove Rovers in the Southern League Premier Division later that month. The club were relegated at the end of the 2007–08 campaign, and Cornes decided to leave when new manager Rod Brown took charge in October 2008. Later that month he joined Stourport Swifts in the Southern League Division One Central, along with his former Bromsgrove manager Duane Darby.

In July 2009, he was released by the Swifts, his fitness an issue. He promptly returned to old club Worcester City for pre-season training. Worcester loaned him out to Evesham United in August 2009, before he re-signed with Stourport six weeks into his loan spell.

In June 2010, he joined Conference North side Redditch United. Two months later he switched clubs to Midland Football Alliance club Malvern Town. At the end of the 2010–11 campaign Malvern were relegated to the West Midlands (Regional) League. He later played for Littleton in the Midland Combination.

=== Style of play ===
Stourport manager Neil Hunt described him as "a playmaker, he doesn't track back or run around but his quality on the ball is undeniable."

== Management career ==
Cornes, alongside Karl Gormley, co-managed Worcester Raiders to promotion as champions of the West Midlands (Regional) League Division One in the 2018–19 season. The 2019–20 and 2020–21 seasons were abandoned due to the COVID-19 pandemic in England. He left the club seven games into the 2021–22 campaign, with club captain Danny Flowers suggesting on Twitter that he was "pushed out by the chairman".

On 12 January 2022, Cornes was announced as the new manager of Midland League Premier Division club Bewdley Town, who were then bottom of the table. Bewdley finished second-from-bottom at the end of the 2021–22 season, but were reprieved from relegation.

On 12 November 2022, Cornes was installed as manager at Worcester City, also of the Midland League Premier Division. City ended the 2022–23 season in 17th place. Worcester were switched to the Hellenic League Premier Division for the 2023–24 campaign and went on to win promotion as league champions. Cornes retained his key players and also signed Charlie Wise, Zac Guinan, Levi Steele, Nathan Hayward and Hayden Reeves. His team secured a second successive promotion as they won the Northern Premier League Division One Midlands play-offs, beating Corby Town in the final. He signed a two-year contract extension in June 2025. He hoped for a third consecutive promotion. However, he lost defender Hayden Reeves to league rivals Stourbridge. His team won a second consecutive Worcestershire Senior Cup title.

== Legal troubles ==
Cornes was arrested in May 2015 for possession of class A drugs with intent to supply and money laundering after £40,000 of high-purity cocaine and "a substantial amount of cash" was found in the back of a car in Worcester. He pleaded guilty and was sentenced to four years and four months in prison.

== Career statistics ==
Appearances and goals by club, season and competition
Club	Season	League			FA Cup		Other		Total	
Club	Season	Division	Apps	Goals	Apps	Goals	Apps	Goals	Apps	Goals
Wolverhampton Wanderers	2004–05	Championship	0	0	0	0	0	0	0	0
Port Vale (loan)	2005–06	League One	10	4	0	0	1	0	11	4
Bromsgrove Rovers	2007–08	Southern League Premier Division	13	1	0	0	1	0	14	1
Bromsgrove Rovers	2007–08	Southern League Division One Midlands	4	0	0	0	0	0	4	0
Bromsgrove Rovers	Total		17	1	0	0	1	0	18	1
Redditch United	2010–11	Conference North	3	0	0	0	0	0	3	0

== Honours ==
=== Playing ===
Telford United

- Northern Premier League Premier Division play-offs: 2007

=== Managerial ===
Worcester Raiders (co-manager)

- West Midlands (Regional) League Division One: 2018–19

Worcester City

- Hellenic League Premier Division: 2023–24
- Northern Premier League Division One Midlands play-offs: 2025
- Worcestershire Senior Cup: 2025, 2026
