= 2021–22 Midland Football League =

The 2021–22 Midland Football League season was the eighth in the history of the Midland Football League, a football competition in England. The Midland League operates two divisions in the English football league system, the Premier Division at Step 5, and Division One at Step 6, and these two divisions are covered by this article.

The allocations for Steps 5 and 6 for this season were announced by The Football Association on 18 May 2021, and were subject to appeal.

After the abandonment of the 2019–20 and 2020–21 seasons due to the COVID-19 pandemic in England, numerous promotions were decided on a points per game basis over the previous two seasons.

== Premier Division ==
Midland Football League Premier Division
- Season: 2021–22
- Champions: Hanley Town (1st title)
- Promoted: Hanley Town; Boldmere St Michaels
- Relegated: Haughmond
- Matches: 342
- Goals: 1,122 (3.28 per match)
- Biggest home win: Lichfield City 9–0 Uttoxeter Town (13 November 2021)
- Biggest away win: Wolverhampton Casuals 1–7 Lye Town (30 October 2021); Bewdley Town 0–6 Stourport Swifts (27 December 2021); Wolverhampton Casuals 1–7 Hanley Town (18 January 2022)
- Highest scoring: Bewdley Town 3–8 Shifnal Town (9 November 2021)

The Premier Division featured 11 clubs which competed in the previous season, along with eight new clubs.

- Clubs promoted from Division One:
  - Lichfield City
  - Uttoxeter Town
- Clubs promoted from the West Midlands (Regional) League Premier Division:
  - Bewdley Town
  - Shifnal Town
  - Wolverhampton Casuals
- Clubs transferred from the North West Counties League Premier Division:
  - Hanley Town
  - Whitchurch Alport
- Plus:
  - Stone Old Alleynians, promoted from North West Counties League Division One South

Congleton Town's initial transfer to this division from the North West Counties League was reversed on appeal.

=== League table ===
Pos	Team	Pld	W	D	L	GF	GA	GD	Pts	Promotion, qualification or relegation
1	Hanley Town	36	25	8	3	82	26	+56	83	Promoted to the Northern Premier League
2	Boldmere St. Michaels	36	22	8	6	71	35	+36	74	Qualified for the inter-step play-off, then promoted to the Northern Premier League (Note: Contested an inter-step play-off match as one of bottom six runners-up from Step 5 with the most points per game (PPG) at the end of the 2021–22 season against one of the seven third-from-bottom clubs with the fewest PPG from the eight divisions at Step 4. The winner rose to Step 4 for the 2022–23 season, while the loser dropped to Step 5.)
3	Lichfield City	36	20	8	8	82	42	+40	68	
4	Worcester City	36	20	5	11	70	37	+33	65	
5	AFC Wulfrunians	36	17	9	10	57	48	+9	60	
6	Walsall Wood	36	15	12	9	69	43	+26	57	
7	Shifnal Town	36	16	8	12	69	45	+24	56	
8	Lye Town	36	16	7	13	58	38	+20	55	
9	Romulus	36	16	6	14	59	57	+2	54	
10	Stone Old Alleynians	36	14	10	12	59	63	−4	52	
11	Tividale	36	14	9	13	50	55	−5	51	
12	Whitchurch Alport	36	15	3	18	64	73	−9	48	
13	Stourport Swifts	36	11	13	12	58	57	+1	46	
14	Racing Club Warwick	36	12	6	18	51	61	−10	42	
15	Highgate United	36	6	12	18	44	65	−21	30	
16	Uttoxeter Town	36	7	9	20	38	76	−38	30	
17	Wolverhampton Casuals	36	9	4	23	46	101	−55	30 (Note: Wolverhampton Casuals were deducted 1 point for fielding an ineligible player.)	
18	Bewdley Town	36	6	8	22	42	110	−68	26	Reprieved from relegation (Note: Reprieved as one of twelve clubs with the most PPG out of 16 that were second-from-bottom at Step 5.)
19	Haughmond	36	6	5	25	53	90	−37	23	Relegated to Division One

Source: The FA Full-Time
Rules for classification: 1) points; 2) goal difference; 3) number of goals scored; 4) number of matches won; 5) head-to-head results

=== Inter-step play-off ===
30 April 2022	Chalfont St Peter	0–4	Boldmere St Michaels	Chalfont St Peter
15:00 BST			Daley 29'; Byrne 33', 70'; McSkeane 63'	Stadium: Mill Meadow; Attendance: 313

=== Results table ===
Home \ Away	WUL	BEW	BSM	HAN	HAU	HIG	LIC	LYE	RCW	ROM	SHI	SOA	STO	TIV	UTT	WAL	WHI	WVC	WOR
AFC Wulfrunians	—	0–0	1–1	3–1	3–0	2–0	2–1	2–1	3–3	0–2	2–0	2–0	2–1	2–2	0–0	1–2	2–0	5–2	3–1
Bewdley Town	0–5	—	0–3	2–1	5–5	1–0	2–5	0–2	0–0	1–1	3–8	1–2	0–6	1–2	2–1	1–1	1–4	3–0	0–3
Boldmere St Michaels	1–0	6–1	—	1–2	3–1	1–1	3–2	2–2	2–1	1–1	2–0	3–0	2–1	3–1	3–0	1–0	4–0	3–1	0–2
Hanley Town	1–1	6–0	2–1	—	4–2	3–0	2–2	1–1	4–0	2–0	3–1	2–1	4–0	0–0	1–0	1–1	2–0	6–1	1–0
Haughmond	4–1	0–1	0–2	1–5	—	1–1	0–3	2–1	1–1	4–1	0–1	0–3	1–3	1–2	1–0	2–4	3–4	3–0	0–1
Highgate United	1–1	2–2	2–4	2–2	2–1	—	0–0	2–3	2–0	5–3	2–1	3–4	3–1	0–1	0–0	1–1	0–2	2–2	1–2
Lichfield City	3–0	3–0	1–1	0–1	3–2	4–0	—	2–0	4–1	3–0	1–2	3–2	1–4	4–0	9–0	4–2	1–4	3–0	2–0
Lye Town	1–0	3–1	2–0	0–1	5–1	2–0	0–0	—	2–1	3–0	0–0	1–3	1–1	0–1	0–2	2–0	3–1	3–0	2–0
Racing Club Warwick	4–0	0–4	2–4	1–2	3–2	2–1	4–0	1–0	—	0–1	2–3	3–3	0–1	1–0	6–3	0–3	1–5	3–0	0–1
Romulus	0–2	6–1	0–3	2–2	1–1	2–1	1–4	3–1	2–0	—	2–1	5–1	0–0	1–0	6–0	1–1	3–1	3–0	0–2
Shifnal Town	7–0	5–0	1–2	1–0	4–2	0–0	1–1	2–1	0–2	2–3	—	0–2	1–0	3–0	4–0	2–1	3–1	6–1	2–0
Stone Old Alleynians	0–2	1–1	0–0	0–1	2–1	1–0	1–2	3–2	1–0	1–2	2–2	—	3–3	4–1	2–1	3–3	3–2	1–1	1–0
Stourport Swifts	2–1	3–3	1–1	0–3	4–1	0–3	0–1	1–0	0–0	2–1	2–2	1–1	—	4–2	1–3	0–0	2–0	5–0	1–1
Tividale	1–3	4–0	2–1	0–0	1–0	2–2	2–3	2–2	0–2	2–0	1–0	1–0	1–1	—	3–0	0–2	3–3	5–1	0–0
Uttoxeter Town	0–1	3–0	0–2	0–1	3–3	3–2	1–1	0–0	2–0	1–2	1–1	2–2	2–2	2–2	—	0–3	3–0	1–2	0–1
Walsall Wood	1–1	6–1	3–0	1–2	4–3	6–0	0–0	0–1	2–2	2–0	0–0	1–2	2–2	2–0	2–1	—	1–2	4–0	1–1
Whitchurch Alport	2–0	3–1	1–1	0–5	2–1	3–2	1–4	2–1	1–2	0–2	2–0	3–3	2–1	2–3	4–0	1–2	—	3–1	1–2
Wolverhampton Casuals	0–1	4–3	1–2	1–7	1–3	1–0	1–1	1–7	0–2	2–1	2–2	4–0	5–1	4–1	2–3	2–1	3–2	—	0–1
Worcester City	3–3	6–0	0–2	0–1	6–0	1–1	2–1	0–3	2–1	5–1	2–1	4–1	4–1	1–2	5–0	3–4	4–0	4–0	—

Source: Midland League
Legend: Blue = home team win; Yellow = draw; Red = away team win.
For upcoming matches, an "a" indicates there is an article about the rivalry between the two participants.

=== Stadia and locations ===
Location of the clubs in the 2021–22 Midland League Premier Division

Club	Location	Stadium	Capacity
AFC Wulfrunians	Wolverhampton	Castlecroft Stadium	2,000
Bewdley Town	Bewdley	Ribbesford Meadows	1,000
Boldmere St. Michaels	Boldmere	Trevor Brown Memorial Ground	2,000
Hanley Town	Hanley	Potteries Park	
Haughmond	Shrewsbury	Shrewsbury Sports Village	1,000
Highgate United	Shirley	The Coppice	2,000
Lichfield City	Lichfield	City Ground	1,000
Lye Town	Lye	The Sports Ground	1,000
Racing Club Warwick	Warwick	Townsend Meadow	1,280
Romulus	Birmingham (Castle Vale)	Castle Vale Stadium	2,000
Shifnal Town	Shifnal	Phoenix Park	
Stone Old Alleynians	Stone	Yarnfield Lane	
Stourport Swifts	Stourport-on-Severn	Walshes Meadow	2,000
Tividale	Tividale	The Beeches	2,000
Uttoxeter Town	Uttoxeter	Oldfields	
Walsall Wood	Walsall Wood	Oak Park	1,000
Whitchurch Alport	Whitchurch	Yockings Park	
Wolverhampton Casuals	Featherstone	Brinsford Lane	
Worcester City	Worcester	Claines Lane	1,000

== Division One ==
Midland Football League Division One
- Season: 2021–22
- Champions: Atherstone Town
- Promoted: Atherstone Town; Darlaston Town (1874)
- Relegated: Dudley Sports
- Matches: 342
- Goals: 1,196 (3.5 per match)

Division One featured eight clubs which competed in the previous season, along with eleven new clubs, from the West Midlands (Regional) League:

- AFC Bridgnorth
- Bilston Town
- Cradley Town
- Darlaston Town
- Dudley Sports
- Dudley Town
- OJM Black Country Rangers
- Shawbury United
- Smethwick Khalsa Football Federation, formerly Smethwick Rangers
- Wednesfield
- Wolverhampton Sporting Community

=== League table ===
Pos	Team	Pld	W	D	L	GF	GA	GD	Pts	Promotion, qualification or relegation
1	Atherstone Town	36	30	5	1	93	26	+67	95	Promoted to the Premier Division
2	Darlaston Town (1874)	36	23	9	4	98	27	+71	78	Qualified for the play-offs, then promoted to the Premier Division
3	Stapenhill	36	24	6	6	97	43	+54	78	Qualified for the play-offs
4	Ashby Ivanhoe	36	23	5	8	99	58	+41	74	Qualified for the play-offs
5	Dudley Town	36	22	6	8	76	38	+38	72	Qualified for the play-offs
6	OJM Black Country Rangers	36	18	10	8	90	58	+32	58 (Note: Black Country Rangers were deducted 3 points for fielding an ineligible player and an additional 3 points for failing to fulfil a fixture on 30 April 2022.)	
7	Bilston Town	36	17	4	15	75	67	+8	55	
8	Nuneaton Griff	36	16	5	15	51	64	−13	53	
9	Wolverhampton Sporting	36	18	3	15	63	58	+5	51 (Note: Wolverhampton Sporting were deducted 6 points for failing to fulfil a fixture on 4 October 2021 and for fielding an ineligible player. They were awarded a home win after Black Country failed to raise a team.)	
10	Heath Hayes	36	15	6	15	58	55	+3	51	
11	Wednesfield	36	12	9	15	44	53	−9	45	
12	Paget Rangers	36	12	5	19	49	71	−22	41	
13	Khalsa Football Federation	36	11	5	20	48	83	−35	35 (Note: Khalsa Football Federation were deducted 3 points for failing to fulfil a fixture on 5 November.)	
14	AFC Bridgnorth	36	9	8	19	39	84	−45	35	
15	Cradley Town	36	10	4	22	41	82	−41	34	
16	Chelmsley Town	36	8	9	19	42	57	−15	33	
17	Coventry Copsewood	36	9	5	22	57	83	−26	32	Reprieved from relegation (Note: All third-from-bottom clubs at Step 6 were reprieved from relegation. Fifteen second-from-bottom sides were also reprieved on a PPG basis.)
18	Shawbury United	36	7	4	25	44	80	−36	25	Reprieved from relegation
19	Dudley Sports	36	2	4	30	32	109	−77	10	Relegated to the West Midlands (Regional) League

Source: The FA Full-Time
Rules for classification: 1) points; 2) goal difference; 3) number of goals scored; 4) number of matches won; 5) head-to-head results

=== Play-offs ===
Semifinals
2	Darlaston Town (1874)	4
5	Dudley Town	0
3	Stapenhill	4
4	Ashby Ivanhoe	2

Final
2	Darlaston Town (1874)	2
3	Stapenhill	1

==== Semifinals ====
3 May 2022	Darlaston Town (1874)	4–0	Dudley Town	Darlaston
19:45 GMT	Nicol 23', 34'; Turton 55'; Purewal 90+6'	Report		Stadium: Bentley Sports Pavilion; Attendance: 786

3 May 2022	Stapenhill	4–2	Ashby Ivanhoe	Stapenhill
		Report		Stadium: Edge Hill; Attendance: 419

==== Final ====
7 May 2022	Darlaston Town (1874)	2–1	Stapenhill	Darlaston
15:00	Pearson 68'; Miller 90+6'	Report	Teeney 86'	Stadium: Bentley Sports Pavilion; Attendance: 501

=== Results table ===
Home \ Away	BRI	ASH	ATH	BIL	BCR	CHE	CVC	CRA	DAR	DLS	DLT	HEA	KFF	NUN	PAG	SHA	STA	WED	WSC
AFC Bridgnorth	—	2–2	2–2	2–2	0–5	0–2	1–5	5–0	2–2	0–2	0–3	1–2	2–1	0–1	1–0	0–2	1–1	1–1	1–4
Ashby Ivanhoe	4–0	—	1–1	4–3	2–4	2–1	2–1	3–2	0–2	1–0	3–1	4–3	8–1	7–0	4–1	2–0	1–2	3–0	3–1
Atherstone Town	3–0	1–1	—	3–1	4–1	4–1	2–0	3–0	1–1	2–1	0–0	4–0	2–0	4–1	4–1	6–2	3–1	4–0	1–0
Bilston Town	0–1	1–2	1–5	—	4–2	0–0	4–3	2–3	1–0	6–0	3–0	1–3	3–0	0–1	2–0	3–2	1–3	1–4	1–2
OJM Black Country Rangers	4–1	5–2	2–3	3–3	—	0–1	1–1	5–1	4–4	4–1	1–0	3–0	2–0	4–1	3–1	3–0	2–2	2–3	3–1
Chelmsley Town	0–1	2–2	0–3	0–1	3–2	—	5–2	3–1	1–2	1–1	0–1	1–1	0–1	5–0	2–2	1–3	1–3	0–1	2–3
Coventry Copsewood	2–0	1–7	1–3	1–2	2–3	1–0	—	2–3	0–3	4–1	2–2	1–2	2–3	0–2	2–1	2–4	0–6	3–0	2–2
Cradley Town	0–1	2–3	1–3	1–2	1–3	0–0	2–3	—	0–0	2–1	2–0	1–4	1–3	0–4	3–2	1–0	1–5	0–0	2–3
Darlaston Town (1874)	7–1	0–1	0–2	6–1	1–1	4–0	3–1	5–1	—	7–0	0–0	3–0	7–0	5–0	4–0	2–1	4–0	1–0	5–0
Dudley Sports	0–2	1–6	1–2	1–4	2–2	1–1	1–2	1–1	0–5	—	2–5	0–2	0–3	2–3	1–3	3–1	0–5	0–1	0–4
Dudley Town	8–0	4–0	0–1	1–3	2–2	3–0	3–2	4–0	2–0	6–1	—	0–3	2–1	2–1	3–1	2–1	0–2	2–1	2–0
Heath Hayes	1–2	4–3	0–1	0–5	2–3	0–1	0–0	4–1	1–1	2–0	0–1	—	4–1	0–1	0–2	5–1	2–4	1–1	3–0
Khalsa Football Federation	2–1	1–4	1–3	0–4	2–2	1–1	1–3	1–0	0–2	3–2	1–2	0–0	—	2–1	1–2	3–1	3–7	1–1	1–3
Nuneaton Griff	2–2	3–1	0–1	4–2	3–0	3–1	1–1	0–1	1–2	3–1	0–6	1–1	3–2	—	1–2	2–1	0–2	1–1	0–2
Paget Rangers	1–4	1–4	0–2	3–0	1–4	3–2	2–1	2–1	1–1	3–1	2–2	1–0	2–2	1–2	—	2–1	1–5	2–2	0–1
Shawbury United	4–0	1–1	2–3	1–1	2–2	1–2	2–1	1–2	0–2	2–0	1–2	1–2	2–0	0–2	1–3	—	0–0	1–3	0–1
Stapenhill	1–1	4–2	3–0	1–2	1–1	1–0	4–2	2–0	2–2	5–1	1–3	1–2	0–3	2–0	2–0	7–1	—	4–1	3–1
Wednesfield	2–0	1–2	0–4	0–2	1–2	2–1	3–0	1–2	0–1	3–2	1–1	3–2	0–2	0–0	1–0	5–1	0–2	—	1–1
Wolverhampton Sporting	6–1	1–2	0–3	5–3	+/- (Note: Wolverhampton Sporting v OJM Black Country Rangers (30 April 2022) was declared a home walkover after OJM Black Country failed to raise a team.)	1–1	2–1	1–2	2–4	3–1	0–1	1–2	4–1	1–3	1–0	4–0	1–3	1–0	—

Source: Midland League
Legend: Blue = home team win; Yellow = draw; Red = away team win.
For upcoming matches, an "a" indicates there is an article about the rivalry between the two participants.

=== Stadia and locations ===
Location of the clubs in the 2021–22 Midland League Division One
Location of the Staffordshire nearby clubs in the 2021–22 Midland League Division One

Club	Location	Stadium	Capacity
AFC Bridgnorth	Bridgnorth	Crown Meadow	
Ashby Ivanhoe	Ashby-de-la-Zouch	Lower Packington Road	
Atherstone Town	Atherstone	Sheepy Road	3,000
Bilston Town	Bilston	Queen Street	
Black Country Rangers	Lye	The Sports Ground (Note: Groundshare with Lye Town)	
Chelmsley Town	Coleshill	Pack Meadow	
Coventry Copsewood	Coventry	Allard Way	2,000
Cradley Town	Cradley	Beeches View	
Darlaston Town (1874)	Walsall	Bentley Sports Pavilion	
Dudley Sports	Brierley Hill	Hillcrest Avenue	
Dudley Town	Willenhall	Aspray 24 Arena (Note: Groundshare with Sporting Khalsa)	
Heath Hayes	Heath Hayes	Coppice Colliery Ground	
Nuneaton Griff	Nuneaton	Pingles Stadium	6,000
Paget Rangers	Sutton Coldfield	Coles Lane	2,000
Shawbury United	Ludlow	Ludlow Football Stadium	1,000
Smethwick Khalsa Football Federation	Tividale	The Beeches (Note: Groundshare with Tividale)	
Stapenhill	Stapenhill	Edge Hill	1,000
Wednesfield	Wednesfield	Cottage Ground	
Wolverhampton Sporting	Great Wyrley	Pride Park	

== Division Two ==
Midland Football League Division Two
- Season: 2021–22
- Champions: Cadbury Athletic
- Promoted: Coton Green

Division Two featured 12 clubs which competed in the division last season, along with 3 new clubs:

- Cadbury Athletic, voluntary demoted from Division One
- Kenilworth Sporting, promoted from Division Three
- Inkberrow, promoted from Division Three

=== League table ===
Pos	Team	Pld	W	D	L	GF	GA	GD	Pts	Promotion or relegation
1	Cadbury Athletic	28	19	9	0	82	17	+65	66	
2	Coton Green	28	17	6	5	61	34	+27	57	Promoted to Division One
3	Knowle	28	17	5	6	70	30	+40	56	
4	Fairfield Villa	28	15	6	7	54	40	+14	51	
5	Kenilworth Sporting	28	13	9	6	52	32	+20	48	
6	Inkberrow	28	14	2	12	62	45	+17	44	
7	Alcester Town	28	11	11	6	63	49	+14	44	
8	Redditch Borough	28	9	5	14	44	43	+1	32	
9	Earlswood Town	28	8	6	14	40	60	−20	30	
10	Coventry Alvis	28	8	6	14	35	70	−35	30	
11	Hampton	28	7	6	15	34	61	−27	27	
12	Barnt Green Spartak	28	5	10	13	33	50	−17	25	
13	Boldmere Sports & Social Falcon	28	6	6	16	39	50	−11	24	
14	Lane Head	28	5	8	15	37	70	−33	23	
15	Bolehall Swifts	28	5	7	16	19	74	−55	22	

Source: FA Full-Time

== Division Three ==
Midland Football League Division Three
- Season: 2021–22
- Champions: AFC Coventry Rangers
- Promoted: AFC Coventry Rangers; Sutton United

Division Three featured 11 clubs which competed in the division last season, along with 5 new club:

- AFC Coventry Rangers
- AFC Birmingham, transferred from the West Midlands (Regional) League Division Two
- Balsall and Berkswell, joined from the Coventry Alliance
- DSC United
- Bartley Reds

=== League table ===
Pos	Team	Pld	W	D	L	GF	GA	GD	Pts	Promotion or relegation
1	AFC Coventry Rangers	28	23	2	3	140	29	+111	71	Promoted to Division Two
2	Sutton United	28	20	1	7	104	49	+55	61	Promoted to Division Two
3	Coventrians	28	18	4	6	89	45	+44	58	
4	AFC Solihull	28	19	1	8	91	51	+40	58	
5	Central Ajax	28	18	2	8	84	47	+37	53 (Note: Central Ajax 3 points deducted.)	
6	AFC Birmingham	28	16	4	8	65	39	+26	52	
7	Upton Town	28	15	5	8	82	56	+26	50	Resigned from the league
8	Balsall and Berkswell	28	15	4	9	61	46	+15	49	
9	Enville Athletic	28	13	1	14	54	54	0	40	
10	DSC United	28	8	4	16	62	68	−6	28	
11	Leamington Hibs	28	7	6	15	42	65	−23	27	
12	Castle Vale Town	28	6	3	19	40	99	−59	20 (Note: Castle Vale Town 1 point deducted.)	
13	Birmingham Tigers	28	5	3	20	41	98	−57	18	
14	Continental Star	28	2	3	23	29	105	−76	8 (Note: Continental Star 1 point deducted.)	
15	Bartley Reds	28	2	1	25	17	150	−133	7	Resigned from the league
16	WLV Sport	0	0	0	0	0	0	0	0	Club folded, record expunged

Source: FA Full-Time
Rules for classification: 1) points; 2) goal difference; 3) number of goals scored.
