= 2014–15 West Midlands (Regional) League =

The 2014–15 West Midlands (Regional) League season was the 115th in the history of the West Midlands (Regional) League, an English association football competition for semi-professional and amateur teams based in the West Midlands county, Shropshire, Herefordshire, Worcestershire and southern Staffordshire. It has three divisions, the highest of which is the Premier Division, which sits at step 6 of the National League System, or the tenth level of the overall English football league system.

== Premier Division ==
West Midlands League Premier Division
- Season: 2014–15
- Champions: Sporting Khalsa
- Promoted: Sporting Khalsa
- Relegated: Shifnal Town; Wednesfield
- Matches: 462
- Goals: 1,876 (4.06 per match)

The Premier Division featured 19 clubs which competed in the division last season, along with three new clubs:

- A.F.C. Bridgnorth, promoted from Division One
- Gornal Athletic, relegated from the Midland Football Alliance
- Haughmond, promoted from Division One

=== League table ===
Pos	Team	Pld	W	D	L	GF	GA	GD	Pts	Promotion or relegation
1	Sporting Khalsa	42	38	3	1	143	25	+118	117	Promoted to the Midland League
2	A.F.C. Bridgnorth	42	28	6	8	108	45	+63	90	
3	Gornal Athletic	42	28	6	8	102	45	+57	90	
4	Ellesmere Rangers	42	24	9	9	100	52	+48	81	
5	Malvern Town	42	23	9	10	110	59	+51	78	
6	Wolverhampton Casuals	42	22	7	13	94	81	+13	73	
7	Shawbury United	42	22	6	14	129	84	+45	72	
8	Haughmond	42	20	10	12	86	63	+23	70	
9	Pegasus Juniors	42	20	5	17	80	56	+24	65	
10	Black Country Rangers	42	17	9	16	98	93	+5	60	
11	Wellington	42	16	11	15	83	71	+12	59	
12	Dudley Sports	42	17	6	19	71	80	−9	57	
13	Bilston Town	42	16	5	21	67	93	−26	53	
14	Dudley Town	42	14	8	20	85	93	−8	50	
15	Cradley Town	42	13	5	24	83	124	−41	44	
16	Wolverhampton Sporting Community	42	12	6	24	70	99	−29	42	
17	Bewdley Town	42	11	7	24	72	95	−23	40	
18	Willenhall Town	42	9	12	21	68	104	−36	39	
19	Smethwick Rangers	42	11	6	25	76	116	−40	39	
20	Wellington Amateurs	42	10	5	27	50	122	−72	35	
21	Shifnal Town	42	8	8	26	48	106	−58	32	Relegated to Division One
22	Wednesfield	42	5	7	30	53	170	−117	22	Relegated to Division One

Source: fchd
Rules for classification: 1) points; 2) goal difference; 3) number of goals scored.

=== Results ===
Home \ Away	BRI	BEW	BIL	BLA	CRA	DUD	DUT	ELL	GOR	HAU	MAL	PEJ	SHA	SHI	SME	SPK	WED	WEH	WEL	WIL	WOC	WSC
A.F.C. Bridgnorth		2–0	1–2	4–1	4–0	4–3	5–1	0–3	2–0	1–1	1–0	0–0	3–1	1–1	7–0	1–2	4–0	1–0	6–1	5–1	4–0	5–2
Bewdley Town	0–1		0–1	6–1	2–1	0–2	1–1	1–2	2–4	1–0	1–3	2–0	3–4	0–2	0–1	1–6	1–2	1–1	1–1	3–2	3–4	0–2
Bilston Town	2–3	1–4		1–7	6–1	2–2	2–1	1–0	0–4	1–0	1–1	3–2	1–8	0–2	0–2	0–3	7–0	2–2	1–3	3–2	2–2	4–2
Black Country Rangers	2–1	4–1	0–2		0–1	2–1	1–0	1–3	1–3	0–1	1–1	2–1	5–2	2–4	3–3	0–3	6–5	0–0	4–2	3–3	3–4	4–2
Cradley Town	1–1	2–5	2–1	4–7		1–4	1–1	2–5	0–1	1–2	0–5	2–4	3–2	5–1	2–5	0–1	6–1	4–3	5–0	2–2	1–3	1–2
Dudley Sports	0–1	2–4	2–1	1–4	2–0		3–2	2–2	0–3	2–3	0–0	1–0	0–2	2–1	1–2	1–7	4–0	0–2	3–1	0–1	2–1	1–4
Dudley Town	0–0	3–2	3–1	5–4	2–3	1–0		2–4	1–1	2–2	0–4	0–5	1–5	5–1	2–3	1–6	4–2	1–3	3–1	3–1	2–3	2–5
Ellesmere Rangers	3–1	4–0	2–1	1–1	8–1	3–2	0–1		0–1	2–3	1–1	1–0	2–2	3–0	7–0	2–0	4–1	1–0	4–0	2–2	2–2	3–1
Gornal Athletic	2–4	2–1	3–1	1–1	1–2	3–0	2–1	3–1		0–1	0–3	1–0	2–1	1–0	5–0	0–3	5–1	2–2	4–0	2–1	4–0	4–2
Haughmond	0–1	2–0	3–2	0–1	1–3	2–2	4–4	2–0	2–2		4–2	2–2	3–6	2–1	1–3	2–3	0–0	0–0	4–1	3–1	3–3	4–0
Malvern Town	0–2	2–3	5–2	7–0	4–3	2–2	2–3	4–1	0–6	4–1		3–0	3–1	3–1	4–3	1–3	2–1	0–1	3–2	1–1	5–0	1–0
Pegasus Juniors	1–3	4–2	5–0	0–1	4–0	0–1	3–2	2–0	0–4	1–3	3–2		2–2	3–0	5–2	1–1	3–0	1–2	4–0	2–3	0–3	4–1
Shawbury United	3–0	5–2	2–1	5–0	8–0	1–2	0–5	0–4	0–2	2–0	1–1	2–0		5–0	4–1	1–4	5–4	2–5	9–1	3–3	4–1	3–1
Shifnal Town	0–4	1–4	0–1	5–3	1–2	6–1	1–0	1–1	2–2	1–1	0–5	1–2	1–5		0–0	1–5	0–1	1–1	2–2	1–4	0–0	0–8
Smethwick Rangers	2–4	3–2	1–2	2–2	2–4	1–4	2–3	1–2	1–4	1–3	1–4	1–2	4–2	1–2		0–1	2–5	0–0	3–0	1–5	1–2	2–2
Sporting Khalsa	3–1	6–0	5–1	2–1	3–0	3–0	1–0	1–1	3–0	2–1	6–0	0–0	3–0	3–1	5–0		2–0	5–1	3–0	11–0	3–0	4–0
Wednesfield	0–6	3–3	0–4	0–8	4–4	1–1	2–2	0–6	1–4	1–10	0–12	0–4	2–2	1–3	2–5	0–6		1–6	1–2	2–1	1–6	3–2
Wellington	2–2	1–4	5–0	2–1	7–4	2–4	3–0	2–2	1–0	1–4	0–1	0–3	2–5	4–2	3–2	0–2	7–0		1–1	2–1	4–5	0–1
Wellington Amateurs	0–2	2–1	1–0	1–5	1–4	1–3	0–5	0–3	0–4	1–4	1–6	0–3	2–2	1–0	4–2	3–4	3–1	1–0		2–0	0–2	1–1
Willenhall Town	1–6	3–3	0–0	1–1	4–4	2–1	1–1	1–2	2–2	0–1	1–1	0–2	1–3	2–0	3–2	1–2	4–1	1–4	4–3		1–3	0–4
Wolverhampton Casuals	4–1	0–0	2–3	2–5	1–0	0–2	3–2	5–1	2–5	2–0	1–1	3–0	4–0	6–0	1–6	1–3	2–1	0–0	4–2	4–0		0–2
Wolverhampton Sporting Community	0–3	2–2	0–1	0–2	3–1	2–5	0–7	1–2	0–3	0–1	0–1	0–2	0–9	4–1	2–2	1–4	2–2	3–1	1–2	3–1	2–3	

Legend: Blue = home team win; Yellow = draw; Red = away team win.
