= 2010–11 West Midlands (Regional) League =

The 2010–11 West Midlands (Regional) League season was the 111th in the history of the West Midlands (Regional) League, an English association football competition for semi-professional and amateur teams based in the West Midlands county, Shropshire, Herefordshire, Worcestershire and southern Staffordshire. It has three divisions, the highest of which is the Premier Division, which sits at step 6 of the National League System, or the tenth level of the overall English football league system.

== Premier Division ==
West Midlands League Premier Division
- Season: 2010–11
- Champions: Tividale
- Promoted: Tividale
- Matches: 380
- Goals: 1,497 (3.94 per match)

The Premier Division featured 17 clubs which competed in the division last season, along with three new clubs:

- Cradley Town, relegated from the Midland Football Alliance
- Shifnal Town, relegated from the Midland Football Alliance
- Stafford Town, promoted from Division One

Also, Heath Town Rangers changed name to Wolverhampton Sporting Community.

=== League table ===
Pos	Team	Pld	W	D	L	GF	GA	GD	Pts	Promotion or relegation
1	Tividale	38	31	4	3	123	33	+90	97	Promoted to the Midland Football Alliance
2	Gornal Athletic	38	27	5	6	106	43	+63	86	
3	AFC Wulfrunians	38	27	2	9	117	41	+76	83	
4	Wednesfield	38	24	8	6	87	38	+49	80	
5	Bustleholme	38	21	11	6	81	59	+22	74	
6	Bewdley Town	38	22	7	9	98	55	+43	73	
7	Bloxwich United	38	20	8	10	89	72	+17	68	Transferred to the Midland Football Combination
8	Cradley Town	38	17	7	14	90	71	+19	58	
9	Shifnal Town	38	16	6	16	79	67	+12	54	
10	Wellington	38	15	5	18	76	67	+9	50	
11	Lye Town	38	14	6	18	69	72	−3	48	
12	Wolverhampton Casuals	38	14	3	21	58	71	−13	45	
13	Dudley Town	38	12	5	21	53	106	−53	41	
14	Dudley Sports	38	13	0	25	47	88	−41	39	
15	Stafford Town	38	11	5	22	69	105	−36	38	
16	Darlaston Town	38	11	3	24	51	98	−47	36	
17	Shawbury United	38	10	5	23	48	96	−48	35	
18	Wolverhampton Sporting Community	38	9	3	26	55	88	−33	30	
19	Goodrich	38	9	2	27	53	116	−63	29	
20	Bromyard Town	38	8	3	27	48	111	−63	27	

Source: fchd
Rules for classification: 1) points; 2) goal difference; 3) number of goals scored.

=== Stadia and locations ===
Map showing the location of teams in 2010–11 West Midlands (Regional) League Premier Division season

Team	Location	Stadium	Capacity
AFC Wulfrunians	Wolverhampton	Castlecroft Stadium	
Bewdley Town	Bewdley	Ribbesford Meadows	
Bloxwich United	Bloxwich	Old Red Lion Ground	
Bromyard Town	Bromyard	Delahay Meadow	
Bustleholme	Tipton	Tipton Sports Academy	1,000
Cradley Town	Cradley	Beeches View	
Darlaston Town	Darlaston	City Ground	
Dudley Sports	Brierley Hill	Hillcrest Avenue	
Dudley Town	Brierley Hill	Dell Sports Centre	
Goodrich	Wolverhampton	Goodrich Sports Ground	
Gornal Athletic	Gornal	Garden Walk Stadium	
Lye Town	Lye	The Sports Ground	
Shawbury United	Wem	Butler Sports Ground	
Shifnal Town	Shifnal	Phoenix Park	
Stafford Town	Stafford	Evans Park	600
Tividale	Tividale	The Beeches	2,800
Wednesfield	Wednesfield	Cottage Ground	
Wellington	Wellington	Wellington Playing Fields	1,000
Wolverhampton Casuals	Featherstone	Brinsford Lane	
Wolverhampton Sporting	Wednesfield	Cottage Ground	
