= 2023–24 Midland Football League =

Midland Football League
- Season: 2023–24
- Champions: Congleton Town
- Promoted: Congleton Town; Darlaston Town (1874)

The 2023–24 Midland Football League season was the tenth in the history of the Midland Football League, a football competition in England. The Midland League operates two divisions in the English football league system, the Premier Division at Step 5 and Division One at Step 6; these two divisions are covered by this article.

The allocations for Steps 3 to 6 for this season were announced by The Football Association on 15 May 2023, and were subject to appeals. Starting this season, the Premier Division in the league promotes two clubs; one as champions and one via a four-team play-off. This replaced the previous inter-step play-off system. Solely for this season, there was only one club relegated from the Step 5 division.

== Premier Division ==
This division comprises 18 teams, two fewer than the previous season.

The following 5 clubs left the division before the season:

- Lye Town - promoted to Northern Premier League Division One Midlands
- Market Drayton Town - relegated to North West Counties League Division One South
- Racing Club Warwick - transferred to the United Counties League Premier Division South
- Walsall Wood - promoted to Northern Premier League Division One Midlands
- Worcester City - transferred to the Hellenic League Premier Division

The following 3 clubs joined the division:

- Congleton Town - transferred from the North West Counties League Premier Division
- Dudley Town - promoted from Division One
- Northwich Victoria - transferred from the North West Counties League Premier Division

=== Premier Division table ===
Pos	Team	Pld	W	D	L	GF	GA	GD	Pts	Promotion, qualification or relegation
1	Congleton Town (C, P)	34	25	6	3	101	31	+70	81	Promotion to the Northern Premier League
2	Lichfield City	34	22	7	5	81	33	+48	73	Qualification for the play-offs (Note: Four teams play for one spot and promotion to Step 4)
3	Darlaston Town (1874) (O, P)	34	19	9	6	84	42	+42	66	Qualification for the play-offs
4	Stourport Swifts	34	18	8	8	69	58	+11	62	Qualification for the play-offs
5	Highgate United	34	19	4	11	81	50	+31	61	Qualification for the play-offs
6	Studley	34	18	7	9	77	46	+31	61	
7	Dudley Town	34	15	6	13	65	61	+4	51	
8	Atherstone Town	34	14	7	13	53	49	+4	49	
9	Shifnal Town	34	14	4	16	59	47	+12	46	
10	Whitchurch Alport	34	14	4	16	59	61	−2	46	
11	AFC Wulfrunians	34	13	6	15	48	52	−4	45	
12	Uttoxeter Town	34	12	8	14	60	59	+1	44	
13	Northwich Victoria	34	12	8	14	56	70	−14	44	
14	Romulus	34	9	8	17	51	65	−14	35	
15	Stone Old Alleynians	34	7	12	15	49	59	−10	33	
16	Wolverhampton Casuals	34	8	8	18	46	77	−31	32	
17	Tividale	34	5	9	20	38	77	−39	24	
18	Bewdley Town (R)	34	1	1	32	16	156	−140	4	Relegation to the Hellenic League

Source: The FA
Rules for classification: 1) points; 2) goal difference; 3) number of goals scored; 4) number of matches won; 5) head-to-head results
(C) Champions; (O) Play-off winners; (P) Promoted; (R) Relegated

=== Play-offs ===
Semi-finals
2	Lichfield City	3
5	Highgate United	1
3	Darlaston Town (1874)	3
4	Stourport Swifts	1

Final
2	Lichfield City	1
3	Darlaston Town (1874)	3

==== Semifinals ====
27 April	Lichfield City	3–1	Highgate United	Lichfield
15:00	Edwards; Smith	Report	Brown 90'	Stadium: City Ground; Attendance: 424

27 April	Darlaston Town (1874)	3–1	Stourport Swifts	Walsall
15:00	Cook 34'; Foreshaw 56', 79'	Report	Baker 40'	Stadium: Bentley Sports Pavilion; Attendance: 351

==== Final ====
4 May	Lichfield City	1–3	Darlaston Town (1874)	Lichfield
15:00	Burnside 47'	Report	Cook 2'; Jones 29'; Miller 90+5'	Stadium: City Ground; Attendance: 1,110

=== Stadia and locations ===
Location of the clubs in the 2023–24 Midland League Premier Division
Location of the clubs in the 2023–24 Midland League Premier Division
1 Congleton Town F.C.
2 Northwich Victoria F.C.
3 Whitchurch Alport F.C.
4 Studley F.C.
5 Atherstone Town
6 A.F.C. Wulfrunians
Location of the clubs in the 2023–24 Midland League Premier Division from Cheshire

Club	Location	Stadium	Capacity
AFC Wulfrunians	Wolverhampton	Castlecroft Stadium	2,000
Atherstone Town	Atherstone	Sheepy Road	
Bewdley Town	Bewdley	Ribbesford Meadows	1,000
Congleton Town	Congleton	Cleric Stadium	1,450
Darlaston Town (1874)	Walsall	Bentley Sports Pavilion	
Dudley Town	Willenhall	Asprey Arena	
Highgate United	Shirley	The Coppice	2,000
Lichfield City	Lichfield	City Ground	1,000
Northwich Victoria	Northwich	Wincham Park	4,813
Romulus	Birmingham (Castle Vale)	Castle Vale Stadium	2,000
Shifnal Town	Shifnal	Phoenix Park	
Stone Old Alleynians	Meir Heath	King's Park	
Stourport Swifts	Stourport-on-Severn	Walshes Meadow	2,000
Studley	Studley	The Beehive	
Tividale	Tividale	The Beeches	2,000
Uttoxeter Town	Uttoxeter	Oldfields	
Whitchurch Alport	Whitchurch	Yockings Park	
Wolverhampton Casuals	Featherstone	Brinsford Lane	

== Division One ==
This division comprises 20 teams, one fewer than the previous season.

The following 4 clubs left the division before the season:

- Ashby Ivanhoe - promoted to the United Counties League Premier Division North
- Dudley Town - promoted to the Premier Division
- Haughmond - relegated to the Shropshire County League Premier Division
- Heath Hayes - club folded

The following 3 clubs joined the division:

- Allscott Heath - promoted from the West Midlands (Regional) League Division One
- Heather St John's - relegated from the United Counties League Premier Division North
- Sutton United - promoted from Division Two

=== Division One table ===
Pos	Team	Pld	W	D	L	GF	GA	GD	Pts	Promotion, qualification or relegation
1	Hinckley (C, P)	38	27	5	6	114	47	+67	86	Promotion to the United Counties League
2	Allscott Heath	38	25	5	8	90	62	+28	80	Qualification for the play-offs, then transfer to the North West Counties League
3	OJM CFC (O, P)	38	22	8	8	83	40	+43	74	Qualification for the play-offs (Note: Four teams play for one spot and promotion to Step 5)
4	Ingles	38	22	7	9	74	48	+26	73	Qualification for the play-offs
5	Droitwich Spa	38	22	6	10	113	68	+45	72	Qualification for the play-offs, then transfer to the Hellenic League
6	Wednesfield	38	22	6	10	82	54	+28	72	
7	Cradley Town	38	17	10	11	84	61	+23	61	
8	Heather St John's	38	17	7	14	81	60	+21	58	
9	Bilston Town	38	17	4	17	84	68	+16	55	
10	Shawbury United	38	15	7	16	72	74	−2	52	Transfer to the North West Counties League
11	Coventry Copsewood	38	14	9	15	71	65	+6	51	
12	Sutton United	38	12	12	14	68	71	−3	48	
13	Stapenhill	38	13	8	17	64	72	−8	47	
14	Nuneaton Griff	38	13	8	17	65	81	−16	47	
15	Coton Green	38	12	10	16	53	63	−10	46	
16	Wolverhampton Sporting	38	10	6	22	48	74	−26	36	Transfer to the North West Counties League
17	Chelmsley Town	38	8	9	21	43	98	−55	33	
18	Smethwick Rangers	38	9	3	26	43	100	−57	30	
19	Paget Rangers	38	8	3	27	49	109	−60	27	
20	AFC Bridgnorth	38	4	9	25	48	114	−66	21	Reprieve from relegation

Source: The FA
Rules for classification: 1) points; 2) goal difference; 3) number of goals scored; 4) number of matches won; 5) head-to-head results
(C) Champions; (O) Play-off winners; (P) Promoted

=== Play-offs ===
Semi-finals
2	Allscott Heath	1
5	Droitwich Spa	3
3	OJM CFC	2
4	Ingles	0

Final
3	OJM CFC	1 (5)
5	Droitwich Spa	1 (3)

==== Semifinals ====
27 April	Allscott Heath	1–3	Droitwich Spa	Allscott
15:00	Morris	Report	Brighton 43'; Lemon 45', 64'	Stadium: Allscott Sports & Social Club; Attendance: 231

27 April	OJM CFC	2–0	Ingles	Kings Norton
15:00	Williams; Ali	Report		Stadium: Triplex Sports Ground; Attendance: 92

==== Final ====
4 May	OJM CFC	1–1 (a.e.t.) (5–3 p)	Droitwich Spa	Kings Norton
15:00		Report		Stadium: Triplex Sports Ground; Attendance: 558

=== Stadia and locations ===
Location of the clubs in the 2023–24 Midland League Division One
Location of the clubs in the 2023–24 Midland League Division One
Location of the clubs in the 2023–24 Midland League Division One

Club	Location	Stadium	Capacity
AFC Bridgnorth	Bridgnorth	Crown Meadow	
Allscott Heath	Allscott	Allscott Sports & Social Club	
Bilston Town	Bilston	Queen Street	4,000
Chelmsley Town	Coleshill	Pack Meadow	
Coton Green	Fazeley	New Mill Lane	
Coventry Copsewood	Coventry	Allard Way	2,000
Cradley Town	Cradley	Beeches View	
Droitwich Spa	Droitwich Spa	King George V Ground	2,000
Heather St John's	Heather	St John's Park	2,050
Hinckley	Barwell	Kirkby Road	2,500
Ingles	Thringstone	Homestead Road	2,050
Nuneaton Griff	Nuneaton	Pingles Stadium	4,000
OJM CFC	Birmingham (Kings Norton)	Triplex Sports Ground	
Paget Rangers	Sutton Coldfield	Central Ground	2,000
Shawbury United	Shrewsbury	New Meadow Community 3G	1,000
Smethwick Rangers	Boldmere	Trevor Brown Memorial Ground	2,500
Stapenhill	Stapenhill	Edge Hill	1,500
Sutton United	Sutton Coldfield	Coleshill Road	
Wednesfield	Wednesfield	Cottage Ground	
Wolverhampton Sporting	Great Wyrley	Pride Park	

== Division Two ==
Midland Football League Division Two
- Season: 2023–24
- Champions: Redditch Borough
- Promoted: Redditch Borough

Division Two featured 13 clubs which competed in the division last season, along with 3 new clubs:

- Coventrians, promoted from Division Three
- Central Ajax, promoted from Division Three
- Littleton, relegated from Hellenic League Division One

=== League table ===
Pos	Team	Pld	W	D	L	GF	GA	GD	Pts	Promotion or relegation
1	Redditch Borough	30	24	5	1	82	19	+63	77	Promoted to Hellenic League Division One
2	AFC Coventry Rangers	30	21	2	7	67	34	+33	65	
3	Knowle	30	19	7	4	80	20	+60	64	
4	Alcester Town	30	17	6	7	68	44	+24	57	Transferred to Herefordshire League
5	Hampton	30	16	5	9	60	43	+17	53	
6	Birmingham United	30	16	4	10	59	43	+16	52	
7	Coventry Alvis	30	12	4	14	60	62	−2	40	
8	Coventrians	30	11	6	13	44	59	−15	39	
9	Central Ajax	30	9	8	13	52	62	−10	35	
10	Lane Head	30	10	2	18	47	61	−14	32	
11	Cadbury Athletic	30	9	4	17	45	52	−7	31	
12	Earlswood Town	30	9	4	17	56	91	−35	31	
13	Inkberrow	30	9	4	17	40	75	−35	31	
14	Bolehall Swifts	30	8	3	19	28	67	−39	27	
15	Littleton	30	7	5	18	37	69	−32	26	
16	Fairfield Villa	30	6	5	19	40	64	−24	23	

Source: FA Full-Time

== Division Three ==
Midland Football League Division Three
- Season: 2023–24
- Champions: AFC Solihull
- Promoted: AFC Solihull; Northfield Town

Division Three featured 10 clubs which competed in the division last season, along with 7 new clubs:

- Boldmere Sports & Social Falcons, relegated from Division Two
- Northfield Town, joined from Birmingham & District League
- Silhill, joined from Birmingham & District League
- Feckenham, joined from Hellenic League Division Two West
- Meadow Park, joined from Hellenic League Division Two West
- BNJS, joined from Birmingham & District League
- Gornal

=== League table ===
Pos	Team	Pld	W	D	L	GF	GA	GD	Pts	Promotion or relegation
1	AFC Solihull	32	26	2	4	101	38	+63	80	Promoted to Division Two
2	Northfield Town	32	23	5	4	101	42	+59	74	Promoted to Division Two
3	AFC Birmingham	32	21	6	5	89	32	+57	69	
4	Silhill	32	21	5	6	101	40	+61	68	
5	Feckenham	32	20	5	7	96	35	+61	65	
6	Wake Green Amateur	32	18	5	9	82	54	+28	59	
7	Castle Vale Town	32	16	6	10	67	53	+14	54	
8	DSC United	32	14	2	16	73	80	−7	44	Resigned from the league
9	Balsall and Berkswell	32	12	8	12	56	56	0	43 (Note: Balsall & Berkswell 1 point deducted.)	
10	Meadow Park	32	11	2	19	63	76	−13	35	
11	Boldmere Sports & Social Falcons	32	11	4	17	63	72	−9	34 (Note: Boldmere Sports & Social Falcons 3 points deducted.)	
12	Continental Star	32	11	6	15	63	67	−4	33 (Note: Continental Star 6 points deducted.)	
13	Solihull Sporting	32	9	3	20	69	93	−24	30	
14	Leamington Hibs	32	8	2	22	36	93	−57	26	
15	BNJS	32	7	6	19	58	102	−44	24 (Note: BNJS 3 points deducted.)	
16	Gornal	32	7	2	23	47	99	−52	23	
17	Birmingham Tigers	32	0	3	29	26	159	−133	3	

Source: FA Full-Time
Rules for classification: 1) points; 2) goal difference; 3) number of goals scored.
