= 2022–23 Midland Football League =

Midland Football League
- Season: 2022–23

The 2022–23 Midland Football League season was the ninth in the history of the Midland Football League, a football competition in England. The Midland League operates two divisions in the English football league system, the Premier Division at Step 5, and Division One at Step 6, and these two divisions are covered by this article.

The allocations for Steps 3 to 6 for this season were announced by The Football Association on 12 May 2022, and were subject to appeals.

== Premier Division ==
This division comprises 20 teams, one more than the previous season.

The following 3 clubs left the division before the season:

- Boldmere St Michaels - promoted to Northern Premier League Division One Midlands
- Hanley Town - promoted to Northern Premier League Division One West
- Haughmond - relegated to Division One

The following 4 clubs joined the division:

- Atherstone Town - promoted from Division One
- Darlaston Town (1874) - promoted from Division One
- Market Drayton Town - relegated from Northern Premier League Division One West
- Studley - promoted from Hellenic League Division One

=== Premier Division table ===
Pos	Team	Pld	W	D	L	GF	GA	GD	Pts	Promotion, qualification or relegation
1	Walsall Wood (C, P)	38	26	7	5	73	35	+38	85	Promotion to the Northern Premier League
2	Lye Town (O, P)	38	25	3	10	85	52	+33	78	Qualification for the inter-step play-off
3	Highgate United	38	23	5	10	86	45	+41	74	
4	Darlaston Town (1874)	38	21	8	9	70	38	+32	71	
5	Racing Club Warwick	38	21	7	10	84	47	+37	70	Transfer to the United Counties League
6	Romulus	38	21	5	12	81	55	+26	68	
7	Stourport Swifts	38	22	2	14	61	41	+20	68	
8	Shifnal Town	38	18	10	10	65	43	+22	64	
9	Whitchurch Alport	38	18	4	16	66	62	+4	58	
10	Atherstone Town	38	17	6	15	63	56	+7	57	
11	Lichfield City	38	14	12	12	65	60	+5	54	
12	AFC Wulfrunians	38	14	7	17	56	57	−1	49	
13	Stone Old Alleynians	38	14	5	19	51	71	−20	47	
14	Studley	38	13	10	15	55	58	−3	46 (Note: Studley were deducted three points for fielding an ineligible player.)	
15	Tividale	38	13	7	18	45	58	−13	46	
16	Bewdley Town	38	13	5	20	58	85	−27	44	
17	Worcester City	38	9	5	24	35	69	−34	32	Transfer to the Hellenic League
18	Wolverhampton Casuals	38	7	7	24	31	79	−48	28	
19	Uttoxeter Town	38	6	6	26	32	84	−52	24	Reprieve from relegation
20	Market Drayton Town (R)	38	3	3	32	27	94	−67	12	Relegation to the North West Counties League; Division One South

Source: The FA Full-Time
Rules for classification: 1) points; 2) goal difference; 3) number of goals scored; 4) number of matches won; 5) head-to-head results
(C) Champions; (O) Play-off winners; (P) Promoted; (R) Relegated

=== Play-off ===
Inter-Step Playoff

29 April 2023	St Neots Town	1–6	Lye Town	St Neots
15:00	Anderson 78'	Report	Meacham 2'; Hesson 20', 53', 88'; Palmer 62', 74'	Stadium: New Rowley Park; Attendance: 548

=== Results table ===
Home \ Away	WUL	ATH	BEW	DAR	HIG	LIC	LYE	MDT	RCW	ROM	SHI	SOA	STO	STU	TIV	UTT	WLW	WHI	WVC	WOR
AFC Wulfrunians	—	0–2	1–0	1–2	0–1	2–3	0–3	3–0	1–1	2–2	5–0	0–2	1–2	0–1	1–2	3–0	2–5	2–1	1–0	4–1
Atherstone Town	3–1	—	1–1	1–0	2–1	1–0	3–0	6–1	0–3	1–0	1–4	3–2	0–1	5–3	3–2	0–1	1–1	5–1	2–1	0–0
Bewdley Town	0–1	2–1	—	1–3	1–4	6–4	3–4	3–2	2–2	0–3	0–4	3–2	1–2	2–1	2–1	4–4	0–3	1–3	1–3	0–1
Darlaston Town (1874)	0–2	1–0	0–1	—	1–1	4–2	7–2	2–1	1–1	1–1	3–2	3–1	2–0	2–0	4–1	2–0	2–0	2–1	1–0	2–0
Highgate United	3–0	3–1	4–1	2–2	—	8–0	4–2	1–0	0–1	3–1	3–0	0–1	1–3	1–6	2–0	6–1	0–2	2–1	3–0	3–1
Lichfield City	1–1	2–1	2–2	0–1	2–2	—	0–1	3–0	1–1	2–2	0–0	3–1	2–0	4–1	1–0	1–0	1–2	2–2	6–1	3–1
Lye Town	1–0	1–0	3–1	0–2	2–0	3–1	—	2–0	3–1	5–1	0–3	4–0	2–0	0–0	6–0	4–0	0–1	0–1	5–1	3–1
Market Drayton Town	2–4	0–4	0–2	1–1	0–4	1–0	3–4	—	0–2	1–3	0–2	1–2	1–4	2–5	2–3	2–1	0–1	0–1	1–1	0–2
Racing Club Warwick	6–3	3–0	5–1	3–0	0–1	0–4	3–3	7–0	—	0–1	2–1	3–0	1–0	4–2	1–2	5–0	2–3	2–0	2–0	4–1
Romulus	1–2	3–1	1–2	1–0	1–3	2–0	3–3	4–1	2–0	—	2–1	4–0	3–5	1–0	0–2	8–0	4–3	2–1	5–0	2–1
Shifnal Town	0–0	3–0	3–0	2–1	1–1	2–2	0–1	2–0	1–1	3–3	—	0–2	2–1	1–1	2–0	1–0	3–3	1–2	2–0	2–0
Stone Old Alleynians	1–3	1–1	3–2	3–1	2–1	1–3	1–3	1–0	0–4	3–2	0–4	—	3–1	2–4	1–0	3–0	2–2	0–5	1–1	1–1
Stourport Swifts	0–1	4–2	5–2	2–1	2–3	3–0	3–1	1–0	0–2	0–2	0–1	2–0	—	2–1	3–0	2–0	0–1	1–0	2–3	3–0
Studley	2–0	0–0	1–3	2–2	3–0	1–1	0–2	2–0	1–3	1–3	1–2	1–0	1–0	—	0–0	0–0	2–3	1–0	3–1	1–1
Tividale	2–2	4–0	2–2	0–0	1–5	2–0	0–3	2–1	4–1	1–0	1–1	0–3	0–0	3–0	—	1–1	0–1	0–1	2–1	0–1
Uttoxeter Town	3–0	1–3	2–0	0–4	1–5	2–3	0–2	1–0	1–2	1–3	0–1	4–3	0–0	1–1	1–3	—	0–1	1–2	3–1	1–2
Walsall Wood	0–0	3–2	3–0	1–0	1–1	1–1	3–1	2–1	1–1	3–0	1–0	1–0	0–1	4–0	3–0	2–1	—	3–2	0–1	2–0
Whitchurch Alport	1–5	0–3	0–1	2–2	0–2	2–2	4–1	6–2	5–2	2–1	3–3	1–0	0–3	1–3	H/W	3–0	2–1	—	1–0	5–4
Wolverhampton Casuals	1–1	1–1	1–2	0–4	2–1	0–3	1–3	0–0	0–2	0–1	0–4	0–0	1–2	1–2	2–1	0–0	2–5	0–4	—	2–1
Worcester City	2–1	1–3	0–3	0–4	0–1	0–0	1–2	0–1	2–1	1–3	3–1	0–3	0–1	1–1	1–3	1–0	0–1	2–0	1–2	—

Source: Midland League
Legend: Blue = home team win; Yellow = draw; Red = away team win.
For upcoming matches, an "a" indicates there is an article about the rivalry between the two participants.

=== Stadia and locations ===
Location of the clubs in the 2022–23 Midland League Premier Division

Club	Location	Stadium	Capacity
AFC Wulfrunians	Wolverhampton	Castlecroft Stadium	2,000
Atherstone Town	Atherstone	Sheepy Road	
Bewdley Town	Bewdley	Ribbesford Meadows	1,000
Darlaston Town (1874)	Walsall	Bentley Sports Pavilion	
Highgate United	Shirley	The Coppice	2,000
Lichfield City	Lichfield	City Ground	1,000
Lye Town	Lye	Lye Sports Ground	1,000
Market Drayton Town	Market Drayton	Greenfields Sports Ground	
Racing Club Warwick	Warwick	Townsend Meadow	1,280
Romulus	Birmingham (Castle Vale)	Castle Vale Stadium	2,000
Shifnal Town	Shifnal	Phoenix Park	
Stone Old Alleynians	Meir Heath	King's Park	
Stourport Swifts	Stourport-on-Severn	Walshes Meadow	2,000
Studley	Studley	The Beehive	
Tividale	Tividale	The Beeches	2,000
Uttoxeter Town	Uttoxeter	Oldfields	
Walsall Wood	Walsall Wood	Oak Park	1,000
Whitchurch Alport	Whitchurch	Yockings Park	
Wolverhampton Casuals	Featherstone	Brinsford Lane	
Worcester City	Worcester	Claines Lane	1,000

== Division One ==
This division comprises 21 teams, two more than the previous season.

The following three clubs left the division before the season:

- Atherstone Town - promoted to Premier Division
- Darlaston Town (1874) - promoted to Premier Division
- Dudley Sports - relegated to West Midlands (Regional) League Division One

The following five clubs joined the division:

- Coton Green - promoted from Division Two
- Droitwich Spa - promoted from West Midlands (Regional) League Division One
- Haughmond - relegated from Premier Division
- Hinckley - transferred from United Counties League Division One
- Ingles - transferred from United Counties League Division One

- Smethwick Khalsa Football Federation were renamed back to Smethwick Rangers before the season began.
- Graham Street Prims - were to be transferred from United Counties League Division One, but requested relegation to the Central Midlands Football League.

=== Division One table ===
Pos	Team	Pld	W	D	L	GF	GA	GD	Pts	Promotion, qualification or relegation
1	Dudley Town (C, P)	40	32	4	4	101	37	+64	100	Promotion to the Premier Division
2	Ashby Ivanhoe (O, P)	40	28	7	5	93	40	+53	91	Promotion to the United Counties League; Premier Division North
3	Hinckley	40	28	3	9	122	51	+71	87	Qualification for the play-offs
4	Droitwich Spa	40	26	5	9	109	65	+44	83	Qualification for the play-offs
5	Black Country Rangers	40	26	4	10	95	46	+49	82	Qualification for the play-offs
6	Bilston Town	40	22	6	12	79	73	+6	72	
7	Stapenhill	40	20	6	14	67	63	+4	66	
8	Nuneaton Griff	40	16	10	14	60	55	+5	58	
9	Coton Green	40	16	10	14	62	61	+1	58	
10	Shawbury United	40	16	4	20	73	83	−10	52	
11	Wolverhampton Sporting	40	14	8	18	61	79	−18	50	
12	Coventry Copsewood	40	14	7	19	68	73	−5	49	
13	Ingles	40	15	4	21	62	83	−21	49	
14	Chelmsley Town	40	14	4	22	54	84	−30	46	
15	Wednesfield	40	11	12	17	61	71	−10	45	
16	Cradley Town	40	11	9	20	55	65	−10	42	
17	Smethwick Rangers	40	10	8	22	51	91	−40	38	
18	Paget Rangers	40	9	9	22	59	82	−23	36	
19	Heath Hayes	40	7	11	22	58	85	−27	32	Club folded
20	AFC Bridgnorth	40	8	6	26	47	90	−43	30	Reprieve from relegation
21	Haughmond (R)	40	4	9	27	40	100	−60	21	Relegation to the Shropshire County League Premier Division

Source: The FA Full-Time
Rules for classification: 1) points; 2) goal difference; 3) number of goals scored; 4) number of matches won; 5) head-to-head results
(C) Champions; (O) Play-off winners; (P) Promoted; (R) Relegated

=== Play-offs ===
Semi-finals
2	Ashby Ivanhoe	1
5	Black Country Rangers	0
3	Hinckley	3 (2)
4	Droitwich Spa	3 (4)

Final
2	Ashby Ivanhoe	2
4	Droitwich Spa	1

==== Semifinals ====
1 May 2023	Hinckley	3–3 (a.e.t.) (2–4 p)	Droitwich Spa	Barwell
		Report		Stadium: Kirkby Road; Attendance: 596

3 May 2023	Ashby Ivanhoe	1–0	Black Country Rangers	Ashby-de-la-Zouch
		Report		Stadium: NFU Sports Ground; Attendance: 506

==== Final ====
6 May 2023	Ashby Ivanhoe	2–1	Droitwich Spa	Ashby-de-la-Zouch
	Quinn 33'; Carta 89'	Report	Tilley 9'	Stadium: NFU Sports Ground; Attendance: 836

=== Stadia and locations ===
Location of the clubs in the 2022–23 Midland League Division One
Location of the Staffordshire nearby clubs in the 2022–23 Midland League Division One

Club	Location	Stadium	Capacity
AFC Bridgnorth	Bridgnorth	Crown Meadow	
Ashby Ivanhoe	Ashby-de-la-Zouch	NFU Sports Ground	
Bilston Town	Bilston	Queen Street	4,000
Black Country Rangers	Lye	Lye Sports Ground	1,000
Chelmsley Town	Coleshill	Pack Meadow	
Coton Green	Fazeley	New Mill Lane	
Coventry Copsewood	Coventry	Allard Way	2,000
Cradley Town	Cradley	Beeches View	
Droitwich Spa	Droitwich Spa	Walshes Meadow, Stourport (groundshare with Stourport Swifts)	
Dudley Town	Willenhall	Noose Lane	
Haughmond	Shrewsbury	Shrewsbury Sports Village	1,000
Heath Hayes	Heath Hayes	Coppice Colliery Ground	
Hinckley	Barwell	Kirkby Road	2,500
Ingles	Thringstone	Homestead Road	2,050
Nuneaton Griff	Nuneaton	Pingles Stadium	4,000
Paget Rangers	Sutton Coldfield	Central Ground	2,000
Shawbury United	Ludlow	Ludlow Football Stadium	1,000
Smethwick Rangers	Tividale	The Beeches	2,000
Stapenhill	Stapenhill	Edge Hill	1,500
Wednesfield	Wednesfield	Cottage Ground	
Wolverhampton Sporting	Great Wyrley	Pride Park	

== Division Two ==
Midland Football League Division Two
- Season: 2022–23
- Champions: Sutton United
- Promoted: Sutton United
- Relegated: Boldmere Sports & Social Falcon

Division Two featured 14 clubs which competed in the division last season, along with 2 new clubs:

- AFC Coventry Rangers, promoted from Division Three
- Sutton United, promoted from Division Three

Also, Barnt Green Spartak changed name to Birmingham United.

=== League table ===
Pos	Team	Pld	W	D	L	GF	GA	GD	Pts	Promotion or relegation
1	Sutton United	30	21	4	5	107	43	+64	67	Promoted to Division One
2	AFC Coventry Rangers	30	19	9	2	73	35	+38	66	
3	Knowle	30	19	8	3	65	23	+42	65	
4	Cadbury Athletic	30	17	9	4	76	38	+38	60	
5	Alcester Town	30	17	6	7	61	35	+26	57	
6	Kenilworth Sporting	29	13	9	7	58	42	+16	48	Resigned from the league
7	Hampton	30	12	6	12	54	47	+7	42	
8	Fairfield Villa	30	12	4	14	47	47	0	40	
9	Bolehall Swifts	30	12	1	17	47	65	−18	37	
10	Coventry Alvis	30	10	6	14	62	74	−12	36	
11	Inkberrow	30	8	9	13	56	67	−11	33	
12	Earlswood Town	30	7	11	12	41	58	−17	32	
13	Redditch Borough	29	7	6	16	36	66	−30	27	
14	Birmingham United	30	7	5	18	41	69	−28	25 (Note: Birmingham United 1 point deducted.)	
15	Lane Head	30	7	2	21	27	69	−42	23	
16	Boldmere Sports & Social Falcon	30	2	3	25	29	102	−73	9	Relegated to Division Three

Source: FA Full-Time

== Division Three ==
Midland Football League Division Three
- Season: 2022–23
- Champions: Coventrians
- Promoted: Coventrians; Central Ajax

Division Three featured 11 clubs which competed in the division last season, along with 4 new club:

- Wake Green Amateur, joined from the Birmingham & District League
- Solihull Sporting
- Coventry Dunlop, joined from the Coventry Alliance
- Sutton Rangers

=== League table ===
Pos	Team	Pld	W	D	L	GF	GA	GD	Pts	Promotion or relegation
1	Coventrians	22	17	1	4	71	27	+44	52	Promoted to Division Two
2	Central Ajax	22	15	4	3	68	27	+41	49	Promoted to Division Two
3	AFC Solihull	22	14	3	5	61	35	+26	45	
4	Balsall and Berkswell	22	12	5	5	52	19	+33	41	
5	Wake Green Amateur	22	12	3	7	57	41	+16	39	
6	DSC United	22	11	5	6	42	34	+8	38	
7	AFC Birmingham	22	11	3	8	65	34	+31	36	
8	Solihull Sporting	22	6	4	12	41	45	−4	22	
9	Leamington Hibs	22	5	4	13	30	53	−23	19	
10	Castle Vale Town	22	4	3	15	40	60	−20	15	
11	Continental Star	22	4	3	15	29	79	−50	15	
12	Birmingham Tigers	22	1	2	19	18	120	−102	5	
13	Coventry Dunlop	0	0	0	0	0	0	0	0	Club folded, record expunged
14	Enville Athletic	0	0	0	0	0	0	0	0	Club folded, record expunged
15	Sutton Rangers	0	0	0	0	0	0	0	0	Club folded, record expunged

Source: FA Full-Time
Rules for classification: 1) points; 2) goal difference; 3) number of goals scored.
