= 2007–08 West Midlands (Regional) League =

The 2007–08 West Midlands (Regional) League season was the 108th in the history of the West Midlands (Regional) League, an English association football competition for semi-professional and amateur teams based in the West Midlands county, Shropshire, Herefordshire, Worcestershire and southern Staffordshire. It has three divisions, the highest of which is the Premier Division, which sits at step 6 of the National League System, or the tenth level of the overall English football league system.

== Premier Division ==
West Midlands League Premier Division
- Season: 2007–08
- Champions: Bridgnorth Town
- Promoted: Bridgnorth Town
- Matches: 420
- Goals: 1,406 (3.35 per match)

The Premier Division featured 19 clubs which competed in the division last season, along with two new clubs, promoted from Division One:

- AFC Wulfrunians
- Darlaston Town

Also, Brierley & Hagley merged with Withymoor Colts to form Brierley Hill & Withymoor.

=== League table ===
Pos	Team	Pld	W	D	L	GF	GA	GD	Pts	Promotion or relegation
1	Bridgnorth Town	40	31	4	5	97	33	+64	97	Promoted to the Midland Football Alliance
2	Shawbury United	40	21	9	10	86	59	+27	72	
3	Bewdley Town	40	23	6	11	83	57	+26	72 (Note: Bewdley Town deducted 3 points)	
4	Wednesfield	40	20	9	11	68	51	+17	69	
5	Dudley Town	40	20	9	11	56	48	+8	69	
6	AFC Wulfrunians	40	19	10	11	83	43	+40	67	
7	Ellesmere Rangers	40	20	7	13	71	52	+19	67	
8	Dudley Sports	40	19	12	9	64	46	+18	66 (Note: Dudley Sports deducted 3 points)	
9	Darlaston Town	40	17	12	11	71	57	+14	63	
10	Lye Town	40	18	8	14	80	58	+22	62	
11	Tividale	40	13	12	15	72	65	+7	51	
12	Pelsall Villa	40	14	9	17	67	71	−4	51	
13	Wellington	40	13	11	16	63	79	−16	50	
14	Ludlow Town	40	13	11	16	50	73	−23	50	
15	Goodrich	40	13	6	21	72	83	−11	45	
16	Gornal Athletic	40	10	12	18	46	63	−17	42	
17	Brierley Hill & Withymoor	40	12	5	23	62	89	−27	41	Club folded
18	Wolverhampton Casuals	40	8	15	17	58	80	−22	38 (Note: Wolverhampton Casuals deducted 1 point)	
19	Ledbury Town	40	10	3	27	56	100	−44	33	
20	Bromyard Town	40	8	7	25	46	87	−41	31	
21	Bustleholme	40	7	5	28	55	112	−57	26	

Source: fchd
Rules for classification: 1) points; 2) goal difference; 3) number of goals scored.
