= 2015–16 West Midlands (Regional) League =

The 2015–16 West Midlands (Regional) League season was the 116th in the history of the West Midlands (Regional) League, an English association football competition for semi-professional and amateur teams based in the West Midlands county, Shropshire, Herefordshire, Worcestershire and southern Staffordshire. It has three divisions, the highest of which is the Premier Division, which sits at step 6 of the National League System, or the tenth level of the overall English football league system.

== Premier Division ==
West Midlands League Premier Division
- Season: 2015–16
- Champions: Shawbury United
- Promoted: Shawbury United
- Relegated: Bromyard Town; Tipton Town
- Matches: 462
- Goals: 1,857 (4.02 per match)

The Premier Division featured 19 clubs which competed in the division last season, along with three new clubs:

- Bromyard Town, promoted from Division One
- Stone Old Alleynians, promoted from Division One
- Tipton Town, relegated from the Midland League

=== League table ===
Pos	Team	Pld	W	D	L	GF	GA	GD	Pts	Promotion or relegation
1	Shawbury United	42	29	7	6	140	46	+94	94	Promoted to the Midland League
2	A.F.C. Bridgnorth	42	29	6	7	123	43	+80	93	
3	Malvern Town	42	25	3	14	114	72	+42	78	
4	Wolverhampton Sporting Community	42	23	8	11	130	69	+61	77	
5	Haughmond	42	22	10	10	111	69	+42	76	
6	Wolverhampton Casuals	42	22	8	12	111	81	+30	74	
7	Dudley Sports	42	21	11	10	82	63	+19	74	
8	Cradley Town	42	20	10	12	89	63	+26	70	
9	Pegasus Juniors	42	21	3	18	87	77	+10	66	
10	Ellesmere Rangers	42	19	8	15	92	72	+20	65	
11	Wellington	42	16	13	13	86	67	+19	61	
12	Smethwick Rangers	42	18	7	17	89	99	−10	61	
13	Dudley Town	42	17	10	15	66	82	−16	61	
14	Stone Old Alleynians	42	18	4	20	74	85	−11	58	
15	Black Country Rangers	42	15	11	16	73	65	+8	56	
16	Bewdley Town	42	16	8	18	72	78	−6	56	
17	Gornal Athletic	42	12	5	25	67	94	−27	41	
18	Willenhall Town	42	10	7	25	63	110	−47	37	
19	Wellington Amateurs	42	9	7	26	46	115	−69	34	
20	Bilston Town	42	8	9	25	50	105	−55	33	
21	Bromyard Town	42	9	5	28	66	134	−68	32	Relegated to Division One
22	Tipton Town	42	0	6	36	26	168	−142	6	Relegated to Division One

Source: fchd
Rules for classification: 1) points; 2) goal difference; 3) number of goals scored.

=== Results ===
Home \ Away	BRI	BEW	BIL	BLA	BRO	CRA	DUD	DUT	ELL	GOR	HAU	MAL	PEJ	SHA	SME	STO	TIP	WEH	WEL	WIL	WOC	WSC
A.F.C. Bridgnorth		0–2	4–2	10–1	0–0	1–0	3–3	1–0	1–0	3–1	2–0	1–0	7–1	0–0	2–2	3–2	3–1	1–0	5–0	6–1	5–1	2–1
Bewdley Town	0–4		3–0	1–1	0–0	2–1	0–2	1–0	2–2	1–2	2–2	1–4	3–2	2–3	1–4	1–2	4–1	2–2	3–1	1–4	2–3	3–4
Bilston Town	0–5	0–6		2–2	0–0	3–0	3–2	2–2	0–2	0–3	4–1	1–2	1–4	2–4	0–1	2–1	2–1	0–0	1–1	1–2	1–4	1–1
Black Country Rangers	1–4	2–0	5–0		5–1	1–1	0–4	1–3	0–1	4–0	0–1	0–2	1–0	0–1	2–1	0–0	5–1	1–2	0–1	2–3	4–2	1–6
Bromyard Town	0–6	0–2	6–3	3–4		3–3	1–2	3–2	1–6	3–1	0–5	3–6	1–7	0–2	2–4	0–1	5–3	1–5	4–0	1–2	0–4	0–1
Cradley Town	1–2	4–1	2–2	0–3	4–0		5–1	2–2	3–0	2–2	1–1	1–2	4–0	1–0	0–2	3–4	3–0	3–2	7–1	2–1	3–2	3–1
Dudley Sports	3–1	0–0	4–1	0–2	5–4	0–0		1–0	1–2	2–2	3–1	2–1	2–0	2–1	5–1	3–4	5–0	1–1	2–1	4–5	0–3	0–3
Dudley Town	0–4	1–4	2–1	2–2	2–1	3–2	1–1		1–0	2–1	1–2	3–3	2–1	0–3	1–2	1–1	3–0	0–2	3–0	2–1	2–2	0–8
Ellesmere Rangers	0–4	1–4	8–0	4–1	0–0	1–1	2–2	2–3		2–2	0–3	1–4	1–3	1–2	2–1	5–0	11–1	3–3	4–1	1–0	3–2	2–2
Gornal Athletic	1–0	0–1	1–3	3–1	4–0	1–2	0–3	2–1	1–2		2–4	2–3	0–1	2–4	3–3	1–4	5–1	2–2	5–3	4–1	3–1	0–2
Haughmond	1–3	1–1	1–1	3–3	1–2	3–1	0–0	8–1	2–0	3–0		1–3	4–2	0–2	5–0	5–1	6–0	2–2	1–1	1–0	2–5	5–4
Malvern Town	4–2	4–1	1–0	1–1	5–2	0–4	0–1	6–3	3–0	5–0	0–3		1–2	0–1	6–0	4–3	6–0	2–1	2–0	2–1	3–4	1–1
Pegasus Juniors	3–0	1–1	4–2	0–4	8–1	1–2	3–1	1–2	2–1	2–1	1–2	2–1		1–0	2–0	1–0	5–2	1–4	2–1	6–1	2–2	4–2
Shawbury United	1–1	5–0	3–0	0–0	3–4	7–0	6–0	2–2	5–1	3–1	4–4	5–2	1–2		11–1	5–3	8–0	2–0	5–0	3–2	5–0	6–0
Smethwick Rangers	3–1	3–2	0–0	0–5	4–2	1–2	0–1	1–3	2–4	3–1	3–4	3–1	4–2	2–2		0–1	6–0	3–1	2–0	3–1	3–3	2–1
Stone Old Alleynians	1–4	1–3	2–1	1–0	0–1	1–2	1–2	3–0	1–2	2–1	2–4	4–5	3–0	1–2	3–2		4–2	2–1	3–1	2–1	0–1	0–5
Tipton Town	0–6	0–2	0–3	0–0	0–3	0–5	0–0	0–1	0–3	0–2	0–5	0–4	0–3	1–7	1–3	1–1		3–6	1–3	1–1	0–0	0–5
Wellington	3–3	2–1	1–0	0–3	2–1	1–1	2–2	1–2	1–1	2–1	4–1	2–3	3–0	2–3	3–0	4–1	1–1		1–2	4–1	3–2	2–2
Wellington Amateurs	0–2	1–3	3–0	1–2	0–0	1–4	0–4	1–1	3–2	0–4	0–6	2–8	2–1	0–4	3–3	1–1	2–1	1–5		1–0	0–4	0–2
Willenhall Town	0–7	1–2	1–4	2–2	3–1	1–1	0–2	2–2	0–2	2–0	2–2	2–0	0–0	3–7	2–6	0–2	4–3	3–2	0–3		2–4	3–3
Wolverhampton Casuals	3–0	4–1	2–1	5–0	5–2	2–3	2–3	1–2	1–3	7–0	0–3	2–1	3–2	2–1	2–2	3–2	7–0	0–0	5–2	3–2		3–2
Wolverhampton Sporting Community	0–4	3–0	8–0	3–0	4–3	1–0	1–1	0–2	3–4	4–0	6–2	4–3	4–2	1–1	6–3	2–3	10–0	3–1	4–0	5–0	2–2	

Source: Results at FA Full-Time
Legend: Blue = home team win; Yellow = draw; Red = away team win.
