= 2008–09 Midland Football Alliance =

Midland Football Alliance
- Season: 2008–09
- Champions: Market Drayton Town
- Promoted: Market Drayton Town
- Relegated: Racing Club Warwick; Oldbury United
- Matches: 462
- Goals: 1,561 (3.38 per match)

The 2008–09 Midland Football Alliance season was the 15th in the history of Midland Football Alliance, a football competition in England.

== Clubs and League table ==
The league featured 19 clubs from the previous season, along with three new clubs:

- Bridgnorth Town, promoted from the West Midlands (Regional) League
- Coleshill Town, promoted from the Midland Football Combination
- Highgate United, promoted from the Midland Football Combination

=== League Table ===
Pos	Team	Pld	W	D	L	GF	GA	GD	Pts	Promotion or relegation
1	Market Drayton Town	42	31	6	5	111	31	+80	99	Promoted to the Northern Premier League Division One South
2	Barwell	42	27	10	5	91	36	+55	91	
3	Coalville Town	42	25	7	10	88	51	+37	82	
4	Boldmere St. Michaels	42	25	6	11	98	54	+44	81	
5	Tipton Town	42	23	9	10	82	44	+38	78	
6	Stratford Town	42	21	11	10	92	65	+27	74	
7	Coventry Sphinx	42	23	5	14	96	78	+18	74	
8	Shifnal Town	42	20	10	12	73	56	+17	67 (Note: Shifnal Town deducted 3 points.)	
9	Causeway United	42	19	7	16	62	47	+15	64	
10	Alvechurch	42	16	15	11	73	55	+18	63	
11	Coleshill Town	42	18	9	15	70	59	+11	63	
12	Bridgnorth Town	42	17	8	17	76	85	−9	59	
13	Highgate United	42	15	9	18	67	75	−8	54	
14	Studley	42	15	6	21	55	77	−22	51	
15	Friar Lane & Epworth	42	14	9	19	70	96	−26	51	
16	Cradley Town	42	14	8	20	69	81	−12	50	
17	Westfields	42	13	10	19	75	79	−4	49	
18	Biddulph Victoria	42	12	8	22	57	102	−45	44	
19	Oadby Town	42	9	10	23	43	73	−30	37	
20	Rocester	42	8	9	25	49	88	−39	33	
21	Racing Club Warwick	42	4	6	32	31	131	−100	18	Relegated to the Midland Football Combination
22	Oldbury United	42	1	6	35	33	98	−65	8 (Note: Oldbury United deducted 1 point.)	Relegated to the West Midlands (Regional) League

Source: fchd
Rules for classification: 1) points; 2) goal difference; 3) number of goals scored.
