= 2019–20 West Midlands (Regional) League =

The 2019–20 West Midlands (Regional) League season was the 120th in the history of the West Midlands (Regional) League (WMRL), a football competition in England which was formed in 1889. The league operates three divisions: the Premier Division, see below, at level 10 in the English football league system, Division One at level 11, and Division Two. The Premier Division is one of three divisions which feed into the Midland League Premier Division, the other two being the East Midlands Counties League and the Midland League's own Division One.

The allocations for Steps 1 to 6 for season 2019–20 were announced by the FA on 19 May. These were subject to appeal, and the West Midland (Regional) League's constitution was subject to ratification at the league's AGM on 3 June.

As a result of the COVID-19 pandemic, this season's competition was formally abandoned on 26 March 2020, with all results from the season being expunged, and no promotion or relegation taking place to, from, or within the competition. On 30 March 2020, sixty-six non-league clubs sent an open letter to the Football Association requesting that they reconsider their decision.

== Premier Division ==
West Midlands League Premier Division
- Season: 2019–20
- Matches: 217
- Goals: 820 (3.78 per match)

The Premier Division featured 14 clubs which competed in the division last season, along with four new clubs:

- Darlaston Town (1874), promoted from Division One
- Littleton, transferred from Midland League Division One
- Wolverhampton Sporting Community, relegated from Midland League Premier Division
- Worcester Raiders, promoted from Division One

=== League table ===
Pos	Team	Pld	W	D	L	GF	GA	GD	Pts
1	Shifnal Town	22	20	0	2	80	19	+61	60
2	Bewdley Town	24	18	0	6	67	33	+34	54
3	Dudley Town	27	16	4	7	69	46	+23	52
4	Wolverhampton Casuals	22	13	7	2	43	9	+34	46
5	Bilston Town	28	15	1	12	67	54	+13	46
6	Pershore Town	27	11	6	10	56	47	+9	39
7	Black Country Rangers	21	11	5	5	42	28	+14	38
8	Wednesfield	22	11	2	9	31	31	0	35
9	Darlaston Town (1874)	28	10	5	13	51	54	−3	35
10	Littleton	22	10	3	9	43	32	+11	33
11	Worcester Raiders	23	9	4	10	52	51	+1	31
12	AFC Bridgnorth	25	8	5	12	37	52	−15	29
13	Wolverhampton Sporting Community	23	7	7	9	36	39	−3	28
14	Smethwick Rangers	23	7	4	12	33	49	−16	25
15	Shawbury United	22	7	4	11	27	44	−17	25
16	Wem Town	27	6	2	19	37	87	−50	20
17	Dudley Sports	24	3	3	18	20	73	−53	12
18	Cradley Town	24	3	2	19	29	72	−43	11

Updated to match(es) played on 10 March 2020. Source: FA Full-Time
Rules for classification: 1) Points; 2) Goal difference; 3) Number of goals scored; 4) Number of matches won; 5) Head-to-head results
