= 2009–10 West Midlands (Regional) League =

The 2009–10 West Midlands (Regional) League season was the 110th in the history of the West Midlands (Regional) League, an English association football competition for semi-professional and amateur teams based in the West Midlands county, Shropshire, Herefordshire, Worcestershire and southern Staffordshire. It has three divisions, the highest of which is the Premier Division, which sits at step 6 of the National League System, or the tenth level of the overall English football league system.

== Premier Division ==
West Midlands League Premier Division
- Season: 2009–10
- Champions: Ellesmere Rangers
- Promoted: Ellesmere Rangers
- Matches: 420
- Goals: 1,551 (3.69 per match)

The Premier Division featured 20 clubs which competed in the division last season, along with one new club:

- Oldbury Athletic, transferred from the Midland Football Combination

=== League table ===
Pos	Team	Pld	W	D	L	GF	GA	GD	Pts	Promotion or relegation
1	Ellesmere Rangers	40	30	5	5	98	29	+69	95	Promoted to the Midland Football Alliance
2	Bloxwich United	40	30	4	6	128	46	+82	94	
3	AFC Wulfrunians	40	28	4	8	83	31	+52	88	
4	Bustleholme	40	26	7	7	93	42	+51	85	
5	Dudley Town	40	24	6	10	86	52	+34	78	
6	Wellington	40	21	8	11	104	73	+31	71	
7	Tividale	40	22	5	13	76	61	+15	71	
8	Oldbury Athletic	40	23	1	16	89	67	+22	70	Club folded
9	Ledbury Town	40	18	8	14	78	77	+1	62	Resigned from the league
10	Ludlow Town	40	19	4	17	92	74	+18	61	Club folded
11	Wednesfield	40	16	7	17	85	77	+8	55	
12	Bewdley Town	40	16	5	19	78	82	−4	53	
13	Darlaston Town	40	13	3	24	57	82	−25	42	
14	Bromyard Town	40	11	5	24	54	108	−54	38	
15	Dudley Sports	40	10	7	23	38	87	−49	37	
16	Wolverhampton Casuals	40	9	10	21	66	98	−32	36 (Note: Wolverhampton Casuals deducted 1 point)	
17	Gornal Athletic	40	9	8	23	47	81	−34	35	
18	Goodrich	40	9	8	23	50	89	−39	35	
19	Lye Town	40	9	5	26	49	106	−57	32	
20	Heath Town Rangers	40	10	4	26	53	98	−45	31 (Note: Heath Town Rangers deducted 3 points)	
21	Shawbury United	40	8	4	28	47	91	−44	28	

Source: fchd
Rules for classification: 1) points; 2) goal difference; 3) number of goals scored.
