= 2009–10 Midland Football Alliance =

Midland Football Alliance
- Season: 2009–10
- Champions: Barwell
- Promoted: Barwell
- Relegated: Shifnal Town; Cradley Town
- Matches: 461
- Goals: 1,550 (3.36 per match)

The 2009–10 Midland Football Alliance season was the 16th in the history of Midland Football Alliance, a football competition in England.

== Clubs and League table ==
The league featured 19 clubs from the previous season, along with three new clubs:

- Kirby Muxloe, promoted from the East Midlands Counties League
- Loughborough University, promoted from the Midland Football Combination
- Malvern Town, relegated from the Southern Football League

=== League Table ===
Pos	Team	Pld	W	D	L	GF	GA	GD	Pts	Promotion or relegation
1	Barwell	42	36	6	0	125	18	+107	114	Promoted to the Northern Premier League Division One South
2	Coalville Town	42	31	3	8	106	43	+63	96	
3	Stratford Town	42	26	4	12	89	50	+39	82	
4	Tipton Town	42	23	13	6	65	28	+37	82	
5	Westfields	42	23	7	12	82	55	+27	76	
6	Boldmere St. Michaels	42	21	7	14	78	51	+27	70	
7	Alvechurch	42	19	9	14	86	66	+20	66	
8	Coleshill Town	41	18	9	14	77	55	+22	63	
9	Coventry Sphinx	42	18	8	16	89	69	+20	62	
10	Kirby Muxloe	42	17	11	14	81	62	+19	62	
11	Studley	42	18	8	16	63	62	+1	62	
12	Causeway United	42	17	8	17	61	54	+7	59	
13	Loughborough University	42	16	9	17	51	48	+3	57	
14	Oadby Town	42	16	7	19	70	77	−7	55	
15	Friar Lane & Epworth	41	15	5	21	75	90	−15	50	
16	Rocester	42	14	6	22	65	79	−14	48	
17	Biddulph Victoria	42	12	12	18	56	76	−20	48	
18	Highgate United	42	11	8	23	57	95	−38	41	
19	Malvern Town	42	9	8	25	64	96	−32	35	
20	Bridgnorth Town	42	9	7	26	42	93	−51	34	
21	Shifnal Town	42	7	8	27	39	105	−66	29	Relegated to the West Midlands (Regional) League
22	Cradley Town	42	0	7	35	29	178	−149	7	Relegated to the West Midlands (Regional) League

Source: fchd
Rules for classification: 1) points; 2) goal difference; 3) number of goals scored.
