= List of football clubs in the West Midlands =

This is a list of football clubs based in West Midlands County. They are sorted by founding date, as well as by which league they play in the English football league system as of the 2025–26 season.

Locations of all the football clubs in the West Midlands from levels 1–8.

== List by founding date ==
The oldest football clubs in the West Midlands are listed below.

Club	Original name	Founding date	Ref.
Aston Villa F.C.		1874	
Birmingham City F.C.	Small Heath Alliance	1875	
Stourbridge F.C.	Stourbridge Standard	1876	
Halesowen Town F.C.	Halesowen Football Club	1877	
Wolverhampton Wanderers F.C.	St. Luke's FC	1877	
West Bromwich Albion F.C.		1878	
Coventry City F.C.	Singers F.C.	1883	
Shrewsbury Town F.C.		1886	
Walsall F.C.	Walsall Town Swifts	1888	
Dudley Town F.C.		1888	
Redditch United F.C.	Redditch	1891	

== Levels 1–4 ==
These West Midlands clubs play in fully professional leagues, comprising levels 1–4 of the English football league system: the Premier League and the English Football League.

Club	Home Ground	City/Borough	League	Level
Aston Villa	Villa Park	Birmingham	Premier League	1
Birmingham City	St Andrew's	Birmingham	EFL Championship	2
Coventry City	Coventry Building Society Arena	Coventry	Premier League	1
Walsall	Bescot Stadium	Walsall	EFL League Two	4
West Bromwich Albion	The Hawthorns	West Bromwich, Sandwell	EFL Championship	2
Wolverhampton Wanderers	Molineux	Wolverhampton	EFL Championship	2

== Levels 5–8 ==
These West Midlands clubs play in semi-pro leagues which are at a level in the English football league system that grants eligibility to enter the FA Trophy, comprising levels 5–8 of the system: the National League and the Southern League.

Club	Home Ground	City/Borough	League	Level
Boldmere St. Michaels	Boldmere Community Stadium	Boldmere	Northern Premier League Division One Midlands	8
Coventry Sphinx	Sphinx Drive	Coventry	Northern Premier League Division One Midlands	8
Darlaston Town 1874	Bentley Sports Pavilion	Darlaston	Northern Premier League Division One West	8
Halesowen Town	The Grove	Dudley	Southern League Premier Division Central	7
Rushall Olympic	Dales Lane	Walsall	National League North	6
Solihull Moors	ARMCO Arena	Solihull	National League Premier	5
Sporting Khalsa	Aspray Arena	Willenhall	Northern Premier League Division One West	8
Stourbridge	War Memorial Athletic Ground	Dudley	Southern League Premier Division Central	7
Sutton Coldfield Town	Coles Lane	Sutton Coldfield	Northern Premier League Division One Midlands	8
