= 1989–90 West Midlands (Regional) League =

The 1989–90 West Midlands (Regional) League season was the 90th in the history of the West Midlands (Regional) League, an English association football competition for semi-professional and amateur teams based in the West Midlands county, Shropshire, Herefordshire, Worcestershire and southern Staffordshire.

== Premier Division ==
West Midlands League Premier Division
- Season: 1989–90
- Champions: Hinckley Town
- Promoted: Hinckley Town
- Matches: 420
- Goals: 1,254 (2.99 per match)

The Premier Division featured 21 clubs which competed in the division last season, no new clubs joined the division this season:

Also, Wednesfield Social changed name to Wednesfield.

=== League table ===
Pos	Team	Pld	W	D	L	GF	GA	GD	Pts	Promotion or relegation
1	Hinckley Town	40	24	10	6	87	30	+57	82	Promoted to the Southern League
2	Rocester	40	25	7	8	85	44	+41	82	
3	Gresley Rovers	40	24	8	8	89	42	+47	80	
4	Blakenall	40	24	5	11	78	52	+26	77	
5	Lye Town	40	22	10	8	68	35	+33	76	
6	Hinckley Athletic	40	18	10	12	58	47	+11	64	
7	Wednesfield	40	16	14	10	60	44	+16	62	
8	Oldbury United	40	18	8	14	62	60	+2	62	
9	Halesowen Harriers	40	17	10	13	79	55	+24	61	
10	Chasetown	40	16	12	12	57	36	+21	60	
11	Paget Rangers	40	18	6	16	74	63	+11	60	
12	Harrisons	40	15	11	14	55	54	+1	56	Resigned from the league
13	Malvern Town	40	15	10	15	62	62	0	55	
14	Rushall Olympic	40	15	5	20	65	56	+9	50	
15	Stourport Swifts	40	12	10	18	40	59	−19	46	
16	Wolverhampton Casuals	40	10	9	21	41	80	−39	39	
17	Westfields	40	10	7	23	44	84	−40	37	
18	Oldswinford	40	10	5	25	39	82	−43	35	
19	Tividale	40	8	8	24	42	80	−38	32	
20	Millfields	40	6	9	25	39	90	−51	27	
21	Tipton Town	40	4	12	24	30	99	−69	24	

Source: nonleaguematters
Rules for classification: 1) points; 2) goal difference; 3) number of goals scored.
