= Worcestershire Senior Urn =

The Worcestershire Senior Urn (officially The Worcestershire Football Association Senior Invitation Urn) is a football competition for Worcestershire County FA club teams, organized by the Worcestershire County Football Association. It began in the 1973–74 season with Malvern Town taking the honours in the first final.

The Senior Urn is the less senior of the county's two main cups, and at present entry is restricted to those clubs which are affiliated to the County FA and compete in the highest division of the Midland Football Alliance, West Midlands (Regional) League, Midland Football Combination and Hellenic League. Clubs from higher leagues compete in the Worcestershire Senior Cup.

== Winners ==
The winners of the Urn have been as follows:

- 1973–74 Malvern Town
- 1974–75 Malvern Town
- 1975–76 Malvern Town
- 1976–77 Evesham United
- 1977–78 Evesham United
- 1978–79 Malvern Town
- 1979–80 Oldswinford
- 1980–81 Bromsgrove Rovers
- 1981–82 Ledbury Town
- 1982–83 Oldswinford
- 1983–84 Malvern Town
- 1984–85 West Midlands Police
- 1985–86 Pegasus Juniors
- 1986–87 Oldbury United
- 1987–88 Kings Heath
- 1988–89 Kidderminster Harriers Reserves
- 1989–90 Malvern Town
- 1990–91 West Midlands Police
- 1991–92 West Midlands Police
- 1992–93 Stourport Swifts
- 1993–94 Stourport Swifts
- 1994–95 Stourport Swifts
- 1995–96 Pershore Town
- 1996–97 Kings Heath
- 1997–98 Stourport Swifts
- 1998–99 Kings Norton Town
- 1999–00 Malvern Town
- 2000–01 Studley
- 2001–02 Studley
- 2002–03 Studley
- 2003–04 Alvechurch
- 2004–05 Alvechurch
- 2005–06 Worcester City Reserves
- 2006–07 Barnt Green Spartak
- 2007–08 Alvechurch
- 2008–09 Bewdley Town
- 2009–10 Alvechurch
- 2010–11 Bewdley Town
- 2011–12 Bewdley Town
- 2012–13 Alvechurch
- 2013–14 Lye Town
- 2014–15 Malvern Town
- 2015–16 Alvechurch
- 2016–17 Bromsgrove Sporting
- 2017-18 Bromsgrove Sporting
