= 2020–21 West Midlands (Regional) League =

The 2020–21 West Midlands (Regional) League season was the 121st in the history of the West Midlands (Regional) League (WMRL), a football competition in England which was formed in 1889. The league operated three divisions for the last time: the Premier Division, see below, at level 10 in the English football league system, Division One at level 11, and Division Two. The Premier Division was one of three divisions which fed into the Midland Football League Premier Division, the other two being the East Midlands Counties League and the Midland League's own Division One.

The allocations for Steps 5 and 6 for season 2020–21 were announced by the FA on 21 July, and were subject to appeal. The league season was subsequently abandoned on 24 February 2021.

== Promotions and restructuring ==
The scheduled restructuring of non-League football took place at the end of the season, with new divisions added to the Combined Counties and United Counties leagues at Step 5 for 2021-22, along with new a division in the Northern Premier League at Step 4. Promotions from Steps 6 to 5 were based on points per game across all matches over the two cancelled seasons (2019-20 and 2020-21), while teams were promoted into Step 6 on the basis of a subjective application process. The Premier Division disbanded and therefore the WMRL lost its place at Step 6 or level 10, becoming a National League System county feeder, after most of its remaining clubs were assigned to the Hellenic and Midland leagues. The league was reduced to two regional divisions at levels 11-12.

== Premier Division ==
West Midlands League Premier Division
- Season: 2020–21
- Matches: 60
- Goals: 249 (4.15 per match)

The Premier Division for the final time comprised 18 teams, the same set of teams which competed in the previous season's aborted competition.

=== League table ===
Pos	Team	Pld	W	D	L	GF	GA	GD	Pts	Promotion or qualification
1	Shifnal Town	8	7	0	1	20	4	+16	21	Promoted to the Midland League Premier Division (Note: Promoted based on points per game calculations from 2019–20 and 2020–21 seasons combined.)
2	Worcester Raiders	7	6	1	0	25	8	+17	19	Transferred to Hellenic League Division One
3	Shawbury United	9	5	2	2	22	15	+7	17	Transferred to Midland League Division One
4	Littleton	7	5	1	1	20	7	+13	16	Transferred to Hellenic League Division One
5	Bilston Town	7	5	1	1	17	7	+10	16	Transferred to Midland League Division One
6	Wolverhampton Casuals	9	4	1	4	16	21	−5	13	Promoted to the Midland League Premier Division
7	Wolverhampton Sporting Community	6	3	1	2	13	12	+1	10	Transferred to Midland League Division One
8	Wednesfield	6	3	0	3	16	14	+2	9	Transferred to Midland League Division One
9	Dudley Town	4	2	1	1	9	3	+6	7	Transferred to Midland League Division One
10	Black Country Rangers	3	2	1	0	7	2	+5	7	Transferred to Midland League Division One
11	Pershore Town	5	1	3	1	12	13	−1	6	Transferred to Hellenic League Division One
12	Cradley Town	7	2	0	5	12	17	−5	6	Transferred to Midland League Division One
13	Darlaston Town (1874)	8	2	0	6	7	20	−13	6	Transferred to Midland League Division One
14	Dudley Sports	6	1	2	3	11	10	+1	5	Transferred to Midland League Division One
15	AFC Bridgnorth	8	1	2	5	12	22	−10	5	Transferred to Midland League Division One
16	Bewdley Town	4	1	1	2	14	15	−1	4	Promoted to the Midland League Premier Division
17	Wem Town	9	1	1	7	10	30	−20	4	Demoted to the Shropshire County League (Note: Initially transferred to, then resigned from, the North West Counties League.)
18	Smethwick Rangers	7	0	0	7	6	29	−23	0	Transferred to Midland League Division One

Source: FA Full-Time
Rules for classification: 1) points; 2) goal difference; 3) number of goals scored; 4) number of matches won; 5) head-to-head results
