= Goodrich F.C. =

Coordinates: 52°37′56.94″N 2°07′51.79″W

Goodrich
- Full name: Goodrich Football Club
- Founded: 1995 (as Lucas Flight Controls)
- Dissolved: 2012
- Ground: Goodrich Sports Ground; Fordhouses; Wolverhampton; West Midlands; WV10 7EH
- League: West Midlands (Regional) League; Premier Division
- 2011–12: West Midlands (Regional) League; Premier Division, 9th
Home colours	Away colours

Goodrich F.C. was a football club based in Wolverhampton, West Midlands, England. The team joined the West Midlands (Regional) League Division One North in 1997, having emerged from local works football. From 2004 until 2012 the team played in the West Midlands (Regional) League Premier Division.

== History ==
The Goodrich club had links to Aero Lucas FC, who played in the West Midland (Regional) League between 1983 and 1989, and fielded a second team who played in the Wolverhampton Works League. When the first team dropped out of the West Midlands League in 1989, the second team took over, re-forming the club in 1995 as Lucas Flight Controls. In 2001 the club changed its name to Lucas Sports (Wolverhampton) before settling on Goodrich in 2003.

Having originally joined the West Midlands League in 1997, in their first season as Goodrich, the club finished third in Division One (North) and were beaten finalists in the League Cup, before winning the title to gain promotion into the Premier Division the following season.

During the course of the 2004–05 season, Goodrich ground-shared with local rivals Wednesfield while improvements were carried out to get their own ground and facilities up to the required Premier Division standard.

After completion of the work, the club returned to the Goodrich Sports Ground for the 2005–06 campaign under new joint managers Martin Hughes and Steve Woodcock, who replaced Dean Parkes, who resigned after ten years in charge.

Goodrich resigned from the West Midlands (Regional) League in May 2012, citing costs as the reason for their resignation.

== Youth team ==
In July 2011, Goodrich set up a youth team to compete in the Midlands Floodlit Youth League.

== Honours ==
- West Midlands (Regional) League
  - Division One champions 2003–04

== Club records ==
- Best league performance: 6th in West Midlands (Regional) League Premier Division – 2006–07
- Best FA Cup performance: Extra Preliminary Round – 2008–09, 2009–10
- Best FA Vase performance: Second Qualifying Round – 2007–08, 2009–10

== Sources ==
- Goodrich at the Football Club History Database
