= Darlaston Town 1874 F.C. =

English association football club

Coordinates: 52.580939°N 2.022489°W

Darlaston Town 1874
- Full name: Darlaston Town 1874 Football Club
- Nickname: The Citizens
- Founded: 1874; 2014 (continuation)
- Ground: Bentley Sports Pavilion, Darlaston
- Chairman: Neil Chambers
- Manager: Matty Lovatt
- League: Midland League Premier Division
- 2025–26: Northern Premier League Division One West, 22nd of 22 (relegated)
- Website: https://www.darlastontown1874fc.com/
Home colours	Away colours

Darlaston Town 1874 Football Club is an English association football club that represents the town of Darlaston, West Midlands. They are currently members of the Midland League Premier Division and play at the Bentley Sports Pavilion, Darlaston in the Metropolitan Borough of Walsall.

== History ==
The club was formed in 1874.

In 2014, the club was accepted into the West Midlands (Regional) League Division Two, two leagues below where the original club left off. In just their second season in the league, the club finished 3rd and level on points behind runners-up FC Stafford.

On 10 October 2015, the club attracted their highest league home gate when 105 spectators took in the visit of local neighbours Wednesfield.

The 2018–19 season saw the club go 20 league games unbeaten. In June 2019, the club were granted a place in the Premier Division for the first time in 6 years alongside 17 other clubs. Their first season back, however, was cut short when the majority of the English non-league pyramid seasons were abandoned due to the COVID-19 pandemic. At the end of the 2020–21 season the club was transferred to Division One of the Midland League when the Premier Division of the West Midlands (Regional) League lost its status as a step six division. At the conclusion of the 2023–24 season, the club beat Lichfield City in the play-off final to earn promotion to the Northern Premier League.

== Ground ==
The club play their home games at the Bentley Sports Pavilion, Darlaston in the Metropolitan Borough of Walsall. The ground is currently known as the Paycare Ground for sponsorship reasons.

== Records ==
=== Darlaston FC ===
- Best FA Cup performance: 4th qualifying round, 1977–78 (replay)
- Best FA Vase performance: 3rd qualifying round, 1972–73, 1973–74
- Best FA Vase performance: 2nd round, 1995–96

=== Darlaston Town FC ===
- Best FA Vase performance: 1st round, 2008–09

=== Darlaston Town 1874 FC ===
- Best FA Cup performance: 1st qualifying round, 2023–24 (replay), 2024–25 (replay)
- Best FA Trophy performance: 1st qualifying round, 2024–25, 2025–26
- Best FA Vase performance: 1st round, 2023–24
