= A.F.C. Bridgnorth =

Association football club in England

Coordinates: 52.539387°N 2.4285646°W

AFC Bridgnorth
- Full name: AFC Bridgnorth
- Nickname: Meadow Men
- Founded: 2013
- Ground: Crown Meadow
- Chairman: Mark Weale
- Manager: Steve Barrow and Dominic Heath
- League: North West Counties League Division One South
- 2025–26: Midland League Division One, 10th of 21 (transferred)
Home colours

Bridgnorth Town club badge

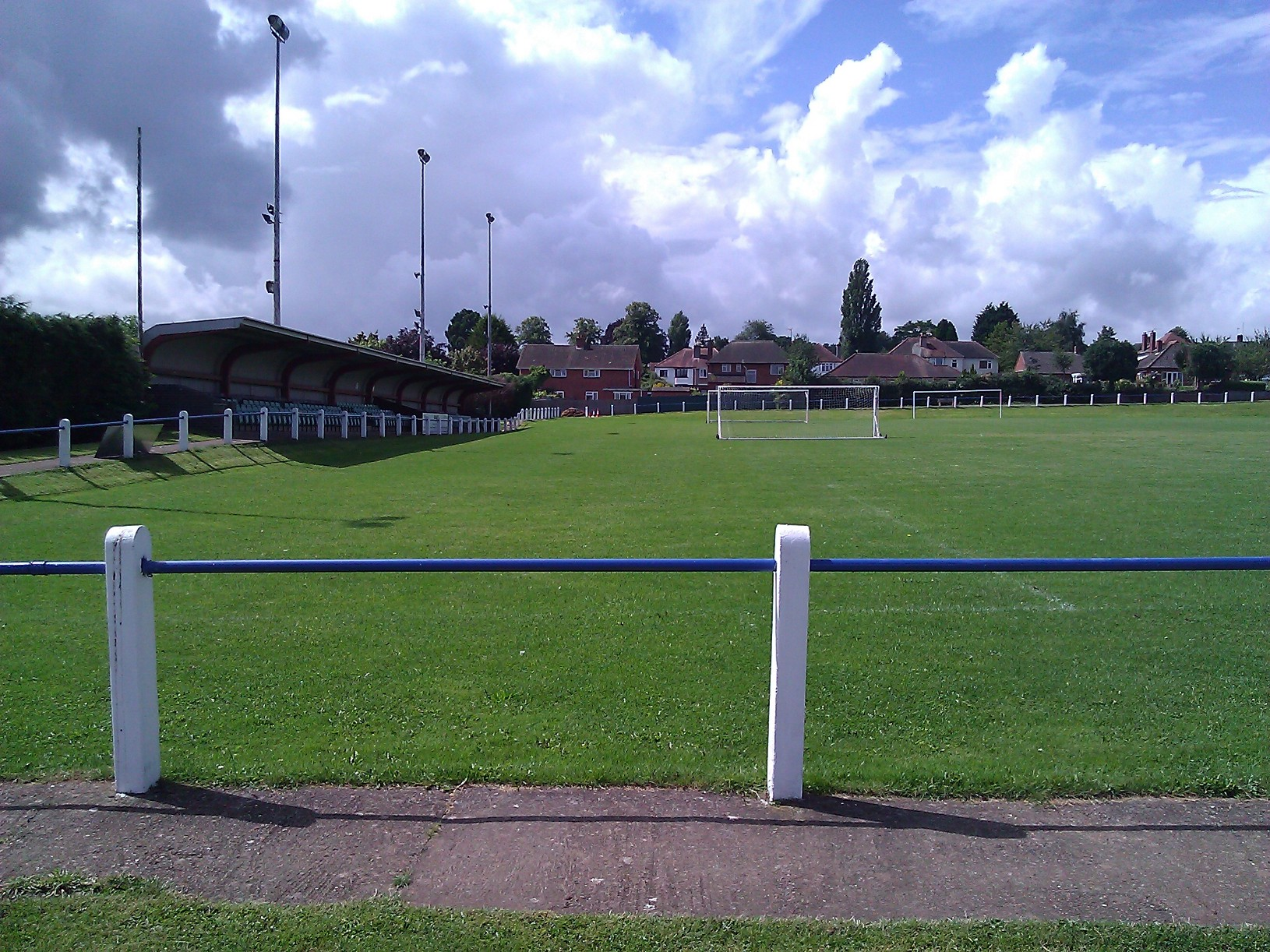
Crown Meadow

AFC Bridgnorth is a football club based in the town of Bridgnorth, Shropshire, England. They are currently members of the North West Counties League Division One South and play at Crown Meadow.

The club badge depicts the town hall in Bridgnorth's high town.

== History ==
=== Bridgnorth Town ===
A Bridgnorth Town existed in the 19th century, joining the Shropshire & District League in 1899. Another club by the same name was formed in July 1938 and joined the Worcestershire Combination for the 1938–39 season. However, the club folded after one season due to the outbreak of World War II.

After being refounded, in 1968 the club moved up to the Worcestershire Combination, which had just been renamed the Midland Combination, joining Division One. In 1970–71 the club became one of a small number of English clubs to win the Welsh Amateur Cup, beating Welshpool 2–1 in the final. They were runners-up in 1976–77 and won the league title in 1979–80. After finishing as runners-up again the following season, the club won a second Division One title in 1982–83, earning promotion to the Midland Division of the Southern League.

After thirteen seasons in the Southern League Midland Division, Bridgnorth finished bottom of the table in Southern League and were relegated to the Midland Alliance. They remained in the Alliance until finishing bottom of the league in 2004–05, after which they were relegated to the Premier Division of the Midland Combination. After a season in the Combination the club transferred laterally to the Premier Division of the West Midlands (Regional) League. They were league champions in 2007–08 and were promoted back to the Midland Alliance. Despite finishing seventh in the league in 2012–13, the club folded due to financial problems.

=== AFC Bridgnorth ===
After Bridgnorth Town folded, AFC Bridgnorth were established as a replacement. The new club started two levels lower, in Division One of the West Midlands (Regional) League. They won Division One at the first attempt, earning promotion to the Premier Division. In 2014–15 they were Premier Division runners-up, a feat matched the following season. At the end of the 2020–21 season the club were transferred to Division One of the Midland League when the Premier Division of the West Midlands (Regional) League lost its status as a step six division. In 2022–23 they finished second-from-bottom of Division One but avoided relegation due to Dawley Town being denied promotion from the Shropshire County League. The following season saw them finish bottom of Division One, but again avoid relegation.

== Honours ==
=== Bridgnorth Town ===
- Midland Combination
  - Champions 1979–80, 1982–83
- West Midlands (Regional) League
  - Premier Division champions 2007–08
- Welsh Amateur Cup
  - Winners 1970–71
- Shropshire Senior Cup
  - Winners 1985–86

=== AFC Bridgnorth ===
- West Midlands (Regional) League
  - Division One champions 2013–14

== Records ==
=== Bridgnorth Town ===
- Best FA Cup performance: Third qualifying round, 1983–84, 1984–85
- Best FA Trophy performance: Second qualifying round, 1994–95
- Best FA Vase performance: Fifth round, 1975–76, 1993–94

=== AFC Bridgnorth ===
- Best FA Cup performance: Preliminary round, 2015–16
- Best FA Vase performance: Second round, 2015–16, 2026–27

== See also ==
- A.F.C. Bridgnorth players
- A.F.C. Bridgnorth managers
