= Malvern Town F.C. =

Association football club in England

Coordinates: 52°07′00″N 2°18′15″W

Malvern Town
- Full name: Malvern Town Football Club
- Nickname: The Hillsiders
- Founded: 1946
- Ground: Langland Stadium, Malvern
- Capacity: 2,500
- Chairman: Chris Pinder
- Manager: Lee Hooper
- League: Southern League Premier Division South
- 2025–26: Southern League Division One South, 3rd of 22 (promoted via play-offs)
Home colours	Away colours

Malvern Town Football Club is a football club based in Malvern, Worcestershire, England. They are currently members of the Southern League Premier Division South and play at the Langland Stadium.

== History ==
The club was established in 1946 as Barnards Green Football Club. They joined the Worcester League, where they played until moving up to the Worcestershire Combination in 1955, going on to win the league at the first attempt. The club also won the Worcestershire Junior Cup and retained the trophy for the next two season, before winning it again in 1961–62. In 1967 the Worcestershire Combination was renamed the Midland Combination. The club won the inaugural Worcestershire Senior Urn in 1973–74, before retaining it for the next two seasons; they also finished as runners-up in the Midland Combination in 1973–74.

In 1979 Malvern transferred to the Premier Division of the West Midlands (Regional) League. Despite finishing bottom of the division in 1982–83, the club avoided being relegated. However, they were relegated to Division One at the end of the 1991–92 season. Despite only finishing ninth in Division One in 1993–94, the club were promoted back to the Premier Division. In 2003–04 they won the Premier Division title, earning promotion to the Midland Alliance. A third-place finish in the Alliance in 2005–06 saw the club promoted to Division One Midlands of the Southern League.

Malvern finished bottom of Division One Midlands in 2008–09 and were relegated back to the Midland Alliance. Two seasons later they finished bottom of the Midland Alliance and were relegated to the Premier Division of the West Midlands (Regional) League. The club won the Worcestershire Senior Urn for an eighth time in 2014–15. At the end of the 2018–19 season the club were transferred to Division One West of the Hellenic League. In 2021 they were promoted to the Premier Division based on their results in the abandoned 2019–20 and 2020–21 seasons. The club were runners-up in the Premier Division in 2022–23, qualifying for an inter-step play-off against Highworth Town of Division One Central of the Southern League. Malvern won the match 4–1 and were promoted to Division One South of the Southern League.

The 2024–25 season saw Malvern finish fourth in Division One South, qualifying for the promotion play-offs. They went on to beat Bishop's Cleeve 3–2 after extra time in the semi-finals before losing 1–0 to Evesham United in the final. They finished third in the division the following season, going on to beat Bishop's Cleeve 2–1 in the play-off semi-finals and Shaftesbury 3–2 in the final to secure promotion to the Premier Division South.

== Honours ==
- West Midlands (Regional) League
  - Premier Division champions 2003–04
- Midland Combination
  - Champions 1955–56
- Worcestershire Senior Urn
  - Winners 1973–74, 1974–75, 1975–76, 1978–79, 1983–84, 1989–90, 1999–2000, 2014–15
- Worcestershire Junior Cup
  - Winners 1955–56, 1956–57, 1957–58, 1961–62
- Worcestershire Minor Cup
  - Winners 1952–53

== Records ==
- Best FA Cup performance: Third qualifying round, 1981–82, 1986–87
- Best FA Trophy performance: Third qualifying round, 2025–26
- Best FA Vase performance: Fourth round, 1974–75, 1976–77, 2020–21
- Record attendance: 2,100 vs Shaftesbury, Southern League Division One South play-off final, 4 May 2026
- Most appearances: Nick Clayton
- Most goals: Graham Buffery

== See also ==
- Malvern Town F.C. players
- Malvern Town F.C. managers
