= Bewdley Town F.C. =

Association football club in England

Coordinates: 52.355140°N 2.3143736°W

Bewdley Town
- Full name: Bewdley Town Football Club
- Nickname: Riversiders
- Founded: 1978
- Ground: Ribbesford Meadows, Bewdley
- Chairman: Geoff Edwards
- Manager: Phil Mullen
- League: Hellenic League Division One
- 2024–25: Hellenic League Division One, 10th of 17
Home colours	Away colours

Bewdley Town Football Club is a football club based in Bewdley, Worcestershire, England. They are currently members of the Hellenic League Division One and play at Ribbesford Meadows.

== History ==
The club was established in 1978 by a merger of Bewdley Old Boys and Woodcolliers. They joined the Kidderminster & District League, where they played until joining Division One South of the West Midlands (Regional) League in 1999. The club were Division One South runners-up in 2001–02 and champions the following season, but were not able to take promotion.

League reorganisation saw Bewdley played in Division One for the 2004–05 season and they went on to win the division, taking promotion to the Premier Division after agreeing a groundshare with Stourport Swifts. In 2010–11 the club won the Worcestershire Senior Urn, beating Studley 2–1 in the final. They retained the Urn the following season, beating Alvechurch 3–2 in the final. In 2021 the club were promoted to the Premier Division of the Midland League based on their results in the abandoned 2019–20 and 2020–21 seasons.

In 2023–24 Bewdley finished bottom of the Midland League Premier Division and were relegated to Division One of the Hellenic League.

== Ground ==
The club initially played at Gardeners Meadow, which had been the home ground of both Bewdley Old Boys and Woodcolliers. However, after it was sold for housing, the club temporarily moved to Kidderminster before purchasing land to build the Ribbesford Meadow Ground. They were forced to groundshare with Stourport Swifts for the 2005–06 season in order to take promotion to the Premier Division, but returned to Ribbesford Meadow the following season after building a 140-seat stand and erecting floodlights.

== Honours ==
- West Midlands (Regional) League
  - Division One South champions 2002–03
- Worcestershire Senior Urn
  - Winners 2010–11, 2011–12
- Worcestershire Junior Cup
  - Winners 2003–04, 2004–05

== Records ==
- Best FA Cup performance: First qualifying round, 2011–12, 2012–13
- Best FA Vase performance: Second round, 2007–08, 2009–10, 2020–21

== See also ==
- Bewdley Town F.C. players
- Bewdley Town F.C. managers
