= Stourport Swifts F.C. =

Association football club in England

Coordinates: 52°20′07.54″N 2°16′50.61″W

Stourport Swifts
- Full name: Stourport Swifts Football Club
- Nickname: Swifts
- Founded: 1882; 144 years ago
- Ground: Walshes Meadow; Stourport-on-Severn; Worcestershire
- Capacity: 2,000 (250 seated)
- Chairman: Pip Hanson
- Manager: Craig Gregg
- League: Hellenic League Premier Division
- 2025–26: Midland League Premier Division, 14th of 18 (transferred)
- Website: https://www.stourportswiftsfc.co.uk/
Home colours	Away colours

Stourport Swifts Football Club are an English football team from Stourport-on-Severn. The Swifts currently play in the Hellenic League Premier Division, and play at Walshes Meadow in the town.

== History ==
Stourport Swifts was formed in 1882 and began playing competitive football shortly after. In 1931, they joined the Warwickshire League but only played in the league for two seasons before leaving the league, but were back five years later until the outbreak of World War II. When the league resumed Stourport rejoined the league. The club played in the Worcestershire League throughout the 1970s before joining the West Midlands (Regional) League Division Two in 1979–80. A fourth-placed finish in 1985–86 earned the club promotion to division one and two seasons later the club was promoted to the premier division after finishing in second place. The club finished in second place in the premier division in 1996–97 and then on 1997–98 and the second runner-up finish was enough to earn the club promotion to the Midland Alliance. Their third season in that league saw them win their first ever league championship and they were promoted into the Southern League. 2000–01 also saw the club reach the fifth round of the FA Vase. The club was placed in the West Division, finishing in eighth place in their debut season and got to the third round proper of the FA Trophy. However, the club failed to finish in the top half in subsequent seasons and were relegated back to the Midland Alliance in 2012.

== Honours ==
- West Midlands League Division One Runners Up: 1987–88
- West Midlands League Premier Division Runners Up: 1993–94, 1996–97, 1997–98
- West Midlands League Premier Division Cup Winners: 1992–93
- Worcester Senior Urn Winners: 1992–93, 1993–94, 1994–95, 1997–98
- Worcester Infirmary Cup Winners: 1993–94, 1994–95, 1995–96, 1997–98
- Midland Football Alliance Winners: 2000–01
- Worcestershire Senior Cup Winners: 2022–23

== Club records ==
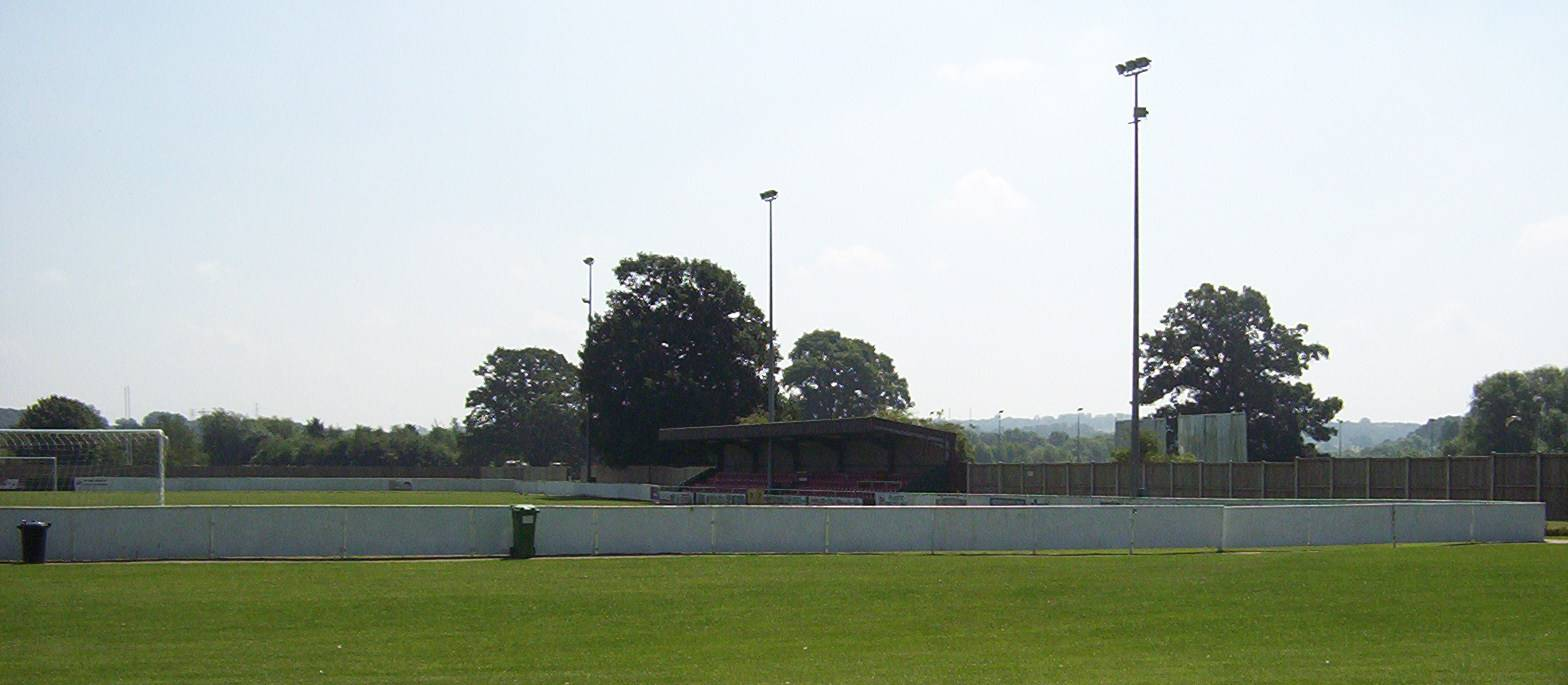
The club's home ground, Walshes Meadow

- Best league performance: 8th in Southern League Division One West, 2001–02
- Best FA Cup performance: 3rd qualifying round, 2000–01 and 2001–02
- Best FA Trophy performance: 3rd round, 2001–02
- Best FA Vase performance: 5th round, 2000–01, 2023–24
- Record attendance: 1,903 v Worcester City, 10 February 2024
