= Cradley Town F.C. =

Association football club in England

Coordinates: 52.451191°N 2.0895119°W

Cradley Town
- Full name: Cradley Town Football & Social Club
- Nickname: The Hammers
- Founded: 1970
- Ground: Beeches View, Cradley
- Chairman: Trevor Thomas
- Managers: Jamie Oliver and Matt Clark
- League: Midland League Division One
- 2025–26: Midland League Division One, 14th of 21
| Home colours | Away colours |

Cradley Town Football Club is a football club based in Cradley, near Halesowen in the West Midlands. They are currently members of the Midland League Division One and play at Beeches View.

== History ==
The club was established in 1970 by a merger of Albion Rovers and Haden Rangers. The new club played in the Premier Division of the West Midlands Metropolitan League, which they won at the first attempt. Under the name Albion Haden United, they joined Division Two of the Midland Combination in 1971. The club went on to win the division in 1972–73, although they were not promoted to Division One due to a narrow pitch. In 1975 the club was renamed Cradley Town. They were Division Two runners-up in 1975–76 and again in 1977–78. After finishing fourth in 1978–79 and having widened the pitch, the club were promoted to Division One for the 1979-80 season.

In 1983 Cradley transferred to the Premier Division of the West Midlands (Regional) League. They finished bottom of the Premier Division in their first season in the league and were relegated to Division One. In 1989–90 the club finished bottom of Division One, but were not relegated and went on to win the division the following season, earning promotion back to the Premier Division; the season also saw them win the Wednesbury Charity Cup. In 1998–99 they were Premier Division runners-up and were promoted to the Midland Alliance.

Cradley finished bottom of the Midland Alliance in 2001–02, but were not relegated. They finished bottom again in 2006–07 and 2007–08, but remained in the division until being relegated at the end of the 2009–10 season, which had seen them finish bottom of the league for a fourth time and fail to win a league match; the club then dropped back into the Premier Division of the West Midlands (Regional) League. At the end of the 2020–21 season they were transferred to Division One of the Midland League when the Premier Division of the West Midlands (Regional) League lost its status as a step six division.

In 2024–25 Cradley finished fourth in Division One, qualifying for the promotion play-offs, in which they lost 3–2 to Leicester St Andrews in the semi-finals.

== Ground ==
The club play at Beeches View, which had been the home ground of Albion Rovers prior to the 1970 merger. A small stand was built in the late 1970s and floodlights were erected during the 1990–91 season.

== Honours ==
- West Midlands (Regional) League
  - Division One champions 1990–91
- Midland Combination
  - Division Two champions 1972–73
  - Presidents Cup winners 1974–75, 1975–76
- West Midlands Metropolitan League
  - Premier Division champions 1970–71
- Wednesbury Charity Cup
  - Winners 1990–91
- Birmingham County FA Midweek Floodlit Cup
  - Winners 2024-25

== Records ==
- Best FA Cup performance: Second qualifying round, 2008–09
- Best FA Vase performance: Second round, 2005–06, 2007–08
- Biggest win: 9–1 vs Wolverhampton United, 1990–91
- Heaviest defeat: 11–0 vs Boldmere St. Michaels, 2007–08

== See also ==
- Cradley Town F.C. players
- Cradley Town F.C. managers
