= Shifnal Town F.C. =

Association football club in England

Coordinates: 52°40′23″N 2°21′43″W

Shifnal Town
- Full name: Shifnal Town Football Club
- Nicknames: The Town, Reds, The Shif
- Founded: 1964; 62 years ago (as St. Andrew's Youth Club)
- Ground: Acoustafoam Stadium, Shifnal; Shropshire
- Capacity: 1,500
- Chairman: Mike Tranter
- Manager: Elliott Bennett
- League: Northern Premier League Division One West
- 2025–26: Northern Premier League Division One West, 12th of 22
Home colours	Away colours

Shifnal Town Football Club is a football club based in Shifnal, Shropshire, England. They have reached the 4th round of the FA Vase three times in their history. The team competes in the Northern Premier League Division One West.

== History ==
Although other clubs with similar names had played in the town since Victorian times, the modern incarnation of Shifnal Town FC was founded in 1964 as St Andrews Youth Club FC, based at Idsall School and initially playing in the Wellington and District League. They soon changed their name to Shifnal Juniors and, in 1968, were promoted to Division Two, which they won at the first attempt and then successfully applied to join the Shropshire County Football League. In 1972, the club changed its name once again to Shifnal Town and, in 1976, the team won the County League title and were elected to the West Midlands (Regional) League.

In 1979, the club, by now playing at Admirals Park, won promotion to the Premier Division. They went on to win consecutive Premier Division Championships in 1980–81 and 1981–82, with promotion to the Southern League only being denied due to a lack of floodlights.

In 1985, the club saw their lease on Admirals Park terminated and were forced to resign from the league and return to the County league, playing once again at Idsall School. Nonetheless, the club was able to purchase the land to build a new ground, Phoenix Park. At the same time, success in the County league saw them able to step up to the Midland Football Combination in 1993–94, with a successful first season enabling them to become founder members of the new Midland Football Alliance. Their best season at this level was their first, after which their performances declined until they finished bottom in 1997–98, and only avoided relegation as no clubs from the Alliance's feeder leagues were eligible for promotion.

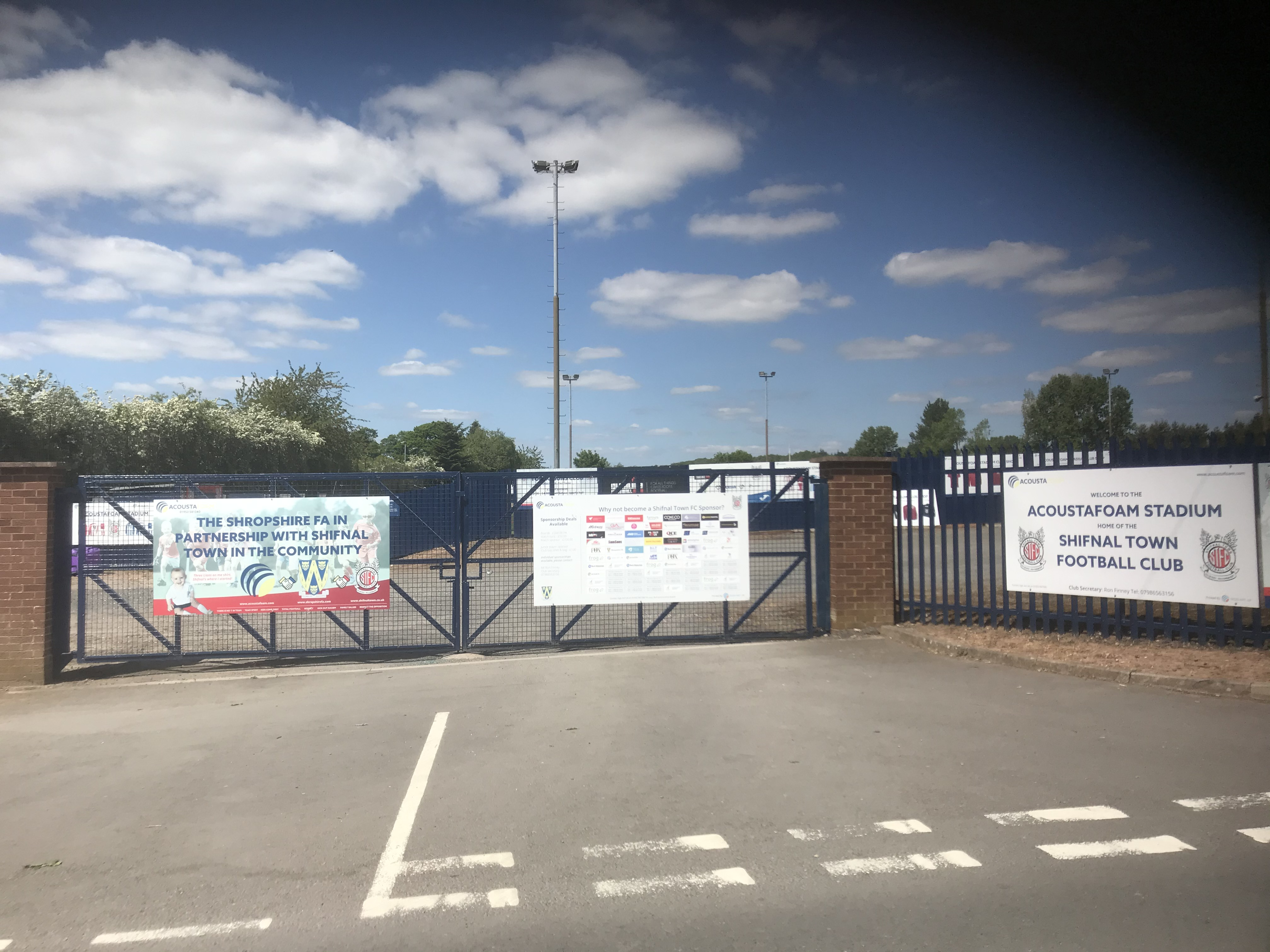
The entrance to the club's home ground

The club finally succumbed to relegation in 2003, and spent three seasons back in the Midland Combination before a re-organisation of the leagues in the West Midlands area in 2006 saw them return to the West Midlands (Regional) League after an absence of 20 years, where they were crowned league champions at the first attempt.

In 2021, the club were promoted to the Premier Division of the Midland League based on their results in the abandoned 2019–20 and 2020–21 seasons. In May 2023, Connor Patterson was named new first team manager.

In 2025, the club was promoted to the Northern Premier League Division One West, the 8th tier of the football pyramid, after finishing in second place and winning the play-off final, this being the highest level the club has played at.

== Honours ==
- West Midlands (Regional) League Premier Division
  - Champions: 1980–81, 1981–82, 2006–07
- West Midlands (Regional) League Division One
  - Champions: 1978–79, 2015–16

== Club records ==
- Best league position: 2nd in Midland Football League Premier Division, 2024–25
- Best FA Cup performance: 4th qualifying round, 1982–83
- Best FA Trophy performance: 3rd qualifying round, 2025–26
- Best FA Vase performance: 4th round, 1981–82, 1982–83, 1983–84

== See also ==
- Shropshire#Football
