= Dudley Town F.C. =

Association football club in England

Coordinates: 52.4898°N 2.1352°W

Dudley Town
- Full name: Dudley Town Football Club
- Nickname: The Robins
- Founded: 1888
- Ground: Guardian Warehousing Arena, Noose Lane, Willenhall
- Chairman: David Ferrier
- Manager: Vacant
- League: Midland League Premier Division
- 2025–26: Midland League Premier Division, 6th of 18
- Website: www.dudleytownfootballclub.co.uk
| Home colours | Away colours |

Dudley Town Football Club is a football club based in Dudley, West Midlands, England. The club is one of the oldest non-league teams in the Midlands region, having been established in 1888. They are members of the Midland League Premier Division, although they have reached as high as the Premier Division of the Southern League, and in 1976, reached the first round proper of the FA Cup, when a crowd of over 5,000 saw them take Football League Third Division team York City to a replay.

== History ==
=== Founding ===
Dudley Town was founded in 1888, and in 1898, incorporated another club from the town, Dudley St John's, moving onto the latter's ground at Shavers End and entering the Birmingham & District League. After World War I, the club was dormant for a number of years, but in 1928, it was re-formed and entered the Cradley Heath and District League, before moving on to the Worcestershire Combination.

In 1932, the club moved into the Sports Ground, which had been built as part of a project to provide work for a large number of unemployed men in the borough in the inter-war years. Over 16,000 people attended the opening match at what was to remain the Robins' home for fifty years.

In the early 1930s, Dudley dominated the Worcestershire Combination and soon moved up to the more prestigious Birmingham League. Unfortunately, the club could not bear the increased financial strain and folded shortly before World War II.

=== Post World War II ===
After the war, the club was resurrected and progressed via the Birmingham Combination to rejoin the Birmingham League, which in 1962 was renamed the West Midlands (Regional) League. The club enjoyed a run to the first round of the FA Cup in the 1976–77 season, where they were drawn against York City and held them to a draw at The Sports Ground in front of a reported 5,000 fans, before losing 4–1 in a replay.

In the 1981–82 season, the Robins were promoted to the Southern Football League Midland Division for the first time in the club's history. During that same season, the club installed floodlights for the first time. The floodlights were switched on by local hero Billy Wright. Reportedly, Wolverhampton Wanderers even turned down a prestigious close season tour to allow Wright to perform the ceremony. The club also refurbished the 1,800-seat stadium and installed a VIP section, press box, and state of the art public address system.

In the 1984–85 season, Dudley won the Southern League Midland Division to be promoted to the Southern League Premier Division for the first time, helped by strikers Brian Beresford and Brendan Drummond scoring over 50 goals between them.

In the same year, however, days after the final game of the season was played against Stourbridge and clinching the title, mine workings under the adjacent cricket ground collapsed, leading to the Sports Ground and the club's stadium being closed down and condemned, forcing the Robins to ground share with a number of different local clubs. There were a number of plans over the next few years for the old ground to be made safe and enable the club's return, but this never happened and, by the early 1990s, it was decided that the ground would be redeveloped as a business and leisure park.

On 24 April 1986, Dudley won the Birmingham Senior Cup against local rivals Willenhall Town 4–2. This was played at West Bromwich Albion's ground, The Hawthorns in front of over 4,000 fans.

In 1988, the club moved to a new permanent home at the Round Oak Stadium in Brierley Hill, where they celebrated a successful centenary year, however, by 1996, the costs of the ground were spiralling. The club officially moved out in 1996, to a ground share arrangement at the home of Halesowen Town, with plans to sell Round Oak. For a while after leaving Dudley Sports Centre in 1986, there was speculation that the old ground would be made safe and Dudley Town could be playing back there by 1990, but these plans came to nothing and, by the year 2000, the site was being developed as a leisure and commercial park. However, the proposed sale dragged on, and in 1997, facing increasing financial difficulties, the club was forced to resign its place in the Southern League and close down.

At the end of the 2020–21 season, Dudley Town were transferred to Division One of the Midland League when the Premier Division of the West Midlands (Regional) League lost its status as a step six division.

=== Current status ===
In late 1997, club president Nevil Jeynes reformed the club and they were accepted into the West Midlands (Regional) League, exactly 100 years after they had first joined its predecessor, the Birmingham League. After two years ground-sharing with local rivals Gornal Athletic, the decision was taken to leave the borough of Dudley and play at The Beeches, home of Tividale, situated just over the border since border changes in 1966. After a four-year exile, Town returned to the borough in 2003, having signed a deal to play for the next five years at The War Memorial Athletic Ground in Amblecote, but in 2007 the club moved once again to the Dell Sports Centre in Brierley Hill. In the same year, they received entry into the FA Cup after an absence of over 15 years. Nonetheless, the club still plans to eventually return to a ground in the heart of Dudley itself and hopes to challenge for an eventual return to the Southern League.

The 2008–09 season saw Dudley Town achieve their highest ever points total of 79 and finish once again in 5th position. The season also saw their longest ever run in the FA Vase, reaching the second round before losing away against Daventry Town. The goalscoring exceeded that achieved in the last 14 years, with three players scoring over 15 goals. The season also ended with them being awarded FA Charter Standard. Their fifth-place finish in the 2006–07 West Midlands (Regional) League was their biggest achievement in a decade. The 2022–23 season saw Dudley promoted to step 5 as Champions.

== Honours ==
1906 Bass Charity Vase Champions

1933–34 Champions Birmingham Combination.

1945–46 Joint Holders Worc Senior Cup.

1947–48 Runners up Birmingham Comb.

1964–65 Runners Up Birmingham Senior Cup. Winners Camkin Cup.

1980–81 Runners up West Mids Lge Div 2 Cup.

1983–84 Runners up Birmingham Senior Cup.

1984–85 Champions Southern Lge Mid Div. Runners up Worc Senior Cup.

1985–86 Winners Birmingham Senior Cup.

2006–07 Runners up in West Midlands Premier League Cup.

2006–07 Runners up in Birmingham Midweek Floodlit Cup.

2022-23 Midland Football League Division One Champions.

2024-25 JW Hunt Charity Cup Winners.

== Records ==
- Best league performance: 12th in Southern League Premier Division, 1985–86
- Best FA Cup performance: 1st round proper, 1976–77
- Best FA Trophy performance: 2nd round, 1984–85 and 1995–96
- Best FA Vase performance: 2nd round 2008–09, 2013–14, 2019–20, 2023–24, and 2025–26
- Biggest win: 12–3 v Wolverhampton United, October 2011 / 9-0 v Mahal, August 2012
- Most goals in a game: 6, Bobby Watson v Tamworth, April 1967
- Most goals in a season: 56, Frank Treagust, 1947–48

== Sources ==
- Dudley Town at the Football Club History Database
