= Wednesfield F.C. =

Association football club in England

Coordinates: 52°36′22.09″N 2°05′01.03″W

Wednesfield
- Full name: Wednesfield Football Club
- Nickname: The Cottagers
- Founded: 1961 (as Wednesfield Social F.C.)
- Ground: Cottage Ground, Wednesfield
- Chairman: Graham Hyde
- Manager: Sean Geddes
- League: North West Counties League Division One South
- 2025–26: Midland League Division One, 20th of 21 (transferred)
Home colours	Away colours

Wednesfield Football Club are a football club based in Wednesfield, West Midlands, England. They were established in 1961. They have reached the 3rd round of the FA Vase twice in their history. They are members of the North West Counties League Division One South.

== History ==
The club was originally formed in 1961 as Wednesfield Social FC, changing its name in 1989. They gained entry to the West Midlands (Regional) League in 1976 and won the championship of Division One A in their first season, followed by a runners-up position in Division One the very next season, clinching promotion to the Premier Division.

The club reached the final of the Staffordshire Senior Cup in 1993–94, to face Macclesfield Town, but because of building work at Moss Rose, the final (due to be played over two legs) was delayed from May to August 1994. This was disastrous for the club, as, over the summer, with the Cottagers missing out on a place in the new Midland Alliance league, nine of its players left, and a scratch side lost the home leg 10–1, and the away leg 4–0. Even worse, during the second half of the game, a thief stole around £1,000 of the players' money and belongings, the players carrying more money than normal as the club had planned an outing to Blackpool after the game.

In 1995–96, they won the Premier Division title but were not promoted, however the following year they repeated their title success and this time moved up to the Midland Alliance, where they remained for six seasons before a last place finish in 2002–03 saw them relegated back to the West Midlands League, where they have struggled. In fact, in 2004–05, they finished bottom but were spared relegation.

After a few years of consolidation, a new management team came in during the 2006–07 season. The team finished the season in thirteenth place but the following year finished in fourth place and reach the finals of the League Cup and the J.W. Hunt Cup. At the end of the 2020–21 season, the club were transferred to Division One of the Midland League when the Premier Division of the West Midlands (Regional) League lost its status as a step six division.

== Ground ==
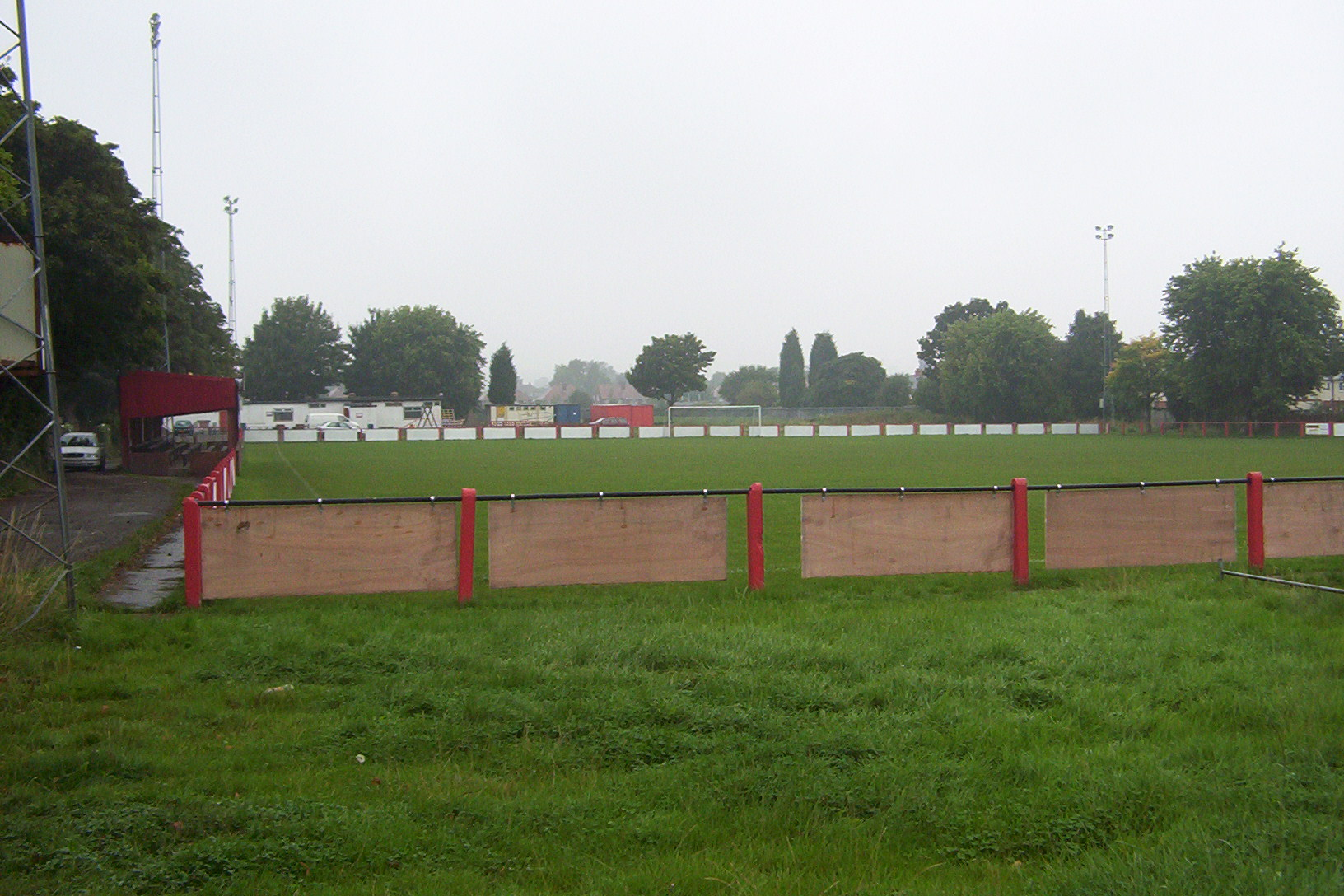
The club's home ground

The Cottage Ground in Amos Lane, Wednesfield has been the team's home since 1971. For the first ten years of their existence, they played at King George's Park. The Cottage itself was an institute for homeless and orphaned children until its closure in the early 1970s, and the land where the football club is now situated had been its sports field.

The highest attendance recorded at the Cottage Ground is 480. In 2003, a crowd of just 10 people was recorded for the visit of Biddulph Victoria, the lowest attendance ever recorded in the Midland Alliance.

== Honours ==
- West Midlands Regional League
  - Premier Division Champions 1995–96, 1996–97
  - Division One Champions 1977–78
  - Division One A Champions 1976–77
  - JW Hunt Cup Winners 2007–08

== Records ==
- Best league performance: 3rd in Midland Alliance, 2001–02
- Best FA Cup performance: 2nd qualifying round, 1983–84
- Best FA Vase performance: 3rd round, 1978–79, 1981–82

== Ladies' teams ==
The club also has two open age ladies football teams based at the club although not affiliated with each other. Wednesfield FC Ladies play in the Birmingham County Women's League Premier Division. They have progressed through all the age groups since formation by manager Paul Smith in 2005. In the 2014–15 season they were Division 2 Champions with a 100% record which earned them a double promotion. Wednesfield Town Ladies play in the Birmingham Regional Women's League Premier Division.
