= 1991–92 Midland Football Combination =

The 1991–92 Midland Football Combination season was the 55th in the history of Midland Football Combination, a football competition in England.

== Premier Division ==
Midland Football Combination Premier Division
- Season: 1991–92
- Champions: Evesham United
- Promoted: Evesham United
- Matches: 420
- Goals: 1,281 (3.05 per match)

The Premier Division featured 17 clubs which competed in the division last season, along with four new clubs:

- Alcester Town, promoted from Division One
- Armitage 90, joined from the Staffordshire Senior Football League
- Barlestone St. Giles, joined from the Leicestershire Senior League
- Pershore Town, promoted from Division One

=== League table ===
Pos	Team	Pld	W	D	L	GF	GA	GD	Pts	Promotion or relegation
1	Evesham United	40	28	7	5	76	31	+45	91	Promoted to the Southern Football League
2	Armitage 90	40	27	7	6	84	28	+56	88	
3	West Midlands Police	40	24	8	8	86	44	+42	80	
4	Highgate United	40	22	11	7	71	34	+37	77	
5	Sandwell Borough	40	21	8	11	81	45	+36	71	
6	Pershore Town	40	19	11	10	76	41	+35	68	
7	Walsall Wood	40	18	13	9	66	42	+24	67	Resigned to the Staffordshire Senior League
8	Stapenhill	40	18	9	13	83	67	+16	63	
9	Boldmere St. Michaels	40	17	9	14	69	52	+17	60	
10	Bolehall Swifts	40	15	14	11	59	47	+12	59	
11	Northfield Town	40	14	15	11	48	54	−6	57	
12	Coleshill Town	40	12	15	13	46	48	−2	51	
13	Alcester Town	40	11	9	20	53	74	−21	42	
14	Stratford Town	40	11	8	21	47	64	−17	41	
15	Chelmsley Town	40	12	5	23	61	111	−50	41	
16	Knowle	40	10	9	21	59	77	−18	39	
17	Barlestone St. Giles	40	10	9	21	39	78	−39	39	
18	Kings Heath	40	10	8	22	45	68	−23	38	Demoted to Division One
19	Hinckley	40	10	8	22	49	79	−30	38	Merged into Barwell
20	Bloxwich Town	40	9	8	23	48	83	−35	35	
21	Mile Oak Rovers	40	3	7	30	35	114	−79	16	

Source: nonleaguematters
Rules for classification: 1) points; 2) goal difference; 3) number of goals scored.
