= 1977–78 Midland Football Combination =

The 1977–78 Midland Football Combination season was the 41st in the history of Midland Football Combination, a football competition in England.

== Division One ==
Midland Football Combination Division One
- Season: 1977–78
- Champions: Sutton Coldfield Town
- Relegated: Stratford Town
- Matches: 380
- Goals: 1,042 (2.74 per match)

Division One featured 17 clubs which competed in the division last season along with three new clubs:

- Mile Oak Rovers, promoted from Division Two
- Stratford Town, transferred from the Hellenic Football League
- Walsall Sportsco, promoted from Division Two

=== League table ===
Pos	Team	Pld	W	D	L	GF	GA	GD	Pts	Promotion or relegation
1	Sutton Coldfield Town	38	20	12	6	77	34	+43	52	
2	Paget Rangers	38	21	9	8	74	36	+38	51	
3	Blakenall	38	19	13	6	57	24	+33	51	
4	Walsall Sportsco	38	20	10	8	62	32	+30	50	
5	Cinderford Town	38	18	10	10	73	39	+34	46	
6	Bridgnorth Town	38	16	14	8	60	28	+32	46	
7	Moor Green	38	16	14	8	66	41	+25	46	
8	Malvern Town	38	16	13	9	59	41	+18	45	
9	Racing Club Warwick	38	16	10	12	51	44	+7	42	
10	Evesham United	38	15	12	11	49	46	+3	42	
11	Solihull Borough	38	10	17	11	45	48	−3	37	
12	Highgate United	38	14	7	17	56	62	−6	35	
13	Mile Oak Rovers	38	9	17	12	35	47	−12	35	
14	Northfield Town	38	11	12	15	55	60	−5	34	
15	Boldmere St. Michaels	38	11	10	17	35	48	−13	32	
16	Oldbury United	38	10	12	16	51	65	−14	32	
17	Coleshill Town	38	8	10	20	38	79	−41	26	
18	West Midlands Police	38	4	17	17	32	61	−29	25	
19	Knowle	38	7	6	25	38	80	−42	20	
20	Stratford Town	38	4	5	29	29	127	−98	13	Relegated to Division Two

Source: nonleaguematters
Rules for classification: 1) points; 2) goal difference; 3) number of goals scored.
