= 1980–81 Midland Football Combination =

The 1980–81 Midland Football Combination season was the 44th in the history of Midland Football Combination, a football competition in England.

== Division One ==
Midland Football Combination Division One
- Season: 1980–81
- Champions: Moor Green
- Matches: 380
- Goals: 1,114 (2.93 per match)

Division One featured 18 clubs which competed in the division last season along with two new clubs, promoted from Division Two:

- Hurley Daw Mill Miners Welfare
- Smethwick Highfield

=== League table ===
Pos	Team	Pld	W	D	L	GF	GA	GD	Pts
1	Moor Green	38	28	7	3	109	30	+79	63
2	Bridgnorth Town	38	22	7	9	76	38	+38	51
3	Mile Oak Rovers	38	21	8	9	63	43	+20	50
4	Cinderford Town	38	22	5	11	68	30	+38	49
5	Boldmere St. Michaels	38	18	11	9	50	39	+11	47
6	Oldbury United	38	18	10	10	65	47	+18	46
7	Chipping Norton Town	38	16	11	11	58	45	+13	43
8	Racing Club Warwick	38	16	10	12	66	46	+20	42
9	Knowle	38	16	10	12	50	42	+8	42
10	Hurley Daw Mill Miners Welfare	38	14	11	13	54	56	−2	39
11	Highgate United	38	16	6	16	79	61	+18	38
12	West Midlands Police	38	11	15	12	62	58	+4	37
13	Paget Rangers	38	13	11	14	42	41	+1	37
14	Solihull Borough	38	13	10	15	58	69	−11	36
15	Evesham United	38	10	10	18	57	81	−24	30
16	Walsall Sportsco	38	8	12	18	49	69	−20	28
17	Walsall Wood	38	10	8	20	42	71	−29	28
18	Smethwick Highfield	38	8	10	20	36	74	−38	26
19	Cradley Town	38	5	4	29	33	100	−67	14
20	Coleshill Town	38	5	4	29	27	104	−77	14

Source: nonleaguematters
Rules for classification: 1) points; 2) goal difference; 3) number of goals scored.
