= 1981–82 Midland Football Combination =

The 1981–82 Midland Football Combination season was the 45th in the history of Midland Football Combination, a football competition in England.

== Division One ==
Midland Football Combination Division One
- Season: 1981–82
- Champions: Chipping Norton Town
- Matches: 462
- Goals: 1,357 (2.94 per match)

Division One featured 20 clubs which competed in the division last season along with two new clubs, promoted from Division Two:

- Northfield Town
- Stratford Town

=== League table ===
Pos	Team	Pld	W	D	L	GF	GA	GD	Pts	Promotion or relegation
1	Chipping Norton Town	42	27	9	6	106	43	+63	63	
2	Highgate United	42	27	6	9	85	46	+39	60	
3	Mile Oak Rovers	42	24	10	8	78	49	+29	58	
4	Cinderford Town	42	19	16	7	71	40	+31	54	
5	Oldbury United	42	22	8	12	67	44	+23	52	Promoted to the Southern League
6	Bridgnorth Town	42	20	12	10	65	47	+18	52	
7	Moor Green	42	22	7	13	84	59	+25	51	
8	Knowle	42	16	16	10	64	50	+14	48	
9	Walsall Sportsco	42	18	10	14	68	54	+14	46	Merged into Walsall Borough
10	Racing Club Warwick	42	16	13	13	68	64	+4	45	
11	West Midlands Police	42	14	14	14	70	70	0	42	
12	Boldmere St. Michaels	42	14	14	14	59	60	−1	42	
13	Coleshill Town	42	16	8	18	57	68	−11	40	
14	Stratford Town	42	12	12	18	37	49	−12	36	
15	Smethwick Highfield	42	13	10	19	49	64	−15	36	
16	Northfield Town	42	15	6	21	56	76	−20	36	
17	Solihull Borough	42	11	13	18	46	68	−22	35	
18	Cradley Town	42	12	10	20	60	80	−20	34	
19	Paget Rangers	42	10	14	18	43	63	−20	34	
20	Walsall Wood	42	9	8	25	40	82	−42	26	Merged into Walsall Borough
21	Evesham United	42	6	9	27	40	83	−43	21	
22	Hurley Daw Mill Miners Welfare	42	3	7	32	42	96	−54	13	

Source: nonleaguematters
Rules for classification: 1) points; 2) goal difference; 3) number of goals scored.
