= 1986–87 Midland Football Combination =

The 1986–87 Midland Football Combination season was the 50th in the history of Midland Football Combination, a football competition in England.

== Premier Division ==
Midland Football Combination Premier Division
- Season: 1986–87
- Champions: Stratford Town
- Promoted: Paget Rangers
- Matches: 380
- Goals: 1,163 (3.06 per match)

The Premier Division featured 18 clubs which competed in the division last season along with two new clubs, promoted from Division One:

- Bolehall Swifts
- Princes End United

Also, Walsall Borough changed name to Walsall Wood, Knowle North Star changed name to Knowle and Smethwick Highfield changed name to Ashtree Highfield.

=== League table ===
Pos	Team	Pld	W	D	L	GF	GA	GD	Pts	Promotion or relegation
1	Stratford Town	38	23	13	2	81	29	+52	59	
2	Paget Rangers	38	24	9	5	98	30	+68	57	Promoted to the Southern Football League
3	Racing Club Warwick	38	24	8	6	93	29	+64	56	
4	Boldmere St. Michaels	38	22	11	5	73	32	+41	55	
5	West Midlands Police	38	14	16	8	65	51	+14	44	
6	Northfield Town	38	15	10	13	57	46	+11	40	
7	Solihull Borough	38	13	13	12	58	69	−11	39	
8	Walsall Wood	38	16	6	16	54	52	+2	38	
9	Highgate United	38	15	7	16	50	49	+1	37	
10	Ashtree Highfield	38	15	6	17	47	59	−12	36	
11	Polesworth North Warwick	38	13	10	15	51	64	−13	36	
12	Princes End United	38	14	8	16	51	69	−18	36	
13	Evesham United	38	10	11	17	62	75	−13	31	
14	Knowle	38	11	8	19	51	66	−15	30	
15	Kings Heath	38	9	12	17	36	52	−16	30	
16	Bloxwich	38	12	5	21	56	73	−17	29	
17	Southam United	38	9	11	18	42	75	−33	29	Demoted to Division Two
18	Coleshill Town	38	11	5	22	49	81	−32	27	
19	Studley Sporting	38	9	8	21	43	78	−35	26	Resigned from the league
20	Bolehall Swifts	38	7	11	20	46	84	−38	25	

Source: nonleaguematters
Rules for classification: 1) points; 2) goal difference; 3) number of goals scored.
