= 1985–86 Midland Football Combination =

The 1985–86 Midland Football Combination season was the 49th in the history of Midland Football Combination, a football competition in England.

== Premier Division ==
Midland Football Combination Premier Division
- Season: 1985–86
- Champions: Boldmere St. Michaels
- Matches: 380
- Goals: 1,100 (2.89 per match)

The Premier Division featured 19 clubs which competed in the division last season along with one new club, promoted from Division One:

- Bloxwich

=== League table ===
Pos	Team	Pld	W	D	L	GF	GA	GD	Pts	Promotion or relegation
1	Boldmere St. Michaels	38	25	10	3	72	24	+48	60	
2	Paget Rangers	38	24	9	5	94	31	+63	57	
3	West Midlands Police	38	23	8	7	65	41	+24	54	
4	Northfield Town	38	18	12	8	74	50	+24	48	
5	Bloxwich	38	18	11	9	77	50	+27	47	
6	Stratford Town	38	17	12	9	53	32	+21	46	
7	Solihull Borough	38	18	7	13	62	45	+17	43	
8	Walsall Borough	38	15	13	10	52	37	+15	43	
9	Polesworth North Warwick	38	16	10	12	52	46	+6	42	
10	Racing Club Warwick	38	13	15	10	52	50	+2	41	
11	Coleshill Town	38	14	13	11	54	54	0	41	
12	Highgate United	38	16	8	14	56	55	+1	40	
13	Evesham United	38	12	9	17	62	80	−18	33	
14	Hurley Daw Mill Miners Welfare	38	12	8	18	44	59	−15	32	Resigned from the league
15	New World	38	9	7	22	46	73	−27	25	Resigned from the league
16	Knowle North Star	38	8	9	21	35	63	−28	25	
17	Southam United	38	6	12	20	52	90	−38	24	
18	Studley Sporting	38	7	8	23	43	75	−32	22	
19	Smethwick Highfield	38	5	11	22	31	75	−44	21	
20	Kings Heath	38	5	6	27	24	70	−46	16	

Source: nonleaguematters
Rules for classification: 1) points; 2) goal difference; 3) number of goals scored.
