= 1970–71 Midland Football Combination =

The 1970–71 Midland Football Combination season was the 34th in the history of Midland Football Combination, a football competition in England.

== Division One ==
Midland Football Combination Division One
- Season: 1970–71
- Champions: Paget Rangers
- Relegated: Whitmore Old Boys
- Matches: 306
- Goals: 1,046 (3.42 per match)

Division One featured 16 clubs which competed in the division last season along with two new clubs:

- Knowle, promoted from Division One
- Stratford Town Amateurs, transferred from the West Midlands (Regional) League, who also changed name to Stratford Town

=== League table ===
Pos	Team	Pld	W	D	L	GF	GA	GR	Pts	Promotion or relegation
1	Paget Rangers	34	25	5	4	81	32	2.531	55	
2	Sutton Coldfield Town	34	22	8	4	75	32	2.344	52	
3	Evesham United	34	19	8	7	78	45	1.733	46	
4	Moor Green	34	17	9	8	63	33	1.909	43	
5	Alvechurch	34	17	7	10	67	47	1.426	41	
6	Boldmere St. Michaels	34	16	9	9	62	52	1.192	41	
7	Malvern Town	34	15	8	11	60	59	1.017	38	
8	Blakenall	34	16	5	13	65	56	1.161	37	
9	Oldbury United	34	14	8	12	64	40	1.600	36	
10	Highgate United	34	13	8	13	58	52	1.115	34	
11	Bridgnorth Town	34	12	5	17	70	83	0.843	29	
12	Smethwick Highfield	34	10	8	16	45	70	0.643	28	
13	Walsall Wood	34	10	7	17	49	71	0.690	27	
14	Knowle	34	8	10	16	57	70	0.814	26	
15	West Midlands Police	34	9	5	20	39	76	0.513	23	
16	Northfield Town	34	8	6	20	41	68	0.603	22	
17	Stratford Town	34	6	6	22	27	70	0.386	18	
18	Whitmore Old Boys	34	5	6	23	45	90	0.500	16	Relegated to Division Two

Source: nonleaguematters
Rules for classification: 1) points; 2) goal difference; 3) number of goals scored.
