= 1971–72 Midland Football Combination =

The 1971–72 Midland Football Combination season was the 35th in the history of Midland Football Combination, a football competition in England.

== Division One ==
Midland Football Combination Division One
- Season: 1971–72
- Champions: Alvechurch
- Relegated: Smethwick Highfield
- Matches: 306
- Goals: 950 (3.1 per match)

Division One featured 17 clubs which competed in the division last season along with one new club:

- Solihull Borough, promoted from Division One

=== League table ===
| Pos | Team | Pld | W | D | L | GF | GA | GR | Pts | Promotion or relegation |
|---|---|---|---|---|---|---|---|---|---|---|
| 1 | Alvechurch | 34 | 27 | 1 | 6 | 111 | 27 | 4.111 | 55 | |
| 2 | Oldbury United | 34 | 23 | 6 | 5 | 68 | 35 | 1.943 | 52 | |
| 3 | Sutton Coldfield Town | 34 | 17 | 11 | 6 | 65 | 44 | 1.477 | 45 | |
| 4 | Highgate United | 34 | 18 | 8 | 8 | 63 | 31 | 2.032 | 44 | |
| 5 | Evesham United | 34 | 18 | 7 | 9 | 62 | 44 | 1.409 | 43 | |
| 6 | Moor Green | 34 | 13 | 12 | 9 | 55 | 44 | 1.250 | 38 | |
| 7 | Malvern Town | 34 | 13 | 10 | 11 | 50 | 44 | 1.136 | 36 | |
| 8 | Bridgnorth Town | 34 | 13 | 7 | 14 | 48 | 50 | 0.960 | 33 | |
| 9 | Walsall Wood | 34 | 14 | 4 | 16 | 48 | 54 | 0.889 | 32 | |
| 10 | Knowle | 34 | 12 | 7 | 15 | 50 | 54 | 0.926 | 31 | |
| 11 | Solihull Borough | 34 | 11 | 9 | 14 | 52 | 59 | 0.881 | 31 | |
| 12 | Blakenall | 34 | 10 | 7 | 17 | 46 | 62 | 0.742 | 27 | |
| 13 | Boldmere St. Michaels | 34 | 9 | 9 | 16 | 38 | 54 | 0.704 | 27 | |
| 14 | West Midlands Police | 34 | 10 | 7 | 17 | 42 | 73 | 0.575 | 27 | |
| 15 | Paget Rangers | 34 | 8 | 10 | 16 | 35 | 52 | 0.673 | 26 | |
| 16 | Stratford Town | 34 | 7 | 11 | 16 | 41 | 66 | 0.621 | 25 | |
| 17 | Northfield Town | 34 | 10 | 4 | 20 | 46 | 70 | 0.657 | 24 | |
| 18 | Smethwick Highfield | 34 | 4 | 8 | 22 | 30 | 87 | 0.345 | 16 | Relegated to Division Two |

Source: nonleaguematters
Rules for classification: 1) points; 2) goal difference; 3) number of goals scored.
