= 1975–76 Midland Football Combination =

The 1975–76 Midland Football Combination season was the 39th in the history of Midland Football Combination, a football competition in England.

== Division One ==
Midland Football Combination Division One
- Season: 1975–76
- Champions: Northfield Town
- Matches: 306
- Goals: 828 (2.71 per match)

Division One featured 16 clubs which competed in the division last season along with two new clubs:

- Cadbury Heath, joined from the Gloucestershire County League
- Coleshill Town, promoted from Division Two

=== League table ===
Pos	Team	Pld	W	D	L	GF	GA	GR	Pts
1	Northfield Town	34	23	5	6	63	30	2.100	51
2	Moor Green	34	20	10	4	72	39	1.846	50
3	Malvern Town	34	20	9	5	66	30	2.200	49
4	Paget Rangers	34	19	7	8	50	39	1.282	45
5	Racing Club Warwick	34	17	8	9	42	29	1.448	42
6	Sutton Coldfield Town	34	16	9	9	57	33	1.727	41
7	West Midlands Police	34	14	10	10	46	40	1.150	38
8	Blakenall	34	12	13	9	54	33	1.636	37
9	Bridgnorth Town	34	9	18	7	48	45	1.067	36
10	Evesham United	34	12	11	11	51	40	1.275	35
11	Solihull Borough	34	9	15	10	41	43	0.953	33
12	Cadbury Heath	34	11	8	15	47	47	1.000	30
13	Highgate United	34	11	8	15	46	53	0.868	30
14	Cinderford Town	34	8	8	18	40	60	0.667	24
15	Oldbury United	34	6	10	18	35	57	0.614	22
16	Boldmere St. Michaels	34	5	12	17	23	49	0.469	22
17	Coleshill Town	34	2	11	21	26	72	0.361	15
18	Knowle	34	2	8	24	21	89	0.236	12

Source: nonleaguematters
Rules for classification: 1) points; 2) goal difference; 3) number of goals scored.
