= 1979–80 Midland Football Combination =

The 1979–80 Midland Football Combination season was the 43rd in the history of Midland Football Combination, a football competition in England.

== Division One ==
Midland Football Combination Division One
- Season: 1979–80
- Champions: Bridgnorth Town
- Relegated: Northfield Town; Studley Sporting
- Matches: 380
- Goals: 1,000 (2.63 per match)

Division One featured 17 clubs which competed in the division last season along with three new clubs:

- Chipping Norton Town, joined from the Hellenic Football League
- Cradley Town, promoted from Division Two
- Studley Sporting, promoted from Division Two

=== League table ===
Pos	Team	Pld	W	D	L	GF	GA	GD	Pts	Promotion or relegation
1	Bridgnorth Town	38	26	7	5	78	20	+58	59	
2	Moor Green	38	24	8	6	83	39	+44	56	
3	Oldbury United	38	21	8	9	71	41	+30	50	
4	Walsall Sportsco	38	18	13	7	55	36	+19	49	
5	Highgate United	38	18	8	12	65	56	+9	44	
6	Chipping Norton Town	38	16	11	11	56	41	+15	43	
7	Mile Oak Rovers	38	13	16	9	46	42	+4	42	
8	Boldmere St. Michaels	38	14	13	11	51	34	+17	41	
9	Evesham United	38	16	9	13	58	42	+16	41	
10	West Midlands Police	38	16	8	14	52	56	−4	40	
11	Cinderford Town	38	12	15	11	41	41	0	39	
12	Solihull Borough	38	13	10	15	53	63	−10	36	
13	Knowle	38	11	11	16	36	43	−7	33	
14	Coleshill Town	38	12	9	17	42	54	−12	33	
15	Racing Club Warwick	38	8	15	15	31	54	−23	31	
16	Walsall Wood	38	7	15	16	36	57	−21	29	
17	Paget Rangers	38	9	9	20	41	64	−23	27	
18	Cradley Town	38	9	8	21	34	57	−23	26	
19	Studley Sporting	38	6	9	23	40	97	−57	21	Relegated to Division Two
20	Northfield Town	38	5	10	23	31	63	−32	20	Relegated to Division Two

Source: nonleaguematters
Rules for classification: 1) points; 2) goal difference; 3) number of goals scored.
