= 1976–77 Midland Football Combination =

The 1976–77 Midland Football Combination season was the 40th in the history of Midland Football Combination, a football competition in England.

== Division One ==
Midland Football Combination Division One
- Season: 1976–77
- Champions: Blakenall
- Matches: 306
- Goals: 813 (2.66 per match)

Division One featured all the 18 clubs which competed in the division last season, no new clubs joined the division this season.

=== League table ===
Pos	Team	Pld	W	D	L	GF	GA	GD	Pts	Promotion or relegation
1	Blakenall	34	19	10	5	52	24	+28	48	
2	Bridgnorth Town	34	22	4	8	77	36	+41	48	
3	West Midlands Police	34	19	8	7	47	26	+21	46	
4	Cinderford Town	34	16	9	9	59	46	+13	41	
5	Malvern Town	34	16	8	10	44	35	+9	40	
6	Evesham United	34	17	5	12	52	41	+11	39	
7	Sutton Coldfield Town	34	15	8	11	46	35	+11	38	
8	Highgate United	34	13	9	12	44	36	+8	35	
9	Paget Rangers	34	14	7	13	45	45	0	35	
10	Knowle	34	11	10	13	50	52	−2	32	
11	Moor Green	34	13	4	17	46	54	−8	30	
12	Coleshill Town	34	12	6	16	39	54	−15	30	
13	Oldbury United	34	12	5	17	41	49	−8	29	
14	Boldmere St. Michaels	34	12	5	17	38	49	−11	29	
15	Racing Club Warwick	34	8	12	14	33	46	−13	28	
16	Solihull Borough	34	11	4	19	42	65	−23	26	
17	Northfield Town	34	9	7	18	40	58	−18	25	
18	Cadbury Heath	34	2	9	23	18	62	−44	13	Resigned from the league

Source: nonleaguematters
Rules for classification: 1) points; 2) goal difference; 3) number of goals scored.
