= 1984–85 Midland Football Combination =

The 1984–85 Midland Football Combination season was the 48th in the history of Midland Football Combination, a football competition in England.

== Premier Division ==
Midland Football Combination Premier Division
- Season: 1984–85
- Champions: Mile Oak Rovers
- Promoted: Mile Oak Rovers
- Matches: 380
- Goals: 1,160 (3.05 per match)

The Premier Division featured 18 clubs which competed in the division last season along with two new clubs, promoted from Division One:

- New World
- Polesworth North Warwick

=== League table ===
Pos	Team	Pld	W	D	L	GF	GA	GD	Pts	Promotion or relegation
1	Mile Oak Rovers	38	27	6	5	91	28	+63	60	Promoted to the Southern Football League
2	Solihull Borough	38	22	10	6	68	36	+32	54	
3	Paget Rangers	38	21	10	7	60	35	+25	52	
4	Boldmere St. Michaels	38	21	8	9	67	40	+27	50	
5	New World	38	21	6	11	71	41	+30	48	
6	Highgate United	38	20	8	10	73	47	+26	48	
7	Polesworth North Warwick	38	20	8	10	58	34	+24	48	
8	West Midlands Police	38	17	9	12	80	56	+24	43	
9	Stratford Town	38	15	13	10	53	40	+13	43	
10	Racing Club Warwick	38	13	12	13	69	67	+2	38	
11	Walsall Borough	38	13	10	15	47	44	+3	36	
12	Smethwick Highfield	38	10	13	15	50	58	−8	33	
13	Evesham United	38	13	7	18	57	81	−24	33	
14	Hurley Daw Mill Miners Welfare	38	11	9	18	43	56	−13	31	
15	Studley Sporting	38	8	14	16	50	69	−19	30	
16	Northfield Town	38	11	7	20	63	76	−13	29	
17	Coleshill Town	38	10	8	20	44	60	−16	28	
18	Kings Heath	38	7	11	20	31	61	−30	25	
19	Southam United	38	6	5	27	45	102	−57	17	
20	Knowle North Star	38	4	6	28	40	129	−89	14	

Source: nonleaguematters
Rules for classification: 1) points; 2) goal difference; 3) number of goals scored.
