= 1982–83 Midland Football Combination =

The 1982–83 Midland Football Combination season was the 46th in the history of Midland Football Combination, a football competition in England.

== Division One ==
Midland Football Combination Division One
- Season: 1982–83
- Champions: Bridgnorth Town
- Promoted: Bridgnorth Town; Moor Green
- Matches: 380
- Goals: 1,178 (3.1 per match)

Division One featured 19 clubs which competed in the division last season along with one new club:

- Walsall Borough, created by merger of Walsall Sportsco and Walsall Wood

=== League table ===
| Pos | Team | Pld | W | D | L | GF | GA | GD | Pts | Promotion or relegation |
|---|---|---|---|---|---|---|---|---|---|---|
| 1 | Bridgnorth Town | 38 | 29 | 6 | 3 | 102 | 30 | +72 | 64 | Promoted to the Southern League |
| 2 | Moor Green | 38 | 27 | 6 | 5 | 106 | 44 | +62 | 60 | Promoted to the Southern League |
| 3 | Boldmere St. Michaels | 38 | 25 | 7 | 6 | 60 | 36 | +24 | 57 | |
| 4 | Highgate United | 38 | 20 | 12 | 6 | 74 | 38 | +36 | 52 | |
| 5 | Cinderford Town | 38 | 21 | 7 | 10 | 76 | 51 | +25 | 49 | |
| 6 | Paget Rangers | 38 | 17 | 9 | 12 | 63 | 40 | +23 | 43 | |
| 7 | Stratford Town | 38 | 15 | 11 | 12 | 59 | 62 | −3 | 41 | |
| 8 | Mile Oak Rovers | 38 | 15 | 10 | 13 | 58 | 50 | +8 | 40 | |
| 9 | Hurley Daw Mill Miners Welfare | 38 | 13 | 10 | 15 | 60 | 62 | −2 | 36 | |
| 10 | Evesham United | 38 | 13 | 10 | 15 | 52 | 58 | −6 | 36 | |
| 11 | Cradley Town | 38 | 14 | 7 | 17 | 62 | 74 | −12 | 35 | Transferred to the West Midlands (Regional) League |
| 12 | West Midlands Police | 38 | 10 | 13 | 15 | 66 | 73 | −7 | 33 | |
| 13 | Racing Club Warwick | 38 | 12 | 9 | 17 | 52 | 65 | −13 | 33 | |
| 14 | Coleshill Town | 38 | 13 | 7 | 18 | 45 | 58 | −13 | 33 | |
| 15 | Walsall Borough | 38 | 10 | 9 | 19 | 34 | 67 | −33 | 29 | |
| 16 | Smethwick Highfield | 38 | 8 | 12 | 18 | 38 | 58 | −20 | 28 | |
| 17 | Northfield Town | 38 | 10 | 6 | 22 | 53 | 81 | −28 | 26 | |
| 18 | Chipping Norton Town | 38 | 7 | 11 | 20 | 32 | 59 | −27 | 25 | |
| 19 | Solihull Borough | 38 | 6 | 8 | 24 | 43 | 83 | −40 | 20 | |
| 20 | Knowle | 38 | 6 | 8 | 24 | 43 | 89 | −46 | 20 | |

Source: nonleaguematters
Rules for classification: 1) points; 2) goal difference; 3) number of goals scored.
