= 1973–74 Midland Football Combination =

The 1973–74 Midland Football Combination season was the 37th in the history of Midland Football Combination, a football competition in England.

== Division One ==
Midland Football Combination Division One
- Season: 1973–74
- Champions: Highgate United
- Matches: 272
- Goals: 813 (2.99 per match)

Division One featured 17 clubs which competed in the division last season, no new clubs joined the division this season.

=== League table ===
Pos	Team	Pld	W	D	L	GF	GA	GR	Pts
1	Highgate United	32	27	3	2	95	16	5.938	57
2	Malvern Town	32	19	7	6	69	34	2.029	45
3	Solihull Borough	32	17	8	7	58	31	1.871	42
4	Sutton Coldfield Town	32	14	10	8	52	35	1.486	38
5	Blakenall	32	12	14	6	47	32	1.469	38
6	Northfield Town	32	14	8	10	52	49	1.061	36
7	Bridgnorth Town	32	13	9	10	43	35	1.229	35
8	Evesham United	32	13	9	10	54	46	1.174	35
9	Moor Green	32	13	9	10	51	48	1.063	35
10	Racing Club Warwick	32	11	10	11	41	39	1.051	32
11	Paget Rangers	32	13	5	14	48	49	0.980	31
12	Oldbury United	32	11	5	16	40	46	0.870	27
13	West Midlands Police	32	9	5	18	45	53	0.849	23
14	Stratford Town	32	7	7	18	38	66	0.576	21
15	Boldmere St. Michaels	32	7	5	20	31	72	0.431	19
16	Knowle	32	5	5	22	26	85	0.306	15
17	Walsall Wood	32	4	7	21	23	77	0.299	15

Source: nonleaguematters
Rules for classification: 1) points; 2) goal difference; 3) number of goals scored.
