= 1987–88 Midland Football Combination =

The 1987–88 Midland Football Combination season was the 51st in the history of Midland Football Combination, a football competition in England.

== Premier Division ==
Midland Football Combination Premier Division
- Season: 1987–88
- Champions: Racing Club Warwick
- Promoted: Ashtree Highfield
- Relegated: Bloxwich; Wilmcote
- Matches: 342
- Goals: 1,045 (3.06 per match)

The Premier Division featured 17 clubs which competed in the division last season, along with two new clubs:

- Leamington, relegated from the Southern Football League
- Wilmcote, promoted from Division One

=== League table ===
Pos	Team	Pld	W	D	L	GF	GA	GD	Pts	Promotion or relegation
1	Racing Club Warwick	36	22	12	2	74	23	+51	56	
2	Boldmere St. Michaels	36	22	6	8	69	30	+39	50	
3	Ashtree Highfield	36	20	10	6	70	44	+26	50	Promoted to the Southern Football League
4	Stratford Town	36	20	8	8	65	40	+25	48	
5	Evesham United	36	20	6	10	81	47	+34	46	
6	West Midlands Police	36	20	3	13	77	57	+20	43	
7	Coleshill Town	36	16	10	10	61	41	+20	42	
8	Princes End United	36	16	9	11	55	55	0	41	
9	Northfield Town	36	14	12	10	48	40	+8	40	
10	Kings Heath	36	12	12	12	45	50	−5	36	
11	Solihull Borough	36	14	6	16	62	65	−3	34	
12	Bolehall Swifts	36	11	8	17	40	53	−13	30	
13	Walsall Wood	36	10	9	17	51	61	−10	29	
14	Knowle	36	10	8	18	40	60	−20	28	
15	Leamington	36	8	11	17	37	59	−22	27	Resigned from the league
16	Polesworth North Warwick	36	8	8	20	53	85	−32	24	
17	Highgate United	36	9	6	21	44	80	−36	24	
18	Wilmcote	36	5	8	23	28	65	−37	18	Relegated to Division One
19	Bloxwich	36	7	4	25	45	90	−45	18	Relegated to Division One

Source: nonleaguematters
Rules for classification: 1) points; 2) goal difference; 3) number of goals scored.
