= 1983–84 Midland Football Combination =

The 1983–84 Midland Football Combination season was the 47th in the history of Midland Football Combination, a football competition in England.

At the end of the previous season the Midland Combination divisions were renamed, as Division One was renamed the Premier Division, Division Two became Division One and Division Three became Division Two.

== Premier Division ==
Midland Football Combination Premier Division
- Season: 1983–84
- Champions: Studley Sporting
- Matches: 380
- Goals: 1,166 (3.07 per match)

The Premier Division featured 17 clubs which competed in Division One last season along with three new clubs, promoted from Division Two:

- Kings Heath
- Southam United
- Studley Sporting

Also, Knowle changed name to Knowle North Star.

=== League table ===
Pos	Team	Pld	W	D	L	GF	GA	GD	Pts	Promotion or relegation
1	Studley Sporting	38	22	8	8	83	49	+34	52	
2	Coleshill Town	38	22	7	9	77	43	+34	51	
3	West Midlands Police	38	20	10	8	82	52	+30	50	
4	Highgate United	38	17	14	7	70	41	+29	48	
5	Racing Club Warwick	38	21	4	13	79	66	+13	46	
6	Paget Rangers	38	15	15	8	55	35	+20	45	
7	Hurley Daw Mill Miners Welfare	38	16	11	11	68	55	+13	43	
8	Evesham United	38	16	10	12	55	49	+6	42	
9	Stratford Town	38	16	6	16	58	71	−13	38	
10	Boldmere St. Michaels	38	14	9	15	46	37	+9	37	
11	Northfield Town	38	14	9	15	63	56	+7	37	
12	Mile Oak Rovers	38	15	7	16	58	53	+5	37	
13	Solihull Borough	38	15	7	16	54	57	−3	37	
14	Chipping Norton Town	38	13	10	15	49	51	−2	36	Resigned from the league
15	Kings Heath	38	11	14	13	50	59	−9	36	
16	Cinderford Town	38	12	9	17	51	63	−12	33	Resigned to the Gloucestershire County League
17	Walsall Borough	38	13	6	19	54	58	−4	32	
18	Smethwick Highfield	38	7	13	18	45	66	−21	27	
19	Southam United	38	7	8	23	35	76	−41	22	
20	Knowle North Star	38	3	5	30	34	129	−95	11	

Source: nonleaguematters
Rules for classification: 1) points; 2) goal difference; 3) number of goals scored.
