= 1990–91 Midland Football Combination =

The 1990–91 Midland Football Combination season was the 54th in the history of Midland Football Combination, a football competition in England.

== Premier Division ==
Midland Football Combination Premier Division
- Season: 1990–91
- Champions: West Midlands Police
- Promoted: Solihull Borough
- Relegated: Polesworth North Warwick
- Matches: 420
- Goals: 1,178 (2.8 per match)

The Premier Division featured 19 clubs which competed in the division last season, along with two new clubs:

- Kings Norton Ex-Service, promoted from Division One
- Sandwell Borough, relegated from the Southern Football League

=== League table ===
Pos	Team	Pld	W	D	L	GF	GA	GD	Pts	Promotion or relegation
1	West Midlands Police	40	22	14	4	84	41	+43	80	
2	Solihull Borough	40	24	6	10	74	35	+39	78	Promoted to the Southern Football League
3	Evesham United	40	21	11	8	83	46	+37	74	
4	Sandwell Borough	40	20	14	6	63	31	+32	74	
5	Stratford Town	40	19	12	9	81	43	+38	69	
6	Northfield Town	40	18	13	9	63	37	+26	67	
7	Stapenhill	40	18	12	10	60	50	+10	66	
8	Coleshill Town	40	18	11	11	57	42	+15	65	
9	Highgate United	40	18	11	11	48	35	+13	65	
10	Hinckley	40	18	9	13	56	47	+9	63	
11	Walsall Wood	40	17	8	15	53	48	+5	59	
12	Boldmere St. Michaels	40	14	11	15	51	56	−5	53	
13	Kings Heath	40	12	14	14	65	62	+3	50	
14	Knowle	40	14	7	19	47	66	−19	49	
15	Bloxwich Town	40	11	11	18	64	73	−9	44	
16	Bolehall Swifts	40	12	5	23	41	79	−38	41	
17	Mile Oak Rovers	40	9	10	21	40	73	−33	37	
18	Chelmsley Town	40	9	9	22	43	77	−34	36	
19	Princes End United	40	10	6	24	34	71	−37	36	Club folded
20	Polesworth North Warwick	40	5	12	23	39	86	−47	27	Relegated to Division One
21	Kings Norton Ex-Service	40	4	8	28	32	80	−48	20	Resigned from the league

Source: nonleaguematters
Rules for classification: 1) points; 2) goal difference; 3) number of goals scored.
