= 1968–69 Midland Football Combination =

The 1968–69 Midland Football Combination season was the 32nd in the history of Midland Football Combination, a football competition in England.

Also, it was the first season under this name after Worcestershire Combination was renamed to reflect its actual catchment area.

== Division One ==
Midland Football Combination Division One
- Season: 1968–69
- Champions: Evesham United
- Matches: 306
- Goals: 1,155 (3.77 per match)

Division One featured 14 clubs which competed in the Worcestershire Combination Division One last season, along with four new clubs:

- Bridgnorth Town
- Lydbrook Athletic
- Warwickshire Constabulary
- Whitmore Old Boys, promoted from Division Two

=== League table ===
Pos	Team	Pld	W	D	L	GF	GA	GR	Pts
1	Evesham United	34	23	8	3	107	39	2.744	54
2	Alvechurch	34	24	3	7	81	31	2.613	51
3	Oldbury United	34	21	8	5	67	29	2.310	50
4	Paget Rangers	34	23	3	8	69	34	2.029	49
5	Malvern Town	34	21	5	8	101	45	2.244	47
6	Sutton Coldfield Town	34	21	3	10	75	48	1.563	45
7	Moor Green	34	16	7	11	76	61	1.246	39
8	Highgate United	34	16	7	11	79	64	1.234	39
9	Boldmere St. Michaels	34	13	11	10	59	49	1.204	37
10	Jack Mould's Athletic	34	14	6	14	53	53	1.000	34
11	Northfield Town	34	11	7	16	57	61	0.934	29
12	Whitmore Old Boys	34	10	8	16	48	69	0.696	28
13	Lydbrook Athletic	34	10	6	18	48	73	0.658	26
14	Blakenall	34	9	6	19	46	90	0.511	24
15	Bridgnorth Town	34	9	5	20	56	85	0.659	23
16	Smethwick Highfield	34	7	5	22	46	79	0.582	19
17	Walsall Wood	34	6	2	26	38	90	0.422	14
18	Warwickshire Constabulary	34	0	4	30	49	155	0.316	4

Source: nonleaguematters
Rules for classification: 1) points; 2) goal difference; 3) number of goals scored.
