= 1996–97 Midland Football Alliance =

Midland Football Alliance
- Season: 1996–97
- Champions: Blakenall
- Promoted: Blakenall
- Matches: 380
- Goals: 1,115 (2.93 per match)

The 1996–97 Midland Football Alliance season was the third in the history of Midland Football Alliance, a football competition in England.

== Clubs and league table ==
The league featured 17 clubs from the previous season, along with three new clubs:

- Bloxwich Town, promoted from the Midland Football Combination
- Bridgnorth Town, relegated from the Southern Football League
- Pelsall Villa, promoted from the West Midlands (Regional) League

=== League table ===
| Pos | Team | Pld | W | D | L | GF | GA | GD | Pts | Promotion or relegation |
|---|---|---|---|---|---|---|---|---|---|---|
| 1 | Blakenall | 38 | 23 | 11 | 4 | 85 | 39 | +46 | 80 | Promoted to the Southern Football League |
| 2 | Hinckley Athletic | 38 | 22 | 10 | 6 | 77 | 44 | +33 | 76 | Merged with Hinckley Town |
| 3 | Boldmere St. Michaels | 38 | 22 | 7 | 9 | 69 | 41 | +28 | 73 | |
| 4 | Willenhall Town | 38 | 20 | 9 | 9 | 77 | 45 | +32 | 69 | |
| 5 | Barwell | 38 | 17 | 10 | 11 | 65 | 51 | +14 | 61 | |
| 6 | Bridgnorth Town | 38 | 18 | 4 | 16 | 76 | 67 | +9 | 58 | |
| 7 | Rocester | 38 | 16 | 9 | 13 | 62 | 53 | +9 | 57 | |
| 8 | Stratford Town | 38 | 15 | 10 | 13 | 53 | 48 | +5 | 55 | |
| 9 | Bloxwich Town | 38 | 16 | 6 | 16 | 63 | 53 | +10 | 54 | |
| 10 | Oldbury United | 38 | 14 | 11 | 13 | 50 | 43 | +7 | 53 | |
| 11 | Pelsall Villa | 38 | 13 | 9 | 16 | 52 | 70 | −18 | 48 | |
| 12 | Knypersley Victoria | 38 | 11 | 12 | 15 | 42 | 53 | −11 | 45 | |
| 13 | Stapenhill | 38 | 10 | 14 | 14 | 45 | 58 | −13 | 44 | |
| 14 | Shifnal Town | 38 | 11 | 10 | 17 | 45 | 50 | −5 | 43 | |
| 15 | West Midlands Police | 38 | 10 | 11 | 17 | 37 | 60 | −23 | 41 | |
| 16 | Rushall Olympic | 38 | 10 | 10 | 18 | 40 | 59 | −19 | 40 | |
| 17 | Sandwell Borough | 38 | 9 | 13 | 16 | 48 | 69 | −21 | 40 | |
| 18 | Chasetown | 38 | 9 | 12 | 17 | 44 | 65 | −21 | 39 | |
| 19 | Halesowen Harriers | 38 | 8 | 12 | 18 | 44 | 67 | −23 | 36 | |
| 20 | Pershore Town | 38 | 8 | 6 | 24 | 41 | 80 | −39 | 30 | |

Source: fchd
Rules for classification: 1) points; 2) goal difference; 3) number of goals scored.
