= 1974–75 Midland Football Combination =

The 1974–75 Midland Football Combination season was the 38th in the history of Midland Football Combination, a football competition in England.

== Division One ==
Midland Football Combination Division One
- Season: 1974–75
- Champions: Highgate United
- Relegated: Walsall Wood
- Matches: 306
- Goals: 868 (2.84 per match)

Division One featured 17 clubs which competed in the division last season along with one new club:

- Cinderford Town, joined from the Gloucestershire County League

=== League table ===
Pos	Team	Pld	W	D	L	GF	GA	GR	Pts	Promotion or relegation
1	Highgate United	34	22	10	2	71	20	3.550	54	
2	Moor Green	34	22	6	6	67	38	1.763	50	
3	Solihull Borough	34	17	10	7	49	40	1.225	44	
4	Blakenall	34	16	11	7	53	32	1.656	43	
5	Sutton Coldfield Town	34	16	8	10	59	40	1.475	40	
6	Cinderford Town	34	15	8	11	64	44	1.455	38	
7	West Midlands Police	34	15	8	11	42	39	1.077	38	
8	Malvern Town	34	15	7	12	55	39	1.410	37	
9	Northfield Town	34	13	11	10	55	45	1.222	37	
10	Bridgnorth Town	34	12	10	12	43	50	0.860	34	
11	Evesham United	34	13	7	14	54	47	1.149	33	
12	Paget Rangers	34	11	10	13	45	44	1.023	32	
13	Oldbury United	34	12	8	14	45	46	0.978	32	
14	Stratford Town	34	10	7	17	45	64	0.703	27	Transferred to the Hellenic Football League
15	Racing Club Warwick	34	7	8	19	26	59	0.441	22	
16	Knowle	34	7	6	21	42	62	0.677	20	
17	Boldmere St. Michaels	34	6	6	22	30	72	0.417	18	
18	Walsall Wood	34	3	7	24	23	87	0.264	13	Relegated to Division Two

Source: nonleaguematters
Rules for classification: 1) points; 2) goal difference; 3) number of goals scored.
