= 1989–90 Midland Football Combination =

The 1989–90 Midland Football Combination season was the 53rd in the history of Midland Football Combination, a football competition in England.

== Premier Division ==
Midland Football Combination Premier Division
- Season: 1989–90
- Champions: Boldmere St. Michaels
- Relegated: Streetly Celtic
- Matches: 380
- Goals: 1,180 (3.11 per match)

The Premier Division featured 16 clubs which competed in the division last season, along with four new clubs:

- Bloxwich, promoted from Division One, who also changed name to Bloxwich Town
- Mile Oak Rovers, relegated from the Southern Football League
- Stapenhill, joined from the Leicestershire Senior League
- Streetly Celtic, promoted from Division One

=== League table ===
Pos	Team	Pld	W	D	L	GF	GA	GD	Pts	Promotion or relegation
1	Boldmere St. Michaels	38	24	9	5	72	24	+48	81	
2	Northfield Town	38	22	8	8	79	32	+47	74	
3	Evesham United	38	22	7	9	79	44	+35	73	
4	Stapenhill	38	21	7	10	77	35	+42	70	
5	Stratford Town	38	18	9	11	77	50	+27	63	
6	West Midlands Police	38	18	8	12	80	66	+14	62	
7	Bloxwich Town	38	17	9	12	65	62	+3	60	
8	Bolehall Swifts	38	16	6	16	70	58	+12	54	
9	Princes End United	38	14	11	13	68	55	+13	53	
10	Solihull Borough	38	16	3	19	53	52	+1	51	
11	Highgate United	38	12	13	13	46	50	−4	49	
12	Hinckley	38	13	9	16	39	69	−30	48	
13	Chelmsley Town	38	13	6	19	46	66	−20	45	
14	Polesworth North Warwick	38	11	10	17	51	72	−21	43	
15	Kings Heath	38	10	12	16	55	74	−19	42	
16	Coleshill Town	38	11	8	19	38	54	−16	41	
17	Walsall Wood	38	9	12	17	50	73	−23	39	
18	Knowle	38	10	9	19	50	81	−31	39	
19	Mile Oak Rovers	38	8	14	16	47	74	−27	38	
20	Streetly Celtic	38	7	6	25	38	89	−51	27	Relegated to Division One

Source: nonleaguematters
Rules for classification: 1) points; 2) goal difference; 3) number of goals scored.
