= 1998–99 Midland Football Alliance =

Midland Football Alliance
- Season: 1998–99
- Champions: Rocester
- Promoted: Rocester
- Matches: 380
- Goals: 1,104 (2.91 per match)

The 1998–99 Midland Football Alliance season was the fifth in the history of Midland Football Alliance, a football competition in England.

== Clubs and league table ==
The league featured 19 clubs from the previous season, along with one new club:

- Stourport Swifts, promoted from the West Midlands (Regional) League

=== League table ===
Pos	Team	Pld	W	D	L	GF	GA	GD	Pts	Promotion or relegation
1	Rocester	38	25	7	6	80	36	+44	82	Promoted to the Southern Football League
2	Kings Norton Town	38	25	5	8	65	29	+36	80	
3	Oldbury United	38	19	9	10	67	42	+25	66	
4	Boldmere St. Michaels	38	19	8	11	56	49	+7	65	
5	Barwell	38	17	10	11	69	54	+15	61	
6	Halesowen Harriers	38	17	8	13	65	63	+2	59	
7	Rushall Olympic	38	16	10	12	57	44	+13	58	
8	Shifnal Town	38	16	8	14	59	60	−1	56	
9	West Midlands Police	38	15	10	13	50	52	−2	55	
10	Chasetown	38	12	17	9	48	38	+10	53	
11	Bridgnorth Town	38	14	11	13	44	40	+4	53	
12	Stourport Swifts	38	13	11	14	56	50	+6	50	
13	Knypersley Victoria	38	13	8	17	59	61	−2	47	
14	Willenhall Town	38	13	8	17	51	53	−2	47	
15	Wednesfield	38	12	6	20	63	72	−9	42	
16	Pelsall Villa	38	11	7	20	41	67	−26	40	
17	Stapenhill	38	11	5	22	51	82	−31	38	
18	Sandwell Borough	38	10	7	21	37	65	−28	37	
19	Pershore Town	38	8	11	19	47	64	−17	35	
20	Stratford Town	38	7	8	23	39	83	−44	29	

Source: fchd
Rules for classification: 1) points; 2) goal difference; 3) number of goals scored.
