= 1988–89 Midland Football Combination =

The 1988–89 Midland Football Combination season was the 52nd in the history of Midland Football Combination, a football competition in England.

== Premier Division ==
Midland Football Combination Premier Division
- Season: 1988–89
- Champions: Boldmere St. Michaels
- Promoted: Racing Club Warwick
- Relegated: Shirley Town
- Matches: 306
- Goals: 933 (3.05 per match)

The Premier Division featured 15 clubs which competed in the division last season, along with three new clubs:

- Chelmsley Town, promoted from Division One
- Hinckley, joined from the Central Midlands League
- Shirley Town, promoted from Division One

=== League table ===
Pos	Team	Pld	W	D	L	GF	GA	GD	Pts	Promotion or relegation
1	Boldmere St. Michaels	34	23	9	2	76	22	+54	55	
2	Racing Club Warwick	34	22	8	4	77	31	+46	52	Promoted to the Southern Football League
3	Evesham United	34	21	7	6	82	30	+52	49	
4	Princes End United	34	17	9	8	58	37	+21	43	
5	West Midlands Police	34	18	6	10	66	41	+25	42	
6	Northfield Town	34	15	10	9	55	43	+12	40	
7	Stratford Town	34	14	10	10	60	44	+16	38	
8	Walsall Wood	34	13	10	11	49	52	−3	36	
9	Hinckley	34	12	11	11	49	55	−6	35	
10	Highgate United	34	9	15	10	60	61	−1	33	
11	Bolehall Swifts	34	12	8	14	44	55	−11	32	
12	Kings Heath	34	9	11	14	42	52	−10	29	
13	Chelmsley Town	34	10	7	17	37	65	−28	27	
14	Knowle	34	8	10	16	34	58	−24	26	
15	Polesworth North Warwick	34	4	14	16	37	62	−25	22	
16	Coleshill Town	34	8	6	20	46	73	−27	22	
17	Solihull Borough	34	7	6	21	41	72	−31	20	
18	Shirley Town	34	4	3	27	20	80	−60	11	Relegated to Division One

Source: nonleaguematters
Rules for classification: 1) points; 2) goal difference; 3) number of goals scored.
