= Alcester Town F.C. =

Association football club in England

Coordinates: 52.212401°N 1.8536116°W

Alcester Town
- Full name: Alcester Town Football Club
- Nickname: The Romans
- Founded: 1927
- Ground: Stratford Road, Alcester
- Chairman: Steve McAdam
- Manager: Aaron Blackwood
- League: Hellenic League Division One
- 2025–26: Hellenic League Division One, 8th of 18
Home colours

Alcester Town Football Club is a football club based in Alcester, Warwickshire, England. They are currently members of the Hellenic League Division One and play at Stratford Road.

== History ==
The club was established after World War I under the name Alcester Old Boys, as a team for former pupils of Alcester Grammar School. In 1927 they joined Division One of the Stratford League and were renamed Alcester Juniors. In the 1950s the club adopted their current name. They joined the Eastern Division of the Warwickshire Combination in 1962, where they played for three seasons before transferring to Division Two of the Worcestershire Combination in 1965. The league renamed the Midland Combination three years later. In 1971–72 the club were Division Two runners-up, but were not promoted to Division One. Division Two was renamed Division One in 1983.

Alcester were relegated to Division Two at the end of the 1988–89 season. They were promoted back to Division One after finishing as runners-up in Division Two the following season, and went on to win the Division One title in 1990–91, earning promotion to the Premier Division. However, after finishing bottom of the Premier Division in 1992–93, the club folded as they were unable to bring their ground up to the requirements of the league.

The club was re-established in 2007, joining the Stratford Alliance. They were Division Three champions in 2008–09 and were promoted to the Premier Division by 2011. After winning the Premier Division title in 2011–12, the club rejoined the Midland Combination, entering Division Two. When the league merged with the Midland Alliance to form the Midland League in 2014, they were placed in Division Three. The club were Division Three champions in 2018–19, earning promotion to Division Two. At the end of the 2023–24 season they were transferred to the Premier Division of the Herefordshire League.

== Ground ==
The club originally played on a pitch next to Spittle Brook, before moving to one on Bleachfield Street in an area that was known as the 'Soccer Beds'. By the 1950s they had relocated to Stratford Road.

== Honours ==
- Midland League
  - Division Three champions 2018–19
- Midland Combination
  - Division One champions 1990–91
- Stratford Alliance
  - Premier Division champions: 2011–12
  - Division Three champions 2008–09
- Stratford League
  - Division One champions 1927–28

== Records ==
- Best FA Vase performance: First round, 1975–76

== See also ==
- Alcester Town F.C. players
