= 1969–70 Midland Football Combination =

The 1969–70 Midland Football Combination season was the 33rd in the history of Midland Football Combination, a football competition in England.

== Division One ==
Midland Football Combination Division One
- Season: 1969–70
- Champions: Paget Rangers
- Matches: 306
- Goals: 1,062 (3.47 per match)

Division One featured 18 clubs which competed in the division last season, no new clubs joined the division this season.

Also, Warwickshire Constabulary changed name to West Midlands Police.

=== League table ===
Pos	Team	Pld	W	D	L	GF	GA	GR	Pts	Promotion or relegation
1	Paget Rangers	34	23	7	4	97	31	3.129	53	
2	Sutton Coldfield Town	34	21	6	7	75	31	2.419	48	
3	Alvechurch	34	18	11	5	72	35	2.057	47	
4	Evesham United	34	18	9	7	75	43	1.744	45	
5	Malvern Town	34	18	6	10	75	53	1.415	42	
6	Bridgnorth Town	34	17	4	13	78	66	1.182	38	
7	Moor Green	34	11	14	9	57	48	1.188	36	
8	Oldbury United	34	12	11	11	70	48	1.458	35	
9	Jack Mould's Athletic	34	12	10	12	57	56	1.018	34	Resigned to the West Midlands League Division One
10	Blakenall	34	13	8	13	46	58	0.793	34	
11	West Midlands Police	34	13	7	14	51	55	0.927	33	
12	Highgate United	34	12	6	16	58	72	0.806	30	
13	Smethwick Highfield	34	9	8	17	52	66	0.788	26	
14	Northfield Town	34	9	8	17	47	72	0.653	26	
15	Whitmore Old Boys	34	10	6	18	43	79	0.544	26	
16	Boldmere St. Michaels	34	7	9	18	43	72	0.597	23	
17	Walsall Wood	34	7	9	18	33	76	0.434	23	
18	Lydbrook Athletic	34	5	3	26	33	101	0.327	13	Resigned to the Gloucestershire County League

Source: nonleaguematters
Rules for classification: 1) points; 2) goal difference; 3) number of goals scored.
