= 2001–02 Midland Football Alliance =

Midland Football Alliance
- Season: 2001–02
- Champions: Stourbridge
- Promoted: Bromsgrove Rovers
- Matches: 462
- Goals: 1,365 (2.95 per match)

The 2001–02 Midland Football Alliance season was the eighth in the history of Midland Football Alliance, a football competition in England.

== Clubs and league table ==
The league featured 18 clubs from the previous season, along with five new clubs:

- Bromsgrove Rovers, relegated from the Southern Football League
- Ludlow Town, promoted from the West Midlands (Regional) League
- Paget Rangers, relegated from the Southern Football League
- Quorn, promoted from the Leicestershire Senior League
- Studley B K L, promoted from the Midland Football Combination

=== League table ===
Pos	Team	Pld	W	D	L	GF	GA	GD	Pts	Promotion or relegation
1	Stourbridge	42	27	7	8	82	39	+43	88	
2	Bromsgrove Rovers	42	26	9	7	94	41	+53	87	Promoted to the Southern Football League
3	Wednesfield	42	24	9	9	73	39	+34	81	
4	Stratford Town	42	24	7	11	81	49	+32	79	
5	Rushall Olympic	42	22	11	9	81	50	+31	77	
6	Oadby Town	42	21	12	9	78	62	+16	75	
7	Quorn	42	20	10	12	76	55	+21	70	
8	Barwell	42	15	17	10	67	44	+23	62	
9	Studley B K L	42	16	12	14	76	57	+19	60	
10	Ludlow Town	42	15	14	13	58	53	+5	59	
11	Bridgnorth Town	42	18	5	19	74	73	+1	59	
12	Willenhall Town	42	16	9	17	65	62	+3	57	
13	Boldmere St. Michaels	42	15	11	16	43	51	−8	56	
14	Halesowen Harriers	42	16	8	18	56	69	−13	56	
15	Paget Rangers	42	10	19	13	58	55	+3	49	Club folded
16	Stafford Town	42	13	6	23	59	88	−29	45	
17	Pelsall Villa	42	10	12	20	39	70	−31	42	
18	Chasetown	42	9	13	20	43	74	−31	40	
19	Shifnal Town	42	9	10	23	36	77	−41	37	
20	Knypersley Victoria	42	10	5	27	51	82	−31	35	
21	Oldbury United	42	7	11	24	39	77	−38	32	
22	Cradley Town	42	5	11	26	36	98	−62	26	
23	Stapenhill	0	0	0	0	0	0	0	0	Club folded, record expunged

Source: fchd
Rules for classification: 1) points; 2) goal difference; 3) number of goals scored.
