= 1983–84 West Midlands (Regional) League =

The 1983–84 West Midlands (Regional) League season was the 84th in the history of the West Midlands (Regional) League, an English association football competition for semi-professional and amateur teams based in the West Midlands county, Shropshire, Herefordshire, Worcestershire and southern Staffordshire.

== Premier Division ==
West Midlands League Premier Division
- Season: 1983–84
- Champions: Halesowen Town
- Promoted: Hednesford Town
- Matches: 380
- Goals: 1,149 (3.02 per match)

The Premier Division featured 17 clubs which competed in the division last season, along with three new clubs:

- Chasetown, promoted from Division One
- Cradley Town, transferred from the Midland Combination
- GKN Sankeys, promoted from Division One

Also, Bilston was renamed Bilston Town.

=== League table ===
Pos	Team	Pld	W	D	L	GF	GA	GD	Pts	Promotion or relegation
1	Halesowen Town	38	32	3	3	112	36	+76	67	
2	Hednesford Town	38	23	10	5	70	34	+36	56	Promoted to the Southern League
3	Atherstone United	38	17	11	10	63	44	+19	45	
4	Gresley Rovers	38	17	9	12	68	61	+7	43	
5	Lye Town	38	15	12	11	55	45	+10	42	
6	Wolverhampton United	38	17	7	14	53	55	−2	41	
7	Oldswinford	38	15	11	12	61	64	−3	41	
8	Armitage	38	17	5	16	67	61	+6	39	
9	Shifnal Town	38	13	12	13	59	56	+3	38	
10	Wednesfield Social	38	15	8	15	52	58	−6	38	
11	Tividale	38	12	12	14	53	48	+5	36	
12	Malvern Town	38	14	7	17	64	61	+3	35	
13	Rushall Olympic	38	11	11	16	55	59	−4	33	
14	Hinckley Athletic	38	12	9	17	51	61	−10	33	
15	GKN Sankeys	38	13	7	18	54	74	−20	33	
16	Brereton Social	38	10	12	16	46	62	−16	32	
17	Bilston Town	38	10	11	17	44	58	−14	31	
18	Blakenall	38	11	7	20	39	59	−20	29	
19	Chasetown	38	9	8	21	39	81	−42	26	
20	Cradley Town	38	9	4	25	44	72	−28	22	Relegated to Division One

Source: nonleaguematters
Rules for classification: 1) points; 2) goal difference; 3) number of goals scored.
