= Central Amateur League =

English football league

The Central Amateur League was an amateur football league in England, affiliated to the Amateur Football Alliance. It was established in 1935 with eight clubs, growing to twelve clubs in the 1937–38 season. The league folded in 1950; Ibstock Penistone Rovers were the only club to play in the league for every season of its existence.

Clubs from the league won the AFA Senior Cup in 1938–39 and 1947–48.

== List of champions ==
- 1935–36: Northampton Mount Pleasant
- 1936–37: Moor Green
- 1937–38: Moor Green
- 1938–39: Moor Green
- 1946–47: Boldmere St. Michaels
- 1947–48: Rugby Oakfield
- 1948–49: Boldmere St. Michaels
- 1949–50: Ibstock Penistone Rovers

== Member clubs ==
- Badsey Rangers (1936–1939)
- Banbury Spencer (1935–1936)
- Bedford Avenue (1948–1950)
- Bedworth Town (1936–1937)
- Boldmere St. Michaels (1937–1949)
- Bourneville Athletic (1946–1948)
- Coalville Town (1936–1948)
- Coventry Amateurs (1946–1950)
- Coventry Morris Motors (1936–1947)
- Evesham Town Amateurs (1949–1950)
- Huntingdon United (1949–1950)
- Ibstock Penistone Rovers (1935–1950)
- Leicester University (1949–1950)
- Leicester YMCA (1946–1947)
- Leicestershire Nomads (1935–1939)
- Lockheed Leamington (1947–1949)
- Loughborough Colleges (1936–1939)
- Lye Town (1946–1947)
- Moor Green (1936–1939)
- North Derbyshire Ramblers (1935–1936)
- Northampton Amateurs (1946–1950)
- Northampton Mount Pleasant (1935–1939)
- Northampton Nomads (1935–1939)
- Nuneaton Borough (1937–1938)
- Oakham Rovers (1947–1949)
- Paget Rangers (1949–1950)
- RAF Cranwell (1935–1939)
- RAF Upper Heyford (1935–1936)
- Redditch High Duty Alloys (1947–1948)
- Rugby Oakfield (1946–1948)
- Smethwick Highfield (1946–1948)
- St Ives Town (1949–1950)
- Warwick Town (1948–1950)
- Whitwick Colliery (1948–1949)
