= 1999–2000 Midland Football Combination =

The 1999–2000 Midland Football Combination season was the 63rd in the history of Midland Football Combination, a football competition in England.

== Premier Division ==
Midland Football Combination Premier Division
- Season: 1999–2000
- Champions: Nuneaton Griff
- Relegated: Coleshill Town; Kenilworth Town
- Matches: 380
- Goals: 1,373 (3.61 per match)

The Premier Division featured 17 clubs which competed in the division last season, along with three new clubs:

- Blackheath Electrodrives, promoted from Division One
- Northfield Town, promoted from Division One
- Nuneaton Griff, joined from the Coventry Alliance Football League

Also:

- GPT Coventry changed name to Marconi

=== League table ===
Pos	Team	Pld	W	D	L	GF	GA	GD	Pts	Promotion or relegation
1	Nuneaton Griff	38	25	10	3	118	41	+77	85	
2	Kings Heath	38	22	10	6	79	42	+37	76	
3	Studley BKL	38	21	7	10	85	50	+35	70	
4	Marconi	38	20	9	9	81	51	+30	69	
5	Meir KA	38	18	10	10	81	48	+33	64	
6	Coventry Sphinx	38	18	7	13	69	47	+22	61	
7	Massey Ferguson	38	17	10	11	75	59	+16	61	
8	Cheslyn Hay	38	17	9	12	82	60	+22	60	
9	Feckenham	38	16	11	11	60	47	+13	59	
10	Alvechurch	38	17	8	13	74	77	−3	59	
11	Continental Star	38	14	11	13	62	75	−13	53	
12	Handrahan Timbers	38	15	7	16	51	61	−10	52	
13	Northfield Town	38	15	6	17	57	57	0	51	
14	Bolehall Swifts	38	14	8	16	90	63	+27	50	
15	Blackheath Electrodrives	38	13	9	16	54	73	−19	48	
16	Southam United	38	11	8	19	64	78	−14	41	
17	Alveston	38	11	5	22	52	93	−41	38	
18	Highgate United	38	8	7	23	53	88	−35	31	
19	Coleshill Town	38	5	5	28	52	124	−72	17 (Note: Coleshill Town deducted 3 points.)	Relegated to Division One
20	Kenilworth Town	38	3	3	32	34	139	−105	12	Relegated to Division One

Source: nonleaguematters
Rules for classification: 1) points; 2) goal difference; 3) number of goals scored.
