= 1978–79 Hellenic Football League =

The 1978–79 Hellenic Football League season was the 26th in the history of the Hellenic Football League, a football competition in England. From this season the Hellenic League used again two points for a win.

== Premier Division ==
Hellenic Football League Premier Division
- Season: 1978–79
- Champions: Newbury Town
- Matches: 182
- Goals: 574 (3.15 per match)

The Premier Division featured twelve clubs which competed in the division last season, along with two new clubs, promoted from Division One:

- Bicester Town
- Garrard Athletic

=== League table ===
Pos	Team	Pld	W	D	L	GF	GA	GR	Pts	Promotion or relegation
1	Newbury Town	26	14	8	4	52	31	1.677	36	
2	Fairford Town	26	14	7	5	53	39	1.359	35	
3	Forest Green Rovers	26	15	4	7	52	35	1.486	34	
4	Thame United	26	15	3	8	37	26	1.423	33	
5	Bicester Town	26	12	9	5	47	38	1.237	33	
6	Chipping Norton Town	26	14	4	8	51	27	1.889	32	Transferred to the Midland Combination
7	Moreton Town	26	12	7	7	42	31	1.355	31	
8	Flackwell Heath	26	10	8	8	37	33	1.121	28	
9	Clanfield	26	9	4	13	36	47	0.766	22	
10	Wallingford Town	26	8	4	14	41	48	0.854	20	
11	Abingdon Town	26	6	7	13	34	51	0.667	19	
12	Didcot Town	26	4	9	13	33	52	0.635	17	
13	Garrard Athletic	26	4	8	14	35	51	0.686	16	Resigned from the league
14	Abingdon United	26	2	4	20	24	65	0.369	8	

Source: rsssf
Rules for classification: 1) points; 2) goal ratio; 3) number of goals scored.

== Division One ==
Hellenic Football League Division One
- Season: 1978–79
- Champions: Northwood
- Promoted: Northwood; Kidlington; Morris Motors

The Division One featured 14 clubs which competed in the division last season, along with 4 new clubs:

- Thatcham Town, relegated from the Premier Division
- Cirencester Town, relegated from the Premier Division
- Northwood, joined from the Middlesex County Senior League
- Rayners Lane

=== League table ===
Pos	Team	Pld	W	D	L	GF	GA	GR	Pts	Promotion or relegation
1	Northwood	34	27	2	5	110	24	4.583	56	Promoted to the Premier Division
2	Kidlington	34	24	4	6	87	35	2.486	52	Promoted to the Premier Division
3	Morris Motors	34	22	6	6	86	34	2.529	50	Promoted to the Premier Division
4	Maidenhead Town	34	23	2	9	72	36	2.000	48	
5	Rivet Sports	34	17	10	7	53	38	1.395	44	
6	Lambourn Sports	34	17	8	9	86	58	1.483	42	
7	Hazells	34	16	8	10	62	45	1.378	40	
8	Thatcham Town	34	15	7	12	67	56	1.196	37	
9	Rayners Lane	34	13	7	14	63	67	0.940	33	
10	Easington Sports	34	12	7	15	60	66	0.909	31	
11	Cirencester Town	33	13	5	15	45	66	0.682	31	
12	Brackley Town	34	8	14	12	42	36	1.167	30	
13	Ruislip Town	33	10	6	17	51	64	0.797	26	
14	Pressed Steel	34	8	10	16	57	76	0.750	26	
15	Dowty Staverton	34	8	4	22	34	84	0.405	20	
16	Aston Clinton	34	7	4	23	47	90	0.522	18	
17	Wantage Town	34	6	5	23	45	94	0.479	17	
18	Buckingham Athletic	34	3	3	28	28	126	0.222	9	Resigned from the league

Source: nonleaguematters
Rules for classification: 1) points; 2) goal ratio; 3) number of goals scored.
