= 2000–01 Midland Football Combination =

The 2000–01 Midland Football Combination season was the 64th in the history of Midland Football Combination, a football competition in England.

== Premier Division ==
Midland Football Combination Premier Division
- Season: 2000–01
- Champions: Nuneaton Griff
- Promoted: Studley B K L
- Relegated: Blackheath Invensys; Northfield Town
- Matches: 419
- Goals: 1,399 (3.34 per match)

The Premier Division featured 18 clubs which competed in the division last season, along with three new clubs:

- Clubs promoted from Division One:
  - Brookvale Athletic, who also changed name to Sutton Town
  - Romulus
- Plus:
  - Pershore Town, relegated from the Midland Football Alliance

Also:

- Marconi changed name to Coventry Marconi
- Blackheath Electrodrives changed name to Blackheath Invensys

=== League table ===
Pos	Team	Pld	W	D	L	GF	GA	GD	Pts	Promotion or relegation
1	Nuneaton Griff	40	31	4	5	93	34	+59	97	
2	Studley BKL	40	30	6	4	98	32	+66	96	Promoted to the Midland Football Alliance
3	Romulus	40	27	7	6	79	34	+45	88	
4	Pershore Town	40	22	8	10	82	62	+20	74	
5	Coventry Sphinx	39	20	6	13	63	38	+25	66	
6	Meir KA	39	20	6	13	67	53	+14	66	
7	Alvechurch	40	21	3	16	77	64	+13	66	
8	Coventry Marconi	40	19	8	13	87	61	+26	65	
9	Kings Heath	40	15	12	13	61	53	+8	57	
10	Sutton Town	40	16	7	17	67	57	+10	55	
11	Massey Ferguson	40	15	8	17	81	81	0	53	
12	Bolehall Swifts	40	15	9	16	77	76	+1	45 (Note: Bolehall Swifts deducted 9 points.)	
13	Handrahan Timbers	40	12	7	21	51	69	−18	43	
14	Cheslyn Hay	40	11	9	20	53	71	−18	42	
15	Alveston	40	11	9	20	53	87	−34	42	
16	Feckenham	40	9	11	20	49	80	−31	38	
17	Blackheath Invensys	40	10	7	23	51	91	−40	37	Relegated to Division One
18	Highgate United	40	11	4	25	49	96	−47	37	
19	Northfield Town	40	8	12	20	44	83	−39	36	Relegated to Division One
20	Southam United	40	10	5	25	53	79	−26	32 (Note: Southam United deducted 3 points.)	
21	Continental Star	40	10	4	26	64	98	−34	31 (Note: Continental Star deducted 3 points.)	

Source: nonleaguematters
Rules for classification: 1) points; 2) goal difference; 3) number of goals scored.
