= Midland Football Combination =

- Founded: 1927
- Folded: 2014
- Country: England
- Divisions: 3 (not including Reserve Divisions)
- Level on pyramid: Levels 10–11 (Premier Division; Division One)
- Feeder to: Midland Football Alliance
- League cup(s): President's Cup; Challenge Vase; Challenge Urn; Challenge Trophy; Jack Mould Trophy; Challenge Bowl
- Last champions: Brocton (2013–14)
- Most championships: Evesham United (6)

The Midland Football Combination was an English football league covering parts of the West Midlands. It comprised five divisions, a Premier Division, Divisions One and Two and two Reserves Divisions. The league was one of three official feeder leagues to the Midland Football Alliance.

Prior to 2006, the Premier Division was defined as step 7 in the National League System, even though it fed into the step 5 Midland Alliance. In 2006, it was re-graded as step 6, making teams in the top two divisions eligible to take part in the FA Vase and teams in the top division eligible to enter the FA Cup. The league merged with the Midland Football Alliance in 2014 to form the new Midland Football League.

== History ==
The league was founded in 1927 as the Worcestershire Combination. The ten founder members were Oldbury Town, Stourbridge Reserves, Kidderminster Harriers Reserves, Bewdley, Blackheath Town, Halesowen Labour, Highley Colliers, Old Carolians, Stewart & Lloyds (Bilston) and Cookley St Peters. By the 1929–30 season four of the founding clubs had dropped out and the league had been reduced to just six teams, with the result that it held two separate competitions within the one season to bulk out the fixture list, but it then gained eight new teams and continued to expand.

The league changed its name to the Midland Combination in 1968 to reflect the drawing of clubs from a wider area.

In the 2007–08 season, the league's representative team, drawn from clubs in Division One, reached the final of the FA National League System Cup.

== League champions ==
=== Worcestershire Combination ===
Initially the league consisted of a single division

Season	Champions
1927–28	Blackheath Town
1928–29	Blackheath Town

Due to the number of teams having dropped dramatically, the 1929–30 season consisted of two separate "half-season" leagues.

Season	First series	Second series
1929–30	Halesowen Labour	Dudley Town

For the 1930–31 the league reverted to its standard format.

Season	Champions
1930–31	Halesowen Labour
1931–32	Dudley Town
1932–33	Tarmac
1933–34	Woodside Wanderers
1934–35	Catshill Village Hall
1935–36	Lye Town
1936–37	Catshill Village Hall
1937–38	Catshill Village Hall
1938–39	Catshill Village Hall

The league closed down in 1939 due to the outbreak of the Second World War and did not begin again until 1948.

Season	Champions
1948–49	Jack Mould's Athletic
1949–50	Bourneville Athletic
1950–51	Jack Mould's Athletic
1951–52	Walsall Wood
1952–53	Evesham United
1953–54	Brierley Hill Alliance Reserves
1954–55	Evesham United
1955–56	Malvern Town
1956–57	Stratford Town
1957–58	Wolverhampton Wanderers 'B'
1958–59	Shelfield Athletic
1959–60	Paget Rangers
1960–61	Paget Rangers

For the 1960–61 season the league added a second division, with the existing division renamed Division One.

Season	Division One	Division Two
1961–62	Allens Cross	Allens Cross Reserves
1962–63	Alvechurch	Hall Green Amateurs
1963–64	Hall Green Amateurs	Castle Rovers
1964–65	Alvechurch	Hall Green Amateurs Reserves
1965–66	Evesham United	Alvechurch Reserves
1966–67	Alvechurch	Highgate United Reserves
1967–68	Evesham United	Whitmore Old Boys

=== Midland Combination ===
Season	Division One	Division Two
1968–69	Evesham United	Highgate United Reserves
1969–70	Paget Rangers	Coleshill Town
1970–71	Paget Rangers	Solihull Town
1971–72	Alvechurch	Highgate United Reserves
1972–73	Highgate United	Albion Haden United
1973–74	Highgate United	Astwood Bank Rovers
1974–75	Highgate United	Whitmore Old Boys
1975–76	Northfield Town	Whitmore Old Boys
1976–77	Blakenall	Astwood Bank Rovers
1977–78	Sutton Coldfield Town	Hurley Daw Mill Welfare
1978–79	Sutton Coldfield Town	Stafford

For the 1979–80 season a third division was added.

Season	Division One	Division Two	Division Three
1979–80	Bridgnorth Town	Hurley Daw Mill Welfare	Sheldon Promovere
1980–81	Moor Green	Sheldon Promovere	Southam United
1981–82	Chipping Norton Town	Bedworth United Reserves	Paget Rangers Reserves
1982–83	Bridgnorth Town	Studley Sporting	Bridgnorth Town Reserves

For the 1983–84 season the divisions were renamed to Premier, One and Two.

Season	Premier Division	Division One	Division Two
1983–84	Studley Sporting	New World	Kingswinford Town
1984–85	Mile Oak Rovers	Cheltenham Town Reserves	Bolehall Swifts
1985–86	Boldmere St Michaels	Moor Green Reserves	Stratford Town Reserves
1986–87	Stratford Town	Wilmcote	Bromsgrove Athletic
1987–88	Racing Club Warwick	Chelmsley Town	West Midlands Fire Service
1988–89	Boldmere St Michaels	Bloxwich	Upton Town
1989–90	Boldmere St Michaels	Stapenhill Reserves	Pershore Town
1990–91	West Midlands Police	Alcester Town	Badsey Rangers
1991–92	Evesham United	Studley BKL	Marston Green
1992–93	Armitage 90	Wellesbourne	Ansells

For the 1993–94 season Division Three was added.

Season	Premier Division	Division One	Division Two	Division Three
1993–94	Pershore Town	West Midlands Fire Service	Massey Ferguson	Albright & Wilson
1994–95	Northfield Town	Massey Ferguson	Richmond Swifts	West Midland Police Reserves
1995–96	Bloxwich Town	Richmond Swifts	Continental Star	Feckenham
1996–97	Kings Norton Town	GPT Coventry	Feckenham	Swan Sports
1997–98	Worcester Athletico	Alveston	Blackheath Electrodrives	Old Hill Town
1998–99	Alveston	Northfield Town	Fairfield Villa	MCL Claines
1999–2000	Nuneaton Griff	Brookvale Athletic	Wyle Forest	Wilmcote S & S
2000–01	Nuneaton Griff	Shirley Town	Leamington	West Hagley
2001–02	Grosvenor Park	Rugby United	Burman Hi-Ton	Littleton
2002–03	Alvechurch	Knowle	Barnt Green Spartak	Wellesbourne
2003–04	Romulus	Barnt Green Spartak	Wellesbourne	University of Birmingham
2004–05	Leamington	Atherstone Town	Archdale	Coton Green
2005–06	Atherstone Town	Knowle	Bartley Green	Halesowen Town Reserves
2006–07	Coventry Sphinx	Bartley Green	Wernley Athletic	Castle Vale JKS
2007–08	Coleshill Town	Knowle	Castle Vale JKS	GSA & Smethwick Town
2008–09	Loughborough University	Castle Vale JKS	Shirley Town	Hampton
2009–10	Heath Hayes	Stockingford Allotments Association	Hampton	Blackwood
2010–11	Heather St. John's	Earlswood Town	Blackwood	Polesworth

For the 2011–12 season Division Three was disbanded.

Season	Premier Division	Division One	Division Two
2011–12	Continental Star	Blackwood	Aston
2012–13	Walsall Wood	Alvis Sporting Club	Barnt Green Spartak
2013–14	Brocton	Cadbury Athletic	Kenilworth Town

== Final members ==
The teams that competed in the Combination's first team divisions in the 2013–14 season were as follows:

=== Premier Division ===
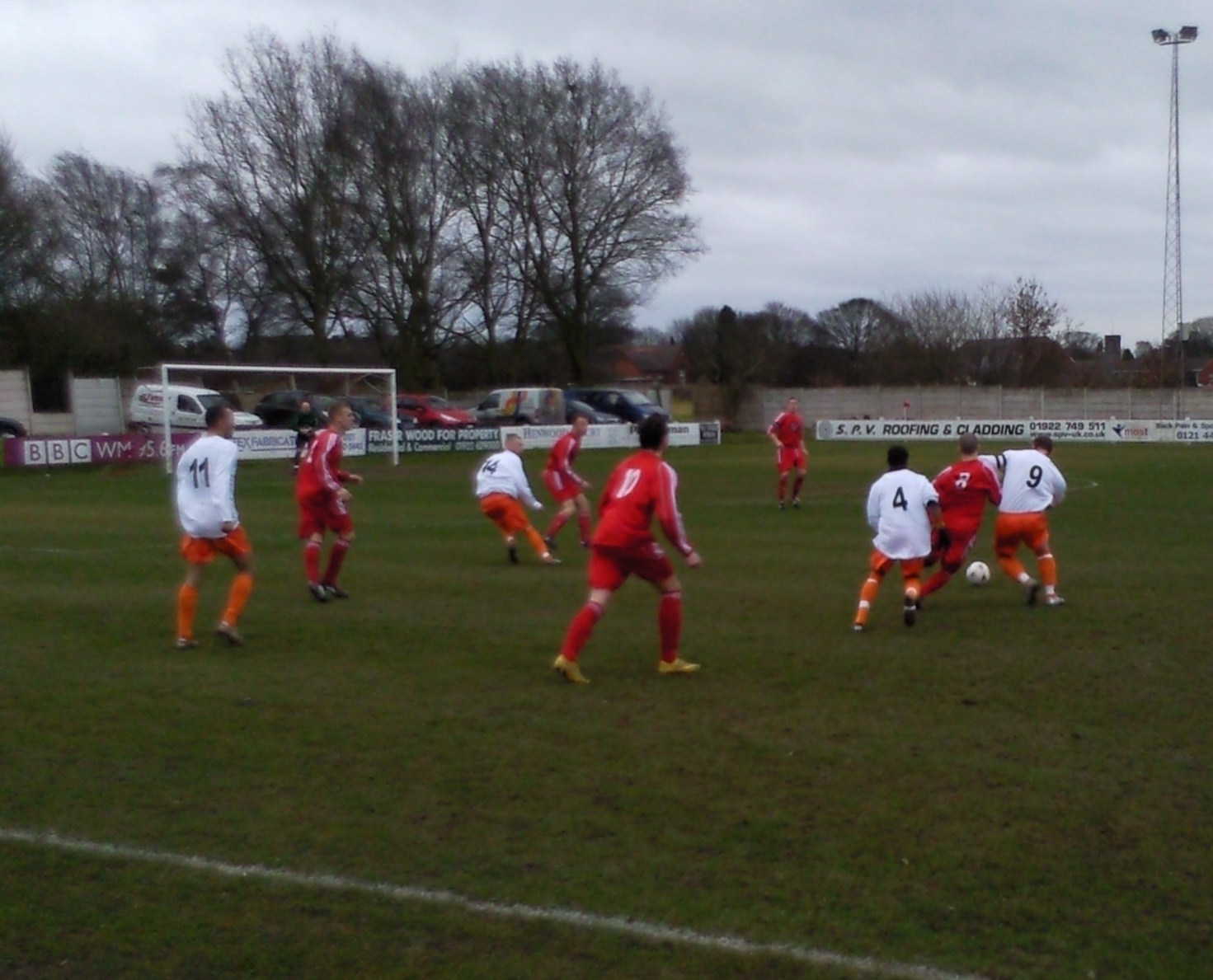
Walsall Wood (red shirts) in action against Racing Club Warwick

- Alvis Sporting Club
- Atherstone Town
- Blackwood
- Bolehall Swifts
- Brocton
- Bromsgrove Sporting
- Castle Vale JKS – record expunged
- Coventry Copsewood
- Earlswood Town
- Lichfield City
- Littleton
- Nuneaton Griff
- Pelsall Villa
- Pershore Town
- Pilkington XXX
- Racing Club Warwick
- Southam United
- Stafford Town
- Studley

=== Division One ===
- Aston
- Barnt Green Spartak
- Cadbury Athletic
- Chelmsley Town
- Coton Green
- Droitwich Spa
- Fairfield Villa
- Feckenham
- FC Glades Sporting
- Hampton
- Knowle
- Phoenix United
- Shirley Town
- Sutton United
- West Midlands Police

=== Division Two ===
- Alcester Town
- Austrey Rangers
- Badsey Rangers
- Barton United
- Burntwood Town
- Coventry United
- Enville Athletic
- FC Stratford
- Inkberrow
- Kenilworth Town
- Leamington Hibernian
- Northfield Town
- Paget Rangers
- Perrywood
- Polesworth
- Rostance Edwards
- Rugeley Rangers – record expunged

== Cup competitions ==
Each division other than the Premier had its own knockout competition, Division One competing for the President's Cup, Division Two for the Challenge Vase, Division Three for the Challenge Urn, and the Reserve Division for the Challenge Trophy. There were also other cup competitions run by the Midland Football Combination for its members including the Jack Mould Trophy and the Challenge Bowl.
