= Midland Football Alliance =

English football league, 1994–2014

- Founded: 1994
- Folded: 2014
- Country: England
- Level on pyramid: Level 8 (1994–04); Level 9 (2004–14)
- Feeder to: Southern League Division One Central; Northern Premier League Division One South
- Relegation to: West Midlands (Regional) League; Premier Division; Midland Combination; Premier Division
- Domestic cup(s): League Cup; Joe McGorian Cup
- Last champions: Tividale (2013–14)
- Most championships: Rocester, Stourbridge (2)
- Website: Midland Alliance

The Midland Football Alliance was an English association football league for semi-professional teams. It covered Leicestershire, Shropshire, Staffordshire, Warwickshire, West Midlands, Worcestershire and also southern parts of Derbyshire and Nottinghamshire. The league consisted of a single division which sat at Step 5 of the National League System, or the ninth level of the overall English football league system.

The league was formed in 1994, drawing its initial membership from the strongest clubs in the Midland Football Combination and the West Midlands (Regional) League, both of which became feeder leagues to the new competition. Each season, the champion club of each feeder league was eligible for promotion to the Alliance, and Alliance clubs could in turn be relegated to the feeder leagues. Successful teams in the Alliance were eligible for promotion to a Step 4 league, either the Southern League or Northern Premier League depending on geographical considerations. The league merged with the Midland Combination in 2014 to form the new Midland Football League.

== History ==
The Alliance was formed in 1994, taking its initial member clubs from the West Midlands (Regional) League and the Midland Football Combination, which had existed since before the Second World War, having originally been formed as the Birmingham & District League and the Worcestershire Combination respectively. Their catchment areas had gradually converged, and by the early 1990s the standard of play and geographical coverage of the two competitions were considered to be similar enough that a new competition was formed to cater for the best clubs previously split across the two leagues.

The league drew ten member clubs from each of the two leagues for its inaugural season. The clubs selected to join from the Midland Combination were Barwell, Boldmere St Michaels, Bolehall Swifts, Pershore Town, Sandwell Borough, Shepshed Dynamo, Shifnal Town, Stapenhill, Stratford Town and West Midlands Police. Those selected from the West Midlands (Regional) League were Brierley Hill Town, Chasetown, Halesowen Harriers, Hinckley Athletic, Knypersley Victoria, Oldbury United, Paget Rangers, Rocester, Rushall Olympic and Willenhall Town. Paget Rangers won the first league championship by a margin of 12 points from Hinckley Athletic in the 1994–95 season, and gained promotion to the Southern League. The Alliance's status as a feeder to the Southern League was cemented when Armitage 90 were relegated in the opposite direction. Armitage went on to dominate the league in the 1995–96 season but disbanded midway through the season, with the result that their record was expunged from the table.

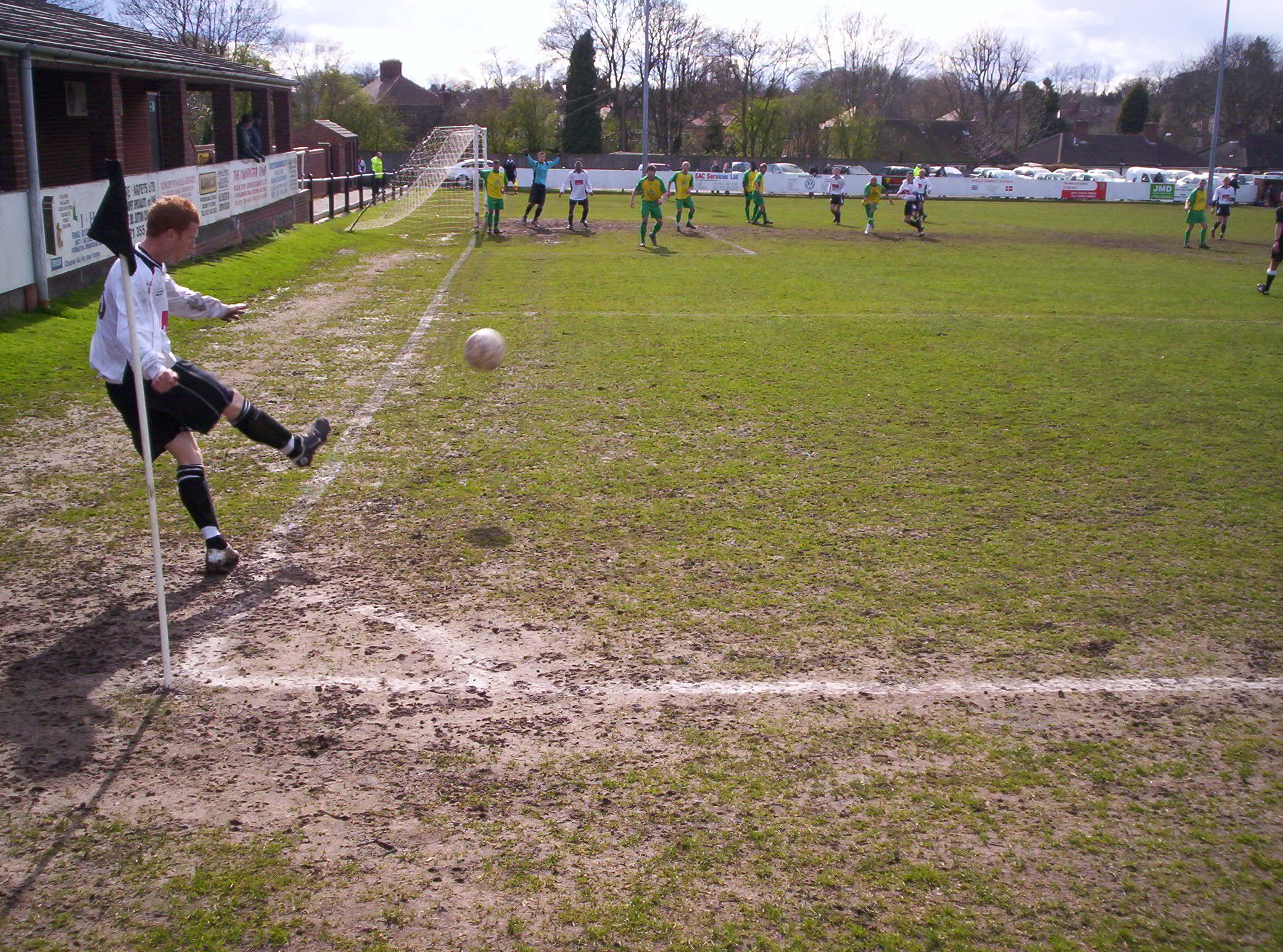
Midland Alliance action from 2008, as Boldmere St Michaels (white shirts) take on Barwell

For the 1999–2000 season the league increased in size to 22 clubs when two clubs were promoted into the Alliance but none relegated out of it. One of the promoted clubs was Oadby Town of the Leicestershire Senior League, the first time a team from that league had been promoted into the Alliance. Two years later, the league increased in size to 23 clubs as more teams joined than left, but Stapenhill resigned midway through the 2001–02 season, reverting the number of clubs in the competition back to 22. The league expanded to 24 clubs for the 2003–04 season, at the end of which, for the first time, Alliance clubs were promoted to the Northern Premier League, rather than the Southern League, when Rocester and Willenhall Town joined the more northerly of the two leagues. The following season Coalville Town became the first Alliance team to reach the first round proper of the FA Cup, a feat which was repeated in the 2005–06 season by both Chasetown and Leamington.

With the creation of the National League System by the Football Association the league was officially defined as a Step 5 league. The champions of the Midland Combination, West Midlands (Regional) League and Leicestershire Senior League continued to gain promotion to the Alliance, although in 2008 the new East Midlands Counties Football League was formed at the Step 6 level and it was anticipated that successful teams from the Leicestershire Senior League, which is officially a Step 7 league, would now move up to the new league and that the champions of the new league would in turn move up to the Alliance if they fell within its coverage area.

In 2014 the Alliance merged with the Midland Combination to form the new Midland Football League. The clubs which had been members of the Alliance formed the Premier Division of the new league.

== Structure ==
The Alliance was known under various sponsored names following deals with companies including Baker-Joiner, Polymac Services, Harvey World Travel, Travel Factory, and Aspire. In July 2008, it was announced that 23 teams would compete in the Alliance in the 2008–09 season, however the following week it was announced that Stapenhill had folded, leaving 22 teams in the league. The league was contested on a double round-robin basis, with each team playing each of the other teams in the division once at home and once away. Three points were awarded for a win, one for a draw and zero for a defeat. Goal difference was used to separate teams on the same points.

As the Alliance was a Step 5 league, its member clubs were eligible to take part in the FA Cup and FA Vase as long as their grounds met the required standards. The league also operated two cup competitions of its own, the knock-out League Cup, which was staged every season, and the Joe McGorian Cup, which was contested between the previous season's League Cup winners and league champions and which was first contested in 1996.

According to official FA regulations, clubs from the Alliance were eligible for promotion to a Step 4 league, provided their grounds met the required standard. Clubs promoted from Step 5 leagues were placed in the most geographically appropriate Step 4 leagues as determined by the FA's Leagues Committee. The number of clubs promoted from the Alliance each season could vary, as regulations stated that the "ten most suitable clubs from the leagues at Step 5" will gain promotion. All clubs gaining promotion from the Alliance were placed in either the Southern League or the Northern Premier League. Teams finishing at the bottom of the Alliance table could be relegated to an appropriate feeder league, depending on the number of teams remaining in the division after other promotion and relegation issues have been resolved.

== Attendance ==
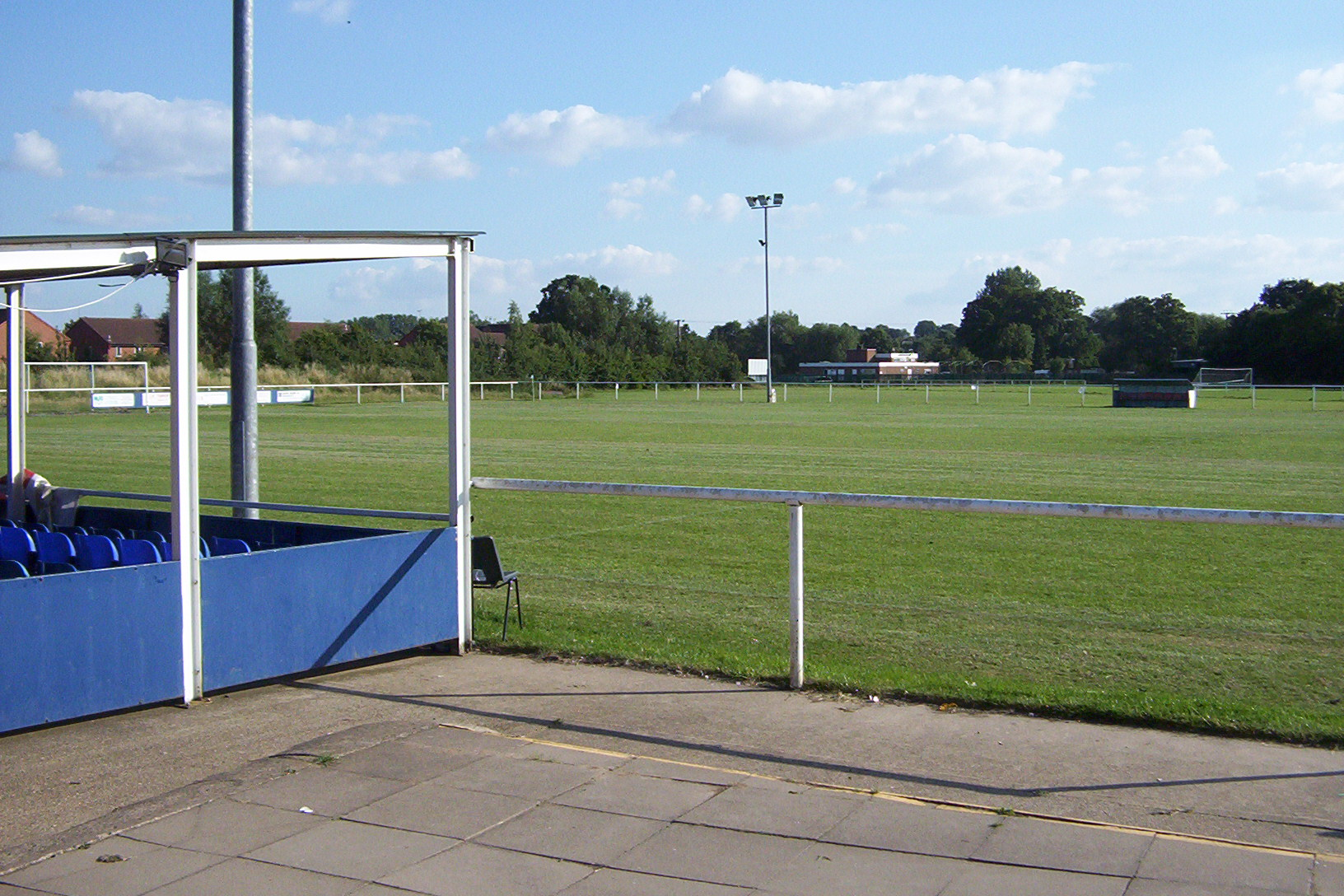
The Beehive, home of Studley, where the average attendance in the 2007–08 season was 79

Attendances at Midland Alliance matches were generally small, with many matches attracting fewer than 100 spectators. In the 2006–07 season the average attendance across the league was 124, but in the 2007–08 season this fell to 87. The best supported team in that season was Atherstone Town, whose average home attendance was 162. The worst supported team was Oldbury United whose matches drew an average of only 39 spectators. The highest attendance for a single match was 411, for the match between Stratford Town and Barwell. Barwell also took part in the match with the lowest attendance, when their game away to Oldbury United drew only 20 spectators.

The largest crowd ever registered for an Alliance match was 1,280, for the match between Racing Club Warwick and local rivals Leamington on 26 December 2005. The smallest crowd recorded was 10, for a match between Wednesfield and Biddulph Victoria on 19 April 2003.

== Champions and cup-winners ==
The area covered by the Midland Alliance is coloured mid blue.

The league champions and clubs promoted from the league were as follows:

Season	Champions	Promoted	
Season	Champions	Club	League
1994–95	Paget Rangers	Paget Rangers	SFL Midland Division
1995–96	Shepshed Dynamo	Shepshed Dynamo	SFL Midland Division
1996–97	Blakenall	Blakenall	SFL Midland Division
1997–98	Bloxwich Town	Bloxwich Town	SFL Midland Division
1998–99	Rocester	Rocester	SFL Division One West
1999–2000	Oadby Town	–	
2000–01	Stourport Swifts	Stourport Swifts	SFL Division One West
2001–02	Stourbridge	Bromsgrove Rovers	SFL Division One West
2002–03	Stourbridge	–	
2003–04	Rocester	Rocester; Willenhall Town	NPL Division One
2004–05	Rushall Olympic	Rushall Olympic	SFL Division One West
2005–06	Chasetown	Chasetown; Stourbridge; Malvern Town	SFL Division One Midlands
2006–07	Leamington	Leamington; Romulus; Quorn	SFL Division One Midlands; SFL Division One Midlands; NPL Division One South
2007–08	Atherstone Town	Atherstone Town; Loughborough Dynamo	SFL Division One Midlands; NPL Division One South
2008–09	Market Drayton Town	Market Drayton Town	NPL Division One South
2009–10	Barwell	Barwell	NPL Division One South
2010–11	Coalville Town	Coalville Town	NPL Division One South
2011–12	Gresley	Gresley	NPL Division One South
2012–13	Stratford Town	Stratford Town	SFL Division One South & West
2013–14	Tividale	Tividale	NPL Division One South

The winners of the Alliance's two cup competitions were as follows:

Season	League Cup	Joe McGorian Cup
1994–95	Sandwell Borough	Not contested
1995–96	Blakenall	Not contested
1996–97	Willenhall Town	Shepshed Dynamo
1997–98	Knypersley Victoria	Willenhall Town
1998–99	Oldbury United	Knypersley Victoria
1999–2000	Willenhall Town	Oldbury United
2000–01	Stourbridge	Oadby Town
2001–02	Rushall Olympic	Stourbridge
2002–03	Stratford Town	Stourbridge
2003–04	Stratford Town	Stratford Town
2004–05	Racing Club Warwick	Not contested
2005–06	Barwell	Racing Club Warwick
2006–07	Leamington	Chasetown
2007–08	Shifnal Town	Leamington
2008–09	Market Drayton Town	Atherstone Town
2009–10	Coventry Sphinx	Barwell
2010–11	Stratford Town	Barwell
2011–12	Loughborough University	Stratford Town
2012–13	Loughborough University	Gresley
2013–14	Quorn	Loughborough University

== Member clubs ==
A total of 65 clubs played in the Midland Football Alliance:

Club	Years	No
AFC Wulfrunians	2013–2014	1
Alvechurch	2003–2014	11
Armitage	1995–1996	1
Atherstone Town	2006–2008; 2011–2012	3
Barwell	1994–2010	16
Biddulph Victoria	1994–2011	17
Blakenall	1995–1997	2
Bloxwich Town	1996–1998; 1999–2001	4
Boldmere St. Michaels	1994–2014	20
Bolehall Swifts	1994–1996	2
Bridgnorth Town	1996–2005; 2008–2013	14
Brierley Hill Town	1994–1995	1
Bromsgrove Rovers	2001–2002	1
Causeway United	2002–2014	12
Chasetown	1994–2006	12
Coalville Town	2003–2011	8
Coleshill Town	2008–2014	6
Continental Star	2012–2014	2
Coventry Sphinx	2007–2014	7
Cradley Town	1999–2010	11
Dunkirk	2010–2014	4
Ellesmere Rangers	2010–2013	3
Friar Lane & Epworth	2006–2011	5

Club	Years	No
Gornal Athletic	2012–2014	2
Gresley	2011–2012	1
Grosvenor Park	2002–2004	2
Halesowen Harriers	1994–2003	9
Heath Hayes	2010–2014	4
Heather St Johns	2011–2014	3
Highgate United	2008–2014	6
Hinckley Athletic	1994–1997	3
Kings Norton Town	1997–2000	3
Kirby Muxloe	2009–2014	5
Leamington	2005–2007	2
Loughborough Dynamo	2004–2008	4
Loughborough University	2009–2014	5
Ludlow Town	2001–2005	4
Malvern Town	2004–2006; 2009–2011	4
Market Drayton Town	2006–2009	3
Oadby Town	1999–2011	12
Oldbury United	1994–2009	15
Paget Rangers	1994–1995; 2001–2002	2
Pelsall Villa	1996–2004	8
Pershore Town	1994–2000	6
Quorn	2001–2007; 2013–2014	7
Racing Club Warwick	2003–2009	6

Club	Years	No
Rocester	1994–1999; 2003–2004; 2005–2014	15
Romulus	2004–2007	3
Rushall Olympic	1994–2005	11
Sandwell Borough	1994–2001	7
Shepshed Dynamo	1994–1996; 2013–2014	3
Shifnal Town	1994–2003; 2007–2010	12
Stafford Town	2000–2004	4
Stapenhill	1994–2002; 2007–2008	9
Stratford Town	1994–2013	19
Stourbridge	2000–2006	6
Stourport Swifts	1998–2001; 2012–2014	5
Studley	2001–2013	12
Tipton Town	2005–2014	9
Tividale	2011–2014	3
Walsall Wood	2013–2014	1
Wednesfield	1997–2003	6
West Midlands Police	1994–2001	7
Westfields	2003–2014	1
Willenhall	1994–2004; 2010–2012	12
