= Mile Oak Rovers & Youth F.C. =

Coordinates: 52°37′1.6″N 1°43′36.26″W

Mile Oak Rovers & Youth
- Full name: Mile Oak Rovers & Youth Football Club
- Nickname: The Oak
- Founded: 1958 (as Mile Oak Rovers)
- Dissolved: 2010
- Ground: Price Avenue Ground; Price Avenue; Mile Oak; Tamworth
- Capacity: tbc
- League: Midland Football Combination; Division One
- 2008–09: Midland Football Combination; Division One, 13th
Home colours	Away colours

Mile Oak Rovers & Youth F.C. was a football club based in South Tamworth, Staffordshire, England. The club was established in 1958 and folded in 2010.

== History ==
The club was formed in 1958 and run from the Mile Oak hotel. The club played at various grounds until 1967, when it moved to Price Avenue. Mile Oak Rovers played in various leagues and reached the Southern Football League in 1985–86. This proved to be a disastrous move and the club decided to return to the Midland Football Combination in 1989–90.

In 1993–94 they dropped to the Birmingham AFA due to severe financial pressures upon both the club and the team. The club returned to the Midland Football Combination for the 1998–99 season. The club did well but a lack of backroom staff forced the Rovers to fold at the end of the 2001–02 season. The club restarted in the 2003–04 season in the Midland Football Combination but folded again in 2010.
