= Blakenall F.C. =

Blakenall
- Full name: Blakenall Football Club
- Dissolved: 2001 (merger)
- Ground: The Red Lion Ground
- 2001–02: Southern League Division One West, 14/22

Blakenall F.C. was an English football club based in Blakenall Heath, West Midlands. They played at The Red Lion Ground.

== History ==
The club joined the Worcestershire Combination (later the Midland Combination in 1960 and won the Walsall Senior Cup in 1964. They were champions of the league in 1976–77, and two years later transferred to the Premier Division of the West Midlands (Regional) League. They were Premier Division champions in 1988–89, and after finishing second in 1994–95, were promoted to the Midland Alliance. They finished as runners-up in their first season in the league, and won it in their second, earning promotion to Division One Midlands of the Southern League. In 1999–2000 they won the Staffordshire Senior Cup.

At the end of the 2000–01 season the club merged with Bloxwich Town of the Midland Alliance to form Bloxwich United, taking Blakenall's place in the Southern League. However, after 19 games of the 2001–02 season, the Blakenall faction pulled out of the merger and resigned the club's place in the Southern League, leading to their record being expunged. Bloxwich Town were reformed, but Blakenall were not.

== Honours ==
- Midland Alliance
  - Champions 1996–97
- Midland Combination
  - Division One champions 1976–77
- West Midlands (Regional) League
  - Premier Division champions 1988–89
- Staffordshire Senior Cup
  - Winners 1999–2000
- Walsall Senior Cup
  - Winners 1963–64, 1974–75, 1975–76, 1976–77, 1980–81, 1988–89, 1995–96, 1997–98, 1998–99
