= Knowle F.C. =

Association football club in England

Coordinates: 52°23′34″N 1°44′01″W

Knowle
- Full name: Knowle Football Club
- Nickname: The Robins
- Founded: 1926
- Ground: Robins' Nest, Knowle
- Chairman: Stuart Lanyon
- Manager: Clive Seeley & Matt Seeley
- League: United Counties League Premier Division South
- 2025–26: Midland League Division One, 1st of 21 (promoted)
Home colours	Away colours

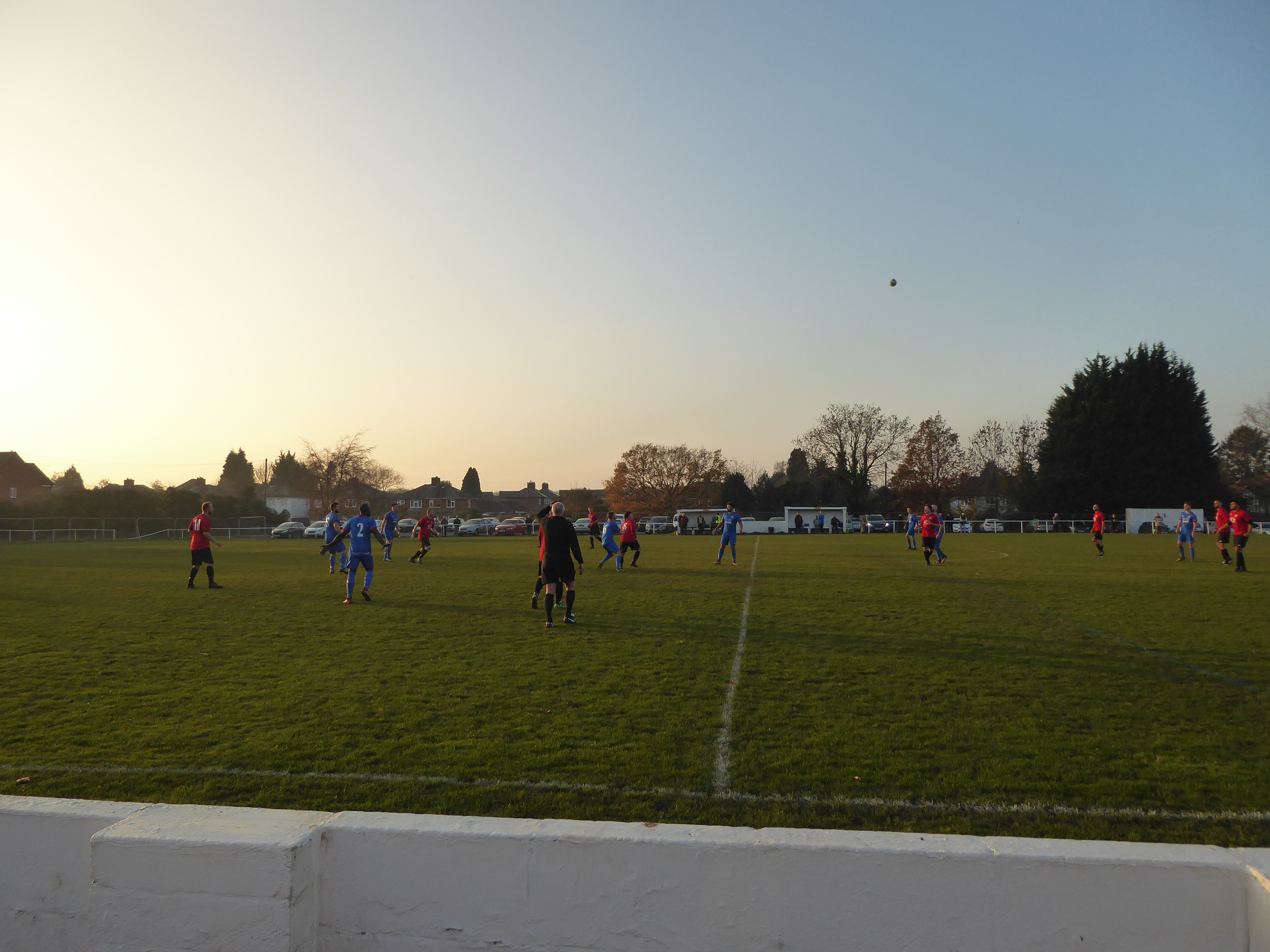
Knowle play Fairfield Villa at Hampton Road in November 2018

Knowle Football Club is a football club based in Knowle Solihull, in the West Midlands, England. They are currently members of the United Counties League Premier Division South and play at the Robins' Nest.

== History ==
The club was established in 1926 as Knowle Men's Institute. They played in the Birmingham Youth & Old Boys League, winning the league and league cup double in 1946–47. In 1966 the club, now known as Knowle Football Club, joined Division Two of the Worcestershire Combination, which was renamed the Midland Combination in 1968. Although they finished as Division Two runners-up in 1968–69, they were not promoted. However, following a fifth-place finish the following season, the club moved up to Division One.

In 1982–83 Knowle finished bottom of Division One, but avoided being relegated to Division Two. The club adopted the name Knowle North Star prior to the start of the 1983–84 season, which saw them finish bottom of the renamed Premier Division again. They also finished bottom of the division the following season. In 1985 the club reverted to their previous name. In 1996–97 they won the league's Challenge Cup, beating Kings Heath 5–4 on penalties after the final had ended 3–3. The club remained in the Premier Division until the end of the 1997–98 season, when they were demoted to Division One due to a lack of floodlights.

The 1998–99 season saw Knowle finish as runners-up in Division One and win the Birmingham Saturday Vase, beating Alveston Town 5–2 in the final. They went on to win the division in 2002–03 and 2005–06, but were unable to take promotion due to the lack of floodlights at their ground. In 2007–08 the club won the league's Presidents Cup and the Division One title, and were promoted to the Premier Division after agreeing a groundshare with Studley. However, they were demoted again at the end of the 2009–10 season despite finishing eleventh in the Premier Division, returning to their home ground in Knowle.

Knowle were Division One runners-up in 2010–11, also winning the Birmingham Saturday Vase with a 2–1 win over Shirley Town in the final. They won the Challenge Cup again in 2013–14. At the end of the season the Midland Combination merged with the Midland Alliance to form the Midland League, with Knowle placed in Division Two. In 2022–23 they won the Les James Challenge Cup, beating Hampton 3–1 in the final, and the Birmingham Saturday Vase with a 1–0 win over Sutton United. The club retained the cup the following season, beating Fairfield Villa 3–1 in the final.

In 2024–25 Knowle were runners-up in Division Two of the Midland League, earning promotion to Division One. The following season saw them win the Division One title, securing promotion to the Premier Division South of the United Counties League. They also won the Birmingham Midweek Floodlit Cup, beating Smethwick Rangers 3–0 in the final, and the Coventry Evening Telegraph Cup, defeating Coventry Colliery 6–0 in the final.

== Ground ==
The club play at the Robin's Nest ground on Hampton Road. A clubhouse was built on one side of the pitch shortly after World War II. An overhang from the building's roof provided cover to two rows of seating and a small covered standing area was provided on the same side of the pitch. However these were destroyed in 2017 during Storm Doris, leaving the club with no clubhouse or covered seating. In October 2018 a temporary modular unit building was installed on site to serve as a clubhouse, against which covered standing was created in July 2026. A permanent new 50-seat stand was opened in 2020. Floodlights were installed in October 2026 and the first floodlit game at the ground was held on 4 November 2025 against Chelmsley Town.

== Honours ==
- Midland League
  - Division One champions 2025–26
  - Les James Challenge Cup winners 2022–23, 2023–24
- Midland Combination
  - Division One champions 2002–03, 2005–06, 2007–08
  - Presidents Cup winners 2007–08, 2013–14
  - Challenge Cup winners 1996–97
- Birmingham Youth & Old Boys League
  - Champions 1946–47
  - League Cup winners 1946–47
- Birmingham Midweek Floodlit Cup
  - Winners 2025–26
- Birmingham Saturday Vase
  - Winners 1998–99, 2010–11, 2022–23
- Coventry Evening Telegraph Cup
  - Winners 2025–26

== Records ==
- Best FA Cup performance: First qualifying round, 2026–27
- Best FA Vase performance: Fifth round, 1981–82
- Record attendance: 931 vs Worcester City, FA Cup first qualifying round, 5 September 2026

== See also ==
- Knowle F.C. players
- Knowle F.C. managers
