= Sandwell Borough F.C. =

English football club

- Full name: Sandwell Borough Football Club
- Founded: 1918
- Dissolved: 2001
- Ground: Newbury Lane
Smethwick Highfield colours	Sandwell Borough colours

Sandwell Borough F.C. was an English association football club.

== History ==
The club was founded in 1918 as Smethwick Highfield F.C., and in 1985 changed its name Ashtree Highfield F.C.. The club competed in the Midland Football Combination between 1948 and 1988.

In 1987–88, the club won promotion to the Southern League and in 1989 it changed its name to Sandwell Borough. In 1990, the club was relegated to the Combination, where it stayed until 1994, when it joined the Midland Football Alliance. The club remained in the Alliance until folding in 2001.

The club also regularly entered the FA Cup, but never made it beyond the qualifying rounds.

== Colours ==
The club originally played in white shirts and black shorts; it adopted green and white stripes in 1985, on its name change to Ashtree Highfield.

== Ground ==
The team originally played at the Londonderry Playing Fields in Smethwick. In 1980 it moved to the Oldbury Sports Centre in Newbury Lane, which had the floodlights required for the Midland Combination top flight.

== Former players ==
1. Players that have played/managed in the Football League or any foreign equivalent to this level (i.e. fully professional league). 2. Players with full international caps. 3. Players that hold a club record or have captained the club.

- (England) Roland James
- Teddy Sandford, who left the club in 1929 for West Bromwich Albion, and who later played for England
