= Paget Rangers F.C. =

Association football club in England

Coordinates: 52°33′24.15″N 1°49′07.17″W

Paget Rangers
- Full name: Paget Rangers Football Club
- Nicknames: The Bears, The Wee Gers
- Short name: Paget
- Founded: 1938; 2011 (reformed)
- Ground: The Castle Vale Stadium, Farnborough Road, Birmingham B35 7QL
- Capacity: 1,500
- Chairman: Sean Feeney
- Manager: Sean feeney
- League: Midland League Division Two
- 2025–26: Midland League Division Two, 10th of 15
- Website: http://www.pagetrangers.co.uk
Home colours	Away colours	Third colours

Paget Rangers F.C. is an English football club based in Sutton Coldfield, Birmingham, currently playing in the Midland League Division Two.

== History ==
The club was established in 1938 by pupils of Paget Road School in Erdington, Birmingham and was accepted into the Intermediate Division of the Birmingham Juvenile Organisation Committee. In their first two seasons Paget were successful, winning the league title on both occasions, however the outbreak of World War II brought a halt to progress. At the end of the war, Paget joined the Birmingham Youth and Old Boys AFA, before moving to the Central Amateur League in 1949 and then the Worcestershire Combination (now Midland Combination) in 1950.

In 1951 Paget Rangers purchased a site on Springfield Road in Walmley for a cost of £550. Springfield Road was to be Paget's home for the next 42 years. The 1950s was a decade of consolidation for The Bears, before experiencing their first major success in 1960 when a unique quadruple was achieved: Paget won the Midland Combination League Title, the Midland Combination League Cup, the Birmingham Junior Cup and the Sutton Coldfield Charity Cup. Paget went on to retain the league title again in 1961. Further success followed in 1967 when Paget Rangers defeated Alvechurch to win the Midland Combination League cup (Alvechurch had beaten Paget in the previous year's final). In 1970 Paget won the Midland Combination Premier Division for the third time, following that success with a fourth title in 1971.

In 1971 the club erected floodlights at Springfield Road, becoming the first Midland Combination club to have floodlights. The switching on of the lights was marked by a visit of Aston Villa to Springfield Road.

Paget Rangers won their fourth Midland Combination League Cup in 1983 and a fifth success followed in 1986, earning Paget Rangers a place in the Southern League for the first time. Several players resigned followed the departure of manager Eddie Caulfield to local rivals Sutton Coldfield Town, and after one season in the Southern League the club was relegated to the West Midlands (Regional) League.

Paget adapted to the West Midlands (Regional) League and achieved a top half finish in all but one season between 1988 and 1994. The highest place achieved during this period was a second-place finish in 1992, when Gresley Rovers won the title. Success was achieved in the League Cup in 1992, when Paget Rangers defeated Gresley Rovers in a thrilling final. The club also reached the final of the League Cup in both 1993 and 1994, but finished as runners-up on both occasions.

In 1993 Paget Rangers sold their Springfield Road ground for housing development for a fee in excess of £1.4 million. Whilst a site for a new home was sought, Paget Rangers began a groundshare agreement with Sutton Coldfield Town.

In 1994, following league restructuring, Paget were elected as founder members of the new Midland Football Alliance. Paget won the inaugural championship in 1994–95 by a twelve-point margin from Hinckley Athletic to again achieve promotion to the Southern League Midland Division.

In the 1994–95 season, in addition to claiming the Midland Football Alliance Championship, Paget won the Lord Mayor of Birmingham's Charity Cup when beating Moor Green in the final, and finished as runners-up in the Staffordshire Senior Cup to Stoke City. The same season saw them reach the semi-final of the Birmingham Senior Cup, with their best-ever run in the competition which included a 2–1 victory over Coventry City in the quarter-final. However, they were beaten by Aston Villa at Villa Park.

In all, throughout the 1994–95 season, a total of five Southern League Clubs were beaten in various cup competitions. The first season in the Southern League resulted in a fifth-place finish, including victories over both Tamworth and Nuneaton Borough. Rangers were at the top of the league at Christmas 1994, after which striker Ian Bennett and midfielder David Campbell were sold to Leicester United.

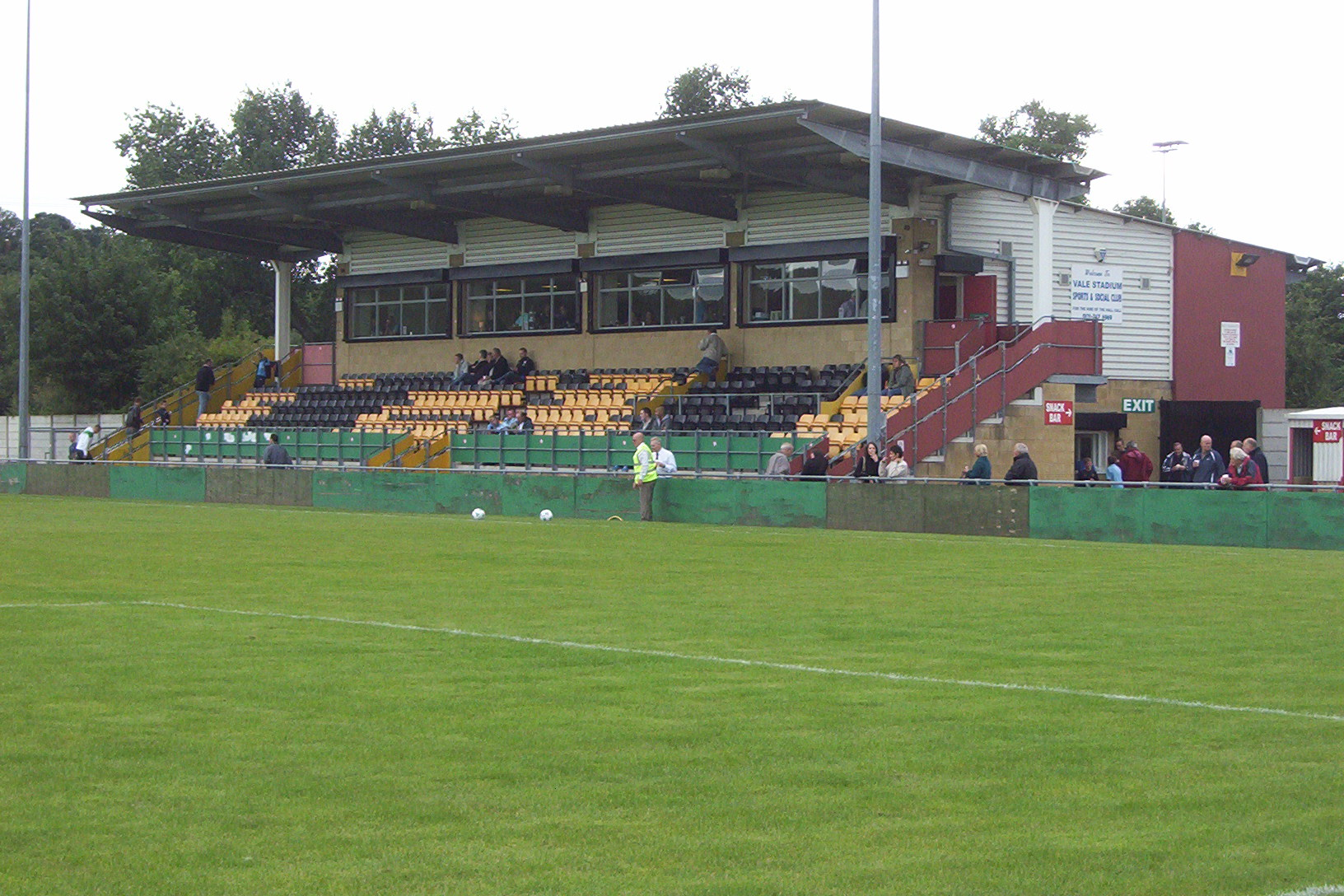
The stadium in Castle Vale where the original club played in its latter days

After five seasons ground sharing with Sutton Coldfield Town, Paget moved to their new home at Vale Stadium at Castle Vale, for the start of the 1998/99 season. An expected increase in attendances didn't materialise, the new pitch was prone to flooding and boardroom disagreements due to the inheritance of £1.4m caused the team to struggle both on and off the pitch.

The club continued to play in the Southern League Western Division for two more seasons before relegation occurred at the end of the 2000–01 season. As the season was drawing to a close, several players departed following the withdrawal of financial support, after which several youth team players were played. Paget were relegated to the Midland Alliance, but four wins from their final six games meant Paget avoided bottom spot.

Paget's first season back in the Midland Football Alliance saw youth featured prominently as the Bears attempted to stabilise in new surroundings. Paget achieved a mid-table position in their first season back in the Midland Alliance, however the club resigned at the end of the season and subsequently folded. The club's final game was at home to Barwell on 23 April 2002. Paget won the game 3–1.

In 2011 Paget Rangers supporter Matthew Dainty relaunched the club. After 18 months of planning Paget's application to the Midland Football Combination for the 2012–13 season was rejected, after which the club joined the Birmingham AFA where they were placed in Division 2. Paget won the Birmingham & District AFA Senior Cup at the first attempt, defeating Athletic Sparkhill in a final 6–5. In total three Premier Division clubs were defeated in the competition. Paget also came top of their league, pipping second-place Aston Reserves by a few points, to secure the AFA Division 2 title in their first season back.

For the 2013–14 season, Paget's application to the Midland Combination was successful and the club was placed in Division 3. Despite establishing a twelve-point lead by Christmas, the Bears were eventually caught and overtaken by eventual champions Kenilworth Town and runners-up Coventry United. 3rd place however, was sufficient to see the club promoted to the Midland Football League 2nd Division for the 2014–15 season. Paget also reached the final of the Smedley Crooke Memorial Cup in 2013–14, going down by 4 goals 1 against Bromsgrove Sporting at their Victoria Road ground in front of a crowd of 408.

After consolidating during the 2014–15 season, Paget enjoyed a more successful season in 2015–16, securing a 4th-place finish in the Midland Football League Second Division, which included a 15-game unbeaten run in the latter part of the season

In the 2016–17 season Paget enjoyed a more successful season after gaining promotion as champions of Division 2. This was followed by winning the Les James Challenge Cup at the home of Walsall FC, against Redditch Borough.

After three seasons of consolidation in the Midlands Football League First Division, Matthew Dainty took the decision to step down as chairman.

And so it was that just prior to the Coronavirus pandemic in 2020, a consortium led by James Parker took over the club. Parker was already Chairman of Birmingham St Georges Junior Football Club, with teams from U8 – U18. In fact, following the takeover, all of those Junior Teams re-branded and so from the beginning of the 2020/21 season Paget Rangers had teams competing at every age group from u8 through to the First Team.

The 2020–21 season, like the season before, was heavily impacrdd by the Covid pandemic and brought to an early finish. But not before Paget had enjoyed some success in the FA Vase, with victories over Wolverhampton Casuals and Chelmsley Town, before being eliminated by Radford.

In May 2021 and in anticipation of the 2021–22 season Paget announced the appointment of Steve Walker, who had spent the previous 8 years working at Step 3, as their new First Team Manager.

== Ground ==
Paget Rangers were originally based at the Gas Ground in Erdington, just off Paget Road and close to Paget School. In 1950 the club purchased the Springfield Road ground in Walmley which was to be Paget's home until the mid-1990s. Following the sale of the Springfield Road ground, Paget entered into a groundshare agreement with Sutton Coldfield Town for five seasons prior to moving to their new Castle Vale stadium in 1998. When the club was reformed in 2011, Paget entered into an agreement to play home games back at "The Gas Ground", Hollyfields Sports and Social, just off Paget Road in Erdington where the original club was formed. For the 2013–14 season Paget Rangers agreed a ground share with Boldmere St Michaels. For the 2018/19 season Paget have moved to groundshare at Sutton Coldfield Town's Coles Lane ground.

== Honours ==
The club has the following honours:

- Midland Football Combination
  - Champions 1959–60, 1960–61, 1969–70, 1970–71
- Midland Football League
  - Division 2 Champions 2016–17
- Midland Football Alliance
  - Champions 1994–95
- West Midlands (Regional) League
  - Runners-up 1991–92
- B.Y.C. Intermediate League
  - Champions 1938–39, 1940–41
- Midland Youth Floodlit League
  - Champions 1999–2000
- Birmingham & District AFA Division 2
  - Champions 2012–13

=== Cups ===
- Birmingham AFA Senior Cup
  - Winners 2013
- West Midland League Cup
  - Winners 1992
  - Runners-up 1993, 1994
- Les James Challenge Cup
  - Winners 1960, 1967, 1971, 1983, 1986, 2017
- Birmingham Senior Cup
  - Semi-finalist 1994
- Birmingham Junior Cup
  - Winners 1960, 1970
- Lord Mayor of Birmingham Charity Cup
  - Winners 1995
- Walsall Senior Cup
  - Winners 1986
- Staffordshire Senior Cup
  - Finalist 1995
  - Semi-finalist 1994
- Tony Alden Memorial cup
  - Winners 1971, 1973, 1984, 1987
- Sutton Coldfield Charity Cup
  - Winners 1958, 1960, 1966, 1968, 1999, 2002
- Smedley Crooke Memorial Cup
  - Finalist 2014

== Club records ==
- Record Attendance since reformation: 311 (vs Hinckley AFC 13 November 2016)
- Best league performance: 5th in Southern League Midland Division, 1995–96
- Best FA Cup performance: 3rd qualifying round, 1994–95
- Best FA Trophy performance: 2nd round, 1998–99
- Best FA Vase performance: 4th round, 1988–89

== Managerial statistics ==
Name	Nationality	From	To	P	W	D	L	GF	GA	Win%	Honours
Anthony Edmead	(England)	21 April 2012	15 July 2014	72	49	8	15	249	106	68.06	Birmingham AFA 2nd Division Champions 2012/13, Birmingham AFA Senior Cup Winners 2012/13, Midland Combination Division 2 Promotion 2013/14
Martin Asante	(England)	15 July 2014	14 October 2014	14	3	4	7	25	22	21.43	
Jason Lanns	(England)	15 October 2014	10 June 2019	208	105	25	78	456	363	50.48	Midland League 2nd Division Champions 2016/17, Les James Challenge Cup Winners 2016/17
Matthew Seeley	(England)	14 June 2019	25 February 2020	33	7	5	21	46	85	21.21	
James Parker	(England)	14 March 2020	Present	1	0	0	1	0	4	0.00	

== Kit ==
Date	Manufacturer	Shirt Sponsor
2012–14	Macron	Newlands Shopping Centre
2014–15	Adidas	HydraForce
2015–16	Umbro	Maxwell & Sons
2016–18	Errea	Phoenix Lawns
2018–20	Macron	

== Rivalries ==
Paget's main rivals are Sutton Coldfield Town, Boldmere St. Michaels and Sutton United with whom the club has risen through the divisions in recent seasons.

== Season history ==
Season	League Contested	Level	Pld	W	D	L	GF	GA	GD	Pts	League Position	Avg. Home Attendance	FA Cup	FA Trophy	FA Vase	League Cup	County Cup
1994–95	Midland Alliance	8	38	24	9	5	65	32	+32	81	1st of 20 (P)	105	3rd Q	n/a	1st round	3rd round	SF
1995–96	Southern League Division 1 Midlands	7	42	21	9	12	70	45	+25	72	5th of 22	176	2nd Q	1st Q	n/a	2nd round	SF
1996–97	Southern League Division 1 Midlands	7	40	13	9	18	42	55	−13	48	14th of 21	138	Prelim	1st Q	n/a	2nd round	1st round
1997–98	Southern League Division 1 Midlands	7	40	9	12	19	40	75	−35	39	18th of 21	140	Prelim	1st Q	n/a	1st round	4th round
1998–99	Southern League Division 1 Midlands	7	42	11	12	19	49	58	−9	45	19th of 22	162	1st Q	2nd round	n/a	1st round	QF
1999–00	Southern League Division 1 West	7	42	11	4	27	44	82	−38	37	19th of 22	172	Prelim	1st round	n/a	1st round	1st round
2000–01	Southern League Division 1 West	7	42	9	4	29	38	93	−55	31	21st of 22 (R)	136	1st Q	1st round	n/a	1st round	1st round
2001–02	Midland Alliance	8	42	10	19	13	58	55	+3	49	15th of 22	85	Prelim	n/a	1st round	1st round	2nd round
2012–13	Birmingham AFA 2nd Division	15	22	18	2	2	80	22	+58	56	1st of 12 (P)	29	n/a	n/a	n/a	Won	2nd round
2013–14	Midland Football Combination 2nd Division	12	30	20	6	4	98	33	+65	66	3rd of 16 (P)	39	n/a	n/a	n/a	1st round	2nd round
2014–15	Midland Football League 2nd Division	11	30	12	6	12	52	38	+14	42	11th of 16	66	n/a	n/a	n/a	4th round	3rd round
2015–16	Midland Football League 2nd Division	11	26	16	4	6	64	33	+31	52	4th of 14	53	n/a	n/a	1st Q	SF	2nd round
2016–17	Midland Football League 2nd Division	11	30	20	4	6	93	40	+53	64	1st of 16 (P)	78	n/a	n/a	2nd round	Won	3rd round
2017–18	Midland Football League 1st Division	10	42	16	7	19	80	85	−5	55	12th of 22	92	n/a	n/a	2nd Q	2nd round	QF
2018–19	Midland Football League 1st Division	10	36	14	7	15	61	66	−5	49	10th of 19	76	n/a	n/a	1st round	1st round	2nd round
