= West Midlands Police F.C. =

Coordinates: 52°27′08.49″N 1°54′25.24″W

West Midlands Police
- Full name: West Midlands Police Football Club
- Founded: 1928
- Ground: Tally Ho! Police Sports and Social Ground; Birmingham
- Chairman: Tony Campbell
- Manager: Johnny Norgrove
- League: Combined Midland Police League

West Midlands Police F.C. is a football club based in Birmingham, England.

== History ==
They were established in 1928 and were formed out of Birmingham City Police. They first entered the FA Vase in 1975 and the FA Cup in the 1990–91 season. They won the Midland Combination Premier Division in the 1990–91 season and reached the quarter-finals of the FA Vase the following season. They were league runners-up in 1993–94, and transferred to the Midland Football Alliance, in which they played for seven seasons before returning to the Combination. As a result of a decline in membership and a lack of funding, the West Midlands Police folded the club in 2014.

The side competed in the Police Athletic Association Cup against other forces. Moreover, in previous years, the Police have played against the Queen's Royal Hussars for the Hydrabad Cup. West Midlands Police are the current holders of the cup and games take place on remembrance Sunday each year.

The team in the past had many players who have represented the British Police side – notably Mark Bellingham, Ben Smith and Ollie Latchford.

The team is now run by Johnny Norgrove (manager) and Tony Campbell (club secretary). The police side is now solely for Police officers and others from inside the Police family. The team compete in two national competitions which are The Emergency Services Football League and the Police Sport UK Cup. They also play in the newly formed regional competition the Combined Midland Police League.

The team has grown in size and now also supports two veterans teams that also compete in the veteran edition of the ESFL and PSUK competitions.

The 2021/22 season saw great progress across the club where the sides were involved in 4 semi finals and won the ESFL national 5 aside tournament. The Veterans side lost a narrow semi final to holders and eventual winners Glasgow Strathclyde in their first ever attempt in the competition. The force team reached the semi final of the inaugural ESFL European Championships in a narrow 3 - 2 loss to Mersyside Fire & Rescue. They again reached the semi-final of the CMPL shield and lost to eventual winners Leicestershire Police on penalties. West Mids B team also lost on penalties of the CMPL Daniel Rigley plate semi final losing 4–5 on penalties to Northants Police.

Striker Kyle King finished top scorer for the 1st team.

Mark Bellingham finished top scorer for the veterans netting 16 goals, Center half Rich Faulkner won Players player award, Captain Rory McFarlane won Managers player and Danny Hitchmough won the play-maker award.

The club currently play in Red and Black striped tops for home matches and Blue and Black striped tops for away matches. The alternative kit is all orange.

== Ground ==
The team play home matches at Tally Ho! Police Sports and Social Ground, Pershore Rd, Edgbaston, Birmingham.

== Honours ==
- Midland Combination Premier Division
  - Champions 1990–91
  - Runners-up 1993–94

ESFL National 5aside

Champions 2021

== Records ==
- FA Cup
  - Second Qualifying Round 1993–94, 1998–99
- FA Vase
  - Quarter-finals 1991–92
