= Boldmere St. Michaels F.C. =

Association football club in England

Coordinates: 52°32′30.300″N 1°50′32.690″W

Boldmere St. Michaels
- Full name: Boldmere St. Michaels Football Club
- Nickname: The Mikes
- Founded: 1883
- Ground: Boldmere Community Stadium, Boldmere
- Capacity: 2,500 (230 seated)
- Chairman: Ralph Simmons
- Manager: Ben Roberts
- League: Northern Premier League Division One Midlands
- 2025–26: Northern Premier League Division One Midlands, 14th of 22
Home colours	Away colours

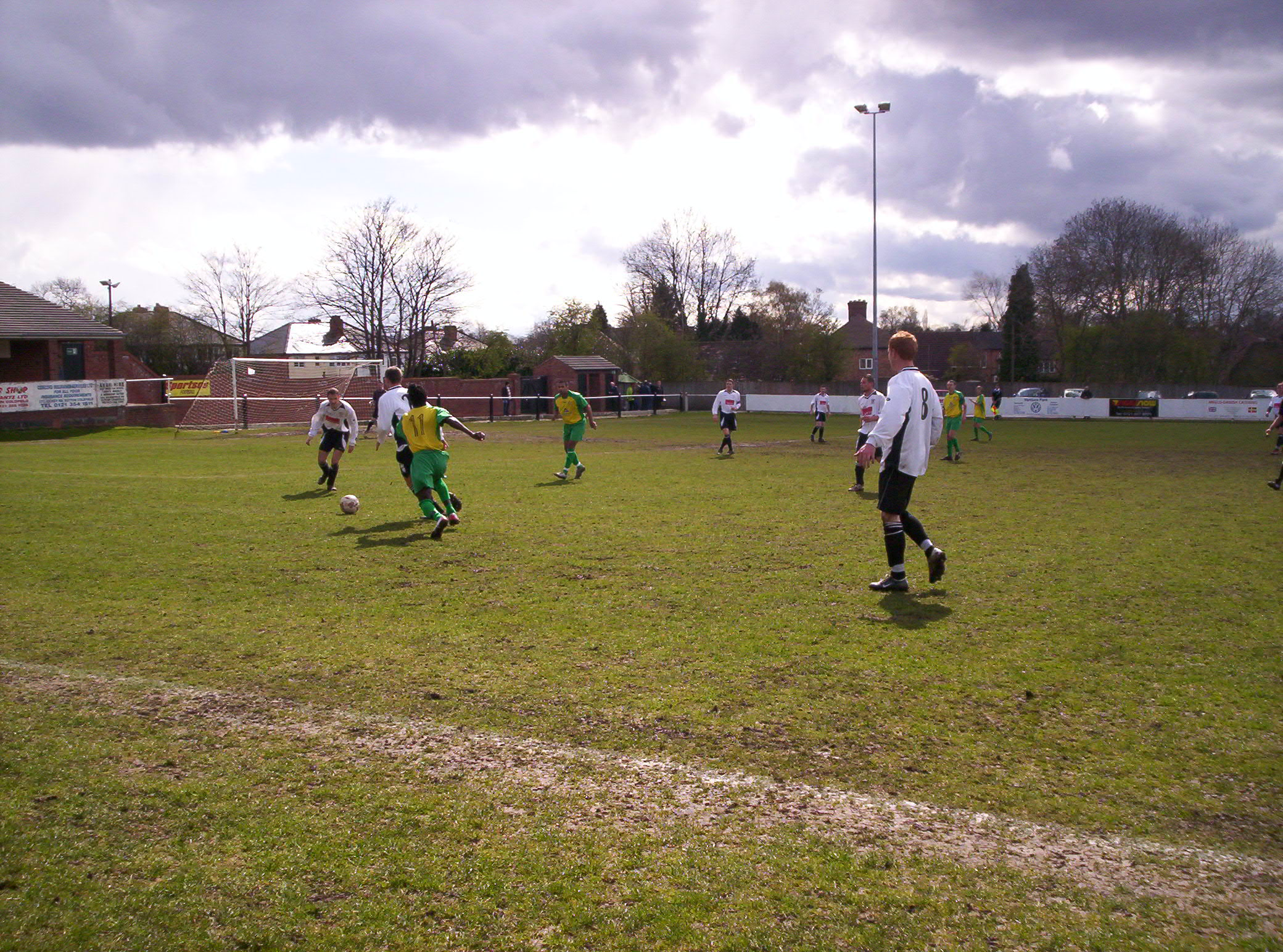
Boldmere (white shirts) in action in 2008 vs Barwell

Boldmere St. Michaels Football Club is a football club based in Boldmere, Sutton Coldfield, England. They are currently members of the Northern Premier League Division One Midlands and play at the Boldmere Community Stadium.

== History ==
The club was established in 1883 as a youth football team attached to the local church. After playing friendly matches against other church teams for the next 29 years, they joined a league for the first time in 1912. The club subsequently progressed through several leagues before joining the Birmingham AFA League. They won the league's Senior Cup in 1928–29 and the Junior Cup in 1933–34. In 1937 the club joined the Central Amateur League, and were league runners-up in 1938–39, before winning the league in 1946–47.

In 1947–48 Boldmere reached the semi-finals of the FA Amateur Cup, eventually losing 2–0 to Barnet in front of 26,000 spectators at Highbury. They were also Central Amateur League runners-up and reached the final of the AFA Senior Cup, drawing the final with Cambridge Town 2–2, with the clubs jointly awarded the trophy. They subsequently hosted the Indian Olympic team in a friendly match following the 1948 Summer Olympics, losing by a single goal. The following season saw Boldmere win the Central Amateur League, after which they joined the Birmingham & District League. Deciding to remain amateur in a largely semi-professional league, the club's performances began to decline and they finished second-from-bottom of the league in 1952–53 and 1953–54.

When the Birmingham & District League merged with the Birmingham Combination in 1954, Boldmere were placed in the South Division for a transitional season, in which they finished bottom of the table. As a result, the club became members of Division Two the following season. The league was subsequently reduced to a single division in 1960 and renamed the West Midlands (Regional) League in 1962. In 1963 the club dropped into Division One of the Worcestershire Combination. The league was renamed the Midland Combination in 1968 and the club were Challenge Cup winners in 1977–78 before winning the league's Tony Allden Cup in 1978–79. Division One became the Premier Division in 1983 and the club were league champions in 1985–86, and after finishing as runners-up in 1987–88, they won a second league title in 1988–89. The 1989–90 saw them win the treble of the league, the League Cup and the Tony Allden Cup. They went on to retain both cups the following season, and won the Tony Allden Cup again in 1991–92.

In 1994 Boldmere were founder members of the Midland Alliance, and were league runners-up in 2013–14, the league's final season. When it merged with the Midland Combination to form the Midland League, the club became members of the Premier Division. They were runners-up in the Premier Division in 2021–22, earning promotion to Division One Midlands of the Northern Premier League.

== Ground ==
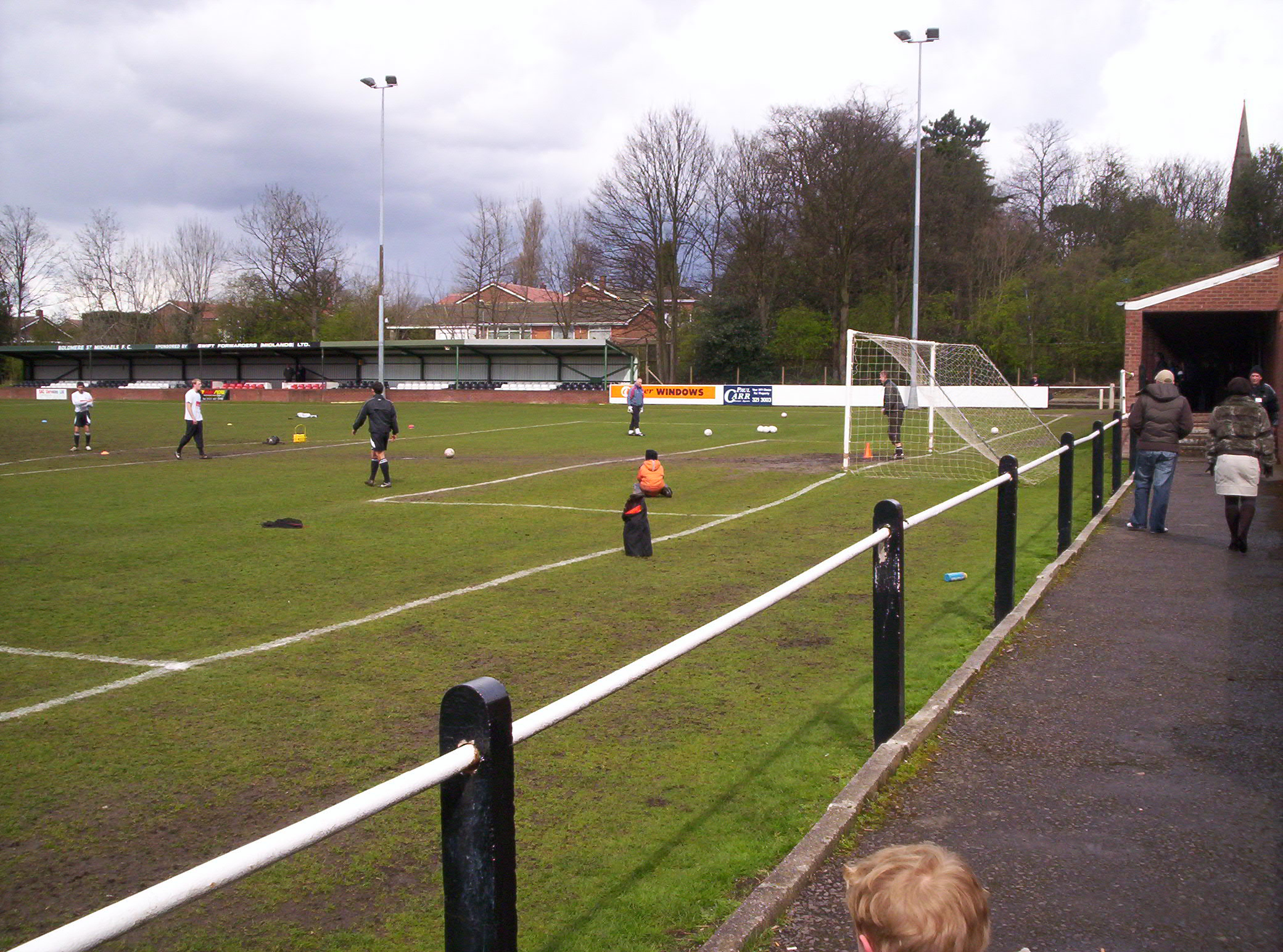
The Trevor Brown Memorial Ground

Originally named Church Road, the ground was renamed in 2004 after former chairman Trevor Brown. It was renamed again in 2023 to the Boldmere Community Stadium. The ground currently has a capacity of 2,500, of which 230 is seated and 400 covered.

== Honours ==
- Midland Combination
  - Champions 1985–86, 1988–89, 1989–90
  - Challenge Cup winners 1977–78, 1989–90, 1990–91
  - Tony Allden Cup winners 1978–79, 1989–90, 1990–91, 1991–92
- Birmingham AFA
  - Senior Cup winners 1928–29
  - Junior Cup winners 1933–34, 1958–59, 1965–66
- Central Amateur League
  - Champions 1946–47, 1948–49
- AFA Senior Cup
  - Winners 1947–48 (joint)
- Walsall Senior Cup
  - Winners 1986–87, 2005–06, 2006–07, 2007–08, 2018–19
- Birmingham Junior Cup
  - Winners 1971–72
- Sutton Charity Cup
  - Winners 1968–69, 1970–71, 1996–97, 1997–98
- Fazeley Charity Cup
  - Winners 1997–98

== Records ==
- Best FA Cup performance: Second qualifying round, 1987–88, 1997–98, 2026–27
- Best FA Trophy performance: Third qualifying round, 2023–24
- Best FA Vase performance: Third round, 1974–75, 1977–78, 1988–89, 1989–90, 1995–96, 1996–97, 2009–10
- Best FA Amateur Cup performance: Semi-finals, 1947–48

== See also ==
- Boldmere St. Michaels F.C. players
- Boldmere St. Michaels Women F.C.
