= 2026–27 Midland Football League =

Midland Football League
- Season: 2026–27

The 2026–27 Midland Football League season (named The Capelli Sport MFL for sponsorship reasons) is the thirteenth in the history of the Midland Football League, a regional football competition in England with member clubs based predominantly in the West Midlands and north up to Cheshire and east into Leicestershire. The League operates four hierarchical men's divisions and an Under 21 team division. The men's divisions are part of the National League System: the Premier Division is at Step 5, Division One at Step 6, and Division Two and Division Three at county feeder league level.

The allocations for Steps 3 to 6 for this season were announced by The Football Association on 14 May 2026.

== Premier Division ==
This division comprises 20 teams, two more than the previous season.

The following 6 clubs left the division before the season:

- 1874 Northwich, promoted to the Northern Premier League
- Coton Green, transferred to the United Counties League
- Hanley Town, promoted to the Northern Premier League
- Highgate United, transferred to the United Counties League
- Stourport Swifts, transferred to the Hellenic League
- Studley, relegated to the Hellenic League

The following 8 clubs joined the division:

- Cheadle Town, transferred from the North West Counties League
- Darlaston Town 1874, relegated from the Northern Premier League
- Runcorn Town, promoted from the North West Counties League
- Sporting Khalsa, relegated from the Northern Premier League
- Stockport Georgians, promoted from the North West Counties League
- Sutton United, promoted from Division One
- West Didsbury & Chorlton, transferred from the North West Counties League
- Wythenshawe Town, relegated from the Northern Premier League

=== League table ===
Pos	Team	Pld	W	D	L	GF	GA	GD	Pts	Promotion, qualification or relegation
1	Northwich Victoria	16	13	2	1	47	9	+38	41	Promotion to the Northern Premier League
2	Abbey Hulton United	19	13	2	4	39	27	+12	41	Qualification for the promotion play-offs
3	Brocton	20	12	2	6	50	30	+20	38	Qualification for the promotion play-offs
4	Runcorn Town	19	11	4	4	47	19	+28	37	Qualification for the promotion play-offs
5	Sutton United	18	11	4	3	45	24	+21	37	Qualification for the promotion play-offs
6	Winsford United	20	12	1	7	32	21	+11	37	
7	Cheadle Town	18	10	4	4	29	19	+10	34	
8	AFC Wolverhampton City	19	8	3	8	37	37	0	27	
9	Dudley Town	19	7	5	7	43	42	+1	26	
10	Sporting Khalsa	18	6	6	6	33	30	+3	24	
11	Whitchurch Alport	18	6	6	6	28	31	−3	24	
12	West Didsbury & Chorlton	19	6	6	7	33	39	−6	24	
13	Romulus	18	5	8	5	25	22	+3	23	
14	Wythenshawe Town	20	6	4	10	26	33	−7	22	
15	Stockport Georgians	19	6	3	10	25	41	−16	21	
16	Lye Town	17	5	1	11	32	41	−9	16	
17	Darlaston Town 1874	19	3	6	10	22	38	−16	15	
18	Stone Old Alleynians	19	3	5	11	23	49	−26	14	
19	Uttoxeter Town	18	3	3	12	19	36	−17	12	Relegation to Division One
20	Tividale	19	2	1	16	22	69	−47	7	Relegation to Division One

Updated to match(es) played on 21 November 2026. Source: The FA Full-time: Midland Football League: 2026–27 Premier Division
Rules for classification: 1) points; 2) goal difference; 3) number of goals scored; 4) number of matches won; 5) head-to-head results

=== Results table ===
Home \ Away	ABB	WOL	BRO	CHE	DAR	DUD	LYE	NOV	ROM	RUN	SPO	STG	SOA	SUT	TIV	UTT	WES	WHI	WIN	WYT
Abbey Hulton United			0–1			2–1					2–4	3–2			3–1		1–0		2–0	2–1
AFC Wolverhampton City	0–4		0–2				5–6		1–1	2–3	2–2			2–4		6–1		0–2	0–1	
Brocton	2–0			1–2	4–0		2–4	0–2			6–4				5–1		2–2		1–0	
Cheadle Town		2–1					3–2			1–3			2–0				2–2		0–1	3–0
Darlaston Town 1874	0–2		2–2				2–3		2–0	1–1	0–0		0–2	3–3		1–1	0–4			
Dudley Town	1–2	3–4	3–2		0–0		2–1		2–2				5–4		3–4	0–2		4–0		
Lye Town		0–1	0–5	0–2		3–4						2–2					1–2			4–1
Northwich Victoria	5–3			3–1		6–0			0–0			6–0	6–0			1–0	2–1		3–0	2–0
Romulus	1–2		2–4	1–0			3–1				0–2	4–0	4–1			1–1				
Runcorn Town		2–3		0–1			4–2		0–0				4–1	3–1	5–0	2–0		1–2		1–1
Sporting Khalsa	2–2	1–2		2–2	1–0			2–3	2–2					1–2	4–0					
Stockport Georgians					1–0	3–5				0–3	0–1					2–1	3–1	1–1	0–2	3–2
Stone Old Alleynians		2–2	1–6	1–1			0–2	0–4	2–1		1–2			0–0			1–2	1–3		
Sutton United			2–1		6–1		1–0	2–0		1–1		4–0			3–4	4–0		3–3		3–1
Tividale	1–1	0–3		0–3	1–5	0–5						1–4	4–5						1–4	0–3
Uttoxeter Town	2–3				3–4	0–0			0–1					1–2	4–1			1–3		
West Didsbury & Chorlton		1–2				3–3				0–7	2–2	3–1	1–1		3–2			4–3	0–3	
Whitchurch Alport			0–2	1–2				0–0	1–1	1–4		1–1			3–0	2–0	1–1			
Winsford United	2–3		5–1			2–0		0–4		0–2	3–1	0–2	0–0			3–0	2–1			1–0
Wythenshawe Town		0–1		1–1	3–1	2–2			1–1	2–1	1–0			2–1		0–2		5–1	0–3	

Updated to match(es) played on 17 November 2026. Source: The FA Full-time: Midland Football League: 2026–27 Premier Division: Fixtures Grid
Legend: Blue = home team win; Yellow = draw; Red = away team win.

=== Stadia and locations ===
2026–27 Premier Division: location of clubs (NW England & West Midlands)
2026–27 Premier Division: location of clubs (Cheshire with Greater Manchester)
2026–27 Premier Division: location of clubs (Staffordshire with West Midlands)

Club	Location	Stadium	Capacity
Abbey Hulton United	Abbey Hulton	Birches Head Road	
AFC Wolverhampton City	Wolverhampton	Castlecroft Stadium	2,000
Brocton	Brocton	Silkmore Lane	1,500
Cheadle Town	Cheadle	Park Road Stadium	
Darlaston Town 1874	Walsall	The Paycare Ground	1,000
Dudley Town	Willenhall	Asprey Arena (groundshare with Sporting Khalsa)	5,000
Lye Town	Lye	Lye Sports Ground	1,000
Northwich Victoria	Runcorn	APEC Taxis Stadium	
Romulus	Sutton Coldfield	Domino's Arena (groundshare with Sutton Coldfield Town)	
Runcorn Town	Runcorn	Viridor Community Stadium	
Sporting Khalsa	Willenhall	Aspray Arena	5,000
Stockport Georgians	Stockport (Woodsmoor)	Cromley Road	
Stone Old Alleynians	Meir Heath	King's Park	
Sutton United	Sutton Coldfield	Coleshill Road	
Tividale	Tividale	The Beeches	2,000
Uttoxeter Town	Uttoxeter	Oldfields	
West Didsbury & Chorlton	Manchester (Chorlton-cum-Hardy)	Brookburn Road	
Whitchurch Alport	Whitchurch	Yockings Park	
Winsford United	Winsford	Barton Stadium	3,000
Wythenshawe Town	Wythenshawe	Ericstan Stadium	1,320

== Division One ==
This division comprises 22 teams, the same amount as the previous season.

The following 7 clubs left the division before the season:

- AFC Bridgnorth, transferred to the North West Counties League
- Bilston Town, transferred to the North West Counties League
- Knowle, promoted to the United Counties League
- Nuneaton Griff, relegated to Division Two
- Sutton United, promoted to the Premier Division
- Wednesfield, transferred to the North West Counties League

Allexton & New Parks resigned partway through last season.

The following 7 clubs joined the division:

- Anstey Town, promoted from the Leicestershire Senior League
- Bustleholme, promoted from the West Midlands (Regional) League
- Coalville Town, transferred from the United Counties League
- FCV Grace Dieu, transferred from the United Counties League
- GNG Oadby Town, relegated from the United Counties League
- Holwell Sports, transferred from the United Counties League
- Northfield Town, promoted from Division Two

Additionally, Smethwick Rangers were renamed to Boldmere Rangers

=== League table ===
Pos	Team	Pld	W	D	L	GF	GA	GD	Pts	Promotion, qualification or relegation
1	Gornal Athletic	20	17	2	1	70	15	+55	53	Promotion to the Premier Division
2	Northfield Town	21	17	1	3	56	17	+39	52	Qualification for the promotion play-offs
3	Coalville Town	22	15	3	4	63	30	+33	48	Qualification for the promotion play-offs
4	Heather St John's	23	14	4	5	47	28	+19	46	Qualification for the promotion play-offs
5	Leicester St Andrews	21	14	2	5	48	22	+26	41 (Note: On 21 August 2026, Leicester St Andrews were deducted 3 points for fielding an ineligible player)	Qualification for the promotion play-offs
6	Ingles	21	11	4	6	40	27	+13	37	
7	Lutterworth Athletic	22	11	3	8	46	35	+11	36	
8	GNG Oadby Town	23	11	3	9	46	39	+7	36	
9	Birstall United	21	11	0	10	29	36	−7	33	
10	Birmingham OJM	19	9	2	8	33	31	+2	29	
11	FCV Grace Dieu	22	7	6	9	35	26	+9	27	
12	Coventry Copsewood	22	7	6	9	44	45	−1	27	
13	Bustleholme	22	7	6	9	50	52	−2	27	
14	AFC North Kilworth	21	7	4	10	20	36	−16	25	
15	Boldmere Rangers	21	7	3	11	30	43	−13	24	
16	Anstey Town	22	6	5	11	28	43	−15	23	
17	Saffron Dynamo	22	6	4	12	32	50	−18	22	
18	Stapenhill	22	5	5	12	20	41	−21	20	
19	Chelmsley Town	23	6	2	15	30	55	−25	20	
20	Kirby Muxloe	22	5	3	14	26	57	−31	18	Relegation to a feeder league
21	Cradley Town	19	5	2	12	25	55	−30	17	Relegation to a feeder league
22	Holwell Sports	21	2	2	17	18	53	−35	8	Relegation to a feeder league

Updated to match(es) played on 21 November 2026. Source: The FA Full-time: Midland Football League: 2026–27 Division One
Rules for classification: 1) points; 2) goal difference; 3) number of goals scored; 4) number of matches won; 5) head-to-head results

=== Results table ===
Home \ Away	NKW	ANS	BIR	BOL	BUS	CHE	COA	CVC	CRA	GRA	GNG	GOR	HSJ	HOL	ING	KIR	LSA	LUT	NOT	OJM	SAF	STA
AFC North Kilworth		0–4	1–0				1–3	2–1				0–3		1–0	1–1	0–0			1–3		1–1	
Anstey Town	1–1			2–0		3–1	0–1	1–5		1–1									0–4	0–5	1–0	1–1
Birstall United	0–2	2–0			2–1						4–2		2–1		2–0	1–0				2–0	2–1	0–1
Boldmere Rangers	2–0					2–0	1–2	2–5	1–2		1–2			2–0			0–4		1–0	1–1		
Bustleholme		4–3				4–4		7–2	1–1	3–2		0–4	2–2	1–3			2–4				1–0	2–2
Chelmsley Town	2–3		1–3	2–2			2–0				1–5	1–5	2–3	1–0					0–3	3–2		
Coalville Town	2–0		4–2		3–0			4–3	8–0		3–1		1–1	3–0			1–1		4–2			4–1
Coventry Copsewood				2–2					1–1			0–6				4–0		1–2	0–3	4–3	2–2	0–0
Cradley Town	3–0	1–5			0–2	2–1	3–6			0–4					1–3	2–3		0–4	1–3			4–2
FCV Grace Dieu		2–0	3–1	5–0		2–0		0–0					0–0		1–4	3–3	1–2	0–2		1–2		
GNG Oadby Town	2–0	3–1	5–0			4–1		1–1		0–0			0–2	4–0	0–2	1–2		1–3		1–4		
Gornal Athletic				7–1		4–0	2–0			2–1			0–0	6–0		5–2	1–2	1–1		4–3	6–2	
Heather St John's	4–2		3–1	1–2				1–0			3–2			1–0				4–2	2–0		4–1	
Holwell Sports		0–1			1–1		1–4	0–2	1–3	2–1	2–2	0–4				2–3	2–4		1–2			
Ingles		4–0	1–3		3–2	2–1				1–1			2–4				1–2	3–1		3–1	1–1	0–2
Kirby Muxloe	1–2			0–4	1–7	1–2	0–6	0–4			0–2		3–0		1–1		1–2					4–0
Leicester St Andrews	0–1	2–0	5–0		3–0		1–1		4–0				2–1						0–2		1–3	6–0
Lutterworth Athletic		2–2	3–0	2–0		3–2	6–2			0–2		2–4			2–1		1–2		1–1	1–2	5–0	2–1
Northfield Town			2–0		5–2	1–0		4–2			6–1					4–0	3–1	3–0				
Birmingham OJM					3–2					1–0		0–4	0–2			2–0					2–0	0–0
Saffron Dynamo				3–2	3–3	1–2		2–5	1–0	1–5	2–3		3–2	3–0	1–2							
Stapenhill		2–2		2–1							0–1	0–1	0–1	4–3	0–3				0–4	2–0	0–1	

Updated to match(es) played on 14/11/2026. Source: The FA Full-time: Midland Football League: 2026–27 Division One: Fixtures Grid
Legend: Blue = home team win; Yellow = draw; Red = away team win.
For upcoming matches, an "a" indicates there is an article about the rivalry between the two participants.

=== Stadia and locations ===
2026–27 Division One: location of clubs (England Midlands)

2026–27 Division One: location of clubs (West Midlands)
2026–27 Division One: location of clubs (Leicestershire)

Club	Location	Stadium	Capacity
AFC North Kilworth	North Kilworth	North Kilworth Sports and Football Club	
Anstey Town	Leicester	Beaumont Park	
Birstall United	Birstall	Meadow Lane	
Boldmere Rangers	Boldmere	Trevor Brown Memorial Ground	2,500
Bustleholme	Birmingham (Sandwell)	Ray Hall Lane	
Chelmsley Town	Coleshill	Pack Meadow	
Coalville Town	Coalville	The Mander Cruickshank Stadium	
Coventry Copsewood	Coventry	Allard Way	2,000
Cradley Town	Cradley	Beeches View	
FCV Grace Dieu	Thringstone	FCV Academy, Grace Dieu Manor Park	
GNG Oadby Town	Leicester	Riverside	3,000
Gornal Athletic	Lower Gornal	Garden Walk Stadium	1,500
Heather St John's	Heather	St John's Park	2,050
Holwell Sports	Asfordby Hill	Welby Road	1,000
Ingles	Thringstone	Homestead Road	2,050
Kirby Muxloe	Kirby Muxloe	Ratby Lane	3,000
Leicester St Andrews	Aylestone	Canal Street	1,000
Lutterworth Athletic	Lutterworth	Hall Park	
Northfield Town	Birmingham (Northfield)	Shenley Lane	
Birmingham OJM	Birmingham (Kings Norton)	Triplex Sports Ground	
Saffron Dynamo	Cosby	Kings Park	
Stapenhill	Stapenhill	Edge Hill	1,500

== Division Two ==
This division comprises 16 teams, the same amount as the previous season.

The following 2 clubs left the division before the season:

- Lane Head, relegated to Division Three
- Northfield Town - promoted to Division One

Boldmere Sports & Social Falcons resigned partway through last season

The following 3 clubs joined the division:

- Coventry Colliery, promoted from Division Three
- Kenilworth Sporting, promoted from Division Three
- Nuneaton Griff - relegated from Division One

=== League table ===
Pos	Team	Pld	W	D	L	GF	GA	GD	Pts
1	Birmingham United	16	12	3	1	43	9	+34	39
2	Cadbury Athletic	17	11	4	2	49	20	+29	37
3	Kenilworth Sporting	17	10	2	5	45	27	+18	32
4	Earlswood Town	13	8	4	1	23	14	+9	28
5	Hampton	18	8	3	7	28	19	+9	27
6	Coventry Alvis	17	8	1	8	30	30	0	25
7	Wake Green Amateur	16	7	2	7	22	20	+2	23
8	AFC Solihull	15	6	4	5	28	18	+10	22
9	Paget Rangers	18	8	1	9	32	37	−5	22 (Note: On 26 August 2026 Paget Rangers were deducted 3 points for fielding an ineligible player)
10	Nuneaton Griff	15	7	0	8	27	30	−3	21
11	Central Ajax	16	6	3	7	27	30	−3	21
12	Bolehall Swifts	18	6	2	10	31	45	−14	20
13	Coventry Colliery	13	5	3	5	26	24	+2	18
14	Fairfield Villa	15	3	3	9	19	34	−15	12
15	Inkberrow	17	2	4	11	16	43	−27	10
16	Coventrians	17	2	1	14	15	61	−46	7

Updated to match(es) played on 21 November 2026. Source: The FA Full-time: Midland Football League: 2026–27 Division Two
Rules for classification: 1) points; 2) goal difference; 3) number of goals scored; 4) number of matches won; 5) head-to-head results

=== Results table ===
Home \ Away	ALV	BOL	BUN	CAD	CAJ	CVN	CVC	EAR	FFV	HAM	INK	KEN	NUN	PAG	SOL	WGA
Coventry Alvis		5–1		2–5				0–3			1–0	2–4	3–0	3–0	2–1	
Bolehall Swifts			2–6	1–1				1–2		0–1	3–1	3–1		2–3		3–1
Birmingham United	5–0					2–0					6–0	0–0				3–0
Cadbury Athletic			2–0				3–2		7–0	1–0	5–0			1–2		1–1
Central Ajax	2–1	1–4	0–3	1–4					2–2	0–3			4–1	3–1		2–1
Coventrians	1–2	0–2	0–4	3–7	1–5		0–5			0–5	1–1	1–6	0–6			
Coventry Colliery				0–3	3–1				1–0	0–2			0–4	4–0	2–2	
Earlswood Town	1–1			1–1	1–3		2–2				3–2		2–0	2–1	1–1	
Fairfield Villa	0–1	2–2	0–1	2–5		1–0				2–2	4–2	1–4		3–0		
Hampton	3–0	3–1	1–1					1–2						1–3	1–0	
Inkberrow	0–5		1–2		1–1	0–3				2–2						2–1
Kenilworth Sporting		3–4		1–1			3–4	1–2	2–1	2–1	2–1		3–1	4–0	3–2	1–2
Nuneaton Griff	3–2	3–1	1–2			2–0				1–0		1–5			2–1	
Paget Rangers		5–1	1–2			5–0			2–0		0–0		3–2			
AFC Solihull		2–0	1–1		2–1	4–0			3–1	1–2				4–0		
Wake Green Amateur				4–1	0–0		2–1	0–1		2–0	3–1		4–0	0–2	0–2	

Updated to match(es) played on 14 November 2026. Source: The FA Full-time: Midland Football League: 2026–27 Division Two: Fixtures Grid
Legend: Blue = home team win; Yellow = draw; Red = away team win.

=== Stadia and locations ===
2026–27 Division Two: location of clubs (West Midlands)

2026–27 Division Two: location of clubs (West Midlands)
2026–27 Division Two: location of clubs (Warwickshire)

Club	Location	Stadium
AFC Solihull	Earlswood	Rumbush Lane
Birmingham United	Birmingham	Castle Vale (Groundshare with Romulus)
Bolehall Swifts	Bolehall	Rene Road
Cadbury Athletic	Birmingham	Moseley Rugby Club
Central Ajax	Budbrooke	Ajax Park
Coventrians	Keresley End	Colliery Sports Ground
Coventry Alvis	Coventry	Alvis Sports & Social Club
Coventry Colliery	Allesley	Hawkesmill Sports Club
Earlswood Town	Earlswood	The Pavilions
Fairfield Villa	Fairfield	Stourbridge Road
Hampton	Solihull	Field Lane
Inkberrow	Inkberrow	Sands Road (Groundshare with Sporting Club Inkberrow)
Kenilworth Sporting	Kenilworth	Gypsy Lane
Nuneaton Griff	Nuneaton	Pingles Stadium
Paget Rangers	Birmingham	Castle Vale (Groundshare with Romulus)
Wake Green Amateur	Shirley	The Holloway

== Division Three ==
This division comprises 16 teams, the same as the previous season.

The following 2 clubs left the division before the season:

- Coventry Colliery, promoted to Division Two
- Kenilworth Sporting, promoted to Division Two

Castle Vale Town resigned partway through last season.

The following 3 clubs joined the division:

- Lane Head, relegated from Division Two
- Leafield Athletic, transferred from West Midlands (Regional) League
- Mercia Athletic, relegated from the Coventry Alliance League

=== League table ===
Pos	Team	Pld	W	D	L	GF	GA	GD	Pts
1	BNJS	15	13	1	1	42	13	+29	40
2	Solihull Youth Academy	15	11	1	3	66	18	+48	34
3	Silhill	15	10	1	4	39	15	+24	31
4	Walsall Wood	17	10	0	7	36	32	+4	30
5	Leamington Hibernian	17	9	0	8	38	40	−2	27
6	Gornal	12	8	2	2	33	11	+22	26
7	Coventry Dunlop	14	9	1	4	56	18	+38	25 (Note: On 3 September 2026 Coventry Dunlop were deducted 3 points for fielding an ineligible player)
8	Lane Head	15	7	3	5	38	28	+10	24
9	AFC Birmingham	13	6	5	2	29	16	+13	23
10	AFC Balsall	12	7	3	2	42	7	+35	21 (Note: On 24 August 2026 AFC Balsall were deducted 3 points for fielding an ineligible player)
11	Leafield Athletic	15	6	2	7	27	31	−4	20
12	Diamonds Academy	15	3	5	7	28	37	−9	14
13	Continental Star	17	1	4	12	17	65	−48	7
14	Birmingham Tigers	16	2	1	13	27	79	−52	7
15	Mercia Athletic	16	1	3	12	17	51	−34	6
16	Arden Forest	16	0	2	14	9	83	−74	−1 (Note: On 6 October 2026 Arden Forest were deducted 3 points for failure to fulfil a fixture)

Updated to match(es) played on 21 November 2026. Source: The FA Full-time: Midland Football League: 2026–27 Division Three
Rules for classification: 1) points; 2) goal difference; 3) number of goals scored; 4) number of matches won; 5) head-to-head results

=== Results table ===
Home \ Away	AFC	AFS	BAL	BNJ	CON	CVD	DIA	GOR	LAN	LEF	HIB	MER	SIL	SYA	TIG	WLW
AFC Birmingham								1–1			4–1					
Arden Forest	0–5		0–7	0–2	2–2		1–1				1–5		0–7		3–5	1–2
AFC Balsall		6–0				1–2						3–0			10–0	
BNJS	0–0		2–1			3–0	6–4			2–1						2–1
Continental Star	1–1		1–4	0–10		1–5	2–2	0–3	2–5	0–2		4–1	1–4		2–2	
Coventry Dunlop		6–0					11–0		4–0	5–1	1–2	1–1	0–1			9–2
Diamonds Academy	3–3								1–1		0–2		1–1			
Gornal					8–0	0–3										4–0
Lane Head	2–3	7–0		3–2	3–0			2–2				1–1	1–2		6–2	3–0
Leafield Athletic	0–3	11–1	0–0	0–1			2–1	0–4				1–1			2–1	
Leamington Hibernian	3–1		0–7	0–2	3–0		3–1	1–3		0–3						1–3
Mercia Athletic	0–4			0–1			0–8	1–5	3–2		3–4					1–3
Silhill		7–0	0–1				0–1			2–0	2–3	3–0		2–0	5–0	3–1
Solihull Youth Academy	4–2		1–1	2–4		4–1	2–1	1–2	5–0	8–1	5–1		6–0		8–2	3–0
Birmingham Tigers				1–3		2–8	2–4	0–1			2–8	5–2		1–9		2–6
Walsall Wood	0–1	2–0			8–1		1–0					3–1			2–0	

Updated to match(es) played on 14 November 2026. Source: The FA Full-time: Midland Football League: 2026–27 Division Three: Fixtures Grid
Legend: Blue = home team win; Yellow = draw; Red = away team win.

=== Stadia and locations ===
2026–27 Division Three: location of clubs (England West Midlands)

2026–27 Division Three: location of clubs (West Midlands)
2026–27 Division Three: location of clubs (Warwickshire)

Club	Location	Stadium
AFC Balsall	Coventry	Massey Ferguson Sports Ground
AFC Birmingham	Halesowen	Illey Lane
Arden Forest	Fordbridge	Tudor Grange Academy Kingshurst
BNJS	Smethwick	Hadley Stadium
Birmingham Tigers	Smethwick	Hadley Stadium
Continental Star	Perry Barr	Holford Drive
Coventry Dunlop	Coventry	Dunlop Sports and Social Club
Diamonds Academy	Walsall	University of Wolverhampton Walsall Campus
Gornal	Wombourne	Wombourne Leisure Centre
Lane Head	Bloxwich	Somerfield Road
Leafield Athletic	Earlswood	Rumbush Lane
Leamington Hibernian	Solihull	Field Lane (Groundshare with Hampton)
Mercia Athletic	Coventry	The Place Westwood
Silhill	Solihull	Sharmans Cross Road
Solihull Youth Academy	Solihull	Tudor Grange Academy Solihull
Walsall Wood	Walsall	John Sylvester Stadium
