= 2024–25 Midland Football League =

Midland Football League
- Season: 2024–25
- Champions: Lichfield City
- Promoted: Lichfield City (automatic) Shifnal Town (play-offs)
- Relegated: Highgate United Wolverhampton Casuals
- Matches: 306
- Goals: 1,012 (3.31 per match)
- Top goalscorer: Ryan Lee Harkin (31 goals)

The 2024–25 Midland Football League season is the eleventh in the history of the Midland Football League, a football competition in England. The Midland League operates four divisions in the English football league system, the Premier Division at Step 5, Division One at Step 6, Division Two at Step 7 and Division Three at Step 8; these four divisions are covered by this article.

The allocations for Steps 3 to 6 for this season were announced by The Football Association on 17 May 2024.

== Premier Division ==
This division comprises 18 teams, the same amount as the previous season.

The following 3 clubs left the division before the season:

- Bewdley Town - relegated to the Hellenic League Division One
- Congleton Town - promoted to the Northern Premier League Division One West
- Darlaston Town (1874) - promoted to the Northern Premier League Division One Midlands

The following 3 clubs joined the division:

- 1874 Northwich - relegated from the Northern Premier League Division One West
- Brocton - promoted from the North West Counties League Division One South
- OJM CFC - promoted from Division One

=== Premier Division table ===
Pos	Team	Pld	W	D	L	GF	GA	GD	Pts	Promotion, qualification or relegation
1	Lichfield City (C, P)	34	26	4	4	88	36	+52	82	Promotion to the Northern Premier League
2	Shifnal Town (O, P)	34	25	3	6	74	27	+47	78	Qualification for the play-offs (Note: Four teams play for one spot and promotion to Step 4)
3	Atherstone Town	34	23	5	6	76	41	+35	74	Qualification for the play-offs, then transfer to the United Counties League Premier South
4	1874 Northwich	34	19	9	6	63	45	+18	66	Qualification for the play-offs
5	Brocton	34	19	4	11	85	46	+39	61	Qualification for the play-offs
6	Whitchurch Alport	34	18	4	12	71	43	+28	58	
7	Dudley Town	34	18	4	12	64	52	+12	58	
8	OJM CFC (R)	34	14	7	13	68	56	+12	49	Demotion to Division One (Note: OJM CFC were demoted to Division One after failing the Stadium Accreditation process.)
9	Stone Old Alleynians	34	13	6	15	42	48	−6	45	
10	Stourport Swifts	34	12	9	13	44	53	−9	45	
11	Northwich Victoria	34	10	12	12	47	58	−11	42	
12	Studley	34	13	3	18	40	60	−20	42	
13	Romulus	34	12	3	19	54	69	−15	39	
14	AFC Wulfrunians	34	11	6	17	45	60	−15	39	
15	Uttoxeter Town	34	6	9	19	44	67	−23	27	
16	Tividale	34	5	8	21	45	86	−41	23	
17	Highgate United	34	5	6	23	30	84	−54	21	Reprived from relegation (Note: Highgate United were reprived from relegation due to the demotion of OJM CFC.)
18	Wolverhampton Casuals (R)	34	4	4	26	24	73	−49	16	Relegation to North West Counties League Division One South

Source: The FA
Rules for classification: 1) points; 2) goal difference; 3) number of goals scored; 4) number of matches won; 5) head-to-head results
(C) Champions; (O) Play-off winners; (P) Promoted; (R) Relegated
Notes:

step

=== Results table ===
Home \ Away	18N	WUL	ATH	BRO	DUD	HIG	LIC	NOV	OJM	ROM	SHI	SOA	SPS	STU	TIV	UTT	WCA	WVC
1874 Northwich	—	1–0	1–1	0–4	2–5	0–0	2–1	0–0	2–0	2–3	0–0	2–1	2–0	0–2	3–2	2–2	1–0	3–0
AFC Wulfrunians	0–1	—	1–3	5–1	3–1	1–1	0–1	2–2	1–1	2–4	0–1	1–2	2–2	0–1	0–1	1–1	0–2	3–0
Atherstone Town	5–1	0–3	—	0–2	2–1	3–1	0–2	2–3	3–2	3–1	1–3	1–0	2–2	4–1	3–2	2–1	2–0	2–0
Brocton	0–1	6–0	1–2	—	5–0	4–1	2–2	1–1	3–1	1–3	1–2	3–1	3–1	5–0	8–3	1–2	4–2	7–0
Dudley Town	4–1	0–2	1–1	2–0	—	4–2	1–1	2–3	5–3	2–0	1–0	2–0	1–2	2–4	4–0	2–1	2–1	3–2
Highgate United	1–1	0–1	0–5	2–3	1–2	—	0–4	2–3	2–4	1–1	4–3	1–1	0–4	1–0	1–3	0–1	1–4	0–1
Lichfield City	2–2	6–1	4–1	0–4	1–0	8–0	—	3–0	5–2	2–1	4–2	0–1	2–1	2–1	2–0	4–2	3–2	1–0
Northwich Victoria	1–4	2–1	2–2	0–0	1–4	2–1	0–1	—	3–1	3–0	1–2	1–1	1–1	1–1	2–2	2–2	0–3	3–1
OJM CFC	0–2	0–1	0–3	0–0	0–1	3–0	2–6	4–0	—	3–1	1–2	1–1	4–0	2–1	3–2	3–2	3–0	1–0
Romulus	2–4	3–2	2–3	2–3	4–2	0–1	1–3	3–1	1–1	—	1–3	0–3	3–1	0–1	3–1	3–2	2–3	4–2
Shifnal Town	1–1	5–1	1–2	1–0	2–0	5–0	3–0	2–1	3–2	4–0	—	1–0	5–0	0–1	3–0	5–1	3–0	0–0
Stone Old Alleynians	1–2	1–2	0–6	2–0	3–0	1–0	0–3	3–1	0–3	0–1	0–2	—	5–0	4–0	2–1	1–1	0–3	2–0
Stourport Swifts	1–5	1–3	0–1	3–1	0–0	3–0	0–1	2–1	0–0	2–1	1–0	2–2	—	3–1	0–0	1–1	1–3	4–0
Studley	0–3	3–0	2–2	1–2	0–2	2–0	0–4	1–0	2–6	3–0	0–2	3–0	1–0	—	1–1	1–2	1–3	1–0
Tividale	1–3	2–3	0–1	2–4	2–5	1–1	3–3	1–1	0–5	1–0	0–2	0–2	0–2	4–3	—	1–1	0–6	5–1
Uttoxeter Town	2–4	3–0	0–4	0–2	2–3	2–3	1–2	1–2	3–3	3–2	1–2	0–0	0–1	2–0	1–1	—	0–2	0–1
Whitchurch Alport	2–4	2–2	0–2	2–1	1–0	3–0	0–3	0–0	1–1	1–1	1–2	4–0	1–2	3–0	4–2	4–0	—	5–0
Wolverhampton Casuals	1–1	0–1	1–2	2–3	0–0	1–2	1–2	2–3	0–3	0–1	1–2	1–2	1–1	0–1	3–1	2–1	0–3	—

Source: The FA
Legend: Blue = home team win; Yellow = draw; Red = away team win.
For upcoming matches, an "a" indicates there is an article about the rivalry between the two participants.

=== Play-offs ===
Semi-finals
2	Shifnal Town	3
5	Brocton	2
3	Atherstone Town	0
4	1874 Northwich	1

Final
2	Shifnal Town	2
4	1874 Northwich	0

==== Semifinals ====
19 April	Atherstone Town	0–1	1874 Northwich	Atherstone
15:00		Report	Woolley 90+7'	Stadium: Sheepy Road; Attendance: 528

19 April	Shifnal Town	3–2	Brocton	Shifnal
15:00	Fitzgerald 23' (pen.); Byrne 25'; Rowley 67'	Report	Weldon 13'; Smith 27'	Stadium: Acoustafoam Stadium; Attendance: 695

==== Final ====
26 April	Shifnal Town	2–0	1874 Northwich	Shifnal
15:00	Fitzgerald 15' (pen.); Bood 44'	Report		Stadium: Acoustafoam Stadium; Attendance: 1,067

=== Stadia and locations ===
Location of the clubs in the 2024–25 Midland League Premier Division
Location of the clubs in the 2024–25 Midland League Premier Division from Cheshire
Location of the clubs in the 2024–25 Midland League Premier Division
1 1874 Northwich
2 Northwich Victoria
3 Whitchurch Alport F.C.
4 Studley F.C.
5 Atherstone Town
6 A.F.C. Wulfrunians

Club	Location	Stadium	Capacity
1874 Northwich	Barnton	The Offside Trust Stadium	3,000
AFC Wulfrunians	Wolverhampton	Castlecroft Stadium	2,000
Atherstone Town	Atherstone	Sheepy Road	
Brocton	Brocton	Silkmore Lane	1,500
Dudley Town	Willenhall	Asprey Arena	
Highgate United	Shirley	The Coppice	2,000
Lichfield City	Lichfield	City Ground	1,000
Northwich Victoria	Northwich	Wincham Park	4,813
OJM CFC	Birmingham (Kings Norton)	Triplex Sports Ground	
Romulus	Birmingham (Castle Vale)	Castle Vale Stadium	2,000
Shifnal Town	Shifnal	Phoenix Park	
Stone Old Alleynians	Meir Heath	King's Park	
Stourport Swifts	Stourport-on-Severn	Walshes Meadow	2,000
Studley	Studley	The Beehive	
Tividale	Tividale	The Beeches	2,000
Uttoxeter Town	Uttoxeter	Oldfields	
Whitchurch Alport	Whitchurch	Yockings Park	
Wolverhampton Casuals	Featherstone	Brinsford Lane	

== Division One ==
This division comprises 22 teams, two more than the previous season.

The following 6 clubs left the division before the season:

- Allscott Heath - transferred to the North West Counties League Division One South
- Droitwich Spa - transferred to the Hellenic League Division One
- Hinckley - promoted to the United Counties League Premier Division South
- OJM CFC - promoted to the Premier Division
- Shawbury United - transferred to the North West Counties League Division One South
- Wolverhampton Sporting - transferred to the North West Counties League Division One South

The following 8 clubs joined the division:

- Allexton & New Parks - promoted from the Leicestershire Senior League Premier Division
- Birstall United - transferred from the United Counties League Division One
- Gornal Athletic - promoted from the West Midlands (Regional) League Division One
- Kirby Muxloe - transferred from the United Counties League Division One
- Leicester St Andrews - transferred from the United Counties League Division One
- Lutterworth Athletic - transferred from the United Counties League Division One
- Nuneaton Town - resigned from the Southern League Premier Division Central
- Saffron Dynamo - transferred from the United Counties League Division One

=== Division One table ===
Pos	Team	Pld	W	D	L	GF	GA	GD	Pts	Promotion, qualification or relegation
1	Nuneaton Town (C, P)	42	32	7	3	121	38	+83	103	Promotion to the United Counties League Premier Division South
2	Heather St John's	42	31	2	9	114	42	+72	95	Qualification for the play-offs (Note: Four teams play for one spot and promotion to Step 5)
3	Leicester St Andrews	42	26	9	7	104	61	+43	87	Qualification for the play-offs
4	Cradley Town	42	28	2	12	112	60	+52	86	Qualification for the play-offs
5	Coton Green (O, P)	42	25	7	10	100	55	+45	82	Qualification for the play-offs
6	Kirby Muxloe	42	23	5	14	95	76	+19	74	
7	Smethwick Rangers	42	21	9	12	73	51	+22	72	
8	Ingles	42	20	10	12	88	62	+26	70	
9	Bilston Town	42	20	9	13	94	73	+21	69	
10	Sutton United	42	20	5	17	80	70	+10	65	
11	Coventry Copsewood	42	18	7	17	80	76	+4	61	
12	Nuneaton Griff	42	16	11	15	72	74	−2	59	
13	Stapenhill	42	15	8	19	68	68	0	53	
14	Birstall United	42	15	7	20	87	90	−3	52	
15	Saffron Dynamo	42	14	9	19	66	73	−7	51	
16	Gornal Athletic	42	13	8	21	67	69	−2	47	
17	AFC Bridgnorth	42	12	11	19	52	77	−25	47	
18	Lutterworth Athletic	42	10	9	23	69	102	−33	39	
19	Chelmsley Town	42	9	8	25	63	104	−41	35	
20	Allexton & New Parks	42	7	9	26	47	121	−74	30	Reprived from relegation
21	Wednesfield	42	5	4	33	33	113	−80	19	Reprived from relegation
22	Paget Rangers (R)	42	2	4	36	38	168	−130	10	Relegation to Division Two

Source: The FA
Rules for classification: 1) points; 2) goal difference; 3) number of goals scored; 4) number of matches won; 5) head-to-head results
(C) Champions; (O) Play-off winners; (P) Promoted; (R) Relegated

=== Results table ===
Home \ Away	BRI	ANP	BIL	BIR	CHE	CTG	CVC	CRA	GOR	HSJ	ING	KMX	LSA	LUT	NUG	NUT	PAG	SFD	SMW	STA	SUT	WED
AFC Bridgnorth	—	0–2	3–4	5–3	0–0	0–1	3–1	1–2	1–4	1–3	1–1	4–2	0–1	2–1	0–1	0–2	2–1	1–2	2–1	2–1	0–4	0–0
Allexton & New Parks	0–0	—	2–2	1–6	3–4	2–1	1–2	1–6	0–1	0–2	2–1	1–4	1–7	3–0	1–1	2–4	3–2	1–4	2–2	0–0	0–3	2–2
Bilston Town	4–1	4–0	—	2–2	4–0	1–1	3–1	1–0	3–2	1–3	1–0	3–3	2–4	2–3	2–2	0–1	8–1	1–0	0–0	2–1	4–0	4–3
Birstall United	3–0	5–1	4–2	—	2–1	1–4	1–6	2–1	1–2	1–2	1–6	0–1	1–4	1–2	2–2	1–2	11–1	1–0	1–1	1–3	2–0	1–0
Chelmsley Town	0–2	2–1	1–2	5–4	—	0–3	4–0	1–3	2–0	0–2	4–3	2–1	4–7	4–2	1–3	0–2	3–1	1–1	2–4	1–1	0–4	0–2
Coton Green	3–3	2–1	6–1	4–0	1–0	—	3–0	2–0	3–1	0–2	2–4	2–3	5–1	2–1	2–1	0–2	6–0	2–1	5–0	0–2	3–2	4–1
Coventry Copsewood	2–2	1–3	3–2	5–3	6–0	2–1	—	1–3	1–0	2–3	0–2	1–1	0–2	1–3	3–3	0–5	6–0	2–0	0–2	4–3	2–1	4–3
Cradley Town	4–0	6–1	2–0	2–1	3–1	2–2	2–1	—	4–2	7–3	0–2	3–0	4–2	5–2	3–0	1–3	3–2	5–0	2–4	0–3	1–0	6–1
Gornal Athletic	0–0	3–1	1–2	1–1	5–2	2–3	0–2	1–2	—	0–4	2–2	0–3	1–3	3–3	7–2	2–2	2–3	0–1	0–1	0–1	0–1	2–1
Heather St John's	0–1	7–0	6–2	3–0	3–0	0–2	4–1	3–1	2–0	—	2–1	4–1	1–3	3–0	4–0	1–1	8–0	3–0	1–0	2–3	1–0	2–1
Ingles	5–1	2–0	1–1	2–1	1–1	5–3	1–1	0–4	0–0	2–0	—	3–5	0–0	3–0	3–0	2–0	3–0	2–1	2–4	2–1	0–0	0–1
Kirby Muxloe	2–0	2–0	1–2	2–3	2–1	1–4	4–1	0–1	2–1	2–1	3–3	—	1–0	2–2	2–4	1–3	4–1	0–2	3–0	4–1	3–2	4–1
Leicester St Andrews	3–1	5–2	1–1	3–3	4–3	3–2	1–1	1–3	2–4	2–1	3–3	5–1	—	1–0	2–1	0–4	5–0	1–1	2–0	2–0	2–0	5–0
Lutterworth Athletic	1–1	4–0	1–2	0–3	1–1	3–3	0–4	0–5	2–2	1–5	2–1	1–3	3–4	—	1–4	1–7	4–1	4–2	2–1	2–2	1–3	7–2
Nuneaton Griff	2–2	1–1	1–2	1–0	3–0	1–2	0–0	1–0	1–2	3–2	2–4	0–5	2–2	1–0	—	0–2	5–0	1–2	1–0	0–2	3–2	3–2
Nuneaton Town	5–0	7–0	2–1	2–0	1–1	4–2	3–2	4–1	2–0	0–2	3–2	5–2	0–0	1–0	1–1	—	6–1	3–0	3–2	3–0	6–2	4–1
Paget Rangers	0–3	1–1	1–5	3–5	1–1	2–2	0–2	1–8	0–5	0–5	3–5	1–7	0–1	2–2	2–3	2–6	—	0–2	0–3	1–6	1–3	0–1
Saffron Dynamo	2–1	2–1	4–3	2–2	4–4	0–2	0–3	2–2	0–4	1–1	1–2	0–1	0–3	3–3	1–1	1–0	6–0	—	1–3	4–2	5–0	5–0
Smethwick Rangers	1–1	5–0	2–1	3–1	2–1	0–0	1–1	1–2	0–0	0–4	3–0	0–2	1–3	2–0	2–2	1–1	3–0	2–0	—	1–0	1–0	3–1
Stapenhill	1–2	1–2	1–1	0–1	4–1	0–0	0–3	3–1	1–2	1–2	0–3	1–1	2–1	2–1	3–1	1–3	1–0	2–2	2–4	—	1–1	1–0
Sutton United	1–2	6–1	2–1	3–3	3–2	0–2	3–1	4–1	2–0	0–5	3–2	7–0	2–2	3–1	0–6	2–2	2–0	1–0	0–2	4–1	—	3–0
Wednesfield	1–1	1–1	0–5	0–2	3–2	0–3	0–1	0–1	0–3	1–2	0–2	0–4	0–1	0–2	0–2	0–4	1–3	2–1	0–5	1–7	0–1	—

Source: The FA
Legend: Blue = home team win; Yellow = draw; Red = away team win.
For upcoming matches, an "a" indicates there is an article about the rivalry between the two participants.

=== Play-offs ===
Semi-finals
2	Heather St John's	0
5	Coton Green	2
3	Leicester St Andrews	3
4	Cradley Town	2

Final
3	Leicester St Andrews	2 (3)
5	Coton Green	2 (5)

==== Semifinals ====
26 April	Heather St John's	0–2	Coton Green	Heather
15:00		Report	Henry 10'; Roome 22'	Stadium: St John's Park; Attendance: 349

26 April	Leicester St Andrews	3–2	Cradley Town	Aylestone
15:00	Crossley 40', 53'; Peace 80'	Report	Harvey 5'; Bishop 27'	Stadium: Canal Street; Attendance: 401

==== Final ====
3 May	Leicester St Andrews	2–2 (3–5 p)	Coton Green	Aylestone
		Report		Stadium: Canal Street; Attendance: 924

=== Stadia and locations ===
Location of the West Midlands clubs in the 2024–25 Midland League Division One
Location of the Leicestershire clubs in the 2024–25 Midland League Division One
Location of the Leicestershire clubs in the 2024–25 Midland League Division One

Club	Location	Stadium	Capacity
AFC Bridgnorth	Bridgnorth	Crown Meadow	
Allexton & New Parks	Leicester	New College Leicester	
Bilston Town	Bilston	Queen Street	4,000
Birstall United	Birstall	Meadow Lane	
Chelmsley Town	Coleshill	Pack Meadow	
Coton Green	Fazeley	New Mill Lane	
Coventry Copsewood	Coventry	Allard Way	2,000
Cradley Town	Cradley	Beeches View	
Gornal Athletic	Lower Gornal	Garden Walk Stadium	2,000
Heather St John's	Heather	St John's Park	2,050
Ingles	Thringstone	Homestead Road	2,050
Kirby Muxloe	Kirby Muxloe	Ratby Lane	3,000
Leicester St Andrews	Leicester	Canal Street	1,000
Lutterworth Athletic	Lutterworth	Hall Park	
Nuneaton Griff	Nuneaton	Pingles Stadium	4,000
Nuneaton Town	Nuneaton	The Oval	4,614
Paget Rangers	Sutton Coldfield	Central Ground	2,000
Saffron Dynamo	Cosby	Cambridge Road	
Smethwick Rangers	Boldmere	Trevor Brown Memorial Ground	2,500
Stapenhill	Stapenhill	Edge Hill	1,500
Sutton United	Sutton Coldfield	Coleshill Road	
Wednesfield	Wednesfield	Cottage Ground	

== Division Two ==
This division comprises 15 teams, one less than the previous season.

The following 3 clubs left the division before the season:

- Redditch Borough - promoted to the Hellenic Football League Division One
- Alcester Town - transferred to the Herefordshire Football League Premier Division
- AFC Coventry Rangers - folded

The following 2 clubs joined the division:

- AFC Solihull - promoted as champions of Division Three
- Northfield Town - promoted as runners-up of Division Three

=== Division Two table ===
Pos	Team	Pld	W	D	L	GF	GA	GD	Pts	Promotion, qualification or relegation
1	Northfield Town (C)	28	23	4	1	74	19	+55	73	
2	Knowle (P)	28	22	4	2	88	11	+77	70	Promotion to Division One
3	Birmingham United	28	17	6	5	78	46	+32	54 (Note: Birmingham United 3 points deducted.)	
4	Central Ajax	28	14	7	7	64	44	+20	49	
5	Hampton	28	12	10	6	69	46	+23	46	
6	AFC Solihull	28	12	5	11	54	47	+7	41	
7	Coventrians	28	11	7	10	57	48	+9	40	
8	Cadbury Athletic	28	12	4	12	54	54	0	40	
9	Bolehall Swifts	28	10	3	15	55	76	−21	33	
10	Littleton	28	10	1	17	53	75	−22	31	
11	Inkberrow	28	7	5	16	50	75	−25	26	
12	Coventry Alvis	28	7	4	17	48	82	−34	25	
13	Earlswood Town	28	7	4	17	50	85	−35	25	
14	Fairfield Villa	28	7	3	18	31	66	−35	24	
15	Lane Head	28	4	3	21	32	83	−51	15	Reprived from relegation

Updated to match(es) played on 21 April 2025. Source: The FA
Rules for classification: 1) points; 2) goal difference; 3) number of goals scored; 4) number of matches won; 5) head-to-head results
(C) Champions; (P) Promoted

== Division Three ==
This division comprises 15 teams, two less than the previous season.

The following 3 clubs left the division before the season:

- AFC Solihull - promoted as champions to Division Two
- Northfield Town - promoted as runners-up to Division Two
- DSC United - resigned from the league

The following clubs joined the division:

- Kenilworth Sporting - new club

=== Division Three table ===
Pos	Team	Pld	W	D	L	GF	GA	GD	Pts	Promotion, qualification or relegation
1	Boldmere Sports & Social Falcons (C, P)	27	25	1	1	156	31	+125	76	Promotion to Step 7
2	Wake Green Amateur	28	22	3	3	132	31	+101	69	Promotion to Step 7
3	Silhill	28	21	4	3	103	38	+65	67	
4	Kenilworth Sporting	28	17	2	9	81	42	+39	53	
5	AFC Birmingham	27	15	2	10	75	60	+15	47	
6	Continental Star	28	15	2	11	62	53	+9	47	
7	Balsall/Berkswell	28	14	1	13	58	68	−10	43	
8	Feckenham	28	11	8	9	61	56	+5	41	
9	Castle Vale Town	28	12	3	13	70	60	+10	39	
10	Solihull Sporting	28	9	4	15	52	79	−27	31	
11	Meadow Park	28	8	4	16	54	75	−21	28	
12	Gornal	28	8	1	19	51	104	−53	25	
13	Leamington Hibernian	28	6	3	19	35	109	−74	21	
14	Birmingham Tigers	28	3	1	24	33	153	−120	10	
15	BNJS	28	2	3	23	35	99	−64	9	

Updated to match(es) played on 7 April 2025. Source: The FA
Rules for classification: 1) points; 2) goal difference; 3) number of goals scored; 4) number of matches won; 5) head-to-head results
(C) Champions; (P) Promoted
