= 2025–26 Midland Football League =

Midland Football League
- Season: 2025–26

The 2025–26 Midland Football League season is the twelfth in the history of the Midland Football League, a football competition in England. The Midland League operates four divisions in the English football league system, the Premier Division at Step 5, Division One at Step 6, Division Two at Step 7 and Division Three at Step 8; these four divisions are covered by this article.

The allocations for Steps 3 to 6 for this season were announced by The Football Association on 15 May 2025.

== Premier Division ==
This division comprises 18 teams, the same amount as the previous season. AFC Wulfrunians, who competed in the division the previous season, were renamed to AFC Wolverhampton City

The following 5 clubs left the division before the season:

- Atherstone Town - transferred to the United Counties League Premier Division South
- Lichfield City - promoted to the Northern Premier League Division One West
- OJM CFC - relegated to Division One
- Shifnal Town - promoted to the Northern Premier League Division One West
- Wolverhampton Casuals - relegated to the North West Counties League Division One South

The following 5 clubs joined the division:

- Abbey Hulton United - promoted from the North West Counties League Division One South
- Coton Green - promoted from Division One
- Hanley Town - relegated from the Northern Premier League Division One West
- Lye Town - relegated from the Northern Premier League Division One Midlands
- Winsford United - promoted from the North West Counties League Division One South

=== Premier Division table ===
Pos	Team	Pld	W	D	L	GF	GA	GD	Pts	Promotion, qualification or relegation
1	Hanley Town (C, P)	34	22	10	2	91	35	+56	76	Promoted to the Northern Premier League Division One West
2	Northwich Victoria	34	21	9	4	84	30	+54	72	Qualified for the play-offs
3	Winsford United	34	20	7	7	83	36	+47	67	Qualified for the play-offs
4	1874 Northwich (O, P)	34	19	9	6	71	40	+31	66	Qualified for the play-offs
5	AFC Wolverhampton City	34	17	11	6	60	42	+18	62	Qualified for the play-offs
6	Dudley Town	34	19	7	8	85	50	+35	61 (Note: On 22 February 2026, Dudley Town were deducted 3 points for fielding an ineligible player.)	
7	Brocton	34	18	7	9	70	47	+23	61	
8	Abbey Hulton United	34	15	10	9	71	55	+16	55	
9	Lye Town	34	16	6	12	66	60	+6	54	
10	Coton Green	34	13	12	9	52	43	+9	51	Transferred to the United Counties League Premier Division South
11	Whitchurch Alport	34	12	9	13	52	52	0	45	
12	Stone Old Alleynians	34	9	7	18	53	66	−13	34	
13	Romulus	34	9	5	20	53	77	−24	32	
14	Stourport Swifts	34	8	5	21	38	68	−30	29	Transferred to the Hellenic League Premier Division
15	Tividale	34	6	8	20	49	79	−30	26	
16	Uttoxeter Town	34	5	6	23	40	96	−56	21	
17	Highgate United	34	6	3	25	37	95	−58	21	Reprieved from relegation, then transferred to the United Counties League Premier Division South
18	Studley (R)	34	2	7	25	39	123	−84	13	Relegated to the Hellenic League Division One

Source: The FA
Rules for classification: 1) points; 2) goal difference; 3) number of goals scored; 4) number of matches won; 5) head-to-head results
(C) Champions; (O) Play-off winners; (P) Promoted; (R) Relegated

=== Play-offs ===
Semi-finals
2	Northwich Victoria	1 (5)
5	AFC Wolverhampton City	1 (4)
3	Winsford United	2
4	1874 Northwich	4

Final
2	Northwich Victoria	0
4	1874 Northwich	1

==== Semifinals ====
18 April 2026	AFC Wolverhampton City	1–1 (a.e.t.) (4–5 p)	Northwich Victoria	Wolverhampton
15:00 GMT	Houlihan 23'	Report	Cooke 81'	Stadium: Castlecroft Stadium; Attendance: 502
	Penalties
	Penalty missed Penalty scored		Penalty scored

18 April 2026	Winsford United	2–4	1874 Northwich	Winsford
15:00 GMT	Chilufya 6'; Pope 60'	Report	Jennings 39'; Hayes 63', 70'; McGrath 90+9'	Stadium: The Barton Stadium; Attendance: 828

==== Final ====
25 April 2026	Northwich Victoria	0–1	1874 Northwich	Runcorn
15:00			Hayes 68'; Jennings (yellow card) 65' (yellow-red card) 75'	Stadium: Apec Taxis Stadium; Attendance: 1,240

=== Results table ===
Home \ Away	18N	AHU	WVC	BRO	CTG	DUD	HAN	HIG	LYE	NOV	ROM	SOA	SPS	STU	TIV	UTT	WCA	WIN
1874 Northwich	—	4–1	1–1	0–1	1–0	2–2	1–1	5–1	1–2	2–0	1–0	4–4	2–1	4–1	2–1	3–1	3–1	1–0
Abbey Hulton United	3–1	—	0–0	1–1	1–1	3–0	2–2	5–0	2–2	2–2	1–1	3–0	2–1	5–0	4–1	1–2	3–2	0–0
AFC Wolverhampton City	1–1	1–2	—	1–2	2–1	4–0	2–2	3–0	2–1	1–0	2–1	3–1	2–2	0–0	1–1	2–1	1–0	2–2
Brocton	0–1	2–4	2–1	—	0–2	3–1	2–5	5–2	3–5	1–0	2–2	1–1	2–0	7–0	4–2	3–1	3–0	0–1
Coton Green	1–1	0–0	2–4	0–0	—	3–2	1–1	1–0	0–2	1–1	5–2	2–2	1–1	3–0	0–0	1–0	0–3	2–3
Dudley Town	1–1	3–1	2–1	2–1	2–3	—	2–2	2–1	2–1	0–2	6–1	3–1	5–0	11–0	6–3	2–0	1–1	0–3
Hanley Town	2–0	3–1	2–3	1–1	2–1	0–0	—	5–0	3–1	0–1	2–1	2–1	1–0	8–0	2–1	2–0	4–0	2–1
Highgate United	2–4	3–1	1–3	0–1	0–3	0–1	2–5	—	0–1	0–5	2–4	2–2	0–4	2–1	2–1	2–2	2–1	1–7
Lye Town	2–0	2–1	1–2	1–3	1–0	1–1	0–1	1–1	—	3–2	2–5	4–0	1–2	3–1	0–1	3–1	4–0	3–2
Northwich Victoria	1–1	6–1	2–2	2–2	5–2	2–0	1–1	3–0	2–2	—	1–0	2–1	2–1	5–0	6–0	2–0	2–1	3–1
Romulus	0–6	3–4	0–1	2–3	1–2	2–3	1–2	2–0	1–2	1–4	—	1–0	2–1	1–1	2–0	1–4	3–3	0–2
Stone Old Alleynians	1–2	1–2	3–0	1–3	2–2	1–3	2–5	2–1	1–3	0–1	2–0	—	4–0	2–1	3–1	4–0	2–1	0–1
Stourport Swifts	0–4	2–0	0–1	0–0	0–1	0–2	0–7	1–3	0–2	0–3	2–1	1–1	—	4–0	4–1	2–2	0–2	0–1
Studley	1–2	3–5	1–2	0–5	0–3	2–6	2–2	0–1	6–2	0–6	1–3	5–5	5–3	—	0–2	3–3	1–4	1–1
Tividale	0–3	0–2	3–3	3–2	0–1	2–3	2–3	4–3	4–4	0–3	2–2	0–1	2–3	4–1	—	2–2	1–1	0–2
Uttoxeter Town	1–5	1–6	1–3	0–2	2–5	0–7	0–6	3–2	4–4	0–3	1–3	2–1	0–2	1–1	2–1	—	2–4	0–4
Whitchurch Alport	1–1	0–1	2–2	1–3	0–0	2–2	1–3	1–0	1–0	3–3	4–0	3–1	4–0	2–1	1–1	1–0	—	0–2
Winsford United	5–1	3–3	2–1	4–0	2–2	1–2	2–2	6–1	5–0	1–1	3–4	2–0	2–1	6–0	3–1	3–1	0–1	—

Source: The FA
Legend: Blue = home team win; Yellow = draw; Red = away team win.
For upcoming matches, an "a" indicates there is an article about the rivalry between the two participants.

=== Stadia and locations ===
2025–26 First Division South: Location of clubs
Location of the clubs in the 2025–26 Midland League Premier Division
Location of the clubs in the 2025–26 Midland League Premier Division
Location of the clubs in the 2025–26 Midland League Premier Division from Cheshire
Location of the clubs in the 2025–26 Midland League Premier Division from Greater Manchester
Locations

Club	Location	Stadium	Capacity
1874 Northwich	Barnton	The Offside Trust Stadium	3,000
Abbey Hulton United	Abbey Hulton	Birches Head Road	
AFC Wulfrunians	Wolverhampton	Castlecroft Stadium	2,000
Brocton	Brocton	Silkmore Lane	1,500
Coton Green	Fazeley	New Mill Lane	
Dudley Town	Willenhall	Asprey Arena	
Hanley Town	Stoke-on-Trent	Potteries Park	1,300
Highgate United	Shirley	The Coppice	2,000
Lye Town	Lye	Lye Sports Ground	1,000
Northwich Victoria	Runcorn	APEC Taxis Stadium	
Romulus	Birmingham (Castle Vale)	Castle Vale Stadium	2,000
Stone Old Alleynians	Meir Heath	King's Park	
Stourport Swifts	Stourport-on-Severn	Walshes Meadow	2,000
Studley	Studley	The Beehive	
Tividale	Tividale	The Beeches	2,000
Uttoxeter Town	Uttoxeter	Oldfields	
Whitchurch Alport	Whitchurch	Yockings Park	
Winsford United	Winsford	Barton Stadium	3,000

== Division One ==
This division comprises 22 teams, the same amount as the previous season.

The following 3 clubs left the division before the season:

- Coton Green - promoted to the Premier Division
- Nuneaton Town - promoted to the United Counties League Premier Division South
- Paget Rangers - relegated to Division Two

The following 3 clubs joined the division:

- AFC North Kilworth - promoted from the Leicestershire Senior League Premier Division
- Knowle - promoted from Division Two
- Birmingham OJM - relegated from the Premier Division and renamed from OJM CFC

=== Division One table ===
Pos	Team	Pld	W	D	L	GF	GA	GD	Pts	Promotion, qualification or relegation
1	Knowle (C, P)	40	34	4	2	115	27	+88	106	Promoted to the United Counties League Premier Division South
2	Gornal Athletic	40	31	7	2	105	32	+73	100	Qualified for the play-offs
3	Sutton United (O, P)	40	27	5	8	84	38	+46	86	Qualified for the play-offs
4	Heather St John's	40	26	4	10	83	35	+48	82	Qualified for the play-offs
5	Birmingham OJM	40	25	6	9	91	61	+30	81	Qualified for the play-offs
6	Leicester St Andrews	40	24	7	9	103	54	+49	79	
7	Birstall United	40	20	10	10	80	56	+24	70	
8	Bilston Town	40	21	6	13	98	66	+32	69	Transferred to the North West Counties League First Division South
9	AFC North Kilworth	40	16	10	14	39	46	−7	58	
10	AFC Bridgnorth	40	14	11	15	81	88	−7	53	Transferred to the North West Counties League First Division South
11	Lutterworth Athletic	40	13	5	22	61	77	−16	44	
12	Ingles	40	10	12	18	54	61	−7	42	
13	Coventry Copsewood	40	12	6	22	50	82	−32	42	
14	Cradley Town	40	12	6	22	63	104	−41	42	
15	Chelmsley Town	40	9	10	21	54	71	−17	37	
16	Stapenhill	40	9	10	21	57	100	−43	37	
17	Kirby Muxloe	40	9	8	23	53	97	−44	35	
18	Smethwick Rangers	40	9	6	25	51	79	−28	33	
19	Saffron Dynamo	40	8	7	25	43	103	−60	31	
20	Wednesfield	40	7	9	24	33	70	−37	30	Reprieved from relegation, then transferred to the North West Counties League First Division South
21	Nuneaton Griff (R)	40	6	7	27	37	88	−51	25	Relegated to Division Two
22	Allexton & New Parks	0	0	0	0	0	0	0	0	Resigned from the league (Note: On 24 February 2026, Allexton & New Parks resigned from the league, and their playing record of Pld30 W1 D3 L26 GF24 GA128 Pts6 was expunged.)

Source: The FA
Rules for classification: 1) points; 2) goal difference; 3) number of goals scored; 4) number of matches won; 5) head-to-head results
(C) Champions; (O) Play-off winners; (P) Promoted; (R) Relegated

=== Play-offs ===
Semi-finals
2	Gornal Athletic	2
5	Birmingham OJM	1
3	Sutton United	5
4	Heather St John's	0

Final
2	Gornal Athletic	1
3	Sutton United	2

==== Semifinals ====
25 April 2026	Gornal Athletic	2–1	Birmingham OJM	Gornal
15:00	Homer; Crump	Report	Cameron	Stadium: Garden Walk; Attendance: 416

25 April 2026	Sutton United	5–0	Heather St John's	Sutton Coldfield
15:00	Clement; Massey; Mee; Nesbitt; Jeeves	Report		Stadium: Hollyfield Road; Attendance: 704

==== Final ====
2 May 2026	Gornal Athletic	1–2 (a.e.t.)	Sutton United	Gornal
15:00 GMT	Wright 67'	Report	Gildea 27'; Jeeves 96'	Stadium: Garden Walk; Attendance: 1,500

=== Results table ===
Home \ Away	BRI	NKW	BIL	OJM	BIR	CHE	CVC	CRA	GOR	HSJ	ING	KMX	KNW	LSA	LUT	NUG	SFD	SMW	STA	SUT	WED
AFC Bridgnorth	—	1–1	3–4	5–1	3–3	2–1	2–2	3–2	0–3	1–3	2–2	4–0	3–5	1–3	2–4	2–1	3–0	2–1	2–2	0–2	1–0
AFC North Kilworth	1–1	—	2–0	0–1	2–1	1–0	1–3	2–4	0–1	0–2	1–3	0–0	1–2	0–0	1–0	1–0	1–1	1–0	2–1	0–1	1–0
Bilston Town	4–3	2–2	—	1–2	2–1	2–0	4–1	1–1	1–4	0–1	4–0	4–1	1–2	2–0	2–1	3–0	5–0	2–2	4–1	0–2	2–2
Birmingham OJM	3–1	4–0	4–3	—	2–2	4–3	0–2	2–1	1–1	2–1	2–0	6–2	1–2	5–3	5–1	3–1	0–1	2–0	1–2	2–0	1–1
Birstall United	2–0	1–1	4–5	2–3	—	1–1	4–1	2–0	3–3	2–0	2–1	1–2	0–2	0–4	2–0	0–3	2–1	1–0	6–2	2–0	1–0
Chelmsley Town	4–3	1–2	0–3	1–2	0–0	—	2–1	5–3	2–3	1–3	1–2	0–1	0–0	1–2	0–2	1–1	4–2	2–1	2–2	2–3	2–1
Coventry Copsewood	1–3	1–2	2–0	1–3	2–2	1–1	—	1–0	0–2	1–4	2–1	1–1	0–2	4–1	2–3	1–0	0–1	0–4	3–1	2–5	1–1
Cradley Town	2–1	2–0	1–2	1–8	1–8	1–3	3–2	—	0–2	1–5	0–0	0–0	1–6	0–4	3–3	4–3	3–2	2–2	3–0	1–2	1–2
Gornal Athletic	3–3	1–1	2–1	1–0	3–1	3–0	5–0	5–3	—	1–3	3–0	2–2	2–2	0–1	2–0	2–1	5–0	5–0	5–0	2–1	3–0
Heather St John's	1–1	1–0	1–2	5–1	0–1	1–1	5–0	4–1	0–1	—	1–0	3–1	0–1	2–3	3–0	3–0	3–0	3–2	0–0	1–2	2–0
Ingles	1–4	0–1	2–2	2–2	0–1	2–0	0–4	3–0	0–1	0–1	—	1–1	1–3	3–3	2–0	1–1	3–0	1–1	0–1	1–1	1–1
Kirby Muxloe	3–4	0–1	1–6	0–2	0–4	2–2	2–0	3–5	0–1	2–1	1–4	—	2–5	1–6	0–1	4–1	1–1	3–5	0–2	0–3	3–1
Knowle	7–0	3–0	2–1	2–0	1–1	3–0	3–0	2–0	0–1	1–1	3–2	2–1	—	4–2	2–0	4–0	3–1	5–0	7–0	4–0	3–0
Leicester St Andrews	3–3	2–0	0–1	2–2	1–1	2–0	2–0	5–0	1–7	1–2	2–2	5–0	0–1	—	3–1	4–0	5–0	1–0	5–3	2–0	3–2
Lutterworth Athletic	6–0	0–1	5–1	2–3	1–2	1–1	3–0	1–3	2–3	1–2	1–5	1–2	2–6	0–5	—	3–0	1–1	0–2	2–1	0–3	2–1
Nuneaton Griff	2–3	2–2	0–4	0–1	1–3	2–2	1–3	0–1	0–5	0–3	0–2	0–4	1–2	1–1	0–1	—	1–0	1–0	2–2	0–2	4–1
Saffron Dynamo	1–3	0–2	1–7	2–2	1–2	2–1	1–1	2–5	2–3	0–1	2–1	3–0	0–4	1–6	0–4	3–2	—	0–2	3–2	0–5	2–0
Smethwick Rangers	0–3	1–0	2–1	3–4	2–4	2–1	1–2	1–1	0–1	0–3	1–3	0–3	0–3	2–3	1–2	1–2	3–1	—	3–3	0–1	1–3
Stapenhill	1–1	2–3	3–7	0–2	2–2	0–2	0–2	2–0	0–5	0–3	4–2	4–2	1–4	1–0	2–2	1–3	3–3	2–2	—	0–1	2–0
Sutton United	2–2	0–0	4–1	2–3	0–2	2–1	5–0	4–1	1–1	4–2	1–0	3–0	1–0	0–3	2–2	6–0	2–0	2–1	3–0	—	4–0
Wednesfield	1–0	1–2	1–1	2–0	3–1	0–3	1–0	1–2	0–2	0–3	0–0	2–2	0–2	1–4	1–0	0–0	2–2	0–2	1–2	0–2	—

Source: The FA
Legend: Blue = home team win; Yellow = draw; Red = away team win.
For upcoming matches, an "a" indicates there is an article about the rivalry between the two participants.

=== Stadia and locations ===
Location of the West Midlands clubs in the 2025–26 Midland League Division One
Location of the Leicestershire clubs in the 2025–26 Midland League Division One
Location of the West Midlands clubs in the 2025–26 Midland League Division One
Locations of Northern Premier League 2025–26 Division One Midlands teams

Club	Location	Stadium	Capacity
AFC Bridgnorth	Bridgnorth	Crown Meadow	
AFC North Kilworth	North Kilworth	North Kilworth Sports and Football Club	
Allexton & New Parks	Leicester	New College Leicester	
Bilston Town	Bilston	Queen Street	4,000
Birmingham OJM	Birmingham (Kings Norton)	Triplex Sports Ground	
Birstall United	Birstall	Meadow Lane	
Chelmsley Town	Coleshill	Pack Meadow	
Coventry Copsewood	Coventry	Allard Way	2,000
Cradley Town	Cradley	Beeches View	
Gornal Athletic	Lower Gornal	Garden Walk Stadium	1,500
Heather St John's	Heather	St John's Park	2,050
Ingles	Thringstone	Homestead Road	2,050
Kirby Muxloe	Kirby Muxloe	Ratby Lane	3,000
Knowle	Knowle	Robins' Nest	
Leicester St Andrews	Aylestone	Canal Street	1,000
Lutterworth Athletic	Lutterworth	Hall Park	
Nuneaton Griff	Nuneaton	Pingles Stadium	4,000
Saffron Dynamo	Cosby	Kings Park	
Smethwick Rangers	Boldmere	Trevor Brown Memorial Ground	2,500
Stapenhill	Stapenhill	Edge Hill	1,500
Sutton United	Sutton Coldfield	Coleshill Road	
Wednesfield	Wednesfield	Cottage Ground	

== Division Two ==
This division comprises 16 teams, one more than the previous season.

The following 2 clubs left the division before the season:

- Knowle - promoted to Division One
- Littleton - transferred to Herefordshire Football League Premier Division

The following 3 clubs joined the division:

- Boldmere Sports & Social Falcons - promoted from Division Three
- Paget Rangers - relegated from Division One
- Wake Green Amateur - promoted from Division Three

=== Division Two table ===
Pos	Team	Pld	W	D	L	GF	GA	GD	Pts	Promotion, qualification or relegation
1	Northfield Town (C, P)	28	24	2	2	106	27	+79	74	Promoted to Division One
2	Cadbury Athletic	28	19	5	4	79	23	+56	62	
3	Earlswood Town	28	19	5	4	60	32	+28	62	
4	Fairfield Villa	28	14	7	7	64	34	+30	49	
5	Birmingham United	28	16	4	8	82	53	+29	49 (Note: On 17 February 2026, Birmingham United were deducted 3 points for fielding an ineligible player.)	
6	Central Ajax	28	14	4	10	55	50	+5	46	
7	Wake Green Amateur	28	14	7	7	54	41	+13	40 (Note: On 30 October 2025, Wake Green Amateur were deducted 9 points.)	
8	AFC Solihull	28	10	9	9	59	44	+15	39	
9	Hampton	28	9	7	12	46	61	−15	34	
10	Paget Rangers	28	8	5	15	52	61	−9	29	
11	Inkberrow	28	8	5	15	46	62	−16	29	
12	Bolehall Swifts	28	8	5	15	39	60	−21	29	
13	Coventry Alvis	28	4	5	19	37	84	−47	17	
14	Coventrians	28	4	3	21	27	105	−78	15	
15	Lane Head (R)	28	2	1	25	22	91	−69	7	Relegated to Division Three
16	Boldmere Sports & Social Falcons	0	0	0	0	0	0	0	0	Results expunged (Note: Boldmere Sports & Social Falcons had their playing record of Pld14 W7 D4 L3 GD41 GA15 Pts25 expunged.)

Source: The FA
Rules for classification: 1) points; 2) goal difference; 3) number of goals scored; 4) number of matches won; 5) head-to-head results
(C) Champions; (P) Promoted; (R) Relegated

=== Stadia and locations ===
Location of the West Midlands clubs in the 2025–26 Midland League Division Two
Location of the West Midlands clubs in the 2025–26 Midland League Division Two
Locations of Northern Premier League 2025–26 Division One Midlands teams

Club	Location	Stadium
AFC Solihull	Earlswood	Rumbush Lane
Birmingham United	Birmingham	Castle Vale (Groundshare with Romulus)
Boldmere Sports & Social Falcons	Sutton Coldfield	Boldmere Sports & Social Club
Bolehall Swifts	Bolehall	Rene Road
Cadbury Athletic	Birmingham	Moseley Rugby Club
Central Ajax	Budbrooke	Ajax Park
Coventrians	Keresley End	Colliery Sports Ground
Coventry Alvis	Coventry	Alvis Sports & Social Club
Earlswood Town	Earlswood	The Pavilions
Fairfield Villa	Fairfield	Stourbridge Road
Hampton	Solihull	Field Lane
Inkberrow	Inkberrow	Sands Road (Groundshare with Sporting Club Inkberrow)
Lane Head	Bloxwich	Somerfield Road
Northfield Town	Northfield	Shenley Lane
Paget Rangers	Birmingham	Castle Vale (Groundshare with Romulus)
Wake Green Amateur	Shirley	The Holloway

== Division Three ==
This division comprises 16 teams, one more than the previous season. Balsall/Berkswell changed their name to AFC Balsall, and Solihull Sporting changed their name to Arden Forest Sporting.

The following 4 clubs left the division before the season:

- Boldmere Sports & Social Falcons - promoted to Division Two
- Feckenham - dissolved.
- Meadow Park
- Wake Green Amateur - promoted to Division Two

The following 5 clubs joined the division:

- Coventry Colliery - promoted from Coventry Alliance Football League Premier Division
- Coventry Dunlop (Community) - promoted from Coventry Alliance Football League Premier Division
- Diamonds Academy - transferred from Birmingham & District Football League Division Three
- Solihull Youth Academy - new team
- Walsall Wood - resigned from Northern Premier League Division One Midlands

=== Division Three table ===
Pos	Team	Pld	W	D	L	GF	GA	GD	Pts	Promotion, qualification or relegation
1	Coventry Colliery (C, P)	28	24	3	1	101	22	+79	75	Promoted to Division Two
2	Kenilworth Sporting (P)	28	22	1	5	98	35	+63	67	Promoted to Division Two
3	Solihull Youth Academy	28	21	3	4	93	31	+62	66	
4	Silhill	28	17	3	8	71	36	+35	54	
5	Walsall Wood	28	17	1	10	69	49	+20	52	
6	AFC Balsall	28	17	1	10	83	49	+34	51 (Note: On 24 August 2025, AFC Balsall were deducted 1 point for fielding an ineligible player.)	
7	Coventry Dunlop (Community)	27	15	3	9	62	46	+16	48	
8	Leamington Hibernian	28	11	3	14	49	64	−15	36	
9	Continental Star	28	11	1	16	46	69	−23	34	
10	AFC Birmingham	28	10	2	16	41	67	−26	32	
11	Gornal	27	7	4	16	53	70	−17	25	
12	BNJS	28	6	1	21	41	75	−34	19	
13	Arden Forest Sporting	28	5	4	19	38	108	−70	19	
14	Diamonds Academy	28	6	2	20	36	81	−45	14 (Note: On 3 December 2025, Diamonds Academy were deducted 3 points for failure to fulfil a fixture. They were deducted a further 3 points on 28 December 2025 for fielding an ineligible player.)	
15	Birmingham Tigers	28	3	2	23	24	103	−79	11	
16	Castle Vale Town	0	0	0	0	0	0	0	0	Results expunged (Note: Castle Vale Town had their playing record of Pld9 W2 D0 L7 GD11 GA25 Pts6 expunged.)

Updated to match(es) played on 9 May 2026. Source: The FA
Rules for classification: 1) points; 2) goal difference; 3) number of goals scored; 4) number of matches won; 5) head-to-head results
(C) Champions; (P) Promoted

=== Stadia and locations ===
Location of the West Midlands clubs in the 2025–26 Midland League Division Three
Location of the Warwickshire clubs in the 2025–26 Midland League Division Three

Club	Location	Stadium
AFC Balsall	Coventry	Massey Ferguson Sports Ground
AFC Birmingham	Halesowen	Illey Lane
Arden Forest Sporting	Fordbridge	Tudor Grange Academy Kingshurst
BNJS	Smethwick	Hadley Stadium
Birmingham Tigers	Smethwick	Hadley Stadium
Castle Vale Town	Castle Vale	Vale Stadium (Groundshare with Romulus)
Continental Star	Perry Barr	Holford Drive
Coventry Colliery	Allesley	Hawkesmill Sports Club
Coventry Dunlop (Community)	Coventry	Dunlop Sports and Social Club
Diamonds Academy	Walsall	University of Wolverhampton Walsall Campus
Gornal	Wombourne	Wombourne Leisure Centre
Kenilworth Sporting	Kenilworth	Gypsy Lane
Leamington Hibernian	Solihull	Field Lane (Groundshare with Hampton)
Silhill	Solihull	Sharmans Cross Road
Solihull Youth Academy	Solihull	Tudor Grange Academy Solihull
Walsall Wood	Walsall	John Sylvester Stadium
