= Birmingham and District Football League =

Association football league in England

- Founded: 1908; 118 years ago
- Country: England
- Feeder to: Midland Football League
- Domestic cup(s): Bill Cup; Holder Cup; Intermediate Cup; Jeffs Cup; Junior Cup; Minor Cup; Senior Cup; Veterans Cup; Junior Cup
- Website: Official website

The Birmingham and District Football League (formerly the Birmingham & District Amateur Football Association and often referred to as the Birmingham AFA) is an amateur association football competition covering the city of Birmingham, England, and the surrounding area, for football teams playing on a Saturday.

The competition is not part of the English football league system, however the league is affiliated to the Birmingham County Football Association. The league is composed of eight divisions, containing around 100 teams.

== Cup competitions ==
The Birmingham Football League currently hosts nine cup competitions which consist of the following:

- Bill Hill Cup
- Holder Cup
- Intermediate Cup
- Jeffs Cup
- Junior Cup
- Minor Cup
- Senior Cup
- Veterans Cup
- Youth Cup

== History ==
The Association was formed in 1908 with friendly games and a knock-out competition (Chatrian Cup). It was not until 1922 that a league competition was introduced, originally with three Senior Divisions and two Junior Divisions. This has grown to the current Premier Division and a further 8 lower Divisions. While there is promotion and relegation between Divisions One to Seven, the four teams that finish at the bottom of the Premier Division instead have to apply for re-election, and any team from a lower division can in theory apply to replace them as long as they meet facilities criteria. After 108 years as the Birmingham AFA a vote was taken by the Association's members for the 2015-16 season to end the Association status and change the name of the organisation to the Birmingham & District Football League.

== Past presidents ==
Below is a list of past presidents of the Birmingham & District AFA:

- Victor Jones 1908 – 1930
- L.T. Roberts 1930 – 1932
- J. Drinkwater 1932 – 1934
- Sir Edmund Crane 1934 – 1939
- F.J. Wicmam 1939 - 1946
- Sir Edmund Crane 1946 – 1947
- D. Mansell 1947 – 1949
- J. Waldron 1949 – 1951
- W.F. Jones 1951 – 1953
- H.S. Smith 1953 – 1955
- N.E. Brookes 1955 – 1957
- J.P. Weaver 1957 – 1959
- H.R. Holder 1959 – 1960
- N.A. Jeffs 1960 – 1962
- F.G.N. Moreton 1962 – 1965
- C.F. Ewins (M.B.E) 1965 – 1968
- H.S. Smith 1968 – 1969
- E.L. Hitchman 1969 – 1972
- C.H. Patten 1972 – 1975
- E.R. Webb 1975 – 1977
- H.H. Jones 1977 – 1980
- F.H. Reynolds 1980 – 1983
- W.G. Hill 1983 – 1986
- S.W. Sims 1986 – 1989
- P. Witcomb 1989 – 1992
- N.L. Worskett 1992 – 1995
- G.G. Wilson 1995 – 1998
- C.J. Biddle 1998 – 2001
- D.J. Winzor 2001 – 2004
- S. Hill 2004 – 2007
- S. Durham 2007 – 2010
- R. Bowl 2010 – 2013
- R. Windsor 2013 – Present

== Member clubs 2025–26 ==
Premier Division	Stadium
Birmingham University Medics	Four Dwellings Academy, Quinton
Boldmere Sports & Social Falcons	Boldmere Road, Sutton Coldfield
Galore	University of Wolverhampton Walsall Site, Walsall
Glades	Glades Football Centre, Solihull
Hall Green Sports Club	Aston University Recreation Centre, Great Barr
Kawala	Lordswood Girls School, Harborne
Northfield Town	Shenley Lane, Northfield
Polesworth North Warwick	North Warwickshire Recreation Centre, Polesworth
Silhill	Sharmans Cross Road, Solihull
Sutton United Reserves	Coleshill Road, Sutton Coldfield
Village	Aston University Recreation Centre, Great Barr
Wake Green Amateur	The Holloway, Shirley

Division One	Stadium
Bromsgrove Rovers	Eldorado Close, Studley
Desi	Aston University Recreation Centre, Great Barr
FC Stratford	Spring Lane, Erdington
Hampton Sports	Field Lane, Solihull
Hollyfields	Woodacre Road, Erdington
Hopwood Swifts	South Bromsgrove High School, Bromsgrove
Kings Heath Rangers	Light Hall School, Shirley
North Solihull	Pinewood Playing Fields, Marston Green
Silhill 'B'	Sharmans Cross Road, Solihull
Sutton United 'A'	Coleshill Road, Sutton Coldfield
Village 'B'	Aston University Recreation Centre, Great Barr

Division Two	Stadium
Armada	Calthorpe Park, Balsall Heath
Benson Cresconians	Tat Bank Road, Oldbury
Birmingham Irish	Willclare Sports Society, Gilbertstone
Frenchwalls	Ormiston Sandwell Community Academy, Tividale
Henley Forest of Arden	Arden Recreation Centre, Wootton Wawen
ISSA	Chris Nicholl Soccer Centre, Walsall
MOTD	Woodfield Academy, Redditch
Nechells Athletic	Rupert Street, Nechells
Phoenix Town	Cooksey Lane, Kingstanding
Redditch Borough	Cherry Tree Walk, Batchley
Wake Green Amateur 'B'	The Holloway, Shirley
Walsall Phoenix	The Green, Aldridge

Division Three	Stadium
AFC Bromsgrove	Glyn Mitchell Memorial Ground, Droitwich Spa
Arden Forest	Tudor Grange Academy, Fordbridge
Bartley Reds 'B'	Tat Bank Road, Oldbury
Birmingham United U21	The Pavilion, Perry Barr
Boldmere Sports & Social Falcons 'B'	Boldmere Road, Sutton Coldfield
Castlecroft Rangers	Codsall Community High School, Codsall
Claverdon	Trinity High School, Redditch
Oldbury United	Ormiston Sandwell Community Academy, Tividale
Polesworth North Warwick 'B'	North Warwickshire Recreation Centre, Polesworth
Real Aston	The Pavilion, Perry Barr
Sutton United 'B'	Coleshill Road, Sutton Coldfield
Village 'C'	Aston University Recreation Centre, Great Barr
Wednesbury Sports Union	Pleck Park, Walsall

Division Four	Stadium
Birmingham University Medics 'B'	Four Dwellings Academy, Quinton
BNJS	Tat Bank Road, Oldbury
Bromsgrove Rovers 'B'	Eldorado Close, Studley
BRS United	Elmdon Playing Field, Selly Park
Kings Heath Rangers 'B'	Land Rover Sports & Social Club, Solihull
North Birmingham United	Alexander Stadium, Perry Barr
Olton Ravens	Land Rover Sports & Social Club, Solihull
Sikh Hunters	Aston University Recreation Centre, Great Barr
Silhill 'C'	Sharmans Cross Road, Solihull
Sutton United 'C'	Coleshill Road, Sutton Coldfield
Thimblemill Rec	
Wake Green Amateur 'C'	The Holloway, Shirley
Walsall Phoenix 'B'	The Green, Aldridge

Division Five	Stadium
Bartley Reds 'C'	
Bluepool	Tythe Barn Lane, Shirley
BRS United 'B'	Elmdon Playing Field, Selly Park
Crusaders	Rowheath Pavilion, Bournville
Flamengo	Rowheath Pavilion, Bournville
Glades 'B'	Glades Football Centre, Solihull
Nechells Athletic 'B'	Rupert Street, Nechells
Phantom HK	Lift, Tamworth
Punjab United	Portway Lifestyle Centre, Oldbury
Village 'D'	Aston University Recreation Centre, Great Barr
Wake Green Amateur 'D'	The Holloway, Shirley
Warstones Wanderers	Codsall Community High School, Codsall

== Former champions ==
- 1922–23 – Wolverhampton Amateurs ^{[A]}
- 1923–24 – Walsall Phoenix
- 1924–25 – Wolverhampton Amateurs ^{[A]}
- 1925–26 – Headlingley
- 1926–27 – Wolverhampton Amateurs ^{[A]}
- 1927–28 – Wolverhampton Amateurs ^{[A]}
- 1928–29 – Old Wulfrunians ^{[B]}
- 1929–30 – Wolverhampton Amateurs ^{[A]}
- 1930–31 – Birmingham Gas Officials
- 1931–32 – Erdington House
- 1932–33 – Erdington House
- 1933–34 – Erdington House
- 1934–35 – Walsall Jolly
- 1935–36 – Moor Green
- 1936–37 – Boldmere St Michaels
- 1937–38 – Walsall Jolly
- 1938–39 – Walsall Jolly
- 1939–47 – Not held during the Second World War
- 1947–48 – Holly Lodge Old Boys
- 1948–49 – Hay Green
- 1949–50 – Walsall Phoenix
- 1950–51 – Staffordshire Casuals ^{[A]}
- 1951–52 – Staffordshire Casuals ^{[A]}
- 1952–53 – Staffordshire Casuals ^{[A]}
- 1953–54 – Old Wulfrunians
- 1954–55 – Walsall Phoenix
- 1955–56 – Cresconians
- 1956–57 – Cresconians
- 1957–58 – Aston Villa Amateurs
- 1958–59 – Aston Villa Amateurs
- 1959–60 – Aston Villa Amateurs
- 1960–61 – Silhill
- 1961–62 – Cresconians
- 1962–63 – Handsworth GSOB
- 1963–64 – Dudley Old Boys
- 1964–65 – Dudley Old Boys
- 1965–66 – Dudley Old Boys
- 1966–67 – Penncroft
- 1967–68 – Penncroft
- 1968–69 – Penncroft
- 1969–70 – Penncroft
- 1970–71 – Cradley Chain & Castings
- 1971–72 – Walsall Phoenix
- 1972–73 – Silhill
- 1973–74 – Cradley Chain & Castings
- 1974–75 – Hall End Amateurs
- 1975–76 – Old Throstles
- 1976–77 – Cresconians
- 1977–78 – Cresconians
- 1978–79 – Old Dudleians
- 1979–80 – Old Wulfrunians
- 1980–81 – Old Throstles
- 1981–82 – Wolverhampton Casuals ^{[A]}
- 1982–83 – Sutton United
- 1983–84 – Sutton United
- 1984–85 – Sutton United
- 1985–86 – Staffordshire Casuals ^{[A]}
- 1986–87 – Colinthians
- 1987–88 – Wake Green Amateurs
- 1988–89 – Wake Green Amateurs
- 1989–90 – Wake Green Amateurs
- 1990–91 – Wake Green Amateurs
- 1991–92 – Old Wulfrunians
- 1992–93 – Dunlop Sports
- 1993–94 – Wake Green Amateurs
- 1994–95 – Dunlop Sports
- 1995–96 – Wake Green Amateurs
- 1996–97 – Causeway United
- 1997–98 – Causeway United
- 1998–99 – Smethwick Hall Old Boys
- 1999-00 – Village
- 2000–01 – Old Wulfrunians
- 2001–02 – New Fullbrook
- 2002–03 – Old Wulfrunians
- 2003–04 – Old Wulfrunians
- 2004–05 – Old Wulfrunians
- 2005–06 – Lakin Rangers
- 2006–07 – Sutton United
- 2007–08 – Village
- 2008–09 – Shirley Athletic
- 2009–10 – Sutton United
- 2010–11 – Sutton United
- 2011–12 – Sutton United
- 2012–13 – Village
- 2013–14 – Old Wulfrunians
- 2014–15 – Old Wulfrunians
- 2015–16 - Wake Green Amateur
- 2016–17 - Wake Green Amateur
- 2017–18 - Village
- 2018–19 - Nineveh
- 2019–20 - Void due to COVID-19 pandemic
- 2020–21 - Void due to COVID-19 pandemic
- 2021–22 - CPA
- 2022–23 - Silhill
- 2023–24 - CPA
- 2024–25 - CPA

== Notes ==
- A. Wolverhampton Amateurs became Staffordshire Amateurs in 1946. In 1981–82 the club's first team joined the West Midlands (Regional) League as Wolverhampton Casuals but three teams continued playing in the Birmingham AFA as both Wolverhampton Casuals and Staffordshire Casuals.
- B. A different Old Wulfrunians (1908–39) from the current Old Wulfrunians (1926– ) playing in the Birmingham AFA.
