= Barton Stadium =

Barton Stadium may refer to:

- Barton Stadium (Winsford), a stadium used by Winsford United F.C. and 1874 Northwich F.C.
- City of Salford Stadium, a proposed rugby league stadium for Salford City Reds
- Peter Barton Lacrosse Stadium, the home of Denver Pioneers men's lacrosse
