= New College Leicester =

The Herewoode Academy

Location
- Greencoat Road; New Parks; Leicester, Leicestershire, LE3 6RN; England; 52.6421°N 1.1799°W

Information
- Type: Foundation school
- Local authority: Leicester City Council
- Department for Education URN: 131945 Tables
- Ofsted: Reports
- Head Teacher: mr.modi
- Gender: Coeducational
- Age: 11 to 16
- Website: www.theherewoodeacademy.co.uk/

The Herewoode Academy (formed in 1999/2000 in a merger between New Parks Community College, Alderman Newton's School, and Wycliffe Community College) is a coeducational foundation secondary school and sixth form, located in the New Parks area of Leicester in the English county of Leicestershire.

The Herewoode Academy became a foundation school in June 2010. As a foundation school it is administered by a trust which includes Leicester City Council, Wyggeston and Queen Elizabeth I College and the CfBT Education Trust.

The school offers GCSEs, BTECs and ASDAN qualifications as programmes of study for pupils; those in the sixth form have the option to study from a range of A Levels and further BTECs.

Allexton & New Parks F.C. of the Midland League Division One and play at the football facility.
