= Birmingham OJM F.C. =

Association football club in England

Coordinates: 52.4129°N 1.9367°W

Birmingham OJM
- Full name: Birmingham OJM Community Football Club
- Nickname: The Rangers
- Founded: 1996
- Ground: Triplex Sports Ground, Kings Norton
- Chairman: Paul Garner
- Manager: Stewart Watkins/Adam Younis
- League: Midland League Division One
- 2025–26: Midland League Division One, 5th of 21
Home colours	Away colours

Birmingham OJM Community Football Club is a football club currently based in the Kings Norton area of Birmingham, England. They are currently members of the Midland League Division One and play at the Triplex Sports Ground.

== History ==
The club was established in 1996 as Black Country Rangers. In 2007 they joined Division Two of the West Midlands (Regional) League. The club were Division Two champions in 2009–10, earning promotion to Division One. They were Division One champions the following season and were promoted to the Premier Division. Their first season in the Premier Division saw them finish as runners-up. The club also won the JW Hunt Cup, beating AFC Wulfrunians 4–3 in the final. They retained the cup the following season with a 4–3 win over Wolverhampton Casuals. In 2018 the club was restructured and renamed Black Country Football Club, although the first team continued to play under the name Black Country Rangers.

At the end of the 2020–21 season Black Country Rangers were transferred to Division One of the Midland League when the Premier Division of the West Midlands (Regional) League lost its status as a step six division. The club finished fifth in Division One in 2022–23, qualifying for the promotion play-offs. They subsequently lost 1–0 to Ashby Ivanhoe in the semi-finals. In 2023 the club was renamed OJM Community Football Club and relocated to the Triplex Sports Ground in Kings Norton, Birmingham. The 2023–24 season saw them finish third in Division One. In the subsequent play-offs they beat Ingles 2–0 in the semi-finals, before defeating Droitwich Spa on penalties in the final to earn promotion to the Premier Division. Although they finished eighth in the Premier Division the following season, they were relegated back to Division One after failing ground grading requirements.

In 2025 the club was again renamed, this time to Birmingham OJM. They finished fifth in Division One in 2025–26 before losing 2–1 to Gornal Athletic in the play-off semi-finals.

== Honours ==
- West Midlands (Regional) League
  - Division One champions 2010–11
  - Division Two champions 2009–10
- JW Hunt Cup
  - Winners 2011–12, 2012–13

== Records ==
- Best FA Cup performance: Preliminary round, 2020–21, 2020–21
- Best FA Vase performance: Second round, 2012–13
