= Allexton & New Parks F.C. =

Association football club in England

Coordinates: 52°38′29.43″N 1°10′41.44″W

Allexton & New Parks
- Full name: Allexton & New Parks Football Club
- Founded: 1996; 30 years ago
- Ground: New College Leicester, Leicester
- Chairman: Maurice Allen
- Manager: Matthew Deacon
- League: Midland League Division One
- 2025–26: Midland League Division One (resigned)
Home colours

Allexton & New Parks Football Club is a football club based in Leicester, England. They are currently members of the Midland League Division One and play at New College Leicester, Leicester.

== History ==
Allexton & New Parks were founded in 1996, initially as a youth football club in the New Parks area of Leicester. Going into open age football, the club joined the Leicester & District League, before joining the Leicestershire Senior League in 2012. In their first season, in the Leicestershire Senior League, Allexton & New Parks won the Division One title, winning the Premier Division a year later. In 2024, the club was admitted into the Midland League Division One, after winning the Leicestershire Senior League for a second time. On 24 February 2026, the club resigned from the Midland League Division One.

== Ground ==
The club currently play at New College Leicester, Leicester.

== Records ==
- FA Vase
  - First Qualifying Round 2024–25
