= A.F.C. North Kilworth =

Association football club in England

- Ground: North Kilworth Sports Club
- League: Midland League Division One
- 2025–26: Midland League Division One, 9th of 21
Home colours

A.F.C. North Kilworth is a football club based in North Kilworth, England. They are currently members of the Midland League Division One.

== History ==
Originally founded as North Kilworth F.C. in 1987 and reformed in 2018 as North Kilworth Sports, A.F.C. North Kilworth joined the Leicestershire Senior League for the 2020–21 season. They remained in this league until the 2024–25 season, at the end of which they finished third (of 15) in the Premier Division. They were then promoted to the Midland Football League for the 2025–26 season.

== Records ==
- Best FA Vase performance: First Round 2026-27
