= Fairfield Villa F.C. =

English association football club

Fairfield Villa
- Full name: Fairfield Villa Football Club
- Nickname: Villa
- Founded: 1902
- Ground: Fairfield Recreation Ground, Fairfield
- Chairman: Paul Oakes
- Manager: Keith Draper & Jason Hancox
- League: Midland League Division Two
- 2025–26: Midland League Division Two, 4th of 15
- Website: https://www.pitchero.com/clubs/fairfieldvillafc
Home colours	Away colours

Fairfield Villa Football Club is an amateur football club based in the village of Fairfield, near Bromsgrove, Worcestershire, England. They currently compete in the Midland League Division Two and play at the Fairfield Recreation Ground.

== History ==
The club was founded in 1902 and first played in the original Bromsgrove Football League. They had a successful first season, winning the league title at their first attempt. In the early 1950s, the club disbanded but was reformed by Gill Webb and Paddy Eades. 1959 saw the club begin playing at their current home ground, the Fairfield Recreation Ground, and rejoin the Bromsgrove Football League. Between 1959 and the 1970s, Villa had a fair amount of success in league and cup, before joining the Kidderminster & District League. The club went on to win the Premier Division twice in 1982–83 and 1983–84. The club joined the Midland Combination Division Two in 1985, and won promotion to Division One in 1995. However, the Recreation Ground's facilities did not meet the requirements for the division, leading to a dispute between the club and the ground's landlords. Villa were forced to groundshare with Bromsgrove Rovers and later Northfield Town. In 1996, they were relegated back to Division One. They won Division Two again in the 1998–99 season. In 2002, the club returned to the Fairfield Recreation Ground after reaching an agreement with the landlords who allowed a small development at the ground, making it meet requirements for the division. In 2012, after several seasons of cup successes, the Recreation Ground saw another development when, with the help of an FA grant, new changing rooms and a kitchen were installed. The club finished Division One runners-up on goal difference in the 2013–14 season, before the Midland Combination merged with the Midland Alliance to form the Midland League, with Fairfield being placed in Division Two.

== Honours ==
- Bromsgrove Football League champions, 1902–03
- Kidderminster & District League Premier Division champions, 1982–83 & 1983–84
- Midland Combination Division Two champions, 1998–99
