= Kidderminster & District Football League =

Association football league in England

The Kidderminster & District League is an English amateur league, affiliated to the Worcestershire County F.A for teams based near Kidderminster, which therefore draws teams from Worcestershire and South Staffordshire. The league now operates Sunday league football and a women's division. Prior to 2014 it was known as Kidderminster & District Saturday League and operated Saturday divisions.

Successful teams from this league could apply for promotion to the West Midlands (Regional) League. Teams to have progressed to the higher level include Ludlow Town (1979), Bandon (1995), Bewdley Town (1999), Brintons Athletic (2000), Ounsdale (2000), and Tenbury United (2003).

== Champions ==
The champions of the league's various divisions have been as follows:

Season	Premier Division	Division One	Division Two	Division Three
1974–75	Springvale Rovers	Broadheath	Plough Trysull	No Division Three
1975–76	Victoria	Bewdley Old Boys	UGA Dynamoes	No Division Three
1976–77	Springvale Rovers	UGA Dynamoes	Quayle Carpets	No Division Three
1977–78	Roma	Stourport Swifts	Kinver Reserves	No Division Three
1978–79	Kinver	Chaddesley Corbett	Naylors	No Division Three
1979–80	Springvale Rovers	Chainwire	Brintons Reserves	No Division Three
1980–81	Brintons	Webb Corbett	Two Gates Reserves	No Division Three
1981–82	Fairfield Villa	Highley Welfare	Enville Athletic	No Division Three
1982–83	Brintons	Broadwaters Sports	Clee Hill United	No Division Three
1983–84	Fairfield Villa	Brintons Reserves	C.L.C. Windmill	No Division Three
1984–85	Brintons	Star Aluminium	Netherton Liberal Youth	No Division Three
1985–86	Springvale Rovers	Wyre Forest Construction	Bewdley Town Reserves	No Division Three
1986–87	Star Aluminium	Upton Town	Star Aluminium Reserves	No Division Three
1987–88	Wyre Forest Construction	Stourport Swifts Reserves	Roundhead	No Division Three
1988–89	Woofferton	Ludlow Town Reserves	SDF Sports	Wollescote Hare & Hounds
1989–90	Woofferton	Highley Welfare	Cavalier 89	Belgrave
1990–91	Wyre Forest	Bandon Arms	Wordsley	Wordsley Star
1991–92	Wyre Forest	Star Aluminium	Forest Inn 90	Edgecliff Eagles
1992–93	Brintons Chainwire	Forest 90	Bewdley Town Reserves	Horn & Trumpet
1993–94	Cradley Heath	Edgecliff Eagles	Blackheath Electrodrives	Ounsdale
1994–95	Bandon	Clee Hill United	Cradley Heath Reserves	
1995–96	Clee Hill United	Britannia 90	Kinver Reserves	
1996–97	Highley Welfare	Blue Ball Athletic	Claines Reserves	
1997–98	Brintons Chainwire	Ashwood United	Tenbury United	
1998–99	Ounsdale	Tenbury United	Cookley Social	
1999–00	Brintons Chainwire	Cookley Social	Broughton WMC	
2000–01	Chaddesley Corbett	Norton Celtic	Samson & Lion 2000	
2001–02	Norton Celtic	Springvale Rovers	Discontinued	
2002–03	Cookley Social	Castle Inn 2000		
2003–04	Cradley Heath Timbertree	Quarry Bank		
2004–05	Cradley Heath	Gemini		
2005–06	Wyre Forest	Gigmill		
2006–07	Wyre Forest	Dog and Pheasant		
2007–08	Gigmill	Kings Heath Old Boys		
2008-09	Wyre Forest	Furnace Sports		
2009-10	Wyre Forest	Lodge Farm		
2010-11	Birch Coppice	Dudley Villa		
2011-12				
2012-13	Netherton Athletic			
2013-14	Netherton Athletic			
