= Ormiston Sandwell Community Academy =

Location
- Lower City Road; Tividale; Oldbury, West Midlands, B69 2HE; England; 52.510°N 2.040°W

Information
- Type: Comprehensive; Academy
- Established: 2009
- Local authority: Sandwell
- Department for Education URN: 135979 Tables
- Ofsted: Reports
- Principal: Peter Mckinnis
- Staff: 67
- Gender: Co-educational
- Age: 11 to 16
- Enrolment: 1100
- Website: http://www.ormistonsandwell.org.uk

Ormiston Sandwell Community Academy (formerly Tividale Comprehensive School, Tividale High School and Tividale Community Arts College) is an academy for secondary aged pupils located in Tividale, Sandwell, in the West Midlands of England.

The school was built in 1956 as The Tividale School to serve the expanding Tividale area which by this date had expanded beyond Tipton's borders into Dudley. Since then it has undergone several changes of status and name alongside building expansion. On its opening, it was one of the first comprehensive schools in Britain.

From September 2009, the school became an academy sponsored by the Ormiston Academies Trust. The school was then renamed Ormiston Sandwell Community Academy. Today, the school mostly serves pupils living in the Oldbury, Tipton and Rowley Regis areas of Sandwell.

In 2013 the academy started a two-year build programme which saw over £10 million spent on a mixture of new build, remodelling and refurbishment as well as enhancing IT provision and student areas. In September 2017, further expansion of the school was completed at the cost of around £2.5 million.

As of May 2015, the school is rated as 'Good' by Ofsted, a big improvement on its showings before the academy was created, when the former comprehensive school was consistently among the lowest performing schools in the Sandwell area in terms of exam results and Ofsted inspections.

In March 2017, the school was designated as a National Support School by the Department of Education. The school will support other schools facing challenging circumstances. The former Executive Principal, Marie McMahon, was also designated as a National Leader of Education.
