= Anstey Town F.C. =

Association football club in England

Anstey Town
- Full name: Anstey Town Football Club
- Ground: Beaumont Park
- League: Midland League Division One
- 2025–26: Leicestershire Senior League Premier Division, 2nd of 16 (promoted)

Anstey Town Football Club is a football club based in Anstey, Leicestershire, England. They are currently members of the Midland League Division One.

== History ==
Anstey Town played in the Leicestershire Senior League at three different periods: 1897 to 1899, 1982 to 2009, and 2013 to 2026.

In 2026, the club was admitted into the Midland League Division One.

== Honours ==
Leicestershire Senior League

- Premier Division Champions: 2024–25
- Premier Division Runners up: 2025–26
- First Division Champions: 2004–05, 2005–06, 2006–07, 2023–24

== Records ==
Best FA Vase performance: First round: 2026–27
