= Winsford United F.C. =

Association football club in England

Winsford United
- Full name: Winsford United Football Club
- Nickname: The Blues
- Founded: 1883; 143 years ago (as Over Wanderers)
- Ground: The Barton Stadium, Winsford
- Capacity: 3,000 (103 seated)
- Chairman: Michael Unwin
- Manager: Dean Jones & Dom Johnson
- League: Midland League Premier Division
- 2025–26: Midland League Premier Division, 3rd of 18
- Website: winsfordunitedfootballclub.co.uk
Home colours	Away colours

Winsford United Football Club are a football club based in Winsford, Cheshire, England. The club was founded in 1883. They are nicknamed The Blues, and their home ground is Barton Stadium. Their all-time top scorer is Perry Plowman with 256 goals in all competitions.

== History ==
Winsford United were founded in 1883, as Over Wanderers, and played football in the Welsh Combination Football League. They changed their name and moved to their current ground, the Barton Stadium (then called the Bean Latham Playing Field), a few years later. However, after excessive spending, the club soon folded.

The club’s main rivalry is with Northwich Victoria, nicknamed the A533 derby, and is reputed to be one of the more significant non-league derbies in the county of Cheshire and the wider north west of England.

They re-formed just before the outbreak of the First World War, and re-grouped after this had finished under a committee led by R. G. Barton, becoming a founder member of the Cheshire League. From then until the late 1970s, Winsford United played football locally in Cheshire. Highlights of this period included one FA Cup first round appearance, against Peterborough United, and Cheshire league wins in 1920–21 and 1976–77. During this period, in the late 1970s, the club also reached the quarter-finals of the FA Trophy and featured future Welsh international goalkeeper Neville Southall.

The Cheshire League merged with other regional divisions to become the North West Counties Football League in 1982, with Winsford doing sufficiently well to enter the Northern Premier League Division One upon its formation in 1987. They were promoted from that in 1992, and enjoyed their highest ever finish as runners up of the Northern Premier League Premier Division in 1992–93. They also reached the FA Cup first round for a second time in November 1991, eventually losing to 5-2 (1–1 at HT) at Wrexham (Wrexham famously went on to beat premier league team Arsenal 2–1 in the 3rd round), and won the Northern Premier League Challenge Cup.

This successful team was broken up however, when manager Mike McKenzie moved on to local rivals Witton Albion. After a few more seasons in the bottom half of the Northern Premier League Premier Division and another local derby on November 15th 1997 in the FA Cup first round – this time against Chester City – the club were relegated three times in four seasons. At the start of the 2003–04 season, they found themselves in the North West Counties Division Two.

They were finally promoted, on 24 April 2007, to the North West Counties Football League Division One and secured the Division 2 title on 28 April 2007. Manager Joe Gibiliru left in the summer of 2009 and Terry Murphy, former Middlewich Town F.C. manager, was brought in as replacement. However, at the back end of August 2009 Murphy left the club due to family reasons and his assistant, Mike Alcock, was promoted to manager.

Alcock did not, however, last long as at the beginning of September 2009 he was forced to resign due to ill health and coach Tony Ledwards was promoted to manager. In March 2010, Ledwards stepped down as manager after a poor run of results and the club was taken over by a co-management team of Mike Alcock and Dave Twite, who effectively saved the team from relegation. At the end of the 2009–10 season, Alcock and Twite decided not to continue as managers and became involved in coaching and scouting roles instead.

Chris Willcock was announced as the new manager and later named Ian Street as his assistant, it was to be Willcock's second spell in charge of the club after leading them to promotion from North West Counties Division Two in 2007, Chris Willcock resigned as the Blues' manager in early 2011 and assistant Ian Street was appointed as the new manager.

Street was to remain in charge of the team in for the rest of the season. Under his management, Winsford won the North West Counties Football League Challenge Cup, defeating New Mills F.C. in the final.

Street managed the team for the whole of the 2011–12 season, guiding them to 7th place. However, in June 2012 it was announced Street had left the club to take over as manager of Ashton Athletic F.C. On 17 June, it was announced that Lloyd Morrison had joined the club as the new manager; he had been at Flixton F.C. for the past two seasons. Kevin Bircumshaw decided to stay on as assistant manager.

Winsford have boasted many local talents over the years such as Lee Duckworth, Joe Roberts, Les Miranda, Steve Warburton and Lee Jones

Winsford finished 5th in the North West Counties Premier Division in Morrison's first year in charge, just five points off league winners Padiham F.C. Despite missing out on promotion in 2012–13, the club did win the Mid-Cheshire Senior Cup for the fifth time in their history, beating Northwich Victoria F.C. 2–1 after extra time in the final.

Two weeks prior to the start of the 2013–14 season, Eddie Haslam was appointed as manager following Lloyd Morrison's departure for Mossley, but after a series of poor results in the autumn, he was replaced by Rob Byrne in December 2013. In 2015 the club introduced their new Under 21s side managed by Chris Appleton.

In October 2015 Lee Duckworth took over as first team manager after making over 300 appearances for the club, he led them to 8 mid table finishes in the North West Counties Division 1 (14th, 13th, 14th, 16th, 13th, 7th, 11th, 18th). In the summer of 2023 The FA decided Winsford Utd must move laterally to the Midlands Premier League. Duckworth stated the club could not run in this division and the club asked to be voluntarily relegated to the North West Counties Division 1 South. In March 2024 after a 4-0 defeat by Sandbach Utd Duckworth left the club by mutual consent with Winsford sitting 18th and five points from safety. Duckworth now manages local rivals Northwich Victoria, in the Midlands Premier League.

In May 2024 Dean Jones and Dom Johnson were announced as new co-managers of the club, in their first season they guided the club to 1st place in the North West Counties Division 1 South, only the 3rd promotion since the 82/83 season for the club. The 2025/26 season then saw the club compete in the Midlands Premier League finishing a respectable 3rd position, they were beaten in the play offs by local rivals 1874 Northwich. The season was also notable for the club's record run in the FA Vase, reaching the last 16.

== Stadium ==
The club play at the Barton Stadium, which is located off Kingsway in the Wharton area of Winsford town. The stadium formerly had a greyhound racing track. It was formerly known as the Great Western Playing Field, but was renamed in honour of R.G. Barton, who led the committee to re-establish Winsford United after the First World War. The stadium played host to 1874 Northwich F.C. and Northwich Victoria F.C. as tenants in the recent past.

== Current squad ==
Note: Flags indicate national team as defined under FIFA eligibility rules; some limited exceptions apply. Players may hold more than one non-FIFA nationality.

No.	Pos.	Nation	Player
--	GK	ENG	Ryan Brown (vc)
--	GK	ENG	Jacob Kirwan
--	DF	ENG	Ashton Brogan
--	DF	ENG	Henry Briscoe
--	DF	ENG	Steve Jenyons (c)
--	DF	ENG	Ewan McGeady
--	DF	ENG	Jacob Stretch
--	DF	ENG	Isaac Bush
--	DF	ENG	Joshua Hall
--	MF	ENG	Daniel Brown
--	MF	ENG	Louis Johnson
--	MF	ENG	Diego Esquivel-McGann
--	MF	ENG	Sean Tierney
--	MF	ENG	Lewis Corbett

No.	Pos.	Nation	Player
--	MF	ENG	Sam Latham
--	MF	ENG	Harry Johnson
--	MF	ENG	Sam Elliott
--	FW	ENG	Mykah Skervin
--	FW	ENG	Kaylan Wilkinson
--	FW	ENG	Danny Guiver
--	FW	ENG	Jordan Johnson
--	FW	ENG	Regan Hughes
--	FW	ENG	Adam O’Mara

== Management ==
- Co-managers:
  - Dean Jones/Dom Johnson
- First team coach(es):
  - Stephen May & James Page
- Player/coach:
  - Sean Tierney
- Physiotherapist:
  - Reece Stockton

Goalkeeper coach(es)

  - Sam Tours & David Unwin
- Club secretary & matchday secretary:
  - Mike Dawson & Jason Dudley
- Kit manager:
  - Ron Bogue

== Club records ==
- Best FA Cup performance: First round, 1975–76, 1991–92, 1997–98
- Best FA Trophy performance: Quarter-finals, 1977–78
- Best FA Vase performance: Fifth round, 2025–26

== Club honours ==
- Northern Premier League (Level 7)
- Runners-Up: 1992–93
  - Challenge Cup
    - Winner: 1992–93
  - President's Cup
    - Winner: 1992–93
- North West Counties Football League (Level 9)
  - Division One North (Level 10)
    - Winners: 2006–07
  - Division One South (Level 10)
    - Winners: 2024-25
  - Challenge Cup
    - Winners: 2010–11
- Cheshire League
  - Winners: 1920–21, 1976–77
  - Runners–up: 1974–75, 1979–80
- Cheshire Senior Cup
  - Winners: 1958–59, 1979–80, 1992–93
- Mid-Cheshire Senior Cup
  - Winners: 1991–92, 1992–93, 1994–95, 2007–08, 2012–13, 2013–14
