= New Parks =

Suburb of Leicester, England

Coordinates: 52.646°N 1.173°W

- Houses in New Parks

- Population: 17,128 (2011)
- Unitary authority: Leicester
- Ceremonial county: Leicestershire
- Region: East Midlands
- Country: England
- Sovereign state: United Kingdom
- Post town: LEICESTER
- Postcode district: LE3
- Dialling code: 0116
- Police: Leicestershire
- Fire: Leicestershire
- Ambulance: East Midlands
- UK Parliament: Leicester West

New Parks is a residential suburb of the city of Leicester, in the Leicester district, in the ceremonial county of Leicestershire, England. It was also an electoral ward of the City of Leicester whose population at the 2011 Census was 17,128.

It is in the west of the city. South of New Parks is the Western Park ward, north is the Beaumont Leys ward and to the east is the Fosse ward.

There are many shops neighbouring the homes and leisure centres. On 16 March 2010, the £1.5 million New Parks Centre Library, funded by the Big Lottery Fund and Leicester City Council, was opened by Councillor Andy Connelly and local residents Karen Berry and Sally Kibble.

Shops in New Parks, Leicester

New Parks Leisure Centre

There are a few primary schools; Braunstone Frith Primary School, Forest Lodge Academy, Inglehurst Primary School, Fosse Primary School, Parks Primary School and Stokes Wood Primary School. There is one secondary school, New College Leicester.

Former New Parks Councillors include George Billington, Ross Willmott, John Blackmore and Colin Hall.

The current Labour Councillors for the ward are Dawn Alfonso, Stephen Corrall and Malcolm Unsworth.

== Civil parish ==
New Parks was formerly an extra-parochial tract, from 1858 New Parks was a civil parish in its own right until it was abolished on 1 April 1935 and merged with Leicester, part also went to form Glenfields. In 1931 the parish had a population of 704.
