= Saffron Dynamo F.C. =

Association football club in England

Coordinates: 52.557431°N 1.1894122°W

Saffron Dynamo
- Full name: Saffron Dynamo Football Club
- Nickname: Saff
- Founded: 1963
- Ground: Kings Park, Cosby
- Capacity: 1000
- Chairman: Steve Crane
- Manager: Kelvin Granger
- League: Midland League Division One
- 2025–26: Midland League Division One, 19th of 21
- Website: https://www.saffrondynamofc.co.uk/
Home colours	Away colours

Saffron Dynamo Football Club is a football club based in Cosby, Leicestershire, England. They are currently members of the Midland League Division One and play at Cambridge Road.

== History ==
The club was founded in 1963 by a group of friends playing friendly matches on Saffron Lane Recreation Field (hence the name). One of the original men was Bob King who is still with the club to this day and is now the treasurer.

In 1976, the club moved to Cambridge Road where they initially rented a pitch from Wellington Vics. With the demise of the Vics in 1984, the ground was purchased by SDFC.

In 1994, SDFC joined the Leicestershire Senior League and over time had steadily built up its youth teams, now operating all the way from U5's to U18's.

In 2011, the club secured funding to build a new clubhouse. More recently a 7v7 state of the art 3G pitch has been installed and the first team secured promotion to the United Counties League having finished runners up in the Leicestershire Senior League in the 2018/19 season.

The club was moved laterally to the Midland Football League Division 1 for the 2024-25 season where they remain until present.

== Ladies Side ==
Saffron Dynamo Ladies first senior side was formed for the 2018-19 season entering into the Leicestershire Womens and Girls Foootball League. They have continued to compete in the league with multiple promotions and relegations between Division 1 and 2. Ahead of the 2026-27 season they were accepted into the 2026-27 Womens FA Cup, becoming the first senior side at the club to play in the FA Cup.

== Ground ==
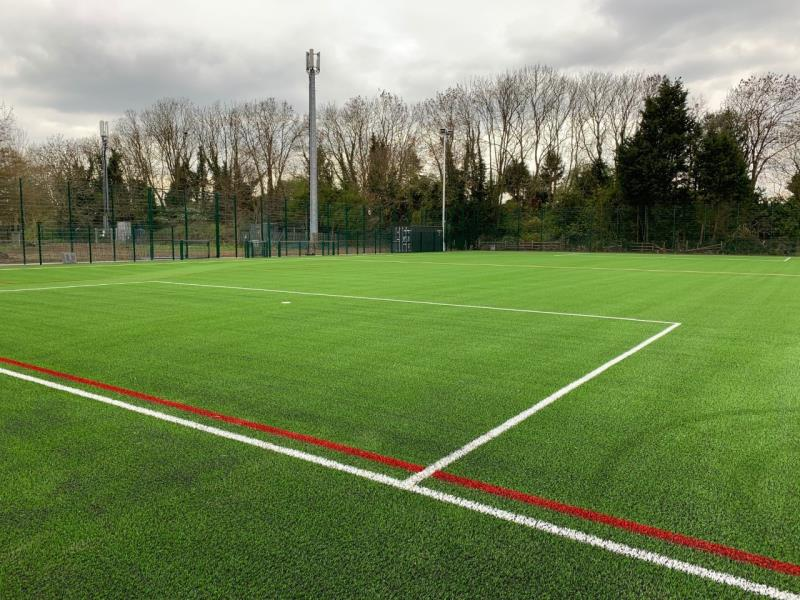
Saffron Dynamos 7v7 3G Shortly after construction

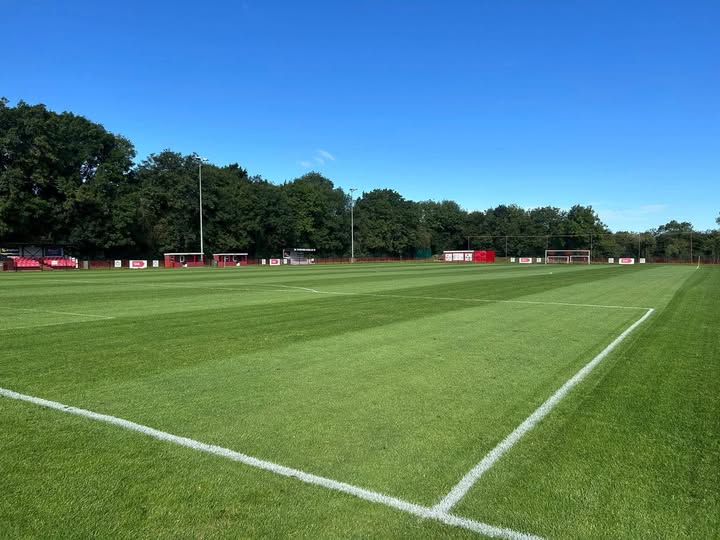
Saffron Dynamo 11v11 Main Pitch

Since 1976, the club play their home games at King's Park, Cambridge Road, Cosby. After eight years, the club purchased the ground. In 2011, the club opened their new clubhouse and changing facilities.On September 1st 2019 a 7v7 3G pitch was opened. And more recently: works to install pitch drainage, pitch side perimeter fencing and the tarmacking of the car park have been completed.

== Honours ==
- Leicestershire Senior League Beacon Bitter Trophy
  - Winners (2) 1999–00, 2006–07

== Management ==
Committee Members

- Paul Bent
- Hannah Butler
- Steve Cattermole
- Andi Commons
- Steve Crane
- Steve Hunt
- Bob King
- James Simmons
- Lisa Smith
- Martin Stanley
- John Towe

Behind the scenes

- President - JB James
- Chairman - Steve Crane
- Treasurer - Bob King
- Secretary - Steve Cattermole
- Welfare officer - Lisa Smith
- Bar manager - James Simmons
- Development Manager - Martin Stanley
- Gateman - William Simmons
- Social Media Manager - Daniel Simmons

Senior Section

- Senior Section Secretary - James Simmons
- 1st Team Manager - Kelvin Granger
- 1st Team Assistant Manager - Carlton Beardmore
- 1st Team Coach - Jake Woolley
- 1st Team Coach - Phillip Bilson
- 1st Team Physio - Charlotte Jefferies
- Reserves Manager - Lawrence Goode
- Reserves Assistant Manager - Brad Moore
- Women's Manager - Sid Faulkner
- Women's Manager - Jake Lindsay
- Women's Coach - Charlotte Jefferies
- Under 18s Manager - Tony Maisto

== Records ==
- Best FA Vase performance: Second round, 2018–19
- Attendance : 400 vs Birstall United 28/07/2023
- Best Womens FA Cup performance: Preliminary round, 2026-27
- Attendance (Women) : 250 vs Brookside Athletic 23/08/2026
