= Romulus F.C. =

Association football club in England

Romulus Football Club
- Full name: Romulus Football Club
- Nickname: The Roms
- Founded: 1979
- Ground: The Dominos Arena, Sutton Coldfield
- Capacity: 2,000 (300 seated)
- Coordinates: 52°33′24″N 1°49′07″W
- Owner: Richard Evans
- Chairman: Keith Higham
- Manager: Tyrell Belford
- League: Midland League Premier Division
- 2025–26: Midland League Premier Division, 13th of 18
- Website: https://www.romulusfc.com/
Home colours	Away colours

Romulus Football Club is a football club based in Sutton Coldfield, Birmingham, England and plays at the Dominos Arena. The club's first team plays in the Midland League Premier Division. The club was formed in 1979 by club president Roger Evans. Initially, the team played Sunday league football.

== History ==
Romulus Football Club was formed in 1979 by the current club president Roger Evans and Ken Powell. Initially, the team played Sunday league football. After a number of successful years, they stepped up to senior football in 1999, entering the Midland Football Combination. In 2003–04, they won this league and were promoted to the Midland Football Alliance. In 2006–07, they finished second in the Alliance and were promoted to the Southern League Division One Midlands, In 2010, the club was switched to the Northern Premier League Division One South. In 2018 after 11 seasons at step 4 level, the club was relegated and placed into the Midland League Premier Division. In the 2018–19 season, Romulus got to the final of the Midland League Cup, and won the trophy with a 2–1 victory over Burbage in the final at Bescot Stadium. In the 2025-26 season the team reached the Midland League Cup final again, only to be defeated on penalties by Sutton United.

== Ground ==
For many years, Romulus shared a ground with Sutton Coldfield Town at Coles Lane. At the start of the 2018–19 season, the club returned to their original base at Castle Vale Stadium in the Castle Vale area of Birmingham. The stadium features a 3G pitch and an air conditioned clubhouse. At the start of the 2023 season, Roms returned to Coles Lane now called the Domino Arena

Romulus also owns a training ground on Lindridge Road, Birmingham, where they have a full-time college academy for football players aged 16 to 19 years of age.

== Management and coaching staff ==
Position	Name
Manager	Tyrell Belford
Assistant Manager	Bek Halil
First Team Coach	Nathan Whitehead
Goalkeeper Coach	
Physio	Ruby
Kit Manager	Lee Willock

== Records ==
- Best league performance: Southern League Division One Midlands, 8th, 2009–10
- Best FA Cup performance: 2nd Qualifying Round, 2006–07, 2008–09, 2018–19
- Best FA Trophy performance: 2nd Qualifying Round, 2008–09
- Best FA Vase performance: 3rd Round, 2006–07

== See also ==
- Romulus F.C. players
