= Lutterworth Athletic F.C. =

Association football club in England

Coordinates: 52.480139°N 1.201088°W

Lutterworth Athletic
- Full name: Lutterworth Athletic Football Club
- Nickname: The Atho
- Founded: 1983
- Ground: Hall Park, Lutterworth
- Chairman: Mick English
- Manager: Dan Carter
- League: Midland League Division One
- 2024–25: Midland League Division One, 18th of 22
| Home colours | Away colours |

Lutterworth Athletic Football Club is a football club based in Lutterworth, Leicestershire, England. They are currently members of the Midland League Division One and play at Hall Park.

== History ==
The club was established in 1983 as a youth team under the name Lutterworth Juniors and Youth. In 1993 a senior team was formed when the oldest age group reached adult football age. They joined Division Two of the Leicester and District Football League, and won the division in their second season, earning promotion to Division One. A fourth-place finish in Division One in 1996–97 saw the club promoted to the Premier Division. However, they were relegated back to Division One after a single season in the Premier Division.

In 2000–01 Lutterworth were Division One runners-up and were promoted to the Premier Division. They were Premier Division champions in 2004–05, earning promotion to Division One of the Leicestershire Senior League. In 2008–09 the club finished second in Division One, resulting in promotion to the Premier Division. After finishing as runners-up in the Premier Division in 2011–12, they were promoted to the East Midlands Counties League. At the end of the 2012–13 season they were transferred to Division One of the United Counties League. They were later transferred to Division One of the Spartan South Midlands in 2021, and then back to Division One of the United Counties League the following year. At the end of the 2023–24 season they were moved to Division One of the Midland League.

== Ground ==
The club moved to Dunley Way in 2005, but were unable to use floodlights, despite installing them. In 2011 they moved to the floodlit Hall Park ground, displacing former tenants Lutterworth Town. Town later moved to Dunley Way.

== Honours ==
- Leicester & District League
  - Premier Division champions 2004–05
  - Division Two champions 1994–95
- Lutterworth Charity Cup
  - Winners 2008–09, 2009–10, 2010–11

== Records ==
- Best FA Vase performance: Second round, 2023–24
