= Sutton United F.C. (Birmingham) =

Coordinates: 52°33′40.2″N 1°48′51.33″W

Sutton United
- Full name: Sutton United Football Club
- Founded: 1947; 79 years ago
- Ground: Coleshill Road, Sutton Coldfield
- Chairman: Pete Lugg
- Manager: Neil Tooth
- League: Midland League Premier Division
- 2025–26: Midland League Division One, 3rd of 21 (promoted via play-offs)
Home colours

Sutton United Football Club is a football club based in Sutton Coldfield, England. They are currently members of the Midland League Premier Division and play at Coleshill Road, Sutton Coldfield.

== History ==
Sutton United was formed in 1947 by three men, Frank White, Ken Smith and Bill Walker, who had met whilst on service for the Royal Air Force. The club initially competed in the Birmingham and District League, winning the Premier Division on seven occasions. In 2012, Sutton United joined the Midland Combination Division Two, winning promotion to Division One in their first season in the league. In 2014, after the Midland Combination and the Midland Alliance merged, Sutton were placed into the Midland League. In 2017, the club dropped out of the Midland League, rejoining the Birmingham and District League, before making the step back up to the Midland League Division Three in 2019. In 2023, the club was admitted into the Midland League Division One.

== Ground ==
Upon formation, Sutton United played at Cows Lane, Wylde Green, before the club moved to Penns Lane, Sutton Coldfield and then to Rectory Park. In 1997, the club moved into Hollyfield Road, buying the site from Sutton Coldfield RFC. In 2016, Sutton United acquired their current facilities at Coleshill Road.

== Records ==
- Best FA Vase performance: Fourth round, 2024–25
- Best attendance: 1,700 vs Bourne Town FA Vase Fourth round 2024-25
