= Midland Football League =

Levels of English league football

- Founded: 2014
- Country: England
- Number of clubs: 71; 18 (Premier Division); 20 (Division One); 16 (Division Two); 17 (Division Three)
- Level on pyramid: Levels 9–11 (Premier Division; Division One; Division Two)
- Promotion to: Northern Premier League Division One West or Midlands
- Relegation to: Herefordshire County FA League Premier Division; Midland League Division Two; Shropshire County League; Staffordshire County Senior League; West Midlands (Regional) League
- Domestic cup(s): National; FA Cup; FA Vase; League; League Cup
- Current champions: Hanley Town (Premier Division); Knowle (Division One); Northfield Town (Division Two); Coventry Colliery (Division Three) (2025–26)
- Website: Official site
- Current: 2026–27 season

The Midland Football League is an English football league that was founded in 2014 by the merger of the former Midland Alliance and Midland Combination. The league has five divisions, the upper three of which sit at levels 9–11 of the football pyramid, and one league for Under 21 teams.

== History ==
The league was formed in 2014 following the merger of the Midland Alliance and Midland Combination.

Successful Premier Division clubs can win promotion to the 8th level of the English football league system, while the competition also has a number of feeder leagues at level 11, which provide new member clubs each year. Entry can also be gained by applying from non-pyramid leagues such as the Birmingham & District Football League.

Clubs are also liable to be transferred to other leagues if the FA deems it geographically suitable to do so.

== Current clubs (2026–27) ==
=== Premier Division ===
| Club | Location | Home ground |
|---|---|---|
| Abbey Hulton United | Stoke-on-Trent | Drayton Beaumont Park |
| AFC Wolverhampton City | Wolverhampton | Prestige Midland Arena |
| Brocton | Stafford | Silkmore Lane Sports Ground |
| Cheadle Town | Cheadle | The Ground Up Solutions Stadium |
| Darlaston Town | Walsall | The Paycare Stadium |
| Dudley Town | Willenhall | Guardian Warehouse Arena |
| Lye Town | Lye | Sports Ground |
| Northwich Victoria | Runcorn | Apec Taxis Stadium |
| Romulus | Sutton Coldfield | The Dominos Arena |
| Runcorn Town | Runcorn | Viridor Community Stadium |
| Sporting Khalsa | Willenhall | Guardian Warehouse Arena |
| Stockport Georgians | Stockport | Cromley Road |
| Stone Old Alleynians | Newcastle Under Lyme | GRG Stadium |
| Sutton United | Sutton Coldfield | Coleshill Road Stadium |
| Tividale | Tividale | The Beeches |
| Uttoxeter Town | Uttoxeter | Oldfield Sports & Social Club |
| West Didsbury & Chorlton | Manchester | StepPlaces Stadium |
| Whitchurch Alport | Whitchurch | Dourish & Day Stadium |
| Winsford United | Winsford | Winsford |
| Wythenshawe Town | Wythenshawe | Ericstan Park |

=== Division One ===
| Club | Location | Home ground |
|---|---|---|
| AFC North Kilworth | Lutterworth | The Power Flush UK Arena |
| Anstey Town | Leicester | DMU Beaumont Park |
| Birmingham OJM | Birmingham | Illey Lane |
| Birstall United | Birstall | Meadow Lane |
| Boldmere Rangers | Sutton Coldfield | Amber Arena |
| Bustleholme | Birmingham | BCFA Excellence Arena |
| Chelmsley Town | Chelmsley Wood | Pack Meadow |
| Coalville Town | Coalville | Voltage Solutions Stadium |
| Coventry Copsewood | Coventry | Allard Way |
| Cradley Town | Cradley | Beeches View |
| FCV Grace Dieu | Manor Park | FCV Academy |
| GNG Oadby Town | Leicester | Riverside Football Ground |
| Gornal Athletic | Lower Gornal | Garden Walk |
| Heather St John's | Heather | St John's Park |
| Holwell Sports | Melton Mowbray | Holwell Sports FC |
| Ingles | Shepshed | Dovecote Stadium |
| Kirby Muxloe | Kirby Muxloe | Kirby Muxloe Sports Village |
| Leicester St Andrews | Aylestone | Canal Street |
| Lutterworth Athletic | Lutterworth | Hall Park |
| Northfield Town | Birmingham | Shenley Lane Community Association |
| Saffron Dynamo | Cosby | Kings Park |
| Stapenhill | Stapenhill | Edge Hill |

=== Division Two ===
| Club | Location | Home ground |
|---|---|---|
| AFC Solihull | Solihull | Rumbush Lane |
| Birmingham United | Redditch | Trico Stadium |
| Bolehall Swifts | Tamworth | Rene Road Ground |
| Cadbury Athletic | Bournville | Cadbury Recreation Ground |
| Central Ajax | Warwick | Hampton Road |
| Coventrians | Coventry | Holbrooks Park |
| Coventry Alvis | Coventry | Alvis Sports & Social Club |
| Coventry Colliery | Coventry | Hawkes Mill Sports & Social Club |
| Earlswood Town | Earlswood | The Pavilions |
| Fairfield Villa | Fairfield | Fairfield Recreation Ground |
| Hampton | Solihull | Field Lane |
| Inkberrow | Inkberrow | Sands Road |
| Kenilworth Sporting | Kenilworth | Gypsy Lane |
| Nuneaton Griff | Nuneaton | The Pingles Stadium |
| Paget Rangers | Birmingham | Vale Stadium |
| Wake Green Amateurs | Solihull | The Holloway |

=== Division Three ===
| Club | Location | Home ground |
|---|---|---|
| AFC Balsall | Coventry | Massey Ferguson Sports Ground |
| AFC Birmingham | Halesowen | AFC Birmingham Stadium |
| Arden Forest | Kingshurst | Tudor Grange Academy |
| Birmingham Tigers | Smethwick | Hadley Stadium |
| BNJS | Smethwick | Hadley Stadium |
| Continental Star | Perry Barr | The Hub |
| Coventry Dunlop Community | Coventry | Dunlop Sports And Social |
| Diamonds Academy | Birmingham | Hollyfields |
| Gornal | Brierley Hill | Wombourne Leisure Centre |
| Lane Head | Walsall | Somerfield Road |
| Leafield Athletic | Solihull | Rumbush Lane |
| Leamington Hibernian | Catherine De Barnes | The Boggery |
| Mercia Athletic | Coventry | The Place |
| Silhill | Solihull | Sharmans Cross Road |
| Solihull Youth Academy | Solihull | Sharmans Cross Road |
| Walsall Wood | Walsall Wood | The John Sylvester Stadium |

=== Under 21 Division ===
| Club | Location | Home ground |
|---|---|---|
| Arden Forest U21 | Chelmsley Wood | Grace Academy |
| Ashby Ivanhoe U21 | Ashby | Element Ground |
| Bartley Reds U21 | Quinton | Four Dwellings |
| Birmingham OJM U21 | Stourport on Severn | Stourport High School |
| Brocton U21 | Stafford | Silkmore Lane Sports Ground |
| Bromsgrove Sporting U21 | Bromsgrove | UK Electrical Stadium |
| Cadbury Athletic U21 | Birmingham | Cadbury Recreation Ground |
| Coalville Town U21 | Coalville | Newbridge School |
| Coventry Copsewood U21 | Coventry | Copsewood Sports & Social Club |
| Coventry United U21 | Coventry | Nick Newbold Stadium |
| Mercia Athletic U21 | Birmingham | The Pavillion |
| Pelsall Villa Colts U21 | Wolverhampton | Long Lane Park |
| Redditch United U21 | Redditch | Valley Stadium |
| Rushall Olympic U21 | Walsall | Dales Lane |
| Sporting Khalsa U21 | Willenhall | The Guardian Warehousing Arena |
| Stafford Rangers U21 | Stafford | The Stan Robinson Stadium |
| Stourbridge U21 | Dudley | Dudley College |
| Sutton United U21 | Sutton Coldfield | Coleshill Road Stadium |
| Tamworth U21 | Tamworth | The Lamb Ground |
| Tividale U21 | Tividale | The Beeches |

== Honours ==
=== Champions ===
| Season | Premier Division | Division One | Division Two | Division Three |
|---|---|---|---|---|
| 2014–15 | Basford United | Highgate United | Coventry United | Austrey Rangers |
| 2015–16 | Hereford | Coventry United | Alvis Sporting Club | Leamington Hibernian |
| 2016–17 | Alvechurch | Bromsgrove Sporting | Paget Rangers | NKF Burbage |
| 2017–18 | Bromsgrove Sporting | Walsall Wood | NKF Burbage | GNP Sports |
| 2018–19 | Ilkeston Town | Heather St Johns | Northfield Town | Alcester Town |
| 2019–20 | No champions; season abandoned (COVID-19 pandemic) | | | |
| 2020–21 | No champions; season curtailed (COVID-19 lockdowns) | | | |
| 2021–22 | Hanley Town | Atherstone Town | Cadbury Athletic | AFC Coventry Rangers |
| 2022–23 | Walsall Wood | Dudley Town | Sutton United | Coventrians |
| 2023–24 | Congleton Town | Hinckley | Redditch Borough | AFC Solihull |
| 2024–25 | Lichfield City | Nuneaton Town | Northfield Town | Boldmere Sports & Social Falcons |
| 2025–26 | Hanley Town | TBC | TBC | TBC |

==== Promoted ====
| Season | Club | Position | Promoted to |
|---|---|---|---|
| 2014–15 | Basford United | 1st | Northern Premier League Division One South |
| 2015–16 | Hereford | 1st | Southern League Division One South & West |
| 2016–17 | Alvechurch | 1st | Northern Premier League Division One South |
| 2017–18 | Bromsgrove Sporting | 1st | Southern League East Division |
| 2017–18 | Coleshill Town | 2nd | Southern League East Division |
| 2018–19 | Ilkeston Town | 1st | Northern Premier League Division One South East |
| 2019–20 | None promoted | | |
| 2020–21 | Sporting Khalsa | 1st | Northern Premier League Division One Midlands |
| 2021–22 | Hanley Town | 1st | Northern Premier League Division One West |
| 2021–22 | Boldmere St Michaels | 2nd | Northern Premier League Division One Midlands |
| 2022–23 | Walsall Wood | 1st | Northern Premier League Division One Midlands |
| 2022–23 | Lye Town | 2nd | Northern Premier League Division One Midlands |
| 2023–24 | Congleton Town | 1st | Northern Premier League Division One Midlands |
| 2023–24 | Darlaston Town (1874) | 3rd | Northern Premier League Division One Midlands |
| 2024–25 | Lichfield City | 1st | Northern Premier League Division One Midlands |
| 2024–25 | Shifnal Town | 2nd | Northern Premier League Division One West |

== League Cup ==
=== Finals ===
| Season | | Result | | Venue | Attendance |
|---|---|---|---|---|---|
| 2014–15 | Long Eaton United | 2–0 | Rocester | Bescot Stadium | 227 |
| 2015–16 | Hereford | 3–1 | Walsall Wood | Damson Park | 849 |
| 2016–17 | Alvechurch | 2–1 | Hinckley AFC | Bescot Stadium | 628 |
| 2017–18 | Walsall Wood | 2–1 | Coleshill Town | Bescot Stadium | n/a |
| 2018–19 | Romulus | 2–1 | NKF Burbage | Bescot Stadium | 349 |
| 2019–20 | Final not contested | | | | |
| 2020–21 | Cancelled | | | | |
| 2021–22 | Not held | | | | |
| 2022–23 | Hinckley | 2–0 | Whitchurch Alport | Bescot Stadium | 700 |
| 2023–24 | Congleton Town | 5–1 | Highgate United | Bescot Stadium | 516 |
| 2024–25 | AFC Wulfrunians | 3–1 | Stapenhill | Dales Lane | 366 |
