= Ingles F.C. =

Association football club in England

Coordinates: 52.755826°N 1.368401°W

Ingles
- Full name: Ingles Football Club
- Founded: 1972
- Ground: Homestead Road, Thringstone
- Capacity: 2,050 (570 seated)
- Chairman: Adam Smith
- Manager: Adam Boulter
- League: Midland League Division One
- 2024–25: Midland League Division One, 8th of 22
Home colours

Ingles Football Club is a football club based in Thringstone, Leicestershire, England. They are currently members of the Midland League Division One and play at Thringstone Miners Social Centre.

== History ==
The club was established in 1972, and joined Division One of the North Leicestershire League. After finishing ninth in their first season, they were relegated to Division Three. The club were Division Three champions in 1973–74 and went on to win the Division Two title the following season. In 1975–76 they were runners-up in Division One (Princes), earning a third successive promotion to move up to the Premier Division. In 1977–78 the club won the league's Cobbin Trophy, and in 1980–81 they were runners-up in the Premier Division. The following season saw them win the Cobbin Trophy for the second time.

A successful period in the 1990s saw Ingles win the Premier Division title in 1992–93 and 1995–96 and the Cobbin Trophy in 1993–94, 1994–95 and 1997–98. They were also runners-up in the league in 1994–95, 1996–97 and 1998–99. In 2003–04 the club finished bottom of the Premier Division and were relegated to Division One. However, after finishing as runners-up in Division One the following season, they were promoted back to the Premier Division. During another period of success in the late 2000s the club won the Premier Cup in 2006–07 and 2008–09. After winning the Premier Division for a third time in 2013–14 the club moved up to Division One of the Leicestershire Senior League.

Ingles' first season in Division One ended with a third-placed finish, resulting in promotion to the Premier Division. In 2017–18 they won the Premier Division title on goal difference, earning promotion to the East Midlands Counties League. At the end of the 2020–21 season the East Midlands Counties League was dissolved and the club were transferred to Division One of the United Counties League. They were transferred again after only one season in the United Counties League, moving to Division One of the Midland League.

In 2023–24 Ingles finished fourth in Division One, qualifying for the promotion play-offs. They subsequently lost 2–0 to OJM in the semi-finals.

== Ground ==
The club were originally based on the Ingles playing fields. They subsequently moved to Little Haw Lane until the first team were promoted to the Premier Division of the Leicestershire Senior League in 2015, after which they began groundsharing at Shepshed Dynamo's Dovecote Stadium. Before the 2022–23 season they relocated to the Thringstone Miners Social Centre on Homestead Road in Thringstone.

== Honours ==
- Leicestershire Senior League
  - Premier Division champions 2017–18
- North Leicestershire Football League
  - Premier Division champions 1992–93, 1995–96, 2013–14
  - Division Two champions 1974–75
  - Division Three champions 1973–74
  - Cobbin Trophy winners 1977–78, 1981–82, 1993–94, 1994–95, 1997–98
  - Premier Cup winners 2006–07, 2008–09

== Records ==
- Best FA Vase performance: First round, 2023–24
