= Tudor Grange Academy, Kingshurst =

Coordinates: 52.4862°N 1.7487°W

Location
- Cooks Lane; Kingshurst; Birmingham, B37 6NU; England

Information
- Type: Academy
- Local authority: Solihull
- Trust: Tudor Grange Academies Trust
- Department for Education URN: 146379 Tables
- Ofsted: Reports
- Executive Principal: Darren Turner
- Gender: Coeducational
- Age: 11 to 18
- Enrolment: 1,322
- Website: https://www.kingshurst.tgacademy.org.uk/

Tudor Grange Academy, Kingshurst (previously CTC Kingshurst Academy) is a coeducational secondary school and sixth form located in Kingshurst, Solihull, England. It was the only City Technology College to offer post-16 students the opportunity to study the International Baccalaureate instead of A-levels. It also offers the options of studying for GNVQs and BTECs in various subjects.

== History ==
Under the name of "The City Technology College, Kingshurst", the establishment opened in 1988 as Britain's first CTC. Mrs Valerie Bragg was the Principal Emeritus. It was the first City Technology College and specialist school in England. The academy has developed a partnership in education, bringing together the world of industry, commerce and education and has very good results. From an all ability intake, 64% of Year 11 students achieved 5 or more GCSEs at grades A* to C or equivalent (including Maths and English) (2013).

The academy now accommodates over 1,600 students of all abilities from 11 to 19 years of age. The College is situated on the eastern outskirts of Birmingham in the suburb of Kingshurst, North Solihull. The College serves the East Birmingham and North Solihull areas.

When the College opened, 83% of students in the area were leaving school at 16 with few prospects of employment. As of 2006, more than 80% of the school's children continue with education to post-16, either at Kingshurst or at other colleges.

In 2008 the City Technology College, Kingshurst converted to Academy status, with the name changing to The City Technology College Kingshurst Academy. In 2010 refurbishments took place across the whole site and a new D block was built. D block was opened in October 2011. Technically, CTC Kingshurst Academy is registered as a company limited by guarantee while also being registered as a charity (Registered in England No: 2268092. Registered Charity number 700390).

3E's, a spinout company fully owned by the Kingshurst CTC Trust, was responsible for the formation of the Kingshurst Foundation – a confederation of schools run by the 3E's company. The initial schools in this Federation were King's College, Guildford and Kings International College, Camberley.

In 2018, after an Ofsted inspection and section 5 inspection that rated the Academy as 'Inadequate' in every category, CTC Kingshurst Academy joined Tudor Grange Academies Trust, a MAT (Multi-Academy Trust) that consists of 8 schools, offering either Primary or Secondary education. The trust was formed by its founding school, Tudor Grange Academy, Solihull. Having joined the trust, CTC Kingshurst Academy was renamed and is now known as Tudor Grange Academy, Kingshurst.

== Post 16 Education ==
Tudor Grange Academy, Kingshurst offers Post 16 Education for both internal and external candidates who have completed their Secondary Education. Tudor Grange Academy, Kingshurst offers Vocational Courses (BTECs and National Diplomas) as well as the International Baccalaureate Diploma.

== Facilities ==
The school has facilities available for use by the school and the surrounding community via advance booking. These facilities include:

- A flood-lit 3G Pitch
- 5 Grass Pitches
- 2 Tennis Courts
- A Sports Hall
- A Gymnasium
- A Dance Studio
- A Drama Studio
- An Outdoor Learning Centre, including a WW1 Replica Trench, Replica Saxon Village, A Low Ropes Course, A Pond and More.

== Notable alumni ==
- Jamelia – R&B
- Emalkay – Dubstep producer and DJ
- Kia Pegg – Actress
- Pete Dunne – professional wrestler
- Laura Rollins – Actress (Doctors)
- Lauren Oakley – Dancer (Strictly Come Dancing)
