= Barton Stadium (Winsford) =

Stadium in Winsford, England

- Interactive map of Barton Stadium
- Location: Wharton Road, Kingsway, Winsford, Cheshire CW7 3AE
- Coordinates: 53°11′32″N 2°30′44″W

Construction
- Opened: 1883

Barton Stadium is an Association football stadium on Wharton Road/ Kingsway, Winsford, Cheshire and is the home to Winsford United F.C. It is also a former greyhound racing venue.

== Opening ==
It was originally a basic football ground known as the Great Western Playing Field and located on the south side of Wharton Road and was used by an amateur football team called the Over Wanderers. The ground was developed into a football stadium after World War I.

== Football ==
The Wanderers changed their name to Winsford and later Winsford United who began life in 1913. The stadium name derived from the investment from the club's owner Mr R G Barton. The ground was stripped of its assets during World War II. The stadium remained the home of Winsford United F.C. throughout and 1874 Northwich F.C. (formed in 2012) who played at the ground in a ground sharing arrangement from 2013 until 2018.

== Greyhound racing ==
During 1970 the football club agreed to a grass greyhound racing circuit being constructed around the pitch. The racing was independent (not affiliated to the sport's governing body the National Greyhound Racing Club) and was known as a flapping track, which was the nickname given to independent tracks. The first meeting was on the 18 June 1970 and a greyhound called Carousel won the first race. Later a totalisator system was installed, along with tote booths and track lighting. In April 1985 Frank and Doreen Roberts took over the lease from Wally Jerome. The racing ended in January 1998.
