= A.F.C. Wolverhampton City =

Association football club in England

Coordinates: 52°34′31.184″N 2°11′21.228″W

AFC Wolverhampton City
- Full name: AFC Wolverhampton City
- Founded: 1922
- Ground: Castlecroft Stadium, Wolverhampton
- Manager: Vacant
- League: Midland League Premier Division
- 2025–26: Midland League Premier Division, 5th of 18
Home colours	Away colours

A.F.C. Wolverhampton City is a football club based in Wolverhampton, England. They are currently members of the Midland League Premier Division and play at the Castlecroft Stadium.

== History ==
Old Wulfrunians Football Club was established in 1922. They joined the Birmingham Amateur Football Alliance league system. They were Premier Division champions in 1932–33 and again in 1953–54, 1979–80 and 1991–92. After winning the Premier Division title and Senior Cup double for three successive seasons between 2002–03 and 2004–05, the club formed a new team under the name A.F.C. Wulfrunians in order to enter senior football, joining Division Two of the West Midlands (Regional) League, although the club continued playing in the Birmingham AFA under the Old Wulfrunians name.

In their first season, A.F.C. Wulfrunians won the Division Two title, earning promotion to Division One. They were Division One runners-up the following season, resulting in promotion to the Premier Division. After winning the Birmingham Midweek Floodlit Cup in 2007–08, the 2008–09 season saw the club win the Premier Division title. However, they were denied promotion to the Midland Alliance as their ground did not meet the necessary criteria. Following a move to the Castlecroft Stadium, the club won the Premier Division again in 2012–13 after winning their final match of the season at Malvern Town 2–0, and were promoted to the Midland Alliance.

In 2014 the Midland Alliance merged with the Midland Combination to form the Midland League, with A.F.C. Wulfrunians placed in the Premier Division. In 2024–25 they won the League Cup, beating Stapenhill 3–1 in the final. In the summer of 2025 the club was renamed AFC Wolverhampton City.

=== Other teams ===
After winning back-to-back Birmingham AFA Premier Division titles in 2013–14 and 2014–15, the club entered another team into Division Two of the West Midlands (Regional) League under the name Old Wulfrunians. They were Division Two runners-up in their first season, earning promotion to Division One.

== Ground ==
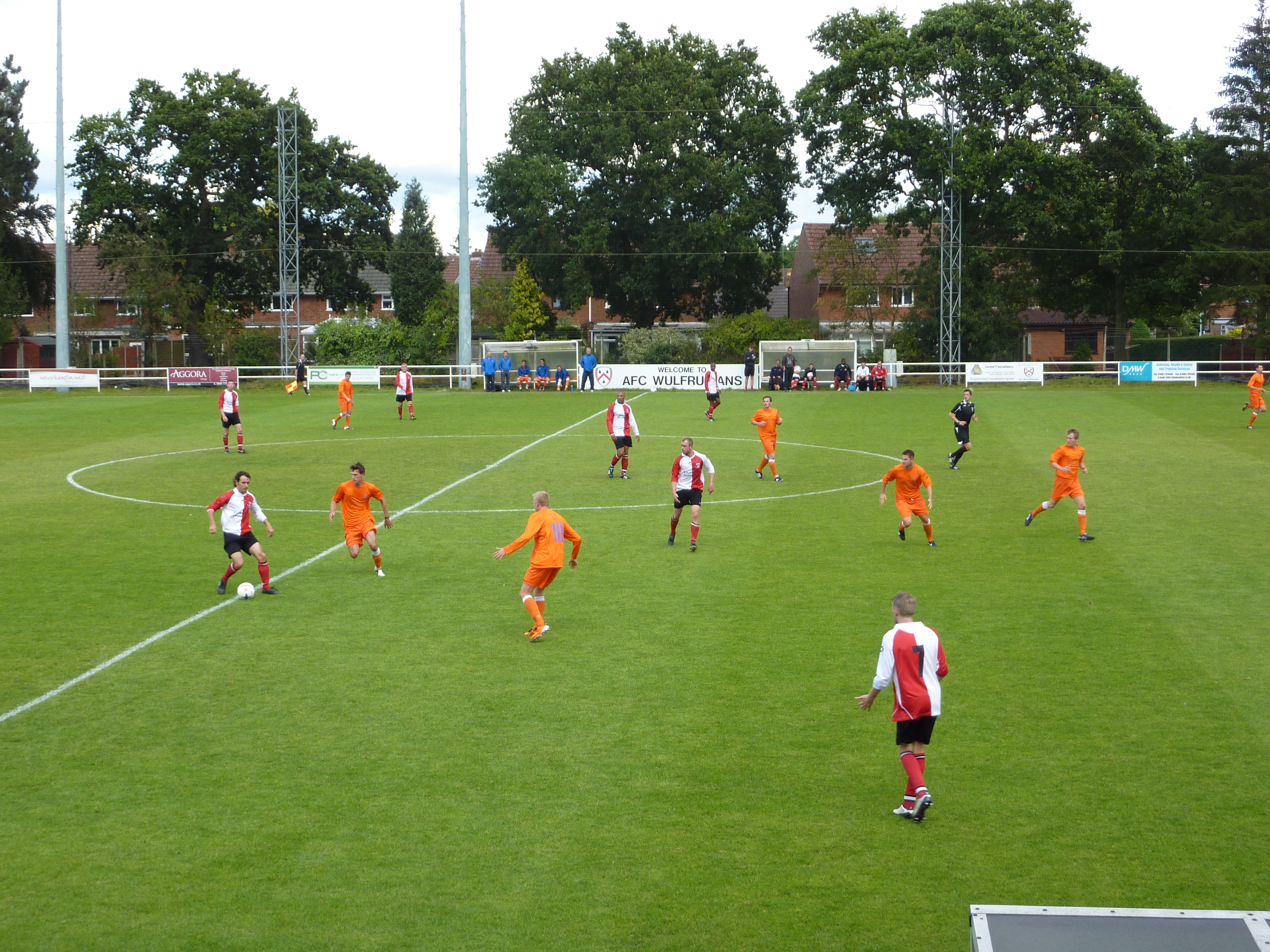
AFC Wulfrunians vs Wellington (August 2011)

Old Wulfrunians played at the Memorial Ground. However, the ground did not meet the grading required to play in the West Midlands (Regional) League, resulting in A.F.C. Wulfrunians playing at Wolverhampton Casuals' Brinsford Lane ground. After being denied promotion to the Midland Alliance at the end of the 2008–09 season, the club moved to the Castlecroft Stadium in the Castlecroft area at the start of the 2009–10 season, buying the lease from the Rugby Football Union. The stadium was originally built in the 1950s by Wolverhampton Wanderers as a training ground. In the 1990s it was bought by the RFU to be used as a schools and referees training centre / regional headquarters. AFC Wulfrunians are now leaseholders of the ground after buying the lease from the RFU. Old Wulfrunians play their West Midlands (Regional) League matches at the Memorial Ground after it was upgraded to meet the league's requirements.

Wolverhampton Wanderers Women began playing home games at Castlecroft Stadium in the 2012–13 season.

== Honours ==
- Midland League
  - League Cup winners 2024–25
- West Midlands (Regional) League
  - Premier Division champions 2008–09, 2012–13
  - Division Two champions 2005–06
- Birmingham AFA
  - Premier Division champions 1932–33, 1953–54, 1979–80, 1991–92, 2002–03, 2003–04, 2004–05
  - Senior Cup winners 1952–53, 1953–54, 1961–62, 1968–69, 1999–2000, 2002–03 2003–04, 2004–05
- JW Hunt Cup
  - Winners 1991–92, 2002–03, 2010–11
- Birmingham FA Vase
  - Winners 2006–07
- Birmingham Midweek Floodlit Cup
  - Winners 2007–08

== Records ==
- Best FA Cup performance: Second qualifying round, 2009–10, 2013–14
- Best FA Vase performance: Fourth round, 2015–16

== See also ==
- Category:A.F.C. Wolverhampton City players
- Category:A.F.C. Wolverhampton City managers
