= 2019–20 Midland Football League =

The 2019–20 Midland Football League season was the 6th in the history of the Midland Football League, a football competition in England. The allocations for Steps 1 to 6 for season 2019–20 were announced by the FA on 19 May. These were subject to appeal, and the Midland Football League's constitution was subject to ratification at the league's AGM on 8 June.

As a result of the COVID-19 pandemic, this season's competition was formally abandoned on 26 March 2020, with all results from the season being expunged, and no promotion or relegation taking place to, from, or within the competition. On 30 March 2020, sixty-six non-league clubs sent an open letter to the Football Association requesting that they reconsider their decision.

== Premier Division ==
Midland Football League Premier Division
- Season: 2019–20
- Matches: 270
- Goals: 906 (3.36 per match)

The Premier Division featured 13 clubs which competed in the previous season, along with seven new clubs:

- Gresley, relegated from the Northern Premier League
- Haughmond, promoted from the West Midlands (Regional) League
- Heather St John's, promoted from Division One
- Newark Flowserve, promoted from the East Midlands Counties League
- Racing Club Warwick, promoted from Division One
- Selston, promoted from the East Midlands Counties League
- Tividale, promoted from the West Midlands (Regional) League

=== League table ===
Pos	Team	Pld	W	D	L	GF	GA	GD	Pts	Promotion or relegation
1	Coventry United	29	19	5	5	60	31	+29	62	
2	Sporting Khalsa	26	18	1	7	66	27	+39	55	
3	Romulus	29	17	4	8	65	38	+27	55	
4	Newark Flowserve	30	17	3	10	60	42	+18	54	
5	Heather St John's	26	15	5	6	49	27	+22	50	
6	Walsall Wood	24	14	4	6	47	30	+17	46	
7	Boldmere St Michaels	29	13	6	10	50	44	+6	45	
8	Stourport Swifts	29	12	8	9	42	39	+3	44	
9	Long Eaton United	26	11	5	10	59	50	+9	38	
10	Highgate United	29	12	5	12	45	48	−3	38 (Note: Highgate United were given a three-point deduction for fielding an ineligible player)	
11	South Normanton Athletic	26	10	7	9	40	40	0	37	Resigned to the Central Midlands League
12	Worcester City	26	10	6	10	52	41	+11	36	
13	AFC Wulfrunians	31	10	6	15	50	57	−7	36	
14	Coventry Sphinx	25	9	7	9	38	57	−19	34	
15	Tividale	23	7	6	10	29	32	−3	27	
16	Haughmond	29	7	5	17	40	69	−29	26	
17	Racing Club Warwick	24	6	6	12	25	54	−29	24	
18	Lye Town	28	5	3	20	31	62	−31	18	
19	Gresley	26	3	7	16	29	51	−22	16	
20	Selston	25	2	7	16	29	67	−38	13	

Updated to match(es) played on 14 March 2020. Source: FA Full-Time
Rules for classification: 1) Points; 2) Goal difference; 3) Number of goals scored; 4) Number of matches won; 5) Head-to-head results

=== Results ===
Home \ Away	BSM	CVS	CVU	GRE	HAU	HEA	HIG	LEU	LYE	NEW	RCW	ROM	SEL	SKH	SOU	STO	TIV	WAL	WRC	WUL
Boldmere St Michaels	—		1–1	1–1		1–2	3–0	2–1		1–4	3–0	1–1	3–0	0–1	3–1	2–1		1–2	3–2	1–2
Coventry Sphinx		—				1–2				2–3	2–0		1–1		0–0	1–1	2–0	0–8	3–2	
Coventry United			—	4–3	0–2	1–0	3–0	3–1	6–0	4–1	1–1		6–0		2–1		1–0	1–3	2–0	4–3
Gresley		3–3	0–0	—	0–1	1–1	1–3		1–3	0–1	1–1	1–2		1–4	1–2		1–3	3–0		
Haughmond	2–4		2–4	2–0	—	1–4			2–2			2–1	3–1	2–5	3–2	0–1	2–1			2–2
Heather St John's	1–2	1–2		2–1	1–1	—	0–1	4–1		2–1	4–0	2–1		1–1	1–1	1–0		2–2	2–0	0–1
Highgate United	2–2	3–2	2–3		2–1	0–2	—			1–2		2–1	2–0	2–0	1–1		3–1	0–1	2–2	2–1
Long Eaton United	3–3	6–2	2–1		5–0	1–5	1–2	—	2–1	2–2	2–2		1–1			2–3	3–0	1–2	4–0	
Lye Town	2–3	1–2		0–1		2–3	2–1	0–1	—	1–2	1–0			2–0			0–5	0–1		0–1
Newark Flowserve		8–1	0–0	1–0	2–0			1–3	3–2	—	5–0	0–2	3–2	4–1	0–1	0–0			4–3	2–1
Racing Club Warwick	5–1	3–1	0–1	2–2	1–0			3–2	3–2		—			0–2						0–0
Romulus	1–2			2–0	3–1			1–3	2–0		6–0	—	3–2	3–1	2–4	3–0	3–0	3–0	2–2	6–2
Selston		1–3	0–1		2–2		3–2		3–2	0–3		1–3	—			3–3	1–1		1–4	
Sporting Khalsa	2–0	5–0	2–0		7–0			3–1			3–0	2–3	7–0	—	3–1	2–1		3–0	4–0	3–1
South Normanton Athletic							3–1	0–2	4–1		1–1			3–1	—	3–1	3–1		1–1	
Stourport Swifts	0–0	4–1	3–1	2–0		3–2	2–0			2–0	1–0	2–1	3–2		1–1	—		1–2		
Tividale		0–0	1–1		2–2		3–1		2–1			1–1	2–1		1–1	1–2	—		0–1	2–0
Walsall Wood	0–2		1–2	4–2	3–2		1–1		3–3						5–0	3–0	2–1	—		0–0
Worcester City	3–0		0–1		3–1	0–1	2–2	1–3	6–0	3–2	9–0	3–0			1–0	0–0			—	2–2
AFC Wulfrunians	2–1	0–1		2–3	1–0	1–3	3–1		2–0	1–3	1–2				1–2	2–2		2–0		—

Updated to match(es) played on unknown. Source:
Legend: Blue = home team win; Yellow = draw; Red = away team win.

=== Stadia and locations ===
Location of the clubs in the 2019–20 Midland League Premier Division

Club	Stadium	Capacity
AFC Wulfrunians	Castlecroft Stadium	2,000
Boldmere St. Michaels	Trevor Brown Memorial Ground	2,500
Coventry Sphinx	Sphinx Drive	1,000
Coventry United	Butts Park Arena	3,000
Gresley	Moat Ground	2,400
Haughmond	Shrewsbury Sport Village	
Heather St John's	St. John's Park	
Highgate United	The Coppice	2,000
Long Eaton United	Grange Park	3,000
Lye Town	The Sports Ground	1,000
Newark Flowserve	Hawton Lane	
Racing Club Warwick	Townsend Meadow	1,280
Romulus	The Central Ground	2,000
Selston	Mansfield Road	
South Normanton Athletic	Lees Lane	3,000
Sporting Khalsa	Aspray Arena	2,500
Stourport Swifts	Walshes Meadow	2,000
Tividale	The Beeches	2,800
Walsall Wood	Oak Park	1,000
Worcester City	Victoria Ground	3,500

== Division One ==
Midland Football League Division One
- Season: 2019–20
- Matches: 277
- Goals: 1,022 (3.69 per match)

Division One featured 16 clubs which competed in the previous season, along with four new clubs:

- Ashby Ivanhoe, transferred from East Midlands Counties League
- GNP Sports, promoted from Division Two
- Kirby Muxloe, relegated from the United Counties League
- Stafford Town, promoted from the Staffordshire County Senior League

=== League table ===
Pos	Team	Pld	W	D	L	GF	GA	GD	Pts	Promotion or relegation
1	Leicester Road	32	25	4	3	96	23	+73	79	
2	Brocton	31	21	2	8	91	43	+48	65	
3	Studley	27	18	5	4	62	23	+39	59	
4	Uttoxeter Town	27	19	1	7	65	35	+30	58	
5	Lichfield City	29	17	3	9	64	39	+25	54	
6	Atherstone Town	23	15	3	5	71	26	+45	48	
7	Kirby Muxloe	28	12	4	12	51	53	−2	40	
8	Hinckley	25	11	5	9	46	38	+8	38	
9	Rocester	28	10	6	12	43	54	−11	36	
10	Stapenhill	26	10	5	11	50	40	+10	35	
11	GNP Sports	24	11	2	11	39	45	−6	35	
12	NKF Burbage	28	11	2	15	46	55	−9	35	Club folded
13	Ashby Ivanhoe	23	11	1	11	33	43	−10	34	
14	Heath Hayes	28	10	3	15	48	58	−10	33	
15	Coventry Copsewood	29	9	2	18	40	67	−27	29	
16	Cadbury Athletic	27	8	3	16	43	56	−13	27	
17	Paget Rangers	28	7	5	16	43	73	−30	26	
18	Nuneaton Griff	31	7	5	19	35	85	−50	26	
19	Chelmsley Town	30	7	3	20	28	78	−50	24	
20	Stafford Town	30	4	4	22	28	88	−60	16	

Updated to match(es) played on 14 March 2020. Source: FA Full-Time
Rules for classification: 1) Points; 2) Goal difference; 3) Number of goals scored; 4) Number of matches won; 5) Head-to-head results

=== Results ===
Home \ Away	ASH	ATH	BRO	CAD	CHE	CVC	GNP	HEH	HIN	KIR	LEI	LIC	NKF	NUN	PAG	ROC	STF	STH	STU	UTX
Ashby Ivanhoe	—			2–0								4–1				2–0			0–1	
Atherstone Town		—					1–2			3–0					7–1	5–0				2–5
Brocton			—		7–1	2–1					2–1			14–0	2–1		5–1			
Cadbury Athletic		3–3	0–1	—	3–0	4–0			2–2					4–2						0–3
Chelmsley Town	1–1	0–2			—				0–5			2–1					3–0			
Coventry Copsewood	3–2					—							3–2					1–3		
GNP Sports			1–3	3–1			—			4–1					5–1					
Heath Hayes								—												
Hinckley	3–0		2–1			2–0			—	5–3			0–3		2–0			1–3		
Kirby Muxloe	1–2			5–2	3–1					—						5–0	3–1	3–1		
Leicester Road		4–1		5–0	5–0						—		2–2				1–0		4–0	
Lichfield City							3–1			4–0	2–0	—					3–2	4–3		
NKF Burbage	1–2			2–1								3–4	—							1–2
Nuneaton Griff		1–6			3–0	1–2						0–6	1–2	—				0–4		
Paget Rangers	5–1						2–3				0–6		6–2	5–0	—	0–4				
Rocester			4–5			1–1	0–3		3–1	2–2						—				
Stafford Town	0–4					5–0	1–2		2–1				2–2				—			0–3
Stapenhill				3–1	4–0						0–4		2–3		4–0			—	0–2	
Studley		1–1					3–1		1–1			1–3		5–2		2–0			—	
Uttoxeter Town			3–0		2–0	1–3							0–2	4–2	2–1				2–1	—

Updated to match(es) played on unknown. Source:
Legend: Blue = home team win; Yellow = draw; Red = away team win.

=== Stadia and locations ===
Location of the clubs in the 2019–20 Midland League Division One

Club	Stadium	Capacity
Ashby Ivanhoe	Lower Packington Road	
Atherstone Town	Sheepy Road	3,500
Brocton	Silkmore Lane	
Cadbury Athletic	Triplex Sports Ground	
Chelmsley Town	Pack Meadow	
Coventry Copsewood	Allard Way	2,000
GNP Sports	Sphinx Drive (groundshare with Coventry Sphinx)	1,000
Heath Hayes	Coppice Colliery Ground	
Hinckley	Miners Welfare Ground	
Kirby Muxloe	Ratby Lane	
Leicester Road	Leicester Road Stadium	4,329
Lichfield City	City Ground	1,500
NKF Burbage	Kirkby Road	
Nuneaton Griff	The Pingles Stadium	6,000
Paget Rangers	Coles Lane	2,000
Rocester	Hillsfield	4,000
Stafford Town	Evans Park	
Stapenhill	Edge Hill	1,500
Studley	The Beehive	1,500
Uttoxeter Town	Oldfields	

== Division Two ==
Midland Football League Division Two
- Season: 2019–20

Division Two featured 15 clubs which competed in the previous season, along with one new club:

- Alcester Town, promoted from Division Three

Also, Moor Green Academy changed name to Solihull United.

=== League table ===
Pos	Team	Pld	W	D	L	GF	GA	GD	Pts
1	Solihull United	24	18	1	5	79	35	+44	55
2	Northfield Town	20	13	4	3	60	19	+41	43
3	Knowle	19	13	3	3	49	27	+22	42
4	Coton Green	22	12	1	9	58	43	+15	37
5	Boldmere Sports & Social Falcons	21	10	4	7	54	31	+23	34
6	Feckenham	16	10	3	3	44	18	+26	33
7	FC Stratford	17	10	2	5	38	24	+14	32
8	Coventry Alvis	15	7	2	6	38	30	+8	23
9	Fairfield Villa	18	7	2	9	29	41	−12	23
10	Earlswood Town	13	6	1	6	20	21	−1	19
11	Hampton	17	5	3	9	29	36	−7	18
12	Barnt Green Spartak	15	5	3	7	28	36	−8	18
13	Alcester Town	16	4	3	9	26	45	−19	15
14	Lane Head	23	2	2	19	33	97	−64	8
15	Redditch Borough	15	2	1	12	20	51	−31	7
16	Bolehall Swifts	17	2	1	14	9	60	−51	7

Updated to match(es) played on unknown. Source: FA Full-Time

== Division Three ==
Midland Football League Division Three
- Season: 2019–20

Division Three featured 13 clubs which competed in the division last season, along with 3 new clubs:

- Sutton United, joined from the Birmingham & District League
- Welland, joined from the Gloucestershire Northern Senior League
- Upton Town, joined from the Cheltenham & District League

=== League table ===
Pos	Team	Pld	W	D	L	GF	GA	GD	Pts	Promotion or relegation
1	Sutton United	17	14	2	1	63	14	+49	44	
2	Inkberrow	18	13	3	2	70	23	+47	42	
3	FC Shush	18	10	2	6	44	34	+10	32	
4	Welland	18	10	2	6	41	33	+8	32	
5	Continental Star	24	11	1	12	63	64	−1	31 (Note: Continental Star 3 points deducted.)	
6	Coventry Plumbing	12	9	1	2	45	18	+27	28	
7	Coventrians	14	7	4	3	37	25	+12	25	
8	Birmingham Tigers	15	7	3	5	32	18	+14	24	
9	Enville Athletic	16	6	4	6	32	23	+9	22	
10	Central Ajax	13	6	4	3	24	21	+3	22	
11	WLV Sport	19	7	1	11	31	54	−23	22	
12	Leamington Hibs	20	6	2	12	29	50	−21	20	
13	Upton Town	19	5	5	9	23	44	−21	20	
14	AFC Solihull	18	5	3	10	29	37	−8	18	
15	Castle Vale Town	25	4	3	18	30	83	−53	15	
16	Shipston Excelsior	20	2	2	16	26	78	−52	8	Transferred to the Hellenic League Division Two West

Source: fchd
Rules for classification: 1) points; 2) goal difference; 3) number of goals scored.
