= 2020–21 Midland Football League =

The 2020–21 Midland Football League season was the 7th in the history of the Midland Football League, a football competition in England. The Midland League operates two divisions in the English football league system, the Premier Division at Step 5, and Division One at Step 6, and these two levels are covered by this article.

The allocations for Steps 5 and 6 for season 2020–21 were announced by The Football Association on 21 July, and were subject to appeal.

The 2020–21 season started in September and was suspended in December a result of the COVID-19 pandemic in England. The league season was subsequently abandoned on 24 February 2021.

The scheduled restructure of non-League took place at the end of the season, with new divisions added to the Combined Counties and United Counties Leagues at Step 5 for 2021-22, along with new a division in the Northern Premier League at step 4. Promotions from Steps 5 to 4 and 6 to 5 were based on points per game across all matches over the two cancelled seasons (2019-20 and 2020-21), while teams were promoted to Step 6 on the basis of a subjective application process. As a result, seven Midland League clubs were transferred to the expanded United Counties League's Premier divisions.

== Premier Division ==
Midland Football League Premier Division
- Season: 2020–21
- Matches: 99
- Goals: 364 (3.68 per match)

This division comprised 19 teams, one less than the previous season, South Normanton Athletic having resigned at the end of the season.

Before the season started, Newark Flowserve changed name to Newark.

=== League table ===
Pos	Team	Pld	W	D	L	GF	GA	GD	Pts	Promotion or qualification
1	Sporting Khalsa	11	8	2	1	31	16	+15	26	Promoted to the Northern Premier League (Note: Sporting Khalsa promoted based on points per game calculations from 2019–20 and 2020–21 seasons combined.)
2	Stourport Swifts	13	7	2	4	32	19	+13	23	
3	Long Eaton United	8	7	1	0	31	4	+27	22	Transferred to the United Counties League
4	Newark	10	6	3	1	19	9	+10	21	Transferred to the United Counties League
5	Lye Town	15	5	5	5	25	22	+3	20	
6	Romulus	10	5	4	1	13	6	+7	19	
7	Gresley Rovers	11	6	1	4	23	21	+2	19	Transferred to the United Counties League
8	Tividale	15	5	4	6	29	29	0	19	
9	Coventry United	9	6	0	3	23	15	+8	18	Transferred to the United Counties League
10	AFC Wulfrunians	10	4	5	1	14	9	+5	17	
11	Walsall Wood	10	4	2	4	18	13	+5	14	
12	Coventry Sphinx	10	4	2	4	19	15	+4	14	Transferred to the United Counties League
13	Racing Club Warwick	9	2	4	3	16	15	+1	10	
14	Worcester City	12	2	4	6	14	21	−7	10	
15	Heather St John's	11	2	2	7	10	26	−16	8	Transferred to the United Counties League
16	Boldmere St Michaels	6	2	1	3	10	15	−5	7	
17	Highgate United	8	1	2	5	15	18	−3	5	
18	Haughmond	10	0	1	9	10	40	−30	1	
19	Selston	10	0	1	9	12	51	−39	1	Transferred to the United Counties League

Source: FA Full-Time
Rules for classification: 1) Points; 2) Goal difference; 3) Number of goals scored; 4) Number of matches won; 5) Head-to-head results

=== Stadia and locations ===
Location of the clubs in the 2020–21 Midland League Premier Division

Club	Stadium	Capacity
AFC Wulfrunians	Castlecroft Stadium	2,000
Boldmere St. Michaels	Trevor Brown Memorial Ground	2,500
Coventry Sphinx	Sphinx Drive	1,000
Coventry United	Butts Park Arena	3,000
Gresley	Moat Ground	2,400
Haughmond	Shrewsbury Sport Village	
Heather St John's	St. John's Park	
Highgate United	The Coppice	2,000
Long Eaton United	Grange Park	3,000
Lye Town	The Sports Ground	1,000
Newark	Hawton Lane	
Racing Club Warwick	Townsend Meadow	1,280
Romulus	The Central Ground	2,000
Selston	Mansfield Road	
Sporting Khalsa	Aspray Arena	2,500
Stourport Swifts	Walshes Meadow	2,000
Tividale	The Beeches	2,800
Walsall Wood	Oak Park	1,000
Worcester City	Victoria Ground	3,500

== Division One ==
Midland Football League Division One
- Season: 2020–21
- Matches: 118
- Goals: 432 (3.66 per match)

This division comprised 19 teams, one less than the previous season, NKF Burbage having folded at the end of the season.

=== League table ===
Pos	Team	Pld	W	D	L	GF	GA	GD	Pts	Promotion or relegation
1	Lichfield City	15	10	2	3	33	13	+20	32	Promoted to the Premier Division
2	Leicester Road	11	8	2	1	27	5	+22	26	Promoted to the United Counties League
3	Ashby Ivanhoe	12	8	2	2	33	17	+16	26	
4	Hinckley	12	7	3	2	26	19	+7	24	Transferred to the United Counties League
5	Kirby Muxloe	12	7	3	2	24	21	+3	24	Transferred to the United Counties League
6	Nuneaton Griff	14	6	3	5	20	18	+2	21	
7	Heath Hayes	13	6	3	4	21	20	+1	21	
8	Stapenhill	11	6	2	3	22	12	+10	20	
9	Atherstone Town	13	6	2	5	28	21	+7	20	
10	Uttoxeter Town	11	6	1	4	25	15	+10	19	Promoted to the Premier Division
11	Brocton	13	4	5	4	26	20	+6	17	Transferred to the North West Counties League
12	Chelmsley Town	15	5	2	8	25	31	−6	17	
13	Studley	10	3	3	4	21	15	+6	12	Transferred to the Hellenic League
14	Rocester	12	3	3	6	22	24	−2	12	Transferred to the North West Counties League
15	Coventry Copsewood	13	3	2	8	23	38	−15	11	
16	Stafford Town	14	3	2	9	20	38	−18	11	Transferred to the North West Counties League
17	Cadbury Athletic	11	2	1	8	14	36	−22	7	Voluntary demoted to Division Two
18	GNP Sports	11	1	3	7	10	26	−16	6	Resigned to the Coventry Alliance League
19	Paget Rangers	13	2	0	11	12	43	−31	6	

Source: FA Full-Time
Rules for classification: 1) Points; 2) Goal difference; 3) Number of goals scored; 4) Number of matches won; 5) Head-to-head results

=== Stadia and locations ===
Location of the clubs in the 2019–20 Midland League Division One

Club	Stadium	Capacity
Ashby Ivanhoe	Lower Packington Road	
Atherstone Town	Sheepy Road	3,500
Brocton	Silkmore Lane	
Cadbury Athletic	Triplex Sports Ground	
Chelmsley Town	Pack Meadow	
Coventry Copsewood	Allard Way	2,000
GNP Sports	Sphinx Drive (groundshare with Coventry Sphinx)	1,000
Heath Hayes	Coppice Colliery Ground	
Hinckley	Kirkby Road (groundshare with Barwell)	2,500
Kirby Muxloe	Ratby Lane	
Leicester Road	Leicester Road Stadium	4,329
Lichfield City	City Ground	1,500
Nuneaton Griff	The Pingles Stadium	6,000
Paget Rangers	Coles Lane	2,000
Rocester	Hillsfield	4,000
Stafford Town	Evans Park	
Stapenhill	Edge Hill	1,500
Studley	The Beehive	1,500
Uttoxeter Town	Oldfields	

== Division Two ==
Midland Football League Division Two
- Season: 2020–21
- Champions: Solihull United
- Promoted: FC Stratford

Division Two featured 16 clubs, all from last season.

=== League table ===
Pos	Team	Pld	W	D	L	GF	GA	GD	Pts	Promotion or relegation
1	Solihull United	8	7	1	0	28	6	+22	22	Resigned from the league
2	Knowle	9	5	2	2	21	14	+7	17	
3	Coton Green	9	5	0	4	23	12	+11	15	
4	FC Stratford	8	4	3	1	20	15	+5	15	Promoted to Hellenic League Division One
5	Hampton	8	4	3	1	13	12	+1	15	
6	Barnt Green Spartak	8	4	2	2	23	16	+7	14	
7	Coventry Alvis	9	4	1	4	21	17	+4	13	
8	Alcester Town	8	3	3	2	11	13	−2	12	
9	Feckenham	5	3	1	1	14	12	+2	10	Resigned from the league
10	Earlswood Town	6	3	0	3	15	15	0	9	
11	Northfield Town	9	2	3	4	9	18	−9	9	Resigned from the league
12	Boldmere Sports & Social Falcon	8	2	2	4	13	14	−1	8	
13	Lane Head	9	2	2	5	13	23	−10	8	
14	Bolehall Swifts	10	2	0	8	8	20	−12	6	
15	Redditch Borough	7	1	1	5	11	21	−10	4	
16	Fairfield Villa	5	0	0	5	5	20	−15	0	

Source: FA Full-Time

== Division Three ==
Midland Football League Division Three
- Season: 2020–21
- Champions: Kenilworth Sporting
- Promoted: Kenilworth Sporting; Inkberrow

Division Three featured 15 clubs which competed in the division last season, along with 1 new club:

- Tamworth Academy

Also, Coventry Plumbing changed name to Kenilworth Sporting.

=== League table ===
Pos	Team	Pld	W	D	L	GF	GA	GD	Pts	Promotion or relegation
1	Kenilworth Sporting	8	7	0	1	26	7	+19	21	Promoted to Division Two
2	Inkberrow	8	6	1	1	32	15	+17	19	Promoted to Division Two
3	Central Ajax	7	6	0	1	22	7	+15	18	
4	Enville Athletic	9	5	2	2	16	12	+4	17	
5	Coventrians	7	5	0	2	29	13	+16	15	
6	AFC Solihull	8	4	1	3	30	20	+10	13	
7	Upton Town	6	4	1	1	14	11	+3	13	
8	Sutton United	7	4	0	3	26	13	+13	12	
9	FC Shush	7	4	0	3	22	18	+4	12	Resigned from the league
10	Welland	7	3	1	3	16	14	+2	10	Transferred to the Herefordshire County FA League
11	Tamworth Academy	5	3	0	2	16	8	+8	9	Resigned from the league
12	Leamington Hibs	8	1	2	5	15	30	−15	5	
13	WLV Sport	9	1	1	7	7	23	−16	4	
14	Continental Star	8	1	1	6	12	30	−18	4	
15	Birmingham Tigers	7	1	0	6	13	27	−14	3	
16	Castle Vale Town	9	0	0	9	12	60	−48	0	

Source: FA Full-Time
Rules for classification: 1) points; 2) goal difference; 3) number of goals scored.
