= 2021–22 United Counties League =

English football league

The 2021–22 season was the 115th in the history of the United Counties League, a football competition in England. The league operated three divisions in the English football league system for the first time since the 1979–80 season. These are the Premier Divisions North and South at Step 5, both firsts in the league, and Division One at Step 6.

The allocations for Steps 5 and 6 were announced by The Football Association on 18 May 2021, and were subject to appeal.

After the abandonment of the 2019–20 and 2020–21 seasons due to the COVID-19 pandemic in England, numerous promotions were decided on a points per game basis over the previous two seasons. As part of the National League System's restructure, the FA's Alliance and Leagues Committees recommended the league's expansion to gain another Step 5 division. At the end of the past season, Shepshed Dynamo left the league through promotion to the new Northern Premier League Division One Midlands, the only former Premier Division club to do so.

== Premier Division North ==
United Counties League Premier Division North
- Season: 2021–22
- Champions: Long Eaton United
- Promoted: Gresley Rovers; Long Eaton United
- Relegated: Holbeach United
- Matches: 306
- Goals: 1,126 (3.68 per match)

In its first season the Premier Division North featured nine clubs which competed in the Premier Division last season, along with nine new clubs.

- Transferred from the Midland League:
  - Gresley Rovers
  - Heather St John's
  - Long Eaton United
  - Newark
  - Selston
- Promoted from the East Midlands Counties League:
  - Eastwood
  - Heanor Town
- Plus:
  - Melton Town, promoted from Division One
  - Skegness Town, promoted from the Northern Counties East League

In addition, Loughborough University began to compete as Loughborough Students.

=== League table ===
| Pos | Team | Pld | W | D | L | GF | GA | GD | Pts | Promotion, qualification or relegation |
|---|---|---|---|---|---|---|---|---|---|---|
| 1 | Long Eaton United | 34 | 28 | 5 | 1 | 106 | 20 | +86 | 89 | Promoted to the Northern Premier League East |
| 2 | Gresley Rovers (Note: Gresley Rovers were awarded a home win due to non-fulfilment of a fixture by Boston Town on 10 December 2021.) | 34 | 27 | 5 | 2 | 91 | 31 | +60 | 86 | Promoted to the Northern Premier League Midlands |
| 3 | Anstey Nomads | 34 | 23 | 6 | 5 | 95 | 33 | +62 | 75 | |
| 4 | Loughborough Students | 34 | 21 | 5 | 8 | 90 | 35 | +55 | 68 | |
| 5 | Deeping Rangers | 34 | 16 | 5 | 13 | 53 | 56 | −3 | 53 | |
| 6 | Heather St John's | 34 | 16 | 5 | 13 | 66 | 70 | −4 | 53 | |
| 7 | Melton Town | 34 | 15 | 7 | 12 | 70 | 56 | +14 | 52 | |
| 8 | Skegness Town | 34 | 16 | 4 | 14 | 59 | 51 | +8 | 52 | |
| 9 | Boston Town | 34 | 14 | 8 | 12 | 62 | 64 | −2 | 50 | |
| 10 | Heanor Town | 34 | 14 | 5 | 15 | 62 | 57 | +5 | 47 | |
| 11 | Leicester Nirvana | 34 | 15 | 2 | 17 | 70 | 72 | −2 | 47 | |
| 12 | Sleaford Town | 34 | 14 | 3 | 17 | 55 | 63 | −8 | 45 | |
| 13 | Quorn | 34 | 11 | 8 | 15 | 59 | 62 | −3 | 41 | |
| 14 | Eastwood | 34 | 9 | 6 | 19 | 54 | 77 | −23 | 33 | |
| 15 | Selston | 34 | 8 | 4 | 22 | 37 | 79 | −42 | 28 | |
| 16 | Newark | 34 | 8 | 3 | 23 | 49 | 97 | −48 | 24 (Note: Newark were deducted three points for fielding an ineligible player against Deeping Rangers on 2 October.) | |
| 17 | Pinchbeck United | 34 | 6 | 5 | 23 | 33 | 83 | −50 | 23 | Reprieved from relegation (Note: Reprieved as one of 12 clubs with the most PPG out of 16 that were second-from-bottom at Step 5.) |
| 18 | Holbeach United | 34 | 0 | 4 | 30 | 15 | 120 | −105 | 4 | Relegated to the Eastern Counties League |

Source: The FA Full-Time
Rules for classification: 1) points; 2) goal difference; 3) number of goals scored; 4) number of matches won; 5) head-to-head results

=== Stadia and locations ===
Location of the Premier Division North clubs

| Club | Location | Stadium | Capacity |
|---|---|---|---|
| Anstey Nomads | Anstey | Cropston Road | |
| Boston Town | Boston | Tattershall Road | 6,000 |
| Deeping Rangers | Market Deeping | Haydon Whitham Stadium | 2,000 |
| Eastwood | Eastwood | Coronation Park | |
| Gresley Rovers | Church Gresley | Moat Ground | 2,400 |
| Heather St John's | Heather | St John's Park | |
| Heanor Town | Heanor | Town Ground | |
| Holbeach United | Holbeach | Carters Park | 4,000 |
| Leicester Nirvana | Leicester | Hamilton Park | |
| Long Eaton United | Long Eaton | Grange Park | 3,000 |
| Loughborough Students | Loughborough | Loughborough University Stadium | 3,000 |
| Melton Town | Melton Mowbray | Melton Sports Village | |
| Newark | Newark-on-Trent | Hawton Lane | |
| Pinchbeck United | Spalding | Sir Halley Stewart Field | 2,700 |
| Quorn | Quorn | Farley Way Stadium | 1,400 |
| Selston | Selston | Mansfield Road | |
| Skegness Town | Skegness | Vertigo Stadium | |
| Sleaford Town | Sleaford | Eslaforde Park | 1,000 |

== Premier Division South ==
United Counties League Premier Division South
- Season: 2021–22
- Champions: Harborough Town
- Promoted: Harborough Town; Hinckley Leicester Road
- Relegated: Northampton ON Chenecks
- Matches: 380
- Goals: 1,333 (3.51 per match)

In its first season the Premier Division South featured ten clubs which competed in the Premier Division last season, along with eleven new clubs.

- Promoted from Division One:
  - Bugbrooke St Michaels
  - Long Buckby
- Transferred from the Midland League:
  - Coventry Sphinx
  - Coventry United
- Transferred from the Spartan South Midlands League:
  - Biggleswade United
  - Eynesbury Rovers
  - Newport Pagnell Town
  - Potton United
- Plus:
  - Easington Sports, transferred from the Hellenic League
  - Godmanchester Rovers, transferred from the Eastern Counties League
  - Leicester Road, promoted from the Midland League

In September 2021 Leicester Road were renamed Hinckley LRFC.

=== League table ===
| Pos | Team | Pld | W | D | L | GF | GA | GD | Pts | Promotion, qualification or relegation |
|---|---|---|---|---|---|---|---|---|---|---|
| 1 | Harborough Town | 38 | 33 | 3 | 2 | 119 | 20 | +99 | 102 | Promoted to the Northern Premier League |
| 2 | Hinckley Leicester Road | 38 | 32 | 3 | 3 | 108 | 29 | +79 | 99 | Promoted to the Northern Premier League |
| 3 | Rugby Town | 38 | 25 | 4 | 9 | 82 | 50 | +32 | 79 | |
| 4 | Coventry Sphinx | 38 | 24 | 3 | 11 | 95 | 44 | +51 | 75 | |
| 5 | Newport Pagnell Town | 38 | 24 | 3 | 11 | 83 | 44 | +39 | 75 | |
| 6 | Lutterworth Town | 38 | 20 | 7 | 11 | 80 | 58 | +22 | 67 | |
| 7 | Wellingborough Town | 38 | 20 | 6 | 12 | 68 | 52 | +16 | 66 | |
| 8 | Coventry United | 38 | 18 | 6 | 14 | 76 | 59 | +17 | 60 | |
| 9 | Eynesbury Rovers | 38 | 14 | 7 | 17 | 55 | 59 | −4 | 49 | |
| 10 | Potton United | 38 | 13 | 7 | 18 | 57 | 68 | −11 | 46 | Transferred to the Spartan South Midlands League |
| 11 | Godmanchester Rovers | 38 | 13 | 6 | 19 | 64 | 74 | −10 | 45 | |
| 12 | Cogenhoe United | 38 | 12 | 9 | 17 | 57 | 69 | −12 | 45 | |
| 13 | Long Buckby | 38 | 12 | 6 | 20 | 64 | 101 | −37 | 42 | |
| 14 | Easington Sports | 38 | 12 | 5 | 21 | 57 | 71 | −14 | 41 | |
| 15 | Bugbrooke St Michaels | 38 | 14 | 5 | 19 | 60 | 77 | −17 | 41 (Note: Bugbrooke St Michaels were deducted three points for fielding an ineligible player against Rothwell Corinthians on 3 August 2021 and an additional 3 points for the same infraction against Eynesbury Rovers on 20 November.) | |
| 16 | GNG Oadby Town | 38 | 11 | 8 | 19 | 51 | 74 | −23 | 41 | |
| 17 | Desborough Town | 38 | 11 | 8 | 19 | 53 | 72 | −19 | 38 (Note: Desborough Town were deducted three points also for fielding an ineligible player against Long Buckby on 9 October.) | |
| 18 | Rothwell Corinthians | 38 | 5 | 8 | 25 | 36 | 78 | −42 | 23 | |
| 19 | Biggleswade United | 38 | 6 | 3 | 29 | 38 | 138 | −100 | 21 | Transferred to the Spartan South Midlands League |
| 20 | Northampton ON Chenecks | 38 | 5 | 5 | 28 | 30 | 96 | −66 | 20 | Relegated to the Spartan South Midlands League (Note: Relegated as one of four clubs with the fewest PPG out of 16 that were second-from-bottom at Step 5.) |
| 21 | Peterborough Northern Star | 0 | 0 | 0 | 0 | 0 | 0 | 0 | 0 (Note: Peterborough Northern Star resigned from the league on 15 November 2021 and their playing record of P20 W2 D1 L17 GF34 GA75 Pts7 was expunged.) | Club folded, record expunged |

Source: The FA Full-Time
Rules for classification: 1) points; 2) goal difference; 3) number of goals scored; 4) number of matches won; 5) head-to-head results

=== Stadia and locations ===
Location of the Premier Division South clubs

| Club | Location | Stadium | Capacity |
|---|---|---|---|
| Biggleswade United | Biggleswade | Second Meadow | 2,000 |
| Bugbrooke St. Michaels | Bugbrooke | Birds Close | 2,500 |
| Cogenhoe United | Cogenhoe | Compton Park | 5,000 |
| Coventry Sphinx | Coventry | Sphinx Drive | |
| Coventry United | Coventry | Butts Park Arena (Note: home of Coventry Rugby Club (groundshare)) | 4,000 |
| Desborough Town | Desborough | Waterworks Field | |
| Easington Sports | Banbury | Addison Road | |
| Eynesbury Rovers | Eynesbury | Alfred Hall Memorial Ground | |
| GNG Oadby Town | Oadby | Wigston Road | 3,000 |
| Godmanchester Rovers | Godmanchester | Bearscroft Lane | |
| Harborough Town | Market Harborough | Bowden Park | |
| Hinckley Leicester Road | Hinckley | Leicester Road Stadium | 4,329 |
| Long Buckby | Long Buckby | Station Road | 1,000 |
| Lutterworth Town | Lutterworth | Dunley Way | |
| Newport Pagnell Town | Newport Pagnell | Willen Road | 2,000 |
| Northampton ON Chenecks | Northampton | The Old Northamptonians Sports Ground | 1,000 |
| Peterborough Northern Star | Peterborough | Branch Bros Stadium | 600 |
| Potton United | Potton | The Hollow | |
| Rothwell Corinthians | Rothwell | Sergeants Lawn | |
| Rugby Town | Rugby | Butlin Road | 6,000 |
| Wellingborough Town | Wellingborough | London Road | 2,500 |

== Division One ==
United Counties League Division One
- Season: 2021–22
- Champions: Kimberley Miners Welfare
- Promoted: Belper United; Kimberley Miners Welfare
- Relegated: Borrowash Victoria
- Matches: 506
- Goals: 1,991 (3.93 per match)

Division One featured nine clubs which competed in the division last season, along with 14 new clubs:

- Transferred from the East Midland Counties League:
  - Barrow Town
  - Belper United
  - Borrowash Victoria
  - Clifton All Whites
  - Dunkirk
  - Gedling Miners Welfare
  - Graham Street Prims
  - Hucknall Town
  - Ingles
  - Kimberley Miners Welfare
  - Radford
  - West Bridgford
- Transferred from the Midland League:
  - Hinckley
  - Kirby Muxloe

=== League table ===
| Pos | Team | Pld | W | D | L | GF | GA | GD | Pts | Promotion, qualification or relegation |
|---|---|---|---|---|---|---|---|---|---|---|
| 1 | Kimberley Miners Welfare (Note: Kimberley Miners Welfare were awarded a home win due to non-fulfilment of a fixture by Aylestone Park on 18 December.) | 44 | 36 | 4 | 4 | 137 | 33 | +104 | 112 | Promoted to the Premier Division North |
| 2 | Hinckley (Note: Hinckley were awarded a home win due to non-fulfilment of a fixture by St Andrews on 17 December.) | 44 | 33 | 4 | 7 | 148 | 56 | +92 | 103 | Qualified for the play-offs, then transferred to the Midland League |
| 3 | Belper United | 44 | 31 | 5 | 8 | 126 | 50 | +76 | 98 | Qualified for the play-offs, then promoted to the Premier Division North |
| 4 | Radford | 44 | 32 | 1 | 11 | 105 | 47 | +58 | 97 | Qualified for the play-offs |
| 5 | Hucknall Town | 44 | 28 | 6 | 10 | 120 | 68 | +52 | 90 | Qualified for the play-offs |
| 6 | Aylestone Park | 44 | 25 | 11 | 8 | 144 | 52 | +92 | 86 | |
| 7 | Dunkirk | 44 | 22 | 8 | 14 | 94 | 77 | +17 | 74 | |
| 8 | Barrow Town | 44 | 20 | 10 | 14 | 87 | 69 | +18 | 70 | |
| 9 | Kirby Muxloe | 44 | 21 | 4 | 19 | 107 | 93 | +14 | 67 | |
| 10 | Harrowby United | 44 | 18 | 10 | 16 | 91 | 80 | +11 | 64 | |
| 11 | Clifton All Whites | 44 | 18 | 6 | 20 | 84 | 92 | −8 | 60 | |
| 12 | Birstall United | 44 | 17 | 8 | 19 | 65 | 80 | −15 | 59 | |
| 13 | Gedling Miners Welfare | 44 | 17 | 4 | 23 | 84 | 103 | −19 | 55 | |
| 14 | Saffron Dynamo | 44 | 14 | 10 | 20 | 76 | 96 | −20 | 52 | |
| 15 | St Andrews (Note: St Andrews were awarded a home win due to abandoned fixture against Bourne Town on 19 October 2021. They were then deducted 1 point due to fielding an ineligible player against Aylestone Park on 28 December.) | 44 | 15 | 7 | 22 | 67 | 83 | −16 | 51 | |
| 16 | Lutterworth Athletic | 44 | 13 | 9 | 22 | 66 | 90 | −24 | 48 | Transferred to the Spartan South Midlands League |
| 17 | West Bridgford | 44 | 14 | 5 | 25 | 73 | 104 | −31 | 47 | |
| 18 | Ingles (Note: Ingles were awarded an away win due to non-fulfilment of a fixture by Holwell Sports on 4 January 2022.) | 44 | 13 | 6 | 25 | 57 | 96 | −39 | 45 | Transferred to the Midland League |
| 19 | Bourne Town | 44 | 11 | 11 | 22 | 57 | 100 | −43 | 44 | |
| 20 | Holwell Sports | 44 | 10 | 5 | 29 | 61 | 108 | −47 | 35 | |
| 21 | Graham Street Prims | 44 | 8 | 8 | 28 | 57 | 116 | −59 | 32 | Demoted to the Central Midlands League (Note: Reprieved and transferred to the Midland League, but declined and demoted to the Central Midlands League.) |
| 22 | Blackstones | 44 | 8 | 7 | 29 | 54 | 142 | −88 | 31 | Reprieved from relegation (Note: All third-from-bottom clubs at Step 6 were reprieved from relegation. The top 15 second-from-bottom sides were also reprieved on a PPG basis.) |
| 23 | Borrowash Victoria | 44 | 5 | 5 | 34 | 31 | 156 | −125 | 20 | Relegated to the Nottinghamshire Senior League |

Source: The FA Full-Time
Rules for classification: 1) points; 2) goal difference; 3) number of goals scored; 4) number of matches won; 5) head-to-head results

=== Play-offs ===
Semi-finals
2 | Hinckley | 3
5 | Hucknall Town | 0
3 | Belper United | 2
4 | Radford | 1

Final
2 | Hinckley | 0
3 | Belper United | 1

==== Semifinals ====
| 30 April 2022 | Hinckley | 3–0 | Hucknall Town | Barwell |
| | | | | Stadium: Kirkby Road; Attendance: 502 |

| 30 April 2022 | Belper United | 2–1 | Radford | Belper |
| | | | | Stadium: Christchurch Meadow; Attendance: 235 |

==== Final ====
| 7 May 2022 | Hinckley | 0–1 | Belper United | Barwell |
| | | | | Stadium: Kirkby Road; Attendance: 811 |

=== Stadia and locations ===
Location of Division One clubs

| Club | Location | Stadium | Capacity |
|---|---|---|---|
| Aylestone Park | Leicester | Saffron Lane | 1,128 |
| Barrow Town | Barrow upon Soar | Riverside Park | 2,000 |
| Belper United | Belper | Christchurch Meadow (Note: home of Belper Town (groundshare)) | 2,650 |
| Birstall United | Birstall | Meadow Lane | |
| Blackstones | Stamford | Lincoln Road | 1,000 |
| Borrowash Victoria | Spondon | Borrowash Road (Note: part of the same complex as Graham Street Prims) | |
| Bourne Town | Bourne | Abbey Lawn | 2,000 |
| Clifton All Whites | Nottingham (Clifton) | Green Lane | |
| Dunkirk | Nottingham (Dunkirk) | Lenton Lane | 1,500 |
| Gedling Miners Welfare | Gedling | Plains Road | |
| Graham Street Prims | Spondon | Borrowash Road (Note: part of the same complex as Borrowash Victoria) | |
| Harrowby United | Grantham | Dickens Road | |
| Hinckley AFC | Heather | Kirkby Road (Note: Groundshare with Barwell) | 2,500 |
| Holwell Sports | Asfordby Hill | Welby Road | 1,000 |
| Hucknall Town | Hucknall | Watnall Road | 5,000 |
| Ingles | Shepshed | The Dovecote Stadium (Note: home of Shepshed Albion (groundshare)) | |
| Kimberley Miners Welfare | Kimberley | Stag Ground | |
| Kirby Muxloe | Kirby Muxloe | Ratby Lane | 3,000 |
| Lutterworth Athletic | Lutterworth | Hall Park | |
| Radford | Nottingham (Radford) | Selhurst Street | |
| Saffron Dynamo | Cosby | Cambridge Road | |
| St Andrews | Leicester | Canal Street | 1,000 |
| West Bridgford | West Bridgford | Regatta Way | |
