= 2018–19 East Midlands Counties Football League =

The 2018–19 East Midlands Counties Football League season was the 11th in the history of East Midlands Counties Football League, a football competition in England at level 10 of the English football league system.

== League ==
East Midlands Counties Football League
- Season: 2018–19
- Champions: Selston
- Promoted: Selston; Newark Flowserve
- Relegated: Arnold Town
- Matches: 380
- Goals: 1,516 (3.99 per match)

The league featured 13 clubs from the previous season, along with seven new clubs.

- Clubs relegated from the Northern Counties East League:
  - Clipstone
  - Rainworth Miners Welfare
- Clubs promoted from the Central Midlands League:
  - Eastwood
  - Sherwood Colliery
- Plus:
  - Heanor Town, relegated from the Midland League
  - Ingles, promoted from the Leicestershire Senior League
  - Newark Flowserve, promoted from the Nottinghamshire Senior League

=== League table ===
Pos	Team	Pld	W	D	L	GF	GA	GD	Pts	Promotion or relegation
1	Selston	38	29	7	2	120	36	+84	94	Promoted to the Midland League
2	Newark Flowserve	38	28	4	6	139	33	+106	88	Promoted to the Midland League
3	Sherwood Colliery	38	27	4	7	95	44	+51	85	
4	Heanor Town	38	24	2	12	95	45	+50	71 (Note: Heanor Town were deducted three points for fielding an ineligible player in the match on 10 November.)	
5	Radford	38	22	4	12	92	59	+33	70	
6	Eastwood	38	21	5	12	91	60	+31	68	
7	Graham Street Prims	38	22	2	14	94	64	+30	68	
8	Barrow Town	38	21	3	14	77	71	+6	66	
9	Kimberley Miners Welfare	38	17	10	11	61	53	+8	61	
10	Belper United	38	17	8	13	80	55	+25	59	
11	Ingles	38	18	4	16	78	61	+17	55 (Note: Ingles were deducted three points for fielding an ineligible player in the match on 12 January.)	
12	Clifton All Whites	38	15	6	17	89	73	+16	51	
13	West Bridgford	38	16	3	19	66	104	−38	51	
14	Ashby Ivanhoe	38	13	2	23	66	82	−16	41	Transferred to the Midland League Division One
15	Teversal	38	11	3	24	51	72	−21	36	
16	Gedling Miners Welfare	38	10	6	22	56	83	−27	36	
17	Rainworth Miners Welfare	38	10	4	24	49	90	−41	34	
18	Clipstone	38	7	4	27	51	107	−56	25	
19	Borrowash Victoria	38	5	3	30	31	170	−139	18	
20	Arnold Town	38	3	4	31	35	154	−119	13	Relegated to the Central Midlands League

Source: FA Full-Time
Rules for classification: 1) Points; 2) Goal difference; 3) Number of goals scored; 4) Number of matches won; 5) Head-to-head results

=== Stadia and locations ===
Location of the clubs in the 2018–19 East Midlands Counties League on a map of the East Midlands

Club	Stadium
Arnold Town	Eagle Valley
Ashby Ivanhoe	Lower Packington Road
Barrow Town	Barrow Road
Belper United	Christchurch Meadow
Borrowash Victoria	Borrowash Road
Clifton All Whites	Green Lane
Clipstone	Lido Ground
Eastwood Community	Coronation Park
Gedling Miners Welfare	Plains Road
Graham Street Prims	Borrowash Road
Heanor Town	Town Ground
Ingles	The Dovecote Stadium
Kimberley Miners Welfare	Stag Ground
Newark Flowserve	Hawton Lane
Radford	Selhurst Street
Rainworth Miners Welfare	Kirklington Road
Selston	Mansfield Road
Sherwood Colliery	Debdale Park
Teversal	Carnarvon Street
West Bridgford	Regatta Way
