= Uttoxeter Town F.C. =

Association football club in England

Coordinates: 52°53′59.6″N 1°52′28.7″W

Uttoxeter Town
- Full name: Uttoxeter Town Football Club
- Nickname: Town
- Founded: 1983
- Ground: Oldfields Sports Ground, Uttoxeter
- Chairman: Malcolm Timmins
- Manager: Jacob Sturgess
- League: Midland League Premier Division
- 2025–26: Midland League Premier Division, 16th of 18
Home colours	Away colours

Uttoxeter Town F.C. is an English football club based in Uttoxeter, Staffordshire. They currently play in the Midland Premier League. The club is a FA Charter Standard Club affiliated to the Staffordshire Football Association.

== History ==
The club was formed in 1972 when they split from Uttoxeter Amateurs after a disagreement on the club's location. The club joined the North Premier Division of the Staffordshire County League. In the late 1970s, the club stopped playing Saturday football and switched over to Sunday league football.

About 30 years later, the club switched back to Saturday football and joined the Staffordshire County Senior League. The 2012–13 season saw the club win Division one of the league. The 2014–15 season saw the club become one of the founding members of the Midland Football League, joining division one. Despite finishing fifth in the division, the club dropped back down to the Staffordshire County Senior League for financial reasons. In their first season in the Staffordshire County Senior League, the club entered the FA Vase for the first time, progressing to the third round before being eliminated by Coleshill Town. The prize money they earned from their FA Vase cup exploits enabled them to overcome their financial issues and they rejoined Division one of the Midlands league the following season.

In 2021, Uttoxeter were promoted to the Premier Division based on their results in the abandoned 2019–20 and 2020–21 seasons.

In 2023, Uttoxeter where reprieved from North West Counties South and allocated back to Midland Premier League

== Ground ==
The club play their home games at the Oldfield Sports Club.

== Records ==
- Best FA Cup performance: Preliminary round, 2021–22
- Best FA Vase performance: Third round, 2015–16

== Honours ==
- Staffordshire County Senior League
  - Division One Champions (1) 2012–13
  - Presidents Trophy Winners (1) 2012–13
