= Bohan Dixon =

English footballer

Personal information
- Full name: Bohan Soloman Cheidu Dixon
- Date of birth: 17 October 1989 (age 37)
- Place of birth: Liverpool, England
- Height: 6 ft 4 in (1.93 m)
- Position: Midfielder

Team information
- Current team: Lower Breck

Senior career*
| Years | Team | Apps | (Gls) |
| 2007–2008 | Kingsley United | | |
| 2008–2009 | Connah's Quay Nomads | 8 | (0) |
| 2009–2010 | Buckley Town | | |
| 2011 | Hednesford Town | 3 | (0) |
| 2011 | Burscough | | |
| 2011–2012 | McGinty's | | |
| 2012–2013 | Accrington Stanley | 10 | (0) |
| 2013 | → Marine (loan) | | |
| 2013–2014 | Lincoln City | 33 | (3) |
| 2014–2015 | Northwich Victoria | | |
| 2015 | Salford City | | |
| 2015–2016 | Stalybridge Celtic | 29 | (6) |
| 2016–2017 | AFC Fylde | 48 | (6) |
| 2017 | FC Halifax Town | 4 | (0) |
| 2017–2018 | Stockport County | 20 | (2) |
| 2018 | Ashton United | | |
| 2018–2024 | Warrington Town | 148 | (17) |
| 2024 | Macclesfield | 7 | (0) |
| 2024–2025 | Warrington Town | 24 | (0) |
| 2026– | Lower Breck | | |
- * Club domestic league appearances and goals as of 22:07, 20 January 2025 (UTC)

Bohan Soloman Cheidu Dixon (born 17 October 1989) is an English professional footballer who plays as a midfielder for Lower Breck.

== Career ==
=== Connah's Quay Nomads ===
Born in Liverpool, Dixon started his career with local amateur side Kingsley United before joining Welsh Premier League outfit Connah's Quay Nomads ahead of the 2008–09 season. He went on to make eight substitute appearances for the club.

=== Buckley Town ===
He transferred to Cymru Alliance side Buckley Town the following summer. He spent the 2009–10 campaign with Buckley, where he played as a striker rather than in midfield.

=== Hednesford Town ===
Dixon then played local-league football in the Liverpool area for a year before being signed by Northern Premier League club Hednesford Town in August 2011. He made his debut for the club on 27 August, coming on as a substitute for Chris Shaw in the 1–2 defeat away at Kendal Town. He went on to make two further appearances for Hednesford, both as a substitute.

=== Burscough ===
On 31 October 2011, Dixon joined Burscough on a free transfer along with former Liverpool youth team captain Sean Highdale.

=== Birkenhead & Wirral League ===
After leaving Burscough, he played for Sunday league side McGinty's in the Birkenhead & Wirral League, where he was spotted by Accrington Stanley manager Paul Cook. While playing amateur football, Dixon took college courses in construction and aspired to work as a builder.

=== Accrington Stanley ===
He signed a one-year contract with Accrington in May 2012. Dixon made his professional debut on 4 September 2012, coming on as a substitute for Karl Sheppard in the 0–2 defeat to Morecambe in the first round of the Football League Trophy.

=== Marine (loan) ===
In February 2013, Dixon joined Northern Premier League club Marine on loan, where he remained until the end of the season.

=== Lincoln City ===
After being released by Accrington, Dixon signed a one-year contract with Lincoln City in July 2013.

=== Northwich Victoria ===
In August 2014 he joined Northwich Victoria, debuting as an 81st-minute substitute in the club's home 0–0 Northern Premier League Division One North draw with Kendal Town.

=== Salford City ===
Dixon signed for Salford City on 3 January 2015, scoring on his debut on the same day under the joint management team of Paul Scholes and Phil Neville helping Salford to the Evo Stik Division One North Championship.

=== Stalybridge Celtic ===
In July 2015 Dixon signed a 1-year contract with National League North club Stalybridge Celtic.

=== AFC Fylde ===
He moved to AFC Fylde in March 2016.

=== FC Halifax Town ===
He then moved next to FC Halifax Town in May 2017.

=== Stockport County ===
After just four appearances for Halifax, he joined Stockport County on 11 September 17. At the end of the 2017/18 season, Dixon was released.

=== Ashton United ===
In July 2018, Dixon joined Ashton United.

=== Warrington Town ===
By September 2018 Dixon was playing for Warrington Town. In July 2021 he signed a new deal with the club.

=== Macclesfield ===
In February 2024, following five-and-a-half seasons and a promotion with Warrington Town, Dixon joined Northern Premier League Premier Division side Macclesfield for an undisclosed fee.

=== Return to Warrington Town ===
In June 2024, Dixon returned to Warrington Town.

=== Lower Breck ===
He signed for Lower Breck in 2026.

== Career statistics ==
As of 9 February 2024

Appearances and goals by club, season and competition
| Club | Season | League | | | FA Cup | | League Cup | | Other | | Total | |
| Club | Season | Division | Apps | Goals | Apps | Goals | Apps | Goals | Apps | Goals | Apps | Goals |
|---|---|---|---|---|---|---|---|---|---|---|---|---|
| Accrington Stanley | 2012–13 | League Two | 6 | 0 | 1 | 0 | 0 | 0 | 1 | 0 | 8 | 0 |
| Lincoln City | 2013–14 | Conference Premier Division | 29 | 3 | 3 | 1 | 0 | 0 | 1 | 0 | 33 | 4 |
| Warrington Town | 2018–19 | NPL Premier Division | 17 | 3 | 0 | 0 | — | | 3 (Note: Appearance(s) in Northern Premier League Premier Division play-offs) | 0 | 20 | 3 |
| Warrington Town | 2019–20 | NPL Premier Division | 23 | 3 | 4 | 1 | — | | 3 (Note: One appearance in FA Trophy, two appearances and one goal in Cheshire Senior Cup) | 1 | 30 | 5 |
| Warrington Town | 2020–21 | NPL Premier Division | 9 | 4 | 1 | 0 | — | | 1 (Note: Appearance(s) in FA Trophy) | 0 | 11 | 4 |
| Warrington Town | 2021–22 | NPL Premier Division | 38 | 0 | 1 | 0 | — | | 5 (Note: Three appearances in FA Trophy, two appearances in NPL Premier Division play-offs) | 0 | 44 | 0 |
| Warrington Town | 2022–23 | NPL Premier Division | 37 | 5 | 3 | 0 | — | | 6 (Note: Three appearances in FA Trophy, one appearance in Cheshire Senior Cup, two appearances and one goal in NPL Premier Division play-offs) | 1 | 46 | 7 |
| Warrington Town | 2023–24 | National League North | 24 | 2 | 1 | 0 | — | | 1 | 0 | 26 | 2 |
| Warrington Town | Total | | 148 | 17 | 10 | 1 | 0 | 0 | 19 | 2 | 167 | 21 |
| Career total | | | 183 | 20 | 14 | 2 | 0 | 0 | 21 | 2 | 218 | 25 |

== Honours ==
Warrington Town

- NPL Premier Division play-off winners: 2022–23
