= Aaron Skinner =

English footballer (born 2002)

Personal information
- Full name: Aaron William Skinner
- Date of birth: 24 May 2002 (age 24)
- Place of birth: Salford, England
- Height: 1.74 m (5 ft 9 in)
- Position: Defender

Team information
- Current team: Hereford
- Number: 2

Youth career
- 2014–2019: Bury
- 2019: Bolton Wanderers
- 2019–2021: Tottenham Hotspur

Senior career*
Years	Team	Apps	(Gls)
2021–2023	Bamber Bridge	64	(1)
2023–	Hereford	121	(11)
- * Club domestic league appearances and goals as of 08:18, 3 November 2026 (UTC)

Aaron William Skinner (born 24 May 2002) is an English footballer who plays a defender for National League North club Hereford.

== Career ==
Skinner began his early career with Bury. He was part of the under-18 team that reached the FA Youth Cup quarter-finals, appearing in the 1–5 defeat to Liverpool.

Following the closure of Bury's academy due to their expulsion from the Football League, in October 2019, Skinner joined Bolton Wanderers' academy. His stay at Bolton was short-lived however, as the following month he joined Tottenham Hotspur's academy. He signed his first professional contract with Tottenham on his 18th birthday.

In March 2021, Skinner went on trial at Sunderland. He was released by Tottenham in May 2021.

In November 2021, Skinner signed for Northern Premier League Premier Division club Bamber Bridge. He was named the club's player of the season at the end of the 2022–23 season.

On 24 May 2023, Skinner joined National League North club Hereford. He made his debut in their first home league fixture of the season. On 10 April 2024, it was announced that Skinner had signed a one-year contract extension, keeping him at the club until 2025. He was voted Hereford's player of the season. After an injury-hit 2024–25 season where he made 23 appearances across all competitions, he signed a new contract extension for the 2025–26 season in May 2025. On 4 June 2026, Skinner signed another extension until the end of the 2026–27 season, following being named the club's player of the season for the second time.

== Career statistics ==
As of match played 31 October 2026

Appearances and goals by club, season and competition
Club	Season	League			FA Cup		League Cup		Other		Total	
Club	Season	Division	Apps	Goals	Apps	Goals	Apps	Goals	Apps	Goals	Apps	Goals
Bamber Bridge	2021–22	NPL Premier Division	22	0	0	0	—		0	0	22	0
Bamber Bridge	2022–23	NPL Premier Division	42	1	3	0	—		4 (Note: One appearance, one goal in FA Trophy; one appearance, one goal in Lancashire FA Challenge Trophy; two appearances in Northern Premier League Premier Division play-offs)	2	49	3
Bamber Bridge	Total		64	1	3	0	0	0	4	2	71	3
Hereford	2023–24	National League North	43	1	4	0	—		4 (Note: Appearance(s) in FA Trophy)	1	51	2
Hereford	2024–25	National League North	21	1	2	0	—		0	0	23	1
Hereford	2025–26	National League North	43	5	3	0	—		3	0	49	5
Hereford	2026–27	National League North	14	4	1	0	—		0	0	15	4
Hereford	Total		121	11	10	0	0	0	7	1	138	12
Career total			185	12	13	0	0	0	11	3	209	15
