= 2018–19 West Midlands (Regional) League =

The 2018–19 West Midlands (Regional) League season was the 119th in the history of the West Midlands (Regional) League (WMRL), a football competition in England which was formed in 1889. The league operates three divisions: the Premier Division, see below, at level 10 in the English football league system, Division One at level 11, and Division Two. The Premier Division is one of three divisions which feed into the Midland League Premier Division, the other two being the East Midlands Counties League and the Midland League's own Division One.

The provisional constitution for Step 5 and Step 6 divisions for 2018–19 was announced by the FA on 25 May 2018; the WM(R)L constitution was later ratified by the league at its AGM.

== Premier Division ==
West Midlands League Premier Division
- Season: 2018–19
- Champions: Tividale
- Promoted: Haughmond; Tividale
- Matches: 380
- Goals: 1,481 (3.9 per match)

The Premier Division featured 16 clubs which competed in the division last season, along with four new clubs:

- Haughmond, relegated from the Midland League Premier Division
- Pershore Town, transferred from Midland League Division One
- Shawbury United, relegated from the Midland League Premier Division
- Wem Town, promoted from Division One

=== League table ===
Pos	Team	Pld	W	D	L	GF	GA	GD	Pts	Promotion or relegation
1	Tividale	38	29	4	5	133	32	+101	91	Promoted to the Midland League
2	Haughmond	38	28	3	7	118	38	+80	87	Promoted to the Midland League
3	Wolverhampton Casuals	38	25	7	6	111	44	+67	82	
4	Malvern Town	38	26	4	8	103	36	+67	82	Transferred to the Hellenic League
5	Wednesfield	38	24	6	8	86	54	+32	75 (Note: Wednesfield were deducted three points for fielding an ineligible player.)	
6	Bewdley Town	38	21	7	10	82	53	+29	70	
7	Hereford Lads Club	38	19	6	13	80	52	+28	63	Transferred to the Hellenic League
8	Black Country Rangers	38	18	6	14	88	79	+9	60	
9	Wellington	38	17	6	15	80	72	+8	57	Transferred to the Hellenic League
10	Dudley Town	38	15	9	14	72	70	+2	54	
11	Cradley Town	38	15	5	18	67	79	−12	50	
12	AFC Bridgnorth	38	13	9	16	64	75	−11	48	
13	Bilston Town	38	12	6	20	59	91	−32	42	
14	Pershore Town	38	11	6	21	66	100	−34	39	
15	Dudley Sports	38	9	10	19	50	91	−41	37	
16	Shawbury United	38	10	6	22	63	111	−48	36	
17	Smethwick Rangers	38	10	5	23	33	103	−70	35	
18	Wem Town	38	9	2	27	38	101	−63	29	
19	Shifnal Town	38	8	4	26	62	91	−29	28	
20	Pegasus Juniors	38	4	3	31	26	109	−83	15	Transferred to the Hellenic League

Source: FA Full-Time
Rules for classification: 1) Points; 2) Goal difference; 3) Number of goals scored; 4) Number of matches won; 5) Head-to-head results
