= 2016–17 West Midlands (Regional) League =

The 2016–17 West Midlands (Regional) League season was the 117th in the history of the West Midlands (Regional) League, an English association football competition for semi-professional and amateur teams based in the West Midlands county, Shropshire, Herefordshire, Worcestershire and southern Staffordshire. It has three divisions, the highest of which is the Premier Division, which sits at step 6 of the National League System, or the tenth level of the overall English football league system.

== Premier Division ==
West Midlands League Premier Division
- Season: 2016–17
- Champions: Haughmond
- Promoted: Haughmond
- Relegated: Gornal Athletic
- Matches: 380
- Goals: 1,630 (4.29 per match)

The Premier Division featured 19 clubs which competed in the division last season, along with one new club, promoted from Division One:

- Shifnal Town

=== League table ===
Pos	Team	Pld	W	D	L	GF	GA	GD	Pts	Promotion or relegation
1	Haughmond	38	32	3	3	135	42	+93	99	Promoted to the Midland League
2	Wolverhampton Casuals	38	27	3	8	122	69	+53	84	
3	Wolverhampton Sporting Community	38	24	10	4	122	43	+79	81 (Note: Wolverhampton Sporting Community were deducted one point for fielding a suspended player against Hinkley in the FA Vase on 22 October 2016.)	
4	Malvern Town	38	25	4	9	120	56	+64	79	
5	Wellington	38	20	8	10	95	65	+30	68	
6	Bewdley Town	38	20	6	12	119	82	+37	66	
7	Ellesmere Rangers	38	20	5	13	97	78	+19	65	
8	AFC Bridgnorth	38	17	4	17	66	76	−10	55	
9	Pegasus Juniors	38	17	3	18	85	74	+11	54	
10	Cradley Town	38	16	5	17	76	69	+7	53	
11	Shifnal Town	38	15	8	15	76	76	0	53	
12	Stone Old Alleynians	38	12	13	13	70	64	+6	49	
13	Black Country Rangers	38	13	10	15	73	72	+1	49	
14	Willenhall Town	38	15	3	20	76	98	−22	48	Demoted to Division One
15	Bilston Town	38	12	7	19	73	90	−17	43	
16	Smethwick Rangers	38	12	4	22	53	91	−38	40	
17	Dudley Sports	38	9	7	22	49	92	−43	34	
18	Dudley Town	38	9	4	25	52	114	−62	31	
19	Wellington Amateurs	38	7	2	29	44	149	−105	23	
20	Gornal Athletic	38	2	3	33	27	130	−103	9	Relegated to Division One

Source: FA Full-Time
Rules for classification: 1) Points; 2) Goal difference; 3) Number of goals scored; 4) Number of matches won; 5) Head-to-head results
