= 2022–23 Northern Premier League =

The 2022–23 season was the 55th season of the Northern Premier League. The league consists of four divisions, the Premier Division at Step 3 of the National League System, and the West, East and Midlands divisions at Step 4. The NPL continued this season with main sponsors Entain's Pitching In.

The allocations for Step 4 this season were announced by The Football Association (FA) on 12 May 2022.

== Premier Division ==
Northern Premier League Premier Division
- Season: 2022–23
- Champions: South Shields
- Promoted: South Shields; Warrington Town
- Relegated: Nantwich Town; Stalybridge Celtic; Liversedge; Belper Town

=== Team changes ===
The following 6 clubs left the Premier Division before the season:

- Basford United – transferred to the Southern League Premier Division Central
- Buxton – promoted to the National League North
- Grantham Town – relegated to Division One East
- Scarborough Athletic – promoted to the National League North
- Mickleover – transferred to the Southern League Premier Division Central
- Witton Albion – relegated to Division One West

The following 6 clubs joined the division before the season:

- Belper Town – promoted from Division One Midlands
- Guiseley – relegated from the National League North
- Liversedge – promoted from Division One East
- Marine – promoted from Division One West
- Marske United – promoted from Division One East
- Warrington Rylands 1906 – promoted from Division One West

=== Premier Division table ===
Pos	Team	Pld	W	D	L	GF	GA	GD	Pts	Promotion, qualification or relegation
1	South Shields (C, P)	42	25	10	7	71	39	+32	85	Promotion to the National League North
2	Warrington Town (O, P)	42	21	14	7	70	39	+31	77	Qualification for the play-offs (Note: Four teams played for one spot and promotion to the National League North.)
3	Bamber Bridge	42	22	7	13	62	63	−1	73	Qualification for the play-offs
4	Gainsborough Trinity	42	18	15	9	74	41	+33	69	Qualification for the play-offs
5	Matlock Town	42	19	11	12	56	49	+7	68	Qualification for the play-offs
6	Hyde United	42	18	12	12	64	42	+22	66	
7	Radcliffe	42	17	15	10	55	49	+6	66	
8	FC United of Manchester	42	19	9	14	68	48	+20	63 (Note: FC United of Manchester were deducted three points for fielding 6 loan players.)	
9	Marine	42	17	10	15	56	45	+11	61	
10	Warrington Rylands 1906	42	17	9	16	64	55	+9	60	
11	Lancaster City	42	15	13	14	51	51	0	58	
12	Stafford Rangers	42	15	12	15	52	53	−1	57	
13	Guiseley	42	16	7	19	54	54	0	55	
14	Ashton United	42	16	8	18	58	64	−6	53 (Note: Ashton United were deducted three points for playing two ineligible players.)	
15	Whitby Town	42	14	10	18	45	54	−9	52	
16	Marske United	42	15	5	22	57	79	−22	50	
17	Morpeth Town	42	14	7	21	55	63	−8	49	
18	Atherton Collieries	42	11	14	17	38	57	−19	47	
19	Nantwich Town (R)	42	12	10	20	44	55	−11	46	Relegation to Division One West
20	Stalybridge Celtic (R)	42	10	12	20	50	64	−14	42	Relegation to Division One West
21	Liversedge (R)	42	11	7	24	48	86	−38	40	Relegation to Division One East
22	Belper Town (R)	42	7	9	26	44	86	−42	30	Relegation to Division One East

Source: NPL official site
Rules for classification: 1) points; 2) goal difference; 3) number of goals scored; 4) number of matches won; 5) head-to-head results
(C) Champions; (O) Play-off winners; (P) Promoted; (R) Relegated

=== Top goalscorers ===
Rank	Player	Club	Goals
1	(Jamaica) Clayton Donaldson	Gainsborough Trinity	22
2	(England) Regan Linney	F.C. United of Manchester	20
3	(England) Adam Boyes	Marske United	18
3	(England) Fin Sinclair-Smith	Bamber Bridge	18
5	(England) Liam Waldock	Gainsborough Trinity	17
6	(England) Callum Dolan	Warrington Rylands	14
7	(Jersey) Sol Solomon	Marine	13
8	(England) Darius Osei	South Shields	12
8	(England) Jack Redshaw	Hyde United	12

=== Results table ===
Home \ Away	ASH	ATH	BAM	BEL	UOM	GAI	GUI	HYD	LNC	LIV	MAR	MSK	MAT	MOR	NAN	RAD	SOU	STA	STL	WRY	WAR	WHI
Ashton United	—	3–0	3–0	3–1	0–5	2–3	2–0	0–6	2–4	1–2	1–1	1–2	0–1	1–0	0–1	1–2	1–1	1–1	2–1	3–1	2–1	0–1
Atherton Collieries	2–0	—	0–3	1–1	1–0	1–1	2–1	0–1	1–1	0–4	0–1	2–0	0–1	1–1	2–0	1–1	0–2	1–2	1–1	2–0	1–1	1–3
Bamber Bridge	1–2	2–0	—	5–1	2–1	1–1	2–1	1–0	2–1	2–2	1–1	2–2	5–1	1–0	1–0	1–3	2–1	2–1	1–1	1–0	3–2	2–1
Belper Town	0–4	2–0	0–2	—	1–4	1–4	1–3	1–1	1–2	1–2	1–2	0–1	1–1	1–2	1–3	1–1	0–1	2–1	2–0	0–5	1–1	2–2
FC United of Manchester	4–0	1–2	5–2	2–0	—	1–3	1–0	4–4	1–1	2–3	1–1	2–1	2–1	4–2	0–0	1–2	2–1	0–1	1–1	2–2	1–1	2–2
Gainsborough Trinity	2–0	2–2	1–2	2–2	1–2	—	1–1	1–1	0–2	4–0	1–0	6–2	3–0	1–1	0–1	2–2	1–1	0–0	4–0	2–0	1–1	0–1
Guiseley	1–2	3–0	0–1	0–1	2–1	0–1	—	2–3	0–0	1–0	0–3	1–3	2–1	1–0	2–1	1–3	1–0	4–0	1–1	1–1	1–3	2–1
Hyde United	0–1	1–1	7–0	2–0	1–0	1–0	2–1	—	1–2	4–2	4–0	1–0	0–1	1–2	1–0	1–1	0–1	1–0	0–1	0–1	2–2	0–0
Lancaster City	1–0	0–0	1–1	1–1	2–0	1–2	2–1	2–1	—	0–0	1–3	2–0	2–1	2–1	1–1	0–0	0–2	1–2	1–1	2–1	0–1	2–0
Liversedge	0–1	0–1	1–2	1–3	0–4	1–0	2–1	1–3	1–1	—	1–0	0–1	0–2	1–4	3–3	1–1	0–1	3–3	0–1	2–5	0–4	0–3
Marine	1–1	4–0	2–3	2–1	3–0	0–2	1–3	0–0	0–0	5–0	—	1–0	0–1	4–2	0–3	0–1	2–2	1–0	1–0	1–3	1–2	2–0
Marske United	2–1	2–3	1–2	3–1	0–2	0–3	2–4	0–2	2–3	2–2	0–1	—	2–1	2–1	2–2	0–2	0–4	3–2	4–2	2–0	1–2	0–0
Matlock Town	1–1	1–0	1–0	4–0	1–0	1–1	0–1	1–1	1–0	1–2	3–2	4–1	—	2–2	1–1	2–2	0–0	3–1	1–1	4–2	0–0	1–0
Morpeth Town	3–1	3–0	1–1	0–2	0–1	2–0	1–3	3–0	6–3	0–2	0–2	1–1	2–0	—	2–1	0–1	0–1	2–1	3–2	3–3	0–4	0–1
Nantwich Town	1–2	2–1	0–1	1–0	0–2	1–1	0–1	0–1	2–1	0–1	1–2	1–2	0–1	3–0	—	2–1	0–1	1–1	0–4	2–2	1–1	0–2
Radcliffe	1–1	0–2	2–0	4–2	1–0	1–1	4–2	1–0	2–2	2–0	1–1	2–4	1–0	3–1	1–2	—	1–2	0–0	2–1	0–3	0–3	1–1
South Shields	3–3	0–0	5–0	2–1	1–2	1–1	2–1	0–1	2–0	5–2	2–1	4–2	1–1	1–0	3–2	0–0	—	2–0	2–0	1–0	2–1	4–2
Stafford Rangers	1–1	1–2	4–2	1–2	1–0	3–4	1–1	1–1	2–1	2–0	2–1	2–0	0–2	0–0	3–0	1–0	3–0	—	0–3	2–2	1–1	1–0
Stalybridge Celtic	1–4	3–3	1–0	2–1	1–2	2–0	0–0	2–2	1–0	4–2	0–0	2–3	2–3	0–3	1–2	1–2	3–3	0–2	—	1–2	0–1	0–1
Warrington Rylands 1906	0–3	0–0	2–0	3–1	0–0	0–3	2–1	2–4	2–1	1–0	1–0	3–0	1–2	2–0	0–1	4–0	0–1	1–1	1–0	—	1–2	2–0
Warrington Town	3–0	1–1	1–0	3–1	0–1	0–2	0–0	3–1	2–0	3–1	0–0	0–1	3–1	2–0	2–1	1–0	3–2	2–0	1–1	3–3	—	2–2
Whitby Town	2–1	1–0	3–0	2–2	0–2	0–6	0–2	1–1	1–2	2–3	0–3	2–1	4–1	0–1	1–1	0–0	0–1	0–1	0–1	1–0	2–1	—

Source: NPL official site
Legend: Blue = home team win; Yellow = draw; Red = away team win.

=== Play-offs ===
Semifinals
2	Warrington Town	4
5	Matlock Town	1
3	Bamber Bridge	1 (5)
4	Gainsborough Trinity	1 (3)

Final
2	Warrington Town	1
3	Bamber Bridge	0

Semi-finals

25 April 2023	Warrington Town	4–1	Matlock Town	Warrington
19:45	Duffy 13', 36'; Dixon 29'; Woods 40'	Report	Abbott 85'	Stadium: Cantilever Park; Attendance: 1,897; Referee: Oliver Noonan

25 April 2023	Bamber Bridge	1–1 (a.e.t.) (5–3 p)	Gainsborough Trinity	Bamber Bridge
19:45	Turner 22'	Report	Durose 42'	Stadium: Sir Tom Finney Stadium; Attendance: 1,215; Referee: Declan Brown
	Penalties
	Dawson (penalty scored); Sinclair-Smith (penalty scored); Cross-Adair (penalty scored); Skinner (penalty scored); Wilson (penalty scored)		Donaldson (penalty scored); Waldock (penalty scored); Preston (penalty scored); Rice (penalty missed)

Final

1 May 2023	Warrington Town	1–0	Bamber Bridge	Warrington
15:00	Buckley-Ricketts 90'	Report		Stadium: Cantilever Park; Attendance: 2,550; Referee: Lewis Dawson

=== Stadia and locations ===
2022–23 Premier Division teams
Locations of Northern Premier League 2022–23 Premier Division teams (Greater Manchester)

Club	Location	Ground	Capacity
Ashton United	Ashton-under-Lyne	Hurst Cross	4,500
Atherton Collieries	Atherton	Alder Street	2,500
Bamber Bridge	Bamber Bridge	Irongate	2,264
Belper Town	Belper	Christchurch Meadow	2,650
FC United of Manchester	Manchester (Moston)	Broadhurst Park	4,400
Gainsborough Trinity	Gainsborough	The Northolme	4,304
Guiseley	Guiseley	Nethermoor Park	4,200
Hyde United	Hyde	Ewen Fields	4,250
Lancaster City	Lancaster	Giant Axe	3,500
Liversedge	Cleckheaton	Clayborn	2,000
Marine	Crosby	Rossett Park	3,185
Marske United	Marske-by-the-Sea	Mount Pleasant	2,500
Matlock Town	Matlock	Causeway Lane	2,214
Morpeth Town	Morpeth	Craik Park	1,500
Nantwich Town	Nantwich	The Weaver Stadium	3,500
Radcliffe	Radcliffe	Stainton Park	3,500
South Shields	South Shields	1st Cloud Arena	3,500
Stafford Rangers	Stafford	Marston Road	4,000
Stalybridge Celtic	Stalybridge	Bower Fold	6,500
Warrington Rylands 1906	Warrington	Gorsey Lane	1,345
Warrington Town	Warrington	Cantilever Park	3,500
Whitby Town	Whitby	Turnbull Ground	3,500

== Division One East ==
Northern Premier League Division One East
- Season: 2022–23
- Champions: Worksop Town
- Promoted: Worksop Town; Long Eaton United
- Relegated: North Shields (demoted); Lincoln United; Shildon; Tadcaster Albion

Division One East comprises 20 teams, one more than the previous season.

=== Team changes ===
The following 5 clubs left Division One East before the season:

- Frickley Athletic – relegated to the Northern Counties East League Premier Division
- Liversedge – promoted to the Premier Division
- Marske United – promoted to the Premier Division
- Pickering Town – relegated to the Northern League Division One
- Yorkshire Amateur – relegated to the Northern Counties East League Premier Division

The following 6 clubs joined the division before the season:

- Carlton Town – transferred from Division One Midlands
- Consett – promoted from the Northern League Division One
- Grantham Town – relegated from the Premier Division
- Grimsby Borough – promoted from the Northern Counties East League Premier Division
- Long Eaton United – promoted from the United Counties League Premier Division North
- North Shields – promoted from the Northern League Division One

=== Division One East table ===
Pos	Team	Pld	W	D	L	GF	GA	GD	Pts	Promotion, qualification or relegation
1	Worksop Town (C, P)	38	31	6	1	112	25	+87	99	Promotion to the Premier Division
2	Stockton Town	38	20	8	10	74	40	+34	68	Qualification for the play-offs
3	Hebburn Town	38	20	6	12	59	58	+1	66	Qualification for the play-offs
4	Long Eaton United (O, P)	38	19	8	11	67	52	+15	65	Qualification for the play-offs
5	Stocksbridge Park Steels	38	19	6	13	58	41	+17	63	Qualification for the play-offs
6	Dunston	38	16	12	10	63	50	+13	60	
7	North Shields (D)	38	14	11	13	50	45	+5	53	Relegation to the Northern League
8	Brighouse Town	38	15	6	17	65	64	+1	51	
9	Sheffield	38	13	11	14	51	58	−7	50	
10	Pontefract Collieries	38	12	13	13	68	62	+6	49	
11	Cleethorpes Town	38	13	10	15	48	51	−3	49	
12	Grimsby Borough	38	13	10	15	54	60	−6	49	
13	Consett	38	12	10	16	54	63	−9	46	
14	Bridlington Town	38	11	13	14	45	65	−20	46	
15	Ossett United	38	10	14	14	46	55	−9	44	
16	Grantham Town	38	10	13	15	37	42	−5	43	
17	Carlton Town	38	12	6	20	45	69	−24	42	
18	Lincoln United (R)	38	10	11	17	54	70	−16	41	Qualification for the inter-step play-off
19	Shildon (R)	38	11	7	20	46	70	−24	40	Relegation to the Northern League
20	Tadcaster Albion (R)	38	4	9	25	28	84	−56	21	Relegation to the Northern Counties East League

Source: NPL official site
Rules for classification: 1) points; 2) goal difference; 3) number of goals scored; 4) number of matches won; 5) head-to-head results
(C) Champions; (D) Disqualified; (O) Play-off winners; (P) Promoted; (R) Relegated

=== Top goalscorers ===
Rank	Player	Club	Goals
1	(England) Liam Hughes	Worksop Town	33
2	(England) Jamie Walker	Long Eaton United	20
3	(Gibraltar) Adam Priestley	Pontefract Collieries	17
4	(England) Amar Purewal	Hebburn Town	15
5	(England) Matthew Cotton	Lincoln United	14
5	(Wales) Declan Howe	Cleethorpes Town	14
7	(England) Kevin Hayes	Stockton Town	13

=== Results table ===
Home \ Away	BRD	BRI	CAR	CLE	CON	DUN	GRA	GRI	HEB	LIN	LOE	NSH	OSS	PON	SHE	SHI	STB	STC	TAD	WOR
Bridlington Town	—	1–0	0–0	0–3	0–0	1–2	0–0	1–0	1–2	1–3	1–1	2–1	2–2	0–5	1–1	1–1	1–0	1–0	2–0	2–2
Brighouse Town	2–3	—	4–1	1–2	2–0	1–2	1–3	2–0	1–3	2–2	1–4	2–2	2–1	6–0	1–1	3–0	2–3	0–2	3–0	0–6
Carlton Town	2–4	2–4	—	1–1	2–1	2–0	0–2	0–2	0–2	1–4	2–0	1–2	0–2	1–0	2–4	0–2	1–3	0–2	1–1	0–3
Cleethorpes Town	1–0	0–2	2–3	—	2–1	0–1	3–1	0–0	1–1	5–0	2–1	1–1	2–0	1–4	3–0	1–2	0–2	0–2	2–1	0–2
Consett	2–3	1–4	5–0	3–2	—	2–1	2–2	1–3	0–2	4–2	0–3	0–0	1–1	3–1	3–0	1–0	1–2	3–4	2–1	1–2
Dunston	1–1	4–0	1–3	3–2	4–2	—	1–1	2–1	0–1	3–1	0–2	1–1	3–3	3–3	2–0	2–1	2–3	1–1	4–1	1–1
Grantham Town	1–0	3–0	0–1	0–1	3–0	0–0	—	0–3	0–1	3–3	0–1	1–0	0–4	0–0	2–3	3–1	0–1	1–1	2–0	0–1
Grimsby Borough	5–2	3–5	1–2	0–0	2–2	1–0	3–1	—	0–1	3–3	1–3	0–5	0–1	2–0	1–4	2–3	1–1	1–1	1–0	2–2
Hebburn Town	2–0	1–0	0–2	3–1	5–1	1–1	2–2	0–4	—	0–2	1–4	2–1	1–1	2–1	2–1	1–0	1–3	2–0	5–3	1–6
Lincoln United	1–3	1–1	1–0	1–1	0–1	2–1	0–1	0–2	3–1	—	3–1	0–1	1–1	2–2	3–3	1–2	1–0	1–2	4–0	0–1
Long Eaton United	2–2	3–0	1–1	3–0	1–1	2–3	1–1	1–4	3–2	2–1	—	3–1	0–2	2–1	0–1	4–1	2–1	1–1	1–0	0–1
North Shields	1–2	0–0	2–1	0–0	1–0	1–1	2–0	3–0	1–2	1–1	1–0	—	1–1	3–0	1–0	1–2	0–3	1–1	2–1	2–3
Ossett United	2–1	0–4	1–2	1–2	1–1	0–2	0–0	3–1	0–1	1–1	0–3	0–3	—	2–2	0–3	1–1	1–0	0–3	4–1	1–2
Pontefract Collieries	1–1	2–1	2–2	2–2	1–1	2–1	0–0	4–0	1–1	3–1	1–2	0–2	3–1	—	2–2	3–0	2–3	2–1	6–2	0–2
Sheffield	1–1	1–0	0–0	0–0	1–1	0–2	1–3	0–1	2–1	2–1	3–2	2–0	2–3	3–3	—	2–0	1–1	2–1	1–1	1–3
Shildon	6–0	1–2	0–4	3–1	1–3	0–2	1–0	1–1	1–2	1–1	2–2	2–3	1–0	0–0	1–2	—	3–2	0–3	3–1	1–4
Stocksbridge Park Steels	3–0	1–1	2–0	3–0	0–1	2–2	1–0	0–0	4–1	2–3	0–1	1–1	1–3	2–0	1–0	2–0	—	1–2	1–0	0–2
Stockton Town	4–0	1–2	4–3	1–0	1–2	1–2	1–1	1–1	2–1	5–0	1–2	4–2	1–1	2–3	6–0	2–1	1–0	—	5–0	2–1
Tadcaster Albion	3–2	0–3	0–2	2–4	0–0	1–1	0–0	0–2	1–1	1–0	2–2	1–0	0–0	0–4	2–1	1–1	0–2	0–2	—	0–4
Worksop Town	2–2	4–0	4–0	0–0	3–1	3–1	2–0	5–0	4–1	6–0	7–1	4–0	1–1	3–2	1–0	6–0	4–1	1–0	4–1	—

Source: NPL official site
Legend: Blue = home team win; Yellow = draw; Red = away team win.

=== Play-offs ===
Semifinals
2	Stockton Town	2 (4)
5	Stocksbridge Park Steels	2 (3)
3	Hebburn Town	2 (2)
4	Long Eaton United	2 (3)

Final
2	Stockton Town	2 (3)
4	Long Eaton United	2 (4)

Semi-finals

25 April 2023	Stockton Town	2–2 (4–3 p)	Stocksbridge Park Steels	Stockton-on-Tees
19:45	Mulligan 8'; Painter 26'	Report	Goodwin 57'; Ofoegbu 59'	Stadium: Bishopton Road West; Attendance: 1,227

25 April 2023	Hebburn Town	2–2 (2–3 p)	Long Eaton United	Hebburn
19:45	Spence 66'; Moore 90'	Report	Walker 14', 45'	Stadium: Hebburn Sports & Social Ground; Attendance: 631; Referee: Jamie Cann

Final

29 April 2023	Stockton Town	2–2 (3–4 p)	Long Eaton United	Stockton-on-Tees
15:00	Mulligan 47'; Tymon 78'	Report	Marshall 25'; Cox 81'	Stadium: Bishopton Road West; Attendance: 1,800
	Penalties
	Butterworth (penalty scored); King (penalty missed); McWilliams (penalty missed); Hayes (penalty scored); Roberts (penalty scored)		Marshall (penalty scored); Cursons (penalty scored); Parker (penalty missed); Cox (penalty scored); Walker (penalty scored)

Inter-step play-off

29 April 2023	Lincoln United	1–2	Avro	Lincoln
15:00	Cotton 42' (pen.)	Report	Bentham 30'; Morrow 54'	Stadium: Ashby Avenue; Attendance: 410; Referee: Sam Wesson

=== Stadia and locations ===
Locations of Northern Premier League 2022–23 Division One East teams

Team	Location	Stadium	Capacity
Bridlington Town	Bridlington	Queensgate	3,000
Brighouse Town	Brighouse	St Giles Road	1,000
Carlton Town	Carlton	Bill Stokeld Stadium	1,500
Cleethorpes Town	Grimsby	Clee Road	1,000
Consett	Consett	Belle View Stadium	3,770
Dunston	Dunston	Wellington Road	2,500
Grantham Town	Grantham	South Kesteven Sports Stadium	7,500
Grimsby Borough	Grimsby	Bradley Football Centre	1,000
Hebburn Town	Hebburn	The Green Energy Sports Ground	–
Lincoln United	Lincoln	Ashby Avenue	2,200
Long Eaton United	Long Eaton	Grange Park	3,000
North Shields	North Shields	Daren Persson Stadium	1,500
Ossett United	Ossett	Ingfield	1,950
Pontefract Collieries	Pontefract	Harratt Nissan Stadium	1,200
Sheffield	Dronfield	Coach and Horses Ground	2,089
Shildon	Shildon	Dean Street	4,700
Stocksbridge Park Steels	Stocksbridge	Bracken Moor	3,500
Stockton Town	Stockton	Bishopton Road West	1,800
Tadcaster Albion	Tadcaster	Ings Lane	2,000
Worksop Town	Worksop	Sandy Lane	2,500

== Division One Midlands ==
Northern Premier League Division One Midlands
- Season: 2022–23
- Champions: Stamford
- Promoted: Stamford; Halesowen Town
- Relegated: Dereham Town; St Neots Town; Daventry Town; Yaxley

=== Team changes ===
The following 6 clubs left Division One Midlands before the season:

- Belper Town – promoted to the Premier Division
- Carlton Town – transferred to Division One East
- Histon – relegated to the United Counties League Premier Division South
- Ilkeston Town – promoted to the Southern League Premier Division Central
- Soham Town Rangers – relegated to the Eastern Counties League Premier Division
- Wisbech Town – relegated to the United Counties League Premier Division South

The following 6 clubs joined the division before the season:

- Boldmere St Michaels – promoted from the Midland League Premier Division
- Dereham Town – transferred from the Isthmian League North Division
- Gresley Rovers – promoted from the United Counties League Premier Division North
- Harborough Town – promoted from the United Counties League Premier Division South
- Hinckley LRFC – promoted from the United Counties League Premier Division South
- St Neots Town – transferred from the Southern League Division One Central

=== Division One Midlands table ===
Pos	Team	Pld	W	D	L	GF	GA	GD	Pts	Promotion, qualification or relegation
1	Stamford (C, P)	38	27	6	5	76	31	+45	87	Promotion to the Southern League Premier Central
2	Halesowen Town (O, P)	38	24	6	8	80	40	+40	78	Qualification for the play-offs
3	Spalding United	38	22	9	7	68	28	+40	75	Qualification for the play-offs
4	Sporting Khalsa	38	21	7	10	84	48	+36	70	Qualification for the play-offs
5	Coleshill Town	38	21	6	11	68	39	+29	69	Qualification for the play-offs
6	Chasetown	38	20	8	10	58	27	+31	68	Transfer to Division One West
7	Corby Town	38	19	10	9	71	48	+23	67	
8	Harborough Town	38	20	7	11	71	50	+21	67	
9	Boldmere St Michaels	38	19	7	12	65	51	+14	64	
10	Loughborough Dynamo	38	14	10	14	55	50	+5	52	
11	Shepshed Dynamo	38	15	6	17	55	47	+8	51	
12	Sutton Coldfield Town	38	14	5	19	56	60	−4	47	
13	Hinckley LRFC	38	11	11	16	37	40	−3	44	
14	Cambridge City	38	11	11	16	43	51	−8	44	
15	Bedworth United	38	9	15	14	37	45	−8	42	
16	Gresley Rovers	38	11	8	19	34	58	−24	41	
17	Dereham Town (R)	38	10	5	23	43	79	−36	35	Qualification for the inter-step play-offs
18	St Neots Town (R)	38	8	8	22	41	87	−46	32	Qualification for the inter-step play-offs
19	Daventry Town (R)	38	6	6	26	30	100	−70	24	Relegation to the United Counties League
20	Yaxley (R)	38	1	3	34	23	116	−93	6	Relegation to the United Counties League

Source: NPL official site
Rules for classification: 1) points; 2) goal difference; 3) number of goals scored; 4) number of matches won; 5) head-to-head results
(C) Champions; (O) Play-off winners; (P) Promoted; (R) Relegated

=== Top goalscorers ===
Rank	Player	Club	Goals
1	(England) Jonny Margetts	Stamford	33
2	(England) Kai Tonge	Coleshill Town	30
3	(England) Miracle Okafor	Sporting Khalsa	26
4	(England) Richard Gregory	Halesowen Town	19
5	(England) Trey Charles	St Neots Town	17
5	(Antigua and Barbuda) Zayn Hakeem	Shepshed Dynamo	17
7	(England) Simeon Cobourne	Halesowen Town	16
8	(England) Rhys Hilton	Sutton Coldfield Town	15
8	(England) Jack Langston	Chasetown	15

=== Results table ===
Home \ Away	BED	BSM	CAM	CHA	COL	COR	DAV	DER	GRE	HAL	HAR	HLR	LOU	SHE	SPA	SPO	STN	STA	SUT	YAX
Bedworth United	—	1–2	2–2	0–0	1–0	3–3	0–0	1–1	3–0	1–1	0–0	1–0	1–2	1–1	0–0	0–2	2–1	0–2	0–2	2–1
Boldmere St Michaels	2–1	—	3–1	1–5	2–2	0–4	2–1	3–1	2–0	1–0	0–1	2–0	1–1	1–3	1–1	1–1	5–1	0–1	3–0	5–1
Cambridge City	0–0	1–1	—	0–4	2–3	2–0	1–1	1–2	3–0	1–2	0–3	1–1	2–1	1–4	0–0	1–1	1–1	1–2	0–1	2–1
Chasetown	2–1	0–1	0–1	—	0–2	1–1	1–0	2–0	3–0	0–0	0–0	1–0	3–0	1–0	1–0	2–0	4–0	1–2	3–1	4–0
Coleshill Town	1–0	2–0	1–2	1–1	—	0–0	3–2	3–0	2–0	3–2	2–4	2–1	3–1	0–2	1–1	1–0	4–0	3–1	3–0	2–0
Corby Town	1–1	3–2	1–1	0–4	1–0	—	2–1	3–0	2–2	4–2	0–4	1–0	0–2	0–0	1–0	2–2	4–0	1–1	3–1	4–1
Daventry Town	0–1	0–2	0–4	1–2	0–4	0–7	—	2–0	3–2	1–4	0–2	0–0	0–4	3–2	0–9	0–7	1–1	1–2	0–1	3–0
Dereham Town	0–2	0–3	1–0	2–3	1–4	0–1	6–0	—	2–0	0–3	3–2	1–1	1–1	0–3	0–2	1–3	0–1	1–3	3–2	6–2
Gresley Rovers	1–0	1–0	0–0	1–0	1–0	0–3	2–0	1–0	—	2–3	2–2	2–2	0–2	2–0	0–2	0–2	1–2	0–0	4–2	4–0
Halesowen Town	2–0	2–3	2–1	1–0	2–0	3–2	4–0	4–0	3–0	—	1–0	3–0	3–2	0–1	3–0	2–2	3–0	0–0	0–3	3–0
Harborough Town	2–2	4–2	1–0	1–0	2–2	1–0	2–1	6–1	1–0	1–3	—	1–0	3–0	2–1	0–2	2–3	1–1	0–2	2–1	9–1
Hinckley LRFC	1–0	2–1	2–0	0–1	4–1	0–1	1–0	2–1	4–0	2–2	0–0	—	1–1	0–1	1–1	1–2	1–1	0–1	3–0	2–1
Loughborough Dynamo	4–1	0–1	1–1	1–0	1–1	2–3	2–2	1–2	0–0	0–2	2–3	1–1	—	2–0	0–4	2–1	3–1	3–1	1–0	4–0
Shepshed Dynamo	1–1	2–0	0–1	1–2	0–2	0–3	3–0	2–2	0–1	3–4	1–2	0–1	2–0	—	0–2	3–0	3–1	0–2	3–0	1–1
Spalding United	2–2	2–2	0–2	3–2	0–1	2–2	3–0	2–0	4–0	3–0	3–1	0–1	0–0	1–0	—	2–0	1–0	3–2	1–0	4–2
Sporting Khalsa	0–0	2–2	1–2	1–1	1–0	4–1	7–1	5–0	1–0	0–5	5–1	3–1	1–0	1–3	2–1	—	2–0	0–2	2–1	8–0
St Neots Town	0–4	0–2	3–2	1–1	2–1	2–0	1–2	1–3	1–1	1–3	1–0	3–0	1–3	3–3	0–3	2–4	—	1–3	1–3	4–1
Stamford	2–0	2–1	3–1	3–2	2–1	2–0	4–0	1–1	1–1	2–1	3–1	1–0	2–0	3–0	1–2	3–1	4–0	—	0–3	3–0
Sutton Coldfield Town	4–0	1–2	2–0	0–0	0–3	1–5	2–2	3–0	1–0	1–1	2–3	2–1	2–2	1–2	0–1	2–3	6–0	1–1	—	2–1
Yaxley	0–2	1–3	0–2	0–1	0–4	1–2	0–2	0–1	2–3	0–1	3–1	0–0	0–3	0–4	0–1	0–4	2–2	0–6	1–2	—

Source: NPL official site
Legend: Blue = home team win; Yellow = draw; Red = away team win.

=== Play-offs ===
Semifinals
2	Halesowen Town	3
5	Coleshill Town	1
3	Spalding United	2
4	Sporting Khalsa	1

Final
2	Halesowen Town	2
3	Spalding United	1

Semi-finals

25 April 2023	Halesowen Town	3–1	Coleshill Town	Halesowen
19:45	Manning 3'; Gregory 18' (pen.); Cobourne 87'	Report	Williams 25'	Stadium: The Grove; Attendance: 2,334; Referee: Harry Tarrant

25 April 2023	Spalding United	2–1	Sporting Khalsa	Spalding
19:45	Edge 64'; Clifton 76'		Okafor 20'	Stadium: Sir Halley Stewart Field; Attendance: 690; Referee: Daniel Smith

Final

29 April 2023	Halesowen Town	2–1 (a.e.t.)	Spalding United	Halesowen
15:00	Donnelly 90'; Insall 112'	Report	Stainfield 39'	Stadium: The Grove; Attendance: 3,250; Referee: Elliot Bell

Inter-step play-offs

29 April 2023	Dereham Town	0–2	Stotfold	Dereham
15:00		Report	Alleyne 5', 31'	Stadium: Aldiss Park; Attendance: 287

29 April 2023	St Neots Town	1–6	Lye Town	St Neots
15:00	Anderson 78'	Report	Meacham 2'; Hesson 20', 53', 88'; Palmer 62', 74'	Stadium: New Rowley Park; Attendance: 548

=== Stadia and locations ===
Locations of Northern Premier League 2022–23 Division One Midlands teams
Location of Northern Premier League 2022–23 Division One Midlands team (Norfolk)

Team	Location	Stadium	Capacity
Bedworth United	Bedworth	The Oval	3,000
Boldmere St Michaels	Boldmere	Trevor Brown Memorial Ground	2,000
Cambridge City	Impington	Bridge Road (Impington)	4,300
Chasetown	Burntwood	The Scholars Ground	3,000
Coleshill Town	Coleshill	Pack Meadow	2,000
Corby Town	Corby	Steel Park	3,893
Daventry Town	Daventry	Elderstubbs	1,855
Dereham Town	Dereham	Aldiss Park	3,000
Gresley Rovers	Church Gresley	Moat Ground	2,400
Halesowen Town	Halesowen	The Grove	3,150
Harborough Town	Market Harborough	Bowden Park	–
Hinckley LRFC	Hinckley	Leicester Road Stadium	4,329
Loughborough Dynamo	Loughborough	Nanpantan Sports Ground	1,500
Shepshed Dynamo	Leicestershire	The Dovecote Stadium	2,500
Spalding United	Spalding	Sir Halley Stewart Field	3,500
Sporting Khalsa	Willenhall	Guardian Warehousing Arena	–
Stamford	Stamford	Borderville Sports Centre	2,000
St Neots Town	St Neots	New Rowley Park	3,500
Sutton Coldfield Town	Sutton Coldfield	Central Ground	2,000
Yaxley	Yaxley	Leading Drove	1,000

== Division One West ==
Northern Premier League Division One West
- Season: 2022–23
- Champions: Macclesfield (1st title)
- Promoted: Macclesfield; Workington
- Relegated: Skelmersdale United; Glossop North End; Colne; Ramsbottom United

=== Team changes ===
The following 4 clubs left Division One West before the season:

- Kendal Town – relegated to the North West Counties League Premier Division
- Marine – promoted to the Premier Division
- Market Drayton Town – relegated to the Midland Football League Premier Division
- Warrington Rylands 1906 – promoted to the Premier Division

The following 4 clubs joined the division before the season:

- Hanley Town – promoted from the Midland League Premier Division
- Macclesfield – promoted from the North West Counties League Premier Division
- Skelmersdale United – promoted from the North West Counties League Premier Division
- Witton Albion – relegated from the Premier Division

=== Division One West table ===
Pos	Team	Pld	W	D	L	GF	GA	GD	Pts	Promotion, qualification or relegation
1	Macclesfield (C, P)	38	28	6	4	95	27	+68	90	Promotion to the Premier Division
2	Leek Town	38	23	7	8	70	38	+32	76	Qualification for the play-offs
3	Workington (O, P)	38	23	6	9	71	39	+32	75	Qualification for the play-offs
4	Clitheroe	38	19	7	12	70	50	+20	64	Qualification for the play-offs
5	Runcorn Linnets	38	18	9	11	58	38	+20	63	Qualification for the play-offs
6	Witton Albion	38	16	11	11	61	50	+11	59	
7	Mossley	38	16	10	12	58	49	+9	58	
8	Kidsgrove Athletic	38	13	12	13	49	55	−6	51	
9	Prescot Cables	38	13	11	14	50	51	−1	50	
10	Trafford	38	14	8	16	51	55	−4	50	
11	Skelmersdale United (R)	38	16	0	22	58	74	−16	48	Relegation to the North West Counties League
12	City of Liverpool	38	13	7	18	50	59	−9	46	
13	Bootle	38	12	10	16	51	61	−10	46	
14	1874 Northwich	38	12	9	17	44	50	−6	45	
15	Newcastle Town	38	12	9	17	40	67	−27	45	
16	Hanley Town	38	11	11	16	50	61	−11	44	
17	Widnes	38	12	8	18	40	66	−26	44	
18	Glossop North End (R)	38	10	9	19	44	59	−15	39	Qualification for the inter-step play-off
19	Colne (R)	38	9	10	19	38	57	−19	37	Relegation to the North West Counties League
20	Ramsbottom United (R)	38	7	6	25	39	81	−42	27	Relegation to the North West Counties League

Source: NPL official site
Rules for classification: 1) points; 2) goal difference; 3) number of goals scored; 4) number of matches won; 5) head-to-head results
(C) Champions; (O) Play-off winners; (P) Promoted; (R) Relegated

Skelmersdale United were relegated instead of Widnes because Skelmersdale were unable to meet the FA ground grading regulations. Their artificial pitch at JMO Sports Park failed a "bounce test", and the ground they shared at Burscough was graded at Step 5.

=== Top goalscorers ===
Rank	Player	Club	Goals
1	(England) James Berry	Macclesfield	24
2	(England) Mason Fawns	Mossley	17
2	(England) Sefton Gonzales	Clitheroe	17
2	(England) Elliot Morris	Skelmersdale United	17
2	(England) David Symington	Workington	17
6	(England) Scott Allison	Workington	15
6	(England) Tim Grice	Leek Town	15
6	(England) Nicky Maynard	Macclesfield	15
9	(England) Jamie Rainford	Runcorn Linnets	14

=== Results table ===
Home \ Away	18N	BOO	COL	CLI	CLN	GNE	HAN	KID	LEE	MAC	MOS	NEW	PRE	RAM	RUN	SKE	TRA	WID	WIT	WOR
1874 Northwich	—	1–1	2–0	1–2	4–1	0–2	0–1	2–2	0–0	0–0	0–1	2–0	0–0	1–1	0–1	2–1	2–0	2–0	1–4	4–3
Bootle	2–0	—	2–1	0–4	1–2	1–2	1–4	1–1	0–4	1–2	1–1	1–2	3–1	1–2	2–3	2–1	2–0	2–2	2–1	0–1
City of Liverpool	1–2	1–1	—	2–0	1–0	0–3	1–0	2–1	0–5	0–1	0–0	1–2	0–1	2–1	1–1	1–2	3–2	4–0	1–1	3–0
Clitheroe	1–3	4–0	3–2	—	4–1	3–2	4–3	1–3	1–0	1–1	2–1	7–1	2–2	2–0	0–1	0–1	1–2	4–2	4–1	1–1
Colne	1–0	1–1	2–1	2–1	—	3–0	1–2	0–2	0–1	1–1	2–3	1–2	0–2	2–1	1–0	1–2	2–2	0–1	1–1	2–3
Glossop North End	0–1	0–3	1–0	1–2	0–1	—	2–4	2–1	1–1	1–2	2–3	4–1	1–1	2–1	1–1	1–2	0–0	1–1	2–2	0–3
Hanley Town	4–0	2–0	2–3	1–1	2–2	1–0	—	2–2	0–0	1–1	1–1	1–2	0–1	0–0	2–2	2–4	1–2	0–2	0–0	1–2
Kidsgrove Athletic	3–3	2–1	2–0	2–1	2–1	1–0	1–2	—	0–1	0–3	2–2	0–0	2–0	2–1	0–1	1–2	0–1	1–1	1–1	1–3
Leek Town	2–1	3–2	4–1	3–2	1–0	3–1	4–1	1–1	—	1–3	1–1	0–1	4–1	1–1	0–2	3–1	1–3	3–0	0–1	0–1
Macclesfield	0–1	1–2	5–0	3–0	4–2	2–0	4–0	5–0	4–0	—	4–3	3–0	2–2	4–0	3–2	1–0	3–1	5–0	1–1	4–1
Mossley	3–0	1–0	2–1	1–1	1–1	3–0	2–1	1–2	0–2	1–3	—	1–1	2–1	1–0	1–0	1–2	2–2	4–1	1–1	1–3
Newcastle Town	2–2	1–0	1–6	1–0	0–1	1–1	1–1	1–1	1–2	0–2	1–5	—	3–2	0–2	0–2	0–1	1–0	2–1	1–1	0–1
Prescot Cables	2–1	2–2	1–1	0–2	0–0	2–0	4–0	0–0	1–4	1–2	2–1	0–0	—	3–1	1–0	2–1	1–2	0–1	2–1	1–1
Ramsbottom United	2–1	0–1	1–2	2–3	0–0	1–4	1–3	2–3	2–3	0–5	3–1	2–1	2–1	—	1–3	3–5	3–2	0–0	0–3	0–3
Runcorn Linnets	2–2	1–1	0–2	1–2	2–0	0–0	0–0	2–0	0–1	2–1	1–2	3–1	2–0	5–0	—	3–0	2–1	3–1	1–0	1–3
Skelmersdale United	0–2	2–4	2–4	0–1	2–1	0–2	1–2	1–2	2–4	1–4	1–0	1–3	3–2	1–0	1–4	—	2–3	2–0	0–1	1–2
Trafford	1–0	2–3	3–2	2–1	1–1	2–2	0–2	1–1	0–2	0–1	2–0	2–2	1–2	1–0	0–0	2–3	—	2–0	2–1	1–2
Widnes	1–0	1–1	3–0	0–0	1–1	3–2	1–0	1–2	0–2	0–4	2–1	1–3	0–3	3–1	1–1	1–3	2–1	—	2–3	1–0
Witton Albion	1–0	2–2	0–0	1–1	1–0	0–1	5–1	3–2	1–2	1–0	0–2	3–1	1–0	5–1	4–2	5–3	0–1	1–2	—	3–2
Workington	2–1	0–1	0–0	0–1	4–0	3–0	3–0	3–0	1–1	0–1	0–1	3–0	3–3	1–1	2–1	2–1	2–1	2–1	5–0	—

Source: NPL official site
Legend: Blue = home team win; Yellow = draw; Red = away team win.

=== Play-offs ===
Semifinals
2	Leek Town	1
5	Runcorn Linnets	3
3	Workington	2
4	Clitheroe	0

Final
5	Runcorn Linnets	1
3	Workington	2

Semi-finals

25 April 2023	Leek Town	1–3	Runcorn Linnets	Leek
19:45	Grice 31'	Report	Doyle 11'; Gumbs 20'; Brooke 52'	Stadium: Harrison Park; Attendance: 1,392

25 April 2023	Workington	2–0	Clitheroe	Workington
19:45	Tinnion 31' (pen.); Symington 76'	Report		Stadium: Borough Park; Attendance: 1,665; Referee: Louis Griffiths

Final

29 April 2023	Workington	2–1 (a.e.t.)	Runcorn Linnets	Workington
15:00	Heathcote 30' (own goal); Reilly 99'	Report	Doyle 5'	Stadium: Borough Park (Workington); Attendance: 2,506; Referee: Zac Kennard-Kettle

Inter-step play-off

29 April 2023	Glossop North End	0–3	Ashington	Glossop
15:00		Report	Harmison 26', 66'; Spooner 69'	Stadium: The Amdec Forklift Stadium; Attendance: 1,052

=== Stadia and locations ===
Locations of Northern Premier League 2022–23 Division One West teams

Team	Location	Stadium	Capacity
1874 Northwich	Barnton	The Offside Trust Stadium (groundshare with Barnton)	3,000
Bootle	Bootle	New Bucks Park	3,750
City of Liverpool	Bootle	New Bucks Park (groundshare with Bootle)	3,750
Clitheroe	Clitheroe	Shawbridge	2,000
Colne	Colne	Holt House	1,800
Glossop North End	Glossop	The Amdec Forklift Stadium	1,301
Hanley Town	Stoke-on-Trent	Potteries Park	1,300
Kidsgrove Athletic	Kidsgrove	The Autonet Insurance Stadium	2,000
Leek Town	Leek	Harrison Park	3,600
Macclesfield	Macclesfield	Leasing.com Stadium	4,720
Mossley	Mossley	Seel Park	4,000
Newcastle Town	Newcastle-under-Lyme	Lyme Valley Stadium	4,000
Prescot Cables	Prescot	IP Truck Parts Stadium	3,200
Ramsbottom United	Ramsbottom	The Harry Williams Riverside	2,000
Runcorn Linnets	Runcorn	APEC Taxis Stadium	1,600
Skelmersdale United	Skelmersdale	One Call Stadium - JMO Sports Park	1,300
Trafford	Flixton	Shawe lane	2,500
Widnes	Widnes	Halton Stadium	13,350
Witton Albion	Northwich	Wincham Park	4,813
Workington	Workington	Borough Park	3,101

== Challenge Cup ==
For the third successive season, it was announced to member clubs that the League Challenge Cup was cancelled and for the foreseeable future that would not be contested.

== See also ==
- Northern Premier League
- 2022–23 Isthmian League
- 2022–23 Southern League
