= Hinckley Leicester Road F.C. =

Association football club in England

Coordinates: 52.5591°N 1.3404°W

Hinckley LRFC
- Full name: Hinckley Leicester Road Football Club
- Nickname: The Knitters
- Founded: 2013
- Ground: Leicester Road Stadium, Hinckley
- Capacity: 6,250 (732 seated)
Home colours	Away colours

Hinckley Leicester Road Football Club is a football club based in Hinckley, England. Formed on 4 November 2013 after the liquidation of Hinckley United the previous month, they played at the Leicester Road Stadium.

== History ==
When Hinckley United folded in October 2013, two clubs were formed to replace them; Hinckley AFC and Leicester Road. Leicester Road were accepted into Division Two of the newly formed Midland League for the 2014–15 season. They were runners-up in their first season, earning promotion to Division One, where they would play Hinckley AFC for the first time.

In 2016–17 Leicester Road club won the Leicestershire and Rutland Senior Cup, beating Holwell Sports 2–1 in the final. In 2021 the club were promoted and transferred to the Premier Division South of the United Counties League based on their results in the abandoned 2019–20 and 2020–21 seasons. In September 2021 the club were renamed Hinckley LRFC. The 2021–22 season saw them finish second in the Premier Division South, earning promotion to Division One Midlands of the Northern Premier League.

On 6 June 2025, the club announced that they were going into Voluntary Liquidation, due to the loss of key sponsors and a drop in revenue.

=== Season-by-season ===
Season	Division	P	W	D	L	F	A	GD	Pts	Pos
2014–15	Midland League Division Two	30	15	10	5	78	34	44	50	2/16
2015–16	Midland League Division One	38	23	8	7	98	41	57	77	4/20
2016–17	Midland League Division One	38	25	4	9	117	36	81	79	3/20
2017–18	Midland League Division One	42	28	6	8	99	52	47	90	4/20
2018–19	Midland League Division One	35	23	3	9	91	32	59	72	5/19
2019–20	Midland League Division One	32	25	4	3	96	23	73	79	1/20
2020–21	Midland League Division One	11	8	2	1	27	5	22	26	2/19
2021–22	United Counties League Premier Division South	38	32	3	3	108	29	79	99	2/21
2022–23	Northern Premier League Division One Midlands	38	11	11	16	37	-3	40	44	13/20
2023–24	Northern Premier League Division One Midlands	38	20	10	8	64	48	16	70	4/20
2024–25	Northern Premier League Division One Midlands	40	15	10	15	54	50	4	55	10/21

== Ground ==
Following their formation, both Hinckley AFC and Leicester Road attempted to secure the right to use Leicester Road Stadium. Leicester Road were ultimately successful in purchasing the stadium, with Hinckley AFC having to groundshare at Heather St John's.

== Honours ==
- Leicestershire and Rutland Senior Cup
  - Winners 2016–17

== Records ==
- Best FA Cup performance: First qualifying round, 2016–17
- Best FA Vase performance: First round, 2016–17, 2019–20
- Record attendance: 426 vs Bromsgrove Sporting, Midland League Division One, 11 April 2017
- Biggest win: 11–0 vs Southam United, Midland League Division One, 8 April 2017

== See also ==
- Hinckley Leicester Road F.C. managers
- Hinckley Leicester Road F.C. players
