= Coventry Alliance Football League =

Association football league in England

- Founded: 1904 (Renamed 1998)
- Country: England
- Divisions: 4
- Number of clubs: 40
- Feeder to: Midland Football League Division Three

The Coventry Alliance Football League, formerly known as the Coventry Works League, is an association football competition in England that is composed of four divisions, currently containing a total of 40 teams. Originally the league consisted of six divisions but in the 2016-17 season the Alliance 5 was dropped leaving five divisions, then in the 2022-23 season Alliance 4 was dropped bringing the league to four divisions.

== Member clubs 2025-26 ==
Premier Division

- Copsewood (Coventry)
- Coventry Colliery
- Coventry Phoenix
- Dunlop
- Folly Lane BCOB Assoc
- Jet Blades
- Kenilworth Wardens
- RS Sports

Alliance 1

- AFC Coventry
- Brinklow Saturday
- Christ The King
- Coundon Court OBs
- Coventry Warriors
- Fillongley
- Folly Lane BCOB Assoc Reserves
- GNP Sports
- Polonia Coventry
- Triumph Athletic
- Whitnash Town

Alliance 2

- Balsall/Berkswell Hornets FC
- Christ The King Reserves
- Coventrians Reserves
- Coventry Phoenix Reserves
- Craven Athletic FC
- GNP Sports Lions
- Jaguar Daimler
- Shilton
- Woodlands WMC

Alliance 3

- Bourton & Frankton FC
- Coventry Colliery Reserves
- Coventry Phoenix Thirds
- Dunlop Reserves
- Jet Blades Reserves
- Kenilworth Wardens Reserves
- Panjab Athletic
- RS Sports Reserves
- Shilton Reserves
- Sporting Coventry
- St John Fisher Coventry
- Warwick Juniors FC Seniors

== Recent champions ==
Season	Premier	Alliance One	Alliance Two	Alliance Three	Alliance Four	Alliance Five
2022-23	Folly Lane B C O B Assoc First	Bulkington Poppys First	Whitnash Town First	Woodlands W M C First		
2021-22	Dunlop First	R S Sports First	Bulkington Poppys 1st	Stockingford A A Pavilion Piv	Yelvertoft First	
2020-21						
2019-20						
2018-19	Copeswood (Coventry)	AFC Woods United	Stockton	Dunlop Reserves	Crick Athletic Reserves	
2017-18	AEI Rugby	Bulkington S&S	Stockingford AA	Coventry Plumbing	Balsall & Berkswell MFL	
2016-17	AEI Rugby	Dunlop	Gurdwara GNP	Copsewood (Coventry) Reserves	Bulkington S & S Reserves	
2015-16	Folly Lane	Stockton	Folly Lane Reserves	Rugby	Stockingford AA Pavilion	Copsewood (Coventry) Reserves
2014–15	AEI Rugby	Copsewood	Peugeot Millpool	AFC Woods United	Rugby	Westwood Heath
2013–14	Bell (AEI) Rugby	Sphinx Sports & Social	Stoneleigh	Whitnash Town Reserves	Crick Athletic	Gurdwara GNP
2012–13	Brinklow	Jaguar-Daimler	Kenilworth Wardens	Stoneleigh	Brinklow Reserves	Bermuda Reserves
2011–12	Highway Coundon Court	Brinklow	Hartshill	Woodlands Working Mens Club Reserves	Jaguar/Daimler Reserves	Brinklow Reserves
2010–11	Christ the King	Stockingford Allotments Association Pavilion	Brinklow	Jaguar-Daimler	Massey Ferguson Reserves	Church Lawford Reserves
2009–10	Alvis	Christ The King Res	Fillongley	Church Lawford	Bermuda	Wolston
2008–09	Alvis	Alvis Reserves	Copsewood (Coventry)	Hartshill	Church Lawford	Bermuda
2007–08	Christ The King	Potters Green Community Association	Stockton	Dunlop	AFC Whitnash	Church Lawford
2006–07	Witherley United	AEI Rugby	Collycroft Sports	Stockton Reserves	Woodlands Working Mens Club Reserves	Hartshill
2005–06	Mount Nod Highway	Stockingford Allotments Association Pavilion	Brooklands/Jaguar Reserves	Peugeot Reserves	Brinklow	Hub
2004–05	Mount Nod Highway	Coventry Sphinx Reserves	Stockingford Allotments Association Pavilion	Potters Green Community Association	Christ The King 'A'	Potters Green Community Association Reserves
2003–04	Bedworth Ex-Services	Peugeot	Coventry Sphinx Reserves	Newdigate Sports	Potters Green	Balsall & Berkswell
2002–03	Bedworth Ex.Service	Triumph Athletic	Oakwood Alvis	Coundon Court Old Boys	Woodlands Working Mens Club	Coventry University
2001–02	Folly Lane Boys Club Old Boys	Coundon Court Old Boys	Unity Sports	Attleborough Village	Meriden Rovers	Highway Sports
2000–01	Jet Blades	Marconi (Coventry)	Collycroft Sports	Unity Sports	Bermuda Working Mens Club	Coundon Court
1999–2000	Folly Lane	Marconi (Coventry)	Ambleside Sports	Brooklands/Jaguar	Dunlop	Meriden Rovers
1998–99	Stockingford Allotments Association	Brooklands/Jaguar	Bulkington Sports & Social	Christ The King	GPT (Coventy)	Balsall & Berkswell
1997–98	Nuneaton Griff	Nuneaton Griff Reserves	Pottertons	Folly Lane Old Boys	Christ The King	Dunlop
1996–97	Nuneaton Griff	Witherley	Nuneaton Griff	Potterton Myson	Triumph Athletic	Jaguar/Daimler
1995–96	Stockingford Allotments Association	Brico	Foleshill Athletic	Brico	Potterton Myson	Stockton
