= Coventry United F.C. =

Association football club in England

Coordinates: 52°24′22″N 1°31′33″W

Coventry United
- Full name: Coventry United Football Club
- Nicknames: The Red and Greens, United
- Founded: 1 July 2013; 13 years ago
- Stadium: Nick Newbold Stadium
- Capacity: 4,000 (3,000 seats)
- Chairman: Raymond Nowack
- Manager: Terry Anderson
- League: Northern Premier League Division One Midlands
- 2025–26: United Counties League Premier Division South, 2nd of 20 (promoted via play-offs)
- Website: covunited.com
Home colours	Away colours

Coventry United Football Club is an English association football club based in Coventry in the West Midlands, England, United Kingdom. The team competes in the Northern Premier League Division One Midlands, the 8th tier of English football, and is managed by Terry Anderson.

The club was founded in 2013 by then Chairman Jason Kay along with three co-chairmen, Jason Timms, Marcus Green, Pete Schofield, and Club Secretary Graham Wood, following a takeover of Coventry Spartans in reaction to Coventry City moving from the Ricoh Arena to Northampton to play at Sixfields Stadium. Edwin Greaves had been in charge of the club since its foundation until the spring of 2016 when he was replaced by Terry Anderson.

On 4 July 2015, the club announced the takeover of Coventry City Ladies F.C, re-branding the ladies' side Coventry United Ladies F.C.; But this arrangement ended in June 2023 when the women's team was rebranded as Rugby Borough W.F.C.

== History ==
=== 2013 ===
Coventry United Football Club was founded following the takeover of Coventry Spartans. The Spartans' manager, Edwin Greaves, stayed on as Coventry United's first manager, along with club secretary, Graham Wood. The club's debut league match took place at Kenilworth Town in the Midland Football League Division 3 on Saturday, 13 August 2013, with a 2-1 victory. Kenroy Dennisur and Brian Ndlovu scored the goals that day. United finished runners-up to Kenilworth, securing promotion. Coventry United also reached their first Cup final, The Challenge Vase, losing 3-1 to Enville Athletic FC. The club's first league title followed the next season. Coventry United dominated MFL Division 2, finishing 15 points ahead of its closest rivals. Their progression to Step 6 of the Non-League Pyramid followed. Season 3 saw Coventry United fighting for the Division 1 title with the likes of Bromsgrove Sporting, Lichfield, and Nuneaton Griff.

=== 2016 ===
In March 2016, Edwin Greaves left the club and was replaced on an interim basis by Terry Anderson, along with his assistant, Luke Morton. Under Terry's stewardship, United began a run to win their final 11 matches, conceding just 3 goals along the way. Consequently, they beat their competition to the title. Afterwards, Anderson and Morton's roles were secured on a permanent basis. Following a flurry of promotions, Coventry settled into the MFL Premier Division.

=== 2017 ===
Following stints at The Cage (Alan Higgs Centre) and Sphinx Drive, the summer of 2017 saw United move into their new home, the Butts Park Arena.

=== 2020 ===
The club was bought from the original owners by Coventry-based businessman Joe Haggarty. After 5 seasons in the MFL Premier Division and finishing as Coventry's highest-ranked non-league club for 5 years in a row, the restructuring of the non-league pyramid saw Coventry United placed in the United Counties League Premier Division South. Following the departure of Terry Anderson in November 2021, the Red and Greens hired manager, Russell Dodds, and assistant manager, Darren Acton. They resigned from their roles for personal reasons several weeks later.

=== 2022 ===
In February 2022, Joe Haggarty resigned as chairman and manager of Coventry United Football Club, with Ivor Lawton taking charge of first-team responsibilities. Long-term club supporter Nigel Ward took over the club in March 2022. After working to stabilize the club, Nigel stepped aside and was replaced as chairman by local businessman, Michael Kavanagh, with John Goodman appointed as vice chairman. In the summer of 2022, Carl Nolan took over as Team Manager.

=== 2023 ===
Carl Nolan was appointed as First Team Manager in the summer of 2022 and remained in the post until he resigned on 31 October 2023. On 1 November, Ellis Alleyne was promoted to the manager position from the under 21's to help steady the ship on a temporary basis, during this time he was assisted by John Goodman, vice chair and Rob Hennedy who stepped up from the clubs under 18’s whilst the club made a decision on the next manager. Following a tough run of fixtures on 1 December Ellis Alleyne was given the permanent role of manager and guided the team to a respectable 14th placed finish. Michael Kavanagh made the decision to stand down from his position as chairman and was replaced in the role by John Goodman.

=== 2024 ===
The month of March 2024 was significant for the club's future plans as it introduced a new co ownership team with Raymond Nowack buying into the club on 7 March 2024 and Hamad Al Salem on 29 March 2024. On 25 May The club made the decision to part ways with manager Ellis Alleyne. Jamie Hood was appointed as the club's new manager with Aaron Eales joining as assistant manager. Rob Hennedy, along with Lucy Stead, the team's physio, agreed to stay on as part of the backroom team and were joined by Craig Jee to complete the coaching team. After a stable pre-season campaign, the league season got off to a tough start with three heavy defeats leading to chairman and co-owner John Goodman stepping down on 7 August. The club also parted company with Jamie Hood, Aaron Eales and Craig Jee. Ellis Alleyne was soon reappointed as first team manager and he appointed Jamie Burkacki as assistant manager, with Rob Hennedy and Lucy Stead continuing to be a part of the backroom team. On 12 August Raymond Nowack was appointed as the new club chairman, whilst he and Hamad Al Salam remain as a majority shareholders.

=== Manager History ===
Managers of Coventry United F.C
Dates	Name
July 2013 - March 2016	Edwin Greaves
March 2016 - November 2021	Terry Anderson
November 2021 - December 2021	Russell Dodds
June 2022 - August 2022	Ivor Lawton
August 2022 - October 2023	Carl Nolan
December 2023 - May 2024	Ellis Alleyne
May 2024 - August 2024	Jamie Hood
August 2024 - August 2025	Ellis Alleyne

== Stadium ==
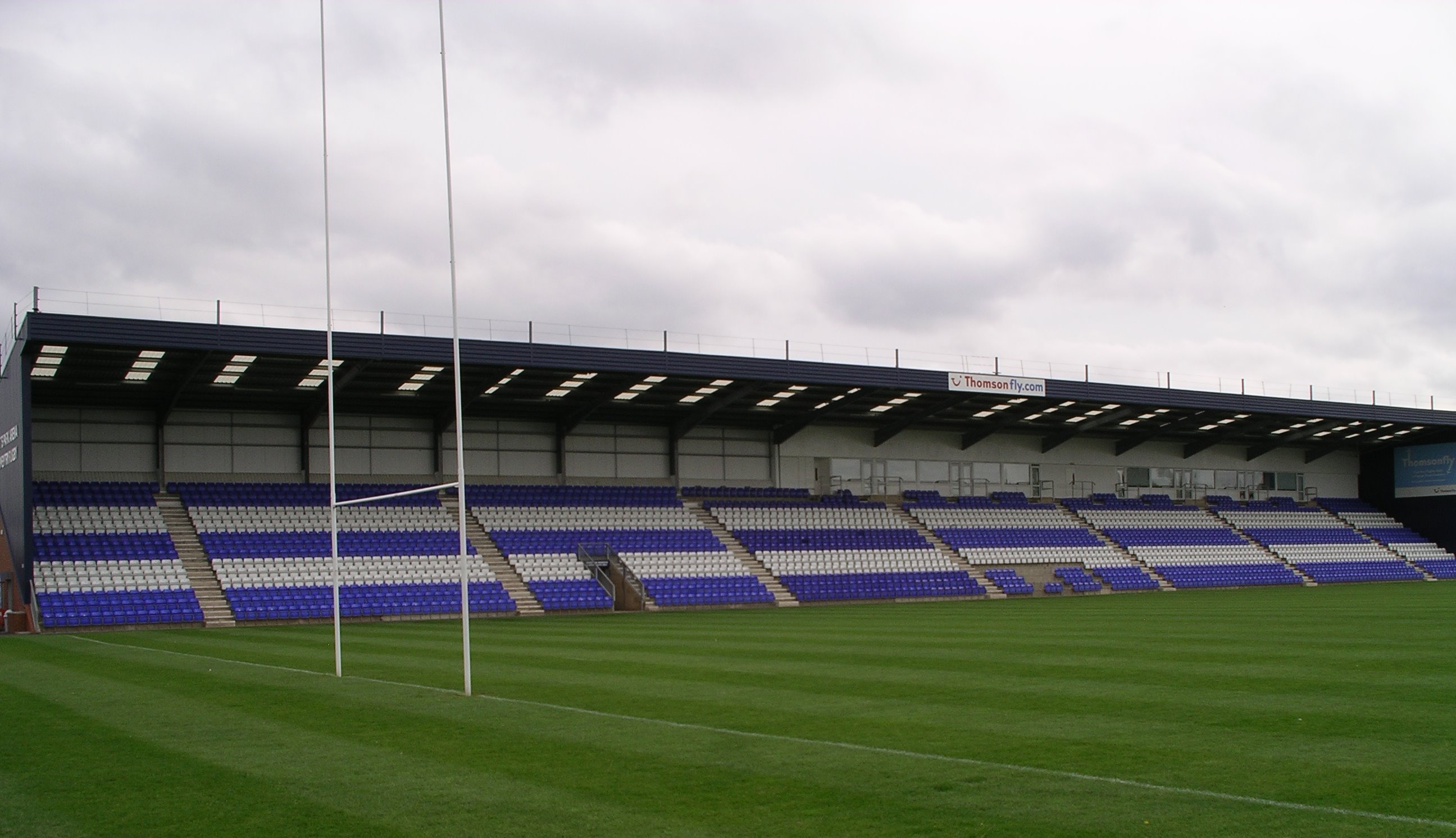
Nick Newbold Stadium

Coventry United currently play their home games at the Nick Newbold Stadium (formerly known as Butts Park Arena) in Coventry.

Nick Newbold Stadium is a multi-use sports stadium in Spon End, Coventry, England. Its main use is as a rugby stadium. It is the home ground for Coventry R.F.C.

It was also formerly the home ground of the Coventry Jets, an American football team. From the 2017–18 season, the stadium is also the home of Coventry United, a non-league football club.

The stadium was built in 2004 and currently has one stand, known for sponsorship reasons as the XL Motors stand, which has a capacity of 3,000 and includes several conference and banqueting facilities. The West Stand which was a temporary structure holding 1,000 was removed at the end of the 2005–06 season on grounds of health and safety. There is also standing space for up to 1,000 supporters around the pitch. The stadium now holds a capacity of 5,200.

In June 2019, the pitch was replaced with an artificial playing surface.

== Colours ==

Coventry United's home kit is made up of the city's civic colours, red and green.

The shirt is red and the shorts and socks are the same shade of dark green.

The club's away strip is a full dark green strip.

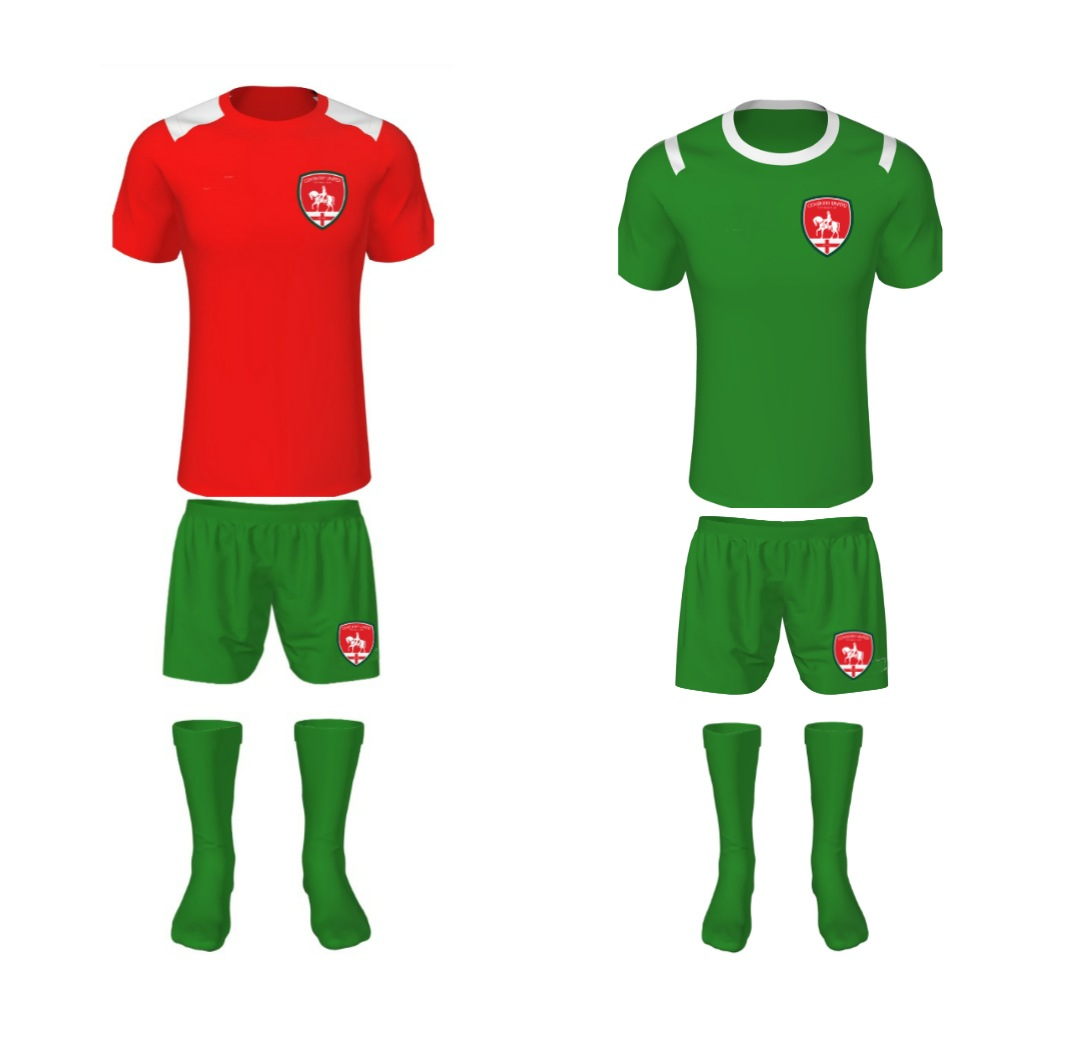

== Former ladies team ==
On 4 July 2015, Coventry City Ladies F.C. announced that they would merge with Coventry United and be rebranded as Coventry United Ladies F.C. from the beginning of the 2015–16 Women's Premier League season.

In June 2023, following the team's relegation from the Women's Championship, the second tier of women's domestic football in England, Coventry United's association with the women's team was terminated and the team was renamed Rugby Borough W.F.C.

== Backroom staff and club officials ==
Name	Position
(England) Vacant	Manager
(England) Jamie Burclacki	Assistant Manager
(England) Rob Hennedy	Goalkeeping Coach
(England) Lucy Stead	Club Physio
(England) Marian Davis	Club Secretary

== Seasons ==
Year	League	Level	P	W	D	L	F	A	GD	Pts	Position	Leading league scorer(s)	Goals	FA Cup	FA Vase	Average attendance
2013–14	Midland Combination Div. Two	12	30	22	2	6	105	33	+72	68	2nd of 16; Promoted as runners-up	Daniel Stokes; Brian Ndlovu; Nathan Stoute	26; 17; 8	not eligible	not eligible	not enough data
2014–15	Midland League Div. Two	11	30	22	4	4	97	40	+57	70	1st of 16; Promoted as champions	Daniel Stokes; Joshua Blake; Sean Kavanagh	24; 17; 10	not eligible	not eligible	97
2015–16	Midland League Div. One	10	38	33	1	4	123	33	+90	100	1st of 20; Promoted as champions	Joshua O'Grady; Matthew Brown; Chris Cox	29; 15; 15	DNP	not eligible	98
2016–17	Midland League Premier Div.	9	42	18	8	16	63	57	+6	62	8th of 22	Kai Williams; Chris Cox; Joshua O'Grady	14; 12; 11	QR1	1st Round	100
2017–18	Midland League Premier Div.	9	42	18	7	17	80	77	+3	61	8th of 22	Shaq McDonald; Craig Reid; Mitchell Piggon; Lewis Rankin	13; 10; 9; 9	EP1	3rd Round	229
2018–19	Midland League Premier Div.	9	38	16	8	14	52	47	+5	56	8th of 20	Tyler Haddow; Joseph Cairns; Kyle Carey	6; 5; 5	EP1	4th Round	not enough data
2019–20	Midland League Premier Div.	9	29	19	5	5	60	31	+29	62	1st of 20 (at time of cancellation)	Matthew Gardner; Christopher Camwell; Joseph Cairns	16; 12; 8	EP1	4th Round	not enough data
2020–21	Midland League Premier Div.	9	9	6	0	3	23	15	+5	18	9th of 19 (at time of cancellation)	Riley-Cole O'Sullivan; Joshua O'Grady; Kyle Carey	9; 6; 5	PR	3rd Round	not enough data

== Records and honours ==
=== Club honours ===
- Midland Football League Division One
  - Winners: 2015–16
- Midland Football League Division Two
  - Winners: 2014–15
- Midland Football League Division Three
  - Runners-Up: 2013–14
- Presidents Cup
  - Winners: 2014–15
- Birmingham FA Challenge Vase
  - Runners-Up: 2013–14

=== Team records ===
- Biggest league win: Coventry United 28–0 Polesworth (17 April 2014)
- Biggest league loss: Quorn 7-1 Coventry United (16 April 2018)
- Longest unbeaten run (all competitions): 25 matches (8 November 2014 – 4 May 2015)
- Longest unbeaten run (league only): 21 matches (4 October 2014 – 4 May 2015)
- Most clean sheets in a row (all competitions): 6 (19 April 2016 – 7 August 2016)
- Most clean sheets in a row (league only): 8 (19 April 2016 – 23 August 2016)

=== Player records ===
- Most club appearances (all competitions): 179 (Chris Cox)
- Most club appearances (league only): 146 (Chris Cox)
- Top club goalscorer (all competitions): 60 (Joshua O'Grady)
- Top club goalscorer (league only): 42 (Joshua O'Grady, Chris Cox, Daniel Stokes)
- First competitive goal for the club: Stefan McGrath (10 October 2013)
- Most goals scored in one game by a single player: 6 (Daniel Stokes (Coventry United 28–0 Polesworth; 17 April 2014))

=== Cup records ===
- Best FA Cup performance: Third qualifying round, 2026–27
- Best FA Vase performance: Quarter-finals, 2025–26
