= Ashby Ivanhoe F.C. =

Association football club in England

Coordinates: 52.7374°N 1.4671°W

Ashby Ivanhoe
- Full name: Ashby Ivanhoe Football Club
- Nickname: The Knights
- Ground: NFU Sports Ground, Ashby-de-la-Zouch
- Chairman: Derrick Barratt
- Manager: Lee Barratt
- League: United Counties League Premier Division North
- 2025–26: United Counties League Premier Division North, 13th of 20
Home colours	Away colours

Ashby Ivanhoe Football Club are a football club based in Ashby-de-la-Zouch, Leicestershire, England. They are currently members of the United Counties League Premier Division North and play at the NFU Sports Ground.

== History ==
The club joined Division One of the Coalville & District League in 1947. In 1967 the club transferred to Division Two of the Burton & District League, but were relegated to Division Three at the end of their first season in the league. They were relegated again in 1974–75, but after finishing as runners-up in Division Four in 1976–77, the club were promoted to Division Three. They were promoted to Division Two at the end of the 1979–80 season. and went on to finish as runners-up in Division Two the following season, also winning the Ivanhoe Shield. The club subsequently won Division Two in 1983–84 and again in 1986–87.

In the late 1980s Ashby joined the North Leicestershire League. They won the Premier Division for the first time in 1994–95. After winning the Chairman's Shield the following season, the 1996–97 season saw them win the treble of the Premier Division, the Cobbin Trophy and the Chairman's Shield, whilst the reserve team won Division One of the league. They went on to win the Premier Division again in 1998–99 and 2002–03. In 2005 the club moved up to Division One of the Leicestershire Senior League. After finishing third in 2005–06 and seventh in 2006–07, the 2007–08 season saw the club claim the runners-up spot, earning promotion to the Premier Division. After two seasons in which they finished third and fifth, they won the Premier Division in 2010–11.

In 2013–14 Ashby finished third in the Premier Division, missing out on the title on goal difference. However, the third-place finish was enough to be promoted to the East Midlands Counties League. At the end of the 2018–19 season the club were transferred to Division One of the Midland League. They finished fourth in Division One in 2021–22, qualifying for the promotion play-offs, in which they lost 4–2 to Stapenhill in the semi-finals. In 2022–23 the club were runners-up in Division One. In the subsequent play-offs, they defeated Black Country Rangers 1–0 in the semi-final, before beating Droitwich Spa 2–1 in the final to earn promotion to the Premier Division North of the United Counties League.

== Ground ==
The club initially played at Hood Park in Ashby-de-la-Zouch town centre. However, after the council refused the club permission to build a new stand, the club opted to move to the NFU Sports Ground, former home of Old Ashbeians rugby club, in 2012. Hood Park remains in use for the club's under-18 and Sunday teams, although the floodlights were taken to the NFU Sports Ground.

A wooden seated stand is located behind one goal, with a modern stand on the side of the pitch where the dugouts are located; the other end and side of the pitch are both out-of-bounds. The ground's record attendance was broken twice during the club's 2016–17 FA Cup run, their first entry to the competition. The extra-preliminary round match against Quorn on 6 August 2016 saw a record attendance of 252, which was bettered by the crowd of 693 against Ilkeston in a first qualifying round match on 3 September. A new record of 836 was set for the Division One play-off final against Droitwich Spa on 6 May 2023.

== Honours ==
- Leicestershire Senior League
  - Premier Division champions 2010–11
- North Leicestershire League
  - Premier Division champions 1994–95, 1996–97, 1998–99, 2002–03
  - Chairman's Shield winners 1995–96, 1996–97
  - Cobbin Trophy winners 1996–97
- Burton & District League
  - Division Two champions 1983–84, 1986–87
  - Ivanhoe Shield winners 1980–81
- Ashby Charity Cup
  - Winners 1996–97
- Coalville Charity Cup
  - Winners 2010–11

== Records ==
- Best FA Cup performance: First qualifying round, 2016–17, 2023–24, 2024–25
- Best FA Vase performance: Fourth round, 2023–24, 2024–25
- Record attendance: 836 vs Droitwich Spa, Division One play-off final, 6 May 2023

== See also ==
- Ashby Ivanhoe F.C. managers
