= Haughmond F.C. =

Association football club in England

Coordinates: 52°43′36.2562″N 2°43′6.3372″W

Haughmond
- Full name: Haughmond Football Club
- Nicknames: The Academicals, The Mond
- Founded: 1980
- Ground: Shrewsbury Sports Village, Shrewsbury
- Chairman: Tony O'Hanlon
- Manager: Chris Roberts
- League: North West Counties League Division One South
- 2025–26: North West Counties League Division One South, 18th of 18 (relegated)
Home colours	Away colours

Haughmond Football Club (/ˈhɔːrmənd/ HOR-mənd) is a football club based in Shrewsbury, Shropshire, England. They are currently members of the North West Counties League Division One South and play at Shrewsbury Sports Village.

== History ==
The club was established in 1980, taking their name from Haughmond Hill, which overlooks the club's ground. They later joined the Shropshire County Premier League and were Premier Division runners-up in 2008–09 and 2009–10, before winning the league and the Ron Jones Memorial Cup in 2010–11. The club were subsequently promoted to Division Two of the West Midlands (Regional) League, and went on to win Division Two the following season, resulting in promotion to Division One. In 2013–14 the club were Division One runners-up and were promoted to the Premier Division.

The 2016–17 season saw Haughmond win the West Midlands (Regional) League Premier Division, resulting in promotion to the Premier Division of the Midland League. Although they finished third-from-bottom of the Premier Division the following season and were relegated back to the West Midlands (Regional) League, the club were runners-up in the West Midlands (Regional) League Premier Division in 2018–19, earning an immediate promotion back to the Premier Division of the Midland League. The 2021–22 season saw the club relegated to Division One after finishing bottom of the Premier Division. They subsequently finished bottom of Division One the following season and were relegated to the Premier Division of the Shropshire County League.

In 2024–25 Haughmond finished third in the Shropshire County League Premier Division and were promoted to Division One South of the North West Counties League.

== Ground ==
The club plays their home games on the 'Premier pitch' at Shrewsbury Sports Village, which they share with the academy of Shrewsbury Town. The ground has one small seated stand to the side of the pitch, the remainder of the ground being uncovered standing.

The club's record attendance was set by an FA Cup second qualifying round tie against Boston United on 19 September 2017, with 768 spectators attending the match.

== Backroom staff ==
Position	Staff
Club secretary	Stuart Williams
Manager	Chris Roberts
Coaching staff	Emile Burris & Lewis Speake
Goalkeeping coach	Sam Jones
Development squad manager	Dean Langford

== Honours ==
- West Midlands (Regional) League
  - Premier Division champions 2016–17
  - Division Two champions 2011–12
- Shropshire County Premier League
  - Premier Division champions 2010–11
  - Ron Jones Memorial Cup winners 2010–11

== Records ==
- Best FA Cup performance: Second qualifying round, 2017–18
- Best FA Vase performance: Second round, 2015–16
- Record attendance: 768 vs Boston United, FA Cup second qualifying round, 19 September 2017
