= Coventry Alvis F.C. =

Association football club in England

Coordinates: 52.375295°N 1.5233633°W

Coventry Alvis
- Full name: Coventry Alvis Football Club
- Nickname: The Tankmen
- Founded: 1928
- Ground: Alvis Sports and Social Club, Coventry
- Chairman: Don Corrigan
- Manager: Arron Cheshire
- League: Midland League Division Two
- 2025–26: Midland League Division Two, 13th of 15
Home colours

Coventry Alvis Football Club is a football club based in Coventry, West Midlands, England. They are currently members of the Midland League Division Two and play at the Alvis Sports and Social Club.

== History ==
The club was established as the works team of the Alvis Car and Engineering Company and joined the Coventry Combination in 1928. They left the league at the end of the 1934–35 season, reappearing in Division Two of the Coventry Works League in 1937, and by the early 1940s the club had been promoted to Division One, which they won in 1942–43. After being inactive between 1944 and 1950, they returned to Division Two of the league. The club were Division Two champions in 1951–52, earning promotion to Division One. They remained in Division One until finishing bottom of the division in 1960–61, after which the club were relegated to Division Two. In 1970–71 they were Division Two runners-up, earning promotion to Division One. The league was renamed the Coventry Alliance in 1971, and Division One was renamed the Premier Division II in 1973.

Alvis were Premier Division II runners-up in 1977–78, and after finishing third in 1983–84, they were promoted to Premier Division I. They went on to finish as runners-up in Premier Division I in 1985–86. Despite finishing bottom of the division in 1992–93, the club joined Division Two of the Midland Combination. A third-place finish in 1997–98 saw them promoted to Division One. After winning the league's Presidents Cup in 1998–99, the club was renamed Alvis Oakwood Coventry. They left the Midland Combination at the end of the 2000–01 season after several players left the club, dropping into Division Two of the Coventry Alliance.

The 2002–03 season saw Alvis win Division Two, earning promotion to Division One. In 2005–06 they were Division One runners-up and were promoted to the Premier Division. They went on to win back-to-back Premier Division titles in 2008–09 and 2009–10, and after finishing as runners-up in 2010–11, the club rejoined the Midland Combination in Division One. They were Division One champions in 2012–13, resulting in promotion to the Premier Division. In 2014 the Midland Combination merged with the Midland Alliance to form the Midland League, with Alvis becoming members of Division One. However, they finished bottom of Division One in 2014–15 and were relegated to Division Two. Although they won Division Two in 2015–16 the club were not promoted. However, after finishing as runners-up the following season, they were promoted to Division One.

However, Alvis finished bottom of Division One in 2017–18 and were relegated back to Division Two. They then changed their name to Coventry Alvis.

== Ground ==
The club played at Holyhead Road until moving to the Butts Stadium in 1989. They then moved to Sports Connexions ground at Ryton, before relocating to the Alvis Sports and Social Club on Green Lane in Finham. A 150-capacity stand was built in 1998 when the club were promoted to Division One of the Midland Combination. In 2013 they began groundsharing at Southam United's Banbury Road ground, before returning to the Alvis Sports and Social Club in 2015.

== Honours ==
- Midland Combination
  - Division One champions 2012–13
  - Presidents Cup winners 1998–99
- Coventry Alliance
  - Champions 1942–43, 2008–09, 2009–10
  - Division Two champions 1951–52, 2002–03
  - Harold Dunn Cup winners 1980–81
  - Bermuda Cup winners 1983–84
  - Sphinx Cup winners 1951–52
  - Riley Cup winners 1951–52
- Midland Daily Telegraph Junior Cup
  - Winners 1929–30

== See also ==
- Coventry Alvis F.C. players
