= GNP Sports F.C. =

Association football club in England

Coordinates: 52°24′4.972″N 1°28′19.132″W

GNP Sports
- Full name: GNP Sports Football Club
- Founded: 1983
- Ground: Sphinx Drive, Coventry
- Chairman: Satnam Ark
- Manager: Shamir Alam
- League: Coventry Alliance League Division One
- 2024–25: Coventry Alliance League Division One, 6th of 11
Home colours

GNP Sports is a football club based in Coventry, West Midlands, England. They are currently members of the Coventry Alliance League Division One and play at Sphinx Drive, groundsharing with Coventry Sphinx.

== History ==
The club was founded in 1983 as Longford after the area of Coventry that the founders were based in. Two years later, the club changed their name to GNP Sports, after the Guru Nanak Prakash Gurdwara in the city. In the 1997–98 season, the club joined the Midland Football Combination Division Three, winning promotion at the first attempt into Division Two. In 2000, the club withdrew from the league due to a lack of players. In 2017–18, GNP Sports joined the Midland League from the Coventry Alliance League. The club won promotion from Division Three at the end of the season alongside a league cup win. The club won another promotion the following year from Division Two along with a League Cup Win. GNP Sports entered the FA Vase for the first time in 2018–19.

Multiple posts in the NonLeagueMatters forum indicated that GNP Sports dropped back to the Coventry Alliance League from the Midland League before the 2021–22 season for unspecified reasons.

== Ground ==
The club currently groundshare with Coventry Sphinx at Sphinx Drive, having previously played at the University of Warwick. Sphinx Drive, the name of which was adopted in 1995. In the mid-1990s a new stand was built and opened with a friendly match between Coventry Sphinx and Coventry City team. The record attendance at Sphinx Drive was when Hereford F.C. came to Sphinx Drive with 935 watching the Bulls play Sphinx.

== Honours ==
- Midland League
  - Division Three champions 2012–13, 2017–18

== Records ==
- Best FA Vase performance: Second qualifying round, 2019–20
