= NKF Burbage F.C. =

Association football club in England

Coordinates: 52°34′21.709″N 1°20′28.320″W

NKF Burbage
- Full name: NKF Burbage Football Club
- Founded: 2009
- Dissolved: 2020
- Ground: Kirkby Road, Barwell
Home colours	Away colours

NKF Burbage Football Club was a football club based in Burbage, Leicestershire, England. The club was affiliated to the Leicestershire and Rutland County Football Association.

== History ==
The club was founded as NKF United in 2009. The initials NFK were abbreviation for the National Kidney Federation, which the club aimed was to raise awareness of. The club joined the Leicester & District League, and in 2011 they won promotion to Division One.

In 2013 the club were renamed as NKF Burbage. They won Division One and were promoted to the Premier Division as champions of Division One. After finishing as runners-up in the Premier Division the following season, the club moved up to Division One of the Leicestershire Senior League. In their first Senior League season they finished as Division One runners-up, after which they transferred to Division three of the Midland League. The 2016–17 season saw the club complete the season without losing a game in all competitions, winning the Leicestershire Intermediate Cup, the Midland League Challenge Vase and the Division Three title, earning promotion to Division Two. The following season saw the club win the Les James Challenge Cup, the league's President's Cup Winners, the Leicestershire and Rutland Senior Cup and Division Two, resulting in a second successive promotion, moving up Division One.

They folded after the 2019–20 season was abandoned due to the COVID-19 pandemic.

== Ground ==
The club played their home games at Kirkby Road, the ground of Barwell F.C.

== Honours ==
- Midland League
  - Division Two champions 2017–18
  - Division Three champions 2016–17
  - Les James Challenge Cup winners 2017–18
  - President's Cup Winners 2017–18
  - Challenge Vase Winners 2016–17
- Leicester & District League
  - Division One Champions 2013–14
- Leicestershire and Rutland Senior Cup
  - Winners 2017–18
- Leicestershire and Rutland Intermediary Cup
  - Winners 2016–17
