= Selston F.C. =

Association football club in England

Coordinates: 53°4′22.3″N 1°18′15.3″W

Selston
- Full name: Selston Football Club
- Nickname: The Parishioners
- Founded: 1968
- Ground: The Parish Hall Ground
- Chairman: Deene Ball
- Manager: Lee Stevenson / Benjamin Moore
- League: United Counties League Division One
- 2025–26: Central Midlands Alliance Premier Division South, 1st of 18 (promoted)
Home colours	Away colours

Selston F.C. is a football club based in Selston, Nottinghamshire. They are currently members of the United Counties League Division One and play at the Parish Hall Ground.

== History ==
The club was formed in 1968 as a Sunday league club, only moving to the senior game in 1986 when they joined the Central Midlands League (CMFL). They left in 1992 for the Midlands Regional Alliance (MRA), but rejoined the CMFL in 1997. They won promotion to the Supreme Division in 1999 but were relegated back to the Premier in 2002.

The first team was disbanded for three years from 2003 as the club focused on its youth set-up, but in 2006 they re-joined the MRA, winning the Division Two title in 2008 before moving to the Nottinghamshire Senior League in 2011. In 2015 they rejoined the Central Midlands League, winning the South Division title in 2016 and 2017, and were promoted to the East Midlands Counties League.

At the end of the 2020–21 season the club were transferred to the Premier Division North of the United Counties League.

== Honours ==
- East Midlands Counties League
  - Champions 2018–19
- Nottinghamshire Senior League
  - Champions 2013–14
- Central Midlands League South Division
  - Champions 2015–16, 2016–17
- Central Midlands League Challenge Cup
  - Winners 2016–17

== Records ==
- FA Vase
  - First qualifying round, 2000–01
