= 2010–11 FA Cup qualifying rounds =

Tournament details
- Country: England; Wales

The 2010–11 FA Cup qualifying rounds opened the 130th season of competition in England for 'The Football Association Challenge Cup' (FA Cup), the world's oldest association football single knockout competition. A total of 759 clubs were accepted for the competition, down three from the previous season's 762.

The large number of clubs entering the tournament from lower down (Levels 5 through 10) in the English football pyramid meant that the competition started with six rounds of preliminary (2) and qualifying (4) knockouts for these non-League teams. The 32 winning teams from the fourth round qualifying progressed to the First round proper, where League teams tiered at Levels 3 and 4 entered the competition.

== Calendar and prizes ==
The calendar of the 2010–11 FA Cup qualifying rounds, as announced by The FA.

Round	Main date	Leagues entering at this round	New entries this round	Winners from previous round	Number of fixtures	Prize money
Extra preliminary round	14 August 2010	Levels 9–10	402	none	201	£750
Preliminary round	28 August 2010	Level 8	131	201	166	£1,500
First round qualifying	11 September 2010	Level 7	66	166	116	£3,000
Second round qualifying	25 September 2010	Conference North; Conference South	44	116	80	£4,500
Third round qualifying	9 October 2010	none	none	80	40	£7,500
Fourth round qualifying	23 October 2010	Conference Premier	24	40	32	£12,500
For the next rounds look 2010–11 FA Cup

== Extra preliminary round ==
Extra Preliminary Round ties were played on the weekend of 14 August 2010. 402 clubs from Level 9 and Level 10 of English football, entered at this stage of the competition.

Tie	Home team (tier)	Score	Away team (tier)	Att.
1	Ryton (9)	0–1	Scarborough Athletic (9)	173
2	Liversedge (9)	0–3	Whitley Bay (9)	219
3	Brandon United (10)	1–2	Chester-le-Street Town (10)	74
4	Shildon (9)	4–3	Sunderland RCA (9)	104
5	Pickering Town (9)	1–4	South Shields (9)	210
6	Ashington (9)	4–1	Billingham Town (9)	198
7	Tow Law Town (9)	0–2	Jarrow Roofing BCA (9)	61
8	West Auckland Town (9)	2–1	Whickham (10)	58
9	West Allotment Celtic (9)	1–2	Tadcaster Albion (9)	75
10	Norton & Stockton Ancients (9)	2–1	Penrith (9)	105
11	Guisborough Town (10)	0–3	Armthorpe Welfare (9)	90
12	Bishop Auckland (9)	3–3	Consett (9)	200
replay	Consett (9)	2–3	Bishop Auckland (9)	202
13	Brighouse Town (9)	1–2	Dunston UTS (9)	200
14	Hebburn Town (10)	1–1	Marske United (10)	87
replay	Marske United (10)	2–0	Hebburn Town (10)	121
15	Whitehaven (10)	4–1	Team Northumbria (10)	66
16	Esh Winning (9)	0–4	Northallerton Town (10)	71
17	Pontefract Collieries (10)	0–2	Selby Town (9)	160
18	Silsden (9)	2–2	Crook Town (10)	228
replay	Crook Town (10)	1–0	Silsden (9)	190
19	Hall Road Rangers (9)	2–2	Newcastle Benfield (9)	72
replay	Newcastle Benfield (9)	3–1	Hall Road Rangers (9)	84
20	Bridlington Town (9)	5–1	Horden Colliery Welfare (10)	167
21	Stokesley (9)	1–1	Thackley (9)	70
replay	Thackley (9)	2–1	Stokesley (9)	92
22	Leeds Carnegie (10)	0–0	Billingham Synthonia (9)	23
replay	Billingham Synthonia (9)	3–1	Leeds Carnegie (10)	134
23	Spennymoor Town (9)	1–0	Bedlington Terriers (9)	262
24	Morpeth Town (10)	1–2	AFC Emley (10)	85
25	Seaham Red Star (10)	0–1	North Shields (10)	51
26	Irlam (10)	1–2	Chadderton (10)	56
27	Rossendale United (9)	3–1	Formby (9)	71
28	Ashton Athletic (9)	0–2	Parkgate (9)	35
29	Hallam (9)	2–3	Atherton Collieries (10)	195
30	Ramsbottom United (9)	4–1	Winsford United (9)	147
31	Leek County School Old Boys (10)	1–1	Bootle (9)	42
replay	Bootle (9)	6–0	Leek County School Old Boys (10)	124
32	New Mills (9)	10–2	Alsager Town (9)	125
33	Holker Old Boys (10)	1–1	Abbey Hey (10)	46
replay	Abbey Hey (10)	0–1	Holker Old Boys (10)	40
34	Daisy Hill (10)	0–8	Congleton Town (9)	54
35	Glossop North End (9)	2–2	Wigan Robin Park (10)	223
replay	Wigan Robin Park (10)	0–1	Glossop North End (9)	115
36	Runcorn Linnets (9)	1–1	Maine Road (9)	453
replay	Maine Road (9)	3–4	Runcorn Linnets (9)	140
37	Nelson	w/o	Atherton Laburnum Rovers (9)	N/A
Walkover for Atherton Laburnum Rovers – Nelson removed for late payment of entry fee
38	Staveley Miners Welfare (10)	5–0	Padiham (9)	90
39	Flixton (9)	0–3	Bacup Borough (9)	45
40	Nostell Miners Welfare (9)	1–1	St. Helens Town (9)	67
replay	St. Helens Town (9)	2–2 (5–4 p)	Nostell Miners Welfare (9)	74
41	Colne (9)	2–0	Ashton Town (10)	83
42	Cheadle Town (10)	3–0	Squires Gate (9)	45
43	Hemsworth Miners Welfare (10)	4–1	AFC Liverpool (10)	252
44	Willenhall Town (9)	0–6	Bartley Green (10)	75
45	Coalville Town (9)	1–1	Stone Dominoes (9)	94
replay	Stone Dominoes (9)	0–3	Coalville Town (9)	77
46	Loughborough University (9)	1–4	Stratford Town (9)	84
47	Boldmere St. Michaels (9)	0–1	Westfields (9)	42
48	Coventry Sphinx (9)	3–0	Castle Vale (10)	69
49	Pegasus Juniors (9)	1–1	Heather St. John's (10)	68
replay	Heather St. John's (10)	5–1	Pegasus Juniors (9)	86
50	Causeway United (9)	2–1	Ellesmere Rangers (9)	92
51	Rocester (9)	1–2	Pilkington XXX (10)	79
52	Eccleshall (10)	3–0	Southam United (10)	56
53	Cradley Town (10)	3–4	Malvern Town (9)	52
54	Shifnal Town (10)	1–1	Dudley Town (10)	63
replay	Dudley Town (10)	2–0	Shifnal Town (10)	87
55	Kirby Muxloe (9)	4–2	Walsall Wood (10)	92
56	Alvechurch (9)	0–5	Tipton Town (9)	59
57	Bardon Hill (10)	2–5	Bewdley Town (10)	51
58	Tividale (10)	1–2	Oadby Town (9)	40
59	Pelsall Villa (10)	0–2	Dosthill Colts (10)	50
60	Bridgnorth Town (9)	4–0	Highgate United (9)	90
61	Ledbury Town	w/o	Castle Vale JKS (10)	N/A
Walkover for Castle Vale JKS – Ledbury Town removed for failing ground standards
62	AFC Wulfrunians (10)	1–3	Heath Hayes (9)	83
63	Brocton (10)	4–4	Coleshill Town (9)	57
replay	Coleshill Town (9)	2–1	Brocton (10)	59
64	Nuneaton Griff (10)	2–1	Studley (9)	61
65	Norton United (10)	3–0	Hinckley (10)	22
66	Biddulph Victoria (9)	1–1	Wellington (Herefords) (10)	79
replay	Wellington (Herefords) (10)	1–1 (3–4 p)	Biddulph Victoria (9)	76
67	Wednesfield (10)	2–0	Bolehall Swifts (10)	52
68	Gedling Town (10)	2–4	Boston Town (9)	74
69	Blackstones (9)	1–1	Maltby Main (9)	70
replay	Maltby Main (9)	0–0 (4–3 p)	Blackstones (9)	110
70	Heanor Town (10)	0–0	Borrowash Victoria (10)	133
replay	Borrowash Victoria (10)	2–1	Heanor Town (10)	117
71	Long Eaton United (9)	1–1	Barton Town Old Boys (10)	68
replay	Barton Town Old Boys (10)	1–0	Long Eaton United (9)	115
72	Holbeach United (9)	0–1	Radcliffe Olympic (10)	124
73	Wisbech Town (9)	5–0	St. Andrews (10)	63
74	Rossington Main (10)	0–3	Shirebrook Town (10)	75
75	Greenwood Meadows (10)	2–4	Winterton Rangers (9)	36
76	Teversal (10)	0–0	Bottesford Town (10)	68
replay	Bottesford Town (10)	3–1	Teversal (10)	85
77	Barrow Town (10)	2–1	Arnold Town (9)	90
78	Dunkirk (9)	4–3	Dinnington Town (9)	72
79	Gedling Miners Welfare (10)	2–2	Holwell Sports (10)	68
replay	Holwell Sports (10)	3–4	Gedling Miners Welfare (10)	149
80	Holbrook Sports (10)	4–0	Sleaford Town (9)	61
81	Lincoln Moorlands Railway (9)	3–1	Friar Lane & Epworth (9)	61
82	Deeping Rangers (9)	0–2	Gresley (10)	139
83	Haverhill Rovers (9)	2–1	Hadleigh United (9)	178
84	Diss Town (10)	1–2	Daventry United	111
85	Brantham Athletic (9)	4–2	Woodbridge Town (9)	81
86	St. Neots Town (9)	2–0	Dereham Town (9)	299
87	Potton United (10)	1–2	Stewarts & Lloyds Corby (9)	81
88	Newmarket Town (9)	3–0	Yaxley (9)	73
89	Whitton United (10)	1–1	Thetford Town (10)	64
replay	Thetford Town (10)	0–2	Whitton United (10)	68
90	Northampton Spencer (9)	0–2	Leiston (9)	93
91	Wellingborough Town (9)	3–0	Kirkley & Pakefield (9)	85
92	Walsham-le-Willows (9)	1–4	Long Buckby (9)	65
93	Team Bury (10)	2–1	Ampthill Town (10)	110
94	Ely City (9)	4–0	Raunds Town (9)	82
95	Wroxham (9)	5–1	Rothwell Corinthians (9)	95
96	Felixstowe & Walton United (9)	4–1	Mildenhall Town (9)	91

Tie	Home team (tier)	Score	Away team (tier)	Att.
97	Great Yarmouth Town (9)	0–4	Norwich United (9)	120
98	March Town United (10)	1–0	Gorleston (10)	85
99	St. Ives Town (9)	2–3	Cogenhoe United (9)	97
100	Rothwell Town (10)	3–4	Desborough Town (9)	243
101	Godmanchester Rovers (10)	1–1	AFC Kempston Rovers (10)	84
replay	AFC Kempston Rovers (10)	4–0	Godmanchester Rovers (10)	68
102	St. Margaretsbury (9)	2–1	Welwyn Garden City (10)	48
103	Biggleswade United (9)	1–4	Newport Pagnell Town (9)	52
104	Saffron Walden Town (10)	3–2	Mauritius Sports Association (9)	126
105	Hadley (9)	0–0	Barking (9)	146
replay	Barking (9)	1–0	Hadley (9)	105
106	Kentish Town (9)	1–0	Stansted (9)	35
107	Chalfont St. Peter (9)	1–0	Stotfold (9)	66
108	Clapton (9)	0–4	Stanway Rovers (9)	70
109	Burnham Ramblers (9)	2–1	Hoddesdon Town (10)	83
110	Oxhey Jets (9)	3–2	Hatfield Town (9)	62
111	Bethnal Green United (9)	4–0	Basildon United (9)	76
112	Bowers & Pitsea (9)	4–1	Dunstable Town (9)	63
113	Takeley (9)	0–4	Hertford Town (9)	185
114	Cockfosters (10)	2–1	Hullbridge Sports (9)	65
115	Kingsbury London Tigers (9)	1–2	FC Clacton (9)	31
116	Witham Town (9)	3–0	Wembley (9)	70
117	Colney Heath (9)	3–0	Broxbourne Borough V&E (9)	76
118	Langford (9)	1–3	Aylesbury United (9)	68
119	Tring Athletic	2–0	Enfield 1893 (9)	126
120	Leverstock Green (9)	1–2	Harefield United (9)	56
121	Haringey Borough (9)	3–0	Hillingdon Borough (9)	62
122	London APSA (9)	3–3	Halstead Town (10)	48
replay	Halstead Town (10)	2–0	London APSA (9)	84
123	Hanwell Town (9)	1–3	London Colney (10)	61
124	Royston Town (9)	1–2	Crawley Green Sports (10)	130
125	Eton Manor (9)	3–0	Bedford (10)	12
126	Barkingside (9)	0–2	Southend Manor (9)	106
127	Cobham (10)	2–0	Wick (9)	55
128	Hassocks (9)	7–1	Eastbourne United Association (9)	72
129	Farnham Town (10)	2–1	Badshot Lea (9)	75
130	Molesey (9)	0–2	Hartley Wintney (10)	62
131	Croydon (9)	5–2	Crowborough Athletic (9)	87
132	Chessington & Hook United (9)	1–2	Raynes Park Vale (9)	54
133	Alresford Town (9)	5–2	Herne Bay (9)	72
134	St. Francis Rangers (9)	1–3	Banstead Athletic (9)	132
135	Sidley United (9)	0–3	Lancing (10)	73
136	Binfield (9)	3–2	Crawley Down (9)	90
137	Horley Town (9)	4–1	Ash United (9)	67
138	East Grinstead Town (9)	2–0	Holyport (10)	103
139	Camberley Town (9)	2–1	Petersfield Town (10)	60
140	Cove (9)	1–1	Three Bridges (9)	50
replay	Three Bridges (9)	4–1	Cove (9)	48
141	Alton Town (9)	4–1	Chichester City (9)	75
142	Erith Town (9)	2–1	Colliers Wood United (9)	42
143	Arundel (9)	4–1	Hailsham Town (9)	96
144	Greenwich Borough (9)	1–2	South Park (10)	134
145	Epsom & Ewell (9)	3–0	Shoreham (9)	67
146	Holmesdale (9)	0–2	Erith & Belvedere (9)	97
147	Mile Oak (10)	0–1	Tunbridge Wells (9)	77
148	Egham Town (9)	1–3	Guildford City (9)	70
149	Littlehampton Town (10)	1–1	Beckenham Town (9)	71
replay	Beckenham Town (9)	3–0	Littlehampton Town (10)	71
150	Hythe Town (9)	4–0	Bookham (9)	169
151	Selsey (9)	1–4	Worthing United (10)	128
152	Lordswood (9)	1–5	Pagham (9)	67
153	Norton Sports (9)	2–0	Redhill (9)	63
154	Flackwell Heath (9)	2–1	Oakwood (10)	58
155	Deal Town (9)	3–0	Sandhurst Town (9)	94
156	Frimley Green (10)	0–4	Peacehaven & Telscombe (9)	63
157	Lingfield (9)	1–0	Sevenoaks Town (9)	101
158	Dorking (9)	0–5	Bracknell Town (9)	73
159	Mole Valley SCR (9)	0–5	Chertsey Town (9)	179
160	VCD Athletic (9)	3–1	AFC Uckfield (10)	71
161	East Preston (10)	1–4	Ringmer (9)	82
162	Brading Town (9)	1–1	Romsey Town (9)	72
replay	Romsey Town (9)	0–4	Brading Town (9)	58
163	Bradford Town (10)	1–1	Wootton Bassett Town (9)	70
replay	Wootton Bassett Town (9)	3–3 (4–3 p)	Bradford Town (10)	82
164	Fairford Town (9)	0–0	Lydney Town (10)	49
replay	Lydney Town (10)	3–1	Fairford Town (9)	101
165	Christchurch (9)	0–1	Hamble ASSC (9)	55
166	Ringwood Town (10)	5–0	Cowes Sports (10)	118
167	Thame United (9)	3–0	Shrivenham (9)	24
168	Hayling United (9)	1–2	Blackfield & Langley (9)	74
169	Lymington Town (9)	1–3	Moneyfields (9)	101
170	Highworth Town (9)	2–1	Melksham Town (10)	145
171	Bournemouth (9)	1–0	Abingdon Town (9)	67
172	Totton & Eling (9)	2–0	Bemerton Heath Harlequins (9)	126
173	Wantage Town (9)	2–3	Shortwood United (9)	67
174	Downton (10)	0–2	Bitton (9)	64
175	Hallen (9)	4–1	Winchester City (9)	154
176	Milton United (10)	0–2	Witney United (9)	115
177	Bristol Manor Farm (9)	5–3	Ardley United (9)	41
178	Calne Town (10)	2–1	Corsham Town (9)	122
Walkover for Corsham Town – Calne Town removed for fielding ineligible player
179	Amesbury Town (10)	0–5	Almondsbury UWE (10)	77
180	Newport Isle of Wight (9)	1–0	Kidlington (9)	172
181	New Milton Town (9)	1–1	Longwell Green Sports (9)	37
replay	Longwell Green Sports (9)	3–2	New Milton Town (9)	58
182	Bicester Town (10)	0–2	Westbury United (10)	46
183	Warminster Town (10)	1–2	Reading Town (9)	159
184	Fareham Town (9)	3–1	Clanfield (10)	89
185	Hook Norton (10)	1–6	Laverstock & Ford (9)	35
186	Brockenhurst (9)	0–1	Old Woodstock Town (9)	90
187	Larkhall Athletic (9)	5–1	Gillingham Town (10)	78
188	Bridport (10)	3–0	Welton Rovers (9)	128
189	Launceston (10)	0–3	Bodmin Town (10)	104
190	Willand Rovers (9)	2–0	Merthyr Town (10)	144
191	Sherborne Town (9)	2–1	Portishead Town (10)	85
192	Elmore (10)	1–5	Hamworthy United (9)	247
193	St. Blazey (10)	1–1	Torpoint Athletic (10)	143
replay	Torpoint Athletic (10)	5–1	St. Blazey (10)	222
194	Odd Down (9)	1–1	Verwood Town (10)	46
replay	Verwood Town (10)	1–4	Odd Down (9)	106
195	Street (9)	4–1	Barnstaple Town (9)	92
196	Buckland Athletic (10)	4–4	Radstock Town (9)	145
replay	Radstock Town (9)	3–2	Buckland Athletic (10)	130
197	Brislington (9)	0–1	Wellington (Somerset) (9)	45
198	Keynsham Town (10)	0–2	Tavistock (10)	61
199	Saltash United (10)	1–1	Bishop Sutton (9)	78
replay	Bishop Sutton (9)	4–4 (4–3 p)	Saltash United (10)	84
200	Poole Town (9)	3–0	Dawlish Town (9)	202
201	Ilfracombe Town (9)	4–4	Falmouth Town (10)	108
replay	Falmouth Town (10)	1–2	Ilfracombe Town (9)	175

== Preliminary round ==
Preliminary Round fixtures were played on the weekend of 28 August 2010. A total of 332 clubs took part in this stage of the competition, including the 201 winners from the Extra Preliminary Round, Ashford Town, who were without a league to compete but were included in a draw, and 130 entering at this stage from the six leagues at Level 8 of English football, except three clubs: Chester who was ineligible to participate as they only spent their second season, Leyton, who decided not to participate, and Grays Athletic, who get a bye to the next stage. The round featured 55 clubs from Level 10 still in the competition, being the lowest-ranked teams in this round.

Tie	Home team (tier)	Score	Away team (tier)	Att.
1	Spennymoor Town (9)	2–0	Crook Town (10)	
2	Selby Town (9)	0–4	Ossett Albion (8)	113
3	Chester-le-Street Town (10)	2–1	Scarborough Athletic (9)	203
4	South Shields (9)	1–1	Dunston UTS (9)	
replay	Dunston UTS (9)	3–0	South Shields (9)	
5	Newcastle Benfield (9)	3–3	North Shields (10)	150
replay	North Shields (10)	0–1	Newcastle Benfield (9)	211
6	Armthorpe Welfare (9)	2–4	Marske United (10)	74
7	Wakefield (8)	2–3	Ashington (9)	141
8	AFC Emley (10)	0–1	Northallerton Town (10)	141
9	Garforth Town (8)	0–1	Tadcaster Albion (9)	94
10	Jarrow Roofing BCA (9)	1–2	Durham City (8)	102
11	Thackley (9)	5–0	Harrogate Railway Athletic (8)	146
12	Billingham Synthonia (9)	0–3	West Auckland Town (9)	91
13	Shildon (9)	1–0	Bridlington Town (9)	153
14	Whitehaven (10)	1–5	Norton & Stockton Ancients (9)	
15	Bishop Auckland (9)	2–2	Whitley Bay (9)	292
replay	Whitley Bay (9)	3–1	Bishop Auckland (9)	385
16	Radcliffe Borough (8)	2–1	Lancaster City (8)	128
17	Hemsworth Miners Welfare (10)	0–0	Bamber Bridge (8)	135
replay	Bamber Bridge (8)	4–1	Hemsworth Miners Welfare (10)	166
18	Holker Old Boys (10)	0–2	Trafford (8)	67
19	Curzon Ashton (8)	0–0	Congleton Town (9)	107
replay	Congleton Town (9)	1–2 (a.e.t.)	Curzon Ashton (8)	186
20	Cheadle Town (10)	1–3	Ramsbottom United (9)	66
21	Skelmersdale United (8)	3–1	AFC Fylde (8)	167
22	New Mills (9)	3–1	Chadderton (10)	127
23	Bacup Borough (9)	5–3	Clitheroe (8)	101
24	Staveley Miners Welfare (10)	1–3	Parkgate (9)	110
25	Bootle (9)	1–2	Warrington Town (8)	223
26	Atherton Collieries (10)	2–2	Prescot Cables (8)	70
replay	Prescot Cables (8)	2–0	Atherton Collieries (10)	104
27	St. Helens Town (9)	1–1	Glossop North End (9)	113
replay	Glossop North End (9)	2–1	St. Helens Town (9)	
28	Sheffield (8)	3–1	Colne (9)	199
29	Leigh Genesis (8)	1–0	Runcorn Linnets (9)	173
30	Salford City (8)	2–1	Chorley (8)	236
31	Atherton Laburnum Rovers (9)	0–0	Woodley Sports (8)	134
replay	Woodley Sports (8)	3–0	Atherton Laburnum Rovers (9)	77
32	Rossendale United (9)	5–2	Cammell Laird (8)	91
33	Mossley (8)	2–0	Witton Albion (8)	221
34	Rugby Town (8)	1–1	Atherstone Town (8)	332
replay	Atherstone Town (8)	0–3	Rugby Town (8)	222
35	Castle Vale JKS (10)	3–3	Wednesfield (10)	
replay	Wednesfield (10)	6–0	Castle Vale JKS (10)	
36	Pilkington XXX (10)	w/o	Bromsgrove Rovers (8)	N/A
Walkover for Pilkington XXX – Bromsgrove Rovers folded
37	Leek Town (8)	0–1	Eccleshall (10)	210
38	Bridgnorth Town (9)	1–1	Coventry Sphinx (9)	85
replay	Coventry Sphinx (9)	1–0	Bridgnorth Town (9)	113
39	Kidsgrove Athletic (8)	0–0	Biddulph Victoria (9)	168
replay	Biddulph Victoria (9)	0–4	Kidsgrove Athletic (8)	162
40	Causeway United (9)	2–2	Bartley Green (10)	
replay	Bartley Green (10)	4–2 (a.e.t.)	Causeway United (9)	107
41	Bewdley Town (10)	2–3	Sutton Coldfield Town (8)	107
42	Tipton Town (9)	3–1	Stratford Town (9)	84
43	Heather St. John's (10)	2–3	Coleshill Town (9)	
44	Westfields (9)	0–2	Market Drayton Town (8)	92
45	Oadby Town (9)	2–0	Malvern Town (9)	
46	Stourport Swifts (8)	3–3	Dosthill Colts (10)	79
replay	Dosthill Colts (10)	1–0	Stourport Swifts (8)	85
47	Bedworth United (8)	6–1	Dudley Town (10)	146
48	Rushall Olympic (8)	0–0	Romulus (8)	83
replay	Romulus (8)	4–2	Rushall Olympic (8)	103
49	Kirby Muxloe (9)	1–3	Norton United (10)	53
50	Coalville Town (9)	5–1	Heath Hayes (9)	86
51	Newcastle Town (8)	5–0	Nuneaton Griff (10)	73
52	Lincoln United (8)	2–2	Boston Town (9)	83
replay	Boston Town (9)	2–4	Lincoln United (8)	132
53	Bottesford Town (10)	2–1	Barrow Town (10)	76
54	Loughborough Dynamo (8)	1–1	Shepshed Dynamo (8)v	191
replay	Shepshed Dynamo (8)	2–3	Loughborough Dynamo (8)	299
55	Gresley (10)	4–0	Quorn (8)	203
56	Barton Town Old Boys (10)	1–4	Shirebrook Town (10)	83
57	Dunkirk (9)	2–2	Grantham Town (8)	123
replay	Grantham Town (8)	2–3 (a.e.t.)	Dunkirk (9)	190
58	Spalding United (8)	1–0	Goole (8)	101
59	Brigg Town (8)	6–2	Rainworth Miners Welfare (8)	108
60	Maltby Main (9)	0–1	Winterton Rangers (9)	45
61	Glapwell (8)	0–6	Lincoln Moorlands Railway (9)	107
62	Carlton Town (8)	2–1	Borrowash Victoria (10)	75
63	Gedling Miners Welfare (10)	0–1	Barwell (8)	75
64	Radcliffe Olympic (10)	1–0	Wisbech Town (9)	166
65	Belper Town (8)	1–3	Holbrook Sports (10)	173
66	Long Buckby (9)	4–1	Daventry United	
67	Norwich United (9)	2–2	AFC Kempston Rovers (10)	86
replay	AFC Kempston Rovers (10)	3–2	Norwich United (9)	88
68	Wellingborough Town (9)	1–1	Haverhill Rovers (9)	
replay	Haverhill Rovers (9)	1–3	Wellingborough Town (9)	
69	Daventry Town (8)	2–3	Needham Market (8)	102
70	Whitton United (10)	0–3	Woodford United (8)	34
71	Stewarts & Lloyds Corby (9)	2–1	Soham Town Rangers (8)	70
72	AFC Sudbury (8)	2–2	Stamford (8)	260
replay	Stamford (8)	2–1	AFC Sudbury (8)	227
73	March Town United (10)	1–2	Desborough Town (9)	106
74	Felixstowe & Walton United (9)	2–1	Team Bury (10)	158
75	Wroxham (9)	2–2	Ely City (9)	88
replay	Ely City (9)	1–1 (4–3 p)	Wroxham (9)	133
76	Cogenhoe United (9)	0–3	Leiston (9)	89
77	Newmarket Town (9)	1–5	Biggleswade Town (8)	83
78	Brantham Athletic (9)	1–2	St. Neots Town (9)	143
79	North Greenford United (8)	4–3	Bowers & Pitsea (9)	56
80	Arlesey Town (8)	1–1	Aylesbury (8)	135
replay	Aylesbury (8)	1–2 (a.e.t.)	Arlesey Town (8)	138

Tie	Home team (tier)	Score	Away team (tier)	Att.
81	Witham Town (9)	0–0	Ilford (8)	80
replay	Ilford (8)	0–0 (3–2 p)	Witham Town (9)	92
82	Kentish Town (9)	1–3	Bethnal Green United (9)	70
83	Crawley Green (10)	2–0	Harefield United (9)	47
84	Barking (9)	0–1	Redbridge (8)	106
85	Waltham Forest (8)	0–3	Enfield Town (8)	119
86	Hitchin Town (8)	2–1	Ware (8)	234
87	Halstead Town (10)	1–2	Stanway Rovers (9)	153
88	Burnham Ramblers (9)	5–1	Haringey Borough (9)	34
89	Oxhey Jets (9)	4–1	St. Margaretsbury (9)	51
90	Burnham (8)	2–1	Chalfont St. Peter (9)	86
91	Marlow (8)	1–2	London Colney (10)	98
92	Uxbridge (8)	0–1	Tilbury (8)	60
93	Tring Athletic (9)	3–2	AFC Hayes (8)	126
94	Southend Manor (9)	0–4	Brentwood Town (8)	82
95	Newport Pagnell Town (9)	3–2	Potters Bar Town (8)	101
96	Colney Heath (9)	0–0	FC Clacton (9)	87
replay	FC Clacton (9)	1–5	Colney Heath (9)	108
97	Harlow Town (8)	1–0	Barton Rovers (8)	183
98	Aylesbury United (9)	3–2	Eton Manor (9)	117
99	Maldon & Tiptree (8)	4–2	Hertford Town (9)	63
100	Romford (8)	3–1	Beaconsfield SYCOB (8)	120
101	Leighton Town (8)	2–2	Heybridge Swifts (8)	110
replay	Heybridge Swifts (8)	0–1	Leighton Town (8)	115
102	East Thurrock United (8)	3–0	Waltham Abbey (8)	100
103	Cheshunt (8)	2–2	Cockfosters (10)	156
replay	Cockfosters (10)	1–2	Cheshunt (8)	74
104	Saffron Walden Town (10)	1–1	Great Wakering Rovers (8)	155
replay	Great Wakering Rovers (8)	3–1	Saffron Walden Town (10)	101
105	Wingate & Finchley (8)	0–0	Northwood (8)	116
replay	Northwood (8)	3–1	Wingate & Finchley (8)	137
106	Thamesmead Town (8)	2–3	Beckenham Town (9)	59
107	Binfield (9)	5–1	Camberley Town (9)	164
108	AFC Totton (8)	1–2	Sholing (8)	254
109	Norton Sports (9)	2–0	Banstead Athletic (9)	57
110	Hartley Wintney (10)	2–2	Whitehawk (8)	110
replay	Whitehawk (8)	4–0	Hartley Wintney (10)	120
111	Fleet Town (8)	4–0	Bedfont Town (8)	67
112	Lingfield (9)	0–2	Corinthian-Casuals (8)	60
113	Epsom & Ewell (9)	3–2	Flackwell Heath (9)	59
114	Deal Town (9)	2–4	Hythe Town (9)	189
115	Whitstable Town (8)	3–0	Croydon (9)	101
116	Cobham (10)	2–2	Alresford Town (9)	
replay	Alresford Town (9)	0–4	Cobham (10)	
117	Leatherhead (8)	0–2	Burgess Hill Town (8)	131
118	Peacehaven & Telscombe (9)	1–2	Ashford Town (Middlesex) (8)	75
119	Chipstead (8)	4–3	Whyteleafe (8)	184
120	Guildford City (9)	2–1	Three Bridges (9)	
121	Ramsgate (8)	1–1	Godalming Town (8)	171
replay	Godalming Town (8)	3–0	Ramsgate (8)	137
122	Walton & Hersham (8)	3–0	Bracknell Town (9)	95
123	Ashford Town (Kent)	w/o	Erith Town (9)	N/A
Walkover for Erith Town – Ashford Town (Kent) withdrew
124	Faversham Town (8)	2–0	Pagham (9)	122
125	Chertsey Town (9)	2–1	Chatham Town (8)	152
126	Alton Town (9)	2–1	Merstham (8)	95
127	Raynes Park Vale (9)	1–4	East Grinstead Town (9)	62
128	VCD Athletic (9)	1–1	Eastbourne Town (8)	90
replay	Eastbourne Town (8)	2–1 (a.e.t.)	VCD Athletic (9)	141
129	Walton Casuals (8)	3–0	Worthing United (10)	75
130	Horley Town (9)	0–6	Metropolitan Police (8)	115
131	Sittingbourne (8)	0–1	Andover (8)	108
132	Tunbridge Wells (9)	3–3	Dulwich Hamlet (8)	172
replay	Dulwich Hamlet (8)	0–1	Tunbridge Wells (9)	189
133	Lancing (10)	1–4	Slough Town (8)	214
134	Hassocks (9)	3–2	Farnham Town (10)	90
135	Bognor Regis Town (8)	1–0	Ringmer (9)	244
136	Worthing (8)	6–0	Arundel (9)	313
137	South Park (10)	4–0	Horsham YMCA (8)	160
138	Gosport Borough (8)	0–0	Erith & Belvedere (9)	131
replay	Erith & Belvedere (9)	2–1	Gosport Borough (8)	125
139	Old Woodstock Town (9)	6–3	Laverstock & Ford (9)	32
140	Bitton (9)	2–0	Fareham Town (9)	113
141	Reading Town (9)	1–4	Newport Isle of Wight (9)	50
142	Almondsbury UWE (10)	0–1	Wootton Bassett Town (9)	62
143	Blackfield & Langley (9)	0–2	Almondsbury Town (8)	48
144	Bournemouth (9)	0–2	Highworth Town (9)	100
145	Cinderford Town (8)	2–1	North Leigh (8)	89
146	Hallen (9)	3–4	Bristol Manor Farm (9)	89
147	Hungerford Town (8)	2–1	Moneyfields (9)	85
148	Corsham Town (9)	0–1	Brading Town (9)	85
149	Bishop's Cleeve (8)	4–0	Westbury United (10)	74
150	Thatcham Town (8)	2–2	Witney United (9)	105
replay	Witney United (9)	2–4	Thatcham Town (8)	139
151	Thame United (9)	2–1	Lydney Town (10)	27
152	Ringwood Town (10)	4–1	Yate Town (8)	92
153	Mangotsfield United (8)	5–0	Abingdon United (8)	158
154	Totton & Eling (9)	0–0	Shortwood United (9)	78
replay	Shortwood United (9)	1–3 (a.e.t.)	Totton & Eling (9)	135
155	Longwell Green Sports (9)	0–3	Hamble ASSC (9)	61
156	Bridgwater Town (8)	1–0	Street (9)	204
157	Frome Town (8)	1–0	Ilfracombe Town (9)	179
158	Bideford (8)	1–2	Wimborne Town	205
159	Willand Rovers (9)	1–0	Radstock Town (9)	107
160	Paulton Rovers (8)	4–1	Larkhall Athletic (9)	169
161	Bridport (10)	0–6	Clevedon Town (8)	187
162	Wellington (Somerset) (9)	0–3	Bodmin Town (10)	116
163	Torpoint Athletic (10)	1–1	Odd Down (9)	
replay	Odd Down (9)	0–1	Torpoint Athletic (10)	84
164	Poole Town (9)	3–0	Bishop Sutton (9)	198
165	Hamworthy United (9)	2–2	Sherborne Town (9)	
replay	Sherborne Town (9)	3–0	Hamworthy United (9)	
166	Tavistock (10)	1–2	Taunton Town (8)	98

== First round qualifying ==
The first round qualifying fixtures were played on the weekend of 11 September 2010, with replays being played the following mid-week. A total of 232 clubs took part in this stage of the competition, including the 166 winners from the preliminary round, 65 entering at this stage from the top division of the three leagues at Level 7 of English football and Grays Athletic, while Halesowen Town from Southern League Premier Division missing this years competition due to ownership issues. The round featured 21 clubs from Level 10 still in the competition, being the lowest-ranked clubs in this round.

Tie	Home team (tier)	Score	Away team (tier)	Att.
1	Tadcaster Albion (9)	1–1	Shildon (9)	191
replay	Shildon (9)	4–2 (a.e.t.)	Tadcaster Albion (9)	
2	Ossett Albion (8)	1–2	Whitley Bay (9)	194
3	Durham City (8)	1–3	Dunston UTS (9)	145
4	North Ferriby United (7)	2–1	Ossett Town (7)	112
5	Ashington (9)	3–1	Northallerton Town (10)	
6	Norton & Stockton Ancients (9)	2–1	Chester-le-Street Town (10)	
7	West Auckland Town (9)	3–1	Bradford Park Avenue (7)	180
8	Newcastle Benfield (9)	1–0	Spennymoor Town (9)	
9	Thackley (9)	3–1	Marske United (10)	201
10	FC Halifax Town (7)	2–0	Whitby Town (7)	976
11	F.C. United of Manchester (7)	3–0	Radcliffe Borough (8)	1,144
12	Parkgate (9)	1–3	Warrington Town (8)	122
13	Nantwich Town (7)	4–0	Burscough (7)	247
14	Salford City (8)	0–1	Northwich Victoria (7)	220
15	Curzon Ashton (8)	1–1	New Mills (9)	184
replay	New Mills (9)	3–2	Curzon Ashton (8)	320
16	Prescot Cables (8)	2–2	Ashton United	142
replay	Ashton United	4–0	Prescot Cables (8)	109
17	Frickley Athletic (7)	3–2	Kendal Town (7)	185
18	Marine (7)	1–1	Colwyn Bay (7)	312
replay	Colwyn Bay (7)	2–0	Marine (7)	
19	Bamber Bridge (8)	2–0	Bacup Borough (9)	152
20	Rossendale United (9)	3–4	Leigh Genesis (8)	84
21	Stocksbridge Park Steels (7)	4–2	Trafford (8)	120
22	Glossop North End (9)	0–4	Mossley (8)	354
23	Ramsbottom United (9)	0–2	Skelmersdale United (8)	164
24	Woodley Sports (8)	2–2	Sheffield (8)	100
replay	Sheffield (8)	3–1	Woodley Sports (8)	
25	Wednesfield (10)	5–1	Rugby Town (8)	149
26	Stourbridge (7)	2–0	Romulus (8)	244
27	Evesham United (7)	1–3	Coleshill Town (9)	89
28	Leamington (7)	2–2	Brackley Town (7)	532
replay	Brackley Town (7)	2–0	Leamington (7)	
29	Pilkington XXX (10)	0–2	Market Drayton Town (8)	91
30	Oadby Town (9)	2–1	Dosthill Colts (10)	65
31	Coventry Sphinx (9)	1–0	Sutton Coldfield Town (8)	110
32	Tipton Town (9)	1–0	Norton United (10)	56
33	Kidsgrove Athletic (8)	3–0	Chasetown (7)	230
34	Coalville Town (9)	5–0	Eccleshall (10)	138
35	Bartley Green (10)	1–1	Bedworth United (8)	111
replay	Bedworth United (8)	4–0	Bartley Green (10)	
36	Hednesford Town (7)	1–2	Newcastle Town (8)	305
37	Winterton Rangers (9)	2–2	Radcliffe Olympic (10)	85
replay	Radcliffe Olympic (10)	2–0	Winterton Rangers (9)	
38	Bottesford Town (10)	0–3	Buxton (7)	135
39	Lincoln Moorlands Railway (9)	2–2	Gresley (10)	147
replay	Gresley (10)	1–2	Lincoln Moorlands Railway (9)	
40	Matlock Town (7)	3–1	Worksop Town (7)	428
41	Spalding United (8)	2–2	Brigg Town (8)	103
replay	Brigg Town (8)	4–0	Spalding United (8)	
42	Holbrook Sports (10)	1–3	Loughborough Dynamo (8)	121
43	Barwell (8)	2–0	Hucknall Town (7)	163
44	Shirebrook Town (10)	1–3	Lincoln United (8)	119
45	Carlton Town (8)	1–1	Dunkirk (9)	127
replay	Dunkirk (9)	1–2 (a.e.t.)	Carlton Town (8)	
46	Retford United (7)	0–5	Mickleover Sports (7)	144
47	Cambridge City (7)	3–0	Long Buckby (9)	270
48	Lowestoft Town (7)	7–1	Desborough Town (9)	566
49	Ely City (9)	0–1	Stewarts & Lloyds Corby (9)	102
50	Woodford United (8)	1–3	Bury Town (7)	84
51	Felixstowe & Walton United (9)	2–1	Wellingborough Town (9)	191
52	Needham Market (8)	6–1	AFC Kempston Rovers (10)	204
53	Leiston (9)	3–2	St. Neots Town (9)	209
54	Biggleswade Town (8)	3–3	Stamford (8)	160
replay	Stamford (8)	3–0	Biggleswade Town (8)	
55	Great Wakering Rovers (8)	2–4	Harrow Borough (7)	95
56	Brentwood Town (8)	4–0	Aylesbury United (9)	142
57	Wealdstone (7)	7–0	Tring Athletic (9)	196
58	Hemel Hempstead Town (7)	1–2	Concord Rangers (7)	184

Tie	Home team (tier)	Score	Away team (tier)	Att.
59	Burnham (8)	2–1	Colney Heath (9)	109
60	Romford (8)	1–1	Crawley Green (10)	93
replay	Crawley Green (10)	1–2	Romford (8)	
61	North Greenford United (8)	2–1	Northwood (8)	134
62	Ilford (8)	0–1	Maldon & Tiptree (8)	66
63	AFC Hornchurch (7)	8–2	Oxhey Jets (9)	171
64	Canvey Island (7)	4–1	Newport Pagnell Town (9)	266
65	Redbridge (8)	2–0	London Colney (10)	72
66	Grays Athletic (8)	1–0	Windsor & Eton (7)	315
67	Stanway Rovers (9)	1–1	Bedford Town (7)	128
replay	Bedford Town (7)	2–0	Stanway Rovers (9)	
68	Arlesey Town (8)	0–2	Enfield Town (8)	186
69	Billericay Town (7)	1–0	Tilbury (8)	329
70	East Thurrock United (8)	2–1	Leighton Town (8)	110
71	Hendon (7)	4–1	Cheshunt (8)	182
72	Hitchin Town (8)	2–1	Aveley (7)	224
73	Harlow Town (8)	1–1	Bethnal Green United (9)	214
replay	Bethnal Green United (9)	0–4	Harlow Town (8)	173
74	Burnham Ramblers (9)	0–3	Chesham United (7)	115
75	Hythe Town (9)	2–0	Epsom & Ewell (9)	182
76	Sholing (8)	5–0	Hassocks (9)	85
77	Corinthian-Casuals (8)	1–2	Erith & Belvedere (9)	75
78	Cobham (10)	0–1	Chipstead (8)	50
79	Sutton United (7)	1–2	Alton Town (9)	298
80	Carshalton Athletic (7)	2–1	Tunbridge Wells (9)	250
81	Tonbridge Angels (7)	0–1	Guildford City (9)	385
82	Tooting & Mitcham United (7)	4–1	Walton Casuals (8)	221
83	Godalming Town (8)	1–2	Metropolitan Police (8)	142
84	Erith Town (9)	1–0	Slough Town (8)	140
85	Beckenham Town (9)	3–2	Norton Sports (9)	71
86	Burgess Hill Town (8)	3–2	Eastbourne Town (8)	165
87	Fleet Town (8)	3–1	Faversham Town (8)	124
88	Folkestone Invicta (7)	4–2	Horsham (7)	327
89	Kingstonian (7)	w/o	Croydon Athletic (7)	N/A
Walkover for Kingstonian – Croydon Athletic unable to field team
90	Whitstable Town (8)	1–0	East Grinstead Town (9)	199
91	Ashford Town (Middlesex) (8)	1–1	Worthing (8)	133
replay	Worthing (8)	5–1	Ashford Town (Middlesex) (8)	
92	Whitehawk (8)	3–1	Maidstone United (7)	
93	Cray Wanderers (7)	1–0	South Park (10)	217
94	Binfield (9)	0–3	Margate (7)	394
95	Bognor Regis Town (8)	3–2	Hastings United (7)	374
96	Walton & Hersham (8)	1–4	Bashley (7)	110
97	Andover (8)	0–4	Chertsey Town (9)	81
98	Bitton (9)	2–3	Old Woodstock Town (9)	94
99	Oxford City (7)	0–1	Mangotsfield United (8)	155
100	Swindon Supermarine (7)	4–0	Brading Town (9)	82
101	Banbury United (7)	1–2	Chippenham Town (7)	277
102	Newport Isle of Wight (9)	0–3	Bishop's Cleeve (8)	178
103	Thatcham Town (8)	0–1	Thame United (9)	110
104	Almondsbury Town (8)	1–1	Bristol Manor Farm (9)	100
replay	Bristol Manor Farm (9)	2–2 (3–1 p)	Almondsbury Town (8)	
105	Hungerford Town (8)	6–2	Totton & Eling (9)	81
106	Highworth Town (9)	1–1	Salisbury City (7)	422
replay	Salisbury City (7)	5–0	Highworth Town (9)	
107	Hamble ASSC (9)	1–1	Wootton Bassett Town (9)	94
replay	Wootton Bassett Town (9)	0–2	Hamble ASSC (9)	
108	Cinderford Town (8)	5–0	Ringwood Town (10)	79
109	Cirencester Town (7)	0–0	Didcot Town (7)	125
replay	Didcot Town (7)	3–2	Cirencester Town (7)	
110	Tiverton Town (7)	1–1	Paulton Rovers (8)	296
replay	Paulton Rovers (8)	2–0	Tiverton Town (7)	299
111	Truro City (7)	8–2	Bridgwater Town (8)	325
112	Torpoint Athletic (10)	2–4	Clevedon Town (8)	258
113	Wimborne Town (8)	1–3	Sherborne Town (9)	226
114	Bodmin Town (10)	1–4	Poole Town (9)	
115	Taunton Town (8)	1–2	Weymouth (7)	288
116	Frome Town (8)	1–0	Willand Rovers (9)	176

== Second round qualifying ==
The second round qualifying fixtures were played on the weekend of 25 September 2010. A total of 160 clubs took part in this stage of the competition, including the 116 winners from the first round qualifying and 44 Level 6 clubs, from Conference North and Conference South, entering at this stage. Radcliffe Olympic and Wednesfield from Level 10 of English football, were the lowest-ranked clubs to qualify for this round of the competition.

Tie	Home team (tier)	Score	Away team (tier)	Att.
1	Frickley Athletic (7)	2–1	Newcastle Benfield (9)	217
2	Bamber Bridge (8)	1–1	Warrington Town (8)	223
replay	Warrington Town (8)	4–2	Bamber Bridge (8)	236
3	Norton & Stockton Ancients (9)	2–1	Leigh Genesis (8)	127
4	New Mills (9)	0–2	Harrogate Town (6)	309
5	Vauxhall Motors (6)	5–1	Blyth Spartans (6)	216
6	North Ferriby United (7)	5–2	Stocksbridge Park Steels (7)	196
7	Dunston UTS (9)	1–2	Mossley (8)	248
8	Ashington (9)	1–0	Thackley (9)	336
9	Colwyn Bay (7)	1–1	Guiseley (6)	457
replay	Guiseley (6)	3–0	Colwyn Bay (7)	256
10	Nantwich Town (7)	2–3	Whitley Bay (9)	344
11	F.C. United of Manchester (7)	2–1	Gainsborough Trinity (6)	1,037
12	Hyde (6)	0–0	Droylsden (6)	375
replay	Droylsden (6)	3–1	Hyde (6)	354
13	Ashton United (7)	1–2	FC Halifax Town (7)	525
14	Stalybridge Celtic (6)	1–1	Alfreton Town (6)	373
replay	Alfreton Town (6)	1–2 (a.e.t.)	Stalybridge Celtic (6)	387
15	Shildon (9)	2–0	Skelmersdale United (8)	234
16	Sheffield (8)	2–2	Northwich Victoria (7)	422
replay	Northwich Victoria (7)	1–2	Sheffield (8)	429
17	Workington (6)	2–1	West Auckland Town (9)	413
18	Boston United (6)	2–3	Worcester City (6)	1,352
19	Ilkeston Town (6)	w/o	Lincoln Moorlands Railway (9)	N/A
Walkover for Lincoln Moorlands Railway – Ilkeston Town folded
20	Tipton Town (9)	2–0	Market Drayton Town (8)	72
21	Eastwood Town (6)	1–1	Stafford Rangers (6)	347
replay	Stafford Rangers (6)	1–3	Eastwood Town (6)	429
22	Brigg Town (8)	3–3	Nuneaton Town (6)	276
replay	Nuneaton Town (6)	2–0	Brigg Town (8)	545
23	Coleshill Town (9)	5–1	Lincoln United (8)	68
24	Hinckley United (6)	2–0	Coventry Sphinx (9)	301
25	Oadby Town (9)	1–3	Radcliffe Olympic (10)	135
26	Barwell (8)	3–2	Coalville Town (9)	307
27	Loughborough Dynamo (8)	0–2	Redditch United (6)	185
28	Stewarts & Lloyds Corby (9)	2–2	Mickleover Sports (7)	102
replay	Mickleover Sports (7)	3–2 (a.e.t.)	Stewarts & Lloyds Corby (9)	120
29	Brackley Town (7)	1–3	Buxton (7)	306
30	Carlton Town (8)	0–1	Matlock Town (7)	199
31	Bedworth United (8)	0–1	Corby Town (6)	241
32	Newcastle Town (8)	5–3	Wednesfield (10)	146
33	Solihull Moors (6)	2–0	Kidsgrove Athletic (8)	233
34	AFC Telford United (6)	5–2	Stourbridge (7)	1,447
35	Hythe Town (9)	4–1	Erith & Belvedere (9)	230
36	Erith Town (9)	1–5	Dover Athletic (6)	282
37	Bury Town (7)	2–2	Grays Athletic (8)	582
replay	Grays Athletic (8)	1–4	Bury Town (7)	268
38	Chesham United (7)	2–2	Wealdstone (7)	504
replay	Wealdstone (7)	4–1	Chesham United (7)	366
39	Braintree Town (6)	2–0	Welling United (6)	433
40	Tooting & Mitcham United (7)	1–4	Staines Town (6)	378
41	Bishop's Stortford (6)	2–2	Bromley (6)	357
replay	Bromley (6)	2–1	Bishop's Stortford (6)	347
42	Cambridge City (7)	2–2	Hitchin Town (8)	388
replay	Hitchin Town (8)	0–2	Cambridge City (7)	324

Tie	Home team (tier)	Score	Away team (tier)	Att.
43	Billericay Town (7)	1–1	Concord Rangers (7)	301
replay	Concord Rangers (7)	1–0 (a.e.t.)	Billericay Town (7)	283
44	Folkestone Invicta (7)	1–1	Leiston (9)	280
replay	Leiston (9)	2–1	Folkestone Invicta (7)	307
45	Lewes (6)	2–0	Harlow Town (8)	785
46	AFC Hornchurch (7)	0–0	Brentwood Town (8)	279
replay	Brentwood Town (8)	1–0	AFC Hornchurch (7)	213
47	East Thurrock United (8)	1–1	Carshalton Athletic (7)	163
replay	Carshalton Athletic (7)	3–2	East Thurrock United (8)	188
48	Hendon (7)	2–1	Maldon & Tiptree (8)	166
49	Enfield Town (8)	1–0	Worthing (8)	304
50	North Greenford United (8)	1–1	Felixstowe & Walton United (9)	118
replay	Felixstowe & Walton United (9)	0–3	North Greenford United (8)	305
51	Needham Market (8)	0–0	Chipstead (8)	231
replay	Chipstead (8)	0–2	Needham Market (8)	139
52	Romford (8)	0–4	Hampton & Richmond Borough (6)	193
53	Canvey Island (7)	1–0	Whitstable Town (8)	271
54	Redbridge (8)	1–2	Harrow Borough (7)	82
55	Burnham (8)	2–6	Whitehawk (8)	103
56	Bedford Town (7)	0–2	Boreham Wood (6)	361
57	Thurrock (6)	3–1	Stamford (8)	122
58	Cray Wanderers (7)	2–2	Ebbsfleet United (6)	408
replay	Ebbsfleet United (6)	4–2	Cray Wanderers (7)	535
59	St. Albans City (6)	3–1	Beckenham Town (9)	323
60	Metropolitan Police (8)	2–1	Burgess Hill Town (8)	102
61	Margate (7)	1–1	Kingstonian (7)	438
replay	Kingstonian (7)	1–1 (3–2 p)	Margate (7)	350
62	Dartford (6)	2–1	Lowestoft Town (7)	1,024
63	Chelmsford City (6)	7–0	Chertsey Town (9)	623
64	Hamble ASSC (9)	2–1	Old Woodstock Town (9)	
65	Eastleigh (6)	2–0	Bognor Regis Town (8)	477
66	Sholing (8)	2–2	Salisbury City (7)	360
replay	Salisbury City (7)	5–1	Sholing (8)	604
67	Chippenham Town (7)	0–1	Farnborough (6)	486
68	Havant & Waterlooville (6)	1–0	Frome Town (8)	448
69	Mangotsfield United (8)	1–4	Dorchester Town (6)	100
70	Paulton Rovers (8)	0–1	Didcot Town (7)	279
71	Bristol Manor Farm (9)	2–2	Basingstoke Town (6)	183
replay	Basingstoke Town (6)	1–0	Bristol Manor Farm (9)	223
72	Sherborne Town (9)	1–2	Hungerford Town (8)	138
73	Bashley (7)	2–2	Fleet Town (8)	195
replay	Fleet Town (8)	0–2	Bashley (7)	146
74	Poole Town (9)	1–1	Thame United (9)	315
replay	Thame United (9)	0–1 (a.e.t.)	Poole Town (9)	126
75	Guildford City (9)	1–2	Clevedon Town (8)	150
76	Bishop's Cleeve (8)	1–2	Woking (6)	252
77	Gloucester City (6)	0–2	Weston-super-Mare (6)	380
78	Swindon Supermarine (7)	3–0	Weymouth (7)	185
79	Maidenhead United (6)	1–0	Truro City (7)	237
80	Alton Town (9)	2–2	Cinderford Town (8)	213
replay	Cinderford Town (8)	2–1 (a.e.t.)	Alton Town (9)	129

== Third round qualifying ==
The third round qualifying took place on the weekend of 9 October 2010. A total of 80 clubs took part, all having progressed from the second round qualifying. Radcliffe Olympic from Level 10 of English football was the lowest-ranked club to qualify for this round of the competition.

Tie	Home team (tier)	Score	Away team (tier)	Att.
1	FC Halifax Town (7)	4–0	Harrogate Town (6)	1,835
2	Sheffield (8)	1–1	Frickley Athletic (7)	632
replay	Frickley Athletic (7)	1–2	Sheffield (8)	322
3	Guiseley (6)	3–0	Whitley Bay (9)	704
4	Norton & Stockton Ancients (9)	2–5	F.C. United of Manchester (7)	1,526
5	Workington (6)	2–1	Shildon (9)	513
6	North Ferriby United (7)	2–2	Vauxhall Motors (6)	369
replay	Vauxhall Motors (6)	1–1 (4–3 p)	North Ferriby United (7)	202
7	Warrington Town (8)	1–3	Stalybridge Celtic (6)	429
8	Lincoln Moorlands Railway (9)	1–1	Mossley (8)	216
replay	Mossley (8)	4–1	Lincoln Moorlands Railway (9)	180
9	Ashington (9)	1–4	Droylsden (6)	543
10	Solihull Moors (6)	1–1	Barwell (8)	387
replay	Barwell (8)	3–1	Solihull Moors (6)	343
11	Mickleover Sports (7)	1–2	Newcastle Town (8)	562
12	Buxton (7)	1–1	AFC Telford United (6)	836
replay	AFC Telford United (6)	2–2 (4–5 p)	Buxton (7)	1,122
13	Redditch United (6)	1–0	Hinckley United (6)	563
14	Corby Town (6)	2–1	Worcester City (6)	520
15	Matlock Town (7)	0–3	Eastwood Town (6)	655
16	Nuneaton Town (6)	6–0	Coleshill Town (9)	965
17	Radcliffe Olympic (10)	3–3	Tipton Town (9)	516
replay	Tipton Town (9)	2–0	Radcliffe Olympic (10)	495
18	Chelmsford City (6)	2–2	Bromley (6)	1,011
replay	Bromley (6)	0–3	Chelmsford City (6)	619
19	Leiston (9)	5–0	North Greenford United (8)	315

Tie	Home team (tier)	Score	Away team (tier)	Att.
20	Brentwood Town (8)	1–1	Woking (6)	748
replay	Woking (6)	1–0	Brentwood Town (8)	460
21	Harrow Borough (7)	2–1	Hampton & Richmond Borough (6)	342
22	St Albans City (6)	0–0	Kingstonian (7)	484
replay	Kingstonian (7)	1–2	St Albans City (6)	367
23	Metropolitan Police (8)	1–1	Wealdstone (7)	390
replay	Wealdstone (7)	1–2 (a.e.t.)	Metropolitan Police (8)	303
24	Lewes (6)	2–1	Thurrock (6)	854
25	Needham Market (8)	0–1	Ebbsfleet United (6)	573
26	Whitehawk (8)	1–2	Hendon (7)	178
27	Boreham Wood (6)	3–1	Enfield Town (8)	361
28	Carshalton Athletic (7)	4–1	Braintree Town (6)	490
29	Concord Rangers (7)	0–1	Hythe Town (9)	143
30	Dover Athletic (6)	3–1	Cambridge City (7)	820
31	Bury Town (7)	2–2	Staines Town (6)	918
replay	Staines Town (6)	2–0	Bury Town (7)	274
32	Canvey Island (7)	2–2	Dartford (6)	715
replay	Dartford (6)	3–3 (9–8 p)	Canvey Island (7)	665
33	Swindon Supermarine (7)	4–0	Hungerford Town (8)	365
34	Salisbury City (7)	1–0	Weston-super-Mare (6)	871
35	Didcot Town (7)	0–4	Basingstoke Town (6)	401
36	Havant & Waterlooville (6)	4–1	Dorchester Town (6)	708
37	Farnborough (6)	2–0	Hamble ASSC (9)	503
38	Poole Town (9)	1–0	Bashley (7)	838
39	Clevedon Town (8)	0–5	Eastleigh (6)	313
40	Cinderford Town (8)	0–4	Maidenhead United (6)	218

== Fourth round qualifying ==
The fourth round qualifying took place on the weekend of 23 October 2010. A total of 64 clubs took part, 40 having progressed from the third round qualifying and 24 clubs from Conference Premier, forming Level 5 of English football, entering at this stage. Tipton Town, Poole Town, Hythe Town and Leiston from Level 9 of English football were the lowest-ranked clubs to qualify for this round of the competition.

Tie	Home team (tier)	Score	Away team (tier)	Att.
1	Mossley (8)	2–6	Darlington (5)	619
2	Sheffield (8)	2–2	Tipton Town (9)	1,026
replay	Tipton Town (9)	2–0	Sheffield (8)	1,429
3	Guiseley (6)	2–1	Redditch United (6)	808
4	Fleetwood Town (5)	2–1	Buxton (7)	1,181
5	Altrincham (5)	0–2	Gateshead (5)	797
6	Vauxhall Motors (6)	1–0	Newcastle Town (8)	323
7	F.C. United of Manchester (7)	1–0	Barrow (5)	3,229
8	Workington (6)	1–1	Nuneaton Town (6)	520
replay	Nuneaton Town (6)	1–0	Workington (6)	943
9	Tamworth (5)	1–1	Grimsby Town (5)	928
replay	Grimsby Town (5)	0–1	Tamworth (5)	1,612
10	Kidderminster Harriers (5)	0–2	York City (5)	1,123
11	FC Halifax Town (7)	0–1	Mansfield Town (5)	2,986
12	Wrexham (5)	1–2	Southport (5)	2,052
13	Stalybridge Celtic (6)	1–2	Eastwood Town (6)	659
14	Droylsden (6)	3–0	Barwell (8)	411
15	Woking (6)	3–2	Eastleigh (6)	1,048
16	Hythe Town (9)	2–0	Staines Town (6)	808
17	Eastbourne Borough (5)	2–4	Harrow Borough (7)	681

Tie	Home team (tier)	Score	Away team (tier)	Att.
18	Cambridge United (5)	3–0	Lewes (6)	1,626
19	Corby Town (6)	3–0	Salisbury City (7)	957
20	Newport County (5)	0–1	Crawley Town (5)	2,247
21	Luton Town (5)	4–0	St Albans City (6)	4,144
22	Farnborough (6)	1–1	Dover Athletic (6)	845
replay	Dover Athletic (6)	5–0	Farnborough (6)	1,044
23	Kettering Town (5)	1–2	Rushden & Diamonds (5)	2,792
24	Carshalton Athletic (7)	1–1	Chelmsford City (6)	1,024
replay	Chelmsford City (6)	3–2	Carshalton Athletic (7)	1,069
25	Hendon (7)	0–0	Metropolitan Police (8)	269
replay	Metropolitan Police (8)	0–2	Hendon (7)	302
26	Leiston (9)	0–0	Dartford (6)	832
replay	Dartford (6)	3–2	Leiston (9)	1,074
27	Basingstoke Town (6)	0–1	AFC Wimbledon (5)	1,726
28	Swindon Supermarine (7)	0–0	Bath City (5)	551
replay	Bath City (5)	3–4	Swindon Supermarine (7)	665
29	Havant & Waterlooville (6)	2–0	Histon (5)	905
30	Forest Green Rovers (5)	1–0	Maidenhead United (6)	580
31	Poole Town (9)	1–3	Hayes & Yeading United (5)	1,217
32	Ebbsfleet United (6)	3–0	Boreham Wood (6)	1,005

== Competition proper ==
Winners from the Fourth Round Qualifying advanced to the first round proper, where clubs from Level 3 and Level 4 of English football, operating in The Football League, first enter the competition. See 2010–11 FA Cup for a report of first round proper onwards.
