= 2008–09 Midland Football Combination =

The 2008–09 Midland Football Combination season was the 72nd in the history of Midland Football Combination, a football competition in England.

== Premier Division ==
Midland Football Combination Premier Division
- Season: 2008–09
- Champions: Loughborough University
- Promoted: Loughborough University
- Relegated: Coton Green
- Matches: 420
- Goals: 1,403 (3.34 per match)

The Premier Division featured 18 clubs which competed in the division last season, along with three new clubs, promoted from Division One:

- Coton Green
- Knowle
- Oldbury Athletic

Also, Barnt Green Spartak changed name to GSA.

=== League table ===
| Pos | Team | Pld | W | D | L | GF | GA | GD | Pts | Promotion or relegation |
|---|---|---|---|---|---|---|---|---|---|---|
| 1 | Loughborough University | 40 | 31 | 3 | 6 | 96 | 34 | +62 | 96 | Promoted to the Midland Football Alliance |
| 2 | Castle Vale | 40 | 27 | 8 | 5 | 84 | 42 | +42 | 89 | |
| 3 | Southam United | 40 | 24 | 10 | 6 | 83 | 36 | +47 | 82 | |
| 4 | Oldbury Athletic | 40 | 26 | 4 | 10 | 101 | 55 | +46 | 82 | Transferred to the West Midlands (Regional) League |
| 5 | Heather St John's | 40 | 18 | 12 | 10 | 68 | 45 | +23 | 66 | |
| 6 | Nuneaton Griff | 40 | 18 | 10 | 12 | 64 | 51 | +13 | 64 | |
| 7 | Walsall Wood | 40 | 18 | 9 | 13 | 59 | 50 | +9 | 63 | |
| 8 | Pilkington XXX | 40 | 17 | 6 | 17 | 79 | 83 | −4 | 57 | |
| 9 | Coventry Copsewood | 40 | 16 | 8 | 16 | 75 | 66 | +9 | 56 | |
| 10 | Heath Hayes | 40 | 17 | 5 | 18 | 56 | 79 | −23 | 56 | |
| 11 | Cadbury Athletic | 40 | 16 | 7 | 17 | 62 | 57 | +5 | 55 | |
| 12 | Knowle | 40 | 13 | 11 | 16 | 50 | 64 | −14 | 50 | |
| 13 | Pershore Town | 40 | 13 | 10 | 17 | 59 | 81 | −22 | 46 (Note: Pershore Town deducted 3 points.) | |
| 14 | GSA | 40 | 13 | 6 | 21 | 64 | 84 | −20 | 45 | |
| 15 | Massey Ferguson | 40 | 11 | 11 | 18 | 61 | 72 | −11 | 44 | |
| 16 | Brocton | 40 | 11 | 8 | 21 | 60 | 71 | −11 | 41 | |
| 17 | Continental Star | 40 | 11 | 7 | 22 | 70 | 84 | −14 | 40 | |
| 18 | Bartley Green | 40 | 11 | 8 | 21 | 58 | 81 | −23 | 38 (Note: Bartley Green deducted 3 points.) | |
| 19 | Bolehall Swifts | 40 | 10 | 7 | 23 | 43 | 71 | −28 | 37 | |
| 20 | Meir KA | 40 | 9 | 8 | 23 | 52 | 87 | −35 | 35 | |
| 21 | Coton Green | 40 | 5 | 12 | 23 | 59 | 110 | −51 | 27 | Relegated to Division One |

Source: fchd
Rules for classification: 1) points; 2) goal difference; 3) number of goals scored.
