= 2011–12 Midland Football Combination =

The 2011–12 Midland Football Combination season was the 75th in the history of Midland Football Combination, a football competition in England.

== Premier Division ==
Midland Football Combination Premier Division
- Season: 2011–12
- Champions: Continental Star
- Promoted: Continental Star
- Matches: 272
- Goals: 939 (3.45 per match)

The Premier Division featured 15 clubs which competed in the division last season, along with two new clubs:

- Bloxwich United, transferred from the West Midlands (Regional) League
- Earlswood Town, promoted from the Division One

=== League table ===
Pos	Team	Pld	W	D	L	GF	GA	GD	Pts	Promotion or relegation
1	Continental Star	32	21	7	4	72	39	+33	70	Promoted to the Midland Football Alliance
2	Southam United	32	21	3	8	87	48	+39	66	
3	Coventry Copsewood	32	18	6	8	58	30	+28	60	
4	Bolehall Swifts	32	17	7	8	73	44	+29	58	
5	Castle Vale	32	17	6	9	56	34	+22	57	Club folded
6	Brocton	32	17	4	11	67	45	+22	55	
7	Bloxwich United	32	16	6	10	68	62	+6	54	
8	Earlswood Town	32	12	6	14	52	54	−2	42	
9	Bartley Green	32	11	6	15	39	53	−14	39	Transferred to the West Midlands (Regional) League
10	Pilkington XXX	32	11	5	16	41	68	−27	38	
11	Nuneaton Griff	32	9	10	13	56	64	−8	37	
12	Cadbury Athletic	32	9	8	15	46	56	−10	35	Demoted to Division One
13	Racing Club Warwick	32	10	5	17	46	57	−11	35	
14	Walsall Wood	32	9	6	17	45	50	−5	33	
15	Pelsall Villa	32	9	5	18	33	58	−25	32	
16	Pershore Town	32	8	7	17	43	72	−29	31	
17	Castle Vale JKS	32	6	5	21	57	105	−48	23	

Source: fchd
Rules for classification: 1) points; 2) goal difference; 3) number of goals scored.
