= 2010–11 Midland Football Combination =

The 2010–11 Midland Football Combination season was the 74th in the history of Midland Football Combination, a football competition in England.

== Premier Division ==
Midland Football Combination Premier Division
- Season: 2010–11
- Champions: Heather St John's
- Promoted: Heather St John's
- Matches: 342
- Goals: 1,149 (3.36 per match)

The Premier Division featured 18 clubs which competed in the division last season, along with one new club, promoted from Division One:

- Alveston

=== League table ===
Pos	Team	Pld	W	D	L	GF	GA	GD	Pts	Promotion or relegation
1	Heather St John's	36	25	6	5	112	34	+78	81	Promoted to the Midland Football Alliance
2	Nuneaton Griff	36	22	7	7	93	50	+43	70 (Note: Nuneaton Griff deducted 3 points.)	
3	Castle Vale	36	19	10	7	67	38	+29	67	
4	Coventry Copsewood	36	21	4	11	75	49	+26	67	
5	Dosthill Colts	36	19	6	11	63	52	+11	63	Merged into Coleshill Town
6	Cadbury Athletic	36	17	9	10	61	40	+21	60	
7	Bolehall Swifts	36	18	5	13	56	43	+13	59	
8	Brocton	36	18	4	14	80	53	+27	58	
9	Walsall Wood	36	16	10	10	42	33	+9	58	
10	Southam United	36	14	10	12	43	33	+10	52	
11	Continental Star	36	14	8	14	58	52	+6	50	
12	Bartley Green	36	12	10	14	66	76	−10	46	
13	Pershore Town	36	10	9	17	47	64	−17	39	
14	Castle Vale JKS	36	11	5	20	62	86	−24	38	
15	Pilkington XXX	36	7	12	17	53	80	−27	33	
16	Massey Ferguson	36	8	9	19	51	93	−42	33	Resigned from the league
17	Pelsall Villa	36	10	1	25	34	80	−46	31	
18	Alveston	36	8	3	25	41	110	−69	27	Resigned from the league
19	Racing Club Warwick	36	4	10	22	45	83	−38	21 (Note: Racing Club Warwick deducted 1 point.)	

Source: fchd
Rules for classification: 1) points; 2) goal difference; 3) number of goals scored.
