= 2009–10 Midland Football Combination =

The 2009–10 Midland Football Combination season was the 73rd in the history of the Midland Football Combination, a football competition in England.

== Premier Division ==
Midland Football Combination Premier Division
- Season: 2009–10
- Champions: Heath Hayes
- Promoted: Heath Hayes
- Matches: 462
- Goals: 1,746 (3.78 per match)

The Premier Division featured 18 clubs which competed in the division last season, along with four new clubs:

- Castle Vale JKS, promoted from Division One
- Dosthill Colts, promoted from Division One
- Pelsall Villa, transferred from the West Midlands (Regional) League
- Racing Club Warwick, relegated from the Midland Football Alliance

=== League table ===
Pos	Team	Pld	W	D	L	GF	GA	GD	Pts	Promotion or relegation
1	Heath Hayes	42	29	4	9	128	60	+68	91	Promoted to the Midland Football Alliance
2	Heather St John's	42	26	10	6	119	42	+77	88	
3	Pilkington XXX	42	26	5	11	95	73	+22	80 (Note: Pilkington XXX deducted 3 points.)	
4	Castle Vale	42	23	10	9	98	55	+43	79	
5	Coventry Copsewood	42	22	11	9	81	55	+26	77	
6	Walsall Wood	42	21	8	13	79	76	+3	71	
7	Brocton	42	20	6	16	94	65	+29	66	
8	Dosthill Colts	42	17	13	12	77	62	+15	64	
9	GSA	42	18	9	15	97	80	+17	63	Resigned from the league
10	Bartley Green	42	19	5	18	99	63	+36	62	
11	Knowle	42	18	6	18	59	57	+2	60	Demoted to Division One
12	Nuneaton Griff	42	15	12	15	74	64	+10	57	
13	Massey Ferguson	42	16	8	18	72	88	−16	56	
14	Continental Star	42	15	9	18	81	84	−3	54	
15	Southam United	42	13	14	15	77	82	−5	53	
16	Castle Vale JKS	42	13	10	19	83	82	+1	49	
17	Pelsall Villa	42	14	7	21	70	97	−27	49	
18	Bolehall Swifts	42	12	8	22	65	91	−26	44	
19	Cadbury Athletic	42	10	11	21	63	109	−46	41	
20	Pershore Town	42	9	8	25	45	98	−53	35	
21	Meir KA	42	9	5	28	46	105	−59	32	Resigned from the league
22	Racing Club Warwick	42	7	1	34	44	158	−114	22	

Source: fchd
Rules for classification: 1) points; 2) goal difference; 3) number of goals scored.
