= 2012–13 Midland Football Alliance =

Midland Football Alliance
- Season: 2012–13
- Champions: Stratford Town
- Promoted: Stratford Town
- Relegated: Ellesmere Rangers; Studley
- Matches: 462
- Goals: 1,538 (3.33 per match)

The 2012–13 Midland Football Alliance season was the 19th season of the Midland Football Alliance, a football league in England.

== Clubs ==
The league featured 19 clubs from the previous season, along with three new clubs:

- Continental Star, promoted from the Midland Football Combination
- Gornal Athletic, promoted from the West Midlands (Regional) League
- Stourport Swifts, relegated from the Southern Football League
- From this league, only Boldmere St Michaels, Bridgnorth Town, Causeway United, Loughborough University, Stourport Swifts, Stratford Town and Westfields have applied for promotion.

== League table ==
Pos	Team	Pld	W	D	L	GF	GA	GD	Pts	Promotion or relegation
1	Stratford Town	42	28	7	7	106	46	+60	91	Promoted to the Southern Football League
2	Westfields	42	28	6	8	103	52	+51	90	
3	Gornal Athletic	42	25	11	6	86	58	+28	86	
4	Loughborough University	42	23	6	13	89	39	+50	75	
5	Stourport Swifts	42	21	10	11	89	47	+42	73	
6	Tipton Town	42	21	9	12	91	65	+26	72	
7	Bridgnorth Town	42	19	10	13	62	54	+8	67	Club folded
8	Tividale	42	20	6	16	81	69	+12	66	
9	Boldmere St. Michaels	42	19	6	17	77	74	+3	63	
10	Dunkirk	42	18	8	16	69	69	0	62	
11	Alvechurch	42	18	8	16	70	75	−5	62	
12	Kirby Muxloe	42	15	8	19	60	74	−14	53	
13	Rocester	42	13	13	16	66	66	0	52	
14	Coventry Sphinx	42	15	5	22	47	68	−21	50	
15	Coleshill Town	42	13	8	21	52	69	−17	47	
16	Continental Star	42	13	7	22	57	78	−21	46	
17	Causeway United	42	11	11	20	52	67	−15	44	
18	Heath Hayes	42	12	7	23	64	111	−47	43	
19	Highgate United	42	11	9	22	65	100	−35	42	
20	Heather St. John's	42	11	7	24	49	83	−34	40	
21	Studley	42	9	11	22	51	84	−33	38	Relegated to the Midland Football Combination
22	Ellesmere Rangers	42	8	9	25	52	90	−38	33	Relegated to the West Midlands (Regional) League

Source: fchd
Rules for classification: 1) points; 2) goal difference; 3) number of goals scored.

== Results ==
Home \ Away	ALV	BOS	BRI	CAU	COL	COS	COV	DUN	ELL	GOR	HEA	HEJ	HIG	KIM	LOU	ROC	SPS	STR	STU	TIP	TIV	WES
Alvechurch		3–2	1–0	0–3	4–1	2–2	1–0	1–2	4–2	0–1	1–0	0–0	1–2	1–4	1–4	0–1	1–1	1–3	3–2	2–4	2–2	2–1
Boldmere St. Michaels	2–1		3–0	1–1	0–2	1–2	0–0	3–2	2–1	1–4	1–2	0–1	3–2	1–0	0–1	1–0	1–3	3–5	4–0	1–2	3–4	0–4
Bridgnorth Town	2–2	2–2		1–0	0–0	2–1	2–1	2–1	1–1	1–1	3–1	4–1	5–1	1–2	1–0	2–2	2–0	1–2	2–0	1–3	1–3	0–1
Causeway United	1–1	5–2	0–1		2–1	3–2	2–0	0–1	1–2	0–0	3–0	1–1	1–0	2–2	0–3	3–3	1–1	1–2	1–1	1–3	1–2	0–0
Coleshill Town	0–3	0–2	1–3	0–0		1–2	0–2	2–3	2–0	0–1	2–1	1–0	1–2	2–1	3–0	1–1	1–4	0–1	2–2	2–2	1–5	0–1
Continental Star	0–1	1–2	0–2	1–3	1–0		1–1	1–1	2–0	1–2	1–2	2–2	3–1	4–1	1–0	2–2	3–0	3–1	4–1	0–2	0–1	1–1
Coventry Sphinx	0–1	0–4	1–0	1–0	1–4	3–2		0–2	2–1	3–1	1–2	1–1	1–2	1–0	0–3	1–3	0–5	2–1	1–0	4–2	1–2	1–2
Dunkirk	3–2	1–1	1–2	3–1	2–1	2–1	2–0		0–0	1–4	2–2	6–1	4–1	4–1	0–2	2–1	1–6	1–2	1–3	1–2	3–1	1–2
Ellesmere Rangers	3–4	0–0	0–0	1–2	1–1	1–2	0–0	0–1		2–4	2–0	2–3	1–2	2–1	1–3	1–3	1–3	0–7	1–0	4–2	2–2	1–4
Gornal Athletic	4–1	3–3	1–1	2–0	0–1	3–0	3–1	4–2	3–2		2–2	1–1	2–2	0–3	1–2	3–2	2–0	2–1	1–1	1–1	2–1	5–2
Heath Hayes	2–6	1–2	3–2	3–2	4–0	0–4	0–2	3–0	3–2	0–2		1–0	1–8	1–1	1–4	2–1	1–3	2–2	2–1	2–4	4–3	1–1
Heather St. John's	2–3	1–5	1–3	2–1	0–4	0–1	1–0	0–3	0–2	2–4	5–1		2–0	0–0	3–1	0–1	2–4	0–1	1–2	0–2	3–1	3–3
Highgate United	3–3	3–4	3–0	2–1	2–1	1–0	0–4	3–2	2–2	1–1	4–4	1–3		1–4	0–0	0–2	0–2	1–2	2–0	1–1	2–3	0–3
Kirby Muxloe	1–2	2–0	0–2	3–1	1–2	1–0	0–2	1–1	1–1	1–3	4–1	2–1	2–2		2–1	1–2	2–1	0–3	2–1	0–0	0–3	0–5
Loughborough University	0–1	7–0	0–1	1–0	0–0	3–1	3–1	1–1	3–0	7–0	6–0	1–2	4–0	1–2		5–1	4–0	0–2	3–1	3–1	0–1	4–2
Rocester	0–1	1–2	2–2	4–2	0–2	4–0	2–0	0–1	2–3	5–1	3–2	2–0	2–0	2–3	0–3		1–1	1–1	2–3	0–2	1–1	1–2
Stourport Swifts	1–2	1–4	1–1	1–1	5–1	3–1	1–1	2–2	3–0	0–1	4–0	1–0	7–0	3–0	1–1	4–0		2–1	2–2	1–0	4–0	3–1
Stratford Town	2–1	1–0	3–1	7–0	2–1	9–0	4–0	2–2	4–1	0–2	1–1	2–1	4–2	2–1	2–3	1–1	1–1		4–0	3–0	3–1	0–2
Studley	1–1	0–2	0–2	3–1	1–5	2–2	1–0	0–1	2–1	0–2	4–0	0–1	2–2	3–3	1–1	1–1	2–1	0–3		5–2	0–0	1–2
Tipton Town	4–2	2–3	1–2	1–2	5–0	4–0	1–3	2–0	4–0	3–3	4–3	4–0	5–3	2–1	0–0	2–2	1–0	3–3	4–1		1–0	2–2
Tividale	1–0	0–4	2–1	2–0	1–1	5–1	1–3	2–0	2–3	1–2	5–3	4–2	5–0	0–2	2–0	0–0	0–3	1–4	7–0	1–0		3–4
Westfields	6–1	3–2	5–0	0–2	1–2	2–1	5–1	4–0	3–2	0–2	3–0	5–0	2–1	7–2	2–1	2–2	1–0	1–2	2–1	2–1	2–0	

Legend: Blue = home team win; Yellow = draw; Red = away team win.
