= 2011–12 Midland Football Alliance =

Midland Football Alliance
- Season: 2011–12
- Champions: Gresley
- Promoted: Gresley
- Relegated: Atherstone Town; Willenhall Town
- Matches: 462
- Goals: 1,515 (3.28 per match)

The 2011–12 Midland Football Alliance season was the 18th in the history of Midland Football Alliance, a football competition in England.

== Clubs and League table ==
The league featured 18 clubs from the previous season, along with four new clubs:

- Atherstone Town, resigned from the Southern Football League
- Gresley, promoted from the East Midlands Counties League
- Heather St John's, promoted from the Midland Football Combination
- Tividale, promoted from the West Midlands (Regional) League

=== Stadia and locations ===
Locations of the 2011–12 Midland Football Alliance clubs

Club	Location	Stadium	Capacity
Alvechurch	Alvechurch	Lye Meadow	3,000
Atherstone Town	Atherstone	Sheepy Road	
Boldmere St. Michaels	Boldmere	Trevor Brown Memorial Ground	2,500
Bridgnorth Town	Bridgnorth	Crown Meadow	
Causeway United	Amblecote	War Memorial Athletic Ground	2,626
Coleshill Town	Coleshill	Pack Meadow	
Coventry Sphinx	Coventry	Sphinx Drive	1,000
Dunkirk	Nottingham (Dunkirk)	Ron Steel Sports Ground	1,500
Ellesmere Rangers	Ellesmere	Beech Grove	
Gresley	Church Gresley	Moat Ground	2,400
Heather St John's	Heather	St John's Park	
Heath Hayes	Heath Hayes	Coppice Colliery Ground	
Highgate United	Shirley	The Coppice	
Kirby Muxloe	Kirby Muxloe	Ratby Lane	
Loughborough University	Loughborough	Nanpantan Sports Ground	1,500
Rocester	Rocester	Hillsfield	1,500
Stratford Town	Tiddington	Knights Lane	2,800
Studley	Studley	The Beehive	
Tipton Town	Tipton	Tipton Sports Academy	1,000
Tividale	Tividale	The Beeches	2,800
Westfields	Hereford	allpay.park	2,000
Willenhall Town	Willenhall	Noose Lane	

=== League Table ===
Pos	Team	Pld	W	D	L	GF	GA	GD	Pts	Promotion or relegation
1	Gresley	42	27	8	7	96	56	+40	89	Promoted to the Northern Premier League Division One South
2	Westfields	42	27	6	9	93	49	+44	87	
3	Coventry Sphinx	42	26	7	9	74	44	+30	85	
4	Tividale	42	21	9	12	81	56	+25	72	
5	Loughborough University	42	20	9	13	94	56	+38	69	
6	Rocester	42	20	7	15	77	58	+19	67	
7	Causeway United	42	17	15	10	74	56	+18	66	
8	Stratford Town	42	19	8	15	79	55	+24	64 (Note: Stratford Town deducted 1 point.)	
9	Tipton Town	42	18	10	14	73	63	+10	64	
10	Bridgnorth Town	42	17	11	14	59	56	+3	62	
11	Kirby Muxloe	42	16	12	14	75	68	+7	60	
12	Boldmere St. Michaels	42	14	12	16	58	61	−3	54	
13	Alvechurch	42	14	9	19	58	67	−9	51	
14	Heath Hayes	42	14	9	19	76	90	−14	51	
15	Ellesmere Rangers	42	13	11	18	49	65	−16	50	
16	Coleshill Town	42	14	8	20	55	73	−18	50	
17	Studley	42	16	6	20	78	82	−4	48 (Note: Studley deducted 6 points.)	
18	Dunkirk	42	14	6	22	59	87	−28	48	
19	Heather St. John's	42	13	8	21	56	73	−17	47	
20	Highgate United	42	12	8	22	60	77	−17	44	
21	Atherstone Town	42	11	9	22	48	78	−30	42	Relegated to the Midland Football Combination
22	Willenhall Town	42	3	4	35	43	145	−102	13	Relegated to the West Midlands (Regional) League

Source: fchd
Rules for classification: 1) points; 2) goal difference; 3) number of goals scored.
