= 2013–14 Midland Football Alliance =

Midland Football Alliance
- Season: 2013–14
- Champions: Tividale
- Promoted: Tividale
- Relegated: Heather St. John's; Gornal Athletic
- Matches: 462
- Goals: 1,629 (3.53 per match)

The 2013–14 Midland Football Alliance season was the 20th and final in the history of Midland Football Alliance, a football competition in England.

At the end of the season the Midland Alliance and the Midland Combination merged to form the Midland Football League. The Midland Alliance clubs formed Premier Division, while the Midland Combination clubs formed Division One.

== Clubs ==
The league featured 18 clubs from the previous season, along with four new clubs:

- AFC Wulfrunians, promoted from the West Midlands (Regional) League
- Quorn, transferred from the United Counties League
- Shepshed Dynamo, transferred from the United Counties League
- Walsall Wood, promoted from the Midland Combination

Eight clubs that have applied for promotion to Step 4 this season are:

- Boldmere St. Michaels
- Causeway United
- Coleshill Town
- Highgate United
- Quorn
- Stourport Swifts
- Tividale
- Westfields

== League table ==
Pos	Team	Pld	W	D	L	GF	GA	GD	Pts	Promotion or relegation
1	Tividale	42	28	11	3	86	34	+52	95	Promoted to the Northern Premier League Division One South
2	Boldmere St. Michaels	42	25	8	9	94	55	+39	83	
3	Highgate United	42	23	10	9	96	60	+36	79	Demoted to Midland Football League Division One
4	Coleshill Town	42	23	9	10	94	47	+47	78	
5	Quorn	42	23	8	11	91	48	+43	77	
6	Walsall Wood	42	20	11	11	70	43	+27	71	
7	Coventry Sphinx	42	19	10	13	77	73	+4	67	
8	AFC Wulfrunians	42	18	11	13	89	76	+13	65	
9	Causeway United	42	19	7	16	88	75	+13	64	
10	Stourport Swifts	42	18	9	15	72	61	+11	63	
11	Tipton Town	42	17	12	13	80	70	+10	63	
12	Westfields	42	17	10	15	84	70	+14	61	
13	Alvechurch	42	17	7	18	68	72	−4	58	
14	Kirby Muxloe	42	16	8	18	64	70	−6	56	
15	Loughborough University	42	14	10	18	82	86	−4	52	
16	Shepshed Dynamo	42	12	9	21	73	82	−9	45	
17	Continental Star	42	12	4	26	59	99	−40	40	
18	Heath Hayes	42	9	11	22	54	92	−38	38	
19	Dunkirk	42	9	9	24	56	99	−43	36	
20	Rocester	42	7	9	26	43	95	−52	30	Reprieved from relegation (Note: Rocester was reprieved from relegation after Highgate United was demoted to Division One of the Midland League.)
21	Heather St. John's	42	7	9	26	56	116	−60	30	Relegated to Midland Football League Division One
22	Gornal Athletic	42	8	10	24	53	106	−53	20 (Note: Gornal Athletic deducted 14 points for fielding ineligible players.)	Relegated to the West Midlands (Regional) League

Source: fchd
Rules for classification: 1) points; 2) goal difference; 3) number of goals scored.

== Results ==
Home \ Away	AWU	ALV	BOS	CAU	COL	COS	COV	DUN	GOR	HEA	HEJ	HIG	KIM	LOU	QON	ROC	SPD	SPS	TIP	TIV	WAW	WES
AFC Wulfrunians		2–1	4–2	0–2	1–2	3–2	1–3	4–1	1–1	3–1	2–1	1–3	5–2	2–1	1–1	5–1	3–0	2–1	1–3	0–3	1–4	1–1
Alvechurch	1–3		2–4	2–3	1–3	5–3	1–2	3–2	1–2	3–1	3–1	3–0	2–0	2–2	1–1	3–2	1–0	2–0	4–4	0–1	0–0	0–0
Boldmere St. Michaels	5–2	2–0		4–1	1–0	3–2	2–1	2–0	6–1	3–0	4–2	2–2	4–0	2–1	3–0	3–0	1–2	0–0	3–2	0–0	3–0	2–1
Causeway United	1–1	2–1	2–2		1–0	2–1	4–2	6–1	4–1	8–1	2–3	1–0	3–1	1–3	1–6	2–1	3–1	0–3	2–1	0–2	2–2	0–4
Coleshill Town	1–5	0–2	3–0	3–0		3–0	1–1	4–0	2–0	2–1	6–1	2–3	4–0	5–0	3–0	0–0	2–0	3–3	3–1	1–1	0–0	1–1
Continental Star	2–4	0–1	2–0	2–0	0–4		0–1	2–0	2–4	4–3	4–0	1–2	1–0	2–4	2–5	3–2	4–1	2–1	1–1	2–3	0–3	1–4
Coventry Sphinx	1–3	3–1	1–1	2–2	0–6	4–1		5–2	3–2	1–1	2–2	1–0	4–2	4–2	0–2	3–0	2–0	1–1	2–0	1–2	1–0	3–1
Dunkirk	2–2	0–2	3–2	1–0	1–1	0–0	0–1		3–2	3–2	3–0	2–3	3–0	3–1	0–7	1–1	3–5	2–2	2–3	1–1	0–4	1–3
Gornal Athletic	1–2	2–0	1–0	0–9	0–4	0–0	3–3	0–0		1–2	1–2	0–4	1–1	3–1	0–0	2–3	1–6	1–3	5–1	2–3	0–1	0–3
Heath Hayes	3–2	2–2	3–1	2–1	1–2	0–2	3–1	1–4	3–2		0–1	3–3	0–1	2–2	1–2	0–0	1–4	1–1	2–1	0–2	1–1	3–1
Heather St. John's	1–1	2–6	1–3	1–2	1–0	1–3	3–3	3–3	4–0	2–2		0–0	1–6	1–1	1–4	2–4	4–2	0–3	2–1	0–4	0–1	1–1
Highgate United	3–3	3–0	2–3	2–2	4–4	6–1	1–3	3–1	4–1	4–0	1–1		2–2	3–0	2–1	5–0	2–1	2–0	2–3	1–1	2–1	2–0
Kirby Muxloe	1–2	2–0	1–2	4–1	3–1	1–0	3–0	2–0	1–1	0–0	2–1	1–2		3–0	0–4	3–0	2–2	3–2	0–2	2–3	0–1	2–1
Loughborough University	2–2	2–2	3–1	2–1	6–4	9–2	3–1	1–2	1–2	1–1	3–1	0–2	0–2		2–4	3–0	2–1	1–1	3–3	1–2	2–2	1–3
Quorn	6–1	4–0	1–1	2–4	2–1	2–0	4–0	3–2	5–0	4–0	2–1	1–0	1–1	1–3		2–0	0–0	3–0	2–1	0–3	0–1	4–0
Rocester	0–7	0–2	0–5	1–5	1–4	4–2	1–2	3–0	3–3	2–1	4–1	2–3	0–1	1–2	1–1		0–0	1–2	0–1	0–0	0–0	1–2
Shepshed Dynamo	1–0	3–2	1–2	2–1	1–4	1–1	1–2	1–1	2–2	0–1	6–2	0–2	4–0	2–2	3–1	2–3		2–2	0–0	1–3	1–0	4–5
Stourport Swifts	2–2	1–2	1–2	2–2	1–2	3–0	2–1	5–0	2–1	3–1	4–0	1–2	0–4	2–1	3–0	3–0	4–1		2–0	2–1	0–2	2–1
Tipton Town	0–0	5–1	2–6	2–2	0–0	1–2	2–0	3–2	2–0	4–2	4–0	2–0	4–1	4–1	2–2	1–1	2–5	1–0		1–1	1–2	3–2
Tividale	2–1	2–0	1–1	1–0	3–0	2–0	2–2	1–0	6–0	3–1	3–1	5–3	1–1	1–0	1–0	2–0	3–2	5–0	0–2		1–1	1–1
Walsall Wood	2–2	1–2	3–0	3–1	0–1	1–0	2–1	1–0	0–1	1–1	6–1	4–4	3–1	1–2	2–0	2–0	3–0	1–2	2–2	1–3		0–2
Westfields	3–1	0–1	1–1	0–2	0–2	5–0	3–3	4–1	3–3	4–0	4–3	0–2	2–2	2–5	0–1	4–0	3–2	3–0	2–2	2–1	2–5	

Legend: Blue = home team win; Yellow = draw; Red = away team win.
