= 2007–08 Midland Football Combination =

The 2007–08 Midland Football Combination season was the 71st in the history of Midland Football Combination, a football competition in England.

== Premier Division ==
Midland Football Combination Premier Division
- Season: 2007–08
- Champions: Coleshill Town
- Promoted: Coleshill Town; Highgate United
- Relegated: Brereton Social
- Matches: 462
- Goals: 1,615 (3.5 per match)

The Premier Division featured 19 clubs which competed in the division last season, along with three new clubs:

- Bartley Green, promoted from Division One
- Heather Athletic, promoted from Division One, who also changed name to Heather St John's
- Loughborough University, new club

=== League table ===
Pos	Team	Pld	W	D	L	GF	GA	GD	Pts	Promotion or relegation
1	Coleshill Town	42	30	5	7	124	47	+77	95	Promoted to the Midland Football Alliance
2	Highgate United	42	29	8	5	95	49	+46	95	Promoted to the Midland Football Alliance
3	Southam United	42	22	9	11	83	63	+20	75	
4	Loughborough University	42	21	10	11	78	55	+23	73	
5	Castle Vale	42	20	11	11	85	62	+23	70 (Note: Castle Vale deducted 1 point.)	
6	Pilkington XXX	42	19	11	12	83	75	+8	68	
7	Heather St John's	42	19	10	13	80	64	+16	67	
8	Pershore Town	42	21	7	14	77	61	+16	67 (Note: Pershore Town deducted 3 points.)	
9	Brocton	42	18	12	12	77	65	+12	66	
10	Heath Hayes	42	18	10	14	99	80	+19	64	
11	Walsall Wood	42	17	11	14	62	53	+9	62	
12	Cadbury Athletic	42	16	11	15	80	72	+8	59	
13	Nuneaton Griff	42	16	11	15	69	66	+3	59	
14	Bartley Green	42	14	6	22	70	83	−13	48	
15	Massey Ferguson	42	14	6	22	65	94	−29	48	
16	Barnt Green Spartak	42	13	7	22	67	75	−8	46	
17	Bolehall Swifts	42	11	11	20	57	77	−20	44	
18	Continental Star	42	11	9	22	79	99	−20	42	
19	Feckenham	42	11	9	22	52	96	−44	42	Demoted to Division Two
20	Meir KA	42	11	9	22	51	73	−22	39 (Note: Meir K A deducted 3 points.)	
21	Coventry Copsewood	42	9	11	22	57	84	−27	38	
22	Brereton Social	42	2	6	34	25	122	−97	12	Relegated to Division One

Source: fchd
Rules for classification: 1) points; 2) goal difference; 3) number of goals scored.
