= Castle Vale Town F.C. =

Association football club in England

Coordinates: 52.516022°N 1.7786935°W

Castle Vale Town
- Full name: Castle Vale Town Football Club
- Founded: 1998
- Ground: Vale Stadium, Castle Vale
- Chairman: Lee Johnson
- Manager: Luke Evans
- League: Midland League Division Three
- 2025–26: Midland League Division Three (withdrew)
- Website: castlevalespitfires.co.uk
Home colours	Away colours

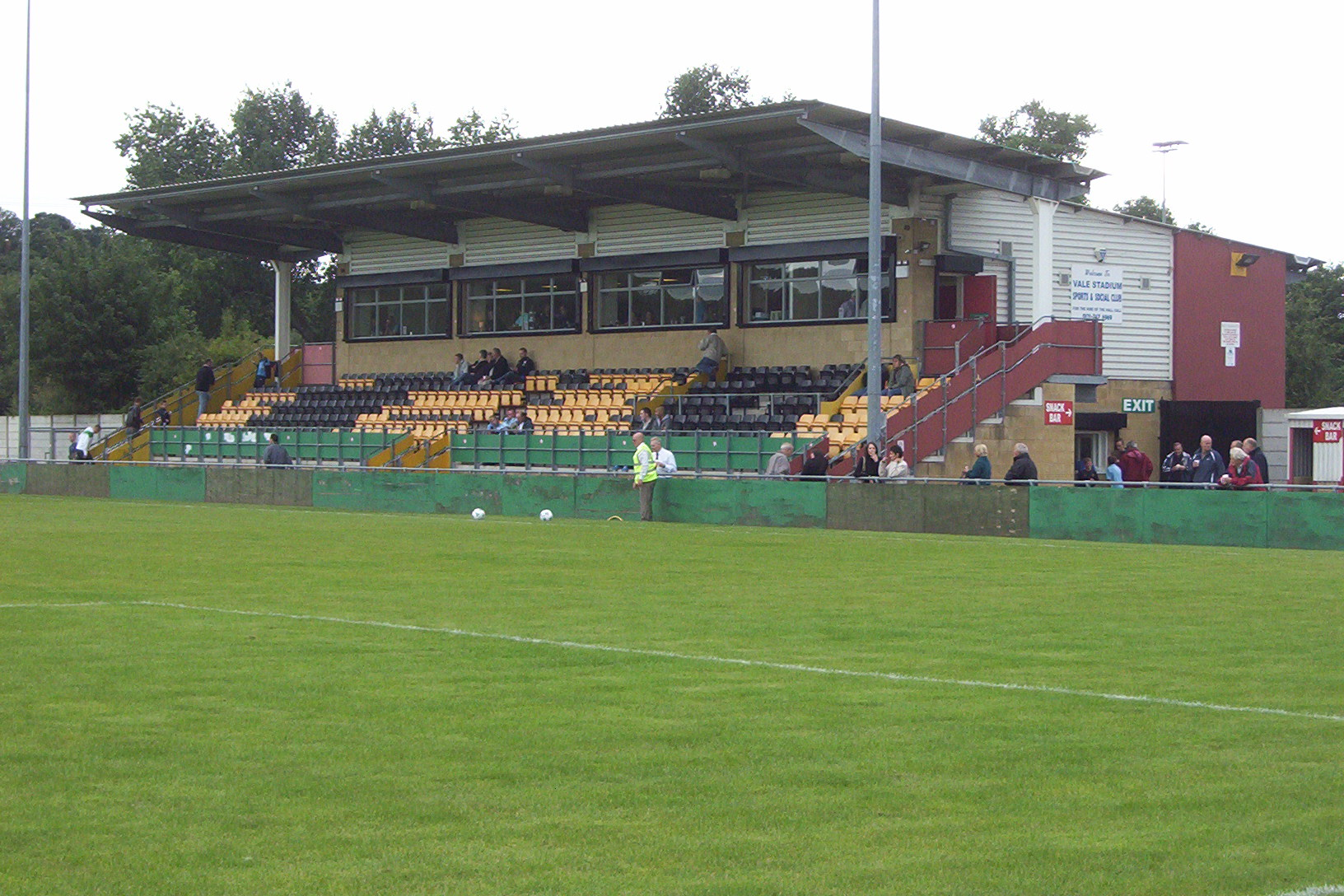
The grandstand at Vale Stadium

Castle Vale Town Football Club is a football club based in the Castle Vale area of Birmingham, England. They are currently members of the Midland League Division Three and play at the Vale Stadium.

== History ==
The club was established in 1998 as the reserve team of Castle Vale Kings Heath. They joined Division Three of the Midland Combination in 2003, and were runners-up in their first season, earning promotion to Division Two. In 2005 the team were renamed Castle Vale Reserves as the club changed its name, and in 2006 they became a separate club under the name Castle Vale JKS, JKS standing for Junior Kick Stars, the youth team that merged with the reserves to form a new club; a new Castle Vale reserve team was subsequently formed and joined Division Three of the Midland Combination in 2007.

The new Castle Vale JKS started in Division Three of the Midland Combination, but won the division at the first attempt. They went on to win Division Two and the league's Challenge Vase the following season. A third successive title and promotion was secured when they won Division One in 2008–09, with the club also winning the league's Challenge Cup, a trophy they won again in 2010–11. Although the club finished bottom of the Premier Division in 2011–12 and 2012–13, they were not relegated to Division One. However, they resigned from the league midway through the 2013–14 season.

The club was reformed as Castle Vale Town and in 2016 they joined the Division Three of the Midland League, formed in 2014 by a merger of the Midland Combination and the Midland Alliance. In their first season they finished bottom of Division Three.

=== Season-by-season record ===
Season	League	Position	Notes
2003–04	Midland Combination Division Three	2/15	Promoted
2004–05	Midland Combination Division Two	9/18	
2005–06	Midland Combination Division Two	11/14	Demoted
2006–07	Midland Combination Division Three	1/14	Promoted
2007–08	Midland Combination Division Two	1/14	Promoted
2008–09	Midland Combination Division One	1/16	Promoted
2009–10	Midland Combination Premier Division	16/22	
2010–11	Midland Combination Premier Division	14/19	
2011–12	Midland Combination Premier Division	17/17	
2012–13	Midland Combination Premier Division	18/18	
2013–14	Midland Combination Premier Division	–	Resigned, record expunged
2016–17	Midland League Division Three	14/14	
2017–18	Midland League Division Three	15/16	
2018–19	Midland League Division Three	14/16	
2019–20	Midland League Division Three	–	Season abandoned

== Coaching staff ==
Position	Incumbent
Manager	(England) Luke Evans
Coach	(England) Owen Reynolds
Coach	(England) Mitch Torrie
Physio	(England) Jamie Hastings

== Honours ==
- Midland Combination
  - Division One champions 2008–09
  - Division Two champions 2007–08
  - Division Three champions 2006–07
  - Challenge Cup winners 2008–09, 2010–11
  - Challenge Vase winners 2007–08

== Records ==
- Best FA Cup performance: Preliminary round, 2010–11
- Best FA Vase performance: Second qualifying round 2009–10, 2012–13
