= Coton Green F.C. =

Association football club in England

Coordinates: 52.610029°N 1.6976599°W

Coton Green
- Full name: Coton Green Football Club
- Nickname: Green Army
- Founded: 1982
- Ground: The Dave Henderson Memorial Ground, Fazeley
- Chairman: Craig Ruff
- Manager: Kyle Perry
- League: United Counties League Premier Division South
- 2025–26: Midland League Premier Division, 10th of 18 (transferred)
- Website: thegreenarmy.co.uk
| Home colours | Away colours |

Coton Green Football Club is a football club based in Tamworth, Staffordshire, England. They are currently members of the United Counties League Premier Division South and play at New Mill Lane in Fazeley.

== History ==
The club was established in June 1982 as an under-13 team, gradually expanding to run several junior teams. In the early 2000s the club entered an adult team into the Tamworth & District Sunday League. In 2004 they switched to Saturday football, joining Division Three of the Midland Combination. The club won Division Three at the first attempt, earning promotion to Division Two. After finishing second in Division Two in 2006–07 they were promoted to Division One. The club were Division One runners-up the following season, securing promotion to the Premier Division. However, the club spent only one season in the Premier Division, finishing bottom of the table and being relegated back to Division One.

Coton Green remained in Division One until 2014 when the Midland Combination merged with the Midland Alliance to form the Midland League, with the club placed in Division Two. In 2021–22 they were Division Two runners-up, earning promotion to Division One. The club finished fifth in Division One in 2024–25, qualifying for the promotion play-offs. After beating Heather St John's 2–0 in the semi-finals, they defeated Leicester St Andrews 5–3 on penalties in the final to earn promotion to the Premier Division.

At the end of the 2025–26 season Coton Green were transferred to the Premier Division South of the United Counties League.

== Ground ==
The club initially played at Whittington Barracks, before moving to Dosthill Park in 1988. In 1993 they moved to New Mill Lane of Fazeley Swifts, later becoming the main tenants of the site after Fazeley Swifts folded due to the changing rooms burning down in 1995. In 2008 the first team moved to Brereton Social's Red Lion Ground in order to meet the Midland Combination Premier Division ground grading requirement to have floodlights. They later returned to New Mill Lane, where floodlights were installed in 2016.

== Staff ==
| Position | Name |
|---|---|
| Chairman | (England) Craig Ruff |
| Vice-Chairman | (England) Onkar Sandhu |
| Secretary | (England) Aaron Cartwright |
| Match Day Secretary | (England) Rob Weale |
| First Team Manager | (England) Kyle Perry |
| Assistant Manager (First) | (England) Todd Perry |
| Physio | (England) Indy Bhasra |
| Ladies Manager | (England) Chad Male |
| Assistant Manager (Ladies) | (England) Aaron Cartwright |
| Groundsman | (England) Neil Cartwright |

== Managerial history ==
| Manager | Period |
|---|---|
| (England) Ken Coles | 2004–2007 |
| (England) Steve Pike | 2007–2011 |
| (England) Jamie Dix | 2011–2013 |
| (England) John Downing | 2013–2015 |
| (England) Rob Masefield | 2015–2020 |
| (England) Adam Wilkes | 2020 |
| (England) Russell Dodds | 2020–2021 |
| (England) Nic Oakley | 2021–2023 |
| (England) Jason Pyott | 2023 |
| (England) Russell Dodds | 2023 |
| (England) Nic Oakley | 2023–2026 |
| (England) Kyle Perry | 2026–present |

== Honours ==
- Midland Combination
  - Division Three champions 2004–05
- Fazeley Charity Cup
  - Winners 2010–11, 2011–12, 2023-24, 2024-25

== Records ==
- Best FA Cup performance: Preliminary round, 2025–26
- Best FA Vase performance: First round, 2025-26, 2026–27

== See also ==
- Coton Green F.C. players
