= Earlswood Town F.C. =

Association football club in England

Coordinates: 52.357272°N 1.8469812°W

Earlswood Town
- Full name: Earlswood Town Football Club
- Nickname: The Earls
- Founded: 1968
- Ground: The Pavilions, Earlswood
- Chairman: Andy Walker
- Manager: Tom Reynolds
- League: Midland League Division Two
- 2025–26: Midland League Division Two, 3rd of 15
- Website: https://earlswoodtownfc.co.uk/
Home colours	Away colours

Earlswood Town Football Club is a football club based in Earlswood, near Solihull, England. They are currently members of the Midland League Division Two and play at The Pavilions on Malt House Lane.

Former Republic of Ireland international Don Givens is a vice-president while ex-England goalkeeper Ben Foster is club patron.

== History ==
The club was originally known as Churchgreen United. They were renamed Earlswood Town in 1968, at which point they were playing in the West Midlands Metropolitan League. The club joined the Mercian League in 1971 and won the league's Queens Hospital Cup in 1972–73. After winning the Aston Villa Shield in 1978–79, the club were Premier Division runners-up the following season and went on to win the Premier Division title in 1981–82. They then moved up to Division Three of the Midland Combination, which was renamed Division Two in 1983.

Earlswood won the Midland Combination's Challenge Vase in 2002–03 and retained the trophy the following season. A fourth-place finish in 2007–08 saw them promoted to Division One. The club were runners-up in Division One in 2009–10, and after moving to Pilkington XXX's Triplex Ground in order to meet the ground grading criteria for the Premier Division, the club won the Division One title the following season, earning promotion to the Premier Division. When the Midland Combination merged with the Midland Alliance to form the Midland League in 2014, Earlswood were placed in Division Two. Despite finishing bottom of Division Two in 2015–16 and 2018-19, the club avoided relegation.

Ahead of the 2023/24 campaign, The Earls launched a fully-fledged junior section for the first time in the club's history with U7 to U10 sides competing in the Central Warwickshire Youth Football League.

== Ground ==
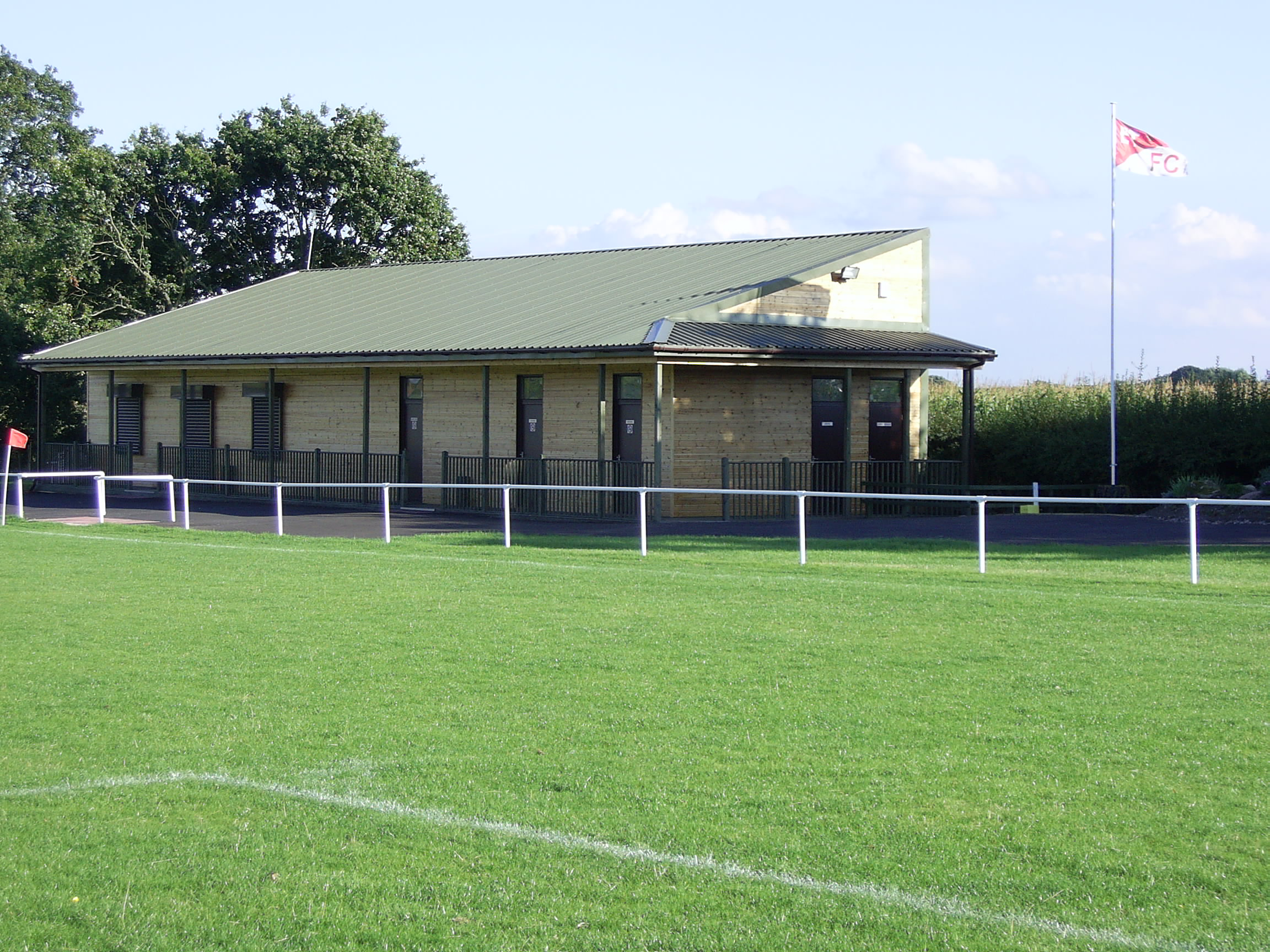
The Pavilions on Malt House Lane

The club moved to Lady Lane in Earlswood in 1966, before relocating to the Pavilions on Malt House Lane in 1970. In 2010, the club moved to Pilkington XXX's Triplex Ground in Kings Norton in order to be meet the ground grading criteria to be promoted to the Midland Combination Premier Division. In 2012, the club relocated to Studley's Beehive ground, and played the 2013/14 season at Bromsgrove Sporting's Victoria Ground before later returning to the Pavilions ground.

For the 2023/24 season only, the club announced a ground naming rights agreement with Yakinori, a Japanese restaurant chain.

== Honours ==
- Midland Combination
  - Division One champions 2010–11
  - Challenge Vase winners 2002–03, 2003–04
- Mercian League
  - Premier Division champions 1981–82
  - Queens Hospital Cup winners 1972–73
  - Aston Villa Shield winners 1978–79

== Records ==
- Best FA Cup performance: Extra-preliminary round, 2012–13, 2013–14
- Best FA Vase performance: First round, 2013–14

== See also ==
- Earlswood Town F.C. players
