= 2005–06 West Midlands (Regional) League =

The 2005–06 West Midlands (Regional) League season was the 106th in the history of the West Midlands (Regional) League, an English association football competition for semi-professional and amateur teams based in the West Midlands county, Shropshire, Herefordshire, Worcestershire and southern Staffordshire. It has three divisions, the highest of which is the Premier Division, which sits at step 6 of the National League System, or the tenth level of the overall English football league system.

== Premier Division ==
West Midlands League Premier Division
- Season: 2005–06
- Champions: Market Drayton Town
- Promoted: Market Drayton Town
- Matches: 462
- Goals: 1,498 (3.24 per match)

The Premier Division featured 18 clubs which competed in the division last season, along with four new clubs:

- Bewdley Town, promoted from Division One
- Great Wyrley, promoted from Division One
- Ludlow Town, relegated from the Midland Football Alliance
- Wyrley Rangers, promoted from Division One

Also, Smethwick Sikh Temple changed name to Smethwick Rangers.

=== League table ===
Pos	Team	Pld	W	D	L	GF	GA	GD	Pts	Promotion or relegation
1	Market Drayton Town	42	32	8	2	102	33	+69	104	Promoted to the Midland Football Alliance
2	Gornal Athletic	42	25	11	6	74	32	+42	86	
3	Great Wyrley	42	24	14	4	94	36	+58	85 (Note: Great Wyrley deducted 1 point)	
4	Bewdley Town	42	23	8	11	101	52	+49	77	
5	Wyrley Rangers	42	22	10	10	81	40	+41	76	
6	Lye Town	42	20	11	11	64	44	+20	71	
7	Goodrich	42	18	16	8	86	66	+20	70	
8	Tividale	42	20	8	14	73	50	+23	68	
9	Wellington	42	19	8	15	64	62	+2	65	
10	Dudley Town	42	18	8	16	74	71	+3	62	
11	Wednesfield	42	18	5	19	56	66	−10	59	
12	Bustleholme	42	15	9	18	66	73	−7	54	
13	Heath Hayes	42	14	12	16	53	64	−11	54	Transferred to the Midland Combination
14	Pelsall Villa	42	16	5	21	61	69	−8	53	
15	Shawbury United	42	15	6	21	74	87	−13	51	
16	Ludlow Town	42	12	11	19	62	90	−28	45 (Note: Ludlow Town deducted 2 points)	
17	Brierley & Hagley	42	11	6	25	50	83	−33	39	
18	Bromyard Town	42	10	8	24	53	79	−26	38	
19	Wolverhampton Casuals	42	11	5	26	60	99	−39	38	
20	Smethwick Rangers	42	11	3	28	57	98	−41	35 (Note: Smethwick Rangers deducted 1 point)	Resigned from the league
21	Kington Town	42	8	7	27	41	103	−62	31	Resigned to the Herefordshire League
22	Ledbury Town	42	7	7	28	52	101	−49	28	

Source: fchd
Rules for classification: 1) points; 2) goal difference; 3) number of goals scored.
