= 2012–13 West Midlands (Regional) League =

The 2012–13 West Midlands (Regional) League season was the 113th in the history of the West Midlands (Regional) League, an English association football competition for semi-professional and amateur teams based in the West Midlands county, Shropshire, Herefordshire, Worcestershire and southern Staffordshire. It has three divisions, the highest of which is the Premier Division, which sits at step 6 of the National League System, or the tenth level of the overall English football league system.

== Premier Division ==
West Midlands League Premier Division
- Season: 2012–13
- Champions: AFC Wulfrunians
- Promoted: AFC Wulfrunians
- Matches: 458
- Goals: 1,865 (4.07 per match)

The Premier Division featured 19 clubs which competed in the division last season, along with three new clubs:

- Bartley Green, transferred from the Midland Football Combination
- Wellington Amateurs, promoted from Division One
- Willenhall Town, relegated from the Midland Football Alliance

=== League table ===
Pos	Team	Pld	W	D	L	GF	GA	GD	Pts	Promotion or relegation
1	AFC Wulfrunians	42	35	1	6	140	42	+98	106	Promoted to the Midland Football Alliance
2	Lye Town	42	33	6	3	124	43	+81	105	
3	Wolverhampton Casuals	42	30	7	5	113	48	+65	97	
4	Shawbury United	42	29	6	7	146	59	+87	93	
5	Black Country Rangers	40	29	1	10	144	61	+83	88	
6	Dudley Town	42	24	7	11	93	58	+35	79	
7	Pegasus Juniors	41	21	8	12	93	65	+28	71	
8	Bewdley Town	42	22	5	15	80	80	0	71	
9	Cradley Town	42	18	6	18	82	77	+5	60	
10	Wolverhampton Sporting Community	42	18	6	18	75	74	+1	60	
11	Sporting Khalsa	42	17	6	19	85	89	−4	57	
12	Wellington Amateurs	42	16	8	18	79	86	−7	56	
13	Malvern Town	42	14	8	20	67	92	−25	50	
14	Bromyard Town	42	15	3	24	76	121	−45	48	
15	Wellington	41	14	5	22	64	93	−29	47	
16	Bartley Green	42	14	5	23	69	107	−38	47	
17	Dudley Sports	41	12	9	20	70	84	−14	45	
18	Wednesfield	41	12	5	24	58	75	−17	41	
19	Shifnal Town	42	11	5	26	66	107	−41	38	
20	Willenhall Town	42	8	6	28	62	118	−56	30	
21	Darlaston Town	40	6	1	33	42	134	−92	19	Club folded
22	Bustleholme	42	2	2	38	37	152	−115	8	

Source: fchd
Rules for classification: 1) points; 2) goal difference; 3) number of goals scored.

=== Results ===
Home \ Away	AWU	BAR	BEW	BLA	BRO	BUS	CRA	DAR	DUD	DUT	LYE	MAL	PEJ	SHA	SHI	SPK	WED	WEH	WEL	WIL	WOC	WSC
AFC Wulfrunians		6–0	6–0	4–3	6–2	3–0	5–3	4–1	6–2	2–0	0–2	5–0	3–0	0–2	7–1	5–0	1–0	4–0	1–1	5–1	2–1	5–0
Bartley Green	0–5		5–2	1–4	1–2	5–2	1–1	4–0	1–1	1–5	2–4	1–0	1–1	1–10	1–2	2–5	0–2	1–3	2–0	2–0	1–2	1–1
Bewdley Town	2–3	3–2		1–3	2–1	3–0	2–1	5–2	1–0	2–1	2–2	2–1	0–2	2–0	2–1	1–2	3–1	2–1	3–3	3–2	1–2	3–2
Black Country Rangers	0–1	1–3	1–3		4–2	9–0	5–0		9–1	4–2	0–3	3–0	2–1	2–1	3–3	3–1	3–2		7–1	4–1	1–5	0–1
Bromyard Town	2–6	1–2	1–5	0–6		2–0	2–1	2–0	3–2	1–0	1–4	3–2	0–0	1–3	1–4	4–6	2–0	2–3	3–1	3–1	0–3	0–2
Bustleholme	0–11	1–3	1–2	2–6	1–3		1–5	1–2	0–3	0–6	1–5	1–2	4–3	1–4	2–3	1–2	0–6	0–4	0–4	2–4	2–3	0–1
Cradley Town	4–2	0–2	3–0	0–5	1–5	3–1		8–2	3–2	2–2	0–5	3–0	3–2	0–1	1–0	5–1	1–1	0–1	2–0	5–2	1–3	0–2
Darlaston Town	0–3	2–3	0–2	1–10	6–3	1–3	0–5			0–1	1–3	1–3	0–1	0–7	2–2	0–3	2–1	1–0	1–3	0–5	1–4	1–0
Dudley Sports	1–3	3–2	0–3	0–4	3–2	1–1	1–1	3–1		0–2	1–3	1–3	8–0	3–3	4–2	0–0	1–1	2–2	1–3	3–3	2–2	2–1
Dudley Town	1–3	3–1	1–1	1–6	2–2	3–1	4–1	1–0	1–0		0–3	3–1	2–0	2–2	6–0	0–0	4–3	3–1	2–1	3–1	1–1	3–0
Lye Town	1–0	5–2	4–1	0–1	11–1	3–0	4–3	6–0	2–0	3–1		2–2	2–2	2–2	3–1	3–2	1–1	1–2	3–1	2–0	0–0	3–2
Malvern Town	0–2	3–2	1–1	1–4	1–2	1–0	1–1	1–0	2–3	0–3	0–2		1–2	0–5	5–1	4–2	4–3	1–0	3–2	2–1	3–3	1–3
Pegasus Juniors	2–0	2–1	2–1	2–1	5–0	4–3	2–1	8–0	2–1	0–4	0–2	5–1		3–4	12–0	2–0		1–1	2–0	5–1	2–2	1–2
Shawbury United	1–2	7–0	3–1	3–6	4–1	3–2	1–0	4–0	3–2	4–1	1–2	4–4	5–0		3–2	2–2	4–1	8–1	4–0	3–0	3–4	1–1
Shifnal Town	1–2	2–3	1–3	0–3	2–4	0–0	0–1	5–3	0–1	0–3	0–4	5–0	1–2	1–2		2–1	1–2	2–0	2–3	4–0	2–1	2–3
Sporting Khalsa	1–2	2–2	4–5	2–4	3–1	8–0	2–1	3–2	3–2	3–1	1–3	0–2	1–1	1–7	3–0		0–2	1–0	1–0	2–2	2–4	3–1
Wednesfield	2–3	1–2	1–2	3–1	1–1	2–0	0–3	2–0	0–3	0–2	1–3	1–1	1–0	1–2	1–3	2–0		2–3	0–1	2–1	1–3	2–1
Wellington	0–4	1–0	1–0	0–2	2–5	2–1	1–2	3–1	2–1	3–6	1–4	2–2	3–3	2–7	2–3	1–2	2–1		1–2	2–3	1–2	3–3
Wellington Amateurs	3–5	3–0	5–1	1–6	5–1	2–0	2–2	3–2	0–1	1–1	2–3	2–2	1–4	0–2	3–1	2–1	3–0	4–2		2–2	0–2	3–1
Willenhall Town	2–1	1–3	2–2	2–5	3–1	6–2	2–3	1–4	0–4	0–3	1–3	3–2	0–3	1–7	0–0	0–4	5–3	1–2	0–0		1–2	0–2
Wolverhampton Casuals	0–1	5–1	3–0	5–0	4–1	5–0	2–1	4–2	3–1	4–1	2–0	2–0	1–3	2–1	3–3	2–1	3–0	1–0	4–1	6–0		3–3
Wolverhampton Sporting Community	0–1	3–1	3–0	1–3	3–2	4–0	0–1	4–0	1–0	0–2	2–3	1–4	1–1	2–3	2–1	6–4	0–2	2–3	5–5	2–1	1–0	

Legend: Blue = home team win; Yellow = draw; Red = away team win.
