= 2006–07 Midland Football Combination =

The 2006–07 Midland Football Combination season was the 70th in the history of Midland Football Combination, a football competition in England.

== Premier Division ==
Midland Football Combination Premier Division
- Season: 2006–07
- Champions: Coventry Sphinx
- Promoted: Coventry Sphinx
- Relegated: Alveston
- Matches: 420
- Goals: 1,399 (3.33 per match)

The Premier Division featured 18 clubs which competed in the division last season, along with three new clubs:

- Brereton Social, promoted from the West Midlands (Regional) League Division One
- Heath Hayes, transferred from the West Midlands (Regional) League
- Walsall Wood, promoted from the West Midlands (Regional) League Division One

=== League table ===
| Pos | Team | Pld | W | D | L | GF | GA | GD | Pts | Promotion or relegation |
|---|---|---|---|---|---|---|---|---|---|---|
| 1 | Coventry Sphinx | 40 | 29 | 7 | 4 | 110 | 40 | +70 | 94 | Promoted to the Midland Football Alliance |
| 2 | Castle Vale | 40 | 26 | 7 | 7 | 103 | 47 | +56 | 85 | |
| 3 | Highgate United | 40 | 25 | 9 | 6 | 90 | 38 | +52 | 81 (Note: Highgate United deducted 3 points.) | |
| 4 | Coleshill Town | 40 | 23 | 7 | 10 | 85 | 43 | +42 | 76 | |
| 5 | Pilkington XXX | 40 | 21 | 11 | 8 | 65 | 53 | +12 | 74 | |
| 6 | Southam United | 40 | 19 | 7 | 14 | 64 | 67 | −3 | 64 | |
| 7 | Bolehall Swifts | 40 | 16 | 12 | 12 | 81 | 67 | +14 | 60 | |
| 8 | Heath Hayes | 40 | 17 | 8 | 15 | 74 | 70 | +4 | 56 (Note: Heath Hayes deducted 3 points.) | |
| 9 | Barnt Green Spartak | 40 | 16 | 9 | 15 | 72 | 57 | +15 | 54 (Note: Barnt Green Spartak deducted 3 points.) | |
| 10 | Meir KA | 40 | 15 | 9 | 16 | 65 | 62 | +3 | 54 | |
| 11 | Nuneaton Griff | 40 | 15 | 8 | 17 | 85 | 71 | +14 | 53 | |
| 12 | Walsall Wood | 40 | 14 | 11 | 15 | 50 | 60 | −10 | 53 | |
| 13 | Massey Ferguson | 40 | 14 | 6 | 20 | 56 | 65 | −9 | 48 | |
| 14 | Pershore Town | 40 | 14 | 6 | 20 | 66 | 86 | −20 | 48 | |
| 15 | Brocton | 40 | 12 | 9 | 19 | 51 | 70 | −19 | 45 | |
| 16 | Brereton Social | 40 | 11 | 9 | 20 | 49 | 80 | −31 | 42 | |
| 17 | Cadbury Athletic | 40 | 11 | 9 | 20 | 48 | 85 | −37 | 42 | |
| 18 | Feckenham | 40 | 9 | 10 | 21 | 50 | 75 | −25 | 37 | |
| 19 | Continental Star | 40 | 10 | 7 | 23 | 59 | 89 | −30 | 36 (Note: Continental Star deducted 1 point.) | |
| 20 | Coventry Copsewood | 40 | 8 | 11 | 21 | 39 | 78 | −39 | 35 | |
| 21 | Alveston | 40 | 4 | 10 | 26 | 37 | 96 | −59 | 22 | Relegated to Division One |

Source: nonleaguematters
Rules for classification: 1) points; 2) goal difference; 3) number of goals scored.
