= Birmingham United F.C. =

Association football club in England

Coordinates: 52.307808°N 1.951551°W

Birmingham United
- Full name: Birmingham United Football Club
- Founded: 1992
- Ground: Valley Stadium, Redditch
- Chairman: Rajab Noor
- League: Midland League Division Two
- 2025–26: Midland League Division Two, 5th of 15
Home colours

Birmingham United Football Club is a football club originally representing the village of Barnt Green, near Bromsgrove, in Worcestershire, England. Members of the Midland League Division Two, the club are currently based in nearby Redditch and play at the Valley Stadium.

== History ==
The club was established in 1992 as a Sunday league team under the name Spar Barnt Green, joining Division One of the Bromsgrove & District League. In their first season they won the Gordon Bridgwater Cup and the LMS Shield. They retained the LMS Shield the following season, before the 1994–95 season saw them finish as runners-up in Division One, as well as winning the Gordon Bridgwater Cup, the LMS Shield and the Advertiser & Messenger Cup.

In 1997 the club joined Division Three of the Midland Combination as Barnt Green Spartak. After finishing eighth in 1999–2000, they were promoted to Division Two. The club went on to win Division Two in 2002–03, earning promotion to Division One. The following season saw them win Division One at the first attempt, resulting in promotion to the Premier Division. They won the Worcestershire Senior Urn in 2006–07, beating Alvechurch 2–1 in the final. In 2008 the club was renamed GSA Sports. However, they left the league at the end of the 2009–10 season.

Barnt Green Spartak was re-established in 2012 and joined Division Two of the Midland Combination. After winning the division in 2012–13 they were promoted to Division One. The Midland Combination merged with the Midland Alliance in 2014 to form the Midland League, with Barnt Green placed in Division Two. In February 2023 they were renamed Birmingham United.

== Ground ==
After groundsharing with Alvechurch at Lye Meadow, the club moved to Sporting Khalsa's Abbey Park Stadium in Bloxwich in 2009. When the club was reformed in 2012, home games were initially played at Pilkington XXX. The club subsequently moved to the Coppice, the home ground of Highgate United before relocating to Earlswood Town's Pavilions ground prior to the 2018–19 season. In 2023 the club moved to Redditch United's Valley Stadium.

== Honours ==
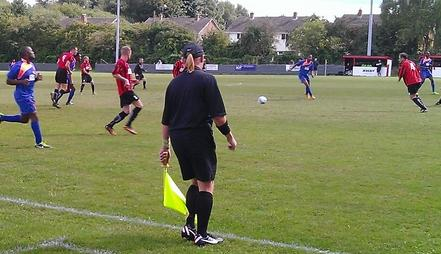
Spartak (in blue) playing Pelsall Villa in 2013

- Midland Combination
  - Division One champions 2003–04
  - Division Two champions 2002–03, 2012–13
- Bromsgrove & District League
  - Gordon Bridgwater Cup winners 1992–93, 1994–95
  - LMS Shield winners 1992–93, 1993–94, 1994–95
  - Advertiser & Messenger Cup winners 1994–95
- Worcestershire Senior Urn
  - Winners 2006–07

== Records ==
- Best FA Cup performance: Preliminary round, 2007–08
- Best FA Vase performance: Second round, 2004–05

== See also ==
- Barnt Green Spartak F.C. players
