= Dosthill Colts F.C. =

Dosthill Colts
- Full name: Dosthill Colts Football Club
- Nickname(s): The Colts
- Founded: 1990
- 2010–11: Midland Combination; Premier Division, 5th
Home colours

Dosthill Colts F.C. was a Junior's football club based in the Dosthill area of Tamworth, England. The Senior side were members of the Midland Football Combination Premier Division. They were formed in 1990 by Gary Onions and Steve Brownlees. In 2011, the first team merged with Coleshill Town. The Juniors have representative teams in the Tamworth and Central Warwickshire Leagues.
