= Heather St John's F.C. =

Association football club in England

Coordinates: 52°41′50.75″N 1°25′27.08″W

Heather St John's
- Full name: Heather St. John's Football Club
- Nickname: The Saints
- Founded: 1949
- Ground: St John's Park, Heather
- Chairman: Simon Bindley
- Manager: Shaun Hession
- League: Midland League Division One
- 2025–26: Midland League Division One, 4th of 21
- Website: hsjfc.co.uk
Home colours

Heather St John's Football Club is a football club based in the village of Heather, Leicestershire, England. They are currently members of the Midland League Division One and play at St John's Park.

== History ==
The club was established in 1949, with the name taken from a local church. They joined the Coalville & District League, and were promoted to Division One after winning Division Two in 1955–56. The club went on to win the Division One title the following season. They were league champions again in 1965–66, 1969–70 and 1970–71. In 1973 the club moved up to Division Two of the Leicester & District League, and were promoted to Division One in their first season in the league. They then became a yo-yo club; relegation to Division Two at the end of the 1976–77 season was followed by promotion back to Division One in 1980. The club were relegated again in 1980–81, promoted back to Division One the following season, and then relegated back to Division Two again at the end of the 1983–84 season.

Heather were promoted again in 1986–87, only to be relegated in 1989–90. Although they were promoted back to Division One at the first attempt, they were relegated again in 1995. Following promotion to Division One in 1996–97, the club were promoted to the Premier Division for the first time at the end of the 2000–01 season. They went on to finish as Premier Division runners-up in 2001–02. After finishing second again the following season, the club were promoted to Division Two of the Midland Combination, also changing their name to Heather Athletic. Despite only finishing fifth in their first season in the Midland Combination, the club were promoted to Division One.

In 2006–07 Heather Athletic finished sixth in Division One and were promoted to the Premier Division; at the end of the season they reverted to their original name. The club were Premier Division runners-up in 2009–10, also winning the Leicestershire and Rutland Senior Cup (with a 1–0 win against Thurmaston Town in the final) and the Tony Alden Memorial Trophy. After retaining the Senior Cup and winning the Premier Division the following season they were promoted to the Midland Alliance. The club finished bottom of the league in 2013–14, and as the league merged with the Midland Combination to form the Midland League, they were placed in Division One for the 2014–15 season.

Heather St Johns won the Leicestershire and Rutland Senior Cup for a third time in 2018–19, defeating Melton Town on penalties in the final. The season also saw them win the Division One title, earning promotion to the Premier Division. At the end of the 2020–21 season the club were transferred to the Premier Division North of the United Counties League. In 2022–23 they finished second-from-bottom of the Premier Division North and were relegated to Division One of the Midland League. The 2024–25 season saw the club finish second in Division One, qualifying for the promotion play-offs. They subsequently lost 1–0 to Coton Green in the semi-finals. In 2025–26 they finished fourth in the division, before losing 5–0 to Sutton United in the play-off semi-finals.

== Ground ==
The club originally played at Swepstone Road. When they were unable to upgrade the council-owned ground, the club bought a field on Ravenstone Road in September 1993, which was turned into St John's Park. A seated stand was built on one side of the pitch and floodlights were erected in February 1997, inaugurated with a friendly match against Leicester City.

== Management and coaching staff ==
Position	Name
Manager	Shaun Hession

== Honours ==
- Midland League
  - Division One champions 2018–19
- Midland Combination
  - Premier Division champions 2010–11
- Coalville & District League
  - Division One champions 1956–57, 1965–66, 1969–70, 1970–71
  - Division Two champions 1955–56
  - Knock-Out Cup winners 1967–68, 1970–71
- Leicestershire and Rutland Senior Cup
  - Winners 2009–10, 2010–11, 2018–19
- Leicestershire & Rutland Saturday Shield
  - Winners 1997–98
- Tony Alden Memorial Trophy
  - Winners 2010

== Records ==
- Best FA Cup performance: First qualifying round, 2019–20
- Best FA Vase performance: Fourth round, 2025–26

== See also ==
- Heather St John's F.C. players
