= Causeway United F.C. =

Coordinates: 52°27′13.83″N 2°03′27.76″W

Causeway United
- Full name: Causeway United Football Club
- Nickname: The Blues
- Founded: 1957
- Dissolved: 2015
- Ground: The Grove, Halesowen (Groundshare with Halesowen Town)
- League: Midland League Premier Division
- 2014–15: Midland League Premier Division, 14th
Home colours	Away colours

Causeway United Football Club was a football club based in Halesowen, England, but originally from Oldbury.

== History ==
Causeway United FC was formed in 1957 and derived its name from the Causeway Green area of Oldbury (now part of Sandwell). Causeway initially joined the Oldbury and District Amateur League, which later became the Warley Combination Amateur League. An early star of the team was Leo Sharpe, the father of future Manchester United star Lee Sharpe.

In 1972 the club joined the Birmingham Amateur Football Association where they were to play for the next 25 years, winning the Intermediate Cup in 1990–91 and the Premier Division in 1996–97 and 1997–98. In 1998 the club moved from the Somers Sports Ground to share the ground of Halesowen Town, and in the same year gained admission to the West Midlands (Regional) League, initially in Division One South.

In their very first season in the league Causeway finished as runners-up to Wellington and were promoted to the Premier Division, where their first season saw them finish in second place with 104 points. In 2001–02 they went one better, winning the league and with it promotion to the Midland Football Alliance.

Before the start of the 2006–07 season, Halesowen Town terminated the ground share agreement with Causeway. Causeway played at the Memorial Ground in Amblecote after agreeing a ground share arrangement with Stourbridge for the 2007–08 season before returning to share Halesowen Town's ground in 2013.

The club folded in 2015, citing financial difficulties.

== Club records ==
- Best League performance: 6th in Midland Football Alliance, 2007–08
- Best FA Cup performance: 1st qualifying round, 2003–04 and 2004–05
- Best FA Vase performance: 3rd round, 2002–03

Most appearances: Nathan Llewellyn 170 Most goals: Lorenzo Heath 240
