= Bartley Green F.C. =

Bartley Green
- Full name: Bartley Green Football Club
- Nickname: The Owls
- Founded: 1949
- Dissolved: 2014
- Ground: Illey Lane; Halesowen
- 2012–13: West Midlands (Regional) League; Premier Division, 16th
Home colours

Bartley Green F.C. was an English football club originally based in Bartley Green, a residential suburban area of Birmingham, in the West Midlands. They folded near the end of the 2013–14 season with immediate effect.

== History ==
Bartley Green F.C. was founded in the 1950s as a Saturday football team; however, since the 1970s, most of the club's football has been played in Sunday League and cup competitions. In the 2005–06 season, they joined the Midland Combination Division Two and were league champions. Since the 2005–06 season, the club has entered a parallel Saturday league side in addition to its usual team. After two seasons in the Midland Combination League, winning Division Two in 2005–06 and then taking the Division One title in 2006–07 in successive seasons, the club was promoted into the Midland Combination Premier League.

Floodlights were erected in 2008–09, which led to the club meeting the Midland Combination standards required regarding their ground and facilities.

The club also won its first trophy in the 2010–11 season, beating Fairfield Villa 2–0 to lift the Smedley Crooke Cup. Then again two seasons later, in the 2012–13 season, Bartley Green lifted the Smedley Cup again. This time, in an eight-goal match, Bartley Green won 5–3 against Phoenix United.

The club transferred to the West Midlands (Regional) League Premier Division after the 2011–12 season. In February 2014, an off-the-field incident, in which a club stewardess was awarded £18,832 in compensation following unfair dismissal, contributed to the club's subsequent decline amid financial concerns. The club resigned from the league midway through the 2013–14 season.

== League ==
Season	Division	Position	Significant Events
Joined the Midland Combination Division Three in 1979
1979–1980	Midland Combination Division Three	6th	–
1980–1981	Midland Combination Division Three	8th	–
Left The Midland Combination
Joined the Midland Combination Division Two in 2005
2005–2006	Midland Combination Division Two	1st	Champions
2006–2007	Midland Combination Division One	1st	Champions
2007–2008	Midland Combination Premier Division	14th	–
2008–2009	Midland Combination Premier Division	18th	–
2009–2010	Midland Combination Premier Division	10th	–
2010–2011	Midland Combination Premier Division	12th	–
Joined the West Midlands Regional League Premier Division
2011–2012	West Midlands Regional League Premier Division	9th	–
2012–2013	West Midlands Regional League Premier Division	16th	–
2013–2014	West Midlands Regional League Premier Division	–	Club Folded
Resigned from the West Midlands Regional League Premier Division in 2013/14

== Honours ==
- Midland Combination Division One
  - Champions 2006–07
- Midland Combination Division Two
  - Champions 2005–06
- Birmingham Midweek Floodlit Cup
  - Champions 2009–10
  - Runners-up 2007–08
- Smedley Crooke Cup
  - Champions 2010–11, 2012–13

== Records ==
- FA Cup
  - First Qualifying Round 2010–11
- FA Vase
  - First Round 2008–09, 2009–10, 2011–12
