= Heath Hayes F.C. =

Association football club in England

Coordinates: 52°41′10.37″N 1°58′44.79″W

Heath Hayes
- Full name: Heath Hayes Football Club
- Nickname: The Hayes
- Founded: 1965
- Dissolved: 2023
- Ground: Coppice Colliery Ground, Heath Hayes
Home colours	Away colours

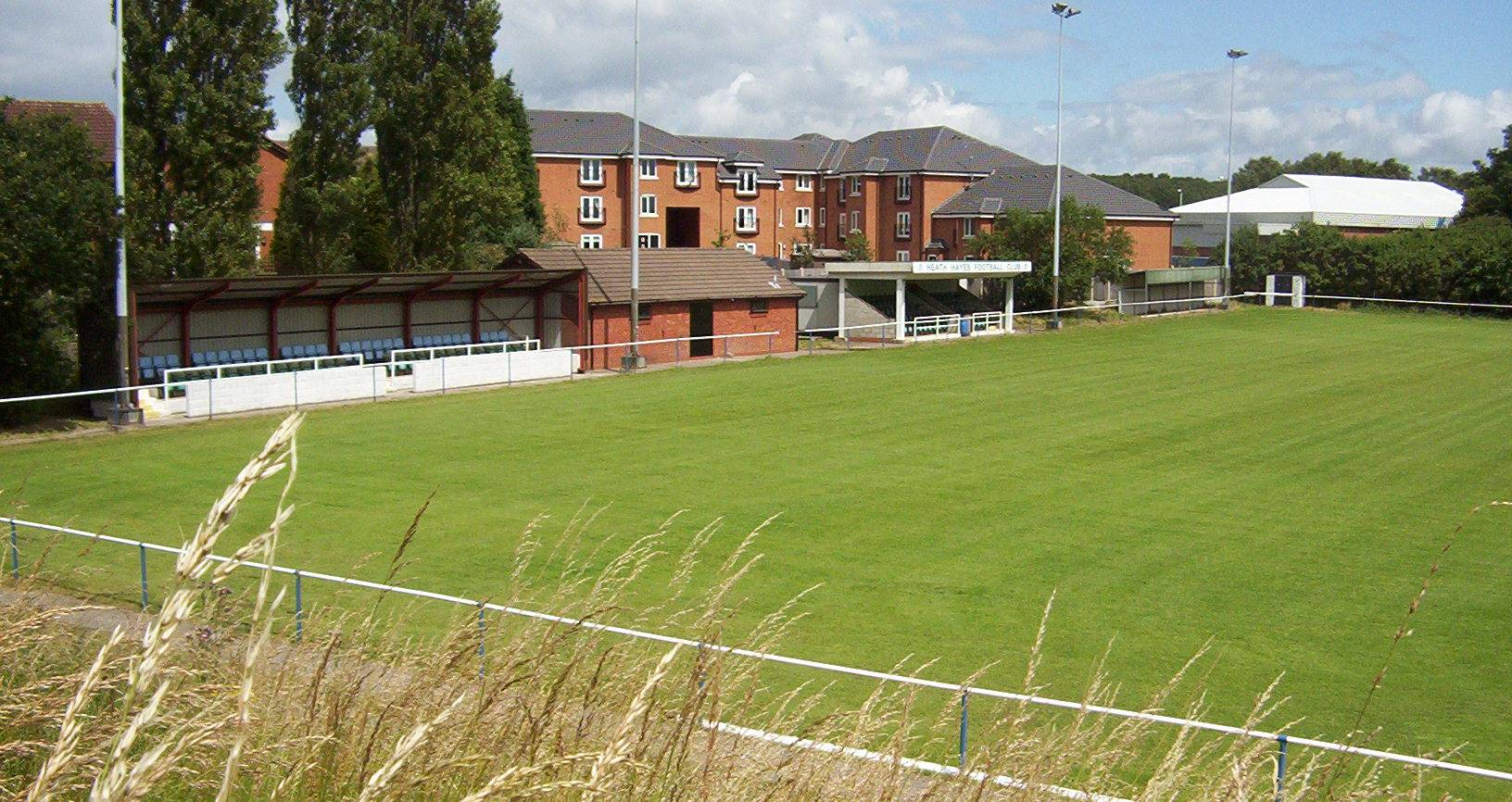
The Coppice Colliery Ground, the club's home

Heath Hayes Football Club was a football club based in Heath Hayes near Cannock, Staffordshire, England. They played at the Coppice Colliery Ground.

== History ==
The club was established in 1965 as Heath Hayes United, breaking away from the Heath Hayes Co-op Youth Club. They initially played in the Cannock Youth League, before joining Division Two of the Cannock Chase League for their second season. The club were soon promoted to Division One and then the Premier Division. After moving their base from the Five Ways Inn to the Constitutional Club, the club was renamed Heath Hayes Cons. They won the Premier Division of the Cannock Chase League in 1971–72 and 1972–73, and subsequently moved up to the Mid-Staffordshire League and then the Staffordshire County League (South).

Heath Hayes were Staffordshire County League (South) Division One champions in 1976–77 and were promoted to the Premier Division. They won the league's Premier Trophy in 1986–87 and went on to win the Premier Division title the following season. After retaining the Premier Division title in 1988–89 and returning to the Five Ways Inn in 1989, the club adopted their current name and moved up to the Staffordshire Senior League. In 1994 the league was renamed the Midland League, with Heath Hayes becoming members of Division One. In 1996 the club transferred to Division One North of the West Midlands (Regional) League. They were Division One North champions in 1998–99 season, earning promotion to the Premier Division.

In 2001–02 Heath Hayes won the Staffordshire Senior Vase with a 3–0 win over Alsager Town in the final. In 2006 the club transferred to the Premier Division of the Midland Combination. They won the Staffordshire Senior Vase again in 2008–09, beating Ball Haye Green 2–1 in the final. After winning the Premier Division title in 2009–10 the club were promoted to the Midland Alliance.

In 2014 the Midland Alliance and Midland Combination merged to form a new Midland League, with Heath Hayes placed in the Premier Division. However, they finished bottom of the division in the league's inaugural season and were relegated to Division One. The 2015–16 season saw the club win the final edition of the Staffordshire Senior Vase when they beat Lichfield City 4–0 in the final. The club folded at the end of the 2022–23 season after losing control of their ground.

== Honours ==
- Midland Combination
  - Premier Division champions 2009–10
- West Midlands (Regional) League
  - Division One North champions 1998–99
- Cannock Chase League
  - Premier Division winners 1971–72, 1972–73
- Staffordshire County League (South)
  - Premier Division champions 1987–88, 1988–89
  - Division One champions 1976–77
  - Premier Trophy Winners 1986–87
- Staffordshire Senior Vase
  - Winners 2001–02, 2008–09, 2015–16

== Records ==
- Best FA Cup performance: Preliminary round, 2009–10, 2010–11, 2012–13
- Best FA Vase performance: Third round, 2007–08, 2010–11

== See also ==
- Heath Hayes F.C. players
- Heath Hayes F.C. managers
