= Pilkington XXX F.C. =

Association football club in England

Pilkington XXX
- Full name: Pilkington XXX Football Club
- Nickname: Pilks
- Founded: 1931
- Dissolved: 2016
- Ground: Triplex Sports Association Ground; King's Norton; Birmingham
- Capacity: 1,500
- 2015–16: Midland League Division One, 6th
Home colours	Away colours

Pilkington XXX Football Club was a football club based in Birmingham, England. They joined the Midland Combination Division Three in 1998. In 2002, they changed their name from Burman Hi-Ton. They resigned from the Midland League Division One at the end of the 2015–16 season.

== History ==
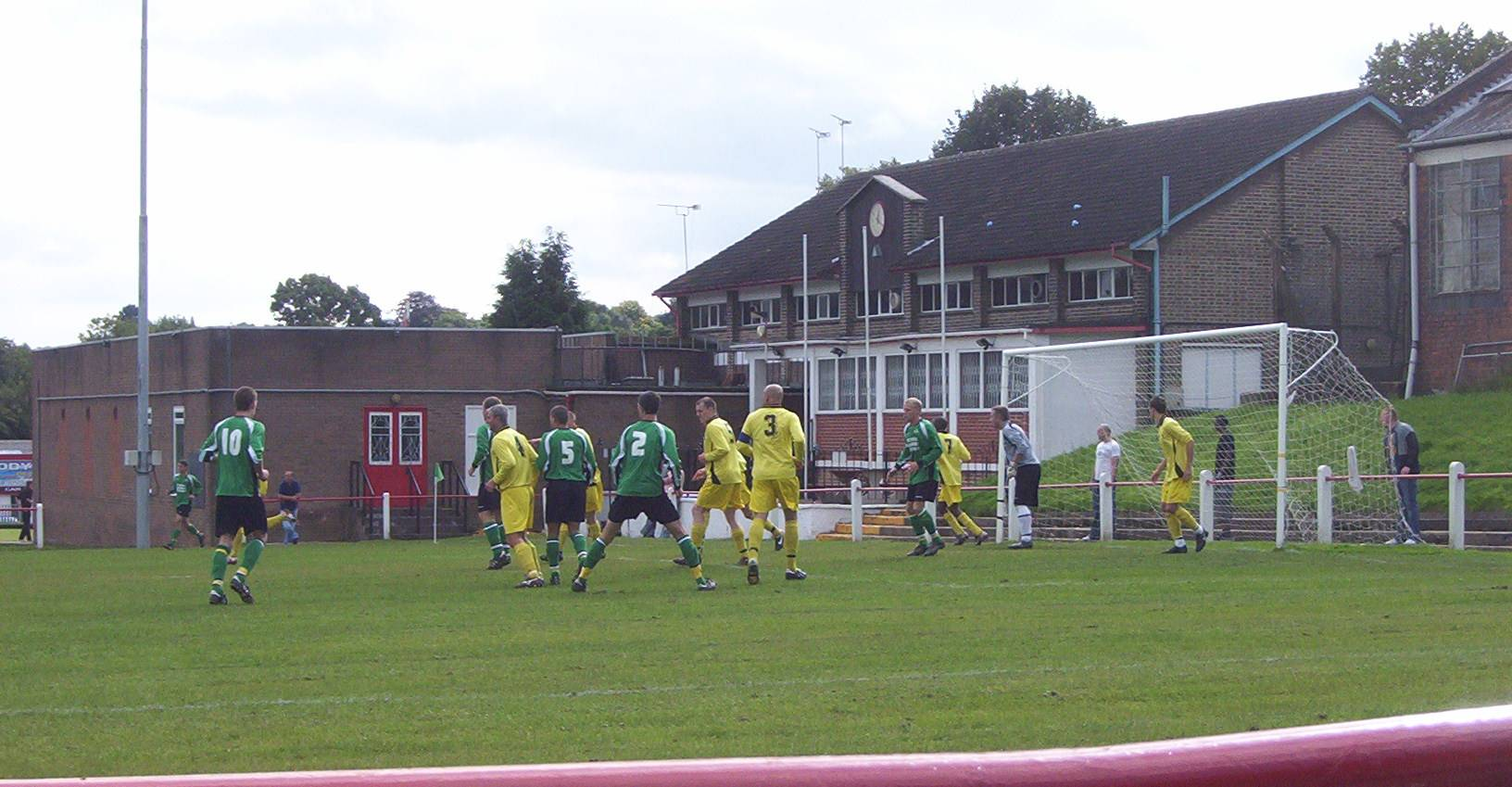
Pilkington (green shirts) take on Knowle in 2008

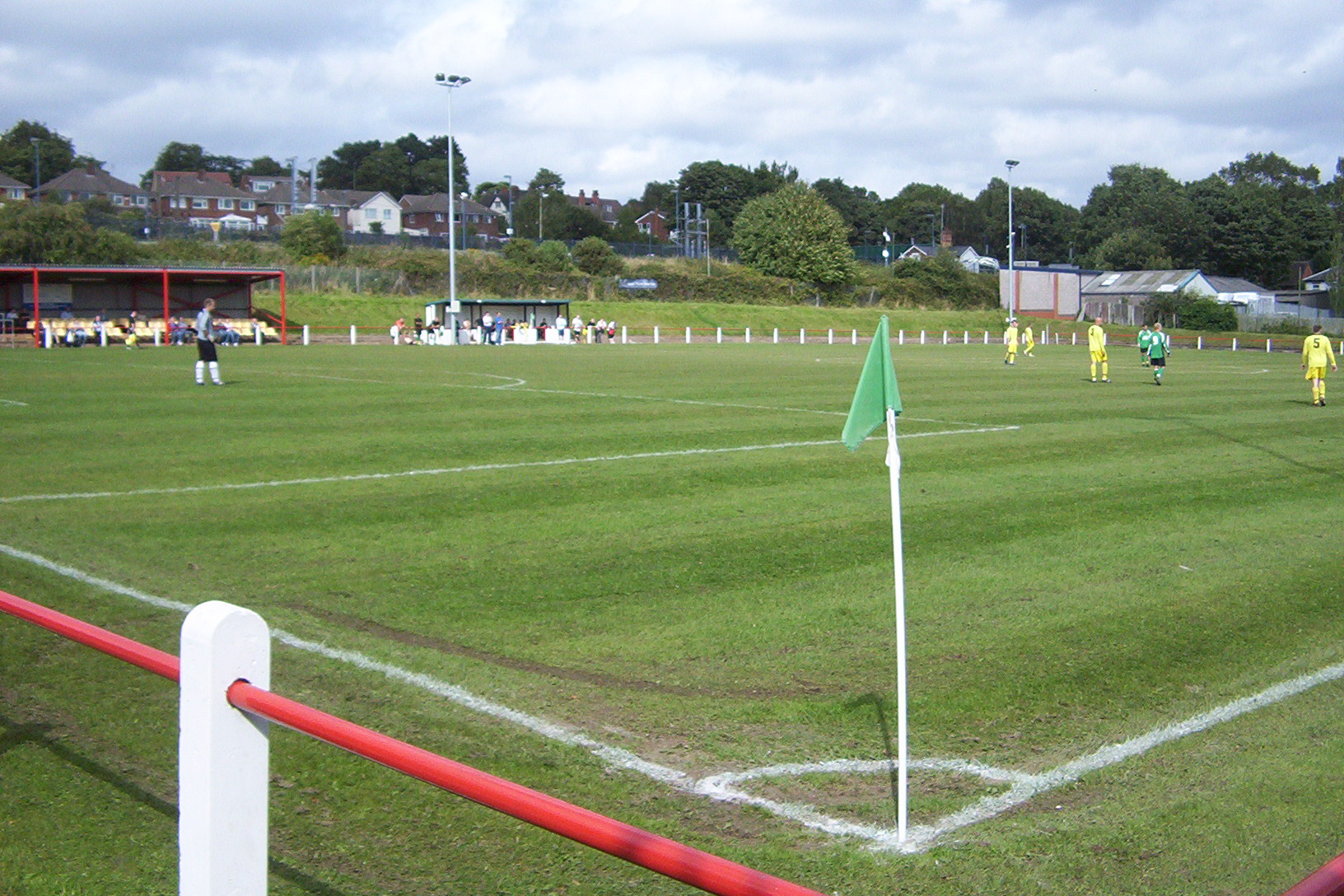
The club's home ground

It is unclear exactly when the club was formed – the club itself notes that the present name was adopted in 2002 but does not state when the earlier incarnation had actually been formed. It is known that the club, under its previous name of Burman Hi-Ton F.C., won the Birmingham Works League Division One in the 1996–97 season and joined the Midland Combination in 1998, where the team won the Division Three championship at the first attempt.

In 2001–02, the team won the Division Two title to gain promotion to Division One, whereupon the club adopted its present name. Success again came quickly in Division One, with a runners-up spot in 2003–04 gaining the team promotion to the Premier Division.

== Club records ==
- Best league performance: 5th in Midland Combination Premier Division, 2006–07
- Best FA Cup performance: First Qualifying Round 2010–11
- Best FA Vase performance: Second Round Proper, 2008–09
