= 2023–24 United Counties League =

The 2023–24 season was the 117th in the history of the United Counties League, a football competition in England. The United Counties League operates three divisions in the English football league system, the Premier Divisions North and South at Step 5 and Division One at Step 6.

The allocations for Steps 5 and 6 this season were announced by The Football Association on 15 May 2023. Starting this season, the two Step 5 divisions in the league promote two clubs each; one as champions and one via a four-team play-off. This replaced the previous inter-step play-off system. For this season only, there was only one club relegated from each of the two premier divisions.

== Premier Division North ==
United Counties League Premier Division North
- Season: 2023–24
- Champions: Sherwood Colliery
- Promoted: Sherwood Colliery; Loughborough Students
- Relegated: Pinchbeck United
- Matches: 306
- Goals: 1,003 (3.28 per match)
- Top goalscorer: Craig Westcarr (27)
- Biggest home win: AFC Mansfield 8–0 Pinchbeck United (30 September 2023)
- Biggest away win: Pinchbeck United 0–11 Loughborough Students (9 September 2023)
- Highest scoring: Pinchbeck United 0–11 Loughborough Students (9 September 2023)

The Premier Division North featured 15 clubs which competed in the division last season, along with three new clubs:

- Ashby Ivanhoe, promoted from the Midland League
- Hucknall Town, promoted from Division One
- Lincoln United, relegated from the Northern Premier League

=== League table ===
| Pos | Team | Pld | W | D | L | GF | GA | GD | Pts | Promotion, qualification or relegation |
|---|---|---|---|---|---|---|---|---|---|---|
| 1 | Sherwood Colliery (C, P) | 34 | 26 | 6 | 2 | 97 | 18 | +79 | 84 | Promoted to the Northern Premier League |
| 2 | Lincoln United | 34 | 24 | 1 | 9 | 67 | 35 | +32 | 73 | Qualified for the play-offs |
| 3 | Loughborough Students (O, P) | 34 | 21 | 7 | 6 | 83 | 32 | +51 | 70 | Qualified for the play-offs |
| 4 | Melton Town | 34 | 21 | 3 | 10 | 74 | 40 | +34 | 66 | Qualified for the play-offs |
| 5 | Skegness Town | 34 | 15 | 9 | 10 | 50 | 41 | +9 | 54 | Qualified for the play-offs |
| 6 | Sleaford Town | 34 | 17 | 2 | 15 | 44 | 48 | −4 | 53 | |
| 7 | Boston Town | 34 | 15 | 7 | 12 | 48 | 38 | +10 | 52 | |
| 8 | Eastwood | 34 | 14 | 8 | 12 | 56 | 58 | −2 | 50 | |
| 9 | Deeping Rangers | 34 | 13 | 8 | 13 | 54 | 43 | +11 | 47 | |
| 10 | Heanor Town | 34 | 14 | 6 | 14 | 65 | 67 | −2 | 45 (Note: Heanor Town were deducted 3 points for fielding an ineligible player against Pinchbeck United on 4 November 2023.) | |
| 11 | Ashby Ivanhoe | 34 | 13 | 3 | 18 | 63 | 66 | −3 | 42 | |
| 12 | Newark and Sherwood United | 34 | 11 | 9 | 14 | 51 | 55 | −4 | 42 | |
| 13 | Belper United | 34 | 11 | 8 | 15 | 48 | 67 | −19 | 41 | |
| 14 | Kimberley Miners Welfare | 34 | 10 | 5 | 19 | 40 | 59 | −19 | 35 | |
| 15 | Wisbech Town | 34 | 8 | 10 | 16 | 52 | 62 | −10 | 34 | |
| 16 | AFC Mansfield | 34 | 9 | 4 | 21 | 50 | 87 | −37 | 31 | |
| 17 | Hucknall Town | 34 | 4 | 9 | 21 | 32 | 74 | −42 | 21 | |
| 18 | Pinchbeck United (R) | 34 | 6 | 3 | 25 | 29 | 113 | −84 | 21 | Relegated to the Eastern Counties League |

Source: The FA Full-Time
Rules for classification: 1) points; 2) goal difference; 3) number of goals scored; 4) number of matches won; 5) head-to-head results
(C) Champions; (O) Play-off winners; (P) Promoted; (R) Relegated

=== Play-offs ===
Semi-finals
2 | Lincoln United | 1
5 | Skegness Town | 3
3 | Loughborough Students | 1
4 | Melton Town | 0

Final
3 | Loughborough Students | 7
5 | Skegness Town | 0

==== Semifinals ====
| 20 April | Loughborough Students | 1–0 | Melton Town | Loughborough |
| 15:00 | Bangura 78' | Report | | Stadium: Loughborough University Stadium; Attendance: 265; Referee: Paul Mcvey |

| 20 April | Lincoln United | 1–3 | Skegness Town | Lincoln |
| 15:00 | Wright 41' | Report | Wressell 16'; Floyd 84'; Acar 88' | Stadium: Ashby Avenue; Attendance: 251; Referee: Brian O'Sullivan |

==== Final ====
| 27 April | Loughborough Students | 7–0 | Skegness Town | Loughborough |
| 15:00 | Edwards 7'; Spiteri 11'; O'Toole 13'; Wicks 15'; Bangura 45+2'; Morales 80'; Thew 90+2' | Report | | Stadium: Loughborough University Stadium; Attendance: 672; Referee: Ryan Haynes |

=== Stadia and locations ===
Location of the Premier Division North clubs

| Club | Location | Stadium | Capacity |
|---|---|---|---|
| Ashby Ivanhoe | Ashby-de-la-Zouch | NFU Sports Ground | |
| Belper United | Eastwood | Coronation Park | |
| Eastwood | Eastwood | Coronation Park | |
| Boston Town | Boston | Tattershall Road | 6,000 |
| Deeping Rangers | Market Deeping | Haydon Whitham Stadium | 2,000 |
| Heanor Town | Heanor | Town Ground | 2,700 |
| Hucknall Town | Hucknall | RM Stadium | 4,000 |
| Kimberley Miners Welfare | Kimberley | Stag Ground | |
| Lincoln United | Lincoln | Ashby Avenue | 2,200 |
| Loughborough Students | Loughborough | Loughborough University Stadium | 3,000 |
| AFC Mansfield | Mansfield (Forest Town) | Forest Town Stadium | |
| Melton Town | Melton Mowbray | Melton Sports Village | |
| Newark and Sherwood United | Newark-on-Trent | Hawton Lane | |
| Pinchbeck United | Spalding | Sir Halley Stewart Field | 2,700 |
| Sherwood Colliery | Mansfield Woodhouse | Debdale Park | |
| Skegness Town | Skegness | Vertigo Stadium | |
| Sleaford Town | Sleaford | Eslaforde Park | 1,000 |
| Wisbech Town | Wisbech | Fenland Stadium | 1,118 |

== Premier Division South ==
United Counties League Premier Division South
- Season: 2023–24
- Champions: Wellingborough Town
- Promoted: Wellingborough Town; Racing Club Warwick
- Relegated: Desborough Town
- Matches: 380
- Goals: 1,348 (3.55 per match)
- Top goalscorer: Leon Lobjoit (Daventry Town); Nehemiah Richard-Noel (Wellingborough Town) (25 goals)
- Biggest home win: Daventry Town 7–0 GNG Oadby Town (15 August 2023)
- Biggest away win: Coventry United 0–6 St Neots Town (13 January 2024); GNG Oadby Town 0–6 Newport Pagnell Town (26 August 2023)
- Highest scoring: Racing Club Warwick 8–2 Bugbrooke St Michaels (9 December 2023); Aylestone Park 5–5 Rugby Borough (28 October 2023)

The Premier Division South featured 13 clubs which competed in the division last season, along with seven new clubs.

- Relegated from the Northern Premier League:
  - Daventry Town
  - St Neots Town
  - Yaxley
- Plus:
  - Aylestone Park, promoted from Division One
  - Leicester Nirvana, transferred from the Premier Division North
  - Racing Club Warwick, transferred from the Midland League
  - Rugby Borough, promoted from the Spartan South Midlands League

=== League table ===
| Pos | Team | Pld | W | D | L | GF | GA | GD | Pts | Promotion, qualification or relegation |
|---|---|---|---|---|---|---|---|---|---|---|
| 1 | Wellingborough Town (C, P) | 38 | 29 | 5 | 4 | 92 | 32 | +60 | 92 | Promoted to the Northern Premier League |
| 2 | Racing Club Warwick (O, P) | 38 | 24 | 8 | 6 | 90 | 44 | +46 | 80 | Qualified for the play-offs |
| 3 | Aylestone Park | 38 | 25 | 5 | 8 | 103 | 60 | +43 | 80 | Qualified for the play-offs |
| 4 | St Neots Town | 38 | 22 | 9 | 7 | 74 | 35 | +39 | 75 | Qualified for the play-offs |
| 5 | March Town United | 38 | 22 | 9 | 7 | 69 | 40 | +29 | 75 | Qualified for the play-offs |
| 6 | Newport Pagnell Town | 38 | 20 | 5 | 13 | 74 | 54 | +20 | 62 (Note: Newport Pagnell Town were deducted 3 points for fielding an ineligible player against Godmanchester Rovers on 18 November 2023.) | |
| 7 | Yaxley | 38 | 16 | 8 | 14 | 78 | 63 | +15 | 56 | |
| 8 | GNG Oadby Town | 38 | 16 | 7 | 15 | 74 | 89 | −15 | 55 | |
| 9 | Daventry Town | 38 | 16 | 3 | 19 | 79 | 69 | +10 | 51 | |
| 10 | Bugbrooke St Michaels | 38 | 15 | 5 | 18 | 72 | 81 | −9 | 50 | |
| 11 | Histon | 38 | 14 | 8 | 16 | 64 | 73 | −9 | 50 | |
| 12 | Lutterworth Town | 38 | 15 | 4 | 19 | 57 | 72 | −15 | 49 | |
| 13 | Easington Sports | 38 | 14 | 8 | 16 | 60 | 59 | +1 | 47 (Note: Easington Sports were deducted 3 points for fielding an ineligible player against Daventry Town on 31 January 2024.) | |
| 14 | Coventry United | 38 | 13 | 7 | 18 | 74 | 75 | −1 | 46 | |
| 15 | Cogenhoe United | 38 | 12 | 9 | 17 | 43 | 71 | −28 | 45 | Resignation from the league |
| 16 | Rugby Borough | 38 | 10 | 6 | 22 | 68 | 92 | −24 | 36 | |
| 17 | Eynesbury Rovers | 38 | 9 | 5 | 24 | 48 | 88 | −40 | 31 (Note: Eynesbury Rovers were deducted 1 point for fielding an ineligible player against St Neots Town on 26 December 2023.) | |
| 18 | Godmanchester Rovers | 38 | 9 | 4 | 25 | 44 | 87 | −43 | 31 | |
| 19 | Leicester Nirvana | 38 | 6 | 11 | 21 | 50 | 88 | −38 | 29 | |
| 20 | Desborough Town (R) | 38 | 6 | 8 | 24 | 35 | 76 | −41 | 26 | Relegated to the Spartan South Midlands League |

Source: The FA Full-Time
Rules for classification: 1) points; 2) goal difference; 3) number of goals scored; 4) number of matches won; 5) head-to-head results
(C) Champions; (O) Play-off winners; (P) Promoted; (R) Relegated

=== Play-offs ===
Semi-finals
2 | Racing Club Warwick | 4
5 | March Town United | 0
3 | Aylestone Park | 2 (7)
4 | St Neots Town | 2 (6)

Final
2 | Racing Club Warwick | 2
3 | Aylestone Park | 1

==== Semifinals ====
| 20 April | Aylestone Park | 2–2 (a.e.t.) (7–6 p) | St Neots Town | Leicester |
| 15:00 | Bucalossi 9' (pen.), 33' | Report | Thorpe 25'; Goff 90+6' | Stadium: Saffron Lane; Attendance: 597; Referee: Paul Mihalache |

| 20 April | Racing Club Warwick | 4–0 | March Town United | Warwick |
| 15:00 | Cobourne 8'; Willis 14'; Carsley 60'; Shearer 90' | Report | | Stadium: Townsend Meadow; Attendance: 552; Referee: Phoebe Horner |

==== Final ====
| 27 April | Racing Club Warwick | 2–1 | Aylestone Park | Warwick |
| 15:00 | Monaghan 17'; Willis 65' | Report | Hollis 89' | Stadium: Townsend Meadow; Attendance: 1,024; Referee: Chris Walton |

=== Stadia and locations ===
Location of the Premier Division South clubs

| Club | Location | Stadium | Capacity |
|---|---|---|---|
| Aylestone Park | Leicester | Saffron Lane | 1,128 |
| Bugbrooke St Michaels | Bugbrooke | Birds Close | 2,500 |
| Cogenhoe United | Cogenhoe | Compton Park | 5,000 |
| Coventry United | Coventry | Butts Park Arena (Note: home of Coventry Rugby Club (groundshare)) | 4,000 |
| Daventry Town | Daventry | Elderstubbs | 1,855 |
| Desborough Town | Desborough | Waterworks Field | |
| Easington Sports | Easington | Addison Road | |
| Eynesbury Rovers | Eynesbury | Alfred Hall Memorial Ground | |
| GNG Oadby Town | Leicester | Riverside | 3,000 |
| Godmanchester Rovers | Godmanchester | Bearscroft Lane | |
| Histon | Impington | Bridge Road | 4,300 |
| Leicester Nirvana | Leicester | Hamilton Park | |
| Lutterworth Town | Lutterworth | Dunley Way | |
| March Town United | March | GER Sports Ground | |
| Newport Pagnell Town | Newport Pagnell | Willen Road | 2,000 |
| Racing Club Warwick | Warwick | Townsend Meadow | 1,280 |
| Rugby Borough | Rugby | Kilsby Lane | |
| St Neots Town | St Neots | New Rowley Park | 3,500 |
| Wellingborough Town | Wellingborough | London Road | 2,500 |
| Yaxley | Yaxley | Leading Drove | 1,000 |

== Division One ==
United Counties League Division One
- Season: 2023–24
- Champions: Bourne Town
- Promoted: Bourne Town; Harrowby United; Newark Town
- Relegated: Asfordby
- Matches: 420
- Goals: 1,507 (3.59 per match)
- Top goalscorer: Jack Thatcher (Dunkirk) (38 goals)
- Biggest home win: Bourne Town 8–0 Clifton All Whites (6 April 2024); Kirby Muxloe 8–0 Clifton All Whites (9 December 2023)
- Biggest away win: Sandiacre Town 1–7 Kirby Muxloe (29 July 2023)
- Highest scoring: Bourne Town 8–0 Clifton All Whites (6 April 2024); Rainworth Miners Welfare 6–2 Sandiacre Town (19 March 2024); Kirby Muxloe 6–2 West Bridgford (2 March 2024); Kirby Muxloe 3–5 Radford (16 December 2023); Kirby Muxloe 8–0 Clifton All Whites (9 December 2023); Clipstone 4–4 Radford (1 November 2023); Bourne Town 7–1 Holwell Sports (4 October 2023); Clipstone 7–1 Kirby Muxloe (30 September 2023); Rainworth Miners Welfare 2–6 Newark Town (22 August 2023); Sandiacre Town 1–7 Kirby Muxloe (29 July 2023)

Division One featured 17 clubs which competed in the division last season, along with four new clubs:

- Asfordby, promoted from the Leicestershire Senior League
- Lutterworth Athletic, transferred from the Spartan South Midlands League
- Sandiacre Town, promoted from the Nottinghamshire Senior League
- Selston, relegated from the Premier Division North

Also, St Andrews changed name to Leicester St Andrews.

=== League table ===
| Pos | Team | Pld | W | D | L | GF | GA | GD | Pts | Promotion, qualification or relegation |
|---|---|---|---|---|---|---|---|---|---|---|
| 1 | Bourne Town (C, P) | 40 | 35 | 3 | 2 | 110 | 25 | +85 | 108 | Promoted to the Premier Division North |
| 2 | Clipstone | 40 | 30 | 4 | 6 | 119 | 50 | +69 | 94 | Qualified for the play-offs |
| 3 | Newark Town (P) | 40 | 21 | 11 | 8 | 108 | 65 | +43 | 74 | Qualified for the play-offs |
| 4 | Dunkirk | 40 | 22 | 6 | 12 | 85 | 60 | +25 | 72 | Qualified for the play-offs |
| 5 | Harrowby United (O, P) | 40 | 21 | 8 | 11 | 88 | 48 | +40 | 71 | Qualified for the play-offs |
| 6 | Kirby Muxloe | 40 | 21 | 6 | 13 | 99 | 71 | +28 | 69 | Transferred to the Midland League |
| 7 | Blackstones | 40 | 20 | 8 | 12 | 75 | 47 | +28 | 68 | |
| 8 | Radford | 40 | 18 | 10 | 12 | 78 | 56 | +22 | 64 | |
| 9 | Saffron Dynamo | 40 | 18 | 10 | 12 | 60 | 44 | +16 | 64 | Transferred to the Midland League |
| 10 | Birstall United | 40 | 17 | 9 | 14 | 73 | 60 | +13 | 60 | Transferred to the Midland League |
| 11 | Leicester St Andrews | 40 | 14 | 10 | 16 | 57 | 69 | −12 | 52 | Transferred to the Midland League |
| 12 | Gedling Miners Welfare | 40 | 15 | 6 | 19 | 79 | 75 | +4 | 51 | |
| 13 | Clifton All Whites | 40 | 14 | 8 | 18 | 61 | 77 | −16 | 50 | |
| 14 | Selston | 40 | 12 | 8 | 20 | 54 | 82 | −28 | 44 | |
| 15 | Holwell Sports | 40 | 12 | 5 | 23 | 59 | 109 | −50 | 41 | |
| 16 | Southwell City | 40 | 11 | 7 | 22 | 56 | 85 | −29 | 40 | |
| 17 | Lutterworth Athletic | 40 | 10 | 7 | 23 | 50 | 85 | −35 | 37 | Transferred to the Midland League |
| 18 | Rainworth Miners Welfare | 40 | 10 | 7 | 23 | 61 | 101 | −40 | 37 | |
| 19 | West Bridgford | 40 | 8 | 9 | 23 | 51 | 84 | −33 | 33 | |
| 20 | Sandiacre Town | 40 | 9 | 3 | 28 | 44 | 108 | −64 | 30 | |
| 21 | Asfordby (R) | 40 | 7 | 5 | 28 | 40 | 106 | −66 | 26 | Relegation to the Leicestershire Senior League |

Source: The FA Full-Time
Rules for classification: 1) points; 2) goal difference; 3) number of goals scored; 4) number of matches won; 5) head-to-head results
(C) Champions; (O) Play-off winners; (P) Promoted; (R) Relegated

=== Play-offs ===
Semi-finals
3 | Newark Town | 3
4 | Dunkirk | 2
2 | Clipstone | 1
5 | Harrowby United | 4

Final
3 | Newark Town | 1
5 | Harrowby United | 2

==== Semifinals ====
| 27 April | Newark Town | 3–2 | Dunkirk | Newark-on-Trent |
| 15:00 | Lloyd 23'; Lewis 36'; Hales 55' | Report | Thatcher 65', 72' (pen.) | Stadium: YMCA Sports Village; Attendance: 509; Referee: Lewis Saunders-Johnson |

| 27 April | Clipstone | 1–4 | Harrowby United | Clipstone |
| 15:00 | Curtis 45' | Report | King 15', 33', 85' (pen.); Allcock 64' | Stadium: The Lido Ground; Attendance: 298; Referee: Robert Pealing |

==== Final ====
| 4 May | Newark Town | 1–2 | Harrowby United | Newark-on-Trent |
| 15:00 | Smith 84' | Report | Allcock 51' | Stadium: YMCA Sports Village; Attendance: 983; Referee: Tim Eagles |

=== Stadia and locations ===
Location of the clubs in the 2023–24 United Counties League Division One

| Club | Location | Stadium | Capacity |
|---|---|---|---|
| Asfordby | Asfordby | Asfordby Acres | |
| Birstall United | Birstall | Meadow Lane | |
| Blackstones | Stamford | Lincoln Road | 1,000 |
| Bourne Town | Bourne | Abbey Lawn | 2,000 |
| Clifton All Whites | Nottingham (Clifton) | Green Lane | |
| Clipstone | Clipstone | Lido Ground | |
| Dunkirk | Nottingham (Dunkirk) | Lenton Lane | |
| Gedling Miners Welfare | Gedling | Plains Road | |
| Harrowby United | Grantham | Dickens Road | |
| Holwell Sports | Asfordby Hill | Welby Road | 1,000 |
| Kirby Muxloe | Kirby Muxloe | Ratby Lane | 3,000 |
| Leicester St Andrews | Leicester | Canal Street | 1,000 |
| Lutterworth Athletic | Lutterworth | Hall Park | |
| Newark Town | Newark-on-Trent | YMCA Sports Village | |
| Radford | Nottingham (Radford) | Selhurst Street | |
| Rainworth Miners Welfare | Rainworth | Welfare Ground | |
| Saffron Dynamo | Cosby | Cambridge Road | |
| Sandiacre Town | Sandiacre | St Giles Park | |
| Selston | Selston | Mansfield Road | |
| Southwell City | Southwell | Centenary Ground, Brinkley | |
| West Bridgford | West Bridgford | Regatta Way | |

== League Cup ==
2023–24 United Counties League Cup
Tournament details
- Country: England
- Teams: 59

Final positions
- Champions: Skegness Town (1st title)
- Runners-up: Wellingborough Town

Quarter-finals

| 17 February 2024 | Ashby Ivanhoe (PN) | 3–2 | Newark & Sherwood United (PN) | Quorn |
| 15:00 | Oshungbure 45+4'; Grouse 65'; Acott 72' | Report | Jones 41', 89', (yellow card) 67' (yellow-red card) 90+5' | Stadium: Farley Way; Attendance: 121; Referee: Adam Brierley-Lewis |

| 20 February 2024 | Lincoln United (PN) | 2–1 | Sherwood Colliery (PN) | Lincoln |
| 19:45 | Brooks 29'; Liversidge 36' | Report | Korpal 21' | Stadium: Ashby Avenue; Attendance: 127; Referee: Tim Eagles |

| 24 February 2024 | Skegness Town (PN) | 1–0 | Racing Club Warwick (PS) | Skegness |
| 15:00 | Johnson 51' | Report | Ebbutt (red card) | Stadium: MKM Stadium; Attendance: 147; Referee: Oliver Hollyoak |

| 24 February 2024 | Saffron Dynamo (D1) | 1–1 (a.e.t.) (5–3 p) | Wellingborough Town (PS) | Cosby |
| 15:00 | Armstrong | Report | Richard-Noel | Stadium: Cambridge Road; Attendance: 180; Referee: Gary Ogden |

Semi-finals

| 10 April 2024 | Skegness Town (PN) | 1–0 | Lincoln United (PN) | Skegness |
| 19:45 | Davison 45+2' | Report | | Stadium: MKM Stadium; Attendance: 156; Referee: Tim Eagles |

| 10 April 2024 | Ashby Ivanhoe (PN) | 0–6 | Saffron Dynamo (D1) | Quorn |
| 19:45 | | Report | Armstrong; Scott; Shilcock; Woolley; Kideri | Stadium: Farley Way; Attendance: 179; Referee: Ryan Haynes |

| 27 April 2024 | Ashby Ivanhoe (PN) | 0–5 | Wellingborough Town (PS) | Kirby Muxloe |
| 15:00 | | Report | Iaciofano; Richard-Noel; Solkhon | Stadium: Ratby Lane; Attendance: 120; Referee: George Younger |
Note: Wellingborough Town and Ashby Ivanhoe were reinstated in the competition, after Saffron Dynamo were deemed to have fielded ineligible players in both their quarter-final and semi-final matches. As a result a third 'semi-final' between the two was played to decide which team faced Skegness Town in the final.

Final

| 6 May 2024 | Skegness Town (PN) | 2–1 | Wellingborough Town (PS) | Grantham |
| 15:00 | Broughton 55'; Floyd 64' | Report | Milne | Stadium: Fruehauf Stadium; Attendance: 342; Referee: Mehuel Karia |
