= Kyron Stabana =

English association football player

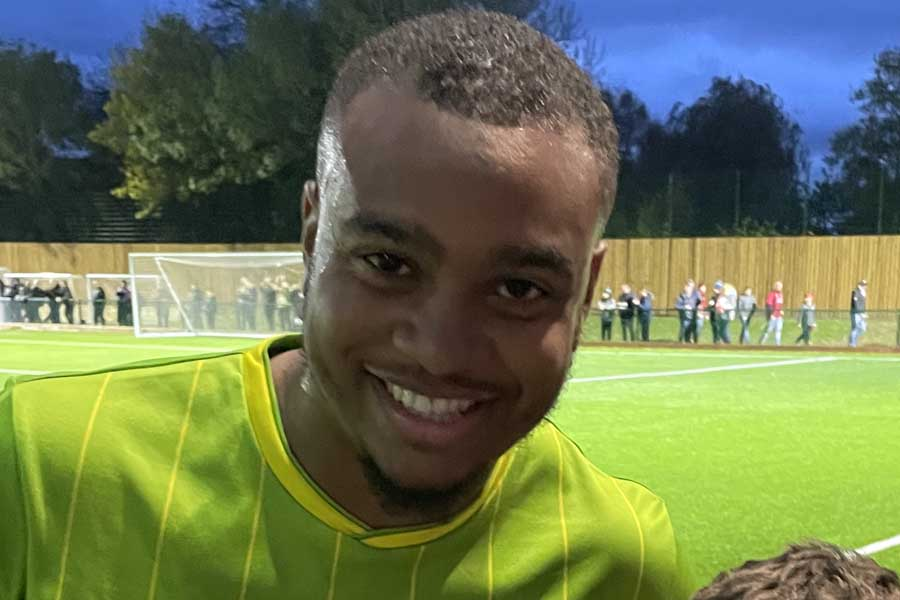
- Stabana in November 2021

Personal information
- Full name: Kyron Thomas Stabana
- Date of birth: 27 August 1998 (age 28)
- Place of birth: Leicester, England
- Height: 5 ft 9 in (1.75 m)
- Position: Defender

Team information
- Current team: GNG Oadby Town

Youth career
- 2014–2018: Derby County

Senior career*
Years	Team	Apps	(Gls)
2014–2018	Derby County	0	(0)
2017	→ Boston United (loan)	0	(0)
2018	→ Tamworth (loan)	2	(0)
2018–2020	AFC Wimbledon	0	(0)
2019	→ Tamworth (loan)	7	(0)
2020	→ Cork City (loan)	4	(0)
2020–2021	Tamworth	3	(0)
2021–2022	Barwell	38	(0)
2022-2023	Melton Town	16	(0)
2023-2026	Highfield Rangers	58	(7)
2026-	GNG Oadby Town	17	(1)

International career
2014–2015	England U17	5	(0)

Managerial career
- 2019-2023: Leicester City (Academy Coach)
- 2023–2026: Highfield Rangers (Manager)
- * Club domestic league appearances and goals as of 19:00, 22 April 2023 (UTC)

Kyron Thomas Stabana (born 27 August 1998) is an English former professional footballer and current semi professional footballer of English club GNG Oadby Town. Having previously managed Highfield Rangers for three seasons based in Leicester. They are currently members of the Leicestershire Senior League Premier Division.

== Playing career ==
=== Derby County ===
Stabana joined Derby County aged 7 as a striker. He was converted to a left and right winger aged 11 before eventually moving to right back at 14 years old. This turned out to be a good change for Stabana earning himself a scholarship at the club at 15 years old.

Stabana represented England U17s five times during his scholarship at the club, getting one assist. He signed his first professional contract with the club aged 17. He then had loan spells at Boston United and Tamworth. He was released by Derby County at the age of 19 following his second year as a professional footballer at the club.

=== AFC Wimbledon ===
Following his departure from Derby County, Stabana was announced as an AFC Wimbledon player on 30 August 2018 by under-23 development squad manager Alan Reeves, following a successful two-week trial.

Stabana had a two-month loan spell at Tamworth at the end of the 2018/19 season, featuring seven times.

Stabana made his debut for AFC Wimbledon, on 3 September 2019, in a Football League Trophy fixture at home to Brighton & Hove Albion U21, which the away team won 2–0, Stabana played the full match.

Stabana played again in the Football League Trophy on 8 October 2019, in a home fixture against Leyton Orient, the home side won 3–0, and Kyron came on as a 60th minute substitute for Scott Wagstaff.

=== Cork City (loan) ===
Manager Neale Fenn signed Stabana for Cork City on 27 January 2020, on an initial loan deal until June 2020.

He made his debut for the club on the opening day of the season, in a 0–1 loss against Shelbourne playing the full 90 minutes on 14 February 2020.

Stabana made 4 appearances for Cork City, before the season was halted in mid-March due to the COVID-19 pandemic in the Republic of Ireland. Stabana returned to AFC Wimbledon, and the club confirmed on 10 June 2020, that the player would be released on the expiry of his contract.

=== Tamworth ===
On 19 September 2020, Stabana was announced as signing for Southern League Premier Division Central side Tamworth following a successful trial period. He made his debut the same day as Tamworth drew 1–1 away at Peterborough Sports on the opening day of the season.

=== Barwell ===
Stabana made the move to Southern League Premier Central rivals Barwell. He made his debut for Barwell on 14 August 2021, in an away fixture against Lowestoft Town, and helped his new side to a 3-0 victory.

=== Melton Town ===
Stabana joined Melton in December 2022. He made 16 appearances from then until the end of the season.

== Managerial career ==
Stabana first joined Leicester City in August 2019 as an academy coach within the women's and girls department. He spent three seasons there before joining Highfield Rangers as first team manager in June 2023.

== Career statistics ==
=== Club ===
As of match played 22 April 2023

Appearances and goals by club, season and competition
Club	Season	League			National Cup		League Cup		Other		Total	
Club	Season	Division	Apps	Goals	Apps	Goals	Apps	Goals	Apps	Goals	Apps	Goals
Derby County	2016–17	Championship	0	0	0	0	0	0	3	0	3	0
Derby County	2017–18	Championship	0	0	0	0	0	0	0	0	0	0
Boston United (loan)	2017–18	National League North	0	0	0	0	—		2 (Note: Two appearances in FA Trophy)	0	2	0
Tamworth (loan)	2017–18	National League North	2	0	0	0	—		0	0	2	0
AFC Wimbledon	2018–19	League One	0	0	0	0	0	0	0	0	0	0
Tamworth (loan)	2018–19	Southern League Premier Division Central	7	0	0	0	—		0	0	7	0
AFC Wimbledon	2019–20	League One	0	0	0	0	0	0	3 (Note: Three appearances in EFL Trophy)	0	3	0
Cork City (loan)	2020	League of Ireland Premier Division	4	0	0	0	—		0	0	4	0
Tamworth	2020–21	Southern League Premier Division Central	3	0	2	0	—		0	0	5	0
Barwell	2021–22	Southern League Premier Division Central	38	0	1	0	—		1	1	41	1
Melton Town	2022-23	United Counties League	16	0	0	0	—		0	0	16	0
Career total		United Counties League	70	0	3	0	0	0	9	1	82	1
