= Ché Adams =

Scotland international footballer (born 1996)

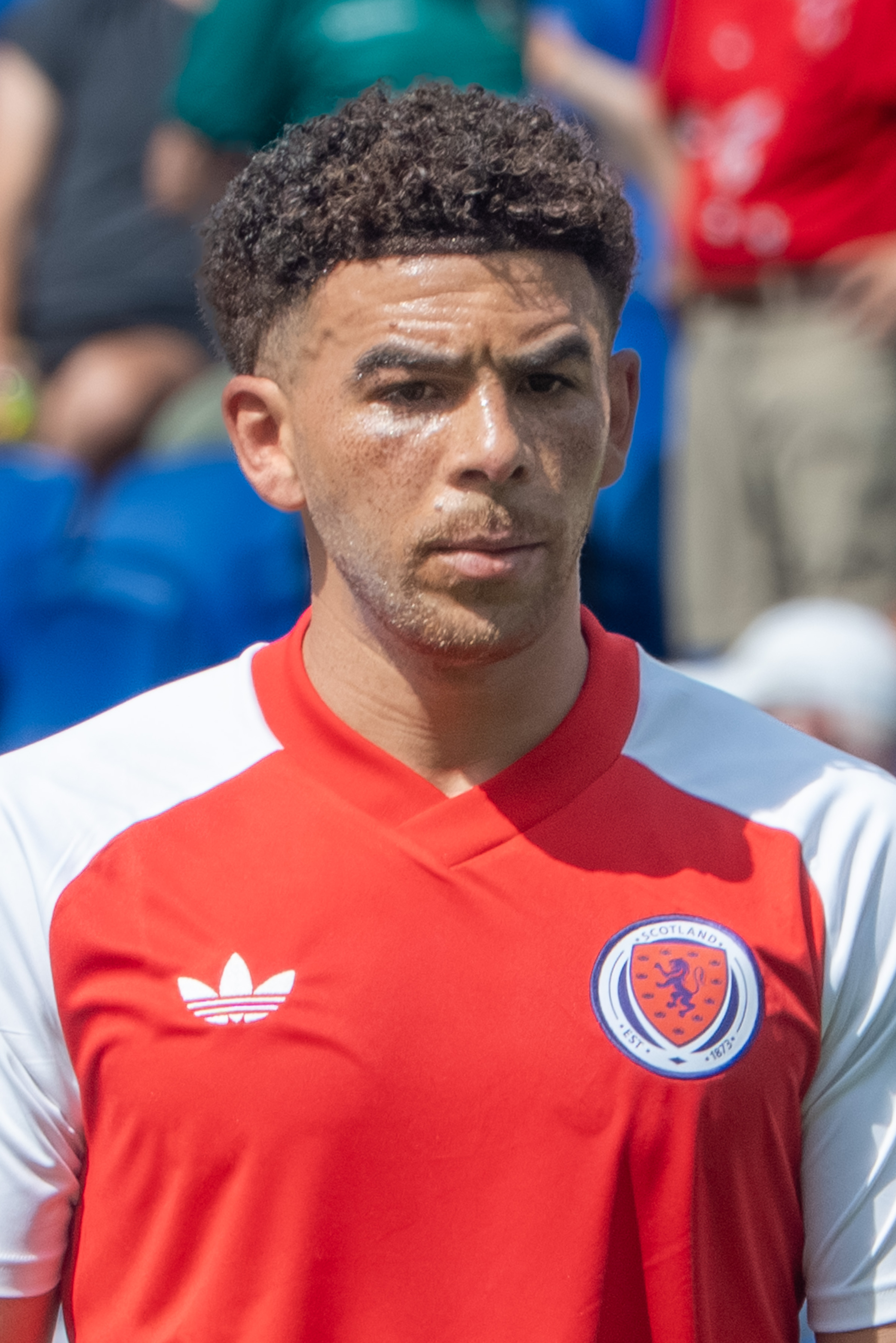
- Adams with Scotland in 2026

Personal information
- Full name: Che Sac Everton Fred Adams
- Date of birth: 13 July 1996 (age 30)
- Place of birth: Leicester, England
- Height: 5 ft 9 in (1.75 m)
- Position: Forward

Team information
- Current team: Torino
- Number: 19

Youth career
- –2003: Highfield Rangers
- 2003–2010: Coventry City
- 2010–2012: St Andrews
- 2012: Oadby Town

Senior career*
Years	Team	Apps	(Gls)
2012–2013	Oadby Town	33	(5)
2013–2014	Ilkeston	40	(9)
2014–2016	Sheffield United	47	(11)
2016–2019	Birmingham City	116	(34)
2019–2024	Southampton	164	(41)
2024–	Torino	78	(19)

International career^{‡}
2015	England U20	2	(0)
2021–	Scotland	51	(13)
- * Club domestic league appearances and goals as of 06:23, 18 November 2026 (UTC) ‡ National team caps and goals as of 22:55, 13 November 2026 (UTC)

Che Sac Everton Fred Adams (born 13 July 1996), known as Ché Adams, is a professional footballer who plays as a forward for Serie A club Torino and the Scotland national team.

Adams began his senior career in non-league football with Oadby Town and Ilkeston before moving into the Football League with Sheffield United in late 2014. He made 47 League One appearances before signing for Championship club Birmingham City in August 2016. After three seasons with Birmingham, he moved to Southampton in July 2019. He joined Italian club Torino in July 2024.

Adams represented his native England at under-20 level in 2015. He qualifies for Scotland by descent and made his senior debut in 2021. At UEFA Euro 2020 he became the first non-white player to play for Scotland at the finals of a major tournament.

== Club career ==
=== Early career ===
Adams was born in Leicester, where he played football as a youngster for Highfield Rangers. He joined Coventry City's youth academy as a seven-year-old, and was released at fourteen. He then played youth football for Leicester club St Andrews before joining Oadby Town in 2012. Initially playing for their youth team, Adams soon moved into the first team; over the 2012–13 season, the sixteen-year-old made 33 appearances for Oadby in the United Counties League, of which 27 were in the starting eleven, and scored five goals.

Adams took up a scholarship with Ilkeston's academy, and helped their team win their section of the Football Conference Youth Alliance and reach the second round proper of the 2013–14 FA Youth Cup. He was also playing first-team football in the Northern Premier League. Making his debut on 13 October as a very late substitute in a 3–2 win away to Stocksbridge Park Steels, Adams made his first league start in November, was sent off for elbowing an opponent on Boxing Day, scored his first senior goal for the club to complete a 3–1 win away to Ashton United on 5 April – he "picked up a loose ball and made a fine run through midfield and provided a left foot finish despite [the goalkeeper's] best effort to make the block" – and finished his season with the Derbyshire Senior Cup final, in which he was fouled for the penalty kick that made sure of Ilkeston's victory.

After Adams began 2014–15 in impressive fashion – introduced after 64 minutes of the second match of the season, "his pace, power and energy scar[ed] the life out of Stourbridge for the remainder of the game" as he provided two assists and was fouled for a penalty, before scoring twice in the next match, against Trafford – Ilkeston signed him to a one-year contract. He continued in similar vein: away to Stamford, Ilkeston's first and third goals were scored on the rebound when Adams' shots were parried, he was fouled for the free kick that led to the second, and "picked the ball up 35 yards out, beat a defender with ease and slid the ball home" to complete a 4–0 win; against Ashton United and FC United of Manchester, he used strength and pace to take the ball from his own half to score; and by the end of October, when 45 scouts were reported to be watching him score his ninth goal of the season to add to eleven assists, Ilkeston's chairman was resigned to his departure.

=== Sheffield United ===
On 14 November 2014, Sheffield United of League One beat off competition from clubs in higher divisions to sign Adams on a two-year deal. The fee was officially undisclosed, but the Sheffield Star reported it as a six-figure deal, and the Ilkeston club confirmed "a substantial up-front payment in non-league terms – plus a percentage of any sell-on fee." Adams made his professional senior debut on 16 December in a 1–0 home victory over Southampton, replacing Jamal Campbell-Ryce at half-time as United made it to the semi-finals of the League Cup. Four days later, he made both his first career start and his first Football League appearance in a 1–1 draw with Walsall at Bramall Lane.

In the League Cup semi-final second leg against Tottenham Hotspur on 28 January 2015 at Bramall Lane, Adams replaced Campbell-Ryce after 74 minutes. Five minutes later he had scored his first goals for Sheffield United with two goals in just over two minutes, which would have taken the game to extra time had Christian Eriksen not scored for Tottenham Hotspur in the 88th minute to win 3–2 on aggregate. Adams made ten appearances as Sheffield United finished the season in the League One play-off places. In the play-off semi-final second leg away to Swindon Town on 11 May, he replaced Ryan Flynn for the final five minutes and scored an equaliser for a 5–5 draw, but his team lost 7–6 on aggregate.

Adams scored for the first time in the league on 15 August 2015, with both goals in a 2–0 win at home to Chesterfield which was Sheffield United's first win of the season. Ten days later, he signed a new three-year deal at United with the option of an extra year. On 10 October, Adams scored twice in the first half of a 3–2 win over Rochdale, and ten days later he got another brace to defeat Fleetwood Town 3–0, opening the scoring after 54 seconds. He was given a straight red card on 5 December in the second round of the FA Cup, for a foul on Liam Kelly in a 1–0 win at Oldham Athletic. Adams established himself as a regular in the team, partnering striker Billy Sharp, but in March 2016 he was dropped to the bench by manager Nigel Adkins for not working hard in training. He soon returned, finished the season with 12 goals from 41 appearances in all competitions, 11 from 36 in League One, and was named by the Sheffield Star as its Young Player of the Year.

=== Birmingham City ===
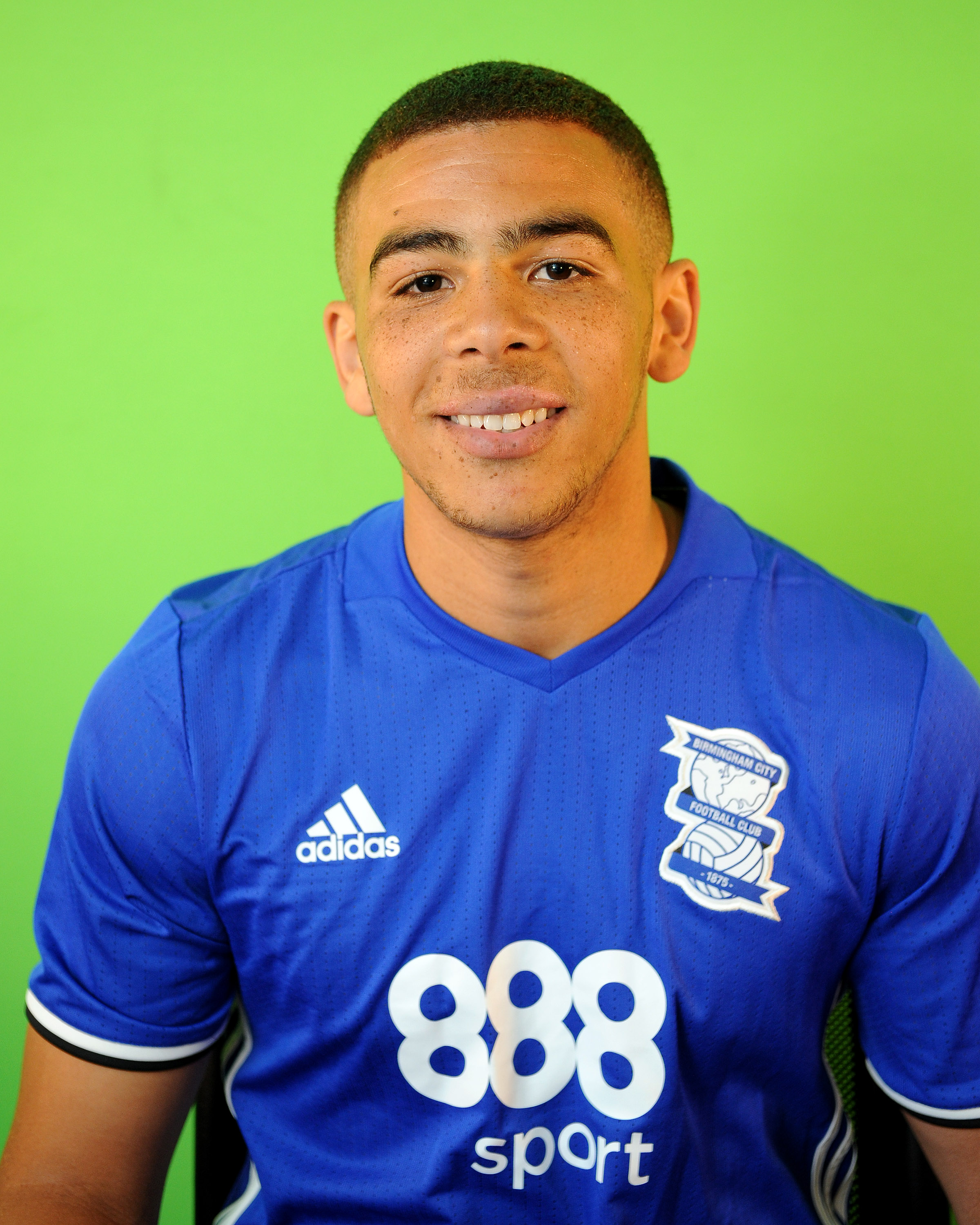
Adams with Birmingham City in 2016

==== 2016–17 season ====
Amid considerable transfer speculation, Adams played in Sheffield United's opening fixture of the 2016–17 season, but a bid was accepted from Championship club Birmingham City shortly afterwards, and he signed a three-year contract with the club on 8 August 2016. The fee was undisclosed, although the Sheffield Star reported it to be around £2 million, and that United had turned down deals valued at £1.2 million and £1.7 million. Publicity surrounding the deal caused problems for the Ilkeston club: creditors believing that Ilkeston would benefit by an estimated £300,000 called in their debts, and when no payment was immediately forthcoming, the Northern Premier League suspended the club until the debts were settled, causing the postponement of their first four league fixtures.

Adams made his Birmingham debut on 16 August, as a second-half substitute in a 1–1 draw away to Wigan Athletic. He started the next match, at home to Wolverhampton Wanderers four days later, and opened the scoring with a low angled shot across the goalkeeper; he played 61 minutes, by which time manager Gary Rowett thought he "looked like he had run out of steam", as Birmingham went on to lose 3–1. He played regularly through the first half of the season, though often as an impact substitute, and scored twice more, both times having come off the bench: to earn a draw against Preston North End in September, and a determined late winner against Bristol City in November. He returned to the starting eleven for a 4–0 defeat away at Newcastle United in December, in which his hesitancy in a defensive situation led to the second goal, but was back on the bench for the next fixture, after which Rowett was sacked. The Birmingham Mail suggested that the owners were "disgruntled" that several of Rowett's purchases, Adams included, were not regularly starting matches.

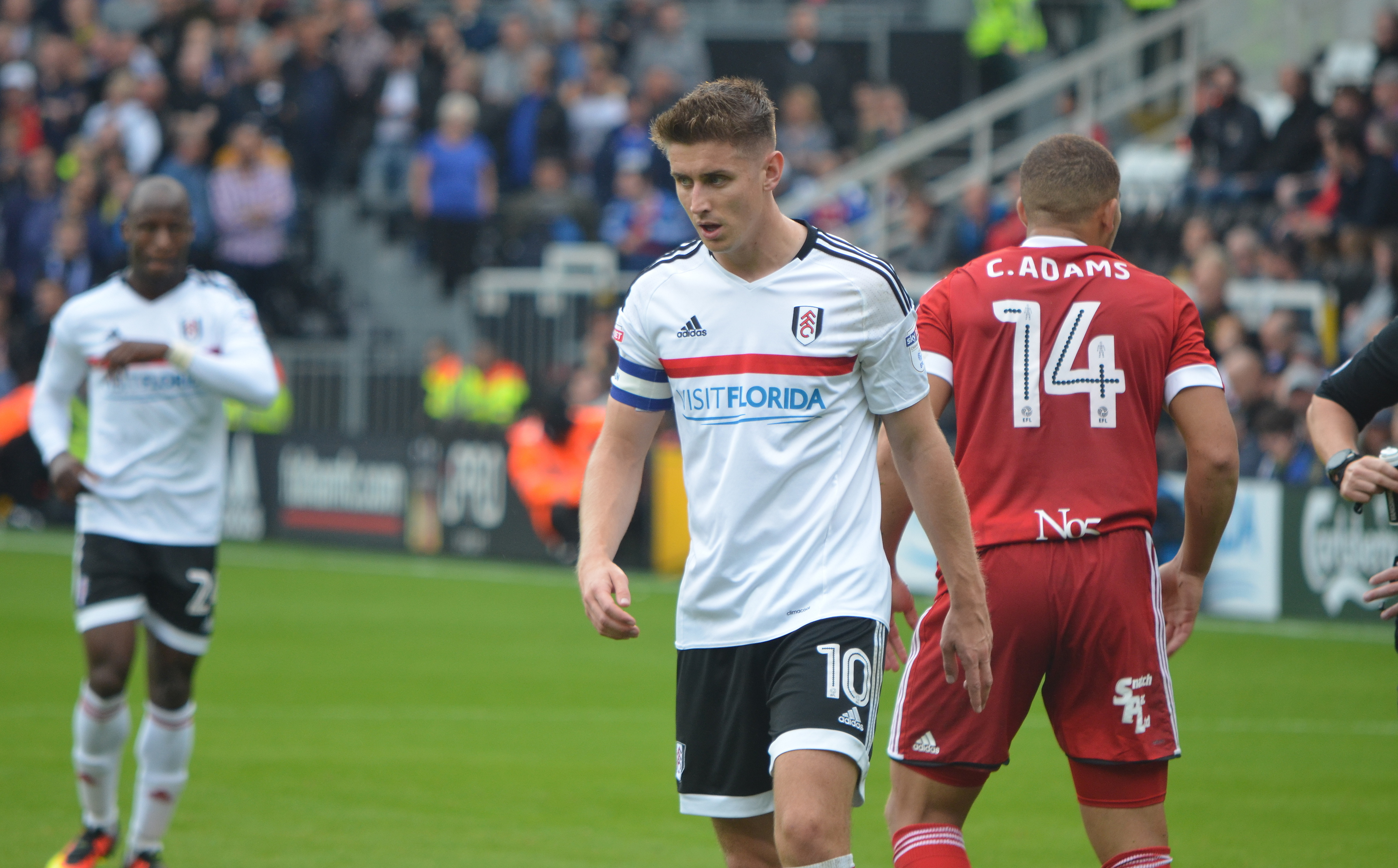
Adams (right, wearing red) playing for Birmingham City in 2016

Adams scored his first goal for three months in a losing cause away to Preston in mid-February, and was influential as Birmingham beat Wolves a few days later. Gianfranco Zola, Rowett's successor, had recognised the player's potential from the start, but was unsure of his best position. As results failed to improve, Zola experimented with formations and personnel: he alternated Adams and Lukas Jutkiewicz as lone striker, and once Clayton Donaldson returned to fitness, there was a short spell when Adams was not used at all. He started the visit to Brighton & Hove Albion, playing just behind Donaldson, and scored a goal that both he and the Mail hoped would keep him in the team.

With three matches left in the season, and relegation increasingly likely, Zola quit, to be replaced by Harry Redknapp. In the penultimate match, at home to Huddersfield Town, Adams was fouled for a penalty that Jutkiewicz missed, and was then sent off after 23 minutes for a two-footed tackle. Birmingham still won, and the red card was rescinded on appeal, making him available for the final fixture, away to Bristol City, which Birmingham had to win to be sure of staying up. After 16 minutes, Jutkiewicz played Adams through; he held off the defence and placed a low shot past the goalkeeper for the only goal of the game. He appeared in 40 of a possible 44 league matches and scored 7 goals, some way short of the target of 15 that he had set himself, but his contribution over the campaign – he also made three assists and won "nearly twice as many" penalties – earned him the club's Young Player of the Season award.

==== 2017–18 season ====
Considerable transfer speculation surrounded Adams during the summer window. It was reported that Derby County, managed by Gary Rowett, had a £3 million offer rejected and that the club turned down bids from Fulham first of £5 million and then, on deadline day, of £10 million. In September, he signed a five-year contract on improved terms. On the field, Adams began the 2017–18 season with his first senior hat-trick, against Crawley Town in the EFL Cup. In his next match, he injured a hamstring, and in his second match back, a month later, he damaged his other hamstring. He returned to the team to give Steve Cotterill a winning start as Birmingham manager at home to league-leaders Cardiff City on 13 October. According to BBC Sport's reporter, he "opted to take on the visiting defence single-handed. He put his head down and ran, slicing his way past four men in red before cutting inside to drill a low, curled right-foot shot which nutmegged Morrison before finding the right corner"; Cardiff manager Neil Warnock said that Adams' kick to an opponent's head while attempting a defensive clearance should have resulted in a penalty. After Adams' winning goal against Nottingham Forest in November, Birmingham's assistant manager, Lee Carsley, praised his finishing while reminding him that he needed to get into goalscoring positions more often. He missed most of December with yet another hamstring injury, and Cotterill used him mainly from the bench when he did return.

With the team struggling at the foot of the table, Cotterill was replaced as manager by Garry Monk, who brought both Adams and Jutkiewicz back into the starting eleven in a 4–4–2 formation. The pairing was disrupted by Adams' red card at Bolton – this time not rescinded on appeal – but he returned to provide the assist for Jacques Maghoma's winning goal against Sheffield United and a goal in the final fixture against Fulham as Birmingham's safety was confirmed. He finished the season as Birmingham's top scorer, albeit with just 9 goals, including the hat-trick against Crawley.

==== 2018–19 season ====
Ahead of the coming campaign, he chose to take over the vacant squad number 9. Still in partnership with Jutkiewicz, Adams made a slow start: he scored both goals in a 2–1 win away to Leeds United, but still only had three by mid-October. He then went on a run and had ten by mid-December. Monk highlighted the growing relationship between the pair. Adams attributed his improvement to intensive coaching from former striker James Beattie, to improved fitness training that meant he still felt strong in the later stages of a match, and to a reminder from the manager before the visit to Leeds that "he wanted that fire in my belly and just be hungrier and be a nuisance for other people." According to Jutkiewicz, "it comes with growing up, he's got more of that steel about him and wants to physically impose himself on opponents and you can see that difference."

There was considerable interest from Premier League clubs in January, but Birmingham did not want to sell, and no offer received was considered enough to force their hand given that the player could neither be replaced nor loaned back because of signing restrictions imposed by the EFL because the club were in breach of profitability and sustainability (P&S) rules. A bid of £12 million from Burnley was the highest reported. The Times suggested that the refusal to sell might constitute a further aggravated breach of the P&S rules. He had 15 goals by the end of the transfer window, and another 6 in February made him the first Birmingham player to score 20 in a season since Steve Claridge in the 1994–95 Second Division-winning season and saw him named EFL Championship Player of the Month. The citation for that award noted that "Adams has added consistency, work rate and team play to his game this season." He was named in the EFL's Championship Team of the Season and nominated, alongside Norwich City's Teemu Pukki and Sheffield United's Billy Sharp, for their Championship Player of the Season award. Despite a goal-drought in March, Adams finished the season as Birmingham's top scorer with 22, all scored in the Championship. He won both Players' and Supporters' Player of the Year Awards at the club's presentation night, although Jutkiewicz ran him close for the supporters' award, and his goal in a 3–3 draw with Swansea City in January – he "curled in a beauty from 20 yards" as Birmingham came from behind to take the lead – was named Goal of the Season.

=== Southampton ===
==== 2019–20 season ====
On 1 July 2019, Adams joined Southampton for a fee reported to be £15 million, signing a five-year contract. Adams made his Premier League debut on 10 August in a 3–0 defeat against Burnley. After being linked with a loan move to Leeds United as a replacement for Eddie Nketiah in the January 2020 transfer window, Southampton manager Ralph Hasenhüttl advised that he wanted Adams to remain part of his plans. On 22 January 2020, with Leeds head coach Marcelo Bielsa making Adams his main target, Southampton rejected a third offer for Adams, the offer (believed to be a loan fee plus the option to buy Adams permanently for £20 million) was rejected.

On 5 July 2020, Adams scored his first goal for Southampton, a 40-yard effort looping over the goalkeeper in a 1–0 victory over Manchester City. He scored his second two weeks later to wrap up the points in a 2–0 win away to AFC Bournemouth. He then scored twice in Southampton's 3–1 victory over his former club Sheffield United in the season finale on 26 July 2020.

==== 2020–21 season ====
Adams scored his first goal of the 2020–21 season on 17 October 2020 in a 3–3 draw with Chelsea. His second came a week later in a 2–0 victory over Everton. On 6 November, he scored in a 2–0 win against Newcastle United. In December 2020, he scored against Sheffield United again, helping Southampton to a 3–0 victory. During a game with West Ham United, Adams was accidentally kicked in the head by Craig Dawson, which saw him miss Southampton's match with Liverpool due to concussion. Adams did not score again until 6 March 2021, where he scored in three successive games against Sheffield United, Manchester City and Brighton & Hove Albion. Adams also scored in Southampton's 3–1 victory against Crystal Palace on 11 May 2021 and then four days later in a 3–1 victory over Fulham.

==== 2021–22 season ====
Adams scored his first goal of the 2021–22 season on 26 October 2021 in the EFL Cup, but Southampton were knocked out after Chelsea beat them 4–3 on penalties. Four days later, his first Premier League goal of the season earned Southampton a 1–0 victory against Watford at Vicarage Road and was nominated as a contender for Goal of the Month for October. Adams scored in a 2–1 defeat to Norwich City on 20 November, and in a 2–2 draw with Leicester City on 1 December. Adams was unable to face Tottenham Hotspur on 28 December after testing positive for COVID-19; the test result reached Hasenhüttl at 10pm the night before the game.

==== 2022–23 season ====
On 20 August 2022, Adams scored his first two goals of the 2022–23 season in a 1–2 victory against Leicester City after coming on as a substitute for Sékou Mara in the 59th minute. Three days later, Adams scored another brace in a 0–3 victory against Cambridge United in the EFL Cup. His next goal would not come until 19 October 2022 in a 0–1 victory against Bournemouth, which helped Southampton to their first victory in six games. Adams scored in a 3–1 defeat to Liverpool on 12 November 2022. Adams scored another brace in the EFL Cup on 21 December 2022 in a 2–1 victory against Lincoln City. On 31 January 2023, Adams scored in the EFL Cup semi-final second leg against Newcastle United, but Southampton lost 3–1 on aggregate. On 18 March 2023, Adams scored his final goal of the season in a 3–3 draw with Tottenham Hotspur. With Adams picking up an injury whilst on international duty, manager Rubén Sellés stated that he did expect Adams to return from injury until the end of April. After featuring against Bournemouth, Newcastle and Nottingham Forest, Sellés confirmed that Adams had felt more pain in his ankle which kept him out for the remainder of the season.

==== 2023–24 season ====
On 4 August 2023, Adams scored his first goal of the season in a 1–2 victory against Sheffield Wednesday after replacing Adam Armstrong in the 79th minute. Despite scoring in Southampton's three opening league games of the season, he was absent from the squad during a 2–1 victory against Queens Park Rangers amid transfer speculation. However, Adams remained at the club following the transfer window after Southampton blocked a move. He ended the season with 18 goals in all competitions.

=== Torino ===
On 23 July 2024, Adams joined Italian club Torino on a three-year contract. On his second appearance in Serie A, he assisted Ivan Ilić's equalising goal and scored the winner himself as Torino beat Atalanta 2–1. He ended his first season in Italy with 10 Goals.

== International career ==
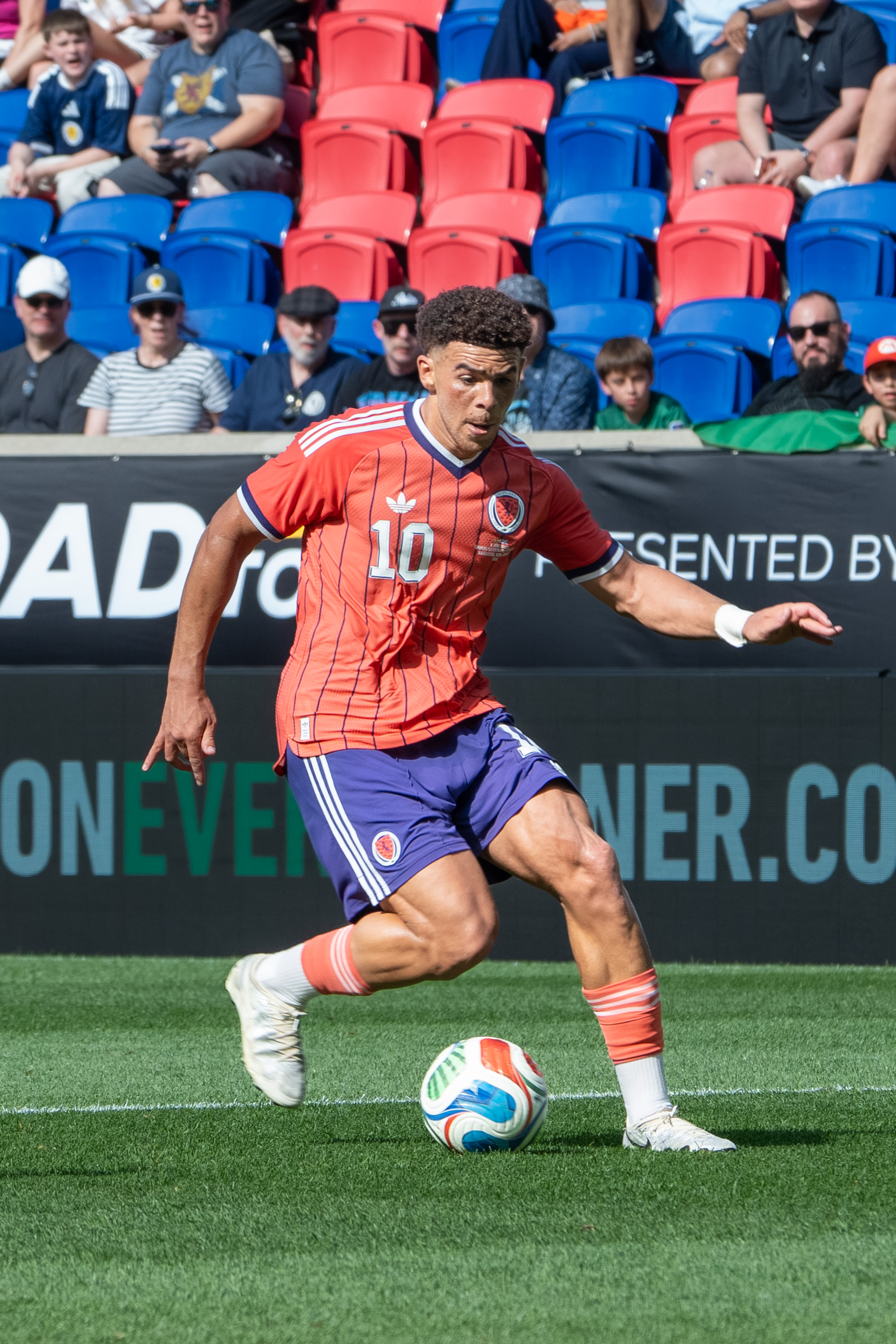
Che Adams with Scotland in 2026

Adams was eligible to represent England, his country of birth, as well as Antigua and Barbuda – his father came from Antigua – and Scotland, via his maternal grandparents hailing from Edinburgh. His maternal grandmother moved to Leicester in her early thirties.

He was invited to join the Antigua and Barbuda squad for Caribbean Cup qualifiers in October 2014, but declined. England C, the team that represents the country at semi-professional level, named Adams in the squad for an International Challenge Trophy fixture in November, but he became ineligible when he turned professional with Sheffield United. He was called up to the England U20 squad for two matches against the Czech Republic in early September 2015. He made his debut on 5 September in a 5–0 win at St George's Park, replacing Tyler Walker for the final 17 minutes, and started the second match, a 1–0 defeat.

Adams was approached by the Scottish Football Association in 2017, initially to consider playing for Scotland U21, and later for a senior friendly in November, but was not willing to commit himself at that time. In March 2021, Adams committed his allegiance to Scotland, denying reports that the prospect of featuring at UEFA Euro 2020 was his sole motivation, and was called up for the 2022 World Cup qualifiers against Austria, Israel and the Faroe Islands. He made his debut as a second-half substitute on 25 March against Austria, and scored his first goal for Scotland six days later in a 4–0 victory over the Faroe Islands. Adams was named in the 26-man squad for the delayed UEFA Euro 2020 competition, He played in all three of Scotland's group matches, starting twice, and became the first non-white footballer to play for the Scotland men's senior team in the finals of a major tournament.

On 7 June 2024, Adams was named in Scotland's squad for the UEFA Euro 2024 finals in Germany. He started the opening match of the tournament against Germany, but was substituted at half-time for defender Grant Hanley after Ryan Porteous had been red carded for the Scots. He went on to start against both Switzerland and Hungary as Scotland finished bottom of Group A with one point from three matches.

On 19 May 2026, Adams was selected in the 26-man squad for the 2026 FIFA World Cup. He won his 50th Scotland cap during their final group stage game against Brazil, thus joining the Scotland Men's International Roll of Honour.

== Style of play ==
Manager Kevin Wilson of Adams' former club Ilkeston described Adams as having "pace in abundance, but he's really powerful too" and said that "his biggest asset is that knack of changing games in the blink of an eye".

== Personal life ==
Adams was named after Argentine revolutionary Che Guevara.

== Career statistics ==
=== Club ===
As of match played 7 November 2026

Appearances and goals by club, season and competition
Club	Season	League			National cup (Note: Includes FA Cup, Coppa Italia)		League cup (Note: Includes EFL Cup)		Other		Total	
Club	Season	Division	Apps	Goals	Apps	Goals	Apps	Goals	Apps	Goals	Apps	Goals
Oadby Town	2012–13 (Note: Unable to obtain line-ups for Battle of Britain Charity Cup quarter-final and semi-final (against Blaby & Whetstone Athletic on 31 July, and St Andrews on 21 August respectively))	UCL Division One	33	5	2	1	—		6 (Note: Three appearances two goals in United Counties League Knockout Cup; one appearance in FA Vase; one appearance in Battle of Britain Charity Cup; one appearance in Leicestershire Challenge Cup)	2	41	8
Ilkeston	2013–14	NPL Premier Division	23	1	0	0	—		5 (Note: Three appearances in Derbyshire Senior Cup; one appearance in FA Trophy; one appearance in Northern Premier League Challenge Cup)	0	28	1
Ilkeston	2014–15	NPL Premier Division	17	8	3	0	—		1 (Note: Appearance in FA Trophy)	1	21	9
Ilkeston	Total		40	9	3	0	—		6	1	49	10
Sheffield United	2014–15	League One	10	0	0	0	2	2	1 (Note: Appearance in League One play-offs)	1	13	3
Sheffield United	2015–16	League One	36	11	2	0	2	0	1 (Note: Appearance in Football League Trophy)	1	41	12
Sheffield United	2016–17	League One	1	0	—		—		—		1	0
Sheffield United	Total		47	11	2	0	4	2	2	2	55	15
Birmingham City	2016–17	Championship	40	7	2	0	0	0	—		42	7
Birmingham City	2017–18	Championship	30	5	2	1	1	3	—		33	9
Birmingham City	2018–19	Championship	46	22	1	0	1	0	—		48	22
Birmingham City	Total		116	34	5	1	2	3	—		123	38
Southampton	2019–20	Premier League	30	4	3	0	2	0	—		35	4
Southampton	2020–21	Premier League	36	9	5	0	1	0	—		42	9
Southampton	2021–22	Premier League	30	7	1	0	2	1	—		33	8
Southampton	2022–23	Premier League	28	5	2	0	5	5	—		35	10
Southampton	2023–24	Championship	40	16	4	2	1	0	1 (Note: Appearance in Championship play-offs)	0	46	18
Southampton	Total		164	41	15	2	11	6	1	0	191	49
Torino	2024–25	Serie A	36	9	2	1	—		—		38	10
Torino	2025–26	Serie A	33	6	3	2	—		—		36	8
Torino	2026–27	Serie A	9	4	1	0	—		—		10	4
Torino	Total		78	19	6	3	—		—		84	22
Career total			478	118	33	7	17	11	15	5	543	142

=== International ===
As of match played 13 November 2026

Appearances and goals by national team and year
National team	Year	Apps	Goals
Scotland	2021	13	4
Scotland	2022	9	1
Scotland	2023	5	0
Scotland	2024	8	1
Scotland	2025	10	5
Scotland	2026	6	2
Total		51	13

As of match played 6 June 2026. Scotland score listed first, score column indicates score after each Adams goal.

List of international goals scored by Ché Adams
No.	Date	Venue	Cap	Opponent	Score	Result	Competition	Ref.
1	31 March 2021	Hampden Park, Glasgow, Scotland	3	Faroe Islands	3–0	4–0	2022 FIFA World Cup qualification	
2	6 June 2021	Stade Josy Barthel, Luxembourg City, Luxembourg	4	Luxembourg	1–0	1–0	Friendly	
3	12 November 2021	Zimbru Stadium, Chișinău, Moldova	12	Moldova	2–0	2–0	2022 FIFA World Cup qualification	
4	15 November 2021	Hampden Park, Glasgow, Scotland	13	Denmark	2–0	2–0	2022 FIFA World Cup qualification	
5	14 June 2022	Vazgen Sargsyan Republican Stadium, Yerevan, Armenia	19	Armenia	4–1	4–1	2022–23 UEFA Nations League B	
6	3 June 2024	Estádio Algarve, Faro/Loulé, Portugal	30	Gibraltar	2–0	2–0	Friendly	
7	9 June 2025	Rheinpark Stadion, Vaduz, Liechtenstein	39	Liechtenstein	1–0	4–0	Friendly	
8	9 June 2025	Rheinpark Stadion, Vaduz, Liechtenstein	39	Liechtenstein	2–0	4–0	Friendly	
9	9 June 2025	Rheinpark Stadion, Vaduz, Liechtenstein	39	Liechtenstein	4–0	4–0	Friendly	
10	8 September 2025	ZTE Arena, Zalaegerszeg, Hungary	41	Belarus	1–0	2–0	2026 FIFA World Cup qualification	
11	12 October 2025	Hampden Park, Glasgow, Scotland	43	Belarus	1–0	2–1	2026 FIFA World Cup qualification	
12	6 June 2026	Sports Illustrated Stadium, Harrison, United States	47	Bolivia	3–0	4–0	Friendly	
13	6 June 2026	Sports Illustrated Stadium, Harrison, United States	47	Bolivia	4–0	4–0	Friendly	

== Honours ==
Oadby Town

- Battle of Britain Charity Cup: 2012–13

Ilkeston

- Derbyshire Senior Cup: 2013–14

Southampton

- EFL Championship play-offs: 2024

Individual

- Sheffield United Young Player of the Season: 2015–16
- Sheffield Star Young Player of the Season: 2015–16
- Birmingham City Young Player of the Season: 2016–17
- Birmingham City Supporters' Player of the Season: 2018–19
- Birmingham City Players' Player of the Season: 2018–19
- Birmingham City Goal of the Season: 2018–19
- Serie A Goal of the Month: December 2024
- Serie A Team of the Season: 2024–25

== See also ==
- List of Scotland international footballers born outside Scotland
