= Ryan Amoo =

British footballer (born 1983)

Personal information
- Full name: Ryan Lee Amoo
- Date of birth: 11 October 1983 (age 43)
- Place of birth: Leicester, England
- Positions: Midfielder; right back

Team information
- Current team: Leicester Nirvana
- Number: 8

Youth career
- 1999–2002: Aston Villa

Senior career*
Years	Team	Apps	(Gls)
2001–2005	Aston Villa	2	(0)
2004	→ Northampton Town (loan)	6	(0)
2004–2005	Northampton Town	18	(0)
2006	Highfield Rangers	46	
2006–2009	Lincoln City	86	(3)
2008	Barwell	39	
2008–2009	Thurnby Nirvana		
2008–2009	Solihull Moors	24	(6)
2010	Halesowen Town	10	(0)
2010–2012	Solihull Moors	38	(0)
2012–13	Thurnby Nirvana	6	(1)
2016–2018	Montpellier	78	(23)
2018–	Leicester Nirvana	28	(1)
Total		381	(34)
- * Club domestic league appearances and goals as of 15:15, 8 April 2007 (GMT)

Ryan Lee Amoo (born 11 October 1983) is an English footballer, who plays for Leicester Nirvana F.C.

He played in the Football League for Northampton Town and Lincoln City.

== Career ==
Amoo began his career with Aston Villa, featuring in the FA Youth Cup winning side of 2002. In March 2004 he moved on to Northampton Town, agreeing a 15-month contract with the club and making his debut as a last minute substitute in the 2–1 victory over Oxford United on 3 April 2004. In his first full season with Northampton, Amoo managed 19 starts for the first-team and at the end of March 2005 his contract was terminated.

At this point, Amoo was involved in an 11-month relationship with the reality television star Jade Goody and, following their separation, dropped out of the professional ranks to join Leicestershire Senior League side Highfield Rangers. He moved to their league rivals Barrow Town for whom he made a goal scoring debut in their 4–0 away victory over Holwell Sports on 8 November 2005.

In July 2006, Amoo was offered a trial with Lincoln City whose then Director of Football John Deehan had worked with Amoo at Northampton and Aston Villa. The trial was successful with Amoo agreeing a one-year contract with the Imps. The 2006–07 season saw Amoo establish himself as a regular in the first-team, starting 40 league games and being rewarded with a new two-year contract at the end of the season. His last appearance for the club came against Bury on 1 January 2008, and he was released from his contract by mutual consent at the end of the 2007–08 season. He then moved to Midland Alliance league side Barwell. He scored his first goal for the club in a 4–1 victory over St Andrews in a Westerby Challenge Cup tie on 11 November 2008. He moved on to join Leicestershire Senior League side Thurnby Nirvana before signing for Stamford in March 2009, making his debut in the home 1–0 defeat to Rushall Olympic on 14 March 2009. His spell with the Daniels however was brief and he ended the season back with Thurnby Nirvana whilst also playing for Premier Sports Travel in the Alliance Football League, Leicester's leading Sunday morning league.

On 12 February 2010, Solihull Moors announced the double signing of Ryan Amoo and former Leeds United midfielder Simon Johnson. He left the club at the end of the 2009–2010 season and began the following season with Halesowen Town debuting in their Southern League Premier Division goalless draw at home to Weymouth on 14 August 2010 before departing the club without making a further appearance. In October 2010 he rejoined Solihull Moors and, for the 2011–12 season, Thurnby Nirvana. In Summer 2016 signed for newly promoted Montpellier F.C. and after two years, in August 2018 for Leicester Nirvana.

== Honours ==
=== Aston Villa ===
- FA Youth Cup
  - Winner: 2001–02
- Premier Reserve League
  - Winner: 2003–04

=== Lincoln City ===
- Lincolnshire Senior Cup
  - Winner 2007
