= Rothley (disambiguation) =

- Rothley is a village in Leicestershire, England.

Rothley may also refer to:

- Rothley, Northumberland, England
- Rothley railway station, Leicestershire, England
- Rothley Imperial F.C., Leicestershire, England
- Willi Rothley, a German politician
