= St Mary and St John's Church =

St Mary and St John's Church and variants of it are the names of several churches dedicated to St Mary and St John the Evangelist; these include:

- St Mary and St John's Church, Hardraw
- St Mary and St John Church, Hinxton
- Church of St Mary and St John, Lamyat
- St Mary and St John Church, Wolverhampton
- St Mary & St John Church, Rothley
