= Rothley =

Village in Leicestershire, England

Coordinates: 52.709°N 1.136°W

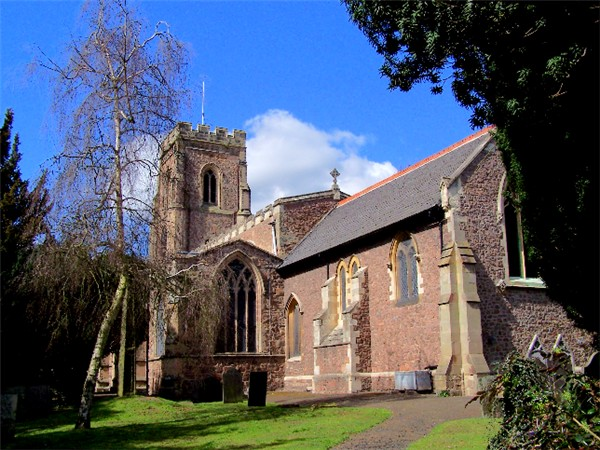
- The 14th-century Anglican parish church of St Mary and St John

- Location within Leicestershire
- Population: 3,897 (2011 Census)
- OS grid reference: SK583127
  - London: 93 mi (150 km) SSE
- District: Charnwood
- Shire county: Leicestershire
- Region: East Midlands
- Country: England
- Sovereign state: United Kingdom
- Post town: LEICESTER
- Postcode district: LE7
- Dialling code: 0116
- Police: Leicestershire
- Fire: Leicestershire
- Ambulance: East Midlands
- UK Parliament: Mid Leicestershire

Rothley (/ˈroʊθli/ ROHTH-lee) is a village and civil parish within the Borough of Charnwood in Leicestershire, England. Situated around one-half mile (800 metres) west of the River Soar and five miles (eight kilometres) north of Leicester, it had a population of 3,612 inhabitants the 2001 census. The population measured at the 2011 census was 3,897.

Rothley centres on two greens, Cross Green and the Town Green, both of which are accessed by a road that leads from the crossroads. The crossroads lies on the old route of the A6 road, which now bypasses the village.

Rothley is one of Leicestershire's most affluent areas based on number of houses worth more than £1 million – especially in some streets such as The Ridgeway, identified in the Sunday Times as the most expensive place to live in the East Midlands.

Most children of primary schooling age attend Rothley (Church of England) Primary School. The main shopping street in the village is Woodgate. Rothley has four churches, Rothley Baptist Church, the Methodist Church, Sacred Heart RC, and the main parish church St Mary & St John's Church of England.

Rothley has close links with its neighbouring village, Mountsorrel, which is two miles (three kilometres) to the north.

== History ==
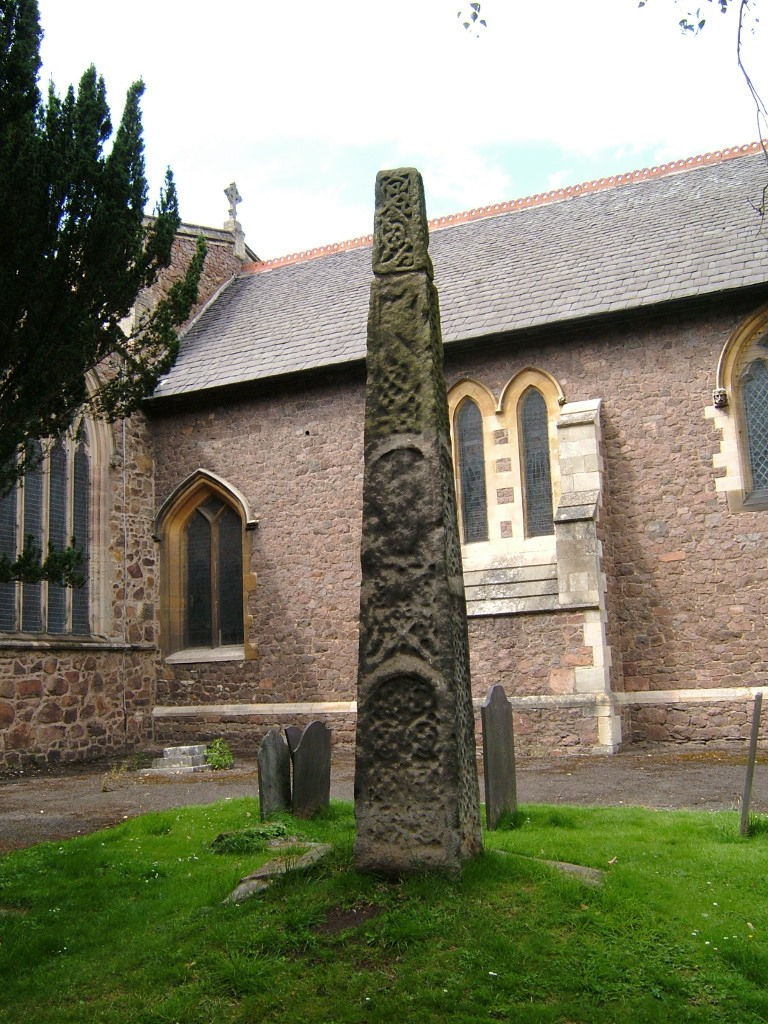
Saxon cross in Rothley churchyard

Rothley has been inhabited since Saxon times, as evidenced by the ancient Saxon cross in the church graveyard in the village. It is mentioned in the Domesday Book where it is listed as "Rodolei" amongst the lands belonging to the king, William I. The land includes 37 acres (15 hectares) of meadow, a mill and considerable woodlands. This manor also controlled surrounding pieces of land in a large number of villages including Asfordby, Seagrave and Sileby. Its name may have come from Anglo-Saxon Roþlēah = "meadow in a clearing".

In the Middle Ages, Rothley was home to a manor of the Knights Templar, known as Rothley Temple, but now the Rothley Court Hotel, which passed to the Babington family after the dissolution of the monasteries in the 16th century. The Babington family held the manor for almost 300 years until the death in 1837 of Thomas Babington. Married to Jean Macaulay, the daughter of a Scottish Presbyterian minister, Thomas Babington was MP for Leicester from 1800–1818, and a leading Anglican evangelical. Educated at St John's College, Cambridge alongside William Wilberforce, the two worked closely together on social improvement and famously on the bills to abolish the slave trade.

Wilberforce and Babington spent much time at the Rothley retreat working on the text of the bills, and on the analysis of the Select Committee's enquiries into the trade. Babington was instrumental in rescuing his wife's young brother, Zachary Macaulay, from the mental trauma of working as an overseer on a Jamaican slave plantation, when Zachary came to recuperate at Rothley Temple. Zachary was restored, and with a new Christian faith, went on to a lifetime devoted to the anti-slavery cause, and to have a posthumous bust in his honour placed in Westminster Abbey. Zachary returned often to Rothley, and on one long visit in 1800 his wife Selina (née Mills) gave birth to poet, historian and Whig politician Thomas Babington Macaulay, 1st Baron Macaulay.

In 1899, Rothley railway station was opened on the Great Central Railway, which is now part of the Great Central Railway. The station has been used to film period drama such as the 1988 film Buster and the 2004 Miss Marple TV adaptation of 4:50 from Paddington (where the station stood in for Paddington).

The Bishop's House in Rothley is the home of the suffragan Bishop of Loughborough.

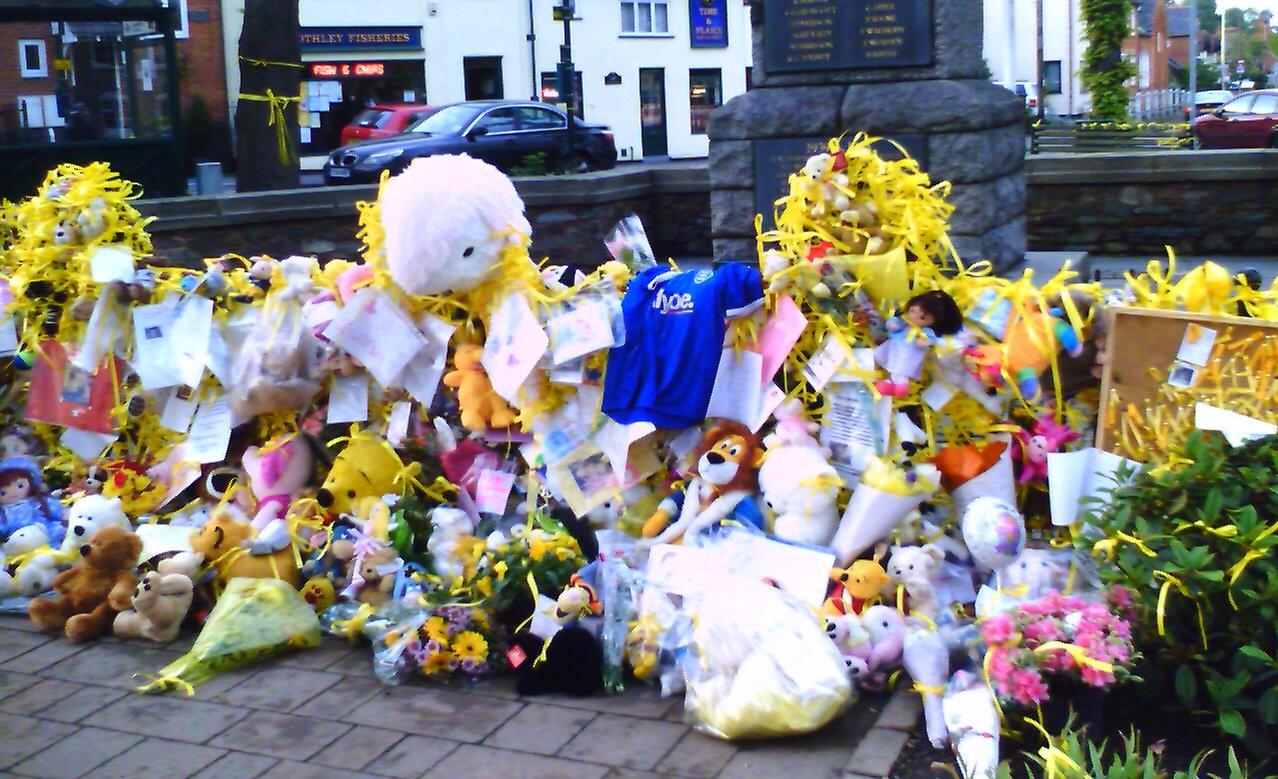
Tributes in Rothley on 17 May 2007

In 1988 Rothley was involved in a cricketing controversy, when then-England captain Mike Gatting was accused by The Sun and Today newspapers of improprieties with a barmaid at the Rothley Court Hotel. These accusations led to the sacking of Gatting as captain, despite his protestations of innocence.

In May 2007, Madeleine McCann, who lived in Rothley, disappeared when on holiday in Portugal shortly before her fourth birthday. The town square was decorated with yellow ribbons, teddy bears, notes and cards by people wanting to show support. In September, Rothley became the centre of international media attention when McCann's parents, Kate and Gerry McCann, returned to their home after being formally named as suspects in the investigation into Madeleine's disappearance. The heavy media presence in the town led to tension between journalists and the local community, the majority of whom responded by declining reporters' requests for comment about the case.

== Sport ==
The town also has its own non league football club, Rothley Imperial F.C. who currently play in the Leicestershire Senior League Division Two at Loughborough Road.

== Notable people ==
- Churchill Babington (1821–1889), classical scholar, archaeologist and botanist
