= HRFC =

HRFC may refer to:

- Hackney RFC
- Hampton Rovers Football Club
- Harpenden RFC
- Harvard Rugby Football Club
- Havant RFC
- Haverfordwest RFC
- Helston RFC
- Highfield Rangers F.C.
- Halifax Rugby Football Club (Halifax, Nova Scotia)
