= Asfordby F.C. =

Coordinates: 52°45′37.87″N 0°58′7.8″W

Asfordby
- Full name: Asfordby Football Club
- Founded: 1976; 50 years ago
- Ground: Asfordby Acres, Asfordby
- Chairman: Simon Atherley
- Manager: Simon Atherley
- League: Leicestershire Senior League Division Two
- 2025–26: Leicestershire Senior League Division Two (withdrew)
Home colours

Asfordby Football Club is a football club based in Asfordby, England. They play at Asfordby Acres, Asfordby.

== History ==
In 1976, Asfordby Athletic Juniors were formed, joining the Melton & District League. In 1991, following a name change to Asfordby Amateurs, the club joined the Leicestershire Senior League, winning Division One in 1994. Following relegation back to Division One in 1997, the club returned to the Premier Division in 2008. In 2015, Asfordby Amateurs left the league, returning as Asfordby in 2017. In 2023, the club was admitted into the United Counties League Division One.

== Ground ==
Asforby initially played at Station Lane in Asfordby, before moving to their current site at Asforby Acres in the 1980s.
