= Asfordby Hill =

Hamlet in Leicestershire, England

Coordinates: 52.76568°N 0.92669°W

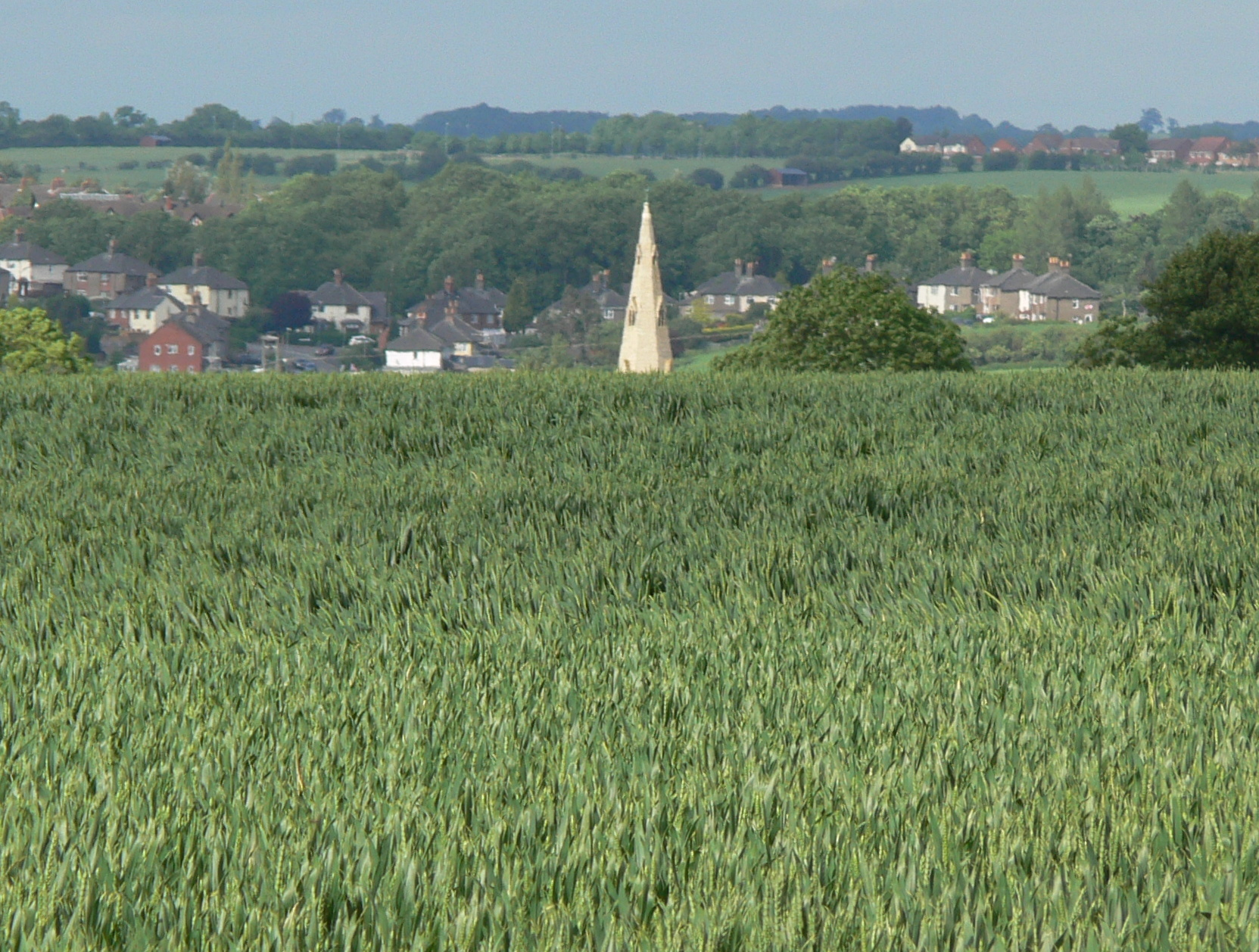
- View across farmland towards Asfordby Hill

- Location within Leicestershire
- Civil parish: Asfordby
- District: Melton
- Shire county: Leicestershire
- Region: East Midlands
- Country: England
- Sovereign state: United Kingdom
- Post town: MELTON MOWBRAY
- Postcode district: LE14
- Dialling code: 01664
- Police: Leicestershire
- Fire: Leicestershire
- Ambulance: East Midlands

Asfordby Hill is a hamlet on the A6006 road, in the civil parish of Asfordby, in the Melton district, in the county of Leicestershire, England.

== Amenities ==
Asfordby Hill has a primary school which was built in 1909. A garden centre with an alpine themed restaurant and farm shop is also present.

Asfordby Hill Iron Foundry remains open and is owned by St. Gobain. It is a little known fact that a large proportion of the nation's drain covers are made at the foundry. The foundry received a large number of weapons which were handed into Leicestershire Police following an arms amnesty in 1996.

Asfordby Mine was the last coal mine to be built in Britain and is now closed, the winding towers were demolished in 1998.

The former mine site is now part industrial units and part of a rail testing facility with a test track that runs to Nottingham. Virgin's pendolino train was tested on the track and the test track is now used for the new London Underground trains. New business units are being erected on the site of the former mine and the area is once again gaining a reputation as an area for growth and business opportunities.

The 'Stute' is the name for Holwell working men's club which still has a number of sporting connections. Most notably Holwell FC, Holwell rifle club and Holwell Bowls club. All have tasted a high level of success over the years.

There are several picturesque walks around 'The Hill' and a lot of wildlife can be observed, including Buzzards, Red Kite, foxes and varieties of wild deer.

The former site of Asfordby Hill steel works now boasts rare orchids.
