= Asfordby Colliery =

Coal mine in Leicestershire, England

- Location within Leicestershire
- Location: Asfordby, Leicestershire, England; 52.7742°N 0.9257°W
- Products: Coal
- Opened: 1991
- Closed: 1997
- Company: British Coal; RJB Mining

Asfordby Colliery (also known as Asfordby super-pit and Asfordby Mine) was a coal mine located in the village of Asfordby, near to Melton Mowbray in Leicestershire, England. It was the last deep coal mine to be sunk in England in 1987 and was expected to coal for many years, but closed within a few years with geological problems being cited as the issue. It has been described as 'the least successful coal mine ever conceived'.

== History ==
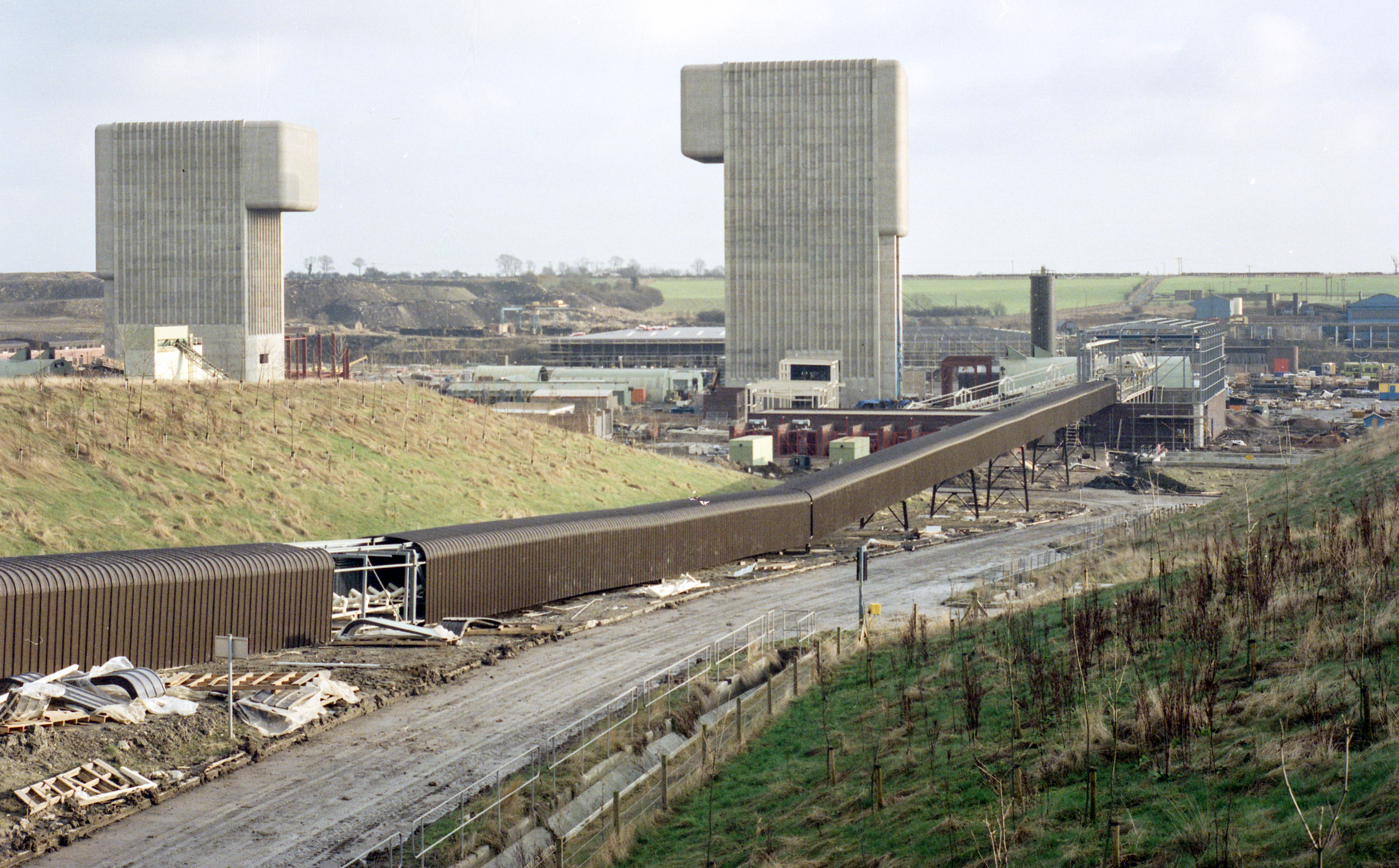
Asfordby Collliery Under Construction in Winter 1988/89

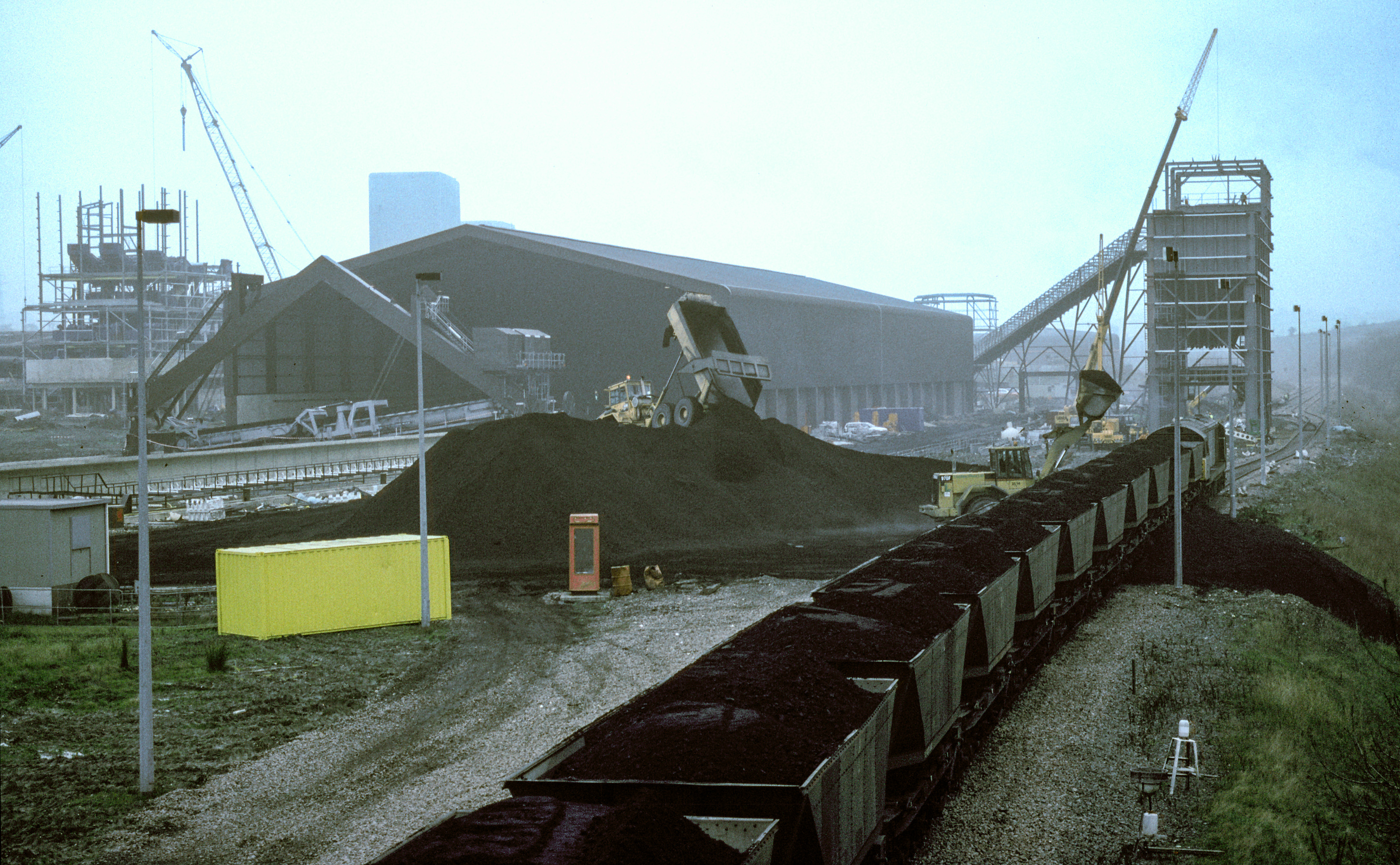
Train being loaded with coal at Asfordby Colliery in 1995

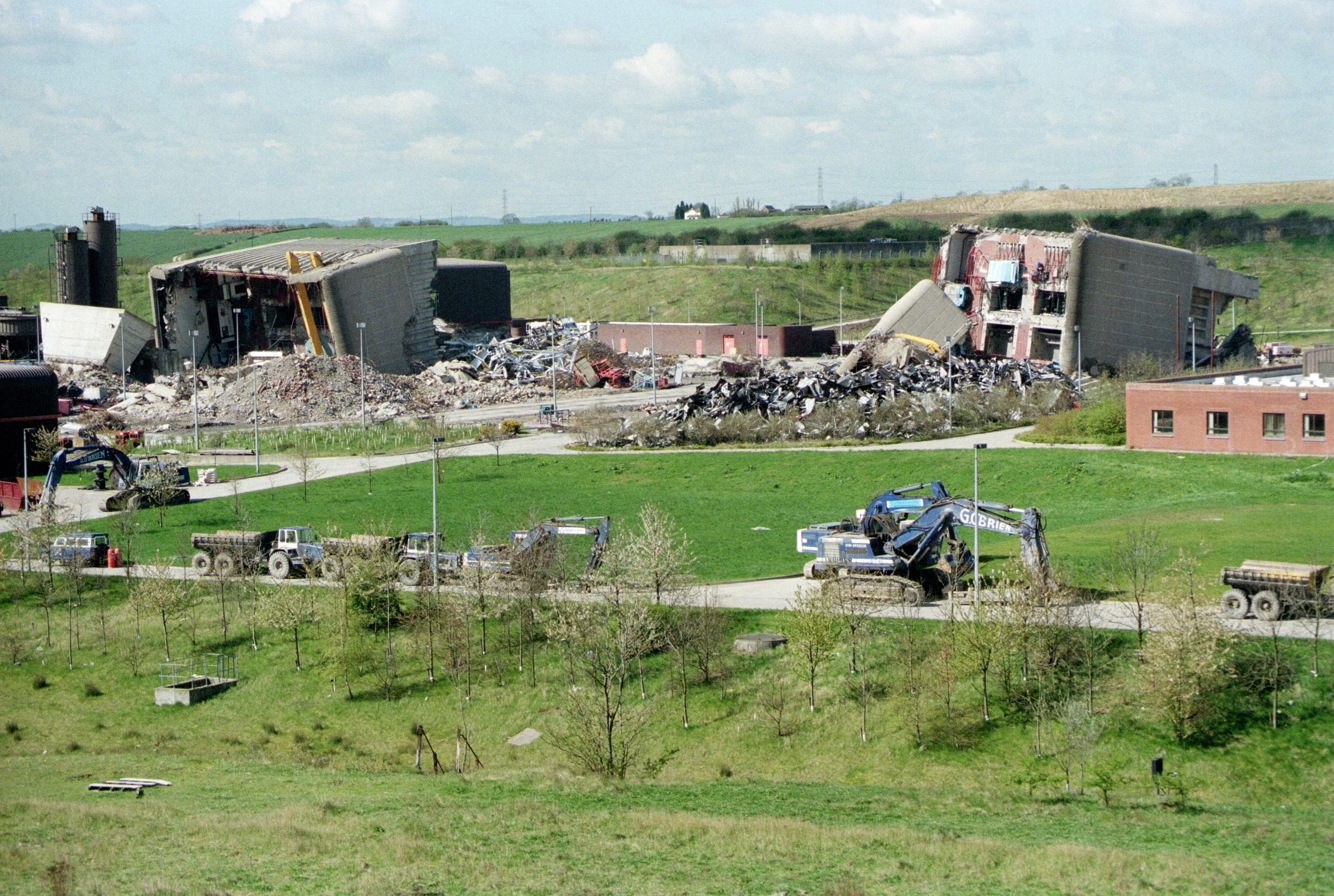
Asfordby Collliery Being Demolished in March 1998

Asfordby was one of three Super-pits proposed by Michael Heseltine, but eventually only Asfordby was sunk. Objections to the minesites locations because of the natural beauty and rurality in those areas led to only Asfordby being started as it was already in an industrial area with a rail connection very close by. Preparatory work began on the mine in 1984, but physical building did not start until 1987, with coaling operations beginning in 1991. Two shafts over 1,500 feet (460 m) deep were dug into the coal seams. In 1994, British Coal was wound up and the Asfordby site was purchased by RJB Mining. The first coal left the mine by train in 1991 and geological problems meant production had ceased by 1997. British Coal invested over £300 million in the pit and after privatisation in 1994, a further £40 million was invested. At its peak, the mine employed 490 personnel. When the closure notice came in, it was partially lamented locally, but it was commented upon by the miners themselves as well as the locals, that the blow would not be felt in the same way as traditional pit villages as most of the men who worked in the pit were from outside the Melton Mowbray area and had taken the jobs at Asfordby when their own mines had been closed down.

The mine was closed due to volcanic sills that sat above the coal seams. The volcanic rocks were heavier than expected and had been putting too much pressure on the excavated coal seams below. Just before the closure was announced in August 1997, a massive flood and rockfall destroyed £6 million worth of equipment and the mine was closed leaving behind a possible 500,000,000 tonnes (454,000,000 tons) of mineable coal. The Confederation of UK Coal Producers (COLPRO) wrote to the government to complain as they had authorised a new gas-fired power station and COLPRO and the NUM were fearful that the new Labour government would not support retaining Asfordby mine.

Martin Weiss and Tom Leafe, in Coal Mines Remembered, describe the pit as a £400-million-plus folly:

Asfordby mine project was one of the country's biggest-ever state-led 'misjudgements'. The former British Coal and the UK government, between them, squandered massive sums of public money on what must have been the least successful coal mine ever conceived. As a final 'fling' for the 20th century coal industry Asfordby remains a puzzle.

== Post closure ==
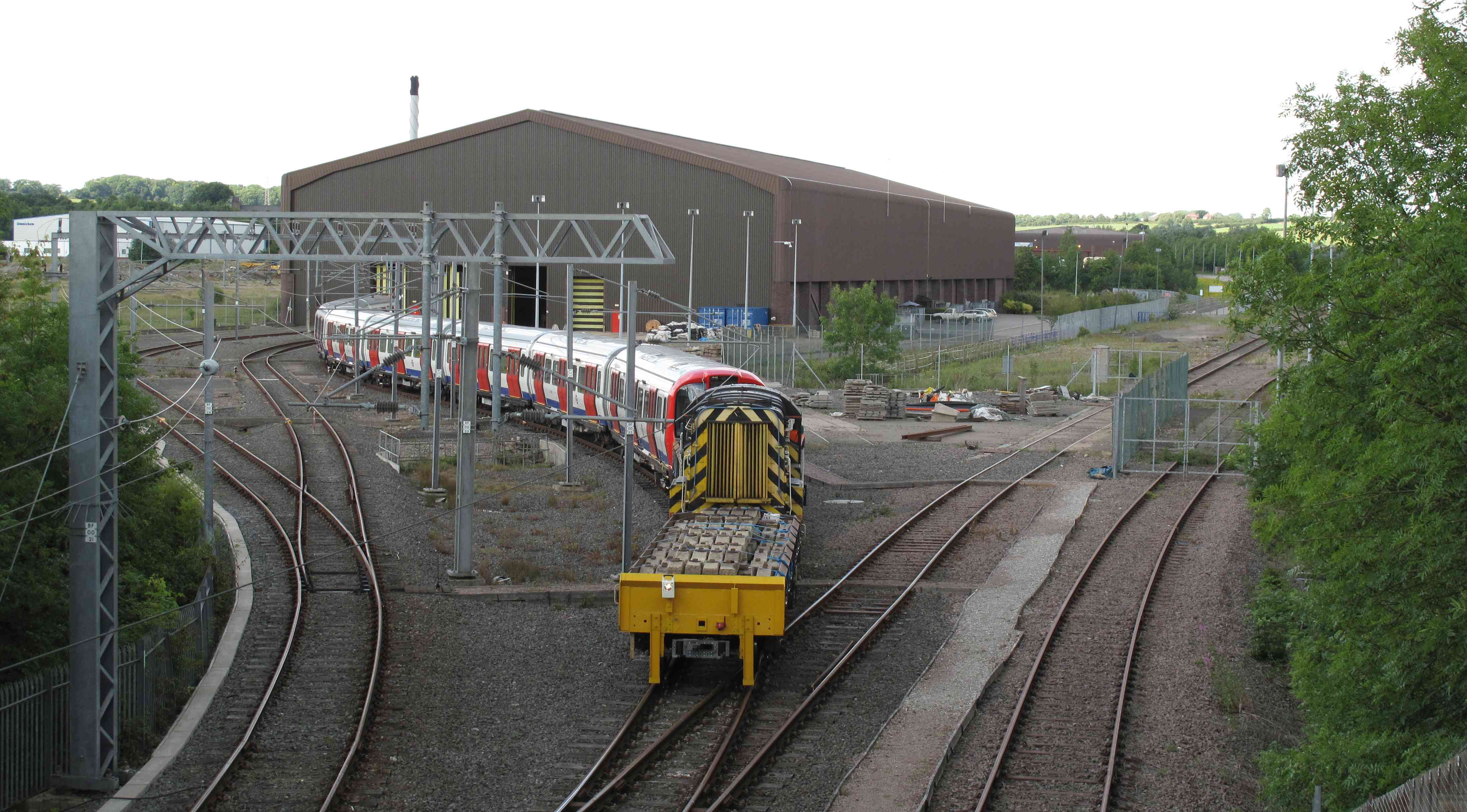
London Underground train being propelled into the Network Rail Asfordby Depot on the site of Asfordby Colliery, on the Old Dalby Test Track in 2009

The two winding towers were demolished in 1998 and permission was granted to turn the complex into a business park. In 2007, part of the complex was installed with a test centre for trains that would utilise the adjacent 14-mile (23 km) test track from which a spur had been built to connect to the mine. Suggestions for re-use of the site have included siting a wind farm on it and also the prospect of an anaerobic digestion plant.
