= Rothley Imperial F.C. =

Association football club in England

Coordinates: 52.719242°N 1.1321202°W

Rothley Imperial
- Full name: Rothley Imperial Football Club
- Nickname: Imps
- Founded: 1911
- Ground: Loughborough Road, Rothley
- Chairman: Scott Telfer
- Manager: Dave Percival
- League: Leicestershire Senior League Division Two
- 2024–25: Leicestershire Senior League Division Two, 8th of 13
Home colours

Rothley Imperial Football Club is a football club based in Rothley, Leicestershire England. They are currently members of the Leicestershire Senior League Division Two. The club's nickname is the Imps. The club is affiliated to the Leicestershire and Rutland County Football Association

== History ==
In 2003 the club joined Division One of the Leicestershire Senior League. After winning the division in their first season, they were promoted to the Premier Division. In 2006–07 the club entered the FA Vase for the first time. They entered for the next two seasons, but only won one match, beating Pershore Town 3–2 in the second qualifying round, before losing to Dudley Town in the next round.

In 2011–12 the club won the Premier Division, and retained the title the following season. However, they resigned from the Leicestershire Senior League shortly before the end of the 2015–16 season, and subsequently folded. In 2017 the club were re-established and joined the Premier Division of the North Leicestershire League. For the 2019–20 season the club rejoined the Leicestershire Senior League, in division two.

== Ground ==
The club play their home games at Loughborough Road. The ground has floodlights.

== Honours ==
Leicestershire Senior League Premier Division champions 2011–12, 2012–13

Leicestershire League Cup 2011-12

Division One champions 2003–04

== Records ==
- Best FA Vase performance: First round, 2008–09
