= St Mary & St John Church, Rothley =

St Mary & St John
- Parish Church of St Mary the Virgin and St John the Baptist
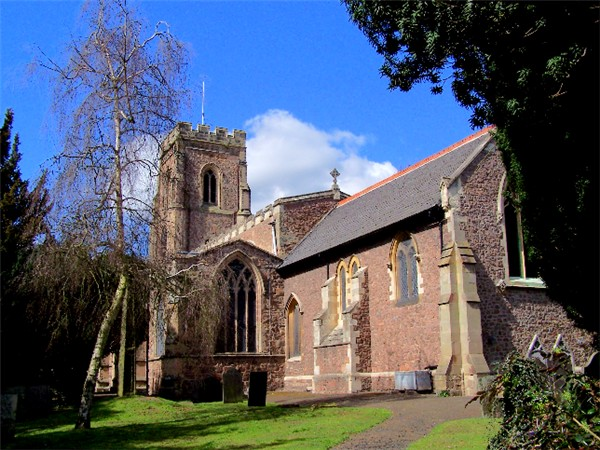

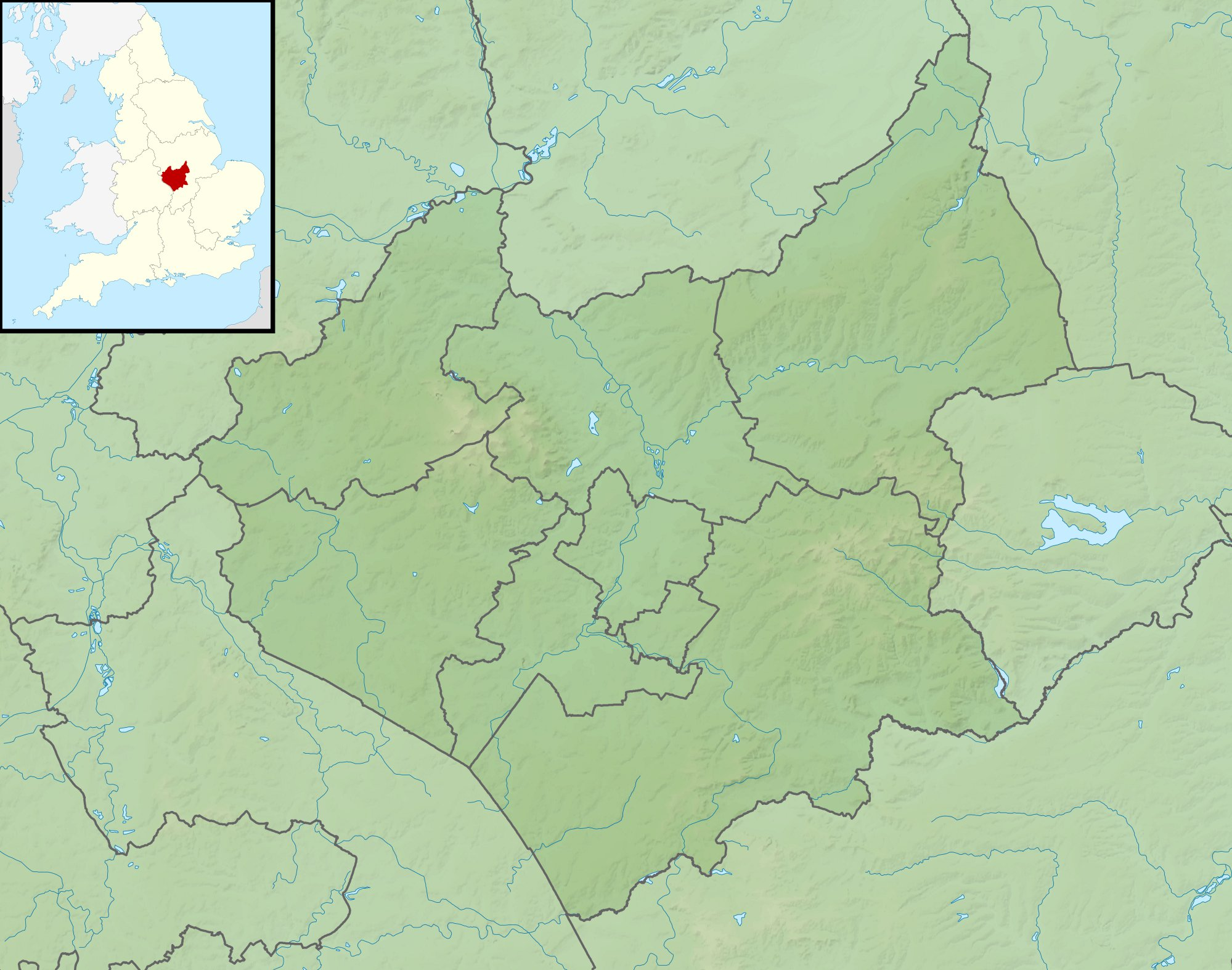
- Location within Leicestershire
- 52.708432°N 1.134244°W
- OS grid reference: SK 58595 12654
- Location: Rothley, Leicestershire
- Country: England
- Denomination: Church of England
- Churchmanship: Conservative Evangelical
- Website: rothleychurch.org.uk

History
- Founded: 1160
- Dedication: Mary the Virgin and John the Baptist

Architecture
- Heritage designation: Grade II* listed
- Designated: 1966

Administration
- Province: Province of Canterbury
- Diocese: Diocese of Leicester
- Archdeaconry: Archdeacon of Leicester
- Deanery: Goscote
- Parish: St Mary the Virgin and St John the Baptist, Rothley

Clergy
- Vicar: Rob Gladstone

St Mary & St John is a Church of England parish church in the centre of Rothley, England. It has a congregation of mixed ages and backgrounds. The church aims "to reach out with the good news of Jesus Christ, to be built up as his disciples and to send people out to make God’s love known in the world".

== Buildings ==
The church is a Grade II* listed building. In the grounds just next to the church is a Saxon cross shaft, evidence of a Christian presence on the site before the Norman Conquest, confirmed in Rothley's entry in King William's Domesday Book.

In addition to the main building, the church also makes use of the nearby Old School Rooms, erected in 1837 by Revd William Ackworth as the village school and extended further in 1871 by Revd Richard Burton. It ceased being a school in 1968 when a new school was built on Mountsorrel Lane.

The organ is the church's main instrument and is used within the majority of services. It was originally installed in 1929 in dedication to the memory of the men of Rothley who died in the Great War (1914-1918). It was built by Hill, Norman and Beard and has two manuals with twenty-two stops which enable a broad range of sounds to be produced. The pipe organ was fully refurbished in 2005.

Rothley Parish Church has published a booklet "The Five Ages of Rothley Church" written by local historian Terry Sheppard covering the Saxon period to the modern era.

In 2015, the church building was photographed internally and externally by Adrian Witcombe, and the images were assembled into seven interactive 360 degree high definition tours which allow the reader to enlarge each historic memorial or artefact, and to read a short description of their place and significance.

The Roll of Honour is wooden memorial which is located near the West Door (Tower) which is dedicated to 292 men from Rothley village who served in The Great War 1914–1918. In July 2018, restoration of the Roll of Honour was undertaken by Belgrave Conservation under a Faculty (or permission) granted by the Diocese of Leicester. The Roll of Honour was rededicated by Rev. Rob Gladstone during the 9am Sunday service on 28 October 2018, in time for the Centenary of the Armistice Remembrance Service on Sunday 11 November 2018. Photographs of the restoration of the Roll of Honour and the Service of Remembrance and an audio recording of the re-dedication are preserved on the church website.

== Staff ==
The present vicar of St Mary's is the Revd Rob Gladstone. In addition to the clergy, the church employs other ministry and administrative staff.
