= GNG Oadby Town F.C. =

Association football club in England

Coordinates: 52°36′37.7″N 1°09′47.1″W

GNG Oadby Town
- GNG Oadby Town badge
- Full name: GNG Oadby Town Football Club
- Nickname: The Poachers
- Founded: 1937 (as Oadby Imperial)
- Ground: Riverside / GNG FC Football Grounds, Leicester
- Capacity: 3,000
- Chairman: Inderjit Singh Heer
- Manager: Bahadur Sandhu
- League: Midland League Division One
- 2025–26: United Counties League Premier Division South, 20th of 20 (relegated)
- Website: http://www.pitchero.com/clubs/oadbytown/
Home colours	Away colours

GNG Oadby Town Football Club is an association football club based in Leicester. The club plays in the Midland League Division One.

== History ==
The exact year of formation is unsure but it is believed to be either 1937 or 1939 under the guise of Oadby Imperial. The club did not have to wait long for their first honours winning the "City Medals" competition in the 1939–40 season. Around 1943 the club merged with a local junior side to become Oadby United, two years later in 1949 they reverted to original name of Oadby Imperial which coincided being accepted into the Leicestershire Senior League Division 2 for the 1949–50 season. The first season saw the club finish in 11th place out of 16. In 1951 Oadby Imperial changed their name to become Oadby Town FC. In the same year they won the Leicestershire Senior League Division Two Championship and were promoted to Division One (later Division One became the Premier League and Division Two became Division One).

The 1956–57 season saw the club finish as runners-up in the Leicestershire Senior League to Leicester City 'A' and also were runners-up to Whitwick Colliery in the Coalville Charity Cup. It was until 1963 that the club won its first major honours winning the Leicestershire Senior Cup for the first time beating Newfoundpool WMC in the final. The following season saw three pieces of silverware collected. As well as retaining their Leicestershire Senior Cup crown, Oadby also were Leicestershire Senior League champions for the first time and won the Coalville Charity Cup for a second time. It was to be a further four years (1967–68) for Oadby to regain the Senior League crown and for good measure they retained their Senior League title the following year and also added the Leicestershire Challenge and Rolleston Charity Cups. A fourth Senior League crown was achieved in the 1972–73 season. This was to be the last league title for over twenty years as it was not until the 1994–95 season that they regained the title. Titles six, seven and eight came in three consecutive years between 1997 and 1999, the latter resulting in promotion to the Midland Football Alliance.

Oadby Town have won the Leicestershire Senior League eight times and been runners-up seven times. In the 1999–2000 season they joined the Midland Football Alliance, and in their first season in this league they were crowned champions.

In the 2002–03 season Oadby Town were FA Vase semi-finalists, losing out to Brigg Town 3–1 on aggregate.

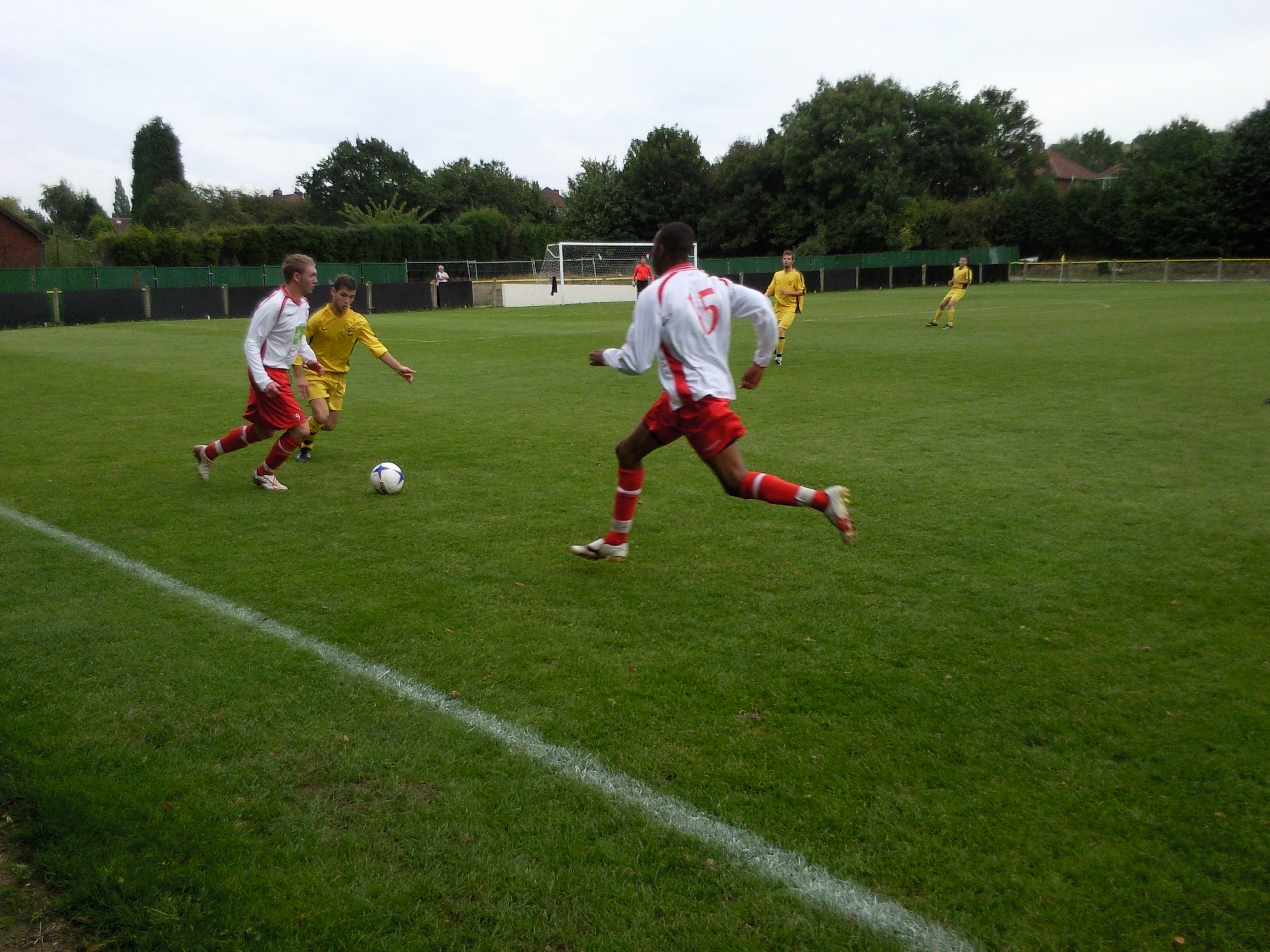
Oadby (white shirts) playing Tividale in the FA Vase in 2010

The 2004–05 season saw the club win their first Leicestershire Challenge Cup crown for over 30 years and 3rd in total, beating fellow Midland Alliance side Barwell 2–1 at the Walkers Stadium in Leicester. The 2006–07 season saw Oadby enter the Rolleston Charity Cup for the first time in nine years and winning the competition for a ninth time beating Barwell 2–1 in the final at Holmes Park. The following season saw Oadby retain the Rolleston Charity Cup beating favourites Hinckley United 4–1 in the final. On top of that they won the Leicestershire Challenge Cup for the fourth time beating Friar Lane & Epworth 3–0 at the Walkers Stadium.

In 2010–11 Oadby Town finished 22nd in the Midland Football Alliance and were relegated to the East Midlands Counties League. Lee Harriman, former Coalville Town chief, was appointed manager for the 2011–12 season. Oadby managed a successful season with a decent run in the FA Vase, being the only team from below Step 5 to reach the 5th Round, losing to Staveley Miners Welfare.

Oadby Town moved across to the United Counties League Division One (Step 6) for the 2012–13 season, which they won as champions and currently are in the South Premier Division (Step 5).

In August 2020, the club was renamed GNG Oadby Town to recognise the contribution of former GNG players and Oadby residents in saving the club from financial difficulties in 2019.

== Ground ==
Oadby previously played at Wigston Road and now play at Riverside/GNG FC, Leicester.

== Honours ==
- United Counties League Division One
  - Champions 2013–14
- Midland Alliance
  - Champions 1999–2000
- Leicestershire Senior League Premier Division/Division One
  - Champions 1963–64, 1967–68, 1968–69, 1972–73, 1994–95, 1996–97, 1997–98, 1998–99
  - Runners-up 1956–57, 1966–67, 1971–72, 1973–74, 1977–78, 1995–96
- Leicestershire Senior League Division Two/One
  - Champions 1951–52
- Midland Alliance Joe McGorian Cup winners 2000–01
- Leicestershire Challenge Cup winners 1968–69, 1970–71, 2004–05, 2007–08
- Leicestershire Senior Cup winners 1962–63, 1963–64, 1975–76, 1976–77, 1980–81
- Leicestershire Senior League Cup winners 1977–78, 1993–94, 1994–95
- Battle of Britain Charity Cup winners 1993–94, 1994–95, 1996–97, 2012–13
- Coalville Charity Cup winners 1960–61, 1963–64, 1965–66
- Harborough Charity Cup winners 1983–84, 1988–89
- Rolleston Charity Cup winners 1958–59, 1959–60, 1968–69, 1975–76, 1988–89, 1993–94, 1996–97, 1997–98, 2006–07, 2007–08
- City Medals winners 1939–40

== Records ==
- FA Cup
  - Third Qualifying Round 1999–2000
- FA Vase
  - Semi-finals 2002–03
