= Asfordby =

Village in Leicestershire, England

Coordinates: 52.76°N 00.96°W

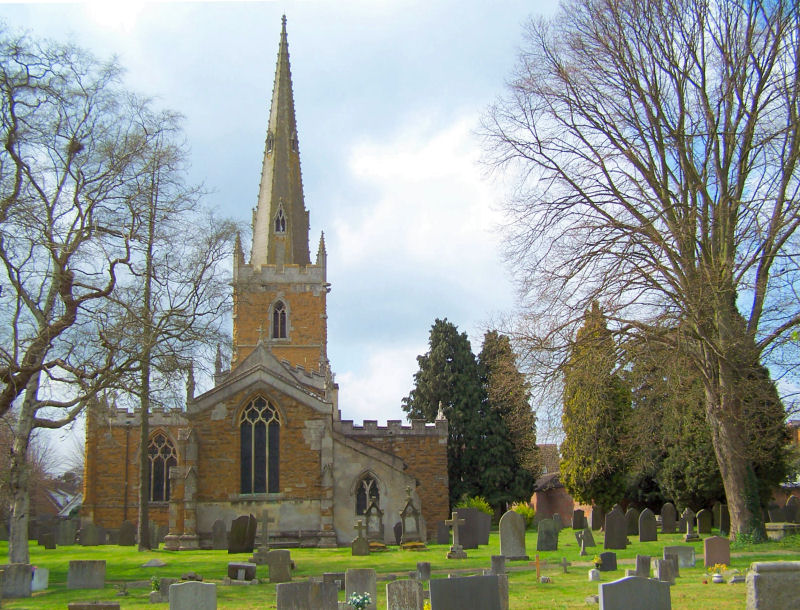
- All Saints' Church, Asfordby

- Location within Leicestershire
- Population: 3,286 (2011)
- OS grid reference: SK7019
- Shire county: Leicestershire
- Region: East Midlands
- Country: England
- Sovereign state: United Kingdom
- Post town: Melton Mowbray
- Postcode district: LE14
- Dialling code: 01664
- Police: Leicestershire
- Fire: Leicestershire
- Ambulance: East Midlands
- UK Parliament: Melton and Syston

Asfordby is a village and civil parish in the Melton district of Leicestershire, England. The village is located to the west of Melton Mowbray on the A6006 road and north-east of Leicester.

The village's name means "farm/settlement of Asfrothr".

The parish consists of Asfordby proper, Asfordby Valley and Asfordby Hill, which together have a population of around 3,000 (1995 est). The population had increased to 3,286 at the 2011 census. The villages are to the north of the River Wreake, with Asfordby Hill situated east of Asfordby proper, closer to Melton, and Asfordby Valley to the north. Asfordby proper is just over a mile away from the neighbouring village of Frisby on the Wreake.

Within Asfordby proper, there are few shops, including a convenience stores, a fish & chip shop, an Indian restaurant, a Chinese restaurant and a Co-operative shop.

Asfordby Hall was demolished in 1965.

Asfordby was the site of a modern deep coal pit, Asfordby Colliery, built between 1984 and 1993, but closed in 1997 due to numerous geological difficulties and the low price of coal at the time.

== Railway test track ==
The original Old Dalby test track is owned by BRB (Residuary) Ltd. and runs from Melton Mowbray via Asfordby to Edwalton. In the early 2000s it was leased to Alstom Transport Limited who upgraded and electrified the line and used it for testing the UK version of Pendolino tilting trains. After completion of the Pendolino testing in early 2005 the line was mothballed.

On 12 February 2007, Metronet announced that they had leased the track and would be refitting part of it to test the next generation of air conditioned tube trains.

The Alstom Midlands Test Centre (AMTC) HQ now occupies various buildings at the former mine complex at Asfordby.
