= Highfield Rangers F.C. =

Association football club in England

Coordinates: 52°39′46.99″N 1°05′43.05″W

Highfield Rangers
- Full name: Highfield Rangers Football Club
- Founded: 1970
- Ground: Gleneagles Avenue, Leicester
- League: Leicestershire Senior League Premier Division
- 2025–26: Leicestershire Senior League Premier Division, 10th of 16

Highfield Rangers F.C. is an English football club based in the Rushey Mead area of Leicester. They are currently members of the Leicestershire Senior League Premier Division.

== History ==
The club was established in 1970 by a group of immigrants from the West Indies. In 1988 they joined the Premier Division of the Central Midlands League. After four years of top-four finishes, the club joined the Leicestershire Senior League Premier Division in 1992. In 1998–99 they reached the third round of the FA Vase, which remains a club record. The following season they won the Premier Division.

== Honours ==
- Central Midlands League Premier Division
  - Runners-up 1989–90, 1990–91
- Leicestershire Senior League Premier Division
  - Champions 1999–2000

== Records ==
- FA Vase
  - Third Round 1998–99
