= Leicestershire Senior League =

Association football league in England

- Founded: 1896
- Country: England
- Divisions: Premier Division; Division One; Division Two
- Number of clubs: 40
- Level on pyramid: Level 11 (Premier Division)
- Feeder to: United Counties League
- Promotion to: United Counties League Division One
- Relegation to: Leicestershire County League
- Current champions: Anstey Town (2024–25)
- Website: FA Full-Time

The Leicestershire Senior League (currently sponsored by Everards Brewery) is a football competition based in Leicestershire, England.

== History ==
The league was formed in 1896, had a two-year hiatus between 1901 and 1903, and has run continuously since 1903 apart from during the two world wars and a four-year spell in the 1930s. A second division was added in 1948.

The longest serving team in the league was Holwell Sports, who completed 76 seasons in the league, 60 of them in the top division but left in 2008 to join the new East Midlands Counties Football League.

== Current structure ==
The league currently has three divisions, the Premier Division, Division One and Division Two (increased from 2 divisions ahead of the 2018–19 season), and is a feeder to the United Counties League. It fed the East Midlands Counties Football League until its dissolution in 2021. The Football Association classified the Leicestershire Senior League Premier Division as Step 7, due to the quality of football played and the standard of the grounds on which teams play. The First Division is therefore not part of the NLS, meaning that clubs in that division are not eligible to take part in the FA Vase. An application to re-grade the Premier Division to Step 6 was turned down by the FA in 2006. Step 7 was later abolished and the Premier Division was re-classified as an NLS county feeder.

For the 2008–09 season, eight of the leading sides left the league to join forces with eight clubs from the Central Midlands League to form a new league, the East Midlands Counties Football League, at Step 6 of the National League System. That league is now defunct.

== Champions ==
The champions of the league's top division since its creation have been as follows:

- 1896–97 Leicester Fosse Reserves
- 1897–98 Hinckley Town
- 1898–99 Swadlincote Town
- 1899–1900 Hinckley Town
- 1900–01 Gresley Rovers
- 1903–04 Loughborough Corinthians
- 1904–05 Leicester Fosse Reserves
- 1905–06 Leicester Fosse Reserves
- 1906–07 Leicester Fosse Reserves
- 1907–08 Coalville Town
- 1908–09 Hinckley United
- 1909–10 Hinckley United
- 1910–11 Shepshed Albion
- 1911–12 Holwell Works
- 1912–13 Loughborough Corinthians
- 1913–14 Hinckley United
- 1914–15 Whitwick Imperial
- 1915–16 Coalville Swifts
- 1918–19 Coalville Swifts
- 1919–20 Whitwick Imperial
- 1920–21 Shepshed Albion
- 1921–22 Whitwick Imperial
- 1922–23 Whitwick Imperial
- 1923–24 Ashby Town
- 1924–25 Whitwick Imperial
- 1925–26 Barwell United
- 1926–27 Mountsorrel Town
- 1927–28 Burton Town Reserves
- 1928–29 Burton Town Reserves
- 1929–30 Burton Town Reserves
- 1934–35 New Lount Colliery
- 1935–36 HM Mansfields Sports
- 1936–37 Loughborough Brush
- 1937–38 HM Mansfields Sports
- 1938–39 Donisthorpe
- 1946–47 Gresley Rovers (Central) and Moira United (Western)
- 1947–48 Gresley Rovers (Central) and Moira United (Western)
- 1948–49 Coalville Town
- 1949–50 Nuneaton Borough Reserves
- 1950–51 Quorn Methodists
- 1951–52 Anstey Nomads
- 1952–53 Measham Imperial
- 1953–54 Anstey Nomads
- 1954–55 Leicester City 'A'
- 1955–56 Whitwick Colliery Reserves
- 1956–57 Leicester City 'A'
- 1957–58 Leicester City 'A'
- 1958–59 Stapenhill
- 1959–60 Stapenhill
- 1960–61 Whitwick Colliery
- 1961–62 Syston St Peters
- 1962–63 Enderby Town
- 1963–64 Oadby Town
- 1964–65 Enderby Town
- 1965–66 Newfoundpool WMC
- 1966–67 Enderby Town
- 1967–68 Oadby Town
- 1968–69 Oadby Town
- 1969–70 Newfoundpool WMC
- 1970–71 Friar Lane Old Boys
- 1971–72 Friar Lane Old Boys
- 1972–73 Oadby Town
- 1973–74 Friar Lane Old Boys
- 1974–75 Friar Lane Old Boys
- 1975–76 Friar Lane Old Boys
- 1976–77 Friar Lane Old Boys
- 1977–78 Friar Lane Old Boys
- 1978–79 Shepshed Charterhouse
- 1979–80 Shepshed Charterhouse
- 1980–81 Shepshed Charterhouse
- 1981–82 Anstey Nomads
- 1982–83 Anstey Nomads
- 1983–84 Melton Town
- 1984–85 Thringstone
- 1985–86 Thringstone
- 1986–87 Stapenhill
- 1987–88 Holwell Works
- 1988–89 Stapenhill
- 1989–90 St Andrews SC
- 1990–91 Lutterworth Town
- 1991–92 Holwell Sports
- 1992–93 Holwell Sports
- 1993–94 St Andrews SC
- 1994–95 Oadby Town
- 1995–96 St Andrews SC
- 1996–97 Oadby Town
- 1997–98 Oadby Town
- 1998–99 Oadby Town
- 1999–2000 Highfield Rangers
- 2000–01 Quorn
- 2001–02 Coalville Town
- 2002–03 Coalville Town
- 2003–04 Loughborough Dynamo
- 2004–05 Thurnby Rangers
- 2005–06 Friar Lane & Epworth
- 2006–07 Stapenhill
- 2007–08 Kirby Muxloe SC
- 2008–09 Anstey Nomads
- 2009–10 Thurmaston Town
- 2010–11 Ashby Ivanhoe
- 2011–12 Rothley Imperial
- 2012–13 Rothley Imperial
- 2013–14 Allexton & New Parks
- 2014–15 Sileby Town
- 2015–16 Birstall United
- 2016–17 Lutterworth Town
- 2017–18 Ingles
- 2018–19 Rugby Borough
- 2019–20 not completed due to COVID-19
- 2020–21 Friar Lane & Epworth
- 2021–22 Rugby Borough
- 2022–23 Asfordby
- 2023–24 Allexton & New Parks
- 2024–25 Anstey Town
- 2025–26 Loughborough Students Development

== 2026–27 members ==
=== Premier Division ===
- Aylestone Park Reserves
- Burbage & Huncote
- Community Football Academy
- Cottesmore
- FC Khalsa GAD
- Friar Lane & Epworth
- Hathern
- Highfield Rangers
- Leicester Atletico
- Loughborough Students Development
- Lutterworth Athletic Reserves
- Magna 73
- Melton Town
- Sileby Town
- St. Patricks
- Thurnby Rangers
Location of the Premier Division clubs for the 2026–27 season
Location of the Premier Division clubs for the 2026–27 season (Leicester)

=== Division One ===
- Barrow Town
- Birstall United Reserves
- Desford
- Ellistown
- Glen Villa
- Heather St. John's Reserves
- Hinckley LR
- Holwell Sports Reserves
- Houghton Rangers
- Kirby Muxloe Reserves
- Loughborough Dynamo
- Mountsorrel Amateurs
- Saffron Dynamo Reserves
- Sileby Town Reserves
- Sporting Markfield
- Whetstone Athletic
Location of the Division One clubs for the 2026–27 season
Location of the Division One clubs for the 2026–27 season (Leicester)

=== Division Two ===
- AFC Andrews
- Ashby Ivanhoe Reserves
- Barrow Town Reserves
- FCV Grace Dieu Development
- Friar Lane & Epworth Reserves
- Highfield Rangers Reserves
- Leicester United
- LFE
- Loughborough
- Lutterworth Town Reserves
- Magna 73 Reserves
- Nuneaton Griff Reserves
- Rothley Imperial
- Rouge Elite
- Stoneygate
Location of the Division Two clubs for the 2026–27 season
Location of the Division Two clubs for the 2026–27 season (Leicester)
