= 2009–10 East Midlands Counties Football League =

The 2009–10 East Midlands Counties Football League season was the second in the history of East Midlands Counties Football League, a football competition in England.

== League ==
East Midlands Counties Football League
- Season: 2009–10
- Champions: Dunkirk
- Promoted: Dunkirk
- Matches: 380
- Goals: 1,553 (4.09 per match)

The league featured 17 clubs from the previous season, along with three new clubs:

- Anstey Nomads, promoted from the Leicestershire Senior League
- Gresley, reformed club
- Radcliffe Olympic, promoted from the Central Midlands Football League

=== League table ===
Pos	Team	Pld	W	D	L	GF	GA	GD	Pts	Promotion or relegation
1	Dunkirk	38	28	6	4	126	38	+88	90	Promoted to the Midland Football Alliance
2	Gresley	38	26	6	6	110	39	+71	84	
3	Holbrook Miners Welfare	38	26	5	7	99	45	+54	83	
4	Bardon Hill Sports	38	26	5	7	113	66	+47	83	
5	Radcliffe Olympic	38	23	7	8	88	49	+39	76	
6	Greenwood Meadows	38	20	8	10	84	53	+31	68	
7	Heanor Town	38	19	8	11	99	70	+29	65	
8	Gedling Miners Welfare	38	20	5	13	69	57	+12	65	
9	Gedling Town	38	20	5	13	89	57	+32	62 (Note: Gedling Town were deducted 3 points.)	
10	Hinckley Downes	38	18	4	16	91	81	+10	58	
11	Borrowash Victoria	38	16	6	16	73	70	+3	54	
12	Barrow Town	38	14	5	19	75	81	−6	47	
13	Holwell Sports	38	12	8	18	71	72	−1	43 (Note: Holwell Sports were deducted 1 point.)	
14	Ibstock United	38	11	9	18	50	78	−28	42	
15	St Andrews	38	14	3	21	74	117	−43	42 (Note: St Andrews were deducted 3 points.)	
16	Ellistown	38	8	10	20	62	100	−38	34	
17	Blackwell Miners Welfare	38	7	8	23	56	95	−39	29	
18	Graham Street Prims	38	7	3	28	51	111	−60	24	
19	Radford	38	5	4	29	48	113	−65	19	
20	Anstey Nomads	38	1	3	34	25	161	−136	6	

Source: fchd
Rules for classification: 1) points; 2) goal difference; 3) number of goals scored.
