= 2010–11 East Midlands Counties Football League =

The 2010–11 East Midlands Counties Football League season was the third in the history of East Midlands Counties Football League, a football competition in England.

== League ==
East Midlands Counties Football League
- Season: 2010–11
- Champions: Gresley
- Promoted: Gresley
- Matches: 380
- Goals: 1,378 (3.63 per match)

The league featured 19 clubs from the previous season, along with one new club:

- Thurnby Nirvana, promoted from the Leicestershire Senior League

Also, Bardon Hill Sports changed name to Bardon Hill, Hinckley Downes changed name to Hinckley, Holbrook Miners Welfare changed name to Holbrook Sports.

=== League table ===
Pos	Team	Pld	W	D	L	GF	GA	GD	Pts	Promotion or relegation
1	Gresley	38	28	6	4	109	36	+73	90	Promoted to the Midland Football Alliance
2	Borrowash Victoria	38	27	7	4	79	23	+56	88	
3	Heanor Town	38	26	6	6	118	41	+77	84	
4	Gedling Miners Welfare	38	26	5	7	76	36	+40	83	
5	Barrow Town	38	23	4	11	70	44	+26	73	
6	Holbrook Sports	38	21	4	13	93	56	+37	67	
7	Radcliffe Olympic	38	19	4	15	73	53	+20	61	
8	Bardon Hill	38	18	5	15	83	65	+18	59	
9	Thurnby Nirvana	38	18	4	16	85	67	+18	58	
10	Greenwood Meadows	38	15	10	13	68	62	+6	55	
11	Hinckley	38	18	8	12	71	75	−4	53 (Note: Hinckley were deducted 9 points.)	Club folded
12	Anstey Nomads	38	15	4	19	56	102	−46	49	
13	Holwell Sports	38	11	7	20	55	73	−18	40	
14	Graham Street Prims	38	10	9	19	46	80	−34	39	
15	Ellistown	38	11	5	22	52	83	−31	38	
16	Ibstock United	38	10	4	24	46	78	−32	34	
17	St Andrews	38	9	9	20	60	86	−26	33 (Note: St Andrews were deducted 3 points.)	
18	Gedling Town	38	9	4	25	53	91	−38	28 (Note: Gedling Town were deducted 3 points.)	Club folded
19	Radford	38	6	4	28	50	107	−57	22	
20	Blackwell Miners Welfare	38	5	1	32	35	120	−85	16	

Source: fchd
Rules for classification: 1) points; 2) goal difference; 3) number of goals scored.
