= 2008–09 East Midlands Counties Football League =

The 2008–09 East Midlands Counties Football League season was the first in the history of East Midlands Counties Football League, a football competition in England.

== League ==
East Midlands Counties Football League
- Season: 2009–09
- Champions: Kirby Muxloe
- Promoted: Kirby Muxloe
- Matches: 306
- Goals: 1,046 (3.42 per match)

The league was formed by the clubs joined from three local leagues.

Clubs, transferred from the Northern Counties East League:

- Borrowash Victoria
- Gedling Town

Clubs, joined from the Central Midlands Football League:

- Blackwell Miners Welfare
- Dunkirk
- Gedling Miners Welfare
- Graham Street Prims
- Greenwood Meadows
- Heanor Town
- Holbrook Miners Welfare
- Radford

Clubs, joined from the Leicestershire Senior League:

- Bardon Hill Sports
- Barrow Town
- Ellistown
- Hinckley Downes
- Holwell Sports
- Ibstock United
- Kirby Muxloe
- St Andrews

=== League table ===
Pos	Team	Pld	W	D	L	GF	GA	GD	Pts	Promotion or relegation
1	Kirby Muxloe	34	23	6	5	83	38	+45	75	Promoted to the Midland Football Alliance
2	Borrowash Victoria	34	21	9	4	80	37	+43	72	
3	Holbrook Miners Welfare	34	20	9	5	68	29	+39	69	
4	Gedling Town	34	20	7	7	84	49	+35	67	
5	Dunkirk	34	18	7	9	59	38	+21	61	
6	Barrow Town	34	18	4	12	67	58	+9	58	
7	Holwell Sports	34	17	6	11	68	42	+26	57	
8	Gedling Miners Welfare	34	15	4	15	55	60	−5	49	
9	St Andrews	34	13	6	15	64	64	0	45	
10	Hinckley Downes	34	14	2	18	54	57	−3	44	
11	Greenwood Meadows	34	11	9	14	47	61	−14	42	
12	Heanor Town	34	12	4	18	53	63	−10	40	
13	Graham Street Prims	34	11	6	17	58	72	−14	39	
14	Radford	34	9	7	18	47	79	−32	34	
15	Ibstock United	34	8	9	17	34	61	−27	33	
16	Ellistown	34	8	8	18	57	72	−15	32	
17	Bardon Hill Sports	34	9	5	20	48	76	−28	32	
18	Blackwell Miners Welfare	34	3	4	27	20	90	−70	13	

Source: fchd
Rules for classification: 1) points; 2) goal difference; 3) number of goals scored.
