= 2016–17 East Midlands Counties Football League =

The 2016–17 East Midlands Counties Football League season was the 9th in the history of East Midlands Counties Football League, a football competition in England.

== League ==
East Midlands Counties Football League
- Season: 2016–17
- Champions: West Bridgford
- Promoted: South Normanton Athletic
- Relegated: Greenwood Meadows; Ellistown & Ibstock United
- Matches: 462
- Goals: 1,841 (3.98 per match)
- Top goalscorer: 41 goals Steven Hart Stapenhill
- Biggest home win: Dunkirk 13–0 Graham Street Prims (25 April 2017)
- Biggest away win: Ellistown & Ibstock United 0-11 Birstall United (19 November 2016)
- Highest scoring: Dunkirk 13–0 Graham Street Prims (25 April 2017)
- Longest winning run: 9 matches South Normanton Athletic
- Longest unbeaten run: 18 matches Dunkirk
- Longest losing run: 10 matches Ellistown & Ibstock United
- Highest attendance: 152; Gedling Miners Welfare 0–3 Arnold Town (18 April 2017)
- Lowest attendance: 14; Greenwood Meadows 0–1 Graham Street Prims (20 August 2016)
- Average attendance: 50

The league featured 18 clubs from the previous season, along with four new clubs:

- Belper United, promoted from the Central Midlands Football League
- Birstall United, promoted from the Leicestershire Senior League
- Dunkirk, relegated from the Midland Football League
- West Bridgford, promoted from the Nottinghamshire Senior League

=== League table ===
Pos	Team	Pld	W	D	L	GF	GA	GD	Pts	Promotion or relegation
1	West Bridgford	42	29	7	6	115	52	+63	94	
2	South Normanton Athletic	42	26	8	8	94	46	+48	86	Promoted to the Midland League
3	Birstall United	42	27	4	11	105	48	+57	85	
4	Aylestone Park	42	25	6	11	104	59	+45	81	
5	Dunkirk	42	23	7	12	106	70	+36	76	
6	Blaby & Whetstone Athletic	42	23	7	12	105	71	+34	76	
7	Radford	42	21	11	10	100	57	+43	74	
8	Kimberley Miners Welfare	42	23	5	14	85	62	+23	74	
9	Radcliffe Olympic	42	22	5	15	101	97	+4	71	
10	Ashby Ivanhoe	42	20	10	12	97	66	+31	70	
11	Stapenhill	42	20	7	15	104	88	+16	67	
12	Borrowash Victoria	42	16	10	16	98	87	+11	58	
13	Belper United	42	17	7	18	78	73	+5	58	
14	Barrow Town	42	15	13	14	86	82	+4	58	
15	Arnold Town	42	17	6	19	88	101	−13	57	
16	Holwell Sports	42	17	4	21	78	86	−8	55	
17	Anstey Nomads	42	12	9	21	70	97	−27	45	
18	Holbrook Sports	42	9	6	27	55	110	−55	33	
19	Graham Street Prims	42	9	4	29	52	120	−68	31	
20	Gedling Miners Welfare	42	7	3	32	40	132	−92	24	
21	Greenwood Meadows	42	10	6	26	57	79	−22	18 (Note: Greenwood Meadows have been deducted 18 points for failing to fulfil fixtures against: Gedling Miners Welfare on 8 April; Holwell Sports on 12 April; Borrowash Victoria on 15 April; Dunkirk on 17 April; Radford on 29 April; Ashby Ivanhoe on 3 May)	Relegated to the Central Midlands League and folded
22	Ellistown & Ibstock United	42	0	3	39	23	158	−135	3	Relegated to the Leicestershire Senior League

Source: FA Full-Time
Rules for classification: 1) Points; 2) Goal difference; 3) Number of goals scored; 4) Number of matches won; 5) Head-to-head results
