= 2015–16 East Midlands Counties Football League =

The 2015–16 East Midlands Counties Football League season was the 8th in the history of East Midlands Counties Football League, a football competition in England.

== League ==
East Midlands Counties Football League
- Season: 2015–16
- Champions: St Andrews
- Promoted: St Andrews
- Matches: 342
- Goals: 1,270 (3.71 per match)
- Top goalscorer: 35 goals Aaron Preston Blaby & Whetstone Athletic
- Biggest home win: Blaby & Whetstone Athletic 9–1 Kimberley Miners Welfare (30 January 2016)
- Biggest away win: Greenwood Meadows 0-10 Blaby & Whetstone Athletic (5 December 2015)
- Highest scoring: Greenwood Meadows 0-10 Blaby & Whetstone Athletic (5 December 2015); Blaby & Whetstone Athletic 9–1 Kimberley Miners Welfare (30 January 2016); Ellistown & Ibstock United 1-9 St Andrews (8 December 2015)
- Longest winning run: 9 matches St Andrews
- Longest unbeaten run: 13 matches St Andrews
- Longest losing run: 16 matches Arnold Town
- Highest attendance: 175; Ashby Ivanhoe 0–3 St Andrews (19 March 2016)
- Lowest attendance: 8 Blaby & Whetstone Athletic 3-1 Greenwood Meadows (2 April 2016)
- Average attendance: 50

The league featured 19 clubs from the previous season, along with one new club:

- Mickleover Royals, promoted from the Central Midlands Football League

=== League table ===
Pos	Team	Pld	W	D	L	GF	GA	GD	Pts	Promotion or relegation
1	St Andrews	36	28	2	6	115	29	+86	86	Promoted to the Midland Football League
2	Radford	36	25	4	7	105	41	+64	79	
3	Ashby Ivanhoe	36	24	5	7	86	33	+53	77	
4	South Normanton Athletic	36	24	5	7	84	34	+50	77	
5	Aylestone Park	36	21	5	10	84	54	+30	68	
6	Anstey Nomads	36	18	10	8	63	52	+11	64	
7	Blaby & Whetstone Athletic	36	18	5	13	85	57	+28	59	
8	Holbrook Sports	36	17	6	13	67	53	+14	57	
9	Borrowash Victoria	36	18	1	17	72	69	+3	55	
10	Radcliffe Olympic	36	16	6	14	70	56	+14	54	
11	Graham Street Prims	36	16	5	15	68	67	+1	53	
12	Stapenhill	36	12	6	18	51	64	−13	42	
13	Barrow Town	36	10	10	16	55	61	−6	40	
14	Gedling Miners Welfare	36	9	8	19	51	65	−14	35	
15	Kimberley Miners Welfare	36	9	6	21	43	83	−40	33	
16	Holwell Sports	36	8	7	21	52	97	−45	31	
17	Ellistown & Ibstock United	36	8	5	23	44	94	−50	29	
18	Arnold Town	36	7	4	25	48	118	−70	22 (Note: Arnold Town were deducted 3 points for failing to fulfil a fixture.)	
19	Greenwood Meadows	36	3	2	31	25	141	−116	10 (Note: Greenwood Meadows were deducted 1 point for fielding an ineligible player.)	
20	Mickleover Royals	0	0	0	0	0	0	0	0	Club resigned, record expunged

Source: fchd
Rules for classification: 1) points; 2) goal difference; 3) number of goals scored.
