= 2017–18 East Midlands Counties Football League =

The 2017–18 East Midlands Counties Football League season was the 10th in the history of East Midlands Counties Football League, a football competition in England at level 10 of the English football league system.

== League ==
East Midlands Counties Football League
- Season: 2017–18
- Champions: Dunkirk
- Promoted: Dunkirk
- Relegated: Radcliffe Olympic
- Matches: 420
- Goals: 1,639 (3.9 per match)
- Top goalscorer: Tyrell Shannon-Lewis (Clifton All Whites); 39 goals
- Biggest home win: Radford 10–0 Radcliffe Olympic (22 August 2017)
- Biggest away win: Arnold Town 1–10 Clifton All Whites (1 May 2018)
- Highest scoring: Arnold Town 8–3 Holwell Sports (21 October 2017); Arnold Town 1-10 Clifton All Whites (1 May 2018)
- Longest winning run: 9 matches Dunkirk
- Longest unbeaten run: 14 matches Dunkirk
- Longest losing run: 11 matches Radcliffe Olympic; Borrowash Victoria
- Highest attendance: 342; Selston 3–0 West Bridgford (21 April 2018)
- Lowest attendance: 10; Radcliffe Olympic 2–3 Barrow Town (28 October 2017); Stapenhill 0-2 Clifton All Whites (14 April 2018) (Played at Clifton); Radcliffe Olympic 1-2 Birstall United (1 May 2018)
- Average attendance: 51

The league featured 19 clubs from the previous season, along with three new clubs:

- Clifton All Whites, promoted from the Nottinghamshire Senior League
- Selston, promoted from the Central Midlands Football League
- Teversal, transferred from the Northern Counties East League

=== League table ===
Pos	Team	Pld	W	D	L	GF	GA	GD	Pts	Promotion or relegation
1	Dunkirk	40	28	5	7	133	49	+84	89	Promoted to the Midland League
2	Anstey Nomads	40	29	2	9	116	56	+60	89	Transferred to the United Counties League
3	Teversal	40	28	3	9	93	51	+42	87	
4	Selston	40	25	6	9	97	59	+38	81	
5	Belper United	40	21	11	8	76	44	+32	74	
6	Kimberley Miners Welfare	40	21	8	11	75	56	+19	71	
7	Radford	40	21	7	12	104	57	+47	70	
8	Birstall United	40	21	6	13	98	67	+31	69	Transferred to the United Counties League
9	Aylestone Park	40	21	3	16	90	67	+23	66	Transferred to the United Counties League
10	Gedling Miners Welfare	40	20	2	18	71	65	+6	62	
11	Barrow Town	40	18	7	15	76	72	+4	61	
12	Clifton All Whites	40	17	8	15	102	73	+29	59	
13	Stapenhill	40	14	8	18	87	86	+1	50	Transferred to the Midland League Division One
14	Holbrook Sports	40	14	2	24	60	82	−22	44	Resigned to the Central Midlands Football League
15	West Bridgford	40	14	2	24	56	96	−40	44	
16	Graham Street Prims	40	11	10	19	56	86	−30	43	
17	Ashby Ivanhoe	40	12	3	25	55	81	−26	39	
18	Holwell Sports	40	10	8	22	61	98	−37	38	Transferred to the United Counties League
19	Borrowash Victoria	40	10	4	26	58	120	−62	34	
20	Arnold Town	40	7	1	32	48	131	−83	19 (Note: Arnold Town were deducted three points for failing to fulfil a fixture against Stapenhill on 18 November.)	
21	Radcliffe Olympic	40	4	2	34	27	143	−116	14	Relegated to the Nottinghamshire Senior League
22	Blaby & Whetstone Athletic	0	0	0	0	0	0	0	0 (Note: Blaby & Whetstone Athletic were deducted three points for fielding an ineligible player against Barrow Town on 16 December, and a further three points for failing to fulfil a fixture on 17 February. On 23 March they submitted their resignation to the league after playing 29 matches, 2 days later their playing record was expunged.)	Resigned to the Leicestershire Senior League

Source: FA Full-Time
Rules for classification: 1) Points; 2) Goal difference; 3) Number of goals scored; 4) Number of matches won; 5) Head-to-head results

=== Stadia and locations ===
Location of the clubs in the 2017–18 East Midlands Counties League on a map of the East Midlands

Club	Stadium	Seats
Anstey Nomads	Cropston Road	100
Arnold Town	Eagle Valley	100
Ashby Ivanhoe	Lower Packington Road	50
Aylestone Park	Saffron Lane	100
Barrow Town	Barrow Road	100
Belper United	Borrowash Road (Note: home of Borrowash Victoria (groundshare))	100
Birstall United	Meadow Lane	
Blaby & Whetstone Athletic	Warwick Road	100
Borrowash Victoria	Borrowash Road	100
Clifton All Whites	Green Lane	
Dunkirk	Lenton Lane	
Gedling Miners Welfare	Plains Road	100
Graham Street Prims	Borrowash Road	
Holbrook Sports	Shaw Lane	100
Holwell Sports	Welby Road	100
Kimberley Miners Welfare	The Stag Ground	100
Radcliffe Olympic	Wharf Lane	100
Radford	Selhurst Street	100
Selston	Mansfield Road	54
Stapenhill	Maple Grove	100
Teversal	Carnarvon Street	100
West Bridgford	Regatta Way	
