= 2020–21 United Counties League =

The 2020–21 season was the 114th in the history of the United Counties League, a football competition in England. The league operated two divisions in the English football league system, the Premier Division at Step 5 and Division One at Step 6, for the last time this season.

The allocations for Steps 5 and 6 for season 2020–21 were announced by the FA on 21 July 2020, and were subject to appeal.

The league season was subsequently abandoned on 24 February 2021 after COVID-19 lockdown-originated restrictions were imposed.

== Promotion and restructuring ==
The scheduled restructuring of non-league football took place at the end of the season, to include a new division that was added to the United Counties League at Step 5 for 2021–22. Promotions from Steps 5 to 4 and 6 to 5 were based on points per game across all matches over the two abandoned seasons (2019–20 and 2020–21), while teams were promoted to Step 6 on the basis of a subjective application process.

== Premier Division ==
United Counties League Premier Division
- Season: 2020–21
- Promoted: Shepshed Dynamo
- Matches: 110
- Goals: 429 (3.9 per match)

The Premier Division comprised 20 teams, the same set of teams which competed in the previous season's voided competition.

=== League table ===
Pos	Team	Pld	W	D	L	GF	GA	GD	Pts	Promotion or qualification
1	Anstey Nomads	10	9	1	0	32	5	+27	28	Placed in the Premier Division North
2	Loughborough University	13	8	2	3	42	17	+25	26	Placed in the Premier Division North
3	Lutterworth Town	13	8	2	3	35	18	+17	26	Placed in the Premier Division South
4	Quorn	11	6	4	1	37	17	+20	22	Placed in the Premier Division North
5	Shepshed Dynamo	9	6	2	1	23	8	+15	20	Promoted to the Northern Premier League (Note: Promoted based on points per game calculations from 2019–20 and 2020–21 seasons combined.)
6	Wellingborough Town	14	5	5	4	23	23	0	20	Placed in the Premier Division South
7	Rugby Town	10	6	1	3	29	10	+19	19	Placed in the Premier Division South
8	Harborough Town	12	5	3	4	19	19	0	18	Placed in the Premier Division South
9	Northampton ON Chenecks	12	5	2	5	27	22	+5	17	Placed in the Premier Division South
10	Rothwell Corinthians	13	4	5	4	20	20	0	17	Placed in the Premier Division South
11	Deeping Rangers	9	5	1	3	14	17	−3	16	Placed in the Premier Division North
12	Holbeach United	10	4	3	3	21	11	+10	15	Placed in the Premier Division North
13	Cogenhoe United	9	4	2	3	19	13	+6	14	Placed in the Premier Division South
14	Boston Town	11	4	1	6	23	15	+8	13	Placed in the Premier Division North
15	GNG Oadby Town	10	3	3	4	15	24	−9	12	Placed in the Premier Division South
16	Desborough Town	11	3	2	6	16	36	−20	11	Placed in the Premier Division South
17	Leicester Nirvana	10	2	0	8	9	23	−14	6	Placed in the Premier Division North
18	Sleaford Town	11	1	1	9	9	44	−35	4	Placed in the Premier Division North
19	Pinchbeck United	10	0	2	8	6	38	−32	2	Placed in the Premier Division North
20	Peterborough Northern Star	12	0	2	10	10	49	−39	2	Placed in the Premier Division South

Source: FA Full-time
Rules for classification: 1) Points; 2) Goal difference; 3) Number of goals scored; 4) Number of matches won; 5) Head-to-head results

=== Stadia and locations ===
Location of the Premier Division clubs

Club	Location	Stadium	Capacity
Anstey Nomads	Anstey	Cropston Road	
Boston Town	Boston	Tattershall Road	6,000
Cogenhoe United	Cogenhoe	Compton Park	5,000
Deeping Rangers	Market Deeping	Haydon Whitham Stadium	2,000
Desborough Town	Desborough	Waterworks Field	
GNG Oadby Town	Oadby	Riverside Football Ground	
Harborough Town	Market Harborough	Bowden Park	
Holbeach United	Holbeach	Carters Park	4,000
Leicester Nirvana	Leicester	Hamilton Park	
Loughborough University	Loughborough	Loughborough University Stadium	3,000
Lutterworth Town	Lutterworth	Dunley Way	
Northampton ON Chenecks	Northampton	The Old Northamptonians Sports Ground	1,000
Peterborough Northern Star	Peterborough	Branch Bros Stadium	600
Pinchbeck United	Spalding	Sir Halley Stewart Field (groundshare with Spalding United)	2,700
Quorn	Quorn	Farley Way Stadium	1,400
Rothwell Corinthians	Rothwell	Sergeants Lawn	
Rugby Town	Rugby	Butlin Road	6,000
Shepshed Dynamo	Shepshed	Dovecote Stadium	2,500
Sleaford Town	Sleaford	Eslaforde Park	1,000
Wellingborough Town	Wellingborough	London Road	2,500

== Division One ==
United Counties League Division One
- Season: 2020–21
- Promoted: Bugbrooke St Michaels; Long Buckby; Melton Town
- Matches: 112
- Goals: 502 (4.48 per match)

Division One comprised the same 20 teams which competed in the previous season's aborted competition.

=== League table ===
Pos	Team	Pld	W	D	L	GF	GA	GD	Pts	Promotion or qualification
1	Long Buckby	11	9	1	1	38	10	+28	28	Promoted to the Premier Division South (Note: Promoted based on points per game calculations from 2019–20 and 2020–21 seasons combined.)
2	Melton Town	11	9	0	2	50	13	+37	27	Promoted to the Premier Division North
3	St Andrews	11	9	0	2	42	10	+32	27	
4	Bugbrooke St Michaels	14	7	4	3	32	25	+7	25	Promoted to the Premier Division South
5	Harrowby United	10	7	2	1	27	10	+17	23	
6	Blackstones	11	5	2	4	23	17	+6	17	
7	Northampton Sileby Rangers	10	5	2	3	18	12	+6	17	Transferred to the Spartan South Midlands League
8	Saffron Dynamo	12	5	2	5	22	25	−3	17	
9	Whittlesey Athletic	12	3	6	3	25	23	+2	15	Transferred to the Eastern Counties League
10	Huntingdon Town	12	4	3	5	17	21	−4	15	Transferred to the Eastern Counties League
11	Aylestone Park	10	4	2	4	35	21	+14	14	
12	Holwell Sports	11	4	2	5	23	19	+4	14	
13	Lutterworth Athletic	11	3	4	4	28	25	+3	13	
14	Birstall United	13	4	1	8	24	39	−15	13	
15	Wellingborough Whitworth	12	3	3	6	23	45	−22	12	Transferred to the Spartan South Midlands League
16	Bourne Town	9	3	3	3	14	18	−4	9 (Note: Bourne Town received a 3 point deduction for fielding an ineligible player during the match on 19 September.)	
17	Raunds Town	11	2	2	7	19	35	−16	8	Transferred to the Spartan South Midlands League
18	Irchester United	12	1	4	7	20	45	−25	7	Transferred to the Spartan South Midlands League
19	Burton Park Wanderers	10	1	2	7	10	36	−26	5	Transferred to the Spartan South Midlands League
20	Rushden & Higham United	11	1	1	9	12	53	−41	4	Transferred to the Spartan South Midlands League

Source: FA Full-time
Rules for classification: 1) Points; 2) Goal difference; 3) Number of goals scored; 4) Number of matches won; 5) Head-to-head results

=== Stadia and locations ===
Location of Division One clubs
Location of Division One clubs

Club	Location	Stadium	Capacity
Aylestone Park	Leicester	Saffron Lane	1,128
Birstall United	Birstall	Meadow Lane	
Blackstones	Stamford	Lincoln Road	1,000
Bourne Town	Bourne	Abbey Lawn	2,000
Bugbrooke St. Michaels	Bugbrooke	Birds Close	2,500
Burton Park Wanderers	Burton Latimer	Latimer Park	
Harrowby United	Grantham	Dickens Road	
Holwell Sports	Asfordby Hill	Welby Road	1,000
Huntingdon Town	Huntingdon	Jubilee Park	
Irchester United	Irchester	Alfred Street	1,000
Long Buckby	Long Buckby	Station Road	1,000
Lutterworth Athletic	Lutterworth	Hall Park	
Melton Town	Melton Mowbray	Melton Sports Village	
Northampton Sileby Rangers	Northampton	Fernie Fields	
Raunds Town	Raunds	Kiln Park	3,000
Rushden & Higham United	Rushden	Hayden Road	1,500
Saffron Dynamo	Cosby	Cambridge Road	
St Andrews	Leicester	Canal Street	1,000
Wellingborough Whitworth	Wellingborough	Victoria Mill Ground	2,140
Whittlesey Athletic	Whittlesey	Feldale Field	
