= Julian Joachim =

English footballer (born 1974)

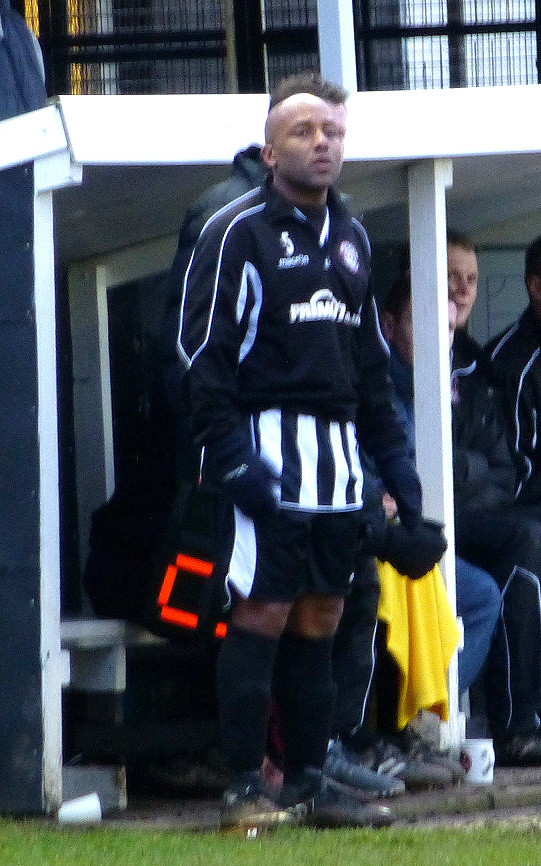
- Julian Joachim at Shepshed Dynamo

Personal information
- Full name: Julian Kevin Joachim
- Date of birth: 20 September 1974 (age 52)
- Place of birth: Peterborough, England
- Position: Striker

Youth career
- Leicester City

Senior career*
Years	Team	Apps	(Gls)
1992–1996	Leicester City	99	(25)
1996–2001	Aston Villa	141	(39)
2001–2004	Coventry City	56	(11)
2004–2005	Leeds United	27	(2)
2005	→ Walsall (loan)	8	(6)
2005–2006	Boston United	46	(17)
2006–2008	Darlington	76	(13)
2008–2009	King's Lynn	33	(6)
2009	Thurmaston Town		
2009–2010	Quorn		
2010	Hinckley United		
2010–2011	Holbeach United		
2011	Boston United	1	(0)
2011	Coalville Town		
2013	Holbeach United	3	(1)
2013–2014	Oadby Town	17	(2)
2014–2015	Shepshed Dynamo	14	(0)
2015–2016	Holwell Sports	30	(8)
2016–2017	Newark Town	9	(7)
2017	Montpellier	7	(5)
2017–2018	Radcliffe Olympic	38	(4)
2018–2019	Aslockton & Orston	34	(27)
2019	Europa Point	0	(0)
2019–2020	Bourne Town		

International career
1993	England U18	7	(0)
1993	England U19	4	(0)
1994–1995	England U21	9	(1)
- * Club domestic league appearances and goals as of 15:39, 21 April 2019 (UTC)

Julian Kevin Joachim (born 20 September 1974) is an English former professional footballer who played as a forward. He is an advisor at Europa Point in the Gibraltar National League.

During his professional career he initially played from 1992 until 2011, but he came out of retirement in 2013. Joachim notably played in the Premier League for Leicester City and Aston Villa, having also played in the Football League for Coventry City, Leeds United, Walsall, Boston United and Darlington and was capped nine times by England U21, scoring one goal. Over the course of his career in professional football, he scored over 100 league goals and accumulated over 450 league appearances and played in the 2000 FA Cup final.

Since 2008 he has been a non-league football journeyman and has played for King's Lynn, Thurmaston Town, Quorn, Hinckley United, Holbeach United, Coalville Town, Oadby Town, Shepshed Dynamo, Holwell Sports, Newark Town, Radcliffe Olympic, Aslockton & Orston and Bourne Town.

== Playing career ==
Joachim came through the youth system at Leicester City, and went on to score the club's first ever Premier League goal on the opening day of the 1994–95 season in a 3–1 home defeat to Newcastle United.

The 21-year-old was sold to Aston Villa in 1996 for £1.5 million, making his debut for them as a substitute against Wimbledon on 24 February 1996. He was cup-tied for their victory in the 1996 Football League Cup final having played in the competition for Leicester City earlier that season. He was top goalscorer 1998–99. Playing for Villa, he appeared in the 2001 American crime thriller, Hannibal, briefly seen on a TV screen playing in the background.

After five seasons in the Premiership, Joachim dropped down a division to play for the relegated Coventry City in a deal that saw Villa exchange Joachim plus £2 million for Mustapha Hadji.

In 2004 Joachim moved to Leeds United, a club heavily in debt and in the process of rebuilding an inexpensive team, on a free transfer. He made 10 starts and 17 substitute appearances in the league for Leeds that year, but could only deliver two goals before being loaned out to Walsall for the final two months of the season. After turning down Walsall he dropped down another division to League Two. Joachim spent the 2005–06 season with Boston United whom he joined in July 2005. He moved to another League Two side, Darlington, for a club record fee of £100,000 on 14 August 2006. Despite making 40 league appearances and scoring 9 goals as Darlington reached the play-offs, Joachim was released at the end of the 2007–08 season. He subsequently moved into non-league football, signing with newly promoted Conference North side King's Lynn in June 2008.

Budget cuts following King's Lynns's demotion to the Northern Premier League Premier Division in May 2009, resulted in Joachim not being offered fresh terms for the 2009–2010 season. Local reports in June 2009 linked him with a return Boston United. He briefly played as an amateur in the Leicestershire Senior League for Thurmaston Town at the start of the 2009–10 season, but a couple of weeks later he signed semi professional terms with Quorn. Joachim signed on for United Counties League Premier Division side Holbeach United for the 2010–11 season.

On 14 July 2011 Joachim, aged 36, re-signed for Boston United on non-contract basis. On 26 August 2011, after making just two appearances (one in the league), Joachim was released after failing to impress in his second spell with the Pilgrims.

In August 2013 Joachim, aged 38, came out of retirement and re-signed with United Counties League Premier Division side Holbeach United for the 2013–14 season. He made three appearances for the club (scoring once), before finishing the season with Oadby Town.

On 17 October 2014 Joachim signed for Midland League Premier Division side Shepshed Dynamo. He made 15 appearances for the club in all competitions.

In the 2015–16 season Joachim played for Holwell Sports in the East Midlands Counties League, scoring ten goals in 36 appearances in all competitions.

On 14 July 2016 Joachim signed for Newark Town. He scored eight goals in eleven games for the Blues, before finishing the 2016–17 season with Midland Football League side Montpellier.

At the start of the 2017–18 season Joachim signed for East Midlands Counties League side Radcliffe Olympic. He made 40 appearances for the club in all competitions, scoring four goals.

On 5 July 2018 Joachim signed for Nottinghamshire Senior League side Aslockton & Orston, scoring 33 goals in 39 appearances in all competitions. A year later, he joined Gibraltar National League side Europa Point as a player and advisor, as part of the club's collaboration with Player Trader. However, he departed the club in October without playing a game, joining Bourne Town that month.

== International career ==
Joachim starred in the England National Under-18 side that won the European U-18 Championships in 1993. He also had nine England Under-21 caps to his name before he was called up by St. Vincent and the Grenadines to represent them at senior level. However at that time, due to him playing for England at U21 level he was ineligible to play for the Caribbean team, only being informed of this upon arrival in St. Vincent for a World Cup qualifier in April 2000.

He was part of England's U20 squad that finished third at the 1993 FIFA World Youth Championship in Australia. He scored England's winning goal in their 2–1 third place play-off win over Australia at the Sydney Football Stadium.

== Honours ==
Leicester City

- Football League First Division play-offs: 1994

Aston Villa

- FA Cup runner-up: 1999–2000
