= Derbyshire County Football Association =

The Derbyshire County Football Association, simply known as the Derbyshire FA, is the governing body of football in the county of Derbyshire, England. The Derbyshire FA runs a number of cups at different levels for teams all across Derbyshire.

== Affiliated leagues ==
=== Men's Saturday ===
- Midlands Regional Alliance (1911)
- Derby Church League
- Hope Valley Amateur League (1907)
- Matlock and District League

=== Ladies and girls ===
Derbyshire Girls & Ladies League (2003)

=== Men's Sunday ===
- Alfreton and District Sunday League
- Chesterfield and District Sunday League (1966)
- Derby City League - Sunday Morning
- Derby Sunday League (1973) (formerly Derby Taverners)
- Long Eaton Sunday League (1970)

=== Small sided ===
- Match Night - Chesterfield Mondays
- Power Leagues
- Soccer Sixes - Chesterfield

=== Youth ===
- Derby City League - Saturday Youth
- Derby City League - Sunday Morning Youth
- Derby Mini-Soccer Lge (2005)
- Derwent Valley Junior League (1970)
- Rowsley and District Youth League

== Disbanded or amalgamated leagues ==
Leagues that were affiliated to the Derbyshire FA have disbanded or amalgamated with other leagues include:

- Long Eaton and District Church League

== Affiliated member clubs ==
Among the notable clubs that are affiliated to the Derbyshire FA are:

- Alfreton Town
- Ashbourne F.C.
- Belper Town
- Belper United
- Borrowash Victoria
- Buxton
- Chapel Town
- Chesterfield
- Derby County
- Glapwell
- Glossop North End
- Graham Street Prims
- Gresley Rovers
- Heanor Town
- Holbrook Sports
- Ilkeston Town
- Long Eaton United
- Matlock Town
- Mickleover
- New Mills
- Pinxton
- Sheffield
- Staveley Miners Welfare

== County Cups ==
Competition	Holders
Derbyshire Senior Challenge Cup	Buxton
