= Tony Thorpe =

English footballer (born 1974)

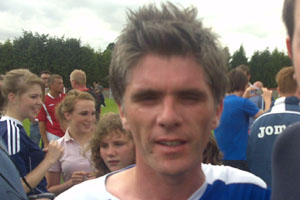

Personal information
- Full name: Anthony Thorpe
- Date of birth: 10 April 1974 (age 52)
- Place of birth: Leicester, England
- Height: 5 ft 9 in (1.75 m)
- Position: Striker

Team information
- Current team: Melton Town (manager)

Youth career
- 1990–1992: Leicester City

Senior career*
| Years | Team | Apps | (Gls) |
| 1992–1998 | Luton Town | 120 | (48) |
| 1998 | Fulham | 13 | (3) |
| 1998–2002 | Bristol City | 128 | (51) |
| 1998 | → Reading (loan) | 6 | (1) |
| 1998 | → Luton Town (loan) | 8 | (4) |
| 1999 | → Luton Town (loan) | 4 | (1) |
| 2002–2003 | Luton Town | 32 | (15) |
| 2003–2005 | Queens Park Rangers | 41 | (10) |
| 2005 | → Rotherham United (loan) | 5 | (1) |
| 2005–2006 | Swindon Town | 7 | (1) |
| 2006 | Colchester United | 14 | (0) |
| 2006–2007 | Stevenage Borough | 3 | (0) |
| 2006 | → Grimsby Town (loan) | 5 | (0) |
| 2007 | Grimsby Town | 1 | (0) |
| 2007 | Tamworth | 7 | (1) |
| 2007 | Barton Rovers | ? | |
| 2008 | Woking | 1 | (0) |
| 2008 | Brackley Town | 9 | (4) |
| 2008–2009 | Stamford | 12 | (7) |
| 2009–2011 | Halesowen Town | 0 | (0) |
| 2011 | Hinckley | | |
| 2011 | Thurmaston Town | 4 | (2) |
| 2012 | Melton Town | 16 | (18) |
| Total | | 436 | (167) |

Managerial career
- 2010–2011: Halesowen Town
- 2016: Melton Town
- * Club domestic league appearances and goals as of 20:14, 18 December 2009 (UTC)

Anthony Thorpe (born 10 April 1974) is an English former professional footballer and former manager of Melton Town

As a player he was a striker. He notably played for Luton Town, Bristol City and Queens Park Rangers. He also played in the Football League for Reading, Rotherham United, Swindon Town, Colchester United and Grimsby Town. In the Non-League game he has previously appeared for Stevenage Borough, Tamworth, Barton Rovers, Woking, Brackley Town, Stamford and Halesowen Town, where he also had a brief spell as player/manager. Saturday 8 th February 2025 prolific TT Tony Thorpe made his debut appearance for Wigston Willow vets at the age of 50. Scoring on his debut and playing in a 7-0 victory.

== Career ==
Thorpe began his career at Leicester City, but he was transferred to Luton Town in August 1992. During his time at Luton he switched from attacking-midfielder to striker, with outstanding success. He scored 28 league goals in the 1996–97 season, and soon a move to Fulham was completed. His time at Craven Cottage was short and he joined Bristol City in the summer of 1998. He took time to adapt as Ashton Gate, and he was then sent out on loan to Reading and back to Luton twice. He eventually found form in Bristol, before he re-joined Luton on a Bosman free transfer in 2002.

After 13 goals in his first season back, Thorpe left the club for Queens Park Rangers for a cut-price £50,000 fee, provoking outrage from many Luton fans. He scored 10 goals in his first season at QPR, helping them win promotion to the newly formed Football League Championship, but the next season was loaned to relegation strugglers Rotherham United. He was then released by QPR, and joined Swindon Town, along with another ex-QPR striker, Jamie Cureton.

His time at Swindon was unsuccessful, and he was allowed to join fellow League One side Colchester United. After their promotion to the Championship, Thorpe was released and he move to Stevenage Borough in July 2006. However, he struggled to settle there, and he was sent to Grimsby Town on loan in September 2006, and he signed for the Mariners in January 2007.

Thorpe was released from Grimsby Town at the end of the 2006–07 season and went on to join Conference North team Tamworth, while signing on for Sunday league side Hockley Rangers in Leicester's Alliance League.

On 1 November 2007, Thorpe left Tamworth by mutual consent, after an eye condition prevented him from playing. The eye was injured when he scratched the eye on a tile while working, and his vision deteriorated with little sign of improvement. However, he went on to sign for Barton Rovers later in the month.

He signed for Woking on 1 September 2008 but was released after just one game following the dismissal of the club's manager. On 4 September 2008 he signed for Brackley Town.

It was announced in late November 2008, that due to new job commitments, Brackley Town and Tony Thorpe came to a mutual agreement for him to move on, as he was unable to find the time commitment needed. He signed for Stamford in December 2008. He remained with Stamford until May 2009, where he then became a free agent until signing for Halesowen Town in December 2009. He was appointed player/manager of Halesowen in November 2010, but resigned in January 2011. He then resumed his playing career at Hinckley in the East Midlands Counties League.

== Honours ==
Bristol City

- Football League Trophy runner-up: 1999–2000

Queens Park Rangers

- Football League Second Division second-place promotion: 2003–04

Colchester United

- Football League One second-place promotion: 2005–06

Individual

- PFA Team of the Year: 1996–97 Second Division
