= 2018–19 Midland Football League =

The 2018–19 Midland Football League season was the 5th in the history of the Midland Football League, a football competition in England. The provisional club allocations for steps 5 and 6 were announced by the FA on 25 May.

== Premier Division ==
Midland Football League Premier Division
- Season: 2018–19
- Champions: Ilkeston Town
- Promoted: Ilkeston Town
- Relegated: Dunkirk; Wolverhampton Sporting Community
- Matches: 380
- Goals: 1,214 (3.19 per match)

The Premier Division featured 15 clubs which competed in the previous season, along with five new clubs:

- Dunkirk, promoted from the East Midlands Counties League
- Ilkeston Town, promoted from Division One
- Romulus, from the Northern Premier League
- Walsall Wood, promoted from Division One
- Wolverhampton Sporting, promoted from the West Midlands (Regional) League

=== League table ===
Pos	Team	Pld	W	D	L	GF	GA	GD	Pts	Promotion or relegation
1	Ilkeston Town	38	25	4	9	93	50	+43	79	Promoted to the Northern Premier League Division One South East
2	Walsall Wood	38	24	7	7	67	32	+35	79	
3	Sporting Khalsa	38	20	7	11	61	44	+17	67	
4	Westfields	38	17	12	9	73	48	+25	63	Transferred to the Hellenic League
5	Boldmere St Michaels	38	17	8	13	65	66	−1	59	
6	Quorn	38	16	10	12	74	61	+13	58	Transferred to the United Counties League
7	Shepshed Dynamo	38	17	6	15	68	64	+4	57	Transferred to the United Counties League
8	Coventry United	38	16	8	14	52	47	+5	56	
9	Coventry Sphinx	38	16	8	14	61	57	+4	56	
10	Lye Town	38	14	10	14	65	52	+13	52	
11	Worcester City	38	14	10	14	66	61	+5	52	
12	AFC Wulfrunians	38	14	9	15	53	54	−1	51	
13	Stourport Swifts	38	14	9	15	53	55	−2	51	
14	Highgate United	38	13	12	13	49	55	−6	51	
15	Long Eaton United	38	14	8	16	59	61	−2	50	
16	South Normanton Athletic	38	13	6	19	52	48	+4	45	
17	Romulus	38	12	8	18	53	68	−15	44	
18	Loughborough University	38	10	9	19	58	79	−21	39	Transferred to the United Counties League
19	Dunkirk	38	6	7	25	40	102	−62	25	Relegated to the East Midlands Counties League
20	Wolverhampton Sporting	38	5	8	25	52	110	−58	23	Relegated to the West Midlands (Regional) League

Source: FA Full-Time
Rules for classification: 1) Points; 2) Goal difference; 3) Number of goals scored; 4) Number of matches won; 5) Head-to-head results

=== Stadia and locations ===
Location of the Premier Division clubs

Club	Stadium	Capacity
AFC Wulfrunians	Castlecroft Stadium	2,000
Boldmere St. Michaels	Trevor Brown Memorial Ground	2,500
Coventry Sphinx	Sphinx Drive	1,000
Coventry United	Butts Park Arena	3,000
Dunkirk	Ron Steel Sports Ground	1,500
Highgate United	The Coppice	2,000
Ilkeston Town	New Manor Ground	3,029
Long Eaton United	Grange Park	3,000
Loughborough University	Loughborough University Stadium	3,300
Lye Town	The Sports Ground	1,000
Quorn	Sutton Park	1,400
Romulus	The Central Ground	2,000
Shepshed Dynamo	The Dovecote Stadium	2,500
South Normanton Athletic	Lees Lane	3,000
Sporting Khalsa	Aspray Arena	2,500
Stourport Swifts	Walshes Meadow	2,000
Walsall Wood	The ML Safety Stadium	
Westfields	allpay.park	2,000
Wolverhampton Sporting	Pride Park	
Worcester City	Victoria Ground	3,500

== Division One ==
Midland Football League Division One
- Season: 2018–19
- Champions: Heather St John's
- Promoted: Heather St John's; Racing Club Warwick
- Matches: 342
- Goals: 1,299 (3.8 per match)

Division One featured 16 clubs which competed in the previous season, along with three new clubs:

- NKF Burbage, promoted from Division Two
- Rocester, relegated from the Premier Division
- Stapenhill, transferred from the East Midlands Counties League

Also, Smithswood Firs were initially promoted to this division but dissolved.

=== League table ===
Pos	Team	Pld	W	D	L	GF	GA	GD	Pts	Promotion or relegation
1	Heather St John's	36	30	3	3	135	43	+92	93	Promoted to the Premier Division
2	Racing Club Warwick	36	27	4	5	119	46	+73	85	Promoted to the Premier Division
3	Atherstone Town	36	26	5	5	98	33	+65	83	
4	Lichfield City	36	24	2	10	107	59	+48	74	
5	Leicester Road	35	23	3	9	91	32	+59	72	
6	NKF Burbage	36	18	7	11	71	56	+15	61	
7	Uttoxeter Town	36	17	5	14	68	56	+12	56	
8	Cadbury Athletic	36	15	9	12	53	50	+3	54	
9	Studley	35	14	9	12	63	46	+17	51	
10	Paget Rangers	36	14	7	15	61	66	−5	49	
11	Brocton	36	14	6	16	73	79	−6	48	
12	Chelmsley Town	36	11	6	19	59	67	−8	39	
13	Stapenhill	36	10	7	19	49	96	−47	37	
14	Rocester	36	10	5	21	49	79	−30	35	
15	Coventry Copsewood	36	9	8	19	51	90	−39	35	
16	Hinckley	36	8	10	18	46	69	−23	34	
17	Littleton	36	6	5	25	43	94	−51	23	Transferred to the West Midlands (Regional) League
18	Heath Hayes	36	6	4	26	30	111	−81	22	Reprieved from relegation
19	Nuneaton Griff	36	4	5	27	33	127	−94	17	Reprieved from relegation

Source: FA Full-Time
Rules for classification: 1) Points; 2) Goal difference; 3) Number of goals scored; 4) Number of matches won; 5) Head-to-head results

=== Stadia and locations ===
Location of Division One clubs

Club	Stadium	Capacity
Atherstone Town	Sheepy Road	3,500
Brocton	Silkmore Lane	
Cadbury Athletic	Triplex Sports Ground	
Chelmsley Town	Pack Meadow	
Coventry Copsewood	Allard Way	2,000
Heath Hayes	Coppice Colliery Ground	
Heather St John's	St. John's Park	
Hinckley	Miners Welfare Ground	
Leicester Road	Leicester Road Stadium	4,329
Lichfield City	City Ground	1,500
Littleton	Five Acres	
NKF Burbage	Kirkby Road	
Nuneaton Griff	The Pingles Stadium	6,000
Paget Rangers	Coles Lane	2,000
Racing Club Warwick	Townsend Meadow	1,280
Rocester	Hillsfield	4,000
Stapenhill	Edge Hill	1,500
Studley	The Beehive	1,500
Uttoxeter Town	Oldfields	

== Division Two ==
Midland Football League Division Two
- Season: 2018–19
- Champions: Northfield Town
- Promoted: GNP Sports
- Matches: 240
- Goals: 1,026 (4.28 per match)

Division Two featured ten clubs which competed in the division last season, along with six new clubs:

- Bolehall Swifts, relegated from Division One
- Coventry Alvis, relegated from Division One
- Lane Head
- GNP Sports, promoted from Division Three
- Boldmere Sports & Social Falcon, promoted from Division Three
- FC Stratford, promoted from Division Three

=== League table ===
Pos	Team	Pld	W	D	L	GF	GA	GD	Pts	Promotion or relegation
1	Northfield Town	30	23	4	3	80	30	+50	73	
2	GNP Sports	30	22	4	4	97	34	+63	70	Promoted to Division One
3	Boldmere Sports & Social Falcon	30	21	5	4	77	34	+43	68	
4	Moors Academy	30	20	5	5	105	40	+65	65	
5	Fairfield Villa	30	17	3	10	87	65	+22	54	
6	Coton Green	30	15	4	11	60	56	+4	49	
7	Coventry Alvis	30	13	6	11	68	68	0	45	
8	Knowle	30	12	6	12	69	46	+23	42	
9	Barnt Green Spartak	30	11	3	16	52	89	−37	36	
10	Lane Head	30	10	5	15	52	64	−12	35	
11	Feckenham	30	9	5	16	54	69	−15	32	
12	Redditch Borough	30	10	2	18	52	78	−26	32	
13	Hampton	30	8	7	15	55	92	−37	31	
14	FC Stratford	30	7	1	22	50	93	−43	22	
15	Bolehall Swifts	30	5	2	23	32	88	−56	17	
16	Earlswood Town	30	4	4	22	36	80	−44	16	

Source: fchd

== Division Three ==
Midland Football League Division Three
- Season: 2018–19
- Champions: Alcester Town
- Promoted: Alcester Town

Division Three featured 13 clubs which competed in the division last season, along with 3 new clubs:

- AFC Church
- Coventry Plumbing, joined from Coventry Alliance
- WLV Sport

=== League table ===
Pos	Team	Pld	W	D	L	GF	GA	GD	Pts	Promotion or relegation
1	Alcester Town	30	23	5	2	104	23	+81	71 (Note: Alcester Town 3 points deducted.)	Promoted to Division Two
2	Continental Star	30	22	2	6	109	61	+48	68	
3	AFC Solihull	30	20	6	4	78	42	+36	66	
4	Coventry Plumbing	30	19	4	7	86	45	+41	61	
5	Inkberrow	30	19	4	7	64	35	+29	61	
6	Bartestree	30	15	7	8	76	32	+44	52	Transferred to the Herefordshire County FA League
7	Coventrians	30	14	5	11	70	65	+5	47	
8	Central Ajax	30	13	5	12	73	66	+7	44	
9	Enville Athletic	30	13	4	13	50	57	−7	43	
10	WLV Sport	30	8	8	14	50	66	−16	32	
11	FC Shush	30	8	4	18	66	91	−25	28	
12	AFC Church	30	7	6	17	49	70	−21	27	Resigned from the league
13	Shipston Excelsior	30	5	6	19	41	89	−48	21	
14	Castle Vale Town	30	6	6	18	54	127	−73	21 (Note: Castle Vale Town 3 points deducted.)	
15	Leamington Hibs	30	4	5	21	33	81	−48	17	
16	Birmingham Tigers	30	5	1	24	34	87	−53	16	

Source: fchd
Rules for classification: 1) points; 2) goal difference; 3) number of goals scored.
