= 2010–11 Midland Football Alliance =

Midland Football Alliance
- Season: 2010–11
- Champions: Coalville Town
- Promoted: Coalville Town
- Relegated: Oadby Town; Malvern Town
- Matches: 506
- Goals: 1,778 (3.51 per match)

The 2010–11 Midland Football Alliance season was the 17th in the history of Midland Football Alliance, a football competition in England.

== Clubs and League table ==
The league featured 19 clubs from the previous season, along with four new clubs:

- Dunkirk, promoted from the East Midlands Counties League
- Ellesmere Rangers, promoted from the West Midlands (Regional) League
- Heath Hayes, promoted from the Midland Football Combination
- Willenhall Town, relegated from the Northern Premier League

=== League Table ===
Pos	Team	Pld	W	D	L	GF	GA	GD	Pts	Promotion or relegation
1	Coalville Town	44	32	4	8	153	53	+100	100	Promoted to the Northern Premier League Division One South
2	Tipton Town	44	31	7	6	101	32	+69	100	
3	Boldmere St. Michaels	44	26	10	8	86	33	+53	88	
4	Loughborough University	44	27	7	10	77	36	+41	88	
5	Stratford Town	44	26	8	10	92	48	+44	86	
6	Westfields	44	24	13	7	102	54	+48	85	
7	Studley	44	25	10	9	81	49	+32	85	
8	Dunkirk	44	25	9	10	104	67	+37	84	
9	Kirby Muxloe	44	25	7	12	89	58	+31	82	
10	Causeway United	44	26	2	16	85	59	+26	80	
11	Heath Hayes	44	20	11	13	84	83	+1	71	
12	Coleshill Town	44	18	11	15	67	55	+12	65	
13	Ellesmere Rangers	44	16	9	19	79	73	+6	57	
14	Rocester	44	16	5	23	57	73	−16	53	
15	Bridgnorth Town	44	14	6	24	61	84	−23	48	
16	Coventry Sphinx	44	12	9	23	66	75	−9	45	
17	Biddulph Victoria	44	12	6	26	63	81	−18	42	Club folded
18	Highgate United	44	10	9	25	59	104	−45	39	
19	Friar Lane & Epworth	44	10	3	31	69	117	−48	33	Resigned to the Leicestershire Senior League
20	Alvechurch	44	8	7	29	47	119	−72	31	
21	Willenhall Town	44	8	6	30	63	149	−86	29 (Note: Willenhall Town deducted 1 point.)	
22	Oadby Town	44	5	7	32	55	129	−74	22	Relegated to the East Midlands Counties League
23	Malvern Town	44	4	6	34	38	147	−109	18	Relegated to the West Midlands (Regional) League

Source: fchd
Rules for classification: 1) points; 2) goal difference; 3) number of goals scored.
