= East Midlands Counties Football League =

10th level association football league in England

- Founded: 2008
- Folded: 2021
- Country: England
- Number of clubs: 20
- Level on pyramid: 10
- Promotion to: Midland League Premier Division; Northern Counties East League Premier Division; United Counties League Premier Division
- Relegation to: Central Midlands League South Division; Leicestershire Senior League Premier Division; Nottinghamshire Senior League Premier Division
- Domestic cup(s): National; FA Cup; FA Vase; League; League Cup
- Last champions: Selston F.C. (2018–19)

The East Midlands Counties Football League was an English football league that operated from 2008 to 2021, covering the counties of Derbyshire, Leicestershire and Nottinghamshire in the East Midlands. The league had one division, which stood at the tenth level of the football pyramid.

== History ==
The league was formed in 2008, drawing clubs from the Northern Counties East League (2), Central Midlands League (8) and Leicestershire Senior League (8) to create a division at level 10 of the English football league system.

On 15 May 2008 The FA Leagues Committee placed the new league at Step 6 in the National League System. Eighteen clubs were invited to form the new league;

- From the Central Midlands League: Blackwell Miners Welfare, Dunkirk, Gedling Miners Welfare, Graham Street Prims, Greenwood Meadows, Heanor Town, Holbrook Miners Welfare, Radford;
- From the Leicestershire Senior League: Bardon Hill, Barrow Town, Ellistown, Hinckley Downes, Holwell Sports, Ibstock United, Kirby Muxloe SC, St. Andrews;
- From the Northern Counties East League: Borrowash Victoria, Gedling Town

The league provided a pathway for successful clubs to higher grade football, with clubs moving up to the Midland League Premier Division, Northern Counties East League Premier Division and United Counties League Premier Division - each at level 9 of the system.

It was not until 2017 that clubs were relegated from the competition, into the Central Midlands League and Leicestershire Senior League.

The competition had several feeder leagues at level 11 of the pyramid:

- Central Midlands League South Division
- Leicestershire Senior League Premier Division
- Nottinghamshire Senior League Premier Division

Clubs were also liable to be transferred to other leagues if the FA deemed it geographically suitable to do so.

The East Midlands Counties League was disbanded at the end of the 2020–21 season, most of its remaining clubs were assigned to the Northern Counties East and United Counties leagues' Step 6 divisions, as part of reorganising the National League System where the United Counties League added an additional Step 5 division.

== Final clubs (2020–21) ==
Club	Home ground
Barrow Town	Riverside Park
Belper United	Christchurch Meadow
Borrowash Victoria	Asterdale Bowl
Clifton All Whites	Norman Archer Memorial Ground
Clipstone	Lido Ground
Dunkirk	Ron Steel Sports Ground
Eastwood	Coronation Park
Gedling Miners Welfare	Plains Social Club
Graham Street Prims	Asterdale Sports Ground
Heanor Town	Town Ground
Hucknall Town	Watnall Road
Ingles	Dovecote Stadium
Kimberley Miners Welfare	The Stag Ground
Ollerton Town	Walesby Lane Sports Ground
Radford	Selhurst Street
Rainworth Miners Welfare	Welfare Ground
Sherwood Colliery	Debdale Park
Shirebrook Town	Langwith Road
Teversal	Teversal Grange Sports and Social Centre
West Bridgford	Regatta Way Sports Ground

== Honours ==
=== Champions ===
Season	
2008–09	Kirby Muxloe
2009–10	Dunkirk
2010–11	Gresley
2011–12	Heanor Town
2012–13	Basford United
2013–14	Thurnby Nirvana
2014–15	Bardon Hill
2015–16	St Andrews
2016–17	West Bridgford
2017-18	Dunkirk
2018-19	Selston
2019-20	None, seasons abandoned **
2020–21	None, seasons abandoned **

- As a result of the COVID-19 pandemic, the 2019–20 season's competition was formally abandoned on 26 March 2020, with all results from the season being expunged, and no promotion or relegation taking place to or from the competition. The next season was also abandoned on 24 February 2021 but promotion proceeded after a one-year postponement.

==== Promoted ====
Season	Club	Position	Promoted to
2008–09	Kirby Muxloe	1st	Midland Alliance
2009–10	Dunkirk	1st	Midland Alliance
2010–11	Gresley	1st	Midland Alliance
2011–12	Heanor Town	1st	Northern Counties East League Premier Division
2012–13	Basford United	1st	Northern Counties East League Premier Division
2013–14	Thurnby Nirvana	1st	United Counties League Premier Division
2014–15	Bardon Hill	1st	Midland League Premier Division
2015–16	St Andrews	1st	Midland League Premier Division
2016–17	South Normanton Athletic	2nd	Midland League Premier Division
2017–18	Dunkirk	1st	Midland League Premier Division
2018–19	Selston; Newark Flowserve	1st 2nd	Midland League Premier Division
2019–20	no promotion, season abandoned**		
2020–21	Eastwood; Heanor Town; Sherwood Colliery	Top 3*	Eastwood, Heanor: United Countied League Premier Division North; Sherwood: Northern Counties East League Premier Division

- * Based on points-per-game averages obtained by adding the accumulated number of games played between 2019 and 2021, and dividing it by total number of points.
- ** As a result of the COVID-19 pandemic, the 2019–20 season's competition was formally abandoned on 26 March 2020, with all results from the season being expunged, and no promotion or relegation taking place to or from the competition.

== League Cup ==
The league also ran the East Midlands Counties League Cup, which was contested by every club in the league.

=== Finals ===
Season	Winner	Result	Runner-up	Venue
2008–09	Borrowash Victoria	1 – 0	Holbrook Miners Welfare	Welby Road, Holwell Sports F.C.
2009–10	Gedling Town	2 - 1*	Dunkirk	Borrowash Road, Borrowash Victoria F.C.
2010–11	Thurnby Nirvana	4 - 2	Holbrook Sports	Moat Ground, Gresley F.C.
2011–12	Borrowash Victoria	1 - 0	Radcliffe Olympic	Riverside Park, Barrow Town F.C.
2012–13	Basford United	2 - 0	Graham Street Prims	Borrowash Road, Borrowash Victoria F.C.
2013–14	Graham Street Prims	4 - 2	Sutton Town AFC	Bardon Close, Bardon Hill F.C.
2014–15	South Normanton Athletic	1 - 1* (5–4)(p)	Radcliffe Olympic	Plains Road, Gedling Miners Welfare F.C.
2015–16	Aylestone Park	2 - 1	South Normanton Athletic	Riverside Park, Barrow Town F.C.
2016–17	Dunkirk	2 - 1	Ashby Ivanhoe	Cropston Road, Anstey Nomads F.C.
2017–18	Radford	6 - 0	Anstey Nomads	Coronation Park, Eastwood C.F.C.
2018–19	Newark Flowserve	0 - 0* (4-1)(p)	Clifton All Whites	Lido Ground, Clipstone F.C.
2019–20	Competition abandoned**			
2020–21	Not held			

- * Result after extra-time
- ** As a result of the COVID-19 pandemic, the 2019–20 season's competition was formally abandoned on 26 March 2020, with all results from the season being expunged.
