= 2007–08 Northern Counties East Football League =

The 2007–08 Northern Counties East Football League season was the 26th in the history of Northern Counties East Football League, a football competition in England.

== Premier Division ==
Northern Counties East Football League Premier Division
- Season: 2007–08
- Champions: Winterton Rangers
- Promoted: Glapwell
- Relegated: Glasshoughton Welfare
- Matches: 380
- Goals: 1,278 (3.36 per match)

The Premier Division featured 15 clubs which competed in the previous season, along with five new clubs, promoted from Division One:

- Lincoln Moorlands, who also merged with Lincoln League club Lincoln Railway to form Lincoln Moorlands Railway
- Nostell Miners Welfare
- Parkgate
- South Normanton Athletic
- Winterton Rangers

=== League table ===
Pos	Team	Pld	W	D	L	GF	GA	GD	Pts	Promotion or relegation
1	Winterton Rangers	38	29	4	5	116	37	+79	91	
2	Glapwell	38	23	9	6	86	38	+48	78	Promoted to the Northern Premier League Division One South
3	Pickering Town	38	22	7	9	68	42	+26	73	
4	Liversedge	38	20	8	10	73	41	+32	68	
5	Nostell Miners Welfare	38	19	7	12	81	64	+17	64	
6	Hallam	38	19	5	14	82	69	+13	62	
7	Selby Town	38	16	12	10	76	52	+24	60	
8	Parkgate	38	18	4	16	80	54	+26	58	
9	Armthorpe Welfare	38	17	7	14	73	69	+4	58	
10	Arnold Town	38	16	9	13	54	48	+6	57	
11	Eccleshill United	38	15	5	18	57	74	−17	50	
12	Long Eaton United	38	14	7	17	48	63	−15	49	
13	Brodsworth Welfare	38	14	5	19	61	91	−30	45 (Note: Brodsworth Welfare were deducted 2 points.)	
14	Mickleover Sports	38	11	10	17	58	78	−20	43	
15	Shirebrook Town	38	11	9	18	38	63	−25	42	
16	Thackley	38	11	7	20	54	75	−21	40	
17	South Normanton Athletic	38	10	10	18	42	64	−22	37 (Note: South Normanton Athletic were deducted 3 points.)	Club folded
18	Maltby Main	38	9	9	20	52	72	−20	36	
19	Lincoln Moorlands Railway	38	9	6	23	53	83	−30	33	
20	Glasshoughton Welfare	38	4	6	28	26	101	−75	18	Relegated to Division One

Source: fchd
Rules for classification: 1) points; 2) goal difference; 3) number of goals scored.

== Division One ==
Northern Counties East Football League Division One
- Season: 2007–08
- Champions: Dinnington Town
- Promoted: Dinnington Town; Hall Road Rangers
- Matches: 272
- Goals: 990 (3.64 per match)

Division One featured 12 clubs which competed in the previous season, along with five clubs.

- Clubs joined from the Central Midlands League:
  - Barton Town Old Boys
  - Bottesford Town
  - Rainworth Miners Welfare
- Plus:
  - Leeds Met Carnegie, joined from the West Yorkshire League
  - Scarborough Athletic, new club formed after Conference North club Scarborough folded.

=== League table ===
Pos	Team	Pld	W	D	L	GF	GA	GD	Pts	Promotion or relegation
1	Dinnington Town	32	24	6	2	88	40	+48	78	Promoted to the Premier Division
2	Hall Road Rangers	32	22	1	9	65	42	+23	67	Promoted to the Premier Division
3	Bottesford Town	32	19	5	8	62	40	+22	62	
4	Rainworth Miners Welfare	32	16	9	7	60	38	+22	57	
5	Scarborough Athletic	32	18	7	7	80	45	+35	55 (Note: Scarborough Athletic were deducted 6 points.)	
6	Gedling Town	32	16	7	9	70	45	+25	55	Transferred to the East Midlands Counties League
7	Leeds Met Carnegie	32	17	4	11	67	45	+22	55	
8	Staveley Miners Welfare	32	14	4	14	49	53	−4	46	
9	Barton Town Old Boys	32	13	9	10	82	62	+20	45 (Note: Barton Town Old Boys were deducted 3 points.)	
10	Teversal	32	10	12	10	58	66	−8	42	
11	AFC Emley	32	10	8	14	59	66	−7	38	
12	Tadcaster Albion	32	9	7	16	48	66	−18	34	
13	Borrowash Victoria	32	8	6	18	49	76	−27	30	Transferred to the East Midlands Counties League
14	Yorkshire Amateur	32	7	8	17	37	67	−30	29	
15	Worsbrough Bridge Athletic	32	7	6	19	40	67	−27	27	
16	Rossington Main	32	7	3	22	47	87	−40	24	
17	Pontefract Collieries	32	1	6	25	29	85	−56	9	

Source: fchd
Rules for classification: 1) points; 2) goal difference; 3) number of goals scored.
