= Birstall United F.C. =

Association football club in England

Coordinates: 52°40′51.16″N 1°06′53.13″W

Birstall United
- Full name: Birstall United Football Club
- Founded: 1961
- Ground: Meadow Lane, Birstall
- Chairman: Paul Blake-Smith
- Manager: James Dodd
- League: Midland League Division One
- 2025–26: Midland League Division One, 7th of 21
Home colours

Birstall United Football Club is a football club based in Birstall, near Leicester, in Leicestershire, England. The club are currently members of the Midland League Division One.

== History ==
The club was established in 1961, and initially played Sunday league football in the Leicester & District League. After winning three championships and the Leicestershire Sunday Intermediate Cup, they switched to Saturday football, joining the Leicester Mutual League. They won divisions five, four and three in consecutive seasons, before winning Division One in 1972–73. They retained the league title the following season, also winning the Leicester Junior Cup South with a 4–0 win over Oadby '67.

After winning a third Division One title in 1975–76, Birstall joined Division Two of the Leicestershire Senior League in 1976. Their first season in the Senior League saw them win the Division Two title and the Tebbutt Brown Cup, beating Division Two runners-up Hillcroft 3–0 in a replay after a 1–1 draw. Promoted to the Division One, Birstall finished as runners-up in 1981–82, a season in which they also won the Tebbutt Brown Cup, beating league champions Anstey Nomads 1–0 in the final. The two met in the Tebbutt Brown Cup final again in 1984–85, with Birstall winning 3–2.

In 1993–94 Birstall won the league's Floodlight Cup. The 1995–96 season saw them win the Leicestershire and Rutland Senior Cup with a 1–0 win over Oadby Town in the final. They won the cup again in 1997–98, defeating Ibstock Welfare on 4–3 penalties following a 1–1 draw, and retained it the following season, beating Oadby Town 2–0 on penalties after a 2–2 draw; the season also saw them finish as runners-up in the (now renamed) Premier Division. After winning the Premier Division in 2015–16, the club were promoted to the East Midlands Counties League.

At the end of the 2017–18 season, Birstall were transferred to Division One of the United Counties League. The club were runners-up in Division One in 2022–23, qualifying for the promotion play-offs. Following a 3–2 win over Newark Town in the semi-finals, they lost the final against Hucknall Town 5–3 on penalties after the game ended in a 1–1 draw. At the end of the 2023–24 season the club were transferred to Division One of the Midland League. The club won the Leicestershire and Rutland Senior Cup in 2024–25, beating Heather St John's on penalties in the final.

== Honours ==
- Leicestershire Senior League
  - Premier Division champions 2015–16
  - Division Two champions 1976–77
  - Tebbutt Brown Cup winners 1976–77, 1981–82, 1984–85
  - Floodlit Cup winners 1993–94
- Leicester Mutual League
  - Division One champions 1972–73, 1973–74, 1975–76
- Leicestershire and Rutland Senior Cup
  - Winners 1995–96, 1997–98, 1998–99, 2024–25

== Records ==
- Best FA Cup performance: Preliminary round, 2017–18
- Best FA Vase performance: Fourth round, 1997–98

== See also ==
- Birstall United F.C. players
