= Leicester Nirvana F.C. =

Association football club in England

Coordinates: 52°38′10.590″N 1°3′27.968″W

Leicester Nirvana
- Full name: Leicester Nirvana Football Club
- Founded: 2008
- Ground: Hamilton Park, Leicester
- Manager: Nick Brett
- League: United Counties League Premier Division South
- 2024–25: United Counties League Premier Division South, 10th of 19
- Website: leicesternirvana.com
Home colours

Leicester Nirvana Football Club is a football club based in the Hamilton area of Leicester in Leicestershire. Formed in 2008 by a merger of Thurnby Rangers and Leicester Nirvana and initially known as Thurnby Nirvana, they are currently members of the United Counties League Premier Division South and play at Hamilton Park.

== History ==
=== Thurnby Rangers ===
Thurnby Rangers were established as a Sunday league team and played at Dakyn Road in Leicester. They won the Charnwood Sunday League Premier Division in 1988–89 and went on to win the title in each of the next three seasons. After finishing as runners-up in 1992–93, the club switched to Saturday football, joined Division One of the Leicester & District League. They won the division at the first attempt and were promoted to the Premier Division. The following season saw them win the Premier Division title, earning promotion to Division One of the Leicestershire Senior League.

Thurnby won the Division One title and the Leicestershire & Rutland Saturday Shield in 1995–96, but were unable to take promotion to the Premier Division. They were runners-up the following season, and after winning Division One again in 2000–01, the club were promoted to the Premier Division. They won the League Cup and the Leicestershire and Rutland Senior Cup in 2001–02 and were Premier Division champions in 2004–05. The following season saw them win the Leicestershire and Rutland Senior Cup again.

=== Leicester Nirvana ===
FC Nirvana were established the mid-1980s, having grown out of the Red Star youth group, and played at Victoria Park. The club joined Division One of the Mutual League in 1984 and were runners-up in their first season, earning promotion to the Premier Division. They won the Premier Division title in 1986–87 and were runners-up the following season. After finish third in 1988–89 the club moved up to Division One of the Central Midlands League and were renamed Leicester Nirvana. They were Division One runners-up in their first season in their first season in the league. The following season saw the club resign mid-season; however, they were allowed to rejoin the league for the 1991–92 season, which saw them placed in the Premier Division South. The club left the league at the end of the season, having decided to focus on youth football.

=== Merged club ===
In 2008 Thurnby Rangers and Leicester Nirvana merged to form Thurnby Nirvana, retaining Rangers' place in the Premier Division of the Leicestershire Senior League, although Leicester Nirvana continued as a youth club. In 2009–10 they finished third in the Premier Division and were promoted to the East Midlands Counties League. The club won the League Cup in 2010–11 and the league title in 2013–14, earning promotion to the Premier Division of the United Counties League. They were runners-up in the Premier Division the following season. At the end of the season the club were renamed Leicester Nirvana. They were Premier Division runners-up again in 2015–16, missing out on the title on goal difference.

League reorganisation saw the Premier Division split in 2021, with Nirvana becoming members of the Premier Division North. At the end of the 2022–23 season they were transferred to the Premier Division South.

== Ground ==
The merged club initially played at Thurnby's Daykn Road ground. In 2015 they began groundsharing at Highfield Rangers' Gleneagles Avenue, before moving to Nirvana's Hamilton Park in December 2016 after it was upgraded to meet ground grading requirements.

== Honours ==
- East Midlands Counties League
  - Champions 2013–14
  - League Cup winners 2010–11

== Records ==
- Best FA Cup performance: First qualifying round, 2011–12, 2012–13
- Best FA Vase performance: Fifth round, 2018–19

== See also ==
- Leicester Nirvana F.C. players
