= Melton Town F.C. =

Association football club in England

Coordinates: 52.755393°N 0.87397903°W

Melton Town
- Full name: Melton Town Football Club
- Nickname: The Reds
- Founded: 2004
- Ground: Melton Sports Village, Melton Mowbray
- Chairman: Matt Curtis
- Manager: Tom Manship
- League: United Counties League Premier Division North
- 2025–26: United Counties League Premier Division North, 12th of 20 (resigned)
Home colours

Melton Town Football Club is a football club based in Melton Mowbray, Leicestershire, England. They are currently members of the United Counties League Premier Division North and play at the Melton Sports Village

== History ==
The club was established in 2004 and joined Division Two of the Leicester & District League. In 2006–07 season they were Division Two champions, and were promoted to Division One. In 2009 they moved up to Division One of the Leicestershire Senior League. After finishing as runners-up in 2012–13, the club were promoted to the Premier Division. They went on to finish as runners-up in the Premier Division in 2013–14 and 2014–15, but were unable to take promotion due to failing ground grading regulations. A third-place finish in 2015–16 and a move to a new ground saw the club promoted to Division One of the United Counties League, with the club also being renamed Melton Town.

In 2021 Melton were promoted to the Premier Division North based on their results in the abandoned 2019–20 and 2020–21 seasons. They finished fourth in the Premier Division North in 2023–24, qualifying for the promotion play-offs, in which they lost 1–0 to Loughborough Students in the semi-finals.

== Ground ==
In 2013 the club moved to nearby Asfordby. They returned to Melton Mowbray in April 2016 when the club moved to the Melton Sports Village. The new ground included a 135-seat stand. In autumn 2021 an artificial pitch was installed.

== Honours ==
- Leicester & District League
  - Division Two champions 2006–07

== Records ==
- Best FA Cup performance: First qualifying round, 2024–25
- Best FA Vase performance: Third round, 2024–25

== See also ==
- Melton Town F.C. players
- Melton Town F.C. managers
