= Kirby Muxloe F.C. =

Association football club in England

Coordinates: 52°38′28.61″N 1°13′48.07″W

Kirby Muxloe
- Full name: Kirby Muxloe Football Club
- Founded: 1910
- Ground: Ratby Lane, Kirby Muxloe
- Chairman: Scott Carpenter
- Manager: Dan Barber
- League: Midland League Division One
- 2024–25: Midland League Division One, 6th of 22
Home colours	Away colours

Kirby Muxloe Football Club is a football club based in Kirby Muxloe, Leicestershire, England. They are currently members of the Midland League Division One and play at Ratby Lane.

== History ==
The club was established in 1910. They played in the Leicester Mutual League, and were relegated from Division Two to Division Three in 1972–73. They were promoted back to Division Two in 1974–75, and were renamed Kirby Muxloe Sports and Village Club in 1975 after merging with the local cricket club. The following season saw them promoted to Division One. In 1977 the club joined the Premier Division of the Leicester City League, where they played until joining Division Two of the Leicestershire Senior League in 1982. The following year Division Two was renamed Division One.

A third-place finish in Division One in 1986–87 saw Kirby Muxloe promoted to the Premier Division. However, after finishing bottom of the Premier Division in 1988–89, the club were relegated back to Division One. They won the Division One title in 1994–95, earning promotion back to the Premier Division, where they finished as runners-up in 1997–98. They were runners-up for a second time in 2003–04 and again in 2006–07, a season that also saw them win the Leicestershire and Rutland Senior Cup, beating Ibstock United 3–2 in the final. The following 2007–08 season saw the club win the Premier Division championship. They then became founder members of the East Midlands Counties League and were the league's inaugural champions in 2008–09, earning promotion to the Midland Alliance.

In 2014 the Midland Alliance merged with the Midland Combination to form the Midland League, with Kirby Muxloe placed in the Premier Division. At the end of the 2014–15 season they were transferred to the Premier Division of the United Counties League. After finishing second-from-bottom of the United Counties League Premier Division in 2018–19, the club were relegated to Division One of the Midland League. At the end of the 2020–21 season they were transferred to Division One of the United Counties League. In 2023–24 the club won the Leicestershire and Rutland Senior Cup for a second time, beating Hathern in the final on penalties. At the end of the season they were moved back to Division One of the Midland League.

== Honours ==
- East Midlands Counties League
  - Champions 2008–09
- Leicestershire Senior League
  - Premier Division champions 2007–08
  - Division One champions 1994–95
- Leicestershire and Rutland Senior Cup
  - Winners 2006–07, 2023–24

== Records ==
- Best FA Cup performance: Second qualifying round, 2016–17
- Best FA Vase performance: Second round, 2024–25

== See also ==
- Kirby Muxloe F.C. players
