= Aylestone Park F.C. =

Association football club in England

Coordinates: 52.5911°N 1.1392°W

Aylestone Park
- Full name: Aylestone Park Football Club
- Nicknames: The Park, AP
- Founded: 1968
- Ground: Saffron Lane, Leicester
- Chairman: John Greaves
- Manager: Karl Towers
- League: United Counties League Premier Division North
- 2025–26: United Counties League Premier Division South, 5th of 20 (transferred)
Home colours	Away colours

Aylestone Park Football Club is a football club based in Leicester, England. They are currently members of the United Counties League Premier Division North and play at Saffron Lane.

== History ==
The club was established as Aylestone Park Youth in 1968 and became founder members of the Leicestershire Youth League. In the late 1970s the club was playing in the Charnwood Sunday League, winning the Division Three title in 1978–79. In 1980 they joined Division Two of the Leicester & District League as Aylestone Park Old Boys. The club won the division at the first attempt, earning promotion to Division One. The following season saw them finish as runners-up in Division One, resulting in promotion to the Premier Division. The club were subsequently Premier Division runners-up in 1983–84 and 1984–85. In 1989 they joined Division One of the Leicestershire Senior League. After finishing as runners-up in 1994–95, they were promoted to the Premier Division, where they remained until being relegated at the end of the 2001–02 season. The 2003–04 season saw them finish as runners-up in Division One, earning promotion back to the Premier Division.

In 2007 the club was renamed Aylestone Park. After finishing third in Premier Division in 2011–12, the club moved up to the East Midlands Counties League. They won the Leicestershire and Rutland Senior Cup and 2012–13, beating Ashby Ivanhoe. In 2015–16 they won the League Cup, beating South Normanton Athletic 2–1 in the final. At the end of the 2017–18 season, the club were transferred to Division One of the United Counties League. They were Division One champions in 2022–23, earning promotion to the Premier Division South. In 2024–25 the club were runners-up in the Premier Division South, qualifying for the promotion play-offs. After beating Eynesbury Rovers 5–0 in the semi-finals, they lost 2–1 to Rugby Borough in the final. The club finished fifth in the division the following season, before losing 4–1 to Coventry United in the play-off semi-finals. After the season they were transferred to the Premier Division North.

== Ground ==
The club initially played at the Recreation Ground in Aylestone Park, before obtaining a new site in 1972 when they were granted a lease on five acres of land on Saffron Lane by Leicester City Council. A grant from the Sports Council enabled the club to build a new ground, including a wooden hut, and they moved to the site in 1973. Floodlights were installed in 1974, with Gary Lineker playing for Aylestone in their first game under the lights against Nottingham Boys. A new clubhouse opened in 1994. The ground was also used by Leicester City Ladies.

== Honours ==
- United Counties League
  - Division One champions 2022–23
- East Midlands Counties League
  - League Cup winners 2015–16
- Leicester & District League
  - Division Two champions 1980–81
- Leicestershire and Rutland Senior Cup
  - Winners 2012–13

== Records ==
- Best FA Cup performance: Preliminary round, 2017–18, 2024–25
- Best FA Vase performance: Second round, 2020–21, 2025–26
