= West Bridgford F.C. =

Association football club in England

Coordinates: 52°55′59.9″N 1°6′24.3″W

West Bridgford
- Full name: West Bridgford Football Club
- Founded: 1990 (Colts), 2011 (Seniors)
- Ground: Regatta Way Sports Ground, West Bridgford
- Capacity: 1,000
- Chairman: Peter Stansbury
- Manager: Ryan Doherty
- League: United Counties League Division One
- 2025–26: United Counties League Division One, 15th of 23
- Website: westbridgfordcolts.com
Home colours

West Bridgford Football Club are a football club based in West Bridgford, Nottinghamshire, England. They are currently members of the United Counties League Division One and play at the Regatta Way Sports Ground.

== History ==
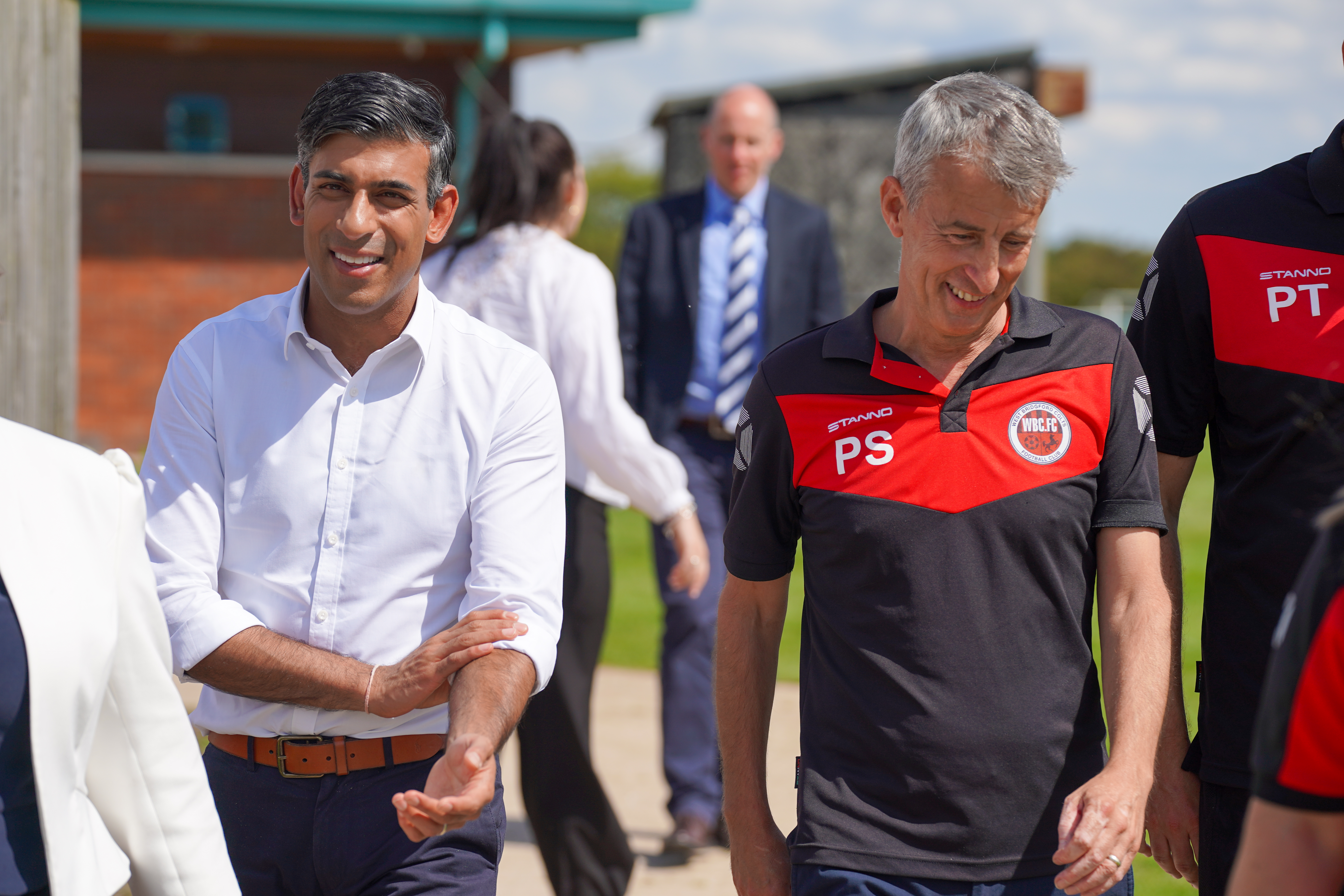
Chairman Peter Stansbury with Prime Minister Rishi Sunak in August 2023

In the 2015–16 season the men's section of West Bridgford FC was promoted after finishing 3rd in the Nottinghamshire Senior League. and under the guidance of management duo and former players Stuart Robinson and Chris Marks, they achieved their fifth promotion, subsequently joining and winning the step 6 - East Midlands Counties Football League, only six years after the men's section was officially formed.

They declined promotion due to a lack of facilities, to the Midland Football League and remained in the East Midlands Counties Football League. They remained members of the league until it was disbanded at the end of the 2020–21 season, at which point they were transferred to Division One of the United Counties League.

== Ground ==
The club play at Regatta Way Sports Ground, which has a capacity of 1,000.

== Honours ==
- East Midlands Counties League
  - Winners: 2016–17
- Nottinghamshire Senior League
  - Division Two Runners-up: 2011–12 (Promoted to Nottinghamshire Senior League Division One)
  - Division One Runners-up: 2013–14 (Promoted to Nottinghamshire Senior League Premier Division)
  - Premier Division Runners-up: 2014–15
  - Premier Division 3rd place: 2015–16 (Promoted to East Midland Counties Football League)
- Nottinghamshire F. A. Intermediate Cup
  - Winners: 2015–16
  - Runners-up: 2011–12

== Records ==
- Best FA Cup performance: First qualifying round, 2020–21
- Best FA Vase performance: Second round, 2016–17

== Former players ==
Players that have played/managed in the Football League or higher, or any foreign equivalent to this level (i.e. fully professional league)

- Mary Earps
- Simon Francis
- Shaun Harrad
- Katie Holtham
- Adam Newbold
- Han Stevens
