= Bardon Hill F.C. =

Association football club in England

Coordinates: 52°42′50″N 1°20′34″W

Bardon Hill
- Full name: Bardon Hill Football Club
- Ground: Bardon Close, Bardon
- League: Alliance League Division Two
- 2025–26: Alliance League Division Two, 5th of 9
Home colours

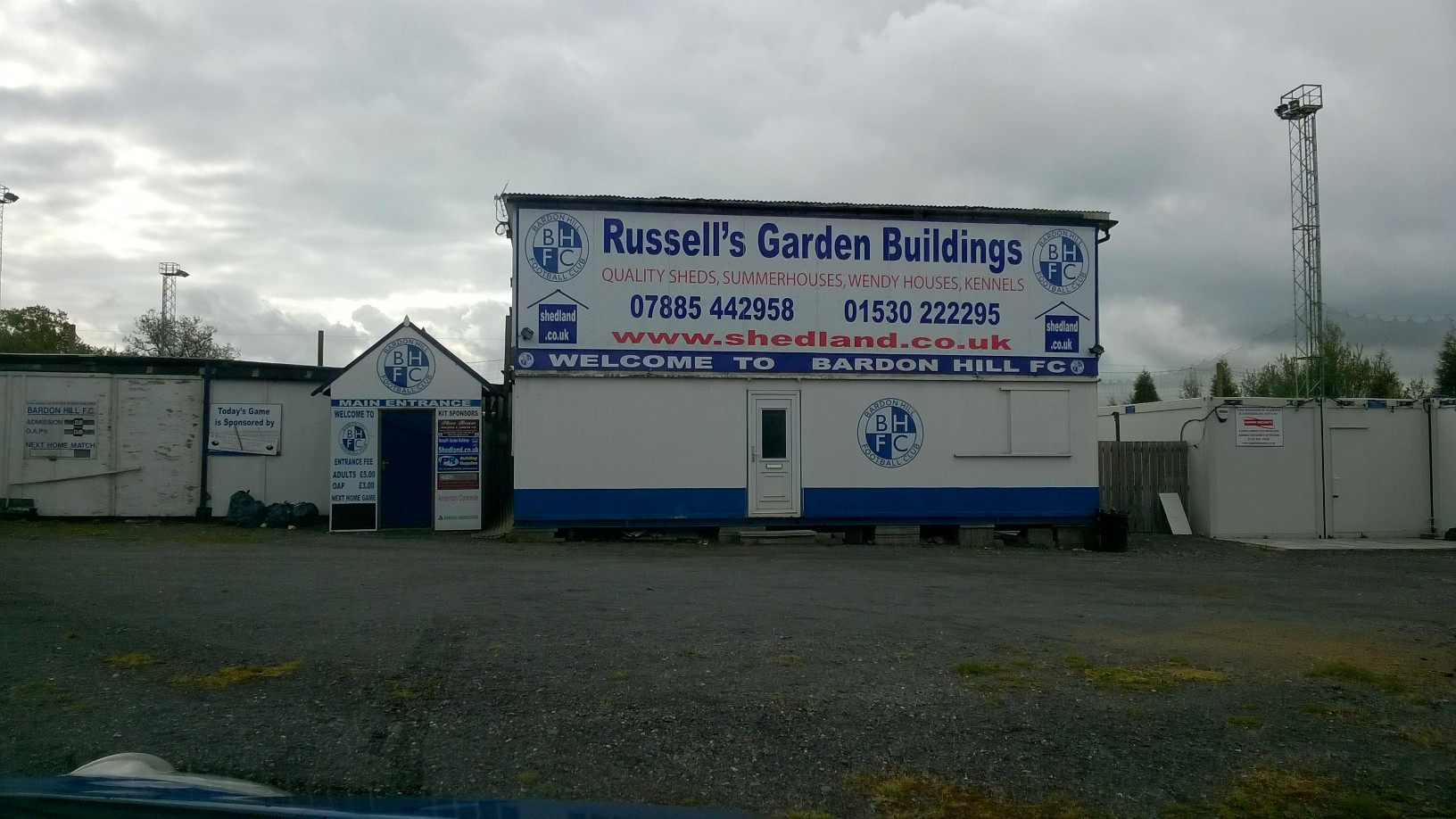
The entrance to Bardon Hill's home ground

Bardon Hill Football Club is a football club based in Bardon, near Coalville, Leicestershire, England. They are currently members of the Alliance League Division Two and play at Bardon Close in Coalville.

== History ==
The club was established in the 1890s as St Peters Church. They were later named Bardon Hill Granite and then Bardon Hill Sports. After playing in local leagues around Coalville, the club moved up to the Leicester & District League and the North Leicestershire League. In 1994 they joined Division One of the Leicestershire Senior League. After finishing as Division One runners-up in 2005–06 the club were promoted to the Premier Division.

In 2008 Bardon Hill Sports were founder members of the East Midlands Counties League. They were renamed Bardon Hill in 2010. The club won both the Leicestershire and Rutland Senior Cup and the East Midlands Counties League in 2014–15, earning promotion to the Premier Division of the Midland League. However, their first season in the Midland League ended in relegation to the Premier Division of the Leicestershire Senior League.

Despite finishing as runners-up in the Premier Division in 2017–18, Bardon Hill withdrew from the league at the end of the season due to a lack of personnel to run the club. The club continued to run junior teams until 2024, when it entered an adult team into the Alliance League.

== Ground ==
The club moved to Bardon Close in 1990 as their previous ground behind the church was required for the expansion of a quarry.

== Honours ==
- East Midlands Counties League
  - Champions 2014–15
- Leicestershire and Rutland Senior Cup
  - Winners 2014–15

== Records ==
- Best FA Cup performance: Second qualifying round, 2009–10
- Best FA Vase performance: Second round, 2011–12

== See also ==
- Bardon Hill F.C. players
