= South Normanton Athletic F.C. =

Association football club in South Normanton, England

Coordinates: 53°6′22.5936″N 1°20′49.1022″W

South Normanton Athletic
- Full name: South Normanton Athletic; Football Club
- Nickname: The Shiners
- Founded: 1926
- Ground: Lees Lane, South Normanton
- Capacity: 3,000 (300 seated)
- League: United Counties League Division One
- 2024–25: Central Midlands Alliance Premier Division South, 1st of 17 (promoted)
Home colours	Away colours

South Normanton Athletic Football Club is a football club based in South Normanton, near Alfreton, Derbyshire, England. They play at Lees Lane in the United Counties League Division One.

== History ==
The nickname ‘Shiners’ derives from the mid-1750s when South Normanton was at the heart of the ribbed stocking industry. The people involved in this craft worked long hours sitting at their windows on wooden stools, so much so that the backsides of their trousers became very shiny making them instantly recognisable as coming from the South Normanton area; since then local people have been referred to as ‘Shiners’.

The club was originally known as South Normanton Miners Welfare and played under that name until 1990. Under the new name South Normanton Athletic joined the Central Midlands League in the 1990–91 season. The club's first major success came in the 1993–94 season when they finished runners up in the Premier Division. This gained them promotion to the Supreme Division. The club made their first entry into the FA Vase in the 1994–95 season.

In the 1996–97 season the old changing rooms were destroyed by fire. The club's future lay in the balance and with limited time available members of the committee virtually worked round the clock to convert a derelict building into suitable changing rooms, which at the time were intended to be for a temporary period only the leagues deadline for completion was accomplished with little time to spare.

At the end of the 1996–97 season, the club was relegated due to the 3-year flood light installation rule not being met; funds set aside to complete this project had been spent in establishing new changing rooms. The floodlights were completed in 1998 and the club was reinstated back into the supreme division.

The team's best position being 3rd which was a promotion place. The club was promoted to the NCEL for the start of the 2003–04 season where they played till the club decided to fold at the end of the 2007–08 season due to an ageing committee and no new blood coming to the club.

The club reformed with a new committee under the chairmanship of Phil Bailey, with new management and players. Despite 5 seasons of promise, the dream of promotion could not be realised despite numerous top 3 finishes.

2013 brought the summer appointment of former Borrowash Vics manager Mark Wilson to the club. The team started strongly with 10 victories and 2 draws from the first twelve games, before a winter of weather postponements brought an abrupt end to the form. Victories became harder to come by in the New Year, and a run of one win in eight threatened to derail the promotion dream. However, Wilson steered the team to a strong run in and a runners-up finish. This was enough to guarantee a promotion to Step 6 East Midlands Counties League for the first time since the club's re-formation.

After finishing 2nd in the 2016–17 season they were promoted to the Midland League Premier Division after champions West Bridgford refused promotion.

On 6 April 2020, South Normanton Athletic announced that they had resigned from the Midland Football League.

For the 2020/2021 season, SNAFC successfully applied and resumed their status at Step 7 football in the Central Midlands Premier League and reinstated a reserves team playing the Central Midlands Division 1.

== Backroom staff ==
The first team manager is Dave Turner with Lee Fletcher as his assistant.

== Current squad ==
Note: Flags indicate national team as defined under FIFA eligibility rules; some limited exceptions apply. Players may hold more than one non-FIFA nationality.

No.	Pos.	Nation	Player
—	GK	ENG	Ross Etheridge
—	GK	ENG	Will Bland
—	DF	ENG	Lee Carter
—	DF	ENG	James Beardow
—	DF	ENG	Ryan Ordidge
—	DF	ENG	Ryan Hadley
—	DF	ENG	Kieran Ordidge
—	DF	ENG	Ben Paget
—	DF	ENG	Tommy Goodwin
—	MF	ENG	Oliver Rouse
—	MF	ENG	Grant Mitchell
—	MF	ENG	Richard Matthews

No.	Pos.	Nation	Player
—	MF	ENG	Marc Bright
—	MF	ENG	Nathan Hadley
—	MF	ENG	James Barry
—	MF	ENG	Elliott Bland
—	FW	ENG	Logan Liggins
—	FW	ENG	Thomas McTighe
—	FW	ENG	Matthew Crowe
—	FW	ENG	Perry Richards
—	FW	ENG	Charlie Reeves
—	FW	ENG	Sam Jackson
—	FW	ENG	Ty Macaskill
—	FW	ENG	Josh Parfitt

== Honours ==
- East Midlands Counties League
  - League Cup: Winners 2014–15
  - Runners-up: 2016–17 (Promoted)
- Central Midlands League
  - Champions: South Division 2024-25
  - Runners-up: South Division 2013–14, Premier Division 1993–94

== Records ==
- FA Cup
  - First Qualifying Round 2005–06, 2019–20
- FA Vase
  - Fourth Round 2019-20
