= Blackwell Miners Welfare F.C. =

Blackwell Miners Welfare
- Full name: Blackwell Miners Welfare Football Club
- Nickname(s): The Miners
- Founded: 1890
- Dissolved: 2012
- Ground: The Primrose Hill Sports Ground, Blackwell
- Capacity: 1,900
- League: Central Midlands League South Division
- 2011–12: East Midlands Counties League, 8th (resigned)
Home colours

Blackwell Miners Welfare F.C. was a football club based in Blackwell, Derbyshire, England. They played in the East Midlands Counties League up to the end of the 2011–12 season, when in July 2012 the football club announced its intention to withdraw from the league following problems with Blackwell Miners Welfare committee.
