= Belper United F.C. =

Association football club in England

Coordinates: 52°55′25″N 1°32′24″W

Belper United
- Full name: Belper United Football Club
- Founded: 1969
- Ground: Station Road, Mickleover
- Chairman: Matt Herrett
- Manager: Alex Steadman
- League: United Counties League Premier Division North
- 2025–26: United Counties League Premier Division North, 4th of 20
Home colours

Belper United Football Club is a football club based in Belper, Derbyshire, England. They are currently members of the United Counties League Premier Division North and play at Station Road, the home of Mickleover FC.

== History ==
A Belper United was established in the 1920s, but folded in the 1940s. The modern club was established in 1969 by a merger of Milford Sports and Belper Park Rangers. By the late 1970s the club was playing in the East Midlands Regional League. They were Division One champions in 1979–80, earning promotion to the Premier Division. In 1984–85 the club were the league's last Premier Division champions, with the league merging with the Central Alliance to form the Midlands Regional Alliance at the end of the season. Belper were placed in the Premier Division of the new league and became its inaugural champions in 1985–86. They won the league's Challenge Cup in 1992–93, before securing a second Premier Division title in 1994–95 and another Challenge Cup the following season. They were later relegated to Division One, which they won in the 2004–05 season to earn promotion back to the Premier Division.

Despite finishing bottom of the Premier Division in 2008–09, Belper were not relegated to Division One. In 2010 they switched to the South Division of the Central Midlands League. In 2014–15 they won the Central Midlands League Floodlight Cup, beating Clay Cross Town 3–2 in the final. After finishing as runners-up in the South Division in 2015–16, the club were promoted to the East Midlands Counties League. They remained members of the league until it was disbanded at the end of the 2020–21 season, at which point they were transferred to Division One of the United Counties League. In their first season in the league they finished third, qualifying for the promotion play-offs. After defeating Radford in the semi-finals, they beat Hinckley 1–0 in the final to earn promotion to the Premier Division North.

== Ground ==
The first team plays at Eastwood's Coronation Park. They played at Belper Town's Christchurch Meadow from the 2013–14 season, but later relocated to Asterdale Bowl, the home ground of Borrowash Victoria. The club returned to Christchurch Meadow at the start of the 2018–19 season. They moved on again to Coronation Park before the 2023–24 season. In 2026 they moved to Mickleover FC's Station Road.

== Honours ==
- Central Midlands League
  - Floodlit Cup winners 2014–15
- Midlands Regional Alliance
  - Premier Division champions 1985–86, 1994–95
  - Division One champions 2004–05
  - Challenge Cup winners 1992–93, 1995–96
- East Midlands Regional League
  - Premier Division champions 1984–85
  - Division One champions 1979–80

== Records ==
- Best FA Cup performance: Preliminary round, 2025–26
- Best FA Vase performance: Third round, 2022–23, 2026–27
