= Ibstock United F.C. =

Association football club in England

Coordinates: 52.692391°N 1.3969401°W

Ibstock United
- Full name: Ibstock United Football Club
- Nickname: The Welly
- Ground: Welfare Ground, Ibstock
- 2017–18: Leicestershire Senior League (withdrew)
Home colours

Ibstock United Football Club was a football club based in the village of Ibstock, near Coalville in Leicestershire, England. They played at the Welfare Ground.

== History ==
Ibstock Albion were formed in the 19th century and joined the Leicestershire Senior League in 1896, although they left after a single season. They rejoined the league in 1908, finishing bottom of the table in 1910–11 and left again in 1914. After World War I the club was replaced by Ibstock Colliery; the new club joined the Leicestershire Senior League in 1921 but left in 1928.

Another club was established under the name Ibstock Penistone Rovers. They were Coalville & District League champions in 1927–28 and runners-up in 1929–30. After winning the league again in 1933–34, the club moved up to the Leicestershire Senior League when it reformed alongside Ibstock Swifts. They left the league after a single season to join the Central Amateur League, but returned in 1939. The club left the league again in 1946 to rejoin the Central Amateur League. They were Central Amateur League runners-up in 1948–49 before winning the league in 1949–50. The club then rejoined the Leicestershire Senior League and were placed in Division Two.

Ibstock were Division Two champions in their first season back in the league, earning promotion to Division One; they also won the Leicestershire and Rutland Senior Cup, beating Coalville Town in the final. Although they were Division One runners-up the following season, they went on to finish bottom of Division One in 1952–53 and were relegated to Division Two. The following season saw them finish as runners-up in Division Two, resulting in promotion to Division One. The club were relegated again at the end of the 1962–63 season, earning promotion back to Division One at the end of the following season after finishing the season as Division Two runners-up. However, they finished bottom of Division One in 1964–65, resulting in an immediate return to Division Two. In 1967–68 the club won the Bass Charity Vase and the Division Two title, earning promotion back to Division One. They retained the Bass Charity Vase the following season, and remained in Division One until being relegated at the end of the 1977–78 season. However, they won Division Two at the first attempt and were promoted back to Division One.

The 1980–81 season saw Ibstock finish bottom of Division One, resulting in relegation to Division Two. In 1982–83 the club finished bottom of Division Two on zero points – despite winning one match and drawing three, they had five points deducted. At the end of the season they left to become founder members of the Central Midlands League, where they were placed in the Premier Division. After finishing bottom of the Premier Division in 1984–85 the club were relegated to the Central Division, which they finished bottom of the following season.

In 1986 the club was reconstituted as Ibstock Welfare, rejoining Division One of the Leicestershire Senior League. After finishing as runners-up in 1990–91, the club were promoted to the Premier Division. They won the Leicestershire and Rutland Senior Cup in 1993–94 with a 2–1 win over St Andrews. In 2005 the club absorbed Ibstock Youth and were renamed Ibstock United. Ibstock were founder members of the East Midlands Counties League in 2008. They won the Leicestershire and Rutland Senior Cup for a third time in 2011–12, defeating Ashby Ivanhoe in the final. In 2013 the club merged with Ellistown to form Ellistown & Ibstock United, with the new club playing in Ellistown. However, in 2015 Ibstock United were reformed as a senior club, joining Division One of the Leicestershire Senior League. After finishing fourth in 2016–17, the club were promoted to the Premier Division, where they would meet Ellistown, who were relegated from the East Midlands Counties League at the end of the 2016–17 season, also dropping "Ibstock" from their name.

Ibstock resigned from the Leicestershire Senior League in February 2018.

== Honours ==
- Leicestershire Senior League
  - Division Two champions 1950–51, 1967–68, 1978–79
- Central Amateur League
  - Champions 1949–50
- Coalville & District League
  - Champions 1927–28, 1933–34
- Leicestershire and Rutland Senior Cup
  - Winners 1950–51, 1993–94, 2011–12
- Bass Charity Vase
  - Winners 1967–68, 1968–69

== Records ==
- Best FA Vase performance: Second round, 1998–99

== See also ==
- Ibstock United F.C. players
