= Hinckley F.C. =

Hinckley
- Full name: Hinckley Football Club
- Nickname: The Builders
- Founded: 1967 (as Downes Sports)
- Dissolved: 2011
- Ground: Greene King Stadium, Hinckley, Leicestershire (groundshare with Hinckley United)
- Capacity: 4,329
- League: East Midlands Counties League
- 2010–11: East Midlands Counties League, 11th

Hinckley F.C. was a football club based in Hinckley, Leicestershire, England. Until 2010–11 they played in the East Midlands Counties Football League, having joined from the Leicestershire Senior League at the end of the 2007–08 season. They resigned from the league in 2011.

== History ==
The club was established in 1967 as Downes Sports — initially playing in the South Leicestershire League. For season 1974–75, whilst members of the Leicester & District League, they changed their name to Downes Athletic but reverted to Downes Sports the following season.

After finishing in third place in the Premier Division of the Leicester & District League, they joined the Leicestershire Senior League Division One for the 1987–88 season.

They gained promotion to the Premier Division by finishing third in 1991–92. Their highest-placed finish was in 2007–2008, when they claimed third place.

Season 2003–04 saw Downes Sports finish as runners-up in the Leicestershire Senior Cup.

After ending the 2006–07 season in 17th place (of 18 clubs), the club was reprieved from relegation due to a lack of suitable promotion candidates from the First Division.

The club changed its name from Downes Sports to Hinckley Downes in time for the 2007–08 season, when they effectively became the reserve side to Hinckley United, who played their home games at Greene King Stadium.

Their best seasons in the F.A. Vase were in 2001–02 and 2006–07 (as Downes Sports) and 2007–08 (as Hinckley Downes), when they lost in the first round proper on each occasion.

In the summer of 2010, the club again changed their by dropping the 'Downes' part to become simply Hinckley.

The club resigned from the league in 2011.
