= Ellistown F.C. =

Association football club in England

Coordinates: 52.6889°N 1.3594°W

Ellistown
- Full name: Ellistown Football Club
- Nickname: The Bull Terriers
- Founded: 1993
- Ground: Terrace Road, Ellistown
- Chairman: Andy Roach
- Manager: Scott Taylor
- League: Leicestershire Senior League Premier Division
- 2024–25: Leicestershire Senior League Premier Division, 15th of 15
Home colours

Ellistown Football Club is a football club based in the village of Ellistown, near Coalville in Leicestershire, England. They are currently members of the Leicestershire Senior League Premier Division and play at Terrace Road.

== History ==
The club was established as United Collieries Football Club in 1993 by a merger of Bagworth Colliery and Ellistown Colliery. The new club joined Division One of the Leicestershire Senior League. In 1996–97 they finished seventh in Division One and were promoted to the Premier Division. The club finished bottom of the Premier Division in their first season, but avoided relegation. After being renamed Ellistown in 1998, they finished in the bottom two of the Premier Division for the next two seasons. Although they were relegated to Division One at the end of the 1999–2000 season, they were Division One runners-up the following season and promoted back to the Premier Division.

In 2007 Ellistown were founder members of the East Midlands Counties League. They finished bottom of the league in 2011–12, and at the end of the following season the club merged with fellow East Midlands Counties League club Ibstock United to form Ellistown & Ibstock United, which played at Ellistown's ground. However, in 2015 a new Ibstock United was formed. The merged club finished bottom of the East Midlands Counties League in 2016–17, failing to win a league game all season, and were relegated to the Premier Division of the Leicestershire Senior League, where they would play alongside Ibstock United. In July 2017 the club was renamed Ellistown.

== Records ==
- Best FA Cup performance: Second qualifying round, 2014–15
- Best FA Vase performance: Second round, 2014–15

== See also ==
- Ellistown F.C. players
