= Leicester and District Football League =

Association football league in England

Leicester & District Football League
- Country: England
- Divisions: Premier Division; Division One; Division Two
- Feeder to: Leicestershire Senior League
- Current champions: Houghton Rangers (Premier Division); Old Aylestone (Division One); Cosby United Development (Division Two); (2018-19)

The Leicester and District Football League is an association football competition based in England. The league has three divisions, of which the highest, the Premier Division, is a feeder to the Leicestershire Senior League. There are also two reserve divisions which are not part of the league system.

Clubs are allowed to pay players at this level, however in the 2005–06 season, the only Premier Division side that paid players, Barlestone St Giles, came second, allowing Cosby United to take the crown. Cosby were unable to enter the Leicestershire Senior League, however, as their facilities did not meet Senior League standards.

In the 2019-20 season, all league fixtures were postponed until further notice.

== Member clubs 2018-19 ==
Premier Division

- Braunstone Trinity
- Burbage Old Boys
- Dunton & Broughton Utd
- Fleckney Athletic
- Glenfield Town
- Houghton Rangers
- Huncote
- Iqra
- Kibworth Town
- Northfield Emerald 2013
- St Patricks
- Whetstone Athletic

Division One

- AFC Andrews
- Dunton & Broughton Utd Reserves
- Forest East
- Glen Villa
- Griff & Coton FC
- Guru Nanak Gurdwara (GNG) Reserves
- Label Apeel
- Leicester Three Lions
- Magna 73 Reserves
- North Kilworth Reserves
- Old Aylestone
- Queniborough

Division Two

- Cosby United Development
- Dunton & Broughton United Development
- Fleckney Athletic Reserves
- Glenfield Town Reserves
- Huncote Reserves
- Kibworth Town Reserves
- Old Aylestone Reserves
- Scraptoft United
- St Patricks Reserves
- Studs FC
- Thurnby Willows
- Welford Victoria
