= Dunkirk F.C. =

Association football club in England

Coordinates: 52.9240°N 1.1706°W

Dunkirk
- Full name: Dunkirk Football Club
- Nickname: The Boatmen
- Founded: 1946
- Ground: Ron Steel Sports Ground, Dunkirk
- Capacity: 1,500 (150 seats)
- Chairman: Steve Harbottle
- Manager: Sam Ralph
- League: United Counties League Division One
- 2024–25: United Counties League Division One, 13th of 19
- Website: www.dunkirkfc.club
Home colours	Away colours	Third colours

Dunkirk Football Club is a football club based in the Dunkirk area of Nottingham, England. The club plays in the United Counties League Division One.

== History ==
Dunkirk FC were founded in 1946 and their nickname is "The Boatmen". The first league they joined was the Notts Amateur League, of which they were members until 1975. They won the Premier Division in that season, the club's first major honour. Accepted into the Notts Alliance League, they got off to a good start, eventually finishing runners up. Five years later they were champions.

In 1981–82, Dunkirk reached the semi-final of the Notts F.A. Intermediate Cup, a feat they repeated the following season. In the league they led Division One for much of the season. In 1986–87, the club finished 9th and reached the semi-final of the League Cup, losing 2–0 to John Player.

The following season saw the club improve on that semi-final by winning the League Cup. The next season saw them runners up in the league again.

In 1993–94 they reached the last 16 of the FA Vase before losing to Tiverton Town. 1995–96 saw the Boatmen make their debut in the Central Midlands Premier League, scoring 130 goals as they finished runners up to Killamarsh Juniors and so gained promotion to the Supreme Division. In the 1997–98 season they finished in 4th place and won the League Cup beating Clipstone Welfare 2–0 in the Final at Watnall Road.

2002–03 saw the Boatmen beat Sutton Town on penalties to win the Floodlit Cup and also reach the League Cup final, losing 2–0 to Dinnington Town at North Street.

In 2004–05 they won the Central Midlands Supreme Division for the first time and also won the Floodlit Cup.

In 2008–09 they became founder members of the East Midlands Counties Football League, which was a step up in league terms for the club. This step up also gave Dunkirk the opportunity to enter the FA Cup for the 1st time in their history.

The 2010–11 season saw Dunkirk ply their trade in step 5 football for the first time in their history and they finished 8th.

The club rebuilt again during the 2012–13 season but inconsistency was their main problem. They did however finish in a creditable 10th position winning 18 of their 42 matched, losing 16 and drawing 8. The reserves, under the guidance of Mark Harbottle, claimed silverware for the second successive season as they won the Central Midlands League Reserve Supreme Division with a very young side. Dunkirk though were once again on the lookout for a new chairman as David Johnson had to resign from his position due to work commitments. Craig Smith took on the role in the interim. The club remained members of the East Midlands Counties League until it was disbanded at the end of the 2020–21 season, at which point they were transferred to Division One of the United Counties League.

== Former managers ==
- Steve Throssell
- Will Andrew
- Darron Gee

== Honours ==
- East Midlands Counties League
  - Champions 2009–10, 2017–18
  - League Cup 2016–17
- Central Midlands Football League
- Supreme Division
  - Champions 2004–05
  - Runners-up 1996–97, 1998–99
- Premier Division
  - Runners-up 1995–96
- Notts Alliance
- Senior Division
  - Runners-up 1988–89, 1989–90, 1990–91
- Division 1
  - Champions 1984–85
- Division 2
  - Champions 1981–82

== Records ==
- FA Cup
  - Second round qualifying 2015–16
- FA Vase
  - Fifth round 1993–94
