= Radcliffe Olympic F.C. =

Association football club in England

Coordinates: 52°56′54.14″N 1°02′41.22″W

Radcliffe Olympic
- Full name: Radcliffe Olympic Football Club
- Founded: 1876
- Ground: Wharf Lane, Radcliffe-on-Trent,
- Capacity: 1,000
- Chairman: Frank Seyfert
- Manager: Joe Hegarty
- Coach: Dave Hignett, Chris Norris
- League: Nottinghamshire Senior League Division One
- 2024–25: Nottinghamshire Senior League Premier Division, 17th of 17 (relegated)
Home colours

Radcliffe Olympic F.C. is a football club based in Radcliffe-on-Trent, near Nottingham, Nottinghamshire, England. The club are currently members of the Nottinghamshire Senior League Division One and play at the Recreation Ground.

== History ==
The club was established in 1876. They joined the Notts Alliance, which they won in 1900–01. In the 1931–32 they won Division Two, as well as the South Notts League. In 1946–47 they won Division One of the Notts Realm League and the Division One Cup.

The club's next period of success was in the 1960s, when during a six-year period between the 1965–66 and 1970–71 seasons they won three Midlands Amateur Alliance League titles, the Central Alliance Premier Division, the East Midlands Regional League Division One.

In 1990–91 they won Division One of the Notts Alliance to earn promotion to the Senior Division, but were relegated back to Division One in 1992–93. They were relegated again in 1995–96, but were promoted back to Division One at the first attempt after finishing second in Division Two. In 2000–01 they finished second in Division One to return to the Senior Division. After winning the Senior Division in 2002–03 and merging with AFC Dayncourt, the club were promoted to the Premier Division of the Central Midlands League, which they won at the first attempt, earning promotion to the Supreme Division. They won the Supreme Division in 2008–09, earning promotion to the new East Midlands Counties League.

== Honours ==
- Central Midlands League
  - Supreme Division champions 2008–09
  - Premier Division champions 2003–04
- Notts Alliance
  - Champions 1900–01
  - Senior Division champions 2002–03
  - Division One champions 1990–91
  - Division Two champions 1931–32
  - Division Two Cup winners 1929–30
- Notts Realm League
  - Division One champions 1946–47
  - Division One Cup winners 1946–47, 1947–48
- South Notts League
  - Champions 1931–32

== Records ==
- FA Cup
  - Third Qualifying Round 2010–11
- FA Vase
  - First Round 2006–07
