= Holwell Sports F.C. =

Association football club in England

Coordinates: 52°46′05.95″N 0°55′33.37″W

Holwell Sports
- Full name: Holwell Sports Football Club
- Nicknames: The Green and Gold
- Founded: 1902
- Ground: Welby Road, Asfordby Hill
- Capacity: 1,000
- Chairman: Graham Lewin
- Manager: Vacant
- League: Midland League Division One
- 2025–26: United Counties League Division One, 20th of 23 (transferred)
Home colours

Holwell Sports Football Club is a football club based in Asfordby Hill, near Melton Mowbray, Leicestershire, England. They are currently members of the Midland League Division One and play at Welby Road.

== History ==
The club was established in 1902 as Holwell Works. They joined the Leicester & District League, and were league champions in 1907–08. After winning the league again the following season, the club moved up to the Leicestershire Senior League. In 1911–12 they won the Leicestershire Senior League title. At the end of the following season the club transferred to the Central Alliance. However, in their first season in the Alliance they finished bottom of the league and resigned.

Holwell subsequently played in the Melton Mowbray & District Amateur League. After winning the league in 1933–34, the club rejoined the re-established Leicestershire Senior League, the league having folded at the end of the 1929–30 season. In 1946 they were placed in the Central Division. An eleventh-place finish in 1947–48 saw them earn a place in Division One for the 1948–49 season. However, the club finished bottom of the table and were relegated to Division Two. Despite only finishing seventh in Division Two in 1949–50, they were promoted back to Division One at the first attempt.

In 1954–55 Holwell were Division One runners-up. They were runners-up again in 1957–58, but after finishing second-from-bottom in 1961–62, the club were relegated to Division Two. This began a period of yo-yoing between the divisions as they were promoted back to Division One at the end of the 1962–63 season, then relegated the following season. The club were promoted back to Division One again in 1965–66, but relegated back to Division Two again two seasons later. In 1976 the club left the league, returning to the Leicester & District League. After finishing as runners-up in 1978–79 they rejoined Division Two of the Senior League.

Holwell were Division Two runners-up in 1981–82, earning promotion to Division One., which was renamed the Premier Division in 1983. They were relegated back to the (renamed) Division One after finishing bottom of the Premier Division in 1983–84, but won Division One at the first attempt to ensure an immediate return to the Premier Division. In 1987–88 the club won the Premier Division title, and at the end of the season were renamed Holwell Sports. Under the new name, they won back-to-back Premier Division titles in 1991–92 and 1992–93. They were runners-up in 2000–01 and 2004–05, and won the League Cup in 2005–06. In 2008 the club were founder members of the East Midlands Counties League.

At the end of the 2017–18 season, Holwell were transferred to Division One of the United Counties League. In 2026 they were transferred to Division One of the Midland League.

== Honours ==
- Leicestershire Senior League
  - Premier Division champions 1911–12, 1987–88, 1991–92, 1992–93
  - Division One champions 1984–85
  - League Cup winners 2005–06
- Leicester & District League
  - Champions 1907–08, 1908–09
- Melton Mowbray & District Amateur League
  - Champions 1933–34
- Leicestershire and Rutland Senior Cup
  - Winners 1954–55, 1956–57, 1957–58

== Records ==
- Best FA Cup performance: First qualifying round, 2014–15, 2015–16
- Best FA Vase performance: Third round, 2013–14

== See also ==
- Holwell Sports F.C. players
