= Holbrook Sports F.C. =

Association football club in England

Coordinates: 53°00′25.04″N 1°27′53.53″W

Holbrook Sports
- Full name: Holbrook Sports Football Club
- Nickname: The Brookies
- Founded: 1996
- Ground: Holbrook Sports Ground, Holbrook
- Chairman: Daniel Troop
- Manager: Dean Parkin
- League: Central Midlands Alliance Premier Division South
- 2024–25: Central Midlands Alliance Premier Division South, 9th of 17
| Home colours | Away colours |

Holbrook Sports Football Club is a football club based in Holbrook, near Derby, Derbyshire, England. They are currently members of the Central Midlands Alliance Premier Division South and play at the Holbrook Sports Ground.

== History ==
Holbrook Miners Welfare were formed in 1931, joined the Premier Division of the Central Alliance in 1973. In 1983 they were founder members of the Central Midlands League, joining the Senior Division. They were Senior Division runners-up in the league's first season, missing out on the title on goal difference. After finishing third in 1984–85 they were promoted to the Premier Division. However, the club finished bottom of the Premier Division the following season and were relegated to Division One. The 1986–87 season saw them relegated for a second successive season, this time to Division Two. However, Division Two was disbanded at the end of the 1987–88 season and the club returned to Division One. After being placed in the Premier Division North after league reorganisation in 1991, the club left the league at the end of the 1991–92 season. They returned to the league in 1994, but left again after a single season and subsequently folded at the end of the 1995–96 season.

In 1996 a new club was formed under the name Holbrook Football Club, joining the Premier Division of the Central Midlands League. After winning the Premier Division in 1999–2000 they were promoted to the Supreme Division. In 2003 the club returned to the Holbrook Miners Welfare name. In 2008 they were founder members of the East Midlands Counties League. Another renaming in 2010 saw the club become Holbrook Sports. They dropped back into the Central Midlands League South Division at the end of the 2017–18 season after resigning from the East Midlands Counties League. They left the Central Midlands League after the 2020–21 season, but rejoined Division One West for the 2022–23 season under the name Holbrook Angels. After winning the Division One Cup in their first season back in the league, beating AFC Normanton 4–1 in the final, the club reverted to the name Holbrook Sports for the 2023–24 season. They went on to win the Division One West title in 2023–24, as well as retaining the Division One League Cup.

== Honours ==
- Central Midlands League
  - Premier Division champions 1999–2000
  - Division One West champions 2023–24
  - Division One League Cup winners 2022–23, 2023–24

== Records ==
- Best FA Cup performance: First qualifying round, 2009–10, 2010–11
- Best FA Vase performance: Fifth round, 2010–11
