= Borrowash Victoria A.F.C. =

Association football club in England

Coordinates: 52.910461°N 1.3893682°W

Borrowash Victoria
- Full name: Borrowash Victoria Association Football Club
- Nickname: Vics
- Founded: 1911
- Ground: Asterdale Bowl, Spondon
- Chairman: Leigh Daniels
- Manager: Garry Smith
- League: Central Midlands Alliance Premier Division South
- 2025–26: Central Midlands Alliance Premier Division South, 5th of 17
| Home colours | Away colours |

Borrowash Victoria Association Football Club is a football club based in Spondon, Derby, England. They are currently members of the Central Midlands Alliance Premier Division South and play at the Asterdale Bowl. The club originated in the adjacent village of Borrowash before relocating to Spondon in 1984.

== History ==
The club was established in 1911 and initially played in the Long Eaton & District Church League. They had a brief spell in the Derby Amateur League, but soon returned to the Long Eaton & District Church League. Following World War II the club was reformed under the name Wesleyan Youth Club, playing in the Derby & District Welfare League. They won the league in 1952–53 but folded in 1957.

The club reformed again in 1963 and joined Section E of the Derby Welfare League, replacing Borrowash Youth Club. In 1969 they joined Division One of the Central Alliance. They finished as runners-up in their first season, earning promotion to the Premier Division. The following season saw them finish as runners-up in the Premier Division. They subsequently switched to the East Midlands Regional League, where they finished as runners-up in the Premier Division in 1973–74. They were runners-up again in 1975–76 and 1976–77, before winning the league in 1977–78.

In 1979 the club joined Division One of the Midland League. They won the division and the divisional cup in 1980–81, but were not promoted. In 1982 the league merged with the Yorkshire League to form the Northern Counties East League, with Borrowash placed in Division Two South. The first season of the league saw them finish as runners-up, earning promotion to Division One South. They went on to win Division One South the following season, but were not promoted due to their inadequate ground facilities. After finishing as Division One South runners-up in 1984–85, they were placed in Division One for the 1985–86 season. Despite finishing seventh, they left the league at the end of the season, dropping into the new Supreme Division of the Central Midlands League, which had been founded as a result of many Nottinghamshire and Derbyshire clubs leaving the Northern Counties East League due to disputes between coal mining unions in the East Midlands and Yorkshire over the miners' strike.

The club remained in the Central Midlands League until 1995, when they rejoined Division One of the Northern Counties East League. In 2000–01 they won Division One and were promoted to the Premier Division. However, after finishing second-from-bottom for two consecutive seasons, they were relegated back to Division One after finishing last in 2004–05. In 2008 the club became founder members of the East Midlands Counties League, which sat at the same level in the pyramid as Division One of the Northern Counties East League. They were runners-up in the league's first season, and again in both 2010–11 and 2011–12. They also won the League Cup in both 2008–09 and 2011–12. The club remained members of the East Midlands Counties League until it was disbanded at the end of the 2020–21 season, at which point they were transferred to Division One of the United Counties League.

== Ground ==
The club initially played at Coffee Joe's Field in Borrowash, with changing rooms located a mile and a half away. Up until 1984, they played on a council-owned pitch at Deans Drive in Borrowash, but were threatened with expulsion from the league due to drainage at Deans Drive, and were refused promotion at the end of the 1983–84 season. In need of new facilities, the club moved to the Asterdale Bowl Ground, on Borrowash Road in the Spondon area of Derby, which adjoins Borrowash. Since 2012, the club's junior section are based at Deans Drive, restoring the club's link with their former ground.

The club initially leased the Asterdale ground before later purchasing it. A new changing room was built and floodlights installed in 1985–86, with the official switching on marked by a friendly match against Nottingham Forest. The attendance of around 2,000 remains the cub's record. A 250-seat stand was built after the club bought the ground in the 1990s. Belper United shared Asterdale from 2016 to 2018, while Derby County Ladies previously also played at the ground. The Bowl is part of the wider Asterdale sports complex, which is also home to Graham Street Prims and Leesbrook Rugby Club.

== Honours ==
- Northern Counties East League
  - Division One South champions 1983–84
  - Division One champions 2000–01
- East Midlands Counties League
  - League Cup winners 2008–09, 2011–12
- Midland League
  - Division One champions 1980–81
  - Division One Cup winners 1980–81
- East Midlands Regional League
  - Premier Division champions 1977–78
- Derby & District Welfare League
  - Champions 1952–53

== Records ==
- Best FA Cup performance: Third qualifying round, 1991–92
- Best FA Vase performance: Fourth round, 1990–91, 2000–01, 2012–13

== See also ==
- Borrowash Victoria A.F.C. players
