= Leicester St Andrews F.C. =

Association football club in England

Coordinates: 52°36′24.51″N 1°09′24.17″W

Leicester St Andrews
- Full name: St Andrews Football Club
- Nicknames: The Saints, The Drews
- Founded: 1973; 53 years ago
- Ground: Canal Street, Aylestone
- Capacity: 1,000
- League: Midland League Division One
- 2024–25: Midland League Division One, 3rd of 22
Home colours

Leicester St Andrews Football Club are a football club based in Aylestone, a suburb of Leicester, England. They play in the Midland League Division One, having been relegated from the Premier Division at the end of the 2017–18 season.

== History ==
They joined Division One of the Leicestershire Senior League in 1985 and promoted to the Premier Division after two seasons. The Andrews are three-time champions of the Leicestershire Senior League Premier Division. In the 1994–95 season, the Drews reached the 5th round of the FA Vase.

The 2013–14 season saw the side reach the semi-final of the FA Vase. The run included victories against several Step 5 sides along the way including away victories at AFC Rushden and Diamonds and East Preston.

The semi-final draw gave the Andrews a two-legged tie against much favoured West Auckland. A goalless draw was played out in the first leg, which provided a chance of a bumper attendance at Canal Street for the return tie. A record 1,600 crowd in the second leg saw St Andrews go 1–0 up with a goal by 16-year-old, Leicester, England native, Brady Hickey. It was not to be for the Andrews as two goals for West Auckland in the last 11 minutes from set pieces put an end to the Vase run.

== Ground ==
The first team and reserves play at Canal Street in Aylestone.

== Honours ==
- East Midlands Counties League (1): 2015–16
- Leicestershire Senior League (3): 1989–90, 1993–94, 1995–96
- Leicestershire Challenge Cup (1): 1997

== Records ==
- FA Cup
  - Preliminary round: 2009–10
- FA Vase
  - Semi-final: 2013–14

== See also ==
- Leicester St Andrews F.C. players
