= Anstey Nomads F.C. =

Association football club in England

Coordinates: 52.6758°N 1.1802°W

Anstey Nomads
- Full name: Anstey Nomads Football Club
- Nickname: The Nomads
- Founded: March 1946
- Ground: Cropston Road, Anstey
- Capacity: 1,000
- Chairman: Tony Blanchard
- Manager: Conrad Logan
- League: Southern League Premier Division Central
- 2025–26: Northern Premier League Division One Midlands, 1st of 22 (promoted)
- Website: ansteynomads.com
Home colours	Away colours

Anstey Nomads Football Club is a football club based in Anstey, Leicestershire, England. They are currently members of the Southern League Premier Division Central and play at Cropston Road.

== History ==
The club was established in March 1946 by a merger of Anstey Methodists and St Mary's under the name Anstey Meths and Mary's. They joined the Central Division of the Leicestershire Senior League, Anstey Methodists having been members of the league prior to World War II. The new club were Central Division runners-up in their first season. In January 1947 the club was renamed Anstey Nomads, and when the league was reorganised in 1948, they were placed in Division One.

In 1951–52 Anstey won Division One, a feat they repeated in 1953–54. In 1955 the club also started playing in Division One of the Central Alliance, and left the Leicestershire Senior League at the end of the 1955–56 season. For 1956–57 the club were placed in Division One South of the Central Alliance, where they remained until being transferred to Division One North in 1958. A year later they were moved back to Division One South. The club finished bottom of the division in 1960–61, but with several clubs leaving the league, they were placed in the new Premier Division. In 1967 the club switched to the Premier Division of the East Midlands Regional League.

In 1973 Anstey rejoined the Leicestershire Senior League and were placed in Division Two. They won the division at the first attempt, earning promotion to Division One. After finishing as runners-up for three successive seasons from 1979 to 1981, the club won back-to-back titles in 1981–82 and 1982–83. They were runners-up again in the renamed Premier Division in 1985–86 and 1990–91, with their next title coming in 2008–09, resulting in promotion to the East Midlands Counties League. At the end of the 2017–18 season, the club were transferred to Division One of the United Counties League.

Anstey's first season in the United Counties League saw them finish as runners-up in Division One, earning promotion to the Premier Division. When the league's top division was split in two in 2021, the club were placed in the Premier Division North. In 2022–23 they were Premier Division North champions, resulting in promotion to Division One Midlands of the Northern Premier League, as well as winning the League Cup with a 3–0 win over Deeping Rangers in the final. The following season saw them finish as runners-up in Division One Midlands, qualifying for the promotion play-offs. After beating Quorn 3–1 in the semi-finals, they lost the final 2–0 to Harborough Town. A third-place finish in the division in 2024–25 was followed by a play-off semi-final loss to Worcester City.

== Ground ==
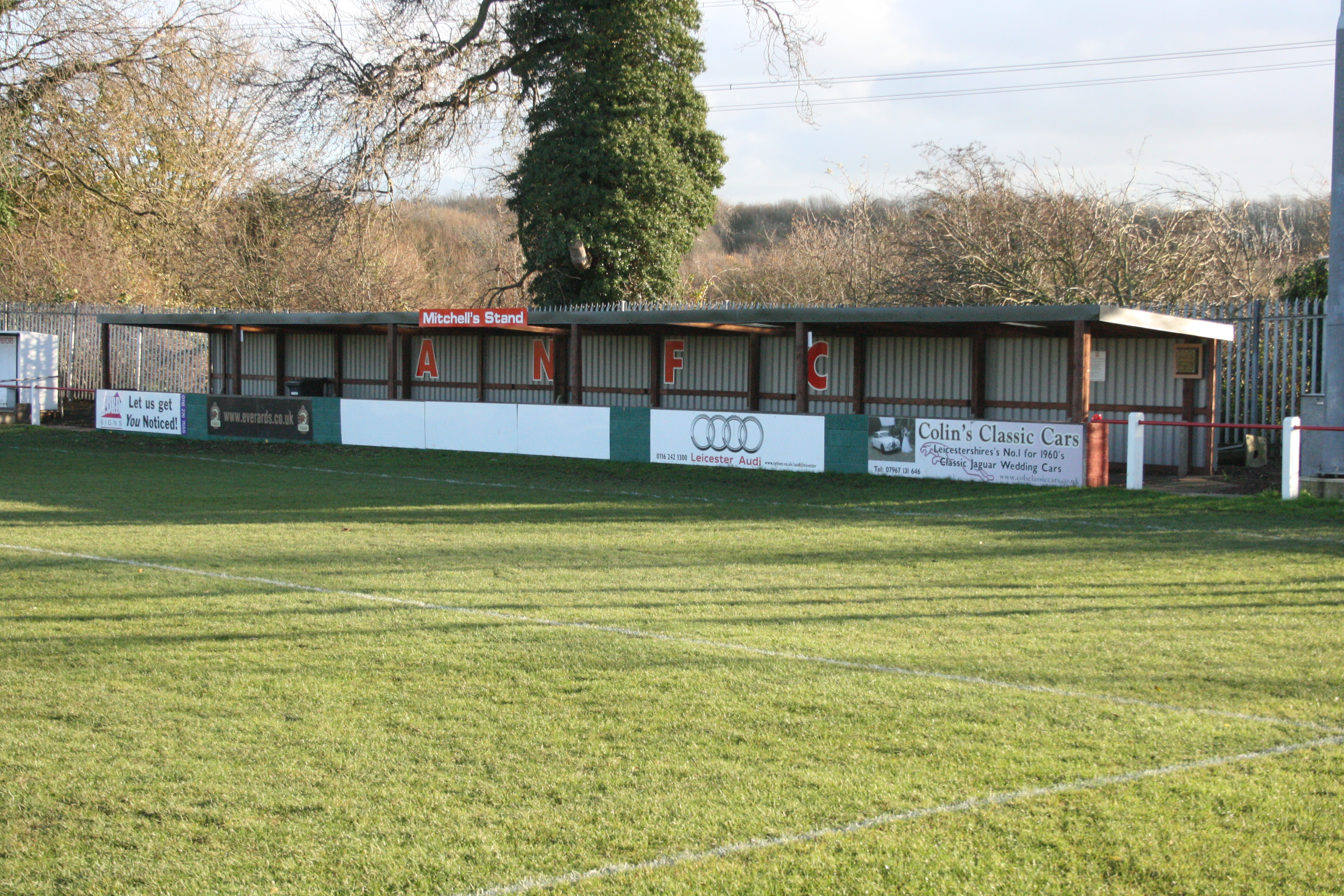
Cropston Road

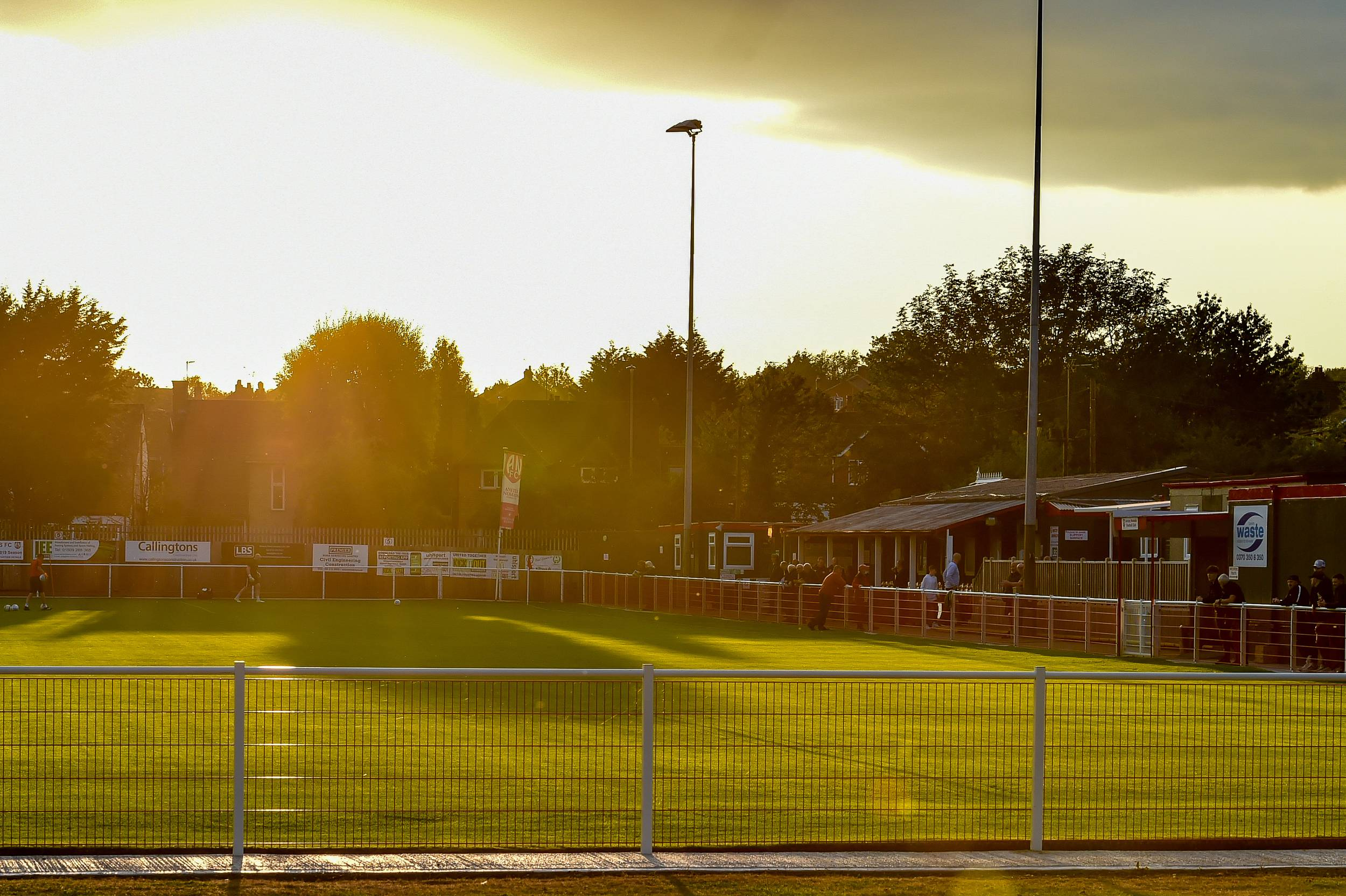
Cropston Road

Anstey Nomads have played their home games at Cropston Road since their formation. Facilities include a clubhouse with licensed bar, changing rooms, car parking and sheltered seating and standing for spectators.

== Current squad ==
As of 9 September 2026

Note: Flags indicate national team as defined under FIFA eligibility rules; some limited exceptions apply. Players may hold more than one non-FIFA nationality.

No.	Pos.	Nation	Player
—	GK	ENG	Brad Clarkson
—	DF	ENG	Darien Wauchope
—	DF	ENG	Jordan Annable
—	DF	ENG	Jonty Bouch
—	DF	ENG	Kyle Tomlin
—	DF	ENG	Lewis Gibbens
—	DF	ANT	Oscar Tonge
—	DF	ENG	Tristen Thomas
—	MF	ENG	Callum Feeney

No.	Pos.	Nation	Player
—	MF	ENG	Henry Bestwick
—	MF	ENG	Rubyn Gill
—	MF	ENG	Tobias Liversidge
—	FW	ENG	Alfie Jack Wright Smith
—	FW	ENG	Courey Grantham
—	FW	ZIM	Tendai Chitiza
—	FW	ENG	Harvey Kirby-Moore
—	FW	ENG	Luis Rose
—	FW	ENG	Martyn Waghorn

== Honours ==
- Northern Premier League
  - Division One Midlands champions 2025–26
- United Counties League
  - Premier Division North champions 2022–23
  - League Cup winners 2022–23
- Leicestershire Senior League
  - Premier Division/Division One champions 1951–52, 1953–54, 1981–82, 1982–83, 2008–09
  - Division Two champions 1973–74
  - League Cup winners 2008–09
- Leicestershire and Rutland Senior Cup
  - Winners 1994–95
- Leicestershire Junior Cup
  - Winners 1994–95
- Battle of Britain Cup
  - Winners 2008–09, 2011–12
- Rollestone Charity Cup
  - Winners 2008–09

== Records ==
- Record attendance: 4,500 vs Hayes, FA Amateur Cup second round, 1954–55
- Best FA Cup performance: Fourth qualifying round, 2022–23
- Best FA Trophy performance: Fourth round, 2025–26
- Best FA Vase performance: Fifth round, 1995–96, 2020–21, 2021–22

== See also ==
- Anstey Nomads F.C. players
