= Radford F.C. =

Association football club in England

Coordinates: 52°58′04.2″N 1°10′26.38″W

Radford
- Full name: Radford Football Club
- Nickname: The Pheasants
- Founded: 1964 (as Manlove & Alliots)
- Ground: Selhurst Street, Radford
- Capacity: 1,200
- Chairman: Bob Thomas
- Manager: David Boafo
- League: United Counties League Division One
- 2024–25: United Counties League Division One, 9th of 19
Home colours	Away colours

Radford Football Club is a football club based in the Nottingham inner-city area of Radford, England. The club is based at Selhurst Street, off Radford Road. They are nicknamed 'The Pheasants'. They play in the United Counties League Division One.

== History ==
The club was established in 1964 as a works team of the engineering and manufacturing firm Manlove & Alliots. The club was founded in Hyson Green outside the Cricketers Arms, when they had saved enough money to buy some home shirts. In 1966 they joined the Nottingham Sunday League system and continued as Manloves until 1973–74, when they changed their name for two seasons and played under the guise of Fountain FC. In 1975, the club changed its name again, becoming Radford Olympic, and in 1977 became the first amateur club in Britain to be allowed to wear advertising on their shirts.

In season 1979-80 a move to Saturday football was made when the club joined the East Midlands Regional League. They became champions of the East Midlands Regional League Division One in 1983. The club joined the newly formed Central Midlands League in season 83-84 and in this season the team won the Central Midlands League Senior Cup. For the start of the 1985/86 season the club moved into their Selhurst Street ground

From 2003 to 2004, the club played its football in the Central Midlands League Supreme Division, and won the Central Midlands League Floodlit Cup in 2006.

They were invited to join the semi–professional East Midlands Counties Football League for the 2008–09 season. and joined the new league along with seven other Central Midlands League clubs.

Radford's 50th anniversary celebrations in 2014 included the installation of a brand new playing surface at Selhurst Street and a friendly against a Nottingham Forest XI. A fantastic 50th anniversary year was completed with Radford finishing 3rd in the EMCL, their highest ever league position. The finish also ensured FA cup football was played at Selhurst Street in the 15/16 season. In 2015/16, under manager Glenn Russell, the club had a run of 19 unbeaten league games and finished runners up in the EMCL behind St Andrews. The club were informed that they had been promoted to the Midland League Premier Division as St Andrews had failed their ground grading but later told this decision had been successfully appealed.

They remained members of the EMCL until it was disbanded at the end of the 2020–21 season, at which point they were transferred to Division One of the United Counties LeagueDespite the league season being cut short, Radford broke a club record by reaching the FA Vase third round for the first time. In the 2021–22 season Radford finished 4th in the UCL Division 1 and participated in the play-offs for the first time, narrowly losing to Belper United at the semi-final stage. Most recently, in 2022-23 Radford registered their record league victory, winning 11–0 against St Andrews.

== Honours ==
- East Midlands Regional League Division One Champions 1982–83
- Central Midlands League Premier Division
- Runners-up 1984–85
- East Midlands Counties League
- Runners-up 2015–16
- East Midlands Counties League Cup
- Winners 2017–18

== Records ==
- FA Cup
  - Extra Preliminary Round 2009–10, 2016–17, 2017–18, 2018–19, 2019–20, 2020–21, 2022–23
  - Preliminary Round 2015–16
- FA Vase
  - First Round 1987–88, 2015–16, 2021–22, 2022–23
  - Second Round 2016–17, 2025–26
  - Third Round 2020-21, 2025–26
