= Graham Street Prims F.C. =

Association football club in England

Coordinates: 52°54′42.32″N 1°23′27.05″W

Graham Street Prims
- Full name: Graham Street Prims Football Club
- Nickname: The Prims
- Founded: 1904
- Ground: Asterdale Sports Ground, Derby
- Chairman: Charlie McCluskey
- Manager: Jack Havron
- League: Central Midlands Alliance Premier Division South
- 2025–26: Central Midlands Alliance Premier Division South, 2nd of 17
Home colours

Graham Street Prims Football Club is a football club based in Derby, England. They are currently members of the Central Midlands Alliance Premier Division South and play at the Asterdale Sports Ground in the Spondon area of Derby.

== History ==
The club was established in 1904 by members of Primitive Methodist church in Graham Street. They initially played in the Derby Sunday Schools' League, but folded in 1914. They reformed in 1953 and played in the Derby & District Senior League. In 1968 the club joined the Premier Division of the Central Alliance, with the reserves playing in Division One. They went on to win the Premier Division in 1970–71, after which they joined Division One of the East Midlands Regional League. They subsequently won the Division One title in 1971–72, earning promotion to the Premier Division.

Graham Street Prims were East Midlands Regional League champions in 1978–79. In 1981 they were elected into Division One of the Midland League. However, at the end of the 1981–82 season the league merged with the Yorkshire League to form the Northern Counties East League, with the club placed in Division Two South. League reorganisation saw them placed in Division One South in 1984, and then Division Three in 1985. However, Division Three was disbanded at the end of the 1985–86 season and the club dropped into the Premier Division of the Central Midlands League.

In 1987 the club was renamed Derby Prims. They were Premier Division runners-up in 1987–88, but folded in 1991 due to their ground not meeting the league requirements. After being reformed again in 1995 and absorbing the Derby Carriage & Wagon club, the club rejoined the Premier Division of the Central Midlands League. A third-place finish in their first season saw them promoted to the Supreme Division. Although they were relegated back to the Premier Division at the end of the 1998–99 season, the club were Premier Division runners-up the following season, earning promotion back to the Supreme Division. In 2008 the club were founder members of the East Midlands Counties League. In 2013–14 they won the League Cup, beating Sutton Town 4–2 in the final. The club remained members of the East Midlands Counties League until it was disbanded at the end of the 2020–21 season, at which point they were transferred to Division One of the United Counties League. After one season in the United Counties League, they were due to be transferred again, this time to Division One of the Midland League, but chose relegation to the South Division of the Central Midlands League

== Ground ==
After reforming in 1995, the club played at the Railway Ground in Longbridge Lane. However, the ground did not have floodlights and was frequently vandalised. As a result, the club built a new ground on Borrowash Road adjacent to Borrowash Victoria's ground.

== Honours ==
- East Midlands Counties League
  - League Cup winners 2013–14
- East Midlands Regional League
  - Champions 1978–79
  - Division One champions 1971–72
- Central Alliance
  - Premier Division champions 1970–71

== Records ==
- Best FA Cup performance: Extra-preliminary round, 2013–14, 2014–15
- Best FA Vase performance: Third round, 2013–14

== See also ==
- Graham Street Prims F.C. players
- Graham Street Prims F.C. managers
