= Barrow Town F.C. =

Association football club in England

Coordinates: 52.750099°N 1.1601359°W

Barrow Town
- Full name: Barrow Town Football Club
- Nickname: The Riversiders
- Ground: Riverside Park, Barrow upon Soar
- Capacity: 2,000 (100 seated)
- Chairman: Michael Bland
- Manager: Wade Ball & Jordan Holmes
- League: Leicestershire Senior League Division One
- 2024–25: Leicestershire Senior League Division One, 14th of 16
Home colours

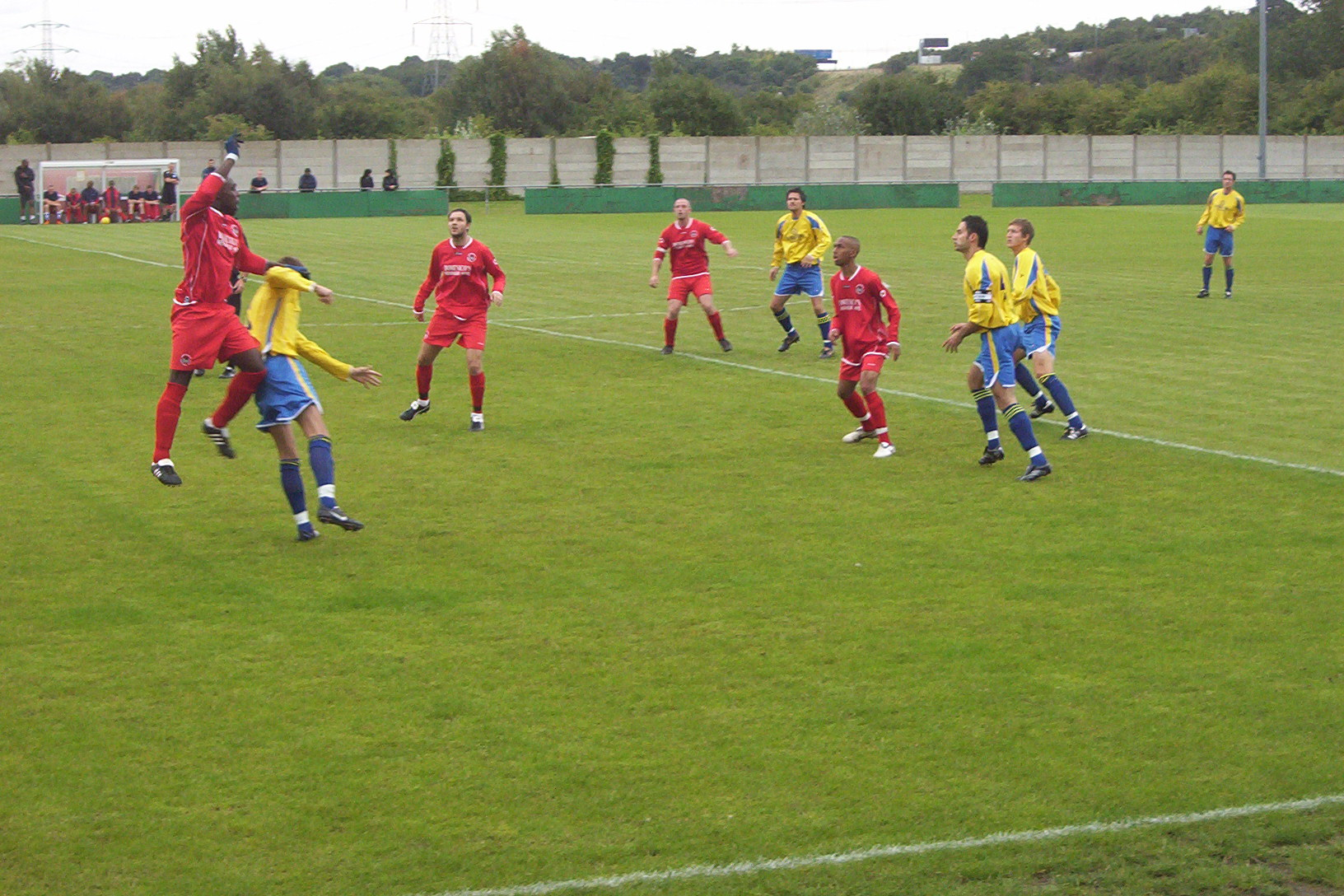
Barrow Town (yellow shirts) take on Castle Vale in the FA Cup in 2008

Barrow Town Football Club is a football club based in the large village of Barrow upon Soar, Leicestershire, England. They are currently members of the Leicestershire Senior League Division One and play at Riverside Park.

== History ==
The club was established as Barrow Old Boys as most of its players were former pupils of the local grammar school. They played in the Leicestershire Mutual League and later the Loughborough Alliance, which they won in 1940–41. Following World War II the club joined the Western Division of the Leicestershire Senior League in 1946. Two years later the league was re-organised and the club were placed in Division Two.

The 1968–69 season saw Barrow win the Loughborough Charity Cup and the Sileby Cup, as well as finishing as runners-up in Division Two and earning promotion to Division One. However, they were relegated back to Division Two at the end of the 1970–71 season. In 1981 they adopted their current name, and in 1983 Division Two was renamed Division One. After winning Division One in 1992–93, the club were promoted to the Premier Division, where they remained until 2008, finishing as runners-up in 1994–95, 2002–03, 2005–06 and 2007–08 and winning the League Cup in 2002–03 and the Loughborough Charity Cup again in 1996–97, 1998–99, 2000–01 and 2006–07. In 2008 they became founder members of the East Midlands Counties League. They remained members of the league until it was disbanded at the end of the 2020–21 season, at which point they were transferred to Division One of the United Counties League. In 2022–23 the club finished 15th of 21 in Division One and were voluntarily relegated to the Premier Division Leicestershire Senior League

== Ground ==
The club originally played at a ground on Mill Lane, before moving to Cotes Road and later North Street when they joined the Loughborough Alliance. They moved to their current Riverside Park around 1970. It has a capacity of 2,000, of which 100 is seated.

== Honours ==
- Leicestershire Senior League
  - Division One champions 1992–93
  - League Cup winners 2002–03
- Loughborough Alliance
  - Champions 1940–41
- Loughborough Charity Cup
  - Winners 1968–69, 1996–97, 1998–99, 2000–01, 2006–07
- Battle of Britain Memorial Cup
  - Winners 2006–07, 2007–08, 2010–11
- Sileby Cup
  - Winners 1968–69

== Records ==
- Best FA Cup performance: Third qualifying round, 2011–12
- Best FA Vase performance: Second round proper, 2000–01, 2001–02, 2005–06

== See also ==
- Barrow Town F.C. players
