= 2016–17 FA Cup qualifying rounds =

Tournament details
- Country: England; Guernsey; Wales

The 2016–17 FA Cup qualifying rounds open the 136th season of competition in England for The Football Association Challenge Cup (FA Cup), the world's oldest association football single knockout competition. For the third successive year, 736 entrants were accepted into the competition.

The large number of clubs entering the tournament from lower down (Levels 5 to 10) in the English football pyramid mean that the competition is scheduled to start with six rounds of preliminary (2) and qualifying (4) knockouts for these non-League teams. The 32 winning teams from the fourth qualifying round progress to the First round proper, when League teams tiered at Levels 3 and 4 enter the competition.

== Calendar and prizes ==
The calendar for the 2016–17 FA Cup qualifying rounds, as announced by The Football Association.

Round	Main date	Leagues entering at this round	New entries this round	Winners from previous round	Number of fixtures	Prize money
Extra preliminary round	6 August 2016	Levels 9-10	368	none	184	£1,500
Preliminary round	20 August 2016	Level 8	136	184	160	£1,925
First qualifying round	3 September 2016	Level 7	72	160	116	£3,000
Second qualifying round	17 September 2016	National League North; National League South	44	116	80	£4,500
Third qualifying round	1 October 2016	none	none	80	40	£7,500
Fourth qualifying round	15 October 2016	National League	24	40	32	£12,500
For the next rounds see 2016–17 FA Cup

== Extra preliminary round ==
Extra preliminary round fixtures were due to be played on Saturday 6 August 2016, with replays taking place no later than Thursday 11 August 2016. A total of 368 teams, from Level 9 and Level 10 of English football, entered at this stage of the competition. The round included 76 teams from Level 10 of English football, being the lowest ranked clubs to compete in the tournament.

Tie	Home team (tier)	Score	Away team (tier)	Att.
1	Ashington (9)	1–2	Nelson (9)	216
2	Heaton Stannington (10)	2–3	West Auckland Town (9)	350
3	Harrogate Railway Athletic (9)	1–1	Albion Sports (9)	107
replay	Albion Sports (9)	0–3	Harrogate Railway Athletic (9)	108
4	Easington Colliery (10)	0–1	Northallerton Town (10)	100
5	West Allotment Celtic (9)	0–2	Consett (9)	156
6	Shildon (9)	6–1	Bedlington Terriers (10)	161
7	Seaham Red Star (9)	1–3	Morpeth Town (9)	160
8	Thornaby (10)	0–4	Bishop Auckland (9)	136
9	Liversedge (9)	2–5	Guisborough Town (9)	138
10	North Shields (9)	0–0	Jarrow Roofing BCA (9)	276
replay	Jarrow Roofing BCA (9)	0–2	North Shields (9)	178
11	Bridlington Town (9)	1–1	Silsden (10)	141
replay	Silsden (10)	1–3	Bridlington Town (9)	137
12	Newcastle Benfield (9)	2–0	Thackley (9)	72
13	Whitley Bay (9)	2–2	Norton & Stockton Ancients (10)	222
replay	Norton & Stockton Ancients (10)	2–1	Whitley Bay (9)	91
14	Chester-le-Street Town (9)	3–0	Garforth Town (9)	127
15	Ryhope Colliery Welfare (9)	2–2	Pickering Town (9)	114
replay	Pickering Town (9)	3–3 (2–1 p)	Ryhope Colliery Welfare (9)	142
16	Padiham (9)	1–0	Team Northumbria (10)	141
17	Marske United (9)	3–1	South Shields (9)	411
18	Penrith (9)	1–0	Sunderland RCA (9)	126
19	Washington (9)	2–2	Newton Aycliffe (9)	104
replay	Newton Aycliffe (9)	0–2	Washington (9)	106
20	Durham City (10)	0–4	Billingham Synthonia (10)	101
21	Barnoldswick Town (9)	2–2	Dunston UTS (9)	201
replay	Dunston UTS (9)	4–0	Barnoldswick Town (9)	242
22	Armthorpe Welfare (9)	0–2	Handsworth Parramore (9)	88
23	Maltby Main (9)	0–1	Squires Gate (9)	68
24	Penistone Church (10)	1–3	Cheadle Town (10)	175
25	Alsager Town (10)	4–1	Barton Town Old Boys (9)	82
26	Pontefract Collieries (10)	3–2	Runcorn Town (9)	72
27	Parkgate (9)	2–1	Irlam (9)	75
28	Maine Road (9)	3–3	Nostell Miners Welfare (10)	130
replay	Nostell Miners Welfare (10)	2–3	Maine Road (9)	92
29	Congleton Town (9)	3–0	New Mills (9)	195
30	West Didsbury & Chorlton (9)	0–0	A.F.C. Liverpool (9)	178
replay	A.F.C. Liverpool (9)	0–1	West Didsbury & Chorlton (9)	161
31	Hemsworth Miners Welfare (9)	2–1	Runcorn Linnets (9)	171
32	A.F.C. Blackpool (10)	0–1	Ashton Athletic (9)	303
33	Atherton Collieries (9)	3–2	Bacup Borough (10)	146
34	AFC Emley (10)	2–1	Athersley Recreation (9)	319
35	A.F.C. Darwen (9)	3–3	Cammell Laird (9)	120
replay	Cammell Laird (9)	3–2	A.F.C. Darwen (9)	62
36	Abbey Hey (9)	1–3	Bootle (9)	103
37	1874 Northwich (9)	2–1	Barnton (9)	360
38	Worksop Town (9)	4–2	Hallam (10)	421
39	Staveley Miners Welfare (9)	1–2	Winsford United (9)	171
40	Lichfield City (10)	0–0	Wolverhampton Casuals (10)	231
replay	Wolverhampton Casuals (10)	1–2	Lichfield City (10)	100
41	Haughmond (10)	0–2	Alvechurch (9)	127
42	A.F.C. Bridgnorth (10)	0–3	Boldmere St. Michaels (9)	121
43	Heath Hayes (10)	0–3	Bromsgrove Sporting (10)	174
44	Coleshill Town (9)	2–2	Cradley Town (10)	90
replay	Cradley Town (10)	1–4	Coleshill Town (9)	80
45	Brocton (9)	2–1	Walsall Wood (9)	80
46	Lye Town (9)	3–2	AFC Wulfrunians (9)	120
47	Sporting Khalsa (9)	1–1	Hanley Town (9)	86
replay	Hanley Town (9)	1–3	Sporting Khalsa (9)	86
48	Tividale (9)	2–1	Wolverhampton SC (10)	93
49	Coventry Sphinx (9)	0–5	Highgate United (9)	140
50	Stourport Swifts (9)	3–4	Westfields (9)	119
51	Coventry United (9)	1–1	Shawbury United (10)	205
replay	Shawbury United (10)	W.O.	Coventry United (9)	-
Walkover for Coventry United as Shawbury United were removed from list of competing clubs and thus eliminated from the tournament. The club was found to be in breach of FA Cup Rule 11(c)(iii) in that they were at fault for the abandonment of their extra preliminary round replay against Coventry United on Wednesday 10 August 2016. This was caused by Shawbury United deliberately turning off the floodlights with a few minutes remaining when losing 1-0.
52	Dudley Sports (10)	1–1	Nuneaton Griff (10)	84
replay	Nuneaton Griff (10)	3–3 (5–6 p)	Dudley Sports (10)	110
53	Malvern Town (10)	1–2	Rocester (9)	201
54	Brigg Town (10)	2–1	Clipstone (9)	78
55	Oadby Town (9)	1–2	Long Eaton United (9)	117
56	Loughborough University (9)	4–4	Shirebrook Town (10)	113
replay	Shirebrook Town (10)	0–3	Loughborough University (9)	65
57	Bottesford Town (9)	1–0	Radford (10)	74
58	South Normanton Athletic (10)	2–0	Aylestone Park (10)	50
59	Shepshed Dynamo (9)	0–4	AFC Mansfield (9)	168
60	Hinckley (10)	1–1	Heanor Town (9)	308
replay	Heanor Town (9)	5–1	Hinckley (10)	170
61	Blaby & Whetstone Athletic (10)	2–0	St Andrews (9)	68
62	Leicester Nirvana (9)	1–2	Dunkirk (10)	34
63	Anstey Nomads (10)	1–3	Harborough Town (9)	74
64	Retford United (9)	1–1	Leicester Road (10)	125
replay	Leicester Road (10)	4–2	Retford United (9)	94
65	Ashby Ivanhoe (10)	4–3	Quorn (9)	328
66	Bardon Hill (11)	W.O.	Kirby Muxloe (9)	-
Walkover for Kirby Muxloe as Bardon Hill was not accepted into the competition following move to level 11.
67	Rainworth Miners Welfare (9)	1–3	Cleethorpes Town (9)	127
68	Holbeach United (9)	4–1	Swaffham Town (9)	125
69	Boston Town (9)	1–4	Wisbech Town (9)	73
70	Kirkley & Pakefield (9)	0–0	Walsham-le-Willows (9)	74
replay	Walsham-le-Willows (9)	1–2	Kirkley & Pakefield (9)	86
71	Peterborough Sports (9)	8–0	Gorleston (9)	146
72	Harrowby United (9)	2–1	Thetford Town (9)	69
73	Yaxley (9)	12–0	Huntingdon Town (9)	74
74	Ely City (9)	1–4	Deeping Rangers (9)	90
75	Fakenham Town (9)	0–1	Sleaford Town (9)	76
76	Godmanchester Rovers (9)	2–0	Great Yarmouth Town (9)	124
77	Eynesbury Rovers (9)	3–1	Peterborough Northern Star (9)	84
78	Haverhill Rovers (9)	1–2	Hertford Town (9)	257
79	Redbridge (9)	1–5	Waltham Forest (9)	70
80	Brantham Athletic (9)	0–1	Hadley (9)	40
81	Enfield 1893 (9)	2–4	Tower Hamlets (9)	44
82	Clacton (9)	3–5	Eton Manor (9)	93
83	Sporting Bengal United (9)	0–0	Ipswich Wanderers (9)	52
replay	Ipswich Wanderers (9)	0–2	Sporting Bengal United (9)	96
84	Wivenhoe Town (9)	0–2	Hullbridge Sports (9)	99
85	Barkingside (9)	2–1	Hadleigh United (9)	105
86	Whitton United (10)	0–0	Basildon United (9)	49
replay	Basildon United (9)	5–0	Whitton United (10)	72
87	London Bari (9)	1–3	Clapton (9)	296
88	Barking (9)	2–0	Takeley (9)	76
89	Sawbridgeworth Town (9)	0–0	Southend Manor (9)	122
replay	Southend Manor (9)	2–2 (2–4 p)	Sawbridgeworth Town (9)	76

Tie	Home team (tier)	Score	Away team (tier)	Att.
90	Stanway Rovers (9)	1–0	FC Romania (9)	79
91	Ilford (9)	9–0	Burnham Ramblers (9)	47
92	Broxbourne Borough (9)	1–5	Felixstowe & Walton United (9)	72
93	Halstead Town (10)	2–1	Newmarket Town (9)	163
94	St Margaretsbury (9)	2–5	Long Melford (9)	128
95	Hoddesdon Town (9)	1–0	Stansted (9)	98
96	Saffron Walden Town (9)	1–0	Mildenhall Town (9)	289
97	Edgware Town (9)	5–1	Holmer Green (9)	102
98	Flackwell Heath (9)	6–3	Baldock Town (10)	75
99	Crawley Green (9)	2–1	Rothwell Corinthians (9)	81
100	London Tigers (9)	1–1	Sun Sports (9)	60
replay	Sun Sports (9)	2–1	London Tigers (9)	36
101	Leighton Town (9)	1–2	Northampton Sileby Rangers (9)	116
102	Tring Athletic (9)	0–1	Desborough Town (9)	87
103	Wellingborough Town (9)	1–3	Stotfold (9)	114
104	Burnham (9)	0–2	Oxhey Jets (9)	45
105	Cogenhoe United (9)	1–0	Berkhamsted (9)	64
106	Bedford (9)	1–2	Welwyn Garden City (9)	60
107	Cockfosters (9)	1–2	Harpenden Town (10)	62
108	Newport Pagnell Town (9)	0–1	Biggleswade United (9)	146
109	Wembley (9)	4–0	Daventry Town (10)	56
110	Harefield United (10)	1–1	Northampton ON Chenecks (10)	75
replay	Northampton ON Chenecks (10)	1–1 (8–9 p)	Harefield United (10)	64
111	Leverstock Green (9)	1–2	London Colney (9)	99
112	Ascot United (9)	2–0	Milton United (10)	156
113	Abingdon United (10)	0–0	A.F.C. Hayes (9)	45
replay	A.F.C. Hayes (9)	6–1	Abingdon United (10)	59
114	Thame United (9)	3–0	Abbey Rangers (9)	141
115	Binfield (9)	0–1	North Greenford United (9)	96
116	Thatcham Town (9)	2–3	Bracknell Town (9)	109
117	Spelthorne Sports (9)	4–3	Hartley Wintney (9)	90
118	Carterton (9)	1–2	Highmoor Ibis (9)	45
119	Camberley Town (9)	6–1	Cove (10)	81
120	Chertsey Town (9)	2–0	Hook Norton (10)	84
121	Brimscombe & Thrupp (9)	3–1	Henley Town (10)	63
122	Longlevens (9)	4–2	Bedfont & Feltham (9)	178
123	Bedfont Sports (9)	3–2	Windsor (9)	86
124	Ardley United (9)	3–2	Tuffley Rovers (9)	71
125	Highworth Town (9)	2–1	Tadley Calleva (10)	161
126	Andover Town (9)	5–2	Royal Wootton Bassett Town (9)	96
127	Hanworth Villa (9)	2–2	Knaphill (9)	103
replay	Knaphill (9)	2–3	Hanworth Villa (9)	141
128	Fairford Town (10)	1–5	CB Hounslow United (9)	70
129	Horsham YMCA (9)	2–3	Hollands & Blair (9)	98
130	Sevenoaks Town (9)	2–1	Sporting Club Thamesmead (10)	72
131	Holmesdale (10)	0–2	Haywards Heath Town (9)	45
132	Chessington & Hook United (10)	3–1	Wick (9)	133
133	Littlehampton Town (9)	1–3	Pagham (9)	207
134	Hailsham Town (9)	5–7	Crawley Down Gatwick (9)	63
135	Beckenham Town (9)	1–1	Lancing (9)	110
replay	Lancing (9)	3–4	Beckenham Town (9)	128
136	Colliers Wood United (9)	5–2	AFC Croydon Athletic (9)	88
137	Croydon (9)	2–1	AFC Uckfield Town (9)	41
138	Epsom & Ewell (9)	5–2	Gravesham Borough (10)	125
139	Erith & Belvedere (9)	0–1	Loxwood (9)	64
140	Deal Town (9)	0–1	Banstead Athletic (10)	98
141	Peacehaven & Telscombe (9)	3–3	Lordswood (9)	177
replay	Lordswood (9)	1–3	Peacehaven & Telscombe (9)	110
142	Tunbridge Wells (9)	1–1	Eastbourne United (9)	315
replay	Eastbourne United (9)	2–1	Tunbridge Wells (9)	219
143	Newhaven (9)	0–0	Rochester United (9)	119
replay	Rochester United (9)	1–4 (a.e.t.)	Newhaven (9)	99
144	Mile Oak (10)	0–3	Guildford City (9)	91
145	Bridon Ropes (10)	0–3	Canterbury City (9)	210
146	Raynes Park Vale (9)	0–2	Eastbourne Town (9)	50
147	Worthing United (9)	0–3	Shoreham (9)	97
148	East Preston (10)	4–1	Horley Town (9)	110
149	Whitstable Town (9)	4–0	Oakwood (10)	154
150	Southwick (10)	0–4	Cray Valley Paper Mills (9)	84
151	Crowborough Athletic (9)	1–3	Farnham Town (9)	94
152	Redhill (10)	4–1	St Francis Rangers (10)	29
153	Sheppey United (9)	0–1	Badshot Lea (9)	392
154	Ashford United (9)	2–0	Corinthian (9)	235
155	Erith Town (9)	2–2	Sutton Common Rovers (9)	50
replay	Sutton Common Rovers (9)	0–2	Erith Town (9)	92
156	Westfield (Surrey) (9)	0–1	Walton & Hersham (9)	92
157	Arundel (9)	4–3	Chichester City (9)	124
158	Moneyfields (9)	4–3	Christchurch (10)	43
159	Sholing (9)	4–1	Bournemouth (9)	131
160	Bemerton Heath Harlequins (9)	1–0	Keynsham Town (10)	46
161	Cadbury Heath (9)	7–0	Folland Sports (10)	56
162	Hengrove Athletic (10)	2–2	Verwood Town (9)	30
replay	Verwood Town (9)	3–1	Hengrove Athletic (10)	67
163	Oldland Abbotonians (10)	1–0	Newport (IoW) (9)	58
164	Lydney Town (9)	0–6	Team Solent (9)	127
165	Lymington Town (9)	0–0	Hamworthy United (9)	78
replay	Hamworthy United (9)	1–0	Lymington Town (9)	81
166	Bradford Town (9)	1–3	Fareham Town (9)	105
167	Whitchurch United (9)	0–0	Cribbs (9)	50
replay	Cribbs (9)	0–1	Whitchurch United (9)	61
168	Brockenhurst (9)	2–1	Laverstock & Ford (10)	78
169	United Services Portsmouth (10)	2–1	Melksham Town (9)	84
170	Odd Down (9)	2–0	Longwell Green Sports (9)	51
171	Sherborne Town (9)	0–2	Amesbury Town (9)	74
172	Bashley (9)	2–1	Horndean (9)	138
173	Cowes Sports (9)	0–3	Brislington (9)	93
174	Fawley (9)	0–3	AFC Portchester (9)	72
175	Bridport (9)	1–2	Alresford Town (9)	146
176	Blackfield & Langley (9)	2–0	Hallen (9)	59
177	Bristol Manor Farm (9)	1–1	Gillingham Town (9)	111
replay	Gillingham Town (9)	4–3	Bristol Manor Farm (9)	79
178	Welton Rovers (10)	0–2	Bitton (9)	86
179	St Austell (9)	2–2	Street (9)	208
replay	Street (9)	3–0	St Austell (9)	111
180	Clevedon Town (9)	2–1	Ashton & Backwell United (10)	83
181	Wells City (9)	2–2	Portishead Town (10)	64
replay	Portishead Town (10)	2–1	Wells City (9)	65
182	Shepton Mallet (9)	1–1	Willand Rovers (9)	96
replay	Willand Rovers (9)	0–2	Shepton Mallet (9)	94
183	Buckland Athletic (9)	2–3	Plymouth Parkway (10)	184
184	Bodmin Town (10)	2–2	Cheddar (10)	112
replay	Cheddar (10)	2–3 (a.e.t.)	Bodmin Town (10)	362

== Preliminary round ==
Preliminary round fixtures were due to be played on Saturday 20 August 2016, with replays on or before Thursday 25 August 2016. A total of 320 teams took part in this stage of the competition, including the 184 winners from the Extra preliminary round and 136 entering at this stage from the six leagues at Level 8 of English football. The round included 26 teams from Level 10 still in the competition, being the lowest ranked teams in this round.

Tie	Home team (tier)	Score	Away team (tier)	Att.
1	Harrogate Railway Athletic (9)	3–1	Norton & Stockton Ancients (10)	99
2	Billingham Synthonia (10)	6–0	Northallerton Town (10)	119
3	Dunston UTS (9)	3–3	Penrith (9)	188
replay	Penrith (9)	1–2	Dunston UTS (9)	203
4	Shildon (9)	2–0	Kendal Town (8)	150
5	Padiham (9)	1–2	Newcastle Benfield (9)	106
6	Nelson (9)	1–4	Bishop Auckland (9)	80
7	Chester-le-Street Town (9)	0–4	Marske United (9)	152
8	West Auckland Town (9)	1–5	Lancaster City (8)	114
9	Clitheroe (8)	0–1	Consett (9)	187
10	Guisborough Town (9)	2–3	Bridlington Town (9)	160
11	Washington (9)	2–2	Pickering Town (9)	70
replay	Pickering Town (9)	1–2	Washington (9)	151
12	Tadcaster Albion (8)	3–2	Scarborough Athletic (8)	612
13	North Shields (9)	0–1	Morpeth Town (9)	270
14	Droylsden (8)	4–4	Radcliffe Borough (8)	167
replay	Radcliffe Borough (8)	2–1	Droylsden (8)	179
15	Prescot Cables (8)	0–1	Trafford (8)	228
16	Handsworth Parramore (9)	4–1	Stocksbridge Park Steels (8)	129
17	Congleton Town (9)	0–6	Farsley Celtic (8)	148
18	Alsager Town (10)	1–6	Winsford United (9)	125
19	Ramsbottom United (8)	1–2	Sheffield (8)	144
20	Worksop Town (9)	2–2	Ashton Athletic (9)	486
replay	Ashton Athletic (9)	2–2 (4–1 p)	Worksop Town (9)	140
21	Parkgate (9)	1–4	Burscough (8)	53
22	Ossett Town (8)	2–1	Goole (8)	90
23	West Didsbury & Chorlton (9)	2–3	Squires Gate (9)	103
24	Atherton Collieries (9)	1–3	Witton Albion (8)	136
25	Mossley (8)	4–0	Hemsworth Miners Welfare (9)	131
26	Hyde United (8)	4–0	Cammell Laird (9)	204
27	Glossop North End (8)	2–2	Brighouse Town (8)	290
replay	Brighouse Town (8)	4–2	Glossop North End (8)	312
28	Maine Road (9)	3–2	AFC Emley (10)	105
29	Shaw Lane (8)	0–1	Colwyn Bay (8)	139
30	Colne (8)	2–2	1874 Northwich (9)	190
replay	1874 Northwich (9)	1–3	Colne (8)	254
31	Northwich Victoria (8)	2–4	Cheadle Town (10)	101
32	Bamber Bridge (8)	2–5	Ossett Albion (8)	157
33	Pontefract Collieries (10)	2–1	Bootle (9)	84
34	Coleshill Town (9)	4–0	Dudley Sports (10)	59
35	Bedworth United (8)	3–2	Rocester (9)	119
36	Kidsgrove Athletic (8)	2–0	Lye Town (9)	101
37	Coventry United (9)	5–1	Lichfield City (10)	99
38	Hereford (8)	4–2	Alvechurch (9)	2,624
39	Rugby Town (8)	1–0	Bromsgrove Sporting (10)	228
40	Leek Town (8)	3–2	Newcastle Town (8)	262
41	Highgate United (9)	1–0	Boldmere St. Michaels (9)	85
42	Market Drayton Town (8)	0–2	Evesham United (8)	136
43	Sporting Khalsa (9)	1–2	Romulus (8)	84
44	Chasetown (8)	9–0	Brocton (9)	183
45	Westfields (9)	5–1	Tividale (9)	96
46	Dunkirk (10)	2–0	Cleethorpes Town (9)	60
47	Heanor Town (9)	3–2	Long Eaton United (9)	222
48	Lincoln United (8)	2–1	Carlton Town (8)	115
49	Loughborough Dynamo (8)	1–3	Ashby Ivanhoe (10)	115
50	Basford United (8)	2–4	Belper Town (8)	183
51	AFC Mansfield (9)	2–0	South Normanton Athletic (10)	76
52	Brigg Town (10)	2–1	Blaby & Whetstone Athletic (10)	64
53	Leicester Road (10)	3–1	Harborough Town (9)	84
54	Bottesford Town (9)	1–2	Kirby Muxloe (9)	53
55	Loughborough University (9)	1–4	Gresley (8)	150
56	Sleaford Town (9)	0–3	Stamford (8)	183
57	Yaxley (9)	4–4	Dereham Town (8)	122
replay	Dereham Town (8)	1–0	Yaxley (9)	153
58	Soham Town Rangers (8)	4–1	Harrowby United (9)	123
59	Kirkley & Pakefield (9)	3–4	Holbeach United (9)	64
60	Deeping Rangers (9)	2–1	Wroxham (8)	85
61	Wisbech Town (9)	1–4	Peterborough Sports (9)	180
62	Norwich United (8)	1–2	Histon (8)	140
63	Eynesbury Rovers (9)	1–1	Godmanchester Rovers (9)	125
replay	Godmanchester Rovers (9)	1–3	Eynesbury Rovers (9)	147
64	Bury Town (8)	0–3	Spalding United (8)	274
65	Ware (8)	0–2	Maldon & Tiptree (8)	64
66	Thurrock (8)	2–3	Halstead Town (10)	74
67	Witham Town (8)	3–0	Eton Manor (9)	89
68	Waltham Forest (9)	4–0	Hoddesdon Town (9)	48
69	Haringey Borough (8)	7–2	Barkingside (9)	60
70	Waltham Abbey (8)	2–2	Bowers & Pitsea (8)	97
replay	Bowers & Pitsea (8)	2–4	Waltham Abbey (8)	167
71	Brentwood Town (8)	1–2	Tilbury (8)	115
72	Sporting Bengal United (9)	2–0	Clapton (9)	242
73	Long Melford (9)	0–2	Saffron Walden Town (9)	177
74	Romford (8)	4–3	Hullbridge Sports (9)	123
75	Barking (9)	0–0	Stanway Rovers (9)	89
replay	Stanway Rovers (9)	3–2	Barking (9)	75
76	Ilford (9)	0–2	Felixstowe & Walton United (9)	68
77	Brightlingsea Regent (8)	2–1	Great Wakering Rovers (8)	103
78	Sawbridgeworth Town (9)	4–2	Tower Hamlets (9)	37
79	Aveley (8)	0–1	AFC Hornchurch (8)	171
80	Hertford Town (9)	0–1	Hadley (9)	188
81	Royston Town (8)	1–4	Heybridge Swifts (8)	129
82	Cheshunt (8)	8–0	Basildon United (9)	87
83	Kempston Rovers (8)	1–0	Oxhey Jets (9)	97
84	Stotfold (9)	3–2	Welwyn Garden City (9)	108
85	Crawley Green (9)	0–3	Uxbridge (8)	32

Tie	Home team (tier)	Score	Away team (tier)	Att.
86	Bedford Town (8)	1–2	AFC Dunstable (8)	152
87	Sun Sports (9)	2–0	Northwood (8)	74
88	Arlesey Town (8)	1–1	Potters Bar Town (8)	117
replay	Potters Bar Town (8)	4–1	Arlesey Town (8)	122
89	AFC Rushden & Diamonds (8)	4–3	Northampton Sileby Rangers (9)	347
90	Desborough Town (9)	0–1	London Colney (9)	76
91	Chalfont St Peter (8)	2–0	Harpenden Town (10)	74
92	Edgware Town (9)	1–3	Barton Rovers (8)	107
93	Aylesbury United (8)	0–1	Biggleswade United (9)	172
94	Cogenhoe United (9)	1–5	Flackwell Heath (9)	66
95	Beaconsfield Town (8)	2–2	Marlow (8)	204
replay	Marlow (8)	3–3 (3–4 p)	Beaconsfield Town (8)	114
96	Aylesbury (8)	1–3	Hanwell Town (8)	72
97	Wembley (9)	1–1	Harefield United (10)	75
replay	Harefield United (10)	2–1	Wembley (9)	75
98	Bishop's Cleeve (8)	1–1	Camberley Town (9)	63
replay	Camberley Town (9)	2–0	Bishop's Cleeve (8)	129
99	Highmoor Ibis (9)	1–2	Brimscombe & Thrupp (9)	32
100	Thame United (9)	1–7	North Leigh (8)	81
101	Wantage Town (8)	4–2	Hanworth Villa (9)	78
102	North Greenford United (9)	4–1	Kidlington (8)	68
103	CB Hounslow United (9)	2–1	Petersfield Town (8)	191
104	Egham Town (8)	2–1	Bracknell Town (9)	72
105	Spelthorne Sports (9)	2–3	Andover Town (9)	74
106	Farnborough (8)	5–1	Longlevens (9)	213
107	Ascot United (9)	4–3	Didcot Town (8)	77
108	Slimbridge (8)	3–0	Bedfont Sports (9)	46
109	Chertsey Town (9)	3–0	A.F.C. Hayes (9)	67
110	Yate Town (8)	1–2	Fleet Town (8)	125
111	Shortwood United (8)	0–2	Ashford Town (8)	65
112	Ardley United (9)	0–3	Highworth Town (9)	54
113	Canterbury City (9)	1–1	Pagham (9)	62
replay	Pagham (9)	2–1	Canterbury City (9)	143
114	Cray Valley Paper Mills (9)	0–2	Hastings United (8)	192
115	Shoreham (9)	3–4	Dorking Wanderers (8)	93
116	Greenwich Borough (8)	1–1	Walton & Hersham (9)	125
replay	Walton & Hersham (9)	0–3	Greenwich Borough (8)	115
117	Hollands & Blair (9)	1–1	Whyteleafe (8)	128
replay	Whyteleafe (8)	4–2	Hollands & Blair (9)	130
118	Peacehaven & Telscombe (9)	2–0	Haywards Heath Town (9)	160
119	Redhill (10)	1–6	Lewes (8)	273
120	Badshot Lea (9)	0–4	Cray Wanderers (8)	52
121	Crawley Down Gatwick (9)	2–3	Corinthian-Casuals (8)	118
122	Loxwood (9)	0–2	Arundel (9)	62
123	Carshalton Athletic (8)	3–0	Farnham Town (9)	115
124	Whitstable Town (9)	0–0	Eastbourne Town (9)	169
replay	Eastbourne Town (9)	1–1 (3–1 p)	Whitstable Town (9)	141
125	Chipstead (8)	2–1	Beckenham Town (9)	44
126	South Park (8)	2–0	Phoenix Sports (8)	78
127	Eastbourne United (9)	2–2	Newhaven (9)	152
replay	Newhaven (9)	1–2	Eastbourne United (9)	107
128	Ashford United (9)	1–0	Three Bridges (8)	225
129	Herne Bay (8)	1–0	East Grinstead Town (8)	172
130	Molesey (8)	0–2	Godalming Town (8)	79
131	Faversham Town (8)	2–1	Epsom & Ewell (9)	115
132	VCD Athletic (8)	0–0	Croydon (9)	57
replay	Croydon (9)	1–2	VCD Athletic (8)	81
133	Sevenoaks Town (9)	4–2	Horsham (8)	101
134	Tooting & Mitcham United (8)	0–1	East Preston (10)	159
135	Guernsey (8)	2–2	Thamesmead Town (8)	1,142
replay	Thamesmead Town (8)	1–1 (4–2 p)	Guernsey (8)	147
136	Walton Casuals (8)	3–3	Chatham Town (8)	43
replay	Chatham Town (8)	1–2	Walton Casuals (8)	152
137	Ramsgate (8)	1–0	Erith Town (9)	144
138	Banstead Athletic (10)	3–3	Colliers Wood United (9)	58
replay	Colliers Wood United (9)	3–0	Banstead Athletic (10)	101
139	Sittingbourne (8)	1–1	Hythe Town (8)	158
replay	Hythe Town (8)	5–0	Sittingbourne (8)	209
140	Guildford City (9)	1–1	Chessington & Hook United (10)	91
replay	Chessington & Hook United (10)	1–2	Guildford City (9)	138
141	Gillingham Town (9)	2–0	AFC Totton (8)	144
142	Bashley (9)	1–2	Sholing (9)	179
143	Amesbury Town (9)	1–3	Bemerton Heath Harlequins (9)	64
144	Blackfield & Langley (9)	1–2	Paulton Rovers (8)	78
145	Cadbury Heath (9)	4–1	Team Solent (9)	48
146	AFC Portchester (9)	2–0	Mangotsfield United (8)	102
147	Whitchurch United (9)	0–3	Moneyfields (9)	44
148	Wimborne Town (8)	1–1	Alresford Town (9)	238
replay	Alresford Town (9)	1–0 (a.e.t.)	Wimborne Town (8)	142
149	United Services Portsmouth (10)	0–3	Winchester City (8)	88
150	Verwood Town (9)	2–2	Fareham Town (9)	40
replay	Fareham Town (9)	4–0	Verwood Town (9)	95
151	Swindon Supermarine (8)	5–1	Odd Down (9)	132
152	Oldland Abbotonians (10)	2–3	Brislington (9)	77
153	Hamworthy United (9)	2–1	Brockenhurst (9)	118
154	Salisbury (8)	5–0	Bitton (9)	561
155	Street (9)	4–2	Larkhall Athletic (8)	96
156	Bideford (8)	1–1	Bodmin Town (10)	205
replay	Bodmin Town (10)	1–2	Bideford (8)	200
157	Taunton Town (8)	4–4	Tiverton Town (8)	432
replay	Tiverton Town (8)	0–2	Taunton Town (8)	406
158	Bridgwater Town (8)	0–6	Plymouth Parkway (10)	160
159	Portishead Town (10)	2–0	Shepton Mallet (9)	77
160	Clevedon Town (9)	0–1	Barnstaple Town (8)	69

== First qualifying round ==
First qualifying round fixtures were due to be played on Saturday 3 September 2016, with replays taking place no later than Thursday 8 September 2016. A total of 232 teams took part in this stage of the competition, including the 160 winners from the Preliminary round and 72 entering at this stage from the three leagues at Level 7 of English football. The round included twelve teams from Level 10 still in the competition, being the lowest ranked teams in this round.

Tie	Home team (tier)	Score	Away team (tier)	Att.
1	Washington (9)	2–5	Shildon (9)	157
2	Ashton United (7)	0–3	Nantwich Town (7)	213
3	Brighouse Town (8)	0–3	Lancaster City (8)	380
4	Blyth Spartans (7)	3–1	Frickley Athletic (7)	667
5	Hyde United (8)	1–0	Colne (8)	271
6	Bishop Auckland (9)	5–1	Ossett Albion (8)	328
7	Whitby Town (7)	3–3	Winsford United (9)	239
replay	Winsford United (9)	1–2	Whitby Town (7)	270
8	Sheffield (8)	0–3	Farsley Celtic (8)	323
9	Marske United (9)	0–2	Marine (7)	264
10	Newcastle Benfield (9)	0–2	Bridlington Town (9)	107
11	Morpeth Town (9)	4–2	Colwyn Bay (8)	220
12	Harrogate Railway Athletic (9)	0–5	Consett (9)	168
13	Dunston UTS (9)	2–2	Skelmersdale United (7)	249
replay	Skelmersdale United (7)	1–2	Dunston UTS (9)	223
14	Ashton Athletic (9)	7–2	Mossley (8)	152
15	Squires Gate (9)	2–5	Handsworth Parramore (9)	98
16	Witton Albion (8)	3–0	Buxton (7)	324
17	Billingham Synthonia (10)	2–2	Ossett Town (8)	165
replay	Ossett Town (8)	3–2	Billingham Synthonia (10)	132
18	Pontefract Collieries (10)	2–3	Tadcaster Albion (8)	362
19	Burscough (8)	4–3	Maine Road (9)	116
20	Trafford (8)	5–2	Cheadle Town (10)	318
21	Workington (7)	3–0	Warrington Town (7)	448
22	Radcliffe Borough (8)	3–5	Spennymoor Town (7)	175
23	Leek Town (8)	2–3	Kettering Town (7)	416
24	Hednesford Town (7)	1–2	Belper Town (8)	391
25	King's Lynn Town (7)	6–1	Brigg Town (10)	511
26	AFC Mansfield (9)	2–1	Stratford Town (7)	95
27	Rushall Olympic (7)	2–2	Soham Town Rangers (8)	161
replay	Soham Town Rangers (8)	0–1	Rushall Olympic (7)	169
28	Matlock Town (7)	4–2	Heanor Town (9)	421
29	Chasetown (8)	1–1	Grantham Town (7)	233
replay	Grantham Town (7)	2–2 (5–6 p)	Chasetown (8)	261
30	Evesham United (8)	2–2	Barwell (7)	237
replay	Barwell (7)	2–0	Evesham United (8)	204
31	Peterborough Sports (9)	1–3	Stourbridge (7)	206
32	Ashby Ivanhoe (10)	0–6	Ilkeston (7)	693
33	St Neots Town (7)	1–1	Stamford (8)	351
replay	Stamford (8)	4–1	St Neots Town (7)	273
34	Westfields (9)	4–0	St Ives Town (7)	190
35	Lincoln United (8)	6–1	Dunkirk (10)	161
36	Halesowen Town (7)	3–0	Coleshill Town (9)	376
37	Highgate United (9)	3–1	Leamington (7)	231
38	Leicester Road (10)	0–0	Kirby Muxloe (9)	159
replay	Kirby Muxloe (9)	3–2 (a.e.t.)	Leicester Road (10)	136
39	Coalville Town (7)	2–1	Redditch United (7)	161
40	Coventry United (9)	0–2	Bedworth United (8)	347
41	Mickleover Sports (7)	3–2	Spalding United (8)	172
42	Deeping Rangers (9)	2–6	Gresley (8)	152
43	Romulus (8)	1–1	Hereford (8)	713
replay	Hereford (8)	3–0	Romulus (8)	2,240
44	Rugby Town (8)	1–0	Corby Town (7)	312
45	Dereham Town (9)	2–1	Holbeach United (9)	191
46	Eynesbury Rovers (9)	1–3	Sutton Coldfield Town (7)	195
47	Stafford Rangers (7)	1–2	Kidsgrove Athletic (8)	659
48	Brightlingsea Regent (8)	1–2	Billericay Town (7)	146
49	Hadley (9)	1–0	London Colney (9)	103
50	Haringey Borough (8)	0–3	Witham Town (8)	136
51	Kempston Rovers (8)	3–2	Harefield United (10)	138
52	Hanwell Town (8)	1–0	Enfield Town (7)	212
53	Sun Sports (9)	0–2	Hayes & Yeading United (7)	155
54	Hendon (7)	5–2	Cheshunt (8)	257
55	Maldon & Tiptree (8)	0–1	Biggleswade Town (7)	115
56	Heybridge Swifts (8)	2–2	AFC Dunstable (8)	103
replay	AFC Dunstable (8)	2–1	Heybridge Swifts (8)	117
57	Chesham United (7)	5–0	Saffron Walden Town (9)	325

Tie	Home team (tier)	Score	Away team (tier)	Att.
58	Harrow Borough (7)	4–1	Sawbridgeworth Town (9)	118
59	AFC Sudbury (7)	6–0	Halstead Town (10)	420
60	Kings Langley (7)	6–1	Sporting Bengal United (9)	101
61	Felixstowe & Walton United (9)	2–1	Tilbury (8)	247
62	Chalfont St Peter (8)	0–3	Potters Bar Town (8)	130
63	Uxbridge (8)	2–0	Needham Market (7)	109
64	Cambridge City (7)	3–1	Flackwell Heath (9)	136
65	Harlow Town (7)	3–1	Romford (8)	313
66	Stanway Rovers (9)	0–1	Barton Rovers (8)	87
67	Canvey Island (7)	2–1	Dunstable Town (7)	238
68	Hitchin Town (7)	4–2	Biggleswade United (9)	708
69	Leiston (7)	4–1	Grays Athletic (7)	253
70	Waltham Forest (9)	2–1	Stotfold (9)	95
71	AFC Rushden & Diamonds (8)	2–0	AFC Hornchurch (8)	436
72	Lowestoft Town (7)	0–2	Histon (8)	407
73	Waltham Abbey (8)	0–5	Wingate & Finchley (7)	130
74	Colliers Wood United (9)	5–1	Eastbourne Town (9)	102
75	Hythe Town (8)	1–0	Leatherhead (7)	255
76	East Preston (10)	1–4	Merstham (7)	158
77	Camberley Town (9)	0–2	Hastings Town (8)	179
78	South Park (8)	2–1	Dorking Wanderers (8)	274
79	Walton Casuals (8)	3–2	Greenwich Borough (8)	71
80	Burgess Hill Town (7)	2–1	Ashford United (9)	365
81	Fleet Town (8)	1–1	Slimbridge (8)	111
replay	Slimbridge (8)	1–0 (a.e.t.)	Fleet Town (8)	119
82	Andover Town (9)	0–5	Farnborough (8)	256
83	Brimscombe & Thrupp (9)	3–0	Peacehaven & Telscombe (9)	162
84	Staines Town (7)	4–0	Godalming Town (8)	241
85	CB Hounslow United (9)	1–3	Metropolitan Police (7)	91
86	Herne Bay (8)	3–1	Ashford Town (8)	217
87	Eastbourne United (9)	0–3	Highworth Town (9)	139
88	Faversham Town (8)	1–0	Cray Wanderers (8)	195
89	Pagham (9)	0–3	Dulwich Hamlet (7)	230
90	Ascot United (9)	2–2	Tonbridge Angels (7)	430
replay	Tonbridge Angels (7)	7–0	Ascot United (9)	376
91	Arundel (9)	1–5	Egham Town (8)	122
92	Worthing (7)	3–3	Carshalton Athletic (8)	561
replay	Carshalton Athletic (8)	2–6	Worthing (7)	286
93	Lewes (8)	0–0	Sevenoaks Town (9)	490
replay	Sevenoaks Town (9)	2–1	Lewes (8)	280
94	Wantage Town (8)	1–1	Beaconsfield Town (8)	80
replay	Beaconsfield Town (8)	6–1	Wantage Town (8)	118
95	VCD Athletic (8)	4–1	Kingstonian (7)	98
96	Slough Town (7)	6–1	Chipstead (8)	472
97	Thamesmead Town (8)	1–0	Chertsey Town (9)	78
98	Corinthian-Casuals (8)	2–3	North Leigh (8)	168
99	Folkestone Invicta (7)	3–1	North Greenford United (9)	337
100	Bognor Regis Town (7)	5–1	Guildford City (9)	396
101	Ramsgate (8)	1–2	Whyteleafe (8)	196
102	Taunton Town (8)	2–0	Cinderford Town (7)	242
103	Alresford Town (9)	1–1	Fareham Town (9)	100
replay	Fareham Town (9)	2–4	Alresford Town (9)	167
104	Barnstaple Town (8)	0–4	Merthyr Town (7)	210
105	Weymouth (7)	A–A	Paulton Rovers (8)	393
Match abandoned after 50 minutes due to waterlogged pitch.
rematch	Weymouth (7)	1–0	Paulton Rovers (8)	472
106	Winchester City (8)	4–2	Street (9)	154
107	Sholing (9)	0–2	Havant & Waterlooville (7)	301
108	Salisbury (8)	2–0	Frome Town (7)	832
109	Portishead Town (10)	1–4	Swindon Supermarine (8)	166
110	Gillingham Town (9)	0–2	Cirencester Town (7)	110
111	Cadbury Heath (9)	3–0	Plymouth Parkway (10)	86
112	Chippenham Town (7)	9–0	Moneyfields (9)	282
113	Basingstoke Town (7)	4–0	Bemerton Heath Harlequins (9)	237
114	Dorchester Town (7)	0–3	Banbury United (7)	249
115	Bideford (8)	1–2	AFC Portchester (9)	189
116	Brislington (9)	5–2	Hamworthy United (9)	60

== Second qualifying round ==
Second qualifying round fixtures were due to be played on Saturday 17 September 2016, with replays no later than Thursday 22 September 2016. A total of 160 teams took part in this stage of the competition, including the 116 winners from the first qualifying round and 44 entering at this stage from the two leagues at Level 6 of English football. The round included 23 teams from Level 9 still in the competition, being the lowest ranked teams in this round.

Tie	Home team (tier)	Score	Away team (tier)	Att.
1	Bridlington Town (9)	1–1	Harrogate Town (6)	298
replay	Harrogate Town (6)	3–2	Bridlington Town (9)	446
2	Handsworth Parramore (9)	2–0	Burscough (8)	98
3	Witton Albion (8)	1–1	Stalybridge Celtic (6)	316
replay	Stalybridge Celtic (6)	2–1	Witton Albion (8)	241
4	Blyth Spartans (7)	2–4	Morpeth Town (9)	1,045
5	Bishop Auckland (9)	1–0	Trafford (8)	457
6	Nantwich Town (7)	2–2	Marine (7)	403
replay	Marine (7)	2–3	Nantwich Town (7)	279
7	Ashton Athletic (9)	0–5	F.C. Halifax Town (6)	479
8	Curzon Ashton (6)	1–1	Consett (9)	208
replay	Consett (9)	0–1	Curzon Ashton (6)	709
9	Altrincham (6)	3–2	Gainsborough Trinity (6)	516
10	Kidsgrove Athletic (8)	1–2	Matlock Town (7)	257
11	Lancaster City (8)	2–1	Darlington 1883 (6)	580
12	Alfreton Town (6)	1–0	A.F.C. Fylde (6)	263
13	Tadcaster Albion (8)	0–2	Farsley Celtic (8)	464
14	Bradford Park Avenue (6)	0–1	Salford City (6)	427
15	Workington (7)	3–1	Shildon (9)	563
16	Dunston UTS (9)	0–2	Chorley (6)	333
17	Stockport County (6)	2–0	Hyde United (8)	1,425
18	Ossett Town (8)	1–7	F.C. United of Manchester (6)	694
19	Spennymoor Town (7)	1–0	Whitby Town (7)	607
20	Rushall Olympic (7)	1–2	Kettering Town (7)	241
21	Kirby Muxloe (9)	1–2	Boston United (6)	330
22	Sutton Coldfield Town (7)	2–3	Hereford (8)	823
23	Brackley Town (6)	6–0	Rugby Town (8)	305
24	Coalville Town (7)	0–1	AFC Mansfield (9)	139
25	Mickleover Sports (7)	1–2	Stourbridge (7)	256
26	Westfields (9)	4–2	Highgate United (9)	239
27	Kidderminster Harriers (6)	4–0	Tamworth (6)	1,050
28	Nuneaton Town (6)	1–2	Lincoln United (8)	438
29	Halesowen Town (7)	1–0	Belper Town (8)	318
30	Gresley (8)	1–1	Stamford (8)	294
replay	Stamford (8)	1–0	Gresley (8)	314
31	Barwell (7)	0–1	Ilkeston (7)	214
32	Chasetown (8)	0–1	Bedworth United (8)	334
33	Worcester City (6)	0–0	A.F.C. Telford United (6)	721
replay	A.F.C. Telford United (6)	1–3	Worcester City (6)	661
34	Sevenoaks Town (9)	2–2	Chesham United (7)	426
replay	Chesham United (7)	2–1	Sevenoaks Town (9)	273
35	Concord Rangers (6)	1–3	AFC Rushden & Diamonds (8)	192
36	Beaconsfield Town (8)	3–1	Witham Town (8)	84
37	Egham Town (8)	2–1	VCD Athletic (8)	78
38	Dulwich Hamlet (7)	0–2	Hendon (7)	822
39	Hythe Town (8)	2–4	Walton Casuals (8)	221
40	Dereham Town (8)	1–2	St Albans City (6)	243

Tie	Home team (tier)	Score	Away team (tier)	Att.
41	Wingate & Finchley (7)	0–3	Tonbridge Angels (7)	167
42	AFC Dunstable (8)	1–7	Hampton & Richmond Borough (6)	173
43	Wealdstone (6)	4–0	Histon (8)	327
44	Chelmsford City (6)	2–3	Dartford (6)	675
45	Staines Town (7)	1–0	Maidenhead United (6)	414
46	Hayes & Yeading United (7)	0–2	Worthing (7)	175
47	Hemel Hempstead Town (6)	1–1	Herne Bay (8)	320
replay	Herne Bay (8)	1–5	Hemel Hempstead Town (6)	262
48	Eastbourne Borough (6)	2–1	Metropolitan Police (7)	441
49	Kempston Rovers (8)	1–1	Burgess Hill Town (7)	167
replay	Burgess Hill Town (7)	3–1	Kempston Rovers (8)	258
50	South Park (8)	1–4	Leiston (7)	124
51	Hadley (9)	2–1	Kings Langley (7)	125
52	Ebbsfleet United (6)	5–0	AFC Sudbury (7)	855
53	Felixstowe & Walton United (9)	2–1	Bishop's Stortford (6)	416
54	Cambridge City (7)	1–3	Slough Town (7)	205
55	Folkestone Invicta (7)	3–1	Waltham Forest (9)	290
56	Uxbridge (8)	1–2	Harrow Borough (7)	178
57	East Thurrock United (6)	2–3	Whitehawk (6)	223
58	Canvey Island (7)	2–2	Potters Bar Town (8)	251
replay	Potters Bar Town (8)	3–2	Canvey Island (7)	218
59	Whyteleafe (8)	0–2	Welling United (6)	231
60	King's Lynn Town (7)	1–0	Harlow Town (7)	674
61	Billericay Town (7)	2–1	Bognor Regis Town (7)	336
62	Faversham Town (8)	2–2	Hitchin Town (7)	295
replay	Hitchin Town (7)	0–1	Faversham Town (8)	251
63	Hanwell Town (8)	1–1	Thamesmead Town (8)	146
replay	Thamesmead Town (8)	4–2 (a.e.t.)	Hanwell Town (8)	84
64	Merstham (7)	0–0	Colliers Wood United (9)	148
replay	Colliers Wood United (9)	1–2 (a.e.t.)	Merstham (7)	146
65	Margate (6)	2–0	Biggleswade Town (7)	466
66	Barton Rovers (8)	0–1	Hastings United (8)	145
67	Swindon Supermarine (8)	1–0	Farnborough (8)	209
68	Winchester City (8)	4–0	Truro City (6)	210
69	Havant & Waterlooville (7)	5–1	Highworth Town (9)	329
70	Alresford Town (9)	1–3	Cadbury Heath (9)	138
71	Chippenham Town (7)	4–1	Poole Town (6)	436
72	Salisbury (8)	1–2	Gloucester City (6)	945
73	Cirencester Town (7)	1–6	Banbury United (7)	155
74	Basingstoke Town (7)	0–1	Hungerford Town (6)	347
75	Weymouth (7)	3–2	Gosport Borough (6)	527
76	AFC Portchester (9)	0–2	Merthyr Town (7)	237
77	Taunton Town (8)	2–0	Slimbridge (8)	375
78	Brislington (9)	1–2	Brimscombe & Thrupp (9)	110
79	Bath City (6)	1–1	Oxford City (6)	482
replay	Oxford City (6)	1–2 (a.e.t.)	Bath City (6)	228
80	North Leigh (8)	2–1	Weston-super-Mare (6)	175

== Third qualifying round ==
Third qualifying round fixtures were due to be played on Saturday 1 October 2016, with replays taking place no later than Thursday 6 October 2016. A total of 80 teams took part in this stage of the competition, all winners from the second qualifying round. The round included nine teams from Level 9 still in the competition, being the lowest ranked teams in this round.

Tie	Home team (tier)	Score	Away team (tier)	Att.
1	Halesowen Town (7)	1–1	Nantwich Town (7)	534
replay	Nantwich Town (7)	2–1	Halesowen Town (7)	362
2	Kettering Town (7)	2–0	Boston United (6)	628
3	Lincoln United (8)	3–1	Handsworth Parramore (9)	318
4	Farsley Celtic (8)	0–1	Bishop Auckland (9)	357
5	F.C. Halifax Town (6)	2–1	Stalybridge Celtic (6)	964
6	Worcester City (6)	0–3	Brackley Town (6)	628
7	King's Lynn Town (7)	0–2	Alfreton Town (6)	847
8	Curzon Ashton (6)	4–0	Bedworth United (8)	207
9	Ilkeston (7)	1–2	Stourbridge (7)	413
10	Lancaster City (8)	2–3	Kidderminster Harriers (6)	570
11	Matlock Town (7)	1–1	Workington (7)	489
replay	Workington (7)	1–3	Matlock Town (7)	562
12	Stockport County (6)	2–0	Salford City (6)	3,181
13	Spennymoor Town (7)	1–0	Chorley (6)	713
14	F.C. United of Manchester (6)	3–3	Harrogate Town (6)	1,541
replay	Harrogate Town (6)	2–0	F.C. United of Manchester (6)	881
15	Altrincham (6)	3–0	Morpeth Town (9)	658
16	AFC Mansfield (9)	1–2	Stamford (8)	220
17	Faversham Town (8)	1–1	Egham Town (8)	442
replay	Egham Town (8)	1–0	Faversham Town (8)	187
18	North Leigh (8)	3–1	Folkestone Invicta (7)	202
19	Ebbsfleet United (6)	7–0	Havant & Waterlooville (7)	742
20	Hungerford Town (6)	1–4	Leiston (7)	245

Tie	Home team (tier)	Score	Away team (tier)	Att.
21	Potters Bar Town (8)	0–0	Bath City (6)	338
replay	Bath City (6)	1–1 (3–4 p)	Potters Bar Town (8)	465
22	Hendon (7)	3–0	AFC Rushden & Diamonds (8)	417
23	Margate (6)	2–2	Hastings United (8)	385
replay	Hastings United (8)	1–2 (a.e.t.)	Margate (6)	530
24	Taunton Town (8)	2–1	Hampton & Richmond Borough (6)	630
25	Weymouth (7)	6–0	Brimscombe & Thrupp (9)	643
26	St Albans City (6)	6–0	Worthing (7)	678
27	Wealdstone (6)	2–1	Banbury United (7)	457
28	Tonbridge Angels (7)	4–2	Hereford (8)	1,112
29	Beaconsfield Town (8)	3–0	Felixstowe & Walton United (9)	273
30	Whitehawk (6)	2–0	Merthyr Town (7)	292
31	Chesham United (7)	2–0	Staines Town (7)	354
32	Burgess Hill Town (7)	6–1	Cadbury Heath (9)	333
33	Slough Town (7)	2–3	Dartford (6)	733
34	Billericay Town (7)	3–2	Chippenham Town (7)	482
35	Welling United (6)	7–1	Swindon Supermarine (8)	325
36	Gloucester City (6)	2–2	Hemel Hempstead Town (6)	489
replay	Hemel Hempstead Town (6)	2–0	Gloucester City (6)	388
37	Westfields (9)	4–0	Walton Casuals (8)	349
38	Eastbourne Borough (6)	0–0	Hadley (9)	416
replay	Hadley (9)	1–4	Eastbourne Borough (6)	302
39	Merstham (7)	5–1	Thamesmead Town (8)	188
40	Harrow Borough (7)	2–1	Winchester City (8)	177

== Fourth qualifying round ==
Fourth qualifying round fixtures were due to be played on Saturday 15 October 2016, with replays taking place no later than Thursday 20 October 2016. A total of 64 teams took part in this stage of the competition, including the 40 winners from the third qualifying round and 24 entering at this stage from the Conference Premier at Level 5 of English football. Bishop Auckland and Westfields of level 9 were the lowest ranked teams in this round.

Tie	Home team (tier)	Score	Away team (tier)	Att.
1	Southport (5)	1–0	Chester (5)	1,674
2	Alfreton Town (6)	2–2	Gateshead (5)	457
replay	Gateshead (5)	2–3 (a.e.t.)	Alfreton Town (6)	465
3	North Ferriby United (5)	1–4	Macclesfield Town (5)	395
4	Harrogate Town (6)	0–2	F.C. Halifax Town (6)	1,791
5	Stockport County (6)	2–0	Bishop Auckland (9)	2,770
6	Barrow (5)	2–1	Tranmere Rovers (5)	2,133
7	Nantwich Town (7)	1–3	Stourbridge (7)	755
8	Altrincham (6)	3–1	Matlock Town (7)	1,071
9	Lincoln City (5)	0–0	Guiseley (5)	2,692
replay	Guiseley (5)	1–2	Lincoln City (5)	765
10	Lincoln United (8)	0–3	Spennymoor Town (7)	578
11	Stamford (8)	1–1	Wrexham (5)	1,264
replay	Wrexham (5)	2–3 (a.e.t.)	Stamford (8)	1,598
12	York City (5)	1–1	Curzon Ashton (6)	1,307
replay	Curzon Ashton (6)	2–1	York City (5)	467
13	Welling United (6)	0–1	Whitehawk (6)	515
14	Westfields (9)	2–1	Leiston (7)	741
15	Sutton United (5)	2–1	Forest Green Rovers (5)	751
16	Chesham United (7)	1–0	Potters Bar Town (8)	777

Tie	Home team (tier)	Score	Away team (tier)	Att.
17	Dagenham & Redbridge (5)	3–1	Wealdstone (6)	1,224
18	Torquay United (5)	1–1	Woking (5)	1,348
replay	Woking (5)	2–1	Torquay United (5)	791
19	Taunton Town (8)	0–0	Hemel Hempstead Town (6)	1,282
replay	Hemel Hempstead Town (6)	0–1	Taunton Town (8)	631
20	Braintree Town (5)	4–2	Bromley (5)	343
21	Beaconsfield Town (8)	0–5	Brackley Town (6)	495
22	Tonbridge Angels (7)	0–3	Dartford (6)	1,391
23	Egham Town (8)	0–1	St Albans City (6)	327
24	Boreham Wood (5)	3–0	Hendon (7)	457
25	Aldershot Town (5)	1–2	Eastbourne Borough (6)	1,443
26	Harrow Borough (7)	2–2	Margate (6)	309
replay	Margate (6)	1–3	Harrow Borough (7)	574
27	Maidstone United (5)	3–1	Billericay Town (7)	1,428
28	Kidderminster Harriers (6)	6–0	Weymouth (7)	1,382
29	Solihull Moors (5)	3–1	Kettering Town (7)	769
30	Burgess Hill Town (7)	0–5	Dover Athletic (5)	629
31	Merstham (7)	2–1	Ebbsfleet United (6)	646
32	Eastleigh (5)	6–0	North Leigh (8)	889

== Competition proper ==
Winners from the fourth qualifying round advanced to the First round proper, where teams from League One (Level 3) and League Two (Level 4) of English football, operating in the English Football League, first enter the competition.
