= Gedling Miners Welfare F.C. =

Association football club in England

Coordinates: 52°59′20.72″N 1°06′45.54″W

Gedling Miners Welfare
- Full name: Gedling Miners Welfare Football Club
- Nickname: The Miners
- Founded: 1919 (as Gedling)
- Ground: Plains Road; Mapperley, Nottingham
- Capacity: 2,000
- Chairman: Vic Hulme
- Manager: Ruben Wiggins-Thomas
- League: United Counties League Division One
- 2024–25: United Counties League Division One, 7th of 19
- Website: pitchero.com/clubs/gedlingminerswelfare
Home colours	Away colours

Gedling Miners Welfare Football Club is a semi-professional football club based in Mapperley, Nottingham, England. The club was founded in 1919 as the works team for Gedling Colliery, but it went into abeyance in 1935 due to a lack of support. It was reformed in 1941 and quickly entered its most successful period, earning recognition from the national press as Nottinghamshire's leading amateur team by the mid-1950s. However, Gedling's reputation declined over the following decade, and the club spent many years in relative obscurity. In 2003, Gedling joined the nationwide league system, and the team currently competes in the United Counties League (UCL) Division One at the tenth tier of the English football pyramid.

Gedling has hosted home matches at Plains Road since 1942. Before transferring to the UCL in 2021, the club competed in the East Midlands Counties Football League (EMCFL) Premier Division and two Central Midlands Football League (CML) divisions. National tournament records include reaching the second round of the FA Amateur Cup in 1953–54, 1955–56 and 1956–57; the second qualifying round of the FA Cup in 1949–50 and 1954–55; and the first round of the FA Vase in 2007–08, 2014–15 and 2023–24. The team are nicknamed "the Miners" and their colours are primarily yellow and blue.

== History ==
=== First club, 1919–1935 ===
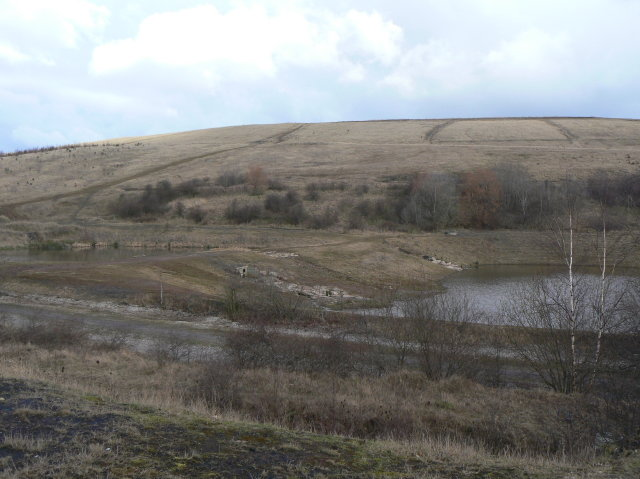
The former site of Gedling Colliery (pictured in 2009)

Work began on Gedling Colliery in 1899 and in 1902 it started to produce coal. The mine's works football team was founded as Gedling in 1919, the same year as the amateur Notts Alliance League reformed after World War I. "Anxious to compete" in the league, Gedling was elected for the 1919–20 season. After a weak start, the Nottingham Journal reported that the team was "one of the strongest sides in the Notts Alliance". Gedling finished third and beat Sneinton 1–0 to win the Notts Alliance Cup.

The club changed its name to Gedling Colliery for 1923–24. Debuting in the FA Amateur Cup, Gedling lost 3–1 to Stapleford Brookhill in the first qualifying round. The team also participated in 1924–25 and 1927–28, but were both times eliminated at the same stage. Gedling debuted in the FA Cup in 1925–26, reaching the first qualifying round before falling 6–1 to Boots Athletic. The team matched this run when they again competed in 1926–27. Regional football held mixed fortunes. While Gedling lost the 1923–24 Notts Alliance Cup final 2–0 to Ransome & Marles, it later led the league for a period of 1927–28.

The club again changed its title to Mapperley St. Jude's for 1930–31. Now overseen by a local church, players participated in bespoke services. St. Jude's entered Division Two of the Notts Alliance for 1932–33 and shortened its name to Mapperley ahead of the following season. Although hampered by poor form and a lack of reputation, the Nottingham Evening Post wrote that the club was "serving up good football" and that its officials were optimistic. In July 1934, Mapperley paid a £21 debt incurred in 1932, leaving a balance of £3 5s. (Note: £21 and £3 5s in 1934 equated approximately to £1,770 and £274, respectively, in 2022; these figures are calculated from the increase in Retail Price Index (RPI) percentage between the two years.) By March 1935, an extra £3 was needed. (Note: £3 in 1935 equated approximately to £247 in 2022; this figure is calculated from the increase in Retail Price Index (RPI) percentage between the two years.) Mapperley conceded that its "financial position was definitely bad" and locals fundraised to save it. The club had folded by late May, claiming a lack of support had forced it into abeyance.

=== Second club, 1941–present ===
==== League and cup success, 1941–1962 ====
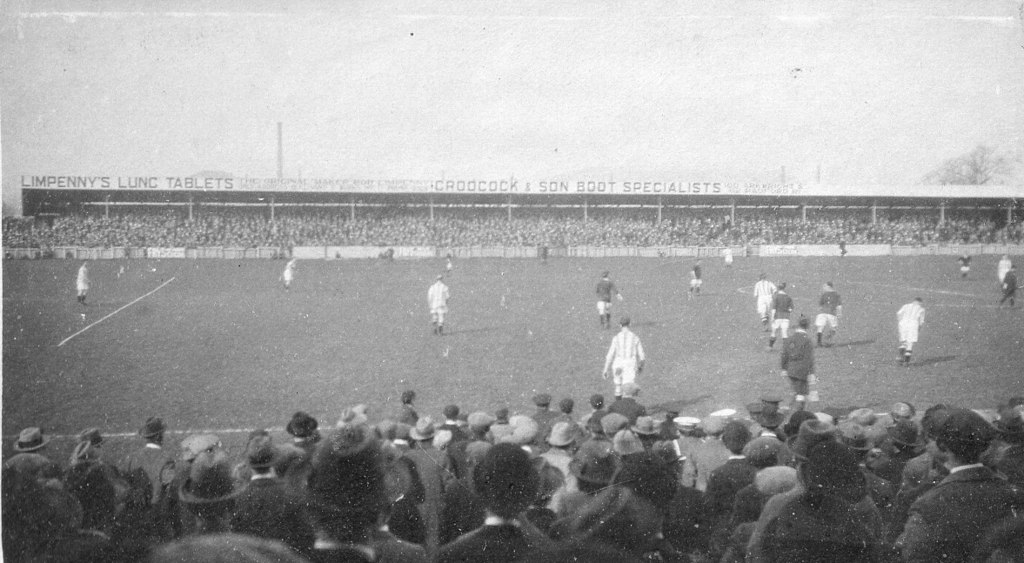
The City Ground (pictured c. 1921), where Gedling won Division Two of the Notts Amateur League in 1944–45.

In a bid to increase production amid World War II, the mine revived the club as Gedling Colliery in October 1941 and saw it enter Division One of the Notts Wartime League in 1942–43. During the next season, the team went unbeaten for the first half of the campaign before topping the division on goal difference. Continuing in the Wartime League, the club also joined Division Two of the Notts Amateur League in 1944–45. In the latter league, the team again finished level at the top, this time with a side from RAF Newton. Gedling then won a tie-breaker replay 2–1 at the City Ground, beating a Newton team that included Poland international Gerard Wodarz to claim the title.

Gedling won Division One of the Notts Amateur League in 1945–46 and thereafter began its most successful period. The following season, the club transferred to Division One of the Notts Alliance League and, under chairman-trainer George Lavender, topped it on seven occasions (1949–50, 1950–51, 1951–52, 1953–54, 1955–56, 1956–57, 1957–58). (Note: Gedling shared the 1956–57 Notts Alliance League Division One title with Eastwood Town after finishing level on points.) The Notts Alliance restructured in 1958, after which Gedling won the pinnacle Senior Division a further three times (1958–59, 1959–60, 1960–61). The team complemented this record with six Notts Alliance Cup wins (1949–50, 1952–53, 1956–57, 1957–58, 1959–60, 1961–62) and were thrice beaten finalists (1946–47, 1953–54, 1955–56). They were likewise defeated in three Nottinghamshire Senior Cup finals (1945–46, 1946–47, 1947–48) before lifting the trophy in 1952–53.

Gedling returned to the FA Amateur Cup in 1946–47, but lost to Maltby Main in the first qualifying round. The team set a club record in 1953–54 by reaching the second round proper, where they hosted reigning champions Pegasus. Ahead of the match, the players were coached by Nottingham Forest manager Billy Walker. Pegasus won 6–1; sportswriter Alan Hoby noted that "it was 'massacre' but, for fifteen glorious minutes, the miners' grit matched the skill of amateur soccer's top team". Gedling, described in the Daily Mirror as "Nottinghamshire's leading amateur team", again reached the second round in 1955–56 and 1956–57. They were beaten both times, 4–1 and 5–1, respectively, by titleholders Bishop Auckland. Gedling also re-entered the FA Cup in 1947–48 before bowing out 5–3 to Boston United in the first qualifying round. The team set and matched a club record when they reached the second qualifying round in both 1949–50 and 1954–55, losing 5–2 and 3–2 to Spalding United and Gresley Rovers, respectively.

==== Decline and obscurity, 1962–2002 ====
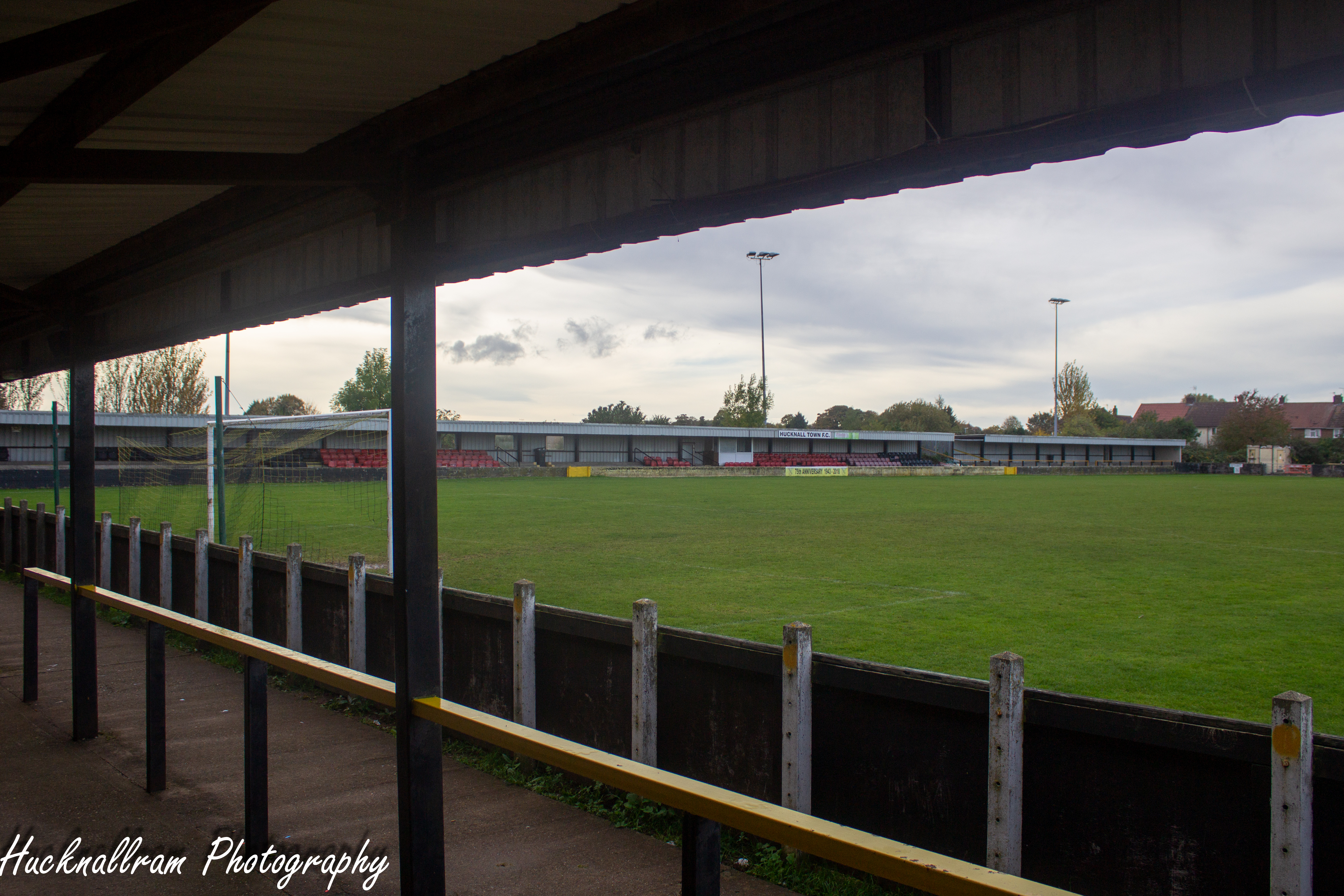
Gedling lost the 1978–79 Notts Alliance Cup final to Hucknall Colliery Welfare (Hucknall's Watnall Road ground pictured in 2022).

Gedling's reputation had waned by the mid-1960s as it ceased to compete in the FA Amateur Cup. In a "vast improvement" according to Nottingham's Football Post, the club finished fifth in the Senior Division of the Notts Alliance in 1966–67. Conversely, by 1970–71, the same newspaper argued that the team "in the past few seasons have lost a lot of their former glory". The club narrowly avoided relegation in 1973–74 under manager Walter Kirk before showing signs of improvement in 1975–76 and 1976–77, the latter under player-manager Mike Connelly. While consistently placing mid-table in the league, the team were beaten finalists in both the 1978–79 and 1980–81 Notts Alliance Cup tournaments, falling to Hucknall Colliery Welfare and Worthington Simpsons, respectively. John Wholey became manager in 1982–83, although a lack of goals frustrated his tenure, and he was replaced in 1984–85 by Ralph Brown. Brown stated that "there were no players … and no money" when he took on the role, and Gedling was relegated at the end of the season.

Gedling soon stumbled in Division One of the Notts Alliance, losing nine matches by the first November. In its opening two seasons, the club finished firmly in the lower half of the league. It then spent a considerable spell of 1987–88 in last position before being relegated again. The club placed bottom of Division Two in 1988–89, but could not be demoted from what was the basement competition of the Notts Alliance. The team led the division for periods of 1989–90 before finishing an improved fifth. After 1990–91, they were promoted back to Division One as runners-up. (Note: Gedling Colliery was also known interchangeably as Gedling Colliery Welfare from at least 1953 and Gedling Miners Welfare from at least 1960. The Football Club History Database posits that the former name was the club's official one by 1991 and that it changed to the latter name in 1993. Gedling Miners Welfare has been the only name used since it joined the Central Midlands Football League in 2002.) Despite a strong defence in 1995–96, Gedling struggled in the seasons following promotion and never placed above fifth. As the bottom side after 1999–2000, the club was again relegated to Division Two amid a lack of personnel, funds and resources. However, under manager Vic Hulme, the team won the league's title and Intermediate Cup at the end of the subsequent campaign. Gedling signed several players for 2001–02, but a disappointing season culminated in the resignation of chairman Wayne Osbourne.

==== Into the football pyramid, 2002–present ====
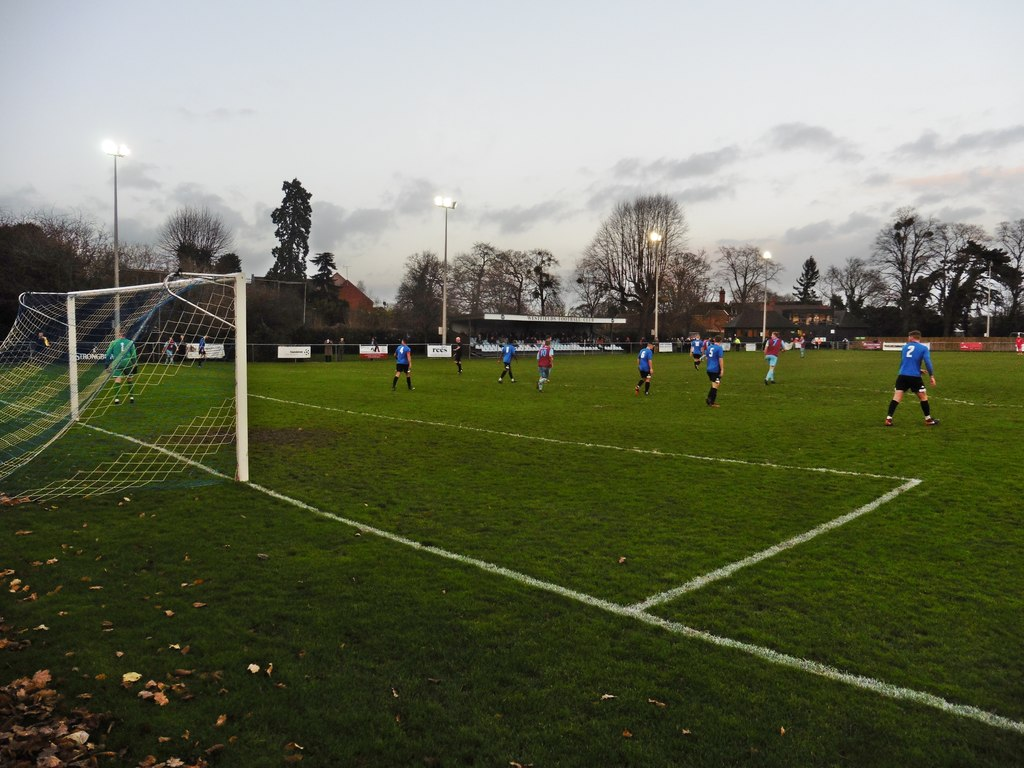
Gedling returned to the FA Cup in 2008–09 with a 7–1 defeat at Westfields (Westfields' Allpay Park ground pictured in 2018).

Hulme became chairman for 2002–03, while Duncan Broad and Mark Allison were appointed as joint-managers. Faced with a dwindling committee and concerns over its future, the club left the Notts Alliance to join the Central Midlands Football League (CML) Premier Division. After finishing fourth in its first campaign, Gedling surpassed its own expectations by being promoted to the CML Supreme Division at the tenth level of the English football league system. (Note: During Gedling's membership of the Central Midlands Football League, its Premier Division was technically separate from the English football league system, although it fed sequentially into its topmost Supreme Division, which sat at level ten. For 2004–05, the CML Supreme Division dropped to level 11 due to the creation of the Conference North at level six.) Thereafter, the team aimed to consolidate its position in the league, and placed progressively higher in the table until 2006–07. Although the team's goalscoring was lacklustre in 2005–06, the following season saw them criticised internally for a perceived lack of effort, and the club finished 16th out of 20. Meanwhile, Gedling's years in the CML coincided with its entrance into the FA Vase. The team debuted in 2005–06, losing 2–1 to Alvechurch in the first qualifying round. They lost by the same margin to Dunkirk in 2007–08 after reaching the first round proper, a club record run.

Gedling was a founder member of the tenth-tier East Midlands Counties Football League (EMCFL) and its sole Premier Division, transferring to it for 2008–09. This season also marked the club's return to the FA Cup, losing 7–1 at Westfields in the extra preliminary round. Broad and Allison left in May 2008 and were replaced by Craig Maddison. Maddison resigned at the end of 2009–10 and was succeeded by Graham Walker and Kuki Morley. Walker departed after 2010–11, leaving Morley in partnership with Lee Boulton. Morley and Boulton oversaw a downturn at Gedling, and they were replaced during 2011–12 by Andy Muldoon. Muldoon rebuilt the squad, a move which steadied the club and spared it relegation. Since 2013–14 failed to deliver sufficient progress, Muldoon made way for Jonathan Simpson. In the 2014–15 FA Vase, Gedling matched its record run in the tournament, falling 2–0 to A.F.C. Mansfield in the first round proper. Simpson resigned following 2015–16 as the club placed 14th out of 19. Walker returned to management with Frank Corrigan for 2016–17. After a weak start, the pair vacated in December for interim player-manager Scott Miles. Gedling finished in the relegation zone and was only reprieved by the collapse of Greenwood Meadows.

Stuart Robinson and Chris Marks took charge for 2017–18, steering Gedling to an improved finish before Robinson left at the end of the season. Marks appointed Andy Clerke as joint-manager for 2018–19, a period hindered by chaotic form, and the team closed in 16th. Marks and Clerke led Gedling into the following campaign before the league was abandoned on 15 March in response to the COVID-19 pandemic. The team resumed in August, although 2020–21 was likewise curtailed after they had fulfilled just eight fixtures. The EMCFL subsequently folded and so the club transferred to the United Counties League (UCL) Division One, also at level ten. Now managed by Clerke alone, Gedling again struggled for consistency in its first season, falling below internal expectations with a mid-table climax. Clerke was joined by Steve Kirkham for 2022–23, but a 19th-place finish out of 21 was followed by the departure of both coaches. Forward Ruben Wiggins-Thomas became player-manager for 2023–24. In his first season, Wiggins-Thomas led Gedling to the first round proper of the FA Vase, again matching the club record ahead of a 2–1 loss to Loughborough University.

=== Season-by-season record since 2002–03 ===
Season	Division	Level	Position	FA Cup	FA Vase	Post-season notes
2002–03	Central Midlands Football League Premier Division	-	4th/17	-	-	Promoted
2003–04	Central Midlands Football League Supreme Division	10	9th/19	-	-	Division dropped by default due to creation of Conference North at level six
2004–05	Central Midlands Football League Supreme Division	11	8th/22	-	-	
2005–06	Central Midlands Football League Supreme Division	11	5th/21	-	1QR	
2006–07	Central Midlands Football League Supreme Division	11	16th/20	-	2QR	
2007–08	Central Midlands Football League Supreme Division	11	6th/20	-	1R	Transferred to East Midlands Counties Football League Premier Division at level ten
2008–09	East Midlands Counties Football League Premier Division	10	8th/18	EPR	1QR	
2009–10	East Midlands Counties Football League Premier Division	10	8th/20	EPR	1QR	
2010–11	East Midlands Counties Football League Premier Division	10	4th/20	PR	2QR	
2011–12	East Midlands Counties Football League Premier Division	10	13th/19	EPR	1QR	
2012–13	East Midlands Counties Football League Premier Division	10	13th/19	-	2QR	
2013–14	East Midlands Counties Football League Premier Division	10	12th/19	-	1QR	
2014–15	East Midlands Counties Football League Premier Division	10	12th/20	-	1R	
2015–16	East Midlands Counties Football League Premier Division	10	14th/19	-	1QR	
2016–17	East Midlands Counties Football League Premier Division	10	20th/22	-	1QR	
2017–18	East Midlands Counties Football League Premier Division	10	10th/21	-	1QR	
2018–19	East Midlands Counties Football League Premier Division	10	16th/20	-	1QR	
2019–20	East Midlands Counties Football League Premier Division	10	N/A	-	2QR	Season abandoned due to COVID-19
2020–21	East Midlands Counties Football League Premier Division	10	N/A	-	2QR	League folded after season abandoned due to COVID-19; transferred to United Counties League Division One at level ten
2021–22	United Counties League Division One	10	13th/23	-	2QR	
2022–23	United Counties League Division One	10	19th/21	-	2QR	
2023–24	United Counties League Division One	10	12th/21	-	1R	
2024–25	United Counties League Division One	10	7th/19	-	1QR	

== Club identity ==
The team's home kit in 1934–35

Gedling implemented yellow and blue as the club's main colours in 1947 and continues to adopt these for its home kits. Prior to this change, the team played in other colour schemes, including red shirts and white shorts in 1934–35. Away kits have been similarly varied. White and blue was used in different combinations from 2005 to 2007, after which an all-white kit was introduced. An all-red ensemble replaced this kit in 2011 and is still worn by the players as of 2025. The team were nicknamed "the Colliers" when the club was known as Gedling Colliery, "the Saints" as Mapperley St. Jude's, and, most recently, "the Miners" as Gedling Miners Welfare.

The club's badge reflects its mining heritage by depicting the wheel of a headstock, structures built for hoisting machines, people and materials to and from underground mine shafts. In the UCL, Gedling has considered matches against Clifton All Whites, Radford and Hucknall Town (formerly Colliery Welfare) to constitute local rivalries. Gedling likewise identified Arnold Town and Gedling Town as rivals in the EMCFL, while more traditional adversaries in previous competitions included Bestwood Colliery and Netherfield Albion.

== Grounds ==
=== First club ===
The club has played home matches since its inaugural season, with its first ground situated at Westdale Lane in Gedling. In 1923, as Chairman of the Digby Colliery Company (parent to the Gedling Colliery Company), Dennis Readett-Bayley approved plans for a brick pavilion featuring dressing rooms for both home and away teams. Costing £350, it opened in September and was praised by colliery management as an "instance of the directors' practical interest in [miners'] welfare". (Note: £350 in 1923 equated approximately to £23,700 in 2022; this figure is calculated from the increase in Retail Price Index (RPI) percentage between the two years.) However, on-field challenges persisted. The Newark Advertiser commented in 1927 that "the ground was against good shooting – the grass being uncut", while, in 1931, the team caused controversy by playing a match there despite the referee deeming it unfit in a spell of bad weather. The following year, two players came to blows at the ground before being sent off. By September 1932, St. Jude's had moved to a pitch at Thorneywood Lane in Mapperley; this venue was leased by the club until its final campaign in 1934–35.

=== Second club ===
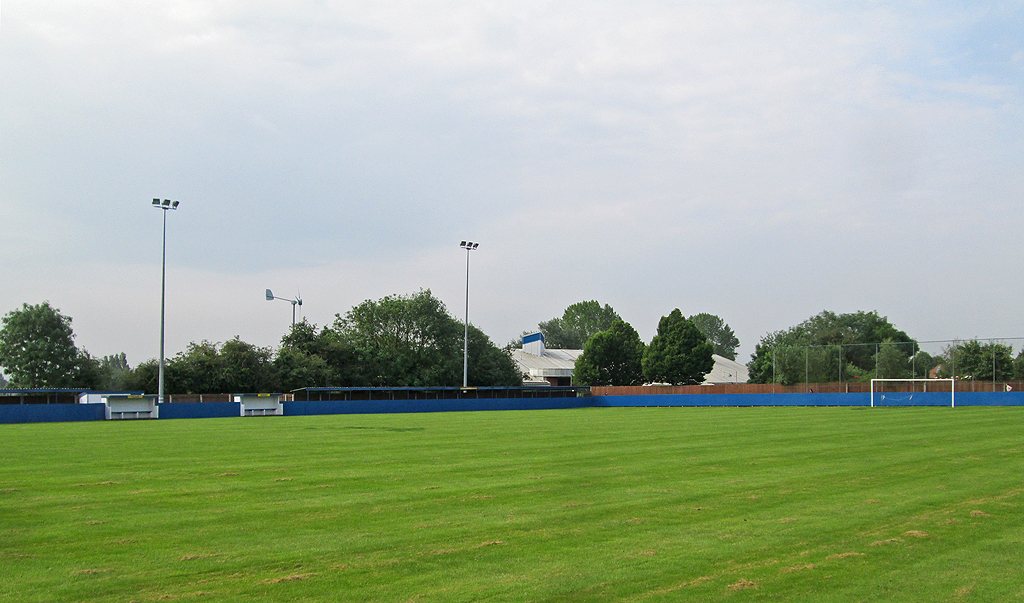
Gedling's ground at Plains Road (pictured in 2014)

Gedling resumed play in 1942 at Plains Road in Mapperley. This ground contained a pavilion featuring a dance floor, canteen, offices and baths. The pitch was resurfaced in 1951, although frost remained an issue during the following year. Before Gedling's 1954 FA Amateur Cup tie against Pegasus, the News Chronicle wrote that Plains Road had "an excellent playing pitch and ample dressing accommodation". The ground had a ticketed capacity of 2,200, with 1,000 of these supporters held by a temporary covered stand built specifically for the match. Police set a crowd limit of 10,500, although the club record figure realised was around 7,000 owing to cold weather. A crowd limit of 10,000 was set for the 1956 Amateur Cup match against Bishop Auckland, and a temporary stand was erected once again. Despite Gedling's groundsmen clearing snow from the pitch, wintry conditions reduced the attendance to around 5,000. More typical gates at Plains Road numbered 300 or less.

Former England forward Norman Creek opined in 1957 that Plains Road had dressing rooms and other facilities that "even some professional clubs would envy". These facilities included floodlights for night-time training. Meanwhile, snow and frozen earth continued to compromise the playing surface, and in 1959 referee Reg Leafe postponed Gedling's Amateur Cup tie against Hallam twice in one week. The ground remained occasionally problematic into the late 1970s, when two Gedling fixtures were moved after the pitch was deemed unsuitable. In 1992, Plains Road came under threat when the Co-operative Wholesale Society intended to build a supermarket on the site. However, Gedling Borough Council dismissed the proposals in 1996, and the ground survived. Plains Road underwent major renovations during the 2000s. On the field, additions included a new pitch surface, dugouts, fences, floodlights and turnstile entrances. Dressing rooms were also added, alongside a clubhouse, bar and hardstanding. The Harold Hulme Stand was later erected to provide covered seating on one side of the ground, contributing to an overall capacity of 2,000.

== Honours ==
Honour	Year(s)
Notts Alliance League; League Cup winners	1919–20, 1949–50, 1952–53, 1956–57, 1957–58, 1959–60, 1961–62
Notts Wartime League; Division One champions	1943–44
Notts Amateur League; Division Two champions	1944–45
Carlton Red Cross Cup; Winners	1944–45
Notts Amateur League; Division One champions	1945–46
Notts Alliance League; Division One champions	1949–50, 1950–51, 1951–52, 1953–54, 1955–56, 1956–57, 1957–58
Arnold Benevolent Cup; Winners	1950–51
Nottinghamshire Senior Cup; Winners	1952–53
Notts Alliance League; Senior Division champions	1958–59, 1959–60, 1960–61
Notts Alliance League; Division Two champions	2000–01
Notts Alliance League; Division Two Intermediate Cup winners	2000–01

== National tournament records ==
Record	Year(s)
FA Amateur Cup; Second round	1953–54, 1955–56, 1956–57
FA Cup; Second qualifying round	1949–50, 1954–55
FA Vase; First round	2007–08, 2014–15, 2023–24
