= 2013–14 East Midlands Counties Football League =

The 2013–14 East Midlands Counties Football League season was the 6th in the history of East Midlands Counties Football League, a football competition in England.

== League ==
East Midlands Counties Football League
- Season: 2013–14
- Champions: Thurnby Nirvana
- Promoted: Thurnby Nirvana
- Matches: 342
- Goals: 1,387 (4.06 per match)

The league featured 16 clubs from the previous season, along with three new clubs:

- Arnold Town, demoted from the Northern Counties East League
- Stapenhill, promoted from the Leicestershire Senior League
- Sutton Town, promoted from the Central Midlands Football League

Also, Eliistown merged with Ibstock United to form Ellistown & Ibstock United.

=== League table ===
Pos	Team	Pld	W	D	L	GF	GA	GD	Pts	Promotion or relegation
1	Thurnby Nirvana	36	25	8	3	107	50	+57	83	Promoted to the United Counties League
2	Stapenhill	36	22	8	6	101	53	+48	74	
3	Ellistown & Ibstock United	36	22	6	8	86	54	+32	72	
4	Blaby & Whetstone Athletic	36	22	3	11	75	34	+41	69	
5	Borrowash Victoria	36	22	5	9	87	48	+39	68 (Note: Borrowash Victoria and St Andrews were deducted 3 points each for fielding an ineligible player.)	
6	Arnold Town	36	21	4	11	87	55	+32	67	
7	St Andrews	36	21	6	9	93	56	+37	66	
8	Sutton Town	36	18	7	11	92	61	+31	61	Resigned from the league
9	Holwell Sports	36	18	7	11	86	68	+18	61	
10	Graham Street Prims	36	18	4	14	84	62	+22	58	
11	Bardon Hill	36	14	10	12	69	67	+2	52	
12	Gedling Miners Welfare	36	11	9	16	60	74	−14	42	
13	Holbrook Sports	36	10	3	23	48	79	−31	33	
14	Radcliffe Olympic	36	8	8	20	84	102	−18	32	
15	Radford	36	9	5	22	54	89	−35	32	
16	Greenwood Meadows	36	7	9	20	46	88	−42	30	
17	Anstey Nomads	36	8	3	25	50	124	−74	27	
18	Aylestone Park	36	5	6	25	38	101	−63	21	
19	Barrow Town	36	3	5	28	40	122	−82	14	Reprieved from relegation

Source: fchd
Rules for classification: 1) points; 2) goal difference; 3) number of goals scored.

=== Results ===
Home \ Away	ANN	ARN	AYP	BAH	BAT	B&WA	BOV	ELL	GMW	GSP	GWM	HBS	HWS	RAD	RAF	STA	STP	SUT	THU
Anstey Nomads		1–2	3–1	1–0	2–1	0–1	0–8	0–5	2–2	0–2	0–1	0–3	2–1	2–6	1–3	2–5	1–10	1–7	3–4
Arnold Town	3–1		5–1	2–2	8–2	0–1	1–2	1–3	3–0	3–0	2–0	3–0	2–3	4–1	4–0	1–2	0–0	1–0	2–6
Aylestone Park	4–1	2–5		5–0	0–0	0–5	0–2	0–1	0–2	1–0	5–1	0–1	1–5	3–3	1–1	1–3	2–2	0–5	0–3
Bardon Hill	4–2	2–0	4–2		5–1	2–1	4–4	4–1	2–2	1–3	2–2	3–1	2–2	3–0	2–3	1–1	1–2	0–5	1–2
Barrow Town	10–3	2–4	2–0	1–1		0–2	0–2	3–4	0–8	1–4	2–1	0–4	1–2	1–4	1–1	2–2	1–2	0–2	1–5
Blaby & Whetstone Athletic	2–0	1–3	5–2	1–0	6–0		0–3	0–1	0–1	0–1	5–1	1–0	0–3	3–2	9–0	1–2	1–2	2–0	1–1
Borrowash Victoria	1–2	2–2	4–0	3–0	4–0	1–0		0–1	1–0	3–0	2–0	2–1	2–2	1–1	2–1	1–1	2–3	6–2	2–1
Ellistown	5–2	2–1	5–1	1–1	3–0	0–1	0–5		2–2	1–1	7–2	2–1	3–1	5–3	4–0	3–1	1–2	0–2	1–1
Gedling Miners Welfare	1–1	1–2	3–0	3–4	1–0	0–5	2–4	2–2		2–1	2–1	2–0	1–2	0–2	4–0	0–4	0–6	0–2	1–1
Graham Street Prims	4–1	1–3	10–0	0–1	2–0	0–1	2–0	1–5	5–1		1–2	2–0	5–2	3–3	3–3	4–2	2–3	5–1	0–1
Greenwood Meadows	0–2	3–2	2–1	2–4	2–1	0–1	2–1	1–4	2–2	1–2		1–2	1–3	5–2	0–5	0–5	2–2	0–0	2–2
Holbrook Sports	2–2	1–4	4–0	0–2	3–1	1–4	3–2	0–2	3–0	1–4	2–2		0–2	4–2	0–3	2–3	1–0	1–2	0–2
Holwell Sports	3–4	0–2	3–0	1–1	8–0	2–4	3–2	1–3	4–4	4–5	3–0	2–1		3–2	2–1	3–4	1–1	1–4	3–3
Radcliffe Olympic	5–1	2–3	2–2	2–3	4–1	2–2	1–2	4–1	0–2	2–2	0–0	3–3	0–2		4–1	1–2	4–6	1–3	3–5
Radford	1–2	1–1	1–0	1–3	3–0	0–3	0–4	2–3	0–4	2–0	1–1	5–1	1–3	2–3		1–2	1–4	0–2	1–3
St Andrews	4–2	4–1	2–2	2–2	9–0	0–1	0–2	1–2	4–0	0–2	4–1	3–0	1–2	4–2	2–1		5–4	2–1	0–1
Stapenhill	6–1	1–2	3–0	3–0	2–2	3–0	2–3	1–1	1–0	4–1	3–1	3–0	1–2	6–4	3–2	3–2		3–3	0–2
Sutton Town	3–2	1–2	0–1	3–2	6–1	0–4	7–1	4–1	2–2	3–4	3–1	4–0	2–2	5–3	1–2	3–3	2–2		1–1
Thurnby Nirvana	4–0	4–3	3–0	2–0	3–2	1–1	4–1	2–1	6–3	4–2	3–3	6–2	2–0	7–1	7–4	1–2	0–2	4–1	

Source: mitoo
Legend: Blue = home team win; Yellow = draw; Red = away team win.
