= 2011–12 East Midlands Counties Football League =

The 2011–12 East Midlands Counties Football League season was the 4th in the history of East Midlands Counties Football League, a football competition in England.

== League ==
East Midlands Counties Football League
- Season: 2011–12
- Champions: Heanor Town
- Promoted: Heanor Town
- Matches: 342
- Goals: 1,267 (3.7 per match)

The league featured 17 clubs from the previous season, along with two new clubs:

- Blaby & Whetstone Athletic, promoted from the Leicestershire Senior League
- Oadby Town, relegated from the Midland Football Alliance

=== League table ===
Pos	Team	Pld	W	D	L	GF	GA	GD	Pts	Promotion or relegation
1	Heanor Town	36	28	4	4	121	48	+73	88	Promoted to the Northern Counties East League
2	Borrowash Victoria	36	26	3	7	81	30	+51	81	
3	Oadby Town	36	24	6	6	95	33	+62	78	Transferred to the United Counties League
4	St Andrews	36	21	5	10	78	60	+18	68	
5	Barrow Town	36	20	5	11	89	56	+33	65	
6	Holbrook Sports	36	18	9	9	68	56	+12	63	
7	Thurnby Nirvana	36	18	5	13	82	64	+18	59	
8	Blackwell Miners Welfare	36	17	4	15	73	61	+12	55	Club folded
9	Anstey Nomads	36	14	9	13	66	60	+6	51	
10	Bardon Hill	36	15	6	15	68	71	−3	51	
11	Holwell Sports	36	14	4	18	67	74	−7	46	
12	Blaby & Whetstone Athletic	36	12	10	14	48	60	−12	46	
13	Gedling Miners Welfare	36	12	2	22	55	94	−39	38	
14	Graham Street Prims	36	10	6	20	49	85	−36	36	
15	Greenwood Meadows	36	10	5	21	38	73	−35	35	
16	Radcliffe Olympic	36	10	4	22	58	84	−26	34	
17	Radford	36	9	4	23	41	80	−39	31	
18	Ibstock United	36	7	6	23	33	77	−44	26 (Note: Ibstock United were deducted 1 point.)	
19	Ellistown	36	5	7	24	57	101	−44	18 (Note: Ellistown were deducted 4 points.)	

Source: fchd
Rules for classification: 1) points; 2) goal difference; 3) number of goals scored.
