= Widdowson =

Widdowson is a surname. Notable people with the surname include:

- Albert Widdowson (1864–1938), English cricketer
- Alf Widdowson (1900–1970), English footballer
- Bob Widdowson (born 1941), English footballer
- Daniel Widdowson, Australian actor, artistic director and writer
- Elsie Widdowson (1906–2000), British food scientist
- Frances Widdowson, Canadian political scientist
- Grace Widdowson (1892 –1989), New Zealand nurse and hospital matron
- Henry Widdowson (born 1935), British linguist
- J. D. A. Widdowson (born 1935), British linguist and folklorist
- Joe Widdowson (born 1989), English footballer
- Martin Widdowson (born 1946), Royal Air Force officer
- Paul Widdowson (born 1974), English cricketer
- Ralph David Widdowson (1903–1969), Associate Professor at Pennsylvania State University
- Sam Weller Widdowson (1851–1927), English footballer and cricketer
- Tom Widdowson (1862–1944), English footballer
