= Jack Starsmore =

Jack Starsmore may refer to:

- Jack Starsmore (footballer), an English footballer active in the early 1900s
- Jack Starsmore, a fictional character in Marvel Comics and member of Clan Akkaba
