= Jimmy Loughlin =

English footballer

Personal information
- Full name: James Loughlin
- Date of birth: 9 October 1905
- Place of birth: Darlington, England
- Height: 5 ft 10 in (1.78 m)
- Position: Centre forward

Senior career*
Years	Team	Apps	(Gls)
- Darlington Railway Athletic
1924–1927	Newcastle United	12	(5)
1927–1929	West Ham United	10	(4)
1929–1931	Coventry City	61	(32)
- Dolphin
1931	Bray Unknowns		
1931–1932	Worcester City		(34)
- Northwich Victoria
1933–1934	Darlington	10	(5)
- * Club domestic league appearances and goals

James Loughlin (9 October 1905 – after 1933) was an English footballer who scored 46 goals from 93 appearances in the Football League playing for Newcastle United, West Ham United, Coventry City and Darlington. Primarily a centre forward, he also played in Ireland for Dolphin and Bray Unknowns and in English non-league football for Darlington Railway Athletic, Worcester City and Northwich Victoria.

== Early career ==
Loughlin was born in Darlington, County Durham, where he worked on the railway and played football for Darlington Railway Athletic. After a trial with Newcastle United, in which he scored for the club's North-Eastern League team, he signed as a professional in November 1924. He made his first-team debut on 27 December in a goalless draw away to Huddersfield Town in the First Division, on a pitch described by the Yorkshire Post as practically under water. His next appearance was in September 1925: he scored a hat-trick as Newcastle beat Leicester City 3–2. He kept his place for a few weeks, and scored once more, before returning to the reserves until near the end of the season. In 1926–27, he stood in when Hughie Gallacher was away on international duty in October, but appeared only once for the first team thereafter, and finished the season as reserve-team top scorer "with about 40 goals to his name".

He was transfer-listed by Newcastle, and together with two teammates, George Robson and Harry Smith, signed for fellow First Division club West Ham United in May 1927. Loughlin made his West Ham debut on 3 September, replacing the injured Vic Watson for the league match against Huddersfield Town. He scored the opening goal within five minutes of the start, and West Ham went on to win 4–2. The following week, at home to Portsmouth, he scored twice as West Ham came back from 2–0 down with 25 minutes remaining to again win 4–2. In the next match, he played alongside Watson, who again suffered an injury, and Loughlin played in the next five matches, without scoring, before losing his place. He played twice more, at the end of the season, scoring in a 3–3 draw with Birmingham, and was retained for 1928–29. He continued to score freely for the London Combination team, but was unable to dislodge either Vivian Gibbins or Victor Watson – both England internationals – from the senior team.

== Coventry City ==
At the beginning of January 1929, he and teammate Danny Shone were sold to Coventry City of the Third Division South for what were described as substantial fees. According to the Coventry Evening Telegraph, it was Loughlin's "desire to get a chance in League football which was the deciding factor in inducing him to come to Coventry." Loughlin made his debut in a 3–0 win against Brighton & Hove Albion, and the following week, at home to Fulham, converted a cross from Ernie Toseland to open the scoring after half an hour, but Coventry were unable to retain their lead and lost 2–1. He scored twice in the next match, away to Exeter City. The first was a tap-in after Toseland's shot rebounded to him off the goalpost, the second, to clinch a 3–1 win, came from a solo run in which he dribbled past centre-half, both backs and the goalkeeper to walk the ball into the net. He missed only one match in what remained of the season, with a thigh injury in February. His form varied, as did that of the team, and he finished the campaign with eight goals from 19 league appearances – only two players scored more.

Ahead of the 1929–30 season, the Coventry Telegraph speculated that, with the return to full fitness of Billy Kirton and Alf Widdowson, Loughlin would be competing with John Starsmore for the centre-forward position. Loughlin began the season in possession, but an injury in the opening match caused him to miss the next five fixtures. Returning at inside left with Starsmore in the centre, Loughlin scored Coventry's second goal in a 3–1 win away to Watford, and contributed five goals in the next five matches, but changes made to try and "stop the rot" of too many defeats meant he spent the next few weeks out of the team. Brought back into the team at the last minute for the home match against Gillingham on 23 November, he scored twice in a 5–0 win, and this time kept his place apart from two brief absences through injury. From 35 appearances in league and FA Cup, he scored 30 goals, which made him Coventry's top scorer by a distance; his 24 goals from 31 league matches helped his club finish sixth in the division.

Despite his goalscoring, Loughlin was not universally popular at Coventry. Writing in the Evening Telegraph, the pseudonymous "Nemo" suggested that inconsistency may have been the reason:

... although there are many who have never taken kindly to Loughlin since he came to the City, I don't think it can be said for one moment that he has not given the club good service. Loughlin is a player with extremes of temperament. Either he can do hardly anything right, or he can do nothing wrong, We have seen him in the latter mood when he has scored brilliant goals by dint of really clever play; at other times we have seen him miss chances a centre-forward often only dreams about.

He began the 1930–31 season in the senior team, but after two matches he showed little sign of regaining his previous season's form, and lost his place to new signing Jack Phillips. After scoring freely in the reserves, he came back into the first team at inside right for the visit to Brentford on 18 October, "played a nice constructive game", and scored in a 2–1 win. He kept his place for three of the next four matches, but thereafter made only five appearances without scoring in the rest of the season. He was transfer listed at a fee of £700; although that figure was reduced on appeal, he was unable to find another Football League club.

== Later career ==
In 1931, Loughlin spent time in Ireland, where he joined up with Dolphin and played in the Free State League for Bray Unknowns. By 10 October, he was back in England with Worcester City, where he earned himself a reputation as a "crack marksman", scoring 34 goals as his team finished as runners-up in the Birmingham League. He then played for Cheshire County League side Northwich Victoria before, in May 1933, Coventry granted him a free transfer, facilitating his return to the Football League with Darlington of the Third Division North. The Sunderland Echo had high hopes:

It will be interesting to see how Jimmy Loughlin fares at Feethams during the coming season. When he was a Newcastle United player this former Darlington R.A. centre forward was never properly appreciated, but the St. James's Park officials have signed many a worse forward since Jimmy shook the Gallowgate dust from off his shooting boots, and although Loughlin has grown no younger since his Magpie days I fancy that Darlington will get a deal of good out of the lad.

He started the season in the first team, and scored four goals in the first few weeks, but the arrival of centre-forward Jerry Best restricted Loughlin to the role of reserve. He finished the season with five goals from ten league appearances, and was given a free transfer.
