= Stapenhill F.C. =

Association football club in England

Coordinates: 52°46′48.74″N 1°37′30.74″W

Stapenhill
- Full name: Stapenhill Football Club
- Nickname: The Swans
- Founded: 1947 (reformed 2009)
- Ground: Edge Hill, Stapenhill
- Capacity: 2,000
- Chairman: Jim Connell
- Manager: Louis Briscoe
- League: Midland League Division One
- 2025–26: Midland League Division One, 16th of 21
Home colours	Away colours

Stapenhill Football Club is a football club based in the Stapenhill area of Burton-on-Trent, Staffordshire, England. They are currently members of the Midland League Division One and play at Edge Hill.

== History ==
They were formed in 1947 and ten years after formation they joined the Leicestershire Senior League Division Two and found immediate success, gaining promotion in their debut season and winning the Division One championship in the following two seasons. They remained in that division, apart from a single season (1971–72) in Division Two, winning the top flight, now renamed the Premier Division, twice more – 1986–87 and 1988–89. They then joined the Midland Combination Premier Division, staying there for five seasons until they became a founding member of the Midland Alliance where they remained until resigning from the league in January 2002. Later that year they joined the Leicestershire Senior League and were promoted as runners-up into the Premier Division. In the 2007–08 season, they were members of the Midland Football Alliance, but after a fire ravaged their home stadium, the club was forced to close down. The club reformed in 2009 and rejoined the Leicestershire Senior League.

== Honours ==
- East Midlands Counties Football League
  - Runners-up 2013–14
- Leicestershire Senior League
  - Champions 1958–59, 1959–60, 1986–87, 1988–89, 2006–07
- Bass Charity Vase
  - Champions 1955, 1956, 1959 (shared), 1965, 1966
  - Runners-up 1960, 1961, 1967, 1970, 1989

== Records ==
- FA Cup best performance: second qualifying round – 1996–97, 1998–99
- FA Vase best performance: second round replay – 1992–93, 1996–97

== Former players ==
1. Players that have played/managed in the Football League or any foreign equivalent to this level (i.e. fully professional league).
2. Players with full international caps.
3. Players that hold a club record or have captained the club.

- (England) Ken Horne
- (England) Nigel Sims
