= 2019–20 East Midlands Counties Football League =

The 2019–20 East Midlands Counties Football League season was the 12th of the East Midlands Counties Football League, a football competition in England at level 10 of the English football league system.

The allocations for Steps 1 to 6 for season 2019–20 were announced by the FA on 19 May. These were subject to appeal, and the East Midlands Counties' constitution was subject to ratification at the league's AGM on 25 June.

As a result of the COVID-19 pandemic, this season's competition was formally abandoned on 26 March 2020, with all results from the season being expunged, and no promotion or relegation taking place to or from the competition. On 30 March 2020, sixty-six non-league clubs sent an open letter to the Football Association requesting that they reconsider their decision.

== Premier Division ==
East Midlands Counties Football League
- Season: 2019–20
- Matches: 255
- Goals: 957 (3.75 per match)
- Top goalscorer: Jamie Sleigh 29 Heanor Town
- Biggest home win: Heanor Town 6-0 Belper United Eastwood 6-0 Clipstone; Belper United 7-1 Gedling MW
- Biggest away win: Shirebrook Town 2-10 Hucknall Town
- Highest scoring: Shirebrook Town 2-10 Hucknall Town
- Highest attendance: Eastwood v Heanor Town 357
- Lowest attendance: Clifton All Whites v Belper United 10

The league featured 16 clubs from the previous season, along with three new clubs:

- Dunkirk, relegated from the Midland League Premier Division
- Hucknall Town, promoted from the Central Midlands League
- Shirebrook Town, transferred from Northern Counties East League Division One

Also, FC Bolsover were transferred from Northern Counties East League Division One but resigned before the start of the season.

=== League table ===
| Pos | Team | Pld | W | D | L | GF | GA | GD | Pts |
|---|---|---|---|---|---|---|---|---|---|
| 1 | Sherwood Colliery | 27 | 20 | 4 | 3 | 72 | 34 | +38 | 64 |
| 2 | Heanor Town | 26 | 19 | 5 | 2 | 84 | 29 | +55 | 62 |
| 3 | Eastwood | 29 | 19 | 4 | 6 | 77 | 38 | +39 | 61 |
| 4 | Dunkirk | 28 | 18 | 7 | 3 | 67 | 33 | +34 | 61 |
| 5 | Hucknall Town | 27 | 14 | 9 | 4 | 75 | 36 | +39 | 51 |
| 6 | West Bridgford | 26 | 11 | 7 | 8 | 45 | 43 | +2 | 40 |
| 7 | Gedling Miners Welfare | 27 | 12 | 3 | 12 | 59 | 56 | +3 | 39 |
| 8 | Graham Street Prims | 26 | 11 | 6 | 9 | 46 | 46 | 0 | 39 |
| 9 | Radford | 27 | 12 | 3 | 12 | 45 | 52 | −7 | 39 |
| 10 | Barrow Town | 26 | 10 | 3 | 13 | 58 | 53 | +5 | 33 |
| 11 | Ingles | 26 | 10 | 3 | 13 | 36 | 49 | −13 | 33 |
| 12 | Belper United | 27 | 9 | 4 | 14 | 40 | 58 | −18 | 31 |
| 13 | Clifton All Whites | 25 | 8 | 6 | 11 | 43 | 42 | +1 | 30 |
| 14 | Rainworth Miners Welfare | 28 | 7 | 8 | 13 | 41 | 52 | −11 | 29 |
| 15 | Clipstone | 29 | 8 | 4 | 17 | 39 | 65 | −26 | 28 |
| 16 | Kimberley Miners Welfare | 27 | 5 | 12 | 10 | 43 | 53 | −10 | 27 |
| 17 | Teversal | 25 | 5 | 3 | 17 | 32 | 73 | −41 | 18 |
| 18 | Shirebrook Town | 28 | 5 | 3 | 20 | 30 | 80 | −50 | 18 |
| 19 | Borrowash Victoria | 26 | 3 | 4 | 19 | 25 | 65 | −40 | 10 (Note: Borrowash Victoria were deducted three points for failure to fulfil fixture 22 October 2019.) |

Updated to match(es) played on 14 March 2020. Source: FA Full-time
Rules for classification: 1) Points; 2) Goal difference; 3) Number of goals scored; 4) Number of matches won; 5) Head-to-head results

=== Stadia and locations ===
Location of the clubs in the 2019–20 East Midlands Counties League on a map of the East Midlands

| Club | Stadium |
|---|---|
| Barrow Town | Barrow Road |
| Belper United | Christchurch Meadow (Note: home of Belper Town (groundshare)) |
| Borrowash Victoria | Borrowash Road (Note: part of the same complex as Graham Street Prims) |
| Clifton All Whites | Green Lane |
| Clipstone | Lido Ground |
| Dunkirk | Lenton Lane |
| Eastwood Community | Coronation Park |
| Gedling Miners Welfare | Plains Road |
| Graham Street Prims | Borrowash Road (Note: part of the same complex as Borrowash Victoria) |
| Heanor Town | Town Ground |
| Hucknall Town | Watnall Road |
| Ingles | The Dovecote Stadium (Note: home of Shepshed Albion (groundshare)) |
| Kimberley Miners Welfare | Stag Ground |
| Radford | Selhurst Street |
| Rainworth Miners Welfare | Kirklington Road |
| Sherwood Colliery | Debdale Park |
| Shirebrook Town | Langwith Road |
| Teversal | Carnarvon Street |
| West Bridgford | Regatta Way |
