= Harry Smith (footballer, born 1904) =

English footballer

Personal information
- Full name: Harold Smith
- Date of birth: 10 March 1904
- Place of birth: North Shields, England
- Position: Inside left

Senior career*
Years	Team	Apps	(Gls)
- Cullercoats
1925–1927	Newcastle United	0	(0)
1927–1928	West Ham United	1	(0)
1928–19??	Blyth Spartans		
- West Stanley
- * Club domestic league appearances and goals

Harold Smith (10 March 1904 – after 1928) was an English footballer who played as an inside left in the Football League for West Ham United.

Smith was born in North Shields in 1904. He played local football for Cullercoats before signing for Newcastle United for the 1925–26 season. He remained there for two seasons without playing first-team football, featuring only for the reserve team. When Jimmy Loughlin was sold to First Division club West Ham United in May 1927, Smith and another teammate, George Robson, also made the move. He played only once for the first team, standing in for Vivian Gibbins at inside left for the home match against Manchester United on 29 October; West Ham lost 2–1. He then returned to the north-east in August 1928 to join Blyth Spartans and later played for West Stanley.
