= 1954–55 FA Cup qualifying rounds =

Tournament details
- Country: England; Wales

The FA Cup 1954–55 is the 74th season of the world's oldest football knockout competition; The Football Association Challenge Cup, or FA Cup for short. The large number of clubs entering the tournament from lower down the English football league system meant that the competition started with a number of preliminary and qualifying rounds. The 30 victorious teams from the fourth round qualifying progressed to the first round proper.

== Preliminary round ==
=== Ties ===
Tie	Home team	Score	Away team
1	Arundel	4–0	Wigmore Athletic
2	Ashington	6–1	Newburn
3	Aveley	0–0	Ilford
4	Aylesbury United	0–1	Wycombe Wanderers
5	Bacup Borough	1–0	Rossendale United
6	Barking	3–2	Woodford Town
7	Barnet	11–0	Royston Town
8	Bedworth Town	2–3	Rugby Town
9	Berkhamsted Town	0–3	Hendon
10	Bexhill Town	2–5	Haywards Heath
11	Bexleyheath & Welling	3–3	Tooting & Mitcham United
12	Bicester Town	5–2	Abingdon Town
13	Bodmin Town	2–0	Wadebridge Town
14	Bognor Regis Town	3–2	Redhill
15	Brentwood & Warley	0–1	Rainham Town
16	Brierley Hill Alliance	0–3	Stourbridge
17	Briggs Sports	1–4	Leytonstone
18	Bromsgrove Rovers	4–3	Darlaston
19	Burton Albion	1–0	Tamworth
20	Calne & Harris United	1–1	Bulford United
21	Cambridge City	2–1	Exning United
22	Canterbury City	3–0	Sutton United
23	Chatteris Town	1–3	March Town United
24	Chelmsford City	2–0	Clacton Town
25	Chorley	2–1	Ashton United
26	Clevedon	0–4	Bridgwater Town
27	Congleton Town	2–5	Northwich Victoria
28	Dagenham	3–1	Tilbury
29	Deal Town	0–2	Ashford Town (Kent)
30	Dorking	1–3	Epsom
31	Dover	2–1	Woking
32	Edgware Town	0–2	Hayes
33	Enfield	3–1	Bishop's Stortford
34	Erith & Belvedere	0–4	Margate
35	Eton Manor	0–1	St Albans City
36	Finchley	3–3	Kingstonian
37	Frome Town	4–2	Chippenham Town
38	Gravesend & Northfleet	5–1	Folkestone
39	Halesowen Town	1–4	Kidderminster Harriers
40	Heanor Town	2–5	Whitwick Colliery
41	Heaton Stannington	3–3	Lynemouth Welfare
42	Hemel Hempstead	2–2	Wingate
43	Histon	4–2	Warboys Town
44	Holbeach United	4–1	St Neots & District
45	Horwich R M I	1–0	Skelmersdale United
46	Hounslow Town	2–2	Uxbridge
47	Huntley & Palmers	0–3	Banbury Spencer
48	Hyde United	3–1	Winsford United
49	Leyton	2–0	Grays Athletic
50	Littlehampton Town	3–1	Southwick
51	Llandudno	6–2	New Brighton
52	Lockheed Leamington	7–1	Bourneville Athletic
53	Lostock Gralam	5–0	Linotype & Machinery
54	Lovells Athletic	3–2	Ebbw Vale
55	Lye Town	3–2	Cradley Heath
56	Maidenhead United	2–2	Marlow
57	Maidstone United	1–3	Bromley
58	Marine	4–0	Earlestown
59	Metropolitan Police	1–1	Harrow Town
60	Minehead	3–3	Dartmouth United
61	Nelson	3–0	Lytham
62	Newhaven	2–2	Eastbourne
63	Newquay	5–1	Bideford
64	Oxford City	4–3	Witney Town
65	Pwllheli & District	7–0	Prescot Cables
66	Ramsgate Athletic	1–1	Sittingbourne
67	Redditch	0–1	Oswestry Town
68	Romford	3–1	Harwich & Parkeston
69	Shankhouse	5–1	Alnwick Town
70	Shefford Town	1–0	Letchworth Town
71	Shoreham	1–6	Horsham
72	Slough Town	6–2	Windsor & Eton
73	Somersham Town	3–0	Newmarket Town
74	South Liverpool	1–3	Bangor City
75	South Shields	1–4	North Shields
76	St Austell	3–1	Penzance
77	St Blazey	1–1	Ilfracombe Town
78	Stafford Rangers	3–1	Dudley Town
79	Stevenage Town	5–2	Welwyn Garden City
80	Street	3–2	Weston Super Mare
81	Sutton Town (Birmingham)	0–3	Bloxwich Strollers
82	Taunton	3–3	Barnstaple Town
83	Tavistock	5–2	Tiverton Town
84	Thetford Town	2–0	Ely City
85	Tonbridge	6–0	Sheppey United
86	Tufnell Park Edmonton	0–4	Clapton
87	Tunbridge Wells United	5–0	East Grinstead
88	Vickers Weybridge	0–6	Dartford
89	Walton & Hersham	1–1	Chatham Town
90	Ware	2–3	Hitchin Town
91	Wealdstone	2–4	Wimbledon
92	Welton Rovers	3–7	Swindon Victoria
93	Westbury United	2–0	Warminster Town
94	Wisbech Town	1–1	King's Lynn
95	Worcester City	2–3	Hednesford Town
96	Yiewsley	1–0	Southall

=== Replays ===
Tie	Home team	Score	Away team
3	Ilford	3–0	Aveley
11	Tooting & Mitcham United	4–1	Bexleyheath & Welling
20	Bulford United	6–3	Calne & Harris United
36	Kingstonian	3–1	Finchley
41	Lynemouth Welfare	2–3	Heaton Stannington
42	Wingate	1–3	Hemel Hempstead
46	Uxbridge	1–7	Hounslow Town
56	Marlow	0–2	Maidenhead United
59	Harrow Town	1–5	Metropolitan Police
60	Dartmouth United	3–5	Minehead
62	Eastbourne	3–0	Newhaven
66	Sittingbourne	2–1	Ramsgate Athletic
77	Ilfracombe Town	5–2	St Blazey
82	Barnstaple Town	6–0	Taunton
89	Chatham Town	0–4	Walton & Hersham
94	King's Lynn	8–1	Wisbech Town

== 1st qualifying round ==
=== Ties ===
Tie	Home team	Score	Away team
1	Alford United	4–2	Ashby Institute
2	Altrincham	3–2	Northwich Victoria
3	Ashford Town (Kent)	1–1	Snowdown Colliery Welfare
4	Ashington	6–1	Heaton Stannington
5	Bacup Borough	1–2	Chorley
6	Barking	1–1	Rainham Town
7	Barnet	2–0	Hitchin Town
8	Barry Town	1–1	Cheltenham Town
9	Basford United	1–7	Gresley Rovers
10	Basingstoke Town	3–1	Andover
11	Beccles	2–0	Wymondham Town
12	Beighton Miners Welfare	6–0	Brunswick Institute
13	Billingham Synthonia	2–2	Bridlington Central United
14	Bilston	4–2	Lye Town
15	Birch Coppice Colliery	0–3	Atherstone Town
16	Blackhall Colliery Welfare	2–0	Murton Colliery Welfare
17	Bodmin Town	3–3	Minehead
18	Boldon Colliery Welfare	2–0	Silksworth Colliery Welfare
19	Boots Athletic	1–6	Ilkeston Town
20	Bourne Town	3–2	Symingtons Recreation
21	Brigg Town	0–2	Boston United
22	Brodsworth Main Colliery	0–4	Norton Woodseats
23	Brush Sports	2–0	Players Athletic
24	Burscough	4–0	Penrith
25	Burton Albion	6–1	Bloxwich Strollers
26	Canterbury City	2–2	Dulwich Hamlet
27	Chesham United	1–0	Banbury Spencer
28	Cinderford Town	0–3	Gloucester City
29	Clandown	2–0	Street
30	Clapton	1–1	St Albans City
31	Cockfield	1–1	Ferryhill Athletic
32	Cowes	6–0	Chichester City
33	Dartford	1–2	Dover
34	Darwen	1–0	Horwich R M I
35	Dawdon Colliery Welfare	2–1	Consett
36	Devizes Town	2–5	Trowbridge Town
37	Diss Town	1–3	Stowmarket
38	Dorchester Town	2–1	Poole Town
39	Droylsden	1–2	Mossley
40	Dunstable Town	2–3	Biggleswade & District
41	Durham City	4–3	Ushaw Moor
42	Easington Colliery Welfare	7–2	Birtley
43	Eastbourne	5–3	Littlehampton Town
44	Evenwood Town	4–0	Stockton
45	Flint Town United	5–2	St Helens Town
46	Gorleston	4–0	Sheringham
47	Gosforth & Coxlodge	1–5	Cramlington Welfare
48	Gothic	7–2	Cromer
49	Grantham	5–2	Barton Town
50	Gravesend & Northfleet	1–2	Tonbridge
51	Great Harwood	2–3	Netherfield
52	Hallam	1–3	Sheffield
53	Haverhill Rovers	4–6	Bury Town
54	Hayes	1–1	Wimbledon
55	Hemel Hempstead	0–0	Metropolitan Police
56	Hendon	2–1	Yiewsley
57	Hinckley Athletic	7–1	Long Eaton Town
58	Histon	1–2	Thetford Town
59	Horsham	2–0	Arundel
60	Hyde United	3–0	Buxton
61	Ilford	3–3	Dagenham
62	Ilfracombe Town	2–0	Newquay
63	Kidderminster Harriers	2–3	Hednesford Town
64	King's Lynn	9–0	Huntingdon United
65	Kingstonian	3–4	Hounslow Town
66	Lancaster City	8–1	Milnthorpe Corinthians
67	Leiston	2–3	Sudbury Town
68	Leyton	4–2	Romford
69	Leytonstone	0–0	Chelmsford City
70	Linby Colliery	5–0	Bestwood Colliery
71	Llanelli	1–2	Merthyr Tydfil
72	Lockheed Leamington	4–5	Moor Green
73	Lostock Gralam	2–5	Macclesfield
74	Lovells Athletic	7–1	Stonehouse
75	Lowestoft Town	3–0	Whitton United
76	Maidenhead United	3–2	Bicester Town
77	March Town United	1–0	Cambridge City
78	Margate	4–2	Bromley
79	Marine	1–0	Ellesmere Port Town
80	Matlock Town	1–1	Gedling Colliery
81	Morecambe	2–2	Fleetwood
82	Nantwich	1–2	Stalybridge Celtic
83	Nelson	8–2	Leyland Motors
84	North Shields	5–1	Shankhouse
85	North Skelton Athletic	9–1	Bridlington Trinity
86	North Walsham Athletic	3–2	Bungay Town
87	Oswestry Town	1–2	Bromsgrove Rovers
88	Parliament Street Methodists	2–5	Creswell Colliery
89	Peasedown Miners Welfare	3–1	Chippenham United
90	Potton United	1–0	Vauxhall Motors
91	Pwllheli & District	2–1	Bangor City
92	Radstock Town	4–1	Hanham Athletic
93	Raleigh Athletic	3–2	Moira United
94	Ransome & Marles	0–3	Sutton Town
95	Rawmarsh Welfare	2–1	Bentley Colliery
96	Retford Town	1–4	Denaby United
97	Rugby Town	5–1	Boldmere St Michaels
98	Runcorn	6–0	Llandudno
99	Rushden Town	3–1	Desborough Town
100	Salisbury	2–3	Frome Town
101	Scarborough	3–0	Head Wrightsons
102	Seaham Colliery Welfare	1–2	Annfield Plain
103	Shefford Town	2–5	Hoddesdon Town
104	Shildon	1–2	Willington
105	Shirebrook Miners Welfare	4–0	Cinderhill Colliery
106	Shotton Colliery Welfare	5–1	Trimdon Grange Colliery
107	Sittingbourne	2–1	Tooting & Mitcham United
108	Skegness Town	4–0	Lysaghts Sports
109	Slough Centre	1–3	Wycombe Wanderers
110	Slough Town	2–3	Oxford City
111	Somersham Town	1–7	Holbeach United
112	South Bank	2–0	Whitby Town
113	South Kirkby Colliery	3–6	Langwith Miners Welfare
114	South Normanton Miners Welfare	2–1	Newhall United
115	Spalding United	2–3	Corby Town
116	St Austell	3–4	Tavistock
117	Stafford Rangers	0–1	Stourbridge
118	Stamford	2–2	Wellingborough Town
119	Stevenage Town	1–2	Enfield
120	Swindon Victoria	2–2	Bulford United
121	Tow Law Town	0–1	Stanley United
122	Truro City	1–3	Barnstaple Town
123	Tunbridge Wells United	4–0	Haywards Heath
124	Upton Colliery	4–3	Frickley Colliery
125	Walton & Hersham	0–0	Carshalton Athletic
126	Wells City	2–1	Bridgwater Town
127	West Sleekburn Welfare	3–2	Hexham Hearts
128	Westbury United	1–2	Melksham Town
129	Whitstable	0–0	Epsom
130	Whitwick Colliery	14–0	Coalville Town
131	Wolsingham Welfare	7–3	Chilton Athletic
132	Wolverton Town & B R	1–0	Bletchley & Wipac Sports
133	Worksop Town	4–0	Langold W M C
134	Worthing	3–3	Bognor Regis Town

=== Replays ===
Tie	Home team	Score	Away team
3	Snowdown Colliery Welfare	5–0	Ashford Town (Kent)
6	Rainham Town	1–2	Barking
8	Cheltenham Town	1–2	Barry Town
13	Bridlington Central United	3–2	Billingham Synthonia
17	Minehead	2–2	Bodmin Town
26	Dulwich Hamlet	0–2	Canterbury City
30	St Albans City	0–1	Clapton
31	Ferryhill Athletic	2–1	Cockfield
54	Wimbledon	0–2	Hayes
55	Metropolitan Police	3–2	Hemel Hempstead
61	Dagenham	3–4	Ilford
69	Chelmsford City	2–1	Leytonstone
80	Gedling Colliery	6–1	Matlock Town
81	Fleetwood	3–1	Morecambe
118	Wellingborough Town	2–0	Stamford
120	Bulford United	1–3	Swindon Victoria
125	Carshalton Athletic	2–0	Walton & Hersham
129	Epsom	1–4	Whitstable
134	Bognor Regis Town	4–1	Worthing

=== 2nd replay ===
Tie	Home team	Score	Away team
17	Bodmin Town	2–3	Minehead

== 2nd qualifying round ==
=== Ties ===
Tie	Home team	Score	Away team
1	Alford United	2–2	Skegness Town
2	Annfield Plain	3–1	Boldon Colliery Welfare
3	Ashington	2–0	North Shields
4	Atherstone Town	2–1	Rugby Town
5	Barnet	3–0	Hoddesdon Town
6	Barnstaple Town	2–0	Ilfracombe Town
7	Barry Town	1–4	Gloucester City
8	Basingstoke Town	0–2	Winchester City
9	Beccles	3–1	Gothic
10	Bilston	1–4	Hednesford Town
11	Blackhall Colliery Welfare	2–2	Durham City
12	Bognor Regis Town	4–2	Eastbourne
13	Bourne Town	1–4	Corby Town
14	Bridlington Central United	1–6	North Skelton Athletic
15	Bromsgrove Rovers	3–1	Stourbridge
16	Brush Sports	3–4	Hinckley Athletic
17	Burton Albion	3–2	Moor Green
18	Canterbury City	2–1	Carshalton Athletic
19	Chelmsford City	2–2	Barking
20	Chesham United	5–5	Maidenhead United
21	Chorley	4–2	Nelson
22	Clandown	0–2	Wells City
23	Clapton	1–0	Enfield
24	Cramlington Welfare	1–7	West Sleekburn Welfare
25	Creswell Colliery	6–0	Sutton Town
26	Darwen	3–1	Mossley
27	Denaby United	6–0	Langwith Miners Welfare
28	Dorchester Town	4–0	Bournemouth Gasworks Athletic
29	Dover	2–1	Whitstable
30	Easington Colliery Welfare	3–2	Dawdon Colliery Welfare
31	Eynesbury Rovers	3–2	Wolverton Town & B R
32	Farsley Celtic	2–1	Ossett Town
33	Ferryhill Athletic	3–0	Evenwood Town
34	Flint Town United	5–1	Marine
35	Goole Town	4–2	Harrogate Railway Athletic
36	Gosport Borough Athletic	2–1	Cowes
37	Grantham	2–2	Boston United
38	Gresley Rovers	3–2	Gedling Colliery
39	Hayes	3–3	Hendon
40	Holbeach United	2–2	King's Lynn
41	Horsham	2–3	Tunbridge Wells United
42	Hyde United	3–1	Macclesfield
43	Lancaster City	2–3	Burscough
44	Leyton	2–1	Ilford
45	Melksham Town	4–2	Swindon Victoria
46	Merthyr Tydfil	3–1	Lovells Athletic
47	Metropolitan Police	2–4	Hounslow Town
48	Netherfield	7–0	Fleetwood
49	North Walsham Athletic	1–4	Gorleston
50	Oxford City	4–1	Wycombe Wanderers
51	Portland United	4–2	Bridport
52	Potton United	2–5	Biggleswade & District
53	Radstock Town	4–3	Peasedown Miners Welfare
54	Raleigh Athletic	0–1	Whitwick Colliery
55	Rawmarsh Welfare	1–0	Beighton Miners Welfare
56	Runcorn	0–1	Pwllheli & District
57	Scarborough	4–1	South Bank
58	Shirebrook Miners Welfare	0–4	Linby Colliery
59	Sittingbourne	2–1	Snowdown Colliery Welfare
60	South Normanton Miners Welfare	1–5	Ilkeston Town
61	Stalybridge Celtic	2–1	Altrincham
62	Stowmarket	2–3	Bury Town
63	Sudbury Town	3–1	Lowestoft Town
64	Tavistock	4–2	Minehead
65	Thetford Town	0–3	March Town United
66	Tonbridge	2–2	Margate
67	Trowbridge Town	1–1	Frome Town
68	Upton Colliery	3–2	Sheffield
69	Wellingborough Town	2–1	Rushden Town
70	Willington	0–1	Stanley United
71	Wolsingham Welfare	2–2	Shotton Colliery Welfare
72	Worksop Town	3–3	Norton Woodseats

=== Replays ===
Tie	Home team	Score	Away team
2	Skegness Town	5–1	Alford United
11	Durham City	4–1	Blackhall Colliery Welfare
19	Barking	1–1	Chelmsford City
20	Maidenhead United	5–3	Chesham United
37	Boston United	1–0	Grantham
39	Hendon	2–3	Hayes
40	King's Lynn	3–1	Holbeach United
66	Margate	0–1	Tonbridge
67	Frome Town	4–0	Trowbridge Town
71	Shotton Colliery Welfare	2–3	Wolsingham Welfare
72	Norton Woodseats	1–2	Worksop Town

=== 2nd replay ===
Tie	Home team	Score	Away team
19	Chelmsford City	3–2	Barking

== 3rd qualifying round ==
=== Ties ===
Tie	Home team	Score	Away team
1	Annfield Plain	5–1	Easington Colliery Welfare
2	Ashington	2–1	West Sleekburn Welfare
3	Atherstone Town	1–2	Burton Albion
4	Barnstaple Town	12–1	Tavistock
5	Burscough	0–1	Netherfield
6	Canterbury City	2–1	Sittingbourne
7	Clapton	0–1	Barnet
8	Corby Town	8–0	Wellingborough Town
9	Creswell Colliery	3–1	Linby Colliery
10	Darwen	1–1	Chorley
11	Denaby United	2–0	Upton Colliery
12	Durham City	1–3	Wolsingham Welfare
13	Eynesbury Rovers	3–2	Biggleswade & District
14	Farsley Celtic	2–0	Goole Town
15	Flint Town United	2–3	Pwllheli & District
16	Gloucester City	0–1	Merthyr Tydfil
17	Gorleston	4–0	Beccles
18	Gresley Rovers	2–2	Ilkeston Town
19	Hednesford Town	1–2	Bromsgrove Rovers
20	Hounslow Town	2–1	Hayes
21	Hyde United	8–1	Stalybridge Celtic
22	King's Lynn	1–3	March Town United
23	Leyton	0–1	Chelmsford City
24	Melksham Town	0–2	Frome Town
25	North Skelton Athletic	0–4	Scarborough
26	Oxford City	4–1	Maidenhead United
27	Portland United	1–5	Dorchester Town
28	Rawmarsh Welfare	0–3	Worksop Town
29	Skegness Town	2–6	Boston United
30	Stanley United	3–1	Ferryhill Athletic
31	Sudbury Town	3–1	Bury Town
32	Tonbridge	3–2	Dover
33	Tunbridge Wells United	4–0	Bognor Regis Town
34	Wells City	4–0	Radstock Town
35	Whitwick Colliery	2–2	Hinckley Athletic
36	Winchester City	3–0	Gosport Borough Athletic

=== Replays ===
Tie	Home team	Score	Away team
10	Chorley	5–4	Darwen
18	Ilkeston Town	5–4	Gresley Rovers
35	Hinckley Athletic	4–1	Whitwick Colliery

== 4th qualifying round ==
The teams that given byes to this round are Walthamstow Avenue, Yeovil Town, Gainsborough Trinity, Witton Albion, Weymouth, Rhyl, Hereford United, Wigan Athletic, Blyth Spartans, Wellington Town, Bath City, Peterborough United, Great Yarmouth Town, Headington United, Bedford Town, Hastings United, Kettering Town, Guildford City, Spennymoor United, Horden Colliery Welfare, Nuneaton Borough, Cambridge United, Selby Town and Newport I O W.

=== Ties ===
Tie	Home team	Score	Away team
1	Annfield Plain	1–2	Blyth Spartans
2	Ashington	2–3	Scarborough
3	Barnet	2–0	Great Yarmouth Town
4	Barnstaple Town	3–1	Yeovil Town
5	Bedford Town	5–2	March Town United
6	Burton Albion	0–1	Wellington Town
7	Cambridge United	3–1	Eynesbury Rovers
8	Chorley	1–4	Netherfield
9	Corby Town	3–1	Worksop Town
10	Denaby United	2–5	Creswell Colliery
11	Frome Town	3–1	Weymouth
12	Gorleston	1–2	Chelmsford City
13	Hastings United	1–0	Guildford City
14	Headington United	1–0	Tonbridge
15	Hinckley Athletic	2–1	Bromsgrove Rovers
16	Horden Colliery Welfare	1–0	Spennymoor United
17	Hounslow Town	3–0	Canterbury City
18	Hyde United	6–3	Witton Albion
19	Ilkeston Town	1–1	Kettering Town
20	Merthyr Tydfil	3–1	Bath City
21	Nuneaton Borough	3–2	Hereford United
22	Peterborough United	1–2	Boston United
23	Pwllheli & District	0–3	Rhyl
24	Selby Town	4–2	Gainsborough Trinity
25	Stanley United	5–1	Wolsingham Welfare
26	Sudbury Town	0–2	Walthamstow Avenue
27	Tunbridge Wells United	3–1	Oxford City
28	Wells City	1–4	Newport I O W
29	Wigan Athletic	3–1	Farsley Celtic
30	Winchester City	0–1	Dorchester Town

=== Replay ===
Tie	Home team	Score	Away team
19	Kettering Town	4–2	Ilkeston Town

== 1954–55 FA Cup ==
See 1954–55 FA Cup for details of the rounds from the first round proper onwards.
