= Alf Widdowson =

English footballer

Personal information
- Full name: Alfred Widdowson
- Date of birth: 16 September 1900
- Place of birth: Keyworth, England
- Date of death: 1970 (aged 74–75)
- Position: Inside forward

Senior career*
Years	Team	Apps	(Gls)
1918–1919	Boots Athletic		
1919–1928	Notts County	141	(39)
1928–1931	Coventry City	69	(16)
1932	Newark Town		
1933	Heanor Town		
Total		210	(55)
- * Club domestic league appearances and goals

Alfred Widdowson (16 September 1900 – 1970) was an English footballer who played in the Football League for Coventry City and Notts County.
