= John Starsmore =

English footballer (1901–1983)

Personal information
- Full name: John George Starsmore
- Date of birth: 20 December 1901
- Place of birth: Kettering, England
- Date of death: 1983 (aged 81)
- Place of death: Corby, England
- Height: 5 ft 10 in (1.78 m)
- Position: Forward

Senior career*
Years	Team	Apps	(Gls)
192?–1925	Desborough Town		
1925–1928	Kettering Town		
1928–1930	Coventry City	51	(17)
1930–1931	Kettering Town		
1931–1933	Swindon Town	66	(14)
1933–1934	Barrow	9	(1)
1934–1935	Dartford		
1935–19??	Kettering Town		
- * Club domestic league appearances and goals

John George Starsmore (20 December 1901 – 1983) was an English footballer who scored 32 goals from 126 appearances in the Football League playing for Coventry City, Swindon Town and Barrow in the 1920s and 1930s. He also played in non-league football for Kettering Town and Dartford. He played as a centre forward or inside forward.

== Life and career ==
Starsmore was born in Kettering, Northamptonshire, in 1901. He played non-league football for Desborough Town and Kettering Town before signing for Coventry City of the Third Division South in September 1928 for a "substantial" fee. He made his debut on 6 October, at home to Brentford, and scored the only goal of the match. He played regularly throughout the remainder of the 1928–29 season and at the start of 1929–30, but once Jimmy Loughlin established himself in the team, Starsmore made only five appearances in 1930, and left the club at the end of the season.

After a season back with Kettering Town, Starsmore signed for another Third Division South club, Swindon Town. He was ever-present in league and FA Cup in 1931–32, but played less the following season and was transfer-listed. He moved on to Barrow of the Third Division North, and scored once in nine league appearances, but spent several months in hospital in mid-season after breaking his upper arm in a road accident. He spent the 1934–35 campaign with Southern League club Dartford, scoring twice in the final to help his side win the Kent Senior Cup, and then returned to Kettering.

Starsmore died in Corby in 1983 at the age of 81.
