= Ralph David Widdowson =

American Professor (1903–1969)

- Born: November 3, 1903; Indiana County, Pennsylvania
- Died: November 23, 1969 (aged 66); State College, Pennsylvania
- Occupation: Professor of Industrial Arts
- Known for: Spring Garden Institute, 1964 mission to Turkey.

Ralph David Widdowson (November 3, 1903 – November 23, 1969) was an associate professor at Pennsylvania State University in the field of industrial education.

== Career ==
He graduated from Pennsylvania State University in 1934 with a Bachelor of Science in industrial arts. After graduation, Widdowson was employed at the Pennsylvania Department of Public Education as assistant state supervisor for vocational education.

Widdowson continued studies at Penn State, graduating with a Masters of Education degree in 1939, and he became associate professor of industrial arts at the University in 1950.

Widdowson was assigned as chief of the Penn State contract team at Taipei University in Taipei, Taiwan from November 1955 to May 1957. The Penn State team provided an advanced program in industrial education to the Republic of China.

After his retirement from Penn State in 1963, Widdowson became director of the Spring Garden Institute mission to Ankara, Turkey, as supported by the United States Agency for International Development. The stated mission was to help the Turkish government establish programs and curriculums for technical institutes, and to develop a faculty of trained instructors.

== Publications ==
Woodworking as an Area of Industrial Arts Instruction in Pennsylvania Public Schools, 1953

Sheet Metal as an Area of Industrial Arts Instruction in Pennsylvania Public Schools, 1953

== See also ==
- Pennsylvania State University
- Industrial education
- Spring Garden Institute
- United States Agency for International Development
