= Heanor Town F.C. =

Association football club in Heanor, England

Coordinates: 53.0116°N 1.3560°W

Heanor Town
- Full name: Heanor Town Football Club
- Nickname: The Lions
- Founded: 1883
- Ground: Town Ground, Heanor
- Capacity: 2,700 (100 seated)
- Chairman: Geoff Clarence
- Manager: Glen Clarence
- League: United Counties League Premier Division North
- 2024–25: United Counties League Premier Division North, 6th of 20
Home colours	Away colours

Heanor Town Football Club is a football club based in Heanor, Derbyshire, England. They are currently members of the United Counties League Premier Division North and play at the Town Ground.

== History ==
The club was established in 1883 in a meeting at the Rays Arms Hotel. In 1890 they were founder members of the Midland Amateur Alliance. The club reached the first round of the FA Cup in 1891–92, losing 4–1 at Aston Villa. When the league folded in 1893 they joined the Derbyshire Senior League, winning it at the first attempt, also reaching the first round of the FA Cup again, this time losing 1–0 at Nottingham Forest. The club then moved up to the Midland League, where they played for three seasons, with another FA Cup first round appearance in 1896–97 ending with a 1–0 defeat to Southampton St Mary's in a replay.

After dropping out of the Midland League in 1897, Heanor returned to the league in 1898. The 1898–99 season saw another FA Cup first round appearance, this time ending with a 3–0 defeat at home to Bury. Despite finishing sixth in 1899–1900, the club left the Midland League again. In 1921 they joined the Central Alliance. When the league folded in 1925 they rejoined the Derbyshire Senior League, before returning to the Midland League in 1926. However, in 1928 the club dropped back into the Derbyshire Senior League. They were runners-up in 1928–29 and again in 1932–33, after which the club joined the Central Combination.

Heanor were Central Combination runners-up in 1933–34 and went on win the league the following season. When the league folded in 1936, the club joined the Notts Amateur Combination. Following World War II they did not reform until 1951, when a team was entered to the Derby & District Amateur League. They moved up to the Notts Alliance the following season after moving to the Sir John Warren Ground in Loscoe, and after merging with the financially stricken Heanor Athletic in January 1953, Town took Athletic's place in Division One of the Central Alliance for the 1953–54 season. League reorganisation in 1956 led to the league being split into regional first divisions, with Heanor winning Division One North in 1956–57 and 1957–58. The following season saw their first appearance in the first round of the FA Cup in the 20th century, with a record crowd of 6,511 seeing the club lose 5–1 at home to Carlisle United. They were Division One North runners-up in 1959–60, before rejoining the Midland League in 1961. Another FA Cup first round appearance in 1963–64 ended with a 3–1 defeat at Bradford Park Avenue.

Heanor finished as runners-up in the Midland League in 1967–68 and 1968–69, before leaving to join the Premier Division of the West Midlands (Regional) League in 1972. They were Premier Division runners-up in their first season in the league, but returned to the Midland League after two seasons. When the league merged with the Yorkshire League to form the Northern Counties East League in 1982, Heanor were placed in the Premier Division. However, in 1986 they left the league to join the new Supreme Division of the Central Midlands League. They were Supreme Division runners-up in 1989–90, 1990–91 and 1992–93 before winning the league in 1994–95 and again in 1996–97.

In 2008 Heanor were founder members of the East Midlands Counties League. They were league champions in 2011–12, earning promotion to the Premier Division of the Northern Counties East League. After three seasons back in the league, the club were transferred to the Premier Division of the new Midland League in 2014. At the end of the 2017–18 season they took voluntary demotion to the East Midlands Counties League despite finishing in mid-table. In 2021 the club were promoted to the Premier Division North of the United Counties League based on their results in the abandoned 2019–20 and 2020–21 seasons.

== Colours ==
The club has worn black and white striped shirts since at least 1896, although in the 1950s wore black shirts with white collars and cuffs, and white shorts.

== Ground ==
After reforming in 1951, the club initially played at a field on Midland Road, which was shared with Park Street Methodist FC. In 1952 they moved to the Sir John Warren Ground in Loscoe, enabling a move up to the Notts Alliance, before relocating to the Town Ground in 1953 after merging with Heanor Athletic, who were already based at the ground.

== Honours ==
- Central Alliance
  - Division One North champions 1956–57, 1957–58
- Central Combination
  - Champions 1933–34
- Derbyshire Senior League
  - Champions 1893–94
- East Midlands Counties League
  - Champions 2011–12
- Central Midlands League
  - Supreme Division champions 1994–95, 1996–97
  - League Cup winners 2006–07
- Derbyshire Senior Cup
  - Winners 1892–93, 1893–94, 1965–66, 1966–67, 1967–68, 1968–69, 1970–71, 1978–79

== Records ==
- Best FA Cup performance: First round, 1891–92, 1893–94, 1896–97, 1898–99, 1958–59, 1963–64
- Best FA Trophy performance: Second qualifying round, 1970–71, 1971–72, 1974–75, 1981–82
- Best FA Vase performance: Quarter-finals, 2024–25
- Record attendance: 6,511 v Carlisle United, FA Cup first round, 15 November 1958
- Biggest win: 16–2 vs Linby Colliery, 1956–57
- Heaviest defeat: 2–16 vs Mansfield Town, 1957–58
- Most goals: Kieran Debrouwer, 161

== See also ==
- Heanor Town F.C. players
- Heanor Town F.C. managers
