= Greenwood Meadows F.C. =

Coordinates: 52°55′33.61″N 1°10′11.23″W

Greenwood Meadows
- Full name: Greenwood Meadows Football Club
- Nickname: The Magpies
- Founded: 1987
- Dissolved: 2017
- Ground: Lenton Lane, Nottingham
- Capacity: 700 (100 seated)
- 2016–17: East Midlands Counties League, 19th of 20
Home colours

Greenwood Meadows Football Club was a football club based in Nottingham, England. The club last played in the East Midlands Counties Football League during the 2016–17 season.

== History ==
The club was established in 1987 following the amalgamation of Greenwood (founded 1956) and Meadows Albion. Both clubs were members of the Notts Alliance, with Meadows Albion in the Senior Division and Greenwood in Division One. The new club took Greenwood's place in Division One. After finishing as Division One runners-up in 1989–90, the club were promoted to the Senior Division. Despite finishing second-from-bottom in 1994–95, the club avoided relegation to Division One, and after a fifth-place finish in 1996–97, they moved up to the Premier Division of the Central Midlands League.

In 2000–01 Greenwood Meadows were Premier Division runners-up, earning promotion to the Supreme Division. In 2008 they became founder members of the East Midlands Counties League. After three mid-table finishes, the club began to struggle and finished bottom of the league in 2014–15 and 2015–16. They failed to fulfill their last six fixtures during the 2016–17 season and were deducted 18 points and were relegated to the South Division of the Central Midlands League at the end of the season. However, they resigned from the league shortly before the start of the 2017–18 season.

== Records ==
- Best FA Cup performance: Extra preliminary round, 2009–10, 2010–11, 2011–12
- Best FA Vase performance: First round 2010–11, 2011–12, 2012–13

== See also ==
- Greenwood Meadows F.C. players
