= Blaby & Whetstone Athletic F.C. =

Association football club in England

Coordinates: 52°34′06.22″N 1°10′51.82″W

Blaby & Whetstone Athletic
- Full name: Blaby & Whetstone Athletic Football Club
- Nickname: Warwick Roaders
- Founded: 1993
- Ground: Warwick Road, Whetstone
- Capacity: 1,000
- Chairman: Jason Smith
- Manager: Tony Maisto
Home colours

Blaby & Whetstone Athletic Football Club is a football club based in Whetstone, near Leicester, Leicestershire, England. They play at Warwick Road.

== History ==
The club was founded in 1928 as Whetstone Athletic and initially played in the Leicester City League. They joined Division Two of the Leicestershire Senior League in 1967, and after finishing third in 1970–71, were promoted to Division One. However, they finished bottom of Division One the following season, and were relegated back to Division Two. In 1974–75 Whetstone were Division Two runners-up and were promoted to Division One. However, they were relegated again the following season after finishing second-from-bottom of Division One. In 1983 Division Two was renamed Division One, and in 1993 the club adopted their current name after moving to the Warwick Road and absorbing the Blaby Boys Club.

The 1999–2000 season saw Blaby & Whetstone finish as Division One runners-up, earning promotion to the Premier Division. They won the Battle of Britain Cup in 2004–05, beating Thurnby Rangers in the final, and went on to win both the League Cup and the Leicestershire and Rutland Senior Cup in 2007–08, claiming the latter with a 2–0 win against Anstey Town after extra time. The following season they were runners-up in the Premier Division. After finishing third in 2010–11, they were promoted to the East Midlands Counties League. In 2013–14 they won the Westerby Cup, beating Quorn 2–0 in the final.

In March 2018, Blaby & Whetstone resigned from the East Midlands Counties League. They were subsequently accepted into the Premier Division of the Leicestershire Senior League for the 2018–19 season. However, they resigned from the league midway through the 2022–23 season.

== Honours ==
- Leicestershire Senior League
  - League Cup winners 2007–08
- Westerby Cup
  - Winners 2013–14
- Leicestershire and Rutland Senior Cup
  - Winners 2007–08
- Battle of Britain Cup
  - Winners 2004–05

== Records ==
- Best FA Cup performance: Second qualifying round, 2013–14, 2014–15
- Best FA Vase performance: Third round, 2003–04

== See also ==
- Blaby & Whetstone Athletic F.C. players
