= 2026–27 United Counties League =

United Counties League
- Season: 2026–27

The 2026–27 season is the 120th in the history of the United Counties League, a football competition in England. The United Counties League operates three divisions in the English football league system, the Premier Divisions North and South at Step 5 and Division One at Step 6.

The allocations for Steps 5 and 6 this season were announced by The Football Association on 14 May 2026.

== Premier Division North ==
At the end of the 2025–26 season, six teams left the division:

- Boston Town, promoted to the Northern Premier League Division One Midlands
- Grantham Town, promoted to the Northern Premier League Division One Midlands
- Harrowby United, relegated to Division One.
- Melton Town, resigned to the Leicestershire Senior League.
- Newark and Sherwood United, resigned to the Nottinghamshire Football League.
- Wisbech Town, transferred to Eastern Counties League Premier Division.

Before the 2026–27 season, four teams joined the division:

- Aylestone Park, transferred from Premier Division South
- Hinckley, transferred from Premier Division South
- Leicester Nirvana, transferred from Premier Division South
- Sheffield, transferred from Northern Counties East League Premier Division

=== League table ===
Pos	Team	Pld	W	D	L	GF	GA	GD	Pts	Promotion, qualification or relegation
1	Eastwood	14	12	1	1	53	17	+36	37	Promotion to the Northern Premier League
2	Belper United	16	12	0	4	51	18	+33	36	Qualification for the play-offs
3	Leicester Nirvana	17	8	4	5	32	29	+3	28	Qualification for the play-offs
4	Newark Town	15	8	1	6	39	30	+9	25	Qualification for the play-offs
5	Sherwood Colliery	16	8	1	7	33	35	−2	25	Qualification for the play-offs
6	AFC Mansfield	14	7	3	4	33	27	+6	24	
7	Gresley Rovers	17	7	3	7	23	30	−7	24	
8	Clay Cross Town	17	7	3	7	29	37	−8	24	
9	Kimberley Miners Welfare	18	7	2	9	23	34	−11	23	
10	Sheffield	14	5	3	6	19	19	0	18	
11	Aylestone Park	16	5	3	8	33	39	−6	18	
12	Heanor Town	13	5	3	5	19	25	−6	18	
13	Ashby Ivanhoe	13	4	3	6	25	27	−2	15	
14	Skegness Town	15	3	6	6	21	26	−5	15	
15	Blackstones	15	4	3	8	26	36	−10	15	
16	Hinckley	15	4	3	8	21	32	−11	15	
17	Hucknall Town	15	4	3	8	17	29	−12	15	Relegation to Division One
18	Deeping Rangers	14	3	3	8	25	32	−7	12	Relegation to Division One

Updated to match(es) played on 21 November 2026. Source: The FA Full-Time
Rules for classification: 1) points; 2) goal difference; 3) number of goals scored; 4) number of matches won; 5) head-to-head results

=== Results table ===
Home \ Away	MAN	ASH	AYP	BEL	BLA	CLA	DEE	EAS	GRE	HEA	HIN	HUC	KIM	LEI	NEW	SFC	SHE	SKE
AFC Mansfield	—					3–1					6–1	0–2			4–1	2–1		1–3
Ashby Ivanhoe	1–1	—	6–1			0–1		1–5	2–0				6–0				1–3	
Aylestone Park	2–3		—	2–5			3–0	3–6		2–2		2–0	3–0					
Belper United	5–0	7–0		—		1–3					5–2			7–0		3–2	2–1	2–0
Blackstones	1–4		3–1	1–3	—	1–1		1–4				2–2			3–2			5–2
Clay Cross Town			2–3		3–2	—	3–0		2–3	1–1	0–1			3–2				1–1
Deeping Rangers	3–3	1–1		2–1			—		4–0		3–3		1–2		1–3			
Eastwood	3–3			2–0			6–3	—	6–0			4–0		3–4			4–1	
Gresley Rovers	1–3		1–0		1–2				—	2–0	2–1		1–2		2–1	0–0		3–1
Heanor Town				0–4			3–2		0–4	—		2–1			3–4	1–0		
Hinckley					3–1			0–4		2–3	—	0–0	0–1	1–0		3–1	1–2	
Hucknall Town		2–4	0–3	2–0		1–2	1–4		1–1			—		1–3				3–2
Kimberley Miners Welfare				0–3	0–0	2–4		0–2		2–1			—	1–1	0–2	1–3	7–0	
Leicester Nirvana	2–0		2–1		3–1	4–0			1–1	0–2			4–1	—	1–3		3–2	
Newark Town			3–3	1–3		8–1					2–1		3–0		—	0–1	2–4	
Sheffield		3–2	4–2					0–2				0–1		1–1		—		
Sherwood Colliery		3–1	2–2		3–1	4–1	1–0		4–1				1–2		2–5	0–2	—	
Skegness Town		0–0			4–2		2–1	1–2		1–1	2–2		0–1	1–1		1–1		—

Updated to match(es) played on 21/11/2026. Source: FA Full-Time Grid
Legend: Blue = home team win; Yellow = draw; Red = away team win.
For upcoming matches, an "a" indicates there is an article about the rivalry between the two participants.

=== Stadia and locations ===
Location of the clubs in the 2026–27 United Counties League Premier Division North

Club	Location	Stadium	Capacity
AFC Mansfield	Mansfield (Forest Town)	Forest Town Arena	1,600
Ashby Ivanhoe	Ashby-de-la-Zouch	NFU Sports Ground	1,000
Aylestone Park	Leicester	Saffron Lane, Wigston	1,128
Belper United	Belper	Station Road, Mickleover (groundshare with Mickleover)	1,500
Blackstones	Stamford	Lincoln Road	1,000
Clay Cross Town	Clay Cross	Mill Lane	1,000
Deeping Rangers	Market Deeping	Haydon Whitham Stadium	2,000
Eastwood	Eastwood	Coronation Park	2,500
Gresley Rovers	Church Gresley	Moat Ground	2,400
Heanor Town	Heanor	Town Ground	2,700
Hinckley	Hinckley	Kirkby Road, Barwell (groundshare with Barwell)	2,500
Hucknall Town	Hucknall	RM Stadium	4,000
Kimberley Miners Welfare	Kimberley	Stag Ground	1,000
Leicester Nirvana	Leicester (Hamilton)	Hamilton Park	1,000
Newark Town	Newark-on-Trent	YMCA Sports Village	1,000
Sheffield	Dronfield	Home of Football Ground	2,089
Sherwood Colliery	Mansfield Woodhouse	Debdale Park	1,000
Skegness Town	Skegness	Vertigo Stadium	1,000

== Premier Division South ==
At the end of the 2025–26 season, ten teams left the division:

- Aylestone Park, transferred to Premier Division North
- Bugbrooke St Michaels, relegated to Spartan South Midlands League Division One
- Coventry United, promoted to the Northern Premier League Division One Midlands
- Easington Sports, transferred to Combined Counties League Premier Division North
- GNG Oadby Town, relegated to the Midland League Division One
- Hinckley, transferred to Premier Division North
- Leicester Nirvana, transferred to Premier Division North
- March Town United, transferred to Eastern Counties League Premier Division
- Newport Pagnell Town, transferred to Spartan South Midlands League Premier Division
- Nuneaton Town, promoted to the Northern Premier League Division One Midlands

Before the 2026–27 season, nine teams joined the division:

- Coton Green, transferred from the Midland League Premier Division
- Coventry Sphinx, relegated from the Northern Premier League Division One Midlands
- Desborough Town, promoted from the Spartan South Midlands League Division One
- FC Stratford, promoted from the Hellenic League Division One
- FC Peterborough, promoted from the Eastern Counties League Division One North
- Highgate United, transferred from the Midland League Premier Division
- Knowle, promoted from the Midland League Division One
- Rugby Town, relegated from the Northern Premier League Division One Midlands
- St Neots Town, relegated from the Northern Premier League Division One Midlands

=== League table ===
Pos	Team	Pld	W	D	L	GF	GA	GD	Pts	Promotion, qualification or relegation
1	Knowle	14	10	3	1	32	13	+19	33	Promotion to the Northern Premier League
2	Rugby Town	16	9	4	3	47	17	+30	31	Qualification for the play-offs
3	Northampton ON Chenecks	13	9	3	1	26	11	+15	30	Qualification for the play-offs
4	Lutterworth Town	16	7	6	3	32	19	+13	27	Qualification for the play-offs
5	Coventry Sphinx	17	8	3	6	37	27	+10	27	Qualification for the play-offs
6	Moulton	16	8	3	5	31	22	+9	27	
7	St Neots Town	14	7	4	3	30	17	+13	25	
8	Atherstone Town	13	8	1	4	30	19	+11	25	
9	Northampton Sileby Rangers	15	7	3	5	24	20	+4	24	
10	Desborough Town	14	6	4	4	23	20	+3	22	
11	Daventry Town	15	6	3	6	26	25	+1	21	
12	Yaxley	15	6	1	8	25	34	−9	19	
13	Coton Green	16	4	5	7	27	31	−4	17	
14	Godmanchester Rovers	14	5	2	7	16	26	−10	17	
15	FC Peterborough	17	5	1	11	22	33	−11	16	
16	Eynesbury Rovers	16	2	3	11	15	37	−22	9	
17	Histon	14	2	2	10	13	35	−22	8	
18	Highgate United	17	0	3	14	8	58	−50	3	Relegation to Division One
19	FC Stratford	0	0	0	0	0	0	0	0	Resigned from the league (Note: On 7 November 2026, FC Stratford withdrew from the league, and their record of Pld14 W2 D2 L10 GF18 GA37 Pts7 was expunged.)

Updated to match(es) played on 21 November 2026. Source: The FA Full-Time
Rules for classification: 1) points; 2) goal difference; 3) number of goals scored; 4) number of matches won; 5) head-to-head results

=== Results table ===
Home \ Away	ATH	COT	CVS	DAV	DES	EYN	FCS	PET	GOD	HGU	HIS	KNO	LUT	MOU	NOC	NSR	RUG	STN	YAX
Atherstone Town	—																		
Coton Green		—																	
Coventry Sphinx			—																
Daventry Town				—															
Desborough Town					—														
Eynesbury Rovers						—													
FC Stratford							—												
FC Peterborough								—											
Godmanchester Rovers									—										
Highgate United										—									
Histon											—								
Knowle												—							
Lutterworth Town													—						
Moulton														—					
Northampton ON Chenecks															—				
Northampton Sileby Rangers																—			
Rugby Town																	—		
St Neots Town																		—	
Yaxley																			—

Updated to match(es) played on unknown. Source: FA Full-Time Grid
Legend: Blue = home team win; Yellow = draw; Red = away team win.
For upcoming matches, an "a" indicates there is an article about the rivalry between the two participants.

=== Stadia and locations ===
Location of the clubs in the 2026–27 United Counties League Premier Division South

Club	Location	Stadium	Capacity
Atherstone Town	Atherstone	Sheepy Road	3,500
Coton Green	Tamworth	New Mill Lane, Fazeley	1,500
Coventry Sphinx	Coventry	Sphinx Drive	1,000
Daventry Town	Daventry	Elderstubbs	1,855
Desborough Town	Desborough	Waterworks Field	1,000
Eynesbury Rovers	Eynesbury	Alfred Hall Memorial Ground	1,000
FC Stratford	Stratford-upon-Avon	Knights Lane, Tiddington (groundshare with Stratford Town)	3,000
FC Peterborough	Peterborough	Millfield Autoparts Stadium	1,000
Godmanchester Rovers	Godmanchester	Bearscroft Lane	1,050
Highgate United	Shirley	The Coppice	2,000
Histon	Histon	Bridge Road, Impington	4,300
Knowle	Knowle	Robins' Nest	1,000
Lutterworth Town	Lutterworth	Dunley Way	1,000
Moulton	Moulton	Brunting Road	1,000
Northampton ON Chenecks	Northampton	Old Northamptonians Sports Ground	1,000
Northampton Sileby Rangers	Northampton	Fernie Fields	1,000
Rugby Town	Rugby	Butlin Road	5,000
St Neots Town	St Neots	New Rowley Park	3,500
Yaxley	Yaxley	Leading Drove	1,000

== Division One ==
At the end of the 2025–26 season, six teams left the division:

- Coalville Town, transferred to Midland League Division One
- FCV Grace Dieu, transferred to Midland League Division One
- Holwell Sports, transferred to Midland League Division One
- Rainworth Miners Welfare, relegated to Nottinghamshire Football League
- Retford, promoted to the Northern Counties East League Premier Division
- Retford United, promoted to the Northern Counties East League Premier Division

Before the 2026–27 season, five teams joined the division:

- Cotgrave, promoted from the Nottinghamshire Senior League
- Harrowby United, relegated from Premier Division North
- Louth Town, transferred from the Northern Counties East League Division One
- Maltby Main, transferred from the Northern Counties East League Division One
- Selston, promoted from the Central Midlands Alliance League

=== League table ===
Pos	Team	Pld	W	D	L	GF	GA	GD	Pts	Promotion, qualification or relegation
1	Clipstone	20	16	1	3	60	19	+41	49	Promotion to the Premier Division
2	Staveley Miners Welfare	19	13	4	2	55	26	+29	43	Qualification for the play-offs
3	South Normanton Athletic	19	12	4	3	44	15	+29	40	Qualification for the play-offs
4	Southwell City	19	11	4	4	46	26	+20	37	Qualification for the play-offs
5	Stapleford Town	21	10	4	7	39	29	+10	34	Qualification for the play-offs
6	Shirebrook Town	19	7	9	3	38	22	+16	30	
7	Sleaford Town	19	8	6	5	31	20	+11	30	
8	Sandiacre Town	19	8	4	7	21	24	−3	28	
9	Dunkirk	21	8	4	9	28	42	−14	28	
10	West Bridgford	20	7	6	7	28	32	−4	27	
11	Clifton All Whites	20	7	4	9	44	44	0	25	
12	Selston	21	6	7	8	35	38	−3	25	
13	Louth Town	19	6	7	6	27	31	−4	25	
14	Maltby Main	20	7	4	9	30	35	−5	25	
15	Cotgrave	18	7	3	8	39	37	+2	24	
16	Harrowby United	17	7	3	7	26	31	−5	24	
17	Swallownest	19	6	5	8	30	37	−7	23	
18	Pinxton	19	5	5	9	26	33	−7	20	
19	Dronfield Town	20	5	4	11	31	48	−17	19	
20	Radford	20	4	6	10	25	32	−7	18	Possible relegation to regional feeder leagues
21	Pinchbeck United	18	2	3	13	17	57	−40	9	Possible relegation to regional feeder leagues
22	Gedling Miners Welfare	19	2	1	16	16	58	−42	7	Possible relegation to regional feeder leagues

Updated to match(es) played on 21 November 2026. Source: The FA Full-Time
Rules for classification: 1) points; 2) goal difference; 3) number of goals scored; 4) number of matches won; 5) head-to-head results

=== Results table ===
Home \ Away	CAW	CLP	COT	DRO	DUN	GMW	HAR	LOU	MAL	PNB	PNX	RAD	SAN	SEL	SHI	SLE	SNA	SWC	STP	SMW	SWA	WES
Clifton All Whites	—																					
Clipstone		—																				
Cotgrave			—																			
Dronfield Town				—																		
Dunkirk					—																	
Gedling Miners Welfare						—																
Harrowby United							—															
Louth Town								—														
Maltby Main									—													
Pinchbeck United										—												
Pinxton											—											
Radford												—										
Sandiacre Town													—									
Selston														—								
Shirebrook Town															—							
Sleaford Town																—						
South Normanton Athletic																	—					
Southwell City																		—				
Stapleford Town																			—			
Staveley Miners Welfare																				—		
Swallownest																					—	
West Bridgford																						—

Updated to match(es) played on unknown. Source: FA Full-Time Grid
Legend: Blue = home team win; Yellow = draw; Red = away team win.
For upcoming matches, an "a" indicates there is an article about the rivalry between the two participants.

=== Stadia and locations ===
Location of the clubs in the 2026–27 United Counties League Division One
Location of the clubs in the 2026–27 United Counties League Division One

Club	Location	Stadium	Capacity
Clifton All Whites	Nottingham (Clifton)	Green Lane	1,000
Clipstone	Clipstone	Lido Ground	1,000
Cotgrave	Cotgrave	Woodview	1,000
Dronfield Town	Dronfield	Stonelow Ground	500
Dunkirk	Nottingham (Dunkirk)	Lenton Lane	1,500
Gedling Miners Welfare	Gedling	Plains Road	2,000
Harrowby United	Grantham	Dickens Road	1,500
Louth Town	Saltfleetby	Marshlands	500
Maltby Main	Maltby	Muglet Lane	2,000
Pinchbeck United	Pinchbeck	Sir Halley Stewart Field	2,700
Pinxton	Pinxton	The Welfare Ground	2,000
Radford	Nottingham (Radford)	Selhurst Street	1,000
Sandiacre Town	Sandiacre	St Giles Park	1,000
Selston	Selston	Mansfield Road	1,000
Shirebrook Town	Shirebrook	Langwith Road	2,000
Sleaford Town	Sleaford	Eslaforde Park	1,000
South Normanton Athletic	South Normanton	Lees Lane	3,000
Southwell City	Southwell	Centenary Ground, Brinkley	
Stapleford Town	Stapleford	Hickings Lane	
Staveley Miners Welfare	Staveley	Inkersall Road	5,000
Swallownest	Swallownest	(The Swall Siro) Miners Welfare Ground	500
West Bridgford	West Bridgford	Regatta Way	1,000
