= 2022–23 United Counties League =

The 2022–23 season was the 116th in the history of the United Counties League, a football competition in England. The league operated three divisions in the English football league system, the Premier Divisions North and South at Step 5 and Division One at Step 6.

The allocations for Steps 5 and 6 this season were announced by The Football Association on 12 May 2022, and were subject to appeals.

== Premier Division North ==
United Counties League Premier Division North
- Season: 2022–23
- Champions: Anstey Nomads
- Promoted: Anstey Nomads; Quorn
- Relegated: Heather St John's; Selston
- Matches: 380
- Goals: 1,278 (3.36 per match)

The Premier Division featured 15 clubs which competed in the division last season, along with five new clubs.

- Promoted from Division One:
  - Belper United
  - Kimberley Miners Welfare
- Transferred from the Northern Counties East League
  - AFC Mansfield
  - Sherwood Colliery
- Plus:
  - Wisbech Town, relegated from the Northern Premier League

Also, Newark were renamed Newark and Sherwood United.

=== League table ===
Pos	Team	Pld	W	D	L	GF	GA	GD	Pts	Promotion, qualification or relegation
1	Anstey Nomads	38	29	6	3	91	20	+71	93	Promoted to the Northern Premier League
2	Quorn	38	25	7	6	96	53	+43	82	Qualified for an inter-step play-off, then promoted to the Northern Premier League
3	Loughborough Students	38	24	9	5	98	32	+66	81	
4	Melton Town	38	25	4	9	84	49	+35	79	
5	Sleaford Town	38	24	5	9	77	38	+39	77	
6	Boston Town	38	19	10	9	58	46	+12	67	
7	Sherwood Colliery	38	22	3	13	76	42	+34	63	
8	Newark and Sherwood United	38	17	11	10	78	54	+24	62	
9	Skegness Town	38	19	5	14	52	42	+10	62	
10	Kimberley Miners Welfare	38	16	11	11	78	61	+17	59	
11	Wisbech Town	38	16	5	17	64	85	−21	53	
12	Deeping Rangers	38	14	7	17	74	74	0	49	
13	Heanor Town	38	14	5	19	73	75	−2	47	
14	Belper United	38	11	10	17	59	84	−25	43	
15	Leicester Nirvana	38	9	8	21	46	75	−29	35	Transferred to the Premier Division South
16	Eastwood	38	7	7	24	41	100	−59	28	
17	Pinchbeck United	38	8	3	27	40	86	−46	27	
18	AFC Mansfield	38	5	8	25	35	88	−53	23	
19	Heather St John's	38	4	9	25	31	74	−43	21	Relegated to the Midland League
20	Selston	38	3	5	30	27	100	−73	14	Relegated to Division One

Source: The FA Full-Time
Rules for classification: 1) points; 2) goal difference; 3) number of goals scored; 4) number of matches won; 5) head-to-head results

=== Inter-step play-off ===
29 April 2023	Great Wakering Rovers	0–5	Quorn	Great Wakering
15:00		Report	Webb 9', 20' (pen.); Dube 29', 40'; Carlke 79'	Stadium: Burroughs Park; Attendance: 230; Referee: Christopher Hastings

=== Stadia and locations ===
Location of the Premier Division North clubs

Club	Location	Stadium	Capacity
AFC Mansfield	Mansfield (Forest Town)	Forest Town Stadium	
Anstey Nomads	Anstey	Cropston Road	
Belper United	Belper	Christchurch Meadow (Note: home of Belper Town (groundshare))	
Boston Town	Boston	Tattershall Road	6,000
Deeping Rangers	Market Deeping	Haydon Whitham Stadium	2,000
Eastwood	Eastwood	Coronation Park	
Heanor Town	Heanor	Town Ground	
Heather St John's	Heather	St John's Park	
Kimberley Miners Welfare	Kimberley	Stag Ground	
Leicester Nirvana	Leicester	Hamilton Park	
Loughborough Students	Loughborough	Loughborough University Stadium	3,000
Melton Town	Melton Mowbray	Melton Sports Village	
Newark and Sherwood United	Collingham	Station Road	
Pinchbeck United	Spalding	Sir Halley Stewart Field	2,700
Quorn	Quorn	Farley Way Stadium	1,400
Selston	Selston	Mansfield Road	
Sherwood Colliery	Mansfield Woodhouse	Debdale Park	
Skegness Town	Skegness	Vertigo Stadium	
Sleaford Town	Sleaford	Eslaforde Park	1,000
Wisbech Town	Wisbech	Fenland Stadium	1,118

== Premier Division South ==
United Counties League Premier Division South
- Season: 2022–23
- Champions: Coventry Sphinx
- Promoted: Coventry Sphinx; Rugby Town
- Relegated: Long Buckby; Rothwell Corinthians
- Matches: 306
- Goals: 1,078 (3.52 per match)

The Premier Division featured 15 clubs which competed in the division last season, along with three new clubs:

- Histon, relegated from the Northern Premier League
- March Town United, transferred from the Eastern Counties League
- Milton Keynes Irish, transferred from the Spartan South Midlands League

The club finishing the season in second position was initially required to play in an inter-step playoff with a team from step 4. Due to ground grading failures higher up the pyramid, three step 4 clubs were reprieved, and the three step 5 runners-up with the highest PPG (points per game) were automatically promoted. Rugby Town were one of those three.

=== League table ===
Pos	Team	Pld	W	D	L	GF	GA	GD	Pts	Promotion, qualification or relegation
1	Coventry Sphinx	34	28	2	4	106	22	+84	86	Promoted to the Northern Premier League
2	Rugby Town	34	26	5	3	99	36	+63	83	Promoted to the Northern Premier League
3	Newport Pagnell Town	34	22	7	5	83	34	+49	73	
4	Wellingborough Town	34	20	7	7	74	47	+27	67	
5	Milton Keynes Irish	34	19	8	7	67	38	+29	65	Transferred to the Spartan South Midlands League
6	Histon	34	17	6	11	73	53	+20	57	
7	March Town United	34	15	7	12	68	54	+14	52	
8	Coventry United	34	15	3	16	69	68	+1	48	
9	Desborough Town	34	12	8	14	48	59	−11	44	
10	Bugbrooke St Michaels	34	13	5	16	44	59	−15	44	
11	Easington Sports	34	12	5	17	38	46	−8	41	
12	Cogenhoe United	34	10	8	16	53	58	−5	38	
13	GNG Oadby Town	34	10	4	20	54	85	−31	34	
14	Godmanchester Rovers	34	8	8	18	39	70	−31	32	
15	Eynesbury Rovers	34	9	4	21	52	88	−36	31	
16	Lutterworth Town	34	9	4	21	45	91	−46	31	
17	Rothwell Corinthians	34	5	7	22	35	74	−39	22	Relegated to the Spartan South Midlands League
18	Long Buckby	34	4	6	24	31	96	−65	18	Relegated to the Spartan South Midlands League

Source: The FA Full-Time
Rules for classification: 1) points; 2) goal difference; 3) number of goals scored; 4) number of matches won; 5) head-to-head results

=== Stadia and locations ===
Location of the Premier Division South clubs

Club	Location	Stadium	Capacity
Bugbrooke St. Michaels	Bugbrooke	Birds Close	2,500
Cogenhoe United	Cogenhoe	Compton Park	5,000
Coventry Sphinx	Coventry	Sphinx Drive	
Coventry United	Coventry	Butts Park Arena (Note: home of Coventry Rugby Club (groundshare))	4,000
Desborough Town	Desborough	Waterworks Field	
Easington Sports	Easington	Addison Road	
Eynesbury Rovers	Eynesbury	Alfred Hall Memorial Ground	
GNG Oadby Town	Oadby	Wigston Road	3,000
Godmanchester Rovers	Godmanchester	Bearscroft Lane	
Histon	Impington	Bridge Road	4,300
Long Buckby	Long Buckby	Station Road	1,000
Lutterworth Town	Lutterworth	Dunley Way	
March Town United	March	GER Sports Ground	
Milton Keynes Irish	Milton Keynes	Manor Fields	
Newport Pagnell Town	Newport Pagnell	Willen Road	2,000
Rothwell Corinthians	Rothwell	Sergeants Lawn	
Rugby Town	Rugby	Butlin Road	6,000
Wellingborough Town	Wellingborough	London Road	2,500

== Division One ==
United Counties League Division One
- Season: 2022–23
- Champions: Aylestone Park
- Promoted: Aylestone Park; Hucknall Town
- Relegated: Grantham Town academy
- Matches: 420
- Goals: 1,697 (4.04 per match)
- Top goalscorer: Paul Pallett (Birstall United) (39 goals)

Division One featured 16 clubs which competed in the division last season, along with six new clubs.

- Promoted from the Central Midlands Alliance:
  - Bildworth Welfare
  - Newark Town
- Transferred from the Northern Counties East League:
  - Clipstone
  - Rainworth Miners Welfare
- Plus:
  - Grantham Town academy, promoted from the Lincolnshire League
  - Southwell City, promoted from the Nottinghamshire Senior League

=== League table ===
Pos	Team	Pld	W	D	L	GF	GA	GD	Pts	Promotion, qualification or relegation
1	Aylestone Park (C, P)	40	30	5	5	153	41	+112	95	Promoted to the Premier Division South
2	Birstall United	40	27	8	5	123	42	+81	89	Qualified for the play-offs
3	Bourne Town	40	27	7	6	118	47	+71	88	Qualified for the play-offs
4	Hucknall Town (O, P)	40	25	7	8	96	46	+50	82	Qualified for the play-offs, then promoted to the Premier Division North
5	Newark Town	40	25	5	10	115	56	+59	80	Qualified for the play-offs
6	Radford	40	25	7	8	107	44	+63	79 (Note: Radford were deducted three points for fielding an ineligible player.)	
7	Clipstone	40	24	3	13	83	55	+28	75	
8	Blackstones	40	17	13	10	76	62	+14	64	
9	Harrowby United	40	14	11	15	76	85	−9	53	
10	Kirby Muxloe	40	16	3	21	84	99	−15	51	
11	Dunkirk	40	15	5	20	82	82	0	50	
12	Clifton All Whites	40	14	8	18	70	95	−25	50	
13	Rainworth Miners Welfare	40	14	5	21	62	93	−31	47	
14	Southwell City	40	13	7	20	67	88	−21	46	
15	Barrow Town (R)	40	12	5	23	60	89	−29	41	Resigned to the Leicestershire Senior League
16	West Bridgford	40	13	1	26	56	88	−32	40	
17	Holwell Sports	40	11	7	22	73	111	−38	40	
18	Saffron Dynamo	40	12	4	24	53	98	−45	40	
19	Gedling Miners Welfare	40	10	6	24	62	106	−44	36	
20	St Andrews	40	9	5	26	46	133	−87	32	
21	Grantham Town academy (R)	40	4	4	32	35	137	−102	16	Relegated to feeder league
22	Blidworth Welfare	0	0	0	0	0	0	0	0 (Note: Blidworth Welfare resigned from the league on 7 November 2022 and their playing record of P15 W3 D2 L10 GF18 GA42 Pts11 was expunged.)	Resigned from the league, record expunged

Source: The FA Full-Time
Rules for classification: 1) points; 2) goal difference; 3) number of goals scored; 4) number of matches won; 5) head-to-head results
(C) Champions; (O) Play-off winners; (P) Promoted; (R) Relegated

=== Play-offs ===
Semi-finals
2	Birstall United	3
5	Newark Town	2
3	Bourne Town	1 (2)
4	Hucknall Town	1 (4)

Final
2	Birstall United	1 (3)
4	Hucknall Town	1 (5)

==== Semifinals ====
22 April	Bourne Town	1–1 (a.e.t.) (2–4 p)	Hucknall Town	Bourne
15:00	Munton 34'	Report	Westcarr 21'	Stadium: Abbey Lawn; Attendance: 893; Referee: Thomas Burt

22 April	Birstall United	3–2	Newark Town	Birstall
15:00	Connor-Watts; Pallett	Report	Andersen; Chambers	Stadium: Meadow Lane; Attendance: 400; Referee: Ryan Allison

==== Final ====
29 April	Birstall United	1–1 (a.e.t.) (3–5 p)	Hucknall Town	Birstall
15:00	Pallett 56'	Report	Knight 54'	Stadium: Meadow Lane; Attendance: 850; Referee: Gary Caley

=== Stadia and locations ===
Location of Division One clubs

Club	Location	Stadium	Capacity
Aylestone Park	Leicester	Saffron Lane	1,128
Barrow Town	Barrow upon Soar	Barrow Road	
Birstall United	Birstall	Meadow Lane	
Blackstones	Stamford	Lincoln Road	1,000
Blidworth Welfare	Blidworth	Welfare Ground	
Bourne Town	Bourne	Abbey Lawn	2,000
Clifton All Whites	Nottingham (Clifton)	Green Lane	
Clipstone	Clipstone	Lido Ground	
Dunkirk	Nottingham (Dunkirk)	Lenton Lane	
Gedling Miners Welfare	Gedling	Plains Road	
Grantham Town academy	Grantham	South Kesteven Sports Stadium	7,500
Harrowby United	Grantham	Dickens Road	
Holwell Sports	Asfordby Hill	Welby Road	1,000
Hucknall Town	Hucknall	Watnall Road / RM Stadium	
Kirby Muxloe	Kirby Muxloe	Ratby Lane	3,000
Newark Town	Newark-on-Trent	YMCA Sports Village	
Radford	Nottingham (Radford)	Selhurst Street	
Rainworth Miners Welfare	Rainworth	Welfare Ground	
Saffron Dynamo	Cosby	Cambridge Road	
Southwell City	Southwell	Centenary Ground, Brinkley	
St Andrews	Leicester	Canal Street	1,000
West Bridgford	West Bridgford	Regatta Way	

== League Cup ==
2022–23 United Counties League Cup
Tournament details
- Country: England
- Teams: 60

Final positions
- Champions: Anstey Nomads (1st title)
- Runners-up: Deeping Rangers

Quarter-finals

21 February 2023	Kirby Muxloe (D1)	0–2	Anstey Nomads (PN)	Kirby Muxloe
19:45		Report	Armeni 56'; Hollis 76'	Stadium: Ratby Lane; Attendance: 206; Referee: Gary Lord

21 February 2023	Godmanchester Rovers (PS)	1–1 (a.e.t.) (2–3 p)	March Town United (PS)	Godmanchester
19:45	Ruddy	Report	Friend 6'	Stadium: Bearscroft Lane; Attendance: 75; Referee: Chris Walton

22 February 2023	Sleaford Town (PN)	3–2	Newark and Sherwood United (PN)	Sleaford
19:45	Smith 1'; Fenton 16'; Rushen 20'	Report	Blake 48'; Gardner 53'	Stadium: Boston Road; Attendance: 230; Referee: James Astley

25 February 2023	Deeping Rangers (PN)	1–1 (a.e.t.) (5–4 p)	Cogenhoe United (PS)	Market Deeping
15:00	Sennett 59'	Report	Obeng 86'	Stadium: Haydon Whitham Stadium; Attendance: 134; Referee: Aimee Keir

Semi-finals

18 April 2023	Deeping Rangers (PN)	2–2 (a.e.t.) (5–4 p)	March Town United (PS)	Market Deeping
19:45	Bird 6'; Sparrow 61'	Report	Vaz 42'; Saunders 90'	Stadium: Haydon Whitham Stadium; Attendance: 232; Referee: Mehul Karia

26 April 2023	Sleaford Town (PN)	1–3	Anstey Nomads (PN)	Sleaford
19:45	Wright 63'; Griffiths (red card) 90'	Report	Robinson 45+1'; Clarke 60'; Brennan 83'	Stadium: Boston Road; Attendance: 178; Referee: Nick Elliott

Final

1 May 2023	Anstey Nomads (PN)	3–0	Deeping Rangers (PN)	Stamford
15:00	Gibbens 14'; Korpal 19'; Armeni 86'	Report		Stadium: Blackstone Sports and Social Club; Attendance: 450; Referee: Harry Price
