= Southwell City F.C. =

Association football club in England

Coordinates: 53°3′55.71″N 0°55′18.58″W

Southwell City
- Full name: Southwell City Football Club
- Nickname: The Zebras
- Founded: 1893; 133 years ago (traditional); 1955; 71 years ago (formal)
- Ground: Centenary Sports Ground; Brinkley, Nottinghamshire
- Chairman: John Cunningham
- Manager: Jonny Upton
- League: United Counties League Division One
- 2025–26: United Counties League Division One, 13th of 23
- Website: southwellcity.com
| Home colours | Away colours |

Southwell City Football Club is a football club based in Brinkley, near Southwell, Nottinghamshire, England. The club traces its foundation to 1893 with the establishment of Southwell Greenhalgh's, a team which changed their name to Southwell City the following year. This side folded in 1905 before a new club adopted the name in 1908 and competed until the First World War. A third incarnation lasted from 1921 until dissolving in 1925. The present iteration of Southwell City was founded in 1955, playing in local amateur divisions before joining the nationwide league system in 2004. City currently compete in the United Counties League Division One.

City's first team have played their home matches at the Centenary Sports Ground since 2021. Prior to its promotion to the United Counties League after the 2021–22 season, the club competed in the Nottinghamshire Senior League Premier Division and two divisions of the Central Midlands Football League. Since their most recent reformation, City have won six league titles and two knockout trophies, and have twice been Nottinghamshire Senior Cup finalists (1988–89, 2001–02). City made their national tournament debut in 2023–24 when they first entered the FA Vase. The team are nicknamed "The Zebras" owing to the club's traditional colours of black and white.

== History ==
=== First clubs, 1893–1925 ===
==== Foundations and pre-First World War, 1893–1914 ====
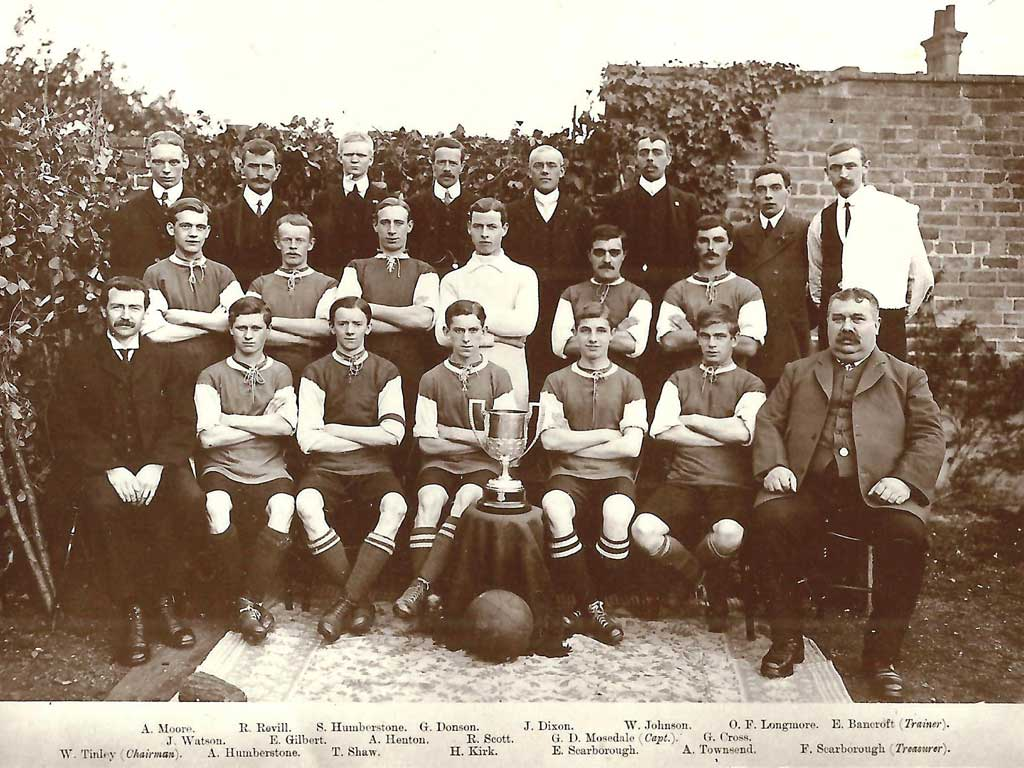
Southwell City won the Newark and District League Challenge Cup in 1910–11.

The club traces its foundation to 1893. That year, an amateur team named Southwell Greenhalgh's began playing friendly matches against local opposition. (Note: This team is not to be confused with Greenhalgh's, a contemporaneous side from Mansfield who in the 1893–94 season played in the Midland Football League. Greenhalgh's comprised workers from an eponymous textile company, a significant 19th-century employer in North Nottinghamshire that at its peak had a workforce of over 500.) By January 1894, Greenhalgh's had played 15 matches, winning 12, losing two and drawing one. In November, the Nottinghamshire Football Association (FA) approved an application from the club to change its name to Southwell City. (Note: Southwell itself is not a city but a market town. A later club history attributes the choice of the name Southwell City to recognition of Southwell Minster being designated a cathedral in 1884. However, although until 1889 in England city status was generally associated with towns that had Anglican cathedrals, the presence of a cathedral did not automatically confer city status.) In the 1895–96 season, City made their league debut in the Newark and District Amateur Football League, finishing as runners-up. The club rejoined the Newark and District League when, following a five-season hiatus, it resumed in 1901–02. The club had continued to play friendlies in the interim. City again finished as league runners-up in 1902–03 before becoming champions in 1903–04. In 1905, City ceased to exist independently after merging with other local teams to form a new club called Southwell. (Note: This Southwell club competed in the Newark and District Amateur Football League for one full season before withdrawing from the league by the October of 1906–07.)

Having made their debut in the Newark and District League in 1907–08, another side, Southwell Juniors, successfully applied to the Nottinghamshire FA to adopt the Southwell City name ahead of 1908–09. The reformed City finished as league runners-up in 1909–10 before winning the Newark and District League Challenge Cup the following season, defeating Wakes and Lambs 6–2 in the final. From 1911–12, City attracted several players from the 4th Battalion of the Sherwood Foresters. Among them was forward Bertie Bowler, who left the side to sign as a professional with Plymouth Argyle. The Newark and District League was reorganised into two divisions for 1912–13, with City competing in the top tier, Division One, until the end of 1913–14, after which the league reverted to a single-division format. The team was unable to resume play the following season due to the outbreak of the First World War, with the majority of the squad joining the British Army.

==== Post-war and cessation, 1914–1925 ====
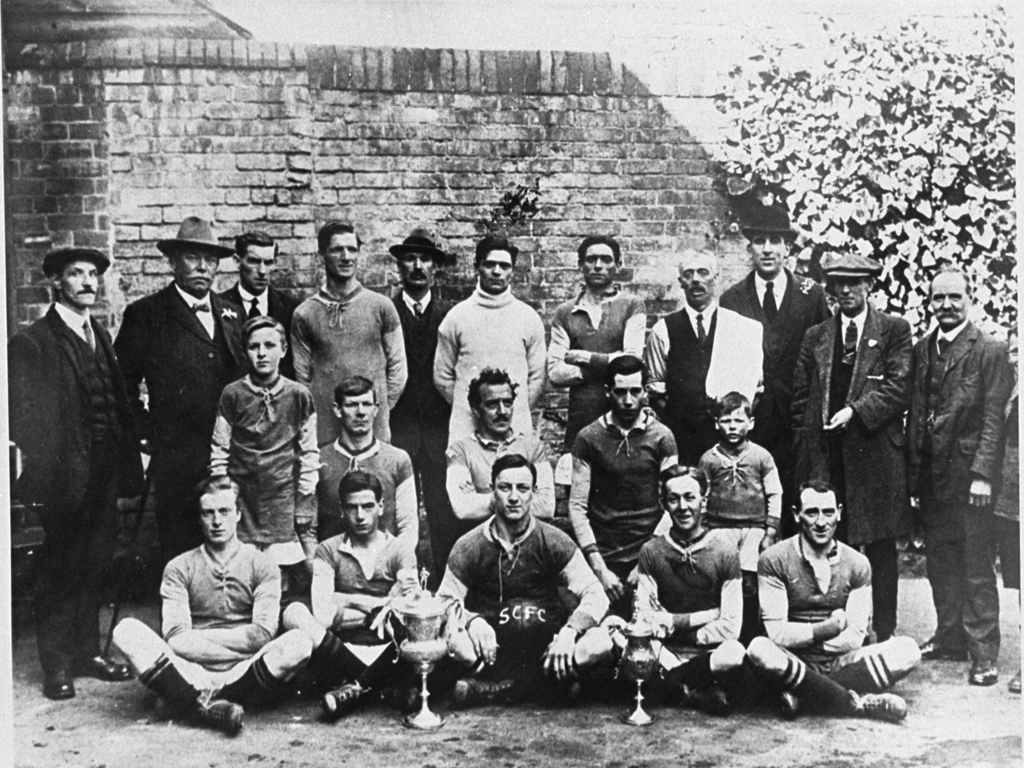
City won two cup competitions in the North Notts League in 1922–23.

Several City players past and present were killed during the war, with almost half of the 1910–11 team losing their lives. Although the pre-war club still existed as of May 1917, it did not rejoin the Newark and District League when the competition resumed in 1919–20. Instead, another club, Southwell Federation, represented the town in the league during that season and again in 1920–21. Under new ownership and "in a fairly strong financial position", Federation adopted the Southwell City name ahead of its 1921–22 campaign in the league's topmost Division One, after the league was once again split into two sections. City transferred to Division Two (North) of the amateur North Notts Football League for 1922–23, and that season won both the division's League Cup with a 5–3 victory over Langwith Athletic Reserves and the league's overall Senior Cup with a 2–0 win against Clipstone, the latter final being played at Field Mill. The club was promoted to Division One (North) for 1923–24, and the following season was admitted to the newly unified Division One after the topmost North and South sections were abolished. However, City did not complete the 1924–25 season and played their final league fixture in or before April.

=== Current club, 1955–present ===
==== Revival and consolidation, 1955–1995 ====
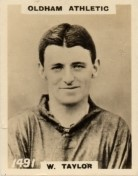
Bill Taylor (pictured in 1922) coached City upon the team's revival in 1955–56.

A splinter of amateur club Southwell St Mary's revived the Southwell City name for 1955–56, joining Division Two of the Newark and District League under trainer Bill Taylor. City scored 153 goals in their first campaign, finishing as runners-up in the league and losing 4–1 to British Railways in the final of the division's League Cup. Promoted, City entered the topmost Division One for the following season, winning the title in 1957–58 before transferring to Division Two of the Notts Football Alliance for 1958–59, the third tier of that competition. City were beaten finalists in the division's League Cup in both that season and in 1959–60, losing 1–0 to Bulwell Forest Villa and to Chandos Old Boys respectively. However, after the latter campaign, they were promoted to Division One as champions, having scored 100 goals by March. During 1960–61, the team recorded their biggest-ever win, beating Raleigh Athletic Reserves 11–0, with forward Joe Boucher scoring seven. In June 1967, the club reported that its expenditure of £300 on kit, transport and ground improvements had resulted in "a big drop in revenue"; however, by May 1968, it announced a profit of just over £10. (Note: £300 in 1967 and £10 in 1968 equated approximately to £7,340 and £234, respectively, in 2024; these figures are calculated from the increase in Retail Price Index percentage between the two years.) City spent 11 seasons in Division One of the Notts Alliance before becoming champions in 1970–71, thereby securing promotion to the topmost Senior Division.

City's stint in the Senior Division was hampered by the departure of experienced forwards Boucher to Clipstone Welfare in 1974–75 (although he returned the following season) and Alan Markham to Lowdham United in 1976–77. The club narrowly avoided relegation after the latter campaign before being demoted in 1977–78 following a season in which City could "do little right" according to the Nottingham Evening Post. The club spent the next four seasons in Division One of the Notts Alliance before being promoted as champions back to the Senior Division in 1981–82. The following season, full-back Colin Barrett joined the squad and took on the role of player-manager in 1983–84 before departing in January. Barrett had returned to the club's coaching staff by December 1985 and later managed City to the final of the Nottinghamshire Senior Cup in 1988–89, a match in which they were beaten 3–0 by Eastwood Town. City were relegated to Division One at the end of 1990–91 after collecting only seven points from 20 matches by February. They secured mid-table finishes in the next two campaigns before finishing fourth in a 16-team division in 1993–94. The 1994–95 season proved more successful as City were promoted back to the Senior Division as runners-up and also reached the final of the Nottinghamshire Intermediate Cup, losing 2–1 to Welbeck Colliery Welfare.

==== Modern era and league progression, 1995–present ====
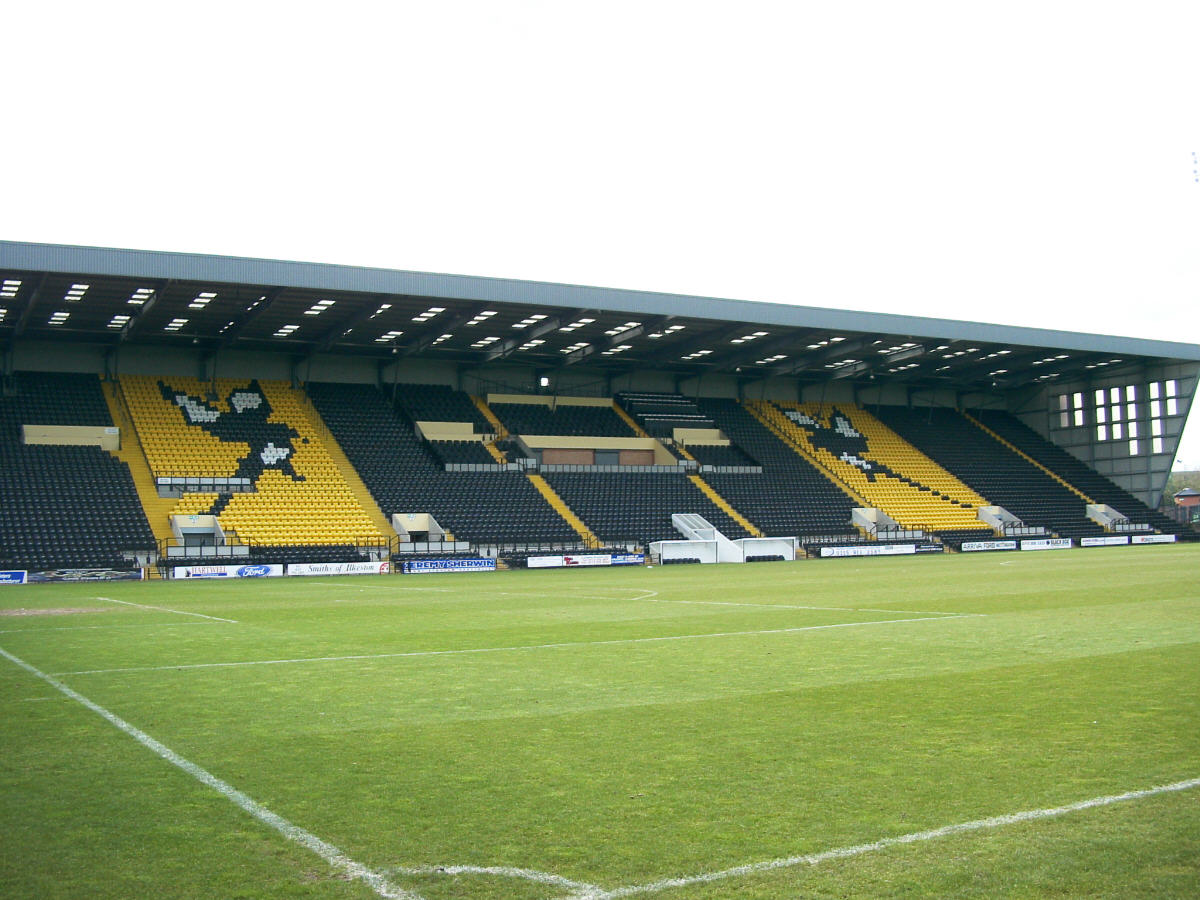
City lost the 2001–02 Nottinghamshire Senior Cup final at Meadow Lane (pictured in 2003).

City's first season returning to the Senior Division saw the club struggle against relegation before the appointment of manager John Campbell ahead of 1996–97. Under Campbell, City achieved a runners-up finish in 1998–99, their highest-ever placing in the Notts Alliance. The side built on this progress by securing the league title in 2000–01, while the following season they won the Notts Alliance Senior Cup and again reached the final of the Nottinghamshire Senior Cup, losing 1–0 to Gedling Town at Meadow Lane. During the latter campaign, the Central Midlands Football League (CML) rejected the club's application for membership due to its unenclosed ground. City later transferred to the CML Premier Division for 2003–04 and, after scoring 103 goals, were promoted at the first attempt as runners-up to the league's top tier, the Supreme Division, then at the eleventh level of the English football league system. (Note: During City's membership of the Central Midlands Football League, its Premier Division was technically separate from the English football league system, although it fed sequentially into its topmost Supreme Division, which, owing to the creation of the Conference North at level six, sat at level 11 (level seven of the National League System) from 2004–05.) Following a season of consolidation, Campbell retired, bringing an end to a tenure described by the club as "the most successful period in its history". City enjoyed a positive 2005–06 and anticipated challenging for the league title the following campaign. However, reliance on reserve players to cover first-team absences contributed to the club finishing eighth in a 20-team division. In 2007–08, City were beaten finalists in the CML Floodlit Cup, losing 3–1 on penalties to Holbrook Miners Welfare following a 1–1 draw after extra time.

The CML was reorganised for 2011–12, with the Supreme and Premier Divisions merged and the league split into North and South sections at level 11 of the English football pyramid. The club joined the CML South Division and, the following season, reached the regional final of the CML Floodlit Cup, losing 2–1 to Newark Town. City had several managers in the early-to-mid 2010s, with the period between November 2014 and January 2016 described by the club as a time of "turmoil" with "the squad in disarray", culminating in a last-placed league finish in 2015–16. In 2017–18, City transferred to the Nottinghamshire Senior League's (NSL) topmost Premier Division, also at level 11, to reduce travel and play teams of a more comparable ability. Previous joint-manager Jonny Upton took sole charge in the January of that season, leading City to claim the NSL Senior Cup the following campaign with a 6–1 win over Stapleford Town in the final. After both the 2019–20 and 2020–21 NSL campaigns were started and subsequently abandoned due to the COVID-19 pandemic, City won the league in 2021–22, a season in which the team staged a run of 16 consecutive victories in competitive matches. This earned the club promotion to the United Counties League (UCL) Division One at level ten for 2022–23. Competing at this level allowed City to debut in the FA Vase in 2023–24; the team lost 4–2 to Eastwood Community in the second qualifying round. City set a club record in the 2026–27 Vase when they reached the second round proper, losing 3–2 on penalties to Rugby Town following a 1–1 draw after regular time.

=== Season-by-season record since 2003–04 ===
| Season | Division | Level | Position | FA Vase | Post-season notes |
|---|---|---|---|---|---|
| 2003–04 | Central Midlands Football League Premier Division | - | 2nd/19 | - | Promoted as runners-up to Central Midlands Football League Supreme Division at level 11 |
| 2004–05 | Central Midlands Football League Supreme Division | 11 | 14th/22 | - | |
| 2005–06 | Central Midlands Football League Supreme Division | 11 | 4th/21 | - | |
| 2006–07 | Central Midlands Football League Supreme Division | 11 | 8th/20 | - | |
| 2007–08 | Central Midlands Football League Supreme Division | 11 | 7th/20 | - | |
| 2008–09 | Central Midlands Football League Supreme Division | 11 | 12th/18 | - | |
| 2009–10 | Central Midlands Football League Supreme Division | 11 | 13th/18 | - | |
| 2010–11 | Central Midlands Football League Supreme Division | 11 | 12th/18 | - | League reorganised; entered Central Midlands Football League South Division at level 11 |
| 2011–12 | Central Midlands Football League South Division | 11 | 8th/16 | - | |
| 2012–13 | Central Midlands Football League South Division | 11 | 10th/16 | - | |
| 2013–14 | Central Midlands Football League South Division | 11 | 6th/17 | - | |
| 2014–15 | Central Midlands Football League South Division | 11 | 14th/15 | - | |
| 2015–16 | Central Midlands Football League South Division | 11 | 18th/18 | - | |
| 2016–17 | Central Midlands Football League South Division | 11 | 10th/15 | - | Transferred to Nottinghamshire Senior League Premier Division at level 11 |
| 2017–18 | Nottinghamshire Senior League Premier Division | 11 | 5th/18 | - | |
| 2018–19 | Nottinghamshire Senior League Premier Division | 11 | 3rd/18 | - | |
| 2019–20 | Nottinghamshire Senior League Premier Division | 11 | N/A | - | Season abandoned due to COVID-19 |
| 2020–21 | Nottinghamshire Senior League Premier Division | 11 | N/A | - | Season abandoned due to COVID-19 |
| 2021–22 | Nottinghamshire Senior League Premier Division | 11 | 1st/16 | - | Promoted as champions to United Counties League Division One at level ten |
| 2022–23 | United Counties League Division One | 10 | 14th/21 | - | |
| 2023–24 | United Counties League Division One | 10 | 16th/21 | 2QR | |
| 2024–25 | United Counties League Division One | 10 | 12th/19 | 2QR | |
| 2025–26 | United Counties League Division One | 10 | 13th/23 | 2QR | |

== Club identity ==
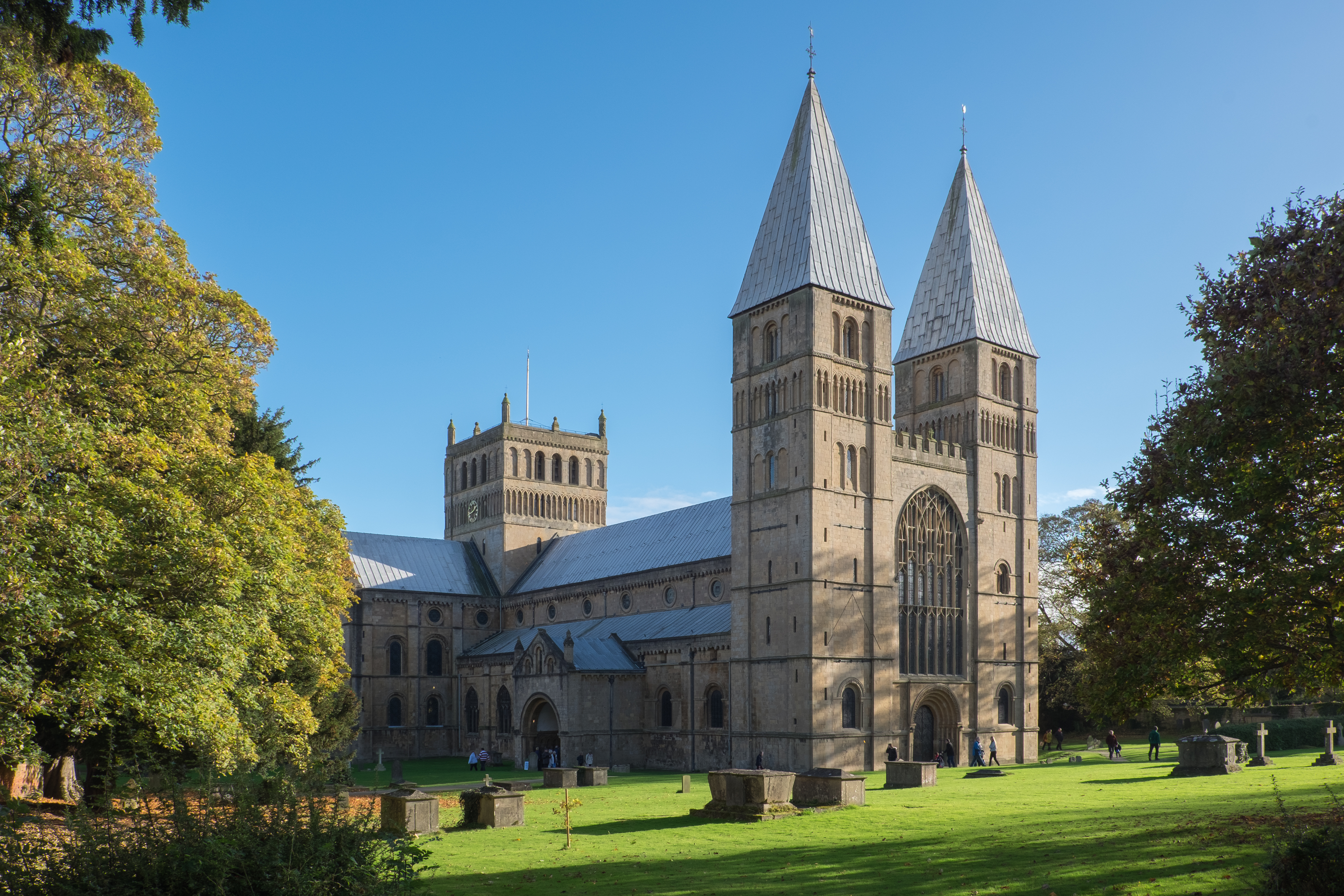
City were nicknamed the "Minster Men" after Southwell Minster (pictured in 2016).

City traditionally play in a home kit of black and white. From at least 1956–57, the kit consisted of white shirts, black shorts and black-and-white hooped socks. By 1970–71, the side had adopted black-and-white striped shirts, paired with black shorts and white socks. Variations of these colours have been used ever since. Earlier incarnations of the team played in different colours; local newspapers referred to the side as "the Reds" during 1894–95 and 1895–96, while the City team of 1924–25 were described as "the Blues". City's current badge comprises a black-and-white striped shield with one tudor rose on each side and the club name, a variation of which has been used since at least 1983–84. Previously, from at least 1956–57, the badge was a simple shield design divided into three sections, featuring the letters "S" and "C" for Southwell City. This crest had disappeared from home kits by 1959–60.

City's current nickname is "the Zebras", reflecting the colours of their home shirts. The club's earliest claimed forerunner, Southwell Greenhalgh's, were known as "the Halgh's", while successive sides under the Southwell City name have at various times been referred to in the local press as the "Cits", "Citizens", and "Minster Men", the latter a reference to Southwell Minster. Some of the club's principal local rivals since its most recent reformation have been Newark and Sherwood United, Hucknall Town, Blidworth Welfare, and Newark Town. Earlier iterations of the team also maintained several local rivalries in the late 19th and early 20th-centuries, namely with other amateur sides in Newark-on-Trent, and in Southwell itself.

== Grounds ==
=== First clubs ===
The early City teams were itinerant, playing at various grounds around Southwell. These included the Station Ground (1895–96), the Racecourse Ground (1896–97), the Town-End Ground (1900–01), the City Ground (1900–01 and 1901–02), Pentelow's Field (1909–10 and 1910–11), the Nottingham Road Ground (1913–14) and the Moor Lane Ground (1913–14). The most consistent venue was Lowe's Wong on Halam Road, which hosted City teams in 1895–96 and 1896–97, 1912–13, and from 1921–22 until the final season in 1924–25. When it was auctioned in June 1877, Lowe's Wong was described in the Nottingham Journal as a "field of mowing grass … said to contain 9 acres". Football was being played there as early as March 1881. In January 1922, the pitch was described by the Newark Advertiser as a "mud-heap" that had "always been regarded as a heavy ground".

=== Current club ===
==== War Memorial Recreation Ground ====
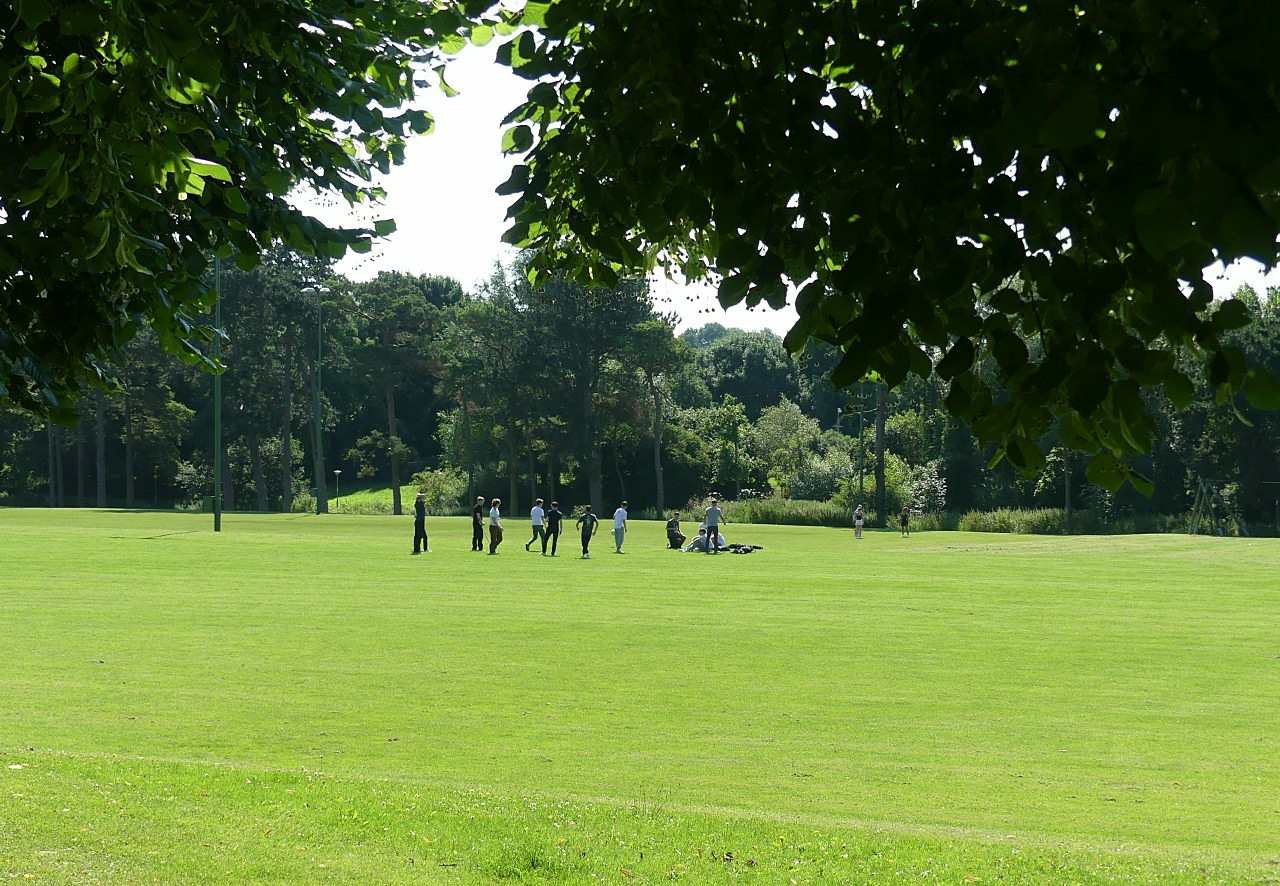
From 1955 to 2021, City's first team played at the War Memorial Recreation Ground (pictured in 2024).

After being revived in 1955, City played at the War Memorial Recreation Ground in Southwell, which opened as a sporting venue in May 1948. By September 1957, the club had obtained a pavilion and improved drainage for its pitch. However, this pitch was lost by September 1959, forcing the team to relocate to a new one on Nottingham Road. City had returned to the Recreation Ground by June 1960, and a new wooden pavilion was constructed by May 1965 at a cost of £600. The following March, Stuart Goodwin donated £200 towards an extension to this building, which provided a dressing room and showers. (Note: £600 in 1965 and £200 in 1966 equated approximately to £15,700 and £5,020, respectively, in 2024; these figures are calculated from the increase in Retail Price Index percentage between the two years.)

In March 1987, City applied for planning permission to build a more spacious pavilion to replace the existing structure. The wooden pavilion was demolished and replaced in October 1992 by a brick and tile building costing £50,000, which featured four changing rooms, a referee's room, showers, a kitchen, an office and a bar. (Note: £50,000 in 1992 equated approximately to £140,000 in 2024; this figure is calculated from the increase in Retail Price Index percentage between the two years.) Floodlights were installed by October 2001, and, to meet the CML's ground requirements ahead of 2004–05, the club constructed additional hardstanding with retractable covering. As of 2025–26, the ground is still used by the club to host junior football.

==== Centenary Sports Ground ====
The club has used the Centenary Sports Ground in Brinkley since at least January 1999. The ground, opened in August 1996, was named to mark the 100th anniversary of the creation of Southwell Parish Council. It initially served as a base for City's reserve and youth teams. In November 2017, the club announced its intention to move all senior football there, later citing their inability to charge spectators or sufficiently improve the War Memorial Recreation Ground as it is situated on public land.

City intended to make their first-team debut at the ground in 2020–21 and, by February 2020, had submitted a planning application for a new pitch, a stand for spectators and a 20-foot ball-stop fence. The plans also included an extension to the existing clubhouse to provide changing rooms with toilets and showers, referees' rooms, a bar and a turnstile. All these facilities were required by The Football Association for clubs wishing to compete at level ten of the English football pyramid (level six of the National League System). Dugouts, a covered standing area for spectators and floodlights were also promised by the club as part of a future second phase of development.

Although the proposals were approved by Newark and Sherwood District Council in May 2020 – and the club secured support from the Football Stadia Improvement Fund the following month – development was delayed by the spread of the COVID-19 pandemic in England. In November 2020, Nottinghamshire County Council awarded £6,155 towards upgrading the clubhouse, and, in November 2021, City's first team played their first match at the ground. During 2022–23, two new stands, a path and floodlights were installed. In June 2025, the club submitted a £1.7 million funding application to the District Council for a new 3G all-weather pitch with the aim of it being ready for the start of 2026–27.

== Honours ==
| Honour | Season(s) |
|---|---|
| Newark and District Amateur Football League; Champions | 1903–04 |
| Newark and District Amateur Football League; Challenge Cup winners | 1910–11 |
| North Notts Football League; Division Two League Cup winners | 1922–23 |
| North Notts Football League; Senior Cup winners | 1922–23 |
| Newark and District Amateur Football League; Division One champions | 1957–58 |
| Notts Football Alliance; Division Two champions | 1959–60 |
| Notts Football Alliance; Division One champions | 1970–71, 1981–82 |
| Notts Football Alliance; Senior Division champions | 2000–01 |
| Notts Football Alliance; Senior Cup winners | 2001–02 |
| Nottinghamshire Senior League; Senior Cup winners | 2018–19 |
| Nottinghamshire Senior League; Premier Division champions | 2021–22 |

== National tournament records ==
| Record | Season(s) |
|---|---|
| FA Vase; Second round | 2026–27 |
