= 2014–15 East Midlands Counties Football League =

The 2014–15 East Midlands Counties Football League season was the 7th in the history of East Midlands Counties Football League, a football competition in England.

== League ==
East Midlands Counties Football League
- Season: 2014–15
- Champions: Bardon Hill
- Promoted: Bardon Hill
- Matches: 380
- Goals: 1,499 (3.94 per match)
- Top goalscorer: 34 goals Steven Hart Bardon Hill
- Biggest home win: Ellistown & Ibstock United 9–0 Greenwood Meadows (24 January 2015)
- Biggest away win: Aylestone Park 0–8 Blaby & Whetstone Athletic (14 February 2015)
- Highest scoring: Ashby Ivanhoe 9-1 Greenwood Meadows (10 January 2015); Blaby & Whetstone Athletic 8-2 Aylestone Park (6 December 2014)
- Longest winning run: 10 matches Radford
- Longest unbeaten run: 18 matches Radford
- Longest losing run: 13 matches Graham Street Prims
- Highest attendance: 320; Bardon Hill 6-1 Ellistown & Ibstock United (1 May 2015)
- Lowest attendance: 8 Blaby & Whetstone Athletic 1-0 Holbrook Sports (29 November 2014)
- Average attendance: 54

The league featured 17 clubs from the previous season, along with three new clubs:

- Ashby Ivanhoe, promoted from the Leicestershire Senior League
- Kimberley Miners Welfare, promoted from the Nottinghamshire Senior League
- South Normanton Athletic, promoted from the Central Midlands Football League

=== League table ===
Pos	Team	Pld	W	D	L	GF	GA	GD	Pts	Promotion or relegation
1	Bardon Hill	38	26	4	8	110	45	+65	82	Promoted to the Midland Football League
2	St Andrews	38	26	4	8	101	48	+53	82	
3	Radford	38	22	8	8	95	48	+47	74	
4	Ellistown & Ibstock United	38	22	7	9	102	51	+51	73	
5	Blaby & Whetstone Athletic	38	21	7	10	80	50	+30	70	
6	Ashby Ivanhoe	38	20	6	12	72	52	+20	66	
7	South Normanton Athletic	38	19	8	11	89	61	+28	65	
8	Holwell Sports	38	17	8	13	71	71	0	59	
9	Barrow Town	38	16	10	12	73	70	+3	58	
10	Arnold Town	38	18	4	16	72	74	−2	58	
11	Holbrook Sports	38	15	8	15	84	76	+8	53	
12	Gedling Miners Welfare	38	16	5	17	65	72	−7	53	
13	Kimberley Miners Welfare	38	13	10	15	74	71	+3	49	
14	Anstey Nomads	38	14	7	17	70	75	−5	49	
15	Stapenhill	38	12	7	19	56	76	−20	43	
16	Borrowash Victoria	38	13	3	22	70	105	−35	42	
17	Radcliffe Olympic	38	12	5	21	63	82	−19	38 (Note: Radcliffe Olympic were deducted 3 points for a fielding an illegible player.)	
18	Graham Street Prims	38	10	3	25	57	93	−36	33	
19	Aylestone Park	38	4	5	29	53	135	−82	16 (Note: Aylestone Park were deducted 1 point for fielding an illegible player.)	
20	Greenwood Meadows	38	3	3	32	42	144	−102	12	

Source: fchd
Rules for classification: 1) points; 2) goal difference; 3) number of goals scored.
