= Tommy Asher =

English footballer

Personal information
- Full name: Thomas Asher
- Date of birth: 21 December 1936
- Place of birth: Dunscroft, Yorkshire, England
- Date of death: 11 March 2017 (aged 80)
- Position: Inside forward

Youth career
- Doncaster Schoolboys
- Wolverhampton Wanderers

Senior career*
Years	Team	Apps	(Gls)
1954–1959	Notts County	31	(4)
1959–1960	Peterborough United	40	(30)
1959–1960	Peterborough United	2	(0)
1960– 1962	Ilkeston Town	30	(8)
1963–1964	Ransome & Marles		
1964–1966	Grantham Town		
1966–1967	Keyworth United		
Total		103	(42)

International career
	England Schoolboys	3	
- * Club domestic league appearances and goals

Thomas Asher (21 December 1936 – 11 March 2017) was an English footballer who played in the Football League for Notts County. He also played for Peterborough United, Ilkeston Town, Ransome & Marles, Grantham Town, Eastwood Town, and Keyworth United. Tommy represented England Schoolboys during his youth and played alongside Manchester United's Duncan Edwards.

== Early life ==
Asher was born on 21 December 1936 and was raised in Dunscroft, Yorkshire.

== Youth career ==
=== Doncaster Schoolboys ===
As a young boy, Asher rose to prominence thanks to his performances with Doncaster Schoolboys. After impressing the England coaches with his ability, he was called up to play for his country at Schoolboy level. He went on to play three times at this level.

=== Wolverhampton Wanderers ===
When Asher was in his mid-teens, he was approached by top clubs. He was contemplating Manchester United and Wolverhampton Wanderers. At this time, Sir Matt Busby visited Asher's home in Dunscroft to influence his choice. At the time, Wolves were the more successful team. This managed to turn Asher's head. He signed for the club's youth team. He was a key figure in the 1954 team that reached the final of the FA Youth Cup against Manchester United. However, he could not play due to an injury. He scored twice in the cup run against Derby County and Spalding United. He was instrumental in helping the Wolves youth team win the Birmingham and District League title in the same season.

== Club career ==
=== Notts County ===
In 1954, Asher joined Notts County and played there for five years. In that time, he made 31 first-team appearances and scored 4 goals. The club's coaches urged Asher to play in the reserve team before his debut to build his confidence and ability. He spent three seasons with the reserves before making his senior debut in a home game against Swansea Town (as they were then) in September 1957. Notts were beaten 4–2 but gained revenge in the return fixture a week later, winning 3–1, with Tommy scoring the first of his four goals for the Magpies. He remained a squad player until 1959 when he left the Magpies to join Peterborough United.

=== Peterborough United ===
Asher dropped out of League football and moved to non-League club Peterborough United in 1959. At the time, they competed in the Midland League. Due to the sheer brilliance of rival inside forward Dennis Emery, Asher struggled to forge a first-team position, so they competed frequently for the reserves. He was described as "a clever little player who certainly knew how to score," he showed that during his only season for the Posh when he scored 30 goals. He was a prolific goal scorer for the reserves and even scored 4 goals in one match against Harwich & Parkeston on 10 October 1959 in the Eastern Counties League.

He made two first-team appearances for the Posh, the first a 2–1 loss against Ashington. Asher kept his place for the next Posh game, away at Spennymoor Town, which Posh won 3–1. However, it proved to be his final first-team game for the club as he left at the end of the season to join Ilkeston Town.

=== Ilkeston Town ===
After spending just one season at the Posh, he returned to Nottinghamshire to join Ilkeston Town in the Central Alliance League in 1960. He joined up with the squad just before the start of the 1960/61 season and scored the winning goal on his debut in an away win against Nottingham Forest. His footballing artistry was seen firsthand but not frequently enough, which resulted in his release in 1961. His final appearance was against Sutton Town on 14 October 1961. Asher went on to appear for Ransome & Marles, Grantham Town and Eastwood Town before playing for his final full-time club, Keyworth United, in 1966.

== Personal life ==
In 1957, at the age of 21, he married Glennis May Asher. They had three children together: Neil, Tracey and Sally. Their children are Tom, Poppy, Milly, Charlotte, Alex, Jack and Katie. Towards the end of his life, he became a great-grandad to Kieran and Evie-May.

== Death ==
Tommy Asher died at 80 on 11 March 2017 in his home in Gotham, Nottinghamshire.
