= Miners Welfare =

The term Miners Welfare appears in the name of several association football clubs:

== England ==
- Blackwell Miners Welfare F.C.
- Calverton Miners Welfare F.C.
- Gedling Miners Welfare F.C.
- Hemsworth Miners Welfare F.C.
- Holbrook Miners Welfare F.C.
- Nostell Miners Welfare F.C.
- Rainworth Miners Welfare F.C.
- Staveley Miners Welfare F.C.

== Scotland ==
- Lochore Miners Welfare F.C.
