= Collingham F.C. =

Collingham F.C. may refer to:

- Collingham F.C. (Nottinghamshire)
- Collingham F.C. (West Yorkshire)
