= Keyworth United F.C. =

Association football club in England

Keyworth United
- Full name: Keyworth United Community Football Club
- Nickname: The Windmills
- Founded: 1876
- Ground: Platt Lane
- Chairman: Ian Thompson
- Manager: Ross Frame and Damien Hurst
- League: Nottinghamshire Senior League Premier Division
- 2024–25: Nottinghamshire Senior League Premier Division, 5th of 17

Keyworth United Community Football Club is an English football club based in Keyworth, near Nottingham, Nottinghamshire. The club plays in the Nottinghamshire Senior League Premier Division. The club is a FA Charter Standard Club affiliated to the Nottinghamshire County Football Association.

== History ==
They played in the FA Vase in the 1980s. On 24 July 1988, Brian Clough brought Nottingham Forest F.C. for a pre-season friendly down to face Keyworth United F.C. at the Platt Lane ground, the match resulted in a 7–0 victory to Nottingham Forest in front of an estimated crowd of over 2000 people in attendance. Visiting manager, Brian Clough spent almost the entire afternoon signing autographs and conversing with the spectators. At the time of this game Nottingham Forest F.C. were third in Division 1 (Football League First Division) at the time and went on to be the seasons League Cup winning team and finish 3rd yet again at the end of the season.

== Name changes ==
Name changes over the years:

- from 1876 to 1913 Keyworth Football Club

References exist, suggesting the club may have been known as KEYWORTH OLYMPIC FC and KEYWORTH TOWN FC during 1902 however these may have been journalistic or typographical errors.

Through the 1903/04 and 1904/05 seasons whilst participating in the Notts Junior League, references were made to the club as KEYWORTH JUNIORS FC even though the players were not ‘Junior’ in age.

- from 1913 to 1914 Keyworth & Plumtree United Football Club

Known by this title for one season only prior to the 1st World War

- from 1919 to 1936 Keyworth United Football Club
- from 1936 to 1947 Normanton & Keyworth Football Club

Known by this title from the commencement of the 1936/37 season until after the 2nd World War and a decision taken at the Annual General Meeting of the club on 16 June 1947

- from 1947 to 20?? Keyworth United Football Club
- from 20?? to Present Keyworth United Community Football Club
