= John Ramshaw =

English football manager

Personal information
- Date of birth: 11 March 1953 (age 73)
- Place of birth: Newcastle, England

Senior career*
Years	Team	Apps	(Gls)
1983–1984	Notts County		
1995–1995	Shepshed Charterhouse		
1995	Hucknall Town	0	(0)

Managerial career
- 1978-1983: Notts County (youth coach)
- 1983–1984: Shepshed Charterhouse (player-coach)
- 1986–1989: Oakham United
- 1989–1993: Sutton Town
- 1993–1995: Shepshed Dynamo (assistant)
- 1995–2001: Hucknall Town
- 2001–2002: Eastwood Town (assistant)
- 2002–2003: Leek Town
- 2003–2004: Kidsgrove Athletic
- 2006–2007: Hednesford Town (assistant)
- 2007-2008: Lincoln United
- 2008–2010: Eastwood Town (assistant)
- 2011: Shepshed Dynamo
- 2011–2012: Eastwood Town
- 2012–2014: Mansfield Town (Academy Director)
- 2015: Torquay United (assistant)
- 2018–2019: Hinckley AFC
- 2019-2022: Kettering Town (assistant)
- 2022: Boston United (assistant)
- 2023-2024: Loughborough (assistant)
- 2024: Shepshed Dynamo (assistant)
- * Club domestic league appearances and goals

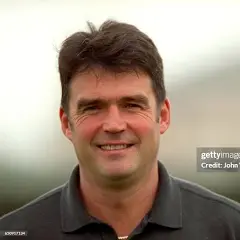

John Ramshaw is a football coach and manager who most recently served as the interim manager of Shepshed Dynamo F.C. in the Midlands division of the Northern Premier League.

== Career ==
Ramshaw began his career at Notts County from 1978 until 1983. He gained his English FA Full Licence (UEFA A Licence equivalent) in 1981.

In 1984 Ramshaw joined Shepshed Charterhouse as player-coach in the Southern League. Placed in the bottom three when he joined them, Shepshed finished in fifth place, narrowly missing out on promotion to the Football Conference.

The following year Ramshaw returned to the professional game with Nottingham Forest, looking after their Associate Schoolboy programme for two years.

He returned to non-League management with Oakham United in the Central Midlands Football League in 1986, signing a young Dion Dublin (before facilitating his move to Norwich City) and leading the club to the Central Midlands Football League Cup semi-finals.

In 1989 Ramshaw became the manager of Sutton Town, then competing in the Northern Counties East League. The club was runners-up in the Northern Counties East league and League Cup semi-finalists in the three years Ramshaw was with the Snipes.

In 1994, he became the first team coach at the newly renamed Shepshed Dynamo in the Midland Football Alliance.

In March 1995, he became manager of Hucknall Town. In his seven seasons there, the club won the Northern Counties East League and were runners-up in the Northern Premier League First Division the following season. They won the Northern Counties East League Cup two years in succession and the Northern Counties East Football League Presidents Cup. They won the Notts Senior Cup three times. They were also runners-up once, losing to Arnold Town. They reached the semifinals of the Northern Premier League Challenge Cup. He also made one appearance on the substitutes bench.

Ramshaw became assistant manager of Eastwood Town in November 2001. After that, Ramshaw joined Leek Town of the Northern Premier League Division I. Leek Town finished ninth in the 2002–03 season.

The following season, Ramshaw joined Kidsgrove Athletic, leading them to success in the Staffordshire Senior Cup final by beating Conference side Stafford Rangers at the Brittania Stadium.

Ramshaw joined Phil Starbuck at Arnold Town during the 2003–04 season. Arnold Town had their best-ever run in the FA Vase (fifthround).

Ramshaw joined Lincoln United in October 2007. However, after only ten games in charge, he left to rejoin Eastwood Town as Paul Cox's assistant. During the next two seasons, the pair guided Eastwood Town to the Unibond Northern Premier League championship and promotion to the Football Conference (North); the third round proper of the FA Cup; the Peter Swales Trophy and the Nottinghamshire Senior Cup.

== 2011-Present ==
Ramshaw was named Shepshed Dynamo's first team manager in May 2011.

He returned to Eastwood Town as manager in November 2011, but left once again in October 2012, resigning due to ongoing financial difficulties at the club. Eastwood Town saw Nottinghamshire Senior Cup Final victory, the fifth time he had won this trophy in his career.

Ramshaw renewed his association with Paul Cox in November 2012 when he joined the coaching staff at Mansfield Town – where he was most recently Academy Manager at the League 2 side. His stewardship of the club's Academy saw 8 players progress to the professional ranks. In addition, the Youth Team won the HKL Development League, were twice runners-up in the Football Conference Youth Alliance and were the only League 2 side to reach the fourth round of the FA Youth Cup (2014/15 season). Ramshaw left the Stags in December 2014 following Cox's resignation.

On 29 June 2015 Ramshaw was once again reunited with Paul Cox, becoming assistant manager at National League side Torquay United.

In July 2018 he joined Hinckley AFC as assistant manager to James Jepson. Upon the resignation of Jepson in December 2018, Ramshaw was appointed the club's Manager. After the 2018/19 season, John Ramshaw left the club and later agreed to take over Hinckley's under 18's side.

On 24 October 2019, Ramshaw joined the National League North club, Kettering Town, as assistant manager.
