= Phil Starbuck =

English footballer (born 1968)

Personal information
- Full name: Philip Michael Starbuck
- Date of birth: 24 November 1968 (age 57)
- Place of birth: Nottingham, England
- Height: 5 ft 10 in (1.78 m)
- Position: Forward

Youth career
- 1984–1986: Nottingham Forest

Senior career*
Years	Team	Apps	(Gls)
1986–1991	Nottingham Forest	36	(2)
1988	→ Birmingham City (loan)	3	(0)
1990	→ Hereford United (loan)	6	(0)
1990	→ Blackburn Rovers (loan)	6	(1)
1991–1994	Huddersfield Town	137	(36)
1994–1997	Sheffield United	36	(2)
1995	→ Bristol City (loan)	5	(1)
1996	→ RKC Waalwijk (loan)	5	(2)
1997–1998	Oldham Athletic	10	(1)
1998	Plymouth Argyle	7	(0)
1998–1999	Cambridge City	12	(3)
2000–2002	Burton Albion		
2001–2003	Hucknall Town	23	(2)
2003–2004	Leigh RMI	10	(0)
2004–2006	Arnold Town	50	(9)

Managerial career
- 1999: Cambridge City (Player-Manager)
- 2001–2003: Hucknall Town (Player-Manager)
- 2003–2004: Leigh RMI (Player-Manager)
- 2005–2006: Arnold Town (Player-Manager)
- 2006–2008: Hednesford Town
- 2008–2009: Grantham Town
- * Club domestic league appearances and goals

Philip Michael Starbuck (born 24 November 1968) is an English former professional footballer who scored 43 goals from 245 appearances in the Football League playing for a number of different clubs. He started out as a striker then winger before eventually becoming an attacking midfielder.

Until June 2009 he was manager of Grantham Town.

== Playing career ==
Starbuck was born in Nottingham, and started his career as an apprentice at Nottingham Forest. He scored on his First Division debut at Newcastle United aged 18 in December 1986 and again in his second outing, a 1–1 draw against Liverpool on New Year's Day 1987. He spent time on loan at Birmingham City, Hereford United and Blackburn Rovers before moving to Huddersfield Town on a free transfer in 1991. On 12 April 1993, he set the record for the fastest goal scored by a substitute (since beaten) when he netted against Wigan Athletic just 3 seconds after entering the game. He then went to play at a higher level with Sheffield United before appearing for Bristol City, Oldham Athletic and Plymouth Argyle in the Football League, RKC Waalwijk in the Dutch Eredivisie, and Cambridge City and Burton Albion in non-league football, before going into management. His half-season at Cambridge City was marred by a broken leg sustained in a pre-season friendly against Coventry City. In all, he made 188 first team starts in the Football League, the most being 120 for Huddersfield, for whom he scored 36 goals.

== Management career ==
His first management job was at Hucknall Town, appointed in December 2001 and dismissed in June 2003. He joined Leigh RMI, initially as player-assistant manager, before being appointed manager in November 2003. He resigned in November 2004 and joined Arnold Town as a player. He went on to manage the club, before joining Hednesford Town on 31 May 2006. A successful first half to the 2006–07 season saw the Pitmen top the table in the Northern Premier league, before a poor run of form saw them eventually finish seventh. After losing his assistant manager John Ramshaw to Lincoln United in the summer of 2007, he brought in the experienced Jimmy Mullen as his new number two. Hednesford started the 2007–08 season well, but a run of inconsistent form saw them once again miss out on the play-offs, finishing eighth. In May 2008, Hednesford Town announced that Starbuck had left the club with immediate effect.

In October 2008, he took over as manager of Grantham Town in the Northern Premier League Division One South, and was sacked at the end of the 2008–09 season.

== Honours ==
Huddersfield Town

- Football League Trophy runner-up: 1993–94
