= Eastwood F.C. =

Association football club in England

Coordinates: 53°00′53″N 1°17′52″W

Eastwood
- Full name: Eastwood Football Club
- Nickname: Red Badgers
- Founded: 2014; 12 years ago
- Ground: Coronation Park, Eastwood
- Chairman: Ben Edwards
- League: United Counties League Premier Division North
- 2025–26: United Counties League Premier Division North, 7th of 20
Home colours

Eastwood Football Club is a football club based in Eastwood, Nottinghamshire, England. They are currently members of the United Counties League Premier Division North and play at Coronation Park. The club is a FA Charter Standard Club affiliated to the Nottinghamshire County Football Association. The club's nickname is the Red Badgers.

== History ==
The club was formed in 2014 following the folding of Eastwood Town. They joined the South Division of the Central Midlands League and entered the FA Vase for the first time a year later. After finishing as runners-up in the South Division in 2016–17, the club won the division the following season and were promoted to the East Midlands Counties League.

In 2021 Eastwood were promoted to the Premier Division North of the United Counties League based on their results in the abandoned 2019–20 and 2020–21 seasons.

== Ground ==
The club play their home games at Coronation Park. This was also the home ground for Eastwood Town.

== Honours ==
- Central Midlands League
  - South Division champions 2017–18

== Records ==
- Best FA Cup performance: First qualifying round, 2025–26
- Best FA Vase performance: Fourth round, 2018–19
