= Cotgrave F.C. =

Association football club in England

Cotgrave
- Full name: Cotgrave Football Club
- Founded: 1946
- Ground: Cotgrave Welfare
- Chairman: Paul Heard
- Manager: Scott Litchfield
- League: United Counties League Division One
- 2025–26: Nottinghamshire Senior League Premier Division, 1st of 17 (promoted)
Home colours	Away colours

Cotgrave Football Club is a football club based in Cotgrave, Nottinghamshire, England. They are currently members of the United Counties League Division One.

== History ==
Cotgrave F.C. were established in 1946. In 1983 they amalgamated with Cotgrave Welfare F.C., a team set up in 1968 by miners from the local colliery, and became Cotgrave United. The club have changed name several times since. They spent twelve seasons (1990–91 to 2001–02) as Cotgrave Miners Welfare, and four seasons (2002–03 to 2005–06) as Cotgrave Colliery Welfare United. In 2004, they were founder members of the Nottinghamshire Senior League (NSL). As Cotgrave Welfare they finished champions of the NSL in the 2025–26 season.

In 2026, the club was admitted into the United Counties League Division One.
