= Calverton F.C. =

Association football club in England

Coordinates: 53°02′35.10″N 1°06′07.59″W

Calverton
- Full name: Calverton Football Club
- Nickname: The Miners
- Founded: c. 1946
- Ground: Hollinwood Lane, Calverton
- Officials: Secretary – Vivien Corcoran; Director of Football – Damian Hucker
- Chairman: Dave Lee
- Manager: Aaron Jenkins
- League: Nottinghamshire Senior League Division One
- 2025–26: Nottinghamshire Senior League Division One, 5th of 14
Home colours	Away colours

Calverton Football Club is an association football club in Calverton, Nottinghamshire, England. They are members of the Nottinghamshire Senior League Division One and play at Hollinwood Lane. They play in Blue & White hoops, Blue shorts and Blue socks.

== History ==
Calverton Miners Welfare was formed shortly after the end of the Second World War and after playing a few friendly matches they joined division two of the Nottingham Spartan League at the start of the 1947–48 season. Six years later the club joined the Nottingham & District League and then the Nottinghamshire Senior League before transferring to the Central Alliance for the 1964–65 season. However, after just one season the club decided to move to the Nottinghamshire Combination League and remained there until 1988. In 1997 the club returned to the Nottinghamshire Football Alliance and gained promotion from Division 2 at their third attempt and by the 2002–03 season they were in that league's top division. Two seasons later the club became founder members of the Nottinghamshire Senior League and following ground improvements the club joined the Central Midlands League in 2006 and that season competed in the FA Vase. Two seasons later the club was promoted to the Supreme Division and when the league was re-organised in 2011 they were placed in the South Division. In 2025 Calverton Miners' Welfare F.C. merged with Rushcliffe F.C. to form Calverton F.C. (Although they still use Calverton Miners Welfare in some places) A brand new 4G facility was built in the summer of 2025 and named the Mary Earps Pitch after the England women's Goalkeeper. The club runs youth teams from under 8's right up to under 18's alongside the Mens senior section which includes Firsts, Reserves, Development, Under 23's and Veterans. There is a growing Girls section including an adult ladies team and development team. There are also several inclusivity teams for juniors and adults. They competed in the FA Vase for 6 seasons between 2006-2012, reaching the first round in their first 2 attempts. The following years they were beaten in the qualifying rounds including a 2008 1-4 loss against eventual runners up that season, Glossop North end.

The club nickname is The Miners. Record win = 12-0 vs Nottinghamshire 2 February 2013, Record defeat = 14-0 vs AJ Sport 29 October 2022, 14-0 vs Stapleford Town reserves 26 March 2022

== Honours ==
- Central Midlands League Premier Division
  - Runners-up 2007–08
- Nottinghamshire Senior League Division One
  - Champions 2016–17
- Nottinghamshire Senior League Intermediate Cup
  - Runners-up 2025–26
- Nottinghamshire Football Alliance Division Two
  - Runners-up 1999–2000

== Records ==
- FA Vase
  - First Round 2006–07, 2007–08

== Mary Earps Pitch ==
The Mary Earps Pitch, a new development surfaced in third-generation (3G) artificial turf financed by the Football Foundation under the Lionesses Futures Fund, was officially opened by Earps on 25 February 2026.
