= FCV Grace Dieu =

Association football club in England

Coordinates: 52.7576°N 1.3523°W

- Full name: FCV Grace Dieu
- Nickname: The Academy
- Founded: 2023; 3 years ago
- Ground: FCV Academy, Grace Dieu Manor Park
- Chairman: Ann Dyte
- Manager: Shane Clarke
- League: Midland League Division One
- 2025–26: United Counties League Division One, 6th of 23 (transferred)
- Website: https://internationalfootball.academy/
Home colours

FCV Grace Dieu is a semi-professional football club located near Thringstone in Leicestershire, England. It is the club of FCV International Football Academy.

== History ==
FCV Grace Dieu was founded in 2023, initially playing in Division One of the Nottinghamshire Senior League. They were promoted to the league's Premier division as runners up of the 2023-24 season, and then further promoted to Division One of the United Counties League after winning the Nottinghamshire Senior League's 2024-25 season.

== Stadium ==
FCV Grace Dieu currently plays on the pitches at FCV International Football Academy. The academy occupies the premises of Grace Dieu Manor, originally the home of the Beaumont baronets and later host to Grace Dieu Manor School until its closure in 2020.

== Achievements ==
- Nottinghamshire Senior League Division One:
  - Runners-up 2023-24
- Nottinghamshire Senior League Premier Division:
  - Winners 2024-25
  - League Cup Winners 2024-25
