= Nottinghamshire County Football Association =

Area sporting organization with 19th century origins

- Abbreviation: NFA
- Formation: 1882; 144 years ago
- Purpose: Governing football across Nottinghamshire
- Headquarters: Chetwynd Business Park, Chilwell, Nottingham
- Location: Chilwell, Nottinghamshire
- Coordinates: 52.9081932°N 1.2515082°W
- Chair: Robin Bourne
- Website: www.nottinghamshirefa.com

The Nottinghamshire Football Association, often known simply as the Notts FA, is the governing body of football in the county of Nottinghamshire, England. The Nottinghamshire FA runs a number of cups at different levels for teams across most of Nottinghamshire, as well as educating their affiliated clubs and members with relevant courses and events. A small number of clubs in the north of the county are members of the Sheffield and Hallamshire County Football Association.

== County cups ==
Competition	2023–24 Winners
Nottinghamshire Senior Cup	Nottingham Forest Under-21s
Nottinghamshire Senior Trophy	Wollaton
Nottinghamshire Sunday Senior Cup	Poets Young Boys
Nottinghamshire Sunday Senior Trophy	Beeston Cosa Nostra
Nottinghamshire Veterans Cup	Retford Veterans
Nottinghamshire Women's County Cup	Basford United W.F.C.

== Last 5 winners ==
Competition	2018–19	2019–20	2020–21	2021–22	2022–23	2023–24
Senior Cup	Basford United	Void	Void	Carlton Town	Newark & Sherwood United	Nottingham Forest U21
Sat. Senior Trophy	Sherwood Colliery	Void	Void	Retford United	Stapleford Town	Wollaton
Sunday Senior Cup	Crusaders A.F.C.	Void	Void	Poet Young Boys	Holy Trinity	Poet Young Boys
Sun. Senior Trophy	Hucknall Town	Void	Void	–	The Nabb Inn	Beeston Cosa Nostra
Women County Cup	Nottingham Forest W.F.C.	Void	Void	–	–	Basford United Ladies
Veterans Cup	Not Held	Not Held	Not Held	Not Held	Not Held	Retford Veterans
