= Sandiacre Town F.C. =

Association football club in England

Coordinates: 52°55′49.78″N 1°17′22.33″W

Sandiacre Town
- Full name: Sandiacre Town Football Club
- Nickname: The Saints
- Founded: 1978
- Ground: St Giles Park, Sandiacre
- League: United Counties League Division One
- 2025–26: United Counties League Division One, 10th of 23

Sandiacre Town Football Club is a football club based in Sandiacre, Derbyshire, England.

The club today has 38 teams including junior up to senior.

== History ==
Sandiacre Town Football Club was formed in 1978 by Malc Turton and Pete Smith and Tony Mattison. They had previously run the successful Ilkeston Town Under 14's, and saw the need for youth football in Sandiacre.

At the very first practice night over 150 youngsters turned up and it was decided to run three teams in the Notts Youth League at under 16's, 14's & 12's. The first Trophy for the club was when the under 14 team won the 1978-79 Notts. Youth league beating Clifton All Whites 5-2 to pip them to the league title. The team was run by Tony Mattison and Peter Thornley.

Season 1979-80 saw the number of youth teams grow to five with a Saturday senior side also being established and joining the Central Alliance League as one of the founding members.

In 1982, work started on building the Club Headquarters at St. Giles Park, the cost of the project was £40,000 with half the money being raised by Club members. The building work was carried out with the help of the Manpower Services Commission and was completed in 1984, The official opening on 28 March 1984 was performed by Peter Taylor and Roy McFarland from Derby County Football Club.

The club played in the Central Alliance League in the 1970s and 1980s. They were one of the founding members of the Central Midlands League in 1983, but the club lost its place in the league in 1990 after failing ground grading. In 1992, the club merged with Lace Web United. They were promoted to the CML again after finishing runners-up in 1991–92. They won the CML Premier Division in 1992–93. Their first appearance in the FA Vase was in 1995, and they reached the first round in 1997–98 and 2004–05.

== Honours ==
- Central Midlands League Premier Division
  - Champions 1992–93
- Midlands Regional Alliance
  - Runners-up 1991–92

== Records ==
- FA Vase
  - Second Round 2025–26
