= Stapleford Town F.C. =

Association football club in England

Stapleford Town
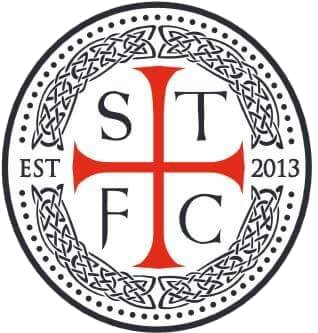
- Full name: Stapleford Town Football Club
- Nickname: The Saxons
- Founded: 2013
- Ground: Hickings Lane, Stapleford. Nottingham NG98PJ
- Chairman: Pete Scott
- Manager: Romaine Graham
- League: United Counties League Division One
- 2025–26: United Counties League Division One, 4th of 23
Home colours	Away colours	Third colours

Stapleford Town F.C. is a football club based in Stapleford, Nottinghamshire. They are currently members of the United Counties League Division One and play at Hickings Lane Stapleford.

== History ==
The club was formed in 2013, although a senior section was not started until 2017. Joining the Nottinghamshire Senior League (NSL), they won the Division One title in their inaugural 2017–18 season, and won the Premier Division title a year later. After winning the NSL championship for a third time in 2024, the club was promoted to Division One of the United Counties League.

The gestation of Stapleford Town Football Club commenced at the turn of the millennium with the formation of Stapleford Villa Football Club in 2002.

The vision at the heart of Stapleford Villa's football activities was the desire to provide and expand football facilities for youth and local residents of all ages with various pitches within Broxtowe Borough being used for home games.

After early successes the club declined due to a lack of professional management resources. In 2012 a core group consisting of some members of the previous management team and a group of supporters from the community in Stapleford, including parents, young people, local businesses and football enthusiasts, came together to relaunch the Club now known as Stapleford Town FC and affiliated it to Nottinghamshire FA.

In 2016 the Club successfully applied to Broxtowe Borough Council for a Preferential User Agreement for football on the site at Hickings Lane Recreation Ground. Preferential User status provides the Club with priority access to the football facilities throughout the football season, essentially granting them a home ground.

Also In 2016, a decision was made to form their senior section and after discussions with avid Derby County fan Rylan Stork and Matt Mardy, a team was entered for the 2017/18 season joining the Nottinghamshire Senior League (NSL). Using their extensive knowledge of local football and the wealth of players who, although lived in Stapleford, played football outside of the town a team was formed. The club also recruited rookie manager Adam ‘Lefty’ Campbell and managed to successfully navigate their way to a Nottinghamshire Senior League (NSL) Div 1 title and Notts FA Junior Cup double in their first season.

In 2018/19 they completed a back to back championship win lifting the Nottinghamshire Senior League Premier League title at the first attempt.

The 2019/20 defence of the league title was curtailed by the Global Covid Pandemic and as restrictions eased the club regrouped and with a new management team of Tristram Whitman, Danny Arnold and Jordan Hunter who took the club forward,

2021/22 saw them leave its home ground at Hickings Lane in search of promotion agreeing a ground share with Borrowash Victoria A.F.C. The club finished in 2nd place losing out in the chance for promotion in the closing weeks of the season to Southwell City FC.

2022/23 saw the club return to its home ground and back on top winning the Nottinghamshire Senior League Premier League title and Notts FA Senior Trophy,

The decision was made to try and gain promotion to United Counties League Division One and to achieve that they would need to try another ground share that would pass ground grading, The decision was made to groundshare at established Step 6 side Radford F.C.'s Selhurst Street ground.

2023/24 saw them win their third Premier division title in four years and achieved promotion.

The club was promoted to Division One of the United Counties League. for the 2024/25 season.

2025/26 season will see the team return to their home facility after a couple of seasons away, returning to two new 3G football pitches.

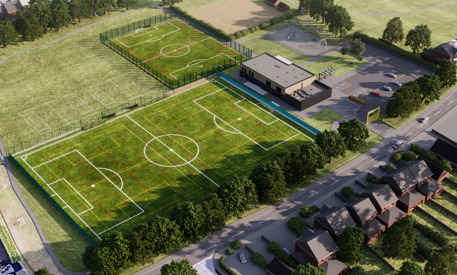

== Honours ==
*Nottinghamshire Senior League

  - Champions 2018–19, 2022–23, 2023–24
  - Div 1 Champions 2017–18

*Notts FA

  - Senior Trophy Winners 2022–23
  - Junior Trophy Winners 2017–18

== Records ==
- FA Vase
  - Second qualifying round, 2025-26, 2026–27
