= Hucknall Town F.C. =

English football club

Coordinates: 53.0262°N 1.2149°W

Hucknall Town
- Full name: Hucknall Town Football Club
- Nickname: The Yellows or The Town
- Founded: 1946 (as Hucknall Colliery Welfare)
- Ground: Aerial Way (RM stadium)
- Capacity: 4,000 (270 seated)
- Chairman: Bob Scotney
- Manager: Tris Whitman
- League: United Counties League Premier Division North
- 2025–26: United Counties League Premier Division North, 8th of 20
- Website: hucknalltownfc.co.uk
Home colours	Away colours

Hucknall Town Football Club is a football club based in the town of Hucknall, Nottinghamshire, England. The club is a member of the United Counties League Premier Division North and plays at the RM Stadium.

== History ==
Hucknall Town were renamed from Hucknall Colliery Welfare in 1987 and for the next two seasons finished first in the Notts Alliance. They moved into the Central Midlands League where they finished first in both 1989–90 and 1990–91 and runners-up in 1991–92 to Lincoln United. The league cup was also won in all three seasons with the losing finalists being the now defunct Crookes, Nottingham neighbours Arnold Town and Nettleham.

Hucknall Town were promoted to the Northern Counties East League Division One and then to the Premier Division where they struggled in the Premier Division until 1996–97, when they recovered from a poor start to finish sixth. However, the League Cup and President's Cup made their way to Watnall Road with Hucknall beating Pontefract Colleries and Belper Town in the respective finals. It was the second time they had won the League Cup, having beaten Thackley in 1994.

In 1997–98, they won the Northern Counties East League and retained the league cup with North Ferriby United finishing second in both competitions. The following season came as a major surprise as Hucknall finished second in Division One, behind Droylsden. The title would have been won but for an early-season points deduction.

From 1999 to 2004 they played in the Northern Premier League Premier Division, winning the championship in the 2003–04 season. However, as their Watnall Road ground did not meet the standards of the Football Conference, they were refused promotion to the Conference National division and had to settle for a place in the new Conference North.

They were due to be relegated from the Conference North to the Northern Premier League Premier Division following the 2007–08 season. This would have been the first relegation from any league in the club's history. However, Halifax Town's financial woes meant that they were reprieved. The club were eventually relegated at the end of the 2008–09 season.

Relegation following the 2010–2011 season saw them drop into the Division One South, and further financial woes lead to them relegated again, three levels in 2012–13 to Central Midlands League South Division.

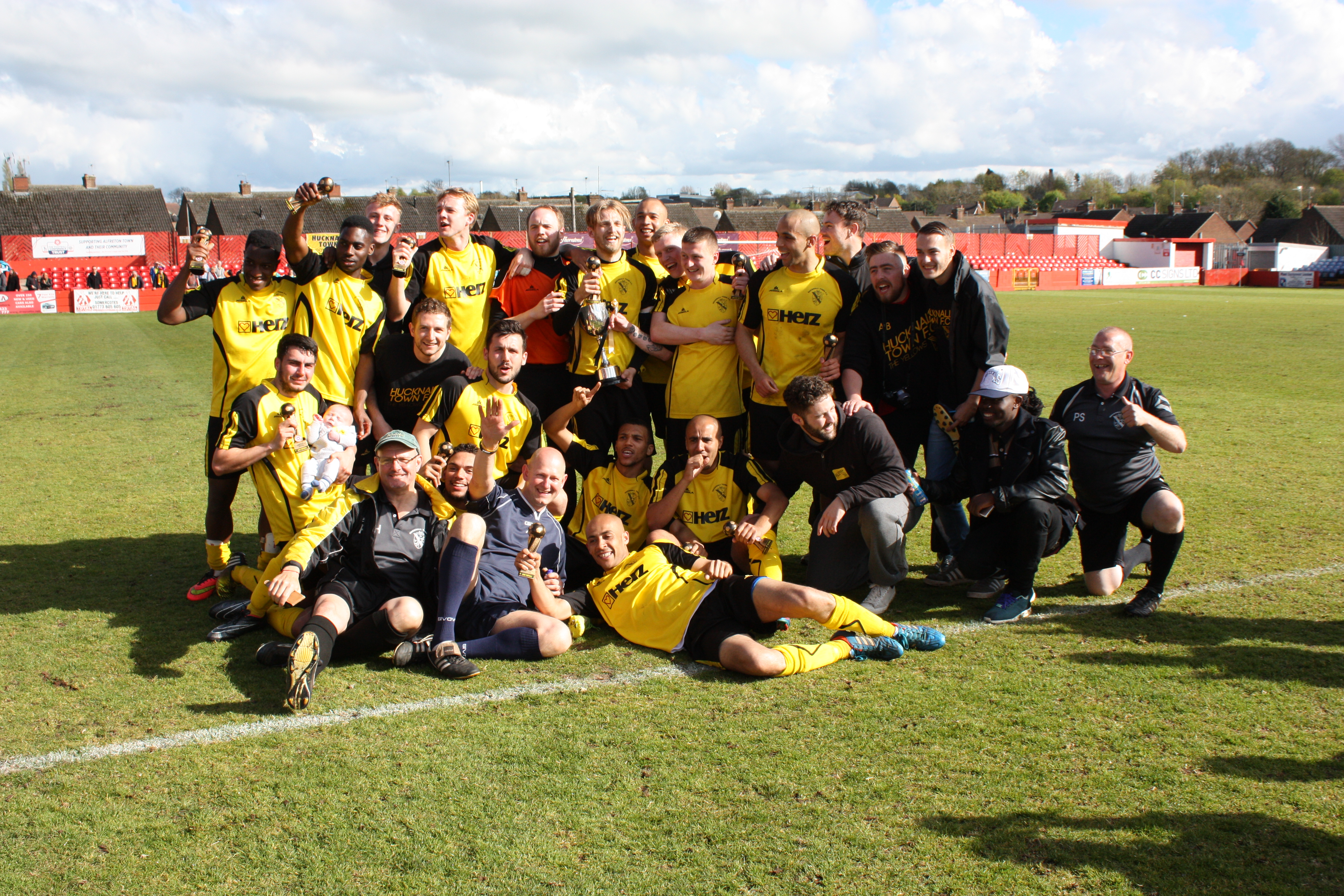
Squad with the Central Midlands League Cup

In the 2014–15 season, Hucknall Town finished 4th in the Central Midlands League and won the Central Midlands League Cup, beating Clifton All Whites 3–0 at Alfreton Town's North Street ground.

Hucknall Town became Central Midlands League South divisional champions in the 2018–19 season.

Following the 2022–2023 season, with Andy Ingle as the first team manager, Hucknall Town were promoted from the United Counties following two penalty shoot-out wins during the end of season promotion play-offs. The semi-final was against Bourne Town and the final against Birstall United

May 2025, Hucknall Town won the Nottinghamshire Senior Cup for the 7th time in their history by beating Newark and Sherwood United F.C. in front of 1025 spectators at Field Mill, aka One Call Stadium in Mansfield in a game that finished 5- 5 in normal time and 6- 6 after extra time, with the Yellows claiming the trophy 4 - 3 on penalties.

== Stadium ==
The club played at the Watnall Road ground, which has a 5,000 capacity with 270 seats with the development side. Hucknall Town Sunday and the Vet's team also played home fixtures at Watnall Road on the training pitch.

In May 2008, Worksop Town of the Northern Premier League became Hucknall's tenants, although the agreement was not renewed after the 2008–09 season.

In May 2015, it was announced that work had started on a new stadium. The club had hoped to move into the new stadium just off Aerial Way (across the road from the current stadium) for the 2017–18 season. Their final games were both 2–0 defeats, the last league game was against Aylestone Park, 806 fans attended the match, then 4 days later on 19 October 2022, 290 fans watched the yellows play at Watnall Road for one final time, against Basford United in the Nottinghamshire Senior Cup.

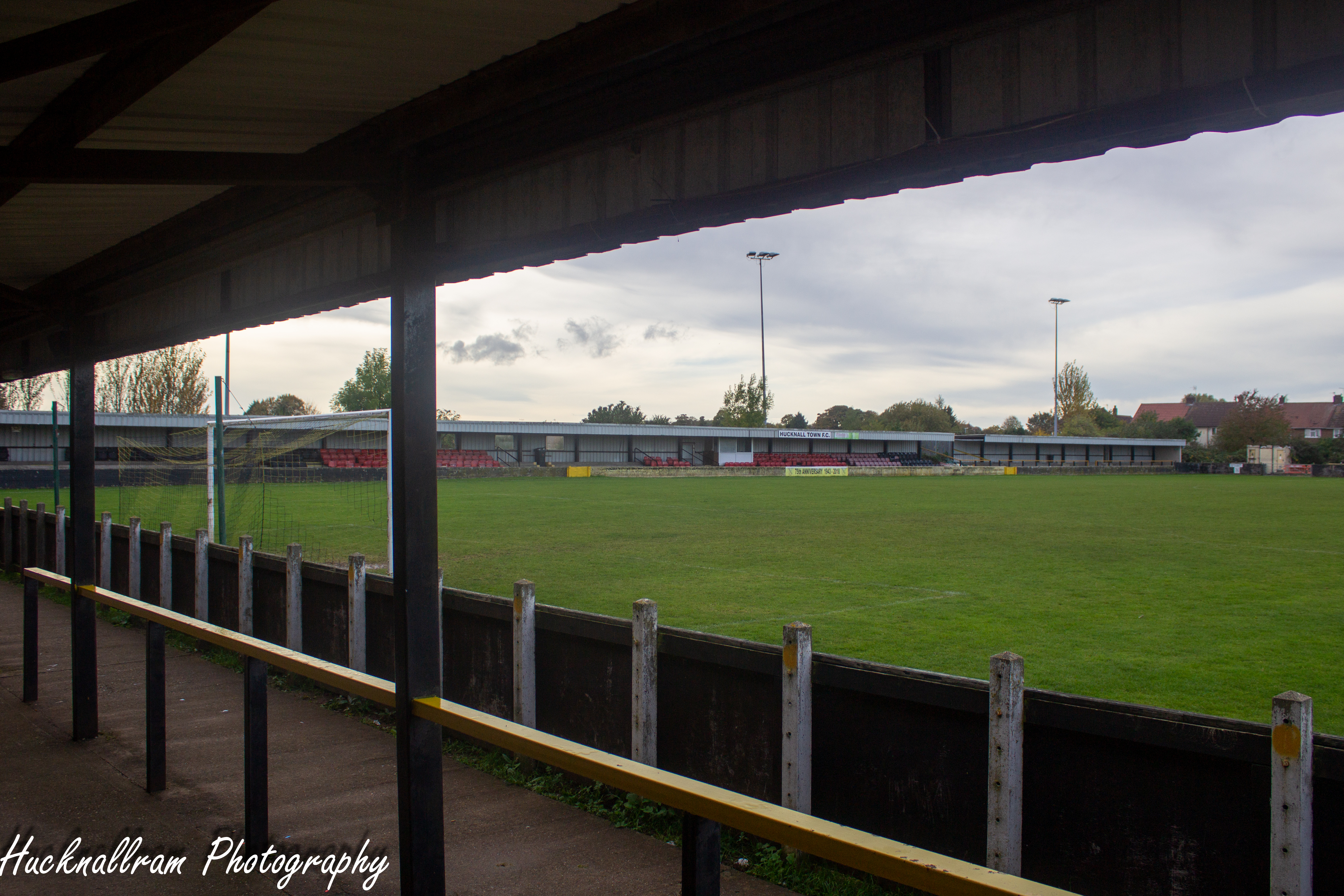
Watnall Road, Former home of Hucknall Town FC

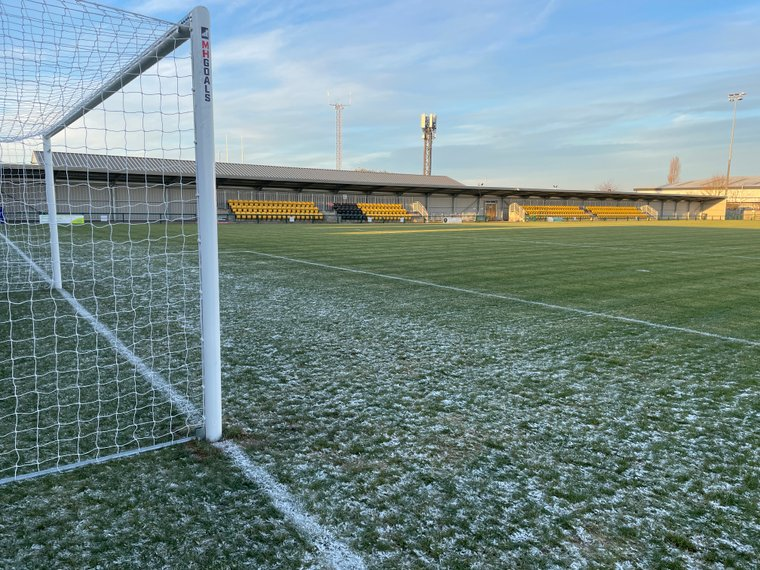
RM Stadium, the new home of Hucknall Town FC

Hucknall Town finally moved to their new stadium off Aerial Way, called RM Stadium (sponsored by RM Resources), and it was opened by Nigel Clough. The Yellows won their first game 3-2 vs Harrowby United on 7 January 2023 in front of 392 fans.

== First Team squad ==
Note: Flags indicate national team as defined under FIFA eligibility rules; some limited exceptions apply. Players may hold more than one non-FIFA nationality.

No.	Pos.	Nation	Player
—	GK	ENG	Alfie Smith-Eccles
—	GK	ENG	Isaac Smith
—	DF	ENG	Brad Holmes
—	DF	ENG	Dillon Rawson
—	DF	ENG	Ethan Greenidge
—	DF	ENG	Trent Jules
—	DF	ENG	Taylor Jaine
—	DF	ENG	Reece Sugars
—	DF	ENG	Alfie Matthews
—	DF	ENG	Tom Rood
—	DF	ENG	Frankie Timson
—	MF	ENG	Joe Ashurst
—	MF	NED	Kareem Abouraia

No.	Pos.	Nation	Player
—	MF	GHA	Kofi Appiah
—	MF	ENG	Omreiki Myles
—	MF	JAM	Deshonte Myles
—	MF	SDN	Mutawakel Eisa
—	MF	ENG	Nashiem Isman
—	FW	ENG	Jordan Black
—	FW	ENG	Niall Towle
—	FW	NGR	Gabriel Ebede
—	FW	ENG	Issa Gaye
—	FW	ENG	Trevell Lindo
—	FW	ENG	Calum Law
—	FW	ENG	Callum Orange
—	FW	ENG	Marcus Marshall

== Managers ==
The manager from 1995 to 2001, as Town rose from the Northern Counties East League to the Northern Premier League Premier Division, was Geordie John Ramshaw. He was followed by Phil Starbuck and then Steve Burr. Former Leek Town and Gainsborough Trinity boss Ernie Moss was manager for a short spell during the first part of the 2004–05 season.

Former Bury player Dean Barrick was player-manager until January 2006. Dean Barrick was popular amongst the club's fans, and was voted BBC Radio Nottingham Sports Personality of the Year in 2005, having led the club to the FA Trophy final.

Barrick was replaced in February 2006 by Kevin Wilson, the former Northampton Town and Kettering Town manager.

In January 2007, Wilson was sacked as manager, and former Welsh international player Andy Legg was appointed as the new player-manager. Legg remained as manager until September 2007, when he resigned following six consecutive defeats at the start of the season. David Lloyd replaced Legg, but having failed to avoid a relegation position, was sacked before the final game of the 2007–08 season and replaced by Mick Galloway and Andy Miller. In November 2008, former Eastwood Town manager Brian Chambers was appointed as Director of Football. Galloway and Miller were appointed as coaches. However, the clubs stated that he was to work with Galloway, rather than replace him. Although after a further defeat against King's Lynn, Galloway and Miller were dismissed and replaced by Chambers Chambers resigned as manager in January 2010

In May 2022, Andy Graves the club's longest serving manager resigned following defeat in the United Counties Division One play off semi-final against Hinckley A.F.C.

Former reserve team manager Andy Ingle took over first-team affairs, with former player Michael Banister taking up the role of assistant manager; with the help of Darren Jubb, the trio achieved promotion via a 5-3 penalty shootout win in the play-off final at Birstall United.

Hucknall struggled after the promotion, on 8 September assistant manager Michael Banister stepped down as he felt that he could no longer commit the enormous amount of time that is required for the role of assistant manager going forward and then almost a week later on the 14th, manager Andy Ingles also stepped down due to the significant demands of the role, Andy was no longer able to commit the time needed to address the current and ongoing challenges of step 5 football. Phil Henry and Darren Jubb took charge of a couple of games before Hucknall appointed joint managers Reece Limbert & Louis Bland on 3 October. The joint appointment was short-lived as Louis Bland received an offer from step 4 club Grantham Town in the capacity of first team manager permanently. Reece Limbert took full charge of the first team. Limbert resigned after 12 months with the club after Town's 4-1 defeat to Heanor Town.

Town appointed former Yellow player Tris Whitman as their new manager, with Aaron Large as his assistant; both came from a successful time at Stapleford Town. In April 2026, Whitman accepted the manager's job at Ilkeston Town F.C. after guiding Hucknall to 8th in the league.

On 14 May 2026, Hucknall appointed joint managers of Jonathan D’Laryea & Rudy Funk. Despite a good start to the season, by October a run of poor results saw the management duo replaced by Tris Whitman, who has just been replaced at Ilkeston Town.

Years	Manager
1987–1988	Ted Mullane
1988–1990	Roger Dawkins
1990–1991	Steve Dykes
1991–1995	Ted Mullane
1995–2001	John Ramshaw
2001–2003	Phil Starbuck
2003–2004	Steve Burr
2004	Ernie Moss
2004–2006	Dean Barrick
2006–2007	Kevin Wilson
2007	Andy Legg
2007–2008	David Lloyd
2008	Mick Galloway and Andy Miller
2008–2010	Brian Chambers
2010–2010	Danny Bryant
2010–2012	Tommy Brookbanks
2012–2012	Des Lyttle
2012–2012	Brett Marshall
2012–2012	Gary Sucharewycz
2012–2012	Jason Truscott
2012–2013	Darren Kelk
2013	Duncan Russell
2013–2022	Andy Graves
2022–2023	Andy Ingle
2023	Reece Limbert & Louis Bland
2023-2024	Reece Limbert
2024-2026	Tris Whitman
2026	Jonathan D’Laryea (JD) & Rudy Funk
2026-	Tris Whitman

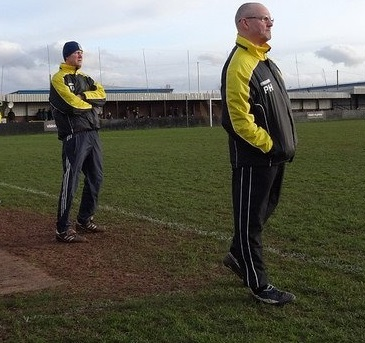
Andy Graves (left) and Phil Henry (right), long-time manager and assistant manager at Hucknall Town

== Honours ==
- FA Trophy
  - Runners-up 2004–05
- Northern Premier League
  - Premier Division champions 2003–04
  - Chairman's Cup winners 2002–03
  - Division One runners-up 1998–99
- Northern Counties East League
  - Premier Division champions 1997–98
  - League Cup winners 1993–94, 1996–97, 1997–98
  - Presidents Cup winners 1996–97
- Central Midlands League
  - Supreme Division champions 1989–90, 1990–91
  - South Division champions 2018–19
  - Supreme Division runners-up 1991–92
  - League Cup winners 1989–90, 1990–91, 1991–92, 2014–15
  - League Cup runners-up 2016–17, 2018–19
  - Reserve League Champions 2015–16
  - Reserve League Cup winners 2015–16
- Nottinghamshire Alliance
  - Senior Division champions 1976–77, 1977–78, 1987–88, 1988–89
  - Division One champions 1972–73, 1980–81, 1986–87 (all but 1972–73 by reserve team)
  - Division Two champions 1970–71
  - Intermediate Cup winners 1972–73, 1978–79, 1979–80, 1980–81, 1983–84 (all but 1972–73 by reserve team)
  - League Cup winners 1978–79
- Nottinghamshire Senior Cup
  - Winners 1984–85, 1990–91, 1997–98, 1999–00, 2000–01, 2002–03, 2024- 25
  - Runners-up 1989–90, 1998–99
- Notts Intermediate Cup
  - Winners 1987–88, 1997–98 (both reserve team)
- Notts Junior Cup
  - Winners 1963
- United Counties League
  - Division One Play-off Winner 2022–23

== Notable former players ==
Several players have played or gone on to play in the Football League:

- (England) Danny Bacon; Lincoln City.
- (Northern Ireland) Saul Deeney; Derby County
- (England) Terry Hawkridge; Notts County, Mansfield Town and Scunthorpe United
- (England) Liam Hearn; Mansfield Town.
- (Republic of Ireland) Leon McSweeney; Stockport County, Hartlepool United and Leyton Orient via Cork City.
- (England) Stuart Nelson; Brentford, Leyton Orient, Norwich City. and Gillingham, Aberdeen and Notts County.
- (England) Junior Ogedi-Uzokwe; Colchester United and Derry City
- (England) Andy Todd; Accrington Stanley, Rotherham United and Mansfield Town
- (England) Craig Westcarr; Nottingham Forest, Lincoln City, MK Dons, Cambridge United, Notts County, Chersterfield; Walsall, Portsmouth, Mansfield Town
- (England) Andy White; Boston United, Crewe Alexandra, Kidderminster Harriers, Mansfield Town and Notts County
