= Collingham F.C. (Nottinghamshire) =

Association football club in England

Coordinates: 53°8′44.1″N 0°45′21.6″W

Collingham
- Full name: Collingham Football Club
- Nicknames: The Oaks, CFC
- Founded: 1887
- Ground: Station Road, Collingham
- Chairman: Paul Ellison
- Manager: Carl Muggleton
- League: Nottinghamshire Senior League Premier Division
- 2025–26: Nottinghamshire Senior League Premier Division, 10th of 17
- Website: https://www.collinghamfootballclub.co.uk
Home colours

Collingham Football Club is a football club based in Collingham, Nottinghamshire, England. They are currently members of the Nottinghamshire Senior League Premier Division and play at Station Road.

== History ==
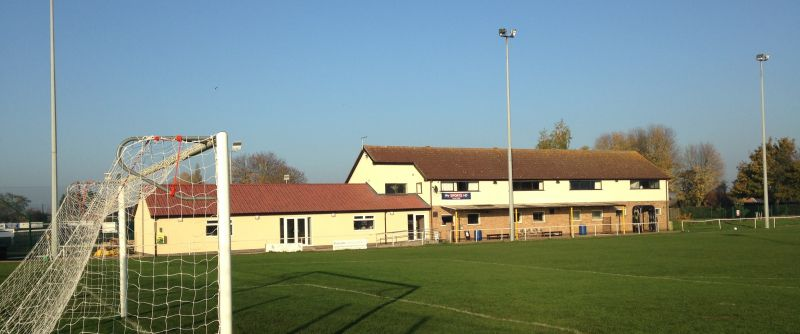
Station Road, the club's home stadium

The club was established in 1887. In 1995, a Senior Saturday team was created which joined the Central Midlands League Premier Division.

Having finished 14th in their 1st season promotion to the Supreme Division was clinched the following season by finishing 4th. The following 5 seasons were played out in the Supreme division with a best placed finish of 5th in the 2000/01 season which also included an appearance in the league cup final in which a goal in stoppage time gave Shirebrook Town the trophy in a 1–0 win.

The 2001–02 season saw entry into the FA Vase for the first time in the club's history. The 2nd Qualifying round match vs Meir KA was played at Station Road on 22 September 2001, resulting in a 2–1 win for Collingham. Boston Town were the opposition in the 1st round proper on 20 October, but the cup run come to an end after a 3–2 defeat.

At the end of the 2001–02 season, the team from Collingham was disbanded and it was not until the 2015–16 season that the team returned to this level of football.

== Honours ==
- Nottinghamshire Senior League
  - Premier Division Runners-up 2023/24
  - NSL Senior Cup Winners 2023/24
  - NSL Junior Cup Winner 2024/25
  - NSL Intermediate Cup Winners 2025/26
  - Saturday Senior Trophy Winners 2025/26
- Central Midlands Alliance League
  - Phoenix Trophies Floodlit Cup Winners 2017/18
  - Phoenix Trophies Floodlit Cup Runners-up 2018/19
  - Central Midlands League Challenge Cup Runners-up 2017/18

== Records ==
- Best FA Vase performance: First round (2001–02)
