= FA Charter Standard Award =

FA Charter Standard logo

The FA's Charter Standard Award recognises and rewards high quality of levels of provision in club, league and schools football. There are three levels of FA Charter Standard Award for organisations to recognise the different standards. The entry level is an 'FA Charter Standard Club', the next is an 'FA Charter Development Club', and the most advanced is the 'FA Charter Community Club'.

Since it was launched in 2001, the award has been granted to 4,500 clubs with 460 advanced level Community clubs and 120 leagues, and there are now over 2,500 Charter Standard Award Schools in England.
