= Nottinghamshire Football League =

Association football league in England

- Founded: 2004
- Country: England
- Number of clubs: 88; 18 (Premier Division); 18 (Division One); 17 (Division Two); 17 (Division Three); 18 (Development Division)
- Level on pyramid: Level 11 (Premier Division)
- Promotion to: Level 10; Northern Counties East League Division One; United Counties League Division One Midland Football League Division One
- Domestic cup: League Cup
- Current champions: Cotgrave FC (Premier Division); Stapleford Town Reserves (Division One); AJ Sport FC (Division Two); Calverton Miners Welfare Reserves (Division Three) (2025–26)
- Website: Official Website

The Nottinghamshire Football league is an English football league. The competition is a feeder to the Northern Counties East League and the United Counties League. The league has five divisions – the Premier Division (which stands at level 11 of the English football league system), NSL Division One, NSL Division Two, NSL Division Three and the NSL Development Division. The league expanded from three divisions in 2020 having absorbed the Midland & Notts Alliance League. It was renamed in 2026 from the Nottinghamshire Senior League, following a merger with the Notts Youth League.

== History ==
It was founded in 2004 to replace the Nottinghamshire Football Alliance League as the top league within the county of Nottinghamshire.

== Current member clubs (2026–27) ==
=== Premier Division ===
- AC United
- Arnold Town
- Awsworth Villa
- Beeston
- Bingham Town
- Collingham
- Keyworth United
- Kimberley Miners Welfare Reserves
- Meden Vale Colts
- Newark and Sherwood United
- Notts Olympic F.C.
- Rainworth Miners Welfare
- Ruddington Village
- Southwell City Reserves
- Stapleford Town Reserves
- West Bridgford Reserves
- Wollaton
- Woodthorpe Park Rangers

=== NSL Division One ===
- AFC Parabellum
- AJ Sport
- Ashland Rovers
- Bilborough TRD
- Calverton Miners Welfare
- Clifton All Whites Reserves
- Collingham Reserves
- Cotgrave Reserves
- East Leake Robins
- Elston United
- FC Cavaliers
- Hucknall Town Reserves
- Keyworth United Reserves
- Pass Move Grin F.C.
- Quorn Reserves
- Radcliffe Olympic
- Ravenshead F.C.
- Wollaton Reserves

=== NSL Division Two ===
- Arnold Town Reserves
- Ashland Rovers Reserves
- Attenborough FC
- Basford United Reserves
- Beeston Reserves
- Bottlesford FC
- Calverton Miners Welfare Reserves
- City United
- Grantham Town Reserves
- Holbrook Sports Blue
- Ilkeston Town Reserves
- Matlock Town Reserves
- Notts City Rangers
- Nottingham Finest
- Ravenshead Reds
- Sawley Spartans
- Southwell City Development

=== NSL Division Three ===
- AFC Warriors
- AJ Sport Reserves
- Awsworth Villa Reserves
- Bingham Town Reserves
- Calverton Miners Welfare Reserves
- East Leake Robins Reserves
- FC Viking
- Meden Vale Colts Development
- Nottingham Greens
- Notts City Rangers Reserves
- Parkhall FC
- Pelican FC
- Phoenix Athletic
- Priory Celtic
- Robin Hood Colts
- Rolls Royce
- The Rossoneri F.C.

=== Development Division ===
- Arnold Town Development
- Beaufort United Development
- Burton Joyce U23
- Calverton MW U23's
- Collingham Development
- Cotgrave Development
- Dunkirk U23
- Grantham Town U23
- Linby CW Development
- Matlock Town U23
- Mickleover U23 Development
- Newark & Sherwood United Development
- Radcliffe Olympic U23
- Shirebrook Town Reserves
- Stapleford Town U23
- Walesby U23
- Willow Wanderers U23
- Wollaton FC U23

== Champions ==
Season	Premier Division	Division One	Division Two	League Cup Senior Section	League Cup Junior Section		
2004–05	Wollaton	Boots Athletic Reserves	N/A	Wollaton	Attenborough Reserves		
2005–06	Wollaton	Wollaton Reserves	N/A	Clifton	Boots Athletic Reserves		
2006–07	Cotgrave Welfare	Clifton Reserves	N/A	Caribbean Cavaliers	Boots Athletic Reserves		
2007–08	Caribbean Cavaliers	Hucknall Rolls Leisure	N/A	Caribbean Cavaliers	Wollaton Reserves		
2008–09	Bilborough Pelican	Bulwell	Calverton Miners Welfare	Wollaton	Greenwood Meadows Reserves		
2009–10	Clifton	Wollaton Reserves	Vernon Villa	Caribbean Cavaliers	Carlton Town Colts		
2010–11	Boots Athletic	Ruddington Village	Southwell St. Mary's	Boots Athletic	Cotgrave Welfare Reserves		
2011–12	Bulwell	Carlton Town Academy	Burton Joyce	Bulwell	Carlton Town Academy		
2012–13	Bulwell	Beeston	Clifton Reserves	Bulwell	Wollaton Reserves		
2013–14	Selston	Kirton Brickworks	Moorgreen	Hucknall Rolls Leisure	Linby Colliery Welfare Reserves		
2014–15	Wollaton	Underwood Villa	Kimberley Miners Welfare 'A'	Wollaton	Kimberley Miners Welfare Reserves		
2015–16	Ruddington Village	South Normanton Town	Awsworth Villa Reserves	Awsworth Villa	Kimberley Miners Welfare Reserves		
2016–17	Clifton All Whites	Calverton Miners Welfare	Team DNF	Cotgrave	Awsworth Villa Reserves		
2017–18	Newark Flowserve	Stapleford Town	Woodthorpe Park Rangers	Newark Flowserve	Woodthorpe Park Rangers		
2018–19	Stapleford Town	Woodthorpe Park Rangers	Newark Flowserve Reserves	Southwell City	Robin Hood Colts		
2019–20	Void	Void	Void	Void	Void		
2020–21	Void	Void	Void	Void	Void		
Season	Premier Division	Division One	Division Two North	Division Two South	League Cup Senior Section	League Cup Intermediate Section	League Cup Junior Section
2021–22	Southwell City	Radcliffe Olympic	Bestwood Colliery	East Leake Robins	AFC Dunkirk	Stapleford Town Development	Stapleford Town Development
Season	Premier Division	Division One	Division Two	Division Three	League Cup Senior Section	League Cup Intermediate Section	League Cup Junior Section
2022–23	Stapleford Town	Ruddington Village	West Bridgford Colts III	Southwell City Development	Sandiacre Town	Stapleford Town Reserves	Elston United
2023–24	Stapleford Town	FC Cavaliers	AFC Colsterworth	Gedling Southbank	Collingham	Stapleford Town Reserves	Arnold Town Reserves
2024–25	FCV Grace Dieu	Kimberley Miners Welfare Reserves	Elston United	Beeston Reserves	FCV Grace Dieu	Hucknall Town Reserves	Collingham Reserves
Season	Premier Division	Division One	Division Two	Division Three	League Cup Senior Section	League Cup Intermediate Section	League Cup Junior Section
2025-26	Cotgrave FC	Stapleford Town Reserves	AJ Sport FC	Calverton Miners Welfare Reserves	Cotgrave FC	Collingham Reserves	Quorn FC Methodists
