= Kimberley Miners Welfare F.C. =

Association football club in England

Coordinates: 52.996213°N 1.2506041°W

Kimberley Miners Welfare
- Full name: Kimberley Miners Welfare Football Club
- Nickname: Miners
- Founded: 1926
- Ground: The Stag Ground, Kimberley
- Chairman: Ryan Doherty
- Manager: Ant Ward
- League: United Counties League Premier Division North
- 2025–26: United Counties League Premier Division North, 14th of 20
Home colours

Kimberley Miners Welfare Football Club is a football club based in Kimberley, Nottinghamshire, England. They are currently members of the United Counties League Premier Division North and play at the Stag Ground.

== History ==
The club was established in 1926, a year after the establishment of the Miners Welfare facility in the town. They joined the Notts Spartan League and were league champions in 1947–48. After winning back-to-back titles in 1964–65 and 1965–66, the club joined the Notts Combination, winning its Junior Cup in 1972–73. The club later joined the Notts Amateur League, which they won in 1985–86.

In 1995 Kimberley joined Division Two of the Notts Alliance. They won the division in 1996–97, earning promotion to Division One. After winning Division One in 1999–2000 the club was promoted to the Senior Division. In 2005 they were founder members of the Notts Senior League and were placed in the Senior Division. The division was later renamed the Premier Division, and after finishing as Premier Division runners-up in 2013–14, the club were promoted to the East Midlands Counties League. They remained members of the league until it was disbanded at the end of the 2020–21 season, at which point they were transferred to Division One of the United Counties League. They were Division One champions in 2021–22 and were promoted to the Premier Division North.

== Ground ==
After their establishment, the club played at Mill Field until moving to Digby Street in 1932. The Digby Street ground was initially very basic, with players changing in the front room of a house some distance from the ground. During the 1974–75 season the club played at the Wolsey Sports Ground whilst the A610 road was built, with part of Digby Street used during the road's construction. In 2012 the club moved to the Stag Ground, previously used by Kimberley Town.

== Honours ==
- United Counties League
  - Division One champions 2021–22
- Notts Alliance
  - Division One champions 1999–2000
  - Division Two champions 1996–97
- Notts Amateur League
  - Champions 1985–86
- Notts Combination
  - Junior Cup winners 1972–73
- Notts Spartan League
  - Champions 1947–48, 1964–65, 1965–66

== Records ==
- Best FA Cup performance: First qualifying round, 2022–23
- Best FA Vase performance: Second round, 2017–18, 2021–22, 2025–26

== See also ==
- Kimberley Miners Welfare F.C. managers
- Kimberley Miners Welfare F.C. players
