= Brinkley, Nottinghamshire =

Hamlet in Nottinghamshire, England

Coordinates: 53.06°N 0.93°W

Brinkley
- Hamlet
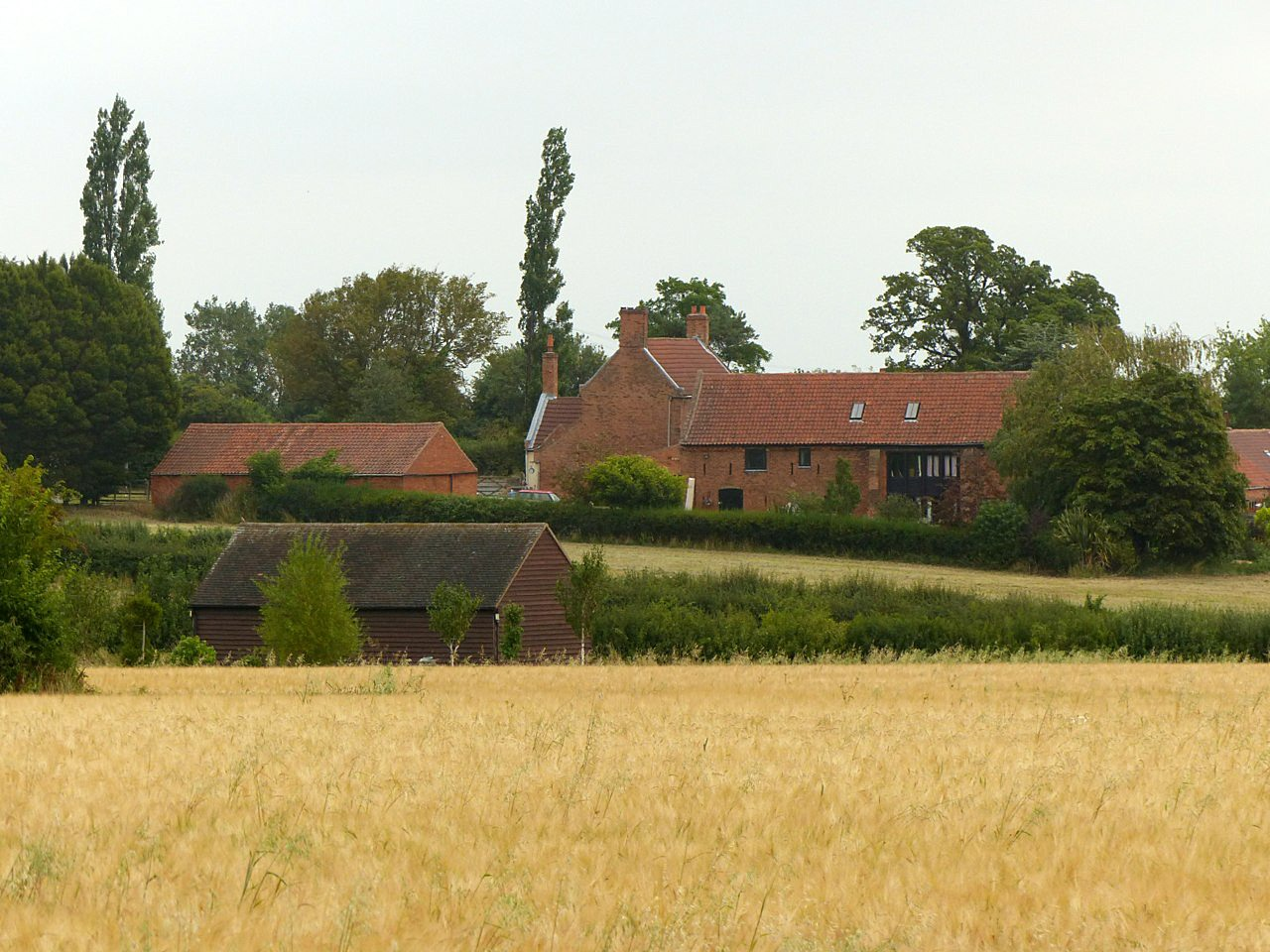

- Location within Nottinghamshire
- OS grid reference: SK714515
- Civil parish: Southwell
- District: Newark and Sherwood
- Shire county: Nottinghamshire
- Region: East Midlands
- Country: England
- Sovereign state: United Kingdom
- Post town: SOUTHWELL
- Postcode district: NG25
- Police: Nottinghamshire
- Fire: Nottinghamshire
- Ambulance: East Midlands
- UK Parliament: Newark

Brinkley is a hamlet in Nottinghamshire, England. It is located 1 mile south-east of Southwell, and is within the Southwell civil parish.
