= Newark and Sherwood United F.C. =

Association football club in England

Coordinates: 53°8′44.1″N 0°45′21.6″W

- Full name: Newark and Sherwood United Football Club
- Nickname: The Highwaymen
- Founded: 1901
- Ground: Coronation Park, Balderton, Nottinghamshire
- Capacity: 1500
- Chairman: Michael Hardy
- Manager: Grant Foster
- League: Nottinghamshire Senior League Premier Division
- 2025–26: United Counties League Premier Division North, 18th of 20 (resigned)
Home colours	Away colours

Newark and Sherwood United F.C. is a football club that represents the town of Newark-on-Trent, Nottinghamshire and were based at the Lowfields Ground, Hawton Lane, Balderton for over 100 years, (1901 - 2021). They are currently members of the Nottinghamshire Senior League Premier Division and play at Coronation Park in Balderton having previously ground shared at Harrowby United F.C. in Grantham.

== History ==
Founded in 1901 as A.J. Simpson and Co., the football club began life in the Newark Ironmongers' League. No records survive from those early days, but it is known that in 1935 the club, now renamed Worthington Simpson, entered the Nottingham Spartan League. After winning back-to-back titles, Simmo's or the Works (as the club became known locally) joined the Notts Alliance League in 1949, going on to win that title in the momentous football years of 1953 and 1966. The Notts Alliance Cup brought the club's greatest success up to that point, first in 1970 beating Notts Combined Police two-nil in a replay at Notts County's Meadow Lane ground and then the trophy returning to Newark in 1972 after an epic five-three extra time victory. The trophy returned to Newark again 1981, 1989 and finally 1999. Name changes followed in the late 1990s, first to IDP and then to Newark Flowserve, and in 2004 the club's name was entered into the first level of the FA's national pyramid by joining the Central Midlands League Premier Division. Following a short break, the first team re-formed in 2013 and finished a creditable third in Notts Senior League (NSL) Division Two, securing promotion to the First Division. Another successful campaign followed a year later when the team finished runners-up and clinched their place in the NSL Premier Division, taking the club back to step seven football. In 2001 they changed name again, to Newark Flowserve, and in 2004 they opted to join the Central Midlands League. After a five-year stint in the CML, Flowserve joined the Nottinghamshire Senior League.

In 2018, the club won 31 of its 34 league matches to secure the league championship, and with it promotion to Step 6. In May 2018 their promotion to the East Midlands Counties League was ratified by the Football Association League Committee. The club won promotion to the Midland league at the end of the 2018/19 season. In May 2020 the club was again renamed, to Newark. At the end of the 2020–21 season they were transferred to the Premier Division North of the United Counties League. The end of the 2020/21 witnessed the final ever game at Lowfields following their ground being sold to a property developer. The club played their home games for the season 2021/22 at Basford Utd's Greenwich Ave ground. In May 2022 the club again changed name, this time to Newark and Sherwood United F.C. and the club moved to share with Collingham F.C. at Station Road, Collingham. In May 2023 the club won the Notts Senior Cup for the first time in their history by beating Carlton Town 3–2 in the final played at Eastwood. From 2024/25 the club are ground sharing with Harrowby United FC in Grantham.

- Record Attendance 1002 v's Nottingham Forest 13 February 2023, Notts Senior Cup Semi-Final at Station Rd, Collingham.

== Records ==
- Best FA Cup performance: Second qualifying round, 2020–21 (as Newark FC)
- Best FA Vase performance: Fourth round, 2019–20 (as Newark Flowserve)

== Honours ==
Notts Alliance League Champions 1948/49, 1952/53, 1965/66.

Notts Alliance Cup 1969/70, 1971/72, 1980/81, 1988/89, 1998/99

- Nottinghamshire Senior League
  - Champions 2017/18

EMCL Cup Winners 2018/19

Nottinghamshire Senior Cup Champions 2022/23

== See also ==
- Newark F.C. players
- Newark and Sherwood United F.C. managers
