= Tommy White (footballer, born 1908) =

English footballer (1908–1967)

Personal information
- Full name: Thomas Angus White
- Date of birth: 29 July 1908
- Place of birth: Pendleton, Lancashire, England
- Date of death: 13 August 1967 (aged 59)
- Place of death: Liverpool, England
- Height: 5 ft 9 1/2 in (1.77 m)
- Positions: Centre-forward; centre-half

Youth career
- Holy Trinity Old Boys

Senior career*
| Years | Team | Apps | (Gls) |
| 1925–1927 | Southport | 17 | (5) |
| 1927–1937 | Everton | 193 | (66) |
| 1937–1938 | Northampton Town | 0 | (0) |
| 1938–1939 | New Brighton | 0 | (0) |

International career
| 1933 | England | 1 | (0) |
- * Club domestic league appearances and goals

Thomas Angus White (29 July 1908 – 13 August 1967) was an English footballer who started his career as a centre-forward before moving to centre-half, where he played for Everton in the 1933 FA Cup final as well as making one appearance for England.

== Football career ==
White was born in the Pendleton area of Salford and played his youth football for Holy Trinity Old Boys before joining Southport in 1925. He spent two seasons with the Third Division North club where his goals in the FA Cup matches against Blackburn Rovers (won 2–0) and Liverpool (lost 2–1) brought him to the attention of bigger clubs.

In the summer of 1927, he joined Everton of the First Division where he made his debut as a replacement for Dixie Dean on 22 October 1927, scoring twice in a 7–0 "rout" of West Ham United. This was his only appearance of the season as Everton went on to take the Football League title.

He remained at Everton for ten years, during which time they were relegated to the Second Division for the first time in the club's history before "bouncing back" to take the Football League title again in 1932 and winning the FA Cup in 1933.

Described as "a striker of exceptional versatility" who was "just as comfortable playing in defence as he was up front", White had a "direct style (which) endeared him to the supporters". White's versatility meant that during the 1928–29 season he was used as an occasional player, making 21 appearances with six goals, either as a half-back or forward as Everton struggled, finishing 18th in the table.

The following year, White became an established member of the side, missing only seven league matches, scoring 11 goals. On the final day of the season, Everton were one of five clubs in danger of relegation; Everton needed to win their final game, at home to Sunderland, with at least two of the other clubs losing. In front of a crowd of over 51,000 fans at Goodison Park, White scored his first hat-trick in a 4–1 victory; unfortunately for Everton, this was not enough as Burnley, Sheffield United, Grimsby Town and Newcastle United all won, and as a result Everton were relegated from the First Division for the first time since the foundation of the Football League.

Everton quickly regained their position in the top flight, running away with the Second Division title, although White made only ten appearances with ten goals. White soon made his mark back in the First Division, with a hat-trick in the second match of the season at Portsmouth's Fratton Park. He contributed 18 goals in 23 league appearances as Everton claimed the Football League title, a year after gaining promotion.

By now White was playing as a half-back rather than a forward and in the 1932–33 season he only scored twice from a total of 40 appearances as Everton finished mid-table in the league. They made up for this, however, by reaching the final of the FA Cup where they met Manchester City. In the final, played at Wembley Stadium on 29 April 1933, both teams, who normally played in blue shirts, were required to wear neutral colours with Everton in white and Manchester City in red; also for the first time in an FA Cup match, the players's shirts were numbered, with Everton wearing one to eleven and Manchester City wearing twelve to twenty-two. White played at centre-half, wearing No.5, in a match controlled by Everton, who won comfortably with goals from Jimmy Stein, Dixie Dean and Jimmy Dunn to claim their second FA Cup.

White's successes with Everton earned him a call-up to the England when, along with his Everton teammate Albert Geldard, he was one of six debutantes selected for the first-ever match between England and Italy. The match was played on 13 May 1933 at Rome's Stadio Nazionale PNF and ended in a 1–1 draw with goals from Giovanni Ferrari and Cliff Bastin. Like his fellow-debutante, Billy Furness, White was not selected for England again.

In the 1933–34 season, White scored 14 goals in 28 league appearances, including a hat-trick on 14 October 1933 in a 7–1 win over Blackburn Rovers.

White's Everton career came to an end in October 1937, ten years after his debut; in that time he had made a total of 204 appearances for the first-team, scoring 66 goals.

White then spent five months with Northampton Town followed by a move back to Merseyside with New Brighton. He made no Football League appearances for either club and retired at the end of the 1938–39 season.

== Later career ==
During World War II, White worked in Liverpool Docks, where he continued to work until he died following a fall in 1967.

== Honours ==
Everton

- Football League First Division: 1931–32
- Football League Second Division: 1930–31
- FA Cup: 1932–33
