= 1980–81 FA Vase =

Football Association Vase

Tournament details
- Country: England; Wales

Final positions
- Champions: Whickham
- Runners-up: Willenhall Town

The 1980–81 FA Vase was the seventh season of the FA Vase, an annual football competition for teams in the lower reaches of the English football league system.

Whickham, of Tyne and Wear, won the competition, beating Willenhall Town in the final.

== Third round ==
| Home team | Score | Away team |
|---|---|---|
| Almondsbury Greenway | 2–1 | Ottery St Mary |
| Anstey Nomads | 3–4 | Irthlingborough Diamonds |
| Beckenham Town | 3–2 | Ruislip Manor |
| Bowers United | 2–3 | Alma Swanley |
| Burgess Hill Town | 2–1 | Greenwich Borough |
| Burnham | 4–3 | Malden Vale |
| Congleton Town | 3–1 | Ossett Albion |
| Coventry Sporting | 1–0 | Shifnal Town |
| Felixstowe Town | 0–2 | Cheshunt |
| Friar Lane Old Boys | 4–3 | Newbury Town |
| Gorleston | 2–3 | Great Yarmouth Town |
| Guisborough Town | 0–1 | Whickham |
| Hallam | 1–0 | Denaby United |
| Harefield United | 0–5 | Pagham |
| Hornchurch | 0–5 | Basildon United |
| Hungerford Town | 4–1 | Port of Bristol |

| Home team | Score | Away team |
|---|---|---|
| Kempston Rovers | 1–1 | Sawbridgeworth Town |
| Kiveton Park | 1–0 | North Ferriby United |
| Leeds Ashley Road | 1–4 | Guiseley |
| Marlow | 1–4 | Whyteleafe |
| Norton Woodseats | 3–0 | Glossop |
| Rushden Town | 1–2 | Chipping Norton Town |
| Rylands | 0–1 | Middlewich Athletic |
| Salford | 2–1 | Staveley Works |
| Sholing Sports | 1–4 | Devizes Town |
| Southall | 1–2 | Cray Wanderers |
| Stamford | 3–2 | Skegness Town |
| Tadcaster Albion | 0–1 | Chester-le-Street Town |
| Thackley | 2–1 | Newcastle Blue Star |
| Wigston Fields | 1–1 | Lincoln United |
| Willenhall Town | 1–0 | Halesowen Town |
| Windsor & Eton | 6–0 | Egham Town |

| Home team | Score | Away team |
|---|---|---|
| Sawbridgeworth Town | 1–2 | Kempston Rovers |

| Home team | Score | Away team |
|---|---|---|
| Lincoln United | 3–4 | Wigston Fields |

== Fourth round ==
| Home team | Score | Away team |
|---|---|---|
| Salford | 0–2 | Whickham |
| Hallam | 3–0 | Chester-le-Street Town |
| Guiseley | 4–1 | Norton Woodseats |
| Thackley | 3–1 | Kiveton Park |
| Middlewich Athletic | 3–0 | Friar Lane Old Boys |
| Wigston Fields | 0–4 | Irthlingborough Diamonds |
| Coventry Sporting | 1–0 | Stamford |
| Willenhall Town | 1–0 | Congleton Town |

| Home team | Score | Away team |
|---|---|---|
| Great Yarmouth Town | 0–1 | Cray Wanderers |
| Cheshunt | 1–3 | Alma Swanley |
| Kempston Rovers | 2–1 | Burnham |
| Basildon United | 2–0 | Beckenham Town |
| Devizes Town | 2–1 | Chipping Norton Town |
| Hungerford Town | 3–0 | Burgess Hill Town |
| Whyteleafe | 2–1 | Pagham |
| Windsor & Eton | 4–1 | Almondsbury Greenway |

== Fifth round ==
| Home team | Score | Away team |
|---|---|---|
| Whickham | 2–0 | Thackley |
| Guiseley | 2–0 | Hallam |
| Willenhall Town | 2–0 | Middlewich Athletic |
| Alma Swanley | 2–0 | Coventry Sporting |

| Home team | Score | Away team |
|---|---|---|
| Hungerford Town | 0–1 | Windsor & Eton |
| Whyteleafe | 1–2 | Basildon United |
| Devizes Town | 2–1 | Kempston Rovers |
| Cray Wanderers | 0–0 | Irthlingborough Diamonds |

=== Replay ===
| Home team | Score | Away team |
|---|---|---|
| Irthlingborough Diamonds | 6–0 | Cray Wanderers |

== Quarter-finals ==
| Home team | Score | Away team |
|---|---|---|
| Basildon United | 0–0 | Irthlingborough Diamonds |
| Whickham | 3–0 | Devizes Town |

| Home team | Score | Away team |
|---|---|---|
| Alma Swanley | 2–2 | Windsor & Eton |
| Guiseley | 2–4 | Willenhall Town |

=== Replays ===
| Home team | Score | Away team |
|---|---|---|
| Irthlingborough Diamonds | 6–4 | Basildon United |

| Home team | Score | Away team |
|---|---|---|
| Windsor & Eton | 4–1 | Alma Swanley |

== Semi-finals ==
| Leg no | Home team | Score | Away team |
|---|---|---|---|
| 1st | Windsor & Eton | 1–1 | Whickham |
| 2nd | Whickham | 1–0 | Windsor & Eton |

Whickham won 2-1 on aggregate.

| Leg no | Home team | Score | Away team |
|---|---|---|---|
| 1st | Irthlingborough Diamonds | 1–1 | Willenhall Town |
| 2nd | Willenhall Town | 2–0 | Irthlingborough Diamonds |

Willenhall Town won 3–1 on aggregate.

== Final ==
25 April 1981
15:00

| Whickham | 3–2 | Willenhall Town |

Wembley Stadium, London
