= 1945–46 FA Cup qualifying rounds =

Tournament details
- Country: England; Wales

The 1945–46 FA Cup was the 65th season of the world's oldest football knockout competition; the Football Association Challenge Cup, or FA Cup for short. The large number of clubs entering the tournament from lower down the English football league system meant that the competition started with a number of preliminary and qualifying rounds. The 25 victorious teams from the fourth round qualifying progressed to the first round proper.

== Extra preliminary round ==
=== Ties ===
Tie	Home team	Score	Away team
1	Aylesbury United	5–0	Chesham United
2	Banbury Spencer	8–1	Headington United
3	Pressed Steel	1–0	Morris Motors
4	Uxbridge	11–1	Lyons Club

== Preliminary round ==
=== Ties ===
Tie	Home team	Score	Away team
1	Apsley	4–7	King's Langley
2	Aylesbury United	5–0	Osberton Radiator
3	Banstead Mental Hospital	0–2	Metropolitan Police
4	Chippenham Town	9–0	Devizes Town
5	East Grinstead	2–2	Horsham
6	Edgware Town	1–4	Barnet
7	Epsom	1–8	Woking
8	Harrow Town	8–0	Berkhamsted Town
9	Hayes	4–1	Maidenhead United
10	Hertford Town	3–6	Enfield
11	Hoddesdon Town	0–0	Bishop's Stortford
12	Hounslow Town	4–4	Slough United
13	Marlow	3–4	Yiewsley
14	Newbury Town	0–8	Banbury Spencer
15	Ossett Town	1–3	Thorne Colliery
16	Oxford City	4–0	Uxbridge
17	Pinner	1–2	Wealdstone
18	Purton	0–6	Swindon G W R Corinthians
19	Shildon	7–1	Usworth Colliery
20	St Albans City	4–3	Finchley
21	Tufnell Park	11–1	Welwyn Garden City
22	Windsor & Eton	11–1	Pressed Steel
23	Wycombe Wanderers	0–2	Southall
24	Sutton United	6–0	Guildford
25	Tooting & Mitcham United	5–2	Kingstonian
26	Thornycrofts	1–3	Totton

=== Replays ===
Tie	Home team	Score	Away team
5	Horsham	1–0	East Grinstead
11	Bishop's Stortford	4–1	Hoddesdon Town
12	Slough United	3–1	Hounslow Town

== 1st qualifying round ==
=== Ties ===
Tie	Home team	Score	Away team
1	Abbey United	0–8	Cambridge Town
2	Aberaman & Aberdare	6–1	Llanelli (Aberaman & Aberdare disqualified)
3	Annfield Plain	1–2	Ashington
4	Aylesbury United	1–2	Oxford City
5	Bangor City	4–1	Rhyl (Bangor City disqualified)
6	Barry Town	10–0	Clevedon
7	Bedford Avenue	0–0	Bedford Town
8	Blackhall Colliery Welfare	4–2	Seaham Colliery Welfare
9	Brodsworth Main Colliery	1–1	Firbeck Main Colliery
10	Chatteris Engineers	0–1	Newmarket Town
11	Clandown	0–1	Chippenham Town
12	Consett	6–0	Shankhouse
13	East Bierley	3–3	Thorne Colliery
14	East Cowes Victoria	9–1	Sandown
15	Ebbw Vale	3–1	Cardiff Corinthians (Ebbw Vale disqualified)
16	Enfield	8–1	Bishop's Stortford
17	Erith & Belvedere	3–3	Gravesend United
18	Eton Manor	1–1	Romford
19	Ferryhill Athletic	1–3	Shildon
20	Ford Sports (Dagenham)	4–2	Hoffman Athletic (Chelmsford)
21	Goole Town	0–1	Yorkshire Amateur
22	Gosforth & Coxlodge	0–2	Throckley
23	Grimethorpe Rovers	1–5	Denaby United
24	Guiseley	3–3	Frickley Colliery
25	Harrow Town	7–1	King's Langley
26	Hastings & St Leonards	w/o–scr	Bexhill Town
27	Hayes	1–1	Southall
28	Hednesford Town	2–2	Nuneaton Borough
29	Hereford United	0–8	Moor Green
30	Hitchin Town	3–2	Vauxhall Motors (Luton)
31	Horsham	4–3	Worthing
32	Hurst	9–2	Earle
33	Kettering Town	5–0	Peterborough Westwood Works
34	Leyland Motors	1–2	Skelmersdale United
35	Leyton	1–1	Grays Athletic
36	Meltham Mills	1–7	South Kirkby Colliery
37	Metropolitan Police	1–4	Woking
38	Monckton Athletic	6–2	Upton Colliery
39	Newburn	3–1	Amble
40	Newhaven	2–2	Haywards Heath
41	Northwich Victoria	0–4	Fodens Motor Works
42	Paulton Rovers	4–3	Swindon G W R Corinthians
43	Pewsey Y M	1–3	Trowbridge Town
44	Rawmarsh Welfare	3–1	Norton Woodseats
45	Redhill	1–5	Tooting & Mitcham United
46	Ryde Sports	1–3	Cowes
47	Salisbury Corinthians	2–6	Gosport Borough Athletic
48	Sheppey United	1–5	Bromley
49	Southwick	4–1	Bognor Regis Town
50	Spennymoor United	4–1	Tow Law Town
51	St Albans City	2–2	Wealdstone
52	Stanley United	5–0	West Auckland Town
53	Sutton United	7–0	Wimbledon
54	Tamworth	2–5	Bournville Athletic
55	Totton	0–4	Newport I O W
56	Tufnell Park	1–1	Barnet
57	Walton & Hersham	11–0	Epsom Town
58	Westbury United	4–3	Swindon Victoria
59	Windsor & Eton	0–3	Banbury Spencer
60	Witton Albion	8–2	Glossop
61	Woolwich Polytechnic	1–1	Lloyds (Sittingbourne)
62	Worcester City	8–0	Birmingham City Transport
63	Yiewsley	2–2	Slough United

=== Replays ===
Tie	Home team	Score	Away team
7	Bedford Town	0–4	Bedford Avenue
9	Firbeck Main Colliery	3–4	Brodsworth Main Colliery
13	Thorne Colliery	1–6	East Bierley
17	Gravesend United	2–1	Erith & Belvedere
18	Romford	4–3	Eton Manor
24	Frickley Colliery	7–0	Guiseley
27	Southall	2–1	Hayes
28	Nuneaton Borough	5–2	Hednesford Town
35	Grays Athletic	0–3	Leyton
40	Haywards Heath	5–0	Newhaven
51	Wealdstone	3–0	St Albans City
56	Barnet	3–1	Tufnell Park
61	Lloyds (Sittingbourne)	4–0	Woolwich Polytechnic
63	Slough United	2–2	Yiewsley

=== 2nd replay ===
Tie	Home team	Score	Away team
63	Slough United	2–0	Yiewsley

== 2nd qualifying round ==
=== Ties ===
Tie	Home team	Score	Away team
1	Ashington	1–1	Consett
2	Banbury Spencer	2–5	Slough United
3	Barnet	5–0	Enfield
4	Barry Town	6–1	Cardiff Corinthians
5	Bournville Athletic	6–5	Moor Green
6	Brodsworth Main Colliery	2–3	Denaby United
7	Bromley	2–0	Gravesend United
8	Cambridge Town	4–1	King's Lynn
9	Chorley	5–2	Wigan Athletic
10	Cowes	4–2	East Cowes Victoria
11	Darwen	2–2	Skelmersdale United
12	Grantham	6–1	Basford United
13	Harrow Town	1–1	Wealdstone
14	Hastings & St Leonards	6–1	Horsham
15	Haywards Heath	5–1	Southwick
16	Hitchin Town	0–2	Bedford Avenue
17	Letchworth Town	3–0	Leighton United
18	Leyton	6–2	Ford Sports (Dagenham)
19	Llanelli	7–0	Monmouth Town
20	Milnthorpe Corinthians	4–5	Kells Welfare Centre
21	Newport I O W	2–0	Gosport Borough Athletic
22	Nuneaton Borough	1–0	Worcester City
23	Ollerton Colliery	4–2	Boston United
24	Oxford City	2–1	Southall
25	Paulton Rovers	4–0	Westbury United
26	Ramsgate Athletic	3–3	Lloyds (Sittingbourne)
27	Rawmarsh Welfare	2–1	Monckton Athletic
28	Rhyl	5–1	Fodens Motor Works
29	Romford	7–1	Crittall Athletic
30	Rushden Town	1–9	Peterborough United
31	Shildon	6–1	Blackhall Colliery Welfare
32	South Kirkby Colliery	0–2	Frickley Colliery
33	Spennymoor United	6–1	Stanley United
34	Stockton	4–0	Whitby United
35	Sutton United	4–0	Walton & Hersham
36	Throckley	0–0	Newburn
37	Trowbridge Town	3–1	Chippenham Town
38	Wellingborough Town	2–5	Kettering Town
39	Welton Rovers	3–7	Peasedown Miners Welfare
40	Wisbech Town	5–0	Newmarket Town
41	Witton Albion	6–1	Hurst
42	Woking	1–2	Tooting & Mitcham United
43	Yorkshire Amateur	3–0	East Bierley
44	Billingham Synthonia	Bye	
45	Coalville Town	Bye	
46	Gresley Rovers	Bye	
47	Leiston	Bye	
48	Lowestoft Town	Bye	
49	Lysaghts Sports	Bye	
50	Netherfield	Bye	
51	Radstock Town	Bye	
52	Scunthorpe & Lindsey United	Bye	

=== Replays ===
Tie	Home team	Score	Away team
1	Consett	3–0	Ashington
11	Skelmersdale United	2–3	Darwen
13	Wealdstone	6–1	Harrow Town
26	Lloyds (Sittingbourne)	3–1	Ramsgate Athletic
36	Newburn	1–2	Throckley

== 3rd qualifying round ==
=== Ties ===
Tie	Home team	Score	Away team
1	Barnet	3–0	Wealdstone
2	Bedford Avenue	1–0	Letchworth Town
3	Chorley	1–0	Darwen
4	Frickley Colliery	0–4	Yorkshire Amateur
5	Grantham	2–1	Ollerton Colliery
6	Gresley Rovers	0–7	Coalville Town
7	Haywards Heath	1–0	Hastings & St Leonards
8	Kells Welfare Centre	1–2	Netherfield
9	Kettering Town	2–1	Peterborough United
10	Leiston	2–2	Lowestoft Town (Lowestoft Town disqualified)
11	Llanelli	1–7	Barry Town
12	Lloyds (Sittingbourne)	3–4	Bromley
13	Newport I O W	0–1	Cowes (Cowes disqualified)
14	Nuneaton Borough	8–1	Bournville Athletic (Nuneaton Borough disqualified)
15	Peasedown Miners Welfare	7–0	Radstock Town
16	Rawmarsh Welfare	5–1	Denaby United
17	Rhyl	2–2	Witton Albion
18	Romford	4–1	Leyton
19	Scunthorpe & Lindsey United	4–1	Lysaghts Sports
20	Shildon	3–2	Spennymoor United
21	Slough United	3–1	Oxford City
22	Stockton	4–1	Billingham Synthonia
23	Throckley	2–4	Consett
24	Tooting & Mitcham United	3–3	Sutton United
25	Trowbridge Town	7–0	Paulton Rovers
26	Wisbech Town	3–1	Cambridge Town

=== Replays ===
Tie	Home team	Score	Away team
17	Witton Albion	3–1	Rhyl
24	Sutton United	5–1	Tooting & Mitcham United

== 4th qualifying round ==
The teams entering the competition in this round are: Ilford, Lovells Athletic, Shorts Sports, Chelmsford City, Cheltenham Town, Dulwich Hamlet, Gillingham, Guildford City, Leytonstone, Lancaster City, Gainsborough Trinity, Scarborough, North Shields, Shrewsbury Town, Stalybridge Celtic, Runcorn, Walthamstow Avenue, Clapton, Wellington Town, Kidderminster Harriers, Willington, Colchester United, Marine and Workington.

=== Ties ===
Tie	Home team	Score	Away team
1	Barnet	5–2	Ilford
2	Barry Town	1–5	Lovells Athletic
3	Bromley	2–0	Shorts Sports
4	Chelmsford City	9–0	Leiston
5	Cheltenham Town	1–1	Peasedown Miners Welfare
6	Consett	2–3	Stockton
7	Dulwich Hamlet	1–2	Romford
8	Gillingham	3–9	Sutton United
9	Guildford City	1–2	Newport I O W
10	Grantham	6–1	Bedford Avenue
11	Kettering Town	2–1	Coalville Town
12	Leytonstone	3–3	Slough United
13	Netherfield	2–0	Lancaster City
14	Rawmarsh Welfare	1–3	Gainsborough Trinity
15	Scarborough	2–4	North Shields
16	Scunthorpe & Lindsey United	1–2	Yorkshire Amateur
17	Shrewsbury Town	6–2	Bournville Athletic
18	Stalybridge Celtic	3–0	Runcorn
19	Trowbridge Town	6–0	Haywards Heath
20	Walthamstow Avenue	4–0	Clapton
21	Wellington Town	5–2	Kidderminster Harriers
22	Willington	3–2	Shildon
23	Wisbech Town	5–0	Colchester United
24	Witton Albion	2–3	Marine
25	Workington	1–2	Chorley

=== Replays ===
Tie	Home team	Score	Away team
5	Peasedown Miners Welfare	0–1	Cheltenham Town
12	Slough United	3–1	Leytonstone

== 1945–46 FA Cup ==
See 1945–46 FA Cup for details of the rounds from the first round proper onwards.
