= 1933 FA Cup final =

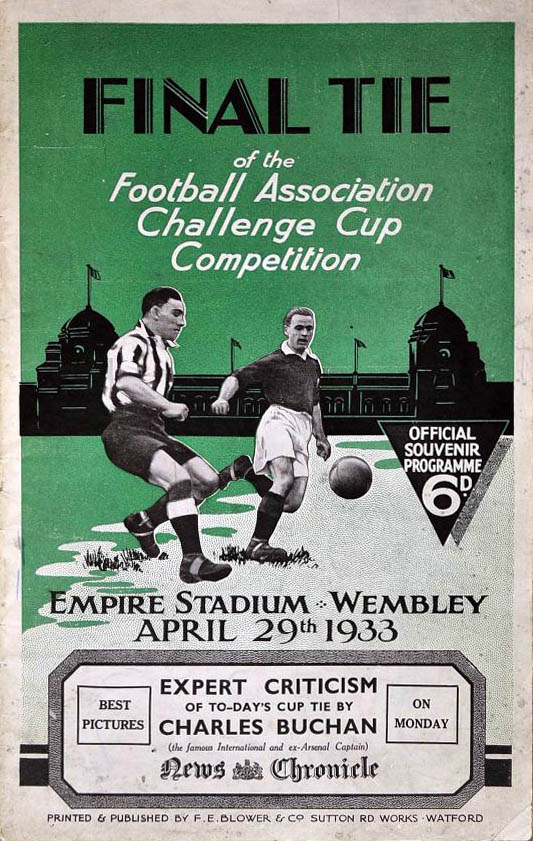
- Official programme
- Event: 1932–33 FA Cup
Everton	Manchester City
3	0
- Date: 29 April 1933
- Venue: Wembley Stadium, London
- Referee: E. Wood (Sheffield)
- Attendance: 92,950

The 1933 FA Cup final was a football match between Everton and Manchester City on 29 April 1933 at Wembley Stadium in London. The deciding match of English football's primary cup competition, the Football Association Challenge Cup (better known as the FA Cup), it was the 62nd final, and the 11th at Wembley. The 1933 final was the first where the players, including goalkeepers, were issued numbers for identification. Everton were allocated numbers 1–11 and Manchester City numbers 12–22.

Each team progressed through five rounds to reach the final. Everton won the game 3–0, with goals from Jimmy Stein, Dixie Dean and James Dunn, winning the cup for the first time since 1906.

== Route to the final ==
=== Everton ===
Round	Opposition	Score
3rd	Leicester City (a)	3–2
4th	Bury (h)	2–0
5th	Leeds United (h)	4–2
6th	Luton Town (h)	6–0
Semi-final	West Ham United (n)	2–1

Both teams entered the competition in the third round, the entry point for First Division clubs. Everton were drawn to play Leicester City at Filbert Street, an all First Division tie. The match was close; Dixie Dean scored for Everton after three minutes, but Leicester quickly levelled the score. A goal by Jimmy Stein gave Everton a 2–1 half-time lead, but Leicester again equalised. James Dunn eventually scored to secure a 3–2 win for Everton. Second Division Bury provided the opposition in the fourth round. Tommy Johnson scored twice for Everton in the opening half-hour. From that point, though Bury enjoyed significant spells of possession, Everton thwarted their efforts by preying on Bury mistakes. In the second half Dean added a third goal from a rebounded Cliff Britton free-kick, and Bury scored a late consolation goal. Everton were drawn to play Leeds United at home in the fifth round. Leeds' strong league form meant Everton entered the match as slight underdogs despite home advantage. Everton goalkeeper Ted Sagar made two important saves in the first half to deny Arthur Hydes and Billy Furness. Everton the gained the upper hand and scored twice, Dean with the first, and Stein with the second, direct from a corner.

Against Third Division Luton Town in the quarter-final, Everton won comfortably. The match remained scoreless for half an hour, but after Stein opened the scoring for Everton the match became one-sided, and ended 6–0. Stein and Johnson both scored twice, along with a goal each for Dunn and Dean, the latter maintaining his record of scoring in every round. By this time Everton were viewed as favourites to win the competition. In the semi-final they played West Ham at Molineux, Wolverhampton. Everton took the lead in the sixth minute. A corner kick by Stein was headed on by Johnson, and then headed into the net by Dunn. Everton had the better of the play in the first half, but Vic Watson scored for West Ham just before half-time. In the second half West Ham's Woods missed an open goal from six yards (5.5m). Everton then capitalised on their reprieve. With seven minutes remaining, a mistake by Jim Barrett allowed Edward Critchley to go clear on goal and score the winner.

=== Manchester City ===
Round	Opposition	Score
3rd	Gateshead (a)	1–1
3rd	Gateshead (h)	9–0
4th	Walsall (h)	2–0
5th	Bolton Wanderers (a)	4–2
6th	Burnley (a)	1–0
Semi-final	Derby County (n)	3–2

Manchester City started the competition at Third Division Gateshead. Despite the disparity in league positions, a heavy pitch made for an even game, which finished 1–1. The replay at Maine Road was one-sided. A 9–0 Manchester City win featured six different scorers, including a hat-trick from Fred Tilson. In the fourth round Manchester City faced another Third Division side, Walsall, who had provided the surprise result of the third round by defeating league leaders Arsenal. Brook scored both goals in a 2–0 win, in which Walsall's Reed was sent off for a foul on Brook. The fifth round brought a short trip to Bolton Wanderers, where the attendance of 69,920 was the highest of the round. Bolton took the lead, but Brook scored twice in quick succession to give Manchester City the advantage at the interval. Bolton equalised when a gust of wind caught Ray Westwood's corner. Brook completed a hat trick with a penalty to regain the lead, and in the closing minutes Tilson completed a 4–2 victory. The Manchester Guardian suggested Brook's "magnificent display" made him a contender for an England call-up.

Manchester City's quarter-final was against Burnley of the Second Division. City took the lead early in the match following a solo goal by Tilson. In the second-half Burnley discarded their passing game in favour of a direct approach, and pressured the Manchester City goal. The City defence stood firm, and the match finished 1–0. City's opponents for the semi-final, held at Leeds Road, Huddersfield, were Derby County. Derby had two chances to score in the first half, but both were missed. A Manchester City counter-attack produced the opening goal, when Brook crossed and Toseland headed in. By midway through the second half Manchester City led by three goals. The second was scored by Tilson, a follow-up after an initial saved shot. McMullan scored the third after dribbling through the Derby defence. Derby mounted a late comeback. A goal by Howard Fabian reduced the deficit to two, and Sammy Crooks added a late second for Derby, but it was too late to affect the result of the match, which ended 3–2.

== Build-up ==
Everton had contested the final on four previous occasions. They beat Newcastle United 1–0 to win the Cup in 1906, but were defeated in the 1893, 1897 and 1907 finals. The 1933 final was Manchester City's third. Both their previous finals were against Bolton Wanderers. Manchester City won by a goal to nil in 1904, and lost by the same scoreline in 1926. Both teams had performed well in the previous season. Manchester City reached the semi-finals of the 1932 FA Cup; Everton were reigning league champions. The clubs had never previously met in cup competition. The league matches between the two earlier in the season each finished as a win for the home team. At the time of the final, Everton's league position was tenth, and Manchester City's sixteenth. Newspapers did not declare a clear favourite for the win. Everton were viewed as having the more skilful players, particularly their forwards, whereas Manchester City were seen as having greater strength and determination.

Everton spent the week before the match in the spa town of Buxton, and travelled to Dorking on the eve of the match. Manchester City spent the week in Bushey. Everton's James Dunn received treatment on a thigh injury in the ten days preceding the game, but was anticipated to be fit enough to play. Manchester City's main injury worry was Fred Tilson, who was troubled by a leg injury. Dunn was passed fit well before the game, allowing Everton to field the same line-up that played in four of their five previous cup ties.

Ten miles (16 km) of barbed wire was used to secure Wembley Stadium against unauthorised entry. The pre-match entertainment was music by the Band of the Irish Guards, and communal singing backed by the band of the Royal Horse Guards. Inclement weather prevented the attendance of King George V. Instead the guest of honour was the Duke of York. Other guests present included Baron Wigram, Admiral Sir Lionel Halsey, Austrian envoy Baron von Franckenstein and the West Indies cricket team.

The Manchester City line-up contained two survivors from the 1926 team, Sam Cowan and Jimmy McMullan. The only Everton player with cup final experience was Tommy Johnson, who also played for Manchester City in the 1926 final. He represented the Manchester club between 1919 and 1930, and at the time of the 1933 final was Manchester City's all-time highest goalscorer.

Both teams usually wore blue, causing a colour clash. The competition rules required both teams to wear alternative colours. For the first time in a cup final, the players wore numbered shirts. Everton were numbered 1–11, and Manchester City 12–22. Everton goalkeeper Sagar wore 1, with the forwards bearing the higher numbers. Manchester City were the reverse. Forward Brook wore 12, through to goalkeeper Langford who wore 22.

== Match ==
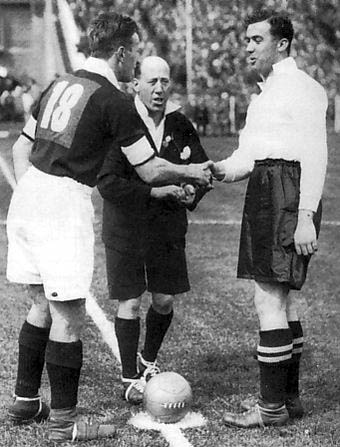
Sam Cowan (18) and Dixie Dean, captains of Manchester City and Everton, before the match

Each team played the formation typical of the era: two full-backs, three half-backs and five forwards. With Tilson absent from the Manchester City line-up, Alec Herd moved across to Tilson's usual centre-forward position, and Bobby Marshall was selected at inside-right. For Everton, Albert Geldard who was injured for the semi-final was selected at outside right, and Ted Critchley who scored the winning goal in the FA Cup semi-final, was left out of the side.

Manchester City had the first attack of the match, but it came to nothing. Soon Everton began to dominate the match, with Dean frequently involved in the attacking play. Several Everton attacks came on their left flank. Stein caused Manchester City right-back Sid Cann problems, and Cann was forced to concede a corner kick on several occasions. Just after the half-hour Everton had their first shot on target, when Stein's effort was saved by Langford. Another chance quickly arrived. Stein's cross passed in front of goal, but Dean was unable to connect with the ball. Two minutes later Manchester City goalkeeper Langford attempted to catch a cross from Britton, but dropped the ball under pressure from Dean. The ball fell into the path of Stein, who put the ball into the empty net to give Everton the lead. At half-time Everton led 1–0.

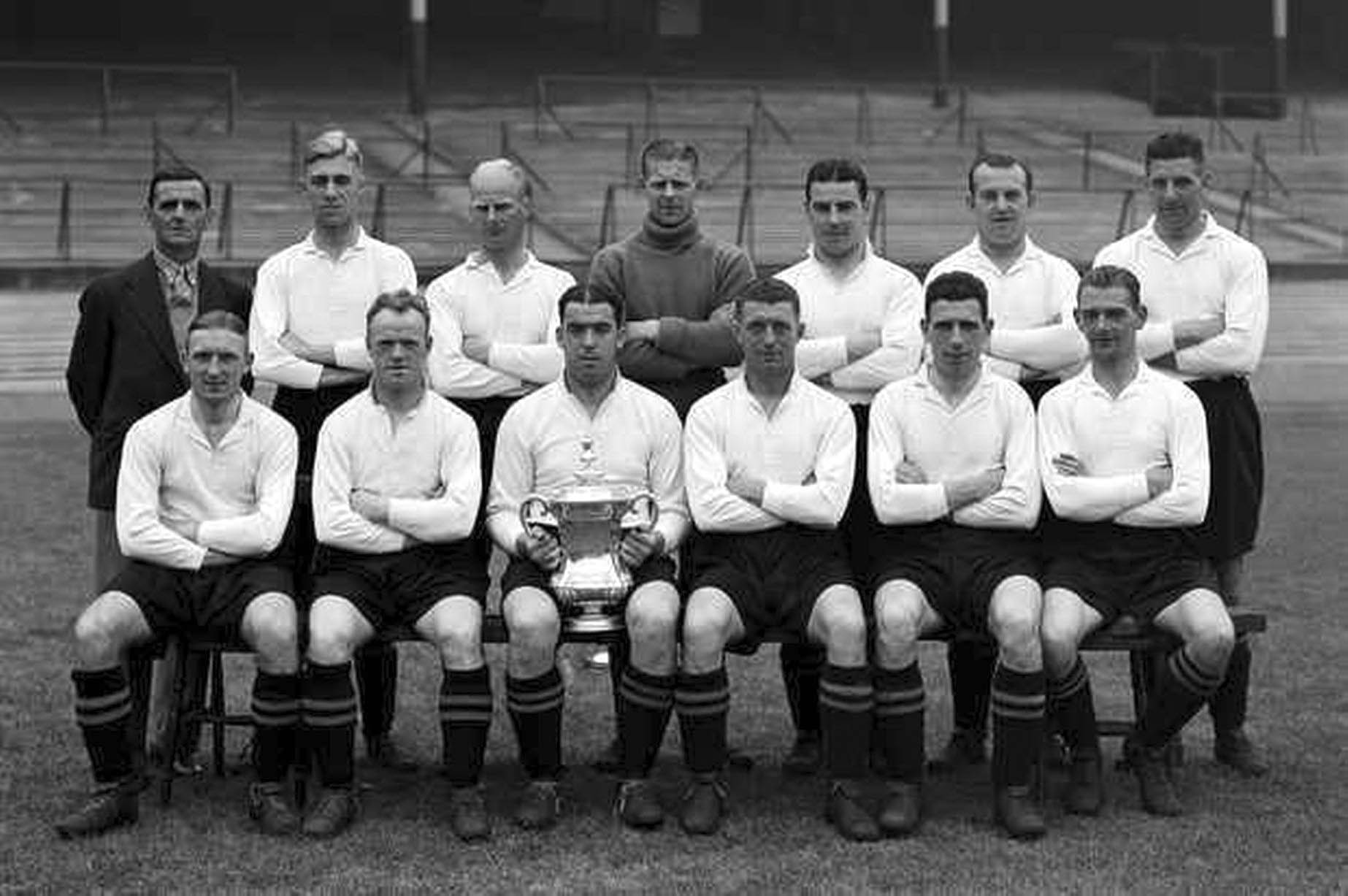
Everton players posing with the Cup

Everton continued to control the game in the second half. Manchester City took shots from long range, but none required Sagar to make a save. Seven minutes into the second half, Langford again failed to catch a Britton cross, and Dean charged to the net. Dean, ball and goalkeeper all landed in the goal, making the score 2–0. Manchester City then made a few fruitless attacks. As was the case throughout the game, the Everton defence outplayed the Manchester City forwards. The Manchester Guardian singled out Warney Cresswell for particular praise, describing his performance as "an almost perfect display". Ten minutes from time a Dunn header from a corner made the score 3–0 to Everton. Just before the end Everton's Johnson had a chance to make it 4–0, but the referee blew his whistle for full-time before Johnson could take his shot.

== Match details ==
29 April 1933
15:00 BST

Everton	3–0	Manchester City
Stein 41'; Dean 52'; Dunn 80'	Report

Wembley Stadium, London
Attendance: 92,950
Referee: Eddie Wood

Everton	Manchester City

GK	1	(England) Ted Sagar
DF	2	(Northern Ireland) Billy Cook
DF	3	(England) Warney Cresswell
MF	4	(England) Cliff Britton
MF	5	(England) Tommy White
MF	6	(Scotland) Jock Thomson
FW	7	(England) Albert Geldard
FW	8	(Scotland) James Dunn
FW	9	(England) Dixie Dean (c)
FW	10	(England) Tommy Johnson
FW	11	(Scotland) Jimmy Stein
Manager: (England) Thomas H. McIntosh

GK	22	(England) Len Langford
DF	21	(England) Sid Cann
DF	20	(England) Bill Dale
MF	19	(Scotland) Matt Busby
MF	18	(England) Sam Cowan(c)
MF	17	(England) Jackie Bray
FW	16	(England) Ernie Toseland
FW	15	(England) Bobby Marshall
FW	14	(Scotland) Alec Herd
FW	13	(Scotland) Jimmy McMullan
FW	12	(England) Eric Brook
Manager:
(England) Wilf Wild

== Post-match ==
Everton captain Dixie Dean led his team to the Royal Box and received the cup from the Duke of York. Everton returned to Liverpool on the Monday evening, and paraded the city in the same horse-drawn carriage used in the celebrations of their previous cup win in 1906. The players attended a reception at the town hall, where large crowds greeted them. After the reception the cup was taken to Goodison Park for public viewing.

Newsreels of the final featured post-match toasts by the two captains. First Dixie Dean, raising his glass, said "Here's to Lancashire, and may the cup stay in Lancashire. If Everton don't win it, may another Lancashire club win it." Cowan replied "I hope the next Lancashire club that wins it is Manchester City, my club". The following year's final made the captains' remarks look perceptive. Cowan and his Manchester City team returned, and beat Portsmouth 2–1 to win the 1934 cup. Both Manchester City and Everton also went on to win the league championship later in the decade; Manchester City in 1937, and Everton in 1939.
