= Walter Harrison =

Walter Harrison may refer to:

- Walter Harrison (politician), British politician
- Walter Harrison (university administrator), President of the University of Hartford
- Walter Harrison (footballer), English footballer
