= Jack Sheffield (footballer) =

English footballer

Personal information
- Full name: John Davenport Sheffield
- Date of birth: 1879
- Place of birth: Coalville, England
- Date of death: 13 March 1915 (aged 35–36)
- Place of death: Neuve-Chapelle, France
- Position: Outside right

Senior career*
Years	Team	Apps	(Gls)
- Coalville Albion
- Whitwick White Cross
- Coalville Town
- Coalville Wednesday
1902–1903	Burton United	12	(0)
- Coalville Town
1904–1905	Leicester Fosse	2	(0)
- Loughborough Corinthians
- Ibstock Albion
- Coalville Excelsior
- Ibstock Albion
- Coalville Wednesday
- Coalville Town
- Coalville Swifts
- * Club domestic league appearances and goals

John Davenport Sheffield (1879 – 13 March 1915) was an English amateur footballer who played in the Football League for Burton United and Leicester Fosse as an outside right.

== Personal life ==
Sheffield apprenticed as an architect and surveyor and as of 1911 was assisting his family in the running of the Railway Hotel, Coalville. He served as a corporal in the Leicestershire Regiment (later the Royal Leicestershire Regiment) during the Second Boer War. He later rejoined the regiment soon after the outbreak of the First World War in August 1914. On 13 March 1915, while serving with the 2nd Battalion of the regiment, Sheffield was shot in the head and killed by a sniper on the final day of the Battle of Neuve Chapelle. He is commemorated on the Le Touret Memorial.

== Career statistics ==
Appearances and goals by club, season and competition
Club	Season	League			FA Cup		Total	
Club	Season	Division	Apps	Goals	Apps	Goals	Apps	Goals
Leicester Fosse	1904–05	Second Division	2	0	0	0	2	0
Career total			2	0	0	0	2	0
