= Coalville Town F.C. (1936) =

Defunct association football club from Leicestershire

- Full name: Coalville Town Football Club
- Nickname: the Spiders
- Founded: 1936
- Dissolved: 1954
- Ground: Waggon & Horses
Home colours

Coalville Town F.C. was an association football club from Coalville, Leicestershire, active in the mid-20th century.

== History ==
The club was founded on 8 May 1936 at a meeting at the Baths Hall, as an amateur affair, mostly made up of miners. It started its competitive career in the 1936–37 season in the Central Amateur League; nearly a thousand fans watched the club beat Coventry Morris Motors 2–1 in its first match, right-back Reg Morris scoring both goals from the penalty spot.

The club entered the FA Amateur Cup from 1937–38 to 1947–48, its best run being to the last 32 in 1946–47, losing 3–2 at Tow Law Town, having been two goals ahead inside the first quarter-of-an-hour. It entered the FA Cup qualifying for the first time in 1938–39 and was a regular entrant until 1954–55. Its best run came in 1945–46, when it reached the fourth and final qualifying round, albeit only having won one tie (7–0 at Gresley Rovers). At the final qualifying stage, it went down 2–1 at Kettering Town - the Spiders took the lead within half-a-minute, but Kettering equalized straight from kick-off.

The club won the Leicestershire Senior League twice, the first time, in 1945–46, securing the title with a game to go, in an unusual 9–6 win over Gresley Rovers. It took its second triumph in 1948–49 in a closer race; needing to win the final match at Atherstone for the title, Town took the lead inside five minutes, and ran out 6–1 winners.

It never won the Leicestershire and Rutland Senior Cup, being runner-up in 1945–46 and 1950–51. It lost the 1946 final 5–1 to Leicester City reserves, in front of 2,000 at the Waggon & Horses ground, despite taking the lead. The 1951 final against Ibstock Penistone Rovers went to a replay at the Whitwick Colliery ground, but Ibstock scored the only goal from a second half penalty. Leading scorer Sam Richards' brace left him on 49 for the season.

The club had tentatively approached Whitwick Colliery - which was in the Birmingham League - in April 1950, with regard to a merger, and although these talks went nowhere, Town quit the Leicestershire league before the 1950–51 season, joining the higher status Central Alliance League instead. The standard however proved too high for the team, and it struggled near the foot of the table for four seasons.

Town came to a crashing halt in 1954. After a drop of £300 in gate money in the 1953–54 season, the club announced its intention to disband, and resigned from the Central Alliance. There was an attempt to rescue the club, and an entry was made to the second division of the Leicestershire Senior League for 1954–55, but, after winning its first two matches, it began to struggle; the rushed and late recruitment of new players had resulted in the club signing players from lower grade amateur football, and most of them soon left for clubs at the level from which they had come. After a 14–0 FA Cup qualifying round hammering at Whitwick Colliery, with goalkeeper Thornley praised for keeping the score below thirty, and a 17–1 League destruction at the hands of Oakham Imperial in October, the club "put up the shutters".

== Colours ==
The club wore black and white hooped shirts. These were the colours of Queen's Park F.C., one of whose former players - Dr Forsyth - was the club's first chairman, and the club agreed at its first meeting to secure "distinctive jerseys, which will be designed with a view to reproducing the spirit of amateur football". Dr Forsyth's suggestion of black and white was chosen, with red and white as change colours.

== Ground ==
The club played at the Waggon and Horses Ground, as had its Coalville Town predecessors.

== Nickname ==
The club was nicknamed the Spiders, which, like the colours, is also that of Queen's Park.

== Notable players ==
- Walter Harrison (footballer)
- Dennis Cheney, outside-left, who played for the club pre-war and for Leicester City during and after it, joining Bournemouth & Boscome in 1949, after a loan spell with Watford
- Stan Baines, winger, who joined Leicester in 1937.
