= Brush Sports F.C. =

Brush Sports
- Full name: Brush Sports Football Club
- Nickname: the Brush
- Founded: 1918
- Dissolved: 1960
- Ground: Brown's Lane
- League: 1918 to 1921, 1934 to 1947 Leicestershire Senior League; 1947 to 1948 United Counties League; 1948 to 1960 Birmingham and District League
Home colours

Brush Sports F.C., previously known as Loughborough Brush F.C. was an English association football club which participated in the Leicestershire Senior League and the FA Cup.

== History ==
The Brush Electrical Engineering Works' Sports Club was founded in 1918, and its football side was initially known as Loughborough Brush. The club was variously known as Loughborough Brush Sports and more simply Brush Sports into the 1940s.

The club was particularly strong around World War 2, as the works was able to recruit many footballers for war work. It won the Leicestershire Senior League in 1936–37 and 1940–41, and won the Leicestershire and Rutland Senior Cup five times, all in the 1940s. In 1946, the club decided to expand from a purely works team, by recruiting semi-professional players alongside works staff, although the club was still run by a company committee.

The club also reached the first round of the FA Cup in 1946–47 (hammering Shrewsbury Town 5–1 in the qualifiers - a major shock result, one of the Shrews directors admitting he had never even heard of the Brush) and 1951–52, on the second occasion leading Weymouth at half-time but conceding a 77th minute winner in a 3–2 defeat.

The club's final season was 1959–60, in which it finished a creditable 9th (out of 18) in the Birmingham and District League. However, the club was a financial mess, with manager Alf Rogers resigning in January 1960, and the club committee and supporters agreed to set up a new club at the end of the season, to represent the town as a whole. At the start of February, the new club was christened Loughborough United, the new club to be run as a combined supporter/company club for the 1960–61 season, and afterwards as a "town" club.

== Colours ==
The club's traditional colours were blue shirts and white shorts, although in its later years the shirts had white sleeves. In the immediate post-war period the club wore blue and white quarters.

It adopted numbered shirts in the 1945–46 season, being only the second amateur side to do so.

== Ground ==
The club originally played at the Brush factory in Forest Road, and in 1937 moved to Brown's Lane, the former home of Loughborough Corinthians. The highest recorded crowd was 8,000, for the FA Cup first round tie with Southend United on 30 November 1946.

== Notable players ==
- Notable players ( 6 )
- Ken Oliver: Started his career at Brush Sports before playing for Sunderland, Derby County and Exeter City
- Bill Farmer: Joined Brush Sports in 1951 after six seasons at Nottingham Forest, before signing for Oldham Athletic in 1957
