= Jock Scott =

Jock Scott may refer to:

- Jock Scott (rugby union) (1887–1967), Scottish rugby union player
- Jock Scott (footballer) (1906–1981), Scottish footballer
- Jock Scott (politician) (1947–2009), American politician
- Jock Scott (1817–?), creator of the Jock Scott fly

== See also ==
- Jock Scot (1952–2016), Scottish poet and recording artist
- John Scott (disambiguation)
