= Albert Geldard =

English footballer

Personal information
- Date of birth: 11 April 1914
- Place of birth: Bradford, Yorkshire, England
- Date of death: 19 October 1989 (aged 75)
- Height: 5 ft 7 in (1.70 m)
- Position: Outside right

Youth career
- Bradford Schools
- Manningham Mills

Senior career*
| Years | Team | Apps | (Gls) |
| 1928–1932 | Bradford Park Avenue | 34 | (6) |
| 1932–1938 | Everton | 180 | (38) |
| 1938–1939 | Bolton Wanderers | 20 | (1) |
| 1946 | Darwen | | |
| 1946–1947 | Bolton Wanderers | 9 | (1) |
| Total | | 243 | (46) |

International career
| 1933–1937 | England | 4 | (0) |
- * Club domestic league appearances and goals

Albert Geldard (11 April 1914 – 19 October 1989) was an English professional footballer who played as an outside right for Bradford Park Avenue, Everton, Bolton Wanderers and Darwen. At Everton he won the FA Cup Final in 1933. He made four appearances for England during 1933–1937. At Bradford Park Avenue; he became known as the youngest player to appear in the Football League, a distinction shared jointly with Ken Roberts until Reuben Noble-Lazarus took the record in 2008.

== Playing career ==
=== Bradford Park Avenue ===
Geldard was born at Bradford, Yorkshire and played his youth football with Bradford Schools and Manningham Mills. Magic was one of Geldard's hobbies, with toffeeweb referring to the winger as "a real wizard, both on and off the pitch. His hobbies included magic tricks and he was one of the trickiest right wingers ever seen: he was devastatingly fast and he had a trick-bag that seemingly never ran out." He joined Bradford Park Avenue as a professional in 1928.

His debut came at The Den on 16 September 1929 against Millwall to become the youngest player to appear in the Football League at just 15 years and 158 days old. He left Bradford Park Avenue having scored six goals in 34 games; signing for Everton on 14 November 1932 for a then record fee of £4,000.

=== Everton ===
Joining Everton, his debut came against Middlesbrough where he scored a goal. Geldard formed a duet with striker Tommy Lawton, by producing good crosses for him to head home. Tony Matthews described Geldard as; "Geldard was a slippery customer who possessed an exceptional turn of speed, could shoot with both feet and enjoyed taking on opponents, either on the outside or inside." Taking part in the cup-tie of the century on 30 January 1935, Geldard scored two goals to help Everton progress into the fifth round of the 1935 FA Cup after the 6–4 defeat of Sunderland.

Geldard was part of the Everton side that won the 1933 FA Cup Final with a 3–0 win over Manchester City at Wembley with goals from Jimmy Stein, Dixie Dean and James Dunn; with Geldard crossing in for the third goal. Tommy Lawton was disappointed at the trade of Geldard saying; "He was the fastest thing on two legs over ten yards. We had other wingers like Torry Gillick, Wally Boyes and Jimmy Caskie, but Albert had played for England only the season before, when he'd kept Stan Matthews out of the team. I thought we'd miss him." In total Geldard had made 140 appearances for Everton scoring 38 goals.

=== Bolton Wanderers ===
Bolton Wanderers signed Geldard for £4,500 in July 1938, and his debut came against Charlton Athletic on 27 August 1938 and scored his first goal for The Trotters on 18 February 1939 against his former club Everton. He enlisted in the 53rd (Bolton) Field Regiment, Royal Artillery, in May 1939 to fight in the Second World War along with 14 of his Bolton teammates.

=== Darwen ===
He returned from the war with an agreement with Bolton for him to play on semi professional terms for Darwen and played a few games for the Lancashire-based club, after World War II, Geldard returned to play for Bolton in 1946 and played nine games scoring a single goal, but was forced to retire from football after a knee injury in 1947.

== International career ==
He made his debut for England on 13 May 1933 at the age of 19 against Italy in a 1–1 draw at Stadio Nazionale PNF, making him the 10th youngest player to ever appear for England; at this time he was playing at Everton, going onto make four appearances for England in total in games against; Switzerland, Scotland and Northern Ireland.

=== International appearances ===
| # | Date | Venue | Opponent | Score | Result | Competition |
|---|---|---|---|---|---|---|
| 1. | 13 May 1933 | Stadio Nazionale PNF, Rome, Italy | Italy | 1–1 | Draw | Friendly |
| 2. | 29 May 1933 | Sportplatz Neufeld, Bern, Switzerland | Switzerland | 0–4 | Win | Friendly |
| 3. | 6 April 1935 | Hampden Park, Glasgow, Scotland | Scotland | 2–0 | Loss | British Home Championship |
| 4. | 23 October 1937 | Windsor Park, Belfast, Northern Ireland | Northern Ireland | 1–5 | Win | British Home Championship |

== Honours ==
Everton

- FA Cup: 1932–33
