= Ken Oliver (footballer) =

English footballer

Personal information
- Full name: James Henry Kenneth Oliver
- Date of birth: 10 August 1924
- Place of birth: Loughborough, England
- Date of death: 13 May 1994 (aged 69)
- Place of death: Derby, England
- Position: Defender

Senior career*
Years	Team	Apps	(Gls)
1945–1946	Brush Sports		
1946–1949	Sunderland	8	(1)
1949–1958	Derby County	184	(1)
1958–1960	Exeter City	92	(0)
- * Club domestic league appearances and goals

James Henry Kenneth Oliver (10 August 1924 – 13 May 1994) was an English professional footballer who played as a defender, most notably for Derby County.

== Career ==
=== Early career ===
Having started his career with Brush Sports, Oliver played for Sunderland during the late 1940s.

=== Derby County ===
Oliver joined Derby in September 1949 from Sunderland, from where he had made several occasional appearances in league football. His senior Derby debut came in October that year. He became a regular first choice centre-back for the club, where he remained until the 1954–55 season, when he played just nine times. During his latter years with Derby County, Oliver was interviewed in November 1957 by board directors from Burton Albion, who were considering appointing him as a player-manager. Derby said they would release Oliver with their blessing for only a nominal fee, should he secure the role.

=== Exeter City ===
Oliver signed for Exeter City in January 1958, becoming the first signing of new manager Frank Broome, whom he had previously worked with at Derby County. The transfer fee was reported as being a four-figure sum.

== Retirement ==
After retiring from football following his exit from Exeter City, there were rumours that Oliver may be joining Chesterfield, however he refuted the rumours, suggesting that he intended to take up coaching and continue playing golf.
