= Jackie Belton =

English footballer

Personal information
- Full name: John Belton
- Date of birth: 1 May 1895
- Place of birth: Loughborough, England
- Date of death: 1952 (aged 56–57)
- Height: 5 ft 8 in (1.73 m)
- Positions: Right half; centre forward

Senior career*
Years	Team	Apps	(Gls)
- Quorn Emmanuel
–1914	Loughborough Corinthians		
1914–1928	Nottingham Forest	322	(16)
- Loughborough Corinthians
- * Club domestic league appearances and goals

John Belton (1 May 1895 – 1952) was an English professional footballer who made over 320 appearances as a right half in the Football League for Nottingham Forest.

== Personal life ==
Belton served as a private in the Leicestershire Regiment and the Labour Corps during the First World War. He was wounded at the Battle of the Somme in 1916 and was evacuated to Britain.

== Honours ==
Nottingham Forest

- Football League Second Division: 1921–22

== Career statistics ==
Appearances and goals by club, season and competition
Club	Season	League			FA Cup		Total	
Club	Season	Division	Apps	Goals	Apps	Goals	Apps	Goals
Nottingham Forest	1914–15	Second Division	24	7	0	0	24	7
Nottingham Forest	1919–20	Second Division	30	6	1	0	31	6
Nottingham Forest	1920–21	Second Division	39	1	2	0	41	1
Nottingham Forest	1921–22	Second Division	40	0	4	0	44	0
Nottingham Forest	1922–23	First Division	28	1	4	0	32	1
Nottingham Forest	1923–24	First Division	33	0	1	0	34	0
Nottingham Forest	1924–25	First Division	28	0	2	0	30	0
Nottingham Forest	1925–26	Second Division	41	0	6	0	47	0
Nottingham Forest	1926–27	Second Division	34	0	1	0	35	0
Nottingham Forest	1927–28	Second Division	25	0	5	0	30	0
Career total			322	16	26	0	348	16
