= Whitwick White Cross F.C. =

Defunct football club from Leicestershire

Whitwick White Cross
- Full name: Whitwick White Cross Football Club
- Nicknames: the Black and Whites
- Founded: 1896
- Dissolved: 1953
- Ground: Vicarage Ground
Home colours

Whitwick White Cross F.C. was an English football club from Whitwick in Leicestershire.

== History ==
The first records for the club are from the 1896–97 season, in which it won its first 14 matches. The club joined the Leicestershire FA in 1897 and the Midland League in 1901, after a year in the Leicestershire League. It spent three years in the Midland League before resigning. The club rejoined the Leicestershire League in 1934 but folded in 1948.

While in the Midland League, they also competed in the FA Cup, reaching the 4th Qualifying Round in 1903–04. Its most successful competition was the Coalville & District Charity Cup, which it won in 1900–01, 1901–02, and 1934–35, and it also won the Leicestershire and Rutland Senior Cup in 1901–02 and 1902–03.

The club is last noted as playing in the 1952–53 season.

== Colours ==
The club originally wore red shirts with a white cross, with an alternate jersey in khaki with the same white cross. By 1910 at the latest the club wore black jerseys (with a change of white), with celebratory rock made in black and white to celebrate successes. The club adopted a "striking" new design in 1936 of black jerseys with a "huge" white Maltese cross, and black shorts with broad white side-stripes.

== Ground ==
The club played at the Vicarage Ground in Whitwick.

== Former players ==
1. Players that have played/managed in the Football League or any foreign equivalent to this level (i.e. fully professional league).
2. Players with full international caps.
3. Players that hold a club record or have captained the club.

- (England) Harry Parker
- (England) George Richards
- (England) Jack Sheffield
