= Len Langford =

English footballer

Leonard Langford (30 May 1899 – 26 December 1973) was an English footballer. His regular position was as a goalkeeper. He was born in Alfreton, Derbyshire. He played for Manchester City, Manchester United, and Nottingham Forest.

== Honours ==
Manchester City

- FA Cup runner-up: 1932–33
