= Harry Parker (footballer) =

English footballer

Personal information
- Full name: Harry Parker
- Positions: Outside left; inside left

Senior career*
Years	Team	Apps	(Gls)
–	Castle Donington		
1901–1902	Glossop	24	(3)
1902–1903	Whitwick White Cross		
1903–1904	Lincoln City	30	(3)
- * Club domestic league appearances and goals

Harry Parker was an English footballer who made 54 appearances in the Football League playing for Glossop and Lincoln City. He played non-league football in the Leicestershire area, for Castle Donington and Midland League club Whitwick White Cross. He played as an outside left or inside left.
