= Leicestershire and Rutland Senior Cup =

Leicestershire & Rutland County Senior Cup
- Organiser(s): Leicestershire & Rutland County FA
- Founded: 1887; 139 years ago
- Region: Leicestershire; Rutland
- Current champions: Coalville Town (2nd title)
- Most championships: Leicester City (Note: Won 2 titles as Leicester Fosse, 4 as Leicester Fosse reserves and 17 as Leicester City reserves.) (23 titles)
- Website: www.leicestershirefa.com

The Leicestershire & Rutland Senior Cup is the county cup for the Leicestershire and Rutland County Football Association (LRCFA). Entry to the competition is selected by the Competitions Committee of LRCFA and usually consists of Step 6 and 7 teams of the National League System. The current holders are Kirby Muxloe who won the 2023–24 competition.

== History ==
The LRCFA covers the ceremonial counties of Leicestershire and Rutland. The Senior Cup was founded in 1887 and was first won by Sheepshed, who defeated Mill Hill House 8–0 in a replay. The first competition consisted of five rounds in total, including the final and was contested by 17 teams. Leicester City have appeared in a record 31 finals, winning on 23 occasions, however first team played and won only 2 finals as Leicester Fosse in 1889–90 and 1890–91, since then only their reserves team competes in the competition.

== Finals ==
This section lists every final of the competition played since 1887, the winners, the runners-up, and the result.

=== Key ===
Match went to a replay
Match went to extra time
Match decided by a penalty shootout after extra time
Shared trophy

Season	Winners	Result	Runner-up	Notes
1887–88	Shepshed	8–0	Mill Hill House	Replay
1888–89	Loughborough		Mill Hill House	
1889–90	Leicester Fosse	4–0	Coalville Town (1878)	Replay after 1–1 draw, both games at Loughborough F.C.
1890–91	Leicester Fosse	2–0	Gresley Rovers	
1891–92	Hugglescote Robin Hoods		Leicester Fosse Rovers	
1892–93	Loughborough Athletic	1–0	Coalville Town (1878)	Replay after 1–1 draw, both matches at Shepshed Athletic were Loughborough's reserve side.
1893–94	Loughborough Athletic		Shepshed Town	
1894–95	Leicester Fosse Rovers	4–0	Loughborough Athletic	At Coalville. Rovers were Fosse's reserve side.
1895–96	Leicester Fosse Rovers		Hugglescote Robin Hoods	
1896–97	Coalville Albion		Hinckley Town	
1897–98	Coalville Albion		Coalville Town(1878)	
1898–99	Gresley Rovers		Swadlincote Town	
1899–00	Hinckley Town		Gresley Rovers	
1900–01	Hinckley Town		Leicester Fosse reserves	
1901–02	Whitwick White Cross		Hinckley Town reserves	
1902–03	Whitwick White Cross		Leicester Fosse reserves	
1903–04	Barrow Rising Star		Coalville Town(1878)	
1904–05	South Wigston Albion		Leicester Fosse reserves	
1905–06	Leicester Imperial		Market Harborough Town	
1906–07	Coalville Town(1878)	2–0	Leicester Fosse reserves	At Hinckley Town
1907–08	Leicester Fosse reserves		Loughborough Corinthians	
1908–09	Leicester Fosse reserves		Hinckley United	
1909–10	Hinckley United		Market Harborough Town	
1910–11	Leicester Imperial		Hinckley United	
1911–12	Leicester Fosse reserves		Hinckley United	
1912–13	Coalville Town(1878)	1–0	Quorn Havelock	At Coalville Swifts
1913–14	Leicester Fosse reserves		Holwell Works	
1914–19	No competition due to World War I.			
1919–20	Leicester City reserves		Moira United	
1920–21	Leicester City reserves		Loughborough Corinthians	
1921–22	Loughborough Corinthians	3–1	Whitwick Imperial	At Filbert Street in front of a crowd of 3,000
1922–23	Loughborough Corinthians	1–0	Whitwick Imperial	At Filbert Street.
1923–24	Leicester City reserves		Barwell United	
1924–25	Leicester City reserves		Barwell United	
1925–26	Leicester City reserves		Moira United	
1926–27	Leicester City reserves		Hinckley United	
1927–28	Loughborough Corinthians		Leicester City reserves	
1928–29	Loughborough Corinthians		Market Harborough Town	
1929–30	Leicester City reserves		Market Harborough Town	
1930–31	Leicester City reserves		Loughborough Corinthians	
1931–32	Leicester City reserves		Market Harborough Town	
1932–33	Leicester City reserves		Loughborough Corinthians	
1933–34	Loughborough Corinthians		Leicester City reserves	
1934–35	Leicester City reserves		Hinckley United	
1935–36	Leicester City reserves		Leicestershire Nomad	
1936–37	Leicester City reserves		Leicestershire Nomad	
1937–38	Leicester City reserves		Leicestershire Nomad	
1938–39	Leicester City reserves		Ibstock Peninstone Rovers	
1939–40	Quorn Methodists		Leicester City Colts	
1940–41	Brush Sports		Ibstock Peninstone Rovers	
1941–42	Brush Sports		Leicester City Colts	
1942–43	COD Old Dalby		Leicester City Colts	
1943–44	COD Old Dalby		Leicester City Colts	
1944–45	Pegson's		COD Old Dalby	
1945–46	Leicester City reserves		Coalville Town (1936)	
1946–47	Brush Sports		Leicester City reserves	
1947–48	Brush Sports		Whitwick Colliery	
1948–49	Brush Sports		Measham Imperial	
1949–50	Leicester City reserves		Brush Sports	
1950–51	Ibstock Penistone Rovers	1–0	Coalville Town (1936)	Replay at Whitwick Colliery after a 4–4 draw.
1951–52	Quorn Methodists		Ibstock Penistone Rovers	
1952–53	Moira United		Quorn	
1953–54	Quorn		Loughborough Colleges	
1954–55	Holwell Works		Leicester City 'A'	
1955–56	Measham Imperial		Burton Albion reserves	
1956–57	Holwell Works		Whitwick Colliery reserves	
1957–58	Holwell Works		Loughborough Colleges	
1958–59	Morris Sports		Loughborough Colleges	
1959–60	Morris Sports		Donisthorpe Colliery Welfare	
1960–61	Morris Sports		Burgess Products	
1961–62	Enderby Town		Sileby Town	
1962–63	Oadby Town		Newfoundpool WMC	
1963–64	Oadby Town		Enderby Town	
1964–65	Enderby Town		Bentley Engineering	
1965–66	Measham Social Welfare		Loughborough United reserves	
1966–67	Enderby Town		Newfoundpool WMC	
1967–68	Wigston Fields		Loughborough Colleges	
1968–69	Newfoundpool WMC		Melton Old Grammarians	
1969–70	Stapenhill		Enderby Town	
1970–71	Enderby Town		Ibstock Penistone Rovers	
1971–72	Enderby Town		Anstey Nomads	
1972–73	Earl Shilton Albion		Friar Lane Old Boys	
1973–74	Friar Lane Old Boys		Earl Shilton Albion	
1974–75	Friar Lane Old Boys		Newfoundpool WMC	
1975–76	Oadby Town		Anstey Nomads	
1976–77	Oadby Town		Friar Lane Old Boys	
1977–78	Shepshed Charterhouse		Wigston Fields	
1978–79	Oadby Town		Shepshed Charterhouse	
1979–80	Shepshed Charterhouse		Enderby Town	
1980–81	Oadby Town		Earl Shilton Albion	
1981–82	Shepshed Charterhouse		Enderby Town	
1982–83	Hinckley Athletic		Birstall United	
1983–84	Shepshed Charterhouse		Hinckley Athletic	
1984–85	Shepshed Charterhouse		Holwell Works	
1985–86	Wigston Town		Narborough & Littlethorpe	
1986–87	Stapenhill	2–1	Holwell Works	
1987–88	Shepshed Charterhouse	1–0	Hinckley Town	
1988–89	Hinckley Town	3–0	Melton Town	
1989–90	Lutterworth Town		Highfield Rangers	
1990–91	Hinckley Town	5–2	Newfoundpool WMC	
1991–92	Friar Lane Old Boys	1–0	Lutterworth Town	
1992–93	Friar Lane Old Boys	2–1	Birstall United	
1993–94	Ibstock Welfare	2–1	St Andrews	
1994–95	Anstey Nomads	2–0	Holwell Sports	
1995–96	Birstall United	1–0	Oadby Town	
1996–97	Barwell	1–0	Friar Lane Old Boys	
1997–98	Birstall United	1–1	Ibstock Welfare	Birstall United won 4–3 on penalties.
1998–99	Birstall United	2–2	Oadby Town	Birstall United won 2–0 on penalties.
1999–00	Coalville Town	2–1	Holwell Sports	
2000–01	St Andrews	2–0	Friar Lane Old Boys	
2001–02	Thurnby Rangers	4–3	Coalville Town	
2002–03	Loughborough Dynamo	1–0	Barrow Town	
2003–04	Loughborough Dynamo	4–1	Downes Sport	
2004–05	Friar Lane & Epworth	3–2	Kirby Muxloe	
2005–06	Thurnby Rangers	1–0	Friar Lane & Epworth	
2006–07	Kirby Muxloe	3–2	Ibstock United	After extra-time.
2007–08	Blaby & Whetstone Athletic	2–0	Anstey Town	After extra-time.
2008–09	Quorn reserves	1–0	Leicestershire Constabulary	After extra-time.
2009–10	Heather St John's	2–1	Thurmaston Town	
2010–11	Heather St John's	4–1	Thurnby Nirvana	
2011–12	Ibstock United	3–1	Ashby Ivanhoe	
2012–13	Aylestone Park	3–1	Ashby Ivanhoe	
2013–14	St Andrews	2–0	Quorn reserves	
2014–15	Bardon Hill Sports	1–0	Hinckley	
2015–16	Hinckley	5–1	Oakham United	
2016–17	Leicester Road	2–1	Holwell Sports	
2017–18	NKF Burbage	3–2	Heather St John's	After extra-time.
2018–19	Heather St John's	1–1	Melton Town	Heather St John's won 4–3 on penalties.
2019–20	Competition abandoned due to COVID-19 pandemic. Leicester Road and Ingles were in the finals.			
2020–21	Competition not held due to COVID-19 pandemic.			
2021–22	No Competition			
2022–23	Ashby Ivanhoe	3–1	Lutterworth Athletic	
2023–24	Kirby Muxloe	2–2	Hathern	Kirby Muxloe won 6–5 on penalties.
2024–25	Birstall United	0–0	Heather St John's	Birstall United won 5–4 on penalties.
2025–26	Coalville Town	0–0	Lutterworth Athletic Reserves	Coalville Town won 4–2 on penalties.

=== Wins by teams ===
Club	Wins	First final won	Last final won	Runner-up	Last final lost	Total apps.	Notes
Leicester City	25	1889–90	1949–50	9	1954–55	34	(Note: Won 2 titles as Leicester Fosse, 6 as Leicester Fosse Rovers/reserves, and 17 as Leicester City reserves.)
Oadby Town	6	1962–63	1980–81	2	1998–99	8	
Shepshed Charterhouse	6	1977–78	1987–88	1	1978–79	7	
Friar Lane & Epworth	5	1973–74	2004–05	5	2005–06	10	(Note: Won 4 titles as Friar Lane Old Boys.)
Enderby Town	5	1961–62	1971–72	4	1981–82	9	
Loughborough Corinthians †	5	1921–22	1933–34	4	1932–33	9	(Note: Dissolved in 1934.)
Brush Sports †	5	1940–41	1948–49	1	1949–50	6	(Note: Dissolved in 1960.)
Quorn	4	1939–40	2008–09	2	2013–14	6	(Note: Won 2 titles as Quorn Methodists and 1 title as Quorn reserves.)
Hinckley Town †	4	1899–00	1990–91	3	1987–88	7	(Note: Dissolved in 1997. Merged with Hinckley Athletic to form Hinckley United.)
Birstall United	4	1995–96	2024–25	2	1992–93	6	
Holwell Sports	3	1954–55	1957–58	6	2016–17	9	(Note: Won 3 titles as Holwell Works.)
Heather St John's	3	2009–10	2018–19	2	2024–25	5	
Loughborough †	3	1888–89	1893–94	1	1894–95	4	(Note: Dissolved in 1900. Won 2 titles as Loughborough Athletic and 1 title as Loughborough Town.)
Morris Sports †	3	1958–59	1960–61	0	–	3	(Note: Dissolved)
Hinckley Athletic†	2	1982–83	1982–83	6	1983–84	2	(Note: Dissolved in 1997. Merged with Hinckley Town to form Hinckley United. Won 1 title as Hinckley United.)
Coalville Town (1878) †	2	1906–07	1912–13	4	1903–04	6	(Note: Dissolved in 1924.)
Coalville Town	2	1999–00	2025–26	1	2001–02	2	
Ibstock United †	2	1993–94	2011–12	2	2006–07	4	(Note: Dissolved in 2018. Won 1 title as Ibstock Welfare.)
COD Old Dalby †	2	1942–43	1943–44	1	1944–45	3	(Note: Dissolved)
Kirby Muxloe	2	2006–07	2023–24	1	2004–05	3	
St Andrews	2	2000–01	2013–14	1	1993–94	2	
Coalville Albion	2	1896–97	1897–98	0	–	2	
Leicester Imperial †	2	1905–06	1910–11	0	–	2	(Note: Dissolved in 2001.)
Loughborough Dynamo	2	2002–03	2003–04	0	–	2	
Stapenhill	2	1969–70	1986–87	0	–	2	
Thurnby Rangers	2	2001–02	2005–06	0	–	2	
Whitwick White Cross †	2	1901–02	1902–03	0	–	2	(Note: Dissolved in 1953.)
Ibstock Penistone Rovers †	1	1950–51	1950–51	4	1970–71	5	(Note: Dissolved in 1970s.)
Newfoundpool WMC	1	1968–69	1968–69	4	1990–91	5	
Anstey Nomads	1	1994–95	1994–95	2	1975–76	3	
Ashby Ivanhoe	1	2022–23	2022–23	2	2012–13	3	
Earl Shilton Albion	1	1972–73	1972–73	2	1980–81	3	
Gresley Rovers	1	1898–99	1898–99	2	1899–00	3	
Moira United	1	1952–53	1952–53	2	1925–26	3	
Hinckley	1	2015–16	2015–16	1	2014–15	2	
Hugglescote Robin Hoods	1	1891–92	1891–92	1	1895–96	2	
Lutterworth Town	1	1989–90	1989–90	1	1991–92	2	
Measham Imperial †	1	1955–56	1955–56	1	1948–49	2	(Note: Dissolved in 2000s.)
Wigston Fields †	1	1967–68	1967–68	1	1977–78	2	(Note: Dissolved in 1963.)
Aylestone Park	1	2012–13	2012–13	0	–	1	
Bardon Hill Sports	1	2014–15	2014–15	0	–	1	
Barrow Rising Star †	1	1903–04	1903–04	0	–	1	(Note: Dissolved in 2005.)
Barwell	1	1996–97	1996–97	0	–	1	
Blaby & Whetstone Athletic	1	2007–08	2007–08	0	–	1	
Leicester Road	1	2016–17	2016–17	0	–	1	
Measham Social Welfare †	1	1965–66	1965–66	0	–	1	(Note: Dissolved in early 2000s.)
NKF Burbage †	1	2017–18	2017–18	0	–	1	(Note: Dissolved in 2020.)
Pegson's	1	1944–45	1944–45	0	–	1	
Sheepshed	1	1887–88	1887–88	0	–	1	
South Wigston Albion	1	1904–05	1904–05	0	–	1	
Wigston Town	1	1985–86	1985–86	0	–	1	

=== Recent finals ===
29 May 2012	Ibstock United	3–1	Ashby Ivanhoe	Holmes Park
19:00 BST		2012 Cup Final Report		Referee: Ryan O'Mahony

8 May 2013	Aylestone Park	3–1	Ashby Ivanhoe	Holmes Park
19:00 BST		2013 Cup Final Report		Referee: Darren Russell

16 May 2014	Quorn reserves	0–2	St Andrews	Holmes Park
19:00 BST		2014 Cup Final Video

8 May 2015	Bardon Hill	1–0	Hinckley	Holmes Park
19:00 BST		2015 Cup Final Report

3 May 2016	Oakham United	1–5	Hinckley	Holmes Park
19:00 BST	Lewis Leckie 47'	2016 Cup Final Report; 2016 Cup Final Report; 2016 Cup Final Video	Ryan Seal 8', 49', 58'; Isaac Cooper 13'; Javia Roberts 25'	Attendance: 280

2 May 2017	Leicester Road	2–1	Holwell Sports	Holmes Park
19:00 BST				Referee: Lauren Holt

1 May 2018	Heather St John's	2–3 (a.e.t.)	NKF Burbage	Holmes Park
19:00 BST				Referee: Ruebyn Ricardo

9 April 2019	Melton Town	1–1 (a.e.t.) (3–4 p)	Heather St John's	Holmes Park
19:00 BST				Referee: Ryan Goddard

16 May 2023	Ashby Ivanhoe	3–1	Lutterworth Athletic	Holmes Park
19:00 BST		Report

14 May 2024	Hathern	2–2 (a.e.t.) (5–6 p)	Kirby Muxloe	Holmes Park
19:00 BST		Report

29 April 2025	Birstall United	0–0 (a.e.t.) (5–4 p)	Heather St John's	Holmes Park
19:00 BST		Report

== Records & statistics ==
=== Finals ===
- Most final wins: 23
  - Leicester City
- Most final lost: 8
  - Leicester City
- Most consecutive finals win: 5
  - Leicester City (1934–35, 1935–36, 1936–37, 1937–38, 1938–39)
- Most consecutive finals lost: 3
  - Leicestershire Nomad (1935–36, 1936–37, 1937–38)
  - Leicester City Colts (1941–42, 1942–43, 1943–44)
- Most finals played without losing: 3
  - Morris Sports (1958–59, 1959–60, 1960–61)
- Most finals played without winning: 5
  - Market Harborough Town (1905–06, 1909–10, 1928–29, 1929–30, 1931–32)
