= Firbeck Main F.C. =

Firbeck Main
- Full name: Firbeck Main Football Club

Firbeck Main F.C. was an English association football club based in Langold, Nottinghamshire.

== History ==
The club played in the local Worksop leagues during the Second World War and joined the Yorkshire League after hostilities ended. Their spell in this competition lasted just a single season.

=== League and cup history ===
Firbeck Main League and Cup history
Season	Division	Position	FA Cup
1935–36			Extra preliminary round
1945–46	Yorkshire League	8th/15	1st qualifying round
1946–47			Preliminary round
1947–48			Extra preliminary round
1948–49			1st qualifying round
1949–50			Preliminary round

== Records ==
- Best FA Cup performance: 1st qualifying round, 1945–46, 1948–49
