= Loughborough Corinthians F.C. =

Loughborough Corinthians
- Nickname(s): the Corries
- Founded: 1896
- Dissolved: 1934
- Ground: Brown's Lane
Home colours	Away colours

Loughborough Corinthians F.C. was an English football club based in Loughborough, Leicestershire, that played in the Midland League.

== History ==
The club was founded in 1896 by former pupils of the local grammar school. It joined the Midland League in 1925, and played in the competition for eight seasons, its best finish being 6th (out of 26) in 1929–30.

The club's final triumph, in the 1933–34 Leicestershire Senior Cup, which the club won by beating Leicester City Reserves 3–2, was bittersweet; in deep financial difficulties, the club did not re-join the Central Combination for 1934–35. The local council duly seized and sold the ground later that year in lieu of unpaid rates, forcing the club to shut down, and, despite the directors hoping to revive the club, they were never able to do so. The most valuable of the club's assets - which only covered a fifth of the outstanding rates - was a roller, sold for £8 to Shepshed.

== Colours ==
The club's traditional colours were blue jerseys and white shorts; their change strip was white. In its last years the club changed the shirt design by adding white sleeves.

== Ground ==
The club originally played at Park Road, taking over the Athletic Ground in 1903. It was bulldozed in 1908 for housing; the last game there was the Corinthians against Coalville Town. The club therefore moved to a new ground on Glebe Street, where it played until 1922, when it moved to Brown's Lane.

== Former players ==
1. Players that have played/managed in the Football League or any foreign equivalent to this level (i.e. fully professional league).
2. Players with full international caps.
3. Players that hold a club record or have captained the club.

- (England) Jackie Belton
- (Scotland) Adam Plunkett
- (England) Jack Sheffield
- (Scotland) Jock Scott
