= Port of Bristol F.C. =

Association football club in England

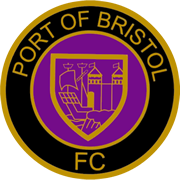
- Full name: Port of Bristol Football Club
- Nicknames: Portway men, Port, PBA, Purple Army
- Founded: 1978 (Refounded 2014)
- Dissolved: 1992
- Ground: Nibley Road, Bristol
- League: Bristol & Suburban League Div.2
Home colours	Away colours

Port of Bristol Football Club (aka Port of Bristol FC) is a football club formed in 1978, based in Shirehampton, Bristol, England. They compete in the Bristol and Suburban Association Football League. The club is run by the Port of Bristol trust and fields teams from juniors to seniors.

Their kit is purple and black, and their away strip is red and black.

== History ==
The club played in the Gloucestershire County Football League and won promotion from Division 9 twice (1982 and 1985), but by the end of the 1993-94 financial woes hit the club, and they merged with neighbours Totterdown Athletic to form Tottertown-Port of Bristol FC. The merger then folded at the conclusion of the 2006–07 season after producing only one top half of the table finish in its existence.

Port of Bristol Football Club was re-founded in 2014 with junior teams being fielded for the first time in 7 years. Senior football returned and in the 2019–2020 season and entered the Len Bartlett Cup, making it to the semi-finals.

The following season they won Division 6 Bristol Suburban league and won promotion.

== Ground ==
Port of Bristol FC are based at The PBA Community and Sports hub on the banks of the River Avon, in Shirehampton village, Bristol.

== Rivalries ==
Port of Bristol's nearest rivals are Bristol Manor Farm FC and Shirehampton F.C.

== Records and statistics ==
- Record League Victory
  - 13-0 v. Warmley Rangers F.C. (1984)
- Record FA Vase Victory
  - 5-0 v. Abingdon Town (1979–1980)
- Record League Defeat
  - 0-7 v. Stoke Lane AFC (1982)
- Record FA Vase Defeat
  - 0-5 v. Exmouth Town F.C. (1984–85)

== Honours ==
League

Gloucestershire County League (11th tier)

- Runners-up: (2) 1982–83, 1984–1985

Bristol and Suburban Association Football League

- Division 6 (17th tier) Champions 2020–2021
- Division 9 Sunday League Champions: (2) 1985, 1990
- Division 10 Sunday League Champions: (2) 1982, 1987

Domestic Cups

FA Vase

- 3rd round 1980–81

Len Bartlett Cup

- Semi-finalist 2020
