= Jimmy Stein =

Scottish footballer

Personal information
- Full name: James Stein
- Date of birth: 7 November 1904
- Place of birth: Coatbridge, Scotland
- Date of death: 1979 (aged 74–75)
- Place of death: Whitburn, Scotland
- Height: 5 ft 10 1/2 in (1.79 m)
- Position: Outside left

Senior career*
Years	Team	Apps	(Gls)
1921–1922	Bathgate	11	(5)
1922–1923	Broxburn	3	(0)
1923–1924	Dykehead	9	(1)
1924	Blackburn Rovers (SCO)		
1924–1928	Dunfermline Athletic	120	(35)
1928–1936	Everton	215	(57)
1936–1938	Burnley	47	(10)
1938–1940	New Brighton	46	(6)
- * Club domestic league appearances and goals

James Stein (7 November 1904 – 1979) was a Scottish professional association footballer who played as an outside left.

== Career ==
Stein signed as a youngster with West Lothian clubs Bathgate and Broxburn and Lanarkshire team Dykehead, playing at centre-forward; at which time he stayed locally in East Whitburn. He signed with West Lothian Junior side Blackburn Rovers for the 1924–25 season; he scored twice in a league game against Bo'ness Juniors and shortly afterwards on 24 October 1924, at the age of 19, he signed terms with Second Division Scottish Football League Division Two side Dunfermline Athletic. Dunfermline were promoted as Champions in season 1925–26 and during the next four seasons Stein made 120 appearances, scoring 35 goals, before signing for Everton in 1928.

He made his English Football League debut against Bolton Wanderers that December but only played five times in his debut season, establishing himself in the team in the 1929–30 season, when despite him scoring 10 goals, they were relegated. He was part of The Toffees teams that won the Second Division Championship, First Division Championship and then the FA Cup in successive seasons between 1930–31 and 1932–33, and had the distinction of scoring Everton's first-ever goal at Wembley when he netted in the 1933 FA Cup Final in the 3–0 win over Manchester City.

He moved on to Burnley in October 1936 after 57 goals in 215 appearances for the Toffees, adding 10 goals in 47 appearances for the Clarets over two seasons, before ending his career at New Brighton, joining them in June 1938 and scoring 6 goals in 46 appearances before the outbreak of The Second World War, and the end of peacetime football in September 1939.

== Honours ==
Everton

- FA Cup: 1932–33
