= Wigston Fields F.C. =

Wigston Fields
- Full name: Wigston Fields Football Club
- Ground: Windsor Avenue

Wigston Fields F.C. was an English football club from Wigston Fields, Leicestershire.

== History ==
The club competed in the Leicestershire Senior League from 1957 to 1991, and the Midland Football Combination from 1991 to 1993.

They won promotion to the Leicestershire League Division 1 in 1960 and to the Premier Division in 1983.

They also competed in the FA Cup and FA Vase, reaching the 2nd qualifying round of the former in 1985 and 1987.

== Honours ==
- Leicestershire and Rutland Senior Cup: 1967–68
