= Jock Scott (footballer) =

Scottish footballer

Personal information
- Full name: John McRae Scott
- Date of birth: 3 November 1906
- Place of birth: Sanquhar, Dumfriesshire, Scotland
- Date of death: 18 September 1981 (aged 74)
- Place of death: Dumfries, Dumfries and Galloway, Scotland
- Height: 5 ft 11 in (1.80 m)
- Positions: Half-back; inside forward

Senior career*
Years	Team	Apps	(Gls)
- Euchan Thistle
- Kello Rovers
–1928	Nithsdale Wanderers		
1928–1929	Luton Town	0	(0)
1928	→ Loughborough Corinthians (loan)		
1929–1930	Norwich City	10	(4)
1930–1931	Bristol Rovers	0	(0)
1931–1933	Walsall	45	(2)
1933–1934	York City	34	(1)
1933–	Southport	22	(2)
- Workington
- * Club domestic league appearances and goals

John McRae Scott (3 November 1906 – 18 September 1981) was a Scottish professional footballer who played as a half-back or an inside forward in the Football League for Norwich City, Walsall, York City and Southport, in non-League football for Loughborough Corinthians and Workington, was on the books of Luton Town and Bristol Rovers without making a league appearance and in Scottish football for Euchan Thistle, Kello Rovers and Nithsdale Wanderers.
