= Normanby Park Works F.C. =

Normanby Park Works
- Full name: Normanby Park Works Football Club

Normanby Park Works Football Club was an English association football club based in Scunthorpe, Lincolnshire. It competed in the FA Cup for many years, firstly as Lysaghts Sports.
