= Lloyds (Sittingbourne) F.C. =

Lloyds (Sittingbourne)
- Full name: Lloyds (Sittingbourne) Football Club
- Founded: 1927

Lloyds (Sittingbourne) Football Club was an English association football club.

== History ==
The club was founded in 1927 as UK Paper. The club later changed name to Bowaters, before renaming to Lloyds (Sittingbourne). Under the guise of Lloyds, the club entered the FA Cup, reaching the first round in the 1932–33 season, before losing 8–1 against Northampton Town. Following World War II, Lloyds entered the FA Cup four more times, before dropping out of the Kent League in 1949. The club later renamed to Swale United, joining the Kent County League in 2004.

== Records ==
- Best FA Cup performance: First round, 1932–33
