= Walter Harrison (footballer) =

English footballer

Personal information
- Full name: Walter Harrison
- Date of birth: 16 January 1923
- Place of birth: Coalville, England
- Date of death: 1979 (aged 55–56)
- Position: Wing half

Senior career*
Years	Team	Apps	(Gls)
- Coalville Town
1946–1950	Leicester City	125	(3)
1951–1953	Chesterfield	74	(12)
- Corby Town
Total		199	(15)
- * Club domestic league appearances and goals

Walter Harrison (16 January 1923 – 1979) was an English footballer who played in the Football League for Chesterfield and Leicester City.

== Honours ==
Leicester City

- FA Cup runner-up: 1948–49
