= Coalville Town F.C. (1878) =

Defunct association football club in England

- Full name: Coalville Town Football Club
- Nicknames: Town, the Villans
- Founded: 1878
- Dissolved: 1924
- Ground: Waggon & Horses Ground
before c. 1905 colours	from 1905 colours

Coalville Town F.C. was an association football club from Coalville, Leicestershire, active before the First World War.

== History ==
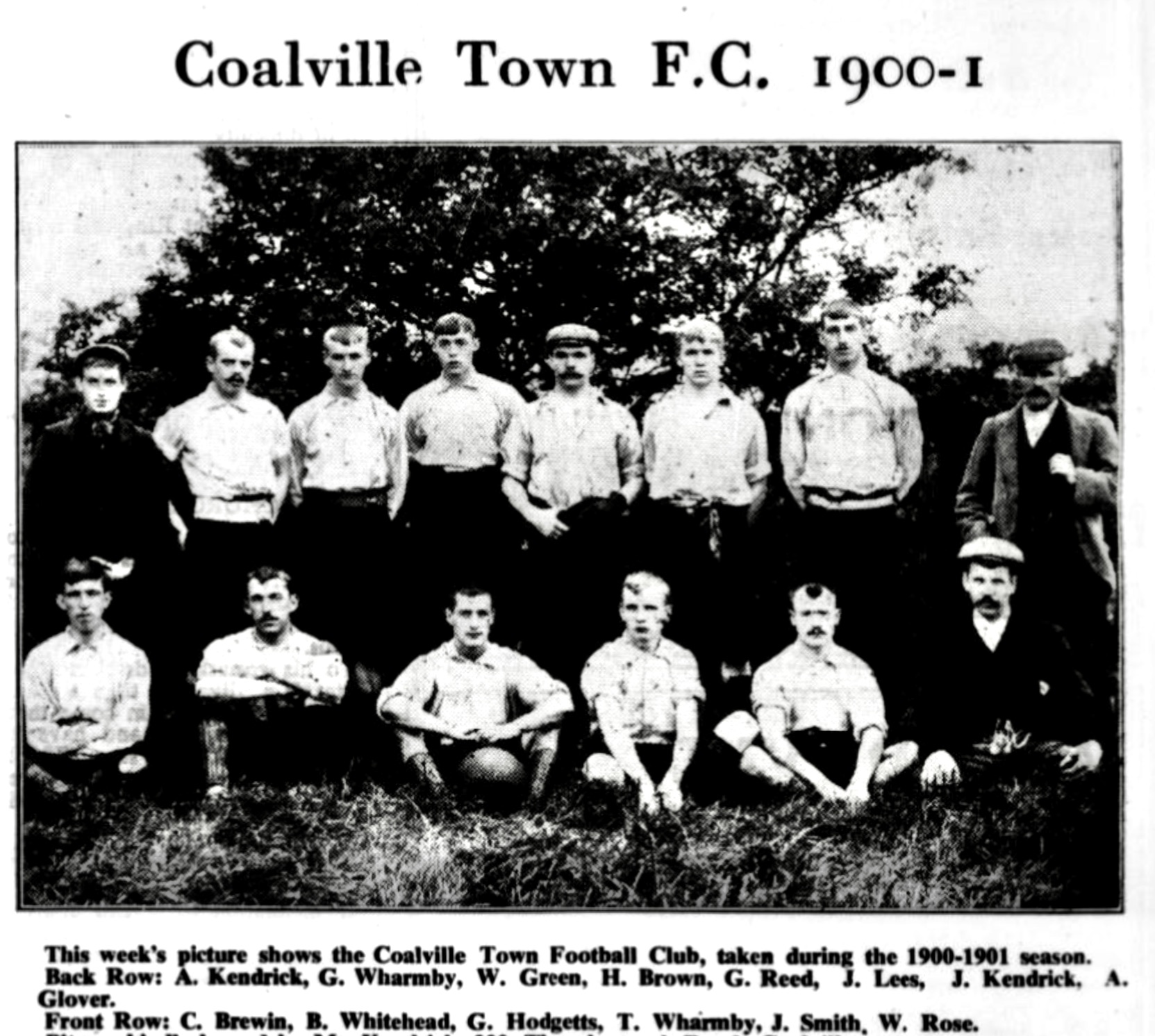
The 1900–01 Coalville Town side, Coalville Times, 19 February 1947

The earliest record for the club is from the 1878–79 season, under the name Snibston Rising Star. From the 1883–84 season, the club changed its name to Coalville Town.

The club first came to significant attention by reaching the final of the Leicestershire and Rutland Senior Cup in 1889–90, losing to Leicester Fosse in a final replay, both games at the Loughborough Athletic Ground. It reached five finals before the First World War, taking the trophy for the first time in 1906–07 with a 2–0 win over the Fosse reserves at Hinckley, after four final defeats.

The club entered the FA Cup for the first time in 1893–94 and was a regular entrant until 1924–25. However it never reached the first round proper. Its best run came in 1897–98, when it reached the fourth qualifying round (of five), losing 2–0 at Long Eaton Rangers.

The club was a founder member of the Leicestershire Senior League in 1896–97, after spending a season in the Leicestershire and Northamptonshire League, and had been part of a one-off Leicestershire league competition in 1890–91. After a runner-up finish in 1899–1900, it stepped up to the Midland League, but after two seasons struggling near the foot of the table, returned to the Leicestershire competition in 1903–04, not bothering to seek re-election to the Midland in 1902–03 because of the "scant" support.

Coalville took the title for the only time in 1907–08, only losing once in 22 matches. The competition was in abeyance during the First World War, but on its resumption the club struggled, finishing last in 1919–20 and 1921–22. The club collapsed entirely in the 1924–25 season, with low gate receipts not eating into the club's growing debt, and it formally disbanded in late December, owing £65. Part of the blame was put on a Football Association ruling that professionals had to be paid a minimum wage of 10/-, as well as easy train journeys to see Derby County and Leicester City. The club's record (3 wins, 2 draws, and 5 defeats) was expunged.

== Colours ==
The club's earliest recorded colours are white shirts. By 1905 the club was wearing blue and white.

== Ground ==
The club played at the Waggon and Horses ground on Mantle Lane. Until his death in March 1923, the landlord of the Waggon & Horses Inn during the club's tenure was Samuel Clamp, described as "the club's most staunch supporter", and instrumental in providing the resources to keep the club going, particularly during the First World War.

== Notable players ==
- Notable players ( 6 )

The club's most notable player was Joe Bradford, who became Birmingham's all-time leading scorer. Bradford's cousin, Hugh Adcock, also played for the Town before 1923.

== Honours ==
- Leicestershire Senior League
  - Winner: 1907–08
  - Runner-up: 1899–1900, 1906–07, 1910–11, 1914–15
- Leicestershire & Rutland Senior Cup
  - Winner: 1906–07, 1912–13
  - Runner-up: 1889–90, 1893–93, 1897–98, 1903–04
