= Billy Furness =

English footballer

Personal information
- Full name: William Isaac Furness
- Date of birth: 8 June 1909
- Place of birth: Washington, County Durham, England
- Date of death: 29 August 1980 (aged 71)
- Position: Inside forward

Youth career
- Usworth Colliery

Senior career*
Years	Team	Apps	(Gls)
1928–1937	Leeds United	243	(62)
1937–1947	Norwich City	93	(21)

International career
1933	England	1	(0)
- * Club domestic league appearances and goals

William Isaac Furness (8 June 1909 – 29 August 1980) was an English professional footballer who played as an inside forward for Leeds United and Norwich City in the 1930s, making one appearance for England in 1933.

== Career ==
Furness was born in Washington, County Durham and played his early football for Usworth Colliery from where he was signed by Leeds United in August 1928 for a fee of £50.

=== Leeds United ===
At this time Leeds were struggling in the lower reaches of the First Division and were getting something of a reputation for being a yo-yo team – after being elected to the Second Division in 1920, they were promoted in 1924, relegated in 1927 and promoted again in 1928. Furness took a while to break into the first team, with Russell Wainscoat and Eric Longden having established themselves in the inside forward positions. In the 1930–31 season Furness displaced Longden and from then on he was rarely out of the side, but his eight goals were unable to stave off relegation and Leeds were to spend the 1931–32 season in the Second Division. With Charlie Keetley scoring 23 goals and 12 from Furness, Leeds returned to the top flight as runners-up in Division Two.

In the first season back in Division One, Furness was ever-present scoring six goals from 42 league appearances, as Leeds finished in eight place with Arthur Hydes the new spearhead, scoring 16. Furness's form was to be rewarded with his solitary England cap, when he was selected, along with his Leeds teammate Wilf Copping, for the first-ever match against Italy on 13 May 1933. The match ended 1–1 with England's goal coming from Cliff Bastin. As well as Furness and Copping, four other players were making their England debut.

Furness only missed one match in 1933–34 as Leeds again finished in the upper half of the table. In a memorable match against Leicester City on 7 April 1934 Furness, Harry Duggan, Joe Firth and Johnny Mahon each scored twice in an 8–0 victory – this remains Leeds' best ever League win.

Leeds struggled in 1934–35 and, although Hydes continued to score freely with 22 goals with Furness acting as an excellent foil, hitting 16 goals in 34 appearances, with seven of those coming in the last six matches of the season, the defence was poor conceding 8 at Stoke, 7 at Chelsea, 6 at West Bromwich Albion, and 4 against Middlesbrough, Sunderland, Liverpool and Everton. As a result, Leeds narrowly avoided relegation finishing in 18th place.

Things improved slightly for Leeds in 1935–36 with an eleventh-place finish with Furness contributing seven goals (including a penalty against Arsenal in the final match of the season) with George Brown top scorer on 20. Furness's final season at Elland Road saw the club struggling again to avoid relegation finishing in nineteenth place.

In June 1937, Furness was transferred to Norwich City for a fee of £2700 after nine years, 257 matches and 66 goals for the club.

=== Norwich City ===
Furness played the next two seasons for Norwich City in the Second Division. At the end of the 1938–39 season, Norwich were relegated to the Third Division South. Although Furness played in the first three matches of the next season, scoring twice, league football was then suspended following the outbreak of the Second World War.

After the war, Furness returned to the Norwich side, making a dozen appearances in the 1946–47 season before retiring, having made 99 appearances (excluding wartime matches) scoring 23 goals.

=== Later career ===
After retiring as a player, Furness remained at Carrow Road as assistant trainer and subsequently as head trainer, a position he held until 1955. He subsequently served the club as a physiotherapist until 1963.

In 2003, he was inducted into the Norwich City Hall of Fame.
