= Jimmy Dunn (footballer, born 1900) =

Scottish footballer

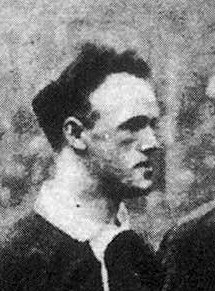
- Dunn prior to the 'Wembley Wizards match, 1928

Personal information
- Date of birth: 25 November 1900
- Place of birth: Glasgow, Scotland
- Date of death: 27 August 1963 (aged 62)
- Position: Inside right

Senior career*
| Years | Team | Apps | (Gls) |
- St Anthony's
| 1920–1928 | Hibernian | 268 | (91) |
| 1928–1935 | Everton | 140 | (42) |
| 1935–1936 | Exeter City | | |
| 1936–1937 | Runcorn | | |

International career
| 1925–1928 | Scotland | 6 | (2) |
| 1922 | Scottish League XI | 1 | (0) |
- * Club domestic league appearances and goals

James Dunn (25 November 1900 – 20 August 1963) was a Scottish international footballer, most famous for being part of the 1928 Wembley Wizards team.

== Club career ==
Dunn, born in Glasgow and nicknamed "ginger" due to his hair, started his senior career in 1920 when Hibernian signed him from his local Junior side St Anthony's. He stayed eight years with the Edinburgh club (304 matches, 103 goals in the Scottish Football League and Scottish Cup), helping them to consecutive Scottish Cup finals in 1923 and 1924. However, he collected a runner-up medal on each occasion.

Dunn joined Everton immediately after his Wembley escapades and played with the Merseyside club for the next 7 seasons. He won a Second Division championship and Football League championship with the Toffees in consecutive seasons (1931 and 1932) and was part of their FA Cup-winning side of 1933, scoring in the final itself.

After scoring 49 goals in 155 matches for Everton, he left Goodison Park in 1935 for Exeter City, becoming the Grecians' record signing in the process. He joined Runcorn the following year before retiring into a coaching role.

== International career ==
In 1925, Dunn earned his first selection for the Scotland national team, playing in the 3–1 defeat of Wales at Tynecastle. He gained a further 4 Scotland caps with Hibs, the most memorable being the last, against England at Wembley in 1928.

Dunn was a late inclusion in the side for the British Home Championship match, having missed selection for the preceding international trial match between home-based and Anglo-Scots. The entire Scottish forward line measured 5 foot 7 or less, and it was widely expected that the bigger, stronger English side would overpower their Scottish opponents. Dunn and his colleagues thought otherwise and raced to a surprise 5–1 victory, a record Scottish win at Wembley. The victory was widely celebrated in Scotland, and the team was later somewhat mythologised as the Wembley Wizards.

While at Everton, Dunn gained one further cap, again against Wales.

== Personal life ==
His son, Jimmy Jr., would later also find fame on the football field, participating in Wolverhampton Wanderers' victorious 1949 FA Cup team.

Dunn's great-great-nephew is footballer Alex Harris. Jimmy had 6 siblings, Joseph, John, Mary-Ann, Thomas, Andrew, Maggie All born from 1873 to 1900 being Jimmy the youngest, His Mother's maiden name was McGinnes, and she was Irish of descent. James wife's maiden name (Sarah) was Symington, and her father's name was Brown, her grandmothers name was Smart. Sarahs Mother died when Sarah was 17, she was 32. Jimmy ended his lie penniless in part due to embezzlement of funds from businesses he owned in the Everton area by the store manager of the time.

== Honours ==
Everton

- Football League First Division: 1931–32
- Football League Second Division: 1930–31
- FA Cup: 1932–33
