= 1932–33 FA Cup =

Tournament details
- Country: England; Wales

Final positions
- Champions: Everton (2nd title)
- Runners-up: Manchester City

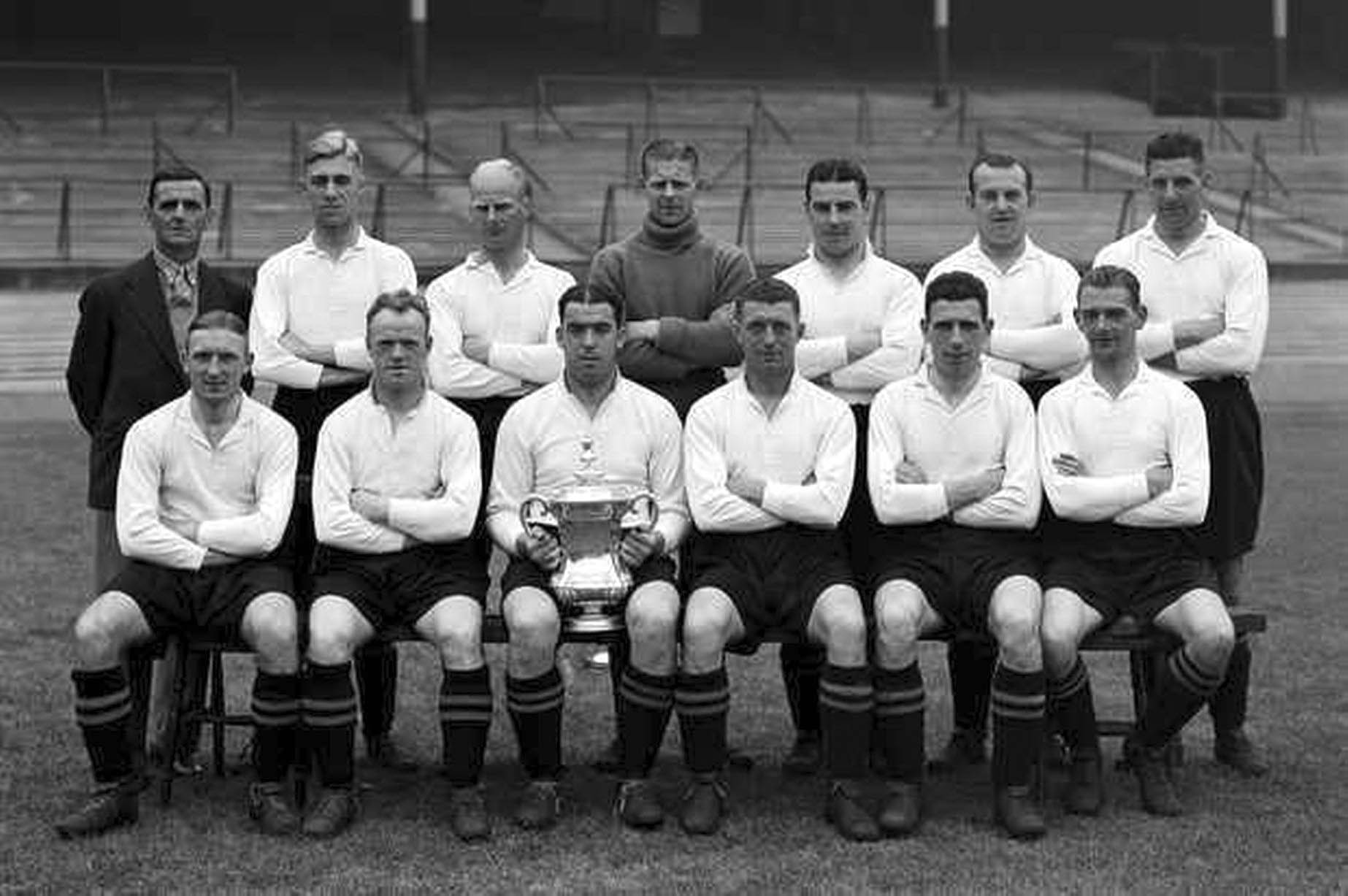
FA Cup 1933 winners Everton

The 1932–33 FA Cup was the 58th season of the world's oldest football cup competition, the Football Association Challenge Cup, commonly known as the FA Cup. Everton won the competition for the second time, beating Manchester City 3–0 in the final at Wembley.

Matches were scheduled to be played at the stadium of the team named first on the date specified for each round, which was always a Saturday. Some matches, however, might be rescheduled for other days if there were clashes with games for other competitions or the weather was inclement. If scores were level after 90 minutes had been played, a replay would take place at the stadium of the second-named team later the same week. If the replayed match was drawn further replays would be held until a winner was determined. If scores were level after 90 minutes had been played in a replay, a 30-minute period of extra time would be played.

== Calendar ==
Round	Date
Extra preliminary round	Saturday 3 September 1932
Preliminary round	Saturday 17 September 1932
First round qualifying	Saturday 1 October 1932
Second round qualifying	Saturday 15 October 1932
Third round qualifying	Saturday 29 October 1932
Fourth round qualifying	Saturday 12 November 1932
First round proper	Saturday 26 November 1932
Second round proper	Saturday 10 December 1932
Third round proper	Saturday 14 January 1933
Fourth round proper	Saturday 28 January 1933
Fifth round proper	Saturday 18 February 1933
Sixth round proper	Saturday 4 March 1933
Semi-finals	Saturday 18 March 1933
Final	Saturday 29 April 1933

== Qualifying rounds ==
Most teams that were not members of the Football League competed in the qualifying rounds to secure one of 25 places available in the first round. This season, Football League Third Division South club Brighton & Hove Albion also competed in the qualifying rounds after submitting incorrect paperwork with their entry and not being exempted to the first round proper.

The 25 winners from the fourth qualifying round were Spennymoor United, Crook Town, Scarborough, Workington, Stalybridge Celtic, Darwen, Nelson, Boston Town, Gainsborough Trinity, Denaby United, Scunthorpe & Lindsey United, Hereford United, Ilford, Romford, Wycombe Wanderers, Margate, Folkestone, Dartford, Kingstonian, Lloyds (Sittingbourne), Guildford City, Ryde Sports, Merthyr Town and Yeovil & Petter's United along with Brighton & Hove Albion.

Those appearing in the competition proper for the first time were Hereford United, Wycombe Wanderers, Lloyds (Sittingbourne) and Ryde Sports. Stalybridge Celtic reached this stage for the first time since withdrawing from the Football League in 1923, while Romford had last featured in the first round in 1885-86.

For the first time, three clubs progressed to the main draw from the extra preliminary round. Spennymoor United defeated Dawdon Colliery Recreation, Murton Colliery Welfare, Seaham Colliery Welfare, Wardley Welfare, Horden Colliery Welfare and Bridlington Town; Lloyds (Sittingbourne) defeated Royal Marines Chatham, Canterbury Waverley, Callender Athletic, Beckenham, Sheppey United and Wimbledon; and Merthyr Town defeated Ebbw Vale, Barry, Hanham Athletic, Llanelli, St Philip's Marsh Adult School and Street. All three clubs lost in the first round proper.

However, the talk of the tournament was Brighton & Hove Albion's unprecedented run to the fifth round proper. Entering in the first qualifying round, Brighton defeated Shoreham, Worthing, Hastings & St Leonards and Barnet to reach the main draw before knocking out Crystal Palace, Wrexham, Chelsea and Bradford Park Avenue. They went out to West Ham United in a fifth round replay at Upton Park but by then they had become the first (and only) Football League club ever to feature in nine rounds of an individual Cup competition. Barring an exceptional decision or allowance by the FA, this feat is no longer attainable by clubs in the Football or Premier Leagues.

== First round proper ==
At this stage 41 clubs from the Football League Third Division North and South joined the 25 clubs that came through the qualifying rounds. Barnsley and Watford were given byes to the third round. To make the number of matches up, non-league sides Dulwich Hamlet and Marine were given byes to this round as the winner and finalist from the previous season's FA Amateur Cup.

34 matches were scheduled to be played on Saturday, 26 November 1932. Eight were drawn and went to replays in the following midweek fixture, of which one went to a second replay.

Tie no	Home team	Score	Away team	Date
1	Chester	4–0	Rotherham United	26 November 1932
2	Darlington	1–0	Boston Town	26 November 1932
3	Dartford	0–0	Yeovil & Petter's United	26 November 1932
Replay	Yeovil & Petter's United	4–2	Dartford	1 December 1932
4	Barrow	0–1	Gateshead	26 November 1932
5	Bristol City	4–0	Romford	26 November 1932
6	Rochdale	0–2	Stockport County	26 November 1932
7	Marine	2–5	Hartlepools United	26 November 1932
8	Reading	3–2	Brentford	26 November 1932
9	Walsall	4–1	Mansfield Town	26 November 1932
10	Folkestone	1–0	Norwich City	26 November 1932
11	Gillingham	1–1	Wycombe Wanderers	26 November 1932
Replay	Wycombe Wanderers	2–4	Gillingham	30 November 1932
12	Crewe Alexandra	4–0	Crook Town	26 November 1932
13	Luton Town	2–2	Kingstonian	26 November 1932
Replay	Kingstonian	2–3	Luton Town	30 November 1932
14	Swindon Town	4–1	Dulwich Hamlet	26 November 1932
15	Doncaster Rovers	4–1	Gainsborough Trinity	26 November 1932
16	Wrexham	3–0	Spennymoor United	26 November 1932
17	Tranmere Rovers	3–0	New Brighton	26 November 1932
18	Accrington Stanley	2–1	Hereford United	26 November 1932
19	Northampton Town	8–1	Lloyds (Sittingbourne)	26 November 1932
20	Carlisle United	1–0	Denaby United	26 November 1932
21	Clapton Orient	0–1	Aldershot	26 November 1932
22	Crystal Palace	1–2	Brighton & Hove Albion	26 November 1932
23	Southend United	1–1	Exeter City	26 November 1932
Replay	Exeter City	0–1	Southend United	30 November 1932
24	Cardiff City	1–1	Bristol Rovers	26 November 1932
Replay	Bristol Rovers	4–1	Cardiff City	30 November 1932
25	Merthyr Town	1–1	Queens Park Rangers	26 November 1932
Replay	Queens Park Rangers	5–1	Merthyr Town	1 December 1932
26	Halifax Town	2–0	Darwen	26 November 1932
27	Stalybridge Celtic	2–8	Hull City	26 November 1932
28	Newport County	4–2	Ilford	26 November 1932
29	Margate	5–0	Ryde Sports	26 November 1932
30	Southport	3–3	Nelson	26 November 1932
Replay	Nelson	0–4	Southport	29 November 1932
31	Torquay United	0–0	Bournemouth & Boscombe Athletic	26 November 1932
Replay	Bournemouth & Boscombe Athletic	2–2	Torquay United	30 November 1932
Replay	Torquay United	3–2	Bournemouth & Boscombe Athletic	5 December 1932
32	Workington	5–1	Scunthorpe & Lindsey United	26 November 1932
33	York City	1–3	Scarborough	26 November 1932
34	Guildford City	1–2	Coventry City	26 November 1932

== Second round proper ==
The matches were played on Saturday, 10 December 1932. Six matches were drawn, with replays taking place in the following midweek fixture. Of these, one game went to a second replay.

Tie no	Home team	Score	Away team	Date
1	Chester	2–1	Yeovil & Petter's United	10 December 1932
2	Bristol City	2–2	Tranmere Rovers	10 December 1932
Replay	Tranmere Rovers	3–2	Bristol City	14 December 1932
3	Reading	2–2	Coventry City	10 December 1932
Replay	Coventry City	3–3	Reading	15 December 1932
Replay	Reading	1–0	Coventry City	19 December 1932
4	Walsall	2–1	Hartlepools United	10 December 1932
5	Folkestone	2–1	Newport County	10 December 1932
6	Crewe Alexandra	0–2	Darlington	10 December 1932
7	Stockport County	2–3	Luton Town	10 December 1932
8	Accrington Stanley	1–2	Aldershot	10 December 1932
9	Bristol Rovers	1–1	Gillingham	10 December 1932
Replay	Gillingham	1–3	Bristol Rovers	14 December 1932
10	Northampton Town	0–1	Doncaster Rovers	10 December 1932
11	Brighton & Hove Albion	0–0	Wrexham	10 December 1932
Replay	Wrexham	2–3	Brighton & Hove Albion	14 December 1932
12	Carlisle United	1–1	Hull City	10 December 1932
Replay	Hull City	2–1	Carlisle United	15 December 1932
13	Southend United	4–1	Scarborough	10 December 1932
14	Halifax Town	2–1	Workington	10 December 1932
15	Southport	1–2	Swindon Town	10 December 1932
16	Torquay United	1–1	Queens Park Rangers	10 December 1932
Replay	Queens Park Rangers	3–1	Torquay United	15 December 1932
17	Gateshead	5–2	Margate	10 December 1932

== Third round proper ==
The 44 First and Second Division clubs entered the competition at this stage, along with Barnsley, Watford and amateur club Corinthian.

The matches were scheduled for Saturday, 14 January 1933, with the exception of the Millwall–Reading game, which was played four days after. Seven matches were drawn and went to replays in the following midweek fixture. Folkestone was the last non-league club from the qualifying rounds remaining in the competition, but they went out in this round (as did Corinthian).

Tie no	Home team	Score	Away team	Date
1	Birmingham	2–1	Preston North End	14 January 1933
2	Blackpool	2–1	Port Vale	14 January 1933
3	Chester	5–0	Fulham	14 January 1933
4	Darlington	2–0	Queens Park Rangers	14 January 1933
5	Bury	2–2	Nottingham Forest	14 January 1933
Replay	Nottingham Forest	1–2	Bury	18 January 1933
6	Watford	1–1	Southend United	14 January 1933
Replay	Southend United	2–0	Watford	18 January 1933
7	Walsall	2–0	Arsenal	14 January 1933
8	Leicester City	2–3	Everton	14 January 1933
9	Sheffield Wednesday	2–2	Chesterfield	14 January 1933
Replay	Chesterfield	4–2	Sheffield Wednesday	18 January 1933
10	Grimsby Town	3–2	Portsmouth	14 January 1933
11	Wolverhampton Wanderers	3–6	Derby County	14 January 1933
12	West Bromwich Albion	2–0	Liverpool	14 January 1933
13	Lincoln City	1–5	Blackburn Rovers	14 January 1933
14	Swindon Town	1–2	Burnley	14 January 1933
15	Doncaster Rovers	0–3	Halifax Town	14 January 1933
16	Tranmere Rovers	2–1	Notts County	14 January 1933
17	Newcastle United	0–3	Leeds United	14 January 1933
18	Barnsley	0–0	Luton Town	14 January 1933
Replay	Luton Town	2–0	Barnsley	18 January 1933
19	Brighton & Hove Albion	2–1	Chelsea	14 January 1933
20	Manchester United	1–4	Middlesbrough	14 January 1933
21	Bradford City	2–2	Aston Villa	14 January 1933
Replay	Aston Villa	2–1	Bradford City	18 January 1933
22	Millwall	1–1	Reading	18 January 1933
Replay	Reading	0–2	Millwall	23 January 1933
23	Hull City	0–2	Sunderland	14 January 1933
24	Oldham Athletic	0–6	Tottenham Hotspur	14 January 1933
25	Bradford Park Avenue	5–1	Plymouth Argyle	14 January 1933
26	Huddersfield Town	2–0	Folkestone	14 January 1933
27	Swansea Town	2–3	Sheffield United	14 January 1933
28	Charlton Athletic	1–5	Bolton Wanderers	14 January 1933
29	Corinthian	0–2	West Ham United	14 January 1933
30	Stoke City	1–0	Southampton	14 January 1933
31	Aldershot	1–0	Bristol Rovers	14 January 1933
32	Gateshead	1–1	Manchester City	14 January 1933
Replay	Manchester City	9–0	Gateshead	18 January 1933

== Fourth round proper ==
The matches were scheduled for Saturday, 28 January 1933. Two games were drawn and went to replays in the following midweek fixture.

Tie no	Home team	Score	Away team	Date
1	Birmingham	3–0	Blackburn Rovers	28 January 1933
2	Blackpool	2–0	Huddersfield Town	28 January 1933
3	Chester	0–0	Halifax Town	28 January 1933
Replay	Halifax Town	3–2	Chester	2 February 1933
4	Darlington	0–2	Chesterfield	28 January 1933
5	Burnley	3–1	Sheffield United	28 January 1933
6	Aston Villa	0–3	Sunderland	28 January 1933
7	Bolton Wanderers	2–1	Grimsby Town	28 January 1933
8	Middlesbrough	4–1	Stoke City	28 January 1933
9	Luton Town	2–0	Tottenham Hotspur	28 January 1933
10	Everton	3–1	Bury	28 January 1933
11	Tranmere Rovers	0–0	Leeds United	28 January 1933
Replay	Leeds United	4–0	Tranmere Rovers	1 February 1933
12	Manchester City	2–0	Walsall	28 January 1933
13	West Ham United	2–0	West Bromwich Albion	28 January 1933
14	Brighton & Hove Albion	2–1	Bradford Park Avenue	28 January 1933
15	Southend United	2–3	Derby County	28 January 1933
16	Aldershot	1–0	Millwall	28 January 1933

== Fifth round proper ==
The matches were scheduled for Saturday, 18 February 1933. There were two replays, played in the next midweek fixture.

Tie no	Home team	Score	Away team	Date
1	Burnley	1–0	Chesterfield	18 February 1933
2	Bolton Wanderers	2–4	Manchester City	18 February 1933
3	Middlesbrough	0–0	Birmingham	18 February 1933
Replay	Birmingham	3–0	Middlesbrough	22 February 1933
4	Sunderland	1–0	Blackpool	18 February 1933
5	Derby County	2–0	Aldershot	18 February 1933
6	Everton	2–0	Leeds United	18 February 1933
7	Brighton & Hove Albion	2–2	West Ham United	18 February 1933
Replay	West Ham United	1–0	Brighton & Hove Albion	22 February 1933
8	Halifax Town	0–2	Luton Town	18 February 1933

== Sixth round proper ==
The four Sixth Round ties were scheduled to be played on Saturday, 4 March 1933. There was one replay, between Sunderland and Derby County, played in the following midweek fixture.

Tie no	Home team	Score	Away team	Date
1	Burnley	0–1	Manchester City	4 March 1933
2	Derby County	4–4	Sunderland	4 March 1933
Replay	Sunderland	0–1	Derby County	8 March 1933
3	Everton	6–0	Luton Town	4 March 1933
4	West Ham United	4–0	Birmingham	4 March 1933

== Semi-finals ==
The semi-final matches were played on Saturday, 18 March 1933. Manchester City and Everton won their matches to meet in the final at Wembley.

18 March 1933
15:00

Everton	2–1	West Ham United

Molineux, Wolverhampton

18 March 1933
15:00

Manchester City	3–2	Derby County

Leeds Road, Huddersfield

== Final ==
The 1933 FA Cup Final was contested by Manchester City and Everton at Wembley on 29 April 1933. Everton won the game for the second time in their history, the previous time coming in 1906.

=== Match details ===
29 April 1933
15:00 BST

Everton	3–0	Manchester City
Stein 41'; Dean 52'; Dunn 80'

Wembley, London
Attendance: 92,950
Referee: E. Wood

Everton	Manchester City

== See also ==
- FA Cup Final Results 1872-
