= List of Tamworth F.C. seasons =

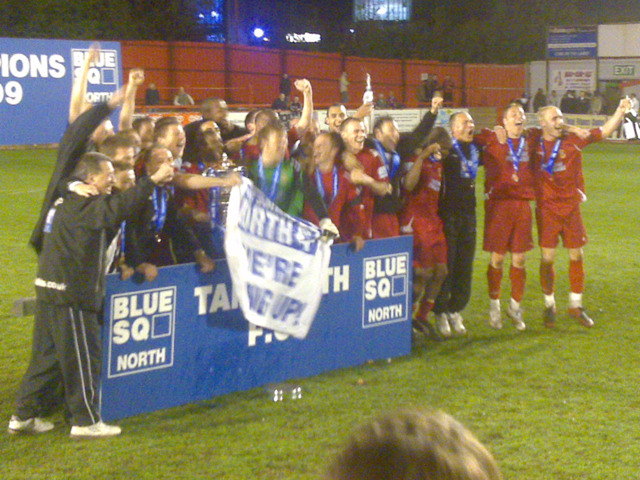
The Lambs celebrating a promotion back into the Conference Premier.

Tamworth Football Club, an association football club based in Tamworth, Staffordshire, was founded in 1933.

== Key ==
- P = Played
- W = Games won
- D = Games drawn
- L = Games lost
- F = Goals for
- A = Goals against
- Pts = Points
- Pos = Final position
- B'ham Combination = Birmingham Combination
- B'ham North Div = Birmingham & District Northern
- B'ham Div 1 = Birmingham & District Division 1
- B'ham Div 2 = Birmingham & District Division 2
- South Mid = Southern Midland Division
- South Prem = Southern Premier Division
- Conf North = Conference North
- Conf Prem = Conference Premier
- F = Final
- Group = Group stage
- R16 = Round of 16
- QF = Quarter-finals
- QR1 = First qualifying round
- QR2 = Second qualifying round
- QR3 = Third qualifying round
- QR4 = Fourth qualifying round
- QR5 = Fifth qualifying round
- R1 = Round 1
- R2 = Round 2
- R3 = Round 3
- R4 = Round 4
- R5 = Round 5
- R6 = Round 6
- SF = Semi-finals

1st or W	Winners
2nd or RU	Runners-up
3rd	Third
↑	Promoted
↓	Relegated
♦	Top scorer in division

== Seasons ==
Results of league and cup competitions by season
Season	League									FA Cup	FA Trophy	Senior Cup		Other		Top goalscorer	
Season	Division	P	W	D	L	F	A	Pts	Pos	FA Cup	FA Trophy	B'ham	Staffs	Competition	Result	Name	Goals
1933–34	B'ham Combination	34	8	4	22	77	112	20	16th			—	—	—	—	Wakelin (Note: This is the top scorer's surname, their first name is unknown or to be confirmed.)	18
1934–35	B'ham Combination	32	16	5	11	88	58	37	6th			R2	—	—	—	Percy Vials	36
1935–36	B'ham Combination	36	22	2	12	118	65	46	5th			R2	—	—	—	Percy Vials	48
1936–37	B'ham Combination	38	21	5	12	124	85	47	5th			—	—	—	—	Percy Vials	68
1937–38	B'ham Combination	38	20	8	10	119	71	48	4th			—	—	—	—		
1938–39	B'ham Combination	38	22	7	9	112	64	51	5th			—	—	—	—		
1939–40	B'ham Combination	18	8	3	7	54	60	19	6th			—	—	—	—		
1940–45	First-class football was suspended between 1940 and 1945 due to the Second World War.																
1945–46	B'ham Combination	32	9	5	18	76	108	23	16th	QR1		—	—	—	—		
1946–47	B'ham Combination	36	18	5	13	88	68	41	6th	QR2		—	—	—	—		
1947–48	B'ham Combination	38	24	5	9	96	63	53	4th	QR2		—	—	—	—		
1948–49	B'ham Combination	38	19	10	9	96	57	48	6th	QR1		—	—	—	—		
1949–50	B'ham Combination	38	16	12	10	80	61	44	7th	QR1		—	—	—	—		
1950–51	B'ham Combination	38	16	3	19	92	98	35	10th	PR		—	—	—	—		
1951–52	B'ham Combination	38	18	6	14	92	91	42	6th	QR1		—	—	—	—		
1952–53	B'ham Combination	34	11	8	15	55	64	30	14th	PR		—	—	—	—		
1953–54	B'ham Combination	26	11	5	10	53	48	27	7th	QR1		—	—	—	—		
1954–55	B'ham North Div	38	13	8	17	67	75	34	15th	PR		—	—	—	—		
1955–56	B'ham Div 2 ↑	36	26	5	5	107	46	57	1st	QR1		—	—	—	—		
1956–57	B'ham Div 1	38	20	9	9	94	62	49	3rd	QR2		—	—	—	—		
1957–58	B'ham Div 1	38	14	7	17	57	57	35	12th	PR		—	—	—	—		
1958–59	B'ham Div 1	34	15	8	11	51	58	38	5th	QR2		—	—	—	—		
1959–60	B'ham Div 1	34	15	4	15	55	52	34	8th	QR1		—	—	—	—		
1960–61	B'ham	42	20	7	15	86	71	47	9th	QR2		—	—	—	—		
1961–62	B'ham	40	21	7	12	91	63	49	6th	QR1		—	—	—	—		
1962–63	West Midlands	38	15	8	15	69	69	38	11th	QR2		—	—	—	—		
1963–64	West Midlands	36	29	2	5	88	35	60	1st	QR3		—	—	—	—		
1964–65	West Midlands	38	24	4	10	101	69	52	5th	QR2		—	—	—	—		
1965–66	WM Premier	40	29	7	4	123	51	65	1st	QR1		—	—	—	—		
1966–67	WM Premier	42	22	9	11	90	59	53	5th	R1		—	—	—	—		
1967–68	WM Premier	42	25	11	6	101	44	61	2nd	QR3		—	—	—	—		
1968–69	WM Premier	38	27	5	6	109	41	59	2nd	QR1		W	—	—	—	Graham Jessop	46
1969–70	WM Premier	36	23	7	6	101	50	53	4th	R2	R1	—	—	—	—		
1970–71	WM Premier	36	23	6	7	80	41	52	4th	R1	R4	—	—	—	—		
1971–72	WM Premier ↑	36	25	7	4	81	38	57	1st	QR4	R1	—	—	—	—		
1972–73	South Div 1 North	42	14	8	20	45	65	36	18th	QR1	R1	—	—	—	—		
1973–74	South Div 1 North	42	13	11	18	42	51	37	15th	QR4	R1	—	—	—	—		
1974–75	South Div 1 North	42	21	8	13	74	53	50	7th	QR2	QR3	—	—	—	—		
1975–76	South Div 1 North	42	18	11	13	65	43	47	8th	QR1	QR2	—	—	—	—		
1976–77	South Div 1 North	38	11	13	14	49	58	35	14th	QR1	PR	—	—	—	—		
1977–78	South Div 1 North	38	10	11	17	37	48	31	17th	QR1	QR1	—	—	—	—		
1978–79	South Div 1 North	38	15	8	15	47	45	38	11th	QR2	PR	—	—	—	—		
1979–80	Northern Premier	42	8	9	25	26	77	25	22nd	QR1	PR	—	—	—	—		
1980–81	Northern Premier	42	9	12	21	38	76	30	22nd	QR2	PR	—	—	—	—		
1981–82	Northern Premier	42	10	9	23	31	56	29	19th	QR2	QR1	—	—	—	—		
1982–83	Northern Premier ↓	42	7	8	27	44	97	29	20th	QR2	QR1	—	—	—	—		
1983–84	Southern Midlands ↓	38	2	7	29	25	118	13	20th	QR1	QR2	—	—	—	—		
1984–85	WM Premier	38	16	14	8	66	38	46	7th	QR1	QR3	—	—	—	—		
1985–86	WM Premier	38	15	8	15	68	52	38	9th	QR3		—	—	FA Vase	R5		
1986–87	WM Premier	38	21	4	13	103	47	46	5th	QR1		—	—	FA Vase	R4		
1987–88	WM Premier ↑	34	27	3	4	98	31	57	1st	R1		—	—	FA Vase	R5		
1988–89	Southern Midlands	42	26	9	7	85	45	87	3rd	QR3		—	—	FA Vase	W		
1989–90	Southern Midlands	42	22	8	12	82	70	74	4th	QR3	QR2	—	—	—	—		
1990–91	Southern Midlands	42	25	5	12	84	45	80	4th	R1	QR2	—	—	—	—		
1991–92	Southern Midlands	42	16	11	15	65	51	59	4th	QR4	QR1	—	—	—	—		
1992–93	Southern Midlands	42	16	11	15	65	51	59	10th	QR1	QR1	—	—	—	—		
1993–94	Southern Midlands	42	19	7	16	82	68	64	7th	PR	QR2	—	—	—	—		
1994–95	Southern Midlands	42	24	8	10	98	70	80	3rd	QR1	QR1	—	—	—	—		
1995–96	Southern Midlands	42	22	3	17	97	64	69	6th	QR2	QR3	R3	R3	—	—	Mark Whitehouse	21
1996–97	Southern Midlands ↑	40	30	7	3	90	28	97	1st	QR3	QR1	RU	R2	—	—	Ian Bennett	32
1997–98	South Premier	42	14	11	17	68	65	53	15th	QR1	QR3	R2	RU	—	—	Gary Piggott	23
1998–99	South Premier	42	19	5	18	62	67	62	9th	R1	R2	R3	R1	—	—	Warren Haughton	18
1999–2000	South Premier	42	20	10	12	80	51	70	6th	R1	R3	R4	RU	—	—	Mark Hallam	44
2000–01	South Premier	42	17	8	17	58	55	59	12th	QR3	R3	—	R1	—	—	Warren Haughton	25
2001–02	South Premier	42	24	13	5	81	41	85	2nd	R1	R3	R2	W	—	—	Darren Roberts	24
2002–03	South Premier ↑	42	26	10	6	73	32	88	1st	QR4	RU	R4	R2	—	—	Mark Cooper	18
2003–04	Conf Premier	42	13	10	19	49	68	49	17th	QR4	R5	QF	QF	—	—	Mark Cooper	15
2004–05	Conf Premier	42	14	11	17	53	63	50 (Note: Tamworth were deducted 3 points for breaching League rules.)	15th	R1	R4	R1	R1	Conference Cup	R4	Bob Taylor	19
2005–06	Conf Premier	42	8	14	20	32	63	38	20th	R3	R3	R1	R1	—	—	Jake Edwards	7
2006–07	Conf Premier ↓	46	13	9	24	43	61	48	22nd	R3	R2	—	—	—	—	Taiwo Atieno	12
2007–08	Conf North	42	13	11	18	53	59	50	15th	QR4	R4	—	—	Conference League Cup	R4	Nick Wright	15
2008–09	Conf North ↑	42	24	13	5	70	41	85	1st	QR4	QR3	—	—	Conference League Cup	R2	Gareth Sheldon	23
2009–10	Conf Premier	44 (Note: Following Chester City's expulsion from the Football Conference, their results were expunged, meaning the league season was reduced from 46 games to 44.)	11	16	17	42	52	49	16th	QR4	QF	R1	—	—	—	Bradley Pritchard	7
2010–11	Conf Premier	46	12	13	21	62	83	49	19th	R2	R1	R1	—	—	—	Kyle Perry	9
2011–12	Conf Premier	46	11	15	20	47	70	48	18th	R3	R1	QF	—	—	—	Iyseden Christie	11
2012–13	Conf Premier	46	15	10	21	55	69	55	19th	QR4	R3	R1	—	—	—	Adam Cunnington	21
2013–14	Conf Premier ↓	46	10	9	27	43	81	39	23rd	R2	R4	RU	—	—	—	Richard Peniket	7
2014–15	Conf North	42	19	12	11	66	57	69	7th	QR4	QR3	R1	—	—	—	Shane Clarke; David Hibbert; Kayden Jackson	8
2015–16	NL North	42	16	15	11	55	45	63	7th	QR2	R1	—	—	—	—	Elliott Durrell	13
2016–17	NL North	42	21	6	15	73	67	69	9th	QR2	QR3	—	—	—	—	Danny Newton	28
2017–18	NL North ↓	42	11	9	22	55	77	42	21st	QR2	QR3	—	—	—	—	Darryl Knights; Reece Styche	10
2018–19	South Prem Central	42	15	13	14	64	46	58	12th	QR1	QR2	R2	QF	Southern Football League Cup	R1	Chris Lait	14
2019–20	South Prem Central	30	21	3	7	63	27	65	1st (Note: The 2019–20 season was terminated on 26 March 2020 due to the COVID-19 pandemic; Tamworth were in first place in the standings at the time of the termination, but were not recognised as champions.)	QR4	QR2	SF	R2	Southern Football League Cup	R1	Ryan Beswick	15
2020–21	South Prem Central	7	3	3	1	13	8	12	5th (Note: As a result of the COVID-19 pandemic, this season's Southern Football League was formally abandoned, with all results from the season being expunged, and no promotion or relegation taking place.)	QR1	R1	—	—	—	—	Shaquille McDonald	6
2021–22	South Prem Central	40	14	12	14	58	58	54	10th	QR4	R2	QF	—	Southern Football League Cup	PR		
2022–23	South Prem Central ↑	42	27	8	7	93	40	89	1st	QR2	R4	R2	—	—	—		
2023–24	NL North ↑	46	29	9	8	74	29	96	1st	QR4	R2	R2	—	—	—		
2024–25	National League	46	17	13	16	65	72	64	10th	R3	R4	W	—	National League Cup	Group		
2025–26	National League	46	17	11	18	63	71	62	11th	R1	R5	Finalist	—	National League Cup	SF		
