= List of Kidderminster Harriers F.C. seasons =

The table below is a list of Kidderminster Harriers F.C. seasons from the formation of the club in 1886 to the most recent completed season. The list details the club's achievements in all first-team competitions and records their top league goalscorer and average home league attendance, where known.

Based in Kidderminster, Worcestershire, they are the only club from Worcestershire ever to have played in the Football League, winning promotion from the Conference in 2000 and spending five seasons in the fourth tier until relegation in 2005. Their highest league finish is 10th in the 2001–02 season.

In addition to the club's time in the Football League, over the course of 125 completed seasons (up to the 2023–24 season) Kidderminster Harriers have competed in 59 seasons of the Birmingham & District League/West Midlands (Regional) League (1889–1940, 1947–48 and 1960–72), two seasons in the Birmingham Combination (1945–47), 23 seasons in the Southern League (1948–60 and 1972–83), 29 seasons in what is currently known as the National League (1983–2000, 2005–16 and 2023–24) and seven seasons in the National League North (2016–23 and 2024–present).

As of the 2024–25 season, the club participates in the National League North, at step two of non-league and the sixth tier of English football.

== Key ==
Key to divisions

APL	Alliance Premier League
BC	Birmingham Combination
Bham	Birmingham League
Conf	Football Conference
Div 3	Third Division
Lge 2	League Two
Mid	Midland League
Nat	National League
Nat N	National League North
SL	Southern Football League
SL1	Southern League Division One
SL1N	Southern League Division One North
SLP	Southern League Premier Division
SLM	Southern League Midlands
SLNW	Southern League North West
WM	West Midlands (Regional) League
WMP	West Midlands (Regional) League Premier Division

Key to league position
colour codes and symbols

1st	League champions but no promotion gained
(↑)	Promoted as champions
(↑)	Promoted
	Lost in play-offs
(↓)	Relegated

Key to cup colour codes
and rounds

W	Winners
F	Finalists / runners-up
SF	Semi-finals
QF	Quarter-finals
R1	First round, etc.
R1^{(S)}	Southern section first round, etc
R1^{(N)}	Northern section first round, etc
1Q	First round qualifying, etc.
IR	Intermediate round
PR	Preliminary round

== Seasons ==
Season	League											Cup				Top goalscorer (Note: Goals in all competitions are counted.)		Avg. att. (Note: Average attendance taken from league matches only. Data prior to 1983 is unavailable.)
Season	∆	Division	P	W	D	L	F	A	Pts	Pos	PO	FAC (Note: The expansion of the FA Cup, from 15 clubs in its inaugural season to currently more than 700 has meant successive changes in the competition's structure. Teams in the top two divisions were made exempt from the qualifying stages and the first two rounds of the Cup in 1925–26. Because of this, rounds were renamed; the fifth and sixth qualifying rounds became first and second round proper. Since 1914–15 there have been a total of 14 rounds, in comparison to 9 in 1888–89.)	Lge (Note: Southern League Cup 1972–1983, Bob Lord Challenge Trophy 1983–2000, Football League Cup 2000–2005 and Conference League Cup 2007–2009.)	FAT	Other (Note: Welsh Cup 1934–1993 and EFL Trophy 2000–2006.)	Player	Gls	Avg. att.
1889–90	–	Bham (Note: Kdderminster were founder members of the Birmingham & District League in 1889. The 11 clubs competing alongside the Harriers in the league's inaugural season were Aston Victoria, Great Bridge Unity, Hednesford Town, Ironbridge, Kidderminster Olympic, Langley Green Victoria, Oldbury Town, Smethwick Carriage Works, Unity Gas Department, Wellington St George's and Willenhall Pickwick.)	21	13	2	6	75	38	28	2nd (Note: Rivals Kidderminster Olympic topped the final table but no championship was awarded as a number of fixtures had not been completed. Harriers did not compete in the following season, returning in 1891–92.)	–	–	–	–	–	–	–	–
1891–92	–	Bham	15	5	4	6	25	30	14	5th (Note: The 1891–92 Birmingham & District League season was again incomplete as a number of fixtures were not played.)	–	–	–	–	–	–	–	–
1892–93	–	Bham	18	5	6	7	33	41	16	7th	–	–	–	–	–	–	–	–
1893–94	–	Bham	26	6	1	19	36	82	13	14th	–	–	–	–	–	–	–	–
1894–95	–	Bham	30	10	6	14	64	74	26	11th	–	–	–	–	–	–	–	–
1895–96	–	Bham	30	11	7	12	44	41	29	8th	–	–	–	–	–	–	–	–
1896–97	–	Bham	30	10	8	12	52	45	28	10th	–	–	–	–	–	–	–	–
1897–98	–	Bham	30	6	2	22	31	96	14	16th	–	–	–	–	–	–	–	–
1898–99	–	Bham	34	11	4	19	45	85	26	15th	–	–	–	–	–	–	–	–
1899–1900	–	Bham	30	11	6	13	47	74	28	10th	–	–	–	–	–	–	–	–
1900–01	–	Bham	34	9	2	23	44	110	20	17th	–	–	–	–	–	–	–	–
1901–02	–	Bham	34	5	4	25	38	109	14	18th	–	–	–	–	–	–	–	–
1902–03	–	Bham	34	12	6	16	70	68	30	13th	–	IR	–	–	–	–	–	–
1903–04	–	Bham	34	12	6	16	57	66	30	12th	–	–	–	–	–	–	–	–
1904–05	–	Bham	34	17	10	7	54	32	44	3rd	–	–	–	–	–	–	–	–
1905–06	–	Bham	34	12	6	16	42	51	30	13th	–	–	–	–	–	–	–	–
1906–07	–	Bham	34	18	7	9	69	44	43	3rd	–	R1	–	–	–	–	–	–
1907–08	–	Bham	34	16	5	13	55	64	37	7th	–	–	–	–	–	–	–	–
1908–09	–	Bham	34	13	6	15	58	85	32	7th	–	–	–	–	–	–	–	–
1909–10	–	Bham	34	9	6	19	52	83	24	14th	–	–	–	–	–	–	–	–
1910–11	–	Bham	34	6	8	20	37	66	20	17th	–	–	–	–	–	–	–	–
1911–12	–	Bham	34	15	6	13	55	53	36	8th	–	–	–	–	–	–	–	–
1912–13	–	Bham	34	9	5	20	39	63	23	17th	–	–	–	–	–	–	–	–
1913–14	–	Bham	34	11	8	15	61	85	30	12th	–	–	–	–	–	–	–	–
1914–15	–	Bham	34	9	6	19	61	95	24	13th	–	–	–	–	–	–	–	–
1915–19	All competitive league and cup football were suspended until after the First World War.																	
1919–20	–	Bham	34	11	7	16	55	76	29	15th	–	–	–	–	–	–	–	–
1920–21	–	Bham	34	8	7	19	46	67	23	16th	–	–	–	–	–	–	–	–
1921–22	–	Bham	34	13	2	19	40	82	28	15th	–	–	–	–	–	–	–	–
1922–23	–	Bham	34	8	6	20	37	71	22	16th	–	–	–	–	–	–	–	–
1923–24	–	Bham	34	12	5	17	44	60	29	15th	–	–	–	–	–	–	–	–
1924–25	–	Bham	34	21	4	9	71	37	46	2nd	–	–	–	–	–	–	–	–
1925–26	–	Bham	34	16	5	13	75	68	37	6th	–	–	–	–	–	–	–	–
1926–27	–	Bham	34	19	7	8	79	49	45	3rd	–	3Q	–	–	–	–	–	–
1927–28	–	Bham	34	10	11	13	57	74	31	10th	–	–	–	–	–	–	–	–
1928–29	–	Bham	34	12	10	12	78	76	34	12th	–	–	–	–	–	–	–	–
1929–30	–	Bham	34	16	6	12	68	70	38	7th	–	–	–	–	–	–	–	–
1930–31	–	Bham	34	12	8	14	73	72	32	10th	–	–	–	–	–	–	–	–
1931–32	–	Bham	34	13	4	17	67	66	30	12th	–	–	–	–	–	–	–	–
1932–33	–	Bham	34	10	5	19	65	87	25	14th	–	–	–	–	–	–	–	–
1933–34	–	Bham	38	23	5	10	115	75	51	3rd	–	–	–	–	–	–	–	–
1934–35	–	Bham	36	25	2	9	100	49	52	2nd	–	–	–	–	R4 (Note: Entered the Welsh Cup for the first time in 1934–35, losing 2-0 to Shrewsbury Town in the fourth round.)	–	–	–
1935–36	–	Bham	38	24	5	9	104	66	53	4th	–	R2	–	–	R3 (Note: Kidderminster withdrew from the Welsh Cup in 1935–36 before third round tie with Bala Town.)	Billy Boswell	64	–
1936–37	–	Bham	35	18	4	3	90	54	40	7th	–	4Q	–	–	QF	–	–	–
1937–38	–	Bham	26	17	9	0	60	22	43	1st	–	R1	–	–	R3	–	–	–
1938–39	–	Bham	36	30	3	3	127	32	63	1st (Note: Due to the number of teams having dropped dramatically, the 1938–39 season consisted of two separate "half-season" leagues. The Keys Cup was contested until Christmas and the League Cup for the remainder of the season. Kidderminster won both titles, with a W16–D1–L1 record in the Keys Cup and a W14–D2–L2 record in the League Cup.)	–	R1	–	–	R3 (Note: Kidderminster were dismissed from the Welsh Cup in 1938–39 before their third round tie, handing Hereford United a walkover.)	–	–	–
1939–40	–	Bham	11	3	3	5	22	31	9	n/a (Note: The 1939–40 season was abandoned due to the outbreak of the Second World War and the league did not resume operations until 1945. Kidderminster were in 5th place when the season ended.)	–	–	–	–	–	–	–	–
1940–45	All competitive league and cup football were suspended until after the Second World War.																	
1945–46	–	BC (Note: Kidderminster joined the Birmingham Combination for the 1945–46 season.)	32	15	6	11	75	57	36	6th	–	4Q	–	–	–	–	–	–
1946–47	–	BC	36	16	4	16	104	84	36	11th	–	4Q	–	–	–	–	–	–
1947–48	–	Bham (Note: Re-joined the Birmingham & District League for the 1947–48 season.)	26	15	5	6	72	43	35	2nd	–	4Q	–	–	–	–	–	–
1948–49	–	SL (Note: Harriers joined the Southern League for the 1948–49 season.)	42	19	6	17	77	94	44	10th	–	R1	–	–	–	–	–	–
1949–50	–	SL	46	12	11	23	64	108	35	23rd	–	PQ	–	–	–	–	–	–
1950–51	–	SL	44	13	9	22	58	103	35	21st	–	1Q	–	–	–	–	–	–
1951–52	–	SL	42	22	10	10	70	40	54	3rd	–	3Q	–	–	–	–	–	–
1952–53	–	SL	42	12	5	25	54	88	29	21st	–	R1	–	–	R5	–	–	–
1953–54	–	SL	42	18	9	15	62	59	45	5th	–	4Q	–	–	R4	–	–	–
1954–55	–	SL	42	18	7	17	84	89	43	11th	–	1Q	–	–	–	–	–	–
1955–56	–	SL	42	14	7	21	86	108	35	16th	–	3Q	–	–	–	–	–	–
1956–57	–	SL	42	7	10	25	60	83	20 (Note: Deducted four points in the 1956–57 season for fielding ineligible players.)	21st	–	2Q	–	–	–	–	–	–
1957–58	–	SL	42	10	10	22	60	101	30	21st	–	PQ	–	–	–	–	–	–
1958–59	–	SLNW	34	7	3	24	42	94	17	17th	–	1Q	–	–	R3	–	–	–
1959–60	–	SL1	42	14	6	22	59	97	34	19th	–	2Q	–	–	–	–	–	–
1960–61	–	Bham	42	23	7	12	99	58	53	6th	–	3Q	–	–	–	–	–	–
1961–62	–	Bham	40	24	6	10	102	58	54	5th	–	2Q	–	–	–	–	–	–
1962–63	–	WM (Note: The Birmingham & District League was renamed as West Midlands (Regional) League in 1962.)	38	20	8	10	88	53	48	6th	–	2Q	–	–	–	–	–	–
1963–64	–	WM	36	24	3	9	108	45	51	2nd	–	3Q	–	–	–	–	–	–
1964–65	–	WM	38	30	6	2	124	37	66	1st	–	R1	–	–	–	–	–	–
1965–66	–	WMP (Note: Re-structuring of the league saw a Premier League created for the West Midlands (Regional) League. Kidderminster were placed in the Premier League.)	40	22	8	10	85	54	52	4th	–	R1	–	–	–	–	–	–
1966–67	–	WMP	42	31	5	6	123	61	67	2nd	–	4Q	–	–	–	–	–	–
1967–68	–	WMP	42	26	9	7	102	45	61	3rd	–	R1	–	–	–	–	–	–
1968–69	–	WMP	38	32	4	2	123	25	68	1st	–	R1	–	–	–	–	–	–
1969–70	–	WMP	36	26	7	3	115	34	59	1st	–	4Q	–	R2	–	–	–	–
1970–71	–	WMP	36	26	6	4	90	31	58	1st	–	4Q	–	R3	–	–	–	–
1971–72	–	WMP	36	23	7	6	84	32	53	3rd	–	1Q	–	R2	–	–	–	–
1972–73	–	SL1N (Note: Kidderminster joined the Southern League Division One North for the 1972–73 season.)	42	19	12	11	67	56	50	5th	–	PQ	(Note: Kidderminster competed in the Southern League Cup but performance data is not available.)	R1	–	–	–	–
1973–74	–	SL1N	42	15	14	13	67	53	44	10th	–	1Q		R1	R1	–	–	–
1974–75	–	SL1N	42	12	11	19	50	66	35	16th	–	4Q		3Q	R4	–	–	–
1975–76	–	SL1N	42	13	8	21	54	70	34	18th	–	PQ		R1	R4	–	–	–
1976–77	–	SL1N	38	17	6	15	74	65	40	8th	–	PQ		R1	R1	–	–	–
1977–78	–	SL1N	38	16	11	11	68	41	43	7th	–	3Q		3Q	QF	–	–	–
1978–79	–	SL1N	38	13	14	11	70	60	40	9th	–	2Q		R1	R4	–	–	–
1979–80	6	SLM (Note: The Southern League was re-organised following the creation of the Alliance Premier League with Southern and Midland Divisions created. Kidderminster were placed in the Midland Division.)	42	23	6	13	81	59	52	4th	–	R1	W	R1	QF	–	–	–
1980–81	6	SLM	42	23	9	10	67	41	55	4th	–	R1		R1	R2	–	–	–
1981–82	6	SLM	42	22	12	8	71	40	56	3rd	–	1Q		QF	R1	–	–	–
1982–83	6	SLP (Note: The Southern League was re-organised again to re-establish a Premier League, where Kidderminster were placed.)	38	23	7	8	69	40	76	2nd (↑)	–	3Q		R1	R4	–	–	–
1983–84	5	APL	42	14	14	14	54	61	49	10th	–	2Q	QF	R3	QF	–	–	605
1984–85	5	APL	42	17	8	17	79	77	51	8th	–	4Q	QF	R1	R2	–	–	676
1985–86	5	APL	42	24	7	11	99	62	67	3rd	–	4Q	R2	QF	F (Note: Beaten 2–1 by Wrexham in the Welsh Cup final replay at Aggborough. The original tie had resulted in a 1–1 draw at the Racecourse Ground.)	Kim Casey	73	762
1986–87	5	Conf (Note: The Alliance Premier League was renamed Football Conference in 1986.)	42	17	4	21	77	81	55	12th	–	4Q	R1	W (Note: Harriers beat Burton Albion 2–1 in FA Trophy final replay at The Hawthorns. The original tie ended in a 0–0 draw at Wembley Stadium.)	R3	Kim Casey	43	1,091
1987–88	5	Conf	42	18	15	9	75	66	69	7th	–	R2	R1	R2	SF (Note: Beaten 5–3 on aggregate by Wrexham in the Welsh Cup semi-final.)	–	–	1,345
1988–89	5	Conf	40	21	6	13	68	57	69	5th	–	4Q	QF	R3	F (Note: Beaten 5–0 by Swansea City in the Welsh Cup final at the Vetch Field.)	–	–	1,504
1989–90	5	Conf	42	15	9	18	64	67	54	13th	–	R1	F (Note: Kidderminster beaten 4–1 on aggregate by Yeovil Town in the final of the Bob Lord Challenge Trophy.)	QF	R4	–	–	1,415
1990–91	5	Conf	42	14	10	18	56	67	52	13th	–	R1	SF	F (Note: Kidderminster beaten 2–1 by Wycombe Wanderers in FA Trophy final at Wembley Stadium.)	R2	–	–	1,197
1991–92	5	Conf	42	12	9	21	56	77	45	19th	–	R1	QF	R3	R4	–	–	1,303
1992–93	5	Conf	42	14	16	12	60	60	58	9th	–	R1	QF	R1	R3	–	–	1,439
1993–94	5	Conf	42	22	9	11	63	35	75	1st (Note: Despite winning the Conference title, promotion was denied in 1994 due to Aggborough's facilities not deemed being up to Football League standard.)	–	R5	QF	R1	–	–	–	2,250
1994–95	5	Conf	42	16	9	17	63	61	57	11th	–	R1	(Note: Kidderminster competed in the Bob Lord Challenge Trophy but performance data is not available.)	F (Note: Kidderminster beaten 2–1 after extra-time by Woking in FA Trophy final at Wembley Stadium.)	–	–	–	1,959
1995–96	5	Conf	42	18	10	14	78	66	64	7th	–	R4		R1	–	Kim Casey	17	2,020
1996–97	5	Conf	42	26	7	9	84	42	85	2nd	–	R1	W (Note: Harriers beat Macclesfield Town on away goals after 1–1 aggregate score in the two-legged Bob Lord Challenge Trophy final.)	R3	–	Lee Hughes	34	2,660
1997–98	5	Conf	42	11	14	17	56	63	47	17th	–	4Q	R2	R2	–	Mike Bignall	16	2,023
1998–99	5	Conf	42	14	9	19	56	52	51	15th	–	R1	R2	R2	–	Leroy May	11	1,944
1999–2000	5	Conf	42	26	7	9	75	40	85	1st (↑)	–	4Q		R2	–	Ian Foster	17	2,854
2000–01	4	Div 3	46	13	14	19	47	61	53	16th	–	R2	R1	–	R2^{(N)}	John Durnin	9	3,422
2001–02	4	Div 3	46	19	9	18	56	47	66	10th	–	R1	R1	–	R2^{(N)}	Four players (Note: Dean Bennett, Drewe Broughton, Ian Foster and Bo Henriksen joint top scorers in 2001–02 with eight goals.)	8	2,984
2002–03	4	Div 3	46	16	15	15	62	63	63	11th	–	R1	R1	–	QF^{(S)}	Bo Henriksen	20	2,895
2003–04	4	Div 3	46	14	13	19	45	59	55	16th	–	R3	R1	–	R1^{(S)}	Dean Bennett	7	2,980
2004–05	4	Lge 2 (Note: The Third Division was renamed and rebranded League Two from the start of the 2004–05 season, along with the Championship and League One.)	46	10	8	28	39	85	38	23rd (↓)	–	R1	R1	–	R1^{(S)}	Two players (Note: Ian Foster and Blair Sturrock joint top scorers in 2004–05 with six goals.)	6	2,785
2005–06	5	Conf	42	13	11	18	39	55	50	15th	–	4Q	–	R2	SF^{(N)}	Iyseden Christie	10	1,775
2006–07	5	Conf	42	17	12	17	43	50	63	10th	–	R1	–	F (Note: Kidderminster beaten 3–2 by Stevenage Borough in FA Trophy final. The game was the first competitive match to be played at the new Wembley Stadium in front of a record competition crowd of 53,262.)	–	Iyseden Christie	9	1,624
2007–08	5	Conf	46	19	10	17	74	57	67	13th	–	R2	R5	R2	–	Iyseden Christie	17	1,556
2008–09	5	Conf	46	23	10	13	69	48	79	6th	–	R3	R3	R3	–	Matthew Barnes-Homer	20	1,688
2009–10	5	Conf	44	15	12	17	57	52	57	13th	–	4Q	–	SF	–	Brian Smikle	12	1,557
2010–11	5	Conf	46	20	17	9	74	60	72 (Note: Club were deducted five points in the 2010–11 season for submitting misleading financial information. Ultimately, this didn't cost the club a place in the play-offs, as they were six points adrift of Fleetwood Town in fifth place.)	6th	–	4Q	–	R1	–	Chris McPhee	17	1,631
2011–12	5	Conf	46	22	10	14	82	63	76	6th	–	4Q	–	R3	–	Nick Wright	15	2,095
2012–13	5	Conf	46	28	9	9	82	40	93	2nd	SF (Note: Lost 5–2 on aggregate to Wrexham in the play-off semi-final.)	R1	–	R2	–	Anthony Malbon	19	2,197
2013–14	5	Conf	46	20	12	14	66	59	72	7th	–	R4	–	R1	–	Michael Gash	11	2,035
2014–15	5	Conf	46	15	12	19	51	60	57	16th	–	4Q	–	R2	–	Marvin Johnson	9	1,910
2015–16	5	Nat (Note: The Football Conference was rebranded and renamed the National League in 2015.)	46	9	13	24	49	71	40	23rd (↓)	–	4Q	–	R1	–	Two players (Note: James McQuilkin and Ben Whitfield joint top scorers in 2015–16 with six goals.)	6	1,804
2016–17	6	Nat N	42	25	7	10	76	41	82	2nd	SF (Note: Lost 2–1 on aggregate to Chorley in the play-off semi-final.)	R1	–	R3	–	Arthur Gnahoua	12	1,837
2017–18	6	Nat N	42	20	12	10	76	50	72	4th	QF (Note: Beaten 2–0 in the play-off quarter-final by Bradford (Park Avenue).)	R1	–	R2	–	Joe Ironside	19	1,837
2018–19	6	Nat N	42	17	9	16	68	62	60	10th	–	3Q	–	3Q	–	Ashley Chambers	14	1,622
2019–20	6	Nat N	33	10	8	15	39	43	38	15th (Note: The 2019–20 National League season was ended prematurely due to the COVID-19 pandemic with the final standings determined by point-per-game ratios.)	–	2Q	–	3Q	–	Ashley Chambers	13	1,362
2020–21	6	Nat N	15	7	4	4	24	17	25	n/a (Note: The 2020–21 National League season was declared null and void due to the COVID-19 pandemic, and all results were expunged with no teams promoted or relegated. Kidderminster were in 5th place when the league was stopped.)	–	2Q	–	R2	–	Ashley Hemmings	6	–
2021–22	6	Nat N	42	21	11	10	72	35	74	4th	QF (Note: Beaten 2–1 by Boston United in the play-off quarter-final at Aggborough.)	R4	–	R3	–	Ashley Hemmings	16	2,126
2022–23	6	Nat N	46	19	12	15	49	42	69	6th (↑)	W (Note: Promoted via play-offs following 2–0 win over Brackley Town in the final. Alfreton Town and Kings Lynn Town were beaten in the quarter-final and semi-final respectively.)	4Q	–	R4	–	Ashley Hemmings	14	2,237
2023–24	5	Nat	46	11	13	22	40	59	46	22nd (↓)	–	R1	–	R5	–	Ashley Hemmings	10	2,856
2024–25	6	Nat N	46	27	8	11	86	37	89	3rd	SF (Note: Beaten 2–1 by Chester FC in the play-off semi-final at Aggborough.)	4Q	–	R5	–	Ashley Hemmings	33	2,602
