= Atherstone Town F.C. =

Association football club in England

Coordinates: 52°35′04.5″N 1°32′53.1″W

Atherstone Town Community
- Full name: Atherstone Town Community Football Club
- Nickname: The Adders
- Founded: 1887, 1979, 2004
- Ground: Sheepy Road, Atherstone
- Chairman: Maria Beale
- Manager: Mitch Thomson
- League: United Counties League Premier Division South
- 2024–25: Midland League Premier Division, 3rd of 18 (transferred)
- Website: atherstonetown.com
Home colours	Away colours

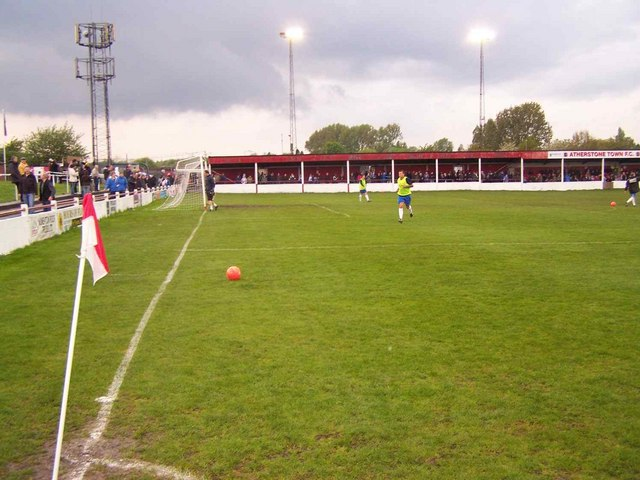
Sheepy Road in 2009

Atherstone Town Community Football Club is a football club based in Atherstone, Warwickshire, England. They are currently members of the United Counties League Premier Division South and play at Sheepy Road.

== History ==
The original club was formed in 1887. They reached the semi-finals of the FA Amateur Cup in 1907–08, losing 3–0 to Stockton. The following season saw them reach the semi-final stage again, this time losing 3–0 to Clapton. After playing in several local leagues, they joined the Birmingham Combination in 1911, and were runners-up in their first season in the league. The club finished bottom of the league in 1923–24 and again in 1928–29. Following World War II, they were league champions in 1947–48, also winning the Birmingham Senior Cup. When the Combination folded in 1954, all but one of the clubs joined the Birmingham & District League, with Atherstone placed in the transitional Northern Division. A fourteenth-place finish in 1954–55 saw them placed in Division Two for the following season. They went on to finish as runners-up in Division Two, and were promoted to Division One.

Atherstone finished bottom of Division One in 1957–58 and were relegated back to Division Two. However, they finished third in Division Two the following season and were promoted to Division One. The league was reduced to a single division in 1960, and was renamed the West Midlands (Regional) League in 1962. When it expanded in 1965, Atherstone became members of the Premier Division. They were runners-up in the division in 1971–72 and were promoted to Division One North of the Southern League. After finishing as runners-up in Division One North the following season, the club were promoted to the Premier Division, where they remained until folding at the end of the 1978–79 season.

The club was immediately reformed as Atherstone United, taking the reserve team's place in Division One of the West Midlands (Regional) League. They were Division One champions in 1981–82, earning promotion to the Premier Division. After winning the Premier Division title in 1986–87, the club were promoted to the Midland Division of the Southern League. The following season saw them reach the first round of the FA Cup for the first time, eventually losing 2–0 to VS Rugby in a first round replay. They were Midland Division runners-up in 1988–89, securing promotion to the Premier Division. In 1990–91 the club reached the FA Cup first round again; after beating Fleetwood Town 3–1 in the first round, they lost 1–0 at Third Division Crewe Alexandra in the second round. Another FA Cup first round appearance the following season saw them hold Fourth Division Hereford United to a 0–0 draw at Sheepy Road, before losing the replay at Edgar Street 3–0.

Atherstone finished bottom of the Southern League Premier Division in 1999–2000 season and were relegated to the Western Division. They subsequently folded midway through the 2003–04 season. The club was then reformed under the name Atherstone Town, joining Division One of the Midland Combination for the 2004–05 season. After winning Division One and the President's Cup in their first season, they were Premier Division champions and League Cup winners in 2005–06 and were promoted to the Midland Alliance. The club were Midland Alliance champions in 2007–08, earning promotion to Division One Midlands of the Southern League. In 2008–09 they finished third in the division, qualifying for the promotion play-offs, but lost the semi-final 5–0 to Chasetown

Division One Midlands was renamed Division One Central in 2010, and Atherstone were relegated back to the Midland Alliance at the end of the 2010–11 season after finishing second-from-bottom of the division. They suffered a second successive relegation after finishing second-from-bottom of the Midland Alliance the following season, returning to the Premier Division of the Midland Combination. When the Combination merged with the Midland Alliance to form the Midland League in 2014, Atherstone were placed in Division One. In 2021–22 they were Division One champions, earning promotion to the Premier Division.

=== Season-by-season record ===
Season	Division	Pos	Notes
1911–12	Birmingham Combination	2/16	
1912–13	Birmingham Combination	7/16	
1913–14	Birmingham Combination	13/16	
1914–15	Birmingham Combination	11/16	
1919–20	Birmingham Combination	14/16	
1920–21	Birmingham Combination	10/18	
1921–22	Birmingham Combination	11/16	
1922–23	Birmingham Combination	14/15	
1923–24	Birmingham Combination	18/18	
1924–25	Birmingham Combination	13/18	
1925–26	Birmingham Combination	14/18	
1926–27	Birmingham Combination	13/18	
1927–28	Birmingham Combination	13/18	
1928–29	Birmingham Combination	18/18	
1929–30	Birmingham Combination	11/18	
1930–31	Birmingham Combination	10/18	
1931–32	Birmingham Combination	6/18	
1932–33	Birmingham Combination	6/18	
1933–34	Birmingham Combination	11/18	
1934–35	Birmingham Combination	11/17	
1935–36	Birmingham Combination	15/19	
1936–37	Birmingham Combination	15/20	
1937–38	Birmingham Combination	14/20	
1938–39	Birmingham Combination	18/20	
1945–46	Birmingham Combination	4/17	
1946–47	Birmingham Combination	5/19	
1947–48	Birmingham Combination	1/20	Champions
1948–49	Birmingham Combination	17/20	
1949–50	Birmingham Combination	4/20	
1950–51	Birmingham Combination	13/20	
1951–52	Birmingham Combination	19/20	
1952–53	Birmingham Combination	6/18	
1953–54	Birmingham Combination	3/14	
1954–55	Birmingham & District League Northern Division	14/20	
1955–56	Birmingham & District League Division Two	2/19	Promoted
1956–57	Birmingham & District League Division One	12/20	
1957–58	Birmingham & District League Division One	20/20	Relegated
1958–59	Birmingham & District League Division Two	3/20	Promoted
1959–60	Birmingham & District League Division One	10/18	
1960–61	Birmingham & District League	8/22	
1961–62	Birmingham & District League	15/21	
1962–63	West Midlands (Regional) League	5/20	
1963–64	West Midlands (Regional) League	10/19	
1964–65	West Midlands (Regional) League	17/20	
1965–66	West Midlands (Regional) League Premier Division	15/21	
1966–67	West Midlands (Regional) League Premier Division	11/22	
1967–68	West Midlands (Regional) League Premier Division	9/22	
1968–69	West Midlands (Regional) League Premier Division	5/20	
1969–70	West Midlands (Regional) League Premier Division	6/19	
1970–71	West Midlands (Regional) League Premier Division	7/19	
1971–72	West Midlands (Regional) League Premier Division	2/19	Promoted
1972–73	Southern League Division One North	2/22	Promoted
1973–74	Southern League Premier Division	11/22	
1974–75	Southern League Premier Division	14/22	
1975–76	Southern League Premier Division	3/22	
1976–77	Southern League Premier Division	16/22	
1977–78	Southern League Premier Division	16/22	
1978–79	Southern League Premier Division	16/22	Folded
1979–80	West Midlands (Regional) League Division One	5/19	
1980–81	West Midlands (Regional) League Division One	3/22	
1981–82	West Midlands (Regional) League Division One	1/20	Promoted
1982–83	West Midlands (Regional) League Premier Division	5/20	
1983–84	West Midlands (Regional) League Premier Division	3/20	
1984–85	West Midlands (Regional) League Premier Division	3/20	
1985–86	West Midlands (Regional) League Premier Division	3/20	
1986–87	West Midlands (Regional) League Premier Division	1/20	Promoted
1987–88	Southern League Midland Division	4/22	
1988–89	Southern League Midland Division	2/22	Promoted
1989–90	Southern League Premier Division	6/22	
1990–91	Southern League Premier Division	15/22	
1991–92	Southern League Premier Division	13/22	
1992–93	Southern League Premier Division	15/21	
1993–94	Southern League Premier Division	4/22	
1994–95	Southern League Premier Division	16/22	
1995–96	Southern League Premier Division	17/22	
1996–97	Southern League Premier Division	11/22	
1997–98	Southern League Premier Division	9/22	
1998–99	Southern League Premier Division	16/22	
1999–2000	Southern League Premier Division	22/22	Relegated
2000–01	Southern League Western Division	9/22	
2001–02	Southern League Western Division	9/21	
2002–03	Southern League Western Division	20/22	
2003–04	Southern League Western Division	–	Folded
2004–05	Midland Combination Division One	1/18	Promoted
2005–06	Midland Combination Premier Division	1/22	Promoted
2006–07	Midland Alliance	8/22	
2007–08	Midland Alliance	1/22	Promoted
2008–09	Southern League Division One Midlands	3/22	
2009–10	Southern League Division One Midlands	13/22	
2010–11	Southern League Division One Central	21/22	Relegated
2011–12	Midland Alliance	21/22	Relegated
2012–13	Midland Combination Premier Division	9/18	
2013–14	Midland Combination Premier Division	5/18	
2014–15	Midland League Division One	13/20	
2015–16	Midland League Division One	13/20	
2016–17	Midland League Division One	4/20	
2017–18	Midland League Division One	3/22	
2018–19	Midland League Division One	3/19	

== Honours ==
- Midland Alliance
  - Champions 2007–08
- Midland League
  - Division One champions 2021–22
- West Midlands (Regional) League
  - Premier Division champions 1986–87
  - Division One champions 1981–82
- Midland Combination
  - Premier Division champions 2005–06
  - Division One champions 2004–05
  - League Cup winners 2005–06
  - President's Cup winners 2004–05
- Birmingham Combination
  - Champions 1947–48
- Birmingham Senior Cup
  - Winners 1947–48, 1974–75
- Walsall Senior Cup
  - Winners 1969–70, 1983–84

== Records ==
- Best FA Cup performance: Second round, 1990–91
- Best FA Amateur Cup performance: Semi-finals, 1907–08, 1908–09
- Best FA Trophy performance: Third round, 1975–76, 1977–78
- Best FA Vase performance: Quarter-finals, 1982–83, 2019–20, 2022–23

== See also ==
- Atherstone Town F.C. players
- Atherstone Town F.C. managers
