= 1998–99 Bob Lord Challenge Trophy =

Tournament details
- Country: England

Final positions
- Champions: Doncaster Rovers (1st title)
- Runners-up: Farnborough Town

The 1998–99 Bob Lord Challenge Trophy, known as the Endsleigh Brokers Challenge Trophy for sponsorship reasons, was a football tournament for clubs competing in that season's Football Conference. Doncaster Rovers beat Farnborough Town 4–0 in the final, played over two legs.

== Results ==
=== First round ===
Home team	Score	Away team	Attendance
Kettering Town	0-3	Hayes	651
Barrow	2-1	Leek Town	891
Dover Athletic	2-3	Stevenage Borough	605

Home team	Score	Away team	Attendance
Farnborough Town	4-2	Kingstonian	540
Forest Green Rovers	2-4	Kidderminster Harriers	446
Southport	2-1	Telford United	634

=== Second round ===
Home team	Score	Away team	Attendance
Hayes	3-2	Welling United	227
Morecambe	2-0	Barrow	567
Stevenage Borough	0-1	Cheltenham Town	604
Doncaster Rovers	2-0	Southport	947

Home team	Score	Away team	Attendance
Hednesford Town	1–3	Northwich Victoria	318
Farnborough Town	3-1	Rushden & Diamonds	313
Kidderminster Harriers	1–2	Hereford United	645
Woking	3-0	Yeovil Town	580

=== Quarter-finals ===
Home team	Score	Away team	Attendance
Cheltenham Town	2-1	Hayes	469
Doncaster Rovers	3-2	Northwich Victoria	1877

Home team	Score	Away team	Attendance
Farnborough Town	4-3	Woking	592
Hereford United	3-2	Morecambe	567

=== Semi-finals ===
Played over two legs although only one leg of the Farnborough v Cheltenham tie was played.

Home team	Score	Away team	Attendance
Farnborough Town	2-0	Cheltenham Town	260

Home team	Score	Away team	Attendance
Doncaster Rovers	1-2; 3-0	Morecambe	1302; 3297

=== Final ===
Played over two legs

Home team	Score	Away team	Attendance
Farnborough Town	0-1	Doncaster Rovers	643

Home team	Score	Away team	Attendance
Doncaster Rovers	3-0	Farnborough Town	7160
