= 1981–82 West Midlands (Regional) League =

The 1981–82 West Midlands (Regional) League season was the 82nd in the history of the West Midlands (Regional) League, an English association football competition for semi-professional and amateur teams based in the West Midlands county, Shropshire, Herefordshire, Worcestershire and southern Staffordshire.

== Premier Division ==
West Midlands League Premier Division
- Season: 1981–82
- Champions: Shifnal Town
- Matches: 462
- Goals: 1,301 (2.82 per match)

The Premier Division featured 21 clubs which competed in the division last season, along with one club, promoted from Division One:

- Oldswinford

=== League table ===
Pos	Team	Pld	W	D	L	GF	GA	GD	Pts	Promotion or relegation
1	Shifnal Town	42	26	11	5	82	36	+46	63	
2	Sutton Coldfield Town	42	26	9	7	80	43	+37	61	Joined the Southern League
3	Halesowen Town	42	24	8	10	84	45	+39	56	
4	Bilston	42	23	8	11	70	49	+21	54	
5	Ledbury Town	42	19	14	9	83	58	+25	52	
6	Rushall Olympic	42	16	18	8	72	54	+18	50	
7	Willenhall Town	42	18	11	13	64	46	+18	47	Joined the Southern League
8	VS Rugby	42	20	7	15	67	51	+16	47	
9	Blakenall	42	20	7	15	59	53	+6	47	
10	Dudley Town	42	17	12	13	61	52	+9	46	Joined the Southern League
11	Wednesfield Social	42	15	13	14	43	42	+1	43	
12	Lye Town	42	15	12	15	59	49	+10	42	
13	Hednesford Town	42	17	8	17	61	57	+4	42	
14	Coventry Sporting	42	13	11	18	43	54	−11	37	
15	Gresley Rovers	42	13	9	20	50	59	−9	35	
16	Hinckley Athletic	42	12	10	20	43	66	−23	34	
17	Tividale	42	13	6	23	56	82	−26	32	
18	Malvern Town	42	11	10	21	49	78	−29	32	
19	Armitage	42	10	11	21	43	69	−26	31	
20	Oldswinford	42	9	11	22	48	74	−26	29	
21	Brereton Social	42	7	10	25	47	100	−53	24	
22	Darlaston	40	6	8	26	37	84	−47	20	Relegated to Division One

Source: nonleaguematters
Rules for classification: 1) points; 2) goal difference; 3) number of goals scored.
