= Gary Piggott =

English footballer

Personal information
- Full name: Gary David Piggott
- Date of birth: 1 April 1969 (age 57)
- Place of birth: Warley, England
- Position: Forward

Senior career*
Years	Team	Apps	(Gls)
- Dudley Town
1991–1992	West Bromwich Albion	5	(0)
1992–1993	Shrewsbury Town	4	(0)
- Willenhall Town
- Tamworth
Total		9	(0)
- * Club domestic league appearances and goals

Gary Piggott (born 1 April 1969) is an English former professional footballer who played as a forward.
