= 1986–87 West Midlands (Regional) League =

The 1986–87 West Midlands (Regional) League season was the 87th in the history of the West Midlands (Regional) League, an English association football competition for semi-professional and amateur teams based in the West Midlands county, Shropshire, Herefordshire, Worcestershire and southern Staffordshire.

== Premier Division ==
West Midlands League Premier Division
- Season: 1986–87
- Champions: Atherstone United
- Promoted: Atherstone United
- Matches: 380
- Goals: 1,297 (3.41 per match)

The Premier Division featured 18 clubs which competed in the division last season, along with two new clubs :

- Halesowen Harriers, promoted from Division One
- Oldbury United, relegated from the Southern League

=== League table ===
Pos	Team	Pld	W	D	L	GF	GA	GD	Pts	Promotion or relegation
1	Atherstone United	38	29	4	5	115	30	+85	62	Promoted to the Southern League
2	Oldbury United	38	28	5	5	89	28	+61	61	
3	Wednesfield Social	38	26	5	7	80	32	+48	57	
4	Gresley Rovers	38	23	11	4	73	39	+34	57	
5	Tamworth	38	21	4	13	103	47	+56	46	
6	Malvern Town	38	20	6	12	74	51	+23	46	
7	Halesowen Harriers	38	19	6	13	75	51	+24	44	
8	Hinckley Athletic	38	18	6	14	70	67	+3	42	
9	Chasetown	38	12	15	11	64	63	+1	39	
10	Harrisons	35	15	5	15	60	56	+4	35	
11	GKN Sankeys	38	13	12	13	73	69	+4	38	
12	Rushall Olympic	38	13	8	17	60	63	−3	34	
13	Lye Town	38	12	9	17	41	56	−15	33	
14	Brereton Social	38	14	5	19	61	80	−19	33	
15	Tividale	38	12	8	18	54	71	−17	32	
16	Wolverhampton United	38	11	8	19	44	63	−19	30	
17	Oldswinford	38	7	8	23	49	93	−44	22	
18	Tipton Town	38	5	8	25	37	109	−72	18	
19	Armitage	38	5	5	28	37	113	−76	15	Resigned from the league
20	Blakenall	38	4	5	29	38	116	−78	13	

Source: nonleaguematters
Rules for classification: 1) points; 2) goal difference; 3) number of goals scored.
