= 1971–72 West Midlands (Regional) League =

The 1971–72 West Midlands (Regional) League season was the 72nd in the history of the West Midlands (Regional) League, an English association football competition for semi-professional and amateur teams based in the West Midlands county, Shropshire, Herefordshire, Worcestershire and southern Staffordshire.

== Premier Division ==
West Midlands League Premier Division
- Season: 1971–72
- Champions: Tamworth
- Promoted: six clubs
- Matches: 342
- Goals: 1,052 (3.08 per match)

The Premier Division featured 17 clubs which competed in the division last season, along with two new clubs:

- GKN Sankeys, promoted from Division One
- Warley, transferred from the Midland Football League

Also, Redditch changed name to Redditch United.

=== League table ===
| Pos | Team | Pld | W | D | L | GF | GA | GR | Pts | Promotion or relegation |
|---|---|---|---|---|---|---|---|---|---|---|
| 1 | Tamworth | 36 | 25 | 7 | 4 | 81 | 38 | 2.132 | 57 | Promoted to the Southern Football League |
| 2 | Atherstone Town | 36 | 24 | 7 | 5 | 74 | 32 | 2.313 | 55 | Promoted to the Southern Football League |
| 3 | Kidderminster Harriers | 36 | 23 | 7 | 6 | 84 | 32 | 2.625 | 53 | Promoted to the Southern Football League |
| 4 | Bromsgrove Rovers | 36 | 22 | 8 | 6 | 74 | 39 | 1.897 | 52 | Promoted to the Southern Football League |
| 5 | Bilston | 36 | 16 | 9 | 11 | 63 | 37 | 1.703 | 41 | |
| 6 | Redditch United | 36 | 17 | 6 | 13 | 75 | 59 | 1.271 | 40 | Promoted to the Southern Football League |
| 7 | Lye Town | 36 | 14 | 10 | 12 | 52 | 46 | 1.130 | 38 | |
| 8 | Hednesford | 36 | 16 | 6 | 14 | 65 | 59 | 1.102 | 38 | Transferred to the Midland Football League |
| 9 | Dudley Town | 36 | 13 | 12 | 11 | 37 | 36 | 1.028 | 38 | |
| 10 | Bedworth United | 36 | 14 | 8 | 14 | 72 | 64 | 1.125 | 36 | Promoted to the Southern Football League |
| 11 | Eastwood Hanley | 36 | 13 | 9 | 14 | 51 | 58 | 0.879 | 35 | |
| 12 | Lower Gornal Athletic | 36 | 13 | 6 | 17 | 47 | 60 | 0.783 | 32 | |
| 13 | GKN Sankeys | 36 | 10 | 10 | 16 | 38 | 63 | 0.603 | 30 | |
| 14 | Warley | 36 | 13 | 3 | 20 | 56 | 75 | 0.747 | 29 | |
| 15 | Brierley Hill Alliance | 36 | 11 | 6 | 19 | 47 | 58 | 0.810 | 28 | |
| 16 | Wolverhampton Wanderers "A" | 36 | 7 | 11 | 18 | 35 | 68 | 0.515 | 25 | |
| 17 | Darlaston | 36 | 6 | 11 | 19 | 34 | 68 | 0.500 | 23 | |
| 18 | Halesowen Town | 36 | 3 | 12 | 21 | 41 | 77 | 0.532 | 18 | |
| 19 | Hinckley Athletic | 36 | 4 | 8 | 24 | 26 | 83 | 0.313 | 16 | |

Source: nonleaguematters
Rules for classification: 1) points; 2) goal ratio.
