= 1966–67 West Midlands (Regional) League =

Football league season

The 1966–67 West Midlands (Regional) League season was the 67th in the history of the West Midlands (Regional) League, an English association football competition for semi-professional and amateur teams based in the West Midlands county, Shropshire, Herefordshire, Worcestershire and southern Staffordshire.

== Premier Division ==
West Midlands League Premier Division
- Season: 1966–67
- Champions: Boston United
- Matches: 462
- Goals: 1,644 (3.56 per match)

The Premier Division featured 19 clubs which competed in the division last season, along with three new clubs:

- Boston United, transferred from the United Counties League
- Coventry City "A"
- Shrewsbury Town reserves

=== League table ===
Pos	Team	Pld	W	D	L	GF	GA	GR	Pts	Promotion or relegation
1	Boston United	42	32	6	4	139	42	3.310	70	
2	Kidderminster Harriers	42	31	5	6	123	61	2.016	67	
3	Darlaston	42	22	14	6	80	44	1.818	58	
4	Stourbridge	42	24	8	10	97	62	1.565	56	
5	Tamworth	42	22	9	11	90	59	1.525	53	
6	Halesowen Town	42	22	8	12	94	66	1.424	52	
7	Dudley Town	42	22	7	13	70	50	1.400	51	
8	Bromsgrove Rovers	42	22	5	15	74	70	1.057	49	
9	Bilston	42	20	7	15	88	94	0.936	47	
10	Stratford Town Amateurs	42	17	12	13	70	69	1.014	46	
11	Atherstone Town	42	17	7	18	75	82	0.915	41	
12	Lower Gornal Athletic	42	17	6	19	73	66	1.106	40	
13	Brierley Hill Alliance	42	15	8	19	66	75	0.880	38	
14	Hednesford	42	14	7	21	65	87	0.747	35	
15	Coventry City "A"	44	12	10	22	72	78	0.923	34	
16	Port Vale reserves	42	11	9	22	65	93	0.699	31	
17	Cinderford Town	42	12	6	24	65	92	0.707	30	
18	Redditch	42	9	10	23	36	81	0.444	28	
19	Shrewsbury Town reserves	42	11	5	26	66	98	0.673	27	Resigned from the league
20	Bedworth United	42	10	7	25	50	95	0.526	27	
21	Wolverhampton Wanderers "A"	42	6	13	23	38	74	0.514	25	
22	Lye Town	42	7	5	30	48	106	0.453	19	

Source: nonleaguematters
Rules for classification: 1) points; 2) goal ratio.
