= 1963–64 West Midlands (Regional) League =

West Midlands (Regional) League
- Season: 1963–64
- Champions: Tamworth
- Matches: 342
- Goals: 1,293 (3.78 per match)

The 1963–64 West Midlands (Regional) League season was the 64th in the history of the West Midlands (Regional) League, an English association football competition for semi-professional and amateur teams based in the West Midlands county, Shropshire, Herefordshire, Worcestershire and southern Staffordshire.

== Clubs ==
The league featured 18 clubs from the previous season, along with one new club:

- Lower Gornal Athletic, joined from the Worcestershire Combination

=== League table ===
Pos	Team	Pld	W	D	L	GF	GA	GR	Pts
1	Tamworth	36	29	2	5	88	35	2.514	60
2	Kidderminster Harriers	36	24	3	9	108	45	2.400	51
3	Halesowen Town	36	22	5	9	105	52	2.019	49
4	Bromsgrove Rovers	36	19	9	8	94	55	1.709	47
5	Dudley Town	36	19	7	10	90	63	1.429	45
6	Stourbridge	36	18	7	11	76	61	1.246	43
7	Hednesford	36	18	7	11	77	63	1.222	43
8	Bilston	36	14	11	11	70	60	1.167	39
9	Banbury Spencer	36	16	6	14	65	59	1.102	38
10	Atherstone Town	36	12	12	12	73	67	1.090	36
11	Brierley Hill Alliance	36	14	8	14	47	49	0.959	36
12	Lower Gornal Athletic	36	12	10	14	60	69	0.870	34
13	Lye Town	36	12	7	17	60	71	0.845	31
14	Darlaston	36	12	7	17	67	84	0.798	31
15	Stratford Town	36	11	7	18	48	78	0.615	29
16	Redditch	36	10	7	19	44	75	0.587	27
17	Moor Green	36	7	7	22	44	90	0.489	21
18	Bedworth United	36	3	8	25	36	106	0.340	14
19	Sutton Town	36	2	6	28	41	101	0.406	10

Source: nonleaguematters
Rules for classification: 1) points; 2) goal ratio.
