= 1964–65 West Midlands (Regional) League =

West Midlands (Regional) League
- Season: 1964–65
- Champions: Kidderminster Harriers
- Matches: 380
- Goals: 1,508 (3.97 per match)

The 1964–65 West Midlands (Regional) League season was the 65th in the history of the West Midlands (Regional) League, an English association football competition for semi-professional and amateur teams based in the West Midlands county, Shropshire, Herefordshire, Worcestershire and southern Staffordshire.

At the end of the season the second division was introduced. It was made up largely of reserve sides of non-league clubs, the majority of which were in the league’s new ‘Premier Division’.

== Clubs ==
The league featured 18 clubs from the previous season, along with one new club:

- Walsall reserves

Also, Sutton Town changed name to Sutton Coldfield Town and Stratford Town changed name to Stratford Town Amateurs.

=== League table ===
Pos	Team	Pld	W	D	L	GF	GA	GR	Pts	Promotion or relegation
1	Kidderminster Harriers	38	30	6	2	124	37	3.351	66	
2	Halesowen Town	38	26	4	8	107	52	2.058	56	
3	Dudley Town	38	27	1	10	103	42	2.452	55	
4	Lower Gornal Athletic	38	23	6	9	74	50	1.480	52	
5	Tamworth	38	24	4	10	101	69	1.464	52	
6	Brierley Hill Alliance	38	23	4	11	87	58	1.500	50	
7	Stourbridge	38	18	10	10	81	56	1.446	46	
8	Bromsgrove Rovers	38	19	8	11	76	60	1.267	46	
9	Walsall reserves	38	21	4	13	75	61	1.230	46	
10	Bilston	38	18	4	16	75	67	1.119	40	
11	Hednesford	38	16	6	16	75	61	1.230	38	
12	Redditch	38	13	8	17	55	56	0.982	34	
13	Stratford Town Amateurs	38	10	9	19	68	80	0.850	29	
14	Lye Town	38	11	4	23	64	104	0.615	26	
15	Banbury Spencer	38	11	3	24	79	99	0.798	25	
16	Darlaston	38	8	9	21	69	112	0.616	25	
17	Atherstone Town	38	8	4	26	59	121	0.488	20	
18	Bedworth United	38	8	3	27	39	95	0.411	19	
19	Moor Green	38	7	4	27	44	108	0.407	18	Relegated to the Worcestershire Combination
20	Sutton Coldfield Town	38	4	9	25	53	120	0.442	17	Relegated to the Worcestershire Combination

Source: nonleaguematters
Rules for classification: 1) points; 2) goal ratio.
