= Birmingham Combination =

- Founded: 1892
- Folded: 1954
- Country: England
- Divisions: 1
- Feeder to: Birmingham & District League
- Last champions: Rugby Town (1953–54)
- Most championships: Bournville Athletic (6)
- Current: 1953-54

The Birmingham Combination was an English football competition for teams in Birmingham and the surrounding areas, which was active from 1892 until 1954. It was founded as the Birmingham & District Junior League, and changed its name in 1908. The league was also affiliated to the Birmingham County F.A. Winners of the league would have had to have been elected to the Birmingham & District League in order to gain promotion.

== History ==
The competition was formed in 1892, three years after the Birmingham & District League, to cater for those clubs which held "junior" membership of the Birmingham County Football Association, and was thus initially called the Birmingham & District Junior League. The eight founder member clubs were Aston St James, Bournbrook, Bournville, Ellen Street Victoria, Hamstead, Kings Heath Albion, Park Mills, and Soho Villa.

By 1908, the league's status and area of coverage had grown significantly and it changed its name to the Birmingham Combination. At this time the Combination acted as a "feeder" league to the Birmingham & District League. The Combination attracted the top four teams of the Walsall and District League, Willenhall Swifts, Darlaston, Bilston United and Hednesford Town, as well as Wednesbury Old Athletic, who all moved to the Birmingham Junior League for the beginning of the season.

The league welcomed Walsall as they became the first local Football League club to enter a team in the competition when in 1923 they entered their reserve team, they were followed in 1928 by Birmingham, in 1932 by Wolverhampton Wanderers and in 1933 by West Bromwich Albion. Aston Villa were the last of the local league sides to enter a team, doing so in 1935. By the 1930s it had grown in prestige and had come to be regarded as the stronger of the two leagues.

In 1952 the Birmingham & District League, which had by now regained its status as the top league in the area, suggested a merger between the two competitions, but the Combination rejected the idea. Several of the Combination's top teams then defected to its rival. The depleted Combination then revived the idea of a merger but it was rejected and, when all bar one of the Combination's remaining clubs jumped to the League in 1954, the Combination was effectively absorbed by the League.

== Champions ==
The champions of the league were as follows:

Season	Champions
1892–93	Soho Villa
1893–94	Coombs Wood
1894–95	Lozells
1895–96	Bournbrook
1896–97	Bournbrook
1897–98	Bournville Athletic
1898–99	Bournville Athletic
1899–1900	Bournville Athletic
1900–01	Bournville Athletic
1901–02	Bournville Athletic
1902–03	Bournville Athletic
1903–04	Foleshill Great Heath
1904–05	Coombs Wood Tube Works
1905–06	Coombs Wood Tube Works
1906–07	Nuneaton Town
1907–08	Darlaston
1908–09	Willenhall Pickwick
1909–10	Hednesford Town
1910–11	Darlaston
1911–12	Cradley Heath St Lukes
1912–13	Stafford Rangers
1913–14	Redditch
1914–15	Nuneaton Town
No competition between 1915 and 1919 due to the First World War
1919–20	Cradley Heath St Lukes
1920–21	Cannock Town
1921–22	Cradley Heath St Lukes
1922–23	Oakengates Town
1923–24	Hinckley United
1924–25	Bloxwich Strollers
1925–26	Leamington Town
1926–27	Hinckley United
1927–28	Walsall Reserves
1928–29	Nuneaton Town
1929–30	Market Harborough Town
1930–31	Nuneaton Town
1931–32	Birmingham "A"
1932–33	Redditch
1933–34	Dudley Town
1934–35	Wolverhampton Wanderers "A"
1935–36	Aston Villa "A"
1936–37	Walsall Reserves
1937–38	Darlaston
1938–39	Aston Villa "A"
No competition between 1939 and 1945 due to the Second World War
1945–46	Darlaston
1946–47	Bromsgrove Rovers
1947–48	Atherstone Town
1948–49	Bedworth Town
1949–50	Bedworth Town
1950–51	Hednesford Town
1951–52	Stourbridge
1952–53	Redditch
1953–54	Rugby Town
