= 1975–76 FA Cup qualifying rounds =

Tournament details
- Country: England; Wales

The FA Cup 1975–76 is the 95th season of the world's oldest football knockout competition; The Football Association Challenge Cup, or FA Cup for short. The large number of clubs entering the tournament from lower down the English football league system meant that the competition started with a number of preliminary and qualifying rounds. The 28 victorious teams from the fourth round qualifying progressed to the first round proper.

== Preliminary round ==
=== Ties ===
Tie	Home team	Score	Away team
1	Alvechurch	1–1	Evesham United
2	Corby Town	0–0	Boston
3	Coventry Sporting	3–0	Bromsgrove Rovers
4	Crook Town	3–0	Barrow
5	Eastwood Hanley	1–3	Buxton
6	Enderby Town	2–1	Atherstone Town
7	Epsom & Ewell	4–2	Corinthian Casuals
8	Evenwood Town	2–3	Bridlington Trinity
9	Fareham Town	1–0	Bath City
10	Folkestone & Shepway	1–2	Canterbury City
11	Gravesend & Northfleet	1–1	Chertsey Town
12	Grays Athletic	1–2	Barnet
13	Great Harwood	2–1	Burscough
14	Guildford & Dorking United	7–0	Arundel
15	Harlow Town	2–3	Clacton Town
16	Harrow Borough	2–2	Barking
17	Hatfield Town	1–0	Edmonton & Haringey
18	Haywards Heath	0–4	Burgess Hill Town
19	Hednesford Town	1–1	Brereton Social
20	Hertford Town	0–2	Burnham
21	Hinckley Athletic	0–4	Dudley Town
22	Hoddesdon Town	1–2	Dunstable Town
23	Horden Colliery Welfare	1–1	Bridlington Town
24	Horwich R M I	1–1	Farsley Celtic
25	Kidderminster Harriers	0–1	Bedworth United
26	King's Lynn	2–0	Gorleston
27	Littlehampton Town	1–1	Chichester City
28	Llanelli	0–2	Mangotsfield United
29	Louth United	0–0	Barton Town
30	Lowestoft Town	4–3	Harwich & Parkeston
31	Maidstone United	5–0	Eastbourne United
32	Melksham Town	2–0	Devizes Town
33	Milton Keynes City	3–1	Didcot Town
34	Mossley	2–0	Emley
35	New Brighton	3–1	Bacup Borough
36	Penzance	5–1	Bideford
37	Porthmadog	3–2	Bethesda Athletic

=== Replays ===
Tie	Home team	Score	Away team
1	Evesham United	0–1	Alvechurch
2	Boston	1–2	Corby Town
11	Chertsey Town	0–2	Gravesend & Northfleet
16	Barking	2–0	Harrow Borough
19	Brereton Social	1–1	Hednesford Town
23	Bridlington Town	4–1	Horden Colliery Welfare
24	Farsley Celtic	1–1	Horwich R M I
27	Chichester City	0–2	Littlehampton Town
29	Barton Town	1–3	Louth United

=== 2nd replays ===
Tie	Home team	Score	Away team
19	Hednesford Town	3–3	Brereton Social
24	Horwich R M I	2–1	Farsley Celtic

=== 3rd replay ===
Tie	Home team	Score	Away team
19	Brereton Social	0–2	Hednesford Town

== 1st qualifying round ==
=== Ties ===
Tie	Home team	Score	Away team
1	Accrington Stanley	2–3	Hyde United
2	Addlestone	2–0	Metropolitan Police
3	Alfreton Town	2–0	Gresley Rovers
4	Alton Town	2–1	Horsham
5	Andover	1–1	Frome Town
6	Armitage	0–3	Leek Town
7	Arnold	2–1	Long Eaton United
8	Ashby Institute	0–1	Mexborough Town
9	Ashford Town (Kent)	2–1	Lewes
10	Ashington	0–2	Netherfield
11	Ashton United	1–2	Skelmersdale United
12	Aveley	1–1	Hornchurch
13	Aylesbury United	2–1	Redditch United
14	Banbury United	1–0	Lye Town
15	Bangor City	2–0	Pwllheli & District
16	Barnstaple Town	9–1	St Blazey
17	Barry Town	1–1	Everwarm
18	Basingstoke Town	2–1	Farnborough Town
19	Bedford Town	2–0	Ely City
20	Belper Town	1–0	Ilkeston Town
21	Bexhill Town	0–8	Margate
22	Bexley United	0–2	Hillingdon Borough
23	Biggleswade & District	0–1	Maidenhead United
24	Billingham Synthonia	1–1	Shildon
25	Bilston	3–1	Eastwood Town
26	Bishop Auckland	0–1	North Shields
27	Bognor Regis Town	1–3	Newport I O W
28	Boldon Colliery Welfare	2–0	Consett
29	Boreham Wood	2–0	Hounslow
30	Bourne Town	4–0	Chatteris Town
31	Bracknell Town	1–1	Feltham
32	Bridgwater Town	1–2	Minehead
33	Bridport	4–3	Dorchester Town
34	Brierley Hill Alliance	2–1	Gloucester City
35	Brigg Town	2–1	Goole Town
36	Bromley	3–1	Leytonstone
37	Burton Albion	1–3	Darlaston
38	Bury Town	1–1	St Neots Town
39	Cambridge City	5–1	March Town United
40	Carshalton Athletic	0–2	Kingstonian
41	Cheltenham Town	1–1	Desborough Town
42	Chesham United	3–0	Epping Town
43	Cheshunt	2–2	Hemel Hempstead
44	Chippenham Town	2–4	Cinderford Town
45	Chorley	1–0	Nantwich Town
46	Clapton	2–0	Finchley
47	Clitheroe	1–2	Lancaster City
48	Congleton Town	4–3	Curzon Ashton
49	Cowes	0–2	Gosport Borough
50	Crawley Town	2–1	Hastings United
51	Cray Wanderers	1–3	Dulwich Hamlet
52	Croydon	1–1	Erith & Belvedere
53	Dagenham	5–1	Edgware Town
54	Darwen	2–3	Droylsden
55	Deal Town	1–1	Eastbourne Town
56	Denaby United	4–1	Stocksbridge Works
57	Dover	4–1	Peacehaven & Telscombe
58	Durham City	1–3	Easington Colliery Welfare
59	Egham Town	2–0	Hampton
60	Enfield	3–0	Hayes
61	Eppleton Colliery Welfare	1–0	Ferryhill Athletic
62	Falmouth Town	5–1	Newquay
63	Faversham Town	2–1	Herne Bay
64	Fleetwood	2–0	Glossop
65	Formby	0–1	Marine
66	Frickley Colliery	3–0	Gainsborough Trinity
67	Glastonbury	2–1	Hungerford Town
68	Gornal Athletic	1–0	Highgate United
69	Great Yarmouth Town	1–0	Holbeach United
70	Halesowen Town	2–1	Warley County Borough
71	Heanor Town	2–6	Tividale
72	Histon	0–2	Letchworth Town
73	Irthlingborough Diamonds	1–2	A P Leamington
74	Leyland Motors	1–8	Rossendale United
75	Leyton Wingate	1–1	Tilbury
76	Macclesfield Town	0–0	Sutton Town
77	Mangotsfield United	0–1	Merthyr Tydfil
78	Marlow	2–0	Wokingham Town
79	Medway	1–3	Tunbridge Wells
80	Molesey	4–1	Willesden
81	Moor Green	0–1	Enderby Town
82	New Mills	1–1	Oswestry Town
83	Northwich Victoria	2–0	Buxton
84	Nuneaton Borough	2–1	Tamworth
85	Oldbury United	0–0	Coventry Sporting
86	Oxford City	2–0	Wolverton Town & B R
87	Pagham	1–1	Southwick
88	Parson Drove United	5–5	Thetford Town
89	Penrith	1–0	Whitley Bay
90	Poole Town	1–0	Worthing
91	Potton United	2–1	Sudbury Town
92	Prescot Town	1–1	Stalybridge Celtic
93	Prestwich Heys	0–1	Great Harwood
94	Radcliffe Borough	4–0	Horwich R M I
95	Ramsgate	4–1	Sittingbourne
96	Redhill	1–0	Burgess Hill Town
97	Retford Town	0–0	Skegness Town
98	Rhyl	4–2	St Helens Town
99	Ringmer	1–1	Maidstone United
100	Romford	3–1	Ware
101	Rothwell Town	1–0	Bedworth United
102	Ruislip Manor	0–2	Clacton Town
103	Runcorn	5–3	Porthmadog
104	Rushden Town	0–3	Witney Town
105	Ryde Sports	0–4	Guildford & Dorking United
106	Salisbury	3–1	Trowbridge Town
107	Selby Town	1–0	Louth United
108	Sheppey United	5–1	Whitstable Town
109	Sidley United	0–2	Canterbury City
110	Soham Town Rangers	1–0	Wisbech Town
111	South Bank	2–0	West Auckland Town
112	South Liverpool	0–3	Witton Albion
113	Southall & Ealing Borough	1–1	Epsom & Ewell
114	Spalding United	3–3	King's Lynn
115	Spennymoor United	1–1	Crook Town
116	St Albans City	3–3	Tooting & Mitcham United
117	Staines Town	2–0	Tring Town
118	Stamford	3–2	Corby Town
119	Stevenage Athletic	2–1	Barking
120	Stonehouse	0–6	Yeovil Town
121	Stourbridge	0–1	Dudley Town
122	Stowmarket	0–1	Lowestoft Town
123	Sutton Coldfield Town	1–0	Hednesford Town
124	Sutton United	1–1	Barnet
125	Swaythling	2–0	Fareham Town
126	Taunton Town	2–3	Wadebridge Town
127	Tiverton Town	1–3	Penzance
128	Ton Pentre	4–3	Worcester City
129	Tonbridge	5–0	Hatfield Town
130	Tow Law Town	1–0	Bridlington Trinity
131	Uxbridge	1–3	Wembley
132	Vauxhall Motors	0–1	Dunstable Town
133	Walthamstow Avenue	2–1	Gravesend & Northfleet
134	Waterlooville	2–2	Littlehampton Town
135	Wealdstone	1–1	Woking
136	Wellingborough Town	0–1	Milton Keynes City
137	Welton Rovers	1–3	Alvechurch
138	Weston Super Mare	3–0	Melksham Town
139	Whitby Town	4–0	Wingate (Durham)
140	Willington	4–2	Bridlington Town
141	Windsor & Eton	1–1	Burnham
142	Winsford United	4–1	New Brighton
143	Winterton Rangers	4–2	Yorkshire Amateur
144	Worksop Town	1–0	Mossley

=== Replays ===
Tie	Home team	Score	Away team
5	Frome Town	5–3	Andover
12	Hornchurch	3–1	Aveley
17	Everwarm	0–1	Barry Town
24	Shildon	3–2	Billingham Synthonia
31	Feltham	3–2	Bracknell Town
38	St Neots Town	2–0	Bury Town
41	Desborough Town	2–3	Cheltenham Town
43	Hemel Hempstead	0–2	Cheshunt
52	Erith & Belvedere	1–3	Croydon
55	Eastbourne Town	1–0	Deal Town
75	Tilbury	11–0	Leyton Wingate
76	Sutton Town	0–4	Macclesfield Town
82	Oswestry Town	5–3	New Mills
85	Coventry Sporting	3–1	Oldbury United
87	Southwick	3–1	Pagham
88	Thetford Town	5–0	Parson Drove United
92	Stalybridge Celtic	1–2	Prescot Town
97	Skegness Town	0–2	Retford Town
99	Maidstone United	3–1	Ringmer
113	Epsom & Ewell	3–3	Southall & Ealing Borough
114	King's Lynn	1–1	Spalding United
115	Crook Town	1–2	Spennymoor United
116	Tooting & Mitcham United	4–0	St Albans City
124	Barnet	1–2	Sutton United
134	Littlehampton Town	1–3	Waterlooville
135	Woking	3–5	Wealdstone
141	Burnham	1–0	Windsor & Eton

=== 2nd replays ===
Tie	Home team	Score	Away team
113	Southall & Ealing Borough	5–1	Epsom & Ewell
114	Spalding United	5–2	King's Lynn

== 2nd qualifying round ==
=== Ties ===
Tie	Home team	Score	Away team
1	A P Leamington	3–1	Aylesbury United
2	Alvechurch	1–0	Ton Pentre
3	Barry Town	5–2	Merthyr Tydfil
4	Basingstoke Town	5–0	Alton Town
5	Bilston	2–2	Alfreton Town
6	Boldon Colliery Welfare	1–1	Netherfield
7	Bourne Town	1–5	Bedford Town
8	Bridport	0–3	Frome Town
9	Brigg Town	2–3	Mexborough Town
10	Burnham	0–2	Wealdstone
11	Canterbury City	6–2	Sheppey United
12	Cheltenham Town	2–0	Banbury United
13	Chesham United	2–0	Hornchurch
14	Chorley	3–1	Skelmersdale United
15	Cinderford Town	0–1	Brierley Hill Alliance
16	Clacton Town	1–1	Romford
17	Clapton	1–2	Cheshunt
18	Congleton Town	1–3	Leek Town
19	Coventry Sporting	2–0	Halesowen Town
20	Crawley Town	4–1	Ashford Town (Kent)
21	Croydon	2–1	Bromley
22	Dagenham	4–0	Boreham Wood
23	Darlaston	0–1	Arnold
24	Droylsden	3–2	Hyde United
25	Dudley Town	0–1	Nuneaton Borough
26	Dulwich Hamlet	5–1	Hillingdon Borough
27	Dunstable Town	0–2	Wembley
28	Easington Colliery Welfare	1–3	Shildon
29	Eastbourne Town	0–2	Margate
30	Egham Town	0–1	Kingstonian
31	Enderby Town	0–1	Tividale
32	Enfield	6–0	Maidenhead United
33	Eppleton Colliery Welfare	1–1	North Shields
34	Falmouth Town	4–0	Barnstaple Town
35	Faversham Town	0–4	Dover
36	Feltham	2–6	Addlestone
37	Fleetwood	1–1	Lancaster City
38	Frickley Colliery	2–2	Denaby United
39	Glastonbury	0–4	Minehead
40	Gornal Athletic	2–0	Belper Town
41	Gosport Borough	2–2	Newport I O W
42	Great Harwood	5–1	Prescot Town
43	Great Yarmouth Town	3–2	St Neots Town
44	Guildford & Dorking United	2–2	Southwick
45	Letchworth Town	0–1	Cambridge City
46	Lowestoft Town	3–3	Potton United
47	Maidstone United	1–2	Ramsgate
48	Marine	1–0	Bangor City
49	Milton Keynes City	2–1	Witney Town
50	Northwich Victoria	3–1	Oswestry Town
51	Penzance	2–1	Wadebridge Town
52	Radcliffe Borough	2–2	Rossendale United
53	Redhill	4–1	Tunbridge Wells
54	Rothwell Town	0–1	Oxford City
55	Runcorn	4–1	Rhyl
56	Selby Town	0–2	Retford Town
57	Southall & Ealing Borough	2–1	Tilbury
58	Spalding United	8–2	Soham Town Rangers
59	Spennymoor United	2–0	Penrith
60	Stamford	2–0	Thetford Town
61	Stevenage Athletic	2–2	Tooting & Mitcham United
62	Sutton Coldfield Town	0–2	Macclesfield Town
63	Sutton United	5–1	Staines Town
64	Swaythling	0–1	Salisbury
65	Tonbridge	2–2	Marlow
66	Tow Law Town	2–1	South Bank
67	Walthamstow Avenue	1–2	Molesey
68	Waterlooville	3–0	Poole Town
69	Weston Super Mare	0–0	Yeovil Town
70	Willington	2–0	Whitby Town
71	Winsford United	3–2	Witton Albion
72	Worksop Town	4–3	Winterton Rangers

=== Replays ===
Tie	Home team	Score	Away team
5	Alfreton Town	2–1	Bilston
6	Netherfield	3–2	Boldon Colliery Welfare
16	Romford	3–2	Clacton Town
33	North Shields	0–1	Eppleton Colliery Welfare
37	Lancaster City	2–1	Fleetwood
38	Denaby United	0–2	Frickley Colliery
41	Newport I O W	1–1	Gosport Borough
44	Southwick	3–2	Guildford & Dorking United
46	Potton United	1–3	Lowestoft Town
52	Rossendale United	4–1	Radcliffe Borough
61	Tooting & Mitcham United	2–0	Stevenage Athletic
65	Marlow	1–3	Tonbridge
69	Yeovil Town	4–0	Weston Super Mare

=== 2nd replay ===
Tie	Home team	Score	Away team
41	Gosport Borough	2–0	Newport I O W

== 3rd qualifying round ==
=== Ties ===
Tie	Home team	Score	Away team
1	Alvechurch	3–1	Barry Town
2	Canterbury City	2–0	Margate
3	Coventry Sporting	2–1	Brierley Hill Alliance
4	Great Harwood	1–1	Droylsden
5	Lowestoft Town	1–0	Cambridge City
6	Macclesfield Town	3–1	Arnold
7	Milton Keynes City	0–1	A P Leamington
8	Molesey	0–4	Croydon
9	Northwich Victoria	1–1	Leek Town
10	Nuneaton Borough	1–1	Gornal Athletic
11	Oxford City	0–0	Cheltenham Town
12	Penzance	0–3	Falmouth Town
13	Ramsgate	0–2	Dover
14	Redhill	1–1	Crawley Town
15	Retford Town	1–2	Mexborough Town
16	Romford	1–0	Cheshunt
17	Rossendale United	2–1	Lancaster City
18	Runcorn	0–0	Marine
19	Salisbury	1–0	Frome Town
20	Southall & Ealing Borough	2–2	Dulwich Hamlet
21	Southwick	2–1	Basingstoke Town
22	Spalding United	2–0	Great Yarmouth Town
23	Spennymoor United	3–0	Netherfield
24	Stamford	0–2	Bedford Town
25	Sutton United	3–1	Chesham United
26	Tividale	0–0	Alfreton Town
27	Tonbridge	0–0	Kingstonian
28	Tooting & Mitcham United	4–2	Addlestone
29	Tow Law Town	4–1	Shildon
30	Waterlooville	4–0	Gosport Borough
31	Wealdstone	2–0	Dagenham
32	Wembley	1–0	Enfield
33	Willington	2–1	Eppleton Colliery Welfare
34	Winsford United	2–0	Chorley
35	Worksop Town	1–1	Frickley Colliery
36	Yeovil Town	1–0	Minehead

=== Replays ===
Tie	Home team	Score	Away team
4	Droylsden	1–1	Great Harwood
9	Leek Town	1–0	Northwich Victoria
10	Gornal Athletic	0–3	Nuneaton Borough
11	Cheltenham Town	2–0	Oxford City
14	Crawley Town	1–0	Redhill
18	Marine	1–0	Runcorn
20	Dulwich Hamlet	1–2	Southall & Ealing Borough
26	Alfreton Town	0–1	Tividale
27	Kingstonian	3–1	Tonbridge
35	Frickley Colliery	1–1	Worksop Town

=== 2nd replays ===
Tie	Home team	Score	Away team
4	Great Harwood	0–1	Droylsden
35	Worksop Town	2–0	Frickley Colliery

== 4th qualifying round ==
The teams that given byes to this round are Morecambe, Dartford, Bishop's Stortford, Ilford, Walton & Hersham, Slough Town, Hendon, Telford United, Gateshead United, Chelmsford City, Grantham, Boston United, Blyth Spartans, Kettering Town, Wimbledon, Weymouth, Stafford Rangers, Wycombe Wanderers, Leatherhead and Hitchin Town.

=== Ties ===
Tie	Home team	Score	Away team
1	A P Leamington	3–2	Tividale
2	Bedford Town	6–1	Lowestoft Town
3	Blyth Spartans	0–0	Rossendale United
4	Chelmsford City	0–2	Bishop's Stortford
5	Coventry Sporting	2–0	Spalding United
6	Crawley Town	0–0	Dover
7	Croydon	2–2	Wycombe Wanderers
8	Droylsden	0–4	Gateshead United
9	Falmouth Town	1–5	Yeovil Town
10	Grantham	4–0	Leek Town
11	Hendon	1–0	Canterbury City
12	Hitchin Town	0–1	Romford
13	Kettering Town	3–4	Boston United
14	Leatherhead	1–0	Ilford
15	Mexborough Town	1–2	Macclesfield Town
16	Nuneaton Borough	2–1	Cheltenham Town
17	Salisbury	4–5	Weymouth
18	Slough Town	1–2	Walton & Hersham
19	Southall & Ealing Borough	1–4	Tooting & Mitcham United
20	Stafford Rangers	1–1	Alvechurch
21	Sutton United	1–1	Waterlooville
22	Telford United	1–1	Winsford United
23	Tow Law Town	0–2	Spennymoor United
24	Wealdstone	3–1	Southwick
25	Wembley	0–1	Dartford
26	Willington	2–2	Morecambe
27	Wimbledon	6–1	Kingstonian
28	Worksop Town	0–0	Marine

=== Replays ===
Tie	Home team	Score	Away team
3	Rossendale United	1–0	Blyth Spartans
6	Dover	6–0	Crawley Town
7	Wycombe Wanderers	5–2	Croydon
20	Alvechurch	1–2	Stafford Rangers
21	Waterlooville	1–3	Sutton United
22	Winsford United	5–4	Telford United
26	Morecambe	4–1	Willington
28	Marine	4–0	Worksop Town

== 1975–76 FA Cup ==
See 1975-76 FA Cup for details of the rounds from the first round proper onwards.
