= 1962–63 West Midlands (Regional) League =

West Midlands (Regional) League
- Season: 1962–63
- Champions: Tamworth
- Matches: 380
- Goals: 1,500 (3.95 per match)

The 1962–63 West Midlands (Regional) League season was the 63rd in the history of the West Midlands (Regional) League, an English association football competition for semi-professional and amateur teams based in the West Midlands county, Shropshire, Herefordshire, Worcestershire and southern Staffordshire.

Also, it was the first season under this name after the Birmingham and District League was renamed to reflect its actual catchment area.

== Clubs ==
The league featured 20 clubs from the Birmingham & District League previous season, no new clubs joined the league this season.

=== League table ===
Pos	Team	Pld	W	D	L	GF	GA	GR	Pts	Promotion or relegation
1	Lockheed Leamington	38	28	7	3	119	40	2.975	63	Transferred to the Midland League
2	Stourbridge	38	26	6	6	98	38	2.579	58	
3	Hednesford	38	22	7	9	97	62	1.565	51	
4	Halesowen Town	38	23	3	12	97	53	1.830	49	
5	Atherstone Town	38	23	3	12	95	57	1.667	49	
6	Kidderminster Harriers	38	20	8	10	88	53	1.660	48	
7	Bromsgrove Rovers	38	21	5	12	95	52	1.827	47	
8	Brierley Hill Alliance	38	17	10	11	70	62	1.129	44	
9	Dudley Town	38	19	6	13	72	71	1.014	44	
10	Stratford Town	38	15	12	11	52	48	1.083	42	
11	Tamworth	38	15	8	15	69	69	1.000	38	
12	Darlaston	38	15	4	19	80	71	1.127	34	
13	Banbury Spencer	38	15	4	19	86	86	1.000	34	
14	Bilston	38	14	6	18	78	95	0.821	34	
15	Moor Green	38	11	9	18	59	95	0.621	31	
16	Lye Town	38	11	5	22	56	99	0.566	27	
17	Bedworth United	38	9	4	25	61	88	0.693	22	
18	Redditch	38	6	9	23	44	95	0.463	21	
19	Boldmere St. Michaels	38	4	5	29	39	133	0.293	13	Transferred to the Worcestershire Combination
20	Sutton Town	38	4	3	31	45	133	0.338	11	

Source: nonleaguematters
Rules for classification: 1) points; 2) goal ratio.
