= 1961–62 FA Cup qualifying rounds =

Tournament details
- Country: England; Wales

The FA Cup 1961–62 is the 81st season of the world's oldest football knockout competition; The Football Association Challenge Cup, or FA Cup for short. The large number of clubs entering the tournament from lower down the English football league system meant that the competition started with a number of preliminary and qualifying rounds. The 30 victorious teams from the fourth round qualifying progressed to the first round proper.

== Preliminary round ==
=== Ties ===
Tie	Home team	Score	Away team
1	Altrincham	6–1	Earlestown
2	Ashington	3–2	Spennymoor United
3	Bacup Borough	1–5	Darwen
4	Bromsgrove Rovers	2–0	Moor Green
5	Ellesmere Port Town	5–3	Llandudno
6	Mossley	1–2	Congleton Town
7	South Bank	4–2	Annfield Plain

== 1st qualifying round ==
=== Ties ===
Tie	Home team	Score	Away team
1	Abingdon Town	2–0	Huntley & Palmers
2	Altrincham	3–3	Marine
3	Andover	5–1	Alton Town
4	Arnold St Mary's	1–5	Matlock Town
5	Ashington	4–1	Silksworth Colliery Welfare
6	Atherstone Town	3–2	Long Eaton United
7	Aveley	2–2	Ilford
8	Basingstoke Town	3–0	Chichester City
9	Bedford Town	8–0	Letchworth Town
10	Bedlington Mechanics	4–2	Whitby Town
11	Bedworth Town	3–0	Halesowen Town
12	Bideford	5–3	Truro City
13	Boston United	3–4	Louth United
14	Bourne Town	2–1	Rushden Town
15	Bridport	3–1	Swanage Town
16	Bromley	4–0	Metropolitan Police
17	Bromsgrove Rovers	4–0	Redditch
18	Bungay Town	0–6	Clacton Town
19	Burscough	2–0	Lancaster City
20	Chatteris Town	1–5	Cambridge United
21	Chesham United	1–4	Banbury Spencer
22	Chippenham United	2–6	Cheltenham Town
23	Congleton Town	4–2	Lostock Gralam
24	Cowes	3–1	Newbury Town
25	Crawley Town	5–0	Worthing
26	Creswell Colliery	1–2	Worksop Town
27	Dartford	5–0	Sittingbourne
28	Darwen	3–1	Lytham
29	Dover	4–0	Deal Town
30	East End Park W M C	1–1	Yorkshire Amateur
31	Eastbourne United	5–2	Bexhill Town
32	Edgware Town	2–1	Southall
33	Ellesmere Port Town	2–0	Pwllheli & District
34	Enfield	8–1	Hertford Town
35	Epsom & Ewell	1–2	Dulwich Hamlet
36	Evenwood Town	3–3	Murton Colliery Welfare
37	Evesham United	1–5	Brierley Hill Alliance
38	Fareham Town	2–3	Newport I O W
39	Ferryhill Athletic	0–1	Horden Colliery Welfare
40	Fleetwood	9–1	Milnthorpe Corinthians
41	Gainsborough Trinity	6–0	Norton Woodseats
42	Gloucester City	5–1	Stonehouse
43	Goole Town	5–1	Farsley Celtic
44	Gravesend & Northfleet	2–2	Bexleyheath & Welling
45	Grays Athletic	3–2	Brentwood & Warley
46	Great Yarmouth Town	1–0	Gorleston
47	Harrow Town	7–1	Bishop's Stortford
48	Heanor Town	4–2	Belper Town
49	Hednesford Town	3–6	Bilston
50	Hendon	9–1	Leyton
51	Histon	2–3	Bury Town
52	Hitchin Town	2–1	Biggleswade & District
53	Holbeach United	0–2	Grantham
54	Hornchurch	2–6	Dagenham
55	Horwich R M I	0–2	Ashton United
56	Hounslow Town	2–4	Barnet
57	Hyde United	3–0	Chorley
58	Ilkeston Town	1–1	Hinckley Athletic
59	Lancing Athletic	1–4	Haywards Heath
60	Leatherhead	2–2	Kingstonian
61	Leytonstone	1–1	Clapton
62	Linotype & Machinery	1–1	Buxton
63	Littlehampton Town	5–3	Horsham
64	Lockheed Leamington	1–2	Rugby Town
65	Loughborough United	2–6	Burton Albion
66	Lovells Athletic	2–3	Barry Town
67	Macclesfield	4–0	Droylsden
68	Maidenhead United	8–2	Hayes
69	March Town United	0–2	Newmarket Town
70	Melksham Town	6–0	Calne & Harris United
71	Merthyr Tydfil	5–0	Llanelli
72	Morecambe	4–2	Clitheroe
73	Nelson	4–0	Leyland Motors
74	Netherfield	2–3	Penrith
75	New Brighton	7–0	Flint Town United
76	North Shields	3–0	Easington Colliery Welfare
77	Northwich Victoria	2–1	Witton Albion
78	Nuneaton Borough	3–0	Tamworth
79	Oswestry Town	1–1	Kidderminster Harriers
80	Oxford City	5–2	Aylesbury United
81	Prescot Cables	3–1	St Helens Town
82	Rainham Town	0–1	Barking
83	Ransome & Marles	1–4	Alford United
84	Redhill	1–0	Carshalton Athletic
85	Retford Town	5–0	Denaby United
86	Romford	6–2	Wembley
87	Rossendale United	1–2	Stalybridge Celtic
88	Rothwell Town	6–2	Eynesbury Rovers
89	Runcorn	2–0	Bangor City
90	Ryhope Colliery Welfare	1–2	Billingham Synthonia
91	Selby Town	4–1	Frickley Colliery
92	Sheppey United	2–2	Erith & Belvedere
93	Sheringham	3–5	Lowestoft Town
94	Shildon	3–3	Tow Law Town
95	Shirebrook Miners Welfare	1–8	Alfreton Town
96	Skegness Town	1–1	Spalding United
97	Skelmersdale United	0–4	Wigan Athletic
98	Slough Town	4–1	Sutton United
99	South Bank	0–3	Newburn
100	South Liverpool	4–0	Stork
101	South Normanton Miners Welfare	2–6	Sutton Town
102	St Albans City	1–2	Cambridge City
103	St Neots Town	0–2	Corby Town
104	Stafford Rangers	2–2	Sankey Of Wellington
105	Stamford	5–0	Wellingborough Town
106	Stanley United	5–1	Durham City
107	Stockton	2–3	Bridlington Town
108	Stourbridge	1–0	Wellington Town
109	Stowmarket	2–2	Harwich & Parkeston
110	Street	0–2	Frome Town
111	Sudbury Town	5–3	Ely City
112	Tilbury	6–0	Woodford Town
113	Tooting & Mitcham United	7–1	Marlow
114	Trowbridge Town	2–2	Devizes Town
115	Tunbridge Wells United	1–0	Maidstone United
116	Uxbridge	1–2	Finchley
117	Vauxhall Motors	2–2	Wolverton Town & B R
118	Walton & Hersham	2–2	Dorking
119	Warminster Town	1–6	Dorchester Town
120	Wealdstone	5–0	Ware
121	Weston Super Mare	5–3	Westbury United
122	Whitley Bay	5–2	Boldon Colliery Welfare
123	Whitstable	0–4	Canterbury City
124	Willington	2–2	Shotton Colliery Welfare
125	Wimbledon	5–1	Woking
126	Windsor & Eton	0–2	Yiewsley
127	Witney Town	0–4	Wokingham Town

=== Replays ===
Tie	Home team	Score	Away team
2	Marine	2–2	Altrincham
7	Ilford	3–0	Aveley
30	Yorkshire Amateur	0–2	East End Park W M C
36	Murton Colliery Welfare	2–3	Evenwood Town
44	Bexleyheath & Welling	4–1	Gravesend & Northfleet
58	Hinckley Athletic	2–1	Ilkeston Town
60	Kingstonian	4–2	Leatherhead
61	Clapton	1–2	Leytonstone
62	Buxton	6–1	Linotype & Machinery
79	Kidderminster Harriers	1–1	Oswestry Town
92	Erith & Belvedere	2–1	Sheppey United
94	Tow Law Town	1–5	Shildon
96	Spalding United	0–3	Skegness Town
104	Sankey Of Wellington	5–1	Stafford Rangers
109	Harwich & Parkeston	7–2	Stowmarket
114	Devizes Town	0–2	Trowbridge Town
117	Wolverton Town & B R	0–3	Vauxhall Motors
118	Dorking	1–3	Walton & Hersham
124	Shotton Colliery Welfare	2–3	Willington

=== 2nd replay ===
Tie	Home team	Score	Away team
2	Marine	0–1	Altrincham
79	Kidderminster Harriers	4–0	Oswestry Town

== 2nd qualifying round ==
=== Ties ===
Tie	Home team	Score	Away team
1	Andover	7–1	Basingstoke Town
2	Ashton United	3–3	Altrincham
3	Banbury Spencer	4–1	Abingdon Town
4	Bedlington Mechanics	1–0	Billingham Synthonia
5	Bognor Regis Town	1–1	Littlehampton Town
6	Bridlington Town	1–2	North Shields
7	Brierley Hill Alliance	2–0	Bedworth Town
8	Buxton	2–3	Congleton Town
9	Cambridge City	7–0	Vauxhall Motors
10	Cambridge United	5–1	Sudbury Town
11	Cheltenham Town	5–2	Melksham Town
12	Chippenham Town	1–1	Trowbridge Town
13	Clacton Town	3–4	Harwich & Parkeston
14	Crawley Town	3–2	Haywards Heath
15	Cray Wanderers	3–4	Erith & Belvedere
16	Dagenham	3–1	Hendon
17	Dartford	4–0	Bexleyheath & Welling
18	Dulwich Hamlet	3–1	Tooting & Mitcham United
19	East End Park W M C	1–1	Goole Town
20	Ebbw Vale	1–2	Merthyr Tydfil
21	Fleetwood	1–1	Burscough
22	Folkestone	2–3	Dover
23	Glastonbury	1–1	Weston Super Mare
24	Gloucester City	0–0	Barry Town
25	Grantham	2–1	Louth United
26	Grays Athletic	3–1	Ilford
27	Great Yarmouth Town	2–0	Lowestoft Town
28	Harrogate Town	1–2	Selby Town
29	Harrow Town	0–4	Enfield
30	Heanor Town	4–2	Matlock Town
31	Hinckley Athletic	3–1	Atherstone Town
32	Hitchin Town	3–2	Bedford Town
33	Hyde United	5–1	Darwen
34	Kidderminster Harriers	0–2	Bromsgrove Rovers
35	Kingstonian	2–1	Bromley
36	Maidenhead United	1–0	Edgware Town
37	Minehead	3–0	Frome Town
38	New Brighton	1–2	Ellesmere Port Town
39	Newhaven	1–6	Eastbourne United
40	Newmarket Town	2–6	Bury Town
41	Newport I O W	0–0	Cowes
42	Northwich Victoria	1–0	Macclesfield
43	Nuneaton Borough	1–0	Burton Albion
44	Penrith	1–2	Morecambe
45	Penzance	2–3	Barnstaple Town
46	Poole Town	0–1	Dorchester Town
47	Portland United	4–3	Bridport
48	Ramsgate Athletic	2–1	Canterbury City
49	Romford	3–1	Leytonstone
50	Rothwell Town	1–2	Bourne Town
51	Rugby Town	1–0	Bilston
52	Sankey Of Wellington	2–0	Stourbridge
53	Shildon	4–2	Evenwood Town
54	Skegness Town	6–1	Alford United
55	Slough Town	2–0	Redhill
56	South Liverpool	0–0	Runcorn
57	Stalybridge Celtic	1–0	Nelson
58	Stamford	1–1	Corby Town
59	Stanley United	1–4	Ashington
60	Stocksbridge Works	0–0	Retford Town
61	Sutton Town	5–0	Alfreton Town
62	Tilbury	2–1	Barking
63	Tonbridge	1–3	Tunbridge Wells United
64	Wadebridge Town	1–4	Bideford
65	Wealdstone	1–1	Barnet
66	Whitley Bay	0–4	Horden Colliery Welfare
67	Wigan Athletic	1–1	Prescot Cables
68	Willington	3–2	Newburn
69	Wimbledon	1–2	Walton & Hersham
70	Wokingham Town	0–3	Oxford City
71	Worksop Town	4–3	Gainsborough Trinity
72	Yiewsley	2–0	Finchley

=== Replays ===
Tie	Home team	Score	Away team
2	Altrincham	3–1	Ashton United
5	Littlehampton Town	0–2	Bognor Regis Town
12	Trowbridge Town	0–2	Chippenham Town
19	Goole Town	2–1	East End Park W M C
21	Burscough	5–2	Fleetwood
23	Weston Super Mare	2–2	Glastonbury
24	Barry Town	2–1	Gloucester City
41	Cowes	5–1	Newport I O W
56	Runcorn	2–0	South Liverpool
58	Corby Town	3–1	Stamford
60	Retford Town	2–5	Stocksbridge Works
65	Barnet	9–0	Wealdstone
67	Prescot Cables	1–3	Wigan Athletic

=== 2nd replay ===
Tie	Home team	Score	Away team
23	Glastonbury	0–3	Weston Super Mare

== 3rd qualifying round ==
=== Ties ===
Tie	Home team	Score	Away team
1	Altrincham	1–1	Wigan Athletic
2	Andover	2–1	Cowes
3	Ashington	2–2	Bedlington Mechanics
4	Banbury Spencer	3–1	Oxford City
5	Barnstaple Town	1–2	Bideford
6	Barry Town	2–0	Merthyr Tydfil
7	Bourne Town	1–5	Corby Town
8	Brierley Hill Alliance	2–1	Rugby Town
9	Bromsgrove Rovers	1–2	Sankey Of Wellington
10	Burscough	1–8	Morecambe
11	Cambridge United	3–2	Bury Town
12	Cheltenham Town	2–0	Chippenham Town
13	Congleton Town	1–2	Northwich Victoria
14	Crawley Town	2–1	Bognor Regis Town
15	Dagenham	1–1	Romford
16	Dartford	3–1	Erith & Belvedere
17	Dover	3–2	Ramsgate Athletic
18	Dulwich Hamlet	5–1	Slough Town
19	Eastbourne United	1–5	Tunbridge Wells United
20	Ellesmere Port Town	4–3	Runcorn
21	Enfield	2–4	Barnet
22	Goole Town	2–2	Selby Town
23	Grantham	3–1	Skegness Town
24	Grays Athletic	1–1	Tilbury
25	Harwich & Parkeston	5–1	Great Yarmouth Town
26	Heanor Town	5–1	Sutton Town
27	Hinckley Athletic	2–2	Nuneaton Borough
28	Hitchin Town	2–1	Cambridge City
29	Hyde United	2–2	Stalybridge Celtic
30	Kingstonian	4–1	Walton & Hersham
31	Maidenhead United	2–3	Yiewsley
32	Portland United	0–3	Dorchester Town
33	Shildon	1–0	Horden Colliery Welfare
34	Weston Super Mare	1–0	Minehead
35	Willington	2–4	North Shields
36	Worksop Town	3–1	Stocksbridge Works

=== Replays ===
Tie	Home team	Score	Away team
1	Wigan Athletic	3–1	Altrincham
3	Bedlington Mechanics	1–4	Ashington
15	Romford	4–1	Dagenham
22	Selby Town	1–0	Goole Town
24	Tilbury	2–1	Grays Athletic
28	Nuneaton Borough	1–1	Hinckley Athletic
30	Stalybridge Celtic	0–0	Hyde United (Abandoned in extra time)

=== 2nd replays ===
Tie	Home team	Score	Away team
28	Hinckley Athletic	3–1	Nuneaton Borough
30	Hyde United	1–2	Stalybridge Celtic

== 4th qualifying round ==
The teams that given byes to this round are Gateshead, Crook Town, Bishop Auckland, Wycombe Wanderers, Yeovil Town, Hereford United, South Shields, Worcester City, Oxford United, King's Lynn, Guildford City, Chelmsford City, Rhyl, Blyth Spartans, Margate, Bath City, Wisbech Town, Salisbury, Ashford Town (Kent), Kettering Town, Scarborough, Weymouth, Bridgwater Town and Hastings United

=== Ties ===
Tie	Home team	Score	Away team
1	Ashford Town (Kent)	3–1	Dover
2	Banbury Spencer	4–0	Yiewsley
3	Barnet	3–2	Hitchin Town
4	Barry Town	2–1	Bideford
5	Bath City	0–2	Bridgwater Town
6	Cheltenham Town	0–1	Weston Super Mare
7	Corby Town	2–2	Worksop Town
8	Crawley Town	1–2	Tunbridge Wells United
9	Crook Town	1–2	Shildon
10	Dartford	4–1	Hastings United
11	Dorchester Town	3–3	Weymouth
12	Dulwich Hamlet	1–2	King's Lynn
13	Gateshead	1–1	Selby Town
14	Grantham	2–1	Hinckley Athletic
15	Harwich & Parkeston	6–0	Kingstonian
16	Kettering Town	2–0	Heanor Town
17	Margate	6–2	Guildford City
18	Morecambe	2–0	Wigan Athletic
19	North Shields	1–2	Blyth Spartans
20	Northwich Victoria	1–0	Ellesmere Port Town
21	Oxford United	3–2	Salisbury
22	Rhyl	4–0	Stalybridge Celtic
23	Romford	2–1	Cambridge United
24	Sankey Of Wellington	0–1	Hereford United
25	Scarborough	2–2	Ashington
26	South Shields	2–1	Bishop Auckland
27	Wisbech Town	3–3	Chelmsford City
28	Worcester City	0–1	Brierley Hill Alliance
29	Wycombe Wanderers	3–1	Tilbury
30	Yeovil Town	4–0	Andover

=== Replays ===
Tie	Home team	Score	Away team
7	Worksop Town	2–1	Corby Town
11	Weymouth	2–0	Dorchester Town
13	Selby Town	0–3	Gateshead
25	Ashington	4–0	Scarborough
27	Chelmsford City	1–0	Wisbech Town

== 1961–62 FA Cup ==
See 1961-62 FA Cup for details of the rounds from the first round proper onwards.
