= 1970–71 West Midlands (Regional) League =

The 1970–71 West Midlands (Regional) League season was the 71st in the history of the West Midlands (Regional) League, an English association football competition for semi-professional and amateur teams based in the West Midlands county, Shropshire, Herefordshire, Worcestershire and southern Staffordshire.

== Premier Division ==
West Midlands League Premier Division
- Season: 1970–71
- Champions: Kidderminster Harriers
- Promoted: Stourbridge; Wellingborough Town
- Matches: 342
- Goals: 1,033 (3.02 per match)

The Premier Division featured 18 clubs which competed in the division last season, along with one new club:

- Wellingborough Town, joined from the Metropolitan League

=== League table ===
Pos	Team	Pld	W	D	L	GF	GA	GR	Pts	Promotion or relegation
1	Kidderminster Harriers	36	26	6	4	90	31	2.903	58	
2	Bilston	36	23	8	5	62	17	3.647	54	
3	Wellingborough Town	36	23	7	6	92	39	2.359	53	Promoted to the Southern Football League
4	Tamworth	36	23	6	7	80	41	1.951	52	
5	Bromsgrove Rovers	36	20	10	6	89	35	2.543	50	
6	Stourbridge	36	22	4	10	79	40	1.975	48	Promoted to the Southern Football League
7	Atherstone Town	36	18	10	8	68	34	2.000	46	
8	Bedworth United	36	15	11	10	57	47	1.213	41	
9	Eastwood Hanley	36	10	13	13	40	48	0.833	33	
10	Hednesford	36	12	7	17	51	47	1.085	31	
11	Halesowen Town	36	11	8	17	54	63	0.857	30	
12	Dudley Town	36	10	9	17	37	49	0.755	29	
13	Wolverhampton Wanderers "A"	36	9	8	19	39	66	0.591	26	
14	Lye Town	36	7	12	17	31	57	0.544	26	
15	Redditch	36	8	9	19	43	70	0.614	25	
16	Lower Gornal Athletic	36	9	7	20	33	72	0.458	25	
17	Darlaston	36	10	4	22	37	91	0.407	24	
18	Brierley Hill Alliance	36	5	12	19	29	56	0.518	22	
19	Hinckley Athletic	36	4	3	29	22	130	0.169	11	

Source: nonleaguematters
Rules for classification: 1) points; 2) goal ratio.
