= 1965–66 West Midlands (Regional) League =

The 1965–66 West Midlands (Regional) League season was the 66th in the history of the West Midlands (Regional) League, an English association football competition for semi-professional and amateur teams based in the West Midlands county, Shropshire, Herefordshire, Worcestershire and southern Staffordshire.

At the end of the previous season the second division was introduced. It was made up largely of reserve sides of non-league clubs, the majority of which were in the league's new ‘Premier Division’.

== Premier Division ==
West Midlands League Premier Division
- Season: 1965–66
- Champions: Tamworth
- Matches: 420
- Goals: 1,607 (3.83 per match)

The Premier Division featured 17 clubs which competed in the league last season, along with three new clubs:

- Cinderford Town, joined from the Warwickshire Combination
- Port Vale reserves
- Wolverhampton Wanderers "A"

Also, Banbury Spencer changed name to Banbury United.

=== League table ===
Pos	Team	Pld	W	D	L	GF	GA	GR	Pts	Promotion or relegation
1	Tamworth	40	29	7	4	123	51	2.412	65	
2	Walsall reserves	40	24	8	8	84	40	2.100	56	Resigned from the league
3	Banbury United	40	23	9	8	91	55	1.655	55	Joined the Southern Football League
4	Kidderminster Harriers	40	22	8	10	85	54	1.574	52	
5	Dudley Town	40	21	8	11	84	46	1.826	50	
6	Hednesford	40	22	3	15	87	61	1.426	47	
7	Bilston	40	19	9	12	71	60	1.183	47	
8	Halesowen Town	40	21	4	15	97	76	1.276	46	
9	Redditch	40	14	16	10	75	60	1.250	44	
10	Port Vale reserves	40	19	6	15	90	73	1.233	44	
11	Stourbridge	40	16	9	15	73	69	1.058	41	
12	Bromsgrove Rovers	40	16	8	16	73	76	0.961	40	
13	Lower Gornal Athletic	40	15	9	16	76	73	1.041	39	
14	Wolverhampton Wanderers "A"	40	13	10	17	77	73	1.055	36	
15	Atherstone Town	40	13	10	17	82	97	0.845	36	
16	Brierley Hill Alliance	40	13	10	17	75	91	0.824	36	
17	Stratford Town Amateurs	40	12	6	22	58	88	0.659	30	
18	Cinderford Town	40	10	5	25	54	81	0.667	25	
19	Darlaston	40	6	6	28	58	123	0.472	18	
20	Bedworth United	40	6	6	28	41	126	0.325	18	
21	Lye Town	40	6	3	31	53	134	0.396	15	

Source: nonleaguematters
Rules for classification: 1) points; 2) goal ratio.
