= 1963–64 FA Cup qualifying rounds =

Tournament details
- Country: England; Wales
- Teams: 283

Tournament statistics
- Matches played: 305
- Goals scored: 1,125 (3.69 per match)

The FA Cup 1963–64 is the 83rd season of the world's oldest football knockout competition; The Football Association Challenge Cup, or FA Cup for short. The large number of clubs entering the tournament from lower down the English football league system meant that the competition started with a number of preliminary and qualifying rounds. The 30 victorious teams from the fourth round qualifying progressed to the first round proper.

== 1st qualifying round ==
=== Ties ===
Tie	Home team	Score	Away team
1	Andover	2–0	Newport I O W
2	Annfield Plain	1–2	Stanley United
3	Ashington	1–1	Billingham Synthonia
4	Ashton United	5–2	St Helens Town
5	Aylesbury United	2–3	Maidenhead United
6	Banbury Spencer	4–0	Huntley & Palmers
7	Barking	3–1	Rainham Town
8	Barnet	4–2	Stevenage Town
9	Barnstaple Town	4–2	St Austell
10	Basingstoke Town	4–3	Fareham Town
11	Belper Town	5–3	Alfreton Town
12	Biggleswade & District	4–1	Wolverton Town & B R
13	Bilston	1–4	Rugby Town
14	Bishop Auckland	0–0	Horden Colliery Welfare
15	Bishop's Stortford	1–2	Harrow Town
16	Bognor Regis Town	0–4	Lewes
17	Borough United	7–2	Pwllheli & District
18	Bourne Town	6–1	Desborough Town
19	Brentwood & Warley	2–4	Aveley
20	Bridlington Town	3–3	Harrogate Town
21	Bromley	4–1	Chatham Town
22	Bromsgrove Rovers	1–3	Wellington Town
23	Burton Albion	0–1	Tamworth
24	Buxton	1–1	Sutton Town
25	Canterbury City	7–1	Whitstable
26	Carshalton Athletic	2–0	Redhill
27	Chatteris Town	4–0	March Town United
28	Cheltenham Town	7–2	Abergavenny Thursdays
29	Chorley	2–1	Stalybridge Celtic
30	Clitheroe	0–1	Netherfield
31	Corby Town	3–0	St Neots Town
32	Cowes	5–1	Alton Town
33	Cray Wanderers	1–0	Dartford
34	Dagenham	2–1	Leyton
35	Denaby United	0–5	Worksop Town
36	Devizes Town	0–5	Trowbridge Town
37	Dorchester Town	1–0	Poole Town
38	Dorking	2–3	Woking
39	Dover	1–2	Sheppey United
40	Dulwich Hamlet	0–3	Walthamstow Avenue
41	Earlestown	0–10	Altrincham (@ Altrincham)
42	Eastbourne	1–1	Tunbridge Wells United
43	Eastbourne United	0–1	Tonbridge
44	Edgware Town	1–2	Uxbridge
45	Ellesmere Port Town	0–1	Bangor City
46	Ely City	0–4	Bury Town
47	Epsom & Ewell	2–1	Slough Town
48	Farsley Celtic	0–0	Yorkshire Amateur
49	Finchley	4–0	Hounslow
50	Ford United	2–3	Clapton
51	Frickley Colliery	3–0	Ossett Albion
52	Frome Town	1–3	Minehead
53	Gainsborough Trinity	4–0	Stocksbridge Works
54	Glastonbury	2–5	Weston Super Mare
55	Gloucester City	2–2	Merthyr Tydfil
56	Grantham	3–0	Louth United
57	Grays Athletic	1–3	Tilbury
58	Gresley Rovers	1–3	Loughborough United
59	Guildford City	8–2	Petters Sports
60	Halesowen Town	1–0	Brierley Hill Alliance
61	Harlow Town	2–2	Ware
62	Harwich & Parkeston	5–2	Clacton Town
63	Hayes	2–1	Windsor & Eton
64	Haywards Heath	3–3	Crawley Town
65	Hednesford Town	3–4	Nuneaton Borough
66	Hendon	4–2	Leytonstone
67	Hitchin Town	4–2	Vauxhall Motors
68	Holbeach United	2–2	Boston United
69	Horsham	1–2	Littlehampton Town
70	Horwich R M I	0–3	Burscough
71	Hyde United	6–2	Rossendale United
72	Kidderminster Harriers	4–1	Stafford Rangers
73	Kingstonian	3–1	Walton & Hersham
74	Llandudno	0–4	Runcorn
75	Long Eaton United	2–2	Atherstone Town
76	Lostock Gralam	4–1	Witton Albion
77	Lovells Athletic	1–1	Barry Town
78	Lowestoft Town	5–0	Gorleston
79	Macclesfield	1–0	Winsford United
80	Maidstone United	1–0	Bexhill Town
81	Marine	2–2	Skelmersdale United
82	Matlock Town	4–1	Arnold St Mary's
83	Melksham Town	0–2	Chippenham Town
84	Milnthorpe Corinthians	0–5	Lancaster City
85	Nelson	5–1	Bacup Borough
86	Newbury Town	0–0	Hemel Hempstead
87	North Shields	3–2	Consett
88	Northwich Victoria	2–1	Droylsden
89	Oxford City	5–0	Chesham United
90	Penrith	1–3	Scarborough
91	Portland United	2–4	Bridport
92	Ramsgate Athletic	4–2	Deal Town
93	Retford Town	4–0	Creswell Colliery
94	Rothwell Town	0–3	Rushden Town
95	Sankey Of Wellington	2–3	Worcester City
96	Selby Town	0–0	Goole Town
97	Shildon	0–1	Ryhope Colliery Welfare
98	Sittingbourne	3–3	Erith & Belvedere
99	South Bank	2–5	Spennymoor United
100	South Liverpool	3–0	Prescot Cables
101	St Albans City	3–0	Bletchley Town
102	Stonehouse	1–1	Llanelli
103	Stork	2–2	New Brighton
104	Stourbridge	0–1	Lockheed Leamington
105	Tooting & Mitcham United	5–0	Marlow
106	Tow Law Town	4–0	Stockton
107	Wealdstone	0–1	Hertford Town
108	Wellingborough Town	3–0	Eynesbury Rovers
109	Wembley	0–2	Hornchurch
110	West Auckland Town	4–1	Boldon Colliery Welfare
111	Whitby Town	4–2	Willington
112	Whitley Bay	4–0	Durham City
113	Woodford Town	1–3	Ilford
114	Worthing	0–0	Lancing
115	Yiewsley	2–2	Southall

=== Replays ===
Tie	Home team	Score	Away team
3	Billingham Synthonia	0–2	Ashington
14	Horden Colliery Welfare	2–1	Bishop Auckland
20	Harrogate Town	0–2	Bridlington Town
24	Sutton Town	2–0	Buxton
42	Tunbridge Wells United	2–0	Eastbourne
48	Yorkshire Amateur	0–4	Farsley Celtic
55	Merthyr Tydfil	2–3	Gloucester City
61	Ware	0–0	Harlow Town
64	Crawley Town	7–2	Haywards Heath
68	Boston United	0–1	Holbeach United
75	Atherstone Town	1–3	Long Eaton United
77	Barry Town	3–1	Lovells Athletic
81	Skelmersdale United	3–0	Marine
86	Hemel Hempstead	6–0	Newbury Town
96	Goole Town	3–2	Selby Town
98	Erith & Belvedere	1–2	Sittingbourne
102	Llanelli	1–0	Stonehouse
103	New Brighton	2–2	Stork
114	Lancing	3–2	Worthing
115	Southall	0–3	Yiewsley

=== 2nd replay ===
Tie	Home team	Score	Away team
61	Ware	2–1	Harlow Town
103	New Brighton	3–0	Stork

== 2nd qualifying round ==
=== Ties ===
Tie	Home team	Score	Away team
1	Andover	1–1	Cowes
2	Ashton United	2–2	South Liverpool
3	Banbury Spencer	2–3	Maidenhead United
4	Barking	1–2	Ilford
5	Barnet	3–1	Hertford Town
6	Barry Town	0–1	Llanelli
7	Belper Town	2–3	Matlock Town
8	Bexley United	0–0	Bromley
9	Bideford	2–0	Barnstaple Town
10	Biggleswade & District	5–4	St Albans City
11	Borough United	1–1	New Brighton
12	Bridlington Town	4–1	Goole Town
13	Bungay Town	2–2	Great Yarmouth Town
14	Canterbury City	0–1	Ramsgate Athletic
15	Carshalton Athletic	0–3	Tooting & Mitcham United
16	Chatteris Town	0–5	Bury Town
17	Chichester City	1–2	Basingstoke Town
18	Chorley	6–1	Nelson
19	Corby Town	4–2	Bourne Town
20	Dagenham	2–0	Hornchurch
21	Dorchester Town	1–0	Bridport
22	Epsom & Ewell	0–8	Walthamstow Avenue
23	Ferryhill Athletic	4–1	Ryhope Colliery Welfare
24	Fleetwood	1–2	Lancaster City
25	Folkestone	2–0	Sheppey United
26	Frickley Colliery	3–0	Farsley Celtic
27	Gloucester City	1–2	Cheltenham Town
28	Grantham	2–0	Holbeach United
29	Harwich & Parkeston	3–2	Lowestoft Town
30	Hastings United	2–5	Tonbridge
31	Hayes	3–1	Finchley
32	Heanor Town	5–1	Sutton Town
33	Hemel Hempstead	5–0	Oxford City
34	Hendon	8–0	Clapton
35	Horden Colliery Welfare	1–0	West Auckland Town
36	Ilkeston Town	1–1	Loughborough United
37	Leatherhead	3–2	Kingstonian
38	Letchworth Town	1–2	Hitchin Town
39	Lewes	3–0	Lancing
40	Littlehampton Town	0–4	Crawley Town
41	Lostock Gralam	4–4	Northwich Victoria
42	Lytham	1–1	Hyde United
43	Minehead	3–1	Weston Super Mare
44	Moor Green	1–2	Kidderminster Harriers
45	Mossley	0–5	Macclesfield
46	Netherfield	2–0	Burscough
47	Norton Woodseats	1–6	Gainsborough Trinity
48	Nuneaton Borough	2–1	Halesowen Town
49	Rugby Town	1–1	Lockheed Leamington
50	Runcorn	1–2	Bangor City
51	Rushden Town	0–2	Wellingborough Town
52	Scarborough	2–1	North Shields
53	Sittingbourne	1–1	Cray Wanderers
54	Skegness Town	2–4	Stamford
55	Skelmersdale United	0–3	Altrincham
56	Stanley United	3–0	Ashington
57	Sudbury Town	2–4	Cambridge City
58	Tamworth	3–1	Long Eaton United
59	Taunton	1–3	Bridgwater Town
60	Tilbury	3–3	Aveley
61	Tow Law Town	3–1	Whitley Bay
62	Trowbridge Town	1–1	Chippenham Town
63	Tunbridge Wells United	1–3	Maidstone United
64	Uxbridge	0–0	Yiewsley
65	Wadebridge Town	1–1	St Blazey
66	Ware	2–1	Harrow Town
67	Warminster Town	2–2	Salisbury
68	Wellington Town	0–1	Worcester City
69	Westbury United	0–3	Welton Rovers
70	Whitby Town	2–2	Spennymoor United
71	Woking	0–2	Guildford City
72	Worksop Town	2–0	Retford Town

=== Replays ===
Tie	Home team	Score	Away team
1	Cowes	4–2	Andover
2	South Liverpool	3–1	Ashton United
8	Bromley	2–2	Bexley United
11	New Brighton	3–1	Borough United
13	Great Yarmouth Town	2–1	Bungay Town
36	Loughborough United	4–0	Ilkeston Town
41	Northwich Victoria	4–0	Lostock Gralam
42	Hyde United	5–0	Lytham
49	Lockheed Leamington	2–2	Rugby Town
53	Cray Wanderers	0–1	Sittingbourne
60	Aveley	2–1	Tilbury
62	Chippenham Town	2–4	Trowbridge Town
64	Yiewsley	2–1	Uxbridge
65	St Blazey	8–1	Wadebridge Town
67	Salisbury	4–0	Warminster Town
70	Spennymoor United	0–2	Whitby Town

=== 2nd replays ===
Tie	Home team	Score	Away team
8	Bexley United	1–0	Bromley
49	Rugby Town	1–2	Lockheed Leamington

== 3rd qualifying round ==
=== Ties ===
Tie	Home team	Score	Away team
1	Altrincham	3–0	South Liverpool
2	Aveley	0–1	Ilford
3	Bangor City	2–0	New Brighton
4	Bideford	3–1	St Blazey
5	Biggleswade & District	2–2	Hitchin Town
6	Bury Town	0–3	Cambridge City
7	Cheltenham Town	0–1	Llanelli
8	Chorley	2–0	Hyde United
9	Corby Town	3–1	Wellingborough Town
10	Cowes	3–1	Basingstoke Town
11	Crawley Town	0–2	Lewes
12	Dorchester Town	1–1	Salisbury
13	Frickley Colliery	1–0	Bridlington Town
14	Grantham	4–2	Stamford
15	Guildford City	5–1	Leatherhead
16	Harwich & Parkeston	2–1	Great Yarmouth Town
17	Hayes	2–0	Yiewsley
18	Hendon	3–0	Dagenham
19	Horden Colliery Welfare	3–2	Ferryhill Athletic
20	Maidenhead United	2–1	Hemel Hempstead
21	Maidstone United	1–5	Tonbridge
22	Matlock Town	0–1	Heanor Town
23	Minehead	0–1	Bridgwater Town
24	Netherfield	2–0	Lancaster City
25	Northwich Victoria	1–1	Macclesfield
26	Nuneaton Borough	0–2	Lockheed Leamington
27	Ramsgate Athletic	1–3	Folkestone
28	Scarborough	0–2	Tow Law Town
29	Sittingbourne	0–2	Bexley United
30	Stanley United	2–0	Whitby Town
31	Tamworth	0–0	Loughborough United
32	Trowbridge Town	3–0	Welton Rovers
33	Walthamstow Avenue	3–6	Tooting & Mitcham United
34	Ware	1–6	Barnet
35	Worcester City	4–1	Kidderminster Harriers
36	Worksop Town	1–3	Gainsborough Trinity

=== Replays ===
Tie	Home team	Score	Away team
5	Hitchin Town	5–1	Biggleswade & District
12	Salisbury	1–3	Dorchester Town
25	Macclesfield	1–0	Northwich Victoria
31	Loughborough United	2–0	Tamworth

== 4th qualifying round ==
The teams that given byes to this round are Crook Town, Gateshead, Wycombe Wanderers, Yeovil Town, Hereford United, South Shield, King's Lynn, Chelmsford City, Rhyl, Blyth Spartans, Margate, Bath City, Ashford Town (Kent), Kettering Town, Weymouth, Morecambe, Romford, Cambridge United, Bedford Town, Hinckley Athletic, Enfield, Wigan Athletic, Falmouth Town and Gravesend & Northfleet.

=== Ties ===
Tie	Home team	Score	Away team
1	Altrincham	3–1	Rhyl
2	Barnet	6–3	Wycombe Wanderers
3	Bath City	2–0	Falmouth Town
4	Bedford Town	2–2	Cambridge City
5	Blyth Spartans	1–0	Tow Law Town
6	Bridgwater Town	0–0	Llanelli
7	Cambridge United	4–1	Hitchin Town
8	Chelmsford City	2–0	Romford
9	Enfield	3–1	Hendon
10	Folkestone	3–0	Ashford Town (Kent)
11	Gateshead	5–3	South Shields
12	Gravesend & Northfleet	2–1	Lewes
13	Guildford City	0–0	Bexley United
14	Harwich & Parkeston	4–0	King's Lynn
15	Hayes	1–2	Tooting & Mitcham United
16	Heanor Town	2–0	Gainsborough Trinity
17	Hereford United	1–1	Hinckley Athletic
18	Horden Colliery Welfare	0–3	Netherfield
19	Ilford	1–3	Maidenhead United
20	Kettering Town	3–1	Grantham
21	Lockheed Leamington	2–2	Corby Town
22	Loughborough United	4–1	Worcester City
23	Macclesfield	1–3	Frickley Colliery
24	Margate	2–1	Tonbridge
25	Morecambe	3–4	Chorley
26	Stanley United	0–2	Crook Town
27	Trowbridge Town	2–2	Bideford
28	Weymouth	3–0	Dorchester Town
29	Wigan Athletic	1–1	Bangor City
30	Cowes	0-1	Yeovil Town

=== Replays ===
Tie	Home team	Score	Away team
4	Cambridge City	2–3	Bedford Town
6	Llanelli	0–1	Bridgwater Town
13	Bexley United	3–0	Guildford City
17	Hinckley Athletic	1–1	Hereford United
21	Corby Town	2–0	Lockheed Leamington
27	Bideford	2–4	Trowbridge Town
29	Bangor City	1–0	Wigan Athletic

=== 2nd replay ===
Tie	Home team	Score	Away team
17	Hereford United	3–2	Hinckley Athletic

== 1963–64 FA Cup ==
See 1963-64 FA Cup for details of the rounds from the first round proper onwards.
