= 1968–69 West Midlands (Regional) League =

The 1968–69 West Midlands (Regional) League season was the 69th in the history of the West Midlands (Regional) League, an English association football competition for semi-professional and amateur teams based in the West Midlands county, Shropshire, Herefordshire, Worcestershire and southern Staffordshire.

== Premier Division ==
West Midlands League Premier Division
- Season: 1968–69
- Champions: Kidderminster Harriers
- Matches: 380
- Goals: 1,306 (3.44 per match)

The Premier Division featured 19 clubs which competed in the division last season, along with one new club:

- Eastwood Hanley, joined from the Mid-Cheshire League

=== League table ===
Pos	Team	Pld	W	D	L	GF	GA	GR	Pts	Promotion or relegation
1	Kidderminster Harriers	38	32	4	2	123	25	4.920	68	
2	Tamworth	38	27	5	6	109	41	2.659	59	
3	Hednesford	38	26	7	5	98	43	2.279	59	
4	Bromsgrove Rovers	38	24	5	9	90	46	1.957	53	
5	Atherstone Town	38	22	6	10	76	53	1.434	50	
6	Halesowen Town	38	20	8	10	88	53	1.660	48	
7	Cinderford Town	38	18	7	13	81	74	1.095	43	Transferred to the Gloucestershire County League
8	Redditch	38	17	8	13	72	52	1.385	42	
9	Stourbridge	38	16	9	13	67	68	0.985	41	
10	Dudley Town	38	13	14	11	45	39	1.154	40	
11	Eastwood Hanley	38	13	9	16	59	70	0.843	35	
12	Lower Gornal Athletic	38	13	8	17	47	62	0.758	34	
13	Brierley Hill Alliance	38	12	6	20	51	85	0.600	30	
14	Bilston	38	10	9	19	51	79	0.646	29	
15	Lye Town	38	9	8	21	56	83	0.675	26	
16	Darlaston	38	10	4	24	42	70	0.600	24	
17	Bedworth United	38	8	8	22	42	80	0.525	24	
18	Stratford Town Amateurs	38	8	6	24	37	73	0.507	22	
19	Wolverhampton Wanderers "A"	38	8	4	26	35	91	0.385	20	
20	Hinckley Athletic	38	4	5	29	37	119	0.311	13	

Source: nonleaguematters
Rules for classification: 1) points; 2) goal ratio.
