= 1962–63 FA Cup qualifying rounds =

Tournament details
- Country: England; Wales

The FA Cup 1962–63 is the 82nd season of the world's oldest football knockout competition; The Football Association Challenge Cup, or FA Cup for short. The large number of clubs entering the tournament from lower down the English football league system meant that the competition started with a number of preliminary and qualifying rounds. The 30 victorious teams from the fourth round qualifying progressed to the first round proper.

== 1st qualifying round ==
=== Ties ===
Tie	Home team	Score	Away team
1	Alford United	1–1	Holbeach United
2	Alfreton Town	1–0	Heanor Town
3	Alton Town	2–0	Newport I O W
4	Altrincham	1–0	Marine
5	Andover	4–1	Cowes
6	Arnold St Mary's	3–2	Matlock Town
7	Ashington	4–3	Willington
8	Ashton United	2–0	Prescot Cables
9	Atherstone Town	1–1	Ilkeston Town
10	Aveley	1–0	Woodford Town
11	Aylesbury United	8–0	Huntley & Palmers
12	Bacup Borough	0–3	Stalybridge Celtic
13	Banbury Spencer	0–2	Oxford City
14	Bangor City	4–0	New Brighton
15	Barking	0–4	Ilford
16	Barnet	2–0	Hertford Town
17	Barry Town	2–0	Stonehouse
18	Basingstoke Town	4–2	Fareham Town
19	Bedford Town	8–0	Wolverton Town & B R
20	Bedlington Mechanics	3–1	Whitby Town
21	Belper Town w/o-scr South Normanton Miners Welfare		
22	Biggleswade & District	3–3	Letchworth Town
23	Billingham Synthonia	2–2	Horden Colliery Welfare
24	Bilston	2–3	Hednesford Town
25	Bishop's Stortford	1–0	Ware
26	Boldon Colliery Welfare	1–2	Ferryhill Athletic
27	Borough United	4–0	Stork
28	Bourne Town	4–1	Rushden Town
29	Brentwood & Warley	3–2	Rainham Town
30	Bridgwater Town	1–1	Weston Super Mare
31	Bridlington Town	1–1	Scarborough
32	Bridport	1–5	Portland United
33	Bromley	2–1	Bexleyheath & Welling
34	Bromsgrove Rovers	7–1	Oswestry Town
35	Burscough	1–4	Fleetwood
36	Burton Albion	1–1	Long Eaton United
37	Bury Town	4–1	Chatteris Town
38	Buxton	2–1	Sutton Town
39	Cambridge City	3–0	St Albans City
40	Canterbury City	0–3	Folkestone
41	Carshalton Athletic	4–0	Marlow
42	Cheltenham Town	1–0	Llanelli
43	Chichester City	2–3	Newbury Town
44	Chorley	10–2	Lytham
45	Clapton	2–3	Hornchurch
46	Clitheroe	4–1	Lancaster City
47	Congleton Town	1–1	Wellington Town
48	Consett	2–0	Spennymoor United
49	Creswell Colliery	1–5	Frickley Colliery
50	Dagenham	0–3	Leyton
51	Denaby United	4–0	Retford Town
52	Dorking	2–3	Metropolitan Police
53	Droylsden	3–3	Macclesfield
54	Dulwich Hamlet	6–1	Redhill
55	Earlestown	1–3	St Helens Town
56	Easington Colliery Welfare	1–6	Stanley United
57	Eastbourne	3–4	Tunbridge Wells United
58	Eastbourne United	4–3	Tonbridge
59	Ebbw Vale	1–1	Lovells Athletic
60	Edgware Town	0–3	Yiewsley
61	Ellesmere Port Town	3–0	Pwllheli & District
62	Epsom & Ewell	1–3	Slough Town
63	Evenwood Town	0–0	Annfield Plain
64	Eynesbury Rovers	0–5	St Neots Town
65	Falmouth Town	1–1	Barnstaple Town
66	Farsley Celtic	1–0	Goole Town
67	Finchley	4–0	Southall
68	Ford United	8–1	Wembley
69	Gainsborough Trinity	3–1	Stocksbridge Works
70	Glastonbury	0–6	Frome Town
71	Gloucester City	3–2	Merthyr Tydfil
72	Grantham	5–2	Louth United
73	Gravesend & Northfleet	2–1	Chatham Town
74	Grays Athletic	1–2	Tilbury
75	Great Yarmouth Town	3–2	Bungay Town
76	Gresley Rovers	2–2	Tamworth
77	Harlow Town	0–2	Wealdstone
78	Harrow Town	5–2	Wokingham Town
79	Hastings United	0–0	Maidstone United
80	Hayes	3–0	Uxbridge
81	Haywards Heath	4–0	Lancing
82	Hemel Hempstead	3–0	Chesham United
83	Hendon	1–0	Leytonstone
84	Hinckley Athletic	4–2	Loughborough United
85	Hitchin Town	0–0	Vauxhall Motors
86	Horwich R M I	2–2	Netherfield
87	Hyde United	3–0	Nelson
88	Kidderminster Harriers	1–0	Sankey Of Wellington
89	Kingstonian	5–0	Walton & Hersham
90	Leatherhead	1–4	Wimbledon
91	Lewes	5–1	Horsham
92	Leyland Motors	1–5	Rossendale United
93	Linotype & Machinery	1–2	Mossley
94	Llandudno	2–3	Runcorn
95	Lostock Gralam	3–1	Northwich Victoria
96	Lowestoft Town	4–2	Clacton Town
97	Maidenhead United	2–1	Windsor & Eton
98	March Town United	4–1	Ely City
99	Melksham Town	0–5	Devizes Town
100	Moor Green	0–6	Stafford Rangers
101	Newhaven	0–0	Bexhill Town
102	Norton Woodseats	1–3	Worksop Town
103	Nuneaton Borough	6–0	Halesowen Town
104	Petters Sports	0–2	Woking
105	Rugby Town	2–1	Stourbridge
106	Ruislip Manor	0–2	Tooting & Mitcham United
107	Salisbury	2–2	Chippenham Town
108	Selby Town	1–5	Ossett Albion
109	Sheppey United	0–1	Dover
110	Shildon	3–1	Durham City
111	Sittingbourne	10–0	Whitstable
112	South Bank	0–0	Ryhope Colliery Welfare
113	South Liverpool	3–1	Skelmersdale United
114	Spalding United	1–3	Boston United
115	Stevenage Town	0–2	Enfield
116	Stockton	2–1	Penrith
117	Stowmarket	2–1	Gorleston
118	Sutton United	4–1	Cray Wanderers
119	Swanage Town	0–8	Poole Town
120	Truro City	0–3	Bideford
121	Wellingborough Town	0–0	Corby Town
122	Wigan Athletic	5–0	Milnthorpe Corinthians
123	Winsford United	3–0	Witton Albion
124	Worthing	1–2	Bognor Regis Town

=== Replays ===
Tie	Home team	Score	Away team
1	Holbeach United	6–4	Alford United
9	Ilkeston Town	1–2	Atherstone Town
22	Letchworth Town	1–1	Biggleswade & District (Abandoned in extra time)
23	Horden Colliery Welfare	4–2	Billingham Synthonia
30	Weston Super Mare	0–0	Bridgwater Town
31	Scarborough	5–2	Bridlington Town
36	Long Eaton United	0–3	Burton Albion
47	Wellington Town	2–0	Congleton Town
53	Macclesfield	2–2	Droylsden (Abandoned in extra time)
59	Lovells Athletic	4–1	Ebbw Vale
63	Annfield Plain	2–1	Evenwood Town
65	Barnstaple Town	1–3	Falmouth Town
76	Tamworth	4–1	Gresley Rovers
79	Maidstone United	4–2	Hastings United
85	Vauxhall Motors	0–3	Hitchin Town
86	Netherfield	3–2	Horwich R M I
101	Newhaven	0–2	Bexhill Town
107	Chippenham Town	3–1	Salisbury
112	Ryhope Colliery Welfare	2–1	South Bank
121	Corby Town	1–0	Wellingborough Town

=== 2nd replay ===
Tie	Home team	Score	Away team
22	Letchworth Town	0–3	Biggleswade & District
30	Bridgwater Town	3–1	Weston Super Mare
53	Droylsden	3–2	Macclesfield

== 2nd qualifying round ==
=== Ties ===
Tie	Home team	Score	Away team
1	Alfreton Town	0–4	Arnold St Mary's
2	Altrincham	4–2	Ashton United
3	Andover	2–1	Basingstoke Town
4	Annfield Plain	2–2	Whitley Bay
5	Atherstone Town	2–1	Burton Albion
6	Bangor City	1–2	Ellesmere Port Town
7	Belper Town	3–4	Buxton
8	Bideford	0–0	Wadebridge Town
9	Bishop's Stortford	0–2	Wealdstone
10	Bognor Regis Town	2–5	Haywards Heath
11	Boston United	3–2	Grantham
12	Bourne Town	5–1	Stamford
13	Bridgwater Town	5–1	Taunton
14	Bromley	2–3	Erith & Belvedere
15	Bromsgrove Rovers	0–0	Kidderminster Harriers
16	Bury Town	0–2	Cambridge United
17	Cambridge City	5–0	Biggleswade & District
18	Carshalton Athletic	2–3	Dulwich Hamlet
19	Cheltenham Town	5–1	Lovells Athletic
20	Chippenham Town	4–1	Westbury United
21	Chorley	2–2	Hyde United
22	Clitheroe	0–4	Netherfield
23	Consett	1–1	North Shields
24	Corby Town	1–0	St Neots Town
25	Denaby United	1–2	Gainsborough Trinity
26	Devizes Town	2–3	Trowbridge Town
27	Dover	4–1	Ramsgate Athletic
28	Droylsden	0–0	Mossley
29	Eastbourne United	0–1	Tunbridge Wells United
30	Enfield	4–1	Barnet
31	Falmouth Town	1–0	St Blazey
32	Ferryhill Athletic	2–2	Ryhope Colliery Welfare
33	Finchley	1–1	Hayes
34	Frome Town	2–2	Minehead
35	Gloucester City	3–0	Barry Town
36	Gravesend & Northfleet	2–1	Sutton United
37	Great Yarmouth Town	1–3	Harwich & Parkeston
38	Hemel Hempstead	2–0	Aylesbury United
39	Hendon	2–1	Ford United
40	Hinckley Athletic	0–0	Tamworth
41	Hitchin Town	2–5	Bedford Town
42	Holbeach United	2–3	Skegness Town
43	Hornchurch	1–2	Leyton
44	Ilford	4–1	Brentwood & Warley
45	Lewes	6–2	Littlehampton Town
46	Lostock Gralam	0–3	Winsford United
47	Maidenhead United	3–2	Yiewsley
48	Maidstone United	5–0	Bexhill Town
49	March Town United	1–3	Sudbury Town
50	Metropolitan Police	1–2	Kingstonian
51	Newbury Town	1–9	Alton Town
52	Nuneaton Borough	2–1	Lockheed Leamington
53	Ossett Albion	2–1	Farsley Celtic
54	Oxford City	4–2	Harrow Town
55	Poole Town	10–1	Warminster Town
56	Portland United	1–3	Dorchester Town
57	Rossendale United	2–4	Stalybridge Celtic
58	Rugby Town	2–0	Hednesford Town
59	Runcorn	0–1	Borough United
60	Scarborough	5–1	Harrogate Town
61	Shildon	4–0	Bedlington Mechanics
62	Sittingbourne	2–2	Folkestone
63	Slough Town	0–4	Tooting & Mitcham United
64	St Helens Town	2–1	South Liverpool
65	Stafford Rangers	0–2	Wellington Town
66	Stanley United	0–1	Horden Colliery Welfare
67	Stockton w/o-scr Ashington		
68	Stowmarket	1–2	Lowestoft Town
69	Tilbury	2–1	Aveley
70	Wigan Athletic	8–1	Fleetwood
71	Wimbledon	4–2	Woking
72	Worksop Town	1–0	Frickley Colliery

=== Replays ===
Tie	Home team	Score	Away team
4	Whitley Bay	0–1	Annfield Plain
8	Wadebridge Town	2–5	Bideford
15	Kidderminster Harriers	1–3	Bromsgrove Rovers
21	Hyde United	3–0	Chorley
23	North Shields	5–2	Consett
28	Mossley	1–2	Droylsden
32	Ryhope Colliery Welfare	1–0	Ferryhill Athletic
33	Hayes	1–2	Finchley
34	Minehead	4–0	Frome Town
40	Tamworth	0–1	Hinckley Athletic
62	Folkestone	1–2	Sittingbourne

== 3rd qualifying round ==
=== Ties ===
Tie	Home team	Score	Away team
1	Alton Town	1–1	Andover
2	Bedford Town	2–1	Cambridge City
3	Borough United	0–1	Ellesmere Port Town
4	Boston United	1–0	Skegness Town
5	Bridgwater Town	1–3	Minehead
6	Buxton	6–3	Arnold St Mary's
7	Cambridge United	6–0	Sudbury Town
8	Chippenham Town	0–1	Trowbridge Town
9	Corby Town	4–1	Bourne Town
10	Dorchester Town	0–3	Poole Town
11	Falmouth Town	1–1	Bideford
12	Gloucester City	1–2	Cheltenham Town
13	Gravesend & Northfleet	5–0	Erith & Belvedere
14	Haywards Heath	0–3	Lewes
15	Hendon	4–1	Leyton
16	Hinckley Athletic	3–1	Atherstone Town
17	Horden Colliery Welfare	2–0	Annfield Plain
18	Lowestoft Town	4–0	Harwich & Parkeston
19	Maidenhead United	3–1	Finchley
20	Netherfield	0–3	Wigan Athletic
21	Ossett Albion	1–2	Scarborough
22	Oxford City	4–3	Hemel Hempstead
23	Rugby Town	1–0	Nuneaton Borough
24	Ryhope Colliery Welfare	1–2	Stockton
25	Shildon	3–3	North Shields
26	Sittingbourne	2–1	Dover
27	St Helens Town	1–3	Altrincham
28	Stalybridge Celtic	1–1	Hyde United
29	Tilbury	1–0	Ilford
30	Tooting & Mitcham United	5–1	Dulwich Hamlet
31	Tunbridge Wells United	0–1	Maidstone United
32	Wealdstone	1–5	Enfield
33	Wellington Town	2–0	Bromsgrove Rovers
34	Wimbledon	3–2	Kingstonian
35	Winsford United	0–1	Droylsden
36	Worksop Town	0–0	Gainsborough Trinity

=== Replays ===
Tie	Home team	Score	Away team
1	Andover	4–1	Alton Town
11	Bideford	0–3	Falmouth Town
25	North Shields	5–2	Shildon
28	Hyde United	3–0	Stalybridge Celtic
36	Gainsborough Trinity	2–1	Worksop Town

== 4th qualifying round ==
The teams that given byes to this round are Walthamstow Avenue, West Auckland Town, Gateshead, Bishop Auckland, Wycombe Wanderers, Yeovil Town, Hereford United, South Shields, Worcester City, King's Lynn, Guildford City, Chelmsford City, Rhyl, Blyth Spartans, Margate, Bath City, Wisbech Town, Ashford Town, Kettering Town, Weymouth, Morecombe, Romford, Dartford and Brierley Hill Alliance.

=== Ties ===
Tie	Home team	Score	Away team
1	Altrincham	2–3	Rhyl
2	Bedford Town	1–0	Wisbech Town
3	Blyth Spartans	2–1	Horden Colliery Welfare
4	Boston United	2–0	Kettering Town
5	Brierley Hill Alliance	1–3	Hinckley Athletic
6	Cambridge United	4–0	Lowestoft Town
7	Chelmsford City	2–0	Romford
8	Dartford	2–0	Maidstone United
9	Falmouth Town	2–1	Bath City
10	Gainsborough Trinity	0–0	Buxton
11	Gateshead	2–2	West Auckland Town
12	Gravesend & Northfleet	1–0	Lewes
13	Guildford City	0–0	Sittingbourne
14	Hendon	1–1	Andover
15	King's Lynn	2–1	Corby Town
16	Maidenhead United	2–1	Tilbury
17	Margate	2–0	Ashford Town (Kent)
18	Minehead	0–1	Cheltenham Town
19	Morecambe	1–0	Droylsden
20	North Shields	2–2	Stockton
21	Poole Town	0–0	Weymouth
22	Rugby Town	1–1	Wellington Town
23	Scarborough	1–0	Hyde United
24	South Shields	2–1	Bishop Auckland
25	Tooting & Mitcham United	2–3	Enfield
26	Walthamstow Avenue	1–1	Wycombe Wanderers
27	Wigan Athletic	2–0	Ellesmere Port Town
28	Wimbledon	6–1	Oxford City
29	Worcester City	0–2	Hereford United
30	Yeovil Town	4–0	Trowbridge Town

=== Replays ===
Tie	Home team	Score	Away team
10	Buxton	4–1	Gainsborough Trinity
11	West Auckland Town	0–2	Gateshead
13	Sittingbourne	1–0	Guildford City
13	Andover	5–4	Hendon
20	Stockton	3–3	North Shields
21	Weymouth	0–2	Poole Town
22	Wellington Town	4–0	Rugby Town
26	Wycombe Wanderers	3–1	Walthamstow Avenue

=== 2nd replay ===
Tie	Home team	Score	Away team
20	North Shields	4–2	Stockton

== 1962–63 FA Cup ==
See 1962-63 FA Cup for details of the rounds from the first round proper onwards.
