= 1969–70 West Midlands (Regional) League =

The 1969–70 West Midlands (Regional) League season was the 70th in the history of the West Midlands (Regional) League, an English association football competition for semi-professional and amateur teams based in the West Midlands county, Shropshire, Herefordshire, Worcestershire and southern Staffordshire.

== Premier Division ==
West Midlands League Premier Division
- Season: 1969–70
- Champions: Kidderminster Harriers
- Matches: 342
- Goals: 1,176 (3.44 per match)

The Premier Division featured 19 clubs which competed in the division last season, no new clubs joined the division this season.

=== League table ===
Pos	Team	Pld	W	D	L	GF	GA	GR	Pts	Promotion or relegation
1	Kidderminster Harriers	36	26	7	3	115	34	3.382	59	
2	Bromsgrove Rovers	36	27	2	7	105	32	3.281	56	
3	Stourbridge	36	23	9	4	101	37	2.730	55	
4	Tamworth	36	23	7	6	101	50	2.020	53	
5	Hednesford	36	22	6	8	98	53	1.849	50	
6	Atherstone Town	36	20	8	8	68	38	1.789	48	
7	Redditch	36	15	9	12	53	60	0.883	39	
8	Bedworth United	36	13	11	12	49	51	0.961	37	
9	Halesowen Town	36	15	6	15	61	54	1.130	36	
10	Bilston	36	12	11	13	53	56	0.946	35	
11	Eastwood Hanley	36	13	8	15	62	78	0.795	34	
12	Lower Gornal Athletic	36	13	7	16	50	65	0.769	33	
13	Wolverhampton Wanderers "A"	36	11	8	17	43	63	0.683	30	
14	Brierley Hill Alliance	36	8	12	16	37	59	0.627	28	
15	Dudley Town	36	8	10	18	41	58	0.707	26	
16	Lye Town	36	6	7	23	39	95	0.411	19	
17	Darlaston	36	7	3	26	40	108	0.370	17	
18	Stratford Town Amateurs	36	7	3	26	30	91	0.330	17	Transferred to the Midland Football Combination
19	Hinckley Athletic	36	5	2	29	30	94	0.319	12	

Source: nonleaguematters
Rules for classification: 1) points; 2) goal ratio.
