= 1996–97 West Midlands (Regional) League =

West Midlands league

The 1996–97 West Midlands (Regional) League season was the 97th in the history of the West Midlands (Regional) League, an English association football competition for semi-professional and amateur teams based in the West Midlands county, Shropshire, Herefordshire, Worcestershire and southern Staffordshire.

== Premier Division ==
West Midlands League Premier Division
- Season: 1996–97
- Champions: Wednesfield
- Promoted: Wednesfield
- Matches: 306
- Goals: 1,090 (3.56 per match)

The Premier Division featured 17 clubs which competed in the division last season, along with one new club:

- Wolverhampton United, promoted from Division One

Also, Darlaston changed name to Darlaston Town.

=== League table ===
Pos	Team	Pld	W	D	L	GF	GA	GD	Pts	Promotion or relegation
1	Wednesfield	34	26	5	3	103	25	+78	83	Promoted to the Midland Football Alliance
2	Stourport Swifts	34	24	5	5	103	34	+69	77	
3	Bloxwich Strollers	34	23	7	4	84	29	+55	76	
4	Lye Town	34	20	6	8	82	40	+42	66	
5	Brierley Hill Town	34	20	5	9	83	44	+39	65	
6	Stafford Town	34	17	9	8	57	40	+17	60	
7	Wolverhampton Casuals	34	17	7	10	72	69	+3	58	
8	Gornal Athletic	34	15	8	11	55	48	+7	53	
9	Ludlow Town	34	15	7	12	63	57	+6	52	
10	Westfields	34	13	8	13	50	53	−3	47	
11	Tividale	34	12	8	14	53	78	−25	44	
12	Darlaston Town	34	10	9	15	49	60	−11	39	
13	Ettingshall Holy Trinity	34	8	7	19	42	81	−39	31	
14	Cradley Town	34	7	6	21	51	83	−32	27	
15	Malvern Town	34	6	8	20	47	70	−23	26	
16	Walsall Wood	34	6	6	22	35	72	−37	24	
17	Wolverhampton United	34	5	7	22	34	102	−68	22	
18	Hill Top Rangers	34	2	2	30	27	105	−78	8	Resigned from the league

Source: fchd
Rules for classification: 1) points; 2) goal difference; 3) number of goals scored.

== Division One North ==
West Midlands League Division One North
- Season: 1996–97
- Champions: Great Wyrley

The Division One North featured 7 clubs which competed in the Division One last season, along with 6 new clubs:

- Blakenall reserves
- Brereton Town
- Heath Hayes, joined from Midland League
- Corestone Services
- Wolverhampton Casuals reserves, joined from Midland Combination Division Two
- Sporting Khalsa

=== League table ===
Pos	Team	Pld	W	D	L	GF	GA	GD	Pts	Promotion or relegation
1	Great Wyrley	24	20	1	3	66	20	+46	61	
2	Blakenall reserves	24	17	3	4	71	19	+52	54	
3	Brereton Town	24	15	5	4	61	31	+30	50	
4	Brereton Social	24	11	5	8	65	47	+18	38	
5	Morda United	24	11	4	9	50	45	+5	37	
6	Cannock Chase	24	11	3	10	56	57	−1	36	
7	Heath Hayes	24	9	5	10	38	49	−11	32	
8	Sikh Hunters	24	8	4	12	62	72	−10	28	
9	Corestone Services	24	7	7	10	36	59	−23	28	
10	Wolverhampton Casuals reserves	24	8	3	13	45	75	−30	27	
11	Rushall Olympic reserves	24	7	2	15	32	55	−23	23	Resigned from the league
12	Chasetown reserves	24	6	2	16	43	54	−11	20	Resigned from the league
13	Sporting Khalsa	24	2	4	18	24	66	−42	10	Resigned from the league

Source: nonleaguematters
Rules for classification: 1) points; 2) goal ratio; 3) number of goals scored.

== Division One South ==
West Midlands League Division One South
- Season: 1996–97
- Champions: Kington Town
- Promoted: Kington Town; Bustleholme

The Division One South featured 9 clubs which competed in the Division One last season, along with 5 new clubs:

- Kington Town, joined from Mid Wales Football League
- Bustleholme
- Smethwick Rangers
- Leominster Town
- Cradley Town reserves

=== League table ===
Pos	Team	Pld	W	D	L	GF	GA	GD	Pts	Promotion or relegation
1	Kington Town	26	22	2	2	91	35	+56	68	Promoted to the Premier Division
2	Bustleholme	26	16	4	6	62	32	+30	52	Promoted to the Premier Division
3	Bandon	26	15	3	8	70	31	+39	48	Transferred to Division One North
4	Smethwick Rangers	26	14	5	7	50	35	+15	47	
5	Bromyard Town	26	14	2	10	63	43	+20	44	
6	Leominster Town	26	12	4	10	70	58	+12	40	
7	Tipton Town	26	12	4	10	58	55	+3	40	
8	Bilston United	26	11	4	11	57	52	+5	37	Resigned from the league
9	Oldbury United reserves	26	10	7	9	44	42	+2	37	Resigned from the league
10	Mahal	26	10	6	10	51	44	+7	36	
11	Cradley Town reserves	26	6	4	16	43	73	−30	22	
12	Tividale reserves	26	5	4	17	31	81	−50	19	
13	Pershore Town reserves	26	3	6	17	28	78	−50	15	
14	Gornal Athletic reserves	26	1	7	18	27	86	−59	10	

Source: nonleaguematters
Rules for classification: 1) points; 2) goal ratio; 3) number of goals scored.
