= 1997–98 West Midlands (Regional) League =

The 1997–98 West Midlands (Regional) League season was the 98th in the history of the West Midlands (Regional) League, an English association football competition for semi-professional and amateur teams based in the West Midlands county, Shropshire, Herefordshire, Worcestershire and southern Staffordshire.

== Premier Division ==
West Midlands League Premier Division
- Season: 1997–98
- Champions: Lye Town
- Promoted: Stourport Swifts
- Matches: 306
- Goals: 1,140 (3.73 per match)

The Premier Division featured 16 clubs which competed in the division last season, along with two new clubs, promoted from Division One South:

- Bustleholme
- Kington Town

=== League table ===
Pos	Team	Pld	W	D	L	GF	GA	GD	Pts	Promotion or relegation
1	Lye Town	34	26	6	2	91	35	+56	84	
2	Stourport Swifts	34	23	6	5	101	34	+67	75	Promoted to the Midland Football Alliance
3	Brierley Hill Town	34	21	5	8	64	34	+30	68	
4	Kington Town	34	21	3	10	97	67	+30	66	
5	Bloxwich Strollers	34	18	4	12	81	49	+32	58	Resigned from the league
6	Malvern Town	34	17	4	13	73	59	+14	55	
7	Wolverhampton Casuals	34	15	6	13	64	52	+12	51	
8	Gornal Athletic	34	15	5	14	56	50	+6	50	
9	Darlaston Town	34	15	3	16	78	70	+8	48	
10	Tividale	34	15	6	13	64	57	+7	48 (Note: Tividale deducted three points.)	
11	Ludlow Town	34	14	3	17	58	71	−13	45	
12	Stafford Town	34	12	7	15	49	57	−8	43	
13	Walsall Wood	34	11	7	16	49	64	−15	40	
14	Westfields	34	11	5	18	57	69	−12	38	
15	Bustleholme	34	11	3	20	48	76	−28	36	
16	Cradley Town	34	9	5	20	54	80	−26	32	
17	Ettingshall Holy Trinity	34	5	7	22	37	100	−63	22	
18	Wolverhampton United	34	2	5	27	19	116	−97	11	

Source: fchd
Rules for classification: 1) points; 2) goal difference; 3) number of goals scored.

== Division One North ==
West Midlands League Division One North
- Season: 1997–98
- Champions: Bandon
- Promoted: Bandon; Lawson Mardon Star

The Division One North featured 10 clubs which competed in the division last season, along with 5 new clubs:

- Bandon, transferred from Division One South
- Lawson Mardon Star
- Newport
- Lucas Flight Controls
- Walsall Wood reserves

=== League table ===
Pos	Team	Pld	W	D	L	GF	GA	GD	Pts	Promotion or relegation
1	Bandon	28	20	6	2	86	31	+55	66	Promoted to the Premier Division
2	Lawson Mardon Star	28	19	3	6	100	48	+52	60	Promoted to the Premier Division
3	Blakenall reserves	28	17	4	7	78	33	+45	55	Resigned from the league
4	Brereton Social	28	14	7	7	60	43	+17	49	
5	Heath Hayes	28	15	2	11	62	55	+7	47	
6	Great Wyrley	28	14	5	9	55	37	+18	44 (Note: Great Wyrley deducted 3 points.)	
7	Morda United	28	13	5	10	47	47	0	44	
8	Brereton Town	28	13	4	11	63	61	+2	42 (Note: Brereton Town deducted 1 point.)	Resigned from the league
9	Newport	28	11	8	9	64	45	+19	41	
10	Sikh Hunters	28	10	4	14	46	53	−7	34	Transferred to Division One South
11	Lucas Flight Controls	28	8	7	13	60	72	−12	31	
12	Wolverhampton Casuals reserves	28	9	4	15	51	79	−28	31	
13	Corestone Services	28	6	2	20	37	78	−41	20	
14	Cannock Chase	28	6	2	20	40	102	−62	20	
15	Walsall Wood reserves	28	3	1	24	33	98	−65	10	

Source: nonleaguematters
Rules for classification: 1) points; 2) goal ratio; 3) number of goals scored.

== Division One South ==
West Midlands League Division One South
- Season: 1997–98
- Champions: Smethwick Rangers
- Promoted: Smethwick Rangers; Tipton Town

The Division One South featured 9 clubs which competed in the division last season, along with 5 new clubs:

- Halesowen Harriers reserves
- Wellington, joined from Herefordshire League
- Birmingham College of Food
- Malvern Town reserves
- Hinton

=== League table ===
Pos	Team	Pld	W	D	L	GF	GA	GD	Pts	Promotion or relegation
1	Smethwick Rangers	26	18	5	3	75	32	+43	59	Promoted to the Premier Division
2	Tipton Town	26	18	4	4	71	26	+45	58	Promoted to the Premier Division
3	Leominster Town	26	15	4	7	68	44	+24	49	
4	Halesowen Harriers reserves	26	12	7	7	54	35	+19	43	
5	Tividale reserves	26	11	7	8	38	36	+2	40	
6	Bromyard Town	26	11	6	9	62	47	+15	39	
7	Wellington	26	11	4	11	45	53	−8	37	
8	Birmingham College of Food	26	11	3	12	55	48	+7	36	Resigned from the league
9	Cradley Town reserves	26	10	6	10	52	40	+12	36	
10	Malvern Town reserves	26	9	8	9	38	52	−14	35	
11	Mahal	26	10	2	14	54	62	−8	32	
12	Pershore Town reserves	26	3	7	16	28	94	−66	16	
13	Hinton	26	4	3	19	33	67	−34	15	
14	Gornal Athletic reserves	26	2	8	16	18	55	−37	14	Resigned from the league

Source: nonleaguematters
Rules for classification: 1) points; 2) goal ratio; 3) number of goals scored.
