= 1998–99 West Midlands (Regional) League =

The 1998–99 West Midlands (Regional) League season was the 99th in the history of the West Midlands (Regional) League, an English association football competition for semi-professional and amateur teams based in the West Midlands county, Shropshire, Herefordshire, Worcestershire and southern Staffordshire.

== Premier Division ==
West Midlands League Premier Division
- Season: 1998–99
- Champions: Kington Town
- Promoted: Cradley Town
- Relegated: Wolverhampton United
- Matches: 420
- Goals: 1,432 (3.41 per match)

The Premier Division featured 15 clubs which competed in the division last season, along with five new clubs.

- Clubs promoted from Division One North:
  - Bandon
  - Lawson Mardon Star, who also changed name to Star
- Clubs promoted from Division One South:
  - Smethwick Rangers
  - Tipton Town
- Plus:
  - Dudley Town, reformed after resigning from the Southern Football League in 1997

=== League table ===
Pos	Team	Pld	W	D	L	GF	GA	GD	Pts	Promotion or relegation
1	Kington Town	40	32	3	5	120	39	+81	99	
2	Cradley Town	40	28	3	9	98	40	+58	87	Promoted to the Midland Football Alliance
3	Stafford Town	40	27	5	8	89	38	+51	86	
4	Wolverhampton Casuals	40	24	5	11	99	72	+27	77	
5	Smethwick Rangers	40	21	8	11	88	52	+36	71	
6	Darlaston Town	40	21	7	12	81	63	+18	70	
7	Bandon	40	19	7	14	72	53	+19	64	
8	Malvern Town	40	16	12	12	76	62	+14	60	
9	Tipton Town	40	17	6	17	62	75	−13	57	
10	Bustleholme	40	16	7	17	63	71	−8	55	
11	Gornal Athletic	40	14	11	15	68	65	+3	53	
12	Lye Town	40	12	15	13	56	54	+2	51	
13	Star	40	14	8	18	55	63	−8	50	
14	Dudley Town	40	11	13	16	52	67	−15	46	
15	Tividale	40	12	9	19	55	69	−14	45	
16	Brierley Hill Town	40	11	12	17	57	74	−17	45	
17	Westfields	40	9	15	16	57	69	−12	42	
18	Ludlow Town	40	12	5	23	46	82	−36	41	
19	Ettingshall Holy Trinity	40	10	9	21	62	87	−25	39	
20	Walsall Wood	40	5	7	28	43	99	−56	22	
21	Wolverhampton United	40	1	9	30	33	138	−105	12	Relegated to Division One North

Source: fchd
Rules for classification: 1) points; 2) goal difference; 3) number of goals scored.

== Division One North ==
West Midlands League Division One North
- Season: 1998–99
- Champions: Heath Hayes
- Promoted: Heath Hayes; Little Drayton Rangers

The Division One North featured 10 clubs which competed in the division last season, along with 5 new clubs:

- Little Drayton Rangers
- Sedgley White Lions
- Shifnal Town reserves
- Wyrley Rangers
- Wolverhampton Town

=== League table ===
Pos	Team	Pld	W	D	L	GF	GA	GD	Pts	Promotion or relegation
1	Heath Hayes	28	19	5	4	75	28	+47	62	Promoted to the Premier Division
2	Little Drayton Rangers	28	19	6	3	74	24	+50	60 (Note: Little Drayton Rangers deducted 3 points.)	Promoted to the Premier Division
3	Lucas Flight Controls	28	18	4	6	91	37	+54	58	
4	Great Wyrley	28	17	5	6	75	35	+40	56	
5	Brereton Social	28	16	8	4	83	48	+35	56	Resigned from the league
6	Newport	28	17	5	6	62	40	+22	56	
7	Cannock Chase	28	14	7	7	63	43	+20	49	
8	Sedgley White Lions	28	11	7	10	44	38	+6	40	
9	Morda United	28	9	3	16	55	72	−17	30	
10	Shifnal Town reserves	28	9	2	17	42	66	−24	29	
11	Wolverhampton Casuals reserves	28	8	4	16	53	79	−26	28	Resigned from the league
12	Wyrley Rangers	28	6	5	17	39	92	−53	23	Resigned from the league
13	Wolverhampton Town	28	3	7	18	35	71	−36	16	Resigned from the league
14	Corestone Services	28	2	8	18	37	105	−68	14	
15	Walsall Wood reserves	28	2	4	22	25	75	−50	9 (Note: Walsall Wood reserves deducted 1 point.)	

Source: nonleaguematters
Rules for classification: 1) points; 2) goal ratio; 3) number of goals scored.

== Division One South ==
West Midlands League Division One South
- Season: 1998–99
- Champions: Wellington
- Promoted: Causeway United

The Division One South featured 10 clubs which competed in the division last season, along with 4 new clubs:

- Sikh Hunters, transferred from Division One North
- Causeway United
- Lye Town reserves
- Borgfield Celtic

=== League table ===
Pos	Team	Pld	W	D	L	GF	GA	GD	Pts	Promotion or relegation
1	Wellington	26	22	1	3	115	17	+98	67	
2	Causeway United	26	21	1	4	75	24	+51	64	Promoted to the Premier Division
3	Leominster Town	26	13	5	8	57	48	+9	44	
4	Bromyard Town	26	13	3	10	43	34	+9	42	
5	Tividale reserves	26	12	4	10	48	49	−1	40	Resigned from the league
6	Sikh Hunters	26	12	3	11	68	70	−2	39	
7	Halesowen Harriers reserves	26	11	4	11	59	51	+8	37	Resigned from the league
8	Malvern Town reserves	26	9	7	10	45	54	−9	34	
9	Cradley Town reserves	26	10	2	14	43	50	−7	32	
10	Hinton	26	10	2	14	53	68	−15	32	
11	Pershore Town reserves	26	9	4	13	28	50	−22	31	
12	Mahal	26	7	5	14	42	67	−25	26	
13	Lye Town reserves	26	8	1	17	44	91	−47	25	Resigned from the league
14	Borgfield Celtic	26	3	2	21	36	83	−47	11	Transferred to Division One North

Source: nonleaguematters
Rules for classification: 1) points; 2) goal ratio; 3) number of goals scored.
