= 2002–03 West Midlands (Regional) League =

The 2002–03 West Midlands (Regional) League season was the 103rd in the history of the West Midlands (Regional) League, an English association football competition for semi-professional and amateur teams based in the West Midlands county, Shropshire, Herefordshire, Worcestershire and southern Staffordshire.

== Premier Division ==
West Midlands League Premier Division
- Season: 2002–03
- Champions: Westfields
- Promoted: Westfields
- Relegated: Gornal Athletic; Walsall Wood
- Matches: 462
- Goals: 1,680 (3.64 per match)

The Premier Division featured 21 clubs which competed in the division last season, along with one new club:

- Sedgeley White Lions, promoted from Division One South

Also, Smethwick Rangers changed name to Smethwick Sikh Temple.

=== League table ===
| Pos | Team | Pld | W | D | L | GF | GA | GD | Pts | Promotion or relegation |
|---|---|---|---|---|---|---|---|---|---|---|
| 1 | Westfields | 42 | 31 | 6 | 5 | 119 | 39 | +80 | 99 | Promoted to the Midland Football Alliance |
| 2 | Kington Town | 42 | 31 | 6 | 5 | 121 | 51 | +70 | 99 | |
| 3 | Tipton Town | 42 | 27 | 8 | 7 | 95 | 40 | +55 | 89 | |
| 4 | Little Drayton Rangers | 42 | 26 | 5 | 11 | 113 | 66 | +47 | 83 | |
| 5 | Tividale | 42 | 22 | 10 | 10 | 104 | 53 | +51 | 76 | |
| 6 | Malvern Town | 42 | 22 | 9 | 11 | 96 | 49 | +47 | 75 | |
| 7 | Shawbury United | 42 | 21 | 9 | 12 | 86 | 68 | +18 | 72 | |
| 8 | Lye Town | 42 | 19 | 7 | 16 | 69 | 64 | +5 | 64 | |
| 9 | Ledbury Town | 42 | 18 | 9 | 15 | 90 | 75 | +15 | 63 | |
| 10 | Brierley & Hagley | 42 | 17 | 11 | 14 | 74 | 73 | +1 | 62 | |
| 11 | Wellington | 42 | 16 | 10 | 16 | 59 | 69 | −10 | 58 | |
| 12 | Heath Hayes | 42 | 15 | 12 | 15 | 72 | 75 | −3 | 57 | |
| 13 | Wolverhampton Casuals | 42 | 17 | 5 | 20 | 71 | 91 | −20 | 56 | |
| 14 | Wolverhampton United | 42 | 15 | 8 | 19 | 66 | 73 | −7 | 53 | |
| 15 | Ettingshall Holy Trinity | 42 | 13 | 5 | 24 | 74 | 92 | −18 | 44 | |
| 16 | Smethwick Sikh Temple | 42 | 11 | 11 | 20 | 58 | 83 | −25 | 44 | |
| 17 | Sedgeley White Lions | 42 | 11 | 9 | 22 | 48 | 74 | −26 | 42 | |
| 18 | Bustleholme | 42 | 11 | 7 | 24 | 69 | 93 | −24 | 40 | |
| 19 | Bromyard Town | 42 | 11 | 2 | 29 | 61 | 125 | −64 | 35 | |
| 20 | Dudley Town | 42 | 7 | 9 | 26 | 46 | 112 | −66 | 30 | |
| 21 | Walsall Wood | 42 | 6 | 11 | 25 | 48 | 109 | −61 | 29 | Relegated to Division One North |
| 22 | Gornal Athletic | 42 | 7 | 7 | 28 | 41 | 106 | −65 | 28 | Relegated to Division One South |

Source: fchd
Rules for classification: 1) points; 2) goal difference; 3) number of goals scored.
