= 2008–09 FA Cup qualifying rounds =

Tournament details
- Country: England; Wales

The 2008–09 FA Cup qualifying rounds opened the 128th season of competition in England for 'The Football Association Challenge Cup' (FA Cup), the world's oldest association football single knockout competition. A new record 762 clubs were accepted for the competition, up 33 from the previous season's 729 – completing a significant increase of 75 teams (11%) from the 687 clubs just two seasons earlier. South Normanton Athletic folded before the fixtures were released, leaving 761 clubs to appear in the draw.

The large number of clubs entering the tournament from lower down (Levels 5 through 10) in the English football pyramid meant that the competition started with six rounds of preliminary (2) and qualifying (4) knockouts for these non-League teams. The 32 winning teams from fourth round qualifying progressed to the First round proper, where League teams tiered at Levels 3 and 4 entered the competition.

== Calendar ==
The calendar for the 2008–09 FA Cup qualifying rounds, as announced by The Football Association.

Round	Start date	Leagues entering at this round	New entries this round	Winners from previous round	Number of fixtures	Prize money
Extra preliminary round	16 August 2008	Levels 9-10	406	none	203	£750
Preliminary round	30 August 2008	Level 8	129	203	166	£1,500
First round qualifying	13 September 2008	Level 7	66	166	116	£3,000
Second round qualifying	27 September 2008	Conference North; Conference South	44	116	80	£4,500
Third round qualifying	11 October 2008	none	none	80	40	£7,500
Fourth round qualifying	25 October 2008	Conference Premier	24	40	32	£12,500

== Extra preliminary round ==
The draw for the extra preliminary round was announced on The FA's website on 1 July 2008. 406 clubs from Level 9 and Level 10 of English football, entered at this stage of the competition.

Tie	Home team (tier)	Score	Away team (tier)	Att.
1	Bedlington Terriers (9)	1–0	Chester-Le-Street Town (9)	125
2	Consett (9)	5–1	Pontefract Collieries (10)	128
3	South Shields (9)	5–1	Hebburn Town (10)	206
4	Horden Colliery Welfare (10)	1–3	Sunderland Nissan (9)	44
5	Northallerton Town (9)	1–3	Whitley Bay (9)	124
6	Glasshoughton Welfare (10)	2–2	Billingham Synthonia (9)	
replay	Billingham Synthonia (9)	5–1	Glasshoughton Welfare (10)	103
7	Crook Town (10)	6–1	North Shields (10)	95
8	Pickering Town (9)	4–1	Liversedge (9)	182
9	West Auckland Town (9)	2–1	Hall Road Rangers (9)	59
10	Jarrow Roofing Boldon CA (10)	2–1	Spennymoor Town (9)	79
11	Team Northumbria (10)	4–1	Esh Winning (10)	73
12	West Allotment Celtic (9)	2–1	Sunderland Ryhope CA (10)	70
13	Shildon (9)	3–0	Leeds Carnegie (10)	100
14	Armthorpe Welfare (9)	5–0	Yorkshire Amateur (10)	40
15	Marske United (10)	0–1	Whickham (10)	73
16	Billingham Town (9)	2–2	Brandon United (10)	90
replay	Brandon United (10)	1–2	Billingham Town (9)	70
17	Morpeth Town (9)	0–2	Ryton (9)	61
18	Washington (10)	0–0	Stokesley SC (10)	117
replay	Stokesley SC (10)	2–0	Washington (10)	148
19	Bishop Auckland (9)	3–2	Darlington Railway Athletic (10)	142
20	Seaham Red Star (9)	1–3	Selby Town (9)	75
21	Bridlington Town (9)	3–2	Guisborough Town (10)	135
22	Norton & Stockton Ancients (10)	0–1	Newcastle Benfield (9)	73
23	Silsden (9)	4–1	Eccleshill United (9)	173
24	Ashington (9)	1–0	Thackley (9)	151
25	Thornaby (10)	0–3	Tow Law Town (9)	70
26	Dunston Federation (9)	4–0	Tadcaster Albion (10)	162
27	Cheadle Town (10)	1–4	Newcastle Town (9)	72
28	Leek CSOB (10)	1–4	AFC Fylde (9)	68
29	Maltby Main (9)	3–4	Bottesford Town (10)	63
30	Dinnington Town (9)	1–2	Atherton Laburnum Rovers (9)	109
31	Parkgate (9)	1–2	Norton United (10)	43
32	Darwen (10)	4–7	Penrith (9)	84
33	Holker Old Boys (10)	2–2	St Helens Town (9)	56
replay	St Helens Town (9)	1–0	Holker Old Boys (10)	83
34	Formby (9)	3–1	AFC Emley (10)	91
35	Winsford United (9)	3–3	Nostell Miners Welfare (9)	130
replay	Nostell Miners Welfare (9)	3–0	Winsford United (9)	135
36	Bootle (10)	5–1	Eccleshall (10)	55
37	Abbey Hey (9)	1–1	Flixton (9)	55
replay	Flixton (9)	3–1 (a.e.t.)	Abbey Hey (9)	68
38	Barton Town Old Boys (10)	1–3	Winterton Rangers (9)	132
39	Maine Road (9)	2–1	Chadderton (10)	76
40	Brodsworth Welfare (9)	2–1	Ashton Town (10)	28
41	Oldham Town (10)	2–0	Ashton Athletic (9)	44
42	Congleton Town (9)	2–2	AFC Blackpool (10)	92
replay	AFC Blackpool (10)	1–4	Congleton Town (9)	54
43	Ramsbottom United (9)	2–0	Hallam (9)	135
44	Alsager Town (9)	0–1	Padiham (10)	54
45	Runcorn Linnets (9)	3–2	Rossington Main (10)	170
46	Colne (9)	4–1	Daisy Hill (10)	55
47	Atherton Collieries (9)	1–2	Bacup Borough (9)	42
48	Squires Gate (9)	3–1	Biddulph Victoria (9)	55
49	AFC Wulfrunians (10)	1–1	Pilkington XXX (10)	65
replay	Pilkington XXX (10)	2–1	AFC Wulfrunians (10)	68
50	Arnold Town (9)	1–2	Long Eaton United (9)	117
51	Tipton Town (9)	2–0	Teversal (10)	39
52	Highgate United (9)	w/o	Brierley Hill & Withymoor	
Walkover for Highgate United – Brierley Hill & Withymoor folded
53	Racing Club Warwick (9)	6–2	Cadbury Athletic (10)	78
54	Westfields (9)	7–1	Gedling Miners Welfare (10)	44
55	Stratford Town (9)	2–0	Pershore Town (10)	164
56	Shirebrook Town (9)	3–2	Causeway United (9)	97
57	Gedling Town (10)	w/o	Stapenhill	
Walkover for Gedling Town – Stapenhill folded
58	New Mills (9)	1–2	Friar Lane & Epworth (9)	184
59	Borrowash Victoria (10)	2–4	Market Drayton Town (9)	52
60	Coventry Sphinx (9)	1–2	Barwell (9)	124
61	Tividale (10)	1–3	Coleshill Town (9)	54
62	Wellington (10)	1–4	Mickleover Sports (9)	46
63	Dunkirk (10)	1–4	Alvechurch (9)	93
64	Heather St Johns (10)	0–3	Cradley Town (9)	86
65	Ledbury Town (10)	2–3	Bromyard Town (10)	84
66	Staveley Miners Welfare (10)	3–1	Bridgnorth Town (9)	81
67	Goodrich (10)	1–1	Meir KA (10)	44
replay	Meir KA (10)	4–4 (5–4 p)	Goodrich (10)	76
68	Pegasus Juniors (9)	1–4	Glossop North End (9)	41
69	Rocester (9)	0–1	Nuneaton Griff (10)	96
70	Southam United (10)	3–1	Boldmere St Michaels (9)	102
71	Hinckley Downes (10)	4–2	Shawbury United (10)	98
72	Heath Hayes (10)	1–3	Shifnal Town (9)	120
73	Oadby Town (9)	0–3	Oldbury United (9)	70
74	Ellesmere Rangers (10)	4–0	Dudley Sports (10)	
75	Dudley Town (10)	1–2	Rainworth Miners Welfare (10)	75
76	Brocton (10)	1–1	Lye Town (10)	98
replay	Lye Town (10)	5–1	Brocton (10)	252
77	Gornal Athletic (10)	3–1	Pelsall Villa (10)	26
78	G.S.A. Sports (10)	1–3	Coalville Town (9)	30
79	Stone Dominoes (10)	3–2	Walsall Wood (10)	37
80	Bolehall Swifts (10)	1–3	Studley	52
81	Castle Vale (10)	0–2	Barrow Town (10)	152
82	Yaxley (9)	4–3	Lincoln Moorlands Railway (9)	62
83	Sleaford Town (9)	3–2	Ely City (9)	320
84	Haverhill Rovers (9)	2–2	March Town United (10)	81
replay	March Town United (10)	2–0	Haverhill Rovers (9)	105
85	Stowmarket Town (10)	2–2	Ipswich Wanderers (10)	87
replay	Ipswich Wanderers (10)	2–0	Stowmarket Town (10)	116
86	St Neots Town (9)	7–1	Holbeach United (9)	190
87	Mildenhall Town (9)	8–0	Felixstowe & Walton United (9)	166
88	Gorleston (10)	3–5	Fakenham Town (10)	92
89	Woodbridge Town (9)	1–0	Newmarket Town (10)	93
90	Diss Town (10)	1–2	Walsham-le-Willows (9)	162
91	Hadleigh United (10)	0–1	Great Yarmouth Town (10)	118
92	Whitton United (9)	1–1	Cornard United (10)	47
replay	Cornard United (10)	3–3 (4–2 p)	Whitton United (9)	33
93	Leiston (9)	2–1	Blackstones (9)	124
94	Long Melford (10)	2–5	Boston Town (9)	95
95	Thetford Town (10)	0–1	Needham Market (9)	206
96	Debenham LC (10)	0–1	Dereham Town (9)	91
97	Lowestoft Town (9)	2–1	St Ives Town (9)	433
98	Wisbech Town (9)	1–1	Norwich United (9)	170
replay	Norwich United (9)	1–3	Wisbech Town (9)	114
99	Deeping Rangers (9)	3–0	Bourne Town (9)	129
100	Wroxham (9)	1–0	Kirkley & Pakefield (9)	194
101	Raunds Town (9)	2–2	Harwich & Parkeston (9)	94
replay	Harwich & Parkeston (9)	0–3	Raunds Town (9)	131
102	FC Clacton (10)	2–0	St Margaretsbury (9)	151
103	Rothwell Corinthians (9)	2–3	Langford (9)	47
104	Erith Town (9)	7–1	Potton United (9)	25

Tie	Home team (tier)	Score	Away team (tier)	Att.
105	Clapton (9)	0–3	Stewarts & Lloyds Corby (9)	
106	Cockfosters (9)	0–1	Ampthill Town (10)	94
107	Tring Athletic (9)	5–3	Berkhamsted Town (9)	163
108	Desborough Town (9)	4–4	Saffron Walden Town (10)	92
replay	Saffron Walden Town (10)	2–1	Desborough Town (9)	166
109	Southend Manor (9)	2–1	AFC Kempston Rovers (10)	40
110	North Greenford United (9)	0–1	Tiptree United (9)	64
111	Kentish Town (9)	1–1	Wellingborough Town (9)	179
replay	Wellingborough Town (9)	2–0	Kentish Town (9)	112
112	Tokyngton Manor (10)	2–3	Biggleswade United (9)	24
113	Cogenhoe United (9)	0–1	Northampton Spencer (9)	144
114	Stotfold (9)	3–1	Colney Heath (9)	73
115	Kingsbury London Tigers (9)	1–0	Eton Manor (9)	108
116	Long Buckby (9)	0–2	Broxbourne Borough V&E (9)	50
117	Hanwell Town (9)	3–2	Wootton Blue Cross (10)	39
118	London Colney (10)	1–1	Sporting Bengal United (9)	74
replay	Sporting Bengal United (9)	1–0	London Colney (10)	98
119	Stanway Rovers (9)	4–0	Welwyn Garden City (9)	94
120	Halstead Town (10)	4–1	London APSA (9)	133
121	Haringey Borough (9)	1–3	Bedfont (9)	39
122	Wivenhoe Town (9)	1–4	Barkingside (9)	72
123	Hullbridge Sports (9)	2–1	Leverstock Green (9)	50
124	Oxhey Jets (9)	5–0	Hertford Town (9)	58
125	Hoddesdon Town (10)	2–3	Stansted (9)	45
126	Wembley (9)	1–1	Royston Town (10)	99
replay	Royston Town (10)	4–0	Wembley (9)	201
127	Bedfont Green (9)	4–0	Barking (9)	55
128	Brimsdown Rovers (9)	0–2	Hatfield Town (10)	223
129	Bowers & Pitsea (9)	1–2	Harefield United (9)	70
130	Romford (9)	3–0	Biggleswade Town (9)	146
131	Daventry United (10)	0–0	Burnham Ramblers (9)	47
replay	Burnham Ramblers (9)	5–3	Daventry United (10)	84
132	Selsey (9)	1–0	Egham Town (9)	139
133	Three Bridges (9)	2–3	VCD Athletic (9)	66
134	Mile Oak (10)	3–0	Bookham (9)	77
135	Hailsham Town (9)	1–0	Worthing United (9)	79
136	Ash United (9)	0–4	Sevenoaks Town (9)	48
137	Westfield (Surrey) (10)	0–3	East Preston (9)	61
138	Banstead Athletic (9)	0–2	Colliers Wood United (9)	35
139	Hassocks (9)	0–1	Shoreham (9)	72
140	Slade Green (9)	1–1	Tunbridge Wells (9)	
replay	Tunbridge Wells (9)	2–1	Slade Green (9)	112
141	Ringmer (9)	4–3 (a.e.t.)	Rye United (10)	73
142	Pagham (9)	1–5	Hythe Town (9)	120
143	Dorking (10)	2–1	Chessington & Hook United (9)	54
144	Littlehampton Town (10)	2–5	Peacehaven & Telscombe (10)	58
145	Whitehawk (9)	0–0	Croydon (9)	73
replay	Croydon (9)	4–3	Whitehawk (9)	63
146	Eastbourne United (9)	2–4	Epsom & Ewell (9)	90
147	Crawley Down (10)	2–2	Chichester City United (9)	56
replay	Chichester City United (9)	3–1	Crawley Down (10)	72
148	Cobham (9)	1–1	Southwick (10)	53
replay	Southwick (10)	1–3	Cobham (9)	77
149	Erith & Belvedere (9)	4–2	Lancing (10)	105
150	Wick (9)	0–3	Molesey (9)	82
151	Wealden (10)	3–4	East Grinstead Town (9)	48
152	Frimley Green (10)	1–0	Guildford City (9)	54
153	Faversham Town (9)	0–2	Horsham YMCA (9)	268
154	Redhill (9)	1–2	Herne Bay (9)	87
155	Camberley Town (9)	1–1	Lordswood (9)	71
replay	Lordswood (9)	2–4	Camberley Town (9)	52
156	Sidley United (10)	4–2	Farnham Town (10)	98
157	Chertsey Town (9)	2–2	Deal Town (9)	113
replay	Deal Town (9)	1–2	Chertsey Town (9)	104
158	Lingfield (9)	0–3	Arundel (9)	93
159	Horley Town (9)	2–2	Raynes Park Vale (9)	80
replay	Raynes Park Vale (9)	3–1	Horley Town (9)	72
160	Bournemouth (9)	2–1	Fareham Town (9)	79
161	New Milton Town (9)	5–0	Amesbury Town (10)	91
162	Westbury United (10)	0–0	Hamble ASSC (9)	59
replay	Hamble ASSC (9)	2–2 (2–4 p)	Westbury United (10)	62
163	Brockenhurst (9)	2–1	Reading Town (9)	122
164	Aylesbury Vale (9)	4–2 (a.e.t.)	Highworth Town (9)	66
165	Kidlington (9)	4–1	Sandhurst Town (9)	58
166	Christchurch (9)	2–1	Melksham Town (9)	66
167	Witney United (9)	2–0	Buckingham Town (10)	133
168	Milton United (9)	1–2	Lymington Town (9)	42
169	Hartley Wintney (9)	3–1	Cove (9)	88
170	VT (9)	0–2	Newport Pagnell Town (9)	32
171	Hungerford Town (9)	0–0	Marlow United (9)	59
replay	Marlow United (9)	2–2 (4–2 p)	Hungerford Town (9)	59
172	Devizes Town (9)	2–2	Calne Town (9)	63
replay	Calne Town (9)	3–0	Devizes Town (9)	76
173	Downton (10)	2–0	Abingdon Town (9)	54
174	Chalfont St Peter (9)	4–3	Ardley United (9)	56
175	Bicester Town (9)	1–0	Bristol Manor Farm (9)	39
176	Thame United (10)	0–0	Bitton (9)	42
replay	Bitton (9)	3–0	Thame United (10)	82
177	Bemerton Heath Harlequins (9)	1–4	Almondsbury Town (9)	58
178	Corsham Town (9)	0–2	Moneyfields (9)	102
179	Shortwood United (9)	5–0	Henley Town (10)	56
180	Harrow Hill (9)	4–1	Alresford Town (9)	40
181	Cowes Sports (9)	4–3	Alton Town (9)	88
182	Ringwood Town (10)	1–0	Hallen (9)	48
183	Carterton (9)	2–1	Newport (Isle of Wight) (9)	60
184	Flackwell Heath (9)	1–1	Wootton Bassett Town (10)	63
replay	Wootton Bassett Town (10)	1–6	Flackwell Heath (9)	97
185	Wantage Town (9)	1–3	Brading Town (9)	355
186	Fairford Town (9)	4–1	Shrivenham (9)	56
187	Chard Town (9)	2–2	Street (9)	41
replay	Street (9)	5–1	Chard Town (9)	123
188	Elmore (10)	0–4	Bodmin Town (10)	42
189	Willand Rovers (9)	6–0	Wadebridge Town (10)	65
190	Welton Rovers (9)	0–1	Poole Town (9)	107
191	Launceston (10)	3–0	Sherborne Town (9)	146
192	Liskeard Athletic (10)	0–5	Larkhall Athletic (10)	38
193	Ilfracombe Town (9)	1–4	Tavistock (10)	81
194	Bideford (9)	4–2	Keynsham Town (10)	180
195	Shaftesbury (10)	2–2	Falmouth Town (10)	77
replay	Falmouth Town (10)	4–2	Shaftesbury (10)	66
196	Odd Down (10)	2–1	Bishop Sutton (9)	48
197	Gillingham Town (10)	2–2	Saltash United (10)	243
replay	Saltash United (10)	2–4	Gillingham Town (10)	116
198	Radstock Town (9)	1–2	Brislington (9)	51
199	Bridport (10)	2–1	Barnstaple Town (9)	107
200	Dawlish Town (9)	0–0	Wimborne Town (9)	114
replay	Wimborne Town (9)	3–2	Dawlish Town (9)	273
201	Minehead Town (10)	0–3	Clevedon United (10)	40
202	St Blazey (10)	0–2	Hamworthy United (9)	85
203	Frome Town (9)	3–1	Shepton Mallet (10)	169

== Preliminary round ==
Matches in the preliminary round were played on the weekend of 30 August 2008, with replays played on 2 September and 3 September 2008. The draw for the round was announced on The FA's website on 1 July 2008. A total of 332 clubs took part in this stage of the competition, including the 203 winners from the extra preliminary round and 129 entering at this stage from the six leagues at Level 8 of English football. The round featured 52 clubs from Level 10 still in the competition, the lowest-ranked clubs in this round.

Tie	Home team (tier)	Score	Away team (tier)	Att.
1	Ashington (9)	2–1	Ossett Albion (8)	345
2	Team Northumbria (10)	0–3	Bedlington Terriers (9)	83
3	Armthorpe Welfare (9)	1–1	Crook Town (10)	40
replay	Crook Town (10)	3–0	Armthorpe Welfare (9)	146
4	Wakefield (8)	2–0	Stokesley SC (10)	72
5	South Shields (9)	0–4	Selby Town (9)	201
6	Sunderland Nissan (9)	1–2	Newcastle Blue Star (8)	88
7	West Allotment Celtic (9)	1–3	Shildon (9)	100
8	West Auckland Town (9)	0–5	Durham City (8)	146
9	Bishop Auckland (9)	3–3	Consett (9)	185
replay	Consett (9)	4–1	Bishop Auckland (9)	173
10	Goole (8)	0–4	Newcastle Benfield (9)	181
11	Billingham Town (9)	0–4	Whitley Bay (9)	178
12	FC Halifax Town (8)	0–0	Silsden (9)	833
replay	Silsden (9)	1–3	FC Halifax Town (8)	442
13	Whickham (10)	0–2	Pickering Town (9)	135
14	Jarrow Roofing Boldon CA (10)	2–2	Bridlington Town (9)	65
replay	Bridlington Town (9)	2–1	Jarrow Roofing Boldon CA (10)	122
15	Garforth Town (8)	1–0	Tow Law Town (9)	1274
16	Billingham Synthonia (9)	0–2	Ryton (9)	96
17	Dunston Federation (9)	1–0	Harrogate Railway Athletic (8)	172
18	Newcastle Town (9)	0–1	Skelmersdale United (8)	117
19	Oldham Town (10)	1–1	Rossendale United (8)	75
replay	Rossendale United (8)	3–0	Oldham Town (10)	126
20	Bootle (10)	1–0	Padiham (10)	80
21	Trafford (8)	2–4	Stocksbridge Park Steels (8)	147
22	Congleton Town (9)	1–1	Squires Gate (9)	136
replay	Squires Gate (9)	0–3	Congleton Town (9)	69
23	Penrith (9)	1–3	Clitheroe (8)	153
24	Bottesford Town (10)	2–2	Flixton (9)	72
replay	Flixton (9)	7–5	Bottesford Town (10)	68
25	Lancaster City (8)	1–2	Salford City (8)	160
26	Norton United (10)	1–3	Leek Town (8)	235
27	Mossley (8)	3–1	Ramsbottom United (9)	202
28	Formby (9)	0–5	Colne (9)	59
29	Brigg Town (8)	2–2	Maine Road (9)	92
replay	Maine Road (9)	1–2	Brigg Town (8)	90
30	Radcliffe Borough (8)	1–2	Winterton Rangers (9)	137
31	Warrington Town (8)	0–0	Nostell Miners Welfare (9)	132
replay	Nostell Miners Welfare (9)	1–2	Warrington Town (8)	160
32	Bacup Borough (9)	3–1	St Helens Town (9)	58
33	Chorley (8)	0–1	Atherton Laburnum Rovers (9)	208
34	AFC Fylde (9)	1–1	Sheffield (8)	291
replay	Sheffield (8)	4–0	AFC Fylde (9)	285
35	Woodley Sports (8)	0–0	Brodsworth Welfare (9)	52
replay	Brodsworth Welfare (9)	0–2	Woodley Sports (8)	66
36	Curzon Ashton (8)	4–0	Runcorn Linnets (9)	138
37	Bamber Bridge (8)	4–3	Colwyn Bay (8)	151
38	Hinckley Downes (10)	0–4	Gornal Athletic (10)	102
39	Atherstone Town (8)	1–0	Quorn (8)	198
40	Malvern Town (8)	1–3	Coalville Town (9)	92
41	Oldbury United (9)	0–1	Friar Lane & Epworth (9)	67
42	Long Eaton United (9)	1–0	Rushall Olympic (8)	72
43	Glapwell (8)	2–1	Market Drayton Town (9)	104
44	Ellesmere Rangers (10)	2–1	Bromsgrove Rovers (8)	179
45	Loughborough Dynamo (8)	0–1	Tipton Town (9)	125
46	Shirebrook Town (9)	1–3	Studley (9)	93
47	Stone Dominoes (10)	1–2	Rainworth Miners Welfare (10)	53
48	Nuneaton Town (8)	1–0	Gedling Town (10)	549
49	Westfields (9)	2–4	Stratford Town (9)	77
50	Chasetown (8)	5–0	Carlton Town (8)	452
51	Kidsgrove Athletic (8)	3–0	Pilkington XXX (10)	106
52	Highgate United (9)	1–4	Romulus (8)	90
53	Sutton Coldfield Town (8)	2–3	Cradley Town (9)	92
54	Gresley Rovers (8)	4–1	Alvechurch (9)	247
55	Shepshed Dynamo (8)	3–2	Mickleover Sports (9)	167
56	Retford United (8)	3–1	Barrow Town (10)	205
57	Glossop North End (9)	1–2	Belper Town (8)	247
58	Meir KA (10)	1–0	Nuneaton Griff (10)	77
59	Lye Town (10)	1–2	Southam United (10)	133
60	Leamington (8)	4–0	Staveley Miners Welfare (10)	575
61	Willenhall Town (8)	0–0	Bedworth United (8)	106
replay	Bedworth United (8)	2–3 (a.e.t.)	Willenhall Town (8)	130
62	Racing Club Warwick (9)	0–2	Stourport Swifts (8)	86
63	Coleshill Town (9)	2–3	Shifnal Town (9)	91
64	Bromyard Town (10)	1–5	Barwell (9)	57
65	Spalding United (8)	2–3	Yaxley (9)	153
66	Soham Town Rangers (8)	0–2	Needham Market (9)	167
67	Leiston (9)	3–1	March Town United (10)	170
68	Wisbech Town (9)	2–2	Mildenhall Town (9)	208
replay	Mildenhall Town (9)	4–0	Wisbech Town (9)	213
69	Fakenham Town (10)	0–4	Boston Town (9)	76
70	Grantham Town (8)	4–1	Woodbridge Town (9)	187
71	Walsham-le-Willows (9)	1–2	Sleaford Town (9)	112
72	Dereham Town (9)	2–2	Stamford (8)	166
replay	Stamford (8)	1–0	Dereham Town (9)	166
73	AFC Sudbury (8)	1–1	Lowestoft Town (9)	309
replay	Lowestoft Town (9)	2–2 (4–1 p)	AFC Sudbury (8)	598
74	Ipswich Wanderers (10)	1–1	Cornard United (10)	69
replay	Cornard United (10)	3–0	Ipswich Wanderers (10)	40
75	Great Yarmouth Town (10)	2–2	Wroxham (9)	190
replay	Wroxham (9)	3–0	Great Yarmouth Town (10)	205
76	St Neots Town (9)	2–3	Lincoln United (8)	250
77	Deeping Rangers (9)	1–2	Bury Town (8)	137
78	Brentwood Town (8)	2–1	Erith Town (9)	108
79	Dulwich Hamlet (8)	1–1	Broxbourne Borough V&E (9)	164
replay	Broxbourne Borough V&E (9)	1–2	Dulwich Hamlet (8)	96
80	Great Wakering Rovers (8)	4–0	Bedfont Green (9)	78
81	Langford (9)	0–1	Arlesey Town (8)	161
82	Oxhey Jets (9)	5–2	Ilford (8)	93

Tie	Home team (tier)	Score	Away team (tier)	Att.
83	Northwood (8)	0–2	Metropolitan Police (8)	131
84	Northampton Spencer (9)	2–2	Wingate & Finchley (8)	101
replay	Wingate & Finchley (8)	4–0	Northampton Spencer (9)	84
85	Bedfont (9)	2–4	Tiptree United (9)	83
86	Barton Rovers (8)	2–1	Burnham Ramblers (9)	67
87	Leyton (8)	2–1	Romford (9)	106
88	Ampthill Town (10)	0–4	Dunstable Town (8)	140
89	Halstead Town (10)	1–2	Stotfold (9)	103
90	East Thurrock United (8)	4–2	Hatfield Town (10)	139
91	FC Clacton (10)	4–0	Stansted (9)	138
92	Barkingside (9)	0–4	Stanway Rovers (9)	100
93	Cheshunt (8)	2–1	Southend Manor (9)	192
94	Tilbury (8)	0–2	Leighton Town (8)	57
95	Stewarts & Lloyds Corby (9)	3–2	Corinthian Casuals (8)	74
96	Hanwell Town (9)	0–5	Aveley (8)	71
97	Witham Town (8)	3–3	Maldon Town (8)	185
replay	Maldon Town (8)	1–4	Witham Town (8)	121
98	Waltham Forest (8)	0–1	Thamesmead Town (8)	38
99	Harefield United (9)	1–1	Saffron Walden Town (10)	130
replay	Saffron Walden Town (10)	2–0	Harefield United (9)	209
100	Ware (8)	4–0	Sporting Bengal United (9)	178
101	Concord Rangers (8)	2–0	Kingsbury London Tigers (9)	128
102	Rothwell Town (8)	2–0	Hullbridge Sports (9)	83
103	Hillingdon Borough (8)	3–1	Enfield Town (8)	108
104	Redbridge (8)	1–3	Uxbridge (8)	91
105	Croydon Athletic (8)	3–1	Wellingborough Town (9)	126
106	Tring Athletic (9)	1–2	Biggleswade United (9)	87
107	AFC Hayes (8)	1–3	Royston Town (10)	83
108	Woodford United (8)	1–1	Raunds Town (9)	74
replay	Raunds Town (9)	0–0 (4–3 p)	Woodford United (8)	129
109	Potters Bar Town (8)	1–1	Waltham Abbey (8)	84
replay	Waltham Abbey (8)	1–0	Potters Bar Town (8)	131
110	Walton Casuals (8)	2–0	Molesey (9)	106
111	Mile Oak (10)	0–2	Arundel (9)	93
112	Horsham YMCA (9)	3–1	Tunbridge Wells (9)	103
113	Sevenoaks Town (9)	4–4	Folkestone Invicta (8)	140
replay	Folkestone Invicta (8)	4–1	Sevenoaks Town (9)	194
114	Ashford Town (Kent) (8)	3–2	Leatherhead (8)	293
115	Herne Bay (9)	2–2	Chipstead (8)	210
replay	Chipstead (8)	2–0 (a.e.t.)	Herne Bay (9)	110
116	Epsom & Ewell (9)	2–1	Frimley Green (10)	70
117	Whitstable Town (8)	1–0	Selsey (9)	153
118	Camberley Town (9)	0–6	Worthing (8)	131
119	Hythe Town (9)	2–1	Walton & Hersham (8)	209
120	Crowborough Athletic (8)	3–1	Ringmer (9)	108
121	East Preston (9)	1–2	Erith & Belvedere (9)	71
122	Sittingbourne (8)	2–1	Chertsey Town (9)	168
123	Burgess Hill Town (8)	2–0	Hailsham Town (9)	159
124	Cobham (9)	0–2	Merstham (8)	68
125	Shoreham (9)	1–3	Kingstonian (8)	281
126	Chatham Town (8)	2–2	Dorking (10)	119
replay	Dorking (10)	0–1	Chatham Town (8)	88
127	East Grinstead Town (9)	0–3	Colliers Wood United (9)	122
128	Raynes Park Vale (9)	1–2	Godalming Town (8)	114
129	Whyteleafe (8)	0–0	Peacehaven & Telscombe (10)	96
replay	Peacehaven & Telscombe (10)	1–3	Whyteleafe (8)	102
130	VCD Athletic (9)	3–1	Croydon (9)	101
131	Sidley United (10)	1–2	Eastbourne Town (8)	180
132	Cray Wanderers (8)	4–1	Chichester City United (9)	134
133	AFC Totton (8)	2–1	Moneyfields (9)	254
134	Westbury United (10)	0–6	Fairford Town (9)	78
135	Cowes Sports (9)	4–0	Lymington Town (9)	102
136	Aylesbury Vale (9)	1–1	Burnham (8)	74
replay	Burnham (8)	1–2	Aylesbury Vale (9)	112
137	Aylesbury United (8)	2–0	Windsor & Eton (8)	214
138	Ringwood Town (10)	2–2	Marlow (8)	81
replay	Marlow (8)	4–0	Ringwood Town (10)	92
139	Chalfont St Peter (9)	2–1	Harrow Hill (9)	65
140	Didcot Town (8)	5–0	Bournemouth (9)	208
141	Carterton (9)	0–1	North Leigh (8)	79
142	Newport Pagnell Town (9)	1–0	Cirencester Town (8)	117
143	Gosport Borough (8)	5–0	Hartley Wintney (9)	148
144	Kidlington (9)	2–3	Almondsbury Town (9)	64
145	Chesham United (8)	5–1	Brading Town (9)	332
146	Fleet Town (8)	1–1	Brockenhurst (9)	128
replay	Brockenhurst (9)	0–1	Fleet Town (8)	130
147	Bitton (9)	2–1	Bishop's Cleeve (8)	88
148	Witney United (9)	2–2	Thatcham Town (8)	90
replay	Thatcham Town (8)	3–1 (a.e.t.)	Witney United (9)	134
149	Beaconsfield SYCOB (8)	1–0	Marlow United (9)	114
150	Shortwood United (9)	2–0	Christchurch (9)	75
151	Abingdon United (8)	1–1	Slough Town (8)	156
replay	Slough Town (8)	5–2	Abingdon United (8)	211
152	Andover (8)	1–3	Calne Town (9)	134
153	New Milton Town (9)	1–2	Downton (10)	59
154	Flackwell Heath (9)	3–4	Winchester City (8)	72
155	Bracknell Town (8)	3–0	Bicester Town (9)	103
156	Bodmin Town (10)	0–3	Bridgwater Town (8)	149
157	Launceston (10)	0–2	Paulton Rovers (8)	200
158	Clevedon United (10)	0–3	Taunton Town (8)	119
159	Odd Down (10)	0–2	Wimborne Town (9)	71
160	Street (9)	3–3	Bideford (9)	146
replay	Bideford (9)	2–1	Street (9)	155
161	Cinderford Town (8)	0–1	Frome Town (9)	109
162	Falmouth Town (10)	0–4	Truro City (8)	487
163	Poole Town (9)	2–1	Willand Rovers (9)	229
164	Hamworthy United (9)	3–2	Brislington (9)	80
165	Larkhall Athletic (10)	6–2	Tavistock (10)	130
166	Bridport (10)	3–0	Gillingham Town (10)	287

== First round qualifying ==
Matches in the first round qualifying were played on the weekend of 13 September 2008. Replays were played on 16 and 17 September 2008. The draw for the round was announced on The FA's website on 1 July 2008. A total of 232 clubs took part in this stage of the competition, including the 166 winners from the preliminary round and 66 entering at this stage from the top division of the three leagues at Level 7 of English football. The round featured 14 clubs from Level 10 still in the competition, the lowest-ranked clubs in this round.

Tie	Home team (tier)	Score	Away team (tier)	Att.
1	Bedlington Terriers (9)	0–1	Bradford Park Avenue (7)	161
2	Selby Town (9)	2–4	Guiseley (7)	217
3	Garforth Town (8)	1–0	Ossett Town (7)	151
4	Newcastle Benfield (9)	1–1	Bridlington Town (9)	53
replay	Bridlington Town (9)	1–2	Newcastle Benfield (9)	172
5	Ashington (9)	0–6	Durham City (8)	284
6	Whitby Town (7)	3–2	Dunston Federation (9)	244
7	Consett (9)	4–4	North Ferriby United (7)	175
replay	North Ferriby United (7)	6–1	Consett (9)	135
8	Wakefield (8)	4–3	Crook Town (10)	127
9	Ryton (9)	0–4	FC Halifax Town (8)	384
10	Newcastle Blue Star (8)	2–0	Shildon (9)	187
11	Pickering Town (9)	0–1	Whitley Bay (9)	209
12	Congleton Town (9)	0–2	Prescot Cables (7)	169
13	Sheffield (8)	3–2	Colne (9)	242
14	Woodley Sports (8)	1–3	Rossendale United (8)	66
15	Bacup Borough (9)	3–0	Cammell Laird (7)	131
16	Brigg Town (8)	1–4	Stocksbridge Park Steels (8)	87
17	Clitheroe (8)	1–1	Leek Town (8)	258
replay	Leek Town (8)	0–1	Clitheroe (8)	224
18	Buxton (7)	3–1	Bootle (10)	412
19	Frickley Athletic (7)	1–0	Skelmersdale United (8)	240
20	Nantwich Town (7)	0–0	FC United of Manchester (7)	1,784
replay	FC United of Manchester (7)	3–4	Nantwich Town (7)	1,012
21	Flixton (9)	1–4	Mossley (8)	123
22	Bamber Bridge (8)	1–2	Witton Albion (7)	214
23	Salford City (8)	5–0	Atherton Laburnum Rovers (9)	118
24	Curzon Ashton (8)	1–0	Leigh Genesis (7)	158
25	Winterton Rangers (9)	4–2	Warrington Town (8)	100
26	Ashton United (7)	0–6	Kendal Town (7)	118
27	Marine (7)	1–5	Worksop Town (7)	205
28	Hednesford Town (7)	1–2	Atherstone Town (8)	416
29	Shepshed Dynamo (8)	7–0	Stourport Swifts (8)	156
30	Friar Lane & Epworth (9)	0–0	Rugby Town (7)	210
replay	Rugby Town (7)	5–3	Friar Lane & Epworth (9)	176
31	Cradley Town (9)	2–2	Ellesmere Rangers (10)	77
replay	Ellesmere Rangers (10)	1–3	Cradley Town (9)	274
32	Stourbridge (7)	0–0	Rainworth Miners Welfare (10)	183
replay	Rainworth Miners Welfare (10)	1–3	Stourbridge (7)	155
33	Gresley Rovers (8)	2–4	Chasetown (8)	438
34	Meir KA (10)	1–1	Halesowen Town (7)	214
replay	Halesowen Town (7)	8–1	Meir KA (10)	308
35	Shifnal Town (9)	0–1	Long Eaton United (9)	84
36	Gornal Athletic (10)	0–0	Southam United (10)	93
replay	Southam United (10)	2–1	Gornal Athletic (10)	153
37	Retford United (8)	1–1	Willenhall Town (8)	220
replay	Willenhall Town (8)	1–3	Retford United (8)	95
38	Ilkeston Town (7)	4–1	Matlock Town (7)	495
39	Coalville Town (9)	2–1	Studley (9)	128
40	Romulus (8)	2–1	Stratford Town (9)	100
41	Eastwood Town (7)	4–0	Kidsgrove Athletic (8)	230
42	Leamington (8)	0–3	Evesham United (7)	712
43	Belper Town (8)	3–2	Barwell (9)	120
44	Boston United (7)	6–1	Glapwell (8)	857
45	Nuneaton Town (8)	3–1	Tipton Town (9)	531
46	Cambridge City (7)	2–0	Lowestoft Town (9)	391
47	Cornard United (10)	0–5	Leiston (9)	50
48	Grantham Town (8)	3–4	Wroxham (9)	185
49	Lincoln United (8)	3–2	Mildenhall Town (9)	147
50	Bury Town (8)	3–1	Boston Town (9)	200
51	Sleaford Town (9)	2–6	Stamford (8)	349
52	Needham Market (9)	2–2	Yaxley (9)	150
replay	Yaxley (9)	0–3	Needham Market (9)	128
53	Boreham Wood (7)	3–0	Biggleswade United (9)	75
54	Hillingdon Borough (8)	0–6	East Thurrock United (8)	80
55	Royston Town (10)	2–4	Hendon (7)	303
56	Ware (8)	1–1	Barton Rovers (8)	188
replay	Barton Rovers (8)	1–2	Ware (8)	112
57	Stewarts & Lloyds Corby (9)	5–1	Croydon Athletic (8)	65

Tie	Home team (tier)	Score	Away team (tier)	Att.
58	Tiptree United (9)	1–3	Stanway Rovers (9)	128
59	Billericay Town (7)	4–1	FC Clacton (10)	337
60	Oxhey Jets (9)	1–5	Dulwich Hamlet (8)	148
61	Hemel Hempstead Town (7)	1–1	Harrow Borough (7)	199
replay	Harrow Borough (7)	1–2	Hemel Hempstead Town (7)	121
62	Thamesmead Town (8)	2–1	Great Wakering Rovers (8)	78
63	Metropolitan Police (8)	0–3	Corby Town (7)	140
64	Wingate & Finchley (8)	2–0	Witham Town (8)	115
65	Stotfold (9)	0–3	Leighton Town (8)	101
66	Hitchin Town (7)	5–0	Concord Rangers (8)	225
67	Leyton (8)	2–4	Brackley Town (7)	80
68	Canvey Island (7)	1–5	Dunstable Town (8)	312
69	Raunds Town (9)	0–3	Ashford Town (Middx) (7)	154
70	Heybridge Swifts (7)	1–1	Uxbridge (8)	145
replay	Uxbridge (8)	1–3	Heybridge Swifts (7)	105
71	Cheshunt (8)	0–3	Staines Town (7)	236
72	Saffron Walden Town (10)	0–2	AFC Hornchurch (7)	337
73	Harlow Town (7)	5–1	Aveley (8)	245
74	Brentwood Town (8)	1–1	Arlesey Town (8)	145
replay	Arlesey Town (8)	1–0	Brentwood Town (8)	110
75	Waltham Abbey (8)	0–1	Rothwell Town (8)	143
76	Wealdstone (7)	2–2	Bedford Town (7)	312
replay	Bedford Town (7)	1–1 (4–2 p)	Wealdstone (7)	349
77	Dartford (7)	3–2	Hastings United (7)	830
78	Crowborough Athletic (8)	1–0	Walton Casuals (8)	145
79	Burgess Hill Town (8)	5–2	Epsom & Ewell (9)	156
80	Horsham (7)	1–0	Colliers Wood United (9)	258
81	Horsham YMCA (9)	1–1	Whyteleafe (8)	114
replay	Whyteleafe (8)	2–0	Horsham YMCA (9)	82
82	Folkestone Invicta (8)	1–0	Ramsgate (7)	305
83	Erith & Belvedere (9)	2–0	Sittingbourne (8)	133
84	Worthing (8)	5–1	Margate (7)	338
85	Godalming Town (8)	1–1	Arundel (9)	140
replay	Arundel (9)	1–2	Godalming Town (8)	123
86	Carshalton Athletic (7)	4–1	Eastbourne Town (8)	247
87	Kingstonian (8)	3–0	Ashford Town (Kent) (8)	401
88	Sutton United (7)	3–1	Cray Wanderers (8)	325
89	Merstham (8)	2–1	Whitstable Town (8)	130
90	Hythe Town (9)	0–0	VCD Athletic (9)	143
replay	VCD Athletic (9)	3–0	Hythe Town (9)	153
91	Tonbridge Angels (7)	1–2	Dover Athletic (7)	795
92	Chipstead (8)	1–0	Chatham Town (8)	85
93	Maidstone United (7)	2–1	Tooting & Mitcham United (7)	355
94	Bracknell Town (8)	2–0	Oxford City (7)	111
Walkover for Oxford City - Bracknell Town removed for fielding ineligible player
95	Aylesbury Vale (9)	2–0	Downton (10)	70
96	Shortwood United (9)	3–2	Didcot Town (8)	124
97	Farnborough (7)	1–0	Slough Town (8)	571
98	Fleet Town (8)	3–0	Cowes Sports (9)	141
99	Newport Pagnell Town (9)	2–1	Marlow (8)	148
100	Aylesbury United (8)	1–0	Almondsbury Town (9)	163
101	Chalfont St Peter (9)	5–3	Gloucester City (7)	145
102	Chippenham Town (7)	2–0	Banbury United (7)	269
103	Calne Town (9)	0–5	Bashley (7)	125
104	Bitton (9)	3–2	Beaconsfield SYCOB (8)	92
105	Fairford Town (9)	1–2	Gosport Borough (8)	81
106	Winchester City (8)	0–3	AFC Totton (8)	301
107	North Leigh (8)	2–3	Chesham United (8)	160
108	Thatcham Town (8)	1–0	Swindon Supermarine (7)	103
109	Frome Town (9)	1–1	Bideford (9)	189
replay	Bideford (9)	1–3 (a.e.t.)	Frome Town (9)	193
110	Paulton Rovers (8)	3–0	Larkhall Athletic (10)	243
111	Bridgwater Town (8)	1–3	Mangotsfield United (7)	296
112	Hamworthy United (9)	2–1	Taunton Town (8)	110
113	Truro City (8)	3–1	Yate Town (7)	556
114	Clevedon Town (7)	4–1	Bridport (10)	161
115	Wimborne Town (9)	0–1	Tiverton Town (7)	389
116	Poole Town (9)	3–0	Merthyr Tydfil (7)	271

== Second round qualifying ==
Matches in the second round qualifying were played on the weekend of 27 September 2008. A total of 160 clubs took part in this stage of the competition, including the 116 winners from the first round qualifying and 44 Level 6 clubs, from Conference North and Conference South, entering at this stage. Southam United from Level 10 of English football was the lowest-ranked club to qualify for this round of the competition.

Tie	Home team (tier)	Score	Away team (tier)	Att.
1	Nantwich Town (7)	4–1	FC Halifax Town (8)	1,091
2	Kendal Town (7)	1–2	Mossley (8)	208
3	Southport (6)	3–2	Vauxhall Motors (6)	593
4	Frickley Athletic (7)	1–0	Clitheroe (8)	271
5	North Ferriby United (7)	1–4	Newcastle Blue Star (8)	134
6	Whitby Town (7)	2–2	Blyth Spartans (6)	403
replay	Blyth Spartans (6)	5–2	Whitby Town (7)	408
7	Stocksbridge Park Steels (8)	1–2	Curzon Ashton (8)	150
8	Wakefield (8)	0–3	Fleetwood Town (6)	161
9	Droylsden (6)	2–1	Bradford Park Avenue (7)	425
10	Winterton Rangers (9)	1–1	Newcastle Benfield (9)	116
replay	Newcastle Benfield (9)	2–1 (a.e.t.)	Winterton Rangers (9)	84
11	Durham City (8)	4–0	Rossendale United (8)	142
12	Whitley Bay (9)	3–1	Hyde United (6)	364
13	Guiseley (7)	2–2	Garforth Town (8)	454
replay	Garforth Town (8)	1–3	Guiseley (7)	244
14	Buxton (7)	1–0	Burscough (6)	442
15	Prescot Cables (7)	2–1	Salford City (8)	220
16	Workington (6)	0–0	Harrogate Town (6)	413
replay	Harrogate Town (6)	0–0 (5–4 p)	Workington (6)	305
17	Gateshead (6)	1–1	Witton Albion (7)	212
replay	Witton Albion (7)	1–3	Gateshead (6)	227
18	Stalybridge Celtic (6)	4–0	Farsley Celtic (6)	500
19	Sheffield (8)	4–1	Bacup Borough (9)	247
20	Coalville Town (9)	2–1	Stafford Rangers (6)	410
21	Evesham United (7)	2–2	Nuneaton Town (8)	405
replay	Nuneaton Town (8)	1–2	Evesham United (7)	508
22	Lincoln United (8)	0–1	Eastwood Town (7)	115
23	Rugby Town (7)	5–1	Long Eaton United (9)	213
24	Shepshed Dynamo (8)	1–2	Alfreton Town (6)	374
25	Chasetown (8)	1–1	Rothwell Town (8)	562
replay	Rothwell Town (8)	2–5 (a.e.t.)	Chasetown (8)	194
26	Hucknall Town (6)	3–0	Cradley Town (9)	230
27	Belper Town (8)	4–1	Redditch United (6)	301
28	Boston United (7)	2–1	Stamford (8)	1,125
29	Retford United (8)	3–1	Romulus (8)	209
30	Stourbridge (7)	1–1	Brackley Town (7)	199
replay	Brackley Town (7)	1–0	Stourbridge (7)	187
31	Halesowen Town (7)	3–0	Gainsborough Trinity (6)	502
32	Southam United (10)	1–1	Atherstone Town (8)	247
replay	Atherstone Town (8)	3–1 (a.e.t.)	Southam United (10)	267
33	Stewarts & Lloyds Corby (9)	2–3	Ilkeston Town (7)	177
34	King's Lynn (6)	2–1	Worksop Town (7)	1,080
35	AFC Telford United (6)	3–2	Corby Town (7)	1,262
36	Worcester City (6)	0–1	Tamworth (6)	898
37	Hinckley United (6)	4–1	Solihull Moors (6)	369
38	Bromley (6)	0–1	AFC Hornchurch (7)	581
39	Thurrock (6)	0–5	Boreham Wood (7)	90
40	Dunstable Town (8)	2–3	Chipstead (8)	142
41	Folkestone Invicta (8)	1–2	Horsham (7)	345
42	Wroxham (9)	2–1	Heybridge Swifts (7)	223

Tie	Home team (tier)	Score	Away team (tier)	Att.
43	Burgess Hill Town (8)	0–0	Bognor Regis Town (6)	426
replay	Bognor Regis Town (6)	0–2	Burgess Hill Town (8)	319
44	Bedford Town (7)	2–2	AFC Wimbledon (6)	1,296
replay	AFC Wimbledon (6)	3–0	Bedford Town (7)	1,370
45	Welling United (6)	1–1	Whyteleafe (8)	336
replay	Whyteleafe (8)	2–0	Welling United (6)	206
46	Bishop's Stortford (6)	3–2	Wingate & Finchley (8)	303
47	Hitchin Town (7)	0–0	Stanway Rovers (9)	293
replay	Stanway Rovers (9)	0–2	Hitchin Town (7)	154
48	St Albans City (6)	0–0	Harlow Town (7)	404
replay	Harlow Town (7)	3–2	St Albans City (6)	299
49	Erith & Belvedere (9)	0–2	Godalming Town (8)	156
50	Dulwich Hamlet (8)	2–2	Hendon (7)	353
replay	Hendon (7)	2–1	Dulwich Hamlet (8)	139
51	Merstham (8)	1–1	Thamesmead Town (8)	137
replay	Thamesmead Town (8)	1–5	Merstham (8)	
52	Leighton Town (8)	0–1	Crowborough Athletic (8)	161
53	Dartford (7)	0–1	Hampton & Richmond Borough (6)	1,061
54	Staines Town (7)	0–0	Hayes & Yeading United (6)	561
replay	Hayes & Yeading United (6)	5–3 (a.e.t.)	Staines Town (7)	348
55	Maidstone United (7)	3–2	Fisher Athletic (6)	389
56	Bury Town (8)	2–1	Chelmsford City (6)	698
57	Hemel Hempstead Town (7)	1–2	Ware (8)	202
58	Carshalton Athletic (7)	1–2	Leiston (9)	311
59	Sutton United (7)	3–1	Billericay Town (7)	410
60	Cambridge City (7)	1–1	Worthing (8)	357
replay	Worthing (8)	2–1	Cambridge City (7)	250
61	Kingstonian (8)	4–0	Braintree Town (6)	356
62	Dover Athletic (7)	3–1	Needham Market (9)	809
63	East Thurrock United (8)	3–0	VCD Athletic (9)	157
64	Arlesey Town (8)	1–4	Ashford Town (Middx) (7)	129
65	Paulton Rovers (8)	1–0	Bitton (9)	198
66	Fleet Town (8)	5–0	Newport Pagnell Town (9)	191
67	Poole Town (9)	1–3	Frome Town (9)	431
68	Bath City (6)	2–0	Clevedon Town (7)	486
69	Aylesbury United (8)	4–1	Mangotsfield United (7)	203
70	Weston-super-Mare (6)	2–4	Chesham United (8)	281
71	Eastleigh (6)	1–0	Farnborough (7)	687
72	AFC Totton (8)	2–1	Thatcham Town (8)	302
73	Havant & Waterlooville (6)	2–2	Shortwood United (9)	402
replay	Shortwood United (9)	0–1	Havant & Waterlooville (6)	310
74	Bashley (7)	2–1	Maidenhead United (6)	312
75	Basingstoke Town (6)	3–1	Hamworthy United (9)	329
76	Oxford City (7)	2–1	Tiverton Town (7)	257
77	Aylesbury Vale (9)	1–1	Gosport Borough (8)	136
replay	Gosport Borough (8)	4–0	Aylesbury Vale (9)	132
78	Dorchester Town (6)	2–2	Newport County (6)	396
replay	Newport County (6)	1–2	Dorchester Town (6)	653
79	Chalfont St Peter (9)	0–1	Team Bath (6)	190
80	Truro City (8)	1–1	Chippenham Town (7)	710
replay	Chippenham Town (7)	4–2	Truro City (8)	498

== Third round qualifying ==
Matches in the third round qualifying will be played on the weekend of 11 October 2008. The draw for the round was announced on The FA's website on 29 September 2008. A total of 80 clubs took part, all having progressed from the second round qualifying. Six clubs from Level 9 of English football were the lowest-ranked to qualify for this round of the competition.

Tie	Home team (tier)	Score	Away team (tier)	Att.
1	Belper Town (8)	4–1	Prescot Cables (7)	427
2	Guiseley (7)	3–3	Sheffield (8)	431
replay	Sheffield (8)	2–1	Guiseley (7)	451
3	Buxton (7)	0–1	Blyth Spartans (6)	556
4	Curzon Ashton (8)	4–3	Mossley (8)	492
5	Retford United (8)	1–0	Newcastle Benfield (9)	300
6	Droylsden (6)	3–2	Gateshead (6)	370
7	Eastwood Town (7)	2–2	Harrogate Town (6)	401
replay	Harrogate Town (6)	0–2	Eastwood Town (7)	283
8	Alfreton Town (6)	0–0	Ilkeston Town (7)	820
replay	Ilkeston Town (7)	1–3	Alfreton Town (6)	848
9	Stalybridge Celtic (6)	1–6	Durham City (8)	525
10	Fleetwood Town (6)	2–0	Frickley Athletic (7)	721
11	Whitley Bay (9)	1–5	Nantwich Town (7)	797
12	Newcastle Blue Star (8)	4–0	Hucknall Town (6)	290
13	Southport (6)	0–2	Boston United (7)	792
14	AFC Hornchurch (7)	2–0	Merstham (8)	473
15	Boreham Wood (7)	0–1	Brackley Town (7)	216
16	Hendon (7)	1–2	AFC Telford United (6)	377
17	Hitchin Town (7)	1–2	Hinckley United (6)	503
18	Kingstonian (8)	1–3	Hayes & Yeading United (6)	571
19	Hampton & Richmond Borough (6)	2–0	Whyteleafe (8)	501
20	Tamworth (6)	3–1	East Thurrock United (8)	608
21	Wroxham (9)	0–2	King's Lynn (6)	1,022

Tie	Home team (tier)	Score	Away team (tier)	Att.
22	Leiston (9)	1–0	Coalville Town (9)	418
23	Dover Athletic (7)	0–0	AFC Wimbledon (6)	2,710
replay	AFC Wimbledon (6)	2–0	Dover Athletic (7)	1,939
24	Evesham United (7)	2–0	Chasetown (8)	407
25	Halesowen Town (7)	1–4	Maidstone United (7)	872
26	Bishop's Stortford (6)	2–1	Rugby Town (7)	411
27	Harlow Town (7)	1–1	Crowborough Athletic (8)	609
replay	Crowborough Athletic (8)	0–2	Harlow Town (7)	323
28	Bury Town (8)	1–0	Worthing (8)	482
29	Atherstone Town (8)	1–1	Chipstead (8)	449
replay	Chipstead (8)	3–0	Atherstone Town (8)	222
30	Ware (8)	1–2	Sutton United (7)	474
31	Havant & Waterlooville (6)	2–1	Godalming Town (8)	462
32	Horsham (7)	2–1	Paulton Rovers (8)	297
33	Basingstoke Town (6)	2–2	Bashley (7)	356
replay	Bashley (7)	0–3	Basingstoke Town (6)	349
34	Oxford City (7)	2–1	Chesham United (8)	454
35	AFC Totton (8)	5–2	Fleet Town (8)	402
36	Ashford Town (Middx) (7)	1–0	Chippenham Town (7)	277
37	Frome Town (9)	2–2	Team Bath (6)	504
replay	Team Bath (6)	4–0	Frome Town (9)	438
38	Burgess Hill Town (8)	2–1	Eastleigh (6)	336
39	Dorchester Town (6)	1–0	Gosport Borough (8)	436
40	Bath City (6)	0–1	Aylesbury United (8)	577

== Fourth round qualifying ==
Matches in the fourth round qualifying were played on the weekend of 25 October 2008. A total of 64 clubs took part, 40 having progressed from the third round qualifying and 24 clubs from the Conference Premier, forming Level 5 of English football, entering at this stage. Leiston from Level 9 of English football was the lowest-ranked club to qualify for this round of the competition.

Tie	Home team (tier)	Score	Away team (tier)	Att.
1	Hinckley United (6)	1–1	Curzon Ashton (8)	555
replay	Curzon Ashton (8)	1–1 (3–2 p)	Hinckley United (6)	519
2	Kettering Town (5)	3–0	Burton Albion (5)	1,726
3	Tamworth (6)	0–4	Barrow (5)	1,012
4	King's Lynn (6)	1–5	Kidderminster Harriers (5)	1,460
5	Boston United (7)	2–3	Cambridge United (5)	1,956
6	Newcastle Blue Star (8)	1–2	Altrincham (5)	305
7	Droylsden (6)	0–0	Belper Town (8)	557
replay	Belper Town (8)	1–2	Droylsden (6)	568
8	Durham City (8)	2–2	Histon (5)	257
replay	Histon (5)	5–2	Durham City (8)	441
9	Retford United (8)	1–3	Alfreton Town (6)	922
10	Northwich Victoria (5)	0–3	AFC Telford United (6)	1,003
11	Blyth Spartans (6)	3–1	Sheffield (8)	680
12	York City (5)	0–0	Mansfield Town (5)	1,976
replay	Mansfield Town (5)	1–0	York City (5)	2,004
13	Fleetwood Town (6)	4–3	Nantwich Town (7)	808
14	Wrexham (5)	0–0	Eastwood Town (7)	3,115
replay	Eastwood Town (7)	2–0	Wrexham (5)	860
15	Stevenage Borough (5)	2–2	Horsham (7)	1,051
replay	Horsham (7)	1–4	Stevenage Borough (5)	641

Tie	Home team (tier)	Score	Away team (tier)	Att.
16	Woking (5)	2–2	Ebbsfleet United (5)	1,462
replay	Ebbsfleet United (5)	1–0	Woking (5)	869
17	Hampton & Richmond Borough (6)	0–1	Brackley Town (7)	582
18	Oxford United (5)	2–0	Hayes & Yeading United (6)	2,521
19	Maidstone United (7)	0–1	AFC Wimbledon (6)	1,719
20	Team Bath (6)	1–0	Salisbury City (5)	649
21	Dorchester Town (6)	1–0	Bishop's Stortford (6)	433
22	Oxford City (7)	0–1	Eastbourne Borough (5)	564
23	Ashford Town (Middx) (7)	0–0	Forest Green Rovers (5)	337
replay	Forest Green Rovers (5)	4–0	Ashford Town (Middx) (7)	425
24	Evesham United (7)	2–0	Rushden & Diamonds (5)	609
25	Bury Town (8)	4–1	Basingstoke Town (6)	1,121
26	Burgess Hill Town (8)	0–3	Harlow Town (7)	845
27	Grays Athletic (5)	2–0	AFC Totton (8)	590
28	Aylesbury United (8)	0–1	Sutton United (7)	554
29	Torquay United (5)	4–1	Chipstead (8)	1,800
30	Leiston (9)	1–1	Lewes (5)	847
replay	Lewes (5)	1–3	Leiston (9)	363
31	Crawley Town (5)	0–3	Havant & Waterlooville (6)	1,253
32	Weymouth (5)	1–2	AFC Hornchurch (7)	904

== Competition proper ==
See 2008–09 FA Cup for details of the rounds from the first round proper onwards.
