= 2000–01 West Midlands (Regional) League =

The 2000–01 West Midlands (Regional) League season was the 101st in the history of the West Midlands (Regional) League, an English association football competition for semi-professional and amateur teams based in the West Midlands county, Shropshire, Herefordshire, Worcestershire and southern Staffordshire.

== Premier Division ==
West Midlands League Premier Division
- Season: 2000–01
- Champions: Ludlow Town
- Promoted: Ludlow Town
- Matches: 506
- Goals: 1,710 (3.38 per match)

The Premier Division featured 20 clubs which competed in the division last season, along with three new clubs:

- Bromyard Town, promoted from Division One South
- Shawbury United, promoted from Division One North
- Wellington, promoted from Division One South

Also, Smethwick Rangers changed name to Warley Rangers.

=== League table ===
Pos	Team	Pld	W	D	L	GF	GA	GD	Pts	Promotion or relegation
1	Ludlow Town	44	34	9	1	100	35	+65	111	Promoted to the Midland Football Alliance
2	Warley Rangers	44	29	7	8	129	54	+75	94	
3	Little Drayton Rangers	44	27	7	10	91	53	+38	88	
4	Darlaston Town	44	24	7	13	111	76	+35	79	
5	Causeway United	44	22	11	11	78	47	+31	77	
6	Shawbury United	44	22	6	16	77	59	+18	72	
7	Malvern Town	44	19	16	9	83	67	+16	72 (Note: Malvern Town deducted one point.)	
8	Kington Town	44	19	9	16	92	78	+14	66	
9	Lye Town	44	18	12	14	68	63	+5	66	
10	Wolverhampton Casuals	44	17	12	15	80	65	+15	63	
11	Wellington	44	19	6	19	67	73	−6	63	
12	Tividale	44	16	11	17	72	74	−2	59	
13	Star	44	15	12	17	77	69	+8	57	
14	Westfields	44	14	14	16	60	63	−3	56	
15	Heath Hayes	44	15	8	21	63	74	−11	53	
16	Bustleholme	44	15	6	23	79	91	−12	51	
17	Ettingshall Holy Trinity	44	14	9	21	58	80	−22	51	
18	Dudley Town	44	13	8	23	48	72	−24	47	
19	Bromyard Town	44	10	10	24	51	97	−46	40	
20	Walsall Wood	44	9	10	25	56	80	−24	37	
21	Gornal Athletic	44	10	7	27	59	105	−46	37	
22	Brierley Hill Town	44	10	7	27	50	127	−77	37	
23	Tipton Town	44	10	6	28	61	108	−47	36	

Source: fchd
Rules for classification: 1) points; 2) goal difference; 3) number of goals scored.
