= 2003–04 West Midlands (Regional) League =

The 2003–04 West Midlands (Regional) League season was the 104th in the history of the West Midlands (Regional) League, an English association football competition for semi-professional and amateur teams based in the West Midlands county, Shropshire, Herefordshire, Worcestershire and southern Staffordshire.

== Premier Division ==
West Midlands League Premier Division
- Season: 2003–04
- Champions: Malvern Town
- Promoted: Malvern Town
- Matches: 380
- Goals: 1,462 (3.85 per match)

The Premier Division featured 19 clubs which competed in the division last season, along with two new clubs:

- Newport (Shropshire), promoted from Division One North
- Wednesfield, relegated from the Midland Football Alliance

Also, Little Drayton Rangers changed name to Market Drayton Town and Sedgeley White Lions changed name to Coseley Town.

=== League table ===
Pos	Team	Pld	W	D	L	GF	GA	GD	Pts	Promotion or relegation
1	Malvern Town	38	29	3	6	134	38	+96	90	Promoted to the Midland Football Alliance
2	Tipton Town	38	26	8	4	105	36	+69	86	
3	Kington Town	38	26	2	10	100	62	+38	80	
4	Shawbury United	38	21	10	7	73	56	+17	73	
5	Ledbury Town	38	22	6	10	96	60	+36	72	
6	Heath Hayes	38	20	6	12	81	48	+33	66	
7	Market Drayton Town	38	19	8	11	69	54	+15	65	
8	Tividale	38	18	8	12	81	55	+26	62	
9	Wellington	38	18	8	12	74	54	+20	62	
10	Lye Town	38	19	5	14	62	52	+10	62	
11	Bromyard Town	38	17	7	14	78	66	+12	58	
12	Brierley & Hagley	38	14	7	17	59	68	−9	49	
13	Bustleholme	38	13	3	22	76	85	−9	42	
14	Dudley Town	38	11	9	18	65	81	−16	42	
15	Ettingshall Holy Trinity	38	12	4	22	58	90	−32	40	
16	Wolverhampton United	38	12	3	23	63	116	−53	39	Demoted to Division One
17	Smethwick Sikh Temple	38	11	5	22	65	93	−28	38	
18	Wednesfield	38	11	4	23	49	125	−76	37	
19	Wolverhampton Casuals	38	7	2	29	51	106	−55	23	
20	Coseley Town	38	0	3	35	23	117	−94	3	
21	Newport (Shropshire)	0	0	0	0	0	0	0	0	Club folded, record expunged

Source: fchd
Rules for classification: 1) points; 2) goal difference; 3) number of goals scored.
