= 2013–14 West Midlands (Regional) League =

The 2013–14 West Midlands (Regional) League season was the 114th in the history of the West Midlands (Regional) League, an English association football competition for semi-professional and amateur teams based in the West Midlands county, Shropshire, Herefordshire, Worcestershire and southern Staffordshire. It has three divisions, the highest of which is the Premier Division, which sits at step 6 of the National League System, or the tenth level of the overall English football league system.

== Premier Division ==
West Midlands League Premier Division
- Season: 2013–14
- Champions: Lye Town
- Promoted: Lye Town
- Relegated: Bustleholme; Bromyard Town
- Matches: 462
- Goals: 1,865 (4.04 per match)

The Premier Division featured 20 clubs which competed in the division last season, along with three new clubs:

- Bilston Town, promoted from Division One
- Ellesmere Rangers, relegated from the Midland Football Alliance
- Smethwick Rangers, promoted from Division One

=== League table ===
Pos	Team	Pld	W	D	L	GF	GA	GD	Pts	Promotion or relegation
1	Lye Town	42	31	8	3	141	39	+102	101	Promoted to the Midland League
2	Pegasus Juniors	42	32	4	6	127	44	+83	100	
3	Wolverhampton Casuals	42	31	5	6	128	68	+60	98	
4	Shawbury United	42	30	7	5	139	50	+89	97	
5	Black Country Rangers	42	29	2	11	120	58	+62	86 (Note: Black County Rangers deducted 3 points)	
6	Sporting Khalsa	42	26	4	12	130	63	+67	82	
7	Bewdley Town	42	20	5	17	94	75	+19	65	
8	Wellington	42	19	8	15	86	87	−1	65	
9	Dudley Town	42	19	6	17	101	87	+14	63	
10	Cradley Town	42	19	5	18	89	87	+2	62	
11	Ellesmere Rangers	42	18	7	17	91	87	+4	61	
12	Smethwick Rangers	42	16	5	21	87	100	−13	53	
13	Wellington Amateurs	42	15	6	21	78	88	−10	51	
14	Malvern Town	42	16	3	23	74	95	−21	51	
15	Wednesfield	42	14	8	20	72	79	−7	50	
16	Bilston Town	42	13	4	25	77	107	−30	43	
17	Dudley Sports	42	11	10	21	64	107	−43	43	
18	Wolverhampton Sporting Community	42	10	7	25	54	97	−43	37	
19	Shifnal Town	42	9	6	27	49	104	−55	32 (Note: Shifnal Town deducted 1 point)	
20	Willenhall Town	42	7	7	28	50	133	−83	28	
21	Bustleholme	42	6	8	28	57	152	−95	26	Relegated to Division One
22	Bromyard Town	42	7	3	32	40	141	−101	24	Relegated to Division One
23	Bartley Green	0	0	0	0	0	0	0	0	Club folded, record expunged

Source: fchd
Rules for classification: 1) points; 2) goal difference; 3) number of goals scored.

=== Results ===
Home \ Away	BEW	BIL	BLA	BRO	BUS	CRA	DUD	DUT	ELL	LYE	MAL	PEJ	SHA	SHI	SME	SPK	WED	WEH	WEL	WIL	WOC	WSC
Bewdley Town		4–2	0–6	0–1	6–0	4–1	6–0	1–2	2–0	3–2	0–0	0–1	0–0	3–1	2–4	5–2	1–1	0–3	1–4	3–1	6–1	3–0
Bilston Town	2–2		1–3	6–1	6–1	0–3	2–1	1–4	3–2	1–2	1–3	2–4	1–2	3–2	1–4	0–4	1–4	3–0	2–0	1–1	0–2	2–0
Black Country Rangers	4–2	3–2		5–0	5–0	3–0	2–3	5–1	1–3	1–3	0–2	1–2	1–0	5–0	3–2	4–1	6–1	3–1	4–1	4–1	0–2	3–2
Bromyard Town	1–2	1–3	1–8		2–1	2–4	1–3	1–5	2–4	0–3	3–1	0–2	1–1	1–0	1–2	0–8	1–1	3–6	0–5	1–5	1–5	0–3
Bustleholme	1–3	3–3	1–1	1–1		3–3	2–5	0–5	1–7	1–7	3–1	0–5	2–8	3–1	0–5	2–2	1–3	1–1	0–2	5–4	2–5	3–1
Cradley Town	2–0	1–0	1–3	2–1	5–0		3–2	2–4	3–2	2–3	2–0	3–1	0–4	4–1	4–1	1–1	1–1	1–2	7–0	2–0	1–5	2–2
Dudley Sports	1–6	2–1	2–2	3–4	3–4	2–3		1–0	2–1	0–0	1–2	0–2	1–2	2–0	0–5	1–10	1–2	1–1	1–2	2–1	0–1	3–3
Dudley Town	4–4	4–0	1–2	3–0	5–0	2–2	5–1		1–5	2–2	2–2	1–3	1–2	0–2	6–2	2–1	0–5	0–3	3–1	6–1	2–3	2–0
Ellesmere Rangers	1–6	0–1	0–2	3–1	4–1	1–0	2–2	2–1		1–2	1–2	2–4	1–1	2–0	1–3	2–0	2–3	3–0	1–0	3–0	6–6	0–0
Lye Town	4–2	5–2	2–0	3–0	6–0	3–0	8–0	9–2	2–1		5–0	1–1	3–1	7–0	4–0	2–1	4–1	3–1	2–0	7–0	1–1	6–0
Malvern Town	2–1	2–1	2–5	3–1	4–1	2–1	3–0	9–1	1–2	2–0		0–3	1–3	0–0	4–0	2–6	1–8	2–5	1–3	3–1	3–6	3–1
Pegasus Juniors	2–1	7–3	2–4	6–0	4–1	3–0	6–1	2–1	8–0	1–0	1–0		0–2	4–0	1–4	2–0	3–1	2–2	2–2	7–0	4–0	4–1
Shawbury United	2–0	4–0	4–0	8–1	8–1	4–1	2–2	3–2	6–1	3–4	4–2	5–2		2–1	5–2	1–2	6–1	2–1	3–1	6–0	0–3	6–0
Shifnal Town	0–1	2–1	1–2	1–3	2–2	1–2	3–4	0–3	2–2	1–7	3–1	2–1	1–7		0–3	0–4	0–1	2–2	5–1	0–0	3–2	1–0
Smethwick Rangers	3–0	1–1	0–5	5–0	2–1	2–1	1–0	1–1	2–5	1–2	3–1	2–3	3–5	1–4		1–6	0–3	0–2	2–2	1–3	2–2	2–3
Sporting Khalsa	3–1	2–0	3–1	8–0	2–1	3–2	2–3	1–2	5–1	0–0	4–0	0–5	0–3	4–0	6–1		3–3	2–1	4–1	5–2	0–3	3–1
Wednesfield	0–3	2–0	0–2	2–1	0–2	5–1	1–1	0–2	3–3	1–3	3–2	0–1	0–0	2–4	1–1	1–2		1–2	1–3	2–3	1–2	1–3
Wellington	5–1	7–2	1–0	0–1	2–1	3–0	2–2	1–6	1–6	0–6	2–1	0–8	3–4	1–1	2–0	2–4	1–0		1–0	4–0	1–3	4–1
Wellington Amateurs	2–4	5–0	2–4	2–1	4–0	5–3	0–0	1–1	3–4	2–2	2–1	0–2	0–2	4–0	1–5	1–5	0–2	3–4		2–2	2–4	4–0
Willenhall Town	1–4	1–8	0–1	3–0	1–1	2–4	0–5	0–4	1–1	1–3	0–2	1–1	2–6	2–0	3–2	0–8	0–3	1–1	0–2		0–6	2–0
Wolverhampton Casuals	3–0	4–5	5–3	4–0	4–2	2–4	4–0	2–1	2–0	2–2	4–0	1–4	0–0	3–1	3–2	2–1	4–0	4–2	2–1	5–3		3–2
Wolverhampton Sporting Community	0–1	2–3	0–3	1–0	4–2	2–5	0–0	4–1	1–3	1–1	2–1	0–1	2–2	2–1	2–4	1–2	2–1	3–3	0–2	2–1	0–3	

Legend: Blue = home team win; Yellow = draw; Red = away team win.
