= 1980–81 West Midlands (Regional) League =

The 1980–81 West Midlands (Regional) League season was the 81st in the history of the West Midlands (Regional) League, an English association football competition for semi-professional and amateur teams based in the West Midlands county, Shropshire, Herefordshire, Worcestershire and southern Staffordshire.

== Premier Division ==
West Midlands League Premier Division
- Season: 1980–81
- Champions: Shifnal Town
- Matches: 462
- Goals: 1,361 (2.95 per match)

The Premier Division featured 21 clubs which competed in the division last season, along with one club, promoted from Division One:

- Rushall Olympic

=== League table ===
Pos	Team	Pld	W	D	L	GF	GA	GD	Pts	Promotion or relegation
1	Shifnal Town	42	31	7	4	89	33	+56	69	
2	Lye Town	42	27	9	6	80	36	+44	63	
3	Willenhall Town	42	25	11	6	93	41	+52	61	
4	Brereton Social	42	22	8	12	74	51	+23	52	
5	Hednesford Town	42	20	11	11	73	48	+25	51	
6	Coventry Sporting	42	19	12	11	75	54	+21	50	
7	Ledbury Town	42	19	10	13	74	52	+22	48	
8	Dudley Town	42	19	10	13	55	44	+11	48	
9	Sutton Coldfield Town	42	18	10	14	71	56	+15	46	
10	Bilston	42	18	10	14	78	65	+13	46	
11	Armitage	42	20	5	17	58	59	−1	45	
12	Rushall Olympic	42	15	13	14	50	52	−2	43	
13	Blakenall	42	14	15	13	55	58	−3	43	
14	Darlaston	42	17	5	20	68	95	−27	39	
15	Gresley Rovers	41	13	9	19	46	62	−16	35	
16	Halesowen Town	42	10	15	17	53	67	−14	35	
17	Wednesfield Social	42	11	11	20	52	67	−15	33	
18	VS Rugby	42	9	10	23	50	80	−30	28	
19	Tividale	42	5	17	20	35	64	−29	27	
20	Malvern Town	42	9	7	26	56	93	−37	25	
21	Brierley Hill Alliance	42	6	8	28	33	85	−52	20	Resigned from the league
22	Hinckley Athletic	42	3	10	29	43	99	−56	16	

Source: nonleaguematters
Rules for classification: 1) points; 2) goal difference; 3) number of goals scored.
