= 2008–09 West Midlands (Regional) League =

The 2008–09 West Midlands (Regional) League season was the 109th in the history of the West Midlands (Regional) League, an English association football competition for semi-professional and amateur teams based in the West Midlands county, Shropshire, Herefordshire, Worcestershire and southern Staffordshire. It has three divisions, the highest of which is the Premier Division, which sits at step 6 of the National League System, or the tenth level of the overall English football league system.

== Premier Division ==
West Midlands League Premier Division
- Season: 2008–09
- Champions: AFC Wulfrunians
- Matches: 420
- Goals: 1,499 (3.57 per match)

The Premier Division featured 19 clubs which competed in the division last season, along with two new clubs, promoted from Division One:

- Birchills United
- Heath Town Rangers

Also, Birchills United changed name to Bloxwich United.

=== League table ===
| Pos | Team | Pld | W | D | L | GF | GA | GD | Pts | Promotion or relegation |
|---|---|---|---|---|---|---|---|---|---|---|
| 1 | AFC Wulfrunians | 40 | 28 | 3 | 9 | 89 | 47 | +42 | 87 | |
| 2 | Bloxwich United | 40 | 27 | 4 | 9 | 123 | 50 | +73 | 85 | |
| 3 | Bewdley Town | 40 | 26 | 7 | 7 | 107 | 52 | +55 | 85 | |
| 4 | Ellesmere Rangers | 40 | 25 | 7 | 8 | 105 | 45 | +60 | 82 | |
| 5 | Dudley Town | 40 | 24 | 7 | 9 | 91 | 55 | +36 | 79 | |
| 6 | Wellington | 40 | 21 | 6 | 13 | 76 | 62 | +14 | 69 | |
| 7 | Darlaston Town | 40 | 20 | 6 | 14 | 67 | 58 | +9 | 66 | |
| 8 | Heath Town Rangers | 40 | 19 | 4 | 17 | 68 | 68 | 0 | 58 (Note: Heath Town Rangers deducted 3 points) | |
| 9 | Wednesfield | 40 | 16 | 11 | 13 | 68 | 59 | +9 | 59 | |
| 10 | Shawbury United | 40 | 16 | 9 | 15 | 59 | 66 | −7 | 57 | |
| 11 | Lye Town | 40 | 16 | 7 | 17 | 69 | 62 | +7 | 55 | |
| 12 | Dudley Sports | 40 | 15 | 10 | 15 | 53 | 55 | −2 | 55 | |
| 13 | Tividale | 40 | 15 | 8 | 17 | 63 | 64 | −1 | 53 | |
| 14 | Bromyard Town | 40 | 14 | 8 | 18 | 61 | 67 | −6 | 50 | |
| 15 | Gornal Athletic | 40 | 13 | 10 | 17 | 56 | 60 | −4 | 49 | |
| 16 | Goodrich | 40 | 10 | 11 | 19 | 58 | 88 | −30 | 41 | |
| 17 | Ludlow Town | 40 | 12 | 5 | 23 | 66 | 99 | −33 | 41 | |
| 18 | Pelsall Villa | 40 | 7 | 13 | 20 | 53 | 72 | −19 | 34 | Transferred to the Midland Football Combination |
| 19 | Wolverhampton Casuals | 40 | 10 | 2 | 28 | 60 | 113 | −53 | 32 | |
| 20 | Ledbury Town | 40 | 8 | 7 | 25 | 68 | 128 | −60 | 31 | |
| 21 | Bustleholme | 40 | 4 | 3 | 33 | 39 | 129 | −90 | 15 | |

Source: fchd
Rules for classification: 1) points; 2) goal difference; 3) number of goals scored.
