= 1990–91 West Midlands (Regional) League =

The 1990–91 West Midlands (Regional) League season was the 91st in the history of the West Midlands (Regional) League, an English association football competition for semi-professional and amateur teams based in the West Midlands county, Shropshire, Herefordshire, Worcestershire and southern Staffordshire.

== Premier Division ==
West Midlands League Premier Division
- Season: 1990–91
- Champions: Gresley Rovers
- Matches: 462
- Goals: 1,422 (3.08 per match)

The Premier Division featured 19 clubs which competed in the division last season, along with three new clubs:

- Darlaston, promoted from Division One
- Ilkeston Town, joined from the Central Midlands League
- Pelsall Villa, promoted from Division One

Also, Millfields changed name to West Bromwich Town.

=== League table ===
Pos	Team	Pld	W	D	L	GF	GA	GD	Pts	Promotion or relegation
1	Gresley Rovers	42	32	5	5	104	36	+68	101	
2	Chasetown	42	24	13	5	79	32	+47	85	
3	Oldbury United	42	23	14	5	75	37	+38	83	
4	Darlaston	42	20	11	11	89	67	+22	71	Demoted to Division One
5	Hinckley Athletic	42	20	10	12	76	51	+25	70	
6	Wednesfield	42	21	7	14	76	59	+17	70	
7	Ilkeston Town	42	19	12	11	75	49	+26	69	Demoted to Division One
8	West Bromwich Town	42	19	11	12	76	51	+25	68	
9	Lye Town	42	19	10	13	53	41	+12	67	
10	Halesowen Harriers	42	19	9	14	84	54	+30	66	
11	Rocester	42	18	12	12	72	44	+28	66	
12	Rushall Olympic	42	17	12	13	67	51	+16	63	
13	Stourport Swifts	42	15	13	14	74	56	+18	58	
14	Blakenall	42	14	16	12	56	59	−3	58	
15	Pelsall Villa	42	10	14	18	49	64	−15	44	
16	Wolverhampton Casuals	42	11	10	21	50	98	−48	43	Demoted to Division One
17	Paget Rangers	42	10	8	24	50	94	−44	38	
18	Oldswinford	42	9	10	23	60	89	−29	37	
19	Tividale	42	9	5	28	45	100	−55	32	Demoted to Division One
20	Westfields	42	9	11	22	49	87	−38	38	
21	Malvern Town	42	6	7	29	36	106	−70	25	
22	Tipton Town	42	4	8	30	27	97	−70	20	Demoted to Division One

Source: nonleaguematters
Rules for classification: 1) points; 2) goal difference; 3) number of goals scored.
