= 1999–2000 West Midlands (Regional) League =

The 1999–2000 West Midlands (Regional) League season was the 100th in the history of the West Midlands (Regional) League, an English association football competition for semi-professional and amateur teams based in the West Midlands county, Shropshire, Herefordshire, Worcestershire and southern Staffordshire.

== Premier Division ==
West Midlands League Premier Division
- Season: 1999–2000
- Champions: Stafford Town
- Promoted: Stafford Town
- Matches: 462
- Goals: 1,528 (3.31 per match)

The Premier Division featured 19 clubs which competed in the division last season, along with three new clubs:

- Causeway United, promoted from Division One South
- Heath Hayes, promoted from Division One North
- Little Drayton Rangers, promoted from Division One North

=== League table ===
| Pos | Team | Pld | W | D | L | GF | GA | GD | Pts | Promotion or relegation |
|---|---|---|---|---|---|---|---|---|---|---|
| 1 | Stafford Town | 42 | 35 | 4 | 3 | 113 | 32 | +81 | 109 | Promoted to the Midland Football Alliance |
| 2 | Causeway United | 42 | 34 | 2 | 6 | 88 | 35 | +53 | 104 | |
| 3 | Darlaston Town | 42 | 30 | 5 | 7 | 115 | 63 | +52 | 95 | |
| 4 | Bandon | 42 | 26 | 7 | 9 | 83 | 46 | +37 | 85 | Resigned from the league |
| 5 | Wolverhampton Casuals | 42 | 25 | 6 | 11 | 99 | 54 | +45 | 81 | |
| 6 | Kington Town | 42 | 25 | 3 | 14 | 88 | 68 | +20 | 72 (Note: Kington deducted six points.) | |
| 7 | Tividale | 42 | 19 | 9 | 14 | 66 | 58 | +8 | 66 | |
| 8 | Heath Hayes | 42 | 19 | 4 | 19 | 64 | 66 | −2 | 61 | |
| 9 | Malvern Town | 42 | 17 | 7 | 18 | 73 | 55 | +18 | 58 | |
| 10 | Little Drayton Rangers | 42 | 16 | 10 | 16 | 64 | 66 | −2 | 58 | |
| 11 | Lye Town | 42 | 15 | 9 | 18 | 65 | 66 | −1 | 54 | |
| 12 | Dudley Town | 42 | 13 | 13 | 16 | 53 | 59 | −6 | 52 | |
| 13 | Gornal Athletic | 42 | 14 | 4 | 24 | 58 | 75 | −17 | 46 | |
| 14 | Tipton Town | 42 | 12 | 9 | 21 | 61 | 87 | −26 | 45 | |
| 15 | Smethwick Rangers | 42 | 12 | 8 | 22 | 66 | 95 | −29 | 44 | |
| 16 | Ettingshall Holy Trinity | 42 | 11 | 10 | 21 | 53 | 91 | −38 | 43 | |
| 17 | Brierley Hill Town | 42 | 11 | 8 | 23 | 51 | 73 | −22 | 41 | |
| 18 | Ludlow Town | 42 | 10 | 11 | 21 | 52 | 75 | −23 | 41 | |
| 19 | Bustleholme | 42 | 10 | 9 | 23 | 68 | 95 | −27 | 39 | |
| 20 | Westfields | 42 | 9 | 9 | 24 | 56 | 89 | −33 | 36 | |
| 21 | Walsall Wood | 42 | 8 | 10 | 24 | 55 | 99 | −44 | 34 | |
| 22 | Star | 42 | 8 | 9 | 25 | 37 | 81 | −44 | 33 | |

Source: fchd
Rules for classification: 1) points; 2) goal difference; 3) number of goals scored.
