= Staffordshire County League (South) =

English football league

The Staffordshire County League (South) was an English football league that existed from 1892 until 1996 and catered for clubs in the South Staffordshire area. It was also known at various times as the Walsall & District Junior League, Walsall & District League, and Walsall Senior League.

== History ==
The league was formed as the Walsall & District Junior League in May 1892 following a meeting of representatives of various local clubs at the People's Coffee House in Walsall. The nine founder members were Bloxwich Strollers, Brownhills Albion, Cannock Town, Cotterill's (Darlaston), Lichfield Leomansley, Tettenhall Wood, Walsall Rangers, Wolverhampton Presbyterians and Wolverhampton St Chad's, but Lichfield Leomansley and Walsall Rangers withdrew during the 1892–93 season and their playing records were removed. Brownhills Albion won the inaugural championship, losing only one of their twelve matches. In 1897 the league dropped the word "Junior" from its title, as its member clubs were felt to be of a higher standard than the name suggested. A new Walsall & District Junior League was formed the following year for lesser clubs. As with many other leagues in this era, clubs left the league and new clubs joined almost every season, with the league fluctuating in size every year. In 1908 a Second Division was added, but it lasted for only one season. The league then began to decline in size until in the 1913–14 season only five teams competed, and one of those resigned after only three matches. After that season, the league shut down for the duration of the First World War.

The league resumed in 1920 with 15 member clubs, including the reserve teams of a number of more senior clubs, and a year later was renamed the Walsall Senior League. Following the 1922–23 season, however, a number of clubs resigned to join the Birmingham Combination and the league closed down once again, owing to insufficient numbers. It resumed play in 1930, once again as the Walsall & District League, but once again gradually declined in size, as clubs found it hard to continue during the difficult economic conditions of the 1930s. The league once again shut down during the Second World War.

After the war the league once again adopted the Walsall Senior League name, but in 1950 adopted its final name of the Staffordshire County League (South). In the early 1950s the competition was dominated by Shelfield Athletic, who won the league for five consecutive seasons. A Second Division was again added in 1956, but once again it only lasted for one season.

== Champions ==
Walsall & District Junior League

Season	Champions
1892–93	Brownhills Albion
1893–94	Willenhall Pickwick
1894–95	Willenhall Pickwick
1895–96	Bilston United
1896–97	Bloxwich Strollers

Walsall & District League

Season	Champions
1897–98	Brownhills Albion
1898–99	Willenhall Pickwick
1899–1900	Wednesbury Old Athletic
1900–01	Bilston United
1901–02	Bilston United
1902–03	Bloxwich Strollers
1903–04	Darlaston
1904–05	Wednesbury Old Athletic
1905–06	Darlaston
1906–07	Willenhall Swifts
1907–08	St George's Victoria

Division Two was added in 1908.

Season	Division One	Division Two
1908–09	Wellington St George's	Pelsall Villa

Division Two was abandoned after one season.

Season	Champions
1909–10	West Cannock
1910–11	2nd Royal Warwickshire Regiment
1911–12	Bloxwich Strollers
1912–13	Shelfield Villa
1913–14	Shelfield Villa

The League was inactive between 1914 and 1920.

Season	Champions
1920–21	Sunbeam Motors

Walsall Senior League

Season	Champions
1921–22	Shrewsbury Town reserves
1922–23	Sunbeam Motors

The League was inactive between 1923 and 1930.

Walsall & District League

Season	Champions
1930–31	Cannock Chase Colliery
1931–32	Hazel Slade Rovers
1932–33	Bilston Borough
1933–34	Walsall Wood
1934–35	Cannock Chase Colliery
1935–36	Bilston Borough
1936–37	Cannock Chase Colliery
1937–38	Cannock Chase Colliery
1938–39	Cannock Chase Colliery

The League was inactive from 1939 until 1945

Walsall Senior League

Season	Champions
1945–46	Walsall Wood
1946–47	Walsall Wood
1947–48	Bilston
1948–49	Sutton Town
1949–50	Walsall Trinity

Staffordshire County League (South)

Season	Champions
1950–51	Brereton Social
1951–52	Shelfield Athletic
1952–53	Shelfield Athletic
1953–54	Shelfield Athletic
1954–55	Shelfield Athletic
1955–56	Shelfield Athletic

Division Two was added in 1956.

Season	Division One	Division Two
1956–57	Armitage	Rushall Olympic

Division Two was abandoned after one season.

Season	Champions
1957–58	Shelfield Athletic
1958–59	Stafford Rangers reserves
1959–60	Brereton Social
1960–61	Rushall Olympic
1961–62	Rushall Olympic
1962–63	Rushall Olympic
1963–64	Hednesford reserves

Division Two was added in 1964.

Season	Division One	Division Two
1964–65	Rushall Olympic	Bentley Estate

Division Two was abandoned after one season.

Season	Champions
1965–66	Kingston
1966–67	Oxley
1967–68	Oxley
1968–69	Kingswinford United

Division Two was added in 1969.

Season	Division One	Division Two
1969–70	unknown	Burntwood Institute
1970–71	Kingwsinford United	Little Bloxwich
1971–72	Great Wyrley Wednesday	Rowley Regis
1972–73	Staffordshire & Stoke Police	Ogley Hay
1973–74	Oldswinford	Walsall 'A'

In 1974 Division One was renamed the Premier Division and Division Two was renamed Division One.

Season	Premier Division	Division One
1974–75	Willenhall Town	unknown
1975–76	Great Wyrley	Penkridge Town
1976–77	Great Wyrley	Heath Hayes Cons
1977–78	Wolverhampton United	Brownhills United
1978–79	Wolverhampton United	unknown
1979–80	unknown	unknown
1980–81	New World	Hednesford Progressive
1981–82	unknown	Bloxwich Town
1982–83	unknown	unknown
1983–84	Hednesford Progressive	unknown
1984–85	Chasetown reserves	Bloxwich Strollers
1985–86	unknown	unknown
1986–87	Rushall	unknown
1987–88	Heath Hayes Cons	Chamberlin & Hill
1988–89	Heath Hayes Cons	unknown
1989–90	Bilston Community College	unknown
1990–91	unknown	AFC Thatch
1991–92	Bilston Community College	Cannock Town
1992–93	Bilston Community College	Mahal

The League was reduced to a single division in 1993.

Season	Champions
1993–94	Beechdale Social
1994–95	Mahal
1995–96	unknown

The League folded in 1996.
