= Tipton Sports Academy =

Multi-purpose sports stadium in Tipton, England

Coordinates: 52.54533°N 2.053306°W

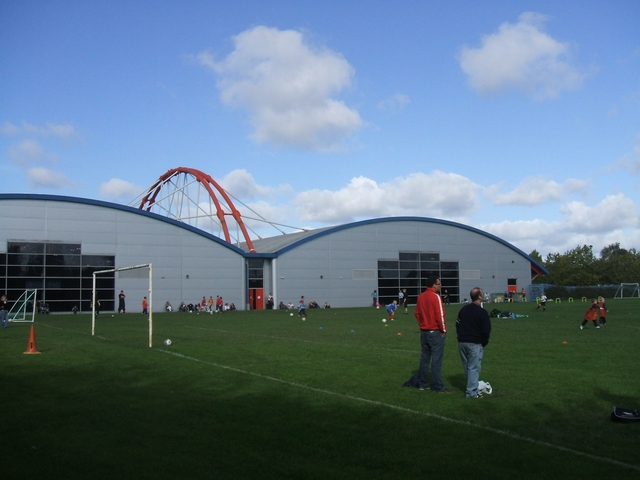
Tipton Sports Academy

Tipton Sports Academy is a multi-purpose sports stadium located on Wednesbury Oak Road in Tipton, West Midlands, England.

It includes a running track, a football pitch and indoor tennis courts. The synthetic running track was laid out in 1998 to replace a cinder track. This work was completed at the same time as the indoor tennis courts, and the full cost of upgrading the complex (more than £3million) was paid by the National Lottery. It was opened by the then Deputy Prime Minister John Prescott at an official ceremony on 12 June 1998.

Prince Philip, Duke of Edinburgh, had opened the headquarters of Tipton Sports Union Trust at the site on 4 June 1971. These facilities were replaced by those opened by John Prescott, 27 years later.

The complex is home to Tipton Town Football Club, the Sandwell Steelers American Football team, and Tipton Harriers. Its facilities are used by various professional and amateur teams as well as members of the public.
