= Bilston Town F.C. =

Association football club in England

Coordinates: 52.566435°N 2.0656255°W

Bilston Town Community F.C.
- Full name: Bilston Town Community Football Club
- Nickname: The Steelmen
- Founded: 1894
- Ground: Queen Street Stadium, Bilston
- Chairman: Jay Morgan
- Manager: Dave King
- League: North West Counties League Division One South
- 2025–26: Midland League Division One, 8th of 21 (transferred)
Home colours	Away colours

Bilston Town Football Club is a football club based in Bilston, West Midlands, England. Having played under the names Bilston United, Bilston Borough, Bilston, Bilston Town, Bilston Town (2007) and Bilston Town Community, they are currently members of the North West Counties League Division One South and play at Queen Street.

== History ==
The club was founded in 1894 as a merger of Bilston Rovers and Bilston Wanderers, and was initially known as Bilston United. In the same year they joined the Walsall & District Junior League. After finishing fourth in their first season, they won the league in 1895–96. The league was renamed the Walsall & District League in 1897 and the club were runners-up in 1898–99. They won the league again in 1900–01 and retained the title the following season, before finishing as runners-up in 1902–03. After finishing third in 1906–07, the club moved up to the Birmingham Combination, where they finished as runners-up in their first season.

Bilston remained in the Combination until the end of the 1920–21 season, when they joined the Birmingham & District League. They were runners-up to Shrewsbury Town in 1922–23 and spent the rest of the 1920s in mid-table before finishing second-from-bottom in 1929–30. They left the league at the end of the 1931–32 season, dropping into the Walsall & District League and changing their name to Bilston Borough.

Their first season back in the Walsall & District League saw Bilston win the league title, a feat they repeated in 1935–36, before finishing the 1937–38 season as runners-up. After disbanding in 1939 due to World War II, the club was reformed in 1946 under the name Bilston. Rejoining the renamed Walsall Senior, they were champions in 1947–48, after which they rejoined the Birmingham Combination in 1948, finishing second-from-bottom of the league in 1950–51. They were runners-up in 1953–54, the last season before the league merged into the Birmingham & District League, with Bilston placed in the Northern Division. An eighth-place finish in 1954–55 saw the club placed in Division One the following season. However, after finishing in the bottom four, they were relegated to Division Two.

The Division Two title was won at the first attempt, securing Bilston an immediate promotion back to Division One. The league was reduced to a single division in 1960 and the club were champions in 1960–61. In 1962 the league was renamed the West Midlands (Regional) League, and when it gained a second division in 1965, Bilston were placed in the Premier Division. In 1968–69 the club reached the first round of the FA Cup for the first time, losing 3–1 at home to Halifax Town. After finishing as Premier Division runners-up in 1970–71, the 1972–73 season saw Bilston reach the second round of the FA Cup, as well as winning the Premier Division title and the Premier Division Cup; in the FA Cup they defeated Barnstaple Town 2–0 in the first round, before losing 1–0 at home to Barnet in a second round replay.

Bilston were Premier Division runners-up the following season and again in 1975–76. Despite finishing bottom of the division in 1979–80 they avoided relegation to Division One. The club was renamed Bilston Town in 1983. They were Premier Division runners-up in 1984–85, earning promotion to the Midland Division of the Southern League. The division was renamed the Western Division in 1999, with the club missing out on promotion to the Premier Division by two points in 2000–01. They finished seventeenth the following season, after which the club resigned from the league, dropping into Division One North of the West Midlands Regional League.

The 2002–03 season saw Bilston finish as runners-up in Division One North, after which they were switched to Division One South for the 2003–04 season, and then to Division One in 2004–05 amid league reorganisation. Despite finishing seventh in 2006–07 the club resigned from the league, but after reforming as Bilston Town (2007) they were readmitted to the league and placed in Division Two. The club were Division Two runners up in 2007–08 and promoted to Division One. After finishing as Division One runners-up in 2012–13, earning promotion to the Premier Division. In July 2017 the club were awarded the Queen's Award for Voluntary Service.

At the end of the 2020–21 season Bilston were transferred to Division One of the Midland League when the Premier Division of the West Midlands (Regional) League lost its status as a step six division. They were transferred to Division One South of the North West Counties League at the end of the 2025–26 season.

== Ground ==
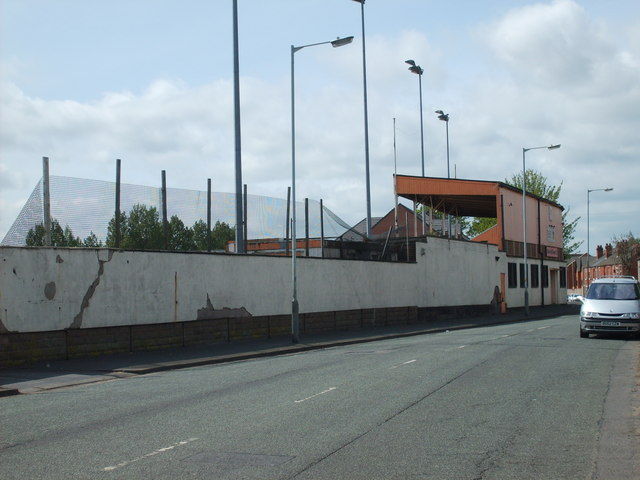
The exterior of the Queen Street ground

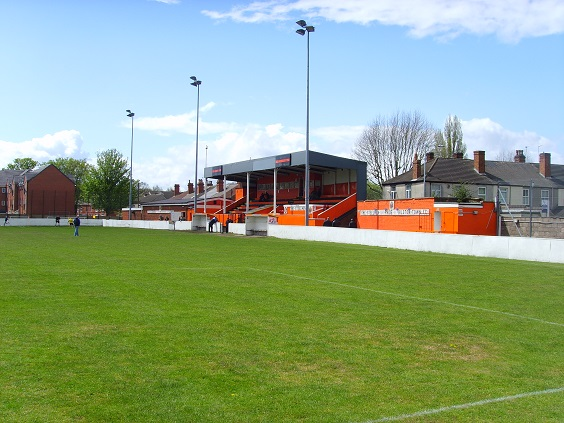
Queen Street Main Stand

Early in the club's history they played at Prouds Lane, using the nearby Spread Eagle pub as their changing room. They moved to Queen Street after in 1919, with the opening game played against Tamworth Castle in the FA Cup, with Bilston winning 1–0. Floodlights were installed in 1953 and were first used for a match against Wolverhampton Wanderers on 10 March 1953, with a record attendance of 8,000 seeing Wolves win 4–2. The ground's record attendance for a competitive game was set in 1968–69 for the FA Cup first round match against Halifax Town, when 4,300 spectators attended the game.

After over 120 attacks by vandals in five years, the ground was closed in 2007 after it was deemed to be unsafe, with the club having to play on an unenclosed pitch at Bantock park. In 2008 plans were announced to refurbish and reopen the ground, Work was complete ready for the 2008–09 season, with the club signing a 99-year lease.

The Queen Street ground has also been used by Bustleholme, Dudley Town (who shared the ground for a season in the mid-1980s after subsidence caused by old mineworkings led to the closure of their ground), Wolverhampton Wanderers Reserves, Wolverhampton Wanderers Women and Willenhall Town.

== Honours ==
Bilston players pictured in 1901 with the six trophies they won that season

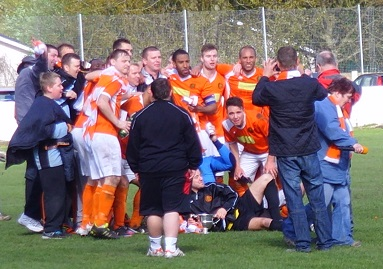
Bilston Town players celebrate beating Haughmond 4–1 to gain promotion to the WM(R)L Premier Division in May 2013

- West Midlands (Regional) League
  - Champions 1960–61, 1972–73
  - Division Two champions 1956–57
  - Premier Division League Cup winners 1972–73
  - Division One League Cup winners 2003–04
- Walsall & District League
  - Champions 1895–96, 1900–01, 1901–02, 1932–33, 1935–36, 1947–48
- Staffordshire Senior Cup
  - Winners 1957–58, 1959–60, 1960–61, 1961–62, 1997–98
- Staffordshire Junior Cup
  - Winners 1905–06
- Staffordshire FA Challenge Cup
  - Winners 1921–22, 2002–03
- Walsall Senior Cup
  - Winners 1968–69, 1971–72, 1972–73
- Bilston Charity Cup
  - Winners 1900–01, 1913–14
- Birmingham Junior Cup
  - Winners 1895–96
- John Martin Trophy
  - Winners 2009–10 (joint), 2010–11, 2013–14 (joint)
- Rugeley Charity Cup
  - Winners 1966–67
- Smedley Crooke Memorial Charity Cup
  - Winners 2017–18
- Staffordshire Junior Cup
  - Winners 1900–01
- Walsall Charity Cup
  - Winners 1901–02
- Walsall Hospital Cup
  - Winners 1900–01, 1901–02
- Walsall Junior/Challenge Cup
  - Winners 1900–01, 1905–06, 1932–34 (shared), 1934–35, 1935–36, 1946–47, 1947–48, 1948–49
- Wednesbury Charity Cup
  - Winners 1980–81, 1981–82, 1982–83, 1984–85
- Willenhall Nursing Institute Cup
  - Winners 1908–09
- Wolverhampton Charity Cup
  - Winners 1895–96, 1899–1900, 1900–01, 1903–04

== Records ==
- Best FA Cup performance: Second round, 1972–73
- Best FA Trophy performance: Fourth round, 2000–01
- Best FA Vase performance: Quarter-finals, 1992–93
- Biggest win: 12–0 vs Norton Wood, 15 February 1936
- Heaviest defeat: 19–1 vs Worcester City, 21 November 1931
- Record attendance: 8,000 vs Wolverhampton Wanderers, friendly match, 10 March 1953

== See also ==
- Bilston Town F.C. players
- Bilston Town F.C. managers
