= Wolverhampton United F.C. =

Association football club in England

Coordinates: 52°36′24.43″N 2°05′27.19″W

Wolverhampton United
- Full name: Wolverhampton United Football Club
- Founded: 1976
- Dissolved: 2019
- Ground: Prestwood Road West, Wednesfield
Home colours

Wolverhampton United Football Club was a football club based in Wolverhampton, England. Established in 1976 by a merger of Oxley and Whitmore Old Boys, they played at Prestwood Road West in the Wednesfield area of the city. The club folded in 2019.

== History ==
=== Oxley ===
Oxley joined Division One of the West Midlands (Regional) League in 1968. They finished bottom of Division One in 1975–76 and were due to be relegated to Division One B.

=== Whitmore Old Boys ===
Whitmore Old Boys joined Division Two of the Worcestershire Combination in 1967 and were champions in their first season in the league, earning promotion to Division One, with the league renamed the Midland Combination for the 1968–69 season. They finished bottom of Division One in 1970–71 and were relegated back to Division Two. The club were runners-up in Division Two in 1972–73, but were not promoted. They went on to win the Division Two title in 1974–75 and 1975–76, but were not promoted to Division One.

=== Wolverhampton United ===
In 1976 the two clubs merged to form Wolverhampton United. The merged club took Oxley's place in Division One B of the West Midlands Regional League. Their first season saw them win the JW Hunt Cup, beating Groveland 1–0 in the final. They also won the Division One B title, earning promotion to Division One. After finishing as runners-up in Division One in 1981–82 the club were promoted to the Premier Division. After finishing second-from-bottom of the Premier Division in 1987–88 they were relegated back to Division One.

United were Division One runners-up in 1995–96, earning promotion to the Premier Division. However, they finished bottom of the division in 1998–99 and were relegated to Division One North. After finishing as runners-up in Division One North in 1999–2000, the club won the division the following season and were promoted back to the Premier Division. Despite not finishing in the relegation zone, they were demoted to Division One at the end of the 2003–04 season.

After finishing bottom of Division One in 2013–14 United were relegated to Division Two. They were Division Two runners-up in 2017–18 but were not promoted. The club folded at the end of the 2018–19 season.

== Ground ==
The club played at Prestwood Road West. A wooden stand was built in 1982. After being promoted to the Premier Division of the West Midlands (Regional) League in 1996 they played at Darlaston Town's City Road ground due to the lack of floodlights at Prestwood Road West.

== Honours ==
=== Whitmore Old Boys ===
- Midland Combination
  - Division Two champions 1967–68, 1974–75, 1975–76

=== Wolverhamption United ===
- West Midlands (Regional) League
  - Division One B champions 1976–77
  - Division One North champions 2000–01
- JW Hunt Cup
  - Winners 1976–77

== Records ==
- Best FA Vase performance: Fourth round, 1982–83
