= Willenhall Town F.C. =

Association football club in England

Coordinates: 52°36′22″N 2°05′01″W

Willenhall Town
- Full name: Willenhall Town Football Club
- Nicknames: The Lockmen, The Reds, Red Army
- Founded: 1953
- Ground: Lane Head FC, Somerfield Road, Leamore, Bloxwich
- Manager: Matthew Fisher
- 2022–23: West Midlands (Regional) League Division One (withdrew)
Home colours

Willenhall Town Football Club are a football club based in Willenhall, West Midlands, England, who last played in the West Midlands (Regional) League.

== History ==
Willenhall Town was formed in 1953 by the amalgamation of two local sides, Aston Road Villa and R.A.F. Association. The club played in the Wolverhampton League from their formation until 1968, when they joined the Staffordshire County League (South). In 1975 they joined the West Midlands (Regional) League. They quickly won promotion to the Premier Division and then claimed the Premier Division title in 1979, pipping Lye Town to the title on goal difference. In 1981 they reached the FA Vase final at Wembley Stadium but lost to Whickham, and a year later gained promotion into the Southern Football League Midland Division. In the 1983–84 season the Reds won the title, scoring 100 goals in the process, and gained promotion to the Southern League Premier Division.

Although they finished 4th in the Premier Division in their first season, after that their performances declined until they were relegated back to the West Midlands (Regional) League in 1991. In 1994, however, the club became founder members of the new Midland Football Alliance where they were consistent mid-table finishers until the 2003–04 season when an impressive late season run saw them finish second and gain promotion to the Northern Premier League Division One.

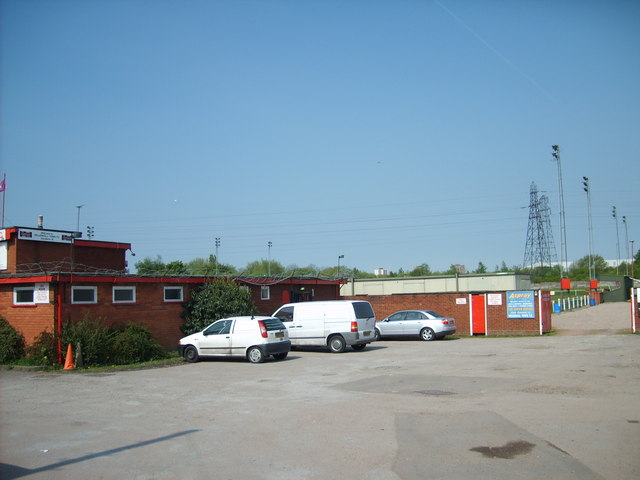
The club's former home ground, Noose Lane

In their very first season in the Northern Premier League the Reds made it into the promotion play-offs but were defeated. At the end of the 2004–05 season, Willenhall were switched to the Southern League Division One West, and in 2006 they were moved once again to the newly re-organised Division One Midlands. In 2006 manager Rob Smith and assistant manager Larry Chambers left the club for the position of managing AFC Telford United. Mel Eves was appointed as the new manager of Willenhall shortly afterwards.

At the end of the 2006–07 season Willenhall went to the play-off final to face Bromsgrove Rovers. While the game ended 1–1 after ninety minutes, extra time saw Bromsgrove score an extra goal and gain promotion. In November 2007, Eves left the club and the first team managing duties fell to Dean Edwards for the remainder of the season. With two games remaining in the 2007–08 season, however, Edwards also parted company with the Lockmen and chairman Paul Garner and Tony Smith took charge for the last two games, winning both, against Barton Rovers and Woodford United.

In May 2008 Garner announced the appointment of Shaun Cunnington as manager. Cunnington previously managed Alvechurch in the Midland Football Alliance and when he moved to the Lockmen he was joined by his assistant manager Paul Tomlinson and later by former Coventry City goalkeeper Tim Clarke as goalkeeping coach.

In May 2009 the club underwent a period of financial unrest when it was announced the club was selling its ground to Sporting Khalsa. However, later that month the club announced that chairman Paul Garner was leaving the club. In November 2009, Shaun Cunnington and assistant manager, Paul Tomlinson left the club. The committee then appointed Steve Pomroy and Micky Rawlings as their replacements. During an uncertain period at the club, relegation to the Midland Football Alliance was confirmed for the 2010–11 season. After finishing bottom of the Midland Football Alliance in the 2011–12 season, Willenhall Town became fan-run and were relegated to the West Midlands (Regional) League Premier Division. They finished in 20th place for 2012–13 season and played their last match at Noose Lane against Bromyard Town on 7 May 2013, moving to Long Lane Park, Long Lane, Essington for the 2013–14 season. Willenhall appointed Joe Ball as player-manager for the start of the 2017–18 season and after a 15-game winning streak and 17 league goals to his name, was subsequently replaced by Mark Cox.

== Club records ==
- Best league performance: 4th in Southern League Premier Division, 1984–85
- Best FA Cup performance: 1st round proper, 1981–82
- Best FA Trophy performance: 3rd round, 2004–05
- Best FA Vase performance: Final, 1980–81
