= Bloxwich Strollers F.C. =

Bloxwich Strollers
- Founded: 1881; 1948 (reformed)
- Dissolved: 1998
- Ground: The Old Red Lion Ground, Bloxwich

Bloxwich Strollers Football Club is a defunct football club that was based in Bloxwich, West Midlands, England.

== History ==
Although records show the club was existed as early as 1881, little is known of its early history. The first records of success show the club beating Bournville 2-1 in the final of the 1899–00 Saturday Amateur Cup, organised by Birmingham County Football Association. In 1927–28, Strollers won the Walsall Senior Cup, and were runners-up in both 1929–30 and 1930–31.

By 1952, the club had joined the Birmingham and District League, finishing in 14th place in their first season. Their second season in the league saw them faring even worse, finishing 22nd out of twenty-four teams. Strollers competed in the Northern Division of the league during the 1954–55 season, finishing bottom out of twenty teams. This was also the first of two seasons the Strollers played in the FA Cup, beating Sutton Town 3–0 away in the preliminary round before falling 6–1 at Burton Albion in the first qualifying round. The following season, 1955–56, Strollers took Moor Green to a replay after a 2–2 away draw, but lost the rematch 2–0 at home. The club resigned their position in the league partway through the season, and their record was expunged.

By 1985, the club had reformed as Little Bloxwich Strollers, and applied to join Division Two of the Midland Combination. They finished 5th in their first season, and were promoted to Division One. Before the start of the 1986–87 season, Little Bloxwich Strollers dropped the first word from their name and became simply Bloxwich Strollers again.

In 1990–91, Strollers joined the West Midlands (Regional) League and were placed in Division Two, finishing 8th in their first season in the league. Following the 1992–93 season, Division Two disbanded, with fourteen teams leaving the league. Strollers, who had finished second, subsequently joined Division One. Their first season in the division (1993–94) saw them finish in 8th place, yet winning effective promotion to the Premier Division due to a number of existing Premier Division clubs choosing to leave.

Despite having effectively achieved two promotions in as many seasons, Strollers finished a respectable 9th in the Premier Division in 1994–95. Two years later, in 1996–97, the club was to achieve its highest league finish: 3rd place in the Premier Division, behind Stourport Swifts and league champions Wednesfield. The following season, 1997–98, Strollers finished 5th, but the club subsequently folded and left the league.
