= Brereton Social F.C. =

Association football club in England

Brereton Social
- Full name: Brereton Social Football Club
- Nickname: Social
- Founded: 1899
- Ground: Red Lion Ground, Brereton
- Chairman: Gary Deebank
- League: North West Counties League Division One South
- 2025–26: Staffordshire County Senior League Premier Division, 1st of 18 (promoted)
Home colours

Brereton Social Football Club is a football club based in Brereton in Rugeley, Staffordshire, England. The club are currently members of the North West Counties League Division One South and play at the Red Lion Ground.

== History ==
Brereton Social F.C. was formed in 1899. The team have spent three separate spells as members of the West Midlands (Regional) League. The first began in 1968–69 and lasted for twenty years. During that time they won promotion form Division One in 1971–72 but they never finished higher than fourth until they left the league during the 1987–88 season to join the Staffordshire County League (South).

They rejoined the West Midlands (Regional) League in 1995–96 and stayed in Division One North until the club folded in 1999. A year later the club was reformed and rejoined the league, finishing in second place in 2005–06 before being transferred sideways to the Midland Combination Premier Division. In 2008 the club was relegated to Division One. For the 2010–11 season, the team were initially members of the Midland Combination Division One, which sits at level 11 of the English football league system, but resigned on 28 August 2010.

== Ground ==
The Red Lion Ground has a club house with cover in front, a small stand and floodlighting.

== Supporters ==
The club normally averages around 50 spectators at a home match, although the visit of Heath Hayes in the 2007–08 season saw a crowd of 212, the highest of the season in the Premier Division.

== Honours ==
- West Midlands (Regional) League Division One
  - Champions 1970–71
  - Runners-up 1968–69, 1971–72, 2005–06

== Club records ==
- Best league position: 4th in West Midlands (Regional) League Premier Division, 1973–74, 1974–75, 1976–77, 1980–81
- Best FA Cup performance: 3rd qualifying round, 1978–79
- Best FA Trophy performance: 1st round proper, 1974–75
- Best FA Vase performance: 2nd round proper, 1985–86

== Honours ==
- Staffordshire FA Challenge Cup Runners Up 1949–50
- Staffordshire FA Challenge Cup Winners 1955–56
- Staffordshire FA Challenge Cup Winners 1961–62
- Staffordshire FA Challenge Cup Winners 1966–67
- Staffordshire FA Challenge Cup Winners 1967–68
- West Midlands (Regional) League League Cup - Winners 1969–70
- West Midlands (Regional) League Division One – Winners 1970–71
- West Midlands (Regional) League League Cup - Winners 1972–73
- West Midlands (Regional) League League Cup - Winners 1997–98
- Staffordshire FA Challenge Cup Winners 1997–98
- Staffordshire FA Challenge Cup Winners 2001–02
- Staffordshire Senior League Division 2 Runners up 2016–17
- Staffordshire Senior League, League Cup Winners 2016–17
- Staffordshire Senior League Division 1 Runners up 2017–18
