= Tipton Town F.C. =

Association football club in England

Tipton Town
- Full name: Tipton Town Football Club
- Nickname: Town
- Founded: 1948
- Ground: Tipton Sports Academy, Tipton
- Capacity: 1,000 (200 seated)
- Manager: Neil Perks
- League: West Midlands (Regional) League Premier Division
- 2024–25: West Midlands (Regional) League Premier Division, 3rd of 15
Home colours	Away colours

Tipton Town Football Club is a football club based in Tipton, West Midlands, England. They are currently members of the West Midlands (Regional) League Premier Division and play at the Tipton Sports Academy.

== History ==
The club was established in 1948 as Ocker Hill United. They joined the Wolverhampton and District Amateur League, before also entering the Handsworth League and the Wednesbury League. The club were Wednesbury League champions in 1949–50 and on three other occasions, as well as winning the Premier Division of the Wolverhampton and District Amateur League several times. In 1967 they adopted their current name and moved up to Division One of the West Midlands (Regional) League.

Tipton were Division One champions and Division One Cup winners in 1983–84, earning promotion to the Premier Division, However, after finishing bottom of the Premier Division in 1990–91, the club were relegated back to Division One. League reorganisation in 1996 saw the club moved into Division One South. In 1997–98 they were Division One South runners-up and were promoted back to the Premier Division. The club were Premier Division Cup winners in 1999–2000, and won the Birmingham Midweek Floodlit Cup in 2002–03. After finishing as runners-up in the Premier Division in 2003–04, they were league champions and Premier Division Cup winners the following season, resulting in promotion to the Midland Alliance.

In 2010–11 Tipton reached the first round of the FA Cup for the first time; starting in the extra-prelimarinary round, the club played eight qualifying matches (including two replays) to earn a first round tie away to League One club Carlisle United. The final qualifying match, a fourth qualifying round replay against Sheffield, saw the club set a new record attendance of 1,429. They went on to lose 6–0 to Carlisle.

Tipton were Midland Alliance runners-up in 2010–11. When the league merged with the Midland Combination to form the Midland League in 2014, the club were placed in the league's Premier Division. However, they finished second-from-bottom of the division in the league's inaugural season and were relegated to the Premier Division of the West Midlands (Regional) League. The following season saw them finish bottom of the Premier Division, resulting in relegation to Division One. In 2018–19 the club won the Birmingham County Saturday Vase, beating Enville Athletic 3–0 in the final.

== Ground ==
The club moved to the Tipton Sports Academy in 1971. Prior to the current record attendance set during the 2010–11 season, the previous record attendance of 1,100 was set for a match against Wolverhampton Wanderers on 1 August 1988, The club temporarily relocated to Oldbury United in the early 2000s when the Sports Academy was redeveloped.

== Honours ==
- West Midlands Regional League
  - Premier Division champions 2004–05
  - Division One champions 1983–84
  - Premier Division Cup winners 1999–2000, 2004–05
  - Division One Cup winners 1983–84
- Wednesbury League
  - Champions 1949–50
- Birmingham Midweek Floodlit Cup
  - Winners 2002–03
- Wednesbury Senior Cup
  - Winners 1975–76, 1976–77, 1980–81, 1995–96
- Birmingham County Saturday Vase
  - Winners 2018–19

== Records ==
- Best FA Cup performance: First round, 2010–11
- Best FA Vase performance: Fifth round, 2004–05
- Record attendance: 1,429 vs Sheffield, FA Cup fourth qualifying round replay, 2010–11

== See also ==
- Tipton Town F.C. players
- Tipton Town F.C. managers
