= Bustleholme F.C. =

Association football club in England

Coordinates: 52.54254°N 1.96267°W

Bustleholme
- Full name: Bustleholme Football Club
- Nickname: The B's
- Founded: 1975
- Ground: Ray Hall Lane, Great Barr
- Chairperson: Leon Judge
- Manager: Lee Fieldhouse
- League: Midland League Division One
- 2025–26: West Midlands (Regional) League Premier Division, 1st of 18 (promoted)
| Home colours | Away colours |

Bustleholme Football Club is a football club based in West Bromwich, West Midlands, England. They are currently members of the Midland League Division One and play at Ray Hall Lane in Great Barr.

== History ==
The club was established as a youth team in 1975 by parents of the players. In 1996 they joined Division One South of the West Midlands (Regional) League. After finishing as runners-up in their 1996–97, the club were promoted to the Premier Division. Despite finishing bottom of the Premier Division in 2007–08, the club were not relegated. This was repeated the following season.

In 2009–10 Bustleholme won the league's Premier Division Cup, beating AFC Wulfrunians 1–0 in the final. They avoided relegation again after finishing bottom of the Premier Division in 2012–13, but a second-from-bottom finish the following season saw the club relegated to Division One.

== Ground ==
The club groundshared at Queen Street in Bilston until 2007. They later moved to Tipton Town's Tipton Sports Academy Ground, before relocating to York Road (formerly the home ground of Oldbury United) in Rowley Regis in 2018. In 2024 the club moved to Ray Hall Lane in Great Barr, the headquarters of the Birmingham County FA.

== Honours ==
- West Midlands (Regional) League
  - Premier League Cup winners 2009–10

== Records ==
- Best FA Cup performance: Extra-preliminary round, 2011–12
- Best FA Vase performance: Third round, 2010–11
