= Boldmere Rangers F.C. =

Association football club in England

Coordinates: 52°30′38.380″N 2°3′0.641″W

Boldmere Rangers FC
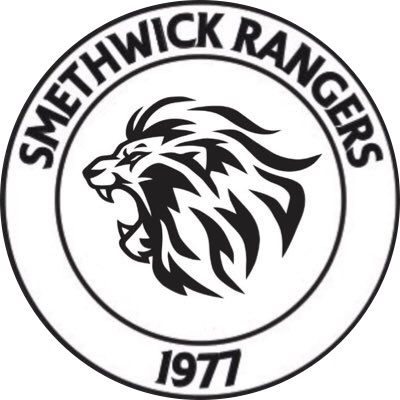
- Full name: Boldmere Rangers Football Club
- Nickname: Rangers
- Founded: 1977; 49 years ago
- Ground: Trevor Brown Memorial Ground, Boldmere
- Manager: Vacant
- League: Midland League Division One
- 2025–26: Midland League Division One, 18th of 21
- Website: https://www.smethwickrangersfc.co.uk/default.aspx
Home colours	Away colours

Boldmere Rangers Football Club is a football club based in Smethwick, West Midlands, England. They are members of the Midland League Division One and play at the Trevor Brown Memorial Ground in Boldmere, groundsharing with Boldmere St Michaels.

== History ==
The club first joined the West Midlands (Regional) League in 1996 under the name Smethwick Rangers, initially playing in Division One South. In their second season in the division, they were champions and were promoted to the Premier Division, where they remained until 2006.

In 2000, the club changed its name to Warley Rangers after signing a sponsorship deal with Warley Accident Repair Centre. In the same season, former Wolverhampton Wanderers player Robbie Dennison served as their player-coach.

In 2001, they reverted to their former name, but a year later, they changed their name again, this time to Smethwick Sikh Temple. As a predominantly Asian team, they have competed in the UK Asian Football Championships, and in 1994, they played at Villa Park in the final of the Aston Villa Cup, a tournament for local teams hosted by the Premier League club. In 2005, they reverted to the name Smethwick Rangers. After dropping out of the league in 2006, they re-surfaced in the Midland Football Combination in 2008, under the name Smethwick Town, and were subsequently known as AFC Internazionale and AFC Smethwick before reverting to their present name in 2013. In 2010, they switched back to the West Midlands (Regional) League and won promotion twice in three seasons to return to the Premier Division. In 2015, Smethwick Rangers were crowned UK Asian Champions after beating IGFC Singh Sabha Hounslow at Ibrox. In the 2015–16 season, Smethwick signed former Dinamo II București player Albert Alexandru, who led the club to the West Midlands (Regional) League Premier Division Cup, beating Wolverhampton Sporting Community 1–0 in the final at Long Lane Park. In the 2016–17 season, Smethwick finished runners-up in the West Midlands Regional League Premier Division Cup as they lost to league winners Haughmond 1–0.

For the 2017–18 season, the club changed its name once more, this time to Smethwick in an attempt to establish themselves as the number one club from the diverse area of Smethwick. They added Ahmed Ali a UEFA B Qualified coach and former Manchester United and England Schoolboy Stephen Cooke to the backroom staff. On 9 September 2017, Smethwick won their first ever game in the FA Vase beating Malvern Town 4–1, Joshua Small, Nathan Stone, Beni Kiembi, and Stuart Hillman scoring the goals.

In December 2018, Hayden Foote, former assistant manager at Bilston Town, was appointed manager alongside Darsh Ram. After a poor start to the season, Foote decided to depart and return to Bilston Town. Grant Joshua was appointed as first team manager with Chris Rabone and Ross Harris coming in as assistant managers. At the end of the 2020–21 season, the club were transferred to Division One of the Midland League when the Premier Division of the West Midlands (Regional) League lost its status as a step six division. In 2021, the club was once again renamed, this time to Smethwick Khalsa Football Federation with Manraj Singh Sucha appointed as manager in September, 7 games into the season and staying in charge until May 2023. The team finished the 2021–22 season in 13th position, only losing 3 games from January 2022 onwards. A year later, in summer 2022, the club reverted to the name Smethwick Rangers. In 2023, after playing home games at Tividale's The Beeches ground, the club announced a groundsharing agreement with Boldmere St Michaels to play home games at the Trevor Brown Memorial Ground in Boldmere. In 2026 the club was again renamed, this time to Boldmere Rangers.

== Club records ==
- Best league position: 5th in West Midlands (Regional) League Premier Division, 1998–99
- Best FA Cup performance: none
- Best FA Vase performance: First round proper, 2018–19 (as Smethwick)
