= Brierley Hill & Withymoor F.C. =

Brierley Hill & Withymoor
- Full name: Brierley Hill & Withymoor; Football Club
- Nickname(s): The Lions
- Founded: 1955 (as Oldwinsford)
- Dissolved: 2008
- Ground: The Grove; Halesowen; West Midlands (final home ground)
- 2007–08: West Midlands (Regional) League; Premier Division, 17th
Home colours	Away colours

Brierley Hill & Withymoor F.C. was a football club based in Halesowen, West Midlands, England. They were established in 1955, originally as Oldswinford F.C., and went through several subsequent name changes, but folded in 2008.

== History ==
The club was founded in 1955 under the name Oldswinford F.C., and it was under this name that they first joined the West Midlands (Regional) League in 1975. In 1993 they changed their name to Brierley Hill Town, and under this name they were founder members of the Midland Football Alliance in 1994. Their first season in that league saw them finish bottom, having won just three times all season, and they returned to the West Midlands League.

In 2001, financial difficulties led to them merging with West Hagley F.C. of the Midland Football Combination to form Brierley & Hagley F.C., initially ground-sharing with Halesowen Harriers. After that club's demise they shared The Sports Ground with Lye Town, and later used Halesowen Town's The Grove as their home venue. The club hoped to develop their Wassell Grove land into a new stadium, but these plans came to nothing as the club was wound up in 2008 after the resignation of the club's main funder, chairman Stephen Lea.

== Club records ==
- Best league position: 20th in Midland Football Alliance, 1994–95
- Best FA Cup performance: 1st qualifying round, 1984–85 and 1985–86 (as Oldswinford F.C.), 2007–08
- Best FA Vase performance: 1st round on several occasions, most recently in 2001–02

== Sources ==
- Brierley & Hagley at the Football Club History Database
