= Bromyard Town F.C. =

Association football club in England

Coordinates: 52°11′31.01″N 2°29′48.32″W

Bromyard Town
- Full name: Bromyard Town Football Club
- Founded: 1893
- Ground: Delahay Meadow, Bromyard
- Chairman: Richard Greenhall
- Manager: Jordan Lewis
- League: Hellenic League Division One
- 2025–26: Herefordshire League Premier Division, 1st of 14 (promoted)
Home colours	Away colours

Bromyard Town Football Club is a football club based in Bromyard, Herefordshire, England. They are currently members of the Hellenic League Division One and play at Delahay Meadow.

== History ==
The club was established in 1893. They were founder members of the Herefordshire League and were champions in 1946–47 and 1947–48. In 1995 the club moved up to Division One of the West Midlands (Regional) League. Following league reorganisation, they were placed in Division One South for the 1996–97 season, and in 1999–2000 they were Division One South champions, earning promotion to the Premier Division. In 2002 they won the Smedley Crooke Memorial Cup, beating Shirley Town 3–2 in the final.

Bromyard were relegated back to Division One after finishing bottom of the Premier Division in 2013–14, but won Division One the following season to secure an immediate return to the Premier Division. However, they were relegated again at the end of the 2015–16 season, having finished second-from-bottom of the Premier Division.

In 2025–26 Bromyard were champions of the Herefordshire League Premier Division.

== Ground ==
After playing at Broadbridge, the club purchased land at Delahay Meadow in 1986 to build a new ground, which was officially opened in 1994. Floodlights were installed in 1999.

== Honours ==
- West Midlands (Regional) League
  - Division One champions 2014–15
  - Division One South champions 1999–2000
- Herefordshire League
  - Champions 1946–47, 1947–48, 2025–26

== Records ==
- Best FA Cup performance: Preliminary round, 2007–08, 2009–10
- Best FA Vase performance: Second round, 2001–02

== See also ==
- Bromyard Town F.C. players
