= Lye Town F.C. =

Association football club in England

Coordinates: 52°27′23.94″N 2°07′12.25″W

Lye Town
- Full name: Lye Town Football Club
- Nickname: The Flyers
- Founded: 1930
- Ground: The Sports Ground, Lye
- Chairman: Brian Blakemore
- Manager: Richard Ball
- League: Midland League Premier Division
- 2024–25: Northern Premier League Division One Midlands, 20th of 21 (relegated)
- Website: www.lyetownfc.net
Home colours

Lye Town Football Club is a football club based in the Black Country town of Lye, Stourbridge, West Midlands, England. They are currently members of the Midland League Premier Division and play at the Sports Ground.

== History ==
The club was established in 1930 as Lye & Wollescote Amateur Football Club and joined the Worcestershire Combination. They were renamed Lye Town the following year. The club were runners-up in the Worcestershire Combination in 1932–33 and won the Birmingham Junior Cup the following season. They were league runners-up again in 1934–35 before winning the league in 1935–36. They were runners-up in the Worcestershire Combination for a third time in 1937–38, also winning the Birmingham Junior Cup, retaining the Cup the following season.

Following World War II Lye played in the Central Amateur League in the 1946–47 season before joining the Birmingham & District League in 1947. They were placed in the South Division when the league was reorganised in 1954, with a tenth-place finish seeing them placed in Division One for the 1955–56 season. They subsequently finished bottom of the Division and were relegated to Division Two. The league reverted to a single division in 1960 and was renamed the West Midlands (Regional) League in 1962.

The league gained a second division in 1965, with Lye becoming members of the Premier Division. Despite finishing bottom of the Premier Division in 1965–66 and 1966–67, the club were not relegated to Division One. They were Premier Division runners-up in 1976–77 before finishing second in three consecutive seasons between 1978–79 and 1980–81. In 1997–98 the club were Premier Division champions, but were not promoted to the Midland Alliance.

In 2010–11 Lye won the Birmingham Midweek Floodlit Cup, beating Nuneaton Griff 1–0 in the final. They were Premier Division runners-up in 2012–13 and won the Floodlit Cup for a second time with a 2–1 win over Southam United in the final. The club went on to win both the Worcestershire Senior Urn and the Premier Division the following season, earning promotion to the Premier Division of the newly formed Midland League. In the 2021–22 season Lye won the JW Hunt Cup.

== Ground ==
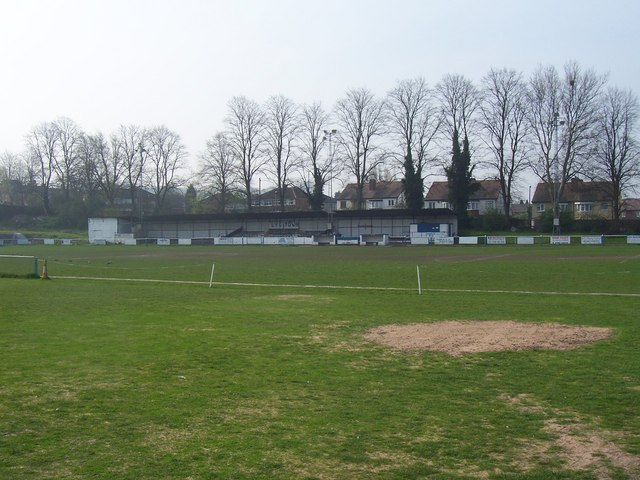
The Sports Ground, Lye

The club play at the Sports Ground on Stourbridge Road, which is shared with the local cricket club; a temporary rail is erected on the northern side of the pitch during the football season. A seated stand was built at the Stourbridge Road end after World War II. A new stand was built on the southern side of the pitch in 1971, with the seats from the post-war stand later moved into the newer stand when the older stand was demolished. A covered standing area with a barrel roof was built behind one goal.

== Honours ==
- West Midlands (Regional) League
  - Premier Division champions 1997–98, 2013–14
- Worcestershire Combination
  - Champions 1935–36
- Worcestershire Senior Urn
  - Winners 2013–14
- Birmingham Midweek Floodlit Cup
  - Winners 2010–11, 2012–13
- Birmingham Junior Cup
  - Winners 1933–34, 1937–38, 1938–39
- J W Hunt Cup
  - Winners 2021–22

== Records ==
- Best FA Cup performance: Third qualifying round, 1979–80, 1986–87, 1989–90
- Best FA Trophy performance: Third qualifying round, 1975–76, 1979–80
- Best FA Vase performance: Fourth round, 1995–96, 2018–19
- Record appearances: Andy Crannage, 415 (1986–1997); Mark Bache, 376 (1999–2007)
- Record goal scorer: Nathan Thomas, 109 goals in 121 appearances (1995–1998)

== See also ==
- Lye Town F.C. players
