= 1992–93 West Midlands (Regional) League =

The 1992–93 West Midlands (Regional) League season was the 93rd in the history of the West Midlands (Regional) League, an English association football competition for semi-professional and amateur teams based in the West Midlands county, Shropshire, Herefordshire, Worcestershire and southern Staffordshire.

== Premier Division ==
West Midlands League Premier Division
- Season: 1992–93
- Champions: Oldbury United
- Matches: 342
- Goals: 1,125 (3.29 per match)

The Premier Division featured 17 clubs which competed in the division last season, along with two new clubs:

- Alvechurch, relegated from the Southern Football League
- Ilkeston Town, promoted from Division One

=== League table ===
| Pos | Team | Pld | W | D | L | GF | GA | GD | Pts | Promotion or relegation |
|---|---|---|---|---|---|---|---|---|---|---|
| 1 | Oldbury United | 36 | 24 | 8 | 4 | 90 | 39 | +51 | 80 | |
| 2 | Chasetown | 36 | 23 | 11 | 2 | 56 | 28 | +28 | 80 | |
| 3 | Paget Rangers | 36 | 21 | 7 | 8 | 84 | 54 | +30 | 70 | |
| 4 | Rocester | 36 | 20 | 9 | 7 | 71 | 41 | +30 | 69 | |
| 5 | Stourport Swifts | 36 | 19 | 9 | 8 | 69 | 38 | +31 | 66 | |
| 6 | Ilkeston Town | 36 | 19 | 8 | 9 | 73 | 38 | +35 | 65 | |
| 7 | Rushall Olympic | 36 | 17 | 7 | 12 | 61 | 53 | +8 | 58 | |
| 8 | Wednesfield | 36 | 14 | 10 | 12 | 58 | 47 | +11 | 52 | |
| 9 | Alvechurch | 36 | 14 | 5 | 17 | 58 | 65 | −7 | 47 | Club folded |
| 10 | West Bromwich Town | 36 | 13 | 6 | 17 | 55 | 86 | −31 | 45 | |
| 11 | Pelsall Villa | 36 | 10 | 12 | 14 | 60 | 54 | +6 | 42 | |
| 12 | Blakenall | 36 | 9 | 13 | 14 | 57 | 75 | −18 | 40 | |
| 13 | Willenhall Town | 36 | 12 | 4 | 20 | 49 | 69 | −20 | 40 | |
| 14 | Hinckley Athletic | 36 | 11 | 6 | 19 | 56 | 68 | −12 | 39 | |
| 15 | Halesowen Harriers | 36 | 8 | 9 | 19 | 44 | 62 | −18 | 33 | |
| 16 | Cradley Town | 36 | 9 | 6 | 21 | 42 | 71 | −29 | 33 | |
| 17 | Oldswinford | 36 | 9 | 6 | 21 | 39 | 80 | −41 | 33 | |
| 18 | Westfields | 36 | 8 | 6 | 22 | 56 | 85 | −29 | 30 | |
| 19 | Lye Town | 36 | 7 | 8 | 21 | 47 | 72 | −25 | 29 | |

Source: nonleaguematters
Rules for classification: 1) points; 2) goal difference; 3) number of goals scored.

== Division One ==
West Midlands League Division One
- Season: 1992–93
- Champions: Knypersley Victoria
- Promoted: Knypersley Victoria; Darlaston

The Division One featured 17 clubs which competed in the division last season, along with 2 new clubs:

- Malvern Town, relegated from the Premier Division
- Gornal Sports, promoted from Division Two

=== League table ===
| Pos | Team | Pld | W | D | L | GF | GA | GD | Pts | Promotion or relegation |
|---|---|---|---|---|---|---|---|---|---|---|
| 1 | Knypersley Victoria | 36 | 26 | 3 | 7 | 105 | 34 | +71 | 81 | Promoted to the Premier Division |
| 2 | Darlaston | 36 | 25 | 6 | 5 | 69 | 27 | +42 | 81 | Promoted to the Premier Division |
| 3 | Lichfield | 36 | 23 | 6 | 7 | 75 | 42 | +33 | 75 | |
| 4 | Ettingshall Holy Trinity | 36 | 20 | 11 | 5 | 69 | 34 | +35 | 71 | |
| 5 | Gornal Athletic | 36 | 17 | 8 | 11 | 75 | 52 | +23 | 59 | |
| 6 | Cannock Chase | 36 | 16 | 4 | 16 | 50 | 59 | −9 | 52 | |
| 7 | Wolverhampton United | 36 | 14 | 7 | 15 | 60 | 69 | −9 | 49 | |
| 8 | Great Wyrley | 36 | 12 | 12 | 12 | 44 | 53 | −9 | 48 | |
| 9 | Tividale | 36 | 14 | 5 | 17 | 76 | 67 | +9 | 47 | |
| 10 | Hill Top Rangers | 36 | 13 | 8 | 15 | 58 | 62 | −4 | 47 | |
| 11 | Donnington Wood | 36 | 12 | 11 | 13 | 67 | 77 | −10 | 47 | |
| 12 | Malvern Town | 36 | 12 | 10 | 14 | 56 | 71 | −15 | 46 | |
| 13 | Oldbury United reserves | 36 | 10 | 13 | 13 | 52 | 67 | −15 | 43 | Resigned from the league |
| 14 | Moxley Rangers | 36 | 11 | 11 | 14 | 48 | 53 | −5 | 41 (Note: Moxley Rangers deducted 3 points.) | |
| 15 | Ludlow Town | 36 | 10 | 9 | 17 | 55 | 78 | −23 | 39 | |
| 16 | Wolverhampton Casuals | 36 | 11 | 5 | 20 | 57 | 72 | −15 | 38 | |
| 17 | Tipton Town | 36 | 9 | 11 | 16 | 42 | 63 | −21 | 38 | |
| 18 | Gornal Sports | 36 | 7 | 6 | 23 | 42 | 75 | −33 | 27 | |
| 19 | Wem Town | 36 | 4 | 6 | 26 | 39 | 84 | −45 | 18 | |

Source: nonleaguematters
Rules for classification: 1) points; 2) goal ratio; 3) number of goals scored.

== Division Two ==
West Midlands League Division Two
- Season: 1992–93
- Champions: Rushall Olympic reserves
- Promoted: Bloxwich Strollers; Manders; Cheslyn Hay

The Division Two featured 15 clubs which competed in the division last season, along with 2 new clubs:

- Hinckley Athletic reserves
- Tividale reserves

=== League table ===
| Pos | Team | Pld | W | D | L | GF | GA | GD | Pts | Promotion or relegation |
|---|---|---|---|---|---|---|---|---|---|---|
| 1 | Rushall Olympic reserves | 32 | 23 | 4 | 5 | 87 | 42 | +45 | 73 | Resigned from the league |
| 2 | Bloxwich Strollers | 32 | 23 | 2 | 7 | 99 | 39 | +60 | 71 | Promoted to Division One |
| 3 | Chasetown reserves | 32 | 21 | 5 | 6 | 81 | 28 | +53 | 68 | Resigned from the league |
| 4 | Rocester reserves | 32 | 20 | 6 | 6 | 104 | 49 | +55 | 66 | Resigned from the league |
| 5 | Manders | 32 | 20 | 5 | 7 | 83 | 40 | +43 | 65 | Promoted to Division One |
| 6 | Blackheath Electrodrives | 32 | 17 | 5 | 10 | 68 | 56 | +12 | 56 | Transferred to the Midland Combination |
| 7 | Mitchell & Butlers | 32 | 14 | 9 | 9 | 70 | 53 | +17 | 51 | Transferred to the Midland Combination |
| 8 | Hinckley Athletic reserves | 32 | 14 | 9 | 9 | 57 | 48 | +9 | 51 | Resigned from the league |
| 9 | Lye Town reserves | 32 | 14 | 5 | 13 | 61 | 71 | −10 | 47 | Resigned from the league |
| 10 | Albright & Wilson | 32 | 13 | 5 | 14 | 53 | 62 | −9 | 44 | Transferred to the Midland Combination |
| 11 | Oldswinford reserves | 32 | 10 | 4 | 18 | 40 | 67 | −27 | 34 | Resigned from the league |
| 12 | Halesowen Harriers reserves | 32 | 9 | 6 | 17 | 49 | 86 | −37 | 33 | Resigned from the league |
| 13 | Cradley Town reserves | 32 | 8 | 4 | 20 | 38 | 68 | −30 | 28 | Resigned from the league |
| 14 | Wolverhampton Casuals reserves | 32 | 7 | 5 | 20 | 44 | 87 | −43 | 26 | Resigned from the league |
| 15 | Park Rangers | 32 | 6 | 5 | 21 | 34 | 80 | −46 | 23 | Transferred to the Midland Combination |
| 16 | Cheslyn Hay | 32 | 4 | 6 | 22 | 44 | 87 | −43 | 18 | Promoted to Division One |
| 17 | Tividale reserves | 32 | 5 | 3 | 24 | 38 | 87 | −49 | 18 | Resigned from the league |

Source: nonleaguematters
Rules for classification: 1) points; 2) goal ratio; 3) number of goals scored.
