= 1993–94 West Midlands (Regional) League =

The 1993–94 West Midlands (Regional) League season was the 94th in the history of the West Midlands (Regional) League, an English association football competition for semi-professional and amateur teams based in the West Midlands county, Shropshire, Herefordshire, Worcestershire and southern Staffordshire.

At the end of the season Midland Football Alliance were to be created. Ten Premier Division clubs joined newly formed league along with Midland Football Combination clubs, while Ilkeston Town was the last club promoted from the West Midlands (Regional) League to the Southern Football League. Thus, the league became Midland Alliance feeder and downgraded to ninth level of the overall English football league system.

== Premier Division ==
West Midlands League Premier Division
- Season: 1993–94
- Champions: Ilkeston Town
- Promoted: Ilkeston Town
- Matches: 380
- Goals: 1,334 (3.51 per match)

The Premier Division featured 18 clubs which competed in the division last season, along with two new clubs promoted from Division One:

- Darlaston
- Knypersley Victoria

Also, Oldswinford changed name to Brierley Hill Town.

=== League table ===
| Pos | Team | Pld | W | D | L | GF | GA | GD | Pts | Promotion or relegation |
|---|---|---|---|---|---|---|---|---|---|---|
| 1 | Ilkeston Town | 38 | 25 | 6 | 7 | 102 | 43 | +59 | 81 | Promoted to the Southern League |
| 2 | Stourport Swifts | 38 | 24 | 7 | 7 | 83 | 37 | +46 | 79 | |
| 3 | Oldbury United | 38 | 23 | 9 | 6 | 85 | 42 | +43 | 78 | Joined the Midland Football Alliance |
| 4 | Blakenall | 38 | 23 | 8 | 7 | 78 | 45 | +33 | 77 | |
| 5 | Paget Rangers | 38 | 21 | 5 | 12 | 79 | 43 | +36 | 68 | Joined the Midland Football Alliance |
| 6 | Knypersley Victoria | 38 | 19 | 8 | 11 | 75 | 60 | +15 | 65 | Joined the Midland Football Alliance |
| 7 | Rocester | 38 | 20 | 4 | 14 | 83 | 63 | +20 | 64 | Joined the Midland Football Alliance |
| 8 | Hinckley Athletic | 38 | 18 | 7 | 13 | 77 | 58 | +19 | 61 | Joined the Midland Football Alliance |
| 9 | Chasetown | 38 | 18 | 6 | 14 | 51 | 57 | −6 | 60 | Joined the Midland Football Alliance |
| 10 | Pelsall Villa | 38 | 16 | 8 | 14 | 70 | 78 | −8 | 56 | |
| 11 | Willenhall Town | 38 | 15 | 8 | 15 | 73 | 60 | +13 | 53 | Joined the Midland Football Alliance |
| 12 | Wednesfield | 38 | 13 | 11 | 14 | 65 | 63 | +2 | 50 | |
| 13 | Halesowen Harriers | 38 | 15 | 5 | 18 | 63 | 66 | −3 | 50 | Joined the Midland Football Alliance |
| 14 | Darlaston | 38 | 12 | 12 | 14 | 61 | 74 | −13 | 48 | |
| 15 | Lye Town | 38 | 10 | 10 | 18 | 43 | 67 | −24 | 40 | |
| 16 | Brierley Hill Town | 38 | 11 | 5 | 22 | 56 | 83 | −27 | 38 | Joined the Midland Football Alliance |
| 17 | Rushall Olympic | 38 | 10 | 7 | 21 | 53 | 76 | −23 | 34 (Note: Rushall Olympic deducted three points.) | Joined the Midland Football Alliance |
| 18 | Westfields | 38 | 7 | 7 | 24 | 58 | 92 | −34 | 28 | |
| 19 | Cradley Town | 38 | 4 | 10 | 24 | 42 | 104 | −62 | 22 | |
| 20 | West Bromwich Town | 38 | 3 | 3 | 32 | 37 | 123 | −86 | 12 | Resigned from the league |

Source: nonleaguematters
Rules for classification: 1) points; 2) goal difference; 3) number of goals scored.

== Division One ==
West Midlands League Division One
- Season: 1993–94
- Champions: Stafford Town
- Promoted: Stafford Town; Gornal Athletic; Tividale; Ludlow Town; Walsall Wood; Bloxwich Strollers; Malvern Town; Ettingshall Holy Trinity; Hill Top Rangers; Manders; Bilston United

The Division One featured 16 clubs which competed in the division last season, along with 5 new clubs:

- Bloxwich Strollers, promoted from Division Two
- Cheslyn Hay, promoted from Division Two
- Manders, promoted from Division Two
- Stafford Town, joined from Staffordshire Senior League
- Walsall Wood, joined from Staffordshire Senior League

Also, Gornal Sports changed name to Bilston United.

=== League table ===
| Pos | Team | Pld | W | D | L | GF | GA | GD | Pts | Promotion or relegation |
|---|---|---|---|---|---|---|---|---|---|---|
| 1 | Stafford Town | 40 | 32 | 2 | 6 | 109 | 52 | +57 | 98 | Promoted to the Premier Division |
| 2 | Gornal Athletic | 40 | 30 | 4 | 6 | 92 | 35 | +57 | 94 | Promoted to the Premier Division |
| 3 | Tividale | 40 | 26 | 5 | 9 | 96 | 48 | +48 | 83 | Promoted to the Premier Division |
| 4 | Ludlow Town | 40 | 21 | 7 | 12 | 70 | 39 | +31 | 70 | Promoted to the Premier Division |
| 5 | Walsall Wood | 40 | 19 | 10 | 11 | 71 | 40 | +31 | 67 | Promoted to the Premier Division |
| 6 | Bloxwich Strollers | 40 | 20 | 3 | 17 | 101 | 68 | +33 | 63 | Promoted to the Premier Division |
| 7 | Wolverhampton United | 40 | 18 | 8 | 14 | 89 | 70 | +19 | 62 | |
| 8 | Tipton Town | 40 | 19 | 5 | 16 | 68 | 67 | +1 | 62 | |
| 9 | Malvern Town | 40 | 18 | 8 | 14 | 73 | 74 | −1 | 62 | Promoted to the Premier Division |
| 10 | Ettingshall Holy Trinity | 40 | 16 | 10 | 14 | 70 | 71 | −1 | 58 | Promoted to the Premier Division |
| 11 | Wolverhampton Casuals | 40 | 17 | 5 | 18 | 73 | 63 | +10 | 56 | |
| 12 | Hill Top Rangers | 40 | 14 | 11 | 15 | 66 | 72 | −6 | 53 | Promoted to the Premier Division |
| 13 | Lichfield | 40 | 14 | 12 | 14 | 66 | 60 | +6 | 50 (Note: Lichfield deducted 3 points.) | |
| 14 | Great Wyrley | 40 | 13 | 9 | 18 | 63 | 85 | −22 | 48 | |
| 15 | Cannock Chase | 40 | 12 | 11 | 17 | 60 | 84 | −24 | 47 | |
| 16 | Donnington Wood | 40 | 11 | 10 | 19 | 50 | 54 | −4 | 43 | Resigned from the league |
| 17 | Manders | 40 | 11 | 10 | 19 | 54 | 70 | −16 | 43 | Promoted to the Premier Division |
| 18 | Bilston United | 40 | 11 | 10 | 19 | 54 | 91 | −37 | 43 | Promoted to the Premier Division |
| 19 | Moxley Rangers | 40 | 8 | 5 | 27 | 47 | 81 | −34 | 29 | |
| 20 | Wem Town | 40 | 8 | 5 | 27 | 46 | 116 | −70 | 29 | |
| 21 | Cheslyn Hay | 40 | 5 | 4 | 31 | 32 | 110 | −78 | 19 | Transferred to the Midland Combination |

Source: nonleaguematters
Rules for classification: 1) points; 2) goal ratio; 3) number of goals scored.
