= 1995–96 West Midlands (Regional) League =

The 1995–96 West Midlands (Regional) League season was the 96th in the history of the West Midlands (Regional) League, an English association football competition for semi-professional and amateur teams based in the West Midlands county, Shropshire, Herefordshire, Worcestershire and southern Staffordshire.

== Premier Division ==
West Midlands League Premier Division
- Season: 1995–96
- Champions: Wednesfield
- Promoted: Pelsall Villa
- Matches: 342
- Goals: 1,196 (3.5 per match)

The Premier Division featured 16 clubs which competed in the division last season, along with three new clubs:

- Brierley Hill Town, relegated from the Midland Football Alliance
- Lichfield City, promoted from Division One
- Wolverhampton Casuals, promoted from Division One

=== League table ===
Pos	Team	Pld	W	D	L	GF	GA	GD	Pts	Promotion or relegation
1	Wednesfield	36	28	6	2	95	30	+65	90	
2	Pelsall Villa	36	27	5	4	97	30	+67	86	Promoted to the Midland Football Alliance
3	Lye Town	36	20	11	5	80	34	+46	71	
4	Stafford Town	36	19	10	7	79	35	+44	67	
5	Stourport Swifts	36	19	10	7	74	50	+24	67	
6	Bloxwich Strollers	36	17	9	10	67	50	+17	60	
7	Walsall Wood	36	16	8	12	61	42	+19	56	
8	Westfields	36	16	6	14	86	73	+13	54	
9	Gornal Athletic	36	16	6	14	54	42	+12	54	
10	Ludlow Town	36	14	9	13	68	71	−3	51	
11	Ettingshall Holy Trinity	36	11	9	16	62	80	−18	42	
12	Tividale	36	11	8	17	65	79	−14	41	
13	Lichfield City	36	9	10	17	43	65	−22	37	Resigned from the league
14	Malvern Town	36	9	9	18	34	67	−33	36	
15	Brierley Hill Town	36	10	4	22	49	73	−24	34	
16	Cradley Town	36	8	7	21	55	82	−27	31	
17	Wolverhampton Casuals	36	9	4	23	53	108	−55	31	
18	Darlaston	36	5	11	20	40	86	−46	26	
19	Hill Top Rangers	36	4	6	26	34	99	−65	18	

Source: nonleaguematters
Rules for classification: 1) points; 2) goal difference; 3) number of goals scored.

== Division One ==
West Midlands League Division One
- Season: 1995–96
- Champions: Goodyear
- Promoted: Wolverhampton United

The Division One featured 14 clubs which competed in the division last season, along with 7 new clubs:

- Bilston United, relegated from the Premier Division
- Bandon
- Brereton Social
- Bromyard Town
- Mahal
- Pershore Town reserves
- Sikh Hunters

=== League table ===
Pos	Team	Pld	W	D	L	GF	GA	GD	Pts	Promotion or relegation
1	Goodyear	40	27	6	7	110	45	+65	87	Resigned from the league
2	Wolverhampton United	40	27	3	10	85	50	+35	84	Promoted to the Premier Division
3	Rocester reserves	40	24	10	6	109	46	+63	82	Resigned from the league
4	Morda United	40	26	4	10	87	54	+33	82	Allocated to Division One North
5	Chasetown reserves	40	23	6	11	92	69	+23	75	Allocated to Division One North
6	Bandon	40	22	7	11	94	57	+37	73	Allocated to Division One South
7	Tipton Town	40	21	10	9	78	42	+36	73	Allocated to Division One South
8	Rushall Olympic reserves	40	21	4	15	98	70	+28	64 (Note: Rushall Olympic reserves deducted 3 points.)	Allocated to Division One North
9	Bilston United	40	17	10	13	92	84	+8	61	Allocated to Division One South
10	Brereton Social	40	14	12	14	66	62	+4	54	Allocated to Division One North
11	Moxley Rangers	40	16	8	16	70	64	+6	53 (Note: Moxley Rangers deducted 3 points.)	Resigned from the league
12	Bromyard Town	40	16	5	19	70	67	+3	53	Allocated to Division One South
13	Hinckley Athletic reserves	40	15	4	21	71	84	−13	49	Resigned from the league
14	Gornal Athletic reserves	40	13	5	22	42	91	−49	44	Allocated to Division One South
15	Great Wyrley	40	13	4	23	55	103	−48	43	Allocated to Division One North
16	Mahal	40	12	6	22	61	89	−28	42	Allocated to Division One South
17	Oldbury United reserves	40	11	7	22	68	87	−19	40	Allocated to Division One South
18	Pershore Town reserves	40	10	7	23	47	82	−35	37	Allocated to Division One South
19	Tividale reserves	40	10	6	24	51	92	−41	36	Allocated to Division One South
20	Cannock Chase	40	7	9	24	54	97	−43	30	Allocated to Division One North
21	Sikh Hunters	40	6	5	29	50	115	−65	20 (Note: Sikh Hunters deducted 3 points.)	Allocated to Division One North

Source: nonleaguematters
Rules for classification: 1) points; 2) goal ratio; 3) number of goals scored.
