= 1994–95 West Midlands (Regional) League =

The 1994–95 West Midlands (Regional) League season was the 95th in the history of the West Midlands (Regional) League, an English association football competition for semi-professional and amateur teams based in the West Midlands county, Shropshire, Herefordshire, Worcestershire and southern Staffordshire.

At the end of the previous season Midland Football Alliance was created. Ten Premier Division clubs joined newly formed league, while their places was taken by Division One clubs.

== Premier Division ==
West Midlands League Premier Division
- Season: 1994–95
- Champions: Pelsall Villa
- Promoted: Blakenall
- Relegated: Bilston United
- Matches: 342
- Goals: 1,197 (3.5 per match)

The Premier Division featured eight clubs which competed in the division last season, along with eleven new clubs, promoted from Division One:

- Bilston United
- Bloxwich Strollers
- Ettingshall Holy Trinity
- Gornal Athletic
- Hill Top Rangers
- Ludlow Town
- Malvern Town
- Manders
- Stafford Town
- Tividale
- Walsall Wood

=== League table ===
Pos	Team	Pld	W	D	L	GF	GA	GD	Pts	Promotion or relegation
1	Pelsall Villa	36	28	3	5	83	31	+52	87	
2	Blakenall	36	27	4	5	101	23	+78	85	Promoted to the Midland Football Alliance
3	Stourport Swifts	36	25	7	4	91	29	+62	82	
4	Stafford Town	36	21	5	10	87	52	+35	68	
5	Westfields	36	19	6	11	76	55	+21	63	
6	Walsall Wood	36	18	8	10	84	57	+27	62	
7	Darlaston	36	17	5	14	71	61	+10	56	
8	Wednesfield	36	15	5	16	63	68	−5	50	
9	Bloxwich Strollers	36	15	5	16	50	60	−10	50	
10	Lye Town	36	15	4	17	67	59	+8	49	
11	Gornal Athletic	36	12	10	14	53	54	−1	46	
12	Manders	36	13	6	17	58	83	−25	45	Resigned from the league
13	Ludlow Town	36	10	14	12	43	52	−9	44	
14	Tividale	36	12	4	20	45	69	−24	40	
15	Cradley Town	36	11	7	18	46	71	−25	37 (Note: Cradley Town deducted three points.)	
16	Ettingshall Holy Trinity	36	9	6	21	62	80	−18	33	
17	Hill Top Rangers	36	8	4	24	46	98	−52	28	
18	Bilston United	36	6	5	25	40	106	−66	23	Relegated to Division One
19	Malvern Town	36	5	4	27	31	89	−58	19	

Source: nonleaguematters
Rules for classification: 1) points; 2) goal difference; 3) number of goals scored.

== Division One ==
West Midlands League Division One
- Season: 1994–95
- Champions: Wolverhampton Casuals
- Promoted: Wolverhampton Casuals; Lichfield City

The Division One featured 8 clubs which competed in the division last season, along with 12 new clubs:

- Morda United, joined from Mid Wales Football League
- Rocester reserves
- Rushall Olympic reserves
- Goodyear
- Chasetown reserves
- Pelsall Villa reserves
- Hinckley Athletic reserves
- Oldbury United reserves
- Tividale reserves
- Gornal Athletic reserves
- Cradley Town reserves
- Darlaston reserves

Also, Lichfield changed name to Lichfield City.

=== League table ===
Pos	Team	Pld	W	D	L	GF	GA	GD	Pts	Promotion or relegation
1	Wolverhampton Casuals	38	29	2	7	126	53	+73	89	Promoted to the Premier Division
2	Lichfield City	38	25	6	7	107	37	+70	81	Promoted to the Premier Division
3	Morda United	38	24	4	10	92	45	+47	76	
4	Wem Town	38	20	5	13	69	60	+9	65	Resigned from the league
5	Moxley Rangers	38	20	4	14	85	73	+12	64	
6	Rocester reserves	38	18	10	10	91	66	+25	61 (Note: Rocester reserves deducted 3 points.)	
7	Rushall Olympic reserves	38	18	6	14	65	65	0	60	
8	Tipton Town	38	18	5	15	80	52	+28	59	
9	Goodyear	38	17	8	13	81	68	+13	59	
10	Great Wyrley	38	15	11	12	85	56	+29	56	
11	Chasetown reserves	38	15	11	12	73	59	+14	56	
12	Pelsall Villa reserves	38	13	11	14	74	80	−6	50	Resigned from the league
13	Hinckley Athletic reserves	38	14	6	18	97	99	−2	48	
14	Oldbury United reserves	38	14	7	17	77	71	+6	46 (Note: Oldbury United reserves deducted 3 points.)	
15	Wolverhampton United	38	12	9	17	71	95	−24	45	
16	Tividale reserves	38	10	10	18	45	67	−22	39 (Note: Tividale reserves deducted 1 point.)	
17	Cannock Chase	38	10	7	21	57	98	−41	37	
18	Gornal Athletic reserves	38	7	10	21	49	91	−42	31	
19	Cradley Town reserves	38	8	5	25	57	93	−36	29	Resigned from the league
20	Darlaston reserves	38	3	3	32	31	184	−153	12	Resigned from the league

Source: nonleaguematters
Rules for classification: 1) points; 2) goal ratio; 3) number of goals scored.
