= Walsall Senior Cup =

- Organiser(s): Walsall & District FA
- Founded: 1878; 148 years ago
- Region: Staffordshire
- Teams: 13 (2025–26)
- Current champions: Chasetown
- Website: Walsall Senior Cup

The Walsall and District Football Association Senior Cup is an English football competition for clubs in and around Walsall, with the final in modern times taking place at Walsall's Bescot Stadium.

The Cup was founded in 1878 and was originally named the Licensed Victuallers Cup with nine sides competing. Walsall Swifts won the inaugural competition. The current holders are Chasetown, who beat Stafford Rangers in a penalty shoot-out on 12 May 2026.

== Early history ==
Walsall Swifts, who later amalgamated into the modern Walsall, won the first Cup in 1878, upon winning the trophy for the third time in the first four editions they were awarded the trophy outright and a new silver trophy was made in 1882. That trophy became known as the Walsall Senior Cup.

Records from before 1946 are sparse, however wins by some notable sides are recorded. Aston Villa Reserves won the competition in 1899 and 1903. Birmingham City won the trophy in 1883, 1901, and 1904.

== Finals ==
=== Key ===
*	Match went to a replay
†	Match went to extra time
§	Match decided by a penalty shootout after extra time
‡	Shared trophy

=== Finals ===
Season	Winners	Result	Runner-up	Notes	Ref(s)
1878–79	Walsall Swifts	5–2	Walsall White Star		
1879–80	Walsall Swifts	1–0	Walsall White Star		
1880–81	Walsall Swifts	4–0	Walsall White Star		
1881–82	Walsall Swifts	3–2	Elwell's		
1882–83	Small Heath Alliance	4–1	Wednesbury Old Athletic	The first trophy won by Small Heath Alliance, later to be called Birmingham City	
1883–84	Walsall Swifts	4–2	Stafford Road	The first season in which Walsall Town entered the competition	
1884–85	Walsall Town	3–1	Wednesbury Old Athletic		
1885–86	Walsall Town	1–0	Walsall Swifts	Swifts originally succeeded in a protest with regard to spectator encroachment, but the decision was later overturned on appeal.	
1886–87	Walsall Town	3–0	Wolverhampton Wanderers	Replay. First match ended 1–1.	
1887–88	West Bromwich Albion reserves	4–1	Walsall Swifts	Last game for Walsall Swifts; the merger with Walsall Town had taken place two months earlier.	
1888–89	Walsall Town Swifts	walkover	Small Heath	The Walsall FA ordered the final to take place on 27 April 1889, but Small Heath was already engaged in the Warwickshire Cup semi-finals, and the trophy was awarded to the Town Swifts	
1889–90	Walsall Town Swifts	7–1	Hednesford Town		
1890–91	Walsall Town Swifts	3–1	Wednesbury Old Athletic		
1891–92	Wednesbury Old Athletic	2–0	Wellington St George's		
1892–93	Walsall Town				
1893–94	Walsall Town				
1894–95	Wellington St George's				
1895–96	Wolverhampton Wanderers				
1896–97	Wellington Town	4–1	Wellington St George's		
1897–98	Wolverhampton Wanderers				
1898–99	Wolverhampton Wanderers				
1899–1900	Wolverhampton Wanderers reserves	1–0	Hinckley Town		
1900–01	Small Heath reserves West Bromwich Albion reserves	1–1 ‡		Trophy shared	
1901–02	Stoke				
1902–03					
1903–04	Small Heath reserves	5–0 *	West Bromwich Albion reserves	Replay. First match ended 0–0.	
1904–05	Stoke				
1905–06	Wolverhampton Wanderers reserves	4–0 *	Burslem Port Vale reserves	Replay. First match drawn.	
1906–07					
1907–08					
1908–09	Walsall				
1909–10	Walsall				
1910–11	Cannock Town				
1911–12	Walsall				
1912–13	Walsall				
1913–14					
1914–1919	No competition due to World War I				
1919–20	Bilston United				
1920–21	Talbot Steed				
1921–22	Stafford Rangers				
1922–23	Walsall Wood				
1923–24	Shrewsbury Town				
1924–25	Shrewsbury Town				
1925–26	Shrewsbury Town				
1926–27	Walsall				
1927–28	Bloxwich Strollers				
1928–29	Hednesford Town				
1929–30	West Cannock Colliery	2–1	Bloxwich Strollers		
1930–31	Cannock Chase Colliery	3–2	Bloxwich Strollers		
1931–32	Cannock Chase Colliery	4–2	Short Heath United		
1932–33	Bilston	1–1 *	Walsall Wood	Replay. First match 1–1.	
1933–34					
1934–35	Cannock Chase Colliery	2–2	Walsall Wood		
1935–36	Cannock Chase Colliery	2–1	Wrockwardine Wood		
1936–37	Cannock Chase Colliery	3–1	Wrockwardine Wood		
1937–38	Cannock Chase Colliery	5–0	English Electric		
1938–39	Cannock Chase Colliery	2–2	Sutton Coldfield Town		
1939–40	Cannock Chase Colliery	9–0	Rugeley St Andrew's		
1940–45	No competition due to World War II				
1945–46	Walsall Wood	7–2	Rugley WMC		
1946–47	Bilston Town	3–2	Walsall Trinity		
1947–48	Bilston Town	2–0	Halesowen		
1948–49	Bilston Town	1–0	Oswestry Town		
1949–50	Brereton Social 2–2 Walsall Wood. Replay result unknown.				
1950–51	Bloxwich Strollers	1–0 †	Ogley Hay	After extra time	
1951–52	Walsall Wood	1–0	Walsall Trinity		
1952–53	Walsall Wood	1–0 †	Ogley Hay	After extra time	
1953–54	Shelfield Athletic	1–0	Lower Gornal Athletic		
1954–55	Shelfield Athletic	5–1	Walsall Trinity		
1955–56	Shelfield Athletic	2–0	Ogley Hay		
1956–57	Walsall Trinity	3–1	Walsall Wood		
1957–58	Walsall Wood	3–0	Stourbridge		
1958–59	Shelfield Athletic	4–0	Walsall Wood		
1959–60	Shelfield Athletic	3–0	Walsall Wood		
1960–61	Walsall Wood	7–0	Rugeley Villa		
1961–62	Walsall Wood	5–1	Blakenall		
1962–63	Armitage	2–1	Blakenall		
1963–64	Blakenall	3–0	Hednesford		
1964–65	Rushall Olympic	2–1	Brereton Social		
1965–66	Lower Gornal Athletic	4–2 †	Kidderminster Harriers	After extra time	
1966–67	Wrockwardine Wood	2–1 *	Rushall Olympic	Replay. First match ended 2–2. After extra time.	
1967–68	Wrockwardine Wood	2–1	Tamworth		
1968–69	Bilston	2–1	Lichfield		
1969–70	Atherstone Town	4–3	Wrockwardine Wood	Aggregate score. 1st leg: 2–2, 2nd leg: 2–1.	
1970–71	Baddesley Colliery	4–3	Atherstone Town	Aggregate score. 1st leg: 1–2, 2nd leg: 3–1.	
1971–72	Bilston	4–1 *	Brereton Social	Second replay. First match 2–2. Replay 2–2. After extra time.	
1972–73	Bilston	1–0	Darlaston		
1973–74	Brereton Social	3–2 †	Warley County Borough	After extra time	
1974–75	Blakenall	2–1	Armitage		
1975–76	Blakenall	1–0	Hednesford		
1976–77	Blakenall	1–0 *	Bilston	Replay. First match ended 0–0. After extra time	
1977–78	Sutton Coldfield Town	2–0	Alvechurch		
1978–79	Sutton Coldfield Town	1–0	Great Wyrley		
1979–80	Sutton Coldfield Town	1–0	Rushall Olympic		
1980–81	Blakenall	2–1 *	Sutton Coldfield Town	Replay. First match ended 1–1. After extra time.	
1981–82	Oldbury United	5–0 *	Walsall Wood	Replay. First match ended 2–2. After extra time.	
1982–83	Coleshill Town	4–3	Wolverhampton United		
1983–84	Atherstone Town	4–0	Tividale		
1984–85	Harrisons	2–0	Wolverhampton United		
1985–86	Paget Rangers	3–1	Wolverhampton Casuals		
1986–87	Boldmere St. Michaels	2–0	Bloxwich AFC		
1987–88	Redgate United	1–0 †	Chasetown	After extra time	
1988–89	Blakenall	1–0	Rushall Olympic		
1989–90	Meir K.A.	2–1 *	Rushall Olympic	Replay. First match ended 0–0. After extra time.	
1990–91	Chasetown	1–0 †	Blakenall	After extra time	
1991–92	Armitage 90	3–2 †	Meir K.A.	After extra time	
1992–93	Chasetown	3–1	Pelsall Villa		
1993–94	Newcastle Town	1–0 †	Oldbury United	After extra time	
1994–95	Newcastle Town	1–1 §	Knypersley	Newcastle Town won on penalties. After extra time.	
1995–96	Blakenall	0–0	Newcastle Town	Blakenall won on penalties. After extra time.	
1996–97	Blakenall	1–1 §	Bloxwich	Blakenall won on penalties. After extra time.	
1997–98	Blakenall	2–1	Halesowen Harriers		
1998–99	Blakenall	3–2	Meir K.A.		
1999–2000	Rushall Olympic	2–2 §	Rocester	Rocester won 5–4 on penalties. After extra time.	
2000–01	Wolverhampton Casuals	2–0	Sutton Coldfield Town		
2001–02	Bolehall Swifts	4–4 §	Tividale	Bolehall Swifts won 4–3 on penalties. After extra time.	
2002–03	Tividale	1–0 †	Rocester	After extra time	
2003–04	Sutton Coldfield Town	3–1	Tividale		
2004–05	Chasetown	2–1	Tividale		
2005–06	Boldmere St. Michaels	1–0	Tipton Town		
2006–07	Boldmere St. Michaels	3–1	Goodrich		
2007–08	Boldmere St. Michaels	2–0	Heath Hayes		
2008–09	Rushall Olympic	2–1	Tipton Town		
2009–10	Bloxwich United	1–0	Rushall Olympic		
2010–11	Rushall Olympic	3–0	Ellesmere Rangers		
2011–12	Rushall Olympic	3–0	Brocton		
2012–13	Stafford Rangers	2–1	Walsall		
2013–14	Chasetown	4–1	Rushall Olympic		
2014–15	Walsall	4–3 †	Chasetown	After extra time	
2015–16	Rushall Olympic				
2016–17	Walsall	3–1	Stafford Rangers		
2017–18	Rushall Olympic	2–2 §	Walsall Wood	Rushall Olympic won 4–3 on penalties. After extra time.	
2018–19	Boldmere St. Michaels	2–0	Sutton Coldfield Town		
2019–20	Competition abandoned due to COVID-19 pandemic				
2020–21	Competition not held due to COVID-19 pandemic				
2021–22	Rushall Olympic	2–0	Sporting Khalsa		
2022–23	Rushall Olympic	3–1	Walsall		
2023–24	Rushall Olympic	4–1	Chasetown		
2024–25	Coleshill Town	3–1	Darlaston Town		
2025–26	Chasetown	2–2 §	Stafford Rangers	Chasetown won 5-4 on penalties. No extra time played.	
