= 1994–95 Midland Football Alliance =

Midland Football Alliance
- Season: 1994–95
- Champions: Paget Rangers
- Promoted: Paget Rangers
- Relegated: Brierley Hill Town
- Matches: 380
- Goals: 1,199 (3.16 per match)

The 1994–95 Midland Football Alliance season was the first in the history of Midland Football Alliance, a football competition in England.

The league was formed, drawing its initial membership from the strongest clubs in the Midland Football Combination and the West Midlands (Regional) League, both of which became feeder leagues to the new competition.

== Clubs ==
The league featured 20 clubs which competed in the Midland Football Combination and the West Midlands (Regional) League last season.

Ten clubs joined from the Midland Football Combination:

- Barwell
- Bolehall Swifts
- Boldmere St. Michaels
- Pershore Town
- Sandwell Borough
- Shepshed Albion, who also changed name to Shepshed Dynamo
- Shifnal Town
- Stapenhill
- Stratford Town
- West Midlands Police

Ten clubs joined from the West Midlands (Regional) League:

- Brierley Hill Town
- Chasetown
- Halesowen Harriers
- Hinckley Athletic
- Knypersley Victoria
- Oldbury United
- Paget Rangers
- Rocester
- Rushall Olympic
- Willenhall Town

== League table ==
Pos	Team	Pld	W	D	L	GF	GA	GD	Pts	Promotion or relegation
1	Paget Rangers	38	24	9	5	65	32	+33	81	Promoted to the Southern Football League
2	Hinckley Athletic	38	20	9	9	76	49	+27	69	
3	Stratford Town	38	19	9	10	69	46	+23	66	
4	Shepshed Dynamo	38	18	10	10	63	51	+12	64	
5	Halesowen Harriers	38	19	6	13	87	55	+32	63	
6	Shifnal Town	38	16	14	8	65	45	+20	62	
7	Boldmere St. Michaels	38	18	8	12	65	48	+17	62	
8	Oldbury United	38	18	8	12	58	47	+11	62	
9	Knypersley Victoria	38	15	12	11	82	54	+28	57	
10	Willenhall Town	38	15	7	16	55	58	−3	52	
11	West Midlands Police	38	14	8	16	53	51	+2	50	
12	Stapenhill	38	15	5	18	60	80	−20	50	
13	Rocester	38	12	12	14	48	50	−2	48	
14	Sandwell Borough	38	12	12	14	62	69	−7	48	
15	Barwell	38	12	9	17	58	69	−11	45	
16	Pershore Town	38	12	9	17	49	71	−22	45	
17	Chasetown	38	8	13	17	52	72	−20	37	
18	Rushall Olympic	38	9	10	19	60	85	−25	37	
19	Bolehall Swifts	38	9	9	20	45	60	−15	36	
20	Brierley Hill Town	38	3	5	30	27	107	−80	14	Relegated to the West Midlands (Regional) League

Source: fchd
Rules for classification: 1) points; 2) goal difference; 3) number of goals scored.
