= List of Rushall Olympic F.C. seasons =

Rushall Olympic Football Club is an English football club based in Rushall, a former mining village that forms part of the Metropolitan Borough of Walsall. The team competes in the Southern League Premier Division Central, the sixth tier of the English football league system.

== Early history ==
Although football had been played in the village for at least 20 years previously, the earliest known reference to Rushall Olympic Football Club is in local newspaper reports on matches from the 1893–94 season. The club joined the Cannock & District League in 1895, finishing as runners-up in their first season and later joined the Junior (where they were champions in 1903–04), Amateur, Parks and Senior sections of the Walsall & District League. During the inter-war years, the team won a number of local honours. At this time, the team comprised mainly local colliery workers and played on a field behind the Miners Arms pub in Rushall and changed in the pub itself. However, some time prior to the Second World War, the club disbanded. In 1951, a group of local young men decided to re-form the club. They approached the proprietor of a local fish and chip shop for permission to use his premises as their headquarters and secured the use of Rowley Place as a home ground. The club joined the Walsall & District Amateur League, where the team won the Second Division championship in 1952–53, and later the First Division championship in 1955–56, after which they gained promotion to the Staffordshire County League (South), where they won the Second Division title at the first attempt. Following promotion to the First Division, the club won four championship titles between 1960 and 1965. In 1975, in a bid to gain a higher league status, the club decided to move three miles away to the Aston University Sports Ground, just off the main A34 Walsall to Birmingham road. Meanwhile, the club obtained the lease on some land in Daw End, Rushall, and the new Dales Lane ground was officially opened on 14 August 1977.

== Key ==
Key to league record

- Level = Level of the league in the current league system
- Pld = Games played
- W = Games won
- D = Games drawn
- L = Games lost
- GF = Goals for
- GA = Goals against
- GD = Goals difference
- Pts = Points
- Position = Position in the final league table
- Top scorer and number of goals scored shown in bold when he was also top scorer for the division.

Key to cup records

- Res = Final reached round
- Rec = Final club record in the form of wins-draws-losses
- PR = Preliminary round
- QR1 (2, etc.) = Qualifying Cup rounds
- G = Group stage
- R1 (2, etc.) = Proper Cup rounds
- QF = Quarter-finalists
- SF = Semi-finalists
- F = Finalists
- A(QF,SF,F) = Area quarter-, semi-, finalists
- W = Winners

== Seasons ==
| Year | League | | | | | | | | | | | | | | Cup competitions | | | | | | Manager |
| Year | Division | Lvl | Pld | W | D | L | GF | GA | GD | Pts | Position | Leading league scorer | | Average attendance | FA Cup | | FA Trophy | | FA Vase | | Manager |
| Year | Division | Lvl | Pld | W | D | L | GF | GA | GD | Pts | Position | Name | Goals | Average attendance | Res | Rec | Res | Rec | Res | Rec | Manager |
|---|---|---|---|---|---|---|---|---|---|---|---|---|---|---|---|---|---|---|---|---|---|
Joined the West Midlands (Regional) League from the Staffordshire League
| 1978–79 | **West Midlands (Regional) League Division One** | | 34 | 21 | 6 | 7 | 70 | 37 | +33 | 48 | 4th of 18 | | | | — | | — | | — | | |
| 1979–80 | **West Midlands (Regional) League Division One** | | 36 | 28 | 5 | 3 | 79 | 17 | +62 | 61 | 1st of 19 | | | | — | | — | | — | | |
| 1980–81 | **West Midlands (Regional) League Premier Division** | | 42 | 15 | 13 | 14 | 50 | 52 | -2 | 43 | 12th of 22 | | | | — | | — | | PR | 0-0-1 | |
| 1981–82 | **West Midlands (Regional) League Premier Division** | | 42 | 16 | 18 | 8 | 72 | 54 | +18 | 50 | 6th of 22 | | | | PR | 0-1-1 | — | | PR | 0-0-1 | |
| 1982–83 | **West Midlands (Regional) League Premier Division** | | 38 | 12 | 8 | 18 | 59 | 66 | -7 | 32 | 14th of 20 | | | | PR | 1-1-1 | — | | R2 | 2-1-1 | |
| 1983–84 | **West Midlands (Regional) League Premier Division** | | 38 | 11 | 11 | 16 | 55 | 59 | -4 | 33 | 13th of 20 | | | | QR1 | 0-1-1 | — | | R1 | 1-0-1 | |
| 1984–85 | **West Midlands (Regional) League Premier Division** | | 38 | 12 | 10 | 16 | 57 | 58 | -1 | 34 | 13th of 20 | | | | QR1 | 0-0-1 | — | | R4 | 4-1-1 | |
| 1985–86 | **West Midlands (Regional) League Premier Division** | | 38 | 14 | 9 | 15 | 63 | 65 | -2 | 37 | 11th of 20 | | | | PR | 1-1-1 | — | | PR | 0-0-1 | |
| 1986–87 | **West Midlands (Regional) League Premier Division** | | 38 | 13 | 8 | 17 | 60 | 63 | -3 | 34 | 12th of 20 | | | | PR | 0-0-1 | — | | R2 | 2-1-1 | |
| 1987–88 | **West Midlands (Regional) League Premier Division** | | 34 | 13 | 7 | 14 | 43 | 44 | -1 | 33 | 9th of 18 | | | | PR | 1-1-1 | — | | R2 | 2-1-1 | |
| 1988–89 | **West Midlands (Regional) League Premier Division** | | 40 | 22 | 11 | 7 | 73 | 39 | +34 | 77 | 5th of 21 | | | | QR2 | 2-0-1 | — | | PR | 0-0-1 | |
| 1989–90 | **West Midlands (Regional) League Premier Division** | | 40 | 15 | 5 | 20 | 65 | 56 | +9 | 50 | 14th of 21 | | | | QR1 | 1-1-1 | — | | PR | 0-0-1 | |
| 1990–91 | **West Midlands (Regional) League Premier Division** | | 42 | 17 | 12 | 13 | 67 | 51 | +16 | 63 | 12th of 22 | | | | QR1 | 1-1-1 | — | | R3 | 3-0-1 | |
| 1991–92 | **West Midlands (Regional) League Premier Division** | | 36 | 16 | 9 | 11 | 61 | 38 | +23 | 57 | 8th of 19 | | | | PR | 0-0-1 | — | | — | | |
| 1992–93 | **West Midlands (Regional) League Premier Division** | | 36 | 17 | 7 | 12 | 61 | 53 | +8 | 58 | 7th of 19 | | | | QR3 | 3-3-1 | — | | PR | 0-0-1 | |
| 1993–94 | **West Midlands (Regional) League Premier Division** | | 38 | 10 | 7 | 21 | 53 | 76 | -23 | 34 (Note: Three points deducted) | 17th of 20 | | | | PR | 0-0-1 | — | | R1 | 1-1-1 | |
Midland Football Alliance created. Club transferred to the newly created league.
| 1994–95 | **Midland Football Alliance** | 8 | 38 | 9 | 10 | 19 | 60 | 85 | -25 | 37 | 18th of 20 | | | | PR | 0-0-1 | — | | PR | 0-0-1 | |
| 1995–96 | **Midland Football Alliance** | 8 | 36 | 15 | 5 | 16 | 56 | 65 | -9 | 46 (Note: Four points deducted) | 12th of 19 | | | | PR | 0-0-1 | — | | R3 | 4-0-1 | |
| 1996–97 | **Midland Football Alliance** | 8 | 38 | 10 | 10 | 18 | 40 | 59 | -19 | 40 | 16th of 20 | | | | PR | 0-0-1 | — | | QR2 | 0-0-1 | |
| 1997–98 | **Midland Football Alliance** | 8 | 38 | 12 | 8 | 18 | 51 | 57 | -6 | 44 | 16th of 20 | | | | PR | 0-0-1 | — | | R1 | 1-0-1 | |
| 1998–99 | **Midland Football Alliance** | 8 | 36 | 16 | 10 | 12 | 57 | 44 | +13 | 58 | 7th of 20 | | | | PR | 0-0-1 | — | | R2 | 2-0-1 | |
| 1999–2000 | **Midland Football Alliance** | 8 | 42 | 20 | 9 | 13 | 75 | 65 | +10 | 69 | 7th of 22 | | | | PR | 0-1-1 | — | | QR2 | 0-0-1 | |
| 2000–01 | **Midland Football Alliance** | 8 | 42 | 28 | 9 | 5 | 98 | 28 | +70 | 93 | 2nd of 22 | | | | PR | 0-0-1 | — | | R5 | 5-1-1 | |
| 2001–02 | **Midland Football Alliance** | 8 | 42 | 22 | 11 | 9 | 81 | 50 | +31 | 77 | 5th of 22 | | | | QR1 | 1-1-1 | — | | R4 | 2-0-1 | John Allen; Kevin Hadley |
| 2002–03 | **Midland Football Alliance** | 8 | 42 | 31 | 6 | 5 | 94 | 37 | +57 | 96 (Note: Three points deducted) | 2nd of 20 | | | | PR | 0-0-1 | — | | R3 | 1-0-1 | Kevin Hadley |
| 2003–04 | **Midland Football Alliance** | 8 | 46 | 15 | 16 | 15 | 58 | 55 | +3 | 61 | 14th of 24 | | | | PR | 0-0-1 | — | | R1 | 0-0-1 | John Allen |
| 2003–04 | **Midland Football Alliance** | 8 | Level of the league decreased after the Conference North and South creation. | | | | | | | | | | | | PR | 0-0-1 | — | | R1 | 0-0-1 | John Allen |
| 2004–05 | **Midland Football Alliance** | 9 | 42 | 27 | 7 | 8 | 88 | 44 | +44 | 88 | 1st of 22 | | | | QR2 | 2-0-1 | — | | QR2 | 0-0-1 | John Allen |
| 2005–06 | **Southern Football League**; **Western Division** | 8 | 42 | 17 | 11 | 14 | 73 | 57 | +16 | 62 | 10th of 22 | | | 116 | PR | 0-0-1 | QR2 | 1-0-1 | — | | John Allen |
| 2006–07 | **Southern Football League**; **Division One Midlands** | 8 | 42 | 15 | 9 | 18 | 56 | 55 | +1 | 54 | 15th of 22 | | | 120 | PR | 0-0-1 | QR2 | 2-1-1 | — | | John Allen |
| 2007–08 | **Southern Football League**; **Division One Midlands** | 8 | 40 | 23 | 7 | 10 | 68 | 23 | +45 | 76 | 5th of 21 | | | 152 | QR4 | 4-0-1 | QR3 | 2-1-1 | — | | Paul Holleran |
| 2007–08 | **Southern Football League**; **Division One Midlands** | 8 | Lost in the **play-off** semifinal | | | | | | | | | | | | QR4 | 4-0-1 | QR3 | 2-1-1 | — | | Paul Holleran |
| 2008–09 | **Northern Football League**; **Division One South** | 8 | 38 | 20 | 8 | 10 | 63 | 42 | +21 | 68 | 5th of 20 | | | 127 | PR | 0-0-1 | QR1 | 1-1-1 | — | | Paul Holleran |
| 2008–09 | **Northern Football League**; **Division One South** | 8 | Lost in the **play-off** semifinal | | | | | | | | | | | | PR | 0-0-1 | QR1 | 1-1-1 | — | | Paul Holleran |
| 2009–10 | **Northern Football League**; **Division One South** | 8 | 42 | 16 | 11 | 15 | 68 | 61 | +7 | 59 | 12th of 22 | | | 133 | QR1 | 1-0-1 | QR1 | 0-0-1 | — | | Neil Kitching |
| 2010–11 | **Northern Football League**; **Division One South** | 8 | 42 | 26 | 3 | 13 | 78 | 45 | +33 | 81 | 3rd of 22 | | | 131 | PR | 0-1-1 | QR2 | 2-1-1 | — | | Neil Kitching |
| 2010–11 | **Northern Football League**; **Division One South** | 8 | Promoted after winning the **play-off** | | | | | | | | | | | | PR | 0-1-1 | QR2 | 2-1-1 | — | | Neil Kitching |
| 2011–12 | **Northern Premier League**; **Premier Division** | 7 | 42 | 17 | 10 | 15 | 52 | 51 | +1 | 61 | 8th of 22 | | | 300 | QR4 | 3-0-1 | QR1 | 0-0-1 | — | | Neil Kitching |
| 2012–13 | **Northern Premier League**; **Premier Division** | 7 | 42 | 20 | 10 | 12 | 69 | 55 | +14 | 70 | 6th of 22 | | | 254 | QR1 | 0-0-1 | R1 | 3-0-1 | — | | Neil Kitching |
| 2013–14 | **Northern Premier League**; **Premier Division** | 7 | 46 | 21 | 12 | 13 | 79 | 65 | +14 | 75 | 7th of 24 | | | 193 | QR4 | 2-0-2 | QR2 | 1-0-1 | — | | Neil Kitching |
| 2014–15 | **Northern Premier League**; **Premier Division** | 7 | 46 | 21 | 9 | 16 | 76 | 64 | +12 | 72 | 9th of 24 | | | 245 | QR2 | 1-0-1 | QR3 | 2-1-1 | — | | Richard Sneekes |
| 2015–16 | **Northern Premier League**; **Premier Division** | 7 | 46 | 19 | 12 | 15 | 74 | 61 | +13 | 69 | 10th of 24 | | | 259 | QR3 | 2-2-1 | QR2 | 1-1-1 | — | | Richard Sneekes |
| 2016–17 | **Northern Premier League**; **Premier Division** | 7 | 46 | 18 | 10 | 18 | 60 | 60 | 0 | 64 | 12th of 24 | | | 261 | QR2 | 1-1-1 | QR1 | 0-0-1 | — | | Trevor Burroughs; John Allen |
| 2017–18 | **Northern Premier League**; **Premier Division** | 7 | 46 | 19 | 9 | 18 | 73 | 79 | -6 | 66 | 8th of 24 | | | 245 | QR2 | 1-1-1 | QR2 | 1-0-1 | — | | Wayne Thomas; Liam McDonald |
| 2018–19 | **Southern Football League**; **Premier Division Central** | 7 | 42 | 17 | 11 | 14 | 56 | 49 | +7 | 62 | 8th of 22 | | | 247 | QR1 | 0-1-1 | QR1 | 0-0-1 | — | | Liam McDonald |
| 2019–20 | **Southern Football League**; **Premier Division Central** | 7 | 33 | 15 | 8 | 10 | 58 | 43 | +15 | 53 | 5th of 22 | | | 270 | QR3 | 2-0-1 | QR1 | 0-0-1 | — | | Liam McDonald |
| 2019–20 | **Southern Football League**; **Premier Division Central** | 7 | The season was declared null and void due to COVID-19 | | | | | | | | | | | | QR3 | 2-0-1 | QR1 | 0-0-1 | — | | Liam McDonald |
| 2020–21 | **Southern Football League**; **Premier Division Central** | 7 | 8 | 3 | 4 | 1 | 14 | 12 | +2 | 13 | 4th of 22 | | | – (Note: COVID-19 prevented fans from attending games) | QR1 | 0-1-0 | R1 | 1-0-1 | — | | Liam McDonald |
| 2020–21 | **Southern Football League**; **Premier Division Central** | 7 | The season was declared null and void due to COVID-19 | | | | | | | | | | | | QR1 | 0-1-0 | R1 | 1-0-1 | — | | Liam McDonald |
| 2021–22 | **Southern Football League**; **Premier Division Central** | 7 | 40 | 20 | 9 | 11 | 80 | 54 | +26 | 69 | 4th of 21 | | | 371 | QR2 | 1–1–1 | R1 | 1–0–1 | — | | Liam McDonald |
| 2021–22 | **Southern Football League**; **Premier Division Central** | 7 | Lost in the **play-off** semifinal | | | | | | | | | | | | QR2 | 1–1–1 | R1 | 1–0–1 | — | | Liam McDonald |
| 2022–23 | **Southern Football League**; **Premier Division Central** | 7 | 42 | 22 | 7 | 13 | 71 | 52 | +19 | 73 | 5th of 22 | | | 335 | QR1 | 0–0–1 | QR3 | 0–0–1 | — | | Liam McDonald |
| 2022–23 | **Southern Football League**; **Premier Division Central** | 7 | Promoted after winning the **play-off** | | | | | | | | | | | | QR1 | 0–0–1 | QR3 | 0–0–1 | — | | Liam McDonald |
| 2023–24 | **National League North** | 6 | 46 | 15 | 9 | 22 | 61 | 73 | -12 | 54 | 19th of 24 | Danny Waldron | 16 | 522 | QR3 | 1–0–1 | R2 | 0–0–1 | — | | Liam McDonald |
| 2024–25 | **National League North** | 6 | 46 | 9 | 8 | 29 | 42 | 98 | -56 | 35 | 22nd of 24 | Luke Benbow; Kian Ryley | 4 | 482 | R1 | 3–1–1 | R3 | 1–0–1 | — | | Adam Stevens; Richard Sneekes |

== Notes ==
- Rushall Olympic at the Football Club History Database
