= 1979–80 West Midlands (Regional) League =

The 1979–80 West Midlands (Regional) League season was the 80th in the history of the West Midlands (Regional) League, an English association football competition for semi-professional and amateur teams based in the West Midlands county, Shropshire, Herefordshire, Worcestershire and southern Staffordshire.

== Premier Division ==
West Midlands League Premier Division
- Season: 1979–80
- Champions: Sutton Coldfield Town
- Matches: 462
- Goals: 1,325 (2.87 per match)

The Premier Division featured all the 18 clubs which competed in the division last season, along with four new clubs.

- Clubs transferred from the Midland Football Combination:
  - Blakenall
  - Malvern Town
  - Sutton Coldfield Town
- Plus:
  - Shifnal Town, promoted from Division One

=== League table ===
Pos	Team	Pld	W	D	L	GF	GA	GD	Pts	Promotion or relegation
1	Sutton Coldfield Town	42	28	11	3	96	39	+57	67	
2	Lye Town	42	30	7	5	73	29	+44	67	
3	Willenhall Town	42	23	11	8	95	45	+50	57	
4	Hednesford Town	42	19	16	7	72	41	+31	54	
5	Brereton Social	42	20	11	11	86	45	+41	51	
6	Brierley Hill Alliance	42	20	11	11	62	49	+13	51	
7	Shifnal Town	42	19	10	13	72	53	+19	48	
8	Dudley Town	42	20	6	16	61	52	+9	46	
9	Coventry Sporting	42	16	10	16	64	67	−3	42	
10	Ledbury Town	42	13	15	14	62	71	−9	41	
11	Malvern Town	42	13	11	18	56	71	−15	37	
12	Halesowen Town	42	13	11	18	52	69	−17	37	
13	Hinckley Athletic	42	12	12	18	40	59	−19	36	
14	Tividale	42	13	9	20	70	75	−5	35	
15	Gresley Rovers	42	10	14	18	49	69	−20	34	
16	Armitage	42	12	9	21	39	55	−16	33	
17	VS Rugby	42	11	11	20	43	60	−17	33	
18	Blakenall	42	11	11	20	45	76	−31	33	
19	Wednesfield Social	42	10	12	20	44	66	−22	32	
20	Darlaston	42	9	13	20	42	86	−44	31	
21	Gornal Athletic	42	7	16	19	52	69	−17	30	Demoted to Division One
22	Bilston	42	8	13	21	50	79	−29	29	

Source: nonleaguematters
Rules for classification: 1) points; 2) goal difference; 3) number of goals scored.
