= 1978–79 West Midlands (Regional) League =

The 1978–79 West Midlands (Regional) League season was the 79th in the history of the West Midlands (Regional) League, an English association football competition for semi-professional and amateur teams based in the West Midlands county, Shropshire, Herefordshire, Worcestershire and southern Staffordshire.

== Premier Division ==
West Midlands League Premier Division
- Season: 1978–79
- Champions: Willenhall Town
- Matches: 306
- Goals: 857 (2.8 per match)

The Premier Division featured 16 clubs which competed in the division last season, along with two clubs promoted from Division One:

- Ledbury Town
- Wednesfield Social

Willenhall Town won the league, with second-place Lye Town tying them on points with 53 each.

=== League table ===
Pos	Team	Pld	W	D	L	GF	GA	GD	Pts
1	Willenhall Town	34	23	7	4	82	32	+50	53
2	Lye Town	34	21	11	2	62	33	+29	53
3	Dudley Town	34	21	8	5	53	23	+30	50
4	Hednesford Town	34	19	10	5	59	26	+33	48
5	Tividale	34	19	6	9	63	40	+23	44
6	Bilston	34	15	10	9	50	34	+16	40
7	Brierley Hill Alliance	34	17	5	12	67	47	+20	39
8	Brereton Social	34	17	5	12	48	40	+8	39
9	Darlaston	34	15	5	14	52	51	+1	35
10	Coventry Sporting	34	12	6	16	39	48	−9	30
11	Hinckley Athletic	34	12	5	17	42	52	−10	29
12	Ledbury Town	34	10	7	17	57	63	−6	27
13	VS Rugby	34	9	9	16	29	41	−12	27
14	Wednesfield Social	34	7	12	15	27	45	−18	26
15	Halesowen Town	34	8	8	18	35	55	−20	24
16	Armitage	34	7	6	21	44	69	−25	20
17	Gresley Rovers	34	4	7	23	27	67	−40	15
18	Gornal Athletic	34	4	5	25	21	91	−70	13

Source: nonleaguematters
Rules for classification: 1) points; 2) goal difference; 3) number of goals scored.
