= 1978–79 Midland Football Combination =

The 1978–79 Midland Football Combination season was the 42nd in the history of Midland Football Combination, a football competition in England at tier 7 of the English football league system. Sutton Coldfield Town won the championship. Sutton Coldfield Town, Blakenall, and Malvern Town transferred to the West Midlands (Regional) League for the 1979-80 season.

== Division One ==
Midland Football Combination Division One
- Season: 1978–79
- Champions: Sutton Coldfield Town
- Matches: 380
- Goals: 967 (2.54 per match)

Division One featured 19 clubs which competed in the division in the previous season along with one new club, promoted from Division Two:

- Walsall Wood

=== League table ===
Pos	Team	Pld	W	D	L	GF	GA	GD	Pts	Promotion or relegation
1	Sutton Coldfield Town	38	26	9	3	104	30	+74	61	Transferred to the West Midlands (Regional) League
2	Oldbury United	38	20	11	7	49	29	+20	51	
3	Bridgnorth Town	38	19	11	8	54	31	+23	49	
4	Boldmere St. Michaels	38	20	9	9	44	35	+9	49	
5	Walsall Sportsco	38	18	11	9	58	41	+17	47	
6	Blakenall	38	17	10	11	57	38	+19	44	Transferred to the West Midlands (Regional) League
7	Solihull Borough	38	18	8	12	59	46	+13	44	
8	Paget Rangers	38	16	10	12	50	41	+9	42	
9	Knowle	38	17	7	14	51	44	+7	41	
10	Mile Oak Rovers	38	15	10	13	42	37	+5	40	
11	Moor Green	38	16	7	15	70	55	+15	39	
12	Highgate United	38	13	7	18	46	54	−8	33	
13	Malvern Town	38	9	15	14	39	51	−12	33	Transferred to the West Midlands (Regional) League
14	West Midlands Police	38	11	11	16	32	46	−14	33	
15	Racing Club Warwick	38	11	10	17	41	46	−5	32	
16	Walsall Wood	38	10	11	17	43	65	−22	31	
17	Cinderford Town	38	10	10	18	36	64	−28	30	
18	Northfield Town	38	12	5	21	41	62	−21	29	
19	Evesham United	38	7	5	26	29	80	−51	19	
20	Coleshill Town	38	1	11	26	22	72	−50	13	

Source: nonleaguematters
Rules for classification: 1) points; 2) goal difference; 3) number of goals scored.
