= GAFC =

GAFC may refer to:

- Garw Athletic F.C.
- Glenafton Athletic F.C.
- Grays Athletic F.C.
- Gresford Athletic F.C.
- Goole A.F.C.
- Gorleston F.C.
- Gornal Athletic F.C.
- Guiseley A.F.C.
