= Warstones Wanderers F.C. =

Association football club in England

Warstones Wanderers
- Full name: Warstones Wanderers Football Club
- Founded: 2001
- Ground: Aldersley Leisure Village, Wolverhampton
- Owner: Neil Worrallo
- League: West Midlands (Regional) League Premier Division
- 2024–25: West Midlands (Regional) League Premier Division, 11th of 15
Home colours

Warstones Wanderers Football Club is a football club based in Wolverhampton, West Midlands, England. They are currently members of the West Midlands (Regional) League Premier Division and play at Aldersley Leisure Village.

== History ==
The club was established in 2001 as an under-10 team. An adult Saturday team was established and entered the Wolverhampton & District Combination in 2005. After their first season, they were accepted into Division Two of the West Midlands (Regional) League. Despite only finishing seventh in their first season in the division, they were promoted to Division One as the division was increased in size. In 2008–09, they entered the FA Vase for the first time, beating Cradley Town 2–1 on penalties in the second qualifying round before losing 4–0 to Long Eaton United in the first round.

In 2012–13, the club resigned from the league midway through the season. However, they were readmitted to Division Two for the 2013–14 season.

== Ground ==
When the club joined the West Midlands (Regional) League, they played at Parkfields Stadium. However, they began their second season in the league without a home ground before moving to Wyrley Rangers' Long Lane Park in Essington. The club moved again for the 2008–09, groundsharing at Sporting Khalsa's Abbey Stadium. In 2010, they moved to Bloxwich United's Old Red Lion Ground, before moving to the Goodrich Sports Ground in 2011. By 2013, they were playing at the Aldersley Leisure Village.

== Records ==
- Best FA Vase performance: First round, 2008–09
