= Westfields F.C. =

Association football club in England

Coordinates: 52°03′50.09″N 2°43′13.47″W

Westfields
- Full name: Westfields Football Club
- Nickname: The Fields
- Founded: November 1966; 59 years ago
- Ground: allpay.park, Widemarsh Common, Hereford
- Capacity: 2,000
- Chairman: Steve Higgins
- Manager: Danny Janes
- League: Hellenic League Premier Division
- 2025–26: Hellenic League Premier Division, 14th of 20
Home colours	Away colours

Westfields Football Club is a football team from Hereford, England, formed in 1966 and currently playing in the Hellenic League Premier Division. The club is affiliated to the Herefordshire County FA.

== History ==
Westfields FC were formed in November 1966 by a group of local youths who played friendlies on Widemarsh Common. One of the youths, Andy Morris, is still involved with the club and is now its chief executive.

Westfields initially entered the Herefordshire Sunday League, where they played for ten years, winning a number of trophies. In 1973, they fielded their first Saturday team in the Worcester and District League. Two years later they moved their ground from the King George V playing fields to Thorn Lighting's Rotherwas headquarters where they gradually developed the ground over the subsequent years.

In 1978, the club stepped up to the West Midlands (Regional) League, initially in Division Two. Promotion to Division One came in 1983–84, followed by a further step up to the Premier Division three years later.

The 2002–03 season saw the club do a league and county cup double, becoming the West Midlands (Regional) League Premier Division champions for the first time and defeating rivals Kington Town to win the Herefordshire County Challenge Cup. The title win saw them promoted to the Midland Alliance, where they finished sixth in their first season, although their second season saw them flirt with relegation before finishing in 20th position.

In the 2015–16 season, they reached the Herefordshire County Challenge Cup final at Edgar Street, but lost to newly-formed Hereford, their divisional rivals in the Midland Football League.

During the 2016–17 season they qualified for the first round of the FA Cup for the first time in their history where they faced National League North club Curzon Ashton. After drawing 1–1 at home, they lost 3–1 in the replay and were knocked out.

In February 2018, manager Sean Edwards, who was in charge during the club's famous FA Cup run, resigned. He was replaced by coach Andy Bevan. Bevan himself resigned in May 2019, being replaced by former captain and coach Phil Glover.

In 2019, the club was transferred from the Midland Football League to the Hellenic League as part of a reorganisation at step 5 of the National League System.

In September 2023, the club parted ways with manager Phil Glover after their poor start to the season. He was replaced by former player Scott Russell on 5 October. In May 2025, former Hereford Lads Club manager Danny Moon was appointed the club's new manager. The club parted ways with manager Danny Moon following the conclusion of the 2025–26 season and appointed former Pershore Town manager Danny Janes in his place.

== Seasons ==
Season	League											FA Cup	FA Vase
Season	Division	Level (Step)	Pld	W	D	L	GF	GA	GD	Pts	Pos	FA Cup	FA Vase
1978–79	West Midlands (Regional) League Division Two	—	34	7	10	17	59	76	–17	24	16th	—	—
1979–80	West Midlands (Regional) League Division Two	—	38	18	8	12	58	41	+17	44	9th	—	—
1980–81	West Midlands (Regional) League Division Two	—	40	24	8	8	89	60	+29	56	3rd	—	—
1981–82	West Midlands (Regional) League Division Two	—	36	17	6	13	78	54	+24	40	8th	—	—
1982–83	West Midlands (Regional) League Division Two	—	32	10	7	15	55	59	–4	28	12th	—	—
1983–84	West Midlands (Regional) League Division Two	10	26	17	5	4	50	21	+29	39	2nd	—	—
1984–85	West Midlands (Regional) League Division One	9	34	21	9	4	74	39	+35	51	3rd	—	—
1985–86	West Midlands (Regional) League Division One	9	34	19	7	8	67	32	+35	45	3rd	—	EP
1986–87	West Midlands (Regional) League Division One	9	38	30	1	7	111	46	+65	61	1st	—	4R
1987–88	West Midlands (Regional) League Premier Division	8	34	10	6	18	60	64	–4	26	14th	—	PR
1988–89	West Midlands (Regional) League Premier Division	8	40	8	9	23	43	97	–54	33	17th	—	EP
1989–90	West Midlands (Regional) League Premier Division	8	40	10	7	23	44	84	–40	37	17th	—	PR
1990–91	West Midlands (Regional) League Premier Division	8	42	9	11	22	49	87	–38	32 (Note: Deducted six points)	19th	—	EP
1991–92	West Midlands (Regional) League Premier Division	8	36	6	12	18	48	74	–26	30	18th	—	EP
1992–93	West Midlands (Regional) League Premier Division	8	36	8	6	22	56	85	–29	30	18th	—	PR
1993–94	West Midlands (Regional) League Premier Division	8	38	7	7	24	58	92	–34	28	18th	—	2R
1994–95	West Midlands (Regional) League Premier Division	8	36	19	6	11	76	55	+21	63	5th	1Q	PR
1995–96	West Midlands (Regional) League Premier Division	8	36	16	6	14	86	73	+13	54	8th	PR	2Q
1996–97	West Midlands (Regional) League Premier Division	8	34	13	8	13	50	53	–3	47	10th	1Q	2Q
1997–98	West Midlands (Regional) League Premier Division	8	34	11	5	18	57	69	–12	38	14th	1Q	2Q
1998–99	West Midlands (Regional) League Premier Division	8	40	9	15	16	57	69	–12	42	17th	—	1R
1999–2000	West Midlands (Regional) League Premier Division	8	42	9	9	24	56	89	–33	36	20th	—	2Q
2000–01	West Midlands (Regional) League Premier Division	8	44	14	14	16	60	63	–3	56	14th	—	1R
2001–02	West Midlands (Regional) League Premier Division	8	46	24	9	13	89	53	+36	81	5th	—	1Q
2002–03	West Midlands (Regional) League Premier Division	8	42	31	6	5	119	39	+80	99	1st	—	1Q
2003–04	Midland Alliance	8	46	20	6	20	67	61	+6	66	13th	—	2Q
2004–05	Midland Alliance	9 (Note: Midland Alliance became level 9 of the English football league system for the 2004–05 season due to the addition of the Conference North and Conference South at level 6) (5)	42	18	13	11	61	48	+13	67	6th	1Q	1R
2005–06	Midland Alliance	9 (5)	42	8	9	25	48	88	–40	33	20th	1Q	2R
2006–07	Midland Alliance	9 (5)	42	13	9	20	57	78	–21	48	16th	1Q	1Q
2007–08	Midland Alliance	9 (5)	42	17	8	17	66	56	+10	59	11th	PR	2Q
2008–09	Midland Alliance	9 (5)	42	13	10	19	75	79	–4	49	17th	PR	3R
2009–10	Midland Alliance	9 (5)	42	23	7	12	82	55	+27	76	5th	1Q	2R
2010–11	Midland Alliance	9 (5)	44	24	13	7	102	54	+48	85	6th	PR	3R
2011–12	Midland Alliance	9 (5)	42	27	6	9	93	49	+44	87	2nd	EP	1R
2012–13	Midland Alliance	9 (5)	42	28	6	8	103	52	+51	90	2nd	2Q	1R
2013–14	Midland Alliance	9 (5)	42	17	10	15	84	70	+14	61	12th	EP	4R
2014–15	Midland League Premier Division	9 (5)	42	19	10	13	78	66	+12	67	8th	PR	3R
2015–16	Midland League Premier Division	9 (5)	42	13	12	17	69	68	+1	51	16th	1Q	1R
2016–17	Midland League Premier Division	9 (5)	42	20	10	12	98	75	+23	70	5th	1R	3R
2017–18	Midland League Premier Division	9 (5)	42	17	8	17	86	83	+3	59	12th	2Q	4R
2018–19	Midland League Premier Division	9 (5)	38	17	12	9	73	48	+25	63	4th	EP	3R
2019–20 (Note: Season abandoned due to COVID-19)	Hellenic League Premier Division	9 (5)	26	20	6	0	81	24	+57	66	1st	PR	3R
2020–21	Hellenic League Premier Division	9 (5)	5	2	1	2	5	5	0	7	14th	1Q	4R
2021–22	Hellenic League Premier Division	9 (5)	38	19	9	10	67	49	+18	66	7th	PR	2R
2022–23	Hellenic League Premier Division	9 (5)	38	18	10	10	67	42	+25	64	7th	EP	1R
2023–24	Hellenic League Premier Division	9 (5)	38	14	7	17	68	68	0	49	12th	PR	2Q
2024–25	Hellenic League Premier Division	9 (5)	38	12	8	18	68	54	+14	44	13th	PR	1Q
2025-26	Hellenic League Premier Division	9 (5)	38	13	6	19	51	75	–24	45	14th	PR	1Q
Source: Football Club History Database

Key

Promoted	Relegated

- ↑ = Promoted
- ↓ = Relegated
- EP = Extra preliminary round
- PR = Preliminary round
- 1Q = First qualifying round
- 2Q = Second qualifying round
- 3Q = Third qualifying round
- 4Q = Fourth qualifying round
- 1R = First round proper
- 2R = Second round proper
- 3R = Third round proper
- 4R = Fourth round proper
- 5R = Fifth round proper
- QF = Quarter-finals
- SF = Semi-finals
- RU = Runners-up
- W = Winners

== Colours ==
Westfields took their claret and blue colours from West Ham United, as its founders admired Bobby Moore, Martin Peters and Geoff Hurst, who were part of the England squad that won the World Cup in the year they were founded.

== Ground ==
After playing for many years at the sports ground of Thorn Lighting on the Rotherwas Industrial Estate to the south of Hereford, Westfields began their first Midland Alliance campaign playing their home games at Stourport Swifts' Walshes Meadow ground. Westfields moved to a new £250,000 ground in the heart of the city in December 2003. The new ground gained the rather unusual name of allpay.park after a sponsorship deal with Hereford-based firm allpay.net.

== Current squad ==
As of 19 August 2026

Note: Flags indicate national team as defined under FIFA eligibility rules; some limited exceptions apply. Players may hold more than one non-FIFA nationality.

Pos.	Nation	Player
GK	ENG	Matt Gwynne
DF	ENG	George Clarke
DF	ENG	Joe Hunt
DF	ENG	Chris Gregan
DF	ENG	Ben Tilbery
DF	ENG	Jac Evans
DF	ENG	Sean Cooke
DF	ENG	Mike McGrath
DF	ENG	Jack Creswell
MF	ENG	James Douglas
MF	ENG	Reiss Taylor-Randall
MF	ENG	Dan Cottrill
MF	ENG	Will Dallaway
MF	ENG	Will Beach
FW	ENG	James Baldwin
FW	ENG	Jamie Clarke
FW	ENG	Yuri Quintas
FW	ENG	Finn Waller
FW	ENG	Tyrese Sibanda
FW	ENG	Bailey Fuller

=== Backroom staff ===
Position	Name
Manager	Danny Janes
Coach	Mike Hibbard
Physio	Tiago Viana
Kit man	Roger Lloyd

== Club records ==
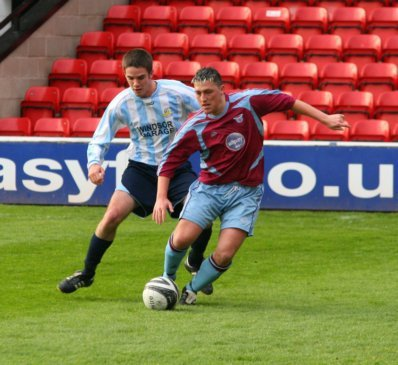
Westfields (claret and blue) in action against Coventry Sphinx in 2010

- Best league performance: 2nd in Midland Football Alliance, 2011–12, 2012–13
- Best FA Cup performance: First Round Proper, 2016–17
- Best FA Vase performance: Fourth round, 1986–87, 2013–14
- Record attendance: 1825 against Hereford 31 August 2015

== Sources ==
- Mike and Tony Williams (2006). Non League Club Directory 2006. Tony Williams Publications Ltd. ISBN 1-869833-54-6.
- Westfields at the Football Club History Database
