= Harrisons F.C. =

Harrisons
- Full name: Harrisons Football Club
- Founded: c. 1950
- Dissolved: 1990
- Ground: Hazel Lane, Great Wyrley
- Capacity: 2,000
- 1989–90: West Midlands (Regional) League; Premier Division, 12th
Home colours	Away colours

Harrisons F.C. is a defunct football club from Great Wyrley, Staffordshire, England, formerly members of the West Midlands (Regional) League.

Previously members of the Staffordshire County League (South), they moved up to the West Midlands Regional League in 1982 initially playing in Division Two. They finished runners-up in their first season, gaining promotion to Division One. They won that, in 1984–85 earning another promotion to the Premier Division. After a good first season (finishing fourth), they were never again able to finish in the top half of the division. After playing the 1992–93 season under the name Harrisons S T S, they withdrew from senior football in 1990, although some junior sides and Sunday teams carried on playing under the Harrisons name.

The club also placed a reserve side in the West Midlands (Regional) League Division Two from 1984 to 1990.

Harrisons played in the FA Cup on two occasions, failing to win a match on either occasion. They had marginally more success in the FA Vase, entering in four seasons with a best performance of making the Second Round (last 64) in their final appearance before their demise.

Their ground, in Hazel Lane, Great Wyrley (situated opposite the ground used by Great Wyrley F.C.) was vandalised in the late 1990s and all permanent structures were removed, although the pitch remains in use. Wyrley Juniors FC have a long-term lease of the ground and they have plans to bring it back to life

== Season-by-season record (incomplete) ==
Season	Division	Position	Notes
1982–83	West Midlands (Regional) League Division Two	2	Promoted
1983–84	West Midlands (Regional) League Division One	4	
1984–85	West Midlands (Regional) League Division One	1	Promoted
1985–86	West Midlands (Regional) League Premier Division	4	
1986–87	West Midlands (Regional) League Premier Division	10	
1987–88	West Midlands (Regional) League Premier Division	11	
1988–89	West Midlands (Regional) League Premier Division	12	
1989–90	West Midlands (Regional) League Premier Division	12	Folded
