= Lichfield City F.C. =

Association football club in England

Coordinates: 52.693279°N 1.813705°W

Lichfield City
- Full name: Lichfield City Football Club
- Founded: 1970
- Ground: City Ground, Lichfield
- Capacity: 1,500
- Chairman: Darren Leaver
- Manager: Vacant
- League: Northern Premier League Division One West
- 2025–26: Northern Premier League Division One Midlands, 8th of 22 (transferred)
Home colours

Lichfield City Football Club is a football club based in Lichfield, Staffordshire, England. They are members of the Northern Premier League Division One West and play at the City Ground.

== History ==
The original Lichfield City joined the Birmingham Combination in 1923, but left after two seasons. The modern club was established in 1970 as Lichfield Football Club and joined Division One B of the West Midlands (Regional) League in 1976. They were placed in Division One the following season when the league was reorganised and remained in the division until being relegated to Division Two at the end of the 1985–86 season. The club were Division Two runners-up in 1989–90, earning promotion back to Division One. In 1994 they were renamed Lichfield City. Their first season under the new name saw the club finish as runners-up in Division One, earning promotion to the Premier Division.

Despite finishing in mid-table in their first season in the Premier Division, Lichfield resigned from the league and became a Sunday league team. They returned to Saturday football when the club joined Division Three of the Midland Combination in 2008. Despite only finishing fifth in the division in 2008–09, they were promoted to Division Two. In 2010–11 the club won the league's Challenge Vase with a 2–1 win over Continental Star Reserves in the final. They also finished fourth in the division, earning promotion to Division One. Another fourth-place finish the following season led to them being promoted to the Premier Division.

In 2014 the Midland Combination merged with the Midland Alliance to form the Midland League, with Lichfield placed in Division One. In 2021 the club were promoted to the Premier Division based on their results in the abandoned 2019–20 and 2020–21 seasons. They won the JW Hunt Cup in 2022–23, defeating OJM 3–0 in the final. They retained the cup the following season, beating Wolverhampton Sporting 3–1 in the final. The club were also runners-up in the Midland League Premier Division, qualifying for the promotion play-offs. After beating Highgate United 3–1 in the semi-finals, they lost 3–1 to Darlaston Town (1874) in the final.

The 2024–25 season saw Lichfield win the Midland League Premier Division title, earning promotion to Division One Midlands of the Northern Premier League. At the end of the 2025–26 season they were transferred to Division One West.

== Honours ==
- Midland League
  - Premier Division champions 2024–25
- Midland Combination
  - Challenge Vase winners 2010–11
- JW Hunt Cup
  - Winners 2022–23, 2023–24

== Records ==
- Best FA Cup performance: Second qualifying round, 2022–23
- Best FA Trophy performance: First qualifying round, 2025–26
- Best FA Vase performance: Fourth round, 2023–24
- Record attendance: 1,110 vs Darlaston Town (1874), Midland League Premier Division play-off final, 4 May 2024

== See also ==
- Lichfield City F.C. players
- Lichfield City F.C. managers
