= West Midlands (Regional) League =

Association football league in England

- Founded: 1889
- Country: England
- Divisions: Premier Division; Division One
- Number of clubs: 30
- Level on pyramid: Level 11 (Premier Division)
- Feeder to: Midland League Division One
- Relegation to: Shropshire County League; Herefordshire Football League
- Domestic cup(s): Premier Division League Cup; Division One League Cup
- Current champions: Bustleholme (2025–26)

The West Midlands (Regional) League is an English association football competition for semi-professional and amateur teams based in the West Midlands county, Shropshire, Worcestershire, southern Staffordshire and northern Herefordshire. It has two divisions, the highest of which is the Premier Division, a regional feeder for the National League System (NLS) at the eleventh level of the overall English football league system.

The league was formed in 1889 as the Birmingham & District League to cater for teams in Birmingham and the surrounding area, but soon became established as one of the strongest leagues outside the Football League itself, with teams from as far afield as Bristol and Wales taking part. After the Second World War it absorbed the rival Birmingham Combination to become firmly established as the leading league in the area, but a gradual decline in its status began in the late 1950s and it now operates at a much lower level than in its heyday. The league acts as a feeder to the Midland Football League Division One, to which one team may be promoted each season, while new members regularly join from a number of lower, more local leagues.

== History ==
=== Early years ===
In the late 1880s, Birmingham and the surrounding region boasted many of the country's strongest football teams. Six of the region's leading clubs joined the first two national leagues set up in England, the Football League and the Football Alliance, but there were still many teams in the area keen to participate in league play. On 31 May 1889 a meeting took place at Birmingham's Grand Hotel with the view to forming a Birmingham & District League. A total of 17 clubs were invited but only 13 attended, of which 12 were selected to form the new league, to commence play in the 1889–90 season. The one club which sent a representative to the meeting but was not invited to take part in the league, for unknown reasons, was Worcester Rovers.

The 12 clubs competing in the league's inaugural season were Aston Victoria, Great Bridge Unity, Hednesford Town, Ironbridge, Kidderminster Harriers, Kidderminster Olympic, Langley Green Victoria, Oldbury Town, Smethwick Carriage Works, Unity Gas Department, Wellington St George's, and Willenhall Pickwick. Although Kidderminster Olympic topped the final table, no championship was awarded as a number of fixtures had not been completed. This situation was to be repeated in each of the subsequent two seasons, in both of which Brierley Hill Alliance, who had joined the league for its second season, topped the table but did not win the title. The early years of the league also saw new teams joining and existing ones dropping out almost every season, but once the league's structure settled down, it came to be regarded as one of the strongest leagues outside the Football League itself, rivalled only by the Southern League and the Midland League. Despite the league's name, in the years prior to the First World War it came to include teams from as far afield as Bristol, Wrexham and Crewe, as well as including the reserve teams of local Football League clubs. A number of clubs which had enjoyed success in the Birmingham Combination also joined the league, which was seen as a step up to a better standard of football.

The league's large coverage area began to create problems in the 1930s, however, as many clubs found the long and costly journeys to away matches difficult, and began to drop out in favour of playing in leagues which covered smaller areas. In 1938, Bangor City, Worcester City, Wellington Town and the reserve teams of Cardiff City and Wrexham all resigned from the league, reducing the numbers so much that instead of the usual format the organising committee decided to run two separate competitions each lasting for half of the 1938–39 season, the first named the Keys Cup and the second the League Cup. By the time competitive football was abandoned in 1939 due to the outbreak of the Second World War, the rival Birmingham Combination, which had not chosen to accept teams from such a wide area, had consolidated and come to be regarded as the region's top league.

=== Post-war years ===
Although the league lost further clubs to the Combination, which was quicker to restart after the war, within a few years the League had regained its position of pre-eminence in the region, increasing to almost twice its pre-war size. During the 1952–53 season the League's committee proposed a merger of the two competitions, but the Combination rejected the idea, whereupon the Combination's six best teams all resigned and joined the League. The Combination's committee then attempted to re-open the merger talks but, having just bolstered its ranks with six new members, the League was not interested. A year later, all of the Combination's 14 remaining clubs, with the exception of West Bromwich Albion's 'A' (third) team, left to join the League, which effectively absorbed its former rival. The 40 member clubs were split into Northern and Southern divisions, which a year later were re-arranged into Divisions One and Two, with promotion and relegation taking place between the two.

At the end of the 1957–58 season, Burton Albion and Nuneaton Borough left to join an expanding Southern League, followed a year later by Hinckley Athletic. In an attempt to consolidate the league decided to expel all remaining reserve teams, reducing to a single division of 22 clubs. Four years later it changed its name to the West Midlands (Regional) League to more accurately reflect its catchment area, which now included very few teams from Birmingham or its immediate environs. For the 1965–66 season the league was able to revert to a two-division structure when it rebranded its existing single division the Premier Division and added a new Division One. By 1976, a steady flow of teams joining from smaller regional leagues led to Division One being split into Divisions One (A) and One (B), revised a year later to Divisions One and Two.

=== Modern era ===
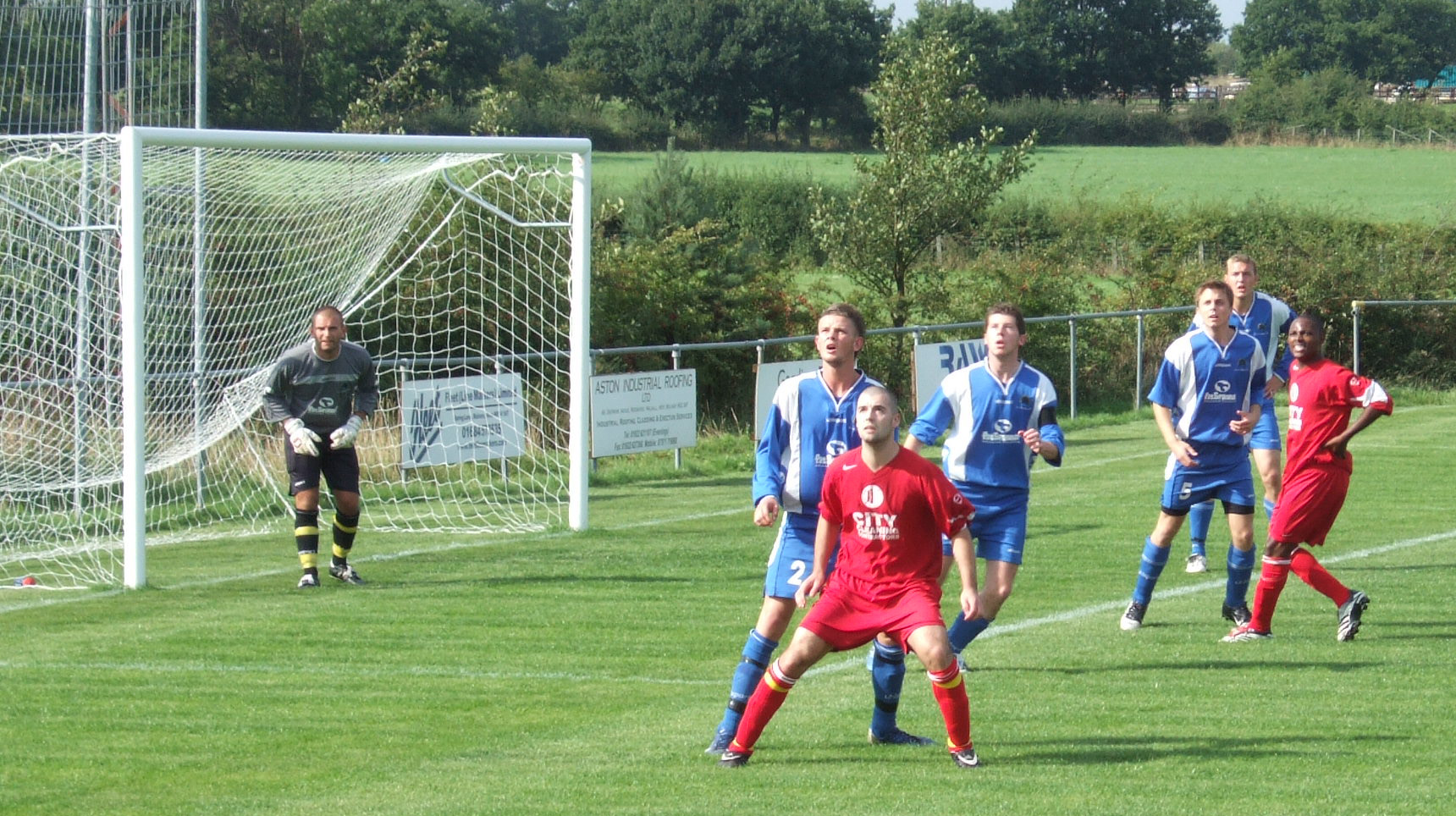
WMRL action from 2006, as the now defunct Wyrley Rangers take on Gornal Athletic.

The Alliance Premier League was formed in 1979, pushing the Regional League further down the English football league system. Successful Regional League clubs such as Bilston Town, Hednesford Town and Halesowen Town began applying to, and being accepted into, the Southern League, reducing the Regional League to the status of a feeder league, although their departures continued to be offset by a flow of new members from lower-level leagues. Reflecting the demographics of the West Midlands area, a number of British Asian teams joined the league, including Sikh Hunters, England's first ever all-Sikh team. At the same time the catchment areas of the Regional League and the Midland Football Combination were increasingly converging, and by the early 1990s the standard of play and geographical coverage of the two competitions were considered to be almost identical. A new competition was formed in 1994 to cater for the best clubs previously split across the two leagues, and thus the Regional League lost ten of its member clubs to the Midland Football Alliance, further reducing its own status.

The reduction in numbers forced the league to revert to a two-division structure, but within two seasons numbers had grown again to the extent that Division One was split into Divisions One (North) and One (South) for the 1996–97 season, a format retained until 2004 when the two Division Ones were re-organised into Division One and Division Two. As a result of the COVID-19 pandemic in England, both the 2019–20 and 2020–21 seasons were abandoned, with all 2020 results being expunged, and no promotion or relegation taking place to, from, or within the competition. However, the scheduled restructuring of non-League football took place at the end of the 2020–21 season, with a new division added to the Northern Premier League at Step 4 for 2021–22, which resulted in most of the WMRL's Step 6 clubs being reallocated to other divisions within that step.

== Structure ==
The league currently has no title sponsor. Previously it has been sponsored by Sport Italia, the Wolverhampton-based Express & Star newspaper, and Black Country brewery Banks's. Some of the teams in the lower two divisions are reserve teams of clubs playing at a higher level. Each division is contested on a double round-robin basis, with each team playing each of the other teams in the division once at home and once away. Three points are awarded for a win (increased from two with effect from the 1988–89 season), one for a draw and zero for a defeat. Goal difference is used to separate teams on the same points, having replaced goal average at the start of the 1978–79 season.

From the 1994–95 to 2013–14 seasons the Regional League, along with the Midland Football Combination, served as one of the two official feeders to the Midland Football Alliance. The highest-placed team which met the Alliance's entry requirements was promoted to the Alliance, and one or more teams were relegated into the Regional League from the Alliance depending on the number of clubs remaining in each league. In 2014 the Alliance and Combination merged to form the Midland League, and the Regional League now acts as a feeder to the top division of that league. Prior to the 2006–07 season, the Regional League's top division was defined as a step 7 league within the National League System (NLS), even though it fed into the Alliance, which was graded as step 5. In 2006 the Regional League was re-graded by the Football Association as a step 6 league. Teams in the top two divisions are eligible to take part in the FA Cup and FA Vase as long as their grounds meet the required standards.

Since re-organisation in 1994, the Regional League has accepted applications for membership from successful teams in smaller local leagues within its catchment area. Leagues whose clubs joined the Regional League include the Shropshire County League, the Herefordshire League, the Wolverhampton Combination, and the Kidderminster & District League. Several ambitious local Sunday league teams also switched to Saturday play and entered the league. Bewdley Town, Bromyard Town and Ellesmere Rangers all joined from county leagues since 1994 and subsequently gone on to gain promotion to the Premier Division. Regional League teams could also theoretically be relegated to the local leagues but in practice this almost never happens. The only teams in recent history to drop down to a county league have been Leominster Town, Kington Town and Hinton, who dropped down to the Herefordshire League in 2004, 2006 and 2007 respectively, although all three clubs resigned voluntarily in favour of playing in a more local league as opposed to being relegated due to finishing at the bottom of the table. Owing to most of the league's Premier Division clubs' promotions to Step 5 leagues or transfers to other Step 6 divisions as part of restructuring the NLS ahead of the 2021–22 season, the WMRL was reduced to two divisions and lost its place at Step 6, becoming a new NLS regional feeder. The league renamed its Divisions One and Two to Premier and One respectively for the 2024–25 season.

== Attendance ==
At one time the league attracted large crowds for matches, with 3,000 spectators watching a match between Coventry City and Shrewsbury Town in 1899. By the early 1960s, despite the league's decline in status, Kidderminster Harriers were still able to attract crowds of around 1,000 fans for home matches. In the modern era, however, crowds are much smaller. In the 1993–94 season Rocester averaged around 100 fans for home games, and several of the team's away matches drew crowds of less than 40. Attendance figures are not currently published for league fixtures, but in the FA Vase in the 2005–06 season home attendances for Regional League teams averaged around 50, with only Wellington's match against Alvechurch of the then-existent Midland Alliance drawing over 100 spectators.

== Current members ==
The member clubs of the league for the 2026–27 season are as follows:

=== Premier Division ===
- AFC Somers
- Bilbrook
- Chasetown Reserves
- Dudley Athletic
- Dudley Kingswinford
- Dudley Sports
- FC Darlaston
- Gornal Colts
- Oldbury United
- Pelsall Villa Colts
- PS Olympic
- Saltley Stallions
- Stourbridge Standard
- Stourport Swifts Development
- Tipton Town
- Warstones Wanderers
- Wrens Nest
- Wyrley

=== Division One ===
- AFC Wolves
- Avery
- Bartley Reds
- Bewdley Town Reserves
- Birmingham Albion
- BYSA
- Kewford Eagles
- Lye Town Reserves
- MGR
- Old Rewfrunians
- Oldbury United Reserves
- Tipton Town Development
- Walsall Phoenix
- Wednesfield Community Reserves
- Wolverhampton Sporting Community
- Wombourne Allstars

== League champions ==
=== Birmingham & District League ===
Initially the league consisted of a single division

Season	Champions
1889–90	no championship awarded
1890–91	no championship awarded
1891–92	no championship awarded
1892–93	Wolverhampton Wanderers Reserves
1893–94	Old Hill Wanderers
1894–95	Aston Villa Reserves
1895–96	Aston Villa Reserves
1896–97	Hereford Thistle
1897–98	Wolverhampton Wanderers Reserves
1898–99	Wolverhampton Wanderers Reserves
1899–1900	Aston Villa Reserves
1900–01	Wolverhampton Wanderers Reserves
1901–02	West Bromwich Albion Reserves
1902–03	Aston Villa Reserves
1903–04	Aston Villa Reserves
1904–05	Aston Villa Reserves
1905–06	Aston Villa Reserves
1906–07	Aston Villa Reserves
1907–08	Aston Villa Reserves
1908–09	Aston Villa Reserves
1909–10	Aston Villa Reserves
1910–11	Stoke
1911–12	Aston Villa Reserves
1912–13	West Bromwich Albion Reserves
1913–14	Worcester City
1914–15	Birmingham Reserves

Between 1915 and 1919 the competition was suspended due to the First World War.

Season	Champions
1919–20	West Bromwich Albion Reserves
1920–21	Wellington Town
1921–22	Willenhall
1922–23	Shrewsbury Town
1923–24	Stourbridge
1924–25	Worcester City
1925–26	Cradley Heath
1926–27	Stafford Rangers
1927–28	Burton Town
1928–29	Worcester City
1929–30	Worcester City
1930–31	Cradley Heath
1931–32	Cradley Heath
1932–33	Wrexham Reserves
1933–34	Wrexham Reserves
1934–35	Wellington Town
1935–36	Wellington Town
1936–37	Bristol Rovers
1937–38	Kidderminster Harriers

Due to the number of teams having dropped dramatically, the 1938–39 season consisted of two separate "half-season" leagues. The Keys Cup was contested until Christmas and the League Cup for the remainder of the season.

Season	Keys Cup	League Cup
1938–39	Kidderminster Harriers	Kidderminster Harriers

The 1939–40 season was abandoned due to the outbreak of the Second World War and the league did not resume operations until 1946.

Season	Champions
1946–47	Halesowen Town
1947–48	Kettering Town
1948–49	Worcester City Reserves
1949–50	Hereford United Reserves
1950–51	Brierley Hill Alliance
1951–52	Brierley Hill Alliance
1952–53	Oswestry Town
1953–54	Wolverhampton Wanderers 'A'

For the 1954–55 season the league was split into two regional sections.

Season	Northern Section	Southern Section
1954–55	Nuneaton Borough	Redditch United

For the 1955–56 season the league was re-organised into Division One and Division Two.

Season	Division One	Division Two
1955–56	Nuneaton Borough	Tamworth
1956–57	Walsall Reserves	Bilston
1957–58	Wolverhampton Wanderers 'A'	Oswestry Town
1958–59	Wolverhampton Wanderers 'A'	Birmingham City 'A'
1959–60	Bromsgrove Rovers	Aston Villa 'A'

The league reverted to a single-division format for the 1960–61 season.

Season	Champions
1960–61	Bilston
1961–62	Lockheed Leamington

=== West Midlands (Regional) League ===
Season	Champions
1962–63	Lockheed Leamington
1963–64	Tamworth
1964–65	Kidderminster Harriers

For the 1965–66 season the league reverted to a two-division format, now comprising the Premier Division and Division One.

Season	Premier Division	Division One
1965–66	Tamworth	Wrockwardine Wood
1966–67	Boston United	Tamworth Reserves
1967–68	Boston United	Warley
1968–69	Kidderminster Harriers	Wrockwardine Wood
1969–70	Kidderminster Harriers	Warley County Borough
1970–71	Kidderminster Harriers	Brereton Social
1971–72	Tamworth	Warley County Borough
1972–73	Bilston	Tividale
1973–74	Alvechurch	Armitage
1974–75	Alvechurch	Staffordshire Police
1975–76	Alvechurch	Willenhall Town

For the 1976–77 season Division One was split into 'A' and 'B' sections.

Season	Premier Division	Division One (A)	Division One (B)
1976–77	Alvechurch	Wednesfield Social	Wolverhampton United

For the 1977–78 season Division One (A) and Division One (B) were re-organised into Division One and Division Two.

Season	Premier Division	Division One	Division Two
1977–78	Hednesford Town	Chasetown	Worcester City Reserves
1978–79	Willenhall Town	Shifnal Town	Ludlow Town
1979–80	Sutton Coldfield Town	Rushall Olympic	Brewood
1980–81	Shifnal Town	Oldswinford	Bromsgrove Rovers Reserves
1981–82	Shifnal Town	Atherstone United	GKN Sankey
1982–83	Halesowen Town	Brewood	Great Wyrley
1983–84	Halesowen Town	Tipton Town	Halesowen Town Reserves
1984–85	Halesowen Town	Harrisons	Halesowen Harriers
1985–86	Halesowen Town	Halesowen Harriers	Springvale-Tranco
1986–87	Atherstone United	Westfields	Donnington Wood
1987–88	Tamworth	Rocester	Hinton
1988–89	Blakenall	Newport Town	Broseley Athletic
1989–90	Hinckley Town	Darlaston	Hill Top Rangers
1990–91	Gresley Rovers	Cradley Town	Clancey Dudley
1991–92	Gresley Rovers	Ilkeston Town	K Chell
1992–93	Oldbury United	Knypersley Victoria	Rushall Olympic Reserves

For the 1993–94 season Division Two was discontinued.

Season	Premier Division	Division One
1993–94	Ilkeston Town	Stafford Town
1994–95	Pelsall Villa	Wolverhampton Casuals
1995–96	Wednesfield	Goodyear

For the 1996–97 season Division One was split into two regional sections.

Season	Premier Division	Division One (North)	Division One (South)
1996–97	Wednesfield	Great Wyrley	Kington Town
1997–98	Lye Town	Bandon	Smethwick Rangers
1998–99	Kington Town	Heath Hayes	Wellington
1999–2000	Stafford Town	Shawbury United	Bromyard Town
2000–01	Ludlow Town	Wolverhampton United	Ledbury Town
2001–02	Causeway United	Ounsdale	Sedgley White Lions
2002–03	Westfields	Newport Town	Bewdley Town
2003–04	Malvern Town	Goodrich	Gornal Athletic

For the 2004–05 season Division One (North) and Division One (South) were re-organised back into Division One and Division Two.

Season	Premier Division	Division One	Division Two
2004–05	Tipton Town	Great Wyrley	Parkfields Leisure
2005–06	Market Drayton Town	Ellesmere Rangers	AFC Wulfrunians
2006–07	Shifnal Town	Darlaston Town	Heath Town Rangers
2007–08	Bridgnorth Town	Birchills United	Wellington Amateurs
2008–09	AFC Wulfrunians	Wellington Amateurs	Hanwood United
2009–10	Ellesmere Rangers	Wellington Amateurs	Black Country Rangers
2010–11	Tividale	Black Country Rangers	Malvern Rangers
2011–12	Gornal Athletic	Wellington Amateurs	Haughmond
2012–13	AFC Wulfrunians	AFC Smethwick	Gornal Athletic Reserves
2013–14	Lye Town	AFC Bridgnorth	AFC Ludlow
2014–15	Sporting Khalsa	Bromyard Town	Kington Town
2015–16	Shawbury United	Shifnal Town	Newport Town
2016–17	Haughmond	Hereford Lads Club	Telford Juniors
2017–18	Wolverhampton Sporting Community	Wem Town	Sikh Hunters
2018–19	Tividale	Worcester Raiders	Gornal Colts
2019–20	No champions; season abandoned due to coronavirus pandemic		
2020–21	No champions; season abandoned due to coronavirus pandemic		

For the 2021–22 season the league was reduced to two divisions and lost its Premier Division.

Season	Division One	Division Two
2021–22	Droitwich Spa	Warstones Wanderers
2022–23	Allscott Heath	Pelsall Villa Colts
2023–24	Pelsall Villa Colts	AFC Bentley

For the 2024–25 season the league renamed its two divisions, reverting again to Premier Division and Division One.

Season	Premier Division	Division One
2024–25	Telford Town	AFC Somers
2025–26	Bustleholme	Chasetown Reserves
