= Wolverhampton Casuals F.C. =

Association football club in England

Coordinates: 52°38′42.6″N 2°7′31.1″W

Wolverhampton Casuals
- Full name: Wolverhampton Casuals Football Club
- Nickname: The Cassies
- Founded: 1899
- Ground: Brinsford Lane, Featherstone
- Chairman: Gareth Deacon
- Manager: Dean Gill
- League: North West Counties League Division One South
- 2025–26: North West Counties League Division One South, 14th of 18
Home colours	Away colours

Wolverhampton Casuals Football Club is a football club based in Featherstone, near Wolverhampton, England. Established in 1899, they are currently members of the North West Counties League Division One South and play at Brinsford Lane.

== History ==
Wolverhampton Casuals Football Club was established in 1899. They joined Division Two of the West Midlands (Regional) League in 1982. After a sixth-placed finish in 1983–84, the club were promoted to Division One. They finished as runners-up in Division One for the next three season, but it was only after finishing fourth in 1987–88 that the club were promoted to the Premier Division.

At the end of the 1990–91 season, Casuals were demoted to Division One. They won the Division One title in 1994–95 and were promoted back to the Premier Division. The 1997–98 season saw the club win the Staffordshire Vase, beating Hanford Y&A on penalties in the final. In 2000–01, they won the Walsall Senior Cup, beating Sutton Coldfield Town 2–0 in the final. The club were Premier Division runners-up in 2016–17. Based on their performance in the partial 2019–20 and 2021–22 seasons, which were abandoned due to the COVID-19 pandemic, they were promoted to the Premier Division of the Midland League.

== Ground ==
The club play at Brinsford Lane in Featherstone. Due to its lack of floodlights, they relocated to the Aldersley Stadium in Wolverhampton for several years, until floodlights were installed in 1998. A seated stand was built in the early 1990s. The ground has also been used as a temporary home by Newport Town and Tipton Sports & Social.

== Honours ==
- West Midlands (Regional) League
  - Division One champions 1994–95
- Walsall Senior Cup
  - Winners 2000–01
- Staffordshire Vase
  - Winners 1997–98

== Records ==
- Best FA Cup performance: First qualifying round, 2012–13
- Best FA Vase performance: Second round, 2016–17, 2023–24

== See also ==
- Wolverhampton Casuals F.C. players
