= Knypersley Victoria F.C. =

Defunct association football club in England

Knypersley Victoria
- Full name: Knypersley Victoria Football Club
- Nickname: The Vics
- Founded: 1969
- Dissolved: 2018
- Ground: Tunstall Road, Biddulph
| Home colours | Away colours |

Knypersley Victoria Football Club was a football club based in Biddulph, Staffordshire, England. They played at Tunstall Road.

== History ==
The club was established as Knypersley Victoria in 1969, inheriting the Tunstall Road ground of the defunct Knypersley Football Club. They entered teams into the Staffordshire County League and the Leek & Moorlands Sunday League. However, financial difficulties forced the club to disband their Saturday side during the 1970s until they rejoined the Division One of the Staffordshire County League in 1980. In 1984 the club were founder members of the Staffordshire Senior League. They were runners-up in 1987–88 and remained in the league until joining Division One of the West Midlands (Regional) League in 1991. They won the Division One title in 1992–93, earning promotion to Division One.

In 1994 Knypersley were founder members of the Midland Alliance, which took the top clubs from the West Midlands (Regional) League and the Midland Combination. In 2002 the club was renamed Biddulph Victoria. They folded at the end of the 2010–11 season after being evicted from Tunstall Road. However, the club was reformed in 2013 as Knypersley Victoria and joined Division One of the Staffordshire County Senior League. After finishing fourth in 2014–15, they were promoted to the Premier Division. In June 2018 the club resigned from the league and subsequently folded.

== Honours ==
- West Midlands (Regional) League
  - Division One champions 1992–93

== Records ==
- Best FA Cup performance: Fourth qualifying round, 1997–98
- Best FA Vase performance: Third round, 2009–10

== See also ==
- Knypersley Victoria F.C. players
