= Halesowen Harriers F.C. =

Halesowen Harriers
- Full name: Halesowen Harriers Football Club
- Founded: 1961
- Dissolved: 2003
- Ground: Park Road, Halesowen
- 2002–03: Midland Football Alliance, 21st

Halesowen Harriers F.C. was an English association football club based in Halesowen. The club played in the West Midlands (Regional) League from 1984 until 1994 and the Midland Football Alliance from 1994 until financial problems led to the club closing down in 2003.

== History ==
Halesowen Harriers F.C. was founded by Derek Beasley and formed in 1961 as a Sunday league team, although as local laws at the time prohibited football from being played on Sundays, the team had to play all their matches away from home. In 1962 the club joined the Festival League, a Birmingham-based Sunday league, where they won a number of championships. In 1980 the team also reached the semi-final stage of the FA Sunday Cup.

In 1984 the club opted to switch to Saturday football and joined the West Midlands (Regional) League, initially in Division Two, and won the league championship at the first attempt. In the 1985–86 season, the Harriers gained a second consecutive championship, winning the Division One title to gain a place in the Premier Division. The club spent eight seasons in the Premier Division, with a best finish of third place in the 1988–89 season, the same year in which the Harriers achieved their best ever run in the FA Vase, reaching the third round. In 1994 the club was selected to be one of the founder members of the Midland Football Alliance. Financial problems dogged the club, however, and in 2003 it was forced to close down, the last ever Halesowen Harriers match being a home game with Causeway United on 28 April 2003.

== Grounds ==
The Harriers' first home ground was a park pitch in Bartley Green, followed by a similar pitch in Kingstanding. In 1969 the club began a ground share arrangement at the home of Halesowen Town. Coinciding with the switch from Sunday to Saturday play in 1984, the club opened a new ground at Park Road in Halesowen, which had a capacity of 4,000, with 350 seats. The highest attendance registered at the ground was 672 for a friendly against Wolverhampton Wanderers in 1988.

== Club records ==
- Best league position: 6th in Midland Alliance, 1998–99
- Best FA Cup run: 2nd qualifying round, 1992–93
- Best FA Vase run: 3rd round proper, 1988–89
