= Ludlow Town F.C. =

Coordinates: 52°22′50.48″N 2°43′54.05″W

- Full name: Ludlow Town Football Club
- Nickname: The Knights
- Founded: 1890
- Dissolved: 2012
- Ground: The SBS Stadium
- 2011–12: Shropshire County Premier Football League; Premier Division, 6th
Home colours	Away colours

Ludlow Town Football Club was a football club based in Ludlow, Shropshire, England.

== History ==
Ludlow Town Football Club was founded in 1890 and played on council grounds around the town until 1981 when they acquired their own facilities at The Riddings Park.

The club played in the South Shropshire, North Herefordshire, Kidderminster and Shropshire County Leagues until 1978 when their success in local football was rewarded with election to the West Midlands (Regional) League Division Two. In their debut season they won the title to clinch promotion to Division One.

The club was mainly a mid-table side until 1990–91 when they finished as runners-up in Division One to Cradley Town, unfortunately they were denied promotion as their ground did not come up to the required standard. After ground improvements were made, the club was elected into the Premier Division in 1994 and during their first season at that level also reached the Premier League Cup Final and won the Shropshire County Cup and the Presteigne Otway Cup.

In 1995 Town merged with local rivals Ludlow Colts, as the town was proving unable to sustain two clubs. In 2000 Les Bristow took over as manager and led the club to the championship of the Premier Division, dominating the division with just one loss all season and 100 goals scored. This saw the club promoted to the Midland Football Alliance, where they spent four seasons before succumbing to relegation in 2005. During this time they also re-located to their new ground, the SBS Stadium, located on Bromfield Road on the northern outskirts of the town.

Ludlow finished 10th in the Premier Division of the West Midlands (Regional) League in 2009–10. However, in 2010 the club announced its intention to withdraw from that League with immediate effect and drop three levels to the Shropshire County Premier Football League, due to financial difficulties. The team merged with their reserve side, which already played in the Shropshire County League, and they played their final seasons in the Premier Division of that League, finishing 3rd in the 2010–11 season and 6th in their final season of 2011–12. With the folding of the Shropshire Alliance in 2011, the Colts team joined the County League's Division One in 2011–12, as Ludlow Town Reserves.

In July 2012 the club entered receivership, with debts exceeding £400,000.

== Stadium ==
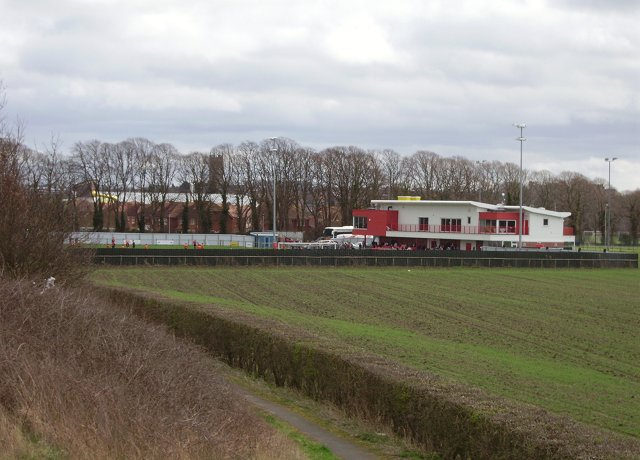
Ludlow's stadium, located just off the A49 at Burway; after the club's demise there have been two private sales of the ground.

Town moved to The SBS Stadium which was opened by Bobby Charlton in 2002 after selling their previous home at The Riddings Park for housing. It boasts a well-appointed main stand with physio room and club offices, and two 'full-sized' floodlit football pitches (one grass, one artificial). In 2004 it hosted an international match between the England learning difficulties football team and their German counterparts. On 3 August 2008 it also hosted a Legends Match between Manchester United and Liverpool.

A deal to sell the ground (and lease it back to the club) to cancel out the club's considerable debts in 2011 failed. This was a major factor in the club's folding in 2012.

The stadium was eventually sold in April 2013 to a consortium fronted by local businessman Matt Davies. At the time, Davies said he planned to use it for various sports. However the following year Davies announced that "I'm intending to close the club – that's the long and short of it".

The stadium and its several pitches, already pre-zoned for residential development, were finally closed to sports teams in July 2014. Later that year Powys businessman Roy Delves, owner of Tuffins supermarkets, acquired a controlling stake with promises to safeguard the stadium for the foreseeable future. In September 2017 Shrewsbury Town in the Community struck a deal to lease the stadium to develop football across the community and to upgrade the under used facilities.

== Honours ==
- West Midlands (Regional) League
  - Premier Division champions 2000–01
  - Division Two champions 1978–79
- Shropshire County Challenge Cup
  - Winners 1973–74, 1993–94, 1994–95 and 1996–97

== Club records ==
- Best league performance: 10th in Midland Football Alliance, 2001–02
- Best FA Cup performance: 2nd qualifying round, 2004–05
- Best FA Vase performance: 1st round, 2003–04 and 2004–05

== See also ==
- Shropshire#Football
