= Oldbury United F.C. =

Association football club in England

Coordinates: 52°30′38.38″N 2°03′00.64″W

Oldbury United
- Full name: Oldbury United Football Club
- Nickname: The Blues
- Founded: 1958; 68 years ago
- Ground: The Cricketts, Oldbury
- League: West Midlands (Regional) League Premier Division
- 2025–26: West Midlands (Regional) League Premier Division, 9th of 18
Home colours	Away colours

Oldbury United Football Club is a football club based in Oldbury, West Midlands, England. They are currently members of the West Midlands (Regional) League Premier Division.

== History ==
Oldbury United FC was formed in 1958 under the name of Queens Colts and played in the local Oldbury League. Queens Colts won the Oldbury League Division Two title in 1961-62 and subsequently changed their name to Whiteheath United, playing in the Warwickshire and West Midlands Alliance from 1962 to 1965. The club amalgamated with Oldbury Town in 1965; taking the name Oldbury United and joined the Worcestershire Combination (later Midland Football Combination) in 1966.

In 1973 the club acquired an old quarry off York Road and set about laying the pitch and building facilities. Floodlights were installed in 1982, commemorated with a visit by newly crowned European champions Aston Villa.

The club were league runners-up twice in the late 1970s and in 1982, despite only finishing fifth in the league, stepped up to the Southern League Midland Division.

In 1985–86 United finished bottom of the league and switched to the West Midlands (Regional) League where they enjoyed a number of successful seasons, including winning the championship in 1993. Based on this, in 1994 they became founder members of the Midland Alliance, where they have played ever since, with a best finish of third place.

Due to an ongoing legal dispute, Oldbury United began the 2008–09 season sharing The Beeches, home ground of Tividale. The legal dispute ended in the club folding at the end of the season. In 2017 the club was reformed, joining Division Two of the West Midlands (Regional) League.

== Honours ==
- West Midlands (Regional) League
  - Champions 1992–93
  - Runners-up 1986–87, 1987–88
- Midland Combination
  - Runners-up 1971–72, 1978–79
- Walsall Senior Cup
  - Winners 1983
- Staffordshire Senior Cup
  - Winners 1998
- Midland Alliance League Cup
  - Winners 1999

== Club records ==
- Best League performance: 6th in Southern League Midland Division, 1982–83
- Best FA Cup performance: 4th qualifying round, 1986–87
- Best FA Trophy performance: 3rd qualifying round, 1984–85
- Best FA Vase performance: 5th round, 1977–78
