= Gornal Athletic F.C. =

Association football club in England

Coordinates: 52°30′55.88″N 2°07′32.47″W

Gornal Athletic
- Full name: Gornal Athletic Football Club
- Nickname: The Peacocks
- Founded: 1945
- Ground: Garden Walk Stadium, Gornal
- Chairman: Thomas Williams
- Manager: Stuart How
- League: Midland League Division One
- 2024–25: Midland League Division One, 16th of 22
| Home colours | Away colours |

Gornal Athletic Football Club is a football club based in Lower Gornal, Dudley, in the West Midlands county in England. They are currently members of the Midland League Division One and play at the Garden Walk Stadium.

== History ==
The club was established in 1945 under the name Lower Gornal Athletic. They joined the Worcestershire Combination. They finished bottom of the league in 1954–55. In 1963 the club transferred to the West Midlands (Regional) League, although their reserve team remained in Division Two of the Worcestershire Combination. When the West Midlands (Regional) League gained a second division in 1965, the club became members of the Premier Division.

In 1972 the club were renamed Gornal Athletic. Although they finished bottom of the Premier Division in 1978–79, they avoided being relegated. However, the 1979–80 season saw them finish second-from-bottom of the division, resulting in relegation to Division One. The club were Division One runners-up in 1983–84, and after finishing as runners-up again in 1993–94, they were promoted back to the Premier Division.

Gornal Athletic finished bottom of the Premier Division in 2002–03 and were relegated to Division One South. However, they won the division at the first attempt, earning an immediate promotion back to the Premier Division. They went on to finish second in the Premier Division in 2005–06. The club were Premier Division champions in 2011–12 and were promoted to the Midland Alliance. However, they were relegated back to the West Midlands (Regional) League Premier Division at the end of the 2013–14 season. In 2016–17 they finished bottom of the Premier Division and were relegated to Division One.

In 2023–24 Gornal were runners-up in Division One of the West Midlands (Regional) League, earning promotion to Division One of the Midland League.

== Honours ==
- West Midlands (Regional) League
  - Premier Division champions 2011–12
  - Division One South champions 2003–04
- Worcestershire Junior Cup
  - Winners 1962–63

== Records ==
- Best FA Cup performance: Third qualifying round, 1975–76
- Best FA Trophy performance: Third qualifying round, 1971–72
- Best FA Vase performance: Quarter-finals, 2012–13
- Record transfer fee received: £2,100 from Cardiff City for George Andrews and Gary Bell, 1965–66

== See also ==
- Gornal Athletic F.C. players
