= Rushall Olympic F.C. =

Association football club in Walsall, England

Rushall Olympic
- Full name: Rushall Olympic Football Club
- Nickname: The Pics
- Founded: 1893; 133 years ago
- Ground: Dales Lane, Rushall, Walsall
- Capacity: 1,400
- Coordinates: 52°36′3″N 1°57′8″W
- Chairman: John Allen
- Manager: Ian Long
- League: Southern League Premier Division Central
- 2025–26: Northern Premier League Premier Division, 16th of 21 (transferred)
- Website: rofc.co.uk
Home colours	Away colours

Rushall Olympic Football Club is an English football club based in Rushall, a former mining village that forms part of the Metropolitan Borough of Walsall. The team competes in the Southern League Premier Division Central, the seventh tier of the English football league system.

== History ==
=== Early years ===
Football had been played in the village for at least 20 years previously; Rushall Rovers competed with Aston Villa in the 1870s but resigned from the Birmingham & District Football Association in September 1880. The earliest known reference to Rushall Olympic Football Club is in local newspaper reports on matches from the 1893–94 season. The club joined the Cannock & District League in 1895, finishing as runners-up in their first season and later joined the Junior (where they were champions in 1903–04), Amateur, Parks and Senior sections of the Walsall & District League.

During the inter-war years, the team won a number of local honours. At this time, the team comprised mainly local colliery workers and played on a field behind the Miners Arms pub in Rushall and changed in the pub itself. However, some time prior to the Second World War, the club disbanded.

=== Post-Second World War ===
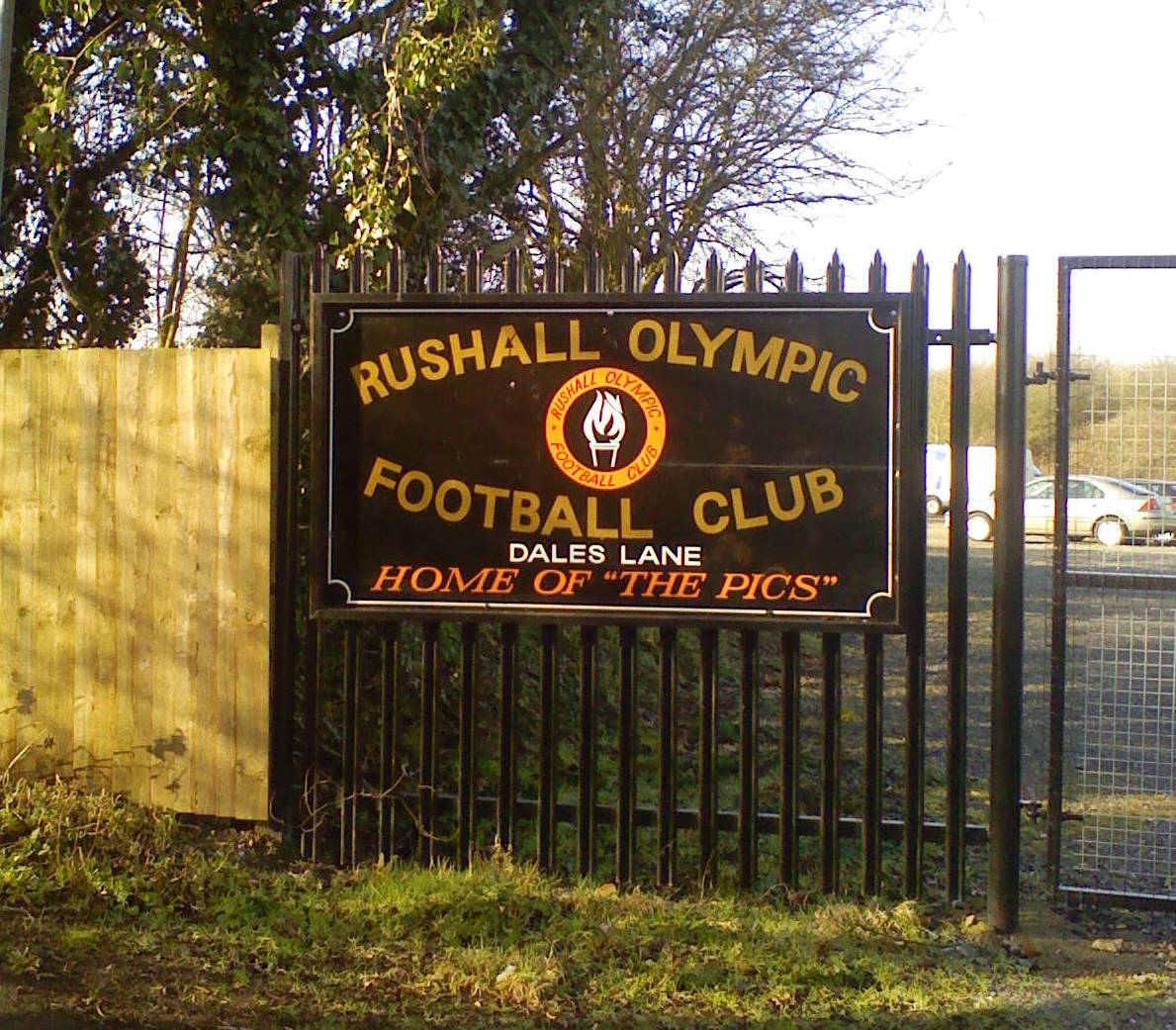
Dales Lane, home of the Pics

In 1951, a group of local young men decided to re-form the club. They approached the proprietor of a local fish and chip shop for permission to use his premises as their headquarters and secured the use of Rowley Place as a home ground. The club joined the Walsall & District Amateur League, where the team won the Second Division championship in 1952–53, and later the First Division championship in 1955–56, after which they gained promotion to the Staffordshire County League (South), where they won the Second Division title at the first attempt.

Following promotion to the First Division, the club won four championship titles between 1960 and 1965. In 1975, in a bid to gain a higher league status, the club decided to move three miles away to the Aston University Sports Ground, just off the main A34 Walsall to Birmingham road. Meanwhile, the club obtained the lease on some land in Daw End, Rushall, and the new Dales Lane ground was officially opened on 14 August 1977.

The club were accepted into the West Midlands (Regional) League in 1978, and won the First Division title in 1980. The club enjoyed 14 seasons of moderate success in the Premier Division, with a highest finish of fifth place achieved in 1988–89. In 1994, the "Pics" became founder members of the new Midland Football Alliance. Although the late 1990s brought only mid-table performances in the league, the Pics did defeat the then-Southern League club Rocester at the Bescot Stadium – home of Walsall – in a penalty shoot-out to lift the Walsall Senior Cup in 2000.

After finishing in second place in both 2000–01 and 2002–03, the Pics finally claimed the league title in 2004–05, and with it promotion to the Southern League Division One West. They were then transferred to the Southern League Division One Midlands for the 2006–07 season, where they stayed for two years, qualifying for the play-offs in their last season by finishing fifth.

Due to the restructuring of Northern Premier League Division One, they were transferred yet again to the NPL Division One South for the 2008–09 season, when they again finished fifth and qualified for the play-offs. They were also unsuccessful in achieving promotion this time. Manager Paul Holleran then left the club to be replaced by Neil Kitching, who started his first season brightly before tailing off to finish in mid-table; the team also reached the final of the Walsall Senior Cup under Kitching.

Despite further budget restriction, Kitching was supported by a relatively youthful backroom staff, including Nick Amos and Ian Cooper, and they went on to finish third in the 2010–11 season, before going on to reach the play-off final, after a 3–0 win over Brigg Town in the semi-final. A 2–0 victory over Grantham Town in the final saw Rushall Olympic reach the Northern Premier League Premier Division, the first time the club had ever reached the seventh level of the English football league system.

The first season at this higher level saw Rushall Olympic finish eighth in the league. They reached the final of three cup competitions: the league cup, where they lost to North Ferriby United after extra time; the Staffordshire Senior Cup, where they lost to Kidsgrove Athletic; and the Walsall Senior Cup, which they retained. Rushall also equalled their best ever performance in the FA Cup, reaching the fourth qualifying round, where they were knocked out by Stourbridge.

In 2012–13, Rushall made their debut in the first round proper of the FA Trophy, having qualified with victories over Woodford United, Chasetown and Droylsden. Their reward was a trip to Wrexham, where they suffered a defeat against a team that went on to win the final of the competition. In the league, Rushall again were on the verge of the play-offs finishing in sixth position, but failed to make the end of season competition.

In 2013–14, Rushall Olympic made the fourth qualifying round of the FA Cup before losing out at Grimsby Town. Rushall eventually finished in seventh place in the league, narrowly missing out on the play-offs. However, there were two cup final appearances, as the Pics lost out in the final of the Walsall Senior Cup but won the Staffordshire Senior Cup, beating Port Vale 2–1 at Vale Park. At the end of the season, the club parted company with manager of five years Neil Kitching; his assistant, Nick Amos, also left the club. Rushall then appointed former West Bromwich Albion and Bolton Wanderers midfielder Richard Sneekes as manager, with Steve Hinks as his assistant.

During the 2022-23 Southern Football League season, Olympic finished 5th in the table and qualified for the playoffs. The Pics defeated Coalville Town on penalty kicks and advanced to the playoff finals, where they defeated Nuneaton Borough, also on penalty kicks. As a result, the club was promoted to the National League North for the first time in club history.

== Players ==
As of 4 March 2026

Note: Flags indicate national team as defined under FIFA eligibility rules; some limited exceptions apply. Players may hold more than one non-FIFA nationality.

Pos.	Nation	Player
GK	ENG	Jake Laban (on loan from Harborough Town)
DF	ENG	Jordaan Brown
DF	ENG	Brad Burton
DF	ENG	Joel Kettle
DF	ENG	Camron McWilliams
DF	ENG	Max Ram
DF	ENG	Sam Whittall
DF	ENG	Jamie Willets
DF	NIR	Callum Wilson
MF	ENG	Nick Clayton-Phillips
MF	ENG	Fenton Heard

No.	Pos.	Nation	Player
MF	ENG	Daniel Jarvis	
MF	POL	Jakub Kruszynski (on loan from Mansfield Town)	
MF	ENG	Roddy McGlinchey	
MF	ENG	Alex Moore	
MF	ENG	Amari Osayande	
MF	POR	Aurio Teixeira	
FW	ENG	Dan Chimeziri (on loan from West Bromwich Albion)	
FW	ENG	Luke Enright	
FW	IRL	Liam McAlinden	
FW	ENG	Jamie Soule	

== Management and coaching staff ==
=== Boardroom ===
As of 20 September 2021

Position	Name
Chairman	(England) John Allen
Vice-Chairman	(England) Nick Allen

=== Current staff ===
Position	Name
Manager	(England) Ian Long
Assistant Manager	(England) Richard Colwell
First Team Coach	(Netherlands) Richard Sneekes

== Honours ==
- Northern Premier League Division One South
  - Play-off winners: 2010–11
- Midland Alliance
  - Champions: 2004–05
- West Midlands (Regional) League Division One
  - Champions: 1979–80
- Walsall Senior Cup
  - Winners: 1964–65, 1999–2000, 2008–09, 2010–11, 2011–12, 2022–23, 2023–24
- Staffordshire Senior Cup
  - Winners: 2005–06, 2013–14, 2015–16, 2022–23, 2023-2024
- Southern League Premier Division Central
  - Play-off winners: 2022–23

== Club records ==
- Best league performance: 19th in National League North, 2023–24
- Best FA Cup performance: First round proper, 2024–25
- Best FA Trophy performance: First round proper, 2012–13
- Best FA Vase performance: Fifth round, 2000–01

== See also ==
- Rushall Olympic F.C. players
- Rushall Olympic F.C. managers

== Sources ==
- Rushall Olympic at the Football Club History Database
