= Darlaston Town F.C. =

English association football club

Darlaston Town
- Full name: Darlaston Town Football Club
- Nickname: The Citizens
- Founded: 1874; 152 years ago (as Darlaston)
- Dissolved: 2013
- Ground: The City Ground; Darlaston
Home colours

Darlaston Town F.C. was a football club based in Darlaston, West Midlands, England.

== History ==
Formed in 1874, Darlaston was one of the oldest non league clubs in the country.

The team played their early football locally in the Wednesbury Junior League and Walsall & District League. In 1897–98 the Birmingham County Junior Cup was won 1–0 beating Hoobrook Olympic in the final. In the 1907–08 season Darlaston were members of the Birmingham Junior League which they won. The 1908–09 season saw Darlaston one of the founder members of the Birmingham Combination, winning it in season 1910–11. In the 1911–12 season Darlaston were promoted to the senior Birmingham & District League. Darlaston remained members of the District League until the end of the 1927–28 season when they returned to the Birmingham Combination.

During the Second World War the Combination ceased to run but on the return to normal Combination Football in season 1945–46, Darlaston were Champions. Darlaston remained in the Birmingham Combination until the end of the 1953–54 season when the league folded. With other clubs they then moved to the reorganised Birmingham & District League playing in Division One North.

The Birmingham & District League became the West Midlands (Regional) League in the 1962–63 season and Darlaston played in the Premier Division until 1981–82 when they were relegated. From the 1982–83 season they were members of Division One winning the division and promotion in 1989–90. The following season 1990–91 they finished 4th in the Premier Division. They also became the first side to win the Birmingham County FA Vase back to back in seasons 1990–91 and 1991–92.

Darlaston FC added Town to its name at the beginning of the 1996–97 season.

At the end of the 2001–02 season Darlaston were relegated to Division One after finishing 19th out of 24 clubs. In 2007 Darlaston gained promotion back to the Premier Division.

The club folded in 2013. A 'phoenix' club, named Darlaston Town 1874 now play in the Midland League Premier Division.

== Stadium ==
A grandstand was built at the club's City Ground in 1903 and this marked the beginning of a fine run of form for the team. In March 2009 Darlaston's home stadium, the City Ground, was attacked by vandals, who damaged the pitch and floodlights.

== Honours ==
- Birmingham County F.A Senior Cup
  - Winners – 1972–73
  - Runners-up – 1938–39, 1973–74
- Birmingham County F.A Vase
  - Winners – 1990–91, 1991–92
- Birmingham County F.A Junior Cup
  - Winners – 1897–98
- Walsall & District League
  - Champions – 1903–04, 1905–06
  - Runners-up – 1904–05, 1906–07
- Birmingham Combination
  - Champions – 1907–08, 1910–11, 1945–46
- West Midlands Regional League Division 1 North'
  - Champions – 1989–90, 2006–07
- Walsall Senior Cup
  - Winners – 1907–08
- Wednesbury Charity Cup
  - Record 18 wins and 3 shared in 32 finals
