= Great Wyrley F.C. =

Great Wyrley
- Full name: Great Wyrley Football Club
- Ground: Hazelbrook Ground; Great Wyrley; Staffordshire
- 2005–06: West Midlands (Regional) League; Premier Division, 3rd
Home colours	Away colours

Great Wyrley F.C. was a football club based in Great Wyrley, Staffordshire, England. They joined the West Midlands (Regional) League Division Two in 1980. For the 2006–07 season, they were members of the West Midlands (Regional) League Premier Division but resigned from the league in October having played only four matches.

== History ==
Great Wyrley joined the West Midlands (Regional) League in 1980 and won three divisional titles. In 2005 they gained promotion to the Premier Division for the first time and finished third in their first season in the top division, but financial problems at the start of the subsequent season led them to start the season late, fail to fulfil a number of fixtures, and ultimately withdraw from the league in October 2006.

They won the local JW Hunt Cup twice and the Staffordshire Challenge Vase on three occasions.

== Honours ==
- West Midlands (Regional) League
  - Division One champions 2004–05
  - Division One North champions 1996–97
  - Division Two champions 1982–83

== Club records ==
- Best league performance: 3rd in West Midlands (Regional) League Premier Division, 2005–06
- Best FA Cup performance: none
- Best FA Vase performance: none

== Sources ==
- Great Wyrley at the Football Club History Database
