= Hinckley Athletic F.C. =

Hinckley Athletic
- Full name: Hinckley Athletic Football Club
- Founded: 1906 (as Hinckley United)
- Dissolved: 1997 (merged with Hinckley Town to form Hinckley United)

Hinckley Athletic F.C. was an English association football club based in Hinckley, England.

== History ==
The club was formed as Hinckley United in 1906 after the dissolution of Hinckley Town. They played in the Leicestershire Senior League until 1914, when they joined the Birmingham Combination In 1925, a year after winning the Combination for the first time, they reached the last qualifying round of the FA Cup in 1925, losing 0–3 to Grimsby Town. They won their second Combination title in 1927.

After the end of World War II, the club changed its name to Hinckley Athletic. In 1955 they reached the 1st round proper of the FA Cup for the first time, eventually losing in the 2nd round to Rochdale. In 1959 they moved to play in the Southern League, and in 1963 again reached the 2nd round of the FA Cup, this time losing out to Queens Park Rangers. After a decade in the Southern League they moved back to the Combination, by now renamed the West Midlands (Regional) League.

In 1997 they merged with Hinckley Town to form Hinckley United.
