= Rocester F.C. =

Association football club in England

Coordinates: 52°57′01.28″N 1°49′53.97″W

Rocester
- Full name: Rocester Football Club
- Nickname: The Romans
- Founded: 1876
- Ground: Hillsfield Stadium, Mill Street, Rocester
- Capacity: 1,500 (213 seated)
- Chairman: Neil Smith
- Manager: Richard Wood
- League: Staffordshire County Senior League Premier Division
- 2025–26: Staffordshire County Senior League Premier Division, 9th of 18
- Website: rocesterfc.net
Home colours	Away colours

Rocester Football Club is a football club based in Rocester, near Uttoxeter, Staffordshire, England, currently playing in the Staffordshire County Senior League Premier Division.

== History ==
Rocester Football Club was formed in 1876 and for over a century played in various local leagues including the Stafford Amateur League and Uttoxeter and District League until they became founder members of the Staffordshire Senior League in the 1984. Under manager Alan Beaman, the club's first senior honours saw them win the double of the Staffordshire Senior League title and the Staffordshire F.A. Vase in 1986.

The following year, the club reached the last sixteen of the FA Vase (despite having to play all their "home" games at the grounds of teams with better facilities), knocking out the holders Halesowen Town before succumbing to Garforth Town. In 1987 the team moved from their original and by now rather run-down ground to a new home at Hillsfield and at the same time switched to the West Midlands (Regional) League Division One, which they won at the first attempt. The new ground was further developed with the addition of floodlights and a stand to enable the club to take its place in the Premier Division.

In 1994, following several successful seasons, Rocester became founder members of the new Midland Football Alliance. After a second-place finish in their first season in the new league, they went one better in 1998–99, winning the league title and claiming promotion to the Southern League Midland Division. They were to find life harder at this level, however, and after two consecutive last-place finishes the Romans were relegated back to the Alliance in 2002. Rocester soon recovered, however, and were champions at the first attempt in 2003–04. However, due to the re-organisation of the non-league pyramid, The Romans were placed in the Northern Premier League Division One, where they endured a disastrous season, picking up only 6 points from 42 games to finish rock-bottom.

The following season back in the Alliance saw the team continue their terrible run, their first win not coming until January, finally ending a run of 67 league matches without a win. After finishing bottom of the Midland Alliance the club only avoided a second successive relegation due to league restructuring.

However, within two years Rocester were back among the leading clubs in the Midland Alliance, finishing 12th in 2007 and 5th in 2008. The Romans recorded a 3–0 win over Kidsgrove Athletic at Vale Park in April 2008 to win the Staffordshire Senior Cup for the first time.

== Ground ==
The club moved to the Hillsfield ground in 1987, and its location on the site of a former Roman fort gave rise to the club's nickname of The Romans. The ground is situated adjacent to an imposing mill built in the 1780s by Richard Arkwright, inventor of the spinning frame. It was originally named Riversfield but renamed after Don Hill, a former club chairman.

== Honours ==
=== League ===
- Midland Alliance
  - Champions (2): 1998–99, 2003–04

=== Cup ===
- Staffordshire Senior Vase
  - Winners (1): 1985-86,
- Staffordshire Senior Cup
  - Winners (1): 2007–08,
- Staffs County Senior League - Leek Cup
  - Winners (1): 2023–24,
- Staffordshire Senior Vase
  - Runners Up (1): 2024–25

== Club records ==
- Record home attendance: 1,026 v Halesowen Town (FA Vase 4th Round, 1986–87) – played at Leek Town's ground
- Biggest home win: 14–0 v Bamfords S.C. 'A' (Stafford Amateur League Div. 3, 1953–54) and 14–0 v Eccleshall (Stafford Amateur League Div. 1, 1955–56)
- Biggest away win: 14–2 v R.A.F. Cheadle (Uttoxeter & District League, 1952–53)
- Biggest home defeat: 0–8 v Port Vale 'A' – (Staffordshire County League, 1957–58) and 0–9 v AFC Telford United – (Friendly, 2011–12)
- Biggest away defeat: 0–9 v Hanford B.C. (Staffordshire County League, 1971–72)
- Top goalscorer (season): Jack Harvey, 62 goals, 1955–56
- Top goalscorer (match): Reg Groombridge – 8 v Bamfords S.C. 'A' (1953–54) and Jack Harvey – 8 v Eccleshall (1955–56)
