= Tividale F.C. =

Association football club in England

Coordinates: 52°30′38.380″N 2°3′0.641″W

Tividale
- Full name: Tividale Football Club
- Nickname: The Dale
- Founded: 1954; 72 years ago
- Ground: The Beeches; Tividale; West Midlands
- Capacity: 2,800
- Manager: Jack Ball
- League: Midland League Premier Division
- 2025–26: Midland League Premier Division, 15th of 18
Home colours	Away colours

Tividale Football Club is a football club based in Tividale, near Dudley, West Midlands, England. They were established in 1954. In the 2011–12 season, under the management of Dean Whitehouse, they reached the 5th round of the FA Vase, the furthest the club has progressed in the competition. They won the Midland Football Alliance in 2013–14. They now play in the Midland League Premier Division, having been relegated from the Northern Premier League Division One South at the end of the 2015–16 season.

== History ==
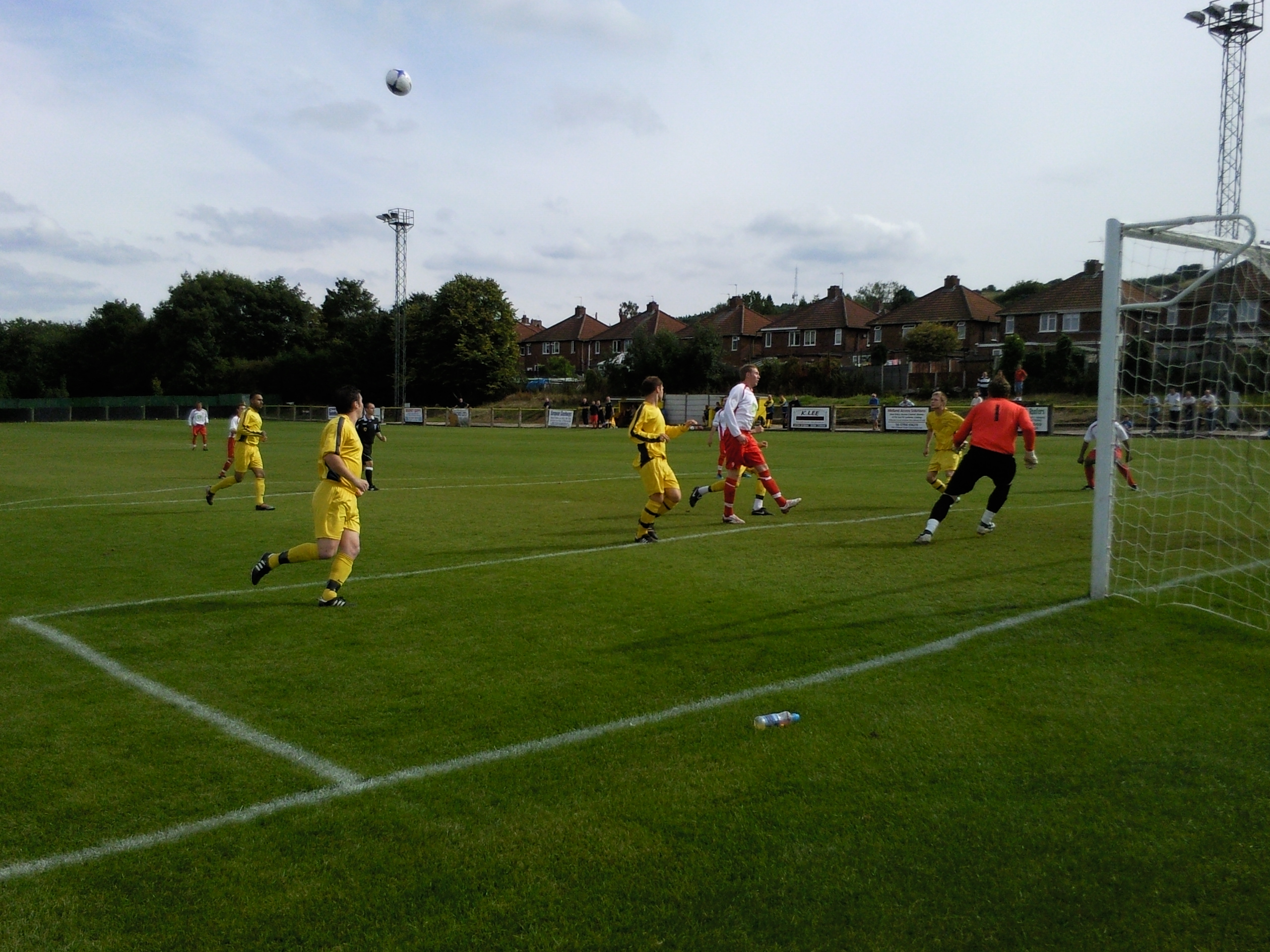
Tividale (yellow shirts) playing Oadby Town in the FA Vase in 2010

Tividale F.C. was formed in 1954 as the senior branch of Tividale Hall Youth Club F.C. and originally played in the Handsworth and District League, before moving on to the Warwickshire & West Midlands Alliance. In 1966, they joined the newly formed West Midlands (Regional) League Division One. In 1973, they gained promotion to the Premier Division and remained there for nearly 20 years, with a best-placed finish of 4th.

In the 1976–77 season, Tividale were the primary subject of a best-selling book, Journey to Wembley by Brian James, which charted that season's FA Cup tournament from the preliminary qualifying round to the final. It began at Tividale and focused on their progress through the competition until they were eliminated, the focus then shifting to the club that defeated them and so on till it ended with the eventual cupwinners.

In 1991, the club were relegated to Division One due to no longer being able to meet the required ground standards for the top division, and these events led to a number of management and playing staff leaving the club. New manager Terry Jones was able to turn the club's fortunes around and, in 1993, Tividale finished second in Division One and won promotion back into the Premier. Unfortunately in the same year the Midland Football Alliance was formed, moving the West Midlands League one step down the pyramid, so in a sense the club had not advanced.

Since their return to the Premier Division, Tividale have generally been a mid-table side, although, in 2001–02, they finished second, despite having three points deducted. Between 2002 and 2004, the club reached the final of the Walsall Senior Cup in three successive seasons, winning the trophy in 2003.

Ian Long joined as joint manager with Stuart Scriven in 2013. After Scriven left the club due to work commitments in 2013, Long assumed sole managership of the first team. In their first season in the Northern Premier League Division One South Tividale finished in 8th position. Long left his position as manager in May 2015, and was replaced by Philip Male and Ross Thorpe as joint managers.

With the loss of the complete 2014–15 squad with Long, the 2015–16 season proved a season too long and Tividale suffered relegation from the Northern Premier League. With outside commitments taking its toll Male decided to step down after the one season and so Tividale were looking for their third manager in three seasons. Relegation meant a return to Step 5 football in the newly formed Midland Football League Premier Division. The club next appointed the prolific Stourbridge Youth team manager Dave King as Tividale manager. However, the following season saw the team suffer another relegation and a return to the West Midlands (Regional) League. In the 2017–18 season, the club finished as runners up to Wolverhampton Sporting Community in the league, but the club was denied promotion. The team went one better in the 2018–19 season, winning the league by four points from second place Haughmond.

== Ground ==
Tividale moved to their current ground in Packwood Road in 1974, renaming it The Beeches. This name was chosen to honour a British Waterways official who had granted the site's lease to the club. The new ground was situated in a newly developed residential street on the Tividale Hall Estate on land which had previously been inaccessible to motor vehicles and which had required the demolition of four houses in order to open up the land for development.

In 1991, a new rule was introduced by the West Midlands League that all Premier Division clubs must have floodlights. As Tividale could not afford to erect lights at The Beeches, they had no option but to step down to Division One. Floodlights were eventually erected two years later.

More recent development work has seen the building of a 200-seater stand, new changing rooms, a boardroom, and the refurbishment of the Social Club. In spring 2014, the club achieved the ground grading that allowed them to play in the Northern Premier League Division One South for the 2014–15 season.

== Honours ==
- Midland Football Alliance
  - Champions, 2013–14
- West Midlands (Regional) League
  - Premier Division champions, 2010–11, 2018–19
  - Premier Division Cup winners, 2010–11
  - Premier Division runners-up, 2001–02
  - Division One champions, 1972–73
- J.W. Hunt Cup winners 2013–14
- Walsall Senior Cup
  - Winners, 2002–03
  - Runners-up, 2001–02, 2003–04

== Club records ==
- Best league performance: 8th in Northern Premier League Division One South, 2013–14
- Best FA Cup performance: 4th qualifying round, 1975–76
- Best FA Vase performance: 5th round, 2011–12

== Players ==
=== Current squad ===
As of 9 August 2024

Note: Flags indicate national team as defined under FIFA eligibility rules; some limited exceptions apply. Players may hold more than one non-FIFA nationality.

No.	Pos.	Nation	Player
—	GK	ENG	Ethan Hawkes
—	GK	ENG	Kieran Harrison
—	DF	ENG	Tom Rann
—	DF	ENG	Samuel Bratt-Wyton
—	DF	ENG	Matt Holland
—	DF	ENG	Brad Maslen-Jones (captain)
—	DF	ENG	Joseph Harrington
—	DF	ENG	Callum Lloyd
—	FW	ENG	Kyle Batchelor
—	MF	ENG	Brandon Mossini
—	MF	ENG	Eddie Rann
—	MF	ENG	Joseph Fitzpatrick
—	MF	ENG	Kyle Field
—	MF	ENG	Lewis Derrick
—	MF	ENG	Myles Durham
—	MF	ENG	Shakeel Brown
—	MF	ENG	Alfie Higgs
—	FW	ENG	Thomas Cottam
—	FW	ENG	Ezekiel Agyemang
—	FW	ENG	jack Storer
