= 1975–76 West Midlands (Regional) League =

The 1975–76 West Midlands (Regional) League season was the 76th in the history of the West Midlands (Regional) League, an English association football competition for semi-professional and amateur teams based in the West Midlands county, Shropshire, Herefordshire, Worcestershire and southern Staffordshire.

== Premier Division ==
West Midlands League Premier Division
- Season: 1975–76
- Champions: Alvechurch
- Matches: 342
- Goals: 955 (2.79 per match)

The Premier Division featured all the 16 clubs which competed in the division last season, along with three new clubs:

- Gresley Rovers, joined from the Central Alliance
- Staffordshire Police, promoted from Division One
- VS Rugby, transferred from the United Counties League

=== League table ===
| Pos | Team | Pld | W | D | L | GF | GA | GR | Pts |
|---|---|---|---|---|---|---|---|---|---|
| 1 | Alvechurch | 36 | 29 | 3 | 4 | 74 | 20 | 3.700 | 61 |
| 2 | Bilston | 36 | 24 | 6 | 6 | 74 | 25 | 2.960 | 54 |
| 3 | Dudley Town | 36 | 19 | 11 | 6 | 61 | 34 | 1.794 | 49 |
| 4 | Tividale | 36 | 21 | 7 | 8 | 75 | 46 | 1.630 | 49 |
| 5 | Lye Town | 36 | 16 | 13 | 7 | 60 | 36 | 1.667 | 45 |
| 6 | Darlaston | 36 | 18 | 9 | 9 | 59 | 42 | 1.405 | 45 |
| 7 | Brereton Social | 36 | 16 | 7 | 13 | 42 | 34 | 1.235 | 39 |
| 8 | Armitage | 36 | 15 | 9 | 12 | 64 | 52 | 1.231 | 39 |
| 9 | Hednesford Town | 36 | 12 | 13 | 11 | 61 | 52 | 1.173 | 37 |
| 10 | Coventry Sporting | 36 | 13 | 9 | 14 | 41 | 42 | 0.976 | 35 |
| 11 | Eastwood Hanley | 36 | 12 | 10 | 14 | 46 | 45 | 1.022 | 34 |
| 12 | Brierley Hill Alliance | 36 | 14 | 6 | 16 | 53 | 63 | 0.841 | 34 |
| 13 | Halesowen Town | 36 | 10 | 9 | 17 | 46 | 59 | 0.780 | 29 |
| 14 | Gresley Rovers | 36 | 8 | 11 | 17 | 51 | 65 | 0.785 | 27 |
| 15 | VS Rugby | 36 | 9 | 7 | 20 | 26 | 57 | 0.456 | 25 |
| 16 | Gornal Athletic | 36 | 10 | 5 | 21 | 32 | 71 | 0.451 | 25 |
| 17 | Hinckley Athletic | 36 | 6 | 9 | 21 | 21 | 69 | 0.304 | 21 |
| 18 | Staffordshire Police | 36 | 7 | 5 | 24 | 39 | 79 | 0.494 | 19 |
| 19 | Warley County Borough | 36 | 5 | 7 | 24 | 30 | 64 | 0.469 | 17 |

Source: nonleaguematters
Rules for classification: 1) points; 2) goal ratio.
