= 1974–75 West Midlands (Regional) League =

The 1974–75 West Midlands (Regional) League season was the 75th in the history of the West Midlands (Regional) League, an English association football competition for semi-professional and amateur teams based in the West Midlands county, Shropshire, Herefordshire, Worcestershire and southern Staffordshire.

== Premier Division ==
West Midlands League Premier Division
- Season: 1974–75
- Champions: Alvechurch
- Matches: 240
- Goals: 696 (2.9 per match)

The Premier Division featured 14 clubs which competed in the division last season, along with two new clubs:

- Armitage, promoted from Division One
- Hednesford, transferred from the Midland League, who also changed name to Hednesford Town

Also, Coventry Amateurs changed name to Coventry Sporting.

=== League table ===
Pos	Team	Pld	W	D	L	GF	GA	GR	Pts
1	Alvechurch	30	20	8	2	74	30	2.467	48
2	Brierley Hill Alliance	30	16	9	5	56	31	1.806	41
3	Lye Town	30	18	5	7	53	35	1.514	41
4	Brereton Social	30	14	9	7	40	30	1.333	37
5	Bilston	30	11	12	7	53	42	1.262	34
6	Dudley Town	30	12	10	8	47	38	1.237	34
7	Coventry Sporting	30	11	10	9	40	32	1.250	32
8	Darlaston	30	12	8	10	41	37	1.108	32
9	Hednesford Town	30	12	7	11	44	41	1.073	31
10	Eastwood Hanley	30	13	4	13	49	53	0.925	30
11	Armitage	30	10	7	13	45	50	0.900	27
12	Tividale	30	9	7	14	40	52	0.769	25
13	Warley County Borough	30	6	7	17	29	52	0.558	19
14	Gornal Athletic	30	6	6	18	26	59	0.441	18
15	Hinckley Athletic	30	5	7	18	29	47	0.617	17
16	Halesowen Town	30	3	8	19	30	67	0.448	14

Source: nonleaguematters
Rules for classification: 1) points; 2) goal ratio.
