= 1976–77 West Midlands (Regional) League =

The 1976–77 West Midlands (Regional) League season was the 77th in the history of the West Midlands (Regional) League, an English association football competition for semi-professional and amateur teams based in the West Midlands county, Shropshire, Herefordshire, Worcestershire and southern Staffordshire.

== Premier Division ==
West Midlands League Premier Division
- Season: 1976–77
- Champions: Alvechurch
- Matches: 420
- Goals: 1,127 (2.68 per match)

The Premier Division featured 19 clubs which competed in the division last season, along with two new clubs:

- Walsall reserves
- Willenhall Town, promoted from Division One

=== League table ===
Pos	Team	Pld	W	D	L	GF	GA	GD	Pts	Promotion or relegation
1	Alvechurch	40	29	6	5	74	20	+54	64	
2	Lye Town	40	26	5	9	76	35	+41	57	
3	Hednesford Town	40	22	13	5	59	31	+28	57	
4	Brereton Social	40	20	11	9	69	46	+23	51	
5	Dudley Town	40	18	11	11	65	41	+24	47	
6	VS Rugby	40	17	12	11	48	41	+7	46	
7	Tividale	40	15	14	11	47	37	+10	44	
8	Coventry Sporting	40	14	16	10	46	40	+6	44	
9	Armitage	40	15	13	12	67	57	+10	43	
10	Hinckley Athletic	40	14	15	11	59	54	+5	43	
11	Bilston	40	15	11	14	47	48	−1	41	
12	Darlaston	40	16	8	16	49	55	−6	40	
13	Warley County Borough	40	10	18	12	40	48	−8	38	Resigned from the league
14	Walsall reserves	40	11	14	15	49	58	−9	36	Resigned from the league
15	Willenhall Town	40	11	10	19	52	57	−5	32	
16	Eastwood Hanley	40	14	4	22	60	74	−14	32	
17	Gresley Rovers	40	8	13	19	54	66	−12	29	
18	Brierley Hill Alliance	40	7	15	18	46	78	−32	29	
19	Staffordshire Police	40	7	11	22	37	78	−41	25	
20	Gornal Athletic	40	5	13	22	37	76	−39	23	
21	Halesowen Town	40	5	9	26	46	86	−40	19	

Source: nonleaguematters
Rules for classification: 1) points; 2) goal difference; 3) number of goals scored.
