= 1973–74 West Midlands (Regional) League =

The 1973–74 West Midlands (Regional) League season was the 74th in the history of the West Midlands (Regional) League, an English association football competition for semi-professional and amateur teams based in the West Midlands county, Shropshire, Herefordshire, Worcestershire and southern Staffordshire.

== Premier Division ==
West Midlands League Premier Division
- Season: 1973–74
- Champions: Alvechurch
- Matches: 272
- Goals: 793 (2.92 per match)

The Premier Division featured 14 clubs which competed in the division last season, along with three new clubs:

- Alvechurch, transferred from the Midland Football Combination
- Coventry Amateurs, promoted from Division One
- Tividale, promoted from Division One

=== League table ===
Pos	Team	Pld	W	D	L	GF	GA	GR	Pts	Promotion or relegation
1	Alvechurch	32	23	5	4	89	24	3.708	51	
2	Bilston	32	25	1	6	75	28	2.679	51	
3	Brierley Hill Alliance	32	22	5	5	65	31	2.097	49	
4	Brereton Social	32	16	10	6	49	23	2.130	42	
5	Lye Town	32	17	8	7	57	31	1.839	42	
6	Hereford United reserves	32	17	5	10	62	43	1.442	39	Resigned from the league
7	Darlaston	32	13	12	7	40	31	1.290	38	
8	Dudley Town	32	16	4	12	49	42	1.167	36	
9	Warley County Borough	32	11	9	12	55	50	1.100	31	
10	Coventry Amateurs	32	10	10	12	39	41	0.951	30	
11	Halesowen Town	32	11	5	16	54	78	0.692	27	
12	Tividale	32	7	10	15	39	57	0.684	24	
13	Heanor Town	32	11	2	19	34	54	0.630	24	Transferred to the Midland League
14	Eastwood Hanley	32	8	6	18	32	70	0.457	22	
15	Hinckley Athletic	32	5	8	19	27	65	0.415	18	
16	GKN Sankeys	32	2	10	20	9	41	0.220	14	Resigned from the league
17	Gornal Athletic	32	0	6	26	18	84	0.214	6	

Source: nonleaguematters
Rules for classification: 1) points; 2) goal ratio.
