= 1972–73 West Midlands (Regional) League =

The 1972–73 West Midlands (Regional) League season was the 73rd in the history of the West Midlands (Regional) League, an English association football competition for semi-professional and amateur teams based in the West Midlands county, Shropshire, Herefordshire, Worcestershire and southern Staffordshire.

== Premier Division ==
West Midlands League Premier Division
- Season: 1972–73
- Champions: Bilston
- Matches: 240
- Goals: 724 (3.02 per match)

The Premier Division featured 12 clubs which competed in the division last season, along with four new clubs:

- Brereton Social, promoted from Division One
- Heanor Town, transferred from the Midland League
- Hereford United reserves
- Warley County Borough, promoted from Division One

Also, Lower Gornal Athletic changed name to Gornal Athletic.

=== League table ===
Pos	Team	Pld	W	D	L	GF	GA	GR	Pts	Promotion or relegation
1	Bilston	30	21	7	2	71	25	2.840	49	
2	Heanor Town	30	16	8	6	53	35	1.514	40	
3	Brereton Social	30	15	9	6	49	23	2.130	39	
4	Darlaston	30	12	11	7	58	34	1.706	35	
5	Brierley Hill Alliance	30	15	5	10	49	46	1.065	35	
6	Wolverhampton Wanderers "A"	30	14	6	10	54	44	1.227	34	Resigned to the Midland Football Combination Division Two
7	Eastwood Hanley	30	14	5	11	57	54	1.056	33	
8	Hereford United reserves	30	13	5	12	40	39	1.026	31	
9	Lye Town	30	13	4	13	54	46	1.174	30	
10	Warley County Borough	30	9	11	10	38	44	0.864	29	
11	Warley	30	6	12	12	46	49	0.939	24	Demoted to Division One
12	GKN Sankeys	30	8	8	14	29	43	0.674	24	
13	Gornal Athletic	30	8	7	15	25	53	0.472	23	
14	Halesowen Town	30	7	5	18	38	69	0.551	19	
15	Dudley Town	30	6	6	18	32	56	0.571	18	
16	Hinckley Athletic	30	5	7	18	31	64	0.484	17	

Source: nonleaguematters
Rules for classification: 1) points; 2) goal ratio.
