= 1977–78 West Midlands (Regional) League =

The 1977–78 West Midlands (Regional) League season was the 78th in the history of the West Midlands (Regional) League, an English association football competition for semi-professional and amateur teams based in the West Midlands county, Shropshire, Herefordshire, Worcestershire and southern Staffordshire.

== Premier Division ==
West Midlands League Premier Division
- Season: 1977–78
- Champions: Hednesford Town
- Promoted: Alvechurch
- Relegated: Staffordshire Police
- Matches: 342
- Goals: 1,012 (2.96 per match)

The Premier Division featured 19 clubs which competed in the division last season, no new clubs joined the Premier Division this season.

=== League table ===
Pos	Team	Pld	W	D	L	GF	GA	GD	Pts	Promotion or relegation
1	Hednesford Town	36	20	11	5	82	28	+54	51	
2	Alvechurch	36	20	10	6	71	33	+38	50	Promoted to the Southern Football League
3	Bilston	36	19	10	7	68	37	+31	48	
4	Lye Town	36	20	8	8	64	46	+18	48	
5	Willenhall Town	36	20	7	9	76	37	+39	47	
6	Eastwood Hanley	36	17	10	9	75	51	+24	44	Demoted to the Cheshire County League
7	Tividale	36	16	11	9	46	35	+11	43	
8	Hinckley Athletic	36	16	10	10	54	43	+11	42	
9	Halesowen Town	36	17	7	12	55	40	+15	41	
10	Dudley Town	36	14	13	9	53	42	+11	41	
11	Brereton Social	36	18	5	13	58	50	+8	41	
12	Armitage	36	13	12	11	63	53	+10	38	
13	VS Rugby	36	12	9	15	56	49	+7	33	
14	Brierley Hill Alliance	36	11	7	18	40	60	−20	29	
15	Gresley Rovers	36	9	7	20	44	66	−22	25	
16	Coventry Sporting	36	7	10	19	24	67	−43	24	
17	Darlaston	36	7	9	20	35	66	−31	23	
18	Gornal Athletic	36	2	5	29	26	116	−90	9	
19	Staffordshire Police	36	1	5	30	22	93	−71	7	Relegated to Division One

Source: nonleaguematters
Rules for classification: 1) points; 2) goal difference; 3) number of goals scored.
