= 2004–05 West Midlands (Regional) League =

The 2004–05 West Midlands (Regional) League season was the 105th in the history of the West Midlands (Regional) League, an English association football competition for semi-professional and amateur teams based in the West Midlands county, Shropshire, Herefordshire, Worcestershire and southern Staffordshire. It has three divisions, the highest of which is the Premier Division, which sits at step 6 of the National League System, or the tenth level of the overall English football league system.

== Premier Division ==
West Midlands League Premier Division
- Season: 2004–05
- Champions: Tipton Town
- Promoted: Tipton Town
- Matches: 380
- Goals: 1,328 (3.49 per match)

The Premier Division featured 18 clubs which competed in the division last season, along with three new clubs:

- Goodrich, promoted from Division One North
- Gornal Athletic, promoted from Division One South
- Pelsall Villa, relegated from the Midland Football Alliance

=== League table ===
Pos	Team	Pld	W	D	L	GF	GA	GD	Pts	Promotion or relegation
1	Tipton Town	38	31	3	4	111	19	+92	96	Promoted to the Midland Football Alliance
2	Market Drayton Town	38	23	6	9	76	47	+29	75	
3	Shawbury United	38	20	7	11	59	45	+14	67	
4	Ledbury Town	38	18	7	13	81	60	+21	61	
5	Wellington	38	18	6	14	84	65	+19	60	
6	Heath Hayes	38	18	6	14	67	54	+13	60	
7	Bromyard Town	38	16	8	14	67	62	+5	56	
8	Lye Town	38	16	8	14	63	59	+4	56	
9	Bustleholme	38	15	10	13	90	67	+23	55	
10	Gornal Athletic	38	15	9	14	55	47	+8	54	
11	Wolverhampton Casuals	38	15	9	14	67	73	−6	54	
12	Dudley Town	38	14	11	13	64	63	+1	53	
13	Kington Town	38	13	11	14	72	90	−18	50	
14	Smethwick Sikh Temple	38	15	4	19	60	71	−11	49	
15	Pelsall Villa	38	13	8	17	73	86	−13	47	
16	Tividale	38	12	10	16	56	69	−13	46	
17	Goodrich	38	11	11	16	40	60	−20	44	
18	Brierley & Hagley	38	7	9	22	46	86	−40	30	
19	Coseley Town	38	6	10	22	48	96	−48	28	Club folded
20	Wednesfield	38	4	7	27	49	109	−60	19	
21	Ettingshall Holy Trinity	0	0	0	0	0	0	0	0	Club folded, record expunged

Source: fchd
Rules for classification: 1) points; 2) goal difference; 3) number of goals scored.
