= 2005–06 Midland Football Alliance =

Midland Football Alliance
- Season: 2005–06
- Champions: Chasetown
- Promoted: Chasetown; Stourbridge; Malvern Town
- Matches: 462
- Goals: 1,414 (3.06 per match)

The 2005–06 Midland Football Alliance season was the 12th in the history of Midland Football Alliance, a football competition in England.

== Clubs and league table ==
The league featured 19 clubs from the previous season, along with three new clubs:

- Leamington, promoted from the Midland Football Combination
- Rocester, relegated from the Northern Premier League
- Tipton Town, promoted from the West Midlands (Regional) League

=== League table ===
Pos	Team	Pld	W	D	L	GF	GA	GD	Pts	Promotion or relegation
1	Chasetown	42	29	7	6	74	32	+42	94	Promoted to the Southern Football League
2	Stourbridge	42	29	5	8	110	55	+55	92	Promoted to the Southern Football League
3	Malvern Town	42	27	4	11	95	56	+39	85	Promoted to the Southern Football League
4	Romulus	42	23	11	8	84	49	+35	80	
5	Leamington	42	21	11	10	79	44	+35	74	
6	Racing Club Warwick	42	22	7	13	72	55	+17	73	
7	Quorn	42	21	6	15	71	51	+20	69	
8	Coalville Town	42	21	6	15	63	60	+3	69	
9	Barwell	42	20	8	14	83	66	+17	68	
10	Boldmere St. Michaels	42	17	12	13	60	48	+12	63	
11	Tipton Town	42	15	13	14	74	69	+5	58	
12	Oldbury United	42	16	10	16	58	58	0	58	
13	Loughborough Dynamo	42	16	8	18	53	53	0	56	
14	Alvechurch	42	16	7	19	59	64	−5	55	
15	Stratford Town	42	15	6	21	49	55	−6	51	
16	Studley	42	14	7	21	54	81	−27	49	
17	Biddulph Victoria	42	12	9	21	55	83	−28	45	
18	Oadby Town	42	10	14	18	50	64	−14	44	
19	Causeway United	42	9	7	26	49	89	−40	34	
20	Westfields	42	8	9	25	48	88	−40	33	
21	Cradley Town	42	5	9	28	38	94	−56	24	
22	Rocester	42	4	8	30	36	100	−64	20	

Source: fchd
Rules for classification: 1) points; 2) goal difference; 3) number of goals scored.
