= 1973–74 Midland Football League =

Midland Football League
- Season: 1973–74
- Champions: Alfreton Town
- Promoted: Worksop Town
- Matches: 272
- Goals: 782 (2.88 per match)

The 1973–74 Midland Football League season was the 74th in the history of the Midland Football League, a football competition in England.

== Clubs ==
The league featured 15 clubs which competed in the previous season, along with two new clubs:

- Clifton All Whites
- Ilkeston Town, relegated from the Southern Football League

== League table ==
| Pos | Team | Pld | W | D | L | GF | GA | GR | Pts | Qualification or relegation |
|---|---|---|---|---|---|---|---|---|---|---|
| 1 | Alfreton Town | 32 | 22 | 5 | 5 | 77 | 37 | 2.081 | 49 | |
| 2 | Worksop Town | 32 | 21 | 4 | 7 | 90 | 29 | 3.103 | 46 | Promoted to the Northern Premier League |
| 3 | Ashby Institute | 32 | 19 | 7 | 6 | 52 | 28 | 1.857 | 45 | |
| 4 | Arnold | 32 | 19 | 7 | 6 | 50 | 32 | 1.563 | 45 | |
| 5 | Frickley Colliery | 32 | 15 | 6 | 11 | 72 | 61 | 1.180 | 36 | |
| 6 | Sutton Town | 32 | 13 | 8 | 11 | 35 | 34 | 1.029 | 34 | |
| 7 | Boston | 32 | 12 | 7 | 13 | 47 | 46 | 1.022 | 31 | |
| 8 | Kimberley Town | 32 | 12 | 7 | 13 | 40 | 49 | 0.816 | 31 | |
| 9 | Long Eaton United | 32 | 11 | 8 | 13 | 41 | 47 | 0.872 | 30 | |
| 10 | Belper Town | 32 | 10 | 9 | 13 | 26 | 33 | 0.788 | 29 | |
| 11 | Eastwood Town | 32 | 9 | 10 | 13 | 34 | 51 | 0.667 | 28 | |
| 12 | Retford Town | 32 | 12 | 4 | 16 | 35 | 55 | 0.636 | 28 | |
| 13 | Bridlington Trinity | 32 | 12 | 3 | 17 | 50 | 62 | 0.806 | 27 | |
| 14 | Ilkeston Town | 32 | 9 | 9 | 14 | 41 | 54 | 0.759 | 27 | |
| 15 | Skegness Town | 32 | 8 | 7 | 17 | 32 | 45 | 0.711 | 23 | |
| 16 | Clifton All Whites | 32 | 8 | 6 | 18 | 30 | 55 | 0.545 | 22 | |
| 17 | Hednesford | 32 | 4 | 5 | 23 | 30 | 64 | 0.469 | 13 | Transferred to the West Midlands (Regional) League |

Source: nonleaguematters
Rules for classification: 1) points; 2) goal difference; 3) number of goals scored.
The points system until the 1990–91 season: 2 points for a win, 1 point for a draw and 0 points for losing.
