= 2003–04 Midland Football Alliance =

Midland Football Alliance
- Season: 2003–04
- Champions: Rocester
- Promoted: Rocester; Willenhall Town
- Relegated: Pelsall Villa; Stafford Town
- Matches: 552
- Goals: 1,715 (3.11 per match)

The 2003–04 Midland Football Alliance season was the tenth in the history of Midland Football Alliance, a football competition in England.

== Clubs and league table ==
The league featured 19 clubs from the previous season, along with five new clubs:

- Alvechurch, promoted from the Midland Football Combination
- Coalville Town, promoted from the Leicestershire Senior League
- Racing Club Warwick, relegated from the Southern Football League
- Rocester, relegated from the Southern Football League
- Westfields, promoted from the West Midlands (Regional) League

=== League table ===
Pos	Team	Pld	W	D	L	GF	GA	GD	Pts	Promotion or relegation
1	Rocester	46	28	12	6	96	45	+51	96	Promoted to the Northern Premier League Division One
2	Willenhall Town	46	27	13	6	114	49	+65	94	Promoted to the Northern Premier League Division One
3	Stratford Town	46	28	8	10	89	45	+44	92	
4	Quorn	46	26	12	8	84	47	+37	90	
5	Studley	46	26	7	13	96	52	+44	85	
6	Oadby Town	46	23	8	15	90	56	+34	77	
7	Chasetown	46	22	11	13	68	50	+18	77	
8	Coalville Town	46	20	12	14	87	61	+26	72	
9	Stourbridge	46	19	15	12	74	52	+22	72	
10	Bridgnorth Town	46	20	12	14	76	66	+10	72	
11	Oldbury United	46	19	14	13	72	55	+17	71	
12	Racing Club Warwick	46	20	9	17	64	63	+1	69	
13	Westfields	46	20	6	20	67	61	+6	66	
14	Rushall Olympic	46	15	16	15	58	55	+3	61	
15	Boldmere St. Michaels	46	17	9	20	76	77	−1	60	
16	Biddulph Victoria	46	16	12	18	66	74	−8	60	
17	Causeway United	46	15	11	20	66	82	−16	56	
18	Barwell	46	15	9	22	63	75	−12	54	
19	Alvechurch	46	12	14	20	67	87	−20	50	
20	Ludlow Town	46	12	11	23	56	84	−28	47	
21	Grosvenor Park	46	9	9	28	53	79	−26	36	Resigned from the league
22	Cradley Town	46	8	12	26	60	92	−32	36	
23	Pelsall Villa	46	7	7	32	46	132	−86	28	Relegated to the West Midlands (Regional) League Premier Division
24	Stafford Town	46	1	5	40	27	176	−149	8	Demoted to the West Midlands (Regional) League Division One

Source: fchd
Rules for classification: 1) points; 2) goal difference; 3) number of goals scored.
