= 1971–72 Midland Football League =

Midland Football League
- Season: 1971–72
- Champions: Grantham
- Promoted: Grantham
- Matches: 306
- Goals: 985 (3.22 per match)

The 1971–72 Midland Football League season was the 72nd in the history of the Midland Football League, a football competition in England.

== Clubs ==
The league featured 15 clubs which competed in the previous season, along with three new clubs:

- Eastwood Town
- Gateshead
- Kimberley Town

== League table ==
| Pos | Team | Pld | W | D | L | GF | GA | GR | Pts | Qualification or relegation |
|---|---|---|---|---|---|---|---|---|---|---|
| 1 | Grantham | 34 | 25 | 5 | 4 | 106 | 32 | 3.313 | 55 | Promoted to the Southern Football League |
| 2 | Alfreton Town | 34 | 22 | 5 | 7 | 85 | 39 | 2.179 | 49 | |
| 3 | Skegness Town | 34 | 18 | 8 | 8 | 62 | 34 | 1.824 | 44 | |
| 4 | Long Eaton United | 34 | 16 | 10 | 8 | 49 | 38 | 1.289 | 42 | |
| 5 | Belper Town | 34 | 16 | 9 | 9 | 46 | 33 | 1.394 | 41 | |
| 6 | Worksop Town | 34 | 17 | 7 | 10 | 70 | 53 | 1.321 | 41 | |
| 7 | Arnold | 34 | 18 | 4 | 12 | 70 | 54 | 1.296 | 40 | |
| 8 | Gateshead | 34 | 17 | 5 | 12 | 60 | 53 | 1.132 | 39 | |
| 9 | Frickley Colliery | 34 | 13 | 8 | 13 | 46 | 43 | 1.070 | 34 | |
| 10 | Boston | 34 | 13 | 7 | 14 | 44 | 48 | 0.917 | 33 | |
| 11 | Sutton Town | 34 | 10 | 11 | 13 | 47 | 52 | 0.904 | 31 | |
| 12 | Retford Town | 34 | 11 | 8 | 15 | 61 | 69 | 0.884 | 30 | |
| 13 | Eastwood Town | 34 | 9 | 9 | 16 | 50 | 65 | 0.769 | 27 | |
| 14 | Ashby Institute | 34 | 10 | 7 | 17 | 47 | 62 | 0.758 | 27 | |
| 15 | Heanor Town | 34 | 11 | 5 | 18 | 51 | 68 | 0.750 | 27 | Transferred to the West Midlands (Regional) League |
| 16 | Kimberley Town | 34 | 7 | 8 | 19 | 31 | 73 | 0.425 | 22 | |
| 17 | Stamford | 34 | 5 | 9 | 20 | 33 | 71 | 0.465 | 19 | Transferred to the United Counties League |
| 18 | Loughborough United | 34 | 5 | 1 | 28 | 27 | 98 | 0.276 | 11 | |

Source: nonleaguematters
Rules for classification: 1) points; 2) goal difference; 3) number of goals scored.
The points system until the 1990–91 season: 2 points for a win, 1 point for a draw and 0 points for losing.
