= 2004–05 Northern Premier League =

The 2004–05 Northern Premier League season was the 37th in the history of the Northern Premier League, a football competition in England. Teams were divided into two divisions; the Premier and the First. This was the first Northern Premier League system after the creation of Conference North and Conference South.

== Premier Division ==
Northern Premier League Premier Division
- Season: 2004–05
- Champions: Hyde United
- Promoted: Hyde United; Workington
- Relegated: Bamber Bridge; Bishop Auckland; Bridlington Town
- Matches: 456
- Goals: 1,427 (3.13 per match)

Due to a restructuring of the league system in which the new leagues Conference North and Conference South, the league featured 14 new teams promoted from Division One:

- Bamber Bridge
- Bishop Auckland
- Bridlington Town
- Farsley Celtic
- Gateshead
- Guiseley
- Hyde United promoted as champions of Division One
- Leek Town
- Lincoln United
- Matlock Town
- Ossett Town
- Prescot Cables
- Witton Albion
- Workington

=== League table ===
Pos	Team	Pld	W	D	L	GF	GA	GD	Pts	Promotion or relegation
1	Hyde United (C, P)	42	25	13	4	80	43	+37	88	Promotion to Conference North
2	Workington (P)	42	26	7	9	73	30	+43	85	Qualification for Play-offs
3	Farsley Celtic	42	25	8	9	81	41	+40	83	Qualification for Play-offs
4	Whitby Town	42	23	11	8	65	49	+16	80	Qualification for Play-offs
5	Prescot Cables	42	21	8	13	63	54	+9	71	Qualification for Play-offs
6	Burscough	42	21	7	14	93	74	+19	70	
7	Leek Town	42	16	15	11	63	52	+11	63	
8	Witton Albion	42	15	17	10	56	44	+12	62	
9	Radcliffe Borough	42	16	14	12	60	60	0	62	
10	Guiseley	42	16	13	13	70	64	+6	61	
11	Matlock Town	42	14	13	15	59	67	−8	55	
12	Blyth Spartans	42	13	13	16	53	55	−2	52	
13	Wakefield-Emley	42	14	10	18	60	67	−7	52	
14	Lincoln United	42	15	4	23	53	66	−13	49	
15	Marine	42	10	18	14	53	60	−7	48	
16	Ossett Town	42	11	13	18	53	62	−9	46	
17	Gateshead	42	11	12	19	61	84	−23	45	
18	Frickley Athletic	42	10	14	18	44	57	−13	44	
19	Bishop Auckland (R)	42	11	7	24	51	74	−23	40	Relegation to NPL Division One
20	Bridlington Town (R)	42	7	14	21	43	66	−23	35	Relegation to NPL Division One
21	Bamber Bridge (R)	42	9	7	26	48	92	−44	34	Relegation to NPL Division One
22	Spennymoor United	42	9	10	23	44	65	−21	25 (Note: Spennymoor United were docked 12 points for failing to fulfil their fixture list. Their resignation from the League after 33 matches caused the Northern Premier League controversy of 2005.)	Resigned after 33 games

Updated to match(es) played on 8 February 2011. Source:
Rules for classification: 1) points; 2) goal difference; 3) number of goals scored.
(C) Champions; (P) Promoted; (R) Relegated

=== Results ===
Home \ Away	BAM	BIS	BLY	BRI	BUR	FAR	FRK	GAT	GUI	HYD	LEE	LIN	MAR	MAT	OST	PRC	RAD	SPU	W&E	WTB	WTN	WRK
Bamber Bridge		0–0	1–3	2–1	2–3	1–2	2–0	0–2	2–1	0–4	0–4	2–3	2–1	0–1	3–3	0–2	0–3	1–1	3–2	1–2	1–1	0–2
Bishop Auckland	3–0		1–1	2–3	1–2	0–1	2–1	4–3	1–1	0–2	1–3	1–2	2–1	4–1	1–0	1–3	4–0	4–2	1–3	1–1	0–1	0–2
Blyth Spartans	0–1	3–0		5–1	2–4	1–4	1–1	2–0	2–2	0–2	0–1	2–0	1–0	1–1	0–1	0–2	2–0	1–0	5–2	2–2	2–1	1–0
Bridlington Town	2–2	2–2	1–1		0–1	0–2	1–1	2–1	4–1	1–2	0–0	1–2	1–1	0–2	1–1	2–0	0–3	1–2	1–0	0–0	0–0	0–0
Burscough	4–0	4–0	0–1	0–4		1–4	2–1	3–2	3–2	4–0	0–0	7–3	1–3	3–0	5–3	3–5	2–4	5–0	3–3	5–1	1–1	1–3
Farsley Celtic	5–1	2–0	1–1	3–1	1–2		2–1	1–0	3–1	2–0	2–3	1–0	0–0	4–0	2–0	0–0	1–1	1–1	5–0	1–2	0–1	0–2
Frickley Athletic	1–0	1–0	2–0	3–1	2–1	2–4		1–1	0–1	1–2	0–2	1–0	1–1	1–5	1–1	1–1	2–3	1–1	1–2	1–1	2–1	0–1
Gateshead	2–2	1–1	2–1	2–2	3–3	1–0	1–1		2–1	1–3	2–2	2–3	1–3	2–1	3–3	1–1	0–1	5–1	2–1	0–3	2–1	1–1
Guiseley	4–2	5–2	2–1	3–1	3–1	2–2	0–0	1–2		1–1	2–1	1–1	1–2	2–4	0–0	2–3	4–3	3–2	1–0	1–1	1–1	1–3
Hyde United	2–1	1–0	3–0	2–1	6–1	2–4	1–1	4–0	3–1		1–1	1–1	1–0	2–2	2–0	2–2	3–0		2–1	2–2	1–0	1–0
Leek Town	4–2	2–1	0–0	2–1	2–0	1–1	1–2	5–0	1–3	2–2		0–2	0–2	2–2	2–0	1–1	0–0		0–0	4–0	2–2	1–1
Lincoln United	2–0	1–2	1–0	2–1	2–3	0–1	3–0	1–2	0–1	1–2	2–3		4–1	3–0	2–1	0–3	1–2		1–2	0–1	1–5	3–2
Marine	3–3	4–1	0–0	1–1	1–1	2–1	1–1	4–2	0–0	2–2	2–2	2–2		1–1	3–1	0–2	1–3		1–2	2–3	1–1	1–2
Matlock Town	3–2	0–2	0–0	0–0	3–1	1–2	1–1	1–1	1–1	1–1	3–2	2–1	1–3		1–0	0–1	3–0	2–3	2–1	1–1	1–4	1–2
Ossett Town	2–3	1–1	1–1	5–1	0–0	1–2	2–1	1–0	1–0	2–4	3–0	1–0	3–0	1–1		0–2	0–2	4–3	2–1	2–1	1–2	0–1
Prescot Cables	2–1	2–1	2–1	3–2	1–3	1–4	0–2	3–1	0–1	0–1	2–1	1–0	0–0	2–3	2–1		2–2		3–0	0–2	1–1	1–4
Radcliffe Borough	1–2	3–2	1–1	1–1	1–2	0–2	0–0	3–0	1–4	1–0	1–1	1–1	2–2	1–1	2–2	2–1		2–2	3–2	0–1	1–1	0–2
Spennymoor United	0–3	5–0	2–3		2–1	1–0	0–2	2–2	3–3	1–3		1–0	0–0	0–2	0–0				5–2	1–0	0–0	1–5
Wakefield & Emley	4–0	0–2	3–1	2–0	0–0	2–3	1–0	1–3	1–3	3–3	2–1	3–0	0–0	1–2	2–2	2–1	1–2	3–0		0–0	1–0	1–1
Whitby Town	3–0	2–0	4–2	0–0	1–4	2–1	3–1	3–2	2–1	1–1	2–0	1–0	2–1	3–2	1–0	3–2	0–2	0–0	1–2		2–2	0–1
Witton Albion	2–0	1–0	2–2	1–0	0–3	2–2	2–1	4–1	0–0	1–1	1–3	1–0	3–0	1–0	0–0	1–3	4–1	1–2	1–1	0–2		1–0
Workington	2–0	1–0	1–0	2–1	1–0	1–2	2–1	3–0	1–2	0–2	4–1	1–2	3–0	4–0	3–1	2–0	0–0	5–0	0–0	1–2	1–1	

Updated to match(es) played on 30 April 2005. Source: Northern Premier Division results grid
Legend: Blue = home team win; Yellow = draw; Red = away team win.

=== Play-offs ===
The Premier Division play-offs saw the second to fifth placed sides in the Division compete for one place in the Conference North.

Semi-finals; 14 May 2005
3	Farsley Celtic	1*
4	Whitby Town	0
2	Workington	3
5	Prescot Cables	1

Final; 17 May 2005
3	Farsley Celtic	0(5)
2	Workington	0(6)

* After extra time

== Division One ==
Northern Premier League Division One
- Season: 2004–05
- Champions: North Ferriby United
- Promoted: Ilkeston Town; North Ferriby United; A.F.C. Telford United
- Relegated: None
- Matches: 465
- Goals: 1,394 (3 per match)

Division One featured 14 new teams due to the creation of Conference North and Conference South:

- Rocester from the Midland Football Alliance
- Willenhall Town from the Midland Football Alliance
- Brigg Town from the Northern Counties East League Premier Division
- Eastwood Town from the Northern Counties East League Premier Division
- Ossett Albion from the Northern Counties East League Premier Division
- Spalding United from the United Counties League Premier Division
- Clitheroe from the North West Counties League Division One
- Mossley from the North West Counties League Division One
- Warrington Town from the North West Counties League Division One
- Woodley Sports from the North West Counties League Division One
- Gresley Rovers from the Southern League Western Division
- Ilkeston Town from the Southern League Western Division
- Shepshed Dynamo from the Southern League Western Division
- A.F.C. Telford United as a new club

=== League table ===
Pos	Team	Pld	W	D	L	GF	GA	GD	Pts	Promotion or relegation
1	North Ferriby United (C, P)	42	25	8	9	83	49	+34	83	Promotion to NPL Premier Division
2	Ilkeston Town (P)	42	24	9	9	64	40	+24	81	Promotion to NPL Premier Division
3	A.F.C. Telford United (P)	42	23	11	8	78	44	+34	80	Qualification for Play-offs
4	Willenhall Town	42	22	12	8	71	46	+25	78	Qualified for Play-offs, then transferred in Southern League Western Division
5	Kendal Town	42	21	8	13	89	69	+20	71	Qualification for Play-offs
6	Eastwood Town	42	20	9	13	73	54	+19	69	Qualification for Play-offs
7	Mossley	42	20	6	16	81	56	+25	66	
8	Brigg Town	42	15	19	8	59	46	+13	64	
9	Gresley Rovers	42	17	12	13	57	53	+4	63	
10	Kidsgrove Athletic	42	15	15	12	60	55	+5	60	
11	Woodley Sports	42	16	11	15	68	74	−6	59	
12	Ossett Albion	42	15	13	14	83	74	+9	58	
13	Colwyn Bay	42	14	13	15	54	62	−8	55	
14	Stocksbridge Park Steels	42	15	9	18	58	58	0	51 (Note: Stocksbridge Park Steels were docked 3 points.)	
15	Shepshed Dynamo	42	13	11	18	53	75	−22	50	
16	Chorley	42	13	9	20	62	69	−7	48	
17	Belper Town	42	13	8	21	57	66	−9	47	
18	Spalding United	42	13	8	21	57	69	−12	47	
19	Clitheroe	42	12	10	20	47	57	−10	46	
20	Warrington Town	42	11	13	18	45	59	−14	46	
21	Rossendale United	42	10	10	22	64	87	−23	40	
22	Rocester (R)	42	0	6	36	31	132	−101	6	Relegated to Midland Alliance

Rules for classification: 1) points; 2) goal difference; 3) number of goals scored.
(C) Champions; (P) Promoted; (R) Relegated

=== Results ===
Home \ Away	TEL	BLP	BRG	CHO	CLT	COL	EAS	GRE	ILK	KEN	KID	MOS	NFU	OSA	ROC	ROS	SPD	SPA	STO	WAR	WIL	WDL
A.F.C. Telford United		4–0	0–2	3–0	0–2	1–0	2–0	3–1	1–0	4–1	0–2	2–0	2–2	3–3	2–0	1–1	2–0	0–0	1–3	1–1	2–2	1–0
Belper Town	1–1		1–2	4–2	1–0	0–0	1–2	0–1	0–0	2–3	2–2	1–1	2–5	1–2	2–0	2–2	0–1	3–2	3–4	0–3	0–2	0–0
Brigg Town	2–2	1–3		0–2	1–1	1–0	0–0	2–1	1–2	3–1	4–0	3–1	2–0	1–1	1–1	1–5	1–1	3–0	1–0	1–0	3–3	2–2
Chorley	1–3	1–2	1–1		2–0	3–2	1–2	3–1	0–1	2–0	1–1	1–0	0–1	3–2	3–0	0–3	5–0	1–1	0–1	1–2	2–1	2–3
Clitheroe	1–1	0–1	0–0	3–1		0–0	0–1	1–2	0–1	0–5	0–1	2–4	2–1	1–2	6–0	4–1	2–0	2–1	2–0	0–1	1–1	1–1
Colwyn Bay	0–3	1–0	1–1	4–1	0–0		1–1	1–1	0–1	1–0	0–0	2–1	2–1	1–5	2–1	1–1	3–0	2–0	2–0	1–3	1–4	2–4
Eastwood Town	1–0	3–1	1–1	1–3	3–2	4–0		2–2	0–1	4–0	1–2	1–1	0–3	1–1	2–0	1–0	4–1	6–0	2–2	2–0	1–2	3–1
Gresley Rovers	0–2	1–0	1–0	2–2	2–0	2–1	1–2		1–1	2–2	4–1	3–0	2–3	2–1	2–0	2–2	1–1	1–3	1–0	1–0	1–4	2–1
Ilkeston Town	2–3	2–0	2–2	1–0	1–1	4–0	1–0	0–1		1–3	2–1	2–1	1–1	2–1	2–2	5–3	3–0	1–0	2–1	0–0	1–0	3–2
Kendal Town	4–2	0–2	2–2	4–0	1–2	3–2	3–0	1–2	2–1		4–1	1–2	1–1	1–1	5–1	5–1	0–0	3–2	3–2	0–0	2–1	5–1
Kidsgrove Athletic	2–2	1–0	1–1	2–1	0–1	1–1	2–1	1–1	1–1	4–0		4–4	1–1	3–2	2–2	3–0	1–1	0–2	0–1	1–2	0–3	3–2
Mossley	0–1	0–1	2–1	2–1	3–0	4–0	3–1	0–1	0–2	1–1	0–2		1–2	0–1	5–1	5–4	0–1	3–1	2–0	4–1	2–2	1–0
North Ferriby United	1–0	2–1	0–0	3–0	3–1	1–1	4–0	2–2	3–0	6–0	0–1	2–4		3–1	2–1	1–0	3–0	1–3	1–0	3–2	0–1	3–2
Ossett Albion	1–2	2–8	1–1	1–1	3–0	0–2	3–3	2–1	1–4	2–3	2–2	1–4	1–2		6–1	3–1	6–0	2–1	1–0	1–1	1–1	3–3
Rocester	3–5	0–2	0–3	3–3	0–1	0–3	1–6	0–0	0–3	0–4	0–6	0–4	0–4	0–3		1–4	2–3	2–4	0–4	1–1	1–2	2–3
Rossendale United	1–1	1–4	0–1	2–2	2–3	1–1	2–3	1–2	1–0	1–3	2–1	2–5	1–2	2–3	3–2		2–0	0–4	2–3	2–1	0–1	0–1
Shepshed Dynamo	1–2	2–2	2–0	0–2	4–2	2–2	0–1	3–2	0–1	1–3	0–1	0–1	2–1	4–3	5–2	1–1		3–2	1–1	4–2	2–3	0–0
Spalding United	1–2	1–2	2–1	1–0	1–0	1–4	0–2	1–0	1–2	3–1	1–0	2–2	2–3	1–3	3–1	1–1	1–1		2–3	1–1	1–1	0–1
Stocksbridge Park Steels	1–2	3–1	2–3	0–0	1–0	0–1	2–0	2–1	2–2	1–2	0–0	1–5	0–1	2–2	2–0	3–0	1–2	0–0		2–1	1–0	2–3
Warrington Town	0–5	1–0	0–2	2–2	1–1	0–0	2–2	2–1	1–2	0–4	0–1	1–0	1–1	0–0	4–0	2–3	2–0	0–1	1–1		1–5	2–0
Willenhall Town	1–0	2–0	1–1	0–3	1–0	2–4	2–0	0–0	2–1	3–1	2–1	1–0	2–3	0–2	3–0	1–1	1–1	2–1	1–1	1–0		2–1
Woodley Sports	0–4	3–1	0–0	4–3	2–2	4–2	0–3	0–0	1–0	2–2	1–1	0–3	4–1	2–1	2–0	1–2	1–3	3–2	4–3	1–0	2–2	

Updated to match(es) played on 30 April 2005. Source: Northern Premier League First Division results grid
Legend: Blue = home team win; Yellow = draw; Red = away team win.

=== Play-offs ===
The First Division play-offs saw the third to sixth placed sides in the First Division compete for a place in the Premier Division.

Semi-finals; 2 May 2005
4	Willenhall Town	0
5	Kendal Town	1
3	A.F.C. Telford United	1
6	Eastwood Town	0

Final; 7 May 2005
5	Kendal Town	1
3	A.F.C. Telford United	2

== Promotion and relegation ==
In the thirty-seventh season of the Northern Premier League Hyde United were promoted as champions while Workington were promoted as play-off winners, where they would both be promoted to the Conference North. Bishop Aukland, Bridlington Town, Bamber Bridge and Spennymoor United were relegated to the First Division; these four clubs were replaced by relegated Conference North sides Runcorn Halton, Ashton United and Bradford Park Avenue. First Division winners North Ferriby United, second placed Ilkeston Town and play-off winners A.F.C. Telford United were all promoted to the Premier Division. In the First Division Rocester were relegated and were replaced by Goole and Fleetwood Town.

== Cup Results ==
Challenge Cup: Teams from both leagues.

- Matlock Town 2–2 (3–1 Pens) Whitby Town

President's Cup: 'Plate' competition for losing teams in the NPL Cup.

- Bamber Bridge 1–1 2–1 (3–2 agg.) Witton Albion

Chairman's Cup: 'Plate' competition for losing teams in the NPL Cup.

- Kidsgrove Athletic 3–3 4–3 (7–6 agg.) Woodley Sports

Peter Swales Shield: Between Champions of NPL Premier Division and Winners of the NPL Cup.

- Hyde United bt. Matlock Town

== 2005 Northern Premier League Controversy ==
=== NPL meeting ===
The end of this season saw Spennymoor United fail to fulfil nine of their league fixtures after folding. The Northern Premier League's Board of Directors met on 24 April 2005 to consider how these unplayed games would be treated in the fairest possible manner to all Premier Division member clubs. At this meeting it was decided to expunge the record of Spennymoor United from the table. Subsequent to this meeting the member clubs of Gateshead, Radcliffe Borough, Hyde United and Workington appealed to the Football Association (the FA) against the decision.

One of the grounds of appeal was that the meeting did not have a quorum and the FA recommended that the Northern Premier League withdraw their decision to expunge the record of Spennymoor United from the table and for the issue to be considered by a meeting that had a quorum.

=== Second board meeting ===
At the emergency board meeting held on 1 May 2005, the Board of the Northern Premier Football League confirmed their decision to expunge Spennymoor United's playing record. This meeting came a day after the final day of the Northern Premier League Premier Division season where Workington had finished in first place, Hyde United in second (having played 41 games to Workington and Farsley's 42) and Farsley in third. The confirmation to expunge Spennymoor United's playing record then saw Farsley finish in first place, Hyde United finish in second and Workington finish in third.

Gateshead, Hyde United, Radcliffe Borough and Workington followed up their appeal to the FA and on 4 May the FA overturned the Northern Premier League Board's decision to expunge the playing record of Spennymoor United. The FA ruled that the Northern Premier League was bound by an undertaking, duly minuted at its management committee meeting in January, that Spennymoor United would not be expelled, nor its record for the season expunged.

The FA decided that Spennymoor United’s playing record would re-instated into the league records and, in addition, three points would be awarded to other teams for each game outstanding against Spennymoor United, although no goals for or against will be allocated. Hyde United were one of the teams awarded three points which awarded them the 2004–05 Northern Premier League Premier Division Championship.

Farsley Celtic celebrated winning the Championship on the last day of the season, ignoring the fact that the original meeting on 24 April did not have a quorum however, as a result of the new overruling finished third in the table. Burscough, who had slipped from fifth to sixth, and out of the final promotion play-off place, thanks to Prescot Cables being awarded six points due to their two unplayed games against Spennymoor United, were aggrieved by this decision and, on 11 May, attempted to get the FA to go to arbitration. This was rejected outright by the FA, and so Farsley Celtic and Burscough attempted to get the FA Appeal Board decision on 4 May overturned by the High Court of Justice in London on 12 May.

=== Conclusive finding ===
On 13 May 2005 the FA and the Northern Premier League confirmed that Hyde United were the champions of the Northern Premier League Premier Division, and were presented with the trophy at their end of season party by Northern Premier League Chairman, Duncan Bayley.

Workington, who had finished first on the last day of the season having played a game more than Hyde United, were promoted along with Hyde United having beaten Farsley Celtic in a penalty shootout in the play-off final.
