= 1974–75 Northern Premier League =

Northern Premier League
- Season: 1974–75
- Champions: Wigan Athletic
- Promoted: None
- Relegated: None
- Matches: 552
- Goals: 1,595 (2.89 per match)
- Biggest home win: Runcorn 7–0 Fleetwood (14 December 1974)
- Biggest away win: Matlock Town 0–10 Lancaster City (14 December 1974)
- Highest scoring: Northwich Victoria 4–6 Mossley (16 September 1974) Barrow 3–7 Morecambe (16 October 1974) Matlock Town 0–10 Lancaster City (14 December 1974)
- Longest winning run: 11 matches Wigan Athletic (9 October 1974 – 21 December 1974)
- Longest unbeaten run: 22 matches Wigan Athletic (24 August 1974 – 21 December 1974); Altrincham (2 September 1974 – 20 January 1975)
- Longest winless run: 24 matches Fleetwood (19 October 1974 – 18 March 1975)
- Longest losing run: 8 matches Netherfield (2 November 1974 – 16 December 1974)

The 1974–75 Northern Premier League was the seventh season of the Northern Premier League, a regional football league in Northern England, the northern areas of the Midlands and North Wales. The season began on 17 August 1974 and concluded on 12 May 1975.

== Overview ==
South Shields changed their name to Gateshead United and moved from Simonside Hall to Gateshead Youth Stadium.

=== Team changes ===
The following club left the League at the end of the previous season:

- Bradford Park Avenue folded

The following club joined the League at the start of the season:

- Worksop Town promoted from Midland League (1889) (returning after a five year's absence)

=== League table ===
Pos	Team	Pld	W	D	L	GF	GA	GR	Pts
1	Wigan Athletic (C)	46	33	6	7	94	38	2.474	72
2	Runcorn	46	30	8	8	102	42	2.429	68
3	Altrincham	46	26	12	8	87	43	2.023	64
4	Stafford Rangers	46	25	13	8	81	39	2.077	63
5	Scarborough	46	24	12	10	75	45	1.667	60
6	Mossley	46	23	11	12	78	52	1.500	57
7	Gateshead United	46	22	12	12	74	48	1.542	56
8	Goole Town	46	19	12	15	75	71	1.056	50
9	Northwich Victoria	46	18	12	16	83	71	1.169	48
10	Great Harwood	46	17	14	15	69	66	1.045	48
11	Matlock Town	46	19	8	19	87	79	1.101	46
12	Boston United	46	16	14	16	64	63	1.016	46
13	Morecambe	46	14	15	17	71	87	0.816	43
14	Worksop Town	46	14	14	18	69	66	1.045	42
15	South Liverpool	46	14	14	18	59	71	0.831	42
16	Buxton	46	11	17	18	50	77	0.649	39
17	Macclesfield Town	46	11	14	21	46	62	0.742	36
18	Lancaster City	46	13	10	23	53	76	0.697	36
19	Bangor City	46	13	9	24	56	67	0.836	35
20	Gainsborough Trinity	46	10	15	21	46	79	0.582	35
21	Skelmersdale United	46	13	7	26	63	93	0.677	33
22	Barrow	46	9	15	22	45	72	0.625	33
23	Netherfield	46	12	8	26	42	91	0.462	32
24	Fleetwood	46	5	10	31	26	97	0.268	20

Updated to match(es) played on 12 May 1975. Source: The Football Archives
Rules for classification: 1) points; 2) goal average; 3) number of goals scored.

The system of using goal average to separate two teams tied on points was used up until the 1976–77 season.

The points system up until the 1982–83 season: 2 points for a win, 1 point for a draw and 0 points for losing.
(C) Champions

=== Results ===
Home \ Away	ALT	BAN	BRW	BOS	BUX	FLE	GAI	GAT	GOO	GHA	LNC	MAC	MAT	MOR	MOS	NET	NOR	RUN	SCA	SKU	SLI	STA	WIG	WOK
Altrincham		1–0	1–0	5–1	5–0	4–2	0–0	4–2	2–3	0–0	2–2	2–1	5–0	3–2	1–0	3–1	1–1	0–1	2–1	5–0	2–2	2–0	2–2	1–1
Bangor City	0–1		2–2	1–0	6–2	3–0	5–0	1–0	4–3	3–1	3–0	0–2	2–0	1–2	1–2	2–1	2–2	2–0	1–1	0–1	1–2	0–1	1–1	2–2
Barrow	2–0	1–0		1–1	0–1	3–0	1–2	1–1	1–1	2–1	1–0	0–0	3–1	0–0	0–3	0–2	1–1	2–3	0–1	0–1	2–2	1–3	2–4	1–0
Boston United	0–2	2–1	0–0		5–2	3–2	3–1	0–1	0–1	2–2	0–3	1–1	3–3	2–1	1–1	4–0	2–0	3–0	2–1	2–0	2–2	0–0	1–1	0–1
Buxton	1–2	1–1	0–1	0–1		1–0	0–0	0–1	1–1	1–1	1–0	2–2	2–1	0–0	0–1	1–2	2–5	0–0	0–3	0–1	2–1	0–5	0–2	3–0
Fleetwood Town	0–1	0–1	0–0	0–3	0–3		1–0	2–0	0–2	1–2	0–3	1–1	3–0	2–3	1–1	1–0	0–2	0–1	0–1	0–3	0–4	0–0	0–3	2–2
Gainsborough Trinity	1–1	2–0	0–0	0–2	1–1	0–0		1–1	0–2	1–2	1–0	2–1	1–4	1–1	3–1	0–1	2–2	2–2	1–3	2–1	0–0	1–4	3–1	0–0
Gateshead United	2–0	4–1	1–0	1–1	2–0	0–0	3–0		5–1	2–0	2–0	2–0	0–0	4–1	2–1	3–1	1–0	0–3	1–2	1–0	2–3	0–2	0–1	2–2
Goole Town	0–1	1–1	2–0	0–1	4–3	2–1	0–2	1–1		4–1	4–2	1–2	5–1	2–2	3–1	2–3	3–0	1–0	1–0	3–1	3–1	0–0	0–2	1–1
Great Harwood	0–3	0–0	1–1	4–1	4–4	4–0	2–1	2–1	2–1		1–1	3–1	2–0	3–3	1–0	3–1	1–0	2–2	1–1	3–1	0–0	2–2	2–3	2–1
Lancaster City	1–1	4–1	3–0	2–0	0–0	1–1	5–3	1–1	1–1	1–1		2–1	0–10	0–3	2–3	0–1	3–0	5–1	0–2	1–0	2–0	2–0	1–3	0–2
Macclesfield Town	0–3	1–0	2–2	2–0	0–0	4–0	1–1	2–2	1–1	0–1	2–0		1–0	1–2	2–1	2–0	0–1	0–1	1–2	3–0	2–2	0–0	0–1	0–0
Matlock Town	1–0	1–0	4–0	3–3	5–0	4–0	2–2	2–2	1–1	1–0	2–0	3–1		7–2	2–0	0–1	3–2	0–2	1–2	2–0	5–2	2–3	3–0	3–1
Morecambe	2–3	3–1	3–7	1–0	2–2	2–0	3–0	2–1	1–1	2–2	1–1	1–1	4–0		0–1	1–2	4–2	0–2	1–1	3–0	1–2	1–2	1–1	1–1
Mossley	2–2	1–0	5–3	2–1	2–3	0–1	4–0	3–0	2–0	2–0	1–0	2–1	1–1	5–0		2–1	3–1	0–0	1–1	1–0	4–1	3–1	1–0	2–0
Netherfield	1–2	0–0	0–0	1–2	1–1	1–1	3–0	0–5	0–0	0–2	0–0	1–0	2–1	4–1	0–0		1–2	0–3	0–2	1–6	1–0	0–1	0–4	2–2
Northwich Victoria	2–2	2–0	1–0	1–1	2–2	4–1	2–0	0–0	3–0	2–1	5–0	0–1	5–1	0–0	4–6	7–1		3–4	1–1	4–0	0–2	3–1	2–0	1–0
Runcorn	2–0	3–2	5–0	5–1	0–0	7–0	4–1	1–2	4–0	3–1	1–0	3–0	6–0	4–1	4–1	3–0	5–1		1–1	5–2	2–0	2–0	0–1	2–1
Scarborough	1–1	1–0	1–0	1–0	0–1	4–0	2–0	1–3	4–3	4–3	3–0	1–0	1–3	1–1	0–0	3–1	3–1	1–1		2–2	4–0	1–0	0–1	2–0
Skelmersdale United	0–5	4–1	3–2	2–1	1–2	4–1	1–2	1–5	2–3	2–3	4–1	2–2	2–1	2–1	1–1	4–2	1–3	0–0	1–1		1–4	0–0	0–1	1–4
South Liverpool	1–3	1–2	1–0	1–1	0–0	1–1	1–2	0–2	1–2	2–0	4–1	1–0	0–1	1–2	3–2	2–1	1–1	0–1	0–4	1–1		1–1	1–1	3–1
Stafford Rangers	1–0	4–0	1–1	2–2	2–2	5–0	2–1	0–2	5–2	1–0	0–1	2–0	4–0	5–0	2–1	4–0	1–1	2–0	2–1	3–2	0–0		2–0	2–0
Wigan Athletic	0–1	3–1	6–1	2–1	3–1	1–0	2–1	3–0	3–1	1–0	1–0	4–1	2–1	5–1	0–0	5–1	2–0	2–0	3–1	2–1	4–0	0–1		4–0
Worksop Town	1–0	1–0	2–0	0–2	1–2	3–1	2–2	1–1	1–2	1–0	2–1	6–0	1–1	1–2	2–2	4–0	5–1	2–3	3–1	3–1	1–2	2–2	2–3	

Updated to match(es) played on 12 May 1975. Source: The Football Archives
Legend: Blue = home team win; Yellow = draw; Red = away team win.

=== Stadia and locations ===
Locations of the 1974–75 Northern Premier League teams

Team	Stadium
Altrincham	Moss Lane
Bangor City	Farrar Road
Barrow	Holker Street
Boston United	York Street
Buxton	The Silverlands
Fleetwood	Highbury
Gainsborough Trinity	The Northolme
Gateshead United	Gateshead Youth Stadium
Goole Town	Victoria Pleasure Ground
Great Harwood	The Showground
Lancaster City	Great Axe
Macclesfield Town	Moss Rose
Matlock Town	Causeway Lane
Morecambe	Christie Park
Mossley	Seel Park
Netherfield	Parkside
Northwich Victoria	Drill Field
Runcorn	Canal Street
Scarborough	Athletic Ground
Skelmersdale United	White Moss Park
South Liverpool	Holly Park
Stafford Rangers	Marston Road
Wigan Athletic	Springfield Park
Worksop Town	Central Avenue

== Cup results ==
=== Challenge Cup ===
Stage	Home team	Score	Away team
1st Leg	Runcorn	?–?	Stafford Rangers
2nd Leg	Stafford Rangers	?–?	Runcorn
Aggregate	Runcorn	2–1	Stafford Rangers

=== Northern Premier League Shield ===
Between Champions of NPL Premier Division and Winners of the NPL Cup.

Home team	Score	Away team
Wigan Athletic	beat	Runcorn

=== FA Cup ===
Out of the twenty-four clubs from the Northern Premier League, only four teams reached for the second round:

Second Round

Home team	Score	Away team	
Altrincham	3–0	Gateshead United	
Stafford Rangers	2–1	Halifax Town	
Wigan Athletic	1–1	Mansfield Town	
Mansfield Town	3–1	Wigan Athletic	Replay

Third Round

Home team	Score	Away team	
Everton	1–1	Altrincham	
Altrincham	0–2	Everton	Replay
Stafford Rangers	0–0	Rotherham United	
Rotherham United	0–2	Stafford Rangers	Replay

Fourth Round

Home team	Score	Away team
Stafford Rangers	1–2	Peterborough United

=== FA Trophy ===
Out of the twenty-four clubs from the Northern Premier League, four teams reached for the fourth round:

Fourth Round

Home team	Score	Away team
Goole Town	0–1	Matlock Town
Scarborough	1–0	Wimbledon
Wigan Athletic	0–1	Bedford Town

Semi-finals

Stage	Home team	Score	Away team
1st Leg	Matlock Town	0–1	Burton Albion
2nd Leg	Burton Albion	0–2	Matlock Town
Aggregate	Matlock Town	2–1	Burton Albion
1st Leg	Scarborough	3–1	Bedford Town
2nd Leg	Bedford Town	1–3	Scarborough
Aggregate	Scarborough	6–2	Bedford Town

Final

Home team	Score	Away team
Matlock Town	4–0	Scarborough

== End of the season ==
At the end of the seventh season of the Northern Premier League none of the teams put forward for election received enough votes to be promoted to the Football League.

=== Football League elections ===
Alongside the four Football League teams facing re-election, a total of twelve non-League teams applied for election, four of which were from the Northern Premier League. All four Football League teams were re-elected.

Club	League	Votes
Swansea City	Football League	43
Scunthorpe United	Football League	41
Darlington	Football League	32
Workington	Football League	28
Kettering Town	Southern League	20
Yeovil Town	Southern League	8
Wimbledon	Southern League	4
Bedford Town	Southern League	2
Goole Town	Northern Premier League	2
Scarborough	Northern Premier League	2
Gainsborough Trinity	Northern Premier League	1
Nuneaton Borough	Southern League	1
Telford United	Southern League	1
Weymouth	Southern League	1
Boston United	Northern Premier League	0
Chelmsford City	Southern League	0

=== Promotion and relegation ===
No clubs were promoted, conversely, none of the clubs were relegated.
