= Alvechurch F.C. =

Association football club in England

Coordinates: 52°20′41″N 1°57′23″W

Alvechurch
- Full name: Alvechurch Football Club
- Nickname: The Church
- Founded: 1929
- Ground: Lye Meadow
- Capacity: 3,000 (250 seated)
- Chairman: Richard Thorndike
- Manager: Kyle Storer
- League: Southern League Premier Division Central
- 2025–26: Southern League Premier Division Central, 14th of 22
Home colours	Away colours

Alvechurch Football Club is a football club based in Alvechurch, Worcestershire, England. They are currently members of the Southern League Premier Division Central and play at Lye Meadow.

== History ==
The club was established in 1929 as Alvechurch Juniors and played in the Redditch League until World War II. They were runners-up in the West Midlands Alliance in 1960–61 and moved up to Division One of the Worcestershire Combination. After a seventh-place finish in their first season in the Combination, the next seven seasons saw the club finish either first or second in the league, winning the league title in 1962–63, 1964–65 and 1966–67 and the League Cup in 1964–65, 1965–66 and 1967–68. In 1965–66 they reached the semi-finals of the FA Amateur Cup, eventually losing 1–0 to Wealdstone at Stamford Bridge with around 10,000 supporters travelling to London for the game.

The league was renamed the Midland Combination in 1968 and Alvechurch were League Cup winners again in 1968–69. In 1971–72 they won their fourth Midland Combination title and the League Cup for the fifth time. The season also saw them make FA Cup history; in the fourth qualifying round they were drawn against Oxford City. Following a 2–2 draw at home, the tie went to a record five replays; the first replay at Oxford City's ground was drawn 1–1. The second replay was at St Andrew's in Birmingham, as any replays after the first were required to be on a neutral ground, and also ended 1–1. The third and fourth replays (both at the Manor Ground in Oxford) ended 0–0, before Alvechurch finally won the fifth replay 1–0 at Villa Park. Four of the games also went to extra time. The six matches, which were played over 17 days during which Alvechurch also had a league match, remains a record for an FA Cup tie, as in 1991 the FA scrapped any matches beyond the first replay, which would now end with penalties to decide a winner. The win meant that Alvechurch reached the first round proper for the first time, also becoming the first club from the Midland Combination to do so. They went on to lose 4–2 at Aldershot.

After finishing as runners-up in the Midland Combination in 1972–73 and winning the Worcestershire Senior Cup, Alvechurch switched to the Premier Division of the West Midlands (Regional) League. The club's first season in the league saw them reach the first round of the FA Cup again, in which they defeated Fourth Division Exeter City 1–0. This was followed by a 6–1 win at home to King's Lynn in the second round, before a 4–2 defeat at Bradford City in the third. They also won the West Midlands (Regional) League title, the League Cup, the Birmingham Senior Amateur Cup and the Worcestershire Senior Cup. The club retained the league title for the next three seasons, also winning the League Cup again in 1974–75 and the Worcestershire Senior Cup in 1976–77. They were Premier Division runners-up and League Cup winners in 1977–78, after which the club moved up to Division One North of the Southern League.

Following league reorganisation, Alvechurch were placed in the Southern League's Midland Division for the 1979–80 season, and were divisional champions in 1980–81, going on to beat Dartford of the Southern Division in the championship play-off, winning 1–0 at home and losing 3–2 away, before winning the tie 4–3 on penalties. The club were Midland Division runners-up and League Cup winners the following season. League reorganisation then saw them placed in the new Premier Division for the 1982–83 season. The club's success subsequently dried up as the next three seasons saw them finish in the bottom half of the table. They finished second-from-bottom of the Premier Division in 1989–90 season, resulting in relegation to the Midland Division. Another relegation two seasons later saw them drop back into the Premier Division of the West Midlands (Regional) League. The club subsequently folded in 1993.

The club was re-established under the name Alvechurch Villa in 1994, entering the Premier Division of the Midland Combination. In 1996 they returned to the name Alvechurch. In 2002–03 the club were Premier Division champions and League Cup winners, and were promoted to the Midland Alliance. They subsequently won the Worcestershire Senior Urn in 2003–04, 2004–05, 2007–08, 2009–10 and 2012–13. When the Midland Combination merged with the Midland Combination to form the Midland League in 2014, Alvechurch were placed in the Premier Division. They were runners-up in the league and Worcestershire Senior Urn winners in 2015–16, and went on to win the league and League Cup double the following season, earning promotion to Division One South of the Northern Premier League.

Alvechurch's first season in the Northern Premier League saw them finish as runners-up in Division One South, resulting in promotion to the Premier Division Central of the Southern League. A fourth-place finish in 2018–19 led to the club qualifying for the promotion play-offs. However, after beating Stourbridge 2–1 in the semi-finals, they lost 3–0 to King's Lynn Town in the final. At the end of the season the club won the Worcestershire Senior Cup for the fourth time. In 2022–23 the club reached the FA Cup first round again, winning 2–1 at League One club Cheltenham Town to progress to the second round, where they lost 2–1 to Forest Green Rovers.

=== Season-by-season record ===
Season	Division	Position	Significant events
1961–62	Worcestershire Combination Division One	7	
1962–63	Worcestershire Combination Division One	1	Champions
1963–64	Worcestershire Combination Division One	2	
1964–65	Worcestershire Combination Division One	1	Champions
1965–66	Worcestershire Combination Division One	2	
1966–67	Worcestershire Combination Division One	1	Champions
1967–68	Worcestershire Combination Division One	2	
1968–69	Midland Combination Division One	2	
1969–70	Midland Combination Division One	3	
1970–71	Midland Combination Division One	5	
1971–72	Midland Combination Division One	1	Champions
1972–73	Midland Combination Division One	2	
1973–74	West Midlands (Regional) League Premier Division	1	Champions
1974–75	West Midlands (Regional) League Premier Division	1	Champions
1975–76	West Midlands (Regional) League Premier Division	1	Champions
1976–77	West Midlands (Regional) League Premier Division	1	Champions
1977–78	West Midlands (Regional) League Premier Division	2	
1978–79	Southern League Division One North	3	
1979–80	Southern League Midland Division	8	
1980–81	Southern League Midland Division	1	Champions
1981–82	Southern League Midland Division	2	
1982–83	Southern League Premier Division	13	
1983–84	Southern League Premier Division	16	
1984–85	Southern League Premier Division	15	
1985–86	Southern League Premier Division	4	
1986–87	Southern League Premier Division	8	
1987–88	Southern League Premier Division	7	
1988–89	Southern League Premier Division	14	
1989–90	Southern League Premier Division	21	Relegated
1990–91	Southern League Midland Division	20	
1991–92	Southern League Midland Division	21	Relegated
1992–93	West Midlands (Regional) League Premier Division	9	Folded
1994–95	Midland Combination Premier Division	5	
1995–96	Midland Combination Premier Division	16	
1996–97	Midland Combination Premier Division	18	
1997–98	Midland Combination Premier Division	17	
1998–99	Midland Combination Premier Division	14	
1999–2000	Midland Combination Premier Division	10	
2000–01	Midland Combination Premier Division	7	
2001–02	Midland Combination Premier Division	20	
2002–03	Midland Combination Premier Division	1	Champions, promoted
2003–04	Midland Alliance	19	
2004–05	Midland Alliance	19	
2005–06	Midland Alliance	14	
2006–07	Midland Alliance	10	
2007–08	Midland Alliance	14	
2008–09	Midland Alliance	10	
2009–10	Midland Alliance	7	
2010–11	Midland Alliance	20	
2011–12	Midland Alliance	13	
2012–13	Midland Alliance	11	
2013–14	Midland Alliance	13	
2014–15	Midland League	15	
2015–16	Midland League	2	
2016–17	Midland League	1	Champions, promoted
2017–18	Northern Premier League Division One South	2	Promoted
2018–19	Southern League Premier Central	4	
2019–20	Southern League Premier Central	21	Season expunged due to COVID-19 pandemic
2020–21	Southern League Premier Central	17	Season expunged due to COVID-19 pandemic
2021–22	Southern League Premier Central	5	

== Ground ==
The club originally played at the Meadows, a site donated to the village by Colonel Wiggins. However, the ground was unenclosed and the club could not charge for admission. Following World War II, they relocated to the Gaunts, a field on Snake Lane. However, this was soon needed for housing. The club then purchased a field on Redditch Road for £1,000, building a new ground that became opened in 1957 and was named Lye Meadow. A record attendance of 13,500 was set for an FA Amateur Cup quarter-final tie against Enfield in 1964–65, although it is estimated that there were up to 16,000 in the ground.

== Honours ==
- Southern League
  - Champions 1980–81
  - Midland Division champions 1980–81
  - League Cup winners 1982–83
- Midland League
  - Premier Division champions 2016–17
  - League Cup winners 2016–17
- West Midlands (Regional) League
  - Premier Division champions 1973–74, 1974–75, 1975–76, 1976–77
  - League Cup winners 1973–74, 1974–75, 1977–78
- Midland Combination
  - Champions 1962–63, 1964–65, 1966–67, 1971–72, 2002–03
  - League Cup winners 1964–65, 1965–66, 1967–68, 1968–69, 1971–72, 2002–03
  - Invitation Cup winners 1966–67, 1967–68
- Worcestershire Senior Cup
  - Winners 1972–73, 1973–74, 1976–77, 2018–19
- Worcestershire Senior Urn
  - Winners 2003–04, 2004–05, 2007–08, 2009–10, 2012–13, 2015–16
- Birmingham Senior Amateur Cup
  - Winners 1973–74
- JW Hunt Cup
  - Winners 2016–17

== Records ==
- Best FA Cup performance: Third round, 1973–74
- Best FA Amateur Cup performance: Semi-finals, 1965–66
- Best FA Trophy performance: Fourth round, 2025–26
- Best FA Vase performance: Fourth round, 2015–16
- Biggest win: 13–0 vs Alcester Town
- Heaviest defeat: 9–0 vs Coalville Town
- Most appearances: Kevin Palmer
- Most goals: Graham Allner
  - Most goals in a season: Keith Rostill, 53 (2002–03)
- Record transfer fee received: £34,000 from Aston Villa for Andy Comyn, 1989
- Record transfer fee paid: £3,000 to Worcester City for Peter Gocan, 1989
- Record attendance: 13,500 vs Enfield, FA Amateur Cup quarter-final, 1964–65

== See also ==
- Alvechurch F.C. players
- Alvechurch F.C. managers
