= 1972–73 Midland Football Combination =

The 1972–73 Midland Football Combination season was the 36th in the history of Midland Football Combination, a football competition in England.

== Division One ==
Midland Football Combination Division One
- Season: 1972–73
- Champions: Highgate United
- Matches: 306
- Goals: 918 (3 per match)

Division One featured 17 clubs which competed in the division last season along with one new club:

- Racing Club Warwick, promoted from the West Midlands League Division One

=== League table ===
Pos	Team	Pld	W	D	L	GF	GA	GR	Pts	Promotion or relegation
1	Highgate United	34	28	5	1	85	21	4.048	61	
2	Alvechurch	34	27	4	3	104	23	4.522	58	Transferred to the West Midlands (Regional) League
3	Sutton Coldfield Town	34	23	5	6	75	31	2.419	51	
4	Evesham United	34	20	8	6	70	35	2.000	48	
5	Malvern Town	34	17	8	9	64	53	1.208	42	
6	Oldbury United	34	16	8	10	50	39	1.282	40	
7	Racing Club Warwick	34	14	8	12	50	45	1.111	36	
8	Paget Rangers	34	14	7	13	45	52	0.865	35	
9	Moor Green	34	12	10	12	45	43	1.047	34	
10	West Midlands Police	34	10	10	14	46	61	0.754	30	
11	Bridgnorth Town	34	10	8	16	44	66	0.667	28	
12	Stratford Town	34	9	9	16	35	38	0.921	27	
13	Walsall Wood	34	9	6	19	36	71	0.507	24	
14	Solihull Borough	34	7	9	18	42	57	0.737	23	
15	Northfield Town	34	6	10	18	33	60	0.550	22	
16	Boldmere St. Michaels	34	6	8	20	41	71	0.577	20	
17	Knowle	34	8	4	22	36	70	0.514	20	
18	Blakenall	34	4	5	25	17	82	0.207	13	

Source: nonleaguematters
Rules for classification: 1) points; 2) goal difference; 3) number of goals scored.
