= Coventry Sporting F.C. =

English association football club

Coventry Sporting
- Full name: Coventry Sporting Football Club
- Founded: 1936
- Dissolved: 1989
- Ground: Butts Stadium, Coventry
Home colours

Coventry Sporting Football, previously known as Coventry Amateurs Football Club, was an English association football club which participated in the Southern Football League and the FA Cup.

== History ==
The club was formed in 1936 as the works team of the Coventry Tile Company, playing their home games at Butts Stadium, the former home of Coventry R.F.C. In 1946 the club's name changed to Coventry Amateurs, and two years later they moved to a new ground at Kirby's Corner. 1974 saw another rename, to Coventry Sporting, as the club turned semi-professional. By this point they were competing in the West Midlands Regional League. Sporting reached the First Round proper of the FA Cup for the first time in 1975–76, where they were drawn at home to Tranmere Rovers, then top of Division Four. The game was moved to Coventry City's Highfield Road, where Sporting won 2–0. They were again drawn at home in the Second Round, but lost 4–0 to Peterborough United, again at Highfield Road. In 1983 Sporting were promoted to the Southern League, but six years later were wound up.

== Records ==
- Best FA Cup performance: Second round, 1975–76
