= Warley County Borough F.C. =

English football club

Warley County Borough F.C. was an English association football club based in Warley in the Black Country.

== History ==
The club competed in the West Midlands (Regional) League between 1968 and 1977 and won the Division One championship in the 1969–70 and 1971–72 seasons, before going on to spend five seasons in the Premier Division. The club also competed in the FA Cup on three occasions, the FA Trophy twice and the FA Vase once.

== Colours ==
The club wore white shirts and red shorts.
